= 2025 North Texas Mean Green football team =

American college football season

2025 North Texas Mean Green football
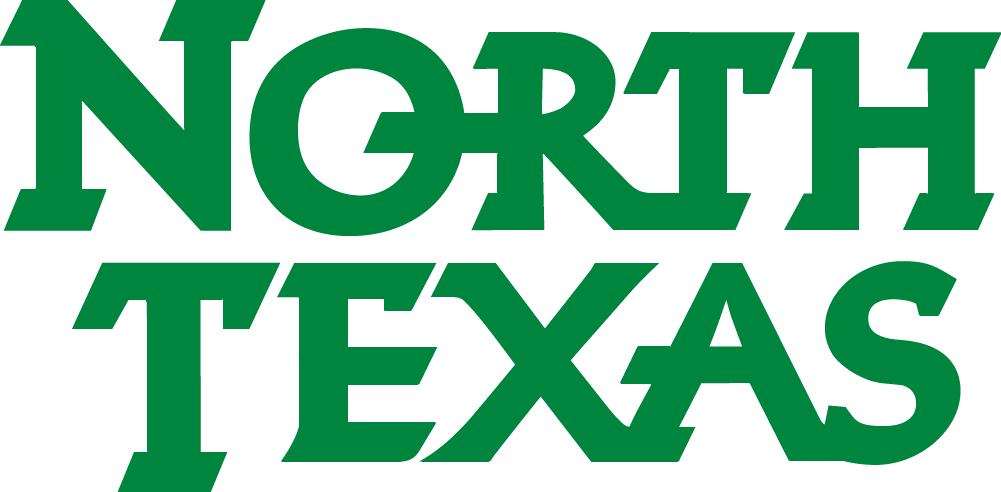

New Mexico Bowl champion

American Conference Championship Game, L 21–34 vs. Tulane

New Mexico Bowl, W 49–47 vs. San Diego State
- Conference: American Conference

Ranking
- AP: No. 24
- Record: 12–2 (7–1 American)
- Head coach: Eric Morris (3rd season; regular season); Drew Svoboda (interim; bowl game)
- Offensive coordinator: Jordan Davis (3rd season)
- Offensive scheme: Air raid
- Defensive coordinator: Skyler Cassity (1st season)
- Base defense: 3–4
- Home stadium: DATCU Stadium

2025 American Conference football standings
	Conf.			Overall
Team	W		L	W		L
No. 18 Tulane y$^	7	–	1	11	–	3
No. 24 North Texas y	7	–	1	12	–	2
No. 23 Navy	7	–	1	11	–	2
South Florida	6	–	2	9	–	4
East Carolina	6	–	2	9	–	4
Memphis	4	–	4	8	–	5
Army	4	–	4	7	–	6
UTSA	4	–	4	7	–	6
Temple	3	–	5	5	–	7
Florida Atlantic	3	–	5	4	–	8
Rice	2	–	6	5	–	8
UAB	2	–	6	4	–	8
Tulsa	1	–	7	4	–	8
Charlotte	0	–	8	1	–	11
Championship: Tulane 34, North Texas 21
^ – College Football Playoff participant; $ – Conference champion; y – Championship game participant; Rankings from AP Poll

The 2025 North Texas Mean Green football team represented the University of North Texas as member of the American Conference during the 2025 NCAA Division I FBS football season. Led by third-year head coach Eric Morris, the Mean Green played their home games at the DATCU Stadium, located in Denton, Texas. On November 16, the Mean Green were ranked in the AP Poll for the first time since 1959, ending the longest drought for an FBS team. Additionally, on December 2, North Texas was ranked by the College Football Playoff selection committee for the first time. They played the New Mexico Bowl as a ranked team for the first time in school history and defeated San Diego State.

On November 25, Morris was hired as the new head coach at Oklahoma State; Morris remained with the Mean Green through the American Championship Game. On December 2, the university announced that Neal Brown had been hired as the program's new head coach. On December 9, associate head coach Drew Svoboda was named interim head coach for the New Mexico Bowl.

== Schedule ==
The American Athletic Conference announced the 2025 football conference opponents for the Mean Green on August 15, 2024.

Date	Time	Opponent	Rank	Site	TV	Result	Attendance
August 30	7:00 p.m.	Lamar*		DATCU Stadium; Denton, TX	ESPN+	W 51–0	20,594
September 6	2:30 p.m.	at Western Michigan*		Waldo Stadium; Kalamazoo, MI	ESPN+	W 33–30 ^{OT}	20,051
September 13	2:30 p.m.	Washington State*		DATCU Stadium; Denton, TX	ESPNU	W 59–10	26,837
September 20	11:00 a.m.	at Army		Michie Stadium; West Point, NY	CBSSN	W 45–38 ^{OT}	28,446
September 27	11:00 a.m.	South Alabama*		DATCU Stadium; Denton, TX	ESPNU	W 36–22	16,575
October 10	6:30 p.m.	No. 24 South Florida		DATCU Stadium; Denton, TX	ESPN2	L 36–63	31,386‡
October 18	2:30 p.m.	UTSA^{†}		DATCU Stadium; Denton, TX	ESPN+	W 55–17	25,053
October 24	6:00 p.m.	at Charlotte		Jerry Richardson Stadium; Charlotte, NC	ESPN2	W 54–20	9,626
November 1	11:00 a.m.	Navy		DATCU Stadium; Denton, TX	ESPN2	W 31–17	26,516
November 15	1:00 p.m.	at UAB		Protective Stadium; Birmingham, AL	ESPN+	W 53–24	16,190
November 22	6:30 p.m.	at Rice		Rice Stadium; Houston, TX	ESPNU	W 56–24	24,598
November 28	2:30 p.m.	Temple		DATCU Stadium; Denton, TX	ESPN	W 52–25	24,492
December 5	7:00 p.m.	at No. 20 Tulane	No. 24	Yulman Stadium; New Orleans, LA (American Championship Game)	ABC	L 21–34	23,986
December 27	4:45 p.m.	vs. San Diego State*	No. 25	University Stadium; Albuquerque (New Mexico Bowl)	ESPN	W 49–47	18,867
*Non-conference game; ^{†}Homecoming; Rankings from AP (and CFP Rankings, after November 4) - Released prior to game; All times are in Central time

‡New DATCU Stadium attendance record.

== Rankings ==
Ranking movements Legend: ██ Increase in ranking ██ Decrease in ranking — = Not ranked RV = Received votes
	Week																
Poll	Pre	1	2	3	4	5	6	7	8	9	10	11	12	13	14	15	Final
AP	—	—	—	—	RV	RV	RV	—	—	RV	RV	RV	22	21	20	23	24
Coaches	—	—	—	—	RV	RV	RV	—	RV	RV	RV	RV	23	22	20	RV	RV
CFP	Not released										—	—	—	—	24	25	Not released

== Game summaries ==
=== Lamar (FCS) ===
Lamar Cardinals (FCS) (0–0) at North Texas Mean Green (0–0) – Game summary

Quarter	1	2	3	4	Total
Cardinals (FCS)	0	0	0	0	0
Mean Green	13	24	14	0	51

at DATCU Stadium • Denton, Texas

- Date: August 30
- Game time: 7:00 p.m. CDT
- Game weather: Cloudy • Temperature: 80 °F (27 °C) • Wind: NE at 8 miles per hour (13 km/h)
- Game attendance: 20,594
- Referee: Kevin Randall
- TV announcers (ESPN+): Justin Kutcher (play-by-play) and LaDarrin McLane (analyst)

Game information

First quarter

- (11:21) UNT – Drew Mestemaker 2-yard run, pass failed (Drive: 8 plays, 75 yards, 3:39; North Texas 6–0)
- (5:46) UNT – Makenzie McGill II 1-yard run, Kali Nguma kick (Drive: 9 plays, 65 yards, 2:43; North Texas 13–0)

Second quarter

- (6:35) UNT – Wyatt Young 5-yard pass from Drew Mestemaker, Kali Nguma kick (Drive: 7 plays, 54 yards, 3:03; North Texas 20–0)
- (1:53) UNT – Cameron Dorner 25-yard pass from Drew Mestemaker, Kali Nguma kick (Drive: 6 plays, 76 yards, 1:46; North Texas 27–0)
- (0:57) UNT – Kali Nguma 28-yard field goal (Drive: 4 plays, 7 yards, 0:49; North Texas 30–0)
- (0:27) UNT – Ethan Wesloski 0-yard fumble recovery, Kali Nguma kick (North Texas 37–0)

Third quarter

- (11:16) UNT – Kiefer Sibley 1-yard run, Kali Nguma kick (Drive: 5 plays, 52 yards, 2:04; North Texas 44–0)
- (8:41) UNT – Wyatt Young 32-yard pass from Drew Mestemaker, Kali Nguma kick (Drive: 4 plays, 62 yards, 1:36; North Texas 51–0)

Fourth quarter

- No scoring plays.

Statistics	LAM	UNT
First downs	8	25
Plays–yards	54–119	73–467
Rushes–yards	27–31	39–138
Passing yards	88	329
Passing: comp–att–int	13–27–1	24–34–0
Turnovers	2	1
Time of possession	26:32	33:28

Team	Category	Player	Statistics
Lamar	Passing	Robert Coleman	13/24, 88 yards, INT
Lamar	Rushing	Major Bowden	6 carries, 21 yards
Lamar	Receiving	Kyndon Fuselier	4 receptions, 45 yards
North Texas	Passing	Drew Mestemaker	24/32, 329 yards, 3 TD
North Texas	Rushing	Kiefer Sibley	6 carries, 38 yards, TD
North Texas	Receiving	Cameron Dorner	7 receptions, 98 yards, TD

=== at Western Michigan ===
North Texas Mean Green (1–0) at Western Michigan Broncos (0–1) – Game summary

Quarter	1	2	3	4	OT	Total
Mean Green	0	7	10	10	6	33
Broncos	0	17	7	3	3	30

at Waldo Stadium • Kalamazoo, Michigan

- Date: September 6
- Game time: 2:30 p.m. CDT / 3:30 p.m. EDT
- Game weather: Sunny • Temperature: 63 °F (17 °C) • Wind: E at 15 miles per hour (24 km/h)
- Game attendance: 20,051
- Referee: Rick Warne
- TV announcers (ESPN+): Evan Stockton (play-by-play) and Marcus Ray (analyst)

Game information

First quarter

- No scoring plays.

Second quarter

- (13:33) WMU – Broc Lowry 25-yard run, Palmer Domschke kick (Drive: 9 plays, 61 yards, 4:34; Western Michigan 7–0)
- (10:48) UNT – Kiefer Sibley 10-yard run, Kali Nguma kick (Drive: 8 plays, 68 yards, 2:45; Tied 7–7)
- (8:08) WMU – Jalen Buckley 17-yard pass from Broc Lowry, Palmer Domschke kick (Drive: 5 plays, 64 yards, 2:40; Western Michigan 14–7)
- (0:00) WMU – Palmer Domschke 40-yard field goal (Drive: 10 plays, 30 yards, 2:54; Western Michigan 17–7)

Third quarter

- (10:37) UNT – Kali Nguma 22-yard field goal (Drive: 13 plays, 68 yards, 4:18; Western Michigan 17–10)
- (6:33) WMU – Broc Lowry 8-yard run, Palmer Domschke kick (Drive: 7 plays, 41 yards, 3:54; Western Michigan 24–10)
- (4:40) UNT – Tre Williams III 18-yard pass from Drew Mestemaker, Kali Nguma kick (Drive: 4 plays, 67 yards, 1:48; Western Michigan 24–17)

Fourth quarter

- (14:13) WMU – Palmer Domschke 43-yard field goal (Drive: 9 plays, 36 yards, 5:19; Western Michigan 27–17)
- (10:03) UNT – Cameron Dorner 4-yard pass from Drew Mestemaker, Kali Nguma kick (Drive: 9 plays, 65 yards, 4:10; Western Michigan 27–24)
- (1:34) UNT – Kali Nguma 25-yard field goal (Drive: 9 plays, 68 yards, 1:49; Tied 27–27)

Overtime

- WMU – Palmer Domschke 48-yard field goal (Drive: 4 plays, -5 yards; Western Michigan 30–27)
- UNT – Makenzie McGill II 3-yard run (Drive: 3 plays, 25 yards; North Texas 33–30)

Statistics	UNT	WMU
First downs	25	18
Plays–yards	63–406	71–303
Rushes–yards	30–182	57–216
Passing yards	224	87
Passing: comp–att–int	18–33–0	7–14–0
Turnovers	0	0
Time of possession	23:22	36:38

Team	Category	Player	Statistics
North Texas	Passing	Drew Mestemaker	18/33, 224 yards, 2 TD
North Texas	Rushing	Makenzie McGill II	16 carries, 102 yards, TD
North Texas	Receiving	Wyatt Young	4 receptions, 59 yards
Western Michigan	Passing	Broc Lowry	5/10, 75 yards, TD
Western Michigan	Rushing	Jalen Buckley	30 carries, 112 yards
Western Michigan	Receiving	Jalen Buckley	2 receptions, 51 yards, TD

=== Washington State ===
Washington State Cougars (2–0) at North Texas Mean Green (2–0) – Game summary

Quarter	1	2	3	4	Total
Cougars	3	0	0	7	10
Mean Green	14	28	10	7	59

at DATCU Stadium • Denton, Texas

- Date: September 13
- Game time: 2:30 p.m. CDT
- Game weather: Sunny • Temperature: 88 °F (31 °C) • Wind: N at 10 miles per hour (16 km/h)
- Game attendance: 26,837
- Referee: Edwin Lee
- TV announcers (ESPNU): Chuckie Kempf (play-by-play) and Darius Walker (analyst)

Game information

First quarter

- (10:33) UNT – Makenzie McGill II 7-yard run, Kali Nguma kick (Drive: 10 plays, 75 yards, 4:27; North Texas 7–0)
- (7:33) UNT – Jayden Becks 12-yard run, Kali Nguma kick (Drive: 1 play, 12 yards, 0:08; North Texas 14–0)
- (1:27) WSU – Jack Stevens 26-yard field goal (Drive: 14 plays, 82 yards, 6:01; North Texas 14–3)

Second quarter

- (7:07) UNT – Brandon Young Jr. 2-yard pass from Drew Mestemaker, Kali Nguma kick (Drive: 3 plays, 19 yards, 1:18; North Texas 21–3)
- (3:24) UNT – Tre Williams III 6-yard pass from Drew Mestemaker, Kali Nguma kick (Drive: 6 plays, 30 yards, 1:39; North Texas 28–3)
- (1:39) UNT – Landon Sides 12-yard pass from Drew Mestemaker, Kali Nguma kick (Drive: 1 play, 12 yards, 0:15; North Texas 35–3)
- (0:54) UNT – Jayden Becks 14-yard run, Kali Nguma kick (Drive: 2 plays, 20 yards, 0:36; North Texas 42–3)

Third quarter

- (9:46) UNT – Kali Nguma 26-yard field goal (Drive: 9 plays, 67 yards, 3:48; North Texas 45–3)
- (2:30) UNT – Ethan Day 2-yard pass from Drew Mestemaker, Kali Nguma kick (Drive: 10 plays, 68 yards, 4:53; North Texas 52–3)

Fourth quarter

- (8:54) UNT – Caleb Hawkins 3-yard run, Kali Nguma kick (Drive: 11 plays, 80 yards, 5:57; North Texas 59–3)
- (1:57) WSU – Zevi Eckhaus 2-yard run, Jack Stevens kick (Drive: 13 plays, 75 yards, 6:57; North Texas 59–10)

Statistics	WSU	UNT
First downs	17	25
Plays–yards	63–275	63–410
Rushes–yards	28–64	29–163
Passing yards	211	247
Passing: comp–att–int	23–35–3	29–34–0
Turnovers	5	0
Time of possession	31:26	28:34

Team	Category	Player	Statistics
Washington State	Passing	Jaxon Potter	16/23, 139 yards, 3 INT
Washington State	Rushing	Kirby Vorhees	6 carries, 33 yards
Washington State	Receiving	Carter Pabst	3 receptions, 65 yards
North Texas	Passing	Drew Mestemaker	24/29, 211 yards, 4 TD
North Texas	Rushing	Makenzie McGill II	9 carries, 67 yards, TD
North Texas	Receiving	Miles Coleman	4 receptions, 44 yards

=== at Army ===
North Texas Mean Green (3–0) at Army Black Knights (1–1) – Game summary

Quarter	1	2	3	4	OT	Total
Mean Green	21	7	3	7	7	45
Black Knights	7	7	7	17	0	38

at Michie Stadium • West Point, New York

- Date: September 20
- Game time: 11:00 a.m. CDT / 12:00 p.m. EDT
- Game weather: Sunny • Temperature: 68 °F (20 °C) • Wind: NE at 5 miles per hour (8.0 km/h)
- Game attendance: 28,446
- Referee: Charles Lamertina
- TV announcers (CBSSN): Dave Ryan (play-by-play), Adam Breneman (analyst), and Tina Cervasio (sideline)

Game information

First quarter

- (8:22) UNT – Caleb Hawkins 4-yard run, Kali Nguma kick (Drive: 15 plays, 75 yards, 6:38; North Texas 7–0)
- (3:21) UNT – Makenzie McGill II 6-yard run, Kali Nguma kick (Drive: 5 plays, 44 yards, 1:45; North Texas 14–0)
- (1:24) UNT – Caleb Hawkins 7-yard run, Kali Nguma kick (Drive: 3 plays, 18 yards, 0:39; North Texas 21–0)
- (1:14) ARMY – Briggs Bartosh 75-yard run, Dawson Jones kick (Drive: 1 play, 75 yards, 0:10; North Texas 21–7)

Second quarter

- (6:35) UNT – Wyatt Young 6-yard pass from Drew Mestemaker, Kali Nguma kick (Drive: 2 plays, 10 yards, 1:00; North Texas 28–7)
- (0:37) ARMY – Samari Howard 17-yard pass from Dewayne Coleman, Dawson Jones kick (Drive: 13 plays, 75 yards, 5:58; North Texas 28–14)

Third quarter

- (11:07) ARMY – Hayden Reed 37-yard run, Dawson Jones kick (Drive: 7 plays, 75 yards, 3:53; North Texas 28–21)
- (6:25) UNT – Kali Nguma 23-yard field goal (Drive: 12 plays, 67 yards, 4:35; North Texas 31–21)

Fourth quarter

- (11:27) ARMY – Dewayne Coleman 5-yard run, Dawson Jones kick (Drive: 17 plays, 75 yards, 9:58; North Texas 31–28)
- (9:03) UNT – Caleb Hawkins 21-yard run, Kali Nguma kick (Drive: 6 plays, 60 yards, 2:22; North Texas 38–28)
- (2:56) ARMY – Brady Anderson 68-yard pass from Dewayne Coleman, Dawson Jones kick (Drive: 4 plays, 75 yards, 0:39; North Texas 38–35)
- (0:09) ARMY – Dawson Jones 23-yard field goal (Drive: 14 plays, 50 yards, 2:40; Tied 38–38)

Overtime

- UNT – Caleb Hawkins 3-yard run, Kali Nguma kick (Drive: 5 plays, 25 yards; North Texas 45–38)

Statistics	UNT	ARMY
First downs	26	26
Plays–yards	78–478	82–488
Rushes–yards	42–229	68–387
Passing yards	249	101
Passing: comp–att–int	26–36–0	6–14–1
Turnovers	1	3
Time of possession	27:59	32:01

Team	Category	Player	Statistics
North Texas	Passing	Drew Mestemaker	26/36, 249 yards, TD
North Texas	Rushing	Makenzie McGill II	19 carries, 101 yards, TD
North Texas	Receiving	Miles Coleman	8 receptions, 74 yards
Army	Passing	Dewayne Coleman	6/11, 101 yards, 2 TD
Army	Rushing	Dewayne Coleman	23 carries, 117 yards, TD
Army	Receiving	Brady Anderson	1 reception, 68 yards, TD

=== South Alabama ===
South Alabama Jaguars (1–3) at North Texas Mean Green (4–0) – Game summary

Quarter	1	2	3	4	Total
Jaguars	7	0	7	8	22
Mean Green	7	7	14	8	36

at DATCU Stadium • Denton, Texas

- Date: September 27
- Game time: 11:00 a.m. CDT
- Game weather: Sunny • Temperature: 79 °F (26 °C) • Wind: E at 5 miles per hour (8.0 km/h)
- Game attendance: 16,575
- Referee: Steven Robinson
- TV announcers (ESPNU): Matt Schumacker (play-by-play) and Dustin Fox (analyst)

Game information

First Quarter

- (10:40) USA – Bishop Davenport 2-yard run, Hamilton DiBoyan kick (Drive: 10 plays, 75 yards, 4:20; South Alabama 7–0)
- (7:04) UNT – Miles Coleman 18-yard run, Kali Nguma kick (Drive: 8 plays, 75 yards, 3:36; Tied 7–7)

Second Quarter

- (7:19) UNT – Caleb Hawkins 6-yard run, Kali Nguma kick (Drive: 4 plays, 35 yards, 1:10; North Texas 14–7)

Third Quarter

- (10:25) UNT – Caleb Hawkins 68-yard pass from Drew Mestemaker, Kali Nguma kick (Drive: 2 plays, 64 yards, 0:35; North Texas 21–7)
- (6:00) USA – Rod Gibbs 1-yard pass from Bishop Davenport, Hamilton DiBoyan kick (Drive: 12 plays, 75 yards, 4:25; North Texas 21–14)
- (2:08) UNT – Drew Mestemaker 4-yard run, Kali Nguma kick (Drive: 7 plays, 47 yards, 3:43; North Texas 28–14)

Fourth Quarter

- (6:11) USA – Kentrel Bullock 2-yard run, Bishop Davenport run (Drive: 10 plays, 87 yards, 4:04; North Texas 28–22)
- (1:59) UNT – Caleb Hawkins 27-yard run, Wyatt Young pass (Drive: 7 plays, 75 yards, 4:12; North Texas 36–22)

Statistics	USA	UNT
First downs	19	20
Plays–yards	80–396	65–429
Rushes–yards	45–204	39–195
Passing yards	192	234
Passing: comp–att–int	18–35–0	14–26–1
Turnovers	1	1
Time of possession	32:28	27:32

Team	Category	Player	Statistics
South Alabama	Passing	Bishop Davenport	17/34, 195 yards, TD, INT
South Alabama	Rushing	PJ Martin	10 carries, 60 yards
South Alabama	Receiving	Devin Voisin	5 receptions, 97 yards
North Texas	Passing	Drew Mestemaker	14/26, 234 yards, TD
North Texas	Rushing	Caleb Hawkins	16 carries, 140 yards, 2 TD
North Texas	Receiving	Caleb Hawkins	2 receptions, 78 yards, TD

With the win, the Mean Green improved to 5–0, the program's first 5–0 start to a season since 1959.

=== No. 24 South Florida ===
No. 24 South Florida Bulls (4–1) at North Texas Mean Green (5–0) – Game summary

Quarter	1	2	3	4	Total
No. 24 Bulls	7	14	28	14	63
Mean Green	14	7	7	8	36

at DATCU Stadium • Denton, Texas

- Date: October 10
- Game time: 6:30 p.m. CDT
- Game weather: Sunny • Temperature: 84 °F (29 °C) • Wind: E at 2 miles per hour (3.2 km/h)
- Game attendance: 31,386
- Referee: Kevin Randall
- TV announcers (ESPN2): Anish Shroff (play-by-play), Andre Ware (analyst), and Paul Carcaterra (sideline)

Game information

First quarter

- (8:42) UNT – Drew Mestemaker 2-yard run, Kali Nguma kick (Drive: 8 plays, 40 yards, 4:00; North Texas 7–0)
- (2:41) USF – Byrum Brown 7-yard run, Nico Gramatica kick (Drive: 8 plays, 59 yards, 2:09; Tied 7–7)
- (0:12) UNT – Makenzie McGill II 23-yard run, Kali Nguma kick (Drive: 6 plays, 75 yards, 2:26; North Texas 14–7)

Second quarter

- (9:37) USF – Jeremiah Koger 14-yard pass from Byrum Brown, Nico Gramatica kick (Drive: 12 plays, 76 yards, 3:54; Tied 14–14)
- (6:12) UNT – Wyatt Young 11-yard run, Kali Nguma kick (Drive: 9 plays, 65 yards, 3:25; North Texas 21–14)
- (0:02) USF – Jonathan Echols 2-yard pass from Byrum Brown, Nico Gramatica kick (Drive: 5 plays, 17 yards, 0:41; Tied 21–21)

Third quarter

- (13:51) USF – Keshaun Singleton 29-yard pass from Christian Neptune, Nico Gramatica kick (Drive: 4 plays, 75 yards, 1:09; South Florida 28–21)
- (12:35) USF – Sam Franklin 11-yard run, Nico Gramatica kick (Drive: 2 plays, 15 yards, 0:24; South Florida 35–21)
- (11:35) USF – Jhalyn Shuler 34-yard fumble recovery, Nico Gramatica kick (South Florida 42–21)
- (9:35) UNT – Miles Coleman 54-yard pass from Drew Mestemaker, Kali Nguma kick (Drive: 4 plays, 68 yards, 1:55; South Florida 42–28)
- (8:14) USF – Jeremiah Koger 63-yard pass from Byrum Brown, Nico Gramatica kick (Drive: 5 plays, 86 yards, 1:16; South Florida 49–28)

Fourth quarter

- (13:49) USF – Cole Skinner 1-yard run, Nico Gramatica kick (Drive: 10 plays, 49 yards, 2:53; South Florida 56–28)
- (8:15) UNT – Tre Williams III 10-yard pass from Drew Mestemaker, Dalton Carnes pass (Drive: 14 plays, 75 yards, 5:34; South Florida 56–36)
- (5:51) USF – Byrum Brown 9-yard run, Nico Gramatica kick (Drive: 4 plays, 44 yards, 2:01; South Florida 63–36)

Statistics	USF	UNT
First downs	32	26
Plays–yards	86–580	78–423
Rushes–yards	57–306	29–97
Passing yards	274	326
Passing: comp–att–int	23–29–1	30–49–3
Turnovers	3	5
Time of possession	29:05	30:55

Team	Category	Player	Statistics
South Florida	Passing	Byrum Brown	22/28, 245 yards, 3 TD, INT
South Florida	Rushing	Byrum Brown	21 carries, 82 yards, 2 TD
South Florida	Receiving	Jeremiah Koger	4 receptions, 94 yards, 2 TD
North Texas	Passing	Drew Mestemaker	30/48, 326 yards, 2 TD, 3 INT
North Texas	Rushing	Caleb Hawkins	15 carries, 49 yards
North Texas	Receiving	Miles Coleman	7 receptions, 101 yards, TD

=== UTSA ===
UTSA Roadrunners (3–3) at North Texas Mean Green (5–1) – Game summary

Quarter	1	2	3	4	Total
Roadrunners	7	7	3	0	17
Mean Green	17	7	21	10	55

at DATCU Stadium • Denton, Texas

- Date: October 18
- Game time: 3:00 p.m. CDT
- Game weather: Rain • Temperature: 75 °F (24 °C)
- Game attendance: 25,053
- Referee: Tim Rich
- TV announcers (ESPN+): James Westling (play-by-play), Leger Douzable (analyst) and Maria Trivelpiece (sideline)

Game information

First quarter

- (13:30) UTSA – Houston Thomas 3-yard pass from Owen McCown, Michael Petro kick (Drive: 3 plays, 75 yards, 1:30; UTSA 7–0)
- (7:31) UNT – Kali Nguma 28-yard field goal (Drive: 14 plays, 63 yards, 5:53; UTSA 7–3)
- (3:11) UNT – Wyatt Young 20-yard pass from Drew Mestemaker, Kali Nguma kick (Drive: 7 plays, 69 yards, 2:45; North Texas 10–7)
- (0:00) UNT – Wyatt Young 11-yard pass from Drew Mestemaker, Kali Nguma kick (Drive: 5 plays, 73 yards, 1:42; North Texas 17–7)

Second quarter

- (5:22) UTSA – Robert Henry 3-yard run, Michael Petro kick (Drive: 3 plays, 50 yards, 1:14; North Texas 17–14)
- (0:09) UNT – Kiefer Sibley 18-yard run, Kali Nguma kick (Drive: 13 plays, 76 yards, 2:03; North Texas 24–14)

Third quarter

- (11:30) UNT – Cameron Dorner 15-yard pass from Drew Mestemaker, Kali Nguma kick (Drive: 8 plays, 75 yards, 3:30; North Texas 31–14)
- (9:58) UNT – Drew Mestemaker 1-yard run, Kali Nguma kick (Drive: 3 plays, 19 yards, 1:21; North Texas 38–14)
- (2:57) UTSA – Michael Petro 29-yard field goal (Drive: 12 plays, 62 yards, 4:31; North Texas 38–17)
- (0:55) UNT – Wyatt Young 42-yard pass from Drew Mestemaker, Kali Nguma kick (Drive: 4 plays, 80 yards, 1:58; North Texas 45–17)

Fourth quarter

- (13:24) UNT – Kali Nguma 19-yard field goal (Drive: 6 plays, 13 yards, 2:21; North Texas 48–17)
- (6:01) UNT – Terrence Lewis 37-yard pass from Chris Jimerson Jr., Kali Nguma kick (Drive: 5 plays, 71 yards, 3:12; North Texas 55–17)

Statistics	UTSA	UNT
First downs	14	34
Plays–yards	57–329	81–584
Rushes–yards	32–214	44–270
Passing yards	115	314
Passing: comp–att–int	15–25–0	23–37–0
Turnovers	3	0
Time of possession	26:21	33:39

Team	Category	Player	Statistics
UTSA	Passing	Owen McCown	11/20, 84 yards, TD
UTSA	Rushing	Robert Henry Jr.	12 carries, 138 yards, TD
UTSA	Receiving	AJ Wilson	4 catches, 35 yards
North Texas	Passing	Drew Mestemaker	22/35, 227 yards, 4 TD
North Texas	Rushing	Caleb Hawkins	18 carries, 133 yards
North Texas	Receiving	Wyatt Young	6 catches, 102 yards, 3 TD

=== at Charlotte ===
North Texas Mean Green (6–1) at Charlotte 49ers (1–6) – Game summary

Quarter	1	2	3	4	Total
Mean Green	7	10	10	27	54
49ers	10	7	3	0	20

at Jerry Richardson Stadium • Charlotte, North Carolina

- Date: October 24
- Game time: 6:00 p.m. CDT / 7:00 p.m. EDT
- Game weather: Clear • Temperature: 57 °F (14 °C) • Wind: S at 0 miles per hour (0 km/h)
- Game attendance: 9,626
- Referee: Matt Overton
- TV announcers (ESPN2): Mike Corey (play-by-play) and Rene Ingoglia (analyst)

Game information

First quarter

- (12:25) UNT – Cameron Dorner 41-yard pass from Drew Mestemaker, Kali Nguma kick (Drive: 3 plays, 80 yards, 0:50; North Texas 7–0)
- (7:53) CLT – Liam Boyd 24-yard field goal (Drive: 10 plays, 57 yards, 4:26; North Texas 7–3)
- (1:15) CLT – Javen Nicholas 33-yard pass from Grayson Loftis, Liam Boyd kick (Drive: 10 plays, 84 yards, 4:42; Charlotte 10–7)

Second quarter

- (11:27) CLT – Javen Nicholas 64-yard pass from Grayson Loftis, Liam Boyd kick (Drive: 1 play, 65 yards, 0:07; Charlotte 17–7)
- (8:30) UNT – Kali Nguma 29-yard field goal (Drive: 9 plays, 58 yards, 2:49; Charlotte 17–10)
- (4:14) UNT – Caleb Hawkins 6-yard pass from Drew Mestemaker, Kali Nguma kick (Drive: 6 plays, 91 yards, 2:18; Tied 17–17)

Third quarter

- (8:17) CLT – Liam Boyd 20-yard field goal (Drive: 9 plays, 80 yards, 4:06; Charlotte 20–17)
- (5:53) UNT – Kiefer Sibley 1-yard run, Kali Nguma kick (Drive: 6 plays, 75 yards, 2:24; North Texas 24–20)
- (0:17) UNT – Kali Nguma 41-yard field goal (Drive: 5 plays, 20 yards, 1:37; North Texas 27–20)

Fourth quarter

- (12:26) UNT – Caleb Hawkins 7-yard pass from Drew Mestemaker, Kali Nguma kick (Drive: 4 plays, 23 yards, 1:31; North Texas 34–20)
- (9:03) UNT – Wyatt Young 70-yard pass from Drew Mestemaker (Drive: 3 plays, 65 yards, 1:30; North Texas 40–20)
- (7:04) UNT – Kiefer Sibley 45-yard run, Kali Nguma kick (Drive: 2 plays, 49 yards, 0:53; North Texas 47–20)
- (1:06) UNT – Ashton Gray 32-yard run, Kali Nguma kick (Drive: 7 plays, 55 yards, 3:50; North Texas 54–20)

Statistics	UNT	CLT
First downs	32	13
Plays–yards	78–754	63–399
Rushes–yards	29–146	27–104
Passing yards	608	295
Passing: comp–att–int	37–49–1	20–36–0
Turnovers	2	0
Time of possession	30:38	29:22

Team	Category	Player	Statistics
North Texas	Passing	Drew Mestemaker	37/49, 608 yards, 4 TD, INT
North Texas	Rushing	Kiefer Sibley	7 carries, 71 yards, 2 TD
North Texas	Receiving	Wyatt Young	9 receptions, 190 yards, TD
Charlotte	Passing	Grayson Loftis	20/36, 295 yards, 2 TD
Charlotte	Rushing	Jariel Cobb	13 carries, 59 yards
Charlotte	Receiving	Javen Nicholas	7 receptions, 187 yards, 2 TD

=== Navy ===
Navy Midshipmen (7–0) at North Texas Mean Green (7–1) – Game summary

Quarter	1	2	3	4	Total
Midshipmen	0	10	7	0	17
Mean Green	14	10	7	0	31

at DATCU Stadium • Denton, Texas

- Date: November 1
- Game time: 11:00 a.m. CDT
- Game weather: Cloudy • Temperature: 61 °F (16 °C) • Wind: NW at 8 miles per hour (13 km/h)
- Game attendance: 26,516
- Referee: Edwin Lee
- TV announcers (ESPN2): Lowell Galindo (play-by-play), Aaron Murray (analyst) and Lauren Sisler (sideline)

Game information

First quarter

- (11:57) UNT – Caleb Hawkins 7-yard run, Kali Nguma kick (Drive: 8 plays, 76 yards, 2:59; North Texas 7–0)
- (3:32) UNT – Caleb Hawkins 3-yard run, Kali Nguma kick (Drive: 10 plays, 86 yards, 3:31; North Texas 14–0)

Second quarter

- (7:14) NAVY – Nathan Kirkwood 26-yard field goal (Drive: 12 plays, 54 yards, 6:48; North Texas 14–3)
- (5:46) UNT – Caleb Hawkins 14-yard run, Kali Nguma kick (Drive: 5 plays, 31 yards, 1:28; North Texas 21–3)
- (1:59) NAVY – Brandon Chatman 31-yard run, Nathan Kirkwood kick (Drive: 6 plays, 61 yards, 3:39; North Texas 21–10)
- (0:03) UNT – Kali Nguma 21-yard field goal (Drive: 11 plays, 75 yards, 1:52; North Texas 24–10)

Third quarter

- (9:48) NAVY – Blake Horvath 13-yard run, Nathan Kirkwood kick (Drive: 8 plays, 70 yards, 5:12; North Texas 24–17)
- (0:46) UNT – Caleb Hawkins 6-yard run, Kali Nguma kick (Drive: 10 plays, 50 yards, 4:13; North Texas 31–17)

Fourth quarter

- No scoring plays.

Statistics	NAVY	UNT
First downs	22	22
Plays–yards	58–391	69–424
Rushes–yards	44–311	45–190
Passing yards	80	234
Passing: comp–att–int	8–14–2	19–24–0
Turnovers	3	0
Time of possession	32:13	27:47

Team	Category	Player	Statistics
Navy	Passing	Blake Horvath	8/14, 80 yards, 2 INT
Navy	Rushing	Blake Horvath	19 carries, 112 yards, TD
Navy	Receiving	Eli Heidenreich	6 receptions, 68 yards
North Texas	Passing	Drew Mestemaker	19/24, 234 yards
North Texas	Rushing	Caleb Hawkins	33 carries, 197 yards, 4 TD
North Texas	Receiving	Cameron Dorner	3 receptions, 78 yards

=== at UAB ===
North Texas Mean Green (8–1) at UAB Blazers (3–6) – Game summary

Quarter	1	2	3	4	Total
Mean Green	21	10	15	7	53
Blazers	0	7	11	6	24

at Protective Stadium • Birmingham, Alabama

- Date: November 15
- Game time: 1:00 p.m. CST
- Game weather: Sunny • Temperature: 77 °F (25 °C) • Wind: SW at 12 miles per hour (19 km/h)
- Game attendance: 16,190
- Referee: Charles Lamertina
- TV announcers (ESPN+): Shawn Kenney (play-by-play), Tyoka Jackson (analyst) and Savanna Collins (sideline)

Game information

First quarter

- (8:48) UNT – Caleb Hawkins 1-yard run, Kali Nguma kick (Drive: 14 plays, 75 yards, 6:12; North Texas 7–0)
- (4:15) UNT – Caleb Hawkins 4-yard run, Kali Nguma kick (Drive: 6 plays, 56 yards, 2:38; North Texas 14–0)
- (3:11) UNT - Caleb Hawkins 11-yard run, Kali Nguma kick (Drive: 4 plays, 22 yards, 0:29; North Texas 21-0)

Second quarter

- (11:07) UNT – Caleb Hawkins 9-yard run, Kali Nguma kick (Drive: 2 plays, 70 yards, 0:34; North Texas 28–0)
- (5:34) UAB – Brandon Hawkins Jr. 32-yard pass from Jalen Kitna, Jonah Delange kick (Drive: 10 plays, 75 yards, 5:33; North Texas 28-7)
- (3:23) UNT – Kali Nguma 46-yard field goal (Drive: 6 plays, 14 yards, 1:59; North Texas 31–7)

Third quarter

- (11:55) UAB - Ryder Burton 1-yard run, Jalen Kitna pass to Brandon Hawkins Jr. for two-point conversion (Drive: 6 plays, 75 yards, 3:05; North Texas 31-15)
- (9:37) UNT - Wyatt Young 7-yard pass from Drew Mestemaker, Kali Nguma kick (Drive: 5 plays, 49 yards, 2:08; North Texas 38-15)
- (6:37) UAB - Jonah Delange 46-yard field goal (Drive: 8 plays, 47 yards, 3:00; North Texas 38-18)
- (3:26) UNT - Caleb Hawkins 5-yard run, Drew Mestemaker pass to Wyatt Young for two-point conversion (Drive: 8 plays, 75 yards, 3:11; North Texas 46-18)

Fourth quarter

- (12:00) UAB - Isaiah Jacobs 6-yard run, two-point pass conversion failed (Drive: 15 plays, 75 yards, 6:26; North Texas 46-24)
- (3:00) UNT - Cameron Dorner 30-yard pass from Drew Mestemaker, Kali Nguma kick (Drive: 8 plays, 99 yards, 5:23; North Texas 53-24)

Statistics	UNT	UAB
First downs	22	26
Plays–yards	60–506	85–478
Rushes–yards	34–208	35–190
Passing yards	298	288
Passing: comp–att–int	18–25–0	26–45–2
Turnovers	0	4
Time of possession	24:51	35:09

Team	Category	Player	Statistics
North Texas	Passing	Drew Mestemaker	18/25, 298 yards, 2 TD
North Texas	Rushing	Caleb Hawkins	27 carries, 189 yards, 5 TD
North Texas	Receiving	Wyatt Young	8 receptions, 143 yards, TD
UAB	Passing	Jalen Kitna	26/45, 281 yards, TD, 2 INT
UAB	Rushing	Jevon Jackson	16 carries, 159 yards
UAB	Receiving	Brandon Hawkins Jr.	6 receptions, 127 yards, TD

=== at Rice ===
North Texas Mean Green (9–1) at Rice Owls (5–5) – Game summary

Quarter	1	2	3	4	Total
Mean Green	7	21	14	14	56
Owls	14	0	7	3	24

at Rice Stadium • Houston, Texas

- Date: November 22
- Game time: 6:30 p.m. CST
- Game weather: Clear • Temperature: 73 °F (23 °C) • Wind: N at 5 miles per hour (8.0 km/h)
- Game attendance: 24,598
- Referee: Kevin Randall
- TV announcers (ESPNU): Lowell Galindo (play-by-play), Aaron Murray (analyst), and Lauren Sisler (sideline)

Game information

First quarter

- (8:56) RICE - Chase Jenkins 18-yard run, Enock Gota kick (Drive: 12 plays, 86 yards, 6:00; Rice 7-0)
- (1:42) RICE - Aaron Turner 12-yard run, Enock Gota kick (Drive: 10 plays, 71 yards, 5:56; Rice 14-0)
- (0:52) UNT - Wyatt Young 74-yard pass from Drew Mestemaker, Kali Nguma kick (Drive: 2 plays, 76 yards, 0:42; Rice 14-7)

Second quarter

- (10:26) UNT - Caleb Hawkins 4-yard run, Kali Nguma kick (Drive: 7 plays, 52 yards, 2:29; Tied 14-14)
- (6:34) UNT - Tre Williams III 56-yard pass from Drew Mestemaker, Kali Nguma kick (Drive: 6 plays, 77 yards, 2:25; North Texas 21-14)
- (3:05) UNT - Wyatt Young 84-yard pass from Drew Mestemaker, Kali Nguma kick (Drive: 1 play, 84 yards, 0:16; North Texas 28-14)

Third quarter

- (12:55) UNT - Drew Mestemaker 1-yard run, Kali Nguma kick (Drive: 5 plays, 71 yards, 2:00; North Texas 35-14)
- (3:14) UNT - Caleb Hawkins 7-yard run, Kali Nguma kick (Drive: 9 plays, 86 yards, 3:58; North Texas 42-14)
- (0:04) RICE - Aaron Turner 15-yard pass from Chase Jenkins, Enock Gota kick (Drive: 7 plays, 75 yards, 3:10; North Texas 42-21)

Fourth quarter

- (12:10) UNT - Caleb Hawkins 8-yard run, Kali Nguma kick (Drive: 7 plays, 75 yards, 2:54; North Texas 49-21)
- (5:38) RICE - Enock Gota 27-yard field goal (Drive: 13 plays, 66 yards, 6:30; North Texas 49-24)
- (3:46) UNT - Ashton Gray 11-yard run, Kali Nguma kick (Drive: 4 plays, 47 yards, 1:51; North Texas 56-24)

Statistics	UNT	RICE
First downs	25	24
Plays–yards	55–640	74–397
Rushes–yards	32–171	53–296
Passing yards	469	101
Passing: comp–att–int	19–23–0	14–21–0
Turnovers	0	0
Time of possession	22:15	37:45

Team	Category	Player	Statistics
North Texas	Passing	Drew Mestemaker	19/23, 469 yards, 3 TD
North Texas	Rushing	Caleb Hawkins	20 carries, 97 yards, 3 TD
North Texas	Receiving	Wyatt Young	8 receptions, 295 yards, 2 TD
Rice	Passing	Chase Jenkins	14/21, 101 yards, TD
Rice	Rushing	Aaron Turner	9 carries, 78 yards, TD
Rice	Receiving	Aaron Turner	8 receptions, 58 yards, TD

=== Temple ===
Temple Owls (5–6) at North Texas Mean Green (10–1) – Game summary

Quarter	1	2	3	4	Total
Owls	7	0	7	11	25
Mean Green	14	21	10	7	52

at DATCU Stadium • Denton, Texas

- Date: November 28
- Game time: 2:30 p.m. CST
- Game weather: Cloudy • Temperature: 57 °F (14 °C)
- Game attendance: 24,492
- Referee: Tim Rich
- TV announcers (ESPN): Clay Matvick (play-by-play), Chase Daniel (analyst) and Tori Petry (sideline)

Game information

First quarter

- (8:18) UNT - Cameron Dorner 77-yard pass from Drew Mestemaker, Kali Nguma kick (Drive: 5 plays, 99 yards, 1:58; North Texas 7-0)
- (2:42) TEM - Ryder Kusch 2-yard pass from Evan Simon, Carl Hardin kick (Drive: 11 plays, 75 yards, 5:36; Tied 7-7)
- (1:08) UNT - Caleb Hawkins 5-yard run, Kali Nguma kick (Drive: 4 plays, 34 yards, 1:24; North Texas 14-7)

Second quarter

- (10:09) UNT - Caleb Hawkins 31-yard run, Kali Nguma kick (Drive: 5 plays, 99 yards, 1:46; North Texas 21-7)
- (6:22) UNT - Terrence Lewis 5-yard pass from Drew Mestemaker, Kali Nguma kick (Drive: 4 plays, 30 yards, 2:19; North Texas 28-7)
- (1:25) UNT - Caleb Hawkins 6-yard run, Kali Nguma kick (Drive: 9 plays, 78 yards, 3:25; North Texas 35-7)

Third quarter

- (11:39) TEM - Peter Clarke 16-yard pass from Jay Ducker, Carl Hardin kick (Drive: 6 plays, 38 yards, 3:13; North Texas 35-14)
- (7:07) UNT - Kali Nguma 27-yard field goal (Drive: 8 plays, 67 yards, 4:32; North Texas 38-14)
- (0:40) UNT - Terrence Lewis 13-yard pass from Drew Mestemaker, Kali Nguma kick (Drive: 7 plays, 63 yards, 3:25; North Texas 45-14)

Fourth quarter

- (11:14) TEM - Jay Ducker 5-yard run, Gevani McCoy pass to Ryder Kusch for two-point conversion (Drive: 2 plays, 5 yards, 0:10; North Texas 45-22)
- (8:25) UNT - Caleb Hawkins 1-yard run, Kali Nguma kick (Drive: 5 plays, 87 yards, 2:48; North Texas 52-22)
- (4:16) TEM - Carl Hardin 26-yard field goal (Drive: 10 plays, 67 yards, 4:09; North Texas 52-25)

Statistics	TEM	UNT
First downs	18	26
Plays–yards	70–316	64–605
Rushes–yards	37–172	40–239
Passing yards	144	366
Passing: comp–att–int	13–33–1	20–24–0
Turnovers	1	2
Time of possession	31:02	28:58

Team	Category	Player	Statistics
Temple	Passing	Evan Simon	10/27, 82 yards, TD, INT
Temple	Rushing	Hunter Smith	10 carries, 66 yards
Temple	Receiving	Colin Chase	3 receptions, 55 yards
North Texas	Passing	Drew Mestemaker	20/24, 366 yards, 3 TD
North Texas	Rushing	Caleb Hawkins	25 carries, 186 yards, 4 TD
North Texas	Receiving	Wyatt Young	6 receptions, 127 yards

=== at No. 20 Tulane (American Conference Championship Game) ===
No. 24 North Texas Mean Green (11–1) at No. 20 Tulane Green Wave (10–2) – Game summary

Quarter	1	2	3	4	Total
No. 24 Mean Green	7	0	6	8	21
No. 20 Green Wave	7	17	7	3	34

at Yulman Stadium • New Orleans, Louisiana

- Date: December 5
- Game time: 7:00 p.m. CST
- Game weather: Overcast • Temperature: 52 °F (11 °C) • Wind: NNW at 6 miles per hour (9.7 km/h)
- Game attendance: 23,986
- Referee: Kevin Randall
- TV announcers (ABC): Mark Jones (play-by-play), Roddy Jones (analyst) and Quint Kessenich (sideline)

Game information

First quarter

- UNT – Tre Williams III 10-yard pass from Drew Mestemaker (Kali Nguma kick), 8:32. Mean Green 7–0. Drive: 15 plays, 75 yards, 6:28.
- TULN – Jake Retzlaff 2-yard run (Patrick Durkin kick), 0:30. Tied 7–7. Drive: 16 plays, 81 yards, 7:57.

Second quarter

- TULN – Jamauri McClure 7-yard run (Patrick Durkin kick), 12:29. Green Wave 14–7. Drive: 2 plays, 37 yards, 0:55.
- TULN – Patrick Durkin 30-yard field goal, 5:46. Green Wave 17–7. Drive: 10 plays, 46 yards, 4:39.
- TULN – Jake Retzlaff 1-yard run (Patrick Durkin kick), 0:03. Green Wave 24–7. Drive: 6 plays, 13 yards, 0:47.

Third quarter

- TULN – Chris Rodgers 35-yard interception return (Patrick Durkin kick), 7:32. Green Wave 31–7.
- UNT – Miles Coleman 59-yard pass from Drew Mestemaker (pass failed), 0:16. Green Wave 31–13. Drive: 4 plays, 60 yards, 1:03.

Fourth quarter

- UNT – Ashton Gray 9-yard run (Ashton Gray run), 9:26. Green Wave 31–21. Drive: 8 plays, 88 yards, 2:54.
- TULN – Patrick Durkin 30-yard field goal, 2:51. Green Wave 34–21. Drive: 12 plays, 66 yards, 6:29.

Statistics	UNT	TULN
First downs	25	22
Plays–yards	68–415	74–344
Rushes–yards	34–121	52–199
Passing yards	294	145
Passing: comp–att–int	21–34–3	13–22–0
Turnovers	5	0
Time of possession	24:52	35:08

Team	Category	Player	Statistics
North Texas	Passing	Drew Mestemaker	21/34, 294 yards, 2 TD, 3 INT
North Texas	Rushing	Ashton Gray	8 carries, 47 yards, TD
North Texas	Receiving	Miles Coleman	7 receptions, 125 yards, TD
Tulane	Passing	Jake Retzlaff	13/22, 145 yards
Tulane	Rushing	Jamauri McClure	22 carries, 121 yards, TD
Tulane	Receiving	Garrett Mmahat	3 receptions, 39 yards

=== vs. San Diego State (New Mexico Bowl) ===
2025 Isleta New Mexico Bowl
No. 25 North Texas Mean Green (11-2) vs. San Diego State Aztecs (9-3) – Game summary

Quarter	1	2	3	4	Total
No. 25 Mean Green	21	7	14	7	49
Aztecs	6	14	0	27	47

at University Stadium • Albuquerque, New Mexico

- Date: December 27
- Game time: 4:45 p.m. CST / 3:45 p.m. MST
- Game weather: Cloudy • Temperature: 53 °F (12 °C) • Wind: 5 mph (8.0 km/h) southwest
- Game attendance: 18,867
- Referee: Andrew Speciale
- TV announcers (ESPN): Lowell Galindo (play-by-play), Aaron Murray (analyst) and Lauren Sisler (sideline)

Game information

First quarter

- UNT – Caleb Hawkins 9-yard run (Miguel Arenas kick), 11:32. Mean Green 7–0. Drive: 12 plays, 68 yards, 3:24.
- SDSU – Bert Emanuel Jr. 8-yard run (pass failed), 6:57. Mean Green 7–6. Drive: 10 plays, 65 yards, 4:35.
- UNT – Ashton Gray 17-yard run (Miguel Arenas kick), 3:18. Mean Green 14–6. Drive: 10 plays, 75 yards, 3:39.
- UNT – Caleb Hawkins 23-yard pass from Drew Mestemaker (Miguel Arenas kick), 0:10. Mean Green 21–6. Drive: 5 plays, 67 yards, 2:02.

Second quarter

- SDSU – Bert Emanual Jr. 72-yard run (Gabriel Plascencia kick), 14:49. Mean Green 21–13. Drive: 2 plays, 75 yards, 0:21.
- UNT – Ashton Gray 51-yard run (Miguel Arenas kick), 13:28. Mean Green 28–13. Drive: 5 plays, 75 yards, 1:21.
- SDSU – Jackson Ford 3-yard pass from Kyle Crum (Gabriel Plascencia kick), 4:36. Mean Green 28–20. Drive: 15 plays, 68 yards, 6:31.

Third quarter

- UNT – Caleb Hawkins 3-yard run (Miguel Arenas kick), 6:34. Mean Green 35–20. Drive: 11 plays, 43 yards, 4:21.
- UNT – Cameron Dorner 1-yard pass from Drew Mestemaker (Miguel Arenas kick), 0:03. Mean Green 42–20. Drive: 5 plays, 75 yards, 2:11.

Fourth quarter

- SDSU – Kyle Crum 11-yard run (Gabriel Plascencia kick), 12:03. Mean Green 42–27. Drive: 4 plays, 71 yards, 1:29.
- SDSU – Nathan Acevedo 63-yard punt return (Gabriel Plascencia kick), 10:41. Mean Green 42–34.
- UNT – Cameron Dorner 31-yard pass from Drew Mestemaker (Miguel Arenas kick), 6:08. Mean Green 49–34. Drive: 11 plays, 74 yards, 4:33.
- SDSU – Christian Washington 11-yard run (run failed), 4:39. Mean Green 49–40. Drive: 6 plays, 75 yards, 1:29.
- SDSU – Kyle Crum 1-yard run (Gabriel Plascencia kick), 0:01. Mean Green 49–47. Drive: 14 plays, 82 yards, 1:49.

Statistics	UNT	SDSU
First downs	28	25
Plays–yards	97–618	82–532
Rushes–yards	48–368	46–326
Passing yards	250	206
Passing: comp–att–int	27–49–2	18–36–2
Turnovers	2	3
Time of possession	32:32	27:28

Team	Category	Player	Statistics
North Texas	Passing	Drew Mestemaker	27/47, 250 yards, 3 TD, 2 INT
North Texas	Rushing	Caleb Hawkins	30 carries, 198 yards, 2 TD
North Texas	Receiving	Cameron Dorner	6 receptions, 66 yards, 2 TD
San Diego State	Passing	Kyle Crum	14/29, 169 yards, TD, 2 INT
San Diego State	Rushing	Bert Emanuel Jr.	11 carries, 170 yards, 2 TD
San Diego State	Receiving	Nathan Acevedo	4 receptions, 61 yards
