= 2025 New Mexico Bowl =

Postseason college football bowl game

2025 Isleta New Mexico Bowl
- 20th New Mexico Bowl
| North Texas Mean Green | San Diego State Aztecs |
| (11–2) | (9–3) |
| American | MW |
| 49 | 47 |
| Head coach: Drew Svoboda (interim) | Head coach: Sean Lewis |
| AP / Coaches / CFP; 23 / NR / 25 |
| | 1 | 2 | 3 | 4 | Total |
|---|---|---|---|---|---|
| North Texas | 21 | 7 | 14 | 7 | 49 |
| San Diego State | 6 | 14 | 0 | 27 | 47 |
- Date: December 27, 2025
- Season: 2025
- Stadium: University Stadium
- Location: Albuquerque, New Mexico
- MVP: Off.: Caleb Hawkins (RB, North Texas); Def.: Will Jones II (S, North Texas)
- Favorite: North Texas by 6
- Referee: Andrew Speciale (MAC)
- Attendance: 18,867

United States TV coverage
- Network: ESPN
- Announcers: Lowell Galindo (play-by-play), Aaron Murray (analyst), and Lauren Sisler (sideline) (ESPN)

The 2025 New Mexico Bowl was a college football bowl game played on December 27, 2025, at University Stadium in Albuquerque, New Mexico. The 20th annual New Mexico Bowl began at approximately 3:45 p.m. MST and aired on ESPN. The New Mexico Bowl was one of the 2025–26 bowl games concluding the 2025 FBS football season. Isleta Pueblo, an indigenous community that owns and operates a resort and casino, sponsored the game, which was officially known as the Isleta New Mexico Bowl.

The 2025 New Mexico Bowl featured the North Texas Mean Green (11–2) of the American Conference and the San Diego State Aztecs (9–3) of the Mountain West Conference. North Texas beat San Diego State, 49–47.

== Teams ==
Based on conference tie-ins, the game was expected to feature teams from Conference USA (C-USA) and the Mountain West Conference. The announced matchup was San Diego State of Mountain West facing North Texas of the American Conference in place of a C-USA team. These teams had previously met seven times, most recently in 1975, with San Diego State holding a 6–1 lead in the series.

=== North Texas Mean Green ===
North Texas opened their season with five consecutive wins, then lost to 24th-ranked South Florida. The Mean Green won their next six games, and qualified for the American Conference Football Championship Game, where they lost to 20th-ranked Tulane. North Texas entered the New Mexico Bowl with an 11–2 record.

=== San Diego State Aztecs ===
San Diego State won six of their first seven games, only losing to Washington State. The Aztecs suffered two defeats in their final four regular-season games—to Hawaii and New Mexico—and entered the New Mexico Bowl with a 9–3 record.

== Game summary ==
2025 Isleta New Mexico Bowl

| Quarter | 1 | 2 | 3 | 4 | Total |
|---|---|---|---|---|---|
| No. 25 North Texas | 21 | 7 | 14 | 7 | 49 |
| San Diego State | 6 | 14 | 0 | 27 | 47 |

at University Stadium • Albuquerque, New Mexico

- Date: Saturday, December 27, 2025
- Game time: 3:45 p.m. MST
- Game weather: Cloudy • Temperature: 53 °F (12 °C) • Wind: 5 mph (8.0 km/h) southwest
- Game attendance: 18,867
- Referee: Andrew Speciale
- TV announcers (ESPN): Lowell Galindo (play-by-play), Aaron Murray (analyst), and Lauren Sisler (sideline)
- Box score

=== Statistics ===
| Statistics | UNT | SDSU |
|---|---|---|
| First downs | 28 | 25 |
| Plays–yards | 98–618 | 82–532 |
| Rushes–yards | 49–368 | 46–326 |
| Passing yards | 250 | 206 |
| Passing: comp–att–int | 27–49–2 | 18–36–2 |
| Turnovers | 2 | 3 |
| Time of possession | 32:31 | 27:29 |

| Team | Category | Player | Statistics |
|---|---|---|---|
| North Texas | Passing | Drew Mestemaker | 27/47, 250 yards, 3 TD, 2 INT |
| North Texas | Rushing | Caleb Hawkins | 30 carries, 198 yards, 2 TD |
| North Texas | Receiving | Cameron Dorner | 6 receptions, 66 yards, 2 TD |
| San Diego State | Passing | Kyle Crum | 14/29, 250 yards, 1 TD, 2 INT |
| San Diego State | Rushing | Bert Emanuel Jr. | 11 carries, 170 yards, 2 TD |
| San Diego State | Receiving | Nathan Acevedo | 4 receptions, 61 yards |
