= American Conference Football Championship Game =

Annual college football game

- Sport: Football
- Conference: American Conference
- Played: 2015–present
- Last contest: 2025
- Current champion: Tulane
- Most championships: UCF, 4
- TV partner: ABC
- Official website: theamerican.org/football

Sponsors
- Roofclaim.com (2021–2022)

Host stadiums
- Best conference team's home field (2015–present)

The American Conference Football Championship Game is a college football game currently held by the American Conference (American) (Note: The conference changed its name from "American Athletic Conference" in July 2025. With the name change, it officially stopped using an initialism, instead using "American".) each year to determine the conference's season champion. The inaugural game was held on December 5, 2015, at 12:00 pm ET.

The game previously pitted the champion of the Eastern Division (UCF, Cincinnati, Connecticut, East Carolina, South Florida, and Temple) against the champion of the Western Division (Houston, Memphis, Navy, SMU, Tulane, and Tulsa). The game was played at the home stadium of the division winner with the better conference record.

In 2020, UConn left the conference, leading to the dissolution of the divisions. Because of new NCAA rules regarding conference championships, the game has become a matchup between the top two teams in the conference.

Television broadcast rights to the game are owned by ESPN, with the game airing on ABC.

== History ==
The American was reorganized following the tumultuous period of realignment that hobbled the Big East between 2010 and 2013. In all, 14 member schools announced their departure for other conferences, and 15 other schools announced plans to join the conference (eight as all-sports members, and four for football only). In December 2012, the Big East's seven remaining non-FBS schools, all Catholic institutions – DePaul, Georgetown, Marquette, Providence, St. John's, Seton Hall, and Villanova – announced that they voted unanimously to leave the conference.

After a settlement in 2013 between the non-FBS schools and the FBS schools regarding the use of the conference name, the ten remaining football playing members renamed themselves the American Athletic Conference. In 2014, Louisville and Rutgers departed the conference and joined the ACC and Big Ten, respectively. Their departure was succeeded on the same day by the entrance of East Carolina, Tulane, and Tulsa for all sports. In 2015, the U.S. Naval Academy joined the conference for football, bringing the membership total in that sport to twelve teams. At which time, the conference split into two six-team divisions and established a football conference championship game.

On July 1, 2020, UConn officially left The American, with its football team becoming an FBS independent once the school joined the Big East. After a brief exploration period, The American elected not to add another team to rebalance divisions. Beginning with the 2020 season, divisions were eliminated, and since then the championship game has been played by the two teams that achieved the best record in regular season conference play. Despite further conference expansion in 2023–24, division play did not return.

SMU left for the Atlantic Coast Conference in 2024, with Army becoming a football-only replacement at the same time.

== Pre-championship game era ==
The 2013 and 2014 American Athletic Conference football champions were determined by the team(s) with the best conference record. There was no championship game held. In years when two or more teams tied in conference record, co-champions were declared.

Season	Champion/s	Conf. rec.	Over. rec.
2013	UCF	8–0	12–1
2014	Memphis	7–1	10–3
2014	Cincinnati	7–1	9–4
2014	UCF	7–1	9–4

== Results ==
Below are the results from all American Championship Games played. The winning team appears in bold font, on a background of their primary team color. Rankings are from the AP Poll released prior to the game.

Year	West Division		East Division		Venue	Att.	MVP
2015	17 **Houston**	**24**	20 Temple	13	TDECU Stadium • Houston, Texas	35,721	Greg Ward, Houston
2016	20 Navy	10	**Temple**	**34**	Navy–Marine Corps Memorial Stadium • Annapolis, Maryland	22,815	P. J. Walker, Temple
2017	16 Memphis	55	12 **UCF**	**62 (2OT)**	Spectrum Stadium • Orlando, Florida	41,433	McKenzie Milton, UCF
2018	Memphis	41	7 **UCF**	**56**	Spectrum Stadium • Orlando, Florida	45,176	Darriel Mack Jr., UCF
2019	16 **Memphis**	**29**	21 Cincinnati	24	Liberty Bowl Memorial Stadium • Memphis, Tennessee	33,008	Antonio Gibson, Memphis
Year	No. 1 seed		No. 2 seed		Venue	Att.	MVP
2020	6 **Cincinnati**	**27**	20 Tulsa	24	Nippert Stadium • Cincinnati, Ohio	5,831‡	Desmond Ridder, Cincinnati
2021	3 **Cincinnati**	**35**	16 Houston	20	Nippert Stadium • Cincinnati, Ohio	37,978	Jerome Ford, Cincinnati
2022	18 **Tulane**	**45**	22 UCF	28	Yulman Stadium • New Orleans, Louisiana	30,118	Michael Pratt, Tulane
2023	17 Tulane	14	25 **SMU**	**26**	Yulman Stadium • New Orleans, Louisiana	25,206	Isaiah Nwokobia, SMU
2024	24 **Army**	**35**	Tulane	14	Michie Stadium • West Point, New York	14,016	Bryson Daily, Army
2025	21 **Tulane**	**34**	20 North Texas	21	Yulman Stadium • New Orleans, Louisiana	23,986	Jack Tchienchou, Tulane
2026							

‡ 2020 game attendance limited due to the COVID-19 lockdowns.

=== Results by team ===
==== Current members ====
App.	School	Wins	Loss.	Pct.	Year(s) Won	Year(s) Lost
4	Tulane	2	2	.500	2022, 2025	2023, 2024
3	Memphis	1	2	.333	2019	2017, 2018
2	Temple	1	1	.500	2016	2015
1	Army	1	0	1.000	2024	
1	Navy	0	1	.000		2016
1	North Texas	0	1	.000		2025
1	Tulsa	0	1	.000		2020
0	Charlotte	0	0	–		
0	East Carolina	0	0	–		
0	Florida Atlantic	0	0	–		
0	Rice	0	0	–		
0	South Florida	0	0	–		
0	UAB	0	0	–		
0	UTSA	0	0	–		

==== Former members ====
App.	School	Wins	Loss.	Pct.	Year(s) Won	Year(s) Lost
3	UCF	2	1	.667	2017, 2018	2022
3	Cincinnati	2	1	.667	2020, 2021	2019
2	Houston	1	1	.500	2015	2021
1	SMU	1	0	1.000	2023	

=== Rematches ===
The American Conference Championship game has featured a rematch of a regular-season game a total of four times (2017, 2018, 2019, 2022). The team which won the regular-season game is 3–1 in the rematches, the exception being 2022.

=== No results by team ===
School
UConn

- Charlotte, East Carolina, Florida Atlantic, Rice, South Florida, UAB and UTSA have yet to make an appearance in an American Conference Championship Game.
- UConn never made an appearance in the American Championship Game prior to its move to FBS independent status in 2020.

== Game records ==
Team	Record, Team vs. Opponent	Year
Most points scored (one team)	62, UCF vs. Memphis	2017
Most points scored (losing team)	55, Memphis vs. UCF	2017
Most points scored (both teams)	117, UCF (62) vs. Memphis (55)	2017
Fewest points scored (winning team)	24, Houston vs. Temple	2015
Fewest points allowed	10, Temple vs. Navy	2016
Fewest points scored (both teams)	37, Houston (24) vs. Temple (13)	2015
Most points scored in a half	38, Memphis (1st half) vs. UCF	2018
Most points scored in a half (both teams)	59, UCF vs. Memphis (1st half)	2018
Largest margin of victory	24, Temple (34) vs. Navy (10)	2016
Smallest margin of victory	3, Cincinnati (27) vs. Tulsa (24)	2020
Total yards	753, Memphis (471 passing, 282 rushing) vs. UCF	2017
Rushing yards	401, Memphis vs. UCF	2018
Passing yards	494, UCF vs. Memphis	2017
First downs	34, UCF vs. Memphis	2018
Fewest yards allowed	306, Temple vs. Navy (138 passing, 168 rushing)	2016
Fewest rushing yards allowed	98, Houston vs. Temple	2015
Fewest passing yards allowed	17, Tulane vs. Army	2024
Individual	Record, Player, Team vs. Opponent	Year
All-purpose yards	558, McKenzie Milton, UCF vs. Memphis	2017
Touchdowns responsible for	6, McKenzie Milton, UCF vs. Memphis	2017
Rushing yards	210, Darrell Henderson, Memphis vs. UCF	2018
Rushing touchdowns	4, shared by: Darriel Mack Jr., UCF vs. Memphis; Bryson Daily, Army vs. Tulane	2018; 2024
Passing yards	494, McKenzie Milton, UCF vs. Memphis	2017
Passing touchdowns	5, McKenzie Milton, UCF vs. Memphis	2017
Receiving yards	195, Anthony Miller, Memphis vs. UCF	2017
Receiving touchdowns	3, Anthony Miller, Memphis vs. UCF	2017
Tackles	14, shared by: Curtis Akins, Memphis vs. UCF; Sam Howard, Tulane vs. Army	2018; 2024
Sacks	2, shared by: Shaquem Griffin, UCF vs. Memphis; Treyvon Reeves, Tulsa vs. Cincinnati	2017; 2020
Interceptions	1, shared by fifteen players, most recent: Andon Thomas, Army vs. Tulane	2024
Long Plays	Record, Player, Team vs. Opponent	Year
Touchdown run	82, Darrell Henderson, Memphis vs. UCF	2018
Touchdown pass	68, Anthony Miller from Riley Ferguson, Memphis vs. UCF	2017
Kickoff return	35, Rayshawn Pleasant, Tulane vs. Army	2024
Punt return	42, Otis Anderson Jr., UCF vs. Memphis	2018
Interception return	70, Ja'Von Hicks, Cincinnati vs. Memphis	2019
Fumble return	6, Justin Wright, Tulsa vs. Cincinnati	2020
Punt	63, Alex Barta, Navy vs. Temple	2016
Field goal	52, Riley Patterson, Memphis vs. Cincinnati	2019
Miscellaneous	Record, Team vs. Team	Year
Game attendance	45,176, UCF vs. Memphis	2018

== Selection criteria ==
=== Team selection ===
The two teams with the best winning percentage in conference play will play in the Championship Game. If there's a two-team tie for first place, both teams will play in the Championship Game. In the event that two teams are tied for second place, head-to head result would break the tie. If the two teams did not play, the team with higher CFP Rankings will be in the Championship game. If a team or teams lose in the final weekend of the Conference play to create a tie, and there are subsequent CFP rankings, those subsequent rankings break ties.

If regular season ends and the Championship Game is scheduled for the next Saturday, the following tiebreakers are used:

1. if one of the tied teams wins in the final week it will be in the Championship. If that team loses, a composite average of selected computer rankings are used to determine participants.
2. If both teams are ranked in the latest CFP Rankings, the higher ranked team that wins in the final weekend will be in the Championship.
3. If neither of the tied teams ranked in the latest CFP Rankings win, a composite average of selected computer rankings are used to determine participants.
4. If no teams are ranked in the latest CFP Rankings rankings, a composite average of selected computer rankings are used to determine participants.

The following procedures are used when there's a multiple team tie.

1. Conference Records of tied teams in a mini round-robin
2. The team with higher CFP Ranking; If a team or teams lose in the final weekend of the Conference season to create a tie, and there are subsequent CFP rankings, those subsequent rankings break ties.

If regular season ends and the Championship Game is scheduled for the next Saturday, the following tiebreakers are used to break multi-team ties:

1. if the highest ranked team in the latest CFP Rankings wins in the final week it will be in the Championship. If that team loses, a composite average of selected computer rankings are used to break ties.
2. If there are multiple teams ranked in the latest CFP Rankings, the higher ranked team or teams that wins will be in the Championship.
3. If neither of the tied teams are ranked in the latest CFP Rankings win, a composite average of selected computer rankings are used to break ties.
4. If no teams are ranked in the latest CFP Rankings ranked, a composite average of selected computer rankings are used to break ties.

=== Site selection ===
The team with the highest winning percentage in Conference play will host. If both participants are tied, Head-to-head is the tie breaker. If the two teams did not play, the team with the higher CFP Ranking will host. The latest CFP Rankings will be used to break ties. If a team or teams lose in the final weekend of the Conference season to create a tie, and there are subsequent CFP rankings, those subsequent rankings break ties.

If regular season ends and the Championship Game is scheduled for the next Saturday, the following tiebreakers are used:

1. if one of the tied teams wins in the final week it will host. If that team loses, a composite average of selected computer rankings will be used to determine host.
2. If both teams are ranked in the latest CFP Rankings multiple, the higher ranked team that wins in the final weekend will host.
3. If neither of the tied teams ranked in the latest CFP Rankings win, a composite average of selected computer rankings are used to determine host.
4. If no teams are ranked in the latest CFP Rankings rankings, a composite average of selected computer rankings are used to determine host.

*Note: If the number one seed is unable to host, the other team will host.

== See also ==
- List of NCAA Division I FBS conference championship games
