= Drew Svoboda =

American football player and coach

Current position
- Title: Associate head coach, Special teams coordinator, Tight ends coach
- Team: Oklahoma State
- Conference: Big 12

Biographical details
- Education: Stephen F. Austin State University (1999); Lamar University

Playing career
- 1996–1999: Stephen F. Austin
- Positions: Fullback, tight end

Coaching career (HC unless noted)
- 2000: Caney Creek HS (TX) (assistant)
- 2001–2004: Klein Collins HS (TX) (assistant)
- 2005–2007: Oak Ridge HS (TX) (assistant/OC)
- 2008–2017: Klein Collins HS (TX)
- 2018: Rice (RB)
- 2019–2020: Rice (STC/FB)
- 2021: Memphis (STC)
- 2021: Alabama (STC/TE)
- 2022: Alabama (senior special assistant to head coach)
- 2023: North Texas (associate/STC)
- 2024–2025: North Texas (associate/STC/TE)
- 2025: North Texas (interim HC)
- 2026–present: Oklahoma State (associate/STC/TE)

Head coaching record
- Overall: 99–24 (high school); 1–0 (college)
- Bowls: 1–0

Drew Svoboda is an American college football coach and former player. He is currently the associate head coach, special teams coordinator and tight ends at Oklahoma State. He was the interim head coach for the University of North Texas (UNT), serving in that position for the 2025 New Mexico Bowl following the departure of previous head coach Eric Morris for the same position at Oklahoma State. Before being elevated to interim head coach, he was associate head coach, special teams coordinator and tight ends coach at UNT, positions he held in 2024 & 2025.

== Early career ==
Svoboda played at Tomball High School in Tomball, Texas, where he lettered in football and track & field. He graduated in 1995.

He played college football at Stephen F. Austin for four seasons as a fullback and a tight end.

== Coaching career ==
=== Caney Creek HS (TX) ===
Svoboda began his coaching career as an assistant coach at Caney Creek High School in Conroe, Texas in 2000.

=== Klein Collins HS (TX) ===
From 2001 to 2004, Svoboda served as an assistant coach at Klein Collins High School in Klein, Texas.

=== Oak Ridge HS (TX) ===
From 2005 to 2007, Svoboda served as an assistant coach and offensive coordinator at Oak Ridge High School in Conroe, Texas.

=== Klein Collins HS (TX) (second stint) ===
From 2008 to 2017, Svoboda served as the head coach at Klein Collins High School.

=== Rice ===
On February 28, 2018, Svoboda was hired as the running backs coach for the Rice Owls.

=== Memphis ===
On January 8, 2021, Svoboda was hired as the special teams coordinator for the Memphis Tigers.

=== Alabama ===
On April 5, 2021, Svoboda was hired as the special teams coordinator and tight ends coach for the Alabama Crimson Tide.

In 2022, he served as senior special assistant to head coach Nick Saban as the Crimson Tide finished 11-2 and won the Sugar Bowl.

=== North Texas ===
On December 22, 2022, Svoboda was hired as the associate head coach and the special teams coordinator for the North Texas Mean Green.

In March 2024, he added leadership of the tight ends.

== Head coaching record ==
=== High school ===
Year	Team	Overall	Conference	Standing	Bowl/playoffs
Klein Collins Tigers () (2008–2017)
2008	Klein Collins	6–3	4–3	T–3rd	
2009	Klein Collins	12–1	7–0	1st	L Texas High School Football Championship Regional Round
2010	Klein Collins	11–1	7–0	1st	
2011	Klein Collins	8–3	5–2	T–2nd	
2012	Klein Collins	8–3	6–2	2nd	
2013	Klein Collins	4–6	3–5	6th	
2014	Klein Collins	11–2	6–1	2nd	
2015	Klein Collins	9–2	6–1	T–2nd	
2016	Klein Collins	13–2	7–0	1st	
2017	Klein Collins	11–1	7–0	1st	
Klein Collins:		99–24	58–14		
Total:		99–24			

=== College ===
Year	Team	Overall	Conference	Standing	Bowl/playoffs
North Texas Mean Green (American Conference) (2025)
2025	North Texas	1–0	0–0		W New Mexico
North Texas:		1–0	0–0		
Total:		1–0			
