= 2025 Tulane Green Wave football team =

American college football season

2025 Tulane Green Wave football

American champion

American Conference Championship Game, W 34–21 vs. North Texas

CFP First Round, L 10–41 at Ole Miss
- Conference: American Conference

Ranking
- Coaches: No. 18
- AP: No. 18
- Record: 11–3 (7–1 American)
- Head coach: Jon Sumrall (2nd season)
- Offensive coordinator: Joe Craddock (2nd season)
- Co-offensive coordinator: Evan McKissack (2nd season)
- Offensive scheme: West Coast
- Defensive coordinator: Greg Gasparato (2nd season)
- Co-defensive coordinator: Tayler Polk (2nd season)
- Base defense: 4–2–5
- Home stadium: Yulman Stadium

2025 American Conference football standings
	Conf.			Overall
Team	W		L	W		L
No. 18 Tulane y$^	7	–	1	11	–	3
No. 24 North Texas y	7	–	1	12	–	2
No. 23 Navy	7	–	1	11	–	2
South Florida	6	–	2	9	–	4
East Carolina	6	–	2	9	–	4
Memphis	4	–	4	8	–	5
Army	4	–	4	7	–	6
UTSA	4	–	4	7	–	6
Temple	3	–	5	5	–	7
Florida Atlantic	3	–	5	4	–	8
Rice	2	–	6	5	–	8
UAB	2	–	6	4	–	8
Tulsa	1	–	7	4	–	8
Charlotte	0	–	8	1	–	11
Championship: Tulane 34, North Texas 21
^ – College Football Playoff participant; $ – Conference champion; y – Championship game participant; Rankings from AP Poll

The 2025 Tulane Green Wave football team represented Tulane University as a member of the American Conference during the 2025 NCAA Division I FBS football season. Led by second-year head coach Jon Sumrall, the Green Wave played home games at Yulman Stadium in New Orleans.

== Schedule ==
Date	Time	Opponent	Rank	Site	TV	Result	Attendance
August 30	11:00 a.m.	Northwestern*		Yulman Stadium; New Orleans, LA	ESPNU	W 23–3	22,103
September 6	6:00 p.m.	at South Alabama*		Hancock Whitney Stadium; Mobile, AL	ESPN+	W 33–31	16,871
September 13	7:00 p.m.	Duke*		Yulman Stadium; New Orleans, LA	ESPN2	W 34–27	30,000
September 20	2:30 p.m.	at No. 13 Ole Miss*		Vaught–Hemingway Stadium; Oxford, MS (rivalry)	ESPN	L 10–45	65,644
September 27	3:00 p.m.	at Tulsa		Skelly Field at H. A. Chapman Stadium; Tulsa, OK	ESPNU	W 31–14	16,311
October 9	6:30 p.m.	East Carolina		Yulman Stadium; New Orleans, LA	ESPN	W 26–19	20,035
October 18	11:00 a.m.	Army		Yulman Stadium; New Orleans, LA	ESPNU	W 24–17	20,027
October 30	6:30 p.m.	at UTSA		Alamodome; San Antonio, TX	ESPN	L 26–48	16,715
November 7	8:00 p.m.	at Memphis		Simmons Bank Liberty Stadium; Memphis, TN	ESPN	W 38–32	30,384
November 15	3:00 p.m.	Florida Atlantic		Yulman Stadium; New Orleans, LA	ESPN+	W 35–24	30,000
November 22	2:45 p.m.	at Temple	No. 24	Lincoln Financial Field; Philadelphia, PA	ESPNU	W 37–13	13,366
November 29	6:30 p.m.	Charlotte	No. 24	Yulman Stadium; New Orleans, LA	ESPNU	W 27–0	22,245
December 5	7:00 p.m.	No. 24 North Texas	No. 20	Yulman Stadium; New Orleans, LA (American Championship Game)	ABC	W 34–21	23,986
December 20	2:30 p.m.	at (6) No. 6 Ole Miss*	(11) No. 20	Vaught–Hemingway Stadium; Oxford, MS (CFP First Round, rivalry)	TNT/HBO Max	L 10–41	68,251
*Non-conference game; Rankings from AP (and CFP Rankings, after November 4) - Released prior to game; All times are in Central time

== Rankings ==
Ranking movements Legend: ██ Increase in ranking ██ Decrease in ranking — = Not ranked RV = Received votes
	Week																
Poll	Pre	1	2	3	4	5	6	7	8	9	10	11	12	13	14	15	Final
AP	RV	RV	RV	RV	—	—	—	RV	RV	RV	—	RV	24	22	21	17	18
Coaches	RV	RV	RV	RV	RV	RV	RV	RV	RV	RV	RV	RV	25	23	21	18	18
CFP	Not released										—	—	24	24	20	20	Not released

== Game summaries ==
=== Northwestern ===
Northwestern Wildcats (0–0) at Tulane Green Wave (0–0) – Game summary

Quarter	1	2	3	4	Total
Wildcats	3	0	0	0	3
Green Wave	7	13	3	0	23

at Yulman Stadium • New Orleans, LA

- Date: August 30
- Game time: 11:00 a.m. CDT
- Game weather: Sunny • Temperature: 83 °F (28 °C) • Wind: N at 8 miles per hour (13 km/h)
- Game attendance: 22,103
- Referee: Gregory Blum
- TV announcers (ESPNU): Matt Schumacker (play-by-play) and Dustin Fox (analyst)

Game information

First quarter

- (10:27) TULN – Justyn Reid 1-yard pass from Jake Retzlaff, Patrick Durkin kick (Drive: 8 plays, 51 yards, 2:54; Tulane 7–0)
- (0:40) NU – Luke Akers 21-yard field goal (Drive: 13 plays, 69 yards, 7:35; Tulane 7–3)

Second quarter

- (11:07) TULN – Patrick Durkin 22-yard field goal (Drive: 11 plays, 77 yards, 4:28; Tulane 10–3)
- (5:18) TULN – Patrick Durkin 41-yard field goal (Drive: 11 plays, 18 yards, 5:03; Tulane 13–3)
- (1:28) TULN – Jake Retzlaff 69-yard run, Patrick Durkin kick (Drive: 2 plays, 87 yards, 0:24; Tulane 20–3)

Third quarter

- (7:22) TULN – Patrick Durkin 31-yard field goal (Drive: 16 plays, 62 yards, 7:38; Tulane 23–3)

Fourth quarter

- No scoring plays.

Statistics	NU	TULN
First downs	19	23
Plays–yards	63–237	74–421
Rushes–yards	27–76	42–269
Passing yards	161	152
Passing: comp–att–int	19–36–4	18–32–0
Turnovers	5	0
Time of possession	26:39	33:21

Team	Category	Player	Statistics
Northwestern	Passing	Preston Stone	19/36, 161 yards, 4 INT
Northwestern	Rushing	Cam Porter	6 carries, 46 yards
Northwestern	Receiving	Griffin Wilde	6 receptions, 64 yards
Tulane	Passing	Jake Retzlaff	18/31, 152 yards, TD
Tulane	Rushing	Jake Retzlaff	10 carries, 113 yards, TD
Tulane	Receiving	Omari Hayes	9 receptions, 74 yards

=== at South Alabama ===
Tulane Green Wave (1–0) at South Alabama Jaguars (1–0) – Game summary

Quarter	1	2	3	4	Total
Green Wave	14	10	3	6	33
Jaguars	14	0	0	17	31

at Hancock Whitney Stadium • Mobile, AL

- Date: September 6
- Game time: 6:00 p.m. CDT
- Game weather: Cloudy • Temperature: 84 °F (29 °C) • Wind: S at 4 miles per hour (6.4 km/h)
- Game attendance: 16,871
- Referee: Ted Pitts
- TV announcers (ESPN+): Pat Greenwood (play-by-play) and Brian Genard (analyst)

Game information

First quarter

- (10:48) USA – Bishop Davenport 9-yard run, Hamilton DiBoyan kick (Drive: 9 plays, 75 yards, 4:12; South Alabama 7–0)
- (7:11) USA – Devin Voisin 65-yard pass from Bishop Davenport, Hamilton DiBoyan kick (Drive: 3 plays, 77 yards, 1:00; South Alabama 14–0)
- (4:11) TULN – Johnny Pascuzzi 5-yard pass from Jake Retzlaff, Patrick Durkin kick (Drive: 7 plays, 55 yards, 2:52; South Alabama 14–7)
- (0:24) TULN – Zuberi Mobley 16-yard run, Patrick Durkin kick (Drive: 7 plays, 42 yards, 2:56; Tied 14–14)

Second quarter

- (6:52) TULN – Jake Retzlaff 1-yard run, Patrick Durkin kick (Drive: 11 plays, 57 yards, 5:28; Tulane 21–14)
- (0:49) TULN – Patrick Durkin 50-yard field goal (Drive: 9 plays, 53 yards, 4:14; Tulane 24–14)

Third quarter

- (8:51) TULN – Patrick Durkin 34-yard field goal (Drive: 12 plays, 61 yards, 6:02; Tulane 27–14)

Fourth quarter

- (14:57) USA – Hamilton DiBoyan 28-yard field goal (Drive: 8 plays, 40 yards, 3:20; Tulane 27–17)
- (10:01) TULN – Zuberi Mobley 28-yard run, kick failed (Drive: 10 plays, 78 yards, 4:51; Tulane 33–17)
- (5:27) USA – Kentrel Bullock 1-yard run, Bishop Davenport run (Drive: 12 plays, 75 yards, 4:34; Tulane 33–25)
- (0:59) USA – Devin Voisin 26-yard pass from Bishop Davenport, pass failed (Drive: 7 plays, 80 yards, 1:22; Tulane 33–31)

Statistics	TULN	USA
First downs	23	23
Plays–yards	72–406	65–421
Rushes–yards	45–241	41–190
Passing yards	165	231
Passing: comp–att–int	16–27–0	17–24–0
Turnovers	1	2
Time of possession	34:29	25:31

Team	Category	Player	Statistics
Tulane	Passing	Jake Retzlaff	13/24, 125 yards, TD
Tulane	Rushing	Zuberi Mobley	11 carries, 82 yards, 2 TD
Tulane	Receiving	Bryce Bohanon	5 receptions, 62 yards
South Alabama	Passing	Bishop Davenport	17/24, 231 yards, 2 TD
South Alabama	Rushing	Kentrel Bullock	24 carries, 107 yards, TD
South Alabama	Receiving	Devin Voisin	8 receptions, 152 yards, 2 TD

=== Duke ===
Duke Blue Devils (1–1) at Tulane Green Wave (2–0) – Game summary

Quarter	1	2	3	4	Total
Blue Devils	0	9	7	11	27
Green Wave	14	10	7	3	34

at Yulman Stadium • New Orleans, LA

- Date: September 13
- Game time: 7:00 p.m. CDT
- Game weather: Cloudy • Temperature: 89 °F (32 °C) • Wind: SE at 9 miles per hour (14 km/h)
- Game attendance: 30,000
- Referee: Riley Johnson
- TV announcers (ESPN2): Lowell Galindo (play-by-play), Aaron Murray (analyst) and Lauren Sisler (sideline)

Game information

First quarter

- (10:50) TULN – Jake Retzlaff 19-yard run, Patrick Durkin kick (Drive: 6 plays, 64 yards, 3:14; Tulane 7–0)
- (2:56) TULN – Jake Retzlaff 6-yard run, Patrick Durkin kick (Drive: 10 plays, 74 yards, 5:39; Tulane 14–0)

Second quarter

- (15:00) DUKE – Todd Pelino 28-yard field goal (Drive: 9 plays, 64 yards, 2:56; Tulane 14–3)
- (6:00) TULN – Jake Retzlaff 20-yard run, Patrick Durkin kick (Drive: 6 plays, 61 yards, 3:14; Tulane 21–3)
- (1:54) TULN – Patrick Durkin 29-yard field goal (Drive: 5 plays, 25 yards, 1:34; Tulane 24–3)
- (0:18) DUKE – Sahmir Hagans 29-yard pass from Darian Mensah, pass failed (Drive: 8 plays, 75 yards, 1:36; Tulane 24–9)

Third quarter

- (11:46) DUKE – Landen King 3-yard pass from Darian Mensah, Todd Pelino kick (Drive: 5 plays, 42 yards, 2:09; Tulane 24–16)
- (6:31) TULN – Jake Retzlaff 11-yard run, Patrick Durkin kick (Drive: 11 plays, 75 yards, 5:15; Tulane 31–16)

Fourth quarter

- (14:12) TULN – Patrick Durkin 27-yard field goal (Drive: 8 plays, 67 yards, 4:52; Tulane 34–16)
- (2:57) DUKE – Nate Sheppard 4-yard pass from Darian Mensah, Nate Sheppard run (Drive: 14 plays, 68 yards, 4:34; Tulane 34–24)
- (1:06) DUKE – Todd Pelino 47-yard field goal (Drive: 8 plays, 56 yards, 1:22; Tulane 34–27)

Statistics	DUKE	TULN
First downs	27	22
Plays–yards	75–452	63–426
Rushes–yards	24–139	38–156
Passing yards	313	270
Passing: comp–att–int	30–51–1	17–25–0
Turnovers	1	1
Time of possession	26:43	33:17

Team	Category	Player	Statistics
Duke	Passing	Darian Mensah	30/51, 313 yards, 3 TD, INT
Duke	Rushing	Nate Sheppard	5 carries, 75 yards
Duke	Receiving	Que'Sean Brown	6 receptions, 81 yards
Tulane	Passing	Jake Retzlaff	15/23, 245 yards
Tulane	Rushing	Jake Retzlaff	17 carries, 111 yards, 4 TD
Tulane	Receiving	Shazz Preston	3 receptions, 95 yards

=== at No. 13 Ole Miss (rivalry) ===
Tulane Green Wave (3–0) at No. 13 Ole Miss Rebels (3–0) – Game summary

Quarter	1	2	3	4	Total
Green Wave	0	3	0	7	10
No. 13 Rebels	10	13	0	22	45

at Vaught–Hemingway Stadium • Oxford, MS

- Date: September 20
- Game time: 2:30 p.m. CDT
- Game weather: Sunny • Temperature: 89 °F (32 °C) • Wind: W at 7 miles per hour (11 km/h)
- Game attendance: 65,644
- Referee: Steve Marlowe
- TV announcers (ESPN): Mark Jones (play-by-play), Roddy Jones (analyst) and Quint Kessenich (sideline)

Game information

First quarter

- (12:23) MISS – Dae'Quan Wright 5-yard pass from Trinidad Chambliss, Lucas Carneiro kick (Drive: 8 plays, 75 yards, 2:37; Ole Miss 7–0)
- (3:13) MISS – Lucas Carneiro 22-yard field goal (Drive: 15 plays, 70 yards, 6:40; Ole Miss 10–0)

Second quarter

- (12:48) MISS – Lucas Carneiro 54-yard field goal (Drive: 7 plays, 34 yards, 2:24; Ole Miss 13–0)
- (6:40) TULN – Patrick Durkin 34-yard field goal (Drive: 11 plays, 59 yards, 6:08; Ole Miss 13–3)
- (4:09) MISS – Kewan Lacy 1-yard run, Lucas Carneiro kick (Drive: 6 plays, 72 yards, 2:31; Ole Miss 20–3)
- (0:24) MISS – Lucas Carneiro 33-yard field goal (Drive: 8 plays, 62 yards, 1:26; Ole Miss 23–3)

Third quarter

- No scoring plays

Fourth quarter

- (14:55) MISS – Kewan Lacy 1-yard run, Harrison Wallace III pass (Drive: 6 plays, 60 yards, 2:44; Ole Miss 31–3)
- (11:45) MISS – Logan Diggs 2-yard run, Lucas Carneiro kick (Drive: 2 plays, 55 yards, 0:36; Ole Miss 38–3)
- (8:17) MISS – Deuce Alexander 33-yard pass from Trinidad Chambliss, Lucas Carneiro kick (Drive: 8 plays, 72 yards, 2:31; Ole Miss 45–3)
- (3:42) TULN – Anthony Brown-Stephens 6-yard pass from Brendan Sullivan, Patrick Durkin kick (Drive: 11 plays, 65 yards, 4:35; Ole Miss 45–10)

Statistics	TULN	MISS
First downs	18	23
Plays–yards	68–282	69–548
Rushes–yards	39–178	42–241
Passing yards	104	307
Passing: comp–att–int	10–29–1	17–27–0
Turnovers	1	1
Time of possession	32:29	27:31

Team	Category	Player	Statistics
Tulane	Passing	Jake Retzlaff	5/17, 56 yards
Tulane	Rushing	Jake Retzlaff	8 carries, 51 yards
Tulane	Receiving	Shazz Preston	3 receptions, 35 yards
Ole Miss	Passing	Trinidad Chambliss	17/27, 307 yards, 2 TD
Ole Miss	Rushing	Trinidad Chambliss	14 carries, 112 yards
Ole Miss	Receiving	Deuce Alexander	4 receptions, 94 yards, TD

=== at Tulsa ===
Tulane Green Wave (3–1) at Tulsa Golden Hurricane (2–2) – Game summary

Quarter	1	2	3	4	Total
Green Wave	7	17	7	0	31
Golden Hurricane	7	7	0	0	14

at Skelly Field • Tulsa, OK

- Date: September 27
- Game time: 3:00 p.m. CDT
- Game weather: Sunny • Temperature: 85 °F (29 °C) • Wind: NE at 5 miles per hour (8.0 km/h)
- Game attendance: 16,311
- Referee: Steve Anderson
- TV announcers (ESPNU): Chuckie Kempf (play-by-play) and Darius Walker (analyst)

Game information

First quarter

- (11:28) TULN – Jake Retzlaff 8-yard run, Patrick Durkin kick (Drive: 7 plays, 75 yards, 3:32; Tulane 7–0)
- (9:14) TLSA – Tim Hardiman 1-yard run, Seth Morgan kick (Drive: 7 plays, 75 yards, 2:14; Tied 7–7)

Second quarter

- (12:10) TULN – Javin Gordon 12-yard run, Patrick Durkin kick (Drive: 7 plays, 55 yards, 3:11; Tulane 14–7)
- (6:57) TLSA – Brody Foley 72-yard pass from Baylor Hayes, Seth Morgan kick (Drive: 5 plays, 93 yards, 2:34; Tied 14–14)
- (2:13) TULN – Javin Gordon 25-yard run, Patrick Durkin kick (Drive: 6 plays, 61 yards, 2:36; Tulane 21–14)
- (0:12) TULN – Patrick Durkin 28-yard field goal (Drive: 6 plays, 54 yards, 0:42; Tulane 24–14)

Third quarter

- (5:28) TULN – Javin Gordon 4-yard run, Patrick Durkin kick (Drive: 13 plays, 69 yards, 5:40; Tulane 31–14)

Fourth quarter

- No scoring plays.

Statistics	TULN	TLSA
First downs	23	16
Plays–yards	75–437	74–337
Rushes–yards	43–185	38–92
Passing yards	252	245
Passing: comp–att–int	18–32–0	18–36–1
Turnovers	1	2
Time of possession	34:59	25:01

Team	Category	Player	Statistics
Tulane	Passing	Jake Retzlaff	17/30, 242 yards
Tulane	Rushing	Javin Gordon	15 carries, 78 yards, 3 TD
Tulane	Receiving	Omari Hayes	4 receptions, 89 yards
Tulsa	Passing	Baylor Hayes	18/36, 245 yards, TD, INT
Tulsa	Rushing	Dominic Richardson	14 carries, 48 yards
Tulsa	Receiving	Grayson Tempest	2 receptions, 84 yards

=== East Carolina ===
East Carolina Pirates (3–2) at Tulane Green Wave (4–1) – Game summary

Quarter	1	2	3	4	Total
Pirates	0	0	16	3	19
Green Wave	3	9	0	14	26

at Yulman Stadium • New Orleans, LA

- Date: October 9
- Game time: 6:30 p.m. CDT
- Game weather: Sunny • Temperature: 85 °F (29 °C) • Wind: NE at 8 miles per hour (13 km/h)
- Game attendance: 20,035
- Referee: Edwin Lee
- TV announcers (ESPN): Matt Barrie (play-by-play), Tom Luginbill (analyst) and Harry Lyles Jr. (sideline)

Game information

First quarter

- (10:40) TULN – Patrick Durkin 30-yard field goal (Drive: 8 plays, 28 yards, 2:30; Tulane 3–0)

Second quarter

- (13:37) TULN – Patrick Durkin 29-yard field goal (Drive: 9 plays, 59 yards, 4:52; Tulane 6–0)
- (5:05) TULN – Patrick Durkin 21-yard field goal (Drive: 10 plays, 57 yards, 5:45; Tulane 9–0)
- (0:36) TULN – Patrick Durkin 40-yard field goal (Drive: 8 plays, 41 yards, 1:32; Tulane 12–0)

Third quarter

- (11:54) ECU – Brock Spalding 7-yard pass from Katin Houser, Nick Mazzie kick (Drive: 6 plays, 70 yards, 1:55; Tulane 12–7)
- (2:43) ECU – Katin Houser 10-yard run (Drive: 15 plays, 57 yards, 6:03; East Carolina 13–12)
- (0:45) ECU – Nick Mazzie 46-yard field goal (Drive: 4 plays, 3 yards, 1:57; East Carolina 16–12)

Fourth quarter

- (10:51) TULN – Zycarl Lewis Jr. 63-yard pass from Jake Retzlaff, Patrick Durkin kick (Drive: 1 play, 63 yards, 0:10; Tulane 19–16)
- (5:48) ECU – Nick Mazzie 26-yard field goal (Drive: 13 plays, 67 yards, 5:03; Tied 19–19)
- (0:35) TULN – Javin Gordon 4-yard pass from Jake Retzlaff, Patrick Durkin kick (Drive: 12 plays, 75 yards, 5:13; Tulane 26–19)

Statistics	ECU	TULN
First downs	22	24
Plays–yards	73–340	62–458
Rushes–yards	43–160	25–96
Passing yards	180	362
Passing: comp–att–int	19–30–0	27–37–0
Turnovers	0	1
Time of possession	30:37	29:23

Team	Category	Player	Statistics
East Carolina	Passing	Katin Houser	19/30, 180 yards, TD
East Carolina	Rushing	Marlon Gunn Jr.	10 carries, 52 yards
East Carolina	Receiving	Anthony Smith	2 receptions, 54 yards
Tulane	Passing	Jake Retzlaff	26/36, 347 yards, 2 TD
Tulane	Rushing	Javin Gordon	10 carries, 34 yards
Tulane	Receiving	Zycarl Lewis Jr.	2 receptions, 75 yards, TD

=== Army ===
Army Black Knights (3–3) at Tulane Green Wave (5–1) – Game summary

Quarter	1	2	3	4	Total
Black Knights	0	3	7	7	17
Green Wave	0	3	7	14	24

at Yulman Stadium • New Orleans, LA

- Date: October 18
- Game time: 11:00 a.m. CDT
- Game weather: Sunny • Temperature: 84 °F (29 °C) • Wind: SE at 11 miles per hour (18 km/h)
- Game attendance: 20,027
- Referee: Charles Lamertina
- TV announcers (ESPNU): Courtney Lyle (play-by-play) and Rene Ingoglia (analyst)

Game information

First quarter

- No scoring plays.

Second quarter

- (1:49) TULN – Patrick Durkin 30-yard field goal (Drive: 15 plays, 75 yards, 5:42; Tulane 3–0)
- (0:23) ARMY – Dawson Jones 43-yard field goal (Drive: 6 plays, 49 yards, 1:26; Tied 3–3)

Third quarter

- (6:31) ARMY – Cale Hellums 1-yard run, Dawson Jones kick (Drive: 13 plays, 80 yards, 7:16; Army 10–3)
- (4:52) TULN – Jake Retzlaff 37-yard run, Patrick Durkin kick (Drive: 4 plays, 58 yards, 1:30; Tied 10–10)

Fourth quarter

- (5:54) ARMY – Cale Hellums 1-yard run, Dawson Jones kick (Drive: 14 plays, 80 yards, 8:16; Army 17–10)
- (1:54) TULN – Bryce Bohanon 12-yard pass from Jake Retzlaff, Patrick Durkin kick (Drive: 11 plays, 75 yards, 4:00; Tied 17–17)
- (0:27) TULN – Shazz Preston 26-yard pass from Jake Retzlaff, Patrick Durkin kick (Drive: 6 plays, 75 yards, 1:01; Tulane 24–17)

Statistics	ARMY	TULN
First downs	21	23
Plays–yards	73–358	58–402
Rushes–yards	63–233	29–141
Passing yards	125	261
Passing: comp–att–int	7–10–0	22–29–1
Turnovers	0	1
Time of possession	38:58	21:02

Team	Category	Player	Statistics
Army	Passing	Cale Hellums	7/10, 125 yards
Army	Rushing	Cale Hellums	38 carries, 163 yards, 2 TD
Army	Receiving	Brady Anderson	4 receptions, 97 yards
Tulane	Passing	Jake Retzlaff	22/29, 261 yards, 2 TD, INT
Tulane	Rushing	Jake Retzlaff	8 carries, 62 yards, TD
Tulane	Receiving	Shazz Preston	5 receptions, 86 yards, TD

=== at UTSA ===
Tulane Green Wave (6–1) at UTSA Roadrunners (3–4) – Game summary

Quarter	1	2	3	4	Total
Green Wave	6	6	7	7	26
Roadrunners	10	21	7	10	48

at Alamodome • San Antonio, TX

- Date: October 30
- Game time: 6:30 PM CDT
- Game weather: Indoor
- Game attendance: 16,715
- Referee: Kevin Randall
- TV announcers (ESPN): Matt Barrie (play-by-play), Tom Luginbill (analyst), and Harry Lyles Jr. (sideline)

Game information

First quarter

- (11:37) TULN – Jake Retzlaff 1-yard run (Drive: 7 plays, 75 yards, 3:23; Tulane 6–0)
- (9:50) UTSA – David Amador II 2-yard pass from Owen McCown, Michael Petro kick (Drive: 5 plays, 75 yards, 1:47; UTSA 7–6)
- (5:06) UTSA – Michael Petro 34-yard field goal (Drive: 6 plays, 27 yards, 3:23; UTSA 10–6)

Second quarter

- (12:10) UTSA – Devin McCuin 6-yard pass from Owen McCown, Michael Petro kick (Drive: 8 plays, 61 yards, 3:43; UTSA 17–6)
- (3:37) UTSA – Devin McCuin 21-yard pass from Owen McCown, Michael Petro kick (Drive: 4 plays, 62 yards, 2:15; UTSA 24–6)
- (0:45) UTSA – David Amador II 14-yard pass from Owen McCown, Michael Petro kick (Drive: 7 plays, 71 yards, 2:11; UTSA 31–6)
- (0:07) TULN – Zycarl Lewis Jr. 10-yard pass from Jake Retzlaff (Drive: 6 plays, 68 yards, 0:33; UTSA 31–12)

Third quarter

- (10:08) UTSA – Will Henderson III 16-yard pass from Owen McCown, Michael Petro kick (Drive: 8 plays, 75 yards, 4:52; UTSA 38–12)
- (3:26) TULN – Omari Hayes 42-yard pass from Jimmy Calloway, Patrick Durkin kick (Drive: 5 plays, 72 yards, 2:27; UTSA 38–19)

Fourth quarter

- (14:44) UTSA – Michael Petro 43-yard feild goal (Drive: 8 plays, 37 yards, 3:41; UTSA 41–19)
- (7:10) TULN – Tre Shackelford 15-yard pass from Brendan Sullivan, Patrick Durkin kick (Drive: 4 plays, 93 yards, 1:34; UTSA 41–26)
- (1:40) UTSA – Will Henderson III 17-yard pass from Owen McCown, Michael Petro kick (Drive: 10 plays, 75 yards, 5:30; UTSA 48–26)

Statistics	TULN	UTSA
First downs	24	28
Plays–yards	61–434	69–523
Rushes–yards	25–135	35–132
Passing yards	299	391
Passing: comp–att–int	21–36–3	32–34–0
Turnovers	4	0
Time of possession	23:05	36:55

Team	Category	Player	Statistics
Tulane	Passing	Jake Retzlaff	14/28, 194 yards, TD, 2 INT
Tulane	Rushing	Jake Retzlaff	7 carries, 63 yards, TD
Tulane	Receiving	Omari Hayes	3 receptions, 69 yards, TD
UTSA	Passing	Owen McCown	31/33, 370 yards, 4 TD
UTSA	Rushing	Robert Henry	16 carries, 87 yards
UTSA	Receiving	David Amador II	10 receptions, 113 yards, 2 TD

=== at Memphis ===
Tulane Green Wave (6-2) at Memphis Tigers (8–1) – Game summary

Quarter	1	2	3	4	Total
Green Wave	14	21	3	0	38
Tigers	7	10	0	15	32

at Simmons Bank Liberty Stadium • Memphis, TN

- Date: November 7
- Game time: 8:00 PM CST
- Game weather: Cloudy • Temperature: 64 °F (18 °C) • Wind: S at 3 miles per hour (4.8 km/h)
- Game attendance: 30,384
- Referee: Tim Rich
- TV announcers (ESPN): Anish Shroff (play-by-play), Andre Ware (analyst), and Paul Carcaterra (sideline)

Game information

First quarter

- (12:33) TULN – Shazz Preston 65-yard pass from Jake Retzlaff, Patrick Durkin kick (Drive: 1 play, 65 yards, 0:09; Tulane 7–0)
- (10:38) MEM – Jamari Hawkins 55-yard pass from Brendon Lewis, Gianni Spetic kick (Drive: 5 plays, 75 yards, 1:55; Tied 7–7)
- (4:58) TULN – Javin Gordon 5-yard run, Patrick Durkin kick (Drive: 10 plays, 75 yards, 5:40; Tulane 14–7)

Second quarter

- (14:55) MEM – Arrington Maiden 21-yard run, Gianni Spetic kick (Drive: 5 plays, 66 yards, 1:51; Tied 14–14)
- (12:02) TULN – Jake Retzlaff 33-yard run, Patrick Durkin kick (Drive: 6 plays, 75 yards, 2:53; Tulane 21–14)
- (9:26) TULN – Anthony Brown-Stephens 54-yard pass from Jake Retzlaff, Patrick Durkin kick (Drive: 3 plays, 65 yards, 1:19; Tulane 28–14)
- (4:27) MEM – Gianni Spetic 49-yard field goal (Drive: 10 plays, 44 yards, 4:59; Tulane 28–17)
- (0:43) TULN – Shazz Preston 5-yard pass from Jake Retzlaff, Patrick Durkin kick (Drive: 10 plays, 75 yards, 3:44; Tulane 35–17)

Third quarter

- (11:51) TULN – Patrick Durkin 30-yard field goal (Drive: 6 plays, 63 yards, 3:09; Tulane 38–17)

Fourth quarter

- (14:57) MEM – Frank Peasant 1-yard run, Matt Adcock pass (Drive: 12 plays, 77 yards, 6:44; Tulane 38–25)
- (7:49) MEM – Brady Kluse 25-yard pass from Brendon Lewis, Gianni Spetic kick (Drive: 10 plays, 81 yards, 6:04; Tulane 38–32)

Statistics	TULN	MEM
First downs	17	23
Plays–yards	56–457	69–435
Rushes–yards	32–125	29–67
Passing yards	332	368
Passing: comp–att–int	16–24–0	33–40–1
Turnovers	0	1
Time of possession	25:32	34:28

Team	Category	Player	Statistics
Tulane	Passing	Jake Retzlaff	16/23, 332 yards, 3 TD
Tulane	Rushing	Javin Gordon	12 carries, 66 yards, TD
Tulane	Receiving	Bryce Bohanon	4 receptions, 101 yards
Memphis	Passing	Brendon Lewis	29/34, 317 yards, 2 TD, INT
Memphis	Rushing	Greg Desrosiers Jr.	8 carries, 35 yards
Memphis	Receiving	Cortez Braham Jr.	11 receptions, 113 yards

=== Florida Atlantic ===
Florida Atlantic Owls (4–5) at Tulane Green Wave (7–2) – Game summary

Quarter	1	2	3	4	Total
Owls	3	7	0	14	24
Green Wave	7	14	7	7	35

at Yulman Stadium • New Orleans, LA

- Date: November 15
- Game time: 3:00 p.m. CDT
- Game attendance: 30,000
- Referee: Reid Jackson
- TV announcers (ESPN+): Jack Benjamin (play-by-play), Barrett Brooks (analyst) and Smacker Miles (sideline)

Game information

First quarter

- TLN – Jimmy Calloway 14-yard run (Patrick Durkin kick), 6:38. Green Wave 7–0. Drive: 1 play, 14 yards, 0:06.
- FAU – Garrison Smith 25-yard field goal, 2:06. Green Wave 7–3. Drive: 7 plays, 68 yards, 4:32.

Second quarter

- TLN – Bryce Bohanon 29-yard pass from Jake Retzlaff (Patrick Durkin kick), 14:54. Green Wave 14–3. Drive: 6 plays, 80 yards, 1:59.
- FAU – Jayshon Platt 4-yard pass from Caden Veltkamp (Garrison Smith kick), 11:06. Green Wave 14–10. Drive: 11 plays, 75 yards, 3:48.
- TLN – Anthony Miller 14-yard pass from Jake Retzlaff (Patrick Durkin kick), 7:08. Green Wave 21–10. Drive: 8 plays, 75 yards, 3:58.

Third quarter

- TLN – Jamauri McClure 8-yard run (Patrick Durkin kick), 1:00. Green Wave 28–10. Drive: 5 plays, 51 yards, 2:28.

Fourth quarter

- FAU – Kaden Shields-Dutton 1-yard run (pass failed), 11:09. Green Wave 28–16. Drive: 17 plays, 75 yards, 4:51.
- TLN – Jake Retzlaff 1-yard run (Patrick Durkin kick), 4:30. Green Wave 35–16. Drive: 13 plays, 67 yards, 6:33.
- FAU – Easton Messer 12-yard pass from Caden Veltkamp (Caden Veltkamp–Asaad Waseem pass), 1:49. Green Wave 35–24. Drive: 9 plays, 75 yards, 2:41.

Statistics	FAU	TULN
First downs	32	21
Plays–yards	86–472	64–403
Rushes–yards	29–97	37–162
Passing yards	375	241
Passing: comp–att–int	39–57–3	18–27–1
Turnovers	4	1
Time of possession	30:20	29:40

Team	Category	Player	Statistics
Florida Atlantic	Passing	Caden Veltkamp	39/57, 375 yards, 2 TD, 3 INT
Florida Atlantic	Rushing	Kaden Shields-Dutton	10 carries, 54 yards, TD
Florida Atlantic	Receiving	Easton Messer	9 receptions, 133 yards, TD
Tulane	Passing	Jake Retzlaff	18/27, 241 yards, 2 TD, INT
Tulane	Rushing	Jamauri McClure	10 carries, 94 yards, TD
Tulane	Receiving	Bryce Bohanon	3 receptions, 56 yards, TD

=== at Temple ===
No. 24 Tulane Green Wave (8–2) at Temple Owls (5–5) – Game summary

Quarter	1	2	3	4	Total
No. 24 Green Wave	10	10	6	11	37
Owls	7	0	0	6	13

at Lincoln Financial Field • Philadelphia, PA

- Date: November 22
- Game time: 2:45 pm CST
- Game weather: Cloudy, 52F, Wind NNW at 8 MPH
- Game attendance: 13,366
- Referee: Charles Lamertina
- TV announcers (ESPNU): Chuckie Kempf (play-by-play) and Darius Walker (analyst)

Game information

First quarter

- TLN – Shazz Preston 69-yard pass from Jake Retzlaff (Patrick Durkin kick), 12:33. Green Wave 7–0. Drive: 2 plays, 72 yards, 0:36.
- TLN – Patrick Durkin 50-yard field goal, 4:30. Green Wave 10–0. Drive: 11 plays, 52 yards, 4:11.
- TEM – Peter Clarke 3-yard pass from Evan Simon (Carl Hardin kick), 0:27. Green Wave 10–7. Drive: 8 plays, 75 yards, 4:03.

Second quarter

- TLN – Jake Retzlaff 2-yard run (Patrick Durkin kick), 6:36. Green Wave 17–7. Drive: 5 plays, 46 yards, 2:59.
- TLN – Patrick Durkin 36-yard field goal, 0:21. Green Wave 20–7. Drive: 9 plays, 46 yards, 2:01.

Third quarter

- TLN – Patrick Durkin 38-yard field goal, 9:05. Green Wave 23–7. Drive: 12 plays, 45 yards, 5:55.
- TLN – Patrick Durkin 42-yard field goal, 0:53. Green Wave 26–7. Drive: 11 plays, 52 yards, 5:12.

Fourth quarter

- TEM – Colin Chase 2-yard pass from Evan Simon (pass failed), 12:56. Green Wave 26–13. Drive: 9 plays, 75 yards, 2:57.
- TLN – Justyn Reid 4-yard pass from Jake Retzlaff (Jake Retzlaff–Anthony Brown-Stephens pass), 9:55. Green Wave 34–13. Drive: 5 plays, 38 yards, 2:51.
- TLN – Patrick Durkin 52-yard field goal, 6:58. Green Wave 37–13. Drive: 5 plays, 21 yards, 1:28.

Statistics	TULN	TEM
First downs	22	14
Plays–yards	68–406	57–204
Rushes–yards	39–175	20–20
Passing yards	231	184
Passing: comp–att–int	17–29–0	24–37–0
Turnovers	0	1
Time of possession	34:21	25:39

Team	Category	Player	Statistics
Tulane	Passing	Jake Retzlaff	17/28, 231 yards, 2 TD
Tulane	Rushing	Jamauri McClure	17 carries, 122 yards
Tulane	Receiving	Shazz Preston	5 receptions, 96 yards, TD
Temple	Passing	Evan Simon	21/32, 168 yards, 2 TD
Temple	Rushing	Jay Ducker	7 carries, 17 yards
Temple	Receiving	Colin Chase	5 receptions, 59 yards, TD

=== Charlotte ===
Charlotte 49ers (1–10) at No. 24 Tulane Green Wave (9–2) – Game summary

Quarter	1	2	3	4	Total
49ers	0	0	0	0	0
No. 24 Green Wave	14	7	0	6	27

at Yulman Stadium • New Orleans, LA

- Date: November 29
- Game time: 6:30 p.m. CST
- Game weather: Cloudy • Temperature: 64 °F (18 °C) • Wind: SE at 9 miles per hour (14 km/h)
- Game attendance: 22,245
- Referee: Reid Jackson
- TV announcers (ESPNU): Chuckie Kempf (play-by-play) and Darius Walker (analyst)

Game information

First quarter

- (12:34) TULN – Javin Gordon 1-yard run, Patrick Durkin kick (Drive: 7 plays, 65 yards, 2:26; Tulane 7–0)
- (6:13) TULN – Jake Retzlaff 1-yard run, Patrick Durkin kick (Drive: 9 plays, 72 yards, 4:43; Tulane 14–0)

Second quarter

- (1:09) TULN – Jake Retzlaff 1-yard run, Patrick Durkin kick (Drive: 6 plays, 33 yards, 2:14; Tulane 21–0)

Third quarter

- No scoring plays.

Fourth quarter

- (13:54) TULN – Patrick Durkin 36-yard field goal (Drive: 11 plays, 71 yards, 4:48; Tulane 24–0)
- (5:51) TULN – Patrick Durkin 52-yard field goal (Drive: 7 plays, 35 yards, 2:31; Tulane 27–0)

Statistics	CLT	TULN
First downs	7	25
Plays–yards	49–140	74–463
Rushes–yards	21–(-3)	35–151
Passing yards	143	312
Passing: comp–att–int	20–28–2	29–39–2
Turnovers	2	3
Time of possession	25:44	34:16

Team	Category	Player	Statistics
Charlotte	Passing	Grayson Loftis	18/25, 140 yards, INT
Charlotte	Rushing	Cameren Smith	6 carries, 24 yards
Charlotte	Receiving	Sean Brown	5 receptions, 49 yards
Tulane	Passing	Jake Retzlaff	28/38, 291 yards, 2 INT
Tulane	Rushing	Jamauri McClure	11 carries, 69 yards
Tulane	Receiving	Anthony Brown-Stephens	9 receptions, 98 yards

=== No. 24 North Texas (American Conference Championship Game) ===
2025 American Conference Championship Game
No. 24 North Texas Mean Green (11–1) at No. 20 Tulane Green Wave (10–2) – Game summary

Quarter	1	2	3	4	Total
No. 24 Mean Green	7	0	6	8	21
No. 20 Green Wave	7	17	7	3	34

at Yulman Stadium • New Orleans, LA

- Date: December 5
- Game time: 7:00 p.m. CST
- Game weather: Overcast • Temperature: 52 °F (11 °C) • Wind: NNW at 6 miles per hour (9.7 km/h)
- Game attendance: 23,986
- Referee: Kevin Randall
- TV announcers (ABC): Mark Jones (play-by-play), Roddy Jones (analyst) and Quint Kessenich (sideline)

Game information

First quarter

- UNT – Tre Williams III 10-yard pass from Drew Mestemaker (Kali Nguma kick), 8:32. Mean Green 7–0. Drive: 15 plays, 75 yards, 6:28.
- TULN – Jake Retzlaff 2-yard run (Patrick Durkin kick), 0:30. Tied 7–7. Drive: 16 plays, 81 yards, 7:57.

Second quarter

- TULN – Jamauri McClure 7-yard run (Patrick Durkin kick), 12:29. Green Wave 14–7. Drive: 2 plays, 37 yards, 0:55.
- TULN – Patrick Durkin 30-yard field goal, 5:46. Green Wave 17–7. Drive: 10 plays, 46 yards, 4:39.
- TULN – Jake Retzlaff 1-yard run (Patrick Durkin kick), 0:03. Green Wave 24–7. Drive: 6 plays, 13 yards, 0:47.

Third quarter

- TULN – Chris Rodgers 35-yard interception return (Patrick Durkin kick), 7:32. Green Wave 31–7.
- UNT – Miles Coleman 59-yard pass from Drew Mestemaker (pass failed), 0:16. Green Wave 31–13. Drive: 4 plays, 60 yards, 1:03.

Fourth quarter

- UNT – Ashton Gray 9-yard run (Ashton Gray run), 9:26. Green Wave 31–21. Drive: 8 plays, 88 yards, 2:54.
- TULN – Patrick Durkin 30-yard field goal, 2:51. Green Wave 34–21. Drive: 12 plays, 66 yards, 6:29.

Statistics	UNT	TULN
First downs	25	22
Plays–yards	68–415	74–344
Rushes–yards	34–121	52–199
Passing yards	294	145
Passing: comp–att–int	21–34–3	13–22–0
Turnovers	5	0
Time of possession	24:52	35:08

Team	Category	Player	Statistics
North Texas	Passing	Drew Mestemaker	21/34, 294 yards, 2 TD, 3 INT
North Texas	Rushing	Ashton Gray	8 carries, 47 yards, TD
North Texas	Receiving	Miles Coleman	7 receptions, 125 yards, TD
Tulane	Passing	Jake Retzlaff	13/22, 145 yards
Tulane	Rushing	Jamauri McClure	22 carries, 121 yards, TD
Tulane	Receiving	Garrett Mmahat	3 receptions, 39 yards

=== at No. 6 Ole Miss (College Football Playoff - First Round) ===
CFP First Round Game - No. 11 Tulane Green Wave (11–2) at No. 6 Ole Miss Rebels (11-1) – Game summary

Quarter	1	2	3	4	Total
No. 11 Green Wave	0	3	0	7	10
No. 6 Rebels	14	3	10	14	41

at Vaught-Hemingway Stadium • Oxford, MS

- Date: December 20
- Game time: 2:30 pm CST
- Game weather: Sunny • Temperature: 65 °F (18 °C) • Wind: S at 9 miles per hour (14 km/h)
- Game attendance: 68,251
- Referee: Adam Savoie
- TV announcers (TNT): Joe Tessitore (play-by-play), Jesse Palmer (analyst), Katie George and Quint Kessenich (sideline reporters)

Game information

First quarter

- MISS – Kewan Lacy 20-yard run (Lucas Carneiro kick), 14:01. Rebels 7–0. Drive: 3 plays, 75 yards, 0:59.
- MISS – Trinidad Chambliss 4-yard run (Lucas Carneiro kick), 7:26. Rebels 14–0. Drive: 4 plays, 60 yards, 1:21.

Second quarter

- TULN – Patrick Durkin 39-yard field goal, 14:06. Rebels 14–3. Drive: 5 plays, 61 yards, 1:59.
- MISS – Lucas Carneiro 42-yard field goal, 3:38. Rebels 17–3. Drive: 11 plays, 62 yards, 4:40.

Third quarter

- MISS – De'Zhaun Stribling 13-yard pass from Trinidad Chambliss (Lucas Carneiro kick), 10:13. Rebels 24–3. Drive: 7 plays, 80 yards, 2:51.
- MISS – Lucas Carneiro 48-yard field goal, 4:57. Rebels 27–3. Drive: 6 plays, 16 yards, 1:47.

Fourth quarter

- MISS – Logan Diggs 3-yard run (Lucas Carneiro kick), 14:55. Rebels 34–3. Drive: 8 plays, 52 yards, 3:07.
- MISS – Trinidad Chambliss 8-yard run (Lucas Carneiro kick), 10:45. Rebels 41–3. Drive: 5 plays, 29 yards, 2:37.
- TULN – Justyn Reid 29-yard pass from Jake Retzlaff (Patrick Durkin kick), 4:00. Rebels 41–10. Drive: 4 plays, 80 yards, 2:03.

Statistics	TULN	MISS
First downs	20	30
Plays–yards	71–421	68–497
Rushes–yards	34–115	34–151
Passing yards	306	346
Passing: comp–att–int	20–37–1	27–34–0
Turnovers	3	1
Time of possession	31:01	28:30

Team	Category	Player	Statistics
Tulane	Passing	Jake Retzlaff	20/35, 306 yards, TD, INT
Tulane	Rushing	Jamauri McClure	15 carries, 84 yards
Tulane	Receiving	Shazz Preston	5 receptions, 125 yards
Ole Miss	Passing	Trinidad Chambliss	23/29, 282 yards, TD
Ole Miss	Rushing	Kewan Lacy	15 carries, 87 yards, TD
Ole Miss	Receiving	Deuce Alexander	7 receptions, 87 yards

== Personnel ==
=== Roster ===
2025 Tulane Green Wave football team roster
Players
Coaches
Offense

Pos.	#	Name	Class
RB	0	Maurice Turner	Jr
WR	1	Omari Hayes	So
RB	2	Zuberi Mobley	Sr
QB	3	Kadin Semonza	So
WR	4	Jimmy Calloway	Sr
WR	5	Anthony Brown-Stephens	Jr
QB	6	Brendan Sullivan	Sr
WR	7	Shazz Preston	Jr
QB	8	Kellen Tasby	Fr
TE	9	LeRon Husbands	Jr
QB	10	Donovan Leary	Jr
WR	11	Tre Shackelford	Sr
QB	12	Cade Scott	Fr
QB	12	Jake Retzlaff	Sr
TE	13	Ty Thompson	Sr
QB	14	Dagan Bruno	Fr
WR	15	Zycarl Lewis Jr.	Fr
QB	16	Garrett Mmahat	Jr
QB	17	Jay Beamon	Fr
WR	19	Shaun Nicholas	So
RB	20	Arnold Barnes III	Jr
QB	22	Jakson Judge	So
RB	23	Javin Gordon	Fr
RB	25	Jamauri McClure	Fr
WR	26	Walker Davis	Fr
WR	28	Seth Gale	Fr
WR	37	Cash Semonza	Fr
WR	39	John Barton	Fr
RB	43	Gabe Mocek	Fr
OL	50	Jordan Hall	Sr
OL	51	John Bock II	Sr
OL	52	Tristen Fortenberry	Fr
OL	55	Dominic Steward	Fr
OL	56	Shadre Hurst	Jr
OL	58	Jack Hollifield	Sr
OL	60	Jaxon Ducre	Fr
OL	61	Leo Wulffraat	Fr
OL	66	Gresham Perry	Fr
OL	68	Robbie Pizzolato	Jr
OL	70	Juelz Baptiste	Fr
OL	71	Jayce Mitchell	Fr
OL	72	Mitch Hodnett	Fr
OL	73	Elijah Baker	Fr
OL	74	Landry Cannon	So
OL	75	Colin O'Carroll	Fr
OL	76	Derrick Graham	Sr
OL	77	Darion Reed	So
OL	78	Reese Baker	Fr
OL	79	Ananias Harris	So
WR	80	Oliver Mitchell Jr.	Fr
WR	81	Erik Urbaniak	Fr
TE	82	Johnny Pascuzzi	Sr
WR	83	Bryce Bohanon	Sr
WR	84	Antwaun Parham	Fr
TE	85	Anthony Miller	So
TE	86	Gabe Lovorn	Fr
TE	87	Cameron Roberts	Fr
TE	88	Justyn Reid	Jr
TE	89	DJ Cicero	Fr

Defense

Pos.	#	Name	Class
BAN	0	Mo Westmoreland	Sr
S	1	Jack Tchienchou	So
LB	2	Dickson Agu	So
SPR	3	Javion White	So
LB	4	Chris Rodgers	Jr
BAN	5	Harvey Dyson	Jr
DE	6	Kameron Hamilton	Sr
S	7	Kevin Adams III	So
DB	8	Isaiah Wadsworth	Sr
BAN	9	Jordan Norman	So
DE	10	Gerrod Henderson	Jr
DB	11	E'zaiah Shine	Fr
DB	12	KC Eziomume	Sr
SPEAR	13	Tavare Smith	Jr
DB	14	Armani Cargo	Fr
LB	15	Sam Howard	Sr
LB	17	Dallas Winner-Johnson	So
DB	20	Jahiem Johnson	So
DB	21	Jayden Lewis	So
CB	22	LJ Green	So
CB	23	Josh Sims	Fr
SPR	24	Michael Igbinoghene	Fr
DB	26	Dorion Jackson	So
S	27	Chase Green	Fr
DL	29	Santana Hopper	Jr
S	30	Joshua Moore	So
S	31	Carson Klein	Fr
S	32	Bailey Despanie	Sr
DB	33	Rodrek Williams II	Sr
LB	37	Harold Lawson	So
BAN	40	Warren Roberts Jr.	Fr
LB	42	Makai Williams	Jr
LB	43	Grayson McPherson	Fr
LB	44	Jean Claude Joseph III	So
BAN	45	Joshua Brantley	Fr
BAN	47	Michael Guruli	So
BAN	48	Jah'rie Garner	So
DB	49	Landon Hammond	Fr
DL	53	Jack Stivers	Fr
BAN	89	Miles Smith	Fr
DL	90	Eliyt Nairne	So
DL	92	Armondous Cooley	Sr
NT	93	Elijah Champaigne	Sr
DL	94	Derrick Shepard Jr.	So
DL	95	Tre'Von McAlpine	Jr
DL	96	Geordan Guidry	Fr
DL	97	Nik Alston	Fr
DL	98	PaLanding Drammeh	Fr
DL	99	Josh Lewis	Fr

Special teams

Pos.	#	Name	Class
P	34	William Hudlow	So
K	35	Cooper Helmke	Fr
P	38	Alec Clark	So
K	46	Zach Marini	Fr
LS	53	Zach Billings	GS
LS	57	Jason Arredondo	Fr
LS	59	Phoenix Derichsweiler	Fr
P	62	Aidan Parker	Fr
K	91	Patrick Durkin	Fr

Head coach

- Jon Sumrall

Coordinators/assistant coaches

- Joe Craddock – Offensive coordinator/quarterbacks
- Greg Gasparato – Defensive coordinator/safeties
- Johnathan Galante – Special teams coordinator
- Will Hall – Pass game coordinator/wide receivers
- Evan McKissack – Run game coordinator/offensive line
- Tayler Polk – Co-defensive coordinator/inside linebackers
- Bam Hardmon – Run game coordinator/outside linebackers
- Brock Hays – Running backs
- J. J. McCleskey – Defensive backs
- Carter Sheridan – Wide receivers
- Landius Wilkerson – Defensive line
- Tyler Spotts-Orgeron – Offensive analyst/tight ends coach
- Collin D'Angelo – Offensive analyst/quarterbacks coach
- Brayden Berezowitz – Spears/nickels coach
- Gunner Hudspeth – Special teams analyst
- Kanan Ray – Offensive analyst/offensive line coach
- Bryan Berezowitz – Defensive analyst/safeties coach
- Tyler Kelley – Assistant running backs coach/offensive recruiting specialist
- Byron Ellis – Chief of Staff
- Kelly Comarda – Director of Roster Management
- Cole Heard – General Manager
- Jeremiah Cartwright – Director, football operations
- Derick Bugg – Director, player development
- Rusty Whitt – Director, strength and conditioning
- Colin Kenyon – Assistant, strength and conditioning
- Nick Bell – Assistant, strength and conditioning
- Jonathan Davis – Assistant, strength and conditioning
- Peter Hontas – Graduate assistant
- Logan Self – Graduate assistant
- Chris Wurl – Graduate assistant
- Nathaniel Beal III – Graduate assistant

Legend

- (C) Team captain
- (S) Suspended
- (I) Ineligible
- Injured
- Redshirt

Roster
Last update: 8/12/25

=== Transfers ===
==== Outgoing ====
Player	Position	Destination
Gabriel Fortson	IOL	Arkansas State
Rayshawn Pleasant	CB	Auburn
Rishi Rattan	CB	Austin Peay
Matthew Fobbs-White	EDGE	Baylor
Adonis Friloux	DL	Baylor
Jonathan Kahn	TE	Butler
Trey Cornist	RB	Central Michigan
Darian Mensah	QB	Duke
Guiseann Mirtil	TE	Florida A&M
Deshaun Batiste	EDGE	Florida Atlantic
T. J. Finley	QB	Georgia State
Jesus Machado	LB	Houston
Alex Bauman	TE	Miami (FL)
DK McGruder	CB	Mississippi State
Lucas Desjardins	WR	Murray State
Joshua Goines	TE	New Mexico State
Shaadie Clayton-Johnson	RB	North Texas
Sidney Mbanasor	WR	Old Dominion
Makhi Hughes	RB	Oregon
Mandel Eugene	LB	Prairie View A&M
Jude McCoskey	OT	Purdue
Michael Lunz	LB	South Carolina State
Luke Besh	WR	Southeastern Louisiana
Khai Prean	WR	Southeastern Louisiana
Angelo Anderson	DL	Tarleton State
Ty Cooper	EDGE	Tulsa
Will Karoll	P	UCLA
Kai Horton	QB	Washington
Ethan Head	K	West Virginia
Parker Petersen	DL	Wisconsin
Bobby Noel	K	Unknown
Tate Jernigan	RB	Unknown
Robbie Pizzolato	IOL	Unknown
Rodrek Williams	CB	Withdrawn
Ty Thompson	QB	Withdrawn

==== Incoming ====
Player	Position	Previous School
KC Eziomume	CB	Albany
Jack Hollifield	IOL	Appalachian State
Santana Hopper	DL	Appalachian State
Kadin Semonza	QB	Ball State
Jake Retzlaff	QB	BYU
Zach Billings	LS	Charlotte
Tavare Smith Jr.	S	East Central
John Bock II	IOL	FIU
Omari Hayes	WR	Florida Atlantic
Zuberi Mobley	RB	Florida Atlantic
Donovan Leary	QB	Illinois
Jude McCoskey	OT	Indiana State
Brendan Sullivan	QB	Iowa
Anthony Brown-Stephens	WR	Kentucky
Eliyt Nairne	DL	Liberty
Jordan Hall	OT	Liberty
Jimmy Calloway	WR	Louisville
Maurice Turner	RB	Louisville
Leron Husbands	TE	Maryland
Ty Cooper	DL	Mississippi State
Dallas Winner-Johnson	LB	Missouri State
Robbie Pizzolato	IOL	Nicholls
Jordan Norman	EDGE	South Alabama
Alec Clark	P	Southern Miss
Armondous Cooley	DL	Southern Miss
Justyn Reid	TE	Southern Miss
Mitch Hodnett	OT	TCU
Harvey Dyson	EDGE	Texas Tech
Trevon McAlpine	DL	Texas Tech
L.J. Green	CB	Troy
Dorion Jackson	S	Troy
Derrick Shepard Jr.	DL	UAB
Maurice Westmoreland	EDGE	UTEP
Tre Shackelford	WR	Washington State
Johnny Pascuzzi	TE	West Virginia
T. J. Finley	QB	Western Kentucky
Isaiah Wadsworth	CB	Wofford
