= Javin Gordon =

American football player (born 2007)

No. 6 – Tennessee Volunteers
- Position: Running back
- Class: Sophomore

Personal information
- Born: February 3, 2007 (age 19)
- Listed height: 5 ft 10 in (1.78 m)
- Listed weight: 212 lb (96 kg)

Career information
- High school: Stephens County (Toccoa, Georgia)
- College: Tulane (2025); Tennessee (2026–present)
- Stats at ESPN

Javin Gordon (born February 3, 2007) is an American college football running back for the Tennessee Volunteers. He previously played for the Tulane Green Wave.

== Early life ==
Gordon attended Stephens County High School in Toccoa, Georgia. He was named the region's Offensive Player of the Year as both a junior and senior, rushing for more than 1,000 yards in each season. Following his graduation, Gordon committed to play college football at Tulane University.

== College career ==
Gordon earned immediate playing time as a true freshman, rushing for three touchdowns in a 31–14 win over Tulsa. He finished his first season with 516 rushing yards and five touchdowns as Tulane made its first College Football Playoff appearance. Following the season, Gordon entered the transfer portal.

On January 17, 2026, Gordon announced his decision to transfer to the University of Tennessee to play for the Tennessee Volunteers. Entering the 2026 season, he is expected to play a significant role in the Volunteers' run game.

=== Statistics ===
College statistics
Season	Team	Games	Rushing				Receiving			
Season	Team	GP	Att	Yards	Avg	TD	Rec	Yards	Avg	TD
2025	Tulane	14	128	516	4.0	5	13	93	7.2	1
Career		14	128	516	4.0	5	13	93	7.2	1

== Personal life ==
Gordon is the cousin of former Tennessee running back, Tauren Poole.
