= 2025 American Conference Football Championship Game =

- Conference Championship Game
North Texas Mean Green	Tulane Green Wave
(11–1)	(10–2)
21	34
Head coach: Eric Morris	Head coach: Jon Sumrall
AP / Coaches / CFP; 20 / 20 / 24	AP / Coaches / CFP; 21 / 21 / 20
	1	2	3	4	Total
North Texas	7	0	6	8	21
Tulane	7	17	7	3	34
- Date: December 5, 2025
- Season: 2025
- Stadium: Yulman Stadium
- Location: New Orleans, Louisiana
- MVP: Jack Tchienchou, S, Tulane
- Favorite: North Texas by 1.5

United States TV coverage
- Network: ABC; ESPN Radio
- Announcers: Mark Jones (play-by-play), Roddy Jones (analyst), and Quint Kessenich (sideline reporter) (ABC); Chris Carlin (play-by-play), Tom Ramsey (analyst), and Marilyn Payne (sideline reporter) (ESPN Radio)

2025 American Conference football standings
	Conf.			Overall
Team	W		L	W		L
No. 20 Tulane y$^	7	–	1	11	–	3
No. 25 North Texas y	7	–	1	12	–	2
Navy	7	–	1	11	–	2
South Florida	6	–	2	9	–	4
East Carolina	6	–	2	9	–	4
Memphis	4	–	4	8	–	5
Army	4	–	4	7	–	6
UTSA	4	–	4	7	–	6
Temple	3	–	5	5	–	7
Florida Atlantic	3	–	5	4	–	8
Rice	2	–	6	5	–	7
UAB	2	–	6	4	–	8
Tulsa	1	–	7	4	–	8
Charlotte	0	–	8	1	–	11
Championship: Tulane 34, North Texas 21
^ – College Football Playoff participant; $ – Conference champion; y – Championship game participant; Rankings from CFP Rankings

The 2025 American Conference Football Championship Game (officially known as the 2025 American Conference Football Championship Game presented by LLH Healthcare for sponsorship reasons) was a college football played on December 5, 2025 to determine the champion of the American Conference for the 2025 season. It was the 11th American Conference Football Championship Game. The game started at 8:00 p.m. EST and was aired on ABC. The game featured the Tulane Green Wave against the North Texas Mean Green.

This was the first championship game played under the "American Conference" name, as on July 21, 2025, the conference dropped the word "Athletic" from its previous name.

Before the game, both teams' head coaches were announced to have accepted jobs at other programs, with North Texas head coach Eric Morris joining Oklahoma State and Tulane head coach Jon Sumrall joining Florida. Both coaches were allowed to coach this game, along with any potential College Football Playoff games.

== Teams ==
The 2025 American Conference Championship Game featured the Tulane Green Wave and the North Texas Mean Green. This was the fourth consecutive American title game appearance for Tulane and its fourth overall. This was the first American title game appearance for North Texas in its third season in The American.

On November 29, 2025, the Conference announced that Tulane was selected as the host of the game due to being ranked at the time in the College Football Playoff Rankings, whereas North Texas was unranked.

This was the 4th meeting between Tulane and North Texas, with the Green Wave winning all three previous meetings. With both teams ranked above James Madison in the penulatmate College Football Playoff ranking, a win by either side would have almost certainly clinched a berth in the 2025 CFP.

=== North Texas ===
North Texas clinched a spot in the game following its victory over Temple on November 28.

=== Tulane ===
Tulane clinched a spot in the game following its victory over Charlotte on November 29.

=== Scoring summary ===
2025 American Conference Championship Game
No. 24 North Texas Mean Green (11–1, 7–1) vs. No. 20 Tulane Green Wave (10–2, 7–1)

Quarter	1	2	3	4	Total
No. 24 North Texas	7	0	6	8	21
No. 20 Tulane	7	17	7	3	34

at Yulman Stadium • New Orleans, LA

- Date: Friday, December 5, 2025
- Game time: 8:00 p.m. EST
- Game weather: Overcast • Temperature: 52 °F (11 °C) • Wind: NNW at 6 miles per hour (9.7 km/h)
- Game attendance: 23,986
- TV announcers (ABC): Mark Jones (play-by-play), Roddy Jones (analyst), and Quint Kessenich (sideline reporter)

Game information

First quarter

- UNT – Tre Williams III 10-yard pass from Drew Mestemaker (Kali Nguma kick), 8:32. Mean Green 7–0. Drive: 15 plays, 75 yards, 6:28.
- TULN – Jake Retzlaff 2-yard run (Patrick Durkin kick), 0:30. Tied 7–7. Drive: 16 plays, 81 yards, 7:57.

Second quarter

- TULN – Jamauri McClure 7-yard run (Patrick Durkin kick), 12:29. Green Wave 14–7. Drive: 2 plays, 37 yards, 0:55.
- TULN – Patrick Durkin 30-yard field goal, 5:46. Green Wave 17–7. Drive: 10 plays, 46 yards, 4:39.
- TULN – Jake Retzlaff 1-yard run (Patrick Durkin kick), 0:03. Green Wave 24–7. Drive: 6 plays, 13 yards, 0:47.

Third quarter

- TULN – Chris Rodgers 35-yard interception return (Patrick Durkin kick), 7:32. Green Wave 31–7.
- UNT – Miles Coleman 59-yard pass from Drew Mestemaker (pass failed), 0:16. Green Wave 31–13. Drive: 4 plays, 60 yards, 1:03.

Fourth quarter

- UNT – Ashton Gray 9-yard run (Ashton Gray run), 9:26. Green Wave 31–21. Drive: 8 plays, 88 yards, 2:54.
- TULN – Patrick Durkin 30-yard field goal, 2:51. Green Wave 34–21. Drive: 12 plays, 66 yards, 6:29.

Statistics	UNT	TUL
First downs	25	22
Plays–yards	68–415	74–344
Rushes–yards	34–121	52–199
Passing yards	294	145
Passing: comp–att–int	21–34–3	13–22–0
Time of possession	24:52	35:08

Team	Category	Player	Statistics
North Texas	Passing	Drew Mestemaker	21/34, 294 yards, 2 TD, 3 INT
North Texas	Rushing	Ashton Gray	8 carries, 47 yards, TD
North Texas	Receiving	Miles Coleman	7 receptions, 125 yards, TD
Tulane	Passing	Jake Retzlaff	13/22, 145 yards
Tulane	Rushing	Jamauri McClure	22 carries, 121 yards, TD
Tulane	Receiving	Garrett Mmahat	3 receptions, 39 yards
