= Jack Tchienchou =

American football player (born 2005)

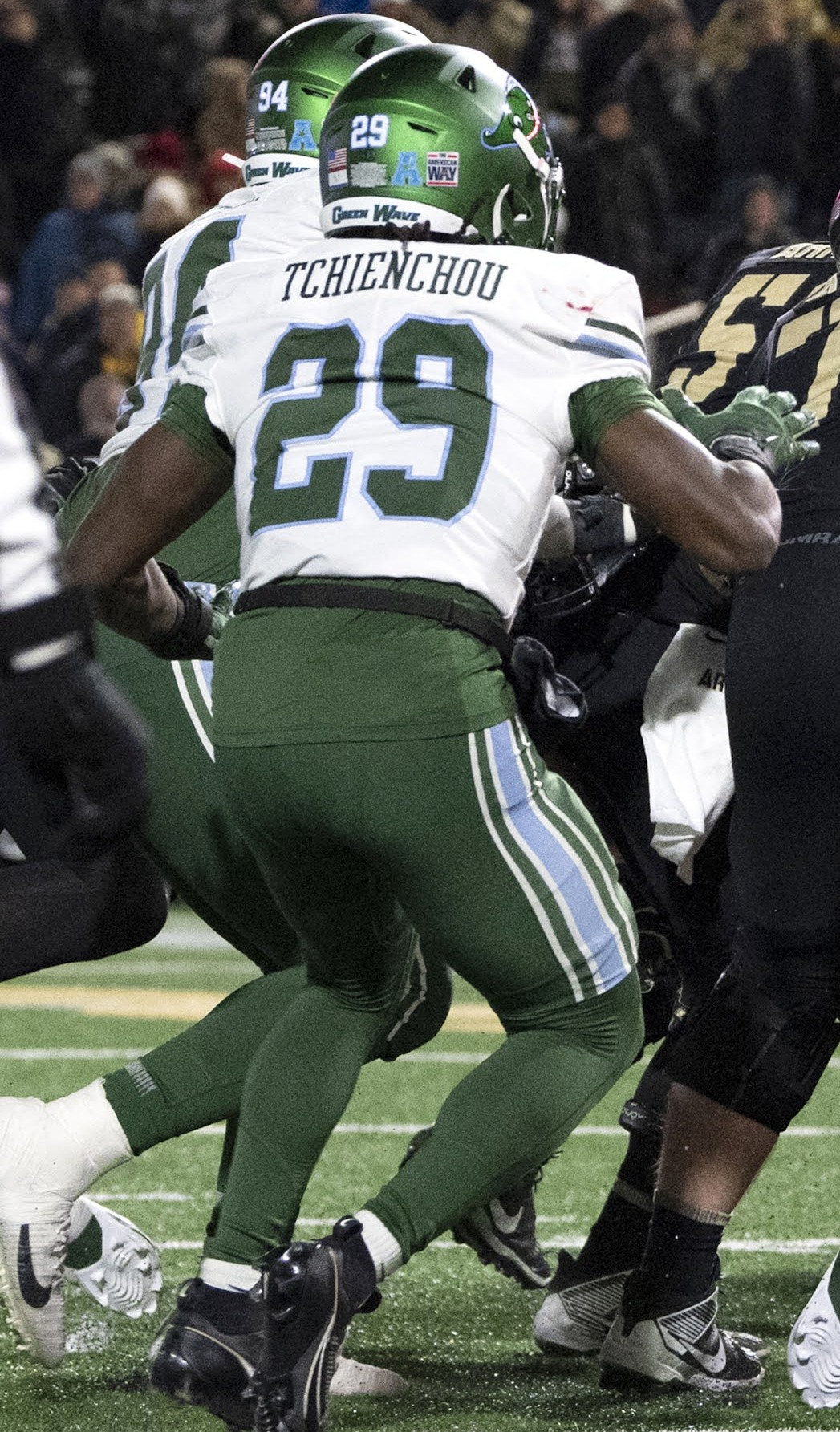

No. 1 – Tulane Green Wave
- Position: Safety
- Class: Redshirt Junior

Personal information
- Born: March 24, 2005 (age 21)
- Listed height: 5 ft 10 in (1.78 m)
- Listed weight: 192 lb (87 kg)

Career information
- High school: St. Pius X (Atlanta, Georgia)
- College: Troy (2023); Tulane (2024–present)

Awards and highlights
- First-team All-American Conference (2025); The American Championship Game MVP (2025)
- Stats at ESPN

Jack Tchienchou (born March 24, 2005) is an American college football safety for the Tulane Green Wave. He previously played for the Troy Trojans.

== Early life ==
He attended St. Pius X High School in Atlanta, Georgia. As a senior, he was named Georgia Region 4-6A Defensive Player of the Year; as a junior, he was Region 5-6A Player of the Year.

In high school, he accumulated 86 tackles, three interceptions, and eight pass breakups on defense. On offense, he rushed for 856 yards and nine touchdowns and finished with 1,228 yards as a senior.

== College career ==
Tchienchou began his college career at Troy in 2023, appearing in six games and totaling three tackles (two solo).

He transferred to Tulane in the spring of 2024.

In the 2024 season, his first with Tulane, he played in 13 games and recorded 50 tackles and an interception which he returned for a touchdown against the Louisiana Ragin' Cajuns on September 21.

On December 6, 2025, Tchienchou had 9 tackles, an interception, a force fumble and a fumble recovery on route to being named the AAC championship game MVP as Tulane defeated North Texas 34–21. During the 2025 season, Tchienchou recorded a team high 83 tackles, and was named to the 2025 All-American Athletic Conference first team.
