= Jake Retzlaff =

American football player (born 2003)

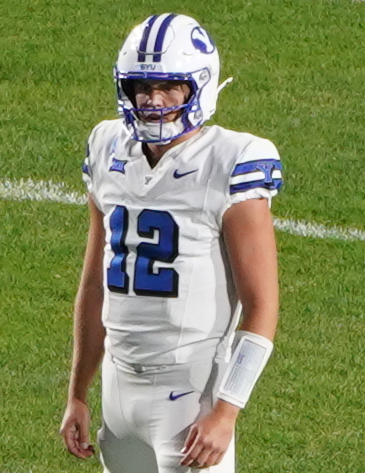
- Retzlaff in 2024

No. 12
- Position: Quarterback

Personal information
- Born: March 28, 2003 (age 23); Corona, California, U.S.
- Listed height: 6 ft 1 in (1.85 m)
- Listed weight: 209 lb (95 kg)

Career information
- High school: Centennial
- College: Golden West (2021); Riverside (2022); BYU (2023–2024); Tulane (2025)
- NFL draft: 2026: undrafted
- Stats at Pro Football Reference

Jake Retzlaff (born March 28, 2003) is an American football quarterback. He previously played college football for the Golden West Rustlers, Riverside Tigers, BYU Cougars, and the Tulane Green Wave.

== Early life ==
Retzlaff attended Centennial High School in Corona, California. As a junior, he totaled 1,067 passing yards and eight touchdowns, before not being allowed to play in his senior year due to the COVID-19 pandemic. At the conclusion of his high school career, Retzlaff committed to play college football at Golden West College.

== College career ==
As a true freshman for Golden West College in 2021, Retzlaff threw for 3,302 yards and 23 touchdowns before deciding to transfer to Riverside City College. The following season with Riverside, he started 13 games, recording 4,596 yards passing, and 44 touchdowns, in addition to setting the school record for most passing yards in a game (529) and passing touchdowns in a single game (6). He entered the transfer portal for the second time at the season's end.

=== BYU ===
As the number one rated junior college quarterback in the nation, Retzlaff announced in January 2023, that he would be transferring to BYU. Entering the 2023 season, he was named the second-string quarterback behind Pittsburgh transfer Kedon Slovis. After an injury to Slovis, Retzlaff was named the starting quarterback against West Virginia. In his first career start, he threw for 210 yards in a 37–7 loss. The following week, he was once again named the starting quarterback. In his second career start against Iowa State, he threw his first career touchdown pass at the FBS level in a 45–13 defeat. Retzlaff finished the season throwing for 648 yards and three touchdowns, while also rushing for 116 yards and three touchdowns.

Entering the 2024 season, Retzlaff competed with Gerry Bohanon for BYU's starting quarterback job, eventually being named the week one starter. In the season opener against Southern Illinois, he threw for 348 yards and three touchdowns in a 41–13 victory. Against Oklahoma State, Retzlaff threw for 218 yards and two touchdowns, including the game-winning 35-yard touchdown pass to Darius Lassiter, while also rushing for 81 yards and a touchdown in a 38–35 win. He finished the season throwing for 2,947 yards and 20 touchdowns, while also rushing for 417 yards and six touchdowns, leading the Cougars to an 11–2 record.

In June 2025, Retzlaff met with BYU school officials and was informed that he would likely receive a seven-game suspension after he admitted to having premarital sex, a violation of the school's honor code. On June 29, Retzlaff announced his decision to enter the transfer portal for a third time.

=== Tulane ===
On July 21, 2025, Retzlaff announced his decision to transfer to Tulane University to play for the Tulane Green Wave. He was named the team's starting quarterback prior to the season opener against Northwestern. In Retzlaff's debut for the Green Wave, he recorded 265 total yards and two touchdowns in a 23–3 victory. Against Duke, he threw for 245 yards, in addition to rushing for 111 yards and four touchdowns, leading Tulane to a 34–27 win. Following his performance, Retzlaff was named the American Offensive Player of the Week. In the 2025 American Conference Championship Game, he threw for 145 and accounted for two rushing touchdowns, leading the Green Wave to a 34–21 victory and helping Tulane clinch their first bid to the College Football Playoff as one of the top five highest-ranked conference champions. Against Ole Miss in the first round of the College Football Playoff, Retzlaff completed 20 of 35 passes for 306 yards and a touchdown, as the Green Wave's season ended with a 41–10 defeat.

=== Statistics ===
Season	Team	Games			Passing								Rushing			
Season	Team	GP	GS	Record	Cmp	Att	Pct	Yds	Avg	TD	Int	Rtg	Att	Yds	Avg	TD
2021	Golden West	12	12	11–1	243	409	59.4	3,302	8.1	23	5	143.3	90	380	4.2	9
2022	Riverside	13	13	12–1	312	493	63.3	4,596	9.3	44	14	165.4	79	515	6.5	6
2023	BYU	4	4	0–4	63	125	50.4	648	5.2	3	3	97.1	51	116	2.3	3
2024	BYU	13	13	11–2	213	368	57.9	2,947	8.0	20	12	136.6	100	417	4.2	6
2025	Tulane	14	14	11–3	242	391	61.9	3,168	8.1	15	7	139.0	129	634	4.9	16
CCCAA Career		25	25	23–2	555	902	61.5	7,898	8.8	67	19	155.4	169	895	5.3	15
NCAA Career		31	31	22–9	518	884	58.6	6,763	7.7	38	22	132.1	280	1,167	4.2	25

== Professional career ==
Pre-draft measurables
Height	Weight	Arm length	Hand span	Wingspan
6 ft 0 3/4 in (1.85 m)	209 lb (95 kg)	30 5/8 in (0.78 m)	8 3/4 in (0.22 m)	6 ft 3 3/4 in (1.92 m)
All values from Pro Day

Retzlaff attended rookie minicamp for the Seattle Seahawks and New York Jets.

== Personal life ==
In 2023, Retzlaff became the first ever Jewish quarterback to play at BYU. In 2024, Retzlaff signed an NIL deal with the Jewish food brand Manischewitz, becoming the first athlete to do so.

Retzlaff's Jewish practice received national attention while he was at BYU. The Associated Press reported that he studied Torah weekly with Rabbi Chaim Zippel, attended Shabbat dinners at Chabad, led a public Hanukkah menorah lighting in Provo, and wrapped tefillin with Zippel in BYU's stadium.

In May 2025, a woman identified as Jane Doe A.G. sued Retzlaff, accusing him of sexually assaulting her at his home in November 2023. The case was later dropped on June 30, with mutual agreement to dismiss the case with prejudice.

Retzlaff has received various nicknames including, "BY-Jew" and "Bayou Jew" as a testament to his status as a Jewish athlete.

== See also ==
- List of select Jewish football players
