= Jamauri McClure =

American football player

No. 25 – Tulane Green Wave
- Position: Running back
- Class: (redshirt) Sophomore

Personal information
- Listed height: 5 ft 10 in (1.78 m)
- Listed weight: 190 lb (86 kg)

Career information
- High school: Goshen (Goshen, Alabama)
- College: Tulane (2024–present)
- Stats at ESPN

Jamauri McClure is an American college football running back for the Tulane Green Wave.

== Early life ==
McClure attended Goshen High School in Goshen, Alabama. As a senior, he rushed for 1,618 yards and 25 touchdowns. In addition to football, McClure ran track and was a state champion. He was originally committed to South Alabama but later decommitted and signed with Tulane University to play college football.

== College career ==
McClure earned a redshirt in 2024, totaling 20 carries for 121 yards and a touchdown in five games. His playing time increased during his redshirt freshman year. Against Florida Atlantic, McClure rushed for 94 yards and a touchdown. In the American Conference Championship Game against North Texas, he carried the ball 22 times for 121 yards and a touchdown.

=== Statistics ===
College statistics
Season	Team	Games	Rushing				Receiving			
Season	Team	GP	Att	Yards	Avg	TD	Rec	Yards	Avg	TD
2024	Tulane	5	20	121	6.1	1	1	24	24.0	0
2025	Tulane	12	68	456	6.7	2	3	8	2.7	0
Career		17	88	577	6.6	3	4	32	8.0	0
