= Cameron Dorner =

American football player (born 2004)

Profile
- Position: Wide receiver

Personal information
- Born: February 4, 2004 (age 22); New Market, Maryland, U.S.
- Listed height: 6 ft 1 in (1.85 m)
- Listed weight: 188 lb (85 kg)

Career information
- High school: Oakdale (New Market, Maryland)
- College: Shepherd (2022–2024); North Texas (2025)
- NFL draft: 2026: undrafted

Career history
- New England Patriots (2026)*
- * Offseason or practice squad member only
- Stats at Pro Football Reference

Cameron Dorner (born February 4, 2004) is an American football wide receiver. He played college football for Shepherd University and the North Texas Mean Green.

== Early life ==
Dormer was born in New Market, Maryland and was a student athlete at Oakdale High School in New Market. A three-sport athlete he played basketball and ran track in high school as well as football where he led his high school football team in catches, receiving yards and touchdowns as a senior.

== College career ==
Dorner played division II at Shepherd University from 2022 to 2024 before transferring to North Texas in 2025 for his final season. He played in 47 games in college with 23 starts, totaling 175 catches for 2,378 yards with 21 touchdowns. He ranked second on the team in 2025 with 56 receptions for 911 yards.

== Professional career ==
Pre-draft measurables
Height	Weight	Arm length	Hand span	Wingspan	40-yard dash	10-yard split	20-yard split	20-yard shuttle	Three-cone drill	Vertical jump	Broad jump	Bench press
6 ft 0 3/4 in (1.85 m)	188 lb (85 kg)	30 3/8 in (0.77 m)	9 1/8 in (0.23 m)	6 ft 1 3/8 in (1.86 m)	4.59 s	1.57 s	2.72 s	4.07 s	6.96 s	37.5 in (0.95 m)	10 ft 1 in (3.07 m)	12 reps
All values from Pro Day

Dorner was signed by the New England Patriots as an undrafted free agent on May 8, 2026. Dorner had a strong start to the summer training camp but dealt with injuries midway through camp, but returned in mid-August. In the three Patriots preseason games of the year, Dorner had five targets with four receptions and 37 yards. Dorner was cut on August 30, and was re–signed to the Patriots' practice squad the next day. He was released on November 3.
