= 2025 UTSA Roadrunners football team =

American college football season

2025 UTSA Roadrunners football

First Responder Bowl champion

First Responder Bowl, W 57–20 vs. FIU
- Conference: American Conference
- Record: 7–6 (4–4 American)
- Head coach: Jeff Traylor (6th season)
- Offensive coordinator: Justin Burke (3rd season)
- Offensive scheme: Multiple
- Defensive coordinator: Jess Loepp (5th season)
- Base defense: 3–4
- Home stadium: Alamodome

2025 American Conference football standings
	Conf.			Overall
Team	W		L	W		L
No. 18 Tulane y$^	7	–	1	11	–	3
No. 24 North Texas y	7	–	1	12	–	2
No. 23 Navy	7	–	1	11	–	2
South Florida	6	–	2	9	–	4
East Carolina	6	–	2	9	–	4
Memphis	4	–	4	8	–	5
Army	4	–	4	7	–	6
UTSA	4	–	4	7	–	6
Temple	3	–	5	5	–	7
Florida Atlantic	3	–	5	4	–	8
Rice	2	–	6	5	–	8
UAB	2	–	6	4	–	8
Tulsa	1	–	7	4	–	8
Charlotte	0	–	8	1	–	11
Championship: Tulane 34, North Texas 21
^ – College Football Playoff participant; $ – Conference champion; y – Championship game participant; Rankings from AP Poll

The 2025 UTSA Roadrunners football team represented the University of Texas at San Antonio (UTSA) as a member of the American Conference during the 2025 NCAA Division I FBS football season. Led by sixth-year head coach Jeff Traylor, the Roadrunners played their home games at the Alamodome in San Antonio.

== Schedule ==
The American Athletic Conference announced the 2025 football conference opponents for the Roadrunners on August 15, 2024. On July 25, 2024, UTSA completed their scheduling of nonconference opponents with a game against Incarnate Word from the Southland Conference. The other three opponents includes games against, Colorado State from the Mountain West Conference, Texas A&M from the Southeastern Conference and rival Texas State from the Sun Belt Conference.

Date	Time	Opponent	Site	TV	Result	Attendance
August 30	6:00 p.m.	at No. 19 Texas A&M*	Kyle Field; College Station, TX	ESPN	L 24–42	107,521
September 6	2:30 p.m.	Texas State*	Alamodome; San Antonio, TX (I-35 Rivalry)	ESPN+	L 36–43	45,778
September 13	2:30 p.m.	No. 14 (FCS) Incarnate Word*	Alamodome; San Antonio, TX (Hometown Showdown)	ESPN+	W 48–20	20,421
September 20	8:30 p.m.	at Colorado State*	Canvas Stadium; Fort Collins, CO	FS1	W 17–16	32,061
October 4	12:00 p.m.	at Temple	Lincoln Financial Field; Philadelphia, PA	ESPN+	L 21–27	12,132
October 11	6:30 p.m.	Rice^{†}	Alamodome; San Antonio, TX	ESPNU	W 61–13	22,058
October 18	2:30 p.m.	at North Texas	DATCU Stadium; Denton, TX	ESPN+	L 17–55	25,053
October 30	6:30 p.m.	Tulane	Alamodome; San Antonio, TX	ESPN	W 48–26	16,715
November 6	6:30 p.m.	at South Florida	Raymond James Stadium; Tampa, FL	ESPN	L 23–55	27,437
November 15	11:00 a.m.	at Charlotte	Jerry Richardson Stadium; Charlotte, NC	ESPN+	W 28–7	9,831
November 22	2:30 p.m.	East Carolina	Alamodome; San Antonio, TX	ESPN+	W 58–24	18,573
November 29	2:30 p.m.	Army	Alamodome; San Antonio, TX	ESPN+	L 24–27	22,620
December 26	7:00 p.m.	vs. FIU*	Gerald J. Ford Stadium; Dallas, TX (First Responder Bowl)	ESPN	W 57–20	8,671
*Non-conference game; ^{†}Homecoming; Rankings from AP Poll - Released prior to game; All times are in Central time

== Game summaries ==
=== at No. 19 Texas A&M ===
UTSA Roadrunners (0–0) at No. 19 Texas A&M Aggies (0–0) – Game summary

Quarter	1	2	3	4	Total
Roadrunners	3	7	7	7	24
No. 19 Aggies	7	14	14	7	42

at Kyle Field • College Station, TX

- Date: August 30
- Game time: 6:00 p.m. CDT
- Game weather: Cloudy • Temperature: 84 °F (29 °C) • Wind: NE at 18 miles per hour (29 km/h)
- Game attendance: 107,521
- Referee: Matt Loeffler
- TV announcers (ESPN): Anish Shroff (play-by-play), Andre Ware (analyst) and Paul Carcaterra (sideline)

Game information

First quarter

- (7:21) TA&M – KC Concepcion 80-yard punt return, Jared Zirkel kick (Texas A&M 7–0)
- (1:53) UTSA – Michael Petro 36-yard field goal (Drive: 12 plays, 56 yards, 5:28; Texas A&M 7–3)

Second quarter

- (13:13) TA&M – Mario Craver 24-yard pass from Marcel Reed, Jared Zirkel kick (Drive: 7 plays, 63 yards, 3:40; Texas A&M 14–3)
- (8:33) UTSA – Robert Henry Jr. 15-yard run, Michael Petro kick (Drive: 9 plays, 75 yards, 4:40; Texas A&M 14–10)
- (5:38) TA&M – KC Concepcion 31-yard pass from Marcel Reed, Jared Zirkel kick (Drive: 6 plays, 67 yards, 2:55; Texas A&M 21–10)

Third quarter

- (14:47) UTSA – Robert Henry Jr. 75-yard run, Michael Petro kick (Drive: 1 play, 75 yards, 0:13; Texas A&M 21–17)
- (7:10) TA&M – Theo Melin Öhrström 1-yard pass from Marcel Reed, Jared Zirkel kick (Drive: 9 plays, 78 yards, 4:31; Texas A&M 28–17)
- (2:48) TA&M – Mario Craver 22-yard pass from Marcel Reed, Jared Zirkel kick (Drive: 5 plays, 67 yards, 2:48; Texas A&M 35–17)

Fourth quarter

- (7:16) TA&M – E. J. Smith 3-yard run, Jared Zirkel kick (Drive: 3 plays, 29 yards, 1:18; Texas A&M 42–17)
- (0:14) UTSA – AJ Wilson 34-yard pass from Brandon Tennison, Michael Petro kick (Drive: 9 plays, 72 yards, 3:08; Texas A&M 42–24)

Statistics	UTSA	TA&M
First downs	17	17
Plays–yards	67–373	59–399
Rushes–yards	33–203	23–108
Passing yards	170	291
Passing: comp–att–int	21–34–0	23–36–0
Turnovers	0	0
Time of possession	33:41	26:19

Team	Category	Player	Statistics
UTSA	Passing	Owen McCown	19/32, 121 yards
UTSA	Rushing	Robert Henry Jr.	16 carries, 177 yards, 2 TD
UTSA	Receiving	David Amador II	3 receptions, 41 yards
Texas A&M	Passing	Marcel Reed	22/34, 289 yards, 4 TD
Texas A&M	Rushing	Marcel Reed	8 carries, 39 yards
Texas A&M	Receiving	Mario Craver	8 receptions, 122 yards, 2 TD

=== Texas State (rivalry) ===
Texas State Bobcats (1–0) at UTSA Roadrunners (0–1) – Game summary

Quarter	1	2	3	4	Total
Bobcats	2	17	10	14	43
Roadrunners	0	14	14	8	36

at Alamodome • San Antonio, TX

- Date: September 6
- Game time: 2:30 p.m.CDT
- Game weather: None (played indoors)
- Game attendance: 45,778
- Referee: Charles Lamertina
- TV announcers (ESPN+): Jack Benjamin (play-by-play) and LaDarrin McLane (analyst)

Game information

First quarter

- (12:19) TXST – Team safety (Texas State 2–0)

Second quarter

- (12:10) TXST – Lincoln Pare 1-yard run, Tyler Robles kick (Drive: 10 plays, 95 yards, 4:22; Texas State 9–0)
- (9:02) UTSA – A'Marion Peterson 1-yard run, Michael Petro kick (Drive: 8 plays, 75 yards, 3:08; Texas State 9–7)
- (4:04) TXST – Brad Jackson 9-yard run, Tyler Robles kick (Drive: 5 plays, 64 yards, 2:34; Texas State 16–7)
- (0:37) UTSA – DJ Allen Jr. 1-yard pass from Owen McCown, Michael Petro kick (Drive: 8 plays, 65 yards, 3:20; Texas State 16–14)
- (0:00) TXST – Tyler Robles 50-yard field goal (Drive: 7 plays, 41 yards, 0:37; Texas State 19–14)

Third quarter

- (14:44) UTSA – Robert Henry Jr. 75-yard run, Michael Petro kick (Drive: 2 plays, 75 yards, 0:16; UTSA 21–19)
- (11:35) TXST – Jaylen Jenkins 17-yard run, Tyler Robles kick (Drive: 7 plays, 75 yards, 3:09; Texas State 26–21)
- (7:36) UTSA – Robert Henry Jr. 4-yard pass from Owen McCown, Michael Petro kick (Drive: 9 plays, 70 yards, 3:59; UTSA 28–26)
- (4:24) TXST – Tyler Robles 38-yard field goal (Drive: 6 plays, 60 yards, 3:06; Texas State 29–28)

Fourth quarter

- (14:11) TXST – Brad Jackson 6-yard run, Tyler Robles kick (Drive: 6 plays, 57 yards, 2:46; Texas State 36–28)
- (10:22) UTSA – Robert Henry Jr. 30-yard run, Devin McCuin pass (Drive: 8 plays, 75 yards, 3:49; Tied 36–36)
- (10:08) TXST – Beau Sparks 65-yard pass from Brad Jackson, Tyler Robles kick (Drive: 1 play, 65 yards, 0:08; Texas State 43–36)

Statistics	TXST	UTSA
First downs	17	25
Plays–yards	66–454	77–464
Rushes–yards	46–168	34–245
Passing yards	286	219
Passing: comp–att–int	12–20–1	23–43–0
Turnovers	1	0
Time of possession	29:37	30:23

Team	Category	Player	Statistics
Texas State	Passing	Brad Jackson	12/22, 286 yards, TD, INT
Texas State	Rushing	Lincoln Pare	21 carries, 71 yards, TD
Texas State	Receiving	Beau Sparks	5 receptions, 155 yards, TD
UTSA	Passing	Owen McCown	23/43, 219 yards, 2 TD
UTSA	Rushing	Robert Henry Jr.	17 carries, 159 yards, 2 TD
UTSA	Receiving	Devin McCuin	5 receptions, 83 yards

=== No. 14 (FCS) Incarnate Word ===
No. 14 (FCS) Incarnate Word Cardinals (1–1) at UTSA Roadrunners (0–2) – Game summary

Quarter	1	2	3	4	Total
No. 14 (FCS) Cardinals	0	0	14	6	20
Roadrunners	10	14	14	10	48

at Alamodome • San Antonio, TX

- Date: September 13
- Game time: 2:30 p.m. CDT
- Game weather: None (played indoors)
- Game attendance: 20,421
- Referee: Kevin Randall
- TV announcers (ESPN+): Jack Benjamin (play-by-play) and Dave Steckel (analyst)

Game information

First quarter

- (10:46) UTSA – Devin McCuin 13-yard pass from Owen McCown, Michael Petro kick (Drive: 6 plays, 33 yards, 2:39; UTSA 7–0)
- (5:28) UTSA – Michael Petro 26-yard field goal (Drive: 8 plays, 67 yards, 3:42; UTSA 10–0)

Second quarter

- (9:23) UTSA – Robert Henry Jr. 3-yard run, Michael Petro kick (Drive: 8 plays, 39 yards, 4:09; UTSA 17–0)
- (8:03) UTSA – Dan Dishman 4-yard pass from Owen McCown, Michael Petro kick (Drive: 1 play, 4 yards, 0:04; UTSA 24–0)

Third quarter

- (13:40) UTSA – Robert Henry Jr. 74-yard run, Michael Petro kick (Drive: 3 plays, 75 yards, 1:20; UTSA 31–0)
- (12:51) UIW – Chedon James 38-yard pass from EJ Colson, Will Faris kick (Drive: 3 plays, 50 yards, 0:49; UTSA 31–7)
- (12:04) UTSA – AJ Wilson 77-yard pass from Owen McCown, Michael Petro kick (Drive: 2 plays, 81 yards, 0:42; UTSA 38–7)
- (7:55) UIW – Chedon James 15-yard pass from EJ Colson, Will Faris kick (Drive: 11 plays, 75 yards, 4:09; UTSA 38–14)

Fourth quarter

- (9:19) UTSA – Michael Petro 31-yard field goal (Drive: 7 plays, 42 yards, 2:57; UTSA 41–14)
- (6:19) UIW – Chedon James 36-yard pass from EJ Colson, pass failed (Drive: 9 plays, 75 yards, 3:00; UTSA 41–20)
- (4:06) UTSA – Devin McCuin 24-yard pass from Owen McCown, Michael Petro kick (Drive: 4 plays, 46 yards, 2:11; UTSA 48–20)

Statistics	UIW	UTSA
First downs	23	22
Plays–yards	72–357	70–442
Rushes–yards	27–33	34–199
Passing yards	324	243
Passing: comp–att–int	31–45–2	29–35–0
Turnovers	4	0
Time of possession	25:48	34:12

Team	Category	Player	Statistics
Incarnate Word	Passing	EJ Colson	17/24, 213 yards, 3 TD
Incarnate Word	Rushing	Jaylon Spears	5 carries, 26 yards
Incarnate Word	Receiving	Chedon James	8 receptions, 134 yards, 3 TD
UTSA	Passing	Owen McCown	30/36, 243 yards, 4 TD
UTSA	Rushing	Robert Henry Jr.	14 carries, 144 yards, 2 TD
UTSA	Receiving	AJ Wilson	5 receptions, 104 yards, TD

=== at Colorado State ===
UTSA Roadrunners (1–2) at Colorado State Rams (1–1) – Game summary

Quarter	1	2	3	4	Total
Roadrunners	0	10	0	7	17
Rams	0	3	0	13	16

at Canvas Stadium • Fort Collins, CO

- Date: September 20
- Game time: 8:30 p.m. CDT
- Game weather: Cloudy • Temperature: 68 °F (20 °C) • Wind: NW at 7 miles per hour (11 km/h)
- Game attendance: 32,061
- Referee: Cal McNeill
- TV announcers (FS1): Dan Hellie (play-by-play) and Petros Papadakis (analyst)

Game information

First quarter

- No scoring plays

Second quarter

- (10:42) UTSA – Robert Henry Jr. 76-yard run, Michael Petro kick (Drive: 3 plays, 83 yards, 0:50; UTSA 7–0)
- (7:04) CSU – Isaiah Hankins 23-yard field goal (Drive: 7 plays, 69 yards, 3:38; UTSA 7–3)
- (0:48) UTSA – Michael Petro 40-yard field goal (Drive: 9 plays, 23 yards, 2:52; UTSA 10–3)

Third quarter

- No scoring plays

Fourth quarter

- (6:19) CSU – Tahj Bullock 10-yard run, Isaiah Hankins kick (Drive: 9 plays, 67 yards, 5:24; Tied 10–10)
- (4:49) UTSA – Robert Henry Jr. 74-yard pass from Owen McCown, Michael Petro kick (Drive: 3 plays, 75 yards, 1:30; UTSA 17–10)
- (0:29) CSU – Rocky Beers 4-yard pass from Jackson Brousseau, pass failed (Drive: 13 plays, 75 yards, 4:20; UTSA 17–16)

Statistics	UTSA	CSU
First downs	13	20
Plays–yards	60–345	75–407
Rushes–yards	33–172	37–153
Passing yards	173	254
Passing: Comp–Att–Int	14–27–2	24–38–0
Turnovers	2	0
Time of possession	26:27	33:33

Team	Category	Player	Statistics
UTSA	Passing	Owen McCown	14/27, 173 yards, TD, 2 INT
UTSA	Rushing	Robert Henry Jr.	21 carries, 144 yards, TD
UTSA	Receiving	Robert Henry Jr.	2 receptions, 76 yards, TD
Colorado State	Passing	Brayden Fowler-Nicolosi	14/25, 176 yards
Colorado State	Rushing	Lloyd Avant	10 carries, 96 yards
Colorado State	Receiving	Armani Winfield	6 receptions, 93 yards

=== at Temple ===
UTSA Roadrunners (2–2) at Temple Owls (2–2) – Game summary

Quarter	1	2	3	4	Total
Roadrunners	7	7	7	0	21
Owls	3	0	21	3	27

at Lincoln Financial Field • Philadelphia, PA

- Date: October 4
- Game time: 12:00 p.m. CDT
- Game weather: Sunny • Temperature: 77 °F (25 °C) • Wind: NE at 3 miles per hour (4.8 km/h)
- Game attendance: 12,132
- Referee: Steven Anderson
- TV announcers (ESPN+): Richard Cross (play-by-play), Barrett Brooks (analyst) and Maria Trivelpiece (sideline)

Game information

First quarter

- (8:44) UTSA – Patrick Overmyer 1-yard run, Michael Petro kick (Drive: 12 plays, 75 yards, 6:16; UTSA 7–0)
- (5:53) TEM – Carl Hardin 31-yard field goal (Drive: 7 plays, 57 yards, 2:46; UTSA 7–3)

Second quarter

- (7:21) UTSA – Patrick Overmyer 7-yard pass from Owen McCown, Michael Petro kick (Drive: 14 plays, 81 yards, 7:46; UTSA 14–3)

Third quarter

- (9:03) TEM – JoJo Bermudez 8-yard pass from Evan Simon, Carl Hardin kick (Drive: 10 plays, 75 yards, 5:57; UTSA 14–10)
- (7:24) TEM – Hunter Smith 54-yard run, Carl Hardin kick (Drive: 1 play, 54 yards, 0:09; Temple 17–14)
- (5:28) UTSA – Devin McCuin 18-yard pass from Owen McCown, Michael Petro kick (Drive: 5 plays, 75 yards, 1:56; UTSA 21–17)
- (1:30) TEM – Peter Clarke 15-yard pass from Evan Simon, Carl Hardin kick (Drive: 2 plays, 38 yards, 0:29; Temple 24–21)

Fourth quarter

- (1:56) TEM – Carl Hardin 36-yard field goal (Drive: 7 plays, 13 yards, 1:28; Temple 27–21)

Statistics	UTSA	TEM
First downs	19	15
Plays–yards	67–304	57–309
Rushes–yards	30–70	32–128
Passing yards	234	181
Passing: comp–att–int	25–37–2	16–25–0
Turnovers	2	0
Time of possession	32:19	27:41

Team	Category	Player	Statistics
UTSA	Passing	Owen McCown	25/37, 234 yards, 2 TD, 2 INT
UTSA	Rushing	Will Henderson III	10 carries, 42 yards
UTSA	Receiving	AJ Wilson	3 receptions, 67 yards
Temple	Passing	Evan Simon	16/25, 181 yards, 2 TD
Temple	Rushing	Hunter Smith	8 carries, 74 yards, TD
Temple	Receiving	Peter Clarke	4 receptions, 82 yards, TD

=== Rice ===
Rice Owls (3–3) at UTSA Roadrunners (2–3) – Game summary

Quarter	1	2	3	4	Total
Owls	3	7	0	3	13
Roadrunners	21	17	23	0	61

at Alamodome • San Antonio, TX

- Date: October 11
- Game time: 6:30 p.m. CDT
- Game weather: None (played indoors)
- Game attendance: 22,058
- Referee: Reid Jackson
- TV announcers (ESPNU): Courtney Lyle (play-by-play) and Rene Ingoglia (analyst)

Game information

First quarter

- (12:47) UTSA – Robert Henry Jr. 1-yard run, Michael Petro kick (Drive: 5 plays, 75 yards, 2:13; UTSA 7–0)
- (7:53) RICE – Enock Gota 36-yard field goal (Drive: 9 plays, 57 yards, 4:54; UTSA 7–3)
- (4:14) UTSA – Devin McCuin 2-yard pass from Owen McCown, Michael Petro kick (Drive: 8 plays, 75 yards, 3:39; UTSA 14–3)
- (0:54) UTSA – AJ Wilson 20-yard pass from Owen McCown, Michael Petro kick (Drive: 4 plays, 80 yards, 1:56; UTSA 21–3)

Second quarter

- (11:39) UTSA – DJ Allen Jr. 43-yard pass from Owen McCown, Michael Petro kick (Drive: 2 plays, 41 yards, 0:50; UTSA 28–3)
- (4:57) UTSA – Michael Petro 45-yard field goal (Drive: 9 plays, 17 yards, 4:33; UTSA 31–3)
- (2:14) UTSA – Will Henderson III 43-yard run, Michael Petro kick (Drive: 4 plays, 55 yards, 1:17; UTSA 38–3)
- (1:15) RICE – Daelen Alexander 3-yard run, Enock Gota kick (Drive: 6 plays, 75 yards, 1:00; UTSA 38–10)

Third quarter

- (14:16) UTSA – Kendrick Blackshire 17-yard interception return, Michael Petro kick (UTSA 45–10)
- (11:45) UTSA – Shad Banks Jr. 41-yard fumble recovery, Michael Petro kick (UTSA 52–10)
- (4:15) UTSA – Team safety (UTSA 54–10)
- (4:00) UTSA – Will Henderson III 57-yard run, Michael Petro kick (Drive: 1 play, 57 yards, 0:09; UTSA 61–10)

Fourth quarter

- (9:41) RICE – Chase Allen 45-yard field goal (Drive: 10 plays, 55 yards, 5:51; UTSA 61–13)

Statistics	RICE	UTSA
First downs	12	21
Plays–yards	69–269	59–437
Rushes–yards	50–190	34–191
Passing yards	79	246
Passing: comp–att–int	10–19–1	16–25–0
Turnovers	2	0
Time of possession	32:35	27:25

Team	Category	Player	Statistics
Rice	Passing	Chase Jenkins	1/3, 33 yards
Rice	Rushing	Daelen Alexander	12 carries, 129 yards, TD
Rice	Receiving	Drayden Dickmann	2 receptions, 33 yards
UTSA	Passing	Owen McCown	15/21, 236 yards, 3 TD
UTSA	Rushing	Will Henderson III	5 carries, 115 yards, 2 TD
UTSA	Receiving	AJ Wilson	2 receptions, 77 yards, TD

=== at North Texas ===
UTSA Roadrunners (3–3) at North Texas Mean Green (5–1) – Game summary

Quarter	1	2	3	4	Total
Roadrunners	7	7	3	0	17
Mean Green	17	7	21	10	55

at DATCU Stadium • Denton, TX

- Date: October 18
- Game time: 3:05 pm CDT
- Game weather: Rain • Temperature: 75 °F (24 °C)
- Game attendance: 25,053
- Referee: Tim Rich
- TV announcers (ESPN+): James Westling (play-by-play), Leger Douzable (analyst) and Maria Trivelpiece (sideline)

Game information

First quarter

- (13:30) UTSA – Houston Thomas 3-yard pass from Owen McOwen, Michael Petro kick (Drive: 3 plays, 75 yards, 1:30; UTSA 7–0)
- (7:31) UNT – Kali Nguma 28-yard field goal (Drive: 14 plays, 63 yards, 5:53; UTSA 7–3)
- (3:11) UNT – Wyatt Young 20-yard pass from Drew Mestemaker, Kali Nguma kick (Drive: 7 plays, 69 yards, 2:45; North Texas 10–7)
- (0:00) UNT – Wyatt Young 11-yard pass from Drew Mestemaker, Kali Nguma kick (Drive: 5 plays, 73 yards, 1:42; North Texas 17–7)

Second quarter

- (5:22) UTSA – Robert Henry 3-yard run, Michael Petro kick (Drive: 3 plays, 50 yards, 1:14; North Texas 17–14)
- (0:09) UNT – Kiefer Sibley 18-yard run, Kali Nguma kick (Drive: 13 plays, 76 yards, 2:03; North Texas 24–14)

Third quarter

- (11:30) UNT – Cameron Dorner 15-yard pass from Drew Mestemaker, Kali Nguma kick (Drive: 8 plays, 75 yards, 3:30; North Texas 31–14)
- (9:58) UNT – Drew Mestemaker 1-yard run, Kali Nguma kick (Drive: 3 plays, 19 yards, 1:21; North Texas 38–14)
- (2:57) UTSA – Michael Petro 29-yard field goal (Drive: 12 plays, 62 yards, 4:31; North Texas 38–17)
- (0:55) UNT – Wyatt Young 42-yard pass from Drew Mestemaker, Kali Nguma kick (Drive: 4 plays, 80 yards, 1:58; North Texas 45–17)

Fourth quarter

- (13:24) UNT – Kali Nguma 19-yard field goal (Drive: 6 plays, 13 yards, 2:21; North Texas 48–17)
- (6:01) UNT – Terrence Lewis 37-yard pass from Chris Jimerson Jr., Kali Nguma kick (Drive: 5 plays, 71 yards, 3:12; North Texas 55–17)

Statistics	UTSA	UNT
First downs	14	34
Plays–yards	57−329	81−584
Rushes–yards	32–214	44–270
Passing yards	115	314
Passing: comp–att–int	15–25–0	23–37–0
Turnovers	3	0
Time of possession	26:21	33:39

Team	Category	Player	Statistics
UTSA	Passing	Owen McCown	11/20, 84 yards, TD
UTSA	Rushing	Robert Henry Jr.	12 carries, 138 yards, TD
UTSA	Receiving	AJ Wilson	4 catches, 35 yards
North Texas	Passing	Drew Mestemaker	22/35, 227 yards, 4 TD
North Texas	Rushing	Caleb Hawkins	18 carries, 133 yards
North Texas	Receiving	Wyatt Young	6 catches, 102 yards, 3 TD

=== Tulane ===
Tulane Green Wave (6–1) at UTSA Roadrunners (3–4) – Game summary

Quarter	1	2	3	4	Total
Green Wave	6	6	7	7	26
Roadrunners	10	21	7	10	48

at Alamodome • San Antonio, TX

- Date: October 30
- Game time: 6:30 PM CDT
- Game weather: None (played indoors)
- Game attendance: 16,715
- Referee: Kevin Randall
- TV announcers (ESPN): Matt Barrie (play-by-play), Tom Luginbill (analyst), and Harry Lyles Jr. (sideline)

Game information

First quarter

- (11:37) TULN – Jake Retzlaff 1-yard run (Drive: 7 plays, 75 yards, 3:23; Tulane 6–0)
- (9:50) UTSA – David Amador II 2-yard pass from Owen McCown, Michael Petro kick (Drive: 5 plays, 75 yards, 1:47; UTSA 7–6)
- (5:06) UTSA – Michael Petro 34-yard field goal (Drive: 6 plays, 27 yards, 3:23; UTSA 10–6)

Second quarter

- (12:10) UTSA – Devin McCuin 6-yard pass from Owen McCown, Michael Petro kick (Drive: 8 plays, 61 yards, 3:43; UTSA 17–6)
- (3:37) UTSA – Devin McCuin 21-yard pass from Owen McCown, Michael Petro kick (Drive: 4 plays, 62 yards, 2:15; UTSA 24–6)
- (0:45) UTSA – David Amador II 14-yard pass from Owen McCown, Michael Petro kick (Drive: 7 plays, 71 yards, 2:11; UTSA 31–6)
- (0:07) TULN – Zycarl Lewis Jr. 10-yard pass from Jake Retzlaff (Drive: 6 plays, 68 yards, 0:33; UTSA 31–12)

Third quarter

- (10:08) UTSA – Will Henderson III 16-yard pass from Owen McCown, Michael Petro kick (Drive: 8 plays, 75 yards, 4:52; UTSA 38–12)
- (3:26) TULN – Omari Hayes 42-yard pass from Jimmy Calloway, Patrick Durkin kick (Drive: 5 plays, 72 yards, 2:27; UTSA 38–19)

Fourth quarter

- (14:44) UTSA – Michael Petro 43-yard feild goal (Drive: 8 plays, 37 yards, 3:41; UTSA 41–19)
- (7:10) TULN – Tre Shackelford 15-yard pass from Brendan Sullivan, Patrick Durkin kick (Drive: 4 plays, 93 yards, 1:34; UTSA 41–26)
- (1:40) UTSA – Will Henderson III 17-yard pass from Owen McCown, Michael Petro kick (Drive: 10 plays, 75 yards, 5:30; UTSA 48–26)

Statistics	TULN	UTSA
First downs	24	28
Plays–yards	61–434	69–523
Rushes–yards	25–135	35–132
Passing yards	299	391
Passing: comp–att–int	21–36–3	32–34–0
Turnovers	4	0
Time of possession	23:05	36:55

Team	Category	Player	Statistics
Tulane	Passing	Jake Retzlaff	14/28, 194 yards, TD, 2 INT
Tulane	Rushing	Jake Retzlaff	7 carries, 63 yards, TD
Tulane	Receiving	Omari Hayes	3 receptions, 69 yards, TD
UTSA	Passing	Owen McCown	31/33, 370 yards, 4 TD
UTSA	Rushing	Robert Henry	16 carries, 87 yards
UTSA	Receiving	David Amador II	10 receptions, 113 yards, 2 TD

=== at South Florida ===
UTSA Roadrunners (4–4) at South Florida Bulls (6–2) – Game summary

Quarter	1	2	3	4	Total
Roadrunners	3	7	3	10	23
Bulls	14	31	10	0	55

at Raymond James Stadium • Tampa, FL

- Date: November 6
- Game time: 6:30 PM CST
- Game weather: Cloudy • Temperature: 72 °F (22 °C) • Wind: NE at 2 miles per hour (3.2 km/h)
- Game attendance: 27,437
- Referee: Edwin Lee
- TV announcers (ESPN): Matt Barrie (play-by-play), Tom Luginbill (analyst) and Harry Lyles Jr. (sideline)

Game information

First quarter

- (14:52) USF – Tavin Ward 40-yard interception, Nico Gramatica kick (South Florida 7–0)
- (7:06) USF – Fred Gaskin 85-yard fumble recovery, Nico Gramatica kick (South Florida 14–0)
- (2:07) UTSA – Michael Petro 33-yard field goal (Drive: 7 plays, 12 yards, 2:17; South Florida 14–3)

Second quarter

- (14:55) USF – Byrum Brown 13-yard run, Nico Gramatica kick (Drive: 6 plays, 65 yards, 2:12; South Florida 21–3)
- (13:46) UTSA – Patrick Overmyer 45-yard pass from Owen McCown, Michael Petro kick (Drive: 3 plays, 75 yards, 1:09; South Florida 21–10)
- (12:21) USF – Keshaun Singleton 16-yard pass from Byrum Brown, Nico Gramatica kick (Drive: 5 plays, 75 yards, 1:25; South Florida 28–10)
- (10:15) USF – Nykahi Davenport 59-yard run, Nico Gramatica kick (Drive: 2 plays, 65 yards, 0:32; South Florida 35–10)
- (5:35) USF – Keshaun Singleton 16-yard pass from Byrum Brown, Nico Gramatica kick (Drive: 5 plays, 77 yards, 1:30; South Florida 42–10)
- (0:00) USF – Nico Gramatica 40-yard field goal (Drive: 6 plays, 58 yards, 1:46; South Florida 45–10)

Third quarter

- (11:56) USF – Nykahi Davenport 7-yard run, Nico Gramatica kick (Drive: 8 plays, 75 yards, 3:04; South Florida 52–10)
- (5:09) UTSA – Michael Petro 39-yard field goal (Drive: 9 plays, 48 yards, 4:45; South Florida 52–13)
- (2:28) USF – Nico Gramatica 51-yard field goal (Drive: 7 plays, 42 yards, 2:41; South Florida 55–13)

Fourth quarter

- (8:17) UTSA – Mekhi Anderson 19-yard pass from Brandon Tennison, Michael Petro kick (Drive: 15 plays, 55 yards, 6:36; South Florida 55–20)
- (2:46) UTSA – Michael Petro 27-yard field goal (Drive: 9 plays, 35 yards, 3:17; South Florida 55–23)

Statistics	UTSA	USF
First downs	25	20
Plays–yards	82–381	50–471
Rushes–yards	38–72	32–238
Passing yards	309	233
Passing: comp–att–int	29–44–1	16–18–0
Turnovers	2	1
Time of possession	39:47	20:13

Team	Category	Player	Statistics
UTSA	Passing	Owen McCown	16/23, 200 yards, TD, INT
UTSA	Rushing	Robert Henry	10 carries, 27 yards
UTSA	Receiving	Houston Thomas	7 receptions, 77 yards
South Florida	Passing	Byrum Brown	14/15, 239 yards, 2 TD
South Florida	Rushing	Byrum Brown	9 carries, 109 yards, TD
South Florida	Receiving	Keshaun Singleton	4 receptions, 122 yards, 2 TD

=== at Charlotte ===
UTSA Roadrunners (4–5) at Charlotte 49ers (1–8) – Game summary

Quarter	1	2	3	4	Total
Roadrunners	7	-0	7	14	28
49ers	0	0	0	7	7

at Jerry Richardson Stadium • Charlotte, NC

- Date: November 15
- Game time: 11:00 a.m. CST
- Game weather: Sunny • Temperature: 71 °F (22 °C) • Wind: NE at 8 miles per hour (13 km/h)
- Game attendance: 9,831
- Referee: Matt Overton
- TV announcers (ESPN+): Eric Rothman (play-by-play), Reggie Walker (analyst), and Maria Trivelpiece (sideline)

Game information

First quarter

- (8:34) UTSA – Devin McCuin 45-yard pass from Owen McCown, Michael Petro kick (Drive: 7 plays, 85 yards, 2:08; UTSA 7–0)

Second quarter

- No scoring plays

Third quarter

- (13:22) UTSA – Will Henderson III 59-yard run, Michael Petro kick (Drive: 5 plays, 80 yards, 2:02; UTSA 14–0)

Fourth quarter

- (9:53) UTSA – David Amador II 7-yard pass from Owen McCown, Michael Petro kick (Drive: 6 plays, 52 yards, 2:28; UTSA 21–0)
- (9:40) CLT – Derrick Eley 88-yard kickoff return, Liam Boyd kick (UTSA 21–7)
- (5:46) UTSA – Owen McCown 2-yard run, Michael Petro kick (Drive: 7 plays, 65 yards, 3:54; UTSA 28–7)

Statistics	UTSA	CLT
First downs	29	13
Plays–yards	75–521	58–197
Rushes–yards	38–215	30–51
Passing yards	306	146
Passing: comp–att–int	24–37–1	16–28–1
Turnovers	2	1
Time of possession	31:14	28:46

Team	Category	Player	Statistics
UTSA	Passing	Owen McCown	24/37, 306 yards, 2 TD, INT
UTSA	Rushing	Will Henderson III	19 carries, 185 yards, TD
UTSA	Receiving	Devin McCuin	7 receptions, 100 yards, TD
Charlotte	Passing	Grayson Loftis	13/24, 100 yards
Charlotte	Rushing	Cameren Smith	9 carries, 37 yards
Charlotte	Receiving	Javen Nicholas	6 receptions, 45 yards

=== East Carolina ===
East Carolina Pirates (7-3) at UTSA Roadrunners (5-5) – Game summary

Quarter	1	2	3	4	Total
Pirates	0	3	7	14	24
Roadrunners	14	20	10	14	58

at Alamodome • San Antonio, TX

- Date: November 22
- Game time: 2:30 p.m. CST
- Game weather: None (played indoors)
- Game attendance: 18,573
- Referee: Tim Rich
- TV announcers (ESPN+): Ted Emrich (play-by-play) and Taylor McHargue (analyst)

Game information

First quarter

- UTSA – AJ Wilson 11-yard pass from Owen McCown (Michael Petro kick), 10:18. Roadrunners 7–0. Drive: 7 plays, 70 yards, 3:02.
- UTSA – Houston Thomas 5-yard pass from Owen McCown (Michael Petro kick), 5:08. Roadrunners 14–0. Drive: 10 plays, 78 yards, 3:49.

Second quarter

- UTSA – David Amador II 45-yard pass from Owen McCown (Michael Petro kick), 13:56. Roadrunners 21–0. Drive: 3 plays, 59 yards, 1:04.
- UTSA – A'Marion Peterson 8-yard run (Michael Petro kick), 9:31. Roadrunners 28–0. Drive: 6 plays, 49 yards, 3:36.
- UTSA – Michael Petro 25-yard field goal, 3:47. Roadrunners 31–0. Drive: 9 plays, 50 yards, 4:00.
- ECU – Nick Mazzie 32-yard field goal, 0:44. Roadrunners 31–3. Drive: 11 plays, 60 yards, 3:03.
- UTSA – Michael Petro 37-yard field goal, 0:12. Roadrunners 34–3. Drive: 4 plays, 45 yards, 0:32.

Third quarter

- UTSA – DJ Allen Jr. 4-yard pass from Owen McCown (Michael Petro kick), 7:07. Roadrunners 41–3. Drive: 13 plays, 75 yards, 7:53.
- UTSA – Michael Petro 37-yard field goal, 1:59. Roadrunners 44–3. Drive: 8 plays, 19 yards, 4:06.
- ECU – Anthony Smith 50-yard pass from Katin Houser (Nick Mazzie kick), 1:15. Roadrunners 44–10. Drive: 3 plays, 75 yards, 0:44.

Fourth quarter

- UTSA – Jaren Randle 12-yard pass from Owen McCown (Michael Petro kick), 14:53. Roadrunners 51–10. Drive: 3 plays, 46 yards, 1:21.
- ECU – Marlon Gunn Jr. 50-yard run (Katin Houser–Rion Roseborough pass), 12:58. Roadrunners 51–18. Drive: 5 plays, 74 yards, 1:55.
- UTSA – Shad Banks Jr. 21-yard interception return (Michael Petro kick), 10:41. Roadrunners 58–18.
- ECU – Jayvontay Conner 1-yard pass from Katin Houser (pass failed), 7:28. Roadrunners 58–24. Drive: 9 plays, 71 yards, 3:05.

Statistics	ECU	UTSA
First downs	15	27
Plays–yards	65–401	72–458
Rushes–yards	32–158	39–210
Passing yards	243	248
Passing: comp–att–int	19–33–1	24–33–0
Turnovers	3	0
Time of possession	22:31	37:29

Team	Category	Player	Statistics
East Carolina	Passing	Katin Houser	18/32, 241 yards, 2 TD, INT
East Carolina	Rushing	Marlon Gunn Jr.	5 carries, 62 yards, TD
East Carolina	Receiving	Anthony Smith	8 receptions, 143 yards, TD
UTSA	Passing	Owen McCown	24/33, 248 yards, 5 TD
UTSA	Rushing	Will Henderson III	19 carries, 146 yards
UTSA	Receiving	David Amador II	5 receptions, 75 yards, TD

=== Army ===
Army Black Knights (5-5) at UTSA Roadrunners (6-5) – Game summary

Quarter	1	2	3	4	Total
Black Knights	0	17	3	7	27
Roadrunners	7	3	0	14	24

at Alamodome • San Antonio, Texas

- Date: November 29
- Game time: 2:30 p.m.
- Game weather: None (played indoors)
- Game attendance: 22,620
- Referee: Kevin Randall
- TV announcers (ESPN+): Ted Emrich (play-by-play), LaDarrin McLane (analyst) and Natalie Kalibat (sideline)

Game information

First quarter

- (7:43) UTSA – Patrick Overmyer 4-yard pass from David Amador II, Michael Petro kick (Drive: 9 plays, 81 yards, 5:06; UTSA 7–0)

Second quarter

- (14:15) UTSA – Michael Petro 32-yard field goal (Drive: 11 plays, 31 yards, 5:14; UTSA 10–0)
- (13:22) ARMY – Noah Short 81-yard run, Dawson Jones kick (Drive: 2 plays, 83 yards, 0:48; UTSA 10–7)
- (2:59) ARMY – Dawson Jones 27-yard field goal (Drive: 14 plays, 87 yards, 8:02; Tied 10–10)
- (0:46) ARMY – Jaydan Mayes 73-yard interception return, Dawson Jones kick (Army 17–10)

Third quarter

- (4:27) ARMY – Dawson Jones 37-yard field goal (Drive: 14 plays, 37 yards, 7:42; Army 20–10)

Fourth quarter

- (14:55) UTSA – Patrick Overmyer 8-yard pass from Owen McCown, Michael Petro kick (Drive: 5 plays, 59 yards, 2:14; Army 20–17)
- (9:10) UTSA – Jamel Hardy Jr. 7-yard pass from Owen McCown, Michael Petro kick (Drive: 7 plays, 65 yards, 3:23; UTSA 24–20)
- (2:49) ARMY – Parker Poloskey 4-yard pass from Cale Hellums, Dawson Jones kick (Drive: 13 plays, 75 yards, 6:21; Army 27–24)

Statistics	ARMY	UTSA
First downs	16	18
Plays–yards	61–303	66–386
Rushes–yards	50–233	24–116
Passing yards	70	270
Passing: comp–att–int	5–11–0	28–42–1
Turnovers	0	1
Time of possession	33:07	26:53

Team	Category	Player	Statistics
Army	Passing	Cale Hellums	4/10, 38 yards, TD
Army	Rushing	Noah Short	14 carries, 127 yards, TD
Army	Receiving	Brady Anderson	1 reception, 32 yards
UTSA	Passing	Owen McCown	27/40, 266 yards, 2 TD, INT
UTSA	Rushing	Robert Henry Jr.	13 carries, 62 yards
UTSA	Receiving	Devin McCuin	7 receptions, 86 yards

=== vs. FIU (First Responder Bowl) ===
2025 SERVPRO First Responder Bowl
FIU Panthers (7-5) vs. UTSA Roadrunners (6-6) – Game summary

Quarter	1	2	3	4	Total
Panthers	14	0	6	0	20
Roadrunners	14	17	9	17	57

at Gerald J. Ford Stadium • Dallas, TX

- Date: December 26
- Game time: 7:00 p.m. CST
- Game weather: Clear • Temperature: 82 °F (28 °C) • Wind: SSW at 5 mph (8.0 km/h)
- Game attendance: 8,671
- Referee: Steve Robinson
- TV announcers (ESPN): Anish Shroff (play-by-play), Andre Ware (analyst) and Paul Carcaterra (sideline)

Game information

First quarter

- FIU – Kyle McNeal 19-yard pass from Joe Pesansky (Noah Grant kick), 12:17. Panthers 7–0. Drive: 6 plays, 54 yards, 2:37.
- FIU – Maguire Anderson 97-yard punt return (Noah Grant kick), 9:26. Panthers 14–0.
- UTSA – Will Henderson III 2-yard run (Michael Petro kick), 6:36. Panthers 14–7. Drive: 6 plays, 75 yards, 2:50.
- UTSA – Will Henderson III 40-yard pass from Owen McCown (Michael Petro kick), 4:15. Tied 14–14. Drive: 3 plays, 52 yards, 1:18.

Second quarter

- UTSA – Michael Petro 37-yard field goal, 14:55. Roadrunners 17–14. Drive: 7 plays, 39 yards, 2:43.
- UTSA – Devin McCuin 23-yard pass from Owen McCown (Michael Petro kick), 9:42. Roadrunners 24–14. Drive: 9 plays, 67 yards, 3:32.
- UTSA – A'Marion Peterson 10-yard run (Michael Petro kick), 1:17. Roadrunners 31–14. Drive: 11 plays, 66 yards, 3:57.

Third quarter

- UTSA – Will Henderson III 5-yard run (Michael Petro kick), 8:25. Roadrunners 38–14. Drive: 6 plays, 47 yards, 2:32.
- FIU – Dallas Payne 22-yard pass from Joe Pesansky (pass failed), 4:13. Roadrunners 38–20. Drive: 10 plays, 75 yards, 4:12.
- UTSA – Ahamad Chapman Defensive PAT Conversion, 4:13. Roadrunners 40–20.

Fourth quarter

- UTSA – Patrick Overmyer 34-yard pass from Owen McCown (Michael Petro kick), 14:20. Roadrunners 47–20. Drive: 3 plays, 51 yards, 1:25.
- UTSA – Michael Petro 36-yard field goal, 6:02. Roadrunners 50–20. Drive: 5 plays, 32 yards, 1:53.
- UTSA – Bryson Donnell 12-yard run (Jaffer Murphy kick), 1:55. Roadrunners 57–20. Drive: 6 plays, 30 yards, 2:32.

Statistics	FIU	UTSA
First downs	22	25
Plays–yards	78–255	71–481
Rushes–yards	29–79	40–186
Passing yards	176	295
Passing: Comp–Att–Int	21–49–2	18–31–0
Turnovers	2	0
Time of possession	28:54	31:06

Team	Category	Player	Statistics
FIU	Passing	Joe Pesansky	11/31, 102 yards, 2 TD, INT
FIU	Rushing	Kejon Owens	8 carries, 36 yards
FIU	Receiving	Jojo Stone	4 receptions, 28 yards
UTSA	Passing	Owen McCown	18/28, 295 yards, 3 TD
UTSA	Rushing	Will Henderson III	14 carries, 59 yards, 2 TD
UTSA	Receiving	Devin McCuin	6 receptions, 73 yards, TD

== Roster ==
2025 UTSA Roadrunners football team roster
Players
Coaches
Offense

Pos.	#	Name	Class
TE	0	Houston Thomas	Jr
WR	1	Devin McCuin	Jr
QB	2	Owen McCown	Jr
RB	3	Robert Henry Jr.	Sr
TE	5	Dan Dishman	Sr
WR	8	David Amador II	So
TE	9	Patrick Overmyer	So
QB	10	Noah Lugo	Fr
WR	11	Jaren Randle	Sr
QB	12	Max Gerlich	Fr

Defense

Pos.	#	Name	Class
LB	0	Shad Banks Jr.	Sr
DL	1	Tai Leonard	Jr
LB	2	Owen Pewee	Jr
CB	3	Davin Martin	So
LB	4	Cameron Cooper	Jr
S	7	Jimmy Wyrick	So
LB	9	Kendrick Blackshire	Sr
DL	10	Chidera Otutu	So
S	11	Cam Upshaw Jr.	So
LB	12	Marcellus Wilkerson	Jr

Special teams

Pos.	#	Name	Class
P	20	Caile Hogan	Sr

Head coach

- Jeff Traylor

Coordinators/assistant coaches

- Jess Loepp –Defensive Coordinator/S
- Justin Burke -Offensive Coordinator/QB
- Kurt Traylor -Run Game Coordinator/Oline
- Nick Graham -Assistant Head Coach/CB
- Joe Price III -Associate Head Coach/Pass Game Coordinator/WR

Legend

- (C) Team captain
- (S) Suspended
- (I) Ineligible
- Injured
- Redshirt

Roster
Last update: 12 Aug 2025

=== Transfers ===
Over the offseason, UTSA lost 13 players through the NCAA transfer portal. Eleven are currently committed while the other is still actively pursuing new schools. Additionally UTSA gained 14 commitments via the portal

==== Outgoing ====
Player	Position	Destination
Walker Baty	OL	Central Arkansas
Martavius French	LB	Colorado
Ronald Triplette	EDGE	Georgia Tech
Nick Booker-Brown	DL	Norfolk State
Tate Sandell	PK	Oklahoma
Chase Allen	K	Rice
Jace Wilson	WR	Sacramento State
Kevorian Barnes	RB	TCU
Rocko Griffin	RB	UMass
Denver Harris	CB	UNLV
Eddie Lee Marburger	QB	UT Rio Grande Valley
Jackson Gilkey	QB	Weber State
Jimmori Robinson	EDGE	West Virginia
CJ James	OL	Unknown

==== Incoming ====
Player	Position	Previous school
Kaian Roberts-Day	EDGE	Baylor
Darrell Jones	OL	Bowie State
Noah Lugo	QB	BYU
Brandon Tucker	LB	East Texas A&M
Trevor Timmons	OL	Georgia State
AJ Wilson	WR	Houston Christian
DJ Williams	OL	Louisiana
Cameron Upshaw Jr.	S	Memphis
Jaelen Smith	WR	Michigan State
KK Meier	S	Nevada
Isaac Hatfield	LB	Northern Illinois
Shad Banks Jr.	LB	TCU
Cameron Blaylock	DT	Tennessee State
Jaylan Jones	DL	UT Rio Grande Valley
