= 2025 Rice Owls football team =

American college football season

2025 Rice Owls football

Armed Forces Bowl, L 10–41 vs. Texas State
- Conference: American Conference
- Record: 5–8 (2–6 American)
- Head coach: Scott Abell (1st season)
- Offensive coordinator: Vince Munch (1st season)
- Offensive scheme: Spread option
- Defensive coordinator: Jon Kay (1st season)
- Base defense: Multiple 3–4
- Home stadium: Rice Stadium

2025 American Conference football standings
	Conf.			Overall
Team	W		L	W		L
No. 18 Tulane y$^	7	–	1	11	–	3
No. 24 North Texas y	7	–	1	12	–	2
No. 23 Navy	7	–	1	11	–	2
South Florida	6	–	2	9	–	4
East Carolina	6	–	2	9	–	4
Memphis	4	–	4	8	–	5
Army	4	–	4	7	–	6
UTSA	4	–	4	7	–	6
Temple	3	–	5	5	–	7
Florida Atlantic	3	–	5	4	–	8
Rice	2	–	6	5	–	8
UAB	2	–	6	4	–	8
Tulsa	1	–	7	4	–	8
Charlotte	0	–	8	1	–	11
Championship: Tulane 34, North Texas 21
^ – College Football Playoff participant; $ – Conference champion; y – Championship game participant; Rankings from AP Poll

The 2025 Rice Owls football team represented Rice University as a member of the American Conference during the 2025 NCAA Division I FBS football season. Led by first-year Scott Abell, the Owls played home games at Rice Stadium in Houston.

Rice completed their regular season with a 5–7 record. The Owls were not bowl eligible, but received a bid to the Armed Forces Bowl due to some bowl-eligible teams (such as Notre Dame, Iowa State, and Kansas State) declining bids.

== Schedule ==
The American Athletic Conference (subsequently renamed as the American Conference) announced the 2025 football conference opponents for the Owls on August 15, 2024.

Date	Time	Opponent	Site	TV	Result	Attendance
August 30, 2025	7:00 p.m.	at Louisiana*	Cajun Field; Lafayette, LA	ESPN+	W 14–12	22,148
September 6	6:00 p.m.	Houston*	Rice Stadium; Houston, TX (rivalry)	ESPN+	L 9–35	30,116
September 13	6:00 p.m.	Prairie View A&M*	Rice Stadium; Houston, TX	ESPN+	W 38–17	22,260
September 18	6:30 p.m.	at Charlotte	Jerry Richardson Stadium; Charlotte, NC	ESPN	W 28–17	13,397
September 27	2:30 p.m.	at Navy	Navy–Marine Corps Memorial Stadium; Annapolis, MD	CBSSN	L 13–21	28,873
October 4	6:00 p.m.	Florida Atlantic	Rice Stadium; Houston, TX	ESPN+	L 21–27	22,999
October 11	6:30 p.m.	at UTSA	Alamodome; San Antonio, TX	ESPNU	L 13–61	22,058
October 25	2:00 p.m.	UConn*	Rice Stadium; Houston, TX	ESPN+	W 37–34 ^{2OT}	21,122
October 31	6:00 p.m.	No. 25 Memphis	Rice Stadium; Houston, TX	ESPN2	L 14–38	20,197
November 8	1:00 p.m.	UAB^{†}	Rice Stadium; Houston, TX	ESPN+	W 24–17	22,671
November 22	6:30 p.m.	North Texas	Rice Stadium; Houston, TX	ESPNU	L 24–56	24,598
November 29	6:00 p.m.	at South Florida	Raymond James Stadium; Tampa, FL	ESPN+	L 3–52	28,813
January 2, 2026	12:00 p.m.	vs. Texas State*	Amon G. Carter Stadium; Fort Worth, TX (Armed Forces Bowl)	ESPN	L 10–41	28,243
*Non-conference game; ^{†}Homecoming; Rankings from AP (and CFP Rankings, after November 4) - Released prior to game; All times are in Central time

== Game summaries ==
=== at Louisiana ===
Rice Owls (0–0) at Louisiana Ragin' Cajuns (0–0) – Game summary

Quarter	1	2	3	4	Total
Owls	0	14	0	0	14
Ragin' Cajuns	3	3	6	0	12

at Cajun Field • Lafayette, Louisiana

- Date: August 30
- Game time: 7:00 p.m. CDT
- Game weather: Cloudy • Temperature: 81 °F (27 °C) • Wind: NE at 5 miles per hour (8.0 km/h)
- Game attendance: 22,148
- Referee: Steven Robinson
- TV announcers (ESPN+): Dan McDonald (play-by-play) and Eric Mouton (analyst)

Game information

First quarter

- (6:04) LA – Tony Sterner 47-yard field goal (Drive: 10 plays, 26 yards, 4:21; Louisiana 3–0)

Second quarter

- (14:34) RICE – Quinton Jackson 1-yard run, Enock Gota kick (Drive: 13 plays, 72 yards, 6:24; Rice 7–3)
- (3:38) RICE – Aaron Turner 17-yard run, Enock Gota kick (Drive: 8 plays, 66 yards, 3:59; Rice 14–3)
- (0:26) LA – Tony Sterner 51-yard field goal (Drive: 10 plays, 41 yards, 3:12; Rice 14–6)

Third quarter

- (1:45) LA – Walker Howard 25-yard run, pass failed (Drive: 11 plays, 98 yards, 5:09; Rice 14–12)

Fourth quarter

- No scoring plays

Statistics	RICE	LA
First downs	18	16
Plays–yards	64–251	59–239
Rushes–yards	55–206	31–151
Passing yards	45	88
Passing: comp–att–int	7–9–0	10–28–1
Turnovers	0	2
Time of possession	36:24	23:36

Team	Category	Player	Statistics
Rice	Passing	Chase Jenkins	7/9, 45 yards
Rice	Rushing	Quinton Jackson	22 carries, 119 yards, TD
Rice	Receiving	Drayden Dickmann	3 receptions, 44 yards
Louisiana	Passing	Walker Howard	10/22, 88 yards, INT
Louisiana	Rushing	Bill Davis	11 carries, 58 yards
Louisiana	Receiving	Shelton Sampson Jr.	4 receptions, 59 yards

=== Houston (rivalry) ===
Houston Cougars (1–0) at Rice Owls (1–0) – Game summary

Quarter	1	2	3	4	Total
Cougars	0	7	7	21	35
Owls	0	3	0	6	9

at Rice Stadium • Houston, Texas

- Date: September 6
- Game time: 6:00 p.m. CDT
- Game weather: Cloudy • Temperature: 90 °F (32 °C) • Wind: E at 10 miles per hour (16 km/h)
- Game attendance: 30,116
- Referee: Kevin Randall
- TV announcers (ESPN+): Kyle Youmans (play-by-play), Dave Steckel (analyst) and Maria Trivelpice (sideline)

Game information

First quarter

- No scoring plays

Second quarter

- (9:20) RICE – Enock Gota 42-yard field goal (Drive: 14 plays, 47 yards, 6:27; Rice 3–0)
- (0:40) HOU – Dean Connors 54-yard run, Ethan Sanchez kick (Drive: 5 plays, 74 yards, 0:35; Houston 7–3)

Third quarter

- (6:24) HOU – Conner Weigman 9-yard run, Ethan Sanchez kick (Drive: 15 plays, 76 yards, 6:50; Houston 14–3)

Fourth quarter

- (14:53) HOU – Will James 37-yard interception return, Ethan Sanchez kick (Houston 21–3)
- (9:02) RICE – Chase Jenkins 3-yard run, pass failed (Drive: 12 plays, 75 yards, 5:51; Houston 21–9)
- (8:19) HOU – Stephon Johnson 74-yard pass from Conner Weigman, Ethan Sanchez kick (Drive: 2 plays, 75 yards, 0:43; Houston 28–9)
- (3:40) HOU – Dean Connors 42-yard run, Ethan Sanchez kick (Drive: 3 plays, 49 yards, 0:57; Houston 35–9)

Statistics	HOU	RICE
First downs	14	16
Plays–yards	60–392	66–228
Rushes–yards	38–204	53–177
Passing yards	188	51
Passing: comp–att–int	15–22–0	11–13–1
Turnovers	0	2
Time of possession	27:14	32:46

Team	Category	Player	Statistics
Houston	Passing	Conner Weigman	15/22, 188 yards, TD
Houston	Rushing	Dean Connors	13 carries, 132 yards, 2 TD
Houston	Receiving	Stephon Johnson	1 reception, 74 yards, TD
Rice	Passing	Chase Jenkins	10/12, 50 yards, INT
Rice	Rushing	Daelen Alexander	10 carries, 55 yards
Rice	Receiving	Aaron Turner	3 receptions, 24 yards

=== Prairie View A&M (FCS) ===
Prairie View A&M Panthers (FCS) (1–1) at Rice Owls (1–1) – Game summary

Quarter	1	2	3	4	Total
Panthers (FCS)	7	0	3	7	17
Owls	7	17	7	7	38

at Rice Stadium • Houston, Texas

- Date: September 13
- Game time: 6:00 p.m. CDT
- Game weather: Sunny • Temperature: 90 °F (32 °C) • Wind: SW at 5 miles per hour (8.0 km/h)
- Game attendance: 22,260
- Referee: Matt Overton
- TV announcers (ESPN+): Pete Sousa (play-by-play) and LaDarrin McLane (analyst)

Game information

First quarter

- (8:34) PV – Travon Jones 12-yard pass from Tevin Carter, Aiden Webb kick (Drive: 6 plays, 63 yards, 1:55; Prairie View A&M 7–0)
- (2:28) RICE – Chase Jenkins 3-yard run, Enock Gota kick (Drive: 12 plays, 68 yards, 6:00; Tied 7–7)

Second quarter

- (11:47) RICE – Aaron Turner 52-yard run, Enock Gota kick (Drive: 7 plays, 68 yards, 3:38; Rice 14–7)
- (4:56) RICE – Quinton Jackson 1-yard run, Enock Gota kick (Drive: 9 plays, 49 yards, 4:41; Rice 21–7)
- (0:50) RICE – Enock Gota 49-yard field goal (Drive: 11 plays, 48 yards, 2:32; Rice 24–7)

Third quarter

- (12:19) RICE – Landon Ransom-Goelz 34-yard pass from Chase Jenkins, Enock Gota kick (Drive: 5 plays, 65 yards, 2:41; Rice 31–7)
- (2:41) PV – Aiden Webb 28-yard field goal (Drive: 7 plays, 52 yards, 2:46; Rice 31–10)

Fourth quarter

- (5:40) RICE – Tyson Thompson 22-yard pass from Drew Devillier, Chase Allen kick (Drive: 8 plays, 61 yards, 3:17; Rice 38–10)
- (1:41) PV – Tevin Carter 6-yard run, Aiden Webb kick (Drive: 13 plays, 75 yards, 3:59; Rice 38–17)

Statistics	PV	RICE
First downs	18	28
Plays–yards	60–251	79–461
Rushes–yards	32–100	60–347
Passing yards	151	114
Passing: comp–att–int	13–28–0	12–19–0
Turnovers	0	0
Time of possession	23:38	36:22

Team	Category	Player	Statistics
Prairie View A&M	Passing	Tevin Carter	12/27, 131 yards, TD
Prairie View A&M	Rushing	Tevin Carter	15 carries, 65 yards, TD
Prairie View A&M	Receiving	Jyzaiah Rockwell	6 receptions, 92 yards
Rice	Passing	Chase Jenkins	10/16, 87 yards, TD
Rice	Rushing	Chase Jenkins	21 carries, 124 yards, TD
Rice	Receiving	Landon Ransom-Goelz	3 receptions, 46 yards, TD

=== at Charlotte ===
Rice Owls (2–1) at Charlotte 49ers (1–2) – Game summary

Quarter	1	2	3	4	Total
Owls	7	7	7	7	28
49ers	3	6	0	8	17

at Jerry Richardson Stadium • Charlotte, North Carolina

- Date: September 18
- Game time: 6:30 p.m. CDT
- Game weather: Sunny • Temperature: 86 °F (30 °C) • Wind: W at 3 miles per hour (4.8 km/h)
- Game attendance: 13,397
- Referee: Reid Jackson
- TV announcers (ESPN): Matt Barrie (play-by-play), Tom Luginbill (analyst) and Harry Lyles Jr. (sideline)

Game information

First quarter

- (8:51) CLT – Liam Boyd 29-yard field goal (Drive: 12 plays, 63 yards, 6:09; Charlotte 3–0)
- (4:25) RICE – Drayden Dickmann 9-yard pass from Chase Jenkins, Enock Gota kick (Drive: 9 plays, 75 yards, 4:26; Rice 7–3)

Second quarter

- (7:55) CLT – Liam Boyd 25-yard field goal (Drive: 12 plays, 64 yards, 4:58; Rice 7–6)
- (2:23) CLT – Liam Boyd 40-yard field goal (Drive: 8 plays, 45 yards, 3:34; Charlotte 9–7)
- (1:18) RICE – Chase Jenkins 34-yard run, Enock Gota kick (Drive: 6 plays, 75 yards, 1:05; Rice 14–9)

Third quarter

- (11:33) RICE – Daelen Alexander 13-yard run, Enock Gota kick (Drive: 7 plays, 75 yards, 3:27; Rice 21–9)

Fourth quarter

- (10:31) RICE – Daelen Alexander 1-yard run, Enock Gota kick (Drive: 9 plays, 57 yards, 4:29; Rice 28–9)
- (7:27) CLT – Javen Nicholas 31-yard pass from Grayson Loftis, Javen Nicholas pass (Drive: 10 plays, 75 yards, 3:04; Rice 28–17)

Statistics	RICE	CLT
First downs	17	22
Plays–yards	58–353	76–334
Rushes–yards	46–255	32–75
Passing yards	98	259
Passing: comp–att–int	9–12–0	23–44–0
Turnovers	0	1
Time of possession	30:12	29:48

Team	Category	Player	Statistics
Rice	Passing	Chase Jenkins	8/11, 87 yards, TD
Rice	Rushing	Quinton Jackson	12 carries, 80 yards
Rice	Receiving	Drayden Dickmann	4 receptions, 39 yards, TD
Charlotte	Passing	Grayson Loftis	15/31, 186 yards, TD
Charlotte	Rushing	Rod Gainey Jr.	8 carries, 51 yards
Charlotte	Receiving	Javen Nicholas	5 receptions, 93 yards, TD

=== at Navy ===
Rice Owls (3–1) at Navy Midshipmen (3–0) – Game summary

Quarter	1	2	3	4	Total
Owls	0	0	3	10	13
Midshipmen	7	7	0	7	21

at Navy–Marine Corps Memorial Stadium • Annapolis, Maryland

- Date: September 27
- Game time: 2:30 p.m. CDT
- Game weather: Cloudy • Temperature: 75 °F (24 °C) • Wind: N at 5 miles per hour (8.0 km/h)
- Game attendance: 28,873
- Referee: Charles Lamertina
- TV announcers (CBSSN): Chris Lewis (play-by-play), Randy Cross (analyst), and Brandon Baylor (sideline reporter)

Game information

First quarter

- (7:04) NAVY – Luke Hutchison 2-yard run, Nathan Kirkwood kick (Drive: 14 plays, 75 yards, 7:56; Navy 7–0)

Second quarter

- (14:56) NAVY – Blake Horvath 8-yard run, Nathan Kirkwood kick (Drive: 3 plays, 80 yards, 1:28; Navy 14–0)

Third quarter

- (0:22) RICE – Enock Gota 35-yard field goal (Drive: 18 plays, 48 yards, 8:15; Navy 14–3)

Fourth quarter

- (10:33) NAVY – Blake Horvath 2-yard run, Nathan Kirkwood kick (Drive: 10 plays, 75 yards, 4:49; Navy 21–3)
- (7:05) RICE – Drayden Dickmann 3-yard pass from Chase Jenkins, Enock Gota kick (Drive: 7 plays, 61 yards, 3:19; Navy 21–10)
- (0:24) RICE – Enock Gota 44-yard field goal (Drive: 10 plays, 54 yards, 2:43; Navy 21–13)

Statistics	RICE	NAVY
First downs	13	19
Plays–yards	60–234	61–455
Rushes–yards	39–120	48–283
Passing yards	114	172
Passing: comp–att–int	12–21–0	8–13–1
Turnovers	0	1
Time of possession	26:31	33:29

Team	Category	Player	Statistics
Rice	Passing	Chase Jenkins	12/21, 114 yards, TD
Rice	Rushing	Quinton Jackson	15 carries, 60 yards
Rice	Receiving	Drayden Dickmann	3 receptions, 45 yards, TD
Navy	Passing	Blake Horvath	8/13, 172 yards, INT
Navy	Rushing	Blake Horvath	21 carries, 110 yards, 2 TD
Navy	Receiving	Alex Tecza	3 receptions, 53 yards

=== Florida Atlantic ===
Florida Atlantic Owls (1–3) at Rice Owls (3–2) – Game summary

Quarter	1	2	3	4	Total
Florida Atlantic Owls	14	3	7	3	27
Rice Owls	7	0	7	7	21

at Rice Stadium • Houston, Texas

- Date: October 4
- Game time: 6:00 p.m. CDT
- Game weather: Sunny • Temperature: 86 °F (30 °C) • Wind: N at 10 miles per hour (16 km/h)
- Game attendance: 22,999
- Referee: Edwin Lee
- TV announcers (ESPN+): James Westling (play-by-play), LaDarrin McLane (analyst) and Smacker Miles (sideline)

Game information

First quarter

- (13:34) RICE – Quinton Jackson 68-yard run, Enock Gota kick (Drive: 3 plays, 75 yards, 1:26; Rice 7–0)
- (11:23) FAU – Michael Kirch 30-yard pass from Caden Veltkamp, Garrison Smith kick (Drive: 6 plays, 75 yards, 2:11; Tied 7–7)
- (6:57) FAU – Asaad Waseem 38-yard pass from Caden Veltkamp, Garrison Smith kick (Drive: 6 plays, 54 yards, 1:55; Florida Atlantic 14–7)

Second quarter

- (4:36) FAU – Garrison Smith 36-yard field goal (Drive: 6 plays, 54 yards, 3:08; Florida Atlantic 17–7)

Third quarter

- (4:44) RICE – Drayden Dickmann 46-yard pass from Chase Jenkins, Enock Gota kick (Drive: 11 plays, 90 yards, 5:39; Florida Atlantic 17–14)
- (1:50) FAU – Michael Kirch 2-yard pass from Caden Veltkamp, Garrison Smith kick (Drive: 8 plays, 76 yards, 2:54; Florida Atlantic 24–14)

Fourth quarter

- (6:03) FAU – Garrison Smith 26-yard field goal (Drive: 13 plays, 76 yards, 6:33; Florida Atlantic 27–14)
- (3:19) RICE – Chase Jenkins 2-yard run, Enock Gota kick (Drive: 8 plays, 75 yards, 2:44; Florida Atlantic 27–21)

Statistics	FAU	RICE
First downs	20	18
Plays–yards	66–393	65–350
Rushes–yards	33–103	48–213
Passing yards	290	137
Passing: comp–att–int	23–33–1	12–17–0
Turnovers	2	0
Time of possession	28:46	31:14

Team	Category	Player	Statistics
Florida Atlantic	Passing	Caden Veltkamp	23/33, 290 yards, 3 TD, INT
Florida Atlantic	Rushing	Xavier Terrell	20 carries, 69 yards
Florida Atlantic	Receiving	Easton Messer	11 receptions, 110 yards
Rice	Passing	Chase Jenkins	12/17, 137 yards, TD
Rice	Rushing	Quinton Jackson	19 carries, 128 yards, TD
Rice	Receiving	Drayden Dickmann	4 receptions, 61 yards, TD

=== at UTSA ===
Rice Owls (3–3) at UTSA Roadrunners (2–3) – Game summary

Quarter	1	2	3	4	Total
Owls	3	7	0	3	13
Roadrunners	21	17	23	0	61

at Alamodome • San Antonio, Texas

- Date: October 11
- Game time: 6:30 p.m. CDT
- Game weather: None (played indoors)
- Game attendance: 22,058
- Referee: Reid Jackson
- TV announcers (ESPNU): Courtney Lyle (play-by-play) and Rene Ingoglia (analyst)

Game information

First quarter

- (12:47) UTSA – Robert Henry Jr. 1-yard run, Michael Petro kick (Drive: 5 plays, 75 yards, 2:13; UTSA 7–0)
- (7:53) RICE – Enock Gota 36-yard field goal (Drive: 9 plays, 57 yards, 4:54; UTSA 7–3)
- (4:14) UTSA – Devin McCuin 2-yard pass from Owen McCown, Michael Petro kick (Drive: 8 plays, 75 yards, 3:39; UTSA 14–3)
- (0:54) UTSA – AJ Wilson 20-yard pass from Owen McCown, Michael Petro kick (Drive: 4 plays, 80 yards, 1:56; UTSA 21–3)

Second quarter

- (11:39) UTSA – DJ Allen Jr. 43-yard pass from Owen McCown, Michael Petro kick (Drive: 2 plays, 41 yards, 0:50; UTSA 28–3)
- (4:57) UTSA – Michael Petro 45-yard field goal (Drive: 9 plays, 17 yards, 4:33; UTSA 31–3)
- (2:14) UTSA – Will Henderson III 43-yard run, Michael Petro kick (Drive: 4 plays, 55 yards, 1:17; UTSA 38–3)
- (1:15) RICE – Daelen Alexander 3-yard run, Enock Gota kick (Drive: 6 plays, 75 yards, 1:00; UTSA 38–10)

Third quarter

- (14:16) UTSA – Kendrick Blackshire 17-yard interception return, Michael Petro kick (UTSA 45–10)
- (11:45) UTSA – Shad Banks Jr. 41-yard fumble recovery, Michael Petro kick (UTSA 52–10)
- (4:15) UTSA – Team safety (UTSA 54–10)
- (4:00) UTSA – Will Henderson III 57-yard run, Michael Petro kick (Drive: 1 play, 57 yards, 0:09; UTSA 61–10)

Fourth quarter

- (9:41) RICE – Chase Allen 45-yard field goal (Drive: 10 plays, 55 yards, 5:51; UTSA 61–13)

Statistics	RICE	UTSA
First downs	12	21
Plays–yards	69–269	59–437
Rushes–yards	50–190	34–191
Passing yards	79	246
Passing: comp–att–int	10–19–1	16–25–0
Turnovers	2	0
Time of possession	32:35	27:25

Team	Category	Player	Statistics
Rice	Passing	Chase Jenkins	1/3, 33 yards
Rice	Rushing	Daelen Alexander	12 carries, 129 yards, TD
Rice	Receiving	Drayden Dickmann	2 receptions, 33 yards
UTSA	Passing	Owen McCown	15/21, 236 yards, 3 TD
UTSA	Rushing	Will Henderson III	5 carries, 115 yards, 2 TD
UTSA	Receiving	AJ Wilson	2 receptions, 77 yards, TD

=== UConn ===
UConn Huskies (5–2) at Rice Owls (3–4) – Game summary

Quarter	1	2	3	4	OT	2OT	Total
Huskies	7	14	3	0	7	3	34
Owls	3	14	0	7	7	6	37

at Rice Stadium • Houston, Texas

- Date: October 25
- Game time: 2:00 p.m. CDT
- Game weather: Cloudy • Temperature: 77 °F (25 °C) • Wind: SE at 7 miles per hour (11 km/h)
- Game attendance: 21,122
- Referee: Tim Rich
- TV announcers (ESPN+): Ted Emrich (play-by-play), Charles Arbuckle (analyst), and Smacker Miles (sideline)

Game information

First quarter

- CONN - Skyler Bell 80-yard pass from Joe Fagnano (Chris Freeman kick), 11:05. Huskies 7–0. Drive: 1 plays, 80 yards, 00:13.
- RICE - Enock Gota 38-yard field goal, 1:03. Huskies 7–3. Drive: 10 plays, 52 yards, 05:00.

Second quarter

- RICE - Quinton Jackson 73-yard run (Enock Gota kick), 11:08. Owls 10–7. Drive: 3 plays, 80 yards, 01:21.
- CONN - Cam Edwards 12-yard pass from Joe Fagnano (Chris Freeman kick), 1:48. Huskies 14–10. Drive: 13 plays, 77 yards, 04:45.
- RICE - Quinton Jackson 75-yard pass from Chase Jenkins (Enock Gota kick), 1:35. Owls 17–14. Drive: 1 plays, 75 yards, 00:13.
- CONN - Vereen, Juice 34-yard pass from Joe Fagnano (Chris Freeman kick), 0:49. Huskies 21–17. Drive: 6 plays, 75 yards, 00:46.

Third quarter

- CONN - Chris Freeman 45-yard field goal, 6:06. Huskies 24–17. Drive: 5 plays, 18 yards, 02:16.

Fourth quarter

- RICE - D'Andre Hardemann 10-yard run (Enock Gota kick), 11:46. Tied 24–24. Drive: 12 plays, 91 yards, 05:40.

First overtime

- RICE - Quinton Jackson 6-yard run (Enock Gota kick). Owls 31–24. Drive: 5 plays, 25 yards.
- CONN - Cam Edwards 5-yard run (Chris Freeman kick). Tied 31–31. Drive: 3 plays, 25 yards.

Second overtime

- CONN - Chris Freeman 41-yard field goal. Huskies 34–31. Drive: 4 plays, 3 yards.
- RICE - Quinton Jackson 23-yard run (No PAT Attempted). Owls 37–34. Drive: 2 plays, 25 yards.

Statistics	CONN	RICE
First downs	18	20
Plays–yards	74–449	78–491
Rushes–yards	26–105	56–300
Passing yards	344	191
Passing: comp–att–int	32–48–0	17–22–0
Turnovers	0	0
Time of possession	27:32	32:28

Team	Category	Player	Statistics
UConn	Passing	Joe Fagnano	32/48, 344 yards, 3 TD
UConn	Rushing	Cam Edwards	16 carries, 59 yards, TD
UConn	Receiving	Skyler Bell	8 receptions, 158 yards, TD
Rice	Passing	Chase Jenkins	17/22, 191 yards, TD
Rice	Rushing	Quinton Jackson	21 carries, 168 yards, 3 TD
Rice	Receiving	Quinton Jackson	3 receptions, 80 yards, TD

=== No. 25 Memphis ===
No. 25 Memphis Tigers (7–1) at Rice Owls (4–4) – Game summary

Quarter	1	2	3	4	Total
No. 25 Tigers	14	17	7	0	38
Owls	0	7	0	7	14

at Rice Stadium • Houston, Texas

- Date: October 31
- Game time: 6:00 PM CDT
- Game weather: Clear • Temperature: 71 °F (22 °C) • Wind: NW at 9 miles per hour (14 km/h)
- Game attendance: 20,197
- Referee: Matt Overton
- TV announcers (ESPN2): Ted Emrich (play-by-play), Dustin Fox (analyst), and Marilyn Payne (sideline)

Game information

First quarter

- (10:35) MEM – Brendon Lewis 18-yard run, Gianni Spetic kick (Drive: 5 plays, 54 yards, 2:28; Memphis 7–0)
- (2:34) MEM – Frank Peasant 2-yard run, Gianni Spetic kick (Drive: 3 plays, 7 yards, 1:16; Memphis 14–0)

Second quarter

- (12:25) MEM – Frank Peasant 1-yard run, Gianni Spetic kick (Drive: 6 plays, 51 yards, 3:07; Memphis 21–0)
- (7:54) MEM – Frank Peasant 1-yard run, Gianni Spetic kick (Drive: 6 plays, 86 yards, 2:39; Memphis 28–0)
- (2:03) RICE – Aaron Turner 12-yard pass from Chase Jenkins, Enock Gota kick (Drive: 12 plays, 78 yards, 5:49; Memphis 28–7)
- (0:00) MEM – Gianni Spetic 37-yard field goal (Drive: 9 plays, 56 yards, 2:03; Memphis 31–7)

Third quarter

- (0:49) MEM – Greg Desrosiers Jr. 2-yard run, Gianni Spetic kick (Drive: 4 plays, 27 yards, 1:09; Memphis 38–7)

Fourth quarter

- (3:28) RICE – Tyvonn Byars 1-yard run, Chase Allen kick (Drive: 12 plays, 76 yards, 6:19; Memphis 38–14)

Statistics	MEM	RICE
First downs	20	13
Plays–yards	56–355	63–212
Rushes–yards	33–130	46–112
Passing yards	225	100
Passing: comp–att–int	18–23–0	11–17–1
Turnovers	0	2
Time of possession	27:38	32:22

Team	Category	Player	Statistics
Memphis	Passing	Brendon Lewis	18/22, 225 yards
Memphis	Rushing	Brendon Lewis	12 carries, 87 yards, TD
Memphis	Receiving	Cortez Braham Jr.	3 receptions, 66 yards
Rice	Passing	Chase Jenkins	11/16, 100 yards, TD, INT
Rice	Rushing	Chase Jenkins	15 carries, 34 yards
Rice	Receiving	Tyvonn Byars	1 reception, 43 yards

=== UAB ===
UAB Blazers (3–5) at Rice Owls (4–5) – Game summary

Quarter	1	2	3	4	Total
Blazers	7	10	0	0	17
Owls	7	7	10	0	24

at Rice Stadium • Houston, Texas

- Date: November 8
- Game time: 1:00 p.m. CDT
- Game weather: Sunny • Temperature: 82 °F (28 °C) • Wind: SW at 9 miles per hour (14 km/h)
- Game attendance: 22,671
- Referee: Reid Jackson
- TV announcers (ESPN+): Shawn Kenney (play-by-play), Forrest Conoly (analyst) and Smacker Miles (sideline)

Game information

First quarter

- (11:08) UAB – Iverson Hooks 26-yard pass from Ryder Burton, Jonah Delange kick (Drive: 2 plays, 34 yards, 0:45; UAB 7–0)
- (6:23) RICE – Tyson Thompson 23-yard pass from Chase Jenkins, Enock Gota kick (Drive: 10 plays, 62 yards, 4:38; Tied 7–7)

Second quarter

- (6:23) RICE – D'Andre Hardeman Jr. 1-yard run, Enock Gota kick (Drive: 19 plays, 48 yards, 9:01; Rice 14–7)
- (2:35) UAB – Jonah Delange 20-yard field goal (Drive: 14 plays, 64 yards, 8:06; Rice 14–10)
- (0:03) UAB – Brandon Hawkins Jr. 21-yard pass from Ryder Burton, Jonah Delange kick (Drive: 7 plays, 56 yards, 0:55; UAB 17–14)

Third quarter

- (9:29) RICE – Aaron Turner 3-yard pass from Chase Jenkins, Enock Gota kick (Drive: 11 plays, 75 yards, 5:31; Rice 21–17)
- (1:00) RICE – Enock Gota 38-yard field goal (Drive: 10 plays, 43 yards, 5:02; Rice 24–17)

Fourth quarter

- No scoring plays

Statistics	UAB	RICE
First downs	18	18
Plays–yards	63–315	72–232
Rushes–yards	29–102	57–191
Passing yards	213	41
Passing: comp–att–int	18–34–0	11–15–0
Turnovers	0	1
Time of possession	25:09	34:51

Team	Category	Player	Statistics
UAB	Passing	Ryder Burton	18/34, 213 yards, 2 TD
UAB	Rushing	Jevon Jackson	15 carries, 89 yards
UAB	Receiving	Iverson Hooks	6 receptions, 89 yards, TD
Rice	Passing	Chase Jenkins	11/15, 41 yards, 2 TD
Rice	Rushing	Quinton Jackson	22 carries, 81 yards
Rice	Receiving	Tyson Thompson	3 receptions, 33 yards, TD

=== North Texas ===
North Texas Mean Green (9-1) at Rice Owls (5–5) – Game summary

Quarter	1	2	3	4	Total
Mean Green	7	21	14	14	56
Owls	14	0	7	3	24

at Rice Stadium • Houston, Texas

- Date: November 22
- Game time: 6:30 p.m. CST
- Game weather: Clear • Temperature: 73 °F (23 °C) • Wind: N at 5 miles per hour (8.0 km/h)
- Game attendance: 24,598
- Referee: Kevin Randall
- TV announcers (ESPNU): Lowell Galindo (play-by-play), Aaron Murray (analyst) and Lauren Sisler (sideline)

Game information

First quarter

- (8:56) RICE - Chase Jenkins 18-yard run, Enock Gota kick (Drive: 12 plays, 86 yards, 6:00; Rice 7-0)
- (1:42) RICE - Aaron Turner 12-yard run, Enock Gota kick (Drive: 10 plays, 71 yards, 5:56; Rice 14-0)
- (0:52) UNT - Wyatt Young 74-yard pass from Drew Mestemaker, Kali Nguma kick (Drive: 2 plays, 76 yards, 0:42; Rice 14-7)

Second quarter

- (10:26) UNT - Caleb Hawkins 4-yard run, Kali Nguma kick (Drive: 7 plays, 52 yards, 2:29; Tied 14-14)
- (6:34) UNT - Tre Williams III 56-yard pass from Drew Mestemaker, Kali Nguma kick (Drive: 6 plays, 77 yards, 2:25; North Texas 21-14)
- (3:05) UNT - Wyatt Young 84-yard pass from Drew Mestemaker, Kali Nguma kick (Drive: 1 play, 84 yards, 0:16; North Texas 28-14)

Third quarter

- (12:55) UNT - Drew Mestemaker 1-yard run, Kali Nguma kick (Drive: 5 plays, 71 yards, 2:00; North Texas 35-14)
- (3:14) UNT - Caleb Hawkins 7-yard run, Kali Nguma kick (Drive: 9 plays, 86 yards, 3:58; North Texas 42-14)
- (0:04) RICE - Aaron Turner 15-yard pass from Chase Jenkins, Enock Gota kick (Drive: 7 plays, 75 yards, 3:10; North Texas 42-21)

Fourth quarter

- (12:10) UNT - Caleb Hawkins 8-yard run, Kali Nguma kick (Drive: 7 plays, 75 yards, 2:54; North Texas 49-21)
- (5:38) RICE - Enock Gota 27-yard field goal (Drive: 13 plays, 66 yards, 6:30; North Texas 49-24)
- (3:46) UNT - Ashton Gray 11-yard run, Kali Nguma kick (Drive: 4 plays, 47 yards, 1:51; North Texas 56-24)

Statistics	UNT	RICE
First downs	25	24
Plays–yards	55–640	74–397
Rushes–yards	32–171	53–296
Passing yards	469	101
Passing: comp–att–int	19–23–0	14–21–0
Turnovers	0	0
Time of possession	22:15	37:45

Team	Category	Player	Statistics
North Texas	Passing	Drew Mestemaker	19/23, 469 yards, 3 TD
North Texas	Rushing	Caleb Hawkins	20 carries, 97 yards, 3 TD
North Texas	Receiving	Wyatt Young	8 receptions, 295 yards, 2 TD
Rice	Passing	Chase Jenkins	14/21, 101 yards, TD
Rice	Rushing	Aaron Turner	9 carries, 78 yards, TD
Rice	Receiving	Aaron Turner	8 receptions, 58 yards, TD

=== at South Florida ===
Rice Owls (5–6) at South Florida Bulls (8–3) – Game summary

Quarter	1	2	3	4	Total
Owls	0	3	0	0	3
Bulls	14	14	10	14	52

at Raymond James Stadium • Tampa, Florida

- Date: November 29
- Game time: 6:00 p.m. CST
- Game attendance: 28,813
- Referee: Matt Overton
- TV announcers (ESPN+): Eric Rothman (play-by-play), Patrick Murray Jr. (analyst), and Savanna Collins (sideline)

Game information

First quarter

- USF – Keshaun Singleton 5-yard pass from Byrum Brown (Nico Gramatica kick), 9:25. Bulls 7–0. Drive: 12 plays, 68 yards, 3:24.
- USF – Keshaun Singleton 47-yard pass from Byrum Brown (Nico Gramatica kick), 2:59. Bulls 14–0. Drive: 4 plays, 77 yards, 1:11.

Second quarter

- USF – Mudia Reuben 60-yard pass from Byrum Brown (Nico Gramatica kick), 11:21. Bulls 21–0. Drive: 6 plays, 80 yards, 1:27.
- USF – Nykahi Davenport 2-yard run (Nico Gramatica kick), 6:54. Bulls 28–0. Drive: 7 plays, 67 yards, 2:24.
- RICE – Enock Gota 44-yard field goal, 0:00. Bulls 28–3. Drive: 12 plays, 54 yards, 3:34.

Third quarter

- USF – Jeremiah Koger 7-yard pass from Byrum Brown (Nico Gramatica kick), 10:13. Bulls 35–3. Drive: 11 plays, 75 yards, 4:47.
- USF – Nico Gramatica 23-yard field goal, 1:41. Bulls 38–3. Drive: 14 plays, 80 yards, 5:16.

Fourth quarter

- USF – Byrum Brown 5-yard run (Nico Gramatica kick), 14:39. Bulls 45–3. Drive: 4 plays, 50 yards, 1:05.
- USF – Christian Helms 3-yard pass from Gaston Moore (Adam Zouagui kick), 8:33. Bulls 52–3. Drive: 9 plays, 61 yards, 3:35.

Statistics	RICE	USF
First downs	13	30
Plays–yards	58–257	77–553
Rushes–yards	40–153	49–272
Passing yards	104	281
Passing: comp–att–int	9–18–0	18–28–0
Turnovers	1	0
Time of possession	31:22	28:38

Team	Category	Player	Statistics
Rice	Passing	Drew Devillier	3/9, 65 yards
Rice	Rushing	Tyvonn Byars	6 carries, 46 yards
Rice	Receiving	Aaron Turner	7 receptions, 99 yards
South Florida	Passing	Byrum Brown	16/24, 275 yards, 4 TD
South Florida	Rushing	Byrum Brown	15 carries, 104 yards, TD
South Florida	Receiving	Keshaun Singleton	6 receptions, 125 yards, 2 TD

=== vs. Texas State (Armed Forces Bowl) ===
2026 Lockheed Martin Armed Forces Bowl
Rice Owls (5-7) vs. Texas State Bobcats (6-6) – Game summary

Quarter	1	2	3	4	Total
Owls	0	7	0	3	10
Bobcats	0	10	17	14	41

at Amon G. Carter Stadium • Fort Worth, TX

- Date: January 2, 2026
- Game time: 12:00 p.m. CST
- Game weather: Sunny • Temperature: 66 °F (19 °C) • Wind: 10 mph (16 km/h) west
- Game attendance: 28,243
- Referee: Matt Packowski (MAC)
- TV announcers (ESPN): Lowell Galindo (play-by-play), Aaron Murray (analyst) and Lauren Sisler (sideline)

Game information

First quarter

No scoring plays

Second quarter

- TXST – Brad Jackson 6-yard run (Tyler Robles kick), 10:31. Bobcats 7–0. Drive: 8 plays, 38 yards, 3:46.
- TXST – Tyler Robles 30-yard field goal, 6:17. Bobcats 10–0. Drive: 9 plays, 78 yards, 2:40.
- RICE – Aaron Turner 2-yard pass from Patrick Crayton Jr. (Enock Gota kick), 0:09. Bobcats 10–7. Drive: 6 plays, 68 yards, 1:08.

Third quarter

- TXST – Beau Sparks 69-yard pass from Brad Jackson (Tyler Robles kick), 14:07. Bobcats 17–7. Drive: 3 plays, 81 yards, 0:48.
- TXST – Chris Dawn Jr. 12-yard pass from Brad Jackson (Tyler Robles kick), 8:36. Bobcats 24–7. Drive: 2 plays, 11 yards, 0:11.
- TXST – Tyler Robles 29-yard field goal, 6:53. Bobcats 27–7. Drive: 4 plays, 7 yards, 1:35.

Fourth quarter

- TXST – Lincoln Pare 63-yard run (Tyler Robles kick), 14:41. Bobcats 34–7. Drive: 1 play, 63 yards, 0:12.
- TXST – Chris Dawn Jr. 14-yard pass from Brad Jackson (Tyler Robles kick), 9:10. Bobcats 41–7. Drive: 7 plays, 90 yards, 3:09.
- RICE – Enock Gota 28-yard field goal, 5:32. Bobcats 41–10. Drive: 9 plays, 60 yards, 3:38.

Statistics	RICE	TXST
First downs	12	24
Plays–yards	65–195	67–436
Rushes–yards	44–102	41–241
Passing yards	94	195
Passing: Comp–Att–Int	13–21–1	18–26–0
Turnovers	3	1
Time of possession	30:32	29:28

Team	Category	Player	Statistics
Rice	Passing	Patrick Crayton Jr.	4/9, 70 yards, TD, INT
Rice	Rushing	Quinton Jackson	16 carries, 78 yards
Rice	Receiving	Payton Matthews	1 reception, 54 yards
Texas State	Passing	Brad Jackson	17/24, 173 yards, 3 TD
Texas State	Rushing	Lincoln Pare	11 carries, 106 yards, TD
Texas State	Receiving	Beau Sparks	4 receptions, 87 yards, TD
