= 2025 Temple Owls football team =

American college football season

2025 Temple Owls football
- Conference: American Conference
- Record: 5–7 (3–5 American)
- Head coach: K. C. Keeler (1st season)
- Offensive coordinator: Tyler Walker (1st season)
- Offensive scheme: Spread
- Defensive coordinator: Brian Smith (1st season)
- Base defense: Multiple 3–4
- Home stadium: Lincoln Financial Field

2025 American Conference football standings
	Conf.			Overall
Team	W		L	W		L
No. 18 Tulane y$^	7	–	1	11	–	3
No. 24 North Texas y	7	–	1	12	–	2
No. 23 Navy	7	–	1	11	–	2
South Florida	6	–	2	9	–	4
East Carolina	6	–	2	9	–	4
Memphis	4	–	4	8	–	5
Army	4	–	4	7	–	6
UTSA	4	–	4	7	–	6
Temple	3	–	5	5	–	7
Florida Atlantic	3	–	5	4	–	8
Rice	2	–	6	5	–	8
UAB	2	–	6	4	–	8
Tulsa	1	–	7	4	–	8
Charlotte	0	–	8	1	–	11
Championship: Tulane 34, North Texas 21
^ – College Football Playoff participant; $ – Conference champion; y – Championship game participant; Rankings from AP Poll

The 2025 Temple Owls football team represented Temple University as member of the American Conference during the 2025 NCAA Division I FBS football season. Led by first-year head coach K. C. Keeler, the Owls played home games at Lincoln Financial Field in Philadelphia.

== Schedule ==
Date	Time	Opponent	Site	TV	Result	Attendance
August 30	3:30 p.m.	at UMass*	Warren McGuirk Alumni Stadium; Amherst, MA	ESPN+	W 42–10	11,565
September 6	2:00 p.m.	Howard*	Lincoln Financial Field; Philadelphia, PA	ESPN+	W 55–7	15,655
September 13	12:00 p.m.	No. 13 Oklahoma*	Lincoln Financial Field; Philadelphia, PA	ESPN2	L 3–42	24,927
September 20	4:30 p.m.	at No. 18 Georgia Tech*	Bobby Dodd Stadium; Atlanta, GA	The CW	L 24–45	45,123
October 4	1:00 p.m.	UTSA	Lincoln Financial Field; Philadelphia, PA	ESPN+	W 27–21	12,132
October 11	4:00 p.m.	Navy	Lincoln Financial Field; Philadelphia, PA	ESPN2	L 31–32	26,149
October 18	3:30 p.m.	at Charlotte	Jerry Richardson Stadium; Charlotte, NC	ESPN+	W 49–14	13,618
October 25	3:30 p.m.	at Tulsa	Skelly Field at H. A. Chapman Stadium; Tulsa, OK	ESPN+	W 38–37 ^{OT}	16,403
November 1	2:00 p.m.	East Carolina	Lincoln Financial Field; Philadelphia, PA	ESPN+	L 14–45	13,168
November 8	12:00 p.m.	at Army	Michie Stadium; West Point, NY	CBSSN	L 13–14	30,594
November 22	3:45 p.m.	No. 24 Tulane	Lincoln Financial Field; Philadelphia, PA	ESPNU	L 13–37	13,366
November 28	3:30 p.m.	at North Texas	DATCU Stadium; Denton, TX	ESPN	L 25–52	24,492
*Non-conference game; Rankings from AP Poll and CFP Rankings after November 4 released prior to game; All times are in Eastern time

== Game summaries ==
=== at UMass ===
Temple Owls (0–0) at UMass Minutemen (0–0) – Game summary

Quarter	1	2	3	4	Total
Owls	7	21	0	14	42
Minutemen	10	0	0	0	10

at Warren McGuirk Alumni Stadium • Amherst, Massachusetts

- Date: August 30
- Game time: 3:30 p.m. EDT
- Game weather: Sunny • Temperature: 72 °F (22 °C) • Wind: NW at 8 miles per hour (13 km/h)
- Game attendance: 11,565
- Referee: Matt Packowski
- TV announcers (ESPN+): Robert Lee (play-by-play) and Patrick Murray (analyst)

Game information

First quarter

- (11:25) MASS – Rocko Griffin 18-yard run, Derek Morris kick (Drive: 9 plays, 75 yards, 3:35; UMass 7–0)
- (5:02) TEM – Peter Clarke 21-yard pass from Evan Simon, Carl Hardin kick (Drive: 12 plays, 90 yards, 6:18; Tied 7–7)
- (1:11) MASS – Derek Morris 40-yard field goal (Drive: 9 plays, 53 yards, 3:51; UMass 10–7)

Second quarter

- (11:48) TEM – Kajiya Hollawayne 24-yard pass from Evan Simon, Carl Hardin kick (Drive: 3 plays, 41 yards, 0:40; Temple 14–10)
- (5:40) TEM – Peter Clarke 29-yard pass from Evan Simon, Carl Hardin kick (Drive: 5 plays, 99 yards, 2:08; Temple 21–10)
- (0:59) TEM – Terrez Worthy 13-yard pass from Evan Simon, Carl Hardin kick (Drive: 5 plays, 48 yards, 0:35; Temple 28–10)

Third quarter

- No scoring plays

Fourth quarter

- (12:39) TEM – Ryder Kusch 3-yard pass from Evan Simon, Carl Hardin kick (Drive: 13 plays, 80 yards, 7:09; Temple 35–10)
- (6:26) TEM – Ryder Kusch 2-yard pass from Evan Simon, Carl Hardin kick (Drive: 8 plays, 35 yards, 3:57; Temple 42–10)

Statistics	TEM	MASS
First downs	24	18
Plays–yards	66–467	62–302
Rushes–yards	37–191	22–103
Passing yards	276	199
Passing: comp–att–int	22–29–0	25–40–1
Turnovers	0	2
Time of possession	33:46	26:14

Team	Category	Player	Statistics
Temple	Passing	Evan Simon	19/25, 248 yards, 6 TD
Temple	Rushing	Jay Ducker	19 carries, 128 yards
Temple	Receiving	JoJo Bermudez	7 receptions, 87 yards
UMass	Passing	Brandon Rose	23/38, 193 yards, INT
UMass	Rushing	Rocko Griffin	10 carries, 94 yards, TD
UMass	Receiving	Jacquon Gibson	12 receptions, 132 yards

=== Howard (FCS) ===
Howard Bison (FCS) (1–0) at Temple Owls (1–0) – Game summary

Quarter	1	2	3	4	Total
Bison (FCS)	0	7	0	0	7
Owls	21	10	14	10	55

at Lincoln Financial Field • Philadelphia, Pennsylvania

- Date: September 6
- Game time: 2:00 p.m. EDT
- Game weather: Cloudy • Temperature: 88 °F (31 °C) • Wind: NE at 12 miles per hour (19 km/h)
- Game attendance: 15,655
- Referee: Matt Beck
- TV announcers (ESPN+): Shawn Kenney (play-by-play) and Jay Sonnhalter (analyst)

Game information

First quarter

- (10:04) TEM – Terrez Worthy 13-yard run, Carl Hardin kick (Drive: 9 plays, 72 yards, 4:51; Temple 7–0)
- (4:37) TEM – JoJo Bermudez 24-yard pass from Evan Simon, Carl Hardin kick (Drive: 6 plays, 63 yards, 3:11; Temple 14–0)
- (0:36) TEM – Colin Chase 8-yard pass from Evan Simon, Carl Hardin kick (Drive: 4 plays, 75 yards, 2:10; Temple 21–0)

Second quarter

- (9:05) HOW – KD Mosley 1-yard pass from Tyriq Starks, Matt Conord kick (Drive: 13 plays, 75 yards, 6:31; Temple 21–7)
- (3:54) TEM – Carl Hardin 45-yard field goal (Drive: 10 plays, 54 yards, 5:07; Temple 24–7)
- (0:43) TEM – Kajiya Hollawayne 4-yard pass from Evan Simon, Carl Hardin kick (Drive: 5 plays, 53 yards, 1:05; Temple 31–7)

Third quarter

- (10:32) TEM – Jay Ducker 15-yard run, Carl Hardin kick (Drive: 2 plays, 47 yards, 0:51; Temple 38–7)
- (0:57) TEM – Joquez Smith 12-yard pass from Gevani McCoy, Carl Hardin kick (Drive: 13 plays, 78 yards, 7:38; Temple 45–7)

Fourth quarter

- (9:42) TEM – Carl Hardin 31-yard field goal (Drive: 9 plays, 19 yards, 5:12; Temple 48–7)
- (7:17) TEM – Hunter Smith 65-yard run, Lucas Glassburn kick (Drive: 2 plays, 63 yards, 0:56; Temple 55–7)

Statistics	HOW	TEM
First downs	9	28
Plays–yards	48–121	66–560
Rushes–yards	28–82	50–329
Passing yards	39	231
Passing: comp–att–int	8–20–1	14–16–0
Turnovers	1	0
Time of possession	23:46	36:14

Team	Category	Player	Statistics
Howard	Passing	Tyriq Starks	7/14, 34 yards, TD
Howard	Rushing	Travis Kerney	8 carries, 28 yards
Howard	Receiving	John Simmons III	1 reception, 15 yards
Temple	Passing	Evan Simon	8/10, 174 yards, 3 TD
Temple	Rushing	Jay Ducker	10 carries, 87 yards, TD
Temple	Receiving	Xavier Irvin	3 receptions, 78 yards

=== No. 13 Oklahoma ===
No. 13 Oklahoma Sooners (2–0) at Temple Owls (2–0) – Game summary

Quarter	1	2	3	4	Total
No. 13 Sooners	11	17	14	0	42
Owls	0	3	0	0	3

at Lincoln Financial Field • Philadelphia, Pennsylvania

- Date: September 13
- Game time: 12:00 p.m. EDT
- Game weather: Sunny • Temperature: 77 °F (25 °C) • Wind: N at 4 miles per hour (6.4 km/h)
- Game attendance: 24,927
- Referee: Ted Pitts
- TV announcers (ESPN2): Roy Philpott (play-by-play), Sam Acho (analyst) and Marilyn Payne (sideline)

Game information

First quarter

- (9:36) OU – Jovantae Barnes 3-yard run, Jacob Ulrich pass (Drive: 10 plays, 67 yards, 4:00; Oklahoma 8–0)
- (4:05) OU – Tate Sandell 52-yard field goal (Drive: 8 plays, 20 yards, 3:38; Oklahoma 11–0)

Second quarter

- (12:11) OU – Tory Blaylock 6-yard run, Tate Sandell kick (Drive: 12 plays, 89 yards, 4:34; Oklahoma 18–0)
- (10:05) OU – Tory Blaylock 18-yard run, Tate Sandell kick (Drive: 4 plays, 45 yards, 0:43; Oklahoma 25–0)
- (2:33) TEM – Carl Hardin 34-yard field goal (Drive: 4 plays, -3 yards, 1:03; Oklahoma 25–3)
- (0:27) OU – Tate Sandell 29-yard field goal (Drive: 10 plays, 54 yards, 2:06; Oklahoma 28–3)

Third quarter

- (7:57) OU – Xavier Robinson 6-yard pass from John Mateer, Tate Sandell kick (Drive: 6 plays, 65 yards, 1:20; Oklahoma 35–3)
- (5:47) OU – John Mateer 51-yard run, Tate Sandell kick (Drive: 2 plays, 76 yards, 0:43; Oklahoma 42–3)

Fourth quarter

- No scoring plays

Statistics	OU	TEM
First downs	29	7
Plays–yards	79–515	54–104
Rushes–yards	42–228	27–26
Passing yards	287	78
Passing: comp–att–int	21–37–1	14–27–0
Turnovers	1	0
Time of possession	32:16	27:44

Team	Category	Player	Statistics
Oklahoma	Passing	John Mateer	20/34, 282 yards, TD, INT
Oklahoma	Rushing	Tory Blaylock	14 carries, 100 yards, 2 TD
Oklahoma	Receiving	Isaiah Sategna III	7 receptions, 97 yards
Temple	Passing	Evan Simon	13/25, 75 yards
Temple	Rushing	Jay Ducker	7 carries, 24 yards
Temple	Receiving	Kajiya Hollawayne	2 receptions, 21 yards

=== at No. 18 Georgia Tech ===
Temple Owls (2–1) at No. 18 Georgia Tech Yellow Jackets (3–0) – Game summary

Quarter	1	2	3	4	Total
Owls	0	7	7	10	24
No. 18 Yellow Jackets	21	0	14	10	45

at Bobby Dodd Stadium • Atlanta, Georgia

- Date: September 20
- Game time: 4:30 p.m. EDT
- Game weather: Sunny • Temperature: 87 °F (31 °C) • Wind: SW at 2 miles per hour (3.2 km/h)
- Game attendance: 45,123
- Referee: Riley Johnson
- TV announcers (The CW): Thom Brennaman (play-by-play), Will Blackmon (analyst) and Wes Bryant (sideline)

Game information

First quarter

- (11:37) GT – Haynes King 17-yard run, Aidan Birr kick (Drive: 5 plays, 71 yards, 2:19; Georgia Tech 7–0)
- (7:37) GT – Malik Rutherford 24-yard pass from Haynes King, Aidan Birr kick (Drive: 5 plays, 63 yards, 1:49; Georgia Tech 14–0)
- (2:38) GT – Isiah Canion 37-yard pass from Haynes King, Aidan Birr kick (Drive: 6 plays, 65 yards, 2:23; Georgia Tech 21–0)

Second quarter

- (12:29) TEM – Jay Ducker 2-yard run, Carl Hardin kick (Drive: 11 plays, 75 yards, 5:09; Georgia Tech 21–7)

Third quarter

- (13:53) TEM – JoJo Bermundez 28-yard pass from Evan Simon, Carl Hardin kick (Drive: 2 plays, 31 yards, 0:41; Georgia Tech 21–14)
- (11:47) GT – Malachi Hosley 34-yard run, Aidan Birr kick (Drive: 4 plays, 75 yards, 2:06; Georgia Tech 28–14)
- (2:56) GT – Malachi Hosley 2-yard run, Aidan Birr kick (Drive: 5 plays, 68 yards, 2:41; Georgia Tech 35–14)

Fourth quarter

- (8:50) GT – Aidan Birr 32-yard field goal (Drive: 8 plays, 46 yards, 4:16; Georgia Tech 38–14)
- (5:25) GT – Carl Hardin 41-yard field goal (Drive: 8 plays, 52 yards, 3:25; Georgia Tech 38–17)
- (5:15) GT – Daylon Gordon 47-yard run, Aidan Birr kick (Drive: 1 play, 47 yards, 0:09; Georgia Tech 45–17)
- (0:03) TEM – Xavier Irvin 4-yard pass from Gevani McCoy, Carl Hardin kick (Drive: 13 plays, 75 yards, 5:12; Georgia Tech 45–24)

Statistics	TEM	GT
First downs	19	19
Plays–yards	81–328	48–468
Rushes–yards	44–184	30–307
Passing yards	144	161
Passing: comp–att–int	17–37–0	13–18–0
Turnovers	0	1
Time of possession	37:29	22:31

Team	Category	Player	Statistics
Temple	Passing	Evan Simon	13/32, 127 yards, TD
Temple	Rushing	Jay Ducker	14 carries, 76 yards, TD
Temple	Receiving	JoJo Bermudez	4 receptions, 58 yards, TD
Georgia Tech	Passing	Haynes King	13/18, 161 yards, 2 TD
Georgia Tech	Rushing	Jamal Haynes	12 carries, 107 yards
Georgia Tech	Receiving	Isiah Canion	2 receptions, 44 yards, TD

=== UTSA ===
UTSA Roadrunners (2–2) at Temple Owls (2–2) – Game summary

Quarter	1	2	3	4	Total
Roadrunners	7	7	7	0	21
Owls	3	0	21	3	27

at Lincoln Financial Field • Philadelphia, Pennsylvania

- Date: October 4
- Game time: 1:00 p.m. EDT
- Game weather: Sunny • Temperature: 77 °F (25 °C) • Wind: NE at 3 miles per hour (4.8 km/h)
- Game attendance: 12,132
- Referee: Steven Anderson
- TV announcers (ESPN+): Richard Cross (play-by-play), Barrett Brooks (analyst) and Maria Trivelpiece (sideline)

Game information

First quarter

- (8:44) UTSA – Patrick Overmyer 1-yard run, Michael Petro kick (Drive: 12 plays, 75 yards, 6:16; UTSA 7–0)
- (5:53) TEM – Carl Hardin 31-yard field goal (Drive: 7 plays, 57 yards, 2:46; UTSA 7–3)

Second quarter

- (7:21) UTSA – Patrick Overmyer 7-yard pass from Owen McCown, Michael Petro kick (Drive: 14 plays, 81 yards, 7:46; UTSA 14–3)

Third quarter

- (9:03) TEM – JoJo Bermudez 8-yard pass from Evan Simon, Carl Hardin kick (Drive: 10 plays, 75 yards, 5:57; UTSA 14–10)
- (7:24) TEM – Hunter Smith 54-yard run, Carl Hardin kick (Drive: 1 play, 54 yards, 0:09; Temple 17–14)
- (5:28) UTSA – Devin McCuin 18-yard pass from Owen McCown, Michael Petro kick (Drive: 5 plays, 75 yards, 1:56; UTSA 21–17)
- (1:30) TEM – Peter Clarke 15-yard pass from Evan Simon, Carl Hardin kick (Drive: 2 plays, 38 yards, 0:29; Temple 24–21)

Fourth quarter

- (1:56) TEM – Carl Hardin 36-yard field goal (Drive: 7 plays, 13 yards, 1:28; Temple 27–21)

Statistics	UTSA	TEM
First downs	19	15
Plays–yards	67–304	57–309
Rushes–yards	30–70	32–128
Passing yards	234	181
Passing: comp–att–int	25–37–2	16–25–0
Turnovers	2	0
Time of possession	32:19	27:41

Team	Category	Player	Statistics
UTSA	Passing	Owen McCown	25/37, 234 yards, 2 TD, 2 INT
UTSA	Rushing	Will Henderson III	10 carries, 42 yards
UTSA	Receiving	AJ Wilson	3 receptions, 67 yards
Temple	Passing	Evan Simon	16/25, 181 yards, 2 TD
Temple	Rushing	Hunter Smith	8 carries, 74 yards, TD
Temple	Receiving	Peter Clarke	4 receptions, 82 yards, TD

=== Navy ===
Navy Midshipmen (5–0) at Temple Owls (3–2) – Game summary

Quarter	1	2	3	4	Total
Midshipmen	7	0	14	11	32
Owls	7	10	7	7	31

at Lincoln Financial Field • Philadelphia, Pennsylvania

- Date: October 11
- Game time: 4:00 p.m. EDT
- Game weather: Cloudy • Temperature: 66 °F (19 °C) • Wind: SW at 7 miles per hour (11 km/h)
- Game attendance: 26,149
- Referee: Matt Overton
- TV announcers (ESPN2): Roy Philpott (play-by-play), Sam Acho (analyst) and Taylor Davis (sideline)

Game information

First quarter

- (10:18) NAVY – Cody Howard 50-yard pass from Blake Horvath, Nathan Kirkwood kick (Drive: 4 plays, 79 yards, 2:01; Navy 7–0)
- (3:19) TEM – Evan Simon 2-yard run, Carl Hardin kick (Drive: 13 plays, 75 yards, 6:59; Tied 7–7)

Second quarter

- (14:13) TEM – Carl Hardin 23-yard field goal (Drive: 8 plays, 64 yards, 2:58; Temple 10–7)
- (0:25) TEM – Jay Ducker 1-yard run, Carl Hardin kick (Drive: 10 plays, 81 yards, 2:18; Temple 17–7)

Third quarter

- (9:59) NAVY – Blake Horvath 2-yard run, Nathan Kirkwood kick (Drive: 9 plays, 74 yards, 4:55; Temple 17–14)
- (6:37) TEM – JoJo Bermudez 26-yard pass from Evan Simon, Carl Hardin kick (Drive: 6 plays, 72 yards, 3:17; Temple 24–14)
- (2:22) NAVY – Alex Tecza 2-yard run, Nathan Kirkwood kick (Drive: 9 plays, 75 yards, 4:15; Temple 24–21)

Fourth quarter

- (6:34) NAVY – Nathan Kirkwood 48-yard field goal (Drive: 15 plays, 59 yards, 8:14; Tied 24–24)
- (1:16) TEM – Jay Ducker 1-yard run, Carl Hardin kick (Drive: 11 plays, 75 yards, 5:18; Temple 31–24)
- (0:39) NAVY – Blake Horvath 51-yard run, Alex Tecza pass from Blake Horvath for 2-pt (Drive: 5 plays, 75 yards, 0:37; Navy 32–31)

Statistics	NAVY	TEM
First downs	15	27
Plays–yards	54–384	75–520
Rushes–yards	37–243	39–175
Passing yards	141	345
Passing: comp–att–int	6–17–0	25–36–0
Turnovers	0	1
Time of possession	25:58	34:02

Team	Category	Player	Statistics
Navy	Passing	Blake Horvath	6/16, 141 yards, TD
Navy	Rushing	Blake Horvath	19 carries, 155 yards, 2 TD
Navy	Receiving	Eli Heidenreich	3 receptions, 72 yards
Temple	Passing	Evan Simon	25/36, 345 yards, TD
Temple	Rushing	Jay Ducker	24 carries, 97 yards, 2 TD
Temple	Receiving	Kajiya Hollawayne	9 receptions, 146 yards

=== at Charlotte ===
Temple Owls (3–3) at Charlotte 49ers (1–5) – Game summary

Quarter	1	2	3	4	Total
Owls	7	21	21	0	49
49ers	7	0	0	7	14

at Jerry Richardson Stadium • Charlotte, North Carolina

- Date: October 18
- Game time: 3:30 p.m. EDT
- Game weather: Sunny • Temperature: 80 °F (27 °C) • Wind: SW at 8 miles per hour (13 km/h)
- Game attendance: 13,618
- Referee: Kevin Randall
- TV announcers (ESPN+): Richard Cross (play-by-play), Reginald Walker Jr. (analyst) and Smacker Miles (sideline)

Game information

First quarter

- (7:38) TEM – Colin Chase 11-yard pass from Evan Simon, Carl Hardin kick (Drive: 4 plays, 64 yards, 2:12; Temple 7–0)
- (1:38) CLT – Gus McGee 2-yard pass from Grayson Loftis, Liam Boyd kick (Drive: 11 plays, 75 yards, 6:00; Tied 7–7)

Second quarter

- (10:22) TEM – Evan Simon 5-yard run, Carl Hardin kick (Drive: 4 plays, 42 yards, 1:27; Temple 14–7)
- (9:45) TEM – Adrian Laing 64-yard interception, Carl Hardin kick (Temple 21–7)
- (1:52) TEM – Kajiya Hollawayne 64-yard pass from Evan Simon, Carl Hardin kick (Drive: 10 plays, 81 yards, 4:55; Temple 28–7)

Third quarter

- (12:29) TEM – Peter Clarke 8-yard pass from Evan Simon, Carl Hardin kick (Drive: 3 plays, 68 yards, 1:41; Temple 35–7)
- (6:00) TEM – Jay Ducker 1-yard run, Carl Hardin kick (Drive: 7 plays, 38 yards, 3:23; Temple 42–7)
- (0:48) TEM – Louis Frye 73-yard fumble recovery, Carl Hardin kick (Temple 49–7)

Fourth quarter

- (0:57) CLT – Zach Wilcke 10-yard run, Liam Boyd kick (Drive: 15 plays, 70 yards, 7:09; Temple 49–14)

Statistics	TEM	CLT
First downs	18	21
Plays–yards	53–384	76–357
Rushes–yards	30–172	47–199
Passing yards	212	158
Passing: comp–att–int	16–23–0	15–29–1
Turnovers	0	3
Time of possession	25:16	34:44

Team	Category	Player	Statistics
Temple	Passing	Evan Simon	15/22, 194 yards, 3 TD
Temple	Rushing	Jay Ducker	9 carries, 114 yards, TD
Temple	Receiving	Kajiya Hollawayne	5 receptions, 85 yards, TD
Charlotte	Passing	Grayson Loftis	10/22, 108 yards, TD, INT
Charlotte	Rushing	Jake Davids	13 carries, 42 yards
Charlotte	Receiving	Javen Nicholas	5 receptions, 50 yards

=== at Tulsa ===
Temple Owls (4–3) at Tulsa Golden Hurricane (2–5) – Game summary

Quarter	1	2	3	4	OT	Total
Owls	7	7	14	3	7	38
Golden Hurricane	3	14	7	7	6	37

at Skelly Field • Tulsa, Oklahoma

- Date: October 25
- Game time: 3:30 p.m. EDT
- Game weather: Clear • Temperature: 60 °F (16 °C) • Wind: SE at 8 miles per hour (13 km/h)
- Game attendance: 16,403
- Referee: Edwin Lee
- TV announcers (ESPN+): James Westling (play-by-play), Leger Douzable (analyst) and Maria Trivelpiece (sideline)

Game information

First quarter

- (8:32) TLSA – Seth Morgan 36-yard field goal (Drive: 11 plays, 66 yards, 6:24; Tulsa 3–0)
- (3:02) TEM – Kajiya Hollawayne 24-yard pass from Evan Simon, Carl Hardin kick (Drive: 2 plays, 43 yards, 0:48; Temple 7–3)

Second quarter

- (8:12) TEM – Jay Ducker 1-yard pass from Evan Simon, Carl Hardin kick (Drive: 10 plays, 59 yards, 6:36; Temple 14–3)
- (5:20) TLSA – Brody Foley 5-yard run, Seth Morgan kick (Drive: 8 plays, 75 yards, 2:51; Temple 14–10)
- (0:03) TLSA – Brody Foley 8-yard pass from Baylor Hayes, Seth Morgan kick (Drive: 10 plays, 99 yards, 1:52; Tulsa 17–14)

Third quarter

- (12:28) TEM – Jay Ducker 13-yard pass from Evan Simon, Carl Hardin kick (Drive: 5 plays, 79 yards, 2:25; Temple 21–17)
- (7:28) TLSA – Grayson Tempest 5-yard pass from Baylor Hayes, Seth Morgan kick (Drive: 12 plays, 75 yards, 5:00; Tulsa 24–21)
- (4:13) TEM – Kajiya Hollawayne 6-yard pass from Evan Simon, Carl Hardin kick (Drive: 6 plays, 75 yards, 3:15; Temple 28–24)

Fourth quarter

- (6:05) TEM – Carl Hardin 52-yard field goal (Drive: 6 plays, 13 yards, 2:14; Temple 31–24)
- (3:44) TLSA – Dominic Richardson 1-yard run, Seth Morgan kick (Drive: 7 plays, 75 yards, 2:16; Tied 31–31)

Overtime

- TEM – Kajiya Hollawayne 1-yard pass from Evan Simon, Carl Hardin kick (Drive: 2 plays, 25 yards, 0:00; Temple 38–31)
- TLSA – Brody Foley 9-yard pass from Baylor Hayes (Drive: 5 plays, 25 yards, 0:00; Temple 38–37)

Statistics	TEM	TLSA
First downs	22	25
Plays–yards	69–447	75–436
Rushes–yards	34–180	44–140
Passing yards	267	296
Passing: comp–att–int	24–35–0	19–31–0
Turnovers	0	1
Time of possession	31:48	28:12

Team	Category	Player	Statistics
Temple	Passing	Evan Simon	24/35, 267 yards, 5 TD
Temple	Rushing	Hunter Smith	10 carries, 92 yards
Temple	Receiving	Kajiya Hollawayne	10 receptions, 85 yards, 3 TD
Tulsa	Passing	Baylor Hayes	19/31, 296 yards, 3 TD
Tulsa	Rushing	Dominic Richardson	19 carries, 78 yards, TD
Tulsa	Receiving	Josh Smith	4 receptions, 112 yards

=== East Carolina ===
East Carolina Pirates (4–3) at Temple Owls (5–3) – Game summary

Quarter	1	2	3	4	Total
Pirates	14	14	14	3	45
Owls	7	7	0	0	14

at Lincoln Financial Field • Philadelphia, Pennsylvania

- Date: November 1
- Game time: 2:00 p.m. EDT
- Game weather: Cloudy • Temperature: 59 °F (15 °C) • Wind: W at 12 miles per hour (19 km/h)
- Game attendance: 13,168
- Referee: Reid Jackson
- TV announcers (ESPN+): Bill Spaulding (play-by-play), Barrett Brooks (analyst) and Maria Trivelpiece (sideline)

Game information

First quarter

- (13:08) ECU – Yannick Smith 7-yard pass from Katin Houser, Nick Mazzie kick (Drive: 6 plays, 75 yards, 1:52; East Carolina 7–0)
- (9:32) ECU – Anthony Smith 45-yard run, Nick Mazzie kick (Drive: 1 play, 45 yards, 0:08; East Carolina 14–0)
- (4:31) TEM – Jay Ducker 4-yard run, Carl Hardin kick (Drive: 4 plays, 27 yards, 2:15; East Carolina 14–7)

Second quarter

- (11:24) TEM – Keveun Mason 29-yard run, Carl Hardin kick (Drive: 9 plays, 75 yards, 4:32; Tied 14–14)
- (6:15) ECU – Mike Wright Jr. 15-yard run, Nick Mazzie kick (Drive: 12 plays, 73 yards, 5:05; East Carolina 21–14)
- (2:59) ECU – Yannick Smith 59-yard pass from Katin Houser, Nick Mazzie kick (Drive: 3 plays, 73 yards, 0:44; East Carolina 28–14)

Third quarter

- (8:42) ECU – London Montgomery 19-yard run, Nick Mazzie kick (Drive: 10 plays, 76 yards, 4:48; East Carolina 35–14)
- (3:52) ECU – Marlon Gunn Jr. 1-yard run, Nick Mazzie kick (Drive: 8 plays, 97 yards, 2:07; East Carolina 42–14)

Fourth quarter

- (12:06) ECU – Nick Mazzie 46-yard field goal (Drive: 11 plays, 45 yards, 4:47; East Carolina 45–14)

Statistics	ECU	TEM
First downs	26	11
Plays–yards	75–614	55–233
Rushes–yards	51–358	30–82
Passing yards	256	151
Passing: comp–att–int	19–24–1	15–25–1
Turnovers	2	1
Time of possession	31:27	28:33

Team	Category	Player	Statistics
East Carolina	Passing	Katin Houser	19/24, 256 yards, 2 TD, INT
East Carolina	Rushing	London Montgomery	14 carries, 84 yards, TD
East Carolina	Receiving	Yannick Smith	5 receptions, 100 yards, 2 TD
Temple	Passing	Evan Simon	11/20, 80 yards, INT
Temple	Rushing	Jay Ducker	15 carries, 45 yards, TD
Temple	Receiving	Colin Chase	5 receptions, 57 yards

=== at Army ===
Temple Owls (5–4) at Army Black Knights (4–4) – Game summary

Quarter	1	2	3	4	Total
Owls	0	10	3	0	13
Black Knights	0	7	7	0	14

at Michie Stadium • West Point, NY

- Date: November 8
- Game time: 12:00 p.m. EST
- Game weather: Sunny • Temperature: 60 °F (16 °C) • Wind: at 8 miles per hour (13 km/h)
- Game attendance: 30,594
- Referee: Charles Lamertina
- TV announcers (CBSSN): Dave Ryan (play-by-play), Adam Breneman (analyst) and Tina Cervasio (sideline)

Game information

First quarter

- No scoring plays

Second quarter

- (11:19) ARMY – Jake Rendina 7-yard run, Dawson Jones kick (Drive: 11 plays, 73 yards, 7:49; Army 7–0)
- (4:03) TEM – Colin Chase 12-yard pass from Evan Simon, Carl Hardin kick (Drive: 13 plays, 75 yards, 7:16; Tied 7–7)
- (0:01) TEM – Carl Hardin 24-yard field goal (Drive: 6 plays, 47 yards, 0:26; Temple 10–7)

Third quarter

- (6:39) ARMY – Cale Hellums 3-yard run, Dawson Jones kick (Drive: 14 plays, 75 yards, 8:21; Army 14–10)
- (0:22) TEM – Carl Hardin 31-yard field goal (Drive: 12 plays, 68 yards, 6:11; Temple 14–13)

Fourth quarter

- No scoring plays

Statistics	TEM	ARMY
First downs	16	20
Plays–yards	46–268	66–250
Rushes–yards	21–111	63–224
Passing yards	157	26
Passing: comp–att–int	15–25–0	1–3–0
Turnovers	0	0
Time of possession	22:22	37:38

Team	Category	Player	Statistics
Temple	Passing	Evan Simon	15/25, 157 yards, 1 TD
Temple	Rushing	Jay Ducker	8 carries, 46 yards
Temple	Receiving	Peter Clarke	2 receptions, 51 yards
Army	Passing	Cale Hellums	1/3, 26 yards
Army	Rushing	Cale Hellums	36 carries, 118 yards, 1 TD
Army	Receiving	Parker Poloskey	1 reception, 26 yards

=== No. 24 Tulane ===
No. 24 Tulane Green Wave (8–2) at Temple Owls (5–5) – Game summary

Quarter	1	2	3	4	Total
No. 24 Green Wave	10	10	6	11	37
Owls	7	0	0	6	13

at Lincoln Financial Field • Philadelphia, Pennsylvania

- Date: November 22
- Game time: 3:45 p.m. EST
- Game weather: Cloudy, 52F, Wind NNW at 8 MPH
- Game attendance: 13,366
- Referee: Charles Lamertina
- TV announcers (ESPNU): Chuckie Kempf (play-by-play) and Darius Walker (analyst)

Game information

First quarter

- TLN – Shazz Preston 69-yard pass from Jake Retzlaff (Patrick Durkin kick), 12:33. Green Wave 7–0. Drive: 2 plays, 72 yards, 0:36.
- TLN – Patrick Durkin 50-yard field goal, 4:30. Green Wave 10–0. Drive: 11 plays, 52 yards, 4:11.
- TEM – Peter Clarke 3-yard pass from Evan Simon (Carl Hardin kick), 0:27. Green Wave 10–7. Drive: 8 plays, 75 yards, 4:03.

Second quarter

- TLN – Jake Retzlaff 2-yard run (Patrick Durkin kick), 6:36. Green Wave 17–7. Drive: 5 plays, 46 yards, 2:59.
- TLN – Patrick Durkin 36-yard field goal, 0:21. Green Wave 20–7. Drive: 9 plays, 46 yards, 2:01.

Third quarter

- TLN – Patrick Durkin 38-yard field goal, 9:05. Green Wave 23–7. Drive: 12 plays, 45 yards, 5:55.
- TLN – Patrick Durkin 42-yard field goal, 0:53. Green Wave 26–7. Drive: 11 plays, 52 yards, 5:12.

Fourth quarter

- TEM – Colin Chase 2-yard pass from Evan Simon (pass failed), 12:56. Green Wave 26–13. Drive: 9 plays, 75 yards, 2:57.
- TLN – Justyn Reid 4-yard pass from Jake Retzlaff (Jake Retzlaff–Anthony Brown-Stephens pass), 9:55. Green Wave 34–13. Drive: 5 plays, 38 yards, 2:51.
- TLN – Patrick Durkin 52-yard field goal, 6:58. Green Wave 37–13. Drive: 5 plays, 21 yards, 1:28.

Statistics	TULN	TEM
First downs	22	14
Plays–yards	68–406	57–204
Rushes–yards	39–175	20–20
Passing yards	231	184
Passing: comp–att–int	17–29–0	24–37–0
Turnovers	0	1
Time of possession	34:21	25:39

Team	Category	Player	Statistics
Tulane	Passing	Jake Retzlaff	17/28, 231 yards, 2 TD
Tulane	Rushing	Jamauri McClure	17 carries, 122 yards
Tulane	Receiving	Shazz Preston	5 receptions, 96 yards, TD
Temple	Passing	Evan Simon	21/32, 168 yards, 2 TD
Temple	Rushing	Jay Ducker	7 carries, 17 yards
Temple	Receiving	Colin Chase	5 receptions, 59 yards, TD

=== at North Texas ===
Temple Owls (5-6) at North Texas Mean Green (10-1) – Game summary

Quarter	1	2	3	4	Total
Owls	7	0	7	11	25
Mean Green	14	21	10	7	52

at DATCU Stadium • Denton, Texas

- Date: November 28
- Game time: 3:30 p.m. EST
- Game weather: Cloudy • Temperature: 57 °F (14 °C)
- Game attendance: 24,492
- Referee: Tim Rich
- TV announcers (ESPN): Clay Matvick (play-by-play), Chase Daniel (analyst) and Tori Petry (sideline)

Game information

First quarter

- (8:18) UNT - Cameron Dorner 77-yard pass from Drew Mestemaker, Kali Nguma kick (Drive: 5 plays, 99 yards, 1:58; North Texas 7-0)
- (2:42) TEM - Ryder Kusch 2-yard pass from Evan Simon, Carl Hardin kick (Drive: 11 plays, 75 yards, 5:36; Tied 7-7)
- (1:08) UNT - Caleb Hawkins 5-yard run, Kali Nguma kick (Drive: 4 plays, 34 yards, 1:24; North Texas 14-7)

Second quarter

- (10:09) UNT - Caleb Hawkins 31-yard run, Kali Nguma kick (Drive: 5 plays, 99 yards, 1:46; North Texas 21-7)
- (6:22) UNT - Terrence Lewis 5-yard pass from Drew Mestemaker, Kali Nguma kick (Drive: 4 plays, 30 yards, 2:19; North Texas 28-7)
- (1:25) UNT - Caleb Hawkins 6-yard run, Kali Nguma kick (Drive: 9 plays, 78 yards, 3:25; North Texas 35-7)

Third quarter

- (11:39) TEM - Peter Clarke 16-yard pass from Jay Ducker, Carl Hardin kick (Drive: 6 plays, 38 yards, 3:13; North Texas 35-14)
- (7:07) UNT - Kali Nguma 27-yard field goal (Drive: 8 plays, 67 yards, 4:32; North Texas 38-14)
- (0:40) UNT - Terrence Lewis 13-yard pass from Drew Mestemaker, Kali Nguma kick (Drive: 7 plays, 63 yards, 3:25; North Texas 45-14)

Fourth quarter

- (11:14) TEM - Jay Ducker 5-yard run, Gevani McCoy pass to Ryder Kusch for two-point conversion (Drive: 2 plays, 5 yards, 0:10; North Texas 45-22)
- (8:25) UNT - Caleb Hawkins 1-yard run, Kali Nguma kick (Drive: 5 plays, 87 yards, 2:48; North Texas 52-22)
- (4:16) TEM - Carl Hardin 26-yard field goal (Drive: 10 plays, 67 yards, 4:09; North Texas 52-25)

Statistics	TEM	UNT
First downs	18	26
Plays–yards	70–316	64–605
Rushes–yards	37–172	40–239
Passing yards	144	366
Passing: comp–att–int	13–33–1	20–24–0
Turnovers	1	2
Time of possession	31:02	28:58

Team	Category	Player	Statistics
Temple	Passing	Evan Simon	10/27, 82 yards, TD, INT
Temple	Rushing	Hunter Smith	10 carries, 66 yards
Temple	Receiving	Colin Chase	3 receptions, 55 yards
North Texas	Passing	Drew Mestemaker	20/24, 366 yards, 3 TD
North Texas	Rushing	Caleb Hawkins	25 carries, 186 yards, 4 TD
North Texas	Receiving	Wyatt Young	6 receptions, 127 yards

== Personnel ==
=== Transfers ===
==== Outgoing ====
Player	Position	Destination
E.J. Wilson	RB	Abilene Christian
Chris Dietrich	QB	Bucknell
Tyrei Washington	RB	Cal Poly
Landon Morris	TE	California
Hugo Gil	DL	Charleston Southern
Reese Clark	TE	Delaware State
Tyler Lepolo	LB	Eastern Washington
Jamar Taylor Jr.	WR	Florida A&M
Brylan Noonan	LS	Kennesaw State
DeVonta Owens	DB	Lindenwood
Darrell Sweeting	CB	Marshall
Jamel Johnson	DB	NC State
Tra Thomas	DE	NC State
Demerick Morris	DL	Oklahoma State
Antwain Littleton II	RB	Rhode Island
Tyquan King	LB	UConn
James Faminu	OL	UNLV
Andrew McIlquham	LS	UNLV
Antwone Santiago	LB	Virginia Tech
Melvin Siani	OL	Wake Forest
Jaylen Lewis	DB	Western Kentucky
Shekuna Kamara	WR	Unknown
Kevin Terry	OL	Withdrawn
Terrez Worthy	RB	Withdrawn

==== Incoming ====
Player	Position	Previous school
CJ Van Buren II	IOL	Arkansas–Pine Bluff
Thomas Nance	TE	Bethune–Cookman
Jake Woods	TE	Cal Poly
JoJo Bermudez	WR	Delaware
Ty Davis	LB	Delaware
Charles Calhoun III	EDGE	Gannon
Nick Reeves	IOL	Georgia
Omar Ibrahim	DB	Hampton
Isaiah Hayse	LS	Indiana Wesleyan
Jayvant Brown	LB	Kentucky
Ken Meir	OL	Lindenwood
Hunter Smith	RB	Louisiana–Monroe
Avery Powell	DB	Missouri State
Willy Love	LB	Monmouth
Demerick Morris	DL	Oklahoma State
Gevani McCoy	QB	Oregon State
Earl Kulp	CB	Purdue
Anthony Chiccitt	QB	Robert Morris
Jay Ducker	RB	Sam Houston
Dontae Pollard	CB	Samford
Pooh Lawton	S	Slippery Rock
Johnny Martin	RB	Stony Brook
Colin Chase	WR	St. Thomas
Aaron Beckwith	DL	UMass
Jalen Stewart	LB	UMass
Jaylen Castleberry	DB	Youngstown State

=== Coaching staff additions ===
Name	New Position	Previous Team	Previous Position	Source
K. C. Keeler	Head coach	Sam Houston	Head coach	
Tyler Walker	Offensive coordinator/Quarterbacks	Montana State	Offensive coordinator/Quarterbacks	
Brian Smith	Defensive coordinator	Rice	Defensive coordinator/Safeties	
Al Johnson	Offensive line	Montana State	Offensive line	
Andrew Pierce	Running backs	Delaware	Assistant coach/Running backs/Recruiting coordinator	
Roy Roundtree	Wide receivers	Miami (OH)	Wide receivers	
Chris Zarkoskie	Tight ends	James Madison	Assistant offensive line	
Henry Baker	Pass game coordinator/Cornerbacks	Marshall	Co-defensive coordinator/Cornerbacks	
Cedric Calhoun	Defensive line	Rice	Defensive line	
Keith Dudzinski	Linebackers	UMass	Defensive coordinator/Linebackers	
Chris Raitano	Outside linebackers	Monmouth	Linebackers	
Brian Ginn	Special teams	Sam Houston	Offensive consultant	
