= 2026 Armed Forces Bowl (January) =

Postseason college football bowl game

2026 Lockheed Martin Armed Forces Bowl
- 23rd Armed Forces Bowl
Rice Owls	Texas State Bobcats
(5–7)	(6–6)
American	Sun Belt
10	41
Head coach: Scott Abell	Head coach: G. J. Kinne
	1	2	3	4	Total
Rice	0	7	0	3	10
Texas State	0	10	17	14	41
- Date: January 2, 2026
- Season: 2025
- Stadium: Amon G. Carter Stadium
- Location: Fort Worth, Texas
- MVP: Brad Jackson (QB, Texas State)
- Favorite: Texas State by 19.5
- Referee: Matt Packowski (MAC)
- Attendance: 28,243

United States TV coverage
- Network: ESPN
- Announcers: Lowell Galindo (play-by-play), Aaron Murray (analyst), and Lauren Sisler (sideline)

The 2026 Armed Forces Bowl was a college football bowl game played on January 2, 2026, at Amon G. Carter Stadium located in Fort Worth, Texas. The 23rd annual Armed Forces Bowl began at approximately at 12:00 p.m. CST and aired on ESPN. It was one of the 2025–26 bowl games concluding the 2025 FBS football season. The game was officially named the Lockheed Martin Armed Forces Bowl after its corporate sponsor Lockheed Martin.

The Texas State Bobcats from the Sun Belt Conference defeated the Rice Owls from the American Conference, 41–10.

Before the game, one of several parachutists who were due to land on the field appeared to become tangled in a cable above one of the end zones, causing him to fall to the ground; he reportedly was able to walk away from the accident.

== Teams ==
The Rice Owls (5–7, 2–6 American) and Texas State Bobcats (6–6, 3–5 Sun Belt) accepted invitations to play in the Armed Forces Bowl. This was Rice's second appearance in this bowl, having previously appeared in the 2012 edition, while Texas State made its inaugural trip.

The teams first met in 1920 and 1923, then had a six-decade lapse until playing again in 1986 and 1987; their most recent prior meeting was the 2023 First Responder Bowl—entering the Armed Forces Bowl, Texas State held a 3–2 edge in the series.

=== Rice Owls ===
Rice won three of their first four games, then had a three-game losing streak. After winning two of their next three games, the Owls ended their regular season with back-to-back losses. With a 5–7 record, Rice was not bowl eligible, but received a bid due to some bowl-eligible teams (such as Iowa State and Kansas State) declining bids and holding a high Academic Progress Rate.

=== Texas State Bobcats ===
Texas State also won three of their first four games. The Bobcats then had a five-game losing streak, which included two overtime defeats, followed by three consecutive wins at the end of their regular season. The Bobcats entered the Armed Forces Bowl with a 6–6 record.

== Game summary ==
2025 Lockheed Martin Armed Forces Bowl

Quarter	1	2	3	4	Total
Rice	0	7	0	3	10
Texas State	0	10	17	14	41

at Amon G. Carter Stadium • Fort Worth, Texas

- Date: January 2, 2026
- Game time: 12:00 p.m. CST
- Game weather: Sunny • Temperature: 66 °F (19 °C) • Wind: 10 mph (16 km/h) west
- Game attendance: 28,243
- Referee: Matt Packowski
- TV announcers (ESPN): Lowell Galindo (play-by-play), Aaron Murray (analyst), and Lauren Sisler (sideline)
- Box score

=== Statistics ===
Statistics	RICE	TXST
First downs	12	24
Plays–yards	65–196	67–437
Rushes–yards	44–102	41–241
Passing yards	94	196
Passing: comp–att–int	13–21–1	18–26–0
Turnovers		
Time of possession	30:32	29:28

Team	Category	Player	Statistics
Rice	Passing	Patrick Crayton Jr.	4/9, 70 yards, 1 TD, 1 INT
Rice	Rushing	Quinton Jackson	16 carries, 70 yards
Rice	Receiving	Payton Matthews	1 reception, 54 yards
Texas State	Passing	Brad Jackson	17/24, 174 yards, 3 TD
Texas State	Rushing	Lincoln Pare	11 carries, 106 yards, 1 TD
Texas State	Receiving	Beau Sparks	4 receptions, 87 yards, 1 TD
