= Quinton Jackson =

Quinton Jackson may refer to:

- Rampage Jackson (born 1978), martial artist
- Quentin Jackson, jazz musician
- Quenton Jackson, basketball player
- Quinton Jackson (American football), American football player
