= Chase Jenkins =

American football player (born 2004)

No. 10 – Kansas Jayhawks
- Position: Quarterback
- Class: Redshirt Junior

Personal information
- Born: December 2, 2004 (age 21)
- Listed height: 6 ft 0 in (1.83 m)
- Listed weight: 195 lb (88 kg)

Career information
- High school: Alief Taylor (Houston, Texas)
- College: Rice (2023–2025); Kansas (2026–present)
- Stats at ESPN

Christopher Chase Jenkins (born December 2, 2004) is an American football quarterback for the Kansas Jayhawks. He previously played for the Rice Owls.

== Early life ==
Jenkins played for Alief Taylor High School as a starting quarterback.

== College career ==
=== Rice ===
Jenkins committed to Rice University in March 2022. He played four games in 2023, including during the 2023 First Responder Bowl. In 2024, he was a redshirt freshman and played just two games.

Ahead of the 2025 Rice Owls football team, Jenkins was named the starting quarterback. He was selected by Scott Abell, the new head coach for the team. His first start was against the Louisiana Ragin' Cajuns. In week 4, against the Charlotte 49ers, he threw for one touchdown and rushed for another. He announced that he would enter the transfer portal in December 2025.

=== Kansas ===
Jenkins committed to the Kansas Jayhawks in January 2026.

=== Statistics ===
Season	Team	Games			Passing								Rushing			
Season	Team	GP	GS	Record	Cmp	Att	Pct	Yds	Y/A	TD	Int	Rtg	Att	Yds	Avg	TD
2023	Rice	5	0	—	13	19	68.4	100	5.3	0	1	102.1	14	82	5.9	1
2024	Rice	2	0	—	Redshirted (redshirt)								1	2	2.0	0
2025	Rice	12	12	5–7	119	172	69.2	1,025	6.0	9	2	134.2	151	531	3.5	5
Career		19	12	5−7	132	191	69.1	1,125	5.9	9	3	131.0	166	615	3.7	6
