= Shad Banks Jr. =

American football player (born 2003)

Profile
- Position: Linebacker

Personal information
- Born: March 28, 2003 (age 23); Houston, Texas, U.S.
- Listed height: 5 ft 11 in (1.80 m)
- Listed weight: 230 lb (104 kg)

Career information
- High school: North Shore (Harris County, Texas)
- College: TCU (2021–2024); UTSA (2025)
- NFL draft: 2026: undrafted

Career history
- Tennessee Titans (2026)*
- * Offseason or practice squad member only

Awards and highlights
- First team All-American Conference (2025)
- Stats at ESPN

Shadrach "Shad" Banks Jr. (born March 28, 2003) is an American professional football linebacker. He played college football for the UTSA Roadrunners and TCU Horned Frogs.

== Early life ==
Banks Jrr. was born on March 28, 2003 in Houston, Texas. He attended North Shore High School in Harris County, Texas. During his sophomore season, he recorded 1,312 receiving yards and 17 touchdowns, helping his school to a Class 6A Division I state title victory over Duncanville High School. Coming out of high school, Banks Jr., was rated as a five-star recruit and the 11th-overall prospect in the class of 2021 by ESPN. He committed to play college football for the Texas A&M Aggies over offers from other schools such as Alabama, Florida State, Georgia, Oklahoma, and Texas.

== College career ==
=== TCU ===
After initially enrolling at Texas A&M University in 2021, Banks Jr. entered his name into the NCAA transfer portal before the start of his freshman season. He ultimately transferred to play for the TCU Horned Frogs. As a freshman in 2021, Banks Jr. appeared in 11 games, recording 12 tackles and an interception. In the 2022 Big 12 Championship Game, he made the start, totaling a career-high ten tackles against Kansas State. In the 2022 season, Banks Jr. played in all 15 games with one start, notching 39 tackles with four going for a loss. He finished the 2023 season with 62 tackles with eight and a half being for a loss, a sack, and a forced fumble. During the 2024 season, Banks Jr. played in just four games due to injury. After the conclusion of the season, he entered the NCAA transfer portal.

=== UTSA ===
Banks Jr. transferred to play for the UTSA Roadrunners. In week 7 of the 2025 season, he recovered a fumble which he returned 41 yards for a touchdown in a blowout win over Rice. In week 13, Banks Jr. earned American Defensive Player of the Week Honors after recording ten tackles and an interception which he returned 21 yards for a touchdown in a win versus East Carolina. He finished the 2025 season with 94 tackles with seven and a half being for a loss, two sacks, three interceptions, a forced fumble, three fumble recoveries, and two touchdowns.

== Professional career ==
Pre-draft measurables
Height	Weight	Arm length	Hand span	Wingspan	40-yard dash	10-yard split	20-yard split	20-yard shuttle	Three-cone drill	Vertical jump	Broad jump	Bench press
5 ft 11 1/2 in (1.82 m)	230 lb (104 kg)	31 3/4 in (0.81 m)	9 1/8 in (0.23 m)	6 ft 5 3/8 in (1.97 m)	4.62 s	1.70 s	2.61 s	4.40 s	7.22 s	32.0 in (0.81 m)	9 ft 11 in (3.02 m)	16 reps
All values from Pro Day

On April 30, 2026, after going undrafted in the 2026 NFL draft, Banks signed with the Tennessee Titans as an undrafted free agent. On August 6, he was waived by the Titans with an injury designation.
