= Wyatt Young =

American football player

No. 10 – Oklahoma State Cowboys
- Position: Wide receiver
- Class: Junior

Personal information
- Listed height: 6 ft 0 in (1.83 m)
- Listed weight: 199 lb (90 kg)

Career information
- High school: Obra D. Tompkins (Katy, Texas)
- College: North Texas (2024–2025); Oklahoma State (2026–present)

Awards and highlights
- First-team All-the American (2025)
- Stats at ESPN

Wyatt Young is an American football wide receiver for the Oklahoma State Cowboys. He previously played for the North Texas Mean Green.

== Early life ==
Young attended Obra D. Tompkins High School in Fort Bend County, Texas, and would originally commit to play college football for the Rice Owls before committing to play for the North Texas Mean Green.

== College career ==
=== North Texas ===
In week three of the 2024 season, Young brought in a 75-yard touchdown reception versus Texas Tech. As a freshman in 2024, Young hauled in 18 passes for 295 yards and two touchdowns. In week 8 of the 2025 season, he totaled six receptions for 102 yards and three touchdowns in a win over UTSA. In week 13, Young hauled in eight passes for 295 yards and two touchdowns in a victory against Rice. He finished the 2025 season with 70 catches for 1,264 yards and ten touchdowns. For his performance he earned first-team all-American Conference honors as well as being named a PFSN First Team All-American. After the season, he entered the NCAA transfer portal.

=== Oklahoma State ===
Young transferred to play for the Oklahoma State Cowboys over other offers from schools such as Louisville, Michigan, and Missouri.

=== Statistics ===
Year	Team	Games		Receiving				Rushing			
Year	Team	GP	GS	Rec	Yds	Avg	TD	Att	Yds	Avg	TD
2024	North Texas	13	4	18	295	16.4	2	3	–7	–2.3	1
2025	North Texas	14	8	70	1,264	18.1	10	3	16	5.3	1
2026	Oklahoma State	7	7	36	639	17.8	6	1	2	2.0	0
Career		34	19	124	2,198	17.7	18	7	11	1.6	2
