= Scott Abell =

American football coach (born 1969)

Current position
- Title: Head coach
- Team: Rice
- Conference: American
- Record: 7–17

Biographical details
- Born: December 5, 1969 (age 56)

Playing career

Baseball
- 1989–1992: Longwood
- 1992: Appleton Foxes
- 1992: Eugene Emeralds
- Positions: Catcher, third baseman

Coaching career (HC unless noted)

Football
- 1993: Albemarle HS (VA) (assistant)
- 1994–1995: Western Albemarle HS (VA) (QB/DE)
- 1996: Altavista HS (VA) (OC/QB/LB)
- 1997–2001: Liberty HS (VA)
- 2002–2007: Amherst County HS (VA)
- 2008–2011: Washington and Lee (OC)
- 2012–2017: Washington and Lee
- 2018–2024: Davidson
- 2025–present: Rice

Head coaching record
- Overall: 93–69 (college)
- Bowls: 0-1
- Tournaments: 0–3 (NCAA D-III playoffs); 0–2 (NCAA D-I playoffs)

Accomplishments and honors

Championships
- 3 ODAC (2012, 2015, 2017); 2 PFL (2020–21, 2021)

Scott P. Abell (born December 5, 1969) is an American football coach and former minor league baseball player who is currently the head football coach at Rice University. Abell previously served as the head football coach at Washington & Lee University in Lexington, Virginia, from 2012 to 2017 and Davidson College in Davidson, North Carolina from 2018 to 2024. Drafted by the Kansas City Royals in 1992, he played for one year in the Royals farm system until focusing on a career in coaching.

From 1993 to 1996, Abell was an assistant at several high schools in Virginia before being named the head coach at Liberty High School in Bedford, Virginia, in 1997. He was then head coach at Amherst County High School in Amherst, Virginia, from 2002 to 2007 before joining Washington and Lee as its offensive coordinator. He was promoted to head coach of the Generals in 2012, leading them to three playoff appearances.

In 2018, Abell was named head coach at Davidson, who he led to three consecutive playoff appearances.

On November 26, 2024, Abell was named head coach at Rice. In his first season with Rice, Abell became the program's first head coach to start the season off with a 3–1 record since 2001. In Abell's first season, the program finished its regular season with a 5–7 record, but was selected to play in the Armed Forces Bowl against Texas State as a result of having the highest Academic Progress Rate among FBS 5-win schools.

== Head coaching record ==
=== College ===
Year	Team	Overall	Conference	Standing	Bowl/playoffs
Washington and Lee Generals (Old Dominion Athletic Conference) (2012–2017)
2012	Washington & Lee	8–3	6–1	1st	L NCAA Division III First Round
2013	Washington & Lee	5–5	3–4	T–4th	
2014	Washington & Lee	2–8	2–5	T–6th	
2015	Washington & Lee	10–1	7–0	1st	L NCAA Division III First Round
2016	Washington & Lee	6–4	5–2	T–2nd	
2017	Washington & Lee	8–3	5–1	1st	L NCAA Division III First Round
Washington and Lee:		39–24	28–13		
Davidson Wildcats (Pioneer Football League) (2018–2024)
2018	Davidson	6–5	3–5	6th	
2019	Davidson	8–4	5–3	4th	
2020–21	Davidson	4–3	4–1	1st	L NCAA Division I First Round
2021	Davidson	8–3	7–1	1st	L NCAA Division I First Round
2022	Davidson	8–4	6–2	T–2nd	L NCAA Division I First Round
2023	Davidson	7–4	6–2	3rd	
2024	Davidson	6–5	4–4	T–6th	
Davidson:		47–28	35–18		
Rice Owls (American Conference) (2025–present)
2025	Rice	5–8	2–6	T–11th	L Armed Forces
2026	Rice	2–9	1–6		
Rice:		7–17	3–12		
Total:		93–69			
National championship Conference title Conference division title or championship game berth
