= Brad Jackson (quarterback) =

American football player (born 2005)

No. 8 – Texas State Bobcats
- Position: Quarterback
- Class: Redshirt Sophomore

Personal information
- Born: November 25, 2005 (age 20)
- Listed height: 6 ft 0 in (1.83 m)
- Listed weight: 197 lb (89 kg)

Career information
- High school: Ronald Reagan (San Antonio, Texas)
- College: Texas State (2024–present)

Awards and highlights
- Third-team All-Sun Belt (2025)
- Stats at ESPN

Brad Jackson (born November 25, 2005) is an American college football quarterback for the Texas State Bobcats.

== Early life ==
Jackson graduated from Ronald Reagan High School located in San Antonio, Texas.

Prior to arriving at Reagan for his senior season in 2023, Jackson had already started three years on varsity at Cypress Creek High School in Houston, Texas.

He was the first freshman to start on varsity as a quarterback for Cypress Creek, a 6A Texas UIL program and did so as a 14-year-old weighing about 135 lbs. He finished his freshman season with 2,187 yards passing, 20 touchdowns and nine interceptions. Jackson ended his three seasons at Cypress Creek passing for 7,551 yards (averaging 270 yards per game) and 78 touchdowns while adding nearly 1,000 rushing yards.

Jackson passed for 2,435 yards, 28 touchdowns and three interceptions as a senior at Reagan. He added eight touchdowns and 518 yards on the ground. He led Reagan to an 11-1 record, their lone loss in the playoffs to perennial state championship contender, Austin Westlake.

Before transferring to Reagan for his final high school season, Jackson verbally committed that summer to play college football for the Texas State Bobcats.

Despite being lightly recruited with only a few FBS offers, he was heavily recruited by Texas State head coach, G.J. Kinne and then Texas State offensive coordinator, Mack Leftwich, who were extremely impressed in the passing accuracy, throwing mechanics, foot speed, decision making and maturity displayed by Jackson through his junior season of high school.

== College career ==
After graduating from Reagan in December 2023, Jackson early enrolled at Texas State and even practiced with the football team in the week leading up to the 2023 First Responders Bowl.

Jackson began his true freshman campaign in 2024 as the 3rd or 4th quarterback on the depth chart, but by midseason became the team's backup quarterback.

In week 11 of the 2024 season, Jackson made his collegiate debut, being inserted into the game in relief of injured starter, Jordan McCloud, weakened by an ankle sprain. Jackson threw for 16 yards, while adding 119 yards and two touchdowns on the ground, in a 38-17 win over Louisiana–Monroe.

Jackson finished his first collegiate season in 2024, playing in three games, completing eight of his fifteen passing attempts for 115 yards and a touchdown, while also rushing 22 times for 164 yards and four touchdowns.

Heading into the 2025 season, he beat out Holden Geriner, Keldric Luster, and Nate Yarnell for the Bobcats starting job. In his first collegiate start in the 2025 season opener, he completed 18 of his 26 passes for 214 yards and four touchdowns, in a victory over Eastern Michigan.

After week 14, the final week of the 2025 regular season, Jackson was named Earl Campbell Player of the Week. Jackson was also recognized on the Davey O'Brien Awards Great 8 and as a Manning Award Star of the Week. In that week 14 game in a win over South Alabama, Jackson threw for 280 yards and a pair of touchdowns while rushing for 113 yards and a career-high three scores en route to tying the Texas State single-season rushing touchdown record with 16, also the most among FBS quarterbacks in the 2025 regular season.

Jackson finished his 12 game regular season as a redshirt freshman in 2025 accounting for 3,741 combined passing/rushing yards and 34 touchdowns while completing 71.3% of his passes. He finished the season among the top 10 season long starting FBS quarterbacks in the country in a number of statistical categories and metrics.

On December 4, 2025, it was announced that Jackson was one of the 22 semifinalists named for the Earl Campbell Tyler Rose Award, as well as being named 3rd Team All-Sun Belt Conference.

On December 5, 2025, Jackson, along with top receiving targets, Beau Sparks and Chris Dawn Jr, announced their intentions to return to play for the Texas State Bobcats in 2026 via their social media accounts. Four weeks later, Jackson was named MVP of the 2026 Armed Forces Bowl.

=== College statistics ===
Season	Team	Games			Passing								Rushing			
Season	Team	GP	GS	Record	Cmp	Att	Pct	Yds	Avg	TD	Int	Rtg	Att	Yds	Avg	TD
2024	Texas State	3	0	—	8	15	53.3	118	7.9	1	0	141.4	22	164	7.5	4
2025	Texas State	13	13	7–6	251	352	71.3	3,224	9.2	21	7	164.0	174	744	4.3	17
2026	Texas State	10	10	6–4	197	285	69.1	2,502	8.8	22	6	164.1	111	578	5.2	7
Career		26	23	13–10	456	652	69.9	5,854	9.0	44	13	163.5	307	1,486	4.8	28
