= Quinton Jackson (American football) =

American football player (born 2004)

No. 10 – Rice Owls
- Position: Running back
- Class: Redshirt Senior

Personal information
- Born: February 20, 2004 (age 22); Fort Worth, Texas, U.S.
- Listed height: 5 ft 9 in (1.75 m)
- Listed weight: 175 lb (79 kg)

Career information
- High school: North Crowley (Fort Worth, Texas)
- College: Rice (2022–present)
- Stats at ESPN

Quinton Rashad Jackson (born February 20, 2004) is an American football running back for the Rice Owls.

== Early life ==
Jackson played at North Crowley High School, where he ran for 1,104 yards and 14 touchdowns. Playing quarterback, he threw for 1,641 yards and 18 touchdowns in his senior year. He was a two-time offensive most valuable player in his district.

== College career ==
=== Rice ===
Jackson committed to Rice in late 2021. He played his first game in 2022, in the 2022 LendingTree Bowl, rushing three times for 15 yards, alongside 54 receiving yards. Jackson was the return specialist in 2023, including a career-high 44 yard return. He finished the season with the fourth most return yards in the American Conference.

Jackson again was the primary kickoff returner in 2024. He set a school record with a 100-yard kick return against the UConn Huskies. The return was the first kickoff return touchdown for Rice since 2012.

In 2025, Rice hired Scott Abell as the team's new head coach. Abell organized the team as an option offense, which Jackson stated he was initially nervous about. Following the first team practices, he grew more comfortable with the system. After Dean Connors transferred away from the team, Jackson was expected to take the role as the leading running back in 2025. He was named to the Earl Campbell Tyler Rose Award watchlist in the preseason. His first career game as a starting running back ended with a win against the Louisiana Ragin' Cajuns.

His most successful game of the season came against the UConn Huskies. He accounted for 256 yards and four touchdowns, including a 73-yard rushing touchdown and a 75-yard receiving touchdown. In overtime, he scored the game-winning touchdown. He finished the season with 889 rushing yards and 74 receiving yards.

== Personal life ==
Jackson was born in Fort Worth, Texas.
