= 2025 Florida Atlantic Owls football team =

American college football season

2025 Florida Atlantic Owls football
- Conference: American Conference
- Record: 4–8 (3–5 American)
- Head coach: Zach Kittley (1st season)
- Offensive scheme: Air raid
- Defensive coordinator: Brett Dewhurst (1st season)
- Base defense: Multiple 4–2–5
- Home stadium: Flagler Credit Union Stadium

2025 American Conference football standings
	Conf.			Overall
Team	W		L	W		L
No. 18 Tulane y$^	7	–	1	11	–	3
No. 24 North Texas y	7	–	1	12	–	2
No. 23 Navy	7	–	1	11	–	2
South Florida	6	–	2	9	–	4
East Carolina	6	–	2	9	–	4
Memphis	4	–	4	8	–	5
Army	4	–	4	7	–	6
UTSA	4	–	4	7	–	6
Temple	3	–	5	5	–	7
Florida Atlantic	3	–	5	4	–	8
Rice	2	–	6	5	–	8
UAB	2	–	6	4	–	8
Tulsa	1	–	7	4	–	8
Charlotte	0	–	8	1	–	11
Championship: Tulane 34, North Texas 21
^ – College Football Playoff participant; $ – Conference champion; y – Championship game participant; Rankings from AP Poll

The 2025 Florida Atlantic Owls football team represented Florida Atlantic University as a member of the American Conference during the 2025 NCAA Division I FBS football season. Led by first-year head coach Zach Kittley, the Owls played home games at Flagler Credit Union Stadium in Boca Raton, Florida.

== Schedule ==
Date	Time	Opponent	Site	TV	Result	Attendance
August 30	12:00 p.m.	at Maryland*	SECU Stadium; College Park, MD	BTN	L 7–39	35,067
September 6	6:00 p.m.	Florida A&M*	Flagler Credit Union Stadium; Boca Raton, FL	ESPN+	W 56–14	21,029
September 13	6:00 p.m.	at FIU*	Pitbull Stadium; Miami, FL (Shula Bowl)	ESPN+	L 28–38	17,638
September 27	7:00 p.m.	Memphis	Flagler Credit Union Stadium; Boca Raton, FL	ESPN2	L 26–55	17,733
October 4	7:00 p.m.	at Rice	Rice Stadium; Houston, TX	ESPN+	W 27–21	22,999
October 11	6:00 p.m.	UAB	Flagler Credit Union Stadium; Boca Raton, FL	ESPN+	W 53–33	20,052
October 18	7:30 p.m.	at No. 19 South Florida	Raymond James Stadium; Tampa, FL (rivalry)	ESPNU	L 13–48	45,169
October 25	3:30 p.m.	at Navy	Navy–Marine Corps Memorial Stadium; Annapolis, MD	CBSSN	L 32–42	32,175
November 8	3:00 p.m.	Tulsa^{†}	Flagler Credit Union Stadium; Boca Raton, FL	ESPN+	W 40–21	16,170
November 15	4:00 p.m.	at Tulane	Yulman Stadium; New Orleans, LA	ESPN+	L 24–35	30,000
November 22	3:00 p.m.	UConn*	Flagler Credit Union Stadium; Boca Raton, FL	ESPN+	L 45–48	16,306
November 29	12:00 p.m.	East Carolina	Flagler Credit Union Stadium; Boca Raton, FL	ESPN+	L 3–42	14,712
*Non-conference game; ^{†}Homecoming; Rankings from AP Poll and CFP Rankings released prior to game; All times are in Eastern time

== Game summaries ==
=== at Maryland ===
Florida Atlantic Owls (0–0) at Maryland Terrapins (0–0) – Game summary

Quarter	1	2	3	4	Total
Owls	7	0	0	0	7
Terrapins	7	26	6	0	39

at SECU Stadium • College Park, Maryland

- Date: August 30
- Game time: 12:00 p.m. EDT
- Game weather: Sunny • Temperature: 70 °F (21 °C) • Wind: NW at 6 miles per hour (9.7 km/h)
- Game attendance: 35,067
- Referee: Rick Warne
- TV announcers (BTN): Joe Beninati (play-by-play), Matt Millen (analyst), and Michaella Chester (sideline)

Game information

First quarter

- MD – Daniel Wingate 20-yard interception return (Sean O'Haire kick), 6:38. Terrapins 7–0.
- FAU – Asaad Waseem 27-yard pass from Caden Veltkamp (Garrison Smith kick), 4:59. Tied 7–7. Drive: 5 plays, 58 yards, 1:32.

Second quarter

- MD – Sean O'Haire 49-yard field goal, 14:01. Terrapins 10–7. Drive: 6 plays, 24 yards, 1:29.
- MD – Team Safety, 10:42. Terrapins 12–7.
- MD – Shaleak Knotts 29-yard pass from Malik Washington (Sean O'Haire kick), 7:51. Terrapins 19–7. Drive: 6 plays, 50 yards, 2:51.
- MD – Kaleb Webb 29-yard pass from Malik Washington (Sean O'Haire kick), 3:17. Terrapins 26–7. Drive: 7 plays, 57 yards, 3:05.
- MD – Dorian Fleming 9-yard pass from Malik Washington (Sean O'Haire kick), 0:37. Terrapins 33–7. Drive: 8 plays, 67 yards, 1:14.

Third quarter

- MD – Sean O'Haire 24-yard field goal, 11:13. Terrapins 36–7. Drive: 9 plays, 69 yards, 3:43.
- MD – Sean O'Haire 42-yard field goal, 8:30. Terrapins 39–7. Drive: 5 plays, 16 yards, 1:32.

Fourth quarter

- No scoring plays.

Statistics	FAU	MD
First downs	23	22
Plays–yards	98–354	77–380
Rushes–yards	32–77	30–112
Passing yards	277	268
Passing: comp–att–int	36–62–6	28–47–0
Turnovers	6	0
Time of possession	30:26	29:34

Team	Category	Player	Statistics
Florida Atlantic	Passing	Caden Veltkamp	30/49, 228 yards, TD, 4 INT
Florida Atlantic	Rushing	Gemari Sands	9 carries, 44 yards
Florida Atlantic	Receiving	Easton Messer	15 receptions, 87 yards
Maryland	Passing	Malik Washington	27/43, 258 yards, 3 TD
Maryland	Rushing	DeJuan Williams	10 carries, 54 yards
Maryland	Receiving	Shaleak Knotts	5 receptions, 59 yards, TD

=== Florida A&M (FCS) ===
Florida A&M Rattlers (FCS) (0–1) at Florida Atlantic Owls (0–1) – Game summary

Quarter	1	2	3	4	Total
Rattlers (FCS)	0	0	7	7	14
Owls	22	17	0	17	56

at Flagler Credit Union Stadium • Boca Raton, Florida

- Date: September 6
- Game time: 6:00 p.m. EDT
- Game weather: Cloudy • Temperature: 88 °F (31 °C) • Wind: S at 6 miles per hour (9.7 km/h)
- Game attendance: 21,029
- Referee: Reid Jackson
- TV announcers (ESPN+): AJ Ricketts (play-by-play) and Patrick Murray (analyst)

Game information

First quarter

- (11:15) FAU – Dominique Henry 24-yard pass from Caden Veltkamp, Jackson Lee pass (Drive: 7 plays, 76 yards, 2:36; Florida Atlantic 8–0)
- (7:09) FAU – Lawrence Johnson 0-yard blocked punt return, Garrison Smith kick (Florida Atlantic 15–0)
- (2:37) FAU – Asaad Waseem 12-yard pass from Caden Veltkamp, Garrison Smith kick (Drive: 8 plays, 67 yards, 2:36; Florida Atlantic 22–0)

Second quarter

- (10:17) FAU – Jayshon Platt 14-yard pass from Caden Veltkamp, Garrison Smith kick (Drive: 9 plays, 64 yards, 4:28; Florida Atlantic 29–0)
- (7:26) FAU – Dominique Henry 3-yard pass from Caden Veltkamp, Garrison Smith kick (Drive: 6 plays, 54 yards, 1:57; Florida Atlantic 36–0)
- (3:18) FAU – Garrison Smith 29-yard field goal (Drive: 10 plays, 55 yards, 3:13; Florida Atlantic 39–0)

Third quarter

- (8:57) FAMU – Jamar Taylor 27-yard pass from RJ Johnson III, Daniel Porto kick (Drive: 7 plays, 85 yards, 3:29; Florida Atlantic 39–7)

Fourth quarter

- (12:22) FAU – Asaad Waseem 0-yard fumble recovery, Garrison Smith kick (Drive: 12 plays, 86 yards, 3:48; Florida Atlantic 46–7)
- (10:23) FAMU – Jordan Edwards 65-yard pass from RJ Johnson III, Daniel Porto kick (Drive: 4 plays, 75 yards, 1:59; Florida Atlantic 46–14)
- (7:09) FAU – Kaden Shields-Dutton 1-yard run, Garrison Smith kick (Drive: 8 plays, 68 yards, 3:06; Florida Atlantic 53–14)
- (3:53) FAU – Garrison Smith 48-yard field goal (Drive: 6 plays, 36 yards, 1:29; Florida Atlantic 56–14)

Statistics	FAMU	FAU
First downs	16	34
Plays–yards	64–297	79–553
Rushes–yards	29–70	34–193
Passing yards	227	360
Passing: comp–att–int	19–35–0	29–45–0
Turnovers	0	0
Time of possession	30:15	29:45

Team	Category	Player	Statistics
Florida A&M	Passing	RJ Johnson III	18/28, 222 yards, 2 TD
Florida A&M	Rushing	Thad Franklin Jr.	11 carries, 58 yards
Florida A&M	Receiving	Jordan Edwards	2 receptions, 72 yards, TD
Florida Atlantic	Passing	Caden Veltkamp	27/39, 309 yards, 5 TD
Florida Atlantic	Rushing	Gemari Sands	10 carries, 83 yards
Florida Atlantic	Receiving	Easton Messer	4 receptions, 62 yards

=== at FIU (Shula Bowl) ===
Florida Atlantic Owls (1–1) at FIU Panthers (1–1) – Game summary

Quarter	1	2	3	4	Total
Owls	7	14	0	7	28
Panthers	7	10	21	0	38

at Pitbull Stadium • Miami, Florida

- Date: September 13
- Game time: 6:00 p.m. EDT
- Game weather: Sunny • Temperature: 80 °F (27 °C) • Wind: E at 5 miles per hour (8.0 km/h)
- Game attendance: 17,638
- Referee: Scott Hardin
- TV announcers (ESPN+): Steve Goldstein (play-by-play) and Kim Bokamper (analyst)

Game information

First quarter

- (5:43) FIU – Kejon Owens 4-yard run, Robert Czeremcha kick (Drive: 8 plays, 48 yards, 4:24; FIU 7–0)
- (3:43) FAU – Caden Veltkamp 10-yard run, Garrison Smith kick (Drive: 4 plays, 75 yards, 2:00; Tied 7–7)

Second quarter

- (14:56) FIU – Kejon Owens 1-yard run, Robert Czeremcha kick (Drive: 3 plays, 49 yards, 0:33; FIU 14–7)
- (9:36) FAU – Easton Messer 23-yard pass from Caden Veltkamp, Garrison Smith kick (Drive: 6 plays, 41 yards, 2:16; Tied 14–14)
- (3:32) FIU – Robert Czeremcha 39-yard field goal (Drive: 12 plays, 56 yards, 6:50; FIU 17–14)
- (0:57) FAU – Xavier Terrell 32-yard pass from Caden Veltkamp, Garrison Smith kick (Drive: 8 plays, 75 yards, 2:35; Florida Atlantic 21–17)

Third quarter

- (11:31) FIU – Keyone Jenkins 4-yard run, Robert Czeremcha kick (Drive: 8 plays, 75 yards, 3:29; FIU 24–21)
- (9:04) FIU – Alex Perry 26-yard pass from Keyone Jenkins, Robert Czeremcha kick (Drive: 3 plays, 55 yards, 1:11; FIU 31–21)
- (4:55) FIU – Anthony Carrie 1-yard run, Robert Czeremcha kick (Drive: 5 plays, 85 yards, 2:39; FIU 38–21)

Fourth quarter

- (7:45) FAU – Jarvis Johnson 4-yard blocked punt return, Garrison Smith kick (FIU 38–28)

Statistics	FAU	FIU
First downs	24	17
Plays–yards	82–478	64–408
Rushes–yards	31–135	40–224
Passing yards	343	184
Passing: comp–att–int	33–51–3	18–24–0
Turnovers	3	1
Time of possession	26:05	33:55

Team	Category	Player	Statistics
Florida Atlantic	Passing	Caden Veltkamp	33/50, 343 yards, 2 TD, 3 INT
Florida Atlantic	Rushing	Gemari Sands	14 carries, 105 yards
Florida Atlantic	Receiving	Jayshon Platt	5 receptions, 90 yards
FIU	Passing	Keyone Jenkins	18/24, 184 yards, TD
FIU	Rushing	Kejon Owens	19 carries, 173 yards, 2 TD
FIU	Receiving	Maguire Anderson	5 receptions, 81 yards

=== Memphis ===
Memphis Tigers (4–0) at Florida Atlantic Owls (1–2) – Game summary

Quarter	1	2	3	4	Total
Tigers	10	7	7	31	55
Owls	7	9	3	7	26

at Flagler Credit Union Stadium • Boca Raton, Florida

- Date: September 27
- Game time: 7:00 p.m. EDT
- Game weather: Cloudy • Temperature: 89 °F (32 °C) • Wind: NE at 16 miles per hour (26 km/h)
- Game attendance: 17,733
- Referee: Matt Overton
- TV announcers (ESPN2): Jay Alter (play-by-play), Rocky Boiman (analyst), and Tori Petry (sideline)

Game information

First quarter

- (12:42) MEM – Brendon Lewis 18-yard run, Gianni Spetic kick (Drive: 4 plays, 75 yards, 2:18; Memphis 7–0)
- (9:10) FAU – Caden Veltkamp 1-yard run, Garrison Smith kick (Drive: 10 plays, 75 yards, 3:32; Tied 7–7)
- (3:08) MEM – Gianni Spetic 52-yard field goal (Drive: 10 plays, 41 yards, 6:02; Memphis 10–7)

Second quarter

- (9:44) FAU – Jayshon Platt 10-yard run, pass failed (Drive: 13 plays, 56 yards, 5:37; Florida Atlantic 13–10)
- (2:18) FAU – Garrison Smith 27-yard field goal (Drive: 9 plays, 45 yards, 2:42; Florida Atlantic 16–10)
- (0:22) MEM – Greg Desrosiers Jr. 2-yard run, Gianni Spetic kick (Drive: 10 plays, 75 yards, 1:56; Memphis 17–16)

Third quarter

- (9:57) MEM – Greg Desrosiers Jr. 90-yard run, Gianni Spetic kick (Drive: 3 plays, 99 yards, 1:34; Memphis 24–16)
- (4:29) FAU – Garrison Smith 29-yard field goal (Drive: 7 plays, 67 yards, 1:52; Memphis 24–19)

Fourth quarter

- (14:55) MEM – Cortez Braham Jr. 18-yard pass from Brendon Lewis, Gianni Spetic kick (Drive: 9 plays, 65 yards, 4:34; Memphis 31–19)
- (10:20) FAU – Xavier Terrell 1-yard run, Garrison Smith kick (Drive: 6 plays, 19 yards, 1:59; Memphis 31–26)
- (9:32) MEM – Cortez Braham Jr. 73-yard pass from Brendon Lewis, Gianni Spetic kick (Drive: 2 plays, 75 yards, 0:48; Memphis 38–26)
- (4:54) MEM – Gianni Spetic 25-yard field goal (Drive: 6 plays, 17 yards, 3:17; Memphis 41–26)
- (2:02) MEM – Greg Desrosiers Jr. 1-yard run, Gianni Spetic kick (Drive: 3 plays, 48 yards, 1:05; Memphis 48–26)
- (1:04) MEM – Brendon Lewis 15-yard run, Gianni Spetic kick (Drive: 2 plays, 15 yards, 0:51; Memphis 55–26)

Statistics	MEM	FAU
First downs	24	19
Plays–yards	65–487	80–397
Rushes–yards	46–291	29–75
Passing yards	196	322
Passing: comp–att–int	13–19–0	32–51–0
Turnovers	1	1
Time of possession	31:05	28:55

Team	Category	Player	Statistics
Memphis	Passing	Brendon Lewis	13/19, 196 yards, 2 TD
Memphis	Rushing	Greg Desrosiers Jr.	19 carries, 204 yards, 3 TD
Memphis	Receiving	Cortez Braham Jr.	6 receptions, 127 yards, 2 TD
Florida Atlantic	Passing	Caden Veltkamp	31/50, 318 yards
Florida Atlantic	Rushing	Caden Veltkamp	8 carries, 28 yards, TD
Florida Atlantic	Receiving	Easton Messer	9 receptions, 131 yards

=== at Rice ===
Florida Atlantic Owls (1–3) at Rice Owls (3–2) – Game summary

Quarter	1	2	3	4	Total
Florida Atlantic Owls	14	3	7	3	27
Rice Owls	7	0	7	7	21

at Rice Stadium • Houston, Texas

- Date: October 4
- Game time: 7:00 p.m. EDT
- Game weather: Sunny • Temperature: 86 °F (30 °C) • Wind: N at 10 miles per hour (16 km/h)
- Game attendance: 22,999
- Referee: Edwin Lee
- TV announcers (ESPN+): James Westling (play-by-play), LaDarrin McLane (analyst), and Smacker Miles (sideline)

Game information

First quarter

- (13:34) RICE – Quinton Jackson 68-yard run, Enock Gota kick (Drive: 3 plays, 75 yards, 1:26; Rice 7–0)
- (11:23) FAU – Michael Kirch 30-yard pass from Caden Veltkamp, Garrison Smith kick (Drive: 6 plays, 75 yards, 2:11; Tied 7–7)
- (6:57) FAU – Asaad Waseem 38-yard pass from Caden Veltkamp, Garrison Smith kick (Drive: 6 plays, 54 yards, 1:55; Florida Atlantic 14–7)

Second quarter

- (4:36) FAU – Garrison Smith 36-yard field goal (Drive: 6 plays, 54 yards, 3:08; Florida Atlantic 17–7)

Third quarter

- (4:44) RICE – Drayden Dickmann 46-yard pass from Chase Jenkins, Enock Gota kick (Drive: 11 plays, 90 yards, 5:39; Florida Atlantic 17–14)
- (1:50) FAU – Michael Kirch 2-yard pass from Caden Veltkamp, Garrison Smith kick (Drive: 8 plays, 76 yards, 2:54; Florida Atlantic 24–14)

Fourth quarter

- (6:03) FAU – Garrison Smith 26-yard field goal (Drive: 13 plays, 76 yards, 6:33; Florida Atlantic 27–14)
- (3:19) RICE – Chase Jenkins 2-yard run, Enock Gota kick (Drive: 8 plays, 75 yards, 2:44; Florida Atlantic 27–21)

Statistics	FAU	RICE
First downs	20	18
Plays–yards	66–393	65–350
Rushes–yards	33–103	48–213
Passing yards	290	137
Passing: comp–att–int	23–33–1	12–17–0
Turnovers	2	0
Time of possession	28:46	31:14

Team	Category	Player	Statistics
Florida Atlantic	Passing	Caden Veltkamp	23/33, 290 yards, 3 TD, INT
Florida Atlantic	Rushing	Xavier Terrell	20 carries, 69 yards
Florida Atlantic	Receiving	Easton Messer	11 receptions, 110 yards
Rice	Passing	Chase Jenkins	12/17, 137 yards, TD
Rice	Rushing	Quinton Jackson	19 carries, 128 yards, TD
Rice	Receiving	Drayden Dickmann	4 receptions, 61 yards, TD

=== UAB ===
UAB Blazers (2–3) at Florida Atlantic Owls (2–3) – Game summary

Quarter	1	2	3	4	Total
Blazers	0	14	16	3	33
Owls	21	14	15	3	53

at Flagler Credit Union Stadium • Boca Raton, Florida

- Date: October 11
- Game time: 6:00 p.m. EDT
- Game weather: Cloudy • Temperature: 80 °F (27 °C) • Wind: SE at 2 miles per hour (3.2 km/h)
- Game attendance: 20,052
- Referee: Charles Lamertina
- TV announcers (ESPN+): James Westling (play-by-play), Leger Douzable (analyst) and Smacker Miles (sideline)

Game information

First quarter

- (10:07) FAU – Kaden Shields-Dutton 13-yard run, Garrison Smith kick (Drive: 7 plays, 64 yards, 3:12; Florida Atlantic 7–0)
- (5:17) FAU – Kaden Shields-Dutton 2-yard run, Garrison Smith kick (Drive: 8 plays, 45 yards, 2:46; Florida Atlantic 14–0)
- (0:27) FAU – Jayshon Platt 48-yard pass from Easton Messer, Garrison Smith kick (Drive: 3 plays, 81 yards, 0:34; Florida Atlantic 21–0)

Second quarter

- (13:04) FAU – Jabari Smith 37-yard pass from Caden Veltkamp, Garrison Smith kick (Drive: 2 plays, 40 yards, 0:41; Florida Atlantic 28–0)
- (5:47) UAB – Solomon Beebe 14-yard run, run failed (Drive: 14 plays, 77 yards, 7:11; Florida Atlantic 28–6)
- (3:15) UAB – Solomon Beebe 13-yard run, Iverson Hooks pass (Drive: 4 plays, 21 yards, 2:19; Florida Atlantic 28–14)
- (1:29) FAU – Dominique Henry 43-yard pass from Caden Veltkamp, Garrison Smith kick (Drive: 7 plays, 75 yards, 1:46; Florida Atlantic 35–14)

Third quarter

- (11:40) FAU – Kaden Shields-Dutton 1-yard run, Garrison Smith kick (Drive: 7 plays, 50 yards, 3:12; Florida Atlantic 42–14)
- (7:31) UAB – Nate Rogers 11-yard run, Ryder Burton run (Drive: 9 plays, 75 yards, 4:09; Florida Atlantic 42–22)
- (4:44) FAU – Asaad Waseem 29-yard pass from Caden Veltkamp, Asaad Waseem pass (Drive: 7 plays, 80 yards, 2:43; Florida Atlantic 50–22)
- (1:53) UAB – Isaiah Jacobs 3-yard pass from Jalen Kitna, Solomon Beebe run (Drive: 6 plays, 75 yards, 2:51; Florida Atlantic 50–30)

Fourth quarter

- (5:05) UAB – Jonah Delange 45-yard field goal (Drive: 12 plays, 36 yards, 6:50; Florida Atlantic 50–33)
- (1:57) FAU – Garrison Smith 28-yard field goal (Drive: 8 plays, 29 yards, 3:08; Florida Atlantic 53–33)

Statistics	UAB	FAU
First downs	19	24
Plays–yards	69–329	62–494
Rushes–yards	28–68	31–149
Passing yards	261	345
Passing: comp–att–int	29–41–0	21–31–1
Turnovers	0	1
Time of possession	35:13	24:47

Team	Category	Player	Statistics
UAB	Passing	Jalen Kitna	29/41, 261 yards, TD
UAB	Rushing	Solomon Beebe	4 carries, 34 yards, 2 TD
UAB	Receiving	Solomon Beebe	6 receptions, 63 yards
Florida Atlantic	Passing	Caden Veltkamp	20/30, 297 yards, 3 TD, INT
Florida Atlantic	Rushing	Kaden Shields-Dutton	15 carries, 77 yards, 3 TD
Florida Atlantic	Receiving	Asaad Waseem	7 receptions, 105 yards, TD

=== at No. 19 South Florida ===
Florida Atlantic Owls (3–3) at No. 19 South Florida Bulls (5–1) – Game summary

Quarter	1	2	3	4	Total
Owls	3	3	7	0	13
No. 19 Bulls	7	14	10	17	48

at Raymond James Stadium • Tampa, Florida

- Date: October 18
- Game time: 7:30 p.m. EDT
- Game weather: Cloudy • Temperature: 80 °F (27 °C) • Wind: SE at 7 miles per hour (11 km/h)
- Game attendance: 45,169
- Referee: Matt Overton
- TV announcers (ESPNU): Jack Kizer (play-by-play) and Craig Haubert (analyst)

Game information

First quarter

- (11:46) USF – Byrum Brown 22-yard run, Nico Gramatica kick (Drive: 12 plays, 75 yards, 3:14; South Florida 7–0)
- (5:53) FAU – Garrison Smith 45-yard field goal (Drive: 14 plays, 51 yards, 5:48; South Florida 7–3)

Second quarter

- (12:00) USF – Jonathan Echols 19-yard pass from Byrum Brown, Nico Gramatica kick (Drive: 7 plays, 75 yards, 2:48; South Florida 14–3)
- (9:40) USF – Cole Skinner 1-yard run, Nico Gramatica kick (Drive: 7 plays, 35 yards, 2:17; South Florida 21–3)
- (0:00) FAU – Garrison Smith 28-yard field goal (Drive: 14 plays, 45 yards, 4:28; South Florida 21–6)

Third quarter

- (12:12) FAU – Michael Kirch 3-yard pass from Caden Veltkamp, Garrison Smith kick (Drive: 7 plays, 75 yards, 2:48; South Florida 21–13)
- (8:20) USF – Nico Gramatica 41-yard field goal (Drive: 5 plays, 41 yards, 1:27; South Florida 24–13)
- (4:10) USF – Wyatt Sullivan 24-yard pass from Byrum Brown, Nico Gramatica kick (Drive: 7 plays, 70 yards, 2:00; South Florida 31–13)

Fourth quarter

- (13:39) USF – Jeremiah Koger 60-yard pass from Byrum Brown, Nico Gramatica kick (Drive: 6 plays, 93 yards, 1:31; South Florida 38–13)
- (9:05) USF – Nykahi Davenport 2-yard run, Nico Gramatica kick (Drive: 5 plays, 45 yards, 2:04; South Florida 45–13)
- (2:50) USF – Nico Gramatica 28-yard field goal (Drive: 9 plays, 21 yards, 5:08; South Florida 48–13)

Statistics	FAU	USF
First downs	25	26
Plays–yards	88–312	76–522
Rushes–yards	30–23	51–259
Passing yards	289	263
Passing: comp–att–int	41–58–1	15–25–0
Turnovers	1	0
Time of possession	31:26	28:34

Team	Category	Player	Statistics
Florida Atlantic	Passing	Caden Veltkamp	35/50, 244 yards, TD, INT
Florida Atlantic	Rushing	Kaden Shields-Dutton	7 carries, 25 yards
Florida Atlantic	Receiving	Asaad Waseem	8 receptions, 56 yards
South Florida	Passing	Byrum Brown	14/24, 256 yards, 3 TD
South Florida	Rushing	Byrum Brown	14 carries, 111 yards, TD
South Florida	Receiving	Jeremiah Koger	4 receptions, 90 yards, TD

=== at Navy ===
Florida Atlantic Owls (3–4) at Navy Midshipmen (6–0) – Game summary

Quarter	1	2	3	4	Total
Owls	10	3	0	19	32
Midshipmen	14	7	0	21	42

at Navy–Marine Corps Memorial Stadium • Annapolis, Maryland

- Date: October 25
- Game time: 3:30 p.m. EDT
- Game weather: Cloudy • Temperature: 60 °F (16 °C) • Wind: SW at 5 miles per hour (8.0 km/h)
- Game attendance: 32,175
- Referee: Reid Jackson
- TV announcers (CBSSN): Chris Lewis (play-by-play), Randy Cross (analyst) and Brandon Baylor (sideline)

Game information

First quarter

- FAU – Jayshon Platt 43-yard pass from Caden Veltkamp (Garrison Smith kick), 12:17. Owls 7–0. Drive: 10 plays, 75 yards, 2:43.
- NAVY – Blake Horvath 7-yard run (Nathan Kirkwood kick), 7:38. Tied 7–7. Drive: 8 plays, 72 yards, 4:33.
- NAVY – Braxton Woodson 16-yard run (Nathan Kirkwood kick), 6:16. Midshipmen 14–7. Drive: 2 plays, 23 yards, 0:45.
- FAU – Garrison Smith 30-yard field goal, 2:35. Midshipmen 14–10. Drive: 9 plays, 56 yards, 3:35.

Second quarter

- NAVY – Blake Horvath 7-yard run (Nathan Kirkwood kick), 11:45. Midshipmen 21–10. Drive: 11 plays, 75 yards, 5:50.
- FAU – Garrison Smith 38-yard field goal, 7:37. Midshipmen 21–13. Drive: 9 plays, 58 yards, 4:04.

Third quarter

- No scoring plays.

Fourth quarter

- NAVY – Alex Tecza 1-yard run (Nathan Kirkwood kick), 13:47. Midshipmen 28–13. Drive: 3 plays, 41 yards, 1:13.
- NAVY – Blake Horvath 19-yard run (Nathan Kirkwood kick), 9:40. Midshipmen 35–13. Drive: 4 plays, 41 yards, 2:09.
- FAU – Kaden Shields-Dutton 5-yard pass from Caden Veltkamp (pass failed), 5:38. Midshipmen 35–19. Drive: 16 plays, 85 yards, 3:57.
- NAVY – Blake Horvath 31-yard run (Nathan Kirkwood kick), 5:29. Midshipmen 42–19. Drive: 1 play, 35 yards, 0:09.
- FAU – Jabari Smith Jr. 4-yard pass from Zach Gibson (pass failed), 2:00. Midshipmen 42–25. Drive: 13 plays, 60 yards, 3:29.
- FAU – Jabari Smith Jr. 9-yard pass from Zach Gibson (Garrison Smith kick), 1:10. Midshipmen 42–32. Drive: 5 plays, 37 yards, 0:49.

Statistics	FAU	NAVY
First downs	23	26
Plays–yards	81–450	69–503
Rushes–yards	26–69	56–397
Passing yards	381	106
Passing: comp–att–int	34–55–1	9–13–0
Turnovers	3	1
Time of possession	26:46	33:14

Team	Category	Player	Statistics
Florida Atlantic	Passing	Caden Veltkamp	25/41, 299 yards, 2 TD, INT
Florida Atlantic	Rushing	Gemari Sands	7 carries, 22 yards
Florida Atlantic	Receiving	Jayshon Platt	5 receptions, 121 yards, TD
Navy	Passing	Blake Horvath	8/12, 83 yards
Navy	Rushing	Blake Horvath	21 carries, 174 yards, 4 TD
Navy	Receiving	Brandon Chatman	5 receptions, 43 yards

=== Tulsa ===
Tulsa Golden Hurricane (2–6) at Florida Atlantic Owls (3–5) – Game summary

Quarter	1	2	3	4	Total
Golden Hurricane	0	6	12	3	21
Owls	10	21	3	6	40

at Flagler Credit Union Stadium • Boca Raton, Florida

- Date: November 8
- Game time: 3:00 p.m. EST
- Game weather: Sunny • Temperature: 86 °F (30 °C) • Wind: NE at 6 miles per hour (9.7 km/h)
- Game attendance: 16,170
- Referee: Matt Overton
- TV announcers (ESPN+): A.J. Ricketts (play-by-play), Patrick Murray (analyst) and Maria Trivelpiece (sideline)

Game information

First quarter

- (12:47) FAU – Garrison Smith 35-yard field goal (Drive: 5 plays, 20 yards, 1:11; Florida Atlantic 3–0)
- (6:00) FAU – Jayshon Platt 47-yard pass from Caden Veltkamp, Garrison Smith kick (Drive: 6 plays, 67 yards, 2:06; Florida Atlantic 10–0)

Second quarter

- (9:56) TLSA – Seth Morgan 35-yard field goal (Drive: 10 plays, 80 yards, 4:15; Florida Atlantic 10–3)
- (7:39) TLSA – Seth Morgan 49-yard field goal (Drive: 4 plays, 3 yards, 1:15; Florida Atlantic 10–6)
- (5:21) FAU – Easton Messer 44-yard pass from Caden Veltkamp, Garrison Smith kick (Drive: 6 plays, 75 yards, 2:18; Florida Atlantic 17–6)
- (0:58) FAU – Damarius McGhee 95-yard fumble return, Garrison Smith kick (Florida Atlantic 24–6)
- (0:14) FAU – Easton Messer 11-yard pass from Caden Veltkamp, Garrison Smith kick (Drive: 4 plays, 42 yards, 0:29; Florida Atlantic 31–6)

Third quarter

- (9:38) TLSA – Baylor Hayes 7-yard run, pass failed (Drive: 12 plays, 47 yards, 4:34; Florida Atlantic 31–12)
- (5:34) FAU – Garrison Smith 20-yard field goal (Drive: 11 plays, 72 yards, 4:04; Florida Atlantic 34–12)
- (2:38) TLSA – Ajay Allen 2-yard run, pass failed (Drive: 7 plays, 75 yards, 2:56; Florida Atlantic 34–18)

Fourth quarter

- (13:01) TLSA – Seth Morgan 22-yard field goal (Drive: 7 plays, 29 yards, 2:40; Florida Atlantic 34–21)
- (9:58) FAU – Easton Messer 9-yard pass from Zach Gibson, pass failed (Drive: 6 plays, 75 yards, 3:03; Florida Atlantic 40–21)

Statistics	TLSA	FAU
First downs	27	15
Plays–yards	99–431	57–420
Rushes–yards	53–196	25–109
Passing yards	235	311
Passing: comp–att–int	24–46–2	23–32–0
Turnovers	3	1
Time of possession	36:47	23:13

Team	Category	Player	Statistics
Tulsa	Passing	Baylor Hayes	24/46, 235 yards, 2 INT
Tulsa	Rushing	Ajay Allen	23 carries, 118 yards, TD
Tulsa	Receiving	Ajay Allen	7 receptions, 67 yards
Florida Atlantic	Passing	Caden Veltkamp	21/29, 272 yards, 3 TD
Florida Atlantic	Rushing	Kaden Shields-Dutton	10 carries, 107 yards
Florida Atlantic	Receiving	Jayshon Platt	5 receptions, 114 yards, TD

=== at Tulane ===
Florida Atlantic Owls (4–5) at Tulane Green Wave (7–2) – Game summary

Quarter	1	2	3	4	Total
Owls	3	7	0	14	24
Green Wave	7	14	7	7	35

at Yulman Stadium • New Orleans, LA

- Date: November 15
- Game time: 3:00 p.m. CDT
- Game attendance: 30,000
- Referee: Reid Jackson
- TV announcers (ESPN+): Jack Benjamin (play-by-play), Barrett Brooks (analyst) and Smacker Miles (sideline)

Game information

First quarter

- TLN – Jimmy Calloway 14-yard run (Patrick Durkin kick), 6:38. Green Wave 7–0. Drive: 1 play, 14 yards, 0:06.
- FAU – Garrison Smith 25-yard field goal, 2:06. Green Wave 7–3. Drive: 7 plays, 68 yards, 4:32.

Second quarter

- TLN – Bryce Bohanon 29-yard pass from Jake Retzlaff (Patrick Durkin kick), 14:54. Green Wave 14–3. Drive: 6 plays, 80 yards, 1:59.
- FAU – Jayshon Platt 4-yard pass from Caden Veltkamp (Garrison Smith kick), 11:06. Green Wave 14–10. Drive: 11 plays, 75 yards, 3:48.
- TLN – Anthony Miller 14-yard pass from Jake Retzlaff (Patrick Durkin kick), 7:08. Green Wave 21–10. Drive: 8 plays, 75 yards, 3:58.

Third quarter

- TLN – Jamauri McClure 8-yard run (Patrick Durkin kick), 1:00. Green Wave 28–10. Drive: 5 plays, 51 yards, 2:28.

Fourth quarter

- FAU – Kaden Shields-Dutton 1-yard run (pass failed), 11:09. Green Wave 28–16. Drive: 17 plays, 75 yards, 4:51.
- TLN – Jake Retzlaff 1-yard run (Patrick Durkin kick), 4:30. Green Wave 35–16. Drive: 13 plays, 67 yards, 6:33.
- FAU – Easton Messer 12-yard pass from Caden Veltkamp (Caden Veltkamp–Asaad Waseem pass), 1:49. Green Wave 35–24. Drive: 9 plays, 75 yards, 2:41.

Statistics	FAU	TULN
First downs	32	21
Plays–yards	86–472	64–403
Rushes–yards	29–97	37–162
Passing yards	375	241
Passing: comp–att–int	39–57–3	18–27–1
Turnovers	4	1
Time of possession	30:20	29:40

Team	Category	Player	Statistics
Florida Atlantic	Passing	Caden Veltkamp	39/57, 375 yards, 2 TD, 3 INT
Florida Atlantic	Rushing	Kaden Shields-Dutton	10 carries, 54 yards, TD
Florida Atlantic	Receiving	Easton Messer	9 receptions, 133 yards, TD
Tulane	Passing	Jake Retzlaff	18/27, 241 yards, 2 TD, INT
Tulane	Rushing	Jamauri McClure	10 carries, 94 yards, TD
Tulane	Receiving	Bryce Bohanon	3 receptions, 56 yards, TD

=== UConn ===
UConn Huskies (8–3) at Florida Atlantic Owls (4–6) – Game summary

Quarter	1	2	3	4	Total
Huskies	24	3	7	14	48
Owls	3	14	14	14	45

at Flagler Credit Union Stadium • Boca Raton, Florida

- Date: November 22
- Game time: 3:00 p.m. EST
- Game weather: Sunny • Temperature: 82 °F (28 °C) • Wind: SE at 8 miles per hour (13 km/h)
- Game attendance: 16,306
- Referee: Steven Anderson
- TV announcers (ESPN+): A.J. Ricketts (play-by-play), Patrick Murray (analyst) and Savanna Collins (sideline)

Game information

First quarter

- CONN - Chris Freeman 39-yard field goal, 12:08. Huskies 3–0. Drive: 7 plays, 54 yards, 02:52.
- FAU - Garrison Smith 49-yard field goal, 8:47. Tied 3–3. Drive: 9 plays, 44 yards, 03:21.
- CONN - John Neider 24-yard pass from Joe Fagnano (Chris Freeman kick), 6:21. Huskies 10–3. Drive: 7 plays, 77 yards, 02:20.
- CONN - Shamar Porter 56-yard pass from Joe Fagnano (Chris Freeman kick), 3:38. Huskies 17–3. Drive: 2 plays, 60 yards, 00:47.
- CONN - Alex Honig 32-yard pass from Joe Fagnano (Chris Freeman kick), 1:21. Huskies 24–3. Drive: 2 plays, 55 yards, 00:45.

Second quarter

- FAU - Easton Messer 39-yard run (Garrison Smith kick), 14:18. Huskies 24–10. Drive: 7 plays, 75 yards, 02:03.
- FAU - Caden Veltkamp 17-yard run (Garrison Smith kick), 5:22. Huskies 24–17. Drive: 9 plays, 80 yards, 03:08.
- CONN - Chris Freeman 25-yard field goal, 1:09. Huskies 27–17. Drive: 12 plays, 69 yards, TOP 04:06

Third quarter

- FAU - Kaden Shields-Dutton 11-yard run (Garrison Smith kick), 12:01. Huskies 27–24. Drive: 9 plays, 75 yards, 02:59.
- FAU - Dom Henry 90-yard pass from Caden Veltkamp (Garrison Smith kick), 6:48. Owls 31–27. Drive: 4 plays, 99 yards, 01:50.
- CONN - Cam Edwards 1-yard run (Chris Freeman kick), 2:09. Huskies 34–31. Drive: 9 plays, 75 yards, 04:39.

Fourth quarter

- CONN - Mel Brown 44-yard run (Chris Freeman kick), 10:11. Huskies 41–31. Drive: 7 plays, 71 yards, 03:32.
- FAU - Easton Messer 33-yard pass from Caden Veltkamp (Garrison Smith kick), 7:13. Huskies 41–38. Drive: 10 plays, 75 yards, 02:58.
- FAU - Caden Veltkamp 11-yard run (Garrison Smith kick), 2:11. Owls 45–41. Drive: 11 plays, 76 yards, 03:14.
- CONN - Cam Edwards 1-yard run (Chris Freeman kick), 0:26. Huskies 48–45. Drive: 15 plays, 75 yards, 01:45.

Statistics	CONN	FAU
First downs	31	37
Plays–yards	79–600	87–687
Rushes–yards	33–154	32–193
Passing yards	446	494
Passing: Comp–Att–Int	33-46-0	42-55-1
Turnovers	0	2
Time of possession	32:28	27:32

Team	Category	Player	Statistics
UConn	Passing	Joe Fagnano	33/46, 446 yards, 3 TD
UConn	Rushing	Cam Edwards	16 carries, 101 yards, 2 TD
UConn	Receiving	Skyler Bell	8 receptions, 125 yards
UConn	Defense	Lee Molette III	13 tackles
Florida Atlantic	Passing	Caden Veltkamp	42/55, 494 yards, 2 TD
Florida Atlantic	Rushing	Kaden Shields-Dutton	14 carries, 77 yards, TD
Florida Atlantic	Receiving	Dom Henry	7 receptions, 157 yards, TD
Florida Atlantic	Defense	Leon Hart Jr.	9 tackles

=== East Carolina ===
East Carolina Pirates (7-4) at Florida Atlantic Owls (4-7) – Game summary

Quarter	1	2	3	4	Total
Pirates	21	21	0	0	42
Owls	3	0	0	0	3

at Flagler Credit Union Stadium • Boca Raton, Florida

- Date: November 29
- Game time: 12:00 p.m. EST
- Game attendance: 14,712
- Referee: Edwin Lee
- TV announcers (ESPN+): A.J. Ricketts (play-by-play), Leger Douzable (analyst) and Maria Trivelpiece (sideline)

Game information

First quarter

- ECU – Marlon Gunn Jr. 1-yard run (Nick Mazzie kick), 10:27. Pirates 7–0. Drive: 13 plays, 75 yards, 4:33.
- ECU – Desirrio Riles 27-yard pass from Katin Houser (Nick Mazzie kick), 10:10. Pirates 14–0. Drive: 1 play, 27 yards, 0:09.
- ECU – Brock Spalding 22-yard pass from Katin Houser (Nick Mazzie kick), 7:04. Pirates 21–0. Drive: 6 plays, 84 yards, 2:14.
- FAU – Garrison Smith 33-yard field goal, 1:00. Pirates 21–3. Drive: 4 plays, -5 yards, 1:14.

Second quarter

- ECU – Katin Houser 4-yard run (Nick Mazzie kick), 10:54. Pirates 28–3. Drive: 14 plays, 75 yards, 5:06.
- ECU – Rion Roseborough 1-yard run (Nick Mazzie kick), 3:10. Pirates 35–3. Drive: 10 plays, 61 yards, 5:29.
- ECU – Katin Houser 7-yard run (Nick Mazzie kick), 0:14. Pirates 42–3. Drive: 9 plays, 76 yards, 1:28.

Third quarter

- No scoring plays.

Fourth quarter

- No scoring plays.

Statistics	ECU	FAU
First downs	28	21
Plays–yards	86–512	73–338
Rushes–yards	56–254	22–39
Passing yards	258	299
Passing: comp–att–int	20–30–0	31–51–3
Turnovers	1	5
Time of possession	34:39	25:21

Team	Category	Player	Statistics
East Carolina	Passing	Katin Houser	20/29, 258 yards, 2 TD
East Carolina	Rushing	Marlon Gunn Jr.	14 carries, 130 yards, TD
East Carolina	Receiving	Desirrio Riles	7 receptions, 87 yards, TD
Florida Atlantic	Passing	Caden Veltkamp	19/31, 183 yards, 2 INT
Florida Atlantic	Rushing	Gemari Sands	9 carries, 34 yards
Florida Atlantic	Receiving	Easton Messer	10 receptions, 86 yards

== Personnel ==
=== Transfers ===
==== Outgoing ====
Player	Position	Destination
Zeke Moore	TE	Boston College
Luke Whiting	LS	Georgia Tech
Tyriq Starks	QB	Jackson State
Kam Bell	TE	Jacksonville State
Caleb Coombs	WR	Jacksonville State
Morgan Suarez	K	James Madison
Chrisdasson Saint-Jean	OT	Kennesaw State
Jordan Church	OL	Louisville
Fabian Scott	S	Mercer
Carter Davis	K	Miami (FL)
Antonio Smith	S	Missouri State
EJ Horton	WR	Purdue
CJ Campbell Jr.	RB	Rutgers
August Salvati	EDGE	San Diego State
Brayden Ramey	OT	South Alabama
Jacob Merrifield	DL	South Florida
Wyatt Sullivan	TE	South Florida
Jah Miller	CB	Texas Southern
Nick Salmon	P	Texas State
Robert Hammond III	K	Toledo
Omari Hayes	WR	Tulane
Zuberi Mobley	RB	Tulane
Cam Fancher	QB	UCF
Elijah Brown	TE	UCF
Phillip Dunnam	S	UCF
Jayden Williams	CB	UCF
Logic Hudgens	CB	UT Rio Grande Valley
Leon Washington	WR	Valdosta State
CJ Heard	S	Vanderbilt
Chisom Ifeanyi	EDGE	Wyoming
Jayden George	QB	Unknown
Curtis Janvier	S	Unknown
Ethan Proffitt	IOL	Unknown
Marvin Alexander	WR	Unknown
Loren Ward	DL	Unknown
Richard Thomas	DL	Unknown
Jayshon Platt	WR	Withdrawn
Daughtry Richardson	OL	Withdrawn
Alex Atcavage	OL	Withdrawn
Kasen Weisman	QB	Withdrawn

==== Incoming ====
Player	Position	Previous school
Garrison Smith	K	Akron
Khmari Johnson	LB	Austin Peay
Earl Miller Jr.	DL	Bethune–Cookman
Naejuan Barber	DL	Coastal Carolina
Asaad Waseem	WR	Colorado
Ben Corniello	DL	Columbia
Jackson Lee	LS	FIU
Zach Gibson	QB	Georgia State
Enyce Sledge	DL	Illinois
Vince Fiacable	OL	Indiana
Damarius McGhee	CB	Kansas
Jayden Sweeney	S	Liberty
Madden Sanker	OL	Louisville
Leon Hart Jr.	LB	Marshall
Tyler Stolsky	LB	Minnesota
Chris Keys Jr.	S	Mississippi State
Joe Moore	EDGE	Missouri
CJ Doggette	DL	Ohio
Derrick Rogers Jr.	DB	Purdue
Tycoolhill Luman	DE	Rutgers
Tyclean Luman	DE	Rutgers
Reid Mikeska	TE	South Carolina
Chenellson Exume	DL	South Florida
Loren Hall	S	Southeastern Louisiana
Qae'shon Sapp	IOL	SMU
MJ Hinson	CB	Texas Southern
Quincy Brown	WR	Texas State
Mike Kirch	TE	Thomas More
Deshaun Batiste	EDGE	Tulane
Damien Alford	WR	Utah
Martavious Collins	TE	UTEP
Terez Reid	CB	UTEP
Dillion Williams	CB	UTEP
JR Wilson	WR	Virginia
Antonio Robinson Jr.	DB	Wake Forest
Carson Osmus	OT	Washington State
Caden Veltkamp	QB	Western Kentucky
Easton Messer	WR	Western Kentucky

=== Coaching staff additions ===
Name	New position	Previous team	Previous position	Source
Zach Kittley	Head coach	Texas Tech	Offensive coordinator, quarterbacks	
Brett Dewhurst	Defensive coordinator	Coastal Carolina	Defensive analyst	
Tyler Schovanec	Special teams	Texas Tech	Assistant special teams, specialist	
DJ McCarthy	Wide receivers	Bethune–Cookman	Assistant head coach/Special teams, tight ends	
Jajuan Dulaney	Tight ends	UTEP	Tight end, Offensive recruiting coordinator	
Stephen Hamby	Offensive line	Texas Tech	Offensive line	
Devin Santana	Defensive line	Miami	Assistant defensive line	
Aaron Schwanz	Inside linebackers	Georgia Southern	Linebackers	
