= 2025 Charlotte 49ers football team =

American college football season

2025 Charlotte 49ers football
- Conference: American Conference
- Record: 1–11 (0–8 American)
- Head coach: Tim Albin (1st season)
- Offensive coordinator: Todd Fitch (1st season)
- Offensive scheme: Spread option
- Defensive coordinator: Nate Faanes (1st season)
- Co-defensive coordinator: Kurt Mattix (1st season)
- Base defense: 4–2–5
- Home stadium: Jerry Richardson Stadium

2025 American Conference football standings
	Conf.			Overall
Team	W		L	W		L
No. 18 Tulane y$^	7	–	1	11	–	3
No. 24 North Texas y	7	–	1	12	–	2
No. 23 Navy	7	–	1	11	–	2
South Florida	6	–	2	9	–	4
East Carolina	6	–	2	9	–	4
Memphis	4	–	4	8	–	5
Army	4	–	4	7	–	6
UTSA	4	–	4	7	–	6
Temple	3	–	5	5	–	7
Florida Atlantic	3	–	5	4	–	8
Rice	2	–	6	5	–	8
UAB	2	–	6	4	–	8
Tulsa	1	–	7	4	–	8
Charlotte	0	–	8	1	–	11
Championship: Tulane 34, North Texas 21
^ – College Football Playoff participant; $ – Conference champion; y – Championship game participant; Rankings from AP Poll

The 2025 Charlotte 49ers football team represented the University of North Carolina at Charlotte as a member of the American Conference during 2025 NCAA Division I FBS football season. Led by first-year head coach Tim Albin, the 49ers played their home games at Jerry Richardson Stadium in Charlotte, North Carolina.

== Schedule ==
Date	Time	Opponent	Site	TV	Result	Attendance
August 29	7:00 p.m.	vs. Appalachian State*	Bank of America Stadium; Charlotte, NC (Duke's Mayo Classic)	ESPNU	L 11–34	35,718
September 6	7:00 p.m.	North Carolina*	Jerry Richardson Stadium; Charlotte, NC	ESPN+	L 3–20	19,233
September 13	6:00 p.m.	No. 20 (FCS) Monmouth*	Jerry Richardson Stadium; Charlotte, NC	ESPN+	W 42–35	15,681
September 18	7:30 p.m.	Rice	Jerry Richardson Stadium; Charlotte, NC	ESPN	L 17–28	13,397
October 3	7:00 p.m.	at South Florida	Raymond James Stadium; Tampa, FL	ESPN2	L 26–54	34,577
October 11	12:00 p.m.	at Army	Michie Stadium; West Point, NY	CBSSN	L 7–24	31,172
October 18	3:30 p.m.	Temple^{†}	Jerry Richardson Stadium; Charlotte, NC	ESPN+	L 14–49	13,618
October 24	7:00 p.m.	North Texas	Jerry Richardson Stadium; Charlotte, NC	ESPN2	L 20–54	9,626
November 8	3:00 p.m.	at East Carolina	Dowdy–Ficklen Stadium; Greenville, NC	ESPN+	L 22–48	39,096
November 15	12:00 p.m.	UTSA	Jerry Richardson Stadium; Charlotte, NC	ESPN+	L 7–28	9,831
November 22	12:45 p.m.	at No. 4 Georgia*	Sanford Stadium; Athens, GA	SECN	L 3–35	93,033
November 29	7:30 p.m.	at No. 24 Tulane	Yulman Stadium; New Orleans, LA	ESPNU	L 0–27	22,245
*Non-conference game; ^{†}Homecoming; Rankings from AP Poll (and CFP Rankings, after November 4) - Released prior to game; All times are in Eastern time

== Game summaries ==
=== vs. Appalachian State ===
Appalachian State Mountaineers (0–0) vs. Charlotte 49ers (0–0) – Game summary

Quarter	1	2	3	4	Total
Mountaineers	0	17	10	7	34
49ers	3	0	0	8	11

at Bank of America Stadium • Charlotte, North Carolina

- Date: August 29
- Game time: 7:00 p.m. EDT
- Game weather: Sunny • Temperature: 81 °F (27 °C) • Wind: S at 5 miles per hour (8.0 km/h)
- Game attendance: 35,718
- Referee: Scott Broadway
- TV announcers (ESPNU): Courtney Lyle (play-by-play) and Rene Ingoglia (analyst)

Game information

First quarter

- (1:21) CLT – Liam Boyd 42-yard field goal (Drive: 13 plays, 55 yards, 6:28; Charlotte 3–0)

Second quarter

- (8:38) APP – Rashod Dubinion 2-yard run, Dominic DeFreitas kick (Drive: 9 plays, 81 yards, 3:18; Appalachian State 7–3)
- (0:36) APP – Jaden Barnes 10-yard pass from AJ Swann, Dominic DeFreitas kick (Drive: 14 plays, 80 yards, 4:36; Appalachian State 14–3)
- (0:00) APP – Dominic DeFreitas 47-yard field goal (Drive: 4 plays, 6 yards, 0:23; Appalachian State 17–3)

Third quarter

- (10:22) APP – Dominic DeFreitas 35-yard field goal (Drive: 10 plays, 58 yards, 4:38; Appalachian State 20–3)
- (4:27) APP – Kanen Hamlett 19-yard pass from AJ Swann, Dominic DeFreitas kick (Drive: 11 plays, 73 yards, 4:16; Appalachian State 27–3)

Fourth quarter

- (10:25) CLT – E. Jai Mason 16-yard pass from Conner Harrell, Gus McGee pass (Drive: 15 plays, 57 yards, 5:55; Appalachian State 27–11)
- (4:00) APP – Alex Sanchez 1-yard pass from AJ Swann, Dominic DeFreitas kick (Drive: 14 plays, 75 yards, 6:25; Appalachian State 34–11)

Statistics	APP	CLT
First downs	32	15
Plays–yards	88–586	54–218
Rushes–yards	38–182	29–76
Passing yards	404	142
Passing: comp–att–int	33–50–0	13–25–1
Turnovers	1	2
Time of possession	33:58	26:02

Team	Category	Player	Statistics
Appalachian State	Passing	AJ Swann	31/46, 368 yards, 3 TD
Appalachian State	Rushing	Rashod Dubinion	22 carries, 111 yards, TD
Appalachian State	Receiving	Jaden Barnes	6 receptions, 134 yards, TD
Charlotte	Passing	Conner Harrell	13/24, 142 yards, TD, INT
Charlotte	Rushing	CJ Stokes	15 carries, 49 yards
Charlotte	Receiving	Justin Olson	2 receptions, 56 yards

=== North Carolina ===
North Carolina Tar Heels (0–1) at Charlotte 49ers (0–1) – Game summary

Quarter	1	2	3	4	Total
Tar Heels	10	7	0	3	20
49ers	0	3	0	0	3

at Jerry Richardson Stadium • Charlotte, North Carolina

- Date: September 6
- Game time: 7:00 p.m. EDT
- Game weather: Rain • Temperature: 74 °F (23 °C) • Wind: E at 7 miles per hour (11 km/h)
- Game attendance: 19,233
- Referee: Adam Savoie
- TV announcers (ESPN+): Chuckie Kempf (play-by-play), Tom Luginbill (analyst) and Marilyn Payne (sideline)

Game information

First quarter

- (14:01) UNC – Chris Culliver 51-yard pass from Gio Lopez, Rece Verhoff kick (Drive: 3 plays, 75 yards, 0:59; North Carolina 7–0)
- (8:34) UNC – Rece Verhoff 49-yard field goal (Drive: 7 plays, 34 yards, 3:44; North Carolina 10–0)

Second quarter

- (12:40) CLT – Liam Boyd 39-yard field goal (Drive: 11 plays, 60 yards, 5:27; North Carolina 10–3)
- (0:13) UNC – Davion Gause 12-yard run, Rece Verhoff kick (Drive: 11 plays, 80 yards, 2:38; North Carolina 17–3)

Third quarter

- No scoring plays

Fourth quarter

- (10:46) UNC – Rece Verhoff 33-yard field goal (Drive: 14 plays, 40 yards, 8:08; North Carolina 20–3)

Statistics	UNC	CLT
First downs	15	21
Plays–yards	58–303	71–271
Rushes–yards	33–148	29–21
Passing yards	155	250
Passing: comp–att–int	17–25–0	25–42–2
Turnovers	0	2
Time of possession	29:38	30:22

Team	Category	Player	Statistics
North Carolina	Passing	Gio Lopez	17/25, 155 yards, TD
North Carolina	Rushing	Demon June	9 carries, 52 yards
North Carolina	Receiving	Chris Culliver	3 receptions, 74 yards, TD
Charlotte	Passing	Conner Harrell	17/29, 140 yards
Charlotte	Rushing	Rod Gainey Jr.	6 carries, 15 yards
Charlotte	Receiving	Javen Nicholas	11 receptions, 122 yards

=== No. 20 (FCS) Monmouth ===
No. 20 (FCS) Monmouth Hawks (2–0) at Charlotte 49ers (0–2) – Game summary

Quarter	1	2	3	4	Total
No. 20 (FCS) Hawks	7	7	7	14	35
49ers	0	7	21	14	42

at Jerry Richardson Stadium • Charlotte, North Carolina

- Date: September 13
- Game time: 6:00 p.m. EDT
- Game weather: Sunny • Temperature: 79 °F (26 °C) • Wind: NE at 8 miles per hour (13 km/h)
- Game attendance: 15,681
- Referee: Steven Anderson
- TV announcers (ESPN+): Justin Kutcher (play-by-play) and Reggie Walker (analyst)

Game information

First quarter

- (3:17) MONM – Elijah Jennings 1-yard run, Hudson Fiene kick (Drive: 7 plays, 40 yards, 3:03; Monmouth 7–0)

Second quarter

- (1:52) CLT – E. Jai Mason 7-yard pass from Conner Harrell, Liam Boyd kick (Drive: 7 plays, 77 yards, 3:01; Tied 7–7)
- (0:51) MONM – Maxwell James 15-yard pass from Derek Robertson, Hudson Fiene kick (Drive: 6 plays, 75 yards, 1:01; Monmouth 14–7)

Third quarter

- (12:18) CLT – Conner Harrell 8-yard run, Liam Boyd kick (Drive: 6 plays, 76 yards, 2:36; Tied 14–14)
- (10:02) MONM – Josh Derry 29-yard pass from Derek Robertson, Hudson Fiene kick (Drive: 5 plays, 75 yards, 2:16; Monmouth 21–14)
- (7:59) CLT – Rod Gainey Jr. 1-yard run, Liam Boyd kick (Drive: 5 plays, 65 yards, 2:03; Tied 21–21)
- (1:15) CLT – Joey Bearns III 4-yard pass from Conner Harrell, Liam Boyd kick (Drive: 9 plays, 55 yards, 3:34; Charlotte 28–21)

Fourth quarter

- (14:55) MONM – Rodney Nelson 8-yard pass from Derek Robertson, Hudson Fiene kick (Drive: 4 plays, 75 yards, 1:20; Tied 28–28)
- (8:37) CLT – E. Jai Mason 24-yard pass from Conner Harrell, Liam Boyd kick (Drive: 11 plays, 84 yards, 6:07; Charlotte 35–28)
- (3:19) MONM – Josh Derry 4-yard pass from Derek Robertson, Hudson Fiene kick (Drive: 11 plays, 75 yards, 5:18; Tied 35–35)
- (1:30) CLT – Conner Harrell 2-yard run, Liam Boyd kick (Drive: 6 plays, 65 yards, 1:49; Charlotte 42–35)

Statistics	MONM	CLT
First downs	28	29
Plays–yards	72–458	72–563
Rushes–yards	23–48	42–181
Passing yards	410	382
Passing: comp–att–int	36–49–0	26–30–1
Turnovers	0	3
Time of possession	26:52	33:08

Team	Category	Player	Statistics
Monmouth	Passing	Derek Robertson	36/49, 410 yards, 4 TD
Monmouth	Rushing	Rodney Nelson	11 carries, 45 yards
Monmouth	Receiving	Josh Derry	7 receptions, 110 yards, 2 TD
Charlotte	Passing	Conner Harrell	26/30, 382 yards, 3 TD, INT
Charlotte	Rushing	Rod Gainey Jr.	15 carries, 74 yards, TD
Charlotte	Receiving	E. Jai Mason	10 receptions, 228 yards, 2 TD

=== Rice ===
Rice Owls (2–1) at Charlotte 49ers (1–2) – Game summary

Quarter	1	2	3	4	Total
Owls	7	7	7	7	28
49ers	3	6	0	8	17

at Jerry Richardson Stadium • Charlotte, North Carolina

- Date: September 18
- Game time: 7:30 p.m. EDT
- Game weather: Sunny • Temperature: 86 °F (30 °C) • Wind: W at 3 miles per hour (4.8 km/h)
- Game attendance: 13,397
- Referee: Reid Jackson
- TV announcers (ESPN): Matt Barrie (play-by-play), Tom Luginbill (analyst) and Harry Lyles Jr. (sideline)

Game information

First quarter

- (8:51) CLT – Liam Boyd 29-yard field goal (Drive: 12 plays, 63 yards, 6:09; Charlotte 3–0)
- (4:25) RICE – Drayden Dickmann 9-yard pass from Chase Jenkins, Enock Gota kick (Drive: 9 plays, 75 yards, 4:26; Rice 7–3)

Second quarter

- (7:55) CLT – Liam Boyd 25-yard field goal (Drive: 12 plays, 64 yards, 4:58; Rice 7–6)
- (2:23) CLT – Liam Boyd 40-yard field goal (Drive: 8 plays, 45 yards, 3:34; Charlotte 9–7)
- (1:18) RICE – Chase Jenkins 34-yard run, Enock Gota kick (Drive: 6 plays, 75 yards, 1:05; Rice 14–9)

Third quarter

- (11:33) RICE – Daelen Alexander 13-yard run, Enock Gota kick (Drive: 7 plays, 75 yards, 3:27; Rice 21–9)

Fourth quarter

- (10:31) RICE – Daelen Alexander 1-yard run, Enock Gota kick (Drive: 9 plays, 57 yards, 4:29; Rice 28–9)
- (7:27) CLT – Javen Nicholas 31-yard pass from Grayson Loftis, Javen Nicholas pass (Drive: 10 plays, 75 yards, 3:04; Rice 28–17)

Statistics	RICE	CLT
First downs	17	22
Plays–yards	58–353	76–334
Rushes–yards	46–255	32–75
Passing yards	98	259
Passing: comp–att–int	9–12–0	23–44–0
Turnovers	0	1
Time of possession	30:12	29:48

Team	Category	Player	Statistics
Rice	Passing	Chase Jenkins	8/11, 87 yards, TD
Rice	Rushing	Quinton Jackson	12 carries, 80 yards
Rice	Receiving	Drayden Dickmann	4 receptions, 39 yards, TD
Charlotte	Passing	Grayson Loftis	15/31, 186 yards, TD
Charlotte	Rushing	Rod Gainey Jr.	8 carries, 51 yards
Charlotte	Receiving	Javen Nicholas	5 receptions, 93 yards, TD

=== at South Florida ===
Charlotte 49ers (1–3) at South Florida Bulls (3–1) – Game summary

Quarter	1	2	3	4	Total
49ers	0	7	3	16	26
Bulls	23	10	0	21	54

at Raymond James Stadium • Tampa, Florida

- Date: October 3
- Game time: 7:00 p.m. EDT
- Game weather: Sunny • Temperature: 86 °F (30 °C) • Wind: NE at 12 miles per hour (19 km/h)
- Game attendance: 34,577
- Referee: Tim Rich
- TV announcers (ESPN2): Courtney Lyle (play-by-play), Rene Ingoglia (analyst) and Marilyn Payne (sideline)

Game information

First quarter

- (14:01) USF – Cartevious Norton 37-yard run, Nico Gramatica kick (Drive: 6 plays, 75 yards, 0:59; South Florida 7–0)
- (7:07) USF – Jeremiah Koger 38-yard pass from Byrum Brown, Nico Gramatica kick (Drive: 7 plays, 77 yards, 2:18; South Florida 14–0)
- (5:23) USF – Team safety (South Florida 16–0)
- (1:03) USF – Mudia Reuben 10-yard pass from Byrum Brown, Nico Gramatica kick (Drive: 6 plays, 40 yards, 1:37; South Florida 23–0)

Second quarter

- (14:15) USF – Nico Gramatica 43-yard field goal (Drive: 4 plays, 5 yards, 1:04; South Florida 26–0)
- (3:44) CLT – CJ Stokes 1-yard run, Liam Boyd kick (Drive: 3 plays, 34 yards, 1:08; South Florida 26–7)
- (1:10) USF – Chas Nimrod 18-yard pass from Byrum Brown, Nico Gramatica kick (Drive: 10 plays, 75 yards, 2:34; South Florida 33–7)

Third quarter

- (9:39) CLT – Liam Boyd 33-yard field goal (Drive: 10 plays, 60 yards, 5:21; South Florida 33–10)

Fourth quarter

- (13:58) CLT – E. Jai Mason 2-yard pass from Zach Wilcke, Jake Young pass (Drive: 3 plays, 4 yards, 0:52; South Florida 33–18)
- (9:11) USF – Evan Dangler 1-yard pass from Byrum Brown, Nico Gramatica kick (Drive: 13 plays, 65 yards, 4:47; South Florida 40–18)
- (6:48) USF – Byrum Brown 13-yard run, Nico Gramatica kick (Drive: 7 plays, 53 yards, 2:17; South Florida 47–18)
- (3:10) CLT – Derrick Eley 16-yard pass from Zach Wilcke, Jake Young pass (Drive: 9 plays, 75 yards, 3:38; South Florida 47–26)
- (0:43) USF – Nykahi Davenport 7-yard run, Nico Gramatica kick (Drive: 8 plays, 43 yards, 2:26; South Florida 54–26)

Statistics	CLT	USF
First downs	15	36
Plays–yards	62–279	97–631
Rushes–yards	33–130	62–407
Passing yards	149	224
Passing: comp–att–int	16–29–2	20–35–2
Turnovers	4	4
Time of possession	28:14	31:46

Team	Category	Player	Statistics
Charlotte	Passing	Zach Wilcke	14/18, 150 yards, 2 TD, INT
Charlotte	Rushing	CJ Stokes	13 carries, 54 yards, TD
Charlotte	Receiving	Sean Brown	4 receptions, 58 yards
South Florida	Passing	Byrum Brown	19/34, 211 yards, 4 TD, 2 INT
South Florida	Rushing	Byrum Brown	17 carries, 162 yards, TD
South Florida	Receiving	Jeremiah Koger	4 receptions, 75 yards, TD

=== at Army ===
Charlotte 49ers (1–4) at Army Black Knights (2–3) – Game summary

Quarter	1	2	3	4	Total
49ers	0	0	0	7	7
Black Knights	7	10	7	0	24

at Michie Stadium • West Point, New York

- Date: October 11
- Game time: 12:00 p.m. EDT
- Game weather: Cloudy • Temperature: 64 °F (18 °C) • Wind: NE at 3 miles per hour (4.8 km/h)
- Game attendance: 31,172
- Referee: Steven Anderson
- TV announcers (CBSSN): Dave Ryan (play-by-play), Adam Breneman (analyst) and Tina Cervasio (sideline)

Game information

First quarter

- (3:40) ARMY – Cale Hellums 1-yard run, Dawson Jones kick (Drive: 9 plays, 80 yards, 5:06; Army 7–0)

Second quarter

- (3:39) ARMY – Carson Smith 5-yard run, Dawson Jones kick (Drive: 17 plays, 85 yards, 10:51; Army 14–0)
- (0:00) ARMY – Dawson Jones 38-yard field goal (Drive: 7 plays, 31 yards, 1:14; Army 17–0)

Third quarter

- (4:16) ARMY – Cale Hellums 1-yard run, Dawson Jones kick (Drive: 8 plays, 54 yards, 4:08; Army 24–0)

Fourth quarter

- (0:08) CLT – KD Hunter-Gibson 16-yard pass from Grayson Loftis, Liam Boyd kick (Drive: 8 plays, 59 yards, 1:46; Army 24–7)

Statistics	CLT	ARMY
First downs	11	20
Plays–yards	55–178	69–355
Rushes–yards	29–68	63–305
Passing yards	110	50
Passing: comp–att–int	16–26–0	2–6–0
Turnovers	1	1
Time of possession	22:06	37:54

Team	Category	Player	Statistics
Charlotte	Passing	Grayson Loftis	8/12, 68 yards, TD
Charlotte	Rushing	Rod Gainey Jr.	19 carries, 51 yards
Charlotte	Receiving	Sean Brown	4 receptions, 32 yards
Army	Passing	Cale Hellums	2/4, 50 yards
Army	Rushing	Cale Hellums	21 carries, 143 yards, 2 TD
Army	Receiving	Noah Short	1 reception, 44 yards

=== Temple ===
Temple Owls (3–3) at Charlotte 49ers (1–5) – Game summary

Quarter	1	2	3	4	Total
Owls	7	21	21	0	49
49ers	7	0	0	7	14

at Jerry Richardson Stadium • Charlotte, North Carolina

- Date: October 18
- Game time: 3:30 p.m. EDT
- Game weather: Sunny • Temperature: 80 °F (27 °C) • Wind: SW at 8 miles per hour (13 km/h)
- Game attendance: 13,618
- Referee: Kevin Randall
- TV announcers (ESPN+): Richard Cross (play-by-play), Reginald Walker Jr. (analyst) and Smacker Miles (sideline)

Game information

First quarter

- (7:38) TEM – Colin Chase 11-yard pass from Evan Simon, Carl Hardin kick (Drive: 4 plays, 64 yards, 2:12; Temple 7–0)
- (1:38) CLT – Gus McGee 2-yard pass from Grayson Loftis, Liam Boyd kick (Drive: 11 plays, 75 yards, 6:00; Tied 7–7)

Second quarter

- (10:22) TEM – Evan Simon 5-yard run, Carl Hardin kick (Drive: 4 plays, 42 yards, 1:27; Temple 14–7)
- (9:45) TEM – Adrian Laing 64-yard interception, Carl Hardin kick (Temple 21–7)
- (1:52) TEM – Kajiya Hollawayne 64-yard pass from Evan Simon, Carl Hardin kick (Drive: 10 plays, 81 yards, 4:55; Temple 28–7)

Third quarter

- (12:29) TEM – Peter Clarke 8-yard pass from Evan Simon, Carl Hardin kick (Drive: 3 plays, 68 yards, 1:41; Temple 35–7)
- (6:00) TEM – Jay Ducker 1-yard run, Carl Hardin kick (Drive: 7 plays, 38 yards, 3:23; Temple 42–7)
- (0:48) TEM – Louis Frye 73-yard fumble recovery, Carl Hardin kick (Temple 49–7)

Fourth quarter

- (0:57) CLT – Zach Wilcke 10-yard run, Liam Boyd kick (Drive: 15 plays, 70 yards, 7:09; Temple 49–14)

Statistics	TEM	CLT
First downs	18	21
Plays–yards	53–384	76–357
Rushes–yards	30–172	47–199
Passing yards	212	158
Passing: comp–att–int	16–23–0	15–29–1
Turnovers	0	3
Time of possession	25:16	34:44

Team	Category	Player	Statistics
Temple	Passing	Evan Simon	15/22, 194 yards, 3 TD
Temple	Rushing	Jay Ducker	9 carries, 114 yards, TD
Temple	Receiving	Kajiya Hollawayne	5 receptions, 85 yards, TD
Charlotte	Passing	Grayson Loftis	10/22, 108 yards, TD, INT
Charlotte	Rushing	Jake Davids	13 carries, 42 yards
Charlotte	Receiving	Javen Nicholas	5 receptions, 50 yards

=== North Texas ===
North Texas Mean Green (6–1) at Charlotte 49ers (1–6) – Game summary

Quarter	1	2	3	4	Total
Mean Green	7	10	10	27	54
49ers	10	7	3	0	20

at Jerry Richardson Stadium • Charlotte, North Carolina

- Date: October 24
- Game time: 7:00 p.m. EDT
- Game weather: Clear • Temperature: 57 °F (14 °C) • Wind: S at 0 miles per hour (0 km/h)
- Game attendance: 9,626
- Referee: Matt Overton
- TV announcers (ESPN2): Mike Corey (play-by-play) and Rene Ingoglia (analyst)

Game information

First quarter

- (12:25) UNT – Cameron Dorner 41-yard pass from Drew Mestemaker, Kali Nguma kick (Drive: 3 plays, 80 yards, 0:50; North Texas 7–0)
- (7:53) CLT – Liam Boyd 24-yard field goal (Drive: 10 plays, 57 yards, 4:26; North Texas 7–3)
- (1:15) CLT – Javen Nicholas 33-yard pass from Grayson Loftis, Liam Boyd kick (Drive: 10 plays, 84 yards, 4:42; Charlotte 10–7)

Second quarter

- (11:27) CLT – Javen Nicholas 64-yard pass from Grayson Loftis, Liam Boyd kick (Drive: 1 play, 65 yards, 0:07; Charlotte 17–7)
- (8:30) UNT – Kali Nguma 29-yard field goal (Drive: 9 plays, 58 yards, 2:49; Charlotte 17–10)
- (4:14) UNT – Caleb Hawkins 6-yard pass from Drew Mestemaker, Kali Nguma kick (Drive: 6 plays, 91 yards, 2:18; Tied 17–17)

Third quarter

- (8:17) CLT – Liam Boyd 20-yard field goal (Drive: 9 plays, 80 yards, 4:06; Charlotte 20–17)
- (5:53) UNT – Kiefer Sibley 1-yard run, Kali Nguma kick (Drive: 6 plays, 75 yards, 2:24; North Texas 24–20)
- (0:17) UNT – Kali Nguma 41-yard field goal (Drive: 5 plays, 20 yards, 1:37; North Texas 27–20)

Fourth quarter

- (12:26) UNT – Caleb Hawkins 7-yard pass from Drew Mestemaker, Kali Nguma kick (Drive: 4 plays, 23 yards, 1:31; North Texas 34–20)
- (9:03) UNT – Wyatt Young 70-yard pass from Drew Mestemaker (Drive: 3 plays, 65 yards, 1:30; North Texas 40–20)
- (7:04) UNT – Kiefer Sibley 45-yard run, Kali Nguma kick (Drive: 2 plays, 49 yards, 0:53; North Texas 47–20)
- (1:06) UNT – Ashton Gray 32-yard run, Kali Nguma kick (Drive: 7 plays, 55 yards, 3:50; North Texas 54–20)

Statistics	UNT	CLT
First downs	32	13
Plays–yards	78–754	63–399
Rushes–yards	29–146	27–104
Passing yards	608	295
Passing: comp–att–int	37–49–1	20–36–0
Turnovers	2	0
Time of possession	30:38	29:22

Team	Category	Player	Statistics
North Texas	Passing	Drew Mestemaker	37/49, 608 yards, 4 TD, INT
North Texas	Rushing	Kiefer Sibley	7 carries, 71 yards, 2 TD
North Texas	Receiving	Wyatt Young	9 receptions, 190 yards, TD
Charlotte	Passing	Grayson Loftis	20/36, 295 yards, 2 TD
Charlotte	Rushing	Jariel Cobb	13 carries, 59 yards
Charlotte	Receiving	Javen Nicholas	7 receptions, 187 yards, 2 TD

=== at East Carolina ===
Charlotte 49ers (1–7) at East Carolina Pirates (5–3) – Game summary

Quarter	1	2	3	4	Total
49ers	0	14	8	0	22
Pirates	21	14	10	3	48

at Dowdy–Ficklen Stadium • Greenville, NC

- Date: November 8
- Game time: 3:00 p.m. EST
- Game weather: Sunny • Temperature: 74 °F (23 °C) • Wind: at 0 miles per hour (0 km/h)
- Game attendance: 39,096
- Referee: Steven Anderson
- TV announcers (ESPN+): Patrick Kinas (play-by-play), Reginald Walker Jr. (analyst) and Savanna Collins (sideline)

Game information

First quarter

- (10:03) ECU – London Montgomery 7-yard run, Nick Mazzie kick (Drive: 12 plays, 65 yards, 4:53; East Carolina 7–0)
- (4:53) ECU – Anthony Smith 3-yard pass from Katin Houser, Nick Mazzie kick (Drive: 9 plays, 51 yards, 3:37; East Carolina 14–0)
- (1:22) ECU – TyMir Brown 45-yard interception return, Nick Mazzie kick (East Carolina 21–0)

Second quarter

- (11:58) ECU – Katin Houser 1-yard run, Nick Mazzie kick (Drive: 8 plays, 68 yards, 2:55; East Carolina 28–0)
- (6:52) CLT – Javen Nicholas 46-yard pass from Grayson Loftis, Liam Boyd kick (Drive: 4 plays, 49 yards, 1:03; East Carolina 28–7)
- (2:24) ECU – Yannick Smith 8-yard pass from Katin Houser, Nick Mazzie kick (Drive: 14 plays, 75 yards, 4:29; East Carolina 35–7)
- (1:31) CLT – Sean Brown 4-yard pass from Grayson Loftis, Liam Boyd kick (Drive: 7 plays, 75 yards, 0:53; East Carolina 35–14)

Third quarter

- (11:00) ECU – Nick Mazzie 40-yard field goal (Drive: 6 plays, 12 yards, 2:26; East Carolina 38–14)
- (8:54) CLT – Javen Nicholas 43-yard pass from Grayson Loftis, Grayson Loftis pass (Drive: 5 plays, 75 yards, 2:06; East Carolina 38–22)
- (6:33) ECU – Katin Houser 11-yard run, Nick Mazzie kick (Drive: 6 plays, 75 yards, 2:16; East Carolina 45–22)

Fourth quarter

- (13:21) ECU – Nick Mazzie 50-yard field goal (Drive: 6 plays, 23 yards, 1:39; East Carolina 48–22)

Statistics	CLT	ECU
First downs	13	29
Plays–yards	64–324	88–407
Rushes–yards	28–40	44–183
Passing yards	284	224
Passing: comp–att–int	21–36–1	26–44–0
Turnovers	2	1
Time of possession	25:58	34:02

Team	Category	Player	Statistics
Charlotte	Passing	Grayson Loftis	20/31, 279 yards, 3 TD, INT
Charlotte	Rushing	Cameren Smith	5 carries, 35 yards
Charlotte	Receiving	Sean Brown	7 receptions, 119 yards, TD
East Carolina	Passing	Katin Houser	26/41, 224 yards, 2 TD
East Carolina	Rushing	London Montgomery	11 carries, 85 yards, TD
East Carolina	Receiving	Anthony Smith	8 receptions, 69 yards, TD

=== UTSA ===
UTSA Roadrunners (4–5) at Charlotte 49ers (1–8) – Game summary

Quarter	1	2	3	4	Total
Roadrunners	7	0	7	14	28
49ers	0	0	0	7	7

at Jerry Richardson Stadium • Charlotte, North Carolina

- Date: November 15
- Game time: 12:00 p.m. EST
- Game weather: Sunny • Temperature: 71 °F (22 °C) • Wind: NE at 8 miles per hour (13 km/h)
- Game attendance: 9,831
- Referee: Matt Overton
- TV announcers (ESPN+): Eric Rothman (play-by-play), Reggie Walker (analyst) and Maria Trivelpiece (sideline)

Game information

First quarter

- (8:34) UTSA – Devin McCuin 45-yard pass from Owen McCown, Michael Petro kick (Drive: 7 plays, 85 yards, 2:08; UTSA 7–0)

Second quarter

- No scoring plays

Third quarter

- (13:22) UTSA – Will Henderson III 59-yard run, Michael Petro kick (Drive: 5 plays, 80 yards, 2:02; UTSA 14–0)

Fourth quarter

- (9:53) UTSA – David Amador II 7-yard pass from Owen McCown, Michael Petro kick (Drive: 6 plays, 52 yards, 2:28; UTSA 21–0)
- (9:40) CLT – Derrick Eley 88-yard kickoff return, Liam Boyd kick (UTSA 21–7)
- (5:46) UTSA – Owen McCown 2-yard run, Michael Petro kick (Drive: 7 plays, 65 yards, 3:54; UTSA 28–7)

Statistics	UTSA	CLT
First downs	29	13
Plays–yards	75–521	58–197
Rushes–yards	38–215	30–51
Passing yards	306	146
Passing: comp–att–int	24–37–1	16–28–1
Turnovers	2	1
Time of possession	31:14	28:46

Team	Category	Player	Statistics
UTSA	Passing	Owen McCown	24/37, 306 yards, 2 TD, INT
UTSA	Rushing	Will Henderson III	19 carries, 185 yards, TD
UTSA	Receiving	Devin McCuin	7 receptions, 100 yards, TD
Charlotte	Passing	Grayson Loftis	13/24, 100 yards
Charlotte	Rushing	Cameren Smith	9 carries, 37 yards
Charlotte	Receiving	Javen Nicholas	6 receptions, 45 yards

=== at No. 4 Georgia ===
Charlotte 49ers (1–9) at No. 4 Georgia Bulldogs (9–1) – Game summary

Quarter	1	2	3	4	Total
49ers	0	3	0	0	3
No. 4 Bulldogs	14	14	7	0	35

at Sanford Stadium • Athens, Georgia

- Date: November 22
- Game time: 12:45 p.m. EST
- Game weather: Cloudy • Temperature: 74 °F (23 °C) • Wind: W at 10 miles per hour (16 km/h)
- Game attendance: 93,033
- Referee: Jason Autrey
- TV announcers (SECN): Taylor Zarzour (play-by-play), Matt Stinchcomb (analyst), and Alyssa Lang (sideline)

Game information

First quarter

- (6:18) UGA – Nate Frazier 2-yard run, Peyton Woodring kick (Drive: 9 plays, 60 yards, 4:31; Georgia 7–0)
- (0:52) UGA – Nate Frazier 7-yard run, Peyton Woodring kick (Drive: 9 plays, 60 yards, 4:26; Georgia 14–0)

Second quarter

- (11:29) UGA – Bo Walker 15-yard run, Peyton Woodring kick (Drive: 6 plays, 40 yards, 3:14; Georgia 21–0)
- (3:27) UGA – Bo Walker 12-yard run, Peyton Woodring kick (Drive: 8 plays, 62 yards, 4:50; Georgia 28–0)
- (0:01) CLT – Liam Boyd 42-yard field goal (Drive: 4 plays, 12 yards, 0:38; Georgia 28–3)

Third quarter

- (11:46) UGA – Bo Walker 3-yard run, Peyton Woodring kick (Drive: 5 plays, 60 yards, 2:12; Georgia 35–3)

Fourth quarter

- No scoring plays.

Statistics	CLT	UGA
First downs	7	30
Plays–yards	44–169	75–449
Rushes–yards	17–39	42–192
Passing yards	130	257
Passing: comp–att–int	14–27–2	25–33–1
Turnovers	2	1
Time of possession	23:06	36:54

Team	Category	Player	Statistics
Charlotte	Passing	Grayson Loftis	14/27, 130 yards, 2 INT
Charlotte	Rushing	Jariel Cobb	7 carries, 26 yards
Charlotte	Receiving	E. Jai Mason	1 reception, 38 yards
Georgia	Passing	Gunner Stockton	17/21, 196 yards, INT
Georgia	Rushing	Nate Frazier	12 carries, 54 yards, 2 TD
Georgia	Receiving	Noah Thomas	4 receptions, 68 yards

=== at No. 24 Tulane ===
Charlotte 49ers (1-10) at No. 24 Tulane Green Wave (9-2) – Game summary

Quarter	1	2	3	4	Total
49ers	0	0	0	0	0
No. 24 Green Wave	14	7	0	6	27

at Yulman Stadium • New Orleans, Louisiana

- Date: November 29
- Game time: 7:30 p.m. EST
- Game weather: Cloudy • Temperature: 64 °F (18 °C) • Wind: SE at 9 miles per hour (14 km/h)
- Game attendance: 22,245
- Referee: Reid Jackson
- TV announcers (ESPNU): Chuckie Kempf (play-by-play) and Darius Walker (analyst)

Game information

First quarter

- (12:34) TULN – Javin Gordon 1-yard run, Patrick Durkin kick (Drive: 7 plays, 65 yards, 2:26; Tulane 7–0)
- (6:13) TULN – Jake Retzlaff 1-yard run, Patrick Durkin kick (Drive: 9 plays, 72 yards, 4:43; Tulane 14–0)

Second quarter

- (1:09) TULN – Jake Retzlaff 1-yard run, Patrick Durkin kick (Drive: 6 plays, 33 yards, 2:14; Tulane 21–0)

Third quarter

- No scoring plays.

Fourth quarter

- (13:54) TULN – Patrick Durkin 36-yard field goal (Drive: 11 plays, 71 yards, 4:48; Tulane 24–0)
- (5:51) TULN – Patrick Durkin 52-yard field goal (Drive: 7 plays, 35 yards, 2:31; Tulane 27–0)

Statistics	CLT	TULN
First downs	7	25
Plays–yards	49–140	74–463
Rushes–yards	21–(-3)	35–151
Passing yards	143	312
Passing: comp–att–int	20–28–2	29–39–2
Turnovers	2	3
Time of possession	25:44	34:16

Team	Category	Player	Statistics
Charlotte	Passing	Grayson Loftis	18/25, 140 yards, INT
Charlotte	Rushing	Cameren Smith	6 carries, 24 yards
Charlotte	Receiving	Sean Brown	5 receptions, 49 yards
Tulane	Passing	Jake Retzlaff	28/38, 291 yards, 2 INT
Tulane	Rushing	Jamauri McClure	11 carries, 69 yards
Tulane	Receiving	Anthony Brown-Stephens	9 receptions, 98 yards

== Personnel ==
=== Coaching staff ===
On December 9, 2024, Ohio head football coach Tim Albin was introduced as the Charlotte 49ers' fourth head coach. On January 7th, Albin announced his first six coaching staff additions. Brian Haines, Nate Faanes, Kurt Mattix, Brian Metz, Bryan Nardo and Allen Rudolph. The next day, January 8th, Todd Fitch was added as associate head coach, defensive coordinator, and quarterbacks coach. On the same day David Denham was named defensive tackles coach. On January 15th Paul Turner and Tre' Bell were added to the staff. On March 19th, Vince Reynolds joined the staff as defensive tackles coach. He replaces Denham, who took a position on the Michigan staff.

Name	Position	Seasons at Charlotte	Alma mater	Previous	Reference
Tim Albin	Head coach	1	NW OK St. (1988)	Head coach (Ohio)	
Todd Fitch	Associate Head coach/Offensive coordinator/Quarterbacks	1	Ohio Wesleyan (1985)	Offensive analyst (LSU)	
Brian Haines	Assistant head coach, Running backs, Special teams	1	Marietta College (2004)	Runningbacks/Special teams coordinator (App. St.)	
Tre' Bell	Cornerbacks/Defensive passing coordinator	1	UConn (2018)	Defensive analyst (WVU)	
Nate Faanes	Defensive coordinator/Linebackers	1	Winona St. (2015)	Co-defensive coordinator (Ohio)	
Kurt Mattix	Co-defensive coordinator/Defensive line	1	Valparaiso (1999)	Defensive ends/Pass rush specialist (Ohio)	
Brian Metz	Tight ends/Recruiting coordinator	1	Notre Dame (2013)	Tight ends/Recruiting coordinator (Ohio)	
Bryan Nardo	Safeties	1	Ohio (2008)	Defensive coordinator (Ok St.)	
Vince Reynolds	Defensive tackles	1	Northern Illinois (2004)	Defensive line coach/Defensive run game coordinator (Arkansas St.)	
Allen Rudolph	Offensive line/Run game coordinator	1	Southern Miss. (1995)	Offensive line (Ohio)	
Paul Turner	Wide receivers/Passing game coordinator	1	LA Tech (2016)	Lead offensive analyst (LSU)	

=== Roster ===
2025 Charlotte 49ers football team roster
Players
Coaches
Offense

Pos.	#	Name	Class
TE	0	Joey Bearns III	RSr
QB	1	Zach Wilcke	RJr
WR	2	Jaylen Hampton	RFr
WR	3	Jayden McGowan	Sr
WR	4	Justin Olson	GS
RB	5	Don Chaney Jr.	RSr
RB	6	Rod Gainey Jr.	RFr
WR	7	E. Jai Mason	GS
WR	8	Sean Brown	GS
WR	9	Javen Nicholas	Jr
WR	10	Ta'ir Brooks	RSr
WR	11	KD Hunter-Gibson	Jr
QB	12	Grayson Loftis	RSo
WR	14	Adam Hopkins IV	RSo
QB	15	Conner Harrell	RJr
QB	16	Luke McNulty	Fr
TE	17	Gus McGee	RSr
RB	21	Henry Rutledge	RSr
RB	23	CJ Stokes	RJr
RB	24	Jariel Cobb	Fr
RB	25	Cameren Smith	Sr
RB	37	Duke Guenther	RFr
RB	41	Jake Davids	RFr
OL	50	Rod Green	RJr
OL	52	Jonny King	RSr
OL	54	Isaac Sikes-Rasby	Fr
OL	55	Mo Clipper Jr.	RJr
OL	56	Andrew Adair	RSr
OL	57	Mason Bowers	RSr
OL	58	Devin Davis	RJr
OL	62	Andrew Cunningham	RFr
OL	65	Boston Brinkley	RJr
OL	66	Omarion Davis	RJr
OL	67	Dom Silvia	RFr
OL	68	Jesse Ramil	RSr
OL	70	Dallas Shirley	RJr
OL	71	Eli Samples	RJr
OL	72	Dominick Kelley	RSo
OL	73	Umar Rockhead	RFr
OL	74	Tyler Gibson	RJr
OL	75	Kristos Fernandez	RSr
OL	76	Isaiah Bullerdick	RJr
WR	80	Jeremiah Hoffman	Fr
TE	80	Grant Laskey	RFr
TE	81	Brady Rhoads	RFr
WR	82	Evan Austin	RFr
TE	85	Jason Jeffares	RSo
TE	86	Connor Adair	RFr
TE	87	Jake Young	RJr
WR	88	Miles Burris	So
WR	89	Derrick Eley	RFr

Defense

Pos.	#	Name	Class
DB	1	Caleb Curtain	RSr
DB	2	Treyveon McGee	GS
DB	3	Collin Gill	RSo
DB	4	Gavin Shipman	RSr
DB	5	Antonio Cotman Jr.	RSo
DB	6	Ja'Qurious Conley	RSr
DL	7	DJ Burgess	RJr
DB	8	Derrick Edwards	RSr
DB	9	Cary Grant	RJr
DL	10	Jorel Liverpool	Sr
DB	11	Dwight Bootle II	RJr
DB	12	CJ Clinkscales	RJr
LB	13	Gavin Willis	Jr
DL	14	Kendal Brown	RFr
DL	15	Macyo Williams	RSr
DB	16	Thai Baldwin	RSr
DB	17	Kameron Manley	RFr
DL	18	Zion Shockley	RSr
LB	19	Kadin Schmitz	Jr
DL	20	Yamil Talib	RFr
DB	21	Breon Noel	RSr
DB	22	DeQuinder Williams II	RFr
DL	23	Darius Wallace	RFr
DL	24	Jaylon Johnson	Jr
DB	25	Dy'Lon Womack	Fr
DB	26	Devon St. Clair	Fr
DB	27	Aydan Cannon	RFr
DB	28	Cornell Allen	RFr
LB	30	Stellan Bowman	So
DB	31	Tyson Craig	Fr
DL	32	Curtis Simpson	RFr
DB	33	Seth Franklin	RSo
LB	35	Shay Taylor	RSr
LB	36	Parker Startz	RFr
LB	40	Reid Williford	Sr
LB	41	Justin Hayes	RSo
LB	42	Jonathon Okate	RJr
DB	43	Randy Franklin	RSr
DL	44	Braden Mullen	RSr
DL	50	Ayo Tifase	RJr
DL	51	Jamarrion Solomon	RJr
DL	55	Cheick Kaba	RSr
DL	58	Xavier Miles	RSo
DL	85	Caleb Irving	RFr
DL	90	Chris Morton	Fr
DL	94	Takeo Massey	Fr
DL	97	Jalar Holley	GS
DL	99	Jaylen Doss	Fr

Special teams

Pos.	#	Name	Class
K	37	Liam Boyd	RJr
LS	39	Colby Garfield	GS
P	44	Ian Kelly	Fr
K	84	Aiden Bui	Fr
P	92	Andrew Bennett	RFr
K	95	Bronson Long	RJr

Head coach

- Tim Albin (Northwestern Oklahoma State)

Coordinators/assistant coaches

- Todd Fitch (Ohio Wesleyan)
  Offensive coordinator/quarterbacks
- Brian Haines (Marietta)
  Special teams coordinator/running backs
- Nate Faanes (Winona State)
  Linebackers
- Kurt Mattix (Valparaiso)
  Defensive line
- Tre' Bell (Connecticut)
  Cornerbacks/defensive pass game coordinator
- Brian Metz (Notre Dame)
  Tight ends/recruiting coordinator
- Bryan Nardo (Ohio)
  Safeties
- Vince Reynolds (Northern Illinois)
  Defensive tackles
- Allen Rudolph (Southern Miss)
  Offensive line/run game coordinator
- Paul Turner (Louisiana Tech)
  Wide receivers/pass game coordinator
- Jake Miller (Baker)
  Director of strength & conditioning

Legend

- (C) Team captain
- (S) Suspended
- (I) Ineligible
- Injured
- Redshirt

Roster

=== Recruiting class ===
The following recruits and transfers have signed letters of intent or verbally committed to the Charlotte 49ers football program for the 2025 recruiting year.

College recruiting
Name	Hometown	School	Height	Weight	40^{‡}	Commit date
D. J. Burgess; DL	Oxford, MS	Northwest Mississippi Community College	6 ft 2 in (1.88 m)	255 lb (116 kg)	–	Dec 29, 2024
D. J. Burgess; DL	Recruit ratings: Rivals: 247Sports:					
Devin Davis; IOL	Suwanee, GA	Butler Community College	6 ft 2 in (1.88 m)	305 lb (138 kg)	–	Dec 15, 2024
Devin Davis; IOL	Recruit ratings: 247Sports: ESPN: (75)					
Omarion Davis; OL	Vero Beach, FL	Iowa Western Community College	6 ft 5 in (1.96 m)	305 lb (138 kg)	–	
Omarion Davis; OL	Recruit ratings: No ratings found					
Jadyn Farmer; DL	Matthews, NC	David W. Butler HS	6 ft 5 in (1.96 m)	275 lb (125 kg)	–	Feb 11, 2024
Jadyn Farmer; DL	Recruit ratings: Rivals: 247Sports: ESPN: (74)					
K.D. Gibson; WR	Tupelo, MS	Northwest Mississippi Community College	6 ft 0 in (1.83 m)	185 lb (84 kg)	–	Dec 24, 2024
K.D. Gibson; WR	Recruit ratings: No ratings found					
Jaylon Johnson; DL	Antioch, TN	Northwest Mississippi Community College	6 ft 4 in (1.93 m)	250 lb (110 kg)	–	
Jaylon Johnson; DL	Recruit ratings: No ratings found					
Nare Means; WR	Cary, NC	Panther Creek HS	5 ft 10 in (1.78 m)	160 lb (73 kg)	–	Jul 8, 2024
Nare Means; WR	Recruit ratings: Rivals: 247Sports:					
Jack Moran; QB	Princeton, NJ	Hun School of Princeton	6 ft 5 in (1.96 m)	215 lb (98 kg)	–	Jun 19, 2024
Jack Moran; QB	Recruit ratings: 247Sports: ESPN: (74)					
Reggie Rainer Jr. CB	Cornelius, NC	William A. Hough HS	5 ft 11 in (1.80 m)	170 lb (77 kg)	–	Jun 24, 2024
Reggie Rainer Jr. CB	Recruit ratings: 247Sports:					
Eli Samples; OL	Cumming, GA	Tyler Junior College	6 ft 5 in (1.96 m)	290 lb (130 kg)	–	
Eli Samples; OL	Recruit ratings: No ratings found					
Devon St. Clair; S	Orlando, FL	Bishop Moore Catholic HS	6 ft 2 in (1.88 m)	192 lb (87 kg)	–	Jan 24, 2025
Devon St. Clair; S	Recruit ratings: Rivals: 247Sports:					
Zach Wilcke; QB	Hernando, MS	Northwest Mississippi Community College	6 ft 3 in (1.91 m)	205 lb (93 kg)	–	Dec 22, 2024
Zach Wilcke; QB	Recruit ratings: No ratings found					
Dy'Lon Womack; DB	Powder Springs, GA	North Cobb	6 ft 0 in (1.83 m)	170 lb (77 kg)	–	
Dy'Lon Womack; DB	Recruit ratings: No ratings found					
			N/A	N/A	–	
Recruit ratings: No ratings found
Overall recruit ranking: Rivals: NA 247Sports: 119 ESPN: NA
‡ Refers to 40-yard dash; Note: In many cases, Scout, Rivals, 247Sports, On3, and ESPN may conflict in their listings of height, weight and 40 time.; In these cases, the average was taken. ESPN grades are on a 100-point scale.; Sources: "Charlotte Football Commitments". Rivals.; "2025 Charlotte Football Commits". Scout.; "ESPN". ESPN.; "Scout.com Team Recruiting Rankings". Scout.; "2025 Team Ranking". Rivals.com.

=== Key transfers ===
Player	Position	Previous	Hometown	High school	Class	Height	Weight
Thailand Baldwin	Cornerback	Ball State	Colonial Heights, VA	Life Christian Academy	RS-JR	5'-11"	170 lbs
Dwight Bootle II	Cornerback	Nebraska	Miami, FL	Miami Killian	RS-FR	5'-10"	180 lbs
Mason Bowers	Defensive lineman	Kennesaw State	High Point, NC	High Point Central	RS-SR	6'-4"	260 lbs
Stellan Bowman	Linebacker	Ohio	Kentwood, MI	East Kentwood	FR	6'-0"	215 lbs
Liam Boyd	Placekicker	North Carolina	Asheville, NC	Asheville	RS-JR	6'-1"	200 lbs
Ta'ir Brooks	Wide receiver	UTEP	Oakland, CA	McClymonds	RS-SR	6'-3"	210 lbs
Don Chaney Jr.	Running back	Louisville	Miami, FL	Belen Jesuit Prep	RS-JR	5'-10"	210 lbs
Jariel Cobb	Running back	North Carolina	Reidsville, NC	Reidsville	FR	5'-10"	185 lbs
Caleb Curtain	Cornerback	Elon	Greensboro, NC	Grimsley	SR	6'-2"	185 lbs
Kristos Fernandez	Offensive lineman	LIU	New Hyde Park, NY	New Hyde Park	RS-SR	6'-5"	300 lbs
Colby Garfield	Long snapper	Ohio	Clemmons, NC	North Davidson	GS	6'-2"	235 lbs
Collin Gill	Cornerback	Georgia	Washington, D.C.	St. John's	RS-FR	6'-0"	190 lbs
Rod Green	Inside offensive lineman	Purdue	Springfield, OH	Springfield	SR	6'-5"	305 lbs
Jaylen Hampton	Wide receiver	Western Kentucky	Bloomingdale, GA	New Hampstead	FR	6'-2"	185 lbs
Conner Harrell	Quarterback	North Carolina	Alabaster, AL	Thompson	RS-SO	6'-1"	191 lbs
Will Hawkins IV	Wide receiver	Miami (FL)	Wake Forest, NC	Palmetto Prep	RS-FR	6'-4"	200 lbs
Caleb Irving	Defensive line	Purdue	Glenn Heights, TX	Parish Episcopal	RS-FR	6'-1"	290 lbs
Cheick Kaba	Defensive lineman	Troy	Minneapolis, MN	Fridley	RS-SR	6'-2"	285 lbs
Jorel Liverpool	Defensive lineman	Wagner	Brooklyn, NY	Midwood	JR	6'-6"	255 lbs
Grayson Loftis	Quarterback	Duke	Greer, SC	Gaffney	SO	6'-2"	205 lbs
E. Jai Mason	Wide receiver	Samford	Jackson, MS	Clinton	SR	6'-1"	205 lbs
Jayden McGowan	Wide receiver	Boston College	Laurens, SC	Laurens District 55	JR	5'-9"	170 lbs
Xavier Miles	Defensive lineman	Syracuse	Jersey City, NJ	St. Peter's Prep	FR	6'-3"	300 lbs
Braden Mullen	Defensive lineman	Dartmouth	Glenview, IL	Loyola Academy	RS-JR	6'-4"	240 lbs
Javen Nicholas	Wide receiver	LSU	New Orleans, LA	St. Augustine	RS-JR	5'-9"	190 lbs
Jesse Ramil	Offensive tackle	Mississippi State	Binghamton, NY	Binghamton	RS-SR	6'-5"	295 lbs
Kadin Schmitz	Linebacker	Ohio	Ashland, OH	Ashland	JR	6'-1"	235 lbs
Gavin Shipman	Cornerback	Harvard	Alabaster, AL	Thompson	SR	5'-10"	170 lbs
Dallas Shirley	Offensive lineman	Newberry	Simpsonville, SC	Hillcrest	RS-SO	6'-4"	290 lbs
Curtis Simpson	Defensive lineman	North Carolina	Shelby, NC	Kings Mountain	RS-FR	6'-4"	230 lbs
Cameren Smith	Running back	Western Illinois	Claymont, DE	Concord	SR	6'-0"	225 lbs
Jamarrion Solomon	Defensive lineman	FIU	Miami, FL	Miami Palmetto	RS-JR	6'-0"	270 lbs
Nate Spillman	Wide receiver	Tennessee	Franklin, TN	Lipscomb Academy	RS-FR	6'-1"	180 lbs
Parker Startz	Linebacker	Ohio	Mokena, IL	Mount Carmel	FR	6'-3"	225 lbs
Yamil Talib	Defensive lineman	Oklahoma State	Dallas, TX	Lloyd V. Berkner	RS-FR	6'-2"	240 lbs
Shay Taylor	Linebacker	Ohio	Mount Perry, OH	Sheridan	RS-SR	6'-3"	235 lbs
Macyo Williams	Defensive lineman	Utah State	Akron, OH	St. Vincent–St. Mary	RS-SR	6'-1"	280 lbs
Gavin Willis	Linebacker	Bucknell	Louisville, KY	Ballard	SO	6'-0"	230 lbs
Jake Young	Tight end	Western Carolina	Waxhaw, NC	Marvin Ridge	RS-SO	6'-2"	240 lbs

=== Departing players ===
==== Outgoing transfers ====
Player	Position	New school
Al-Ma'hi Ali	DB	Western Kentucky
Cornell Allen	CB	Withdrawn
Donta Armstrong	TE	Unknown
Dontae Balfour	CB	Texas Tech
Joey Bearns III	TE	Withdrawn
Zach Billings	LS	Tulane
O'Mega Blake	WR	Arkansas
Adam Booker	LS	Miami (FL)
Jamari Broady	CB	Jackson State
Max Brown	QB	West Virginia
Cam Burden	LB	Memphis
Tanner Bushee	QB	UT Martin
Dre Butler	DL	South Florida
Shadrick Byrd	RB	Prairie View A&M
Tyson Clawson	EDGE	Unknown
Maurice Clipper Jr.	IOL	Unknown
Demon Clowney	EDGE	Louisville
Colin Coates	DL	Mississippi State
Alonzo Colvin	S	Lincoln (PA)
Elijah Culp	CB	James Madison
Kyle Cunanan	K	California
Watson Cusick	RB	Unknown
Kainoa Davis	DL	San Diego State
Lacota Dippre	EDGE	James Madison
KaTron Evans	DL	Marshall
Vasilios Fotopoulos	K	Eastern Kentucky
Nassir Freeman	CB	Long Beach City
Rod Gainey Jr.	RB	Withdrawn
Montez Green	WR	Morehead State
William Hawkins IV	WR	Valparaiso
Jordan Herman	OT	Sacramento State
Aidan Kaler	LB	Stony Brook
Terron Kellman	RB	Wyoming
Jonny King	IOL	Withdrawn
Xander Lamb	WR	Unknown
TeQuan Latimore	S	Florida A&M
Jaavan Mack	CB	Western Kentucky
Jairus Mack	WR	Western Kentucky
Mitchell Mayes	IOL	Withdrawn
Mordecai McDaniel	S	Oklahoma State
Chavon McEachern	RB	Unknown
Treyveon McGee	S	Withdrawn
Seven Miller	LB	Unknown
Avery Morris	LB	Duquesne
Isaiah Myers	WR	Purdue
Maguire Neal	LB	Missouri State
Cartevious Norton	RB	South Florida
Hunter Patrick	K	Unknown
Deshawn Purdie	QB	Wake Forest
Malik Puryear	EDGE	Winston–Salem State
Anthony Romphf	CB	Tulsa
Jack Reynolds	WR	Gardner–Webb
Stephen Rusnak	K	Cincinnati
Henry Rutledge	RB	Withdrawn
Anthony Saragusa	LS	Houston
Jordan Spasojevic-Moko	IOL	California
Donovan Spellman	LB	UNLV
Nate Spillman	WR	Austin Peay
Kendall Stanley	OT	Pittsburgh
Duane Thomas Jr.	WR	UCF
Terez Traynor	WR	Withdrawn
Darius Wallace	LB	Withdrawn
Andre Washington	QB	Alcorn State
Colin Weber	TE	Rutgers
PJ Wilkins	OT	Ole Miss
Hahsaun Wilson	RB	UTEP
