= 2025 South Florida Bulls football team =

American college football season

2025 South Florida Bulls football

Cure Bowl, L 10–24 vs. Old Dominion
- Conference: American Conference
- Record: 9–4 (6–2 American)
- Head coach: Alex Golesh (3rd season; regular season); Kevin Patrick (interim, bowl game)
- Offensive coordinator: Joel Gordon (3rd season)
- Co-offensive coordinator: Kodi Burns (1st season)
- Offensive scheme: Veer and shoot
- Defensive coordinator: Todd Orlando (3rd season)
- Base defense: Multiple 3–3–5
- Home stadium: Raymond James Stadium

2025 American Conference football standings
	Conf.			Overall
Team	W		L	W		L
No. 18 Tulane y$^	7	–	1	11	–	3
No. 24 North Texas y	7	–	1	12	–	2
No. 23 Navy	7	–	1	11	–	2
South Florida	6	–	2	9	–	4
East Carolina	6	–	2	9	–	4
Memphis	4	–	4	8	–	5
Army	4	–	4	7	–	6
UTSA	4	–	4	7	–	6
Temple	3	–	5	5	–	7
Florida Atlantic	3	–	5	4	–	8
Rice	2	–	6	5	–	8
UAB	2	–	6	4	–	8
Tulsa	1	–	7	4	–	8
Charlotte	0	–	8	1	–	11
Championship: Tulane 34, North Texas 21
^ – College Football Playoff participant; $ – Conference champion; y – Championship game participant; Rankings from AP Poll

The 2025 South Florida Bulls football team represented the University of South Florida (USF) as member of the American Conference during the 2025 NCAA Division I FBS football season. Led by third-year head coach Alex Golesh, the Bulls played home games at Raymond James Stadium in Tampa, Florida.

== Offseason ==
=== Transfers ===
==== Outgoing ====
Player	Position	Destination
Andrew Kilfoyl	OL	Bowling Green
Brent Austin	CB	California
Tawfiq Byard	S	Colorado
Ranod Smith	WR	Edward Waters
Chenellson Exume	DL	Florida Atlantic
Abdur-Rahmaan Yaseen	WR	James Madison
Nikola Milovac	OL	Kennesaw State
Trey Dubuc	LS	New Mexico
Israel Carter	QB	Norfolk State
Cooper Evans	K	Northwestern State
Doug Blue-Eli	DL	Rutgers
Langston Long	LB	Toledo
Tyree Kelly	WR	UMass
Aamaris Brown-Bunkley	CB	UNLV
Immanuel Hickman	DE	Virginia Tech
Eli Hiscock	LS	Wagner
John Cannon	K	Western Kentucky
Rashad Cheney	DL	Unknown

==== Incoming ====
Player	Position	Previous school
Thomas Shrader	OL	Appalachian State
Cartevious Norton	RB	Charlotte
Dre Butler	DL	Charlotte
Adam Zouagui	K	Davidson
Jacob Merrifield	DL	Florida Atlantic
Wyatt Sullivan	TE	Florida Atlantic
Izaiah Guy	CB	Georgia State
Chase Leon	P	Lamar
Boogsie Silvera	S	McNeese
Connor McLaughlin	OL	Stanford
Gaston Moore	QB	Tennessee
Chas Nimrod	WR	Tennessee
Turner McLaughlin	LS	Tennessee Tech
Josh Celiscar	DE	Texas A&M
Jonas Duclona	DB	Wisconsin

== Schedule ==
Date	Time	Opponent	Rank	Site	TV	Result	Attendance
August 28	5:30 p.m.	No. 25 Boise State*		Raymond James Stadium; Tampa, FL	ESPN	W 34–7	34,707
September 6	4:15 p.m.	at No. 13 Florida*		Ben Hill Griffin Stadium; Gainesville, FL	SECN	W 18–16	89,909
September 13	4:30 p.m.	at No. 5 Miami (FL)*	No. 18	Hard Rock Stadium; Miami Gardens, FL	The CW	L 12–49	66,591
September 20	12:00 p.m.	South Carolina State*		Raymond James Stadium; Tampa, FL	ESPN+	W 63–14	28,461
October 3	7:00 p.m.	Charlotte		Raymond James Stadium; Tampa, FL	ESPN2	W 54–26	34,577
October 10	7:30 p.m.	at North Texas	No. 24	DATCU Stadium; Denton, TX	ESPN2	W 63–36	31,386
October 18	7:30 p.m.	Florida Atlantic^{†}	No. 19	Raymond James Stadium; Tampa, FL (rivalry)	ESPNU	W 48–13	45,169
October 25	12:00 p.m.	at Memphis	No. 18	Simmons Bank Liberty Stadium; Memphis, TN	ESPN2	L 31–34	30,940
November 6	7:30 p.m.	UTSA		Raymond James Stadium; Tampa, FL (SportsCenter on Campus)	ESPN	W 55–23	27,437
November 15	12:00 p.m.	at Navy	No. 24	Navy–Marine Corps Memorial Stadium; Annapolis, MD	ESPN2	L 38–41	34,856
November 22	3:00 p.m.	at UAB		Protective Stadium; Birmingham, AL	ESPN+	W 48–18	16,376
November 29	6:00 p.m.	Rice		Raymond James Stadium; Tampa, FL	ESPN+	W 52–3	28,813
December 17	5:00 p.m.	vs. Old Dominion*		Camping World Stadium; Orlando, FL (Cure Bowl)	ESPN	L 10–24	15,036
*Non-conference game; ^{†}Homecoming; Rankings from AP Poll (and CFP Rankings, after November 4) - released prior to game; All times are in Eastern time

== Rankings ==
Ranking movements Legend: ██ Increase in ranking ██ Decrease in ranking — = Not ranked RV = Received votes
	Week																
Poll	Pre	1	2	3	4	5	6	7	8	9	10	11	12	13	14	15	Final
AP	—	RV	18	RV	RV	RV	24	19	18	RV	RV	25	RV	RV	RV	RV	—
Coaches	—	RV	23	RV	RV	RV	RV	23	20	RV	RV	RV	—	RV	RV	RV	—
CFP	Not released										—	24	—	—	—	—	Not released

== Game summaries ==
=== No. 25 Boise State ===
No. 25 Boise State Broncos (0–0) at South Florida Bulls (0–0) – Game summary

Quarter	1	2	3	4	Total
No. 25 Broncos	7	0	0	0	7
Bulls	0	10	14	10	34

at Raymond James Stadium • Tampa, Florida

- Date: August 28
- Game time: 5:30 p.m. EDT
- Game weather: Sunny • Temperature: 92 °F (33 °C) • Wind: NW at 8 miles per hour (13 km/h)
- Game attendance: 34,707
- Referee: Nolan Dumas
- TV announcers (ESPN): Matt Barrie (play-by-play), Tom Luginbill (analyst), and Harry Lyles Jr. (sideline)

Game information

First quarter

- (1:10) BOIS – Chris Marshall 6-yard pass from Maddux Madsen, Colton Boomer kick (Drive: 9 plays, 38 yards, 4:35; Boise State 7–0)

Second quarter

- (12:39) USF – Nico Gramatica 52-yard field goal (Drive: 10 plays, 41 yards, 3:31; Boise State 7–3)
- (6:34) USF – Byrum Brown 23-yard run, Nico Gramatica kick (Drive: 8 plays, 80 yards, 3:10; South Florida 10–7)

Third quarter

- (8:18) USF – Keshaun Singleton 45-yard pass from Locklan Hewlett, Nico Gramatica kick (Drive: 4 plays, 49 yards, 1:35; South Florida 17–7)
- (1:44) USF – Byrum Brown 15-yard run, Nico Gramatica kick (Drive: 3 plays, 77 yards, 1:03; South Florida 24–7)

Fourth quarter

- (13:26) USF – Cartevious Norton 8-yard run, Nico Gramatica kick (Drive: 5 plays, 43 yards, 2:09; South Florida 31–7)
- (3:29) USF – Nico Gramatica 33-yard field goal (Drive: 5 plays, 56 yards, 3:05; South Florida 34–7)

Statistics	BOIS	USF
First downs	25	15
Plays–yards	86–378	55–372
Rushes–yards	38–122	28—117
Passing yards	256	255
Passing: comp–att–int	27–48–0	17–25–0
Turnovers	3	0
Time of possession	36:21	23:39

Team	Category	Player	Statistics
Boise State	Passing	Maddux Madsen	25/46, 225 yards, TD
Boise State	Rushing	Sire Gaines	9 carries, 44 yards
Boise State	Receiving	Latrell Caples	4 receptions, 58 yards
South Florida	Passing	Byrum Brown	16/24, 210 yards
South Florida	Rushing	Alvon Isaac	3 carries, 52 yards
South Florida	Receiving	Chas Nimrod	3 receptions, 96 yards

=== at No. 13 Florida ===
South Florida Bulls (1–0) at No. 13 Florida Gators (1–0) – Game summary

Quarter	1	2	3	4	Total
Bulls	0	6	9	3	18
No. 13 Gators	3	6	0	7	16

at Ben Hill Griffin Stadium • Gainesville, Florida

- Date: September 6
- Game time: 4:15 p.m. EDT
- Game weather: Cloudy • Temperature: 90 °F (32 °C) • Wind: NE at 4 miles per hour (6.4 km/h)
- Game attendance: 89,909
- Referee: Steve Marlowe
- TV announcers (SECN): Dave Neal (play-by-play), Fozzy Whittaker (analyst), and Morgan Uber (sideline)

Game information

First quarter

- (5:39) FLA – Trey Smack 28-yard field goal (Drive: 14 plays, 81 yards, 6:12; Florida 3–0)

Second quarter

- (14:52) USF – Nico Gramatica 38-yard field goal (Drive: 15 plays, 55 yards, 5:47; Tied 3–3)
- (7:13) FLA – Trey Smack 36-yard field goal (Drive: 13 plays, 57 yards, 7:39; Florida 6–3)
- (1:50) FLA – Trey Smack 41-yard field goal (Drive: 8 plays, 64 yards, 3:28; Florida 9–3)
- (0:00) USF – Nico Gramatica 25-yard field goal (Drive: 8 plays, 68 yards, 1:50; Florida 9–6)

Third quarter

- (2:03) USF – Keshaun Singleton 66-yard pass from Byrum Brown, Nico Gramatica kick (Drive: 4 plays, 86 yards, 1:10; South Florida 13–9)
- (0:13) USF – Team safety (South Florida 15–9)

Fourth quarter

- (12:29) FLA – Eugene Wilson III 4-yard pass from DJ Lagway, Trey Smack kick (Drive: 5 plays, 20 yards, 1:53; Florida 16–15)
- (0:00) USF – Nico Gramatica 20-yard field goal (Drive: 8 plays, 87 yards, 2:25; South Florida 18–16)

Statistics	USF	FLA
First downs	20	19
Plays–yards	65–391	65–355
Rushes–yards	29–128	32–133
Passing yards	263	222
Passing: comp–att–int	23–36–0	23–33–1
Turnovers	0	1
Time of possession	25:47	34:13

Team	Category	Player	Statistics
South Florida	Passing	Byrum Brown	23/36, 263 yards, TD
South Florida	Rushing	Byrum Brown	17 carries, 66 yards
South Florida	Receiving	Keshaun Singleton	2 receptions, 75 yards, TD
Florida	Passing	DJ Lagway	23/33, 222 yards, TD, INT
Florida	Rushing	Jadan Baugh	18 carries, 93 yards
Florida	Receiving	Eugene Wilson III	7 receptions, 60 yards, TD

=== at No. 5 Miami (FL) ===
No. 18 South Florida Bulls (2–0) at No. 5 Miami Hurricanes (2–0) – Game summary

Quarter	1	2	3	4	Total
No. 18 Bulls	3	3	0	6	12
No. 5 Hurricanes	14	14	7	14	49

at Hard Rock Stadium • Miami Gardens, Florida

- Date: September 13
- Game time: 4:30 p.m. EDT
- Game weather: Cloudy • Temperature: 82 °F (28 °C) • Wind: NE at 3 miles per hour (4.8 km/h)
- Game attendance: 66,591
- Referee: Tim Hedgepeth
- TV announcers (The CW): Thom Brennaman (play-by-play), Will Blackmon (analyst), and Wes Bryant (sideline)

Game information

First quarter

- (9:34) MIA – Joshua Moore 8-yard pass from Carson Beck, Carter Davis kick (Drive: 9 plays, 75 yards, 5:26; Miami 7–0)
- (2:58) MIA – Joshua Moore 39-yard pass from Carson Beck, Carter Davis kick (Drive: 9 plays, 85 yards, 4:31; Miami 14–0)
- (0:26) USF – Nico Gramatica 45-yard field goal (Drive: 7 plays, 48 yards, 2:32; Miami 14–3)

Second quarter

- (11:16) USF – Nico Gramatica 28-yard field goal (Drive: 8 plays, 65 yards, 2:29; Miami 14–6)
- (10:08) MIA – Mark Fletcher Jr. 38-yard run, Carter Davis kick (Drive: 3 plays, 75 yards, 1:11; Miami 21–6)
- (2:33) MIA – Carson Beck 2-yard run, Carter Davis kick (Drive: 6 plays, 25 yards, 3:03; Miami 28–6)

Third quarter

- (0:35) MIA – Mark Fletcher Jr. 13-yard run, Carter Davis kick (Drive: 6 plays, 91 yards, 3:33; Miami 35–6)

Fourth quarter

- (12:48) USF – Christian Neptune 12-yard pass from Byrum Brown, pass failed (Drive: 3 plays, 75 yards, 1:11; Miami 35–12)
- (7:04) MIA – CharMar Brown 1-yard pass from Carson Beck, Carter Davis kick (Drive: 9 plays, 75 yards, 5:44; Miami 42–12)
- (1:48) MIA – Girad Pringle Jr. 5-yard run, Bert Auburn kick (Drive: 7 plays, 57 yards, 2:20; Miami 49–12)

Statistics	USF	MIA
First downs	15	27
Plays–yards	68–332	68–576
Rushes–yards	27–40	38–205
Passing yards	292	371
Passing: comp–att–int	24–41–1	25–30–2
Turnovers	2	2
Time of possession	23:59	36:01

Team	Category	Player	Statistics
South Florida	Passing	Byrum Brown	20/36, 274 yards, TD, INT
South Florida	Rushing	Alvon Isaac	6 carries, 20 yards
South Florida	Receiving	Chas Nimrod	4 receptions, 128 yards
Miami (FL)	Passing	Carson Beck	23/28, 340 yards, 3 TD, 2 INT
Miami (FL)	Rushing	Mark Fletcher Jr.	16 carries, 121 yards, 3 TD
Miami (FL)	Receiving	Keelan Marion	6 receptions, 81 yards

=== South Carolina State (FCS) ===
South Carolina State Bulldogs (FCS) (2–1) at South Florida Bulls (2–1) – Game summary

Quarter	1	2	3	4	Total
Bulldogs (FCS)	0	7	0	7	14
Bulls	7	14	35	7	63

at Raymond James Stadium • Tampa, Florida

- Date: September 20
- Game time: 12:00 p.m. EDT
- Game weather: Sunny • Temperature: 89 °F (32 °C) • Wind: NE at 6 miles per hour (9.7 km/h)
- Game attendance: 28,461
- Referee: Edwin Lee
- TV announcers (ESPN+): Chuckie Kempf (play-by-play), Darius Walker (analyst), and Maria Trivelpiece (sideline)

Game information
First quarter
- USF – Mac Harris 93-yard interception return (Nico Gramatica kick), 9:27. Bulls 7–0.

Second quarter

- USF – Jonathan Echols 22-yard pass from Byrum Brown (Nico Gramatica kick), 13:56. Bulls 14–0. Drive: 8 plays, 67 yards, 2:26.
- USF – Joshua Porter 26-yard pass from Byrum Brown (Nico Gramatica kick), 6:20. Bulls 21–0. Drive: 9 plays, 93 yards, 2:21.
- SCST – Kacy Fields 1-yard run (Nico Cavanillas Alti kick), 0:26. Bulls 21–7. Drive: 5 plays, 27 yards, 1:30.

Third quarter

- USF – Chas Nimrod 42-yard pass from Byrum Brown (Nico Gramatica kick), 13:53. Bulls 28–7. Drive: 5 plays, 53 yards, 0:59.
- USF – Nykahi Davenport 43-yard run (Nico Gramatica kick), 12:49. Bulls 35–7. Drive: 1 play, 43 yards, 0:08.
- USF – Ashton Mosley 4-yard blocked punt return (Nico Gramatica kick), 9:16. Bulls 42–7.
- USF – Chas Nimrod 22-yard pass from Byrum Brown (Nico Gramatica kick), 6:40. Bulls 49–7. Drive: 3 plays, 65 yards, 0:56.
- USF – Sam Franklin 30-yard run (Adam Zouagui kick), 5:28. Bulls 56–7. Drive: 1 play, 30 yards, 0:08.

Fourth quarter

- SCST – Julian Milligan 17-yard run (Nico Cavanillas Alti kick), 8:02. Bulls 56–14. Drive: 4 plays, 46 yards, 1:11.
- USF – Sam Franklin 54-yard run (Adam Zouagui kick), 6:28. Bulls 63–14. Drive: 5 plays, 68 yards, 1:27.

Statistics	SCST	USF
First downs	20	20
Plays–yards	80–305	54–504
Rushes–yards	38–70	28–252
Passing yards	235	252
Passing: comp–att–int	25–42–1	18–26–1
Turnovers	1	1
Time of possession	43:07	16:53

Team	Category	Player	Statistics
South Carolina State	Passing	William Atkins IV	18/28, 151 yards
South Carolina State	Rushing	Kacy Fields	7 carries, 24 yards, TD
South Carolina State	Receiving	Deyandre Ruffin	4 receptions, 41 yards
South Florida	Passing	Byrum Brown	14/20, 236 yards, 4 TD, INT
South Florida	Rushing	Sam Franklin	4 carries, 91 yards, 2 TD
South Florida	Receiving	Chas Nimrod	4 receptions, 119 yards, 2 TD

=== Charlotte ===
Charlotte 49ers (1–3) at South Florida Bulls (3–1) – Game summary

Quarter	1	2	3	4	Total
49ers	0	7	3	16	26
Bulls	23	10	0	21	54

at Raymond James Stadium • Tampa, Florida

- Date: October 3
- Game time: 7:00 p.m. EDT
- Game weather: Sunny • Temperature: 86 °F (30 °C) • Wind: NE at 12 miles per hour (19 km/h)
- Game attendance: 34,577
- Referee: Tim Rich
- TV announcers (ESPN2): Courtney Lyle (play-by-play), Rene Ingoglia (analyst), and Marilyn Payne (sideline)

Game information

First quarter

- (14:01) USF – Cartevious Norton 37-yard run, Nico Gramatica kick (Drive: 6 plays, 75 yards, 0:59; South Florida 7–0)
- (7:07) USF – Jeremiah Koger 38-yard pass from Byrum Brown, Nico Gramatica kick (Drive: 7 plays, 77 yards, 2:18; South Florida 14–0)
- (5:23) USF – Team safety (South Florida 16–0)
- (1:03) USF – Mudia Reuben 10-yard pass from Byrum Brown, Nico Gramatica kick (Drive: 6 plays, 40 yards, 1:37; South Florida 23–0)

Second quarter

- (14:15) USF – Nico Gramatica 43-yard field goal (Drive: 4 plays, 5 yards, 1:04; South Florida 26–0)
- (3:44) CLT – CJ Stokes 1-yard run, Liam Boyd kick (Drive: 3 plays, 34 yards, 1:08; South Florida 26–7)
- (1:10) USF – Chas Nimrod 18-yard pass from Byrum Brown, Nico Gramatica kick (Drive: 10 plays, 75 yards, 2:34; South Florida 33–7)

Third quarter

- (9:39) CLT – Liam Boyd 33-yard field goal (Drive: 10 plays, 60 yards, 5:21; South Florida 33–10)

Fourth quarter

- (13:58) CLT – E. Jai Mason 2-yard pass from Zach Wilcke, Jake Young pass (Drive: 3 plays, 4 yards, 0:52; South Florida 33–18)
- (9:11) USF – Evan Dangler 1-yard pass from Byrum Brown, Nico Gramatica kick (Drive: 13 plays, 65 yards, 4:47; South Florida 40–18)
- (6:48) USF – Byrum Brown 13-yard run, Nico Gramatica kick (Drive: 7 plays, 53 yards, 2:17; South Florida 47–18)
- (3:10) CLT – Derrick Eley 16-yard pass from Zach Wilcke, Jake Young pass (Drive: 9 plays, 75 yards, 3:38; South Florida 47–26)
- (0:43) USF – Nykahi Davenport 7-yard run, Nico Gramatica kick (Drive: 8 plays, 43 yards, 2:26; South Florida 54–26)

Statistics	CLT	USF
First downs	15	36
Plays–yards	62–279	97–631
Rushes–yards	33–130	62–407
Passing yards	149	224
Passing: comp–att–int	16–29–2	20–35–2
Turnovers	4	4
Time of possession	28:14	31:46

Team	Category	Player	Statistics
Charlotte	Passing	Zach Wilcke	14/18, 150 yards, 2 TD, INT
Charlotte	Rushing	CJ Stokes	13 carries, 54 yards, TD
Charlotte	Receiving	Sean Brown	4 receptions, 58 yards
South Florida	Passing	Byrum Brown	19/34, 211 yards, 4 TD, 2 INT
South Florida	Rushing	Byrum Brown	17 carries, 162 yards, TD
South Florida	Receiving	Jeremiah Koger	4 receptions, 75 yards, TD

=== at North Texas ===
No. 24 South Florida Bulls (4–1) at North Texas Mean Green (5–0) – Game summary

Quarter	1	2	3	4	Total
No. 24 Bulls	7	14	28	14	63
Mean Green	14	7	7	8	36

at DATCU Stadium • Denton, Texas

- Date: October 10
- Game time: 7:30 p.m. EDT
- Game weather: Sunny • Temperature: 84 °F (29 °C) • Wind: E at 2 miles per hour (3.2 km/h)
- Game attendance: 31,386
- Referee: Kevin Randall
- TV announcers (ESPN2): Anish Shroff (play-by-play), Andre Ware (analyst), and Paul Carcaterra (sideline)

Game information

First quarter

- (8:42) UNT – Drew Mestemaker 2-yard run, Kali Nguma kick (Drive: 8 plays, 40 yards, 4:00; North Texas 7–0)
- (2:41) USF – Byrum Brown 7-yard run, Nico Gramatica kick (Drive: 8 plays, 59 yards, 2:09; Tied 7–7)
- (0:12) UNT – Makenzie McGill II 23-yard run, Kali Nguma kick (Drive: 6 plays, 75 yards, 2:26; North Texas 14–7)

Second quarter

- (9:37) USF – Jeremiah Koger 14-yard pass from Byrum Brown, Nico Gramatica kick (Drive: 12 plays, 76 yards, 3:54; Tied 14–14)
- (6:12) UNT – Wyatt Young 11-yard run, Kali Nguma kick (Drive: 9 plays, 65 yards, 3:25; North Texas 21–14)
- (0:02) USF – Jonathan Echols 2-yard pass from Byrum Brown, Nico Gramatica kick (Drive: 5 plays, 17 yards, 0:41; Tied 21–21)

Third quarter

- (13:51) USF – Keshaun Singleton 29-yard pass from Christian Neptune, Nico Gramatica kick (Drive: 4 plays, 75 yards, 1:09; South Florida 28–21)
- (12:35) USF – Sam Franklin 11-yard run, Nico Gramatica kick (Drive: 2 plays, 15 yards, 0:24; South Florida 35–21)
- (11:35) USF – Jhalyn Shuler 34-yard fumble recovery, Nico Gramatica kick (South Florida 42–21)
- (9:35) UNT – Miles Coleman 54-yard pass from Drew Mestemaker, Kali Nguma kick (Drive: 4 plays, 68 yards, 1:55; South Florida 42–28)
- (8:14) USF – Jeremiah Koger 63-yard pass from Byrum Brown, Nico Gramatica kick (Drive: 5 plays, 86 yards, 1:16; South Florida 49–28)

Fourth quarter

- (13:49) USF – Cole Skinner 1-yard run, Nico Gramatica kick (Drive: 10 plays, 49 yards, 2:53; South Florida 56–28)
- (8:15) UNT – Tre Williams III 10-yard pass from Drew Mestemaker, Dalton Carnes pass (Drive: 14 plays, 75 yards, 5:34; South Florida 56–36)
- (5:51) USF – Byrum Brown 9-yard run, Nico Gramatica kick (Drive: 4 plays, 44 yards, 2:01; South Florida 63–36)

Statistics	USF	UNT
First downs	32	26
Plays–yards	86–580	78–423
Rushes–yards	57–306	29–97
Passing yards	274	326
Passing: comp–att–int	23–29–1	30–49–3
Turnovers	3	5
Time of possession	29:05	30:55

Team	Category	Player	Statistics
South Florida	Passing	Byrum Brown	22/28, 245 yards, 3 TD, INT
South Florida	Rushing	Byrum Brown	21 carries, 82 yards, 2 TD
South Florida	Receiving	Jeremiah Koger	4 receptions, 94 yards, 2 TD
North Texas	Passing	Drew Mestemaker	30/48, 326 yards, 2 TD, 3 INT
North Texas	Rushing	Caleb Hawkins	15 carries, 49 yards
North Texas	Receiving	Miles Coleman	7 receptions, 101 yards, TD

=== Florida Atlantic ===
Florida Atlantic Owls (3–3) at No. 19 South Florida Bulls (5–1) – Game summary

Quarter	1	2	3	4	Total
Owls	3	3	7	0	13
No. 19 Bulls	7	14	10	17	48

at Raymond James Stadium • Tampa, Florida

- Date: October 18
- Game time: 7:30 p.m. EDT
- Game weather: Cloudy • Temperature: 80 °F (27 °C) • Wind: SE at 7 miles per hour (11 km/h)
- Game attendance: 45,169
- Referee: Matt Overton
- TV announcers (ESPNU): Jack Kizer (play-by-play) and Craig Haubert (analyst)

Game information

First quarter

- (11:46) USF – Byrum Brown 22-yard run, Nico Gramatica kick (Drive: 12 plays, 75 yards, 3:14; South Florida 7–0)
- (5:53) FAU – Garrison Smith 45-yard field goal (Drive: 14 plays, 51 yards, 5:48; South Florida 7–3)

Second quarter

- (12:00) USF – Jonathan Echols 19-yard pass from Byrum Brown, Nico Gramatica kick (Drive: 7 plays, 75 yards, 2:48; South Florida 14–3)
- (9:40) USF – Cole Skinner 1-yard run, Nico Gramatica kick (Drive: 7 plays, 35 yards, 2:17; South Florida 21–3)
- (0:00) FAU – Garrison Smith 28-yard field goal (Drive: 14 plays, 45 yards, 4:28; South Florida 21–6)

Third quarter

- (12:12) FAU – Michael Kirch 3-yard pass from Caden Veltkamp, Garrison Smith kick (Drive: 7 plays, 75 yards, 2:48; South Florida 21–13)
- (8:20) USF – Nico Gramatica 41-yard field goal (Drive: 5 plays, 41 yards, 1:27; South Florida 24–13)
- (4:10) USF – Wyatt Sullivan 24-yard pass from Byrum Brown, Nico Gramatica kick (Drive: 7 plays, 70 yards, 2:00; South Florida 31–13)

Fourth quarter

- (13:39) USF – Jeremiah Koger 60-yard pass from Byrum Brown, Nico Gramatica kick (Drive: 6 plays, 93 yards, 1:31; South Florida 38–13)
- (9:05) USF – Nykahi Davenport 2-yard run, Nico Gramatica kick (Drive: 5 plays, 45 yards, 2:04; South Florida 45–13)
- (2:50) USF – Nico Gramatica 28-yard field goal (Drive: 9 plays, 21 yards, 5:08; South Florida 48–13)

Statistics	FAU	USF
First downs	25	26
Plays–yards	88–312	76–522
Rushes–yards	30–23	51–259
Passing yards	289	263
Passing: comp–att–int	41–58–1	15–25–0
Turnovers	1	0
Time of possession	31:26	28:34

Team	Category	Player	Statistics
Florida Atlantic	Passing	Caden Veltkamp	35/50, 244 yards, TD, INT
Florida Atlantic	Rushing	Kaden Shields-Dutton	7 carries, 25 yards
Florida Atlantic	Receiving	Asaad Waseem	8 receptions, 56 yards
South Florida	Passing	Byrum Brown	14/24, 256 yards, 3 TD
South Florida	Rushing	Byrum Brown	14 carries, 111 yards, TD
South Florida	Receiving	Jeremiah Koger	4 receptions, 90 yards, TD

=== at Memphis ===
No. 18 South Florida Bulls (6–1) at Memphis Tigers (6–1) – Game summary

Quarter	1	2	3	4	Total
No. 18 Bulls	14	10	7	0	31
Tigers	7	7	3	17	34

at Simmons Bank Liberty Stadium • Memphis, Tennessee

- Date: October 25
- Game time: 12:00 p.m. EDT
- Game weather: Cloudy • Temperature: 65 °F (18 °C) • Wind: SE at 11 miles per hour (18 km/h)
- Game attendance: 30,940
- Referee: Charles Lamertina
- TV announcers (ESPN2): Matt Schumacker (play-by-play), Sam Acho (analyst), and Taylor Davis (sideline)

Game information

First quarter

- (13:03) MEM – Frank Peasant 19-yard run, Gianni Spetic kick (Drive: 3 plays, 28 yards, 0:55; Memphis 7–0)
- (8:31) USF – Byrum Brown 3-yard run, Nico Gramatica kick (Drive: 12 plays, 75 yards, 4:32; Tied 7–7)
- (1:10) USF – Byrum Brown 44-yard run, Nico Gramatica kick (Drive: 7 plays, 92 yards, 2:45; South Florida 14–7)

Second quarter

- (4:21) USF – Jeremiah Koger 5-yard pass from Byrum Brown, Nico Gramatica kick (Drive: 8 plays, 92 yards, 2:44; South Florida 21–7)
- (0:50) MEM – Cortez Braham Jr. 5-yard pass from Brendon Lewis, Gianni Spetic kick (Drive: 11 plays, 75 yards, 3:31; South Florida 21–14)
- (0:00) USF – Nico Gramatica 46-yard field goal (Drive: 8 plays, 47 yards, 0:50; South Florida 24–14)

Third quarter

- (9:51) MEM – Gianni Spetic 55-yard field goal (Drive: 10 plays, 38 yards, 5:09; South Florida 24–17)
- (0:02) USF – Sam Franklin 73-yard run, Nico Gramatica kick (Drive: 1 play, 73 yards, 0:12; South Florida 31–17)

Fourth quarter

- (13:13) MEM – Greg Desrosiers Jr. 13-yard run (Drive: 8 plays, 75 yards, 1:49; South Florida 31–23)
- (7:08) MEM – Gianni Spetic 28-yard field goal (Drive: 9 plays, 81 yards, 3:57; South Florida 31–26)
- (1:07) MEM – Cortez Braham Jr. 10-yard pass from Brendon Lewis, Brendon Lewis rush (Drive: 11 plays, 70 yards, 3:51; Memphis 34–31)

Statistics	USF	MEM
First downs	29	30
Plays–yards	82–564	79–450
Rushes–yards	38–295	34–129
Passing yards	269	321
Passing: comp–att–int	26–44–1	28–45–0
Turnovers	1	0
Time of possession	26:08	33:52

Team	Category	Player	Statistics
South Florida	Passing	Byrum Brown	26/43, 269 yards, TD, INT
South Florida	Rushing	Byrum Brown	21 carries, 121 yards, 2 TD
South Florida	Receiving	Keshaun Singleton	7 receptions, 88 yards
Memphis	Passing	Brendon Lewis	27/44, 307 yards, 2 TD
Memphis	Rushing	Brendon Lewis	11 carries, 35 yards
Memphis	Receiving	Jamari Hawkins	3 receptions, 85 yards

=== UTSA ===
UTSA Roadrunners (4-4) at South Florida Bulls (6–2) – Game summary

Quarter	1	2	3	4	Total
Roadrunners	3	7	3	10	23
Bulls	14	31	10	0	55

at Raymond James Stadium • Tampa, Florida

- Date: November 6
- Game time: 7:30 p.m. EST
- Game weather: Cloudy • Temperature: 72 °F (22 °C) • Wind: NE at 2 miles per hour (3.2 km/h)
- Game attendance: 27,437
- Referee: Edwin Lee
- TV announcers (ESPN): Matt Barrie (play-by-play), Tom Luginbill (analyst), and Harry Lyles Jr. (sideline)

Game information

First quarter

- (14:52) USF – Tavin Ward 40-yard interception, Nico Gramatica kick (South Florida 7–0)
- (7:06) USF – Fred Gaskin 85-yard fumble recovery, Nico Gramatica kick (South Florida 14–0)
- (2:07) UTSA – Michael Petro 33-yard field goal (Drive: 7 plays, 12 yards, 2:17; South Florida 14–3)

Second quarter

- (14:55) USF – Byrum Brown 13-yard run, Nico Gramatica kick (Drive: 6 plays, 65 yards, 2:12; South Florida 21–3)
- (13:46) UTSA – Patrick Overmyer 45-yard pass from Owen McCown, Michael Petro kick (Drive: 3 plays, 75 yards, 1:09; South Florida 21–10)
- (12:21) USF – Keshaun Singleton 16-yard pass from Byrum Brown, Nico Gramatica kick (Drive: 5 plays, 75 yards, 1:25; South Florida 28–10)
- (10:15) USF – Nykahi Davenport 59-yard run, Nico Gramatica kick (Drive: 2 plays, 65 yards, 0:32; South Florida 35–10)
- (5:35) USF – Keshaun Singleton 16-yard pass from Byrum Brown, Nico Gramatica kick (Drive: 5 plays, 77 yards, 1:30; South Florida 42–10)
- (0:00) USF – Nico Gramatica 40-yard field goal (Drive: 6 plays, 58 yards, 1:46; South Florida 45–10)

Third quarter

- (11:56) USF – Nykahi Davenport 7-yard run, Nico Gramatica kick (Drive: 8 plays, 75 yards, 3:04; South Florida 52–10)
- (5:09) UTSA – Michael Petro 39-yard field goal (Drive: 9 plays, 48 yards, 4:45; South Florida 52–13)
- (2:28) USF – Nico Gramatica 51-yard field goal (Drive: 7 plays, 42 yards, 2:41; South Florida 55–13)

Fourth quarter

- (8:17) UTSA – Mekhi Anderson 19-yard pass from Brandon Tennison, Michael Petro kick (Drive: 15 plays, 55 yards, 6:36; South Florida 55–20)
- (2:46) UTSA – Michael Petro 27-yard field goal (Drive: 9 plays, 35 yards, 3:17; South Florida 55–23)

Statistics	UTSA	USF
First downs	25	20
Plays–yards	82–381	50–471
Rushes–yards	38–72	32–238
Passing yards	309	233
Passing: comp–att–int	29–44–1	16–18–0
Turnovers	2	1
Time of possession	39:47	20:13

Team	Category	Player	Statistics
UTSA	Passing	Owen McCown	16/23, 200 yards, TD, INT
UTSA	Rushing	Robert Henry	10 carries, 27 yards
UTSA	Receiving	Houston Thomas	7 receptions, 77 yards
South Florida	Passing	Byrum Brown	14/15, 239 yards, 2 TD
South Florida	Rushing	Byrum Brown	9 carries, 109 yards, TD
South Florida	Receiving	Keshaun Singleton	4 receptions, 122 yards, 2 TD

=== at Navy ===
No. 24 South Florida Bulls (7–2) at Navy Midshipmen (7–2) – Game summary

Quarter	1	2	3	4	Total
No. 24 Bulls	3	6	7	22	38
Midshipmen	14	10	0	17	41

at Navy–Marine Corps Memorial Stadium • Annapolis, Maryland

- Date: November 15
- Game time: 12:00 p.m. EST
- Game weather: Cloudy • Temperature: 54 °F (12 °C) • Wind: S at 5 miles per hour (8.0 km/h)
- Game attendance: 34,856
- Referee: Tim Rich
- TV announcers (ESPN2): Roy Philpott (play-by-play), Sam Acho (analyst), and Taylor Davis (sideline)

Game information

First quarter

- (9:58) NAVY – Alex Tecza 76-yard run, Nathan Kirkwood kick (Drive: 5 plays, 88 yards, 1:53, Navy 7–0)
- (6:40) USF – Nico Gramatica 22-yard field goal (Drive: 7 plays, 77 yards, 3:07, Navy 7–3)
- (0:00) NAVY – Brandon Chatman 4-yard run, Nathan Kirkwood kick (Drive: 3 plays, 89 yards, 1:10, Navy 14–3)

Second quarter

- (12:53) USF – Keshaun Singleton 12-yard pass from Byrum Brown (Drive: 5 plays, 75 yards, 2:07, Navy 14–9)
- (7:00) NAVY – Alex Tecza 14-yard pass from Blake Horvath, Nathan Kirkwood kick (Drive: 4 plays, 44 yards, 1:56, Navy 21–9)
- (4:30) NAVY – Nathan Kirkwood 44-yard field goal (Drive: 4 plays, -11 yards, 1:55, Navy 24–9)

Third quarter

- (12:32) USF – Byrum Brown 3-yard run, Nico Gramatica kick (Drive: 4 plays, 68 yards, 1:05, Navy 24–16)

Fourth quarter

- (14:17) NAVY – Nathan Kirkwood 44-yard field goal (Drive: 9 plays, 38 yards, 4:28, Navy 27–16)
- (13:59) USF – Byrum Brown 60-yard run, Mudia Reuben pass (Drive: 1 play, 75 yards, 0:18, Navy 27–24)
- (9:29) NAVY – Braxton Woodson 20-yard run, Nathan Kirkwood kick (Drive: 8 plays, 75 yards, 4:30, Navy 34–24)
- (6:14) USF – Jeremiah Koger 29-yard pass from Nykahi Davenport (Drive: 11 plays, 83 yards, 3:09, Navy 34–30)
- (3:59) NAVY – Braxton Woodson 64-yard run, Nathan Kirkwood kick (Drive: 4 plays, 75 yards, 2:15, Navy 41–30)
- (1:55) USF – Mudia Reuben 41-yard pass from Byrum Brown, Keshaun Singleton pass (Drive: 6 plays, 75 yards, 2:04, Navy 41–38)

Statistics	USF	NAVY
First downs	23	21
Plays–yards	69–556	72–524
Rushes–yards	36–200	53–338
Passing yards	356	186
Passing: comp–att–int	24–33–1	10–19–0
Turnovers	2	1
Time of possession	24:49	3511

Team	Category	Player	Statistics
South Florida	Passing	Byrum Brown	23/32, 327 yards, 2 TD, INT
South Florida	Rushing	Byrum Brown	17 carries, 136 yards, 2 TD
South Florida	Receiving	Jeremiah Koger	9 receptions, 112 yards
Navy	Passing	Blake Horvath	8/15, 147 yards, TD
Navy	Rushing	Alex Tecza	12 carries, 126 yards, TD
Navy	Receiving	Eli Heidenreich	5 receptions, 146 yards

=== at UAB ===
South Florida Bulls (7–3) at UAB Blazers (3–7) – Game summary

Quarter	1	2	3	4	Total
Bulls	7	10	17	14	48
Blazers	10	0	0	8	18

at Protective Stadium • Birmingham, Alabama

- Date: November 22
- Game time: 3:00 p.m. EST
- Game attendance: 16,376
- Referee: Edwin Lee
- TV announcers (ESPN+): Pete Sousa (play-by-play) and Forrest Conoly (analyst)

Game information

First quarter

- USF – Byrum Brown 1-yard run (Nico Gramatica kick), 11:47. Bulls 7–0. Drive: 3 plays, 36 yards, 0:55.
- UAB – Jonah Delange 30-yard field goal, 8:30. Bulls 7–3. Drive: 7 plays, 12 yards, 3:06.
- UAB – Isaiah Jacobs 6-yard run (Jonah Delange kick), 1:16. Blazers 10–7. Drive: 7 plays, 85 yards, 4:14.

Second quarter

- USF – Wyatt Sullivan 6-yard pass from Byrum Brown (Nico Gramatica kick), 4:32. Bulls 14–10. Drive: 10 plays, 96 yards, 4:18.
- USF – Nico Gramatica 49-yard field goal, 1:13. Bulls 17–10. Drive: 9 plays, 32 yards, 1:52.

Third quarter

- USF – Mudia Reuben 60-yard pass from Byrum Brown (Nico Gramatica kick), 14:38. Bulls 24–10. Drive: 1 play, 60 yards, 0:15.
- USF – Nico Gramatica 43-yard field goal, 7:59. Bulls 27–10. Drive: 5 plays, 55 yards, 2:37.
- USF – Nykahi Davenport 2-yard run (Nico Gramatica kick), 4:04. Bulls 34–10. Drive: 4 plays, 45 yards, 0:51.

Fourth quarter

- UAB – Solomon Beebe 3-yard run (Ryder Burton run), 14:04. Bulls 34–18. Drive: 8 plays, 75 yards, 3:42.
- USF – Mudia Reuben 59-yard pass from Byrum Brown (Nico Gramatica kick), 12:09. Bulls 41–18. Drive: 5 plays, 75 yards, 1:55.
- USF – Byrum Brown 2-yard run (Nico Gramatica kick), 1:42. Bulls 48–18. Drive: 11 plays, 99 yards, 4:16.

Statistics	USF	UAB
First downs	24	27
Plays–yards	59–544	83–382
Rushes–yards	34–191	43–131
Passing yards	353	251
Passing: comp–att–int	19–25–0	21–40–3
Turnovers	1	3
Time of possession	21:52	38:08

Team	Category	Player	Statistics
South Florida	Passing	Byrum Brown	19/25, 353 yards, 3 TD
South Florida	Rushing	Nykahi Davenport	17 carries, 121 yards, TD
South Florida	Receiving	Mudia Reuben	5 receptions, 174 yards, 2 TD
UAB	Passing	Jalen Kitna	20/36, 230 yards, 3 INT
UAB	Rushing	Isaiah Jacobs	6 carries, 38 yards, TD
UAB	Receiving	Iverson Hooks	10 receptions, 146 yards

=== Rice ===
Rice Owls (5–6) at South Florida Bulls (8–3) – Game summary

Quarter	1	2	3	4	Total
Owls	0	3	0	0	3
Bulls	14	14	10	14	52

at Raymond James Stadium • Tampa, Florida

- Date: November 29
- Game time: 7:00 p.m. EST
- Game attendance: 28,813
- Referee: Matt Overton
- TV announcers (ESPN+): Eric Rothman (play-by-play), Patrick Murray Jr. (analyst), and Savanna Collins (sideline)

Game information

First quarter

- USF – Keshaun Singleton 5-yard pass from Byrum Brown (Nico Gramatica kick), 9:25. Bulls 7–0. Drive: 12 plays, 68 yards, 3:24.
- USF – Keshaun Singleton 47-yard pass from Byrum Brown (Nico Gramatica kick), 2:59. Bulls 14–0. Drive: 4 plays, 77 yards, 1:11.

Second quarter

- USF – Mudia Reuben 60-yard pass from Byrum Brown (Nico Gramatica kick), 11:21. Bulls 21–0. Drive: 6 plays, 80 yards, 1:27.
- USF – Nykahi Davenport 2-yard run (Nico Gramatica kick), 6:54. Bulls 28–0. Drive: 7 plays, 67 yards, 2:24.
- RICE – Enock Gota 44-yard field goal, 0:00. Bulls 28–3. Drive: 12 plays, 54 yards, 3:34.

Third quarter

- USF – Jeremiah Koger 7-yard pass from Byrum Brown (Nico Gramatica kick), 10:13. Bulls 35–3. Drive: 11 plays, 75 yards, 4:47.
- USF – Nico Gramatica 23-yard field goal, 1:41. Bulls 38–3. Drive: 14 plays, 80 yards, 5:16.

Fourth quarter

- USF – Byrum Brown 5-yard run (Nico Gramatica kick), 14:39. Bulls 45–3. Drive: 4 plays, 50 yards, 1:05.
- USF – Christian Helms 3-yard pass from Gaston Moore (Adam Zouagui kick), 8:33. Bulls 52–3. Drive: 9 plays, 61 yards, 3:35.

Statistics	RICE	USF
First downs	13	30
Plays–yards	58–257	77–553
Rushes–yards	40–153	49–272
Passing yards	104	281
Passing: comp–att–int	9–18–0	18–28–0
Turnovers	1	0
Time of possession	31:22	28:38

Team	Category	Player	Statistics
Rice	Passing	Drew Devillier	3/9, 65 yards
Rice	Rushing	Tyvonn Byars	6 carries, 46 yards
Rice	Receiving	Aaron Turner	7 receptions, 99 yards
South Florida	Passing	Byrum Brown	16/24, 275 yards, 4 TD
South Florida	Rushing	Byrum Brown	15 carries, 104 yards, TD
South Florida	Receiving	Keshaun Singleton	6 receptions, 125 yards, 2 TD

=== vs. Old Dominion (Cure Bowl) ===
2025 StaffDNA Cure Bowl
Old Dominion Monarchs (9–3) vs. South Florida Bulls (9–3) – Game summary

Quarter	1	2	3	4	Total
Monarchs	7	10	0	7	24
Bulls	3	7	0	0	10

at Camping World Stadium • Orlando, Florida

- Date: December 17
- Game time: 5:00 p.m. EST
- Game weather: Cloudy • Temperature: 72 °F (22 °C) • Wind: E 10 mph
- Game attendance: 15,036
- Referee: Ron Hudson
- TV announcers (ESPN): Dave Neal (play-by-play), Fozzy Whittaker (analyst) and Morgan Uber (sideline)

Game information

First quarter

- (5:18) USF – Nico Gramatica 28-yard field goal (Drive: 8 plays, 31 yards, 2:03; South Florida 3–0)
- (0:42) ODU – Quinn Henicle 6-yard run, Nathanial Eichner kick (Drive: 10 plays, 75 yards, 4:36; Old Dominion 7–3)

Second quarter

- (7:24) USF – Jeremiah Kroger 31-yard pass from Gaston Moore, Nico Gramatica kick (Drive: 3 plays, 55 yards, 1:03; South Florida 10–7)

Third quarter

- (10:06) ODU – Trequan Jones 22-yard run, Nathanial Eichner kick (Drive: 3 plays, 25 yards, 0:38; Old Dominion 14–10)
- (3:27) ODU – Nathanial Eichner 24-yard field goal (Drive: 10 plays, 73 yards, 4:13; Old Dominion 17–10)

Fourth quarter

- (2:24) ODU – Quinn Henicle 51-yard run, Nathanial Eichner kick (Drive: 4 plays, 57 yards, 1:15; Old Dominion 24–10)

Statistics	ODU	USF
First downs	21	19
Plays–yards	81–382	76–333
Rushes–yards	55–255	35–52
Passing yards	127	281
Passing: Comp–Att–Int	11–26–0	27–41–4
Turnovers	1	5
Time of possession	31:07	28:53

Team	Category	Player	Statistics
Old Dominion	Passing	Quinn Henicle	11/25, 127 yards
Old Dominion	Rushing	Quinn Henicle	24 carries, 107 yards, 2 TD
Old Dominion	Receiving	Na'eem Abdur-Raheem Gladding	5 receptions, 60 yards
South Florida	Passing	Gaston Moore	20/28, 236 yards, TD, 2 INT
South Florida	Rushing	Alvon Isaac	7 carries, 41 yards
South Florida	Receiving	Christian Neptune	10 receptions, 102 yards
