= Jeremiah Koger =

American football player

No. 4 – Auburn Tigers
- Position: Wide receiver
- Class: Sophomore

Personal information
- Born: Baltimore, Maryland, U.S.
- Listed height: 6 ft 3 in (1.91 m)
- Listed weight: 209 lb (95 kg)

Career information
- High school: Saint Frances Academy (Baltimore, Maryland)
- College: South Florida (2025); Auburn Tigers (2026–present)
- Stats at ESPN

Jeremiah Koger is an American football wide receiver for the Auburn Tigers. He previously played for the South Florida Bulls.

== College career ==
=== South Florida ===
Koger initially committed to the Wake Forest Demon Deacons in April 2024. He later flipped his commitment to South Florida in June. He scored his first career touchdown against the Charlotte 49ers. He entered the transfer portal in January 2026.

=== Auburn ===
Koger committed to the Auburn Tigers on January 5, 2026. The decision came after Auburn hired head coach Alex Golesh from South Florida.

== Personal life ==
Koger was born in Baltimore, Maryland.
