= Bonaire, Georgia =

- Location within Georgia Location within the United States
- Coordinates: 32°32′37″N 83°35′45″W
- Country: United States
- State: Georgia
- County: Houston
- Metropolitan Statistical Area: Warner Robins
- Elevation: 348 ft (106 m)
- Time zone: UTC-5 (Eastern)
  - Summer (DST): UTC-4 (Eastern)
- ZIP code: 31005
- Area code: 478

Bonaire is an unincorporated community in Houston County in the U.S. state of Georgia. It is 6 miles (10 km) south of the center of Warner Robins and is part of the Warner Robins Metropolitan Statistical Area. Bonaire is located on and around U.S. Route 129, which is connected to Interstate 75 by Georgia State Route 96, As of 2021, SR 96 bypass Bonaire. Bonaire is the hometown of former state Governor and 31st United States Secretary of Agriculture Sonny Perdue. Bonaire is also the location of the TV show Critter Fixers. Bonaire is also the location of Warner Robins Air Force Base.

== History ==
The inhabitants of the area formed Bonaire around the newly laid Georgia Southern & Florida railway when it came through in 1888. Newspaper records in 1888 uniformly spell it without the final "e", but in 1889 the modern spelling began to be used (perhaps because the post office was registered with that spelling on Dec 3, 1888). The name is reputedly of French origin, meaning "good air". The Georgia General Assembly incorporated Bonaire in 1912. The town's charter was dissolved in 1995. On April 5, 2022, the town was heavily damaged by a high-end EF3 tornado, which damaged or destroyed multiple homes and knocked down trees, power poles, and power lines. One person was injured.

== Education ==
=== Elementary ===
- Bonaire Elementary School
- Bonaire Primary School
- Hilltop Elementary School

Also served by:

- David A Purdue Elementary School
- David A Purdue Primary School
- Russell Elementary School

=== Middle schools ===
- Bonaire Middle School

Also served by:

- Huntington Middle School

=== High schools ===
Served by:

- Veterans High School
- Warner Robins High School
- Houston County High School
