= Kathleen, Georgia =

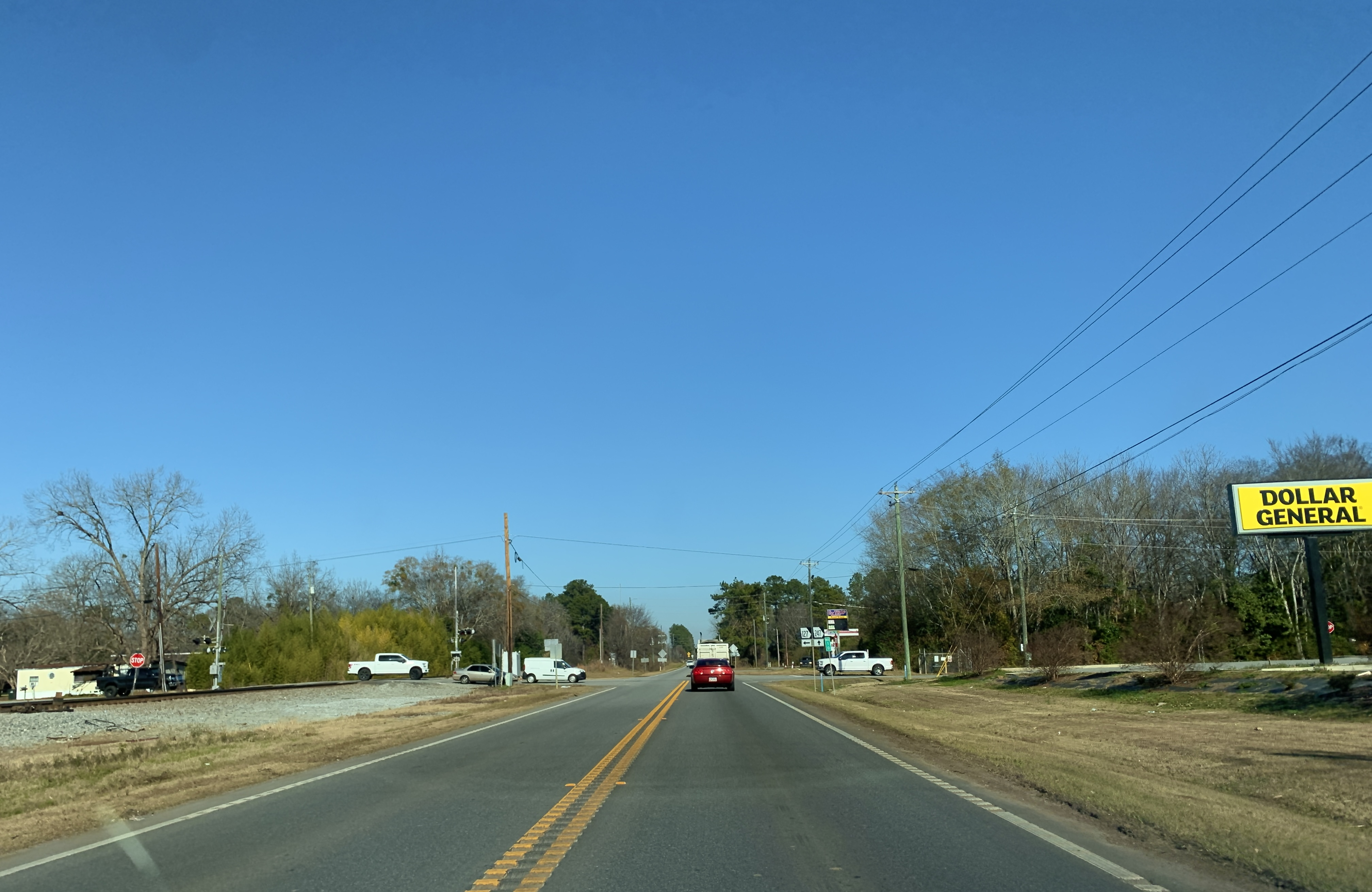

- Location within Georgia Location within the United States
- Coordinates: 32°29′45″N 83°36′27″W
- Country: United States
- State: Georgia
- County: Houston
- Elevation: 330 ft (100 m)
- Time zone: UTC-5 (Eastern)
  - Summer (DST): UTC-4 (Eastern)
- ZIP code: 31047
- Area code: 478

Kathleen is an unincorporated community in Houston County, Georgia, United States. It is part of the Warner Robins, Georgia Metropolitan Statistical Area. It is home to roughly 11,500 people.

== Education ==
Houston County Board of Education (Georgia) operates public schools.

=== Elementary school ===
- Matthew C Arthur Elementary School

Also served by:

- Bonaire Elementary School
- Kings Chapel Elementary School
- Langston Road Elementary School
- David A Purdue Primary/Elementary
- Hilltop Elementary School

=== Middle school ===
- Mossy Creek Middle School
- Veterans Middle School (TBA)

Also served by:

- Bonaire Middle School
- Perry Middle School

=== High school ===
- Veterans High School

Also served by:

- Perry High School
- Houston County High School

== See also ==
- Log Dogtrot House, near Kathleen, a National Register of Historic Places-listed site
