= Veterans High School =

High school located in Kathleen, Georgia, United States

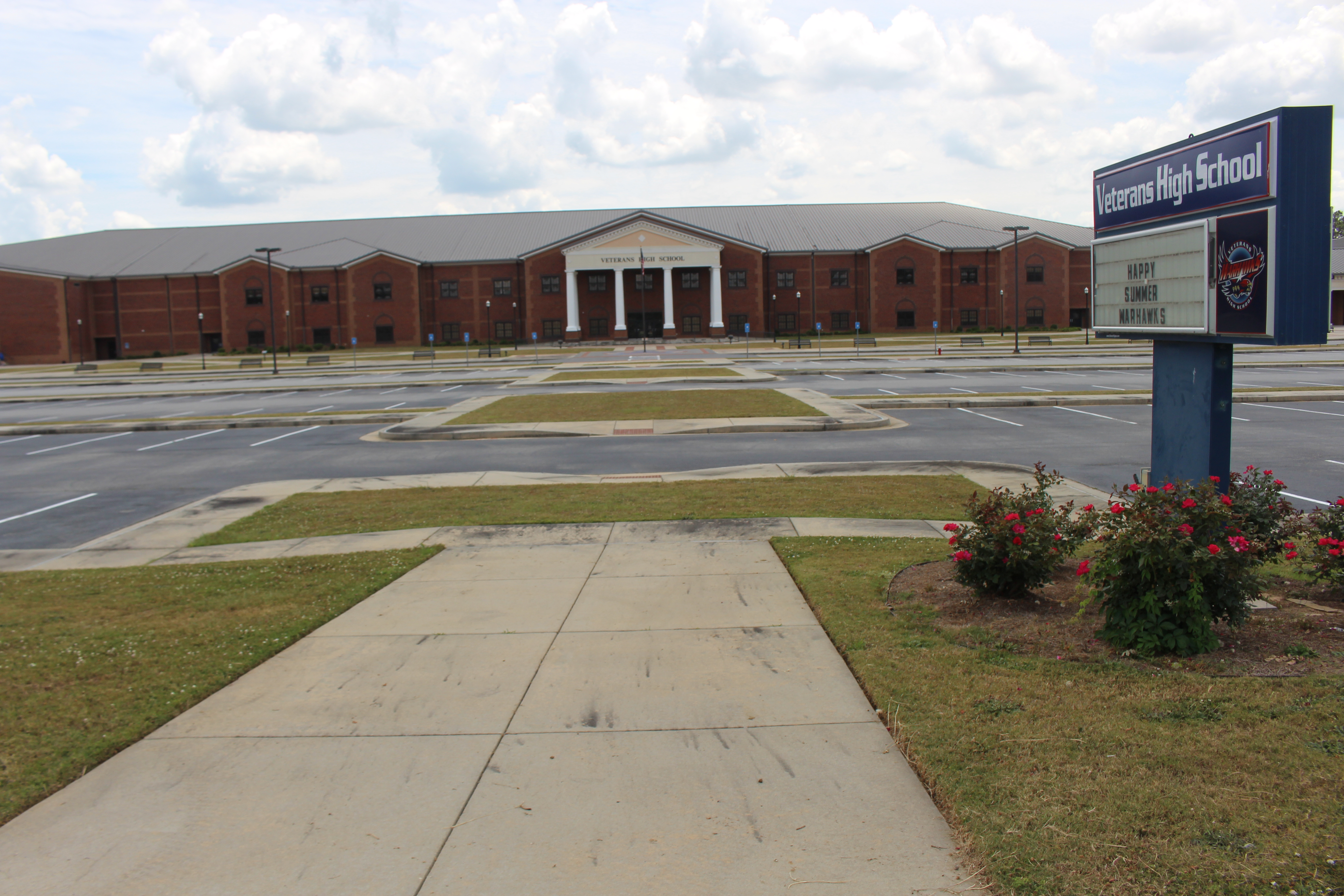

Location
- 340 Piney Grove Road; Kathleen, Georgia 31047; United States; 32.5139°N 83.6128°W

Information
- Motto: "Excellence is the standard, not the goal"
- Established: August 9, 2010; 16 years ago
- School district: Houston County Schools
- Principal: Amy Barbour
- Staff: 99.70 (FTE)
- Grades: 9–12
- Student to teacher ratio: 19.43
- Colors: Red, white and blue
- Athletics: Football, basketball, cheerleading, soccer, track & field, cross country, baseball, golf, swimming, tennis, volleyball, softball, wrestling
- Athletics conference: GHSA Region 1-AAAAAA
- Mascot: Warhawk
- Rivals: Houston Co Bears, Perry Panthers, Warner Robins Demons
- Website: vhs.hcbe.net

Veterans High School is a high school located in Kathleen, which is just south of Warner Robins, Georgia, United States. The school was opened on August 9, 2010, and cost about $61 million to build. It is the fifth (fourth in the Warner Robins area) and largest school opened in the Houston County Schools system.

== Sports ==
=== State Titles ===
- Cheerleading (2) - 2013(4A), 2014(4A)
