= 2025 UAB Blazers football team =

American college football season

2025 UAB Blazers football
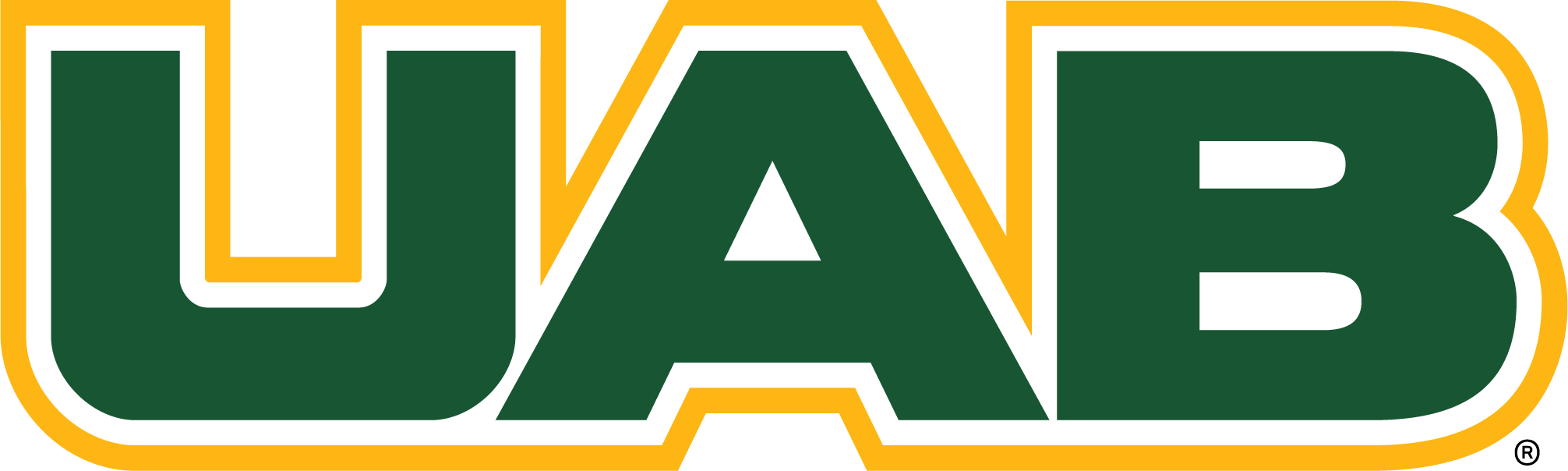
- Conference: American Conference
- Record: 4–8 (2–6 American)
- Head coach: Trent Dilfer (3rd season; first 6 games); Alex Mortensen (interim; remainder of season)
- Offensive coordinator: Alex Mortensen (3rd season)
- Offensive scheme: Multiple
- Defensive coordinator: Steve Russ (1st season)
- Base defense: 3–4
- Home stadium: Protective Stadium

Uniform
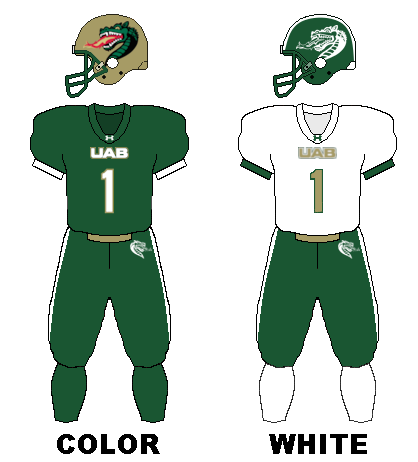

2025 American Conference football standings
	Conf.			Overall
Team	W		L	W		L
No. 18 Tulane y$^	7	–	1	11	–	3
No. 24 North Texas y	7	–	1	12	–	2
No. 23 Navy	7	–	1	11	–	2
South Florida	6	–	2	9	–	4
East Carolina	6	–	2	9	–	4
Memphis	4	–	4	8	–	5
Army	4	–	4	7	–	6
UTSA	4	–	4	7	–	6
Temple	3	–	5	5	–	7
Florida Atlantic	3	–	5	4	–	8
Rice	2	–	6	5	–	8
UAB	2	–	6	4	–	8
Tulsa	1	–	7	4	–	8
Charlotte	0	–	8	1	–	11
Championship: Tulane 34, North Texas 21
^ – College Football Playoff participant; $ – Conference champion; y – Championship game participant; Rankings from AP Poll

The 2025 UAB Blazers football team represented the University of Alabama at Birmingham as a member of the American Conference during the 2025 NCAA Division I FBS football season. The Blazers played their home games at Protective Stadium, located in Birmingham, Alabama.

Third-year head coach Trent Dilfer was fired after he led the Blazers to a 2–4 record to start, with offensive coordinator Alex Mortensen being named interim head coach for the remainder of the season.

== Offseason ==
=== Transfers ===
==== Outgoing ====
Player	Position	Destination
Kam Shanks	WR	Arkansas
Tyderick Brown	CB	FIU
Zaire Flournoy	IOL	FIU
Dallas Payne	TE	FIU
Adrian Maddox	S	Georgia
Kelvin Hill	DB	Georgia Tech
Amare Thomas	WR	Houston
Lee Beebe Jr.	RB	Indiana
Nacari Johnson	CB	Kennesaw State
Trey Bedosky	OL	Liberty
Antavious Woody	OL	Louisiana–Monroe
Daniel Harris	DE	Marshall
Joshua Jackson	WR	McNeese
Everett Roussaw Jr.	LB	Memphis
Chris Bracy	DB	Memphis
Jack Nickel	TE	Miami (FL)
Jordan Hall	OT	North Carolina
Delano Townsend	OL	Ole Miss
Ricky Lee III	S	Sacramento State
Emmanuel Waller	DL	South Alabama
Landry Lyddy	QB	Southern Miss
Miquon Merriweather	DL	Southwest Mississippi CC
Jacob Zeno	QB	Texas A&M
Derrick Shepard Jr.	DL	Tulane
Armoni Goodwin	RB	UT Martin
Brady Wilson	OL	Virginia
Ryan Peppins	WR	West Alabama
Brandon Buckhaulter	WR	Western Kentucky
Tennyson Hadfield	OL	Wingate
Michael Moore	LB	Unknown
Jaqavius Yates	OL	Unknown
Bryce Damous	TE	Unknown
Kyle McKinney	S	Unknown
Deion Gunn	S	Unknown
Dasheen Jackson	S	Unknown
Baron Franks II	OL	Withdrawn
Corri Milliner	WR	Withdrawn
AJ Brown	S	Withdrawn
Sirad Bryant	S	Withdrawn
Brandon Hawkins Jr.	WR	Withdrawn
Demarcus Smith	DL	Withdrawn

==== Incoming ====
Player	Position	Previous team
Dasheen Jackson	S	Alabama State
Nigel Tate	DL	Boston College
Jalen Cheek	S	Boston College
AJ Johnson	WR	East Tennessee State
Antonio Ferguson	TE	FIU
Calvin Pitcher	DB	Idaho State
Kaleb Brown	WR	Iowa
Josh Baka	S	Kent State
Perry Fisher	DB	Maryland
Jamichael Rogers	EDGE	Miles
Eli Ennis	LB	Nicholls
Amorie Morrison	DE	Old Dominion
Tamarion Crumpley	CB	Pittsburgh
Devin Hightower	LB	Rhode Island
JaSire Peterson	DL	Rutgers
Pierre Royster	S	Saint Francis (PA)
Denver Warren	DL	Sam Houston
Jelani Davis	DL	Southern
Jevon Jackson	RB	UTEP
Ryder Burton	QB	West Virginia
Evan McCray	WR	Wingate

== Schedule ==
Date	Time	Opponent	Site	TV	Result	Attendance
August 28	7:30 p.m.	Alabama State*	Protective Stadium; Birmingham, AL	ESPN+	W 52–42	26,294
September 6	2:30 p.m.	at Navy	Navy–Marine Corps Memorial Stadium; Annapolis, MD	CBSSN	L 24–38	28,325
September 13	7:30 p.m.	Akron*	Protective Stadium; Birmingham, AL	ESPN+	W 31–28	17,823
September 20	11:45 a.m.	at No. 15 Tennessee*	Neyland Stadium; Knoxville, TN	SECN	L 24–56	101,915
October 4	11:00 a.m.	Army	Protective Stadium; Birmingham, AL	ESPNU	L 13–31	22,489
October 11	5:00 p.m.	at Florida Atlantic	Flagler Credit Union Stadium; Boca Raton, FL	ESPN+	L 33–53	20,052
October 18	3:00 p.m.	No. 22 Memphis^{†}	Protective Stadium; Birmingham, AL (Battle for the Bones)	ESPN2	W 31–24	19,037
November 1	11:00 a.m.	at UConn*	Pratt & Whitney Stadium at Rentschler Field; East Hartford, CT	CBSSN	L 19–38	23,170
November 8	1:00 p.m.	at Rice	Rice Stadium; Houston, TX	ESPN+	L 17–24	22,671
November 15	1:00 p.m.	North Texas	Protective Stadium; Birmingham, AL	ESPN+	L 24–53	16,190
November 22	2:00 p.m.	South Florida	Protective Stadium; Birmingham, AL	ESPN+	L 18–48	16,376
November 29	2:00 p.m.	at Tulsa	Skelly Field at H. A. Chapman Stadium; Tulsa, OK	ESPN+	W 31–24	13,026
*Non-conference game; ^{†}Homecoming; Rankings from AP Poll and CFP Rankings released prior to game; All times are in Central time

== Personnel ==
=== Roster ===
2025 UAB Blazers football team roster
Players
Coaches
Offense

Pos.	#	Name	Class
WR	0	Iverson Hooks	So
WR	1	Corri Milliner	So
WR	2	A. J. Johnson	Sr
RB	3	Isaiah Jacobs	Sr
RB	4	Jevon Jackson	Sr
WR	5	Kaleb Brown	Jr
WR	6	Brandon Hawkins Jr.	Sr
QB	7	Jalen Kitna	Sr
WR	8	Evan McCray	Sr
QB	9	Trace Campbell	Jr
RB	10	Marquise Collins	So
QB	10	Cam Jennings	Fr
RB	11	Solomon Beebe	So
QB	11	Adrian Posse	Fr
QB	12	Vanden Dugger	Fr
WR	12	Jaylen Elder	Fr
WR	13	CD Gill	Fr
WR	14	Jailen Holmes	Jr
QB	15	Ryder Burton	So
QB	16	Nate Rogers	Fr
TE	17	Elijah Lagg	Jr
WR	18	Xavier Daisy	So
TE	19	Gabriel Cline	Fr
RB	22	Drew Patterson	Fr
RB	30	Amari Brundidge	Fr
TE	40	Brayden Johnson	Fr
TE	44	Joshua Rubin	So
OL	51	Payton Kirkland	So
OL	53	Baron Franks II	Sr
OL	54	Daniel Mincey	Fr
OL	57	Aidan Platt	Fr
OL	58	Ryan Gunter	Jr
OL	59	Jaden Ligon	Fr
OL	66	Donovan Lawrence	Fr
OL	68	Adam Lepkowski	Jr
OL	69	Kade Martin	Fr
OL	70	JonDarius Morgan	Sr
OL	71	Kyrik Mason	Sr
OL	72	Brandon Sneh	Jr
OL	73	Mason Chorak	So
OT	74	Barry Walker	Fr
OL	75	Calib Perez	Jr
OL	77	Logan Moore	So
OL	78	Nelson Ramirez	Jr
OL	79	Rod Orr Jr.	Sr
WR	80	Malik Muhammad	Fr
WR	81	Aron Marsch	Jr
WR	83	Levi Brayton	Fr
WR	84	Lamar White	Fr
TE	85	Antonio Ferguson	So
TE	86	Aaron Mattingly	Fr
TE	87	Connor Harby	Sr
TE	88	J.C. Sivley	So

Defense

Pos.	#	Name	Class
LB	0	Devin Hightower	Sr
S	1	Sirad Bryant	Sr
DE	2	Ezra Odinjor	So
CB	3	Jaylyn Ferguson	So
DE	4	Amorie Morrison	Sr
LB	5	Eddy Toussom	Sr
LB	6	Calvin Pitcher	Sr
S	7	Pierre Royster	Sr
DT	8	Nigel Tate	Sr
DL	9	Denver Warren	Sr
S	10	Jalen Cheek	Sr
CB	11	Perry Fisher	Jr
LB	12	Tylan McNichols	So
CB	13	Tamarion Crumpley	Sr
S	14	Jeremiah Vessel	So
DE	15	Jamichael Rogers	Sr
CB	16	Isaiah Crozier	So
CB	17	Roy Williams	Sr
CB	18	Delvon Gulley	So
DT	19	Demarcus Smith	Sr
S	20	AJ Brown	Jr
S	21	Josh Baka	Sr
S	22	Josiah Crawford	Fr
CB	23	Donald Lee	Sr
CB	24	Tariq Watson	Jr
DE	25	James Smyre	Sr
LB	26	Gage Messick	Jr
LB	28	Brandon Franklin	Jr
CB	29	T'sai McDaniel	Sr
CB	30	Ja'Lyen Judson	Fr
S	33	Kyle McKinney	So
DT	34	Jonathan Allen	So
CB	36	Julius Lane Jr.	Fr
S	37	Love Kirby	Fr
LB	43	Braxtyn Davies	Fr
LB	44	Eli Ennis	Sr
DL	45	Fred Owens	So
LB	48	Phillip Davison Jr.	Fr
LB	49	Jacoby Bridges	Fr
DL	52	Peter Simmons	Sr
DT	54	Kyle Mosley	Fr
DL	55	JaSire Peterson	So
DE	56	Myles Cook	Fr
DE	58	J'Quan Mason	Fr
DE	59	Chris Burge	Fr
DE	90	Zach Johnson	Fr
DE	94	James Steel	Fr
DT	99	Eamon Smalls	So

Special teams

Pos.	#	Name	Class
P	27	Patrick Foley	Sr
K	35	Owen Simpson	Fr
K	39	Jonah Delange	Jr
K	42	Wyatt Martin	Fr
LS	46	Evan Bishop	So
LS	47	Caleb Moser	Jr

Head coach

- Alex Mortensen – Interim Head Coach/Offensive coordinator/quarterbacks

Coordinators/assistant coaches

- Lyle Henley – Assistant head coach/director of sports performance
- Steve Russ – Defensive coordinator
- John Jones – Special teams coordinator/defensive ends
- Danny Mitchell – Running backs/run game coordinator
- Matt McCants – Offensive line
- Kevin Garver – Wide receivers/pass game coordinator
- Reilly Jeffers – Tight ends/recruiting coordinator - offense
- Sam Mills III – Defensive line
- Jonathan Celestin – Linebackers
- Brent Vieselmeyer – Secondary/pass game coordinator
- Ryan Lewis Sr. – Cornerbacks
- Tee Mitchell – Nickels
- Matthew Wright – Assistant linebackers coach
- Luke Godsey – Assistant quarterbacks coach
- Gordon Steele – Assistant offensive line coach
- Jack Henninger – Quality control – offense
- Zach Peterson – Quality control – offense
- Carter Putt – Quality control – offense
- Deshaun Oliver – Quality control – special teams
- Cannon York – Assistant director of sports performance
- Jake Venables – Assistant strength and conditioning coach
- Santonio Jones – Strength and conditioning

Legend

- (C) Team captain
- (S) Suspended
- (I) Ineligible
- Injured
- Redshirt

Roster

== Game summaries ==
=== Alabama State (FCS) ===
Alabama State Hornets (FCS) (0–0) at UAB Blazers (0–0) – Game summary

Quarter	1	2	3	4	Total
Hornets (FCS)	7	14	7	14	42
Blazers	10	7	21	14	52

at Protective Stadium • Birmingham, Alabama

- Date: August 28
- Game time: 7:30 p.m. CDT
- Game weather: Sunny • Temperature: 73 °F (23 °C) • Wind: W at 6 miles per hour (9.7 km/h)
- Game attendance: 26,294
- Referee: Tim Rich
- TV announcers (ESPN+): Doug Sherman (play-by-play) and Dave Steckel (analyst)

Game information

First quarter

- (11:39) UAB – Jonah Delange 42-yard field goal (Drive: 8 plays, 39 yards, 3:15; UAB 3–0)
- (10:57) ALST – Andrew Body 60-yard run, Andrew Abu-Akel kick (Drive: 2 plays, 75 yards, 0:42; Alabama State 7–3)
- (6:23) UAB – Iverson Hooks 8-yard pass from Jalen Kitna, Jonah Delange kick (Drive: 11 plays, 73 yards, 4:29; UAB 10–7)

Second quarter

- (14:56) ALST – Dylan Djete 14-yard pass from Andrew Body, Andrew Abu-Akel kick (Drive: 10 plays, 81 yards, 6:04; Alabama State 14–10)
- (14:02) UAB – Corri Milliner 49-yard pass from Jalen Kitna, Jonah Delange kick (Drive: 3 plays, 81 yards, 0:50; UAB 17–14)
- (0:05) ALST – Ajai Harrell 31-yard pass from Andrew Body, Andrew Abu-Akel kick (Drive: 16 plays, 96 yards, 8:27; Alabama State 21–17)

Third quarter

- (10:10) ALST – Asa Gregg 5-yard pass from Andrew Body, Andrew Abu-Akel kick (Drive: 10 plays, 68 yards, 4:45; Alabama State 28–17)
- (7:45) UAB – Jevon Jackson 3-yard run, run failed (Drive: 6 plays, 66 yards, 2:18; Alabama State 28–23)
- (4:10) UAB – Solomon Beebe 5-yard run, Jevon Jackson run (Drive: 4 plays, 33 yards, 1:52; UAB 31–28)
- (1:42) UAB – Jevon Jackson 46-yard run, Jonah Delange kick (Drive: 2 plays, 56 yards, 0:48; UAB 38–28)

Fourth quarter

- (13:09) ALST – Jamarie Hostzclaw 7-yard run, Andrew Abu-Akel kick (Drive: 6 plays, 68 yards, 3:27; UAB 38–35)
- (8:21) UAB – Isaiah Jacobs 5-yard run, Jonah Delange kick (Drive: 10 plays, 60 yards, 4:39; UAB 45–35)
- (4:18) ALST – Jalen Jones 69-yard pass from Andrew Body, Andrew Abu-Akel kick (Drive: 7 plays, 75 yards, 4:03; UAB 45–42)
- (1:19) UAB – Solomon Beebe 7-yard run, Jonah Delange kick (Drive: 7 plays, 67 yards, 2:57; UAB 52–42)

Statistics	ALST	UAB
First downs	26	24
Plays–yards	65–514	58–520
Rushes–yards	41–202	35–273
Passing yards	312	247
Passing: comp–att–int	18–24–0	18–23–0
Turnovers	1	0
Time of possession	34:14	25:46

Team	Category	Player	Statistics
Alabama State	Passing	Andrew Body	18/24, 312 yards, 4 TD
Alabama State	Rushing	Andrew Body	16 carries, 119 yards, TD
Alabama State	Receiving	Jalen Jones	6 receptions, 174 yards, TD
UAB	Passing	Jalen Kitna	18/23, 247 yards, 2 TD
UAB	Rushing	Jevon Jackson	17 carries, 166 yards, 2 TD
UAB	Receiving	Corri Milliner	5 receptions, 98 yards, TD

=== at Navy ===
UAB Blazers (1–0) at Navy Midshipmen (1–0) – Game summary

Quarter	1	2	3	4	Total
Blazers	7	17	0	0	24
Midshipmen	14	10	7	7	38

at Navy–Marine Corps Memorial Stadium • Annapolis, Maryland

- Date: September 6
- Game time: 2:30 p.m. CDT
- Game weather: Sunny • Temperature: 84 °F (29 °C) • Wind: SE at 15 miles per hour (24 km/h)
- Game attendance: 28,325
- Referee: Steven Anderson
- TV announcers (CBSSN): Chris Lewis (play-by-play), Randy Cross (analyst) and Brandon Baylor (sideline)

Game information

First quarter

- (12:36) NAVY – Blake Horvath 1-yard run, Nathan Kirkwood kick (Drive: 5 plays, 75 yards, 2:24; Navy 7–0)
- (9:41) UAB – Iverson Hooks 51-yard pass from Jalen Kitna, Jonah Delange kick (Drive: 6 plays, 75 yards, 2:55; Tied 7–7)
- (3:06) NAVY – Eli Heidenreich 9-yard run, Nathan Kirkwood kick (Drive: 14 plays, 75 yards, 6:35; Navy 14–7)

Second quarter

- (14:14) UAB – Corri Milliner 25-yard pass from Jalen Kitna, Jonah Delange kick (Drive: 8 plays, 65 yards, 3:52; Tied 14–14)
- (12:16) NAVY – Luke Hutchison 63-yard pass from Blake Horvath, Nathan Kirkwood kick (Drive: 4 plays, 74 yards, 1:51; Navy 21–14)
- (11:19) UAB – Jevon Jackson 12-yard run, Jonah Delange kick (Drive: 3 plays, 75 yards, 0:57; Tied 21–21)
- (4:54) NAVY – Nathan Kirkwood 27-yard field goal (Drive: 10 plays, 65 yards, 6:25; Navy 24–21)
- (0:00) UAB – Jonah Delange 40-yard field goal (Drive: 11 plays, 70 yards, 4:44; Tied 24–24)

Third quarter

- (4:12) NAVY – Blake Horvath 4-yard run, Nathan Kirkwood kick (Drive: 6 plays, 29 yards, 2:23; Navy 31–24)

Fourth quarter

- (14:57) NAVY – Alex Tecza 1-yard run, Nathan Kirkwood kick (Drive: 5 plays, 82 yards, 2:55; Navy 38–24)

Statistics	UAB	NAVY
First downs	23	20
Plays–yards	60–413	59–463
Rushes–yards	27–92	51–295
Passing yards	321	168
Passing: comp–att–int	23–33–2	6–8–0
Turnovers	3	0
Time of possession	27:38	32:22

Team	Category	Player	Statistics
UAB	Passing	Jalen Kitna	22/32, 304 yards, 2 TD, 2 INT
UAB	Rushing	Jevon Jackson	15 carries, 66 yards, TD
UAB	Receiving	Corri Milliner	6 receptions, 100 yards, TD
Navy	Passing	Blake Horvath	6/8, 168 yards, TD
Navy	Rushing	Alex Tecza	15 carries, 111 yards, TD
Navy	Receiving	Cody Howard	1 reception, 65 yards

=== Akron ===
Akron Zips (0–2) at UAB Blazers (1–1) – Game summary

Quarter	1	2	3	4	Total
Zips	17	3	0	8	28
Blazers	14	17	0	0	31

at Protective Stadium • Birmingham, Alabama

- Date: September 13
- Game time: 7:30 p.m. CDT
- Game weather: Sunny • Temperature: 81 °F (27 °C) • Wind: E at 4 miles per hour (6.4 km/h)
- Game attendance: 17,823
- Referee: Marcel Kerr
- TV announcers (ESPN+): Kevin Fitzgerald (play-by-play) and Tyoka Jackson (analyst)

Game information

First quarter

- (14:49) UAB – Solomon Beebe 96-yard kickoff return, Jonah Delange kick (UAB 7–0)
- (14:38) AKR – Israel Polk 75-yard pass from Ben Finley, Owen Wiley kick (Drive: 1 play, 75 yards, 0:11; Tied 7–7)
- (8:36) AKR – Israel Polk 5-yard pass from Ben Finley, Owen Wiley kick (Drive: 9 plays, 55 yards, 2:55; Akron 14–7)
- (4:21) UAB – Nate Rogers 8-yard run, Jonah Delange kick (Drive: 9 plays, 65 yards, 2:08; Tied 14–14)
- (1:26) AKR – Owen Wiley 36-yard field goal (Drive: 10 plays, 56 yards, 2:55; Akron 17–14)

Second quarter

- (14:24) UAB – Jonah Delange 44-yard field goal (Drive: 9 plays, 39 yards, 2:02; Tied 17–17)
- (8:48) UAB – Jevon Jackson 6-yard pass from Jalen Kitna, Jonah Delange kick (Drive: 7 plays, 96 yards, 3:02; UAB 24–17)
- (1:53) AKR – Owen Wiley 23-yard field goal (Drive: 6 plays, 25 yards, 2:06; UAB 24–20)
- (0:47) UAB – Corri Milliner 5-yard pass from Jalen Kitna, Jonah Delange kick (Drive: 8 plays, 62 yards, 1:00; UAB 31–20)

Third quarter

- No scoring plays

Fourth quarter

- (12:38) AKR – Sean Patrick 1-yard run, Ben Finley run (Drive: 12 plays, 83 yards, 5:01; UAB 31–28)

Statistics	AKR	UAB
First downs	21	26
Plays–yards	78–441	76–421
Rushes–yards	43–159	32–80
Passing yards	282	341
Passing: comp–att–int	19–35–0	30–44–0
Turnovers	0	1
Time of possession	29:58	30:02

Team	Category	Player	Statistics
Akron	Passing	Ben Finley	19/35, 282 yards, 2 TD
Akron	Rushing	Sean Patrick	19 carries, 81 yards, TD
Akron	Receiving	Israel Polk	4 receptions, 99 yards, 2 TD
UAB	Passing	Jalen Kitna	30/44, 341 yards, 2 TD
UAB	Rushing	Jevon Jackson	14 carries, 45 yards
UAB	Receiving	Iverson Hooks	5 receptions, 84 yards

=== at No. 15 Tennessee ===
UAB Blazers (2–1) at No. 15 Tennessee Volunteers (2–1) – Game summary

Quarter	1	2	3	4	Total
Blazers	0	7	10	7	24
No. 15 Volunteers	21	21	14	0	56

at Neyland Stadium • Knoxville, Tennessee

- Date: September 20
- Game time: 11:45 a.m. CDT
- Game weather: Sunny • Temperature: 80 °F (27 °C) • Wind: W at 2 miles per hour (3.2 km/h)
- Game attendance: 101,915
- Referee: Daniel Gautreaux
- TV announcers (SECN): Taylor Zarzour (play-by-play), Matt Stinchcomb (analyst) and Alyssa Lang (sideline)

Game information

First quarter

- (12:56) TENN – Chris Brazzell II 19-yard pass from Joey Aguilar, Max Gilbert kick (Drive: 7 plays, 75 yards, 2:04; Tennessee 7–0)
- (11:05) TENN – Mike Matthews 39-yard pass from Joey Aguilar, Max Gilbert kick (Drive: 2 plays, 50 yards, 0:25; Tennessee 14–0)
- (4:01) TENN – DeSean Bishop 3-yard run, Max Gilbert kick (Drive: 5 plays, 45 yards, 1:26; Tennessee 21–0)

Second quarter

- (10:44) TENN – Star Thomas 1-yard run, Max Gilbert kick (Drive: 10 plays, 60 yards, 3:25; Tennessee 28–0)
- (7:34) UAB – Brandon Hawkins Jr. 30-yard pass from Jalen Kitna, Jonah Delange kick (Drive: 10 plays, 75 yards, 3:10; Tennessee 28–7)
- (2:50) TENN – Peyton Lewis 32-yard run, Max Gilbert kick (Drive: 12 plays, 75 yards, 4:44; Tennessee 35–7)
- (0:32) TENN – DeSean Bishop 2-yard run, Max Gilbert kick (Drive: 4 plays, 33 yards, 1:14; Tennessee 42–7)

Third quarter

- (12:06) UAB – Jonah Delange 45-yard field goal (Drive: 4 plays, 4 yards, 1:17; Tennessee 42–10)
- (9:53) TENN – Star Thomas 17-yard pass from Joey Aguilar, Max Gilbert kick (Drive: 5 plays, 54 yards, 2:03; Tennessee 49–10)
- (2:37) TENN – Kaleb Beasley 23-yard fumble recovery, Max Gilbert kick (Tennessee 56–10)
- (1:24) UAB – Kaleb Brown 61-yard pass from Jalen Kitna, Jonah Delange kick (Drive: 3 plays, 75 yards, 1:13; Tennessee 56–17)

Fourth quarter

- (0:48) UAB – Isaiah Jacobs 1-yard run, Jonah Delange kick (Drive: 14 plays, 82 yards, 6:48; Tennessee 56–24)

Statistics	UAB	TENN
First downs	18	28
Plays–yards	71–394	73–510
Rushes–yards	19–23	43–235
Passing yards	371	275
Passing: comp–att–int	39–52–1	18–30–1
Turnovers	2	2
Time of possession	33:52	26:08

Team	Category	Player	Statistics
UAB	Passing	Jalen Kitna	38/51, 364 yards, 2 TD, INT
UAB	Rushing	Isaiah Jacobs	6 carries, 19 yards, TD
UAB	Receiving	Kaleb Brown	4 receptions, 79 yards, TD
Tennessee	Passing	Joey Aguilar	15/22, 218 yards, 3 TD, INT
Tennessee	Rushing	Peyton Lewis	11 carries, 81 yards, TD
Tennessee	Receiving	Chris Brazzell II	5 receptions, 62 yards, TD

=== Army ===
Army Black Knights (1–3) at UAB Blazers (2–2) – Game summary

Quarter	1	2	3	4	Total
Black Knights	0	10	7	14	31
Blazers	0	7	0	6	13

at Protective Stadium • Birmingham, Alabama

- Date: October 4
- Game time: 11:00 a.m. CDT
- Game weather: Sunny • Temperature: 73 °F (23 °C) • Wind: W at 8 miles per hour (13 km/h)
- Game attendance: 22,489
- Referee: Reid Jackson
- TV announcers (ESPNU): Matt Schumacker (play-by-play) and Dustin Fox (analyst)

Game information

First quarter

- No scoring plays

Second quarter

- (13:47) ARMY – Hayden Reed 3-yard run, Dawson Jones kick (Drive: 18 plays, 74 yards, 10:34; Army 7–0)
- (1:16) UAB – Xavier Daisy 1-yard pass from Jalen Kitna, Jonah Delange kick (Drive: 8 plays, 90 yards, 1:52; Tied 7–7)
- (0:02) ARMY – Dawson Jones 45-yard field goal (Drive: 8 plays, 40 yards, 1:08; Army 10–7)

Third quarter

- (5:11) ARMY – Cale Hellums 5-yard run, Dawson Jones kick (Drive: 9 plays, 80 yards, 4:56; Army 17–7)

Fourth quarter

- (14:18) ARMY – Cale Hellums 1-yard run, Dawson Jones kick (Drive: 5 plays, 12 yards, 2:36; Army 24–7)
- (4:10) ARMY – Cale Hellums 5-yard run, Dawson Jones kick (Drive: 4 plays, 20 yards, 1:35; Army 31–7)
- (0:54) UAB – Ryder Burton 1-yard run, pass failed (Drive: 12 plays, 79 yards, 3:11; Army 31–13)

Statistics	ARMY	UAB
First downs	17	16
Plays–yards	66–295	60–362
Rushes–yards	61–247	18–103
Passing yards	48	259
Passing: comp–att–int	2–5–0	24–42–1
Turnovers	0	2
Time of possession	36:41	23:19

Team	Category	Player	Statistics
Army	Passing	Cale Hellums	1/3, 41 yards
Army	Rushing	Cale Hellums	21 carries, 81 yards, 3 TD
Army	Receiving	Samari Howard	2 receptions, 48 yards
UAB	Passing	Jalen Kitna	24/42, 259 yards, TD, INT
UAB	Rushing	Jevon Jackson	12 carries, 89 yards
UAB	Receiving	Iverson Hooks	4 receptions, 71 yards

=== at Florida Atlantic ===
UAB Blazers (2–3) at Florida Atlantic Owls (2–3) – Game summary

Quarter	1	2	3	4	Total
Blazers	0	14	16	3	33
Owls	21	14	15	3	53

at Flagler Credit Union Stadium • Boca Raton, Florida

- Date: October 11
- Game time: 5:00 p.m. CDT
- Game weather: Cloudy • Temperature: 80 °F (27 °C) • Wind: SE at 2 miles per hour (3.2 km/h)
- Referee: Charles Lamertina
- TV announcers (ESPN+): James Westling (play-by-play), Leger Douzable (analyst) and Smacker Miles (sideline)

Game information

First quarter

- (10:07) FAU – Kaden Shields-Dutton 13-yard run, Garrison Smith kick (Drive: 7 plays, 64 yards, 3:12; Florida Atlantic 7–0)
- (5:17) FAU – Kaden Shields-Dutton 2-yard run, Garrison Smith kick (Drive: 8 plays, 45 yards, 2:46; Florida Atlantic 14–0)
- (0:27) FAU – Jayshon Platt 48-yard pass from Easton Messer, Garrison Smith kick (Drive: 3 plays, 81 yards, 0:34; Florida Atlantic 21–0)

Second quarter

- (13:04) FAU – Jabari Smith 37-yard pass from Caden Veltkamp, Garrison Smith kick (Drive: 2 plays, 40 yards, 0:41; Florida Atlantic 28–0)
- (5:47) UAB – Solomon Beebe 14-yard run, run failed (Drive: 14 plays, 77 yards, 7:11; Florida Atlantic 28–6)
- (3:15) UAB – Solomon Beebe 13-yard run, Iverson Hooks pass (Drive: 4 plays, 21 yards, 2:19; Florida Atlantic 28–14)
- (1:29) FAU – Dominique Henry 43-yard pass from Caden Veltkamp, Garrison Smith kick (Drive: 7 plays, 75 yards, 1:46; Florida Atlantic 35–14)

Third quarter

- (11:40) FAU – Kaden Shields-Dutton 1-yard run, Garrison Smith kick (Drive: 7 plays, 50 yards, 3:12; Florida Atlantic 42–14)
- (7:31) UAB – Nate Rogers 11-yard run, Ryder Burton run (Drive: 9 plays, 75 yards, 4:09; Florida Atlantic 42–22)
- (4:44) FAU – Asaad Waseem 29-yard pass from Caden Veltkamp, Asaad Waseem pass (Drive: 7 plays, 80 yards, 2:43; Florida Atlantic 50–22)
- (1:53) UAB – Isaiah Jacobs 3-yard pass from Jalen Kitna, Solomon Beebe run (Drive: 6 plays, 75 yards, 2:51; Florida Atlantic 50–30)

Fourth quarter

- (5:05) UAB – Jonah Delange 45-yard field goal (Drive: 12 plays, 36 yards, 6:50; Florida Atlantic 50–33)
- (1:57) FAU – Garrison Smith 28-yard field goal (Drive: 8 plays, 29 yards, 3:08; Florida Atlantic 53–33)

Statistics	UAB	FAU
First downs	19	24
Plays–yards	69–329	62–494
Rushes–yards	28–68	31–149
Passing yards	261	345
Passing: comp–att–int	29–41–0	21–31–1
Turnovers	0	1
Time of possession	35:13	24:47

Team	Category	Player	Statistics
UAB	Passing	Jalen Kitna	29/41, 261 yards, TD
UAB	Rushing	Solomon Beebe	4 carries, 34 yards, 2 TD
UAB	Receiving	Solomon Beebe	6 receptions, 63 yards
Florida Atlantic	Passing	Caden Veltkamp	20/30, 297 yards, 3 TD, INT
Florida Atlantic	Rushing	Kaden Shields-Dutton	15 carries, 77 yards, 3 TD
Florida Atlantic	Receiving	Asaad Waseem	7 receptions, 105 yards, TD

=== No. 22 Memphis (Battle for the Bones) ===
No. 22 Memphis Tigers (6–0) at UAB Blazers (2–4) – Game summary

Quarter	1	2	3	4	Total
No. 22 Tigers	7	7	3	7	24
Blazers	7	10	7	7	31

at Protective Stadium • Birmingham, Alabama

- Date: October 18
- Game time: 3:00 p.m. CDT
- Game weather: Sunny
- Game attendance: 19,037
- Referee: Edwin Lee
- TV announcers (ESPN2): Matt Schumacker (play-by-play), Dustin Fox (analyst), and Tori Petry (sideline)

Game information

First quarter

- (9:56) UAB – Iverson Hooks 15-yard pass from Ryder Burton, Jonah Delange kick (Drive: 10 plays, 75 yards, 5:04; UAB 7–0)
- (9:42) MEM – Sutton Smith 99-yard kickoff return, Gianni Spetic kick (Tied 7–7)

Second quarter

- (7:08) UAB – Jonah Delange 21-yard field goal (Drive: 15 plays, 57 yards, 8:35; UAB 10–7)
- (1:12) MEM – Greg Desrosiers Jr. 1-yard run, Gianni Spetic kick (Drive: 12 plays, 75 yards, 5:56; Memphis 14–10)
- (0:02) UAB – Iverson Hooks 16-yard pass from Ryder Burton, Jonah Delange kick (Drive: 7 plays, 75 yards, 1:10; UAB 17–14)

Third quarter

- (10:33) UAB – Solomon Beebe 81-yard run, Jonah Delange kick (Drive: 2 plays, 79 yards, 0:50; UAB 24–14)
- (3:14) MEM – Gianni Spetic 25-yard field goal (Drive: 14 plays, 68 yards, 7:19; UAB 24–17)

Fourth quarter

- (4:06) UAB – Iverson Hooks 20-yard pass from Ryder Burton, Jonah Delange kick (Drive: 11 plays, 99 yards, 6:40; UAB 31–17)
- (2:19) MEM – Christian Ross 37-yard pass from AJ Hill, Gianni Spetic kick (Drive: 8 plays, 68 yards, 1:45; UAB 31–24)

Statistics	MEM	UAB
First downs	20	25
Plays–yards	60–362	68–470
Rushes–yards	25–119	41–219
Passing yards	243	251
Passing: comp–att–int	22–35–1	20–27–1
Turnovers	1	2
Time of possession	24:55	35:05

Team	Category	Player	Statistics
Memphis	Passing	AJ Hill	13/25, 175 yards, TD, INT
Memphis	Rushing	Greg Desrosiers Jr.	11 carries, 74 yards, TD
Memphis	Receiving	Cortez Braham Jr.	5 receptions, 83 yards
UAB	Passing	Ryder Burton	20/27, 251 yards, 3 TD, INT
UAB	Rushing	Solomon Beebe	5 carries, 106 yards, TD
UAB	Receiving	Iverson Hooks	11 receptions, 172 yards, 3 TD

=== at UConn ===
UAB Blazers (3–4) at UConn Huskies (5–3) – Game summary

Quarter	1	2	3	4	Total
Blazers	0	0	6	13	19
Huskies	7	17	14	0	38

at Pratt & Whitney Stadium at Rentschler Field • East Hartford, Connecticut

- Date: November 1
- Game time: 12:00 PM EDT
- Game weather: Sunny • Temperature: 54 °F (12 °C) • Wind: NW at 11 miles per hour (18 km/h)
- Game attendance: 23,170
- Referee: Steven Anderson
- TV announcers (CBSSN): Fran Charles (play-by-play), Taylor McHargue (analyst) & Hailey Sutton (sideline)

Game information

First quarter

- CONN - Skyler Bell 26-yard pass from Joe Fagnano (Chris Freeman kick), 1:04. Huskies 7–0. Drive: 9 plays, 83 yards, 04:09.

Second quarter

- CONN - Cam Edwards 1-yard run (Chris Freeman kick), 10:45. Huskies 14–0. Drive: 10 plays, 67 yards, 03:57.
- CONN - Chris Freeman 50-yard field goal, 8:44. Huskies 17–0. Drive: 4 plays, 5 yards, 01:56.
- CONN - Skyler Bell 9-yard pass from Joe Fagnano (Chris Freeman kick), 3:56. Huskies 24–0. Drive: 3 plays, 14 yards, 01:33.

Third quarter

- CONN - Juice Vereen 6-yard pass from Joe Fagnano (Chris Freeman kick), 8:02. Huskies 31–0. Drive: 7 plays, 45 yards, 03:13.
- UAB - Brandon Hawkins Jr. 68-yard pass from Ryder Burton (pass failed), 7:18. Huskies 31–6. Drive: 2 plays, 75 yards, 00:44.
- CONN - Skyler Bell 39-yard pass from Joe Fagnano (Chris Freeman kick), 5:18. Huskies 38–6. Drive: 6 plays, 72 yards, 02:00.

Fourth quarter

- UAB - Brandon Hawkins Jr. 32-yard run (pass failed), 12:09. Huskies 38–12. Drive: 4 plays, 59 yards, 01:28.
- UAB - Kaleb Brown 13-yard pass from Ryder Burton (Jonah Delange kick), 0:07. Huskies 38–19. Drive: 15 plays, 82 yards, 06:55.

Statistics	UAB	CONN
First downs	23	20
Plays–yards	70–372	61–374
Rushes–yards	34–154	31–107
Passing yards	218	267
Passing: Comp–Att–Int	24–36–3	23–30–0
Turnovers	3	0
Time of possession	31:09	28:51

Team	Category	Player	Statistics
UAB	Passing	Ryder Burton	21/30, 209 yards, 2 TD
UAB	Rushing	Jevon Jckson	9 carries, 61 yards
UAB	Receiving	Brandon Hawkins Jr.	4 receptions, 89 yards, TD
UConn	Passing	Joe Fagnano	23/30, 267 yards, 4 TD
UConn	Rushing	Cam Edwards	15 carries, 62 yards, TD
UConn	Receiving	Skyler Bell	8 receptions, 149 yards, 3 TD

=== at Rice ===
UAB Blazers (3–5) at Rice Owls (4–5) – Game summary

Quarter	1	2	3	4	Total
Blazers	7	10	0	0	17
Owls	7	7	10	0	24

at Rice Stadium • Houston, Texas

- Date: November 8
- Game time: 1:00 p.m. CDT
- Game weather: Sunny • Temperature: 82 °F (28 °C) • Wind: SW at 9 miles per hour (14 km/h)
- Game attendance: 22,671
- Referee: Reid Jackson
- TV announcers (ESPN+): Shawn Kenney (play-by-play), Forrest Conoly (analyst) and Smacker Miles (sideline)

Game information

First quarter

- (11:08) UAB – Iverson Hooks 26-yard pass from Ryder Burton, Jonah Delange kick (Drive: 2 plays, 34 yards, 0:45; UAB 7–0)
- (6:23) RICE – Tyson Thompson 23-yard pass from Chase Jenkins, Enock Gota kick (Drive: 10 plays, 62 yards, 4:38; Tied 7–7)

Second quarter

- (6:23) RICE – D'Andre Hardeman Jr. 1-yard run, Enock Gota kick (Drive: 19 plays, 48 yards, 9:01; Rice 14–7)
- (2:35) UAB – Jonah Delange 20-yard field goal (Drive: 14 plays, 64 yards, 8:06; Rice 14–10)
- (0:03) UAB – Brandon Hawkins Jr. 21-yard pass from Ryder Burton, Jonah Delange kick (Drive: 7 plays, 56 yards, 0:55; UAB 17–14)

Third quarter

- (9:29) RICE – Aaron Turner 3-yard pass from Chase Jenkins, Enock Gota kick (Drive: 11 plays, 75 yards, 5:31; Rice 21–17)
- (1:00) RICE – Enock Gota 38-yard field goal (Drive: 10 plays, 43 yards, 5:02; Rice 24–17)

Fourth quarter

- No scoring plays

Statistics	UAB	RICE
First downs	18	18
Plays–yards	63–315	72–232
Rushes–yards	29–102	57–191
Passing yards	213	41
Passing: comp–att–int	18–34–0	11–15–0
Turnovers	0	1
Time of possession	25:09	34:51

Team	Category	Player	Statistics
UAB	Passing	Ryder Burton	18/34, 213 yards, 2 TD
UAB	Rushing	Jevon Jackson	15 carries, 89 yards
UAB	Receiving	Iverson Hooks	6 receptions, 89 yards, TD
Rice	Passing	Chase Jenkins	11/15, 41 yards, 2 TD
Rice	Rushing	Quinton Jackson	22 carries, 81 yards
Rice	Receiving	Tyson Thompson	3 receptions, 33 yards, TD

=== North Texas ===
North Texas Mean Green (8–1) at UAB Blazers (3–6) – Game summary

Quarter	1	2	3	4	Total
Mean Green	21	10	15	7	53
Blazers	0	7	11	6	24

at Protective Stadium • Birmingham, Alabama

- Date: November 15
- Game time: 1:00 p.m. CDT
- Game weather: Sunny • Temperature: 77 °F (25 °C) • Wind: SW at 12 miles per hour (19 km/h)
- Game attendance: 16,190
- Referee: Charles Lamertina
- TV announcers (ESPN+): Shawn Kenney (play-by-play), Tyoka Jackson (analyst) and Savanna Collins (sideline)

Game information

First quarter

- (8:48) UNT – Caleb Hawkins 1-yard run, Kali Nguma kick (Drive: 14 plays, 75 yards, 6:12; North Texas 7–0)
- (4:15) UNT – Caleb Hawkins 4-yard run, Kali Nguma kick (Drive: 6 plays, 56 yards, 2:38; North Texas 14–0)
- (3:11) UNT - Caleb Hawkins 11-yard run, Kali Nguma kick (Drive: 4 plays, 22 yards, 0:29; North Texas 21-0)

Second quarter

- (11:07) UNT – Caleb Hawkins 9-yard run, Kali Nguma kick (Drive: 2 plays, 70 yards, 0:34; North Texas 28–0)
- (5:34) UAB – Brandon Hawkins Jr. 32-yard pass from Jalen Kitna, Jonah Delange kick (Drive: 10 plays, 75 yards, 5:33; North Texas 28-7)
- (3:23) UNT – Kali Nguma 46-yard field goal (Drive: 6 plays, 14 yards, 1:59; North Texas 31–7)

Third quarter

- (11:55) UAB - Ryder Burton 1-yard run, Jalen Kitna pass to Brandon Hawkins Jr. for two-point conversion (Drive: 6 plays, 75 yards, 3:05; North Texas 31-15)
- (9:37) UNT - Wyatt Young 7-yard pass from Drew Mestemaker, Kali Nguma kick (Drive: 5 plays, 49 yards, 2:08; North Texas 38-15)
- (6:37) UAB - Jonah Delange 46-yard field goal (Drive: 8 plays, 47 yards, 3:00; North Texas 38-18)
- (3:26) UNT - Caleb Hawkins 5-yard run, Drew Mestemaker pass to Wyatt Young for two-point conversion (Drive: 8 plays, 75 yards, 3:11; North Texas 46-18)

Fourth quarter

- (12:00) UAB - Isaiah Jacobs 6-yard run, two-point pass conversion failed (Drive: 15 plays, 75 yards, 6:26; North Texas 46-24)
- (3:00) UNT - Cameron Dorner 30-yard pass from Drew Mestemaker, Kali Nguma kick (Drive: 8 plays, 99 yards, 5:23; North Texas 53-24)

Statistics	UNT	UAB
First downs	22	26
Plays–yards	60–506	85–478
Rushes–yards	34–208	35–190
Passing yards	298	288
Passing: comp–att–int	18–25–0	26–45–2
Turnovers	0	4
Time of possession	24:51	35:09

Team	Category	Player	Statistics
North Texas	Passing	Drew Mestemaker	18/25, 298 yards, 2 TD
North Texas	Rushing	Caleb Hawkins	27 carries, 189 yards, 5 TD
North Texas	Receiving	Wyatt Young	8 receptions, 143 yards, TD
UAB	Passing	Jalen Kitna	26/45, 281 yards, TD, 2 INT
UAB	Rushing	Jevon Jackson	16 carries, 159 yards
UAB	Receiving	Brandon Hawkins Jr.	6 receptions, 127 yards, TD

=== South Florida ===
South Florida Bulls (7-3) at UAB Blazers (3-7) – Game summary

Quarter	1	2	3	4	Total
Bulls	7	10	17	14	48
Blazers	10	0	0	8	18

at Protective Stadium • Birmingham, Alabama

- Date: November 22
- Game time: 2:00 p.m. CST
- Game attendance: 16,376
- Referee: Edwin Lee
- TV announcers (ESPN+): Pete Sousa (play-by-play) and Forrest Conoly (analyst)

Game information

First quarter

- USF – Byrum Brown 1-yard run (Nico Gramatica kick), 11:47. Bulls 7–0. Drive: 3 plays, 36 yards, 0:55.
- UAB – Jonah Delange 30-yard field goal, 8:30. Bulls 7–3. Drive: 7 plays, 12 yards, 3:06.
- UAB – Isaiah Jacobs 6-yard run (Jonah Delange kick), 1:16. Blazers 10–7. Drive: 7 plays, 85 yards, 4:14.

Second quarter

- USF – Wyatt Sullivan 6-yard pass from Byrum Brown (Nico Gramatica kick), 4:32. Bulls 14–10. Drive: 10 plays, 96 yards, 4:18.
- USF – Nico Gramatica 49-yard field goal, 1:13. Bulls 17–10. Drive: 9 plays, 32 yards, 1:52.

Third quarter

- USF – Mudia Reuben 60-yard pass from Byrum Brown (Nico Gramatica kick), 14:38. Bulls 24–10. Drive: 1 play, 60 yards, 0:15.
- USF – Nico Gramatica 43-yard field goal, 7:59. Bulls 27–10. Drive: 5 plays, 55 yards, 2:37.
- USF – Nykahi Davenport 2-yard run (Nico Gramatica kick), 4:04. Bulls 34–10. Drive: 4 plays, 45 yards, 0:51.

Fourth quarter

- UAB – Solomon Beebe 3-yard run (Ryder Burton run), 14:04. Bulls 34–18. Drive: 8 plays, 75 yards, 3:42.
- USF – Mudia Reuben 59-yard pass from Byrum Brown (Nico Gramatica kick), 12:09. Bulls 41–18. Drive: 5 plays, 75 yards, 1:55.
- USF – Byrum Brown 2-yard run (Nico Gramatica kick), 1:42. Bulls 48–18. Drive: 11 plays, 99 yards, 4:16.

Statistics	USF	UAB
First downs	24	27
Plays–yards	59–544	83–382
Rushes–yards	34–191	43–131
Passing yards	353	251
Passing: comp–att–int	19–25–0	21–40–3
Turnovers	1	3
Time of possession	21:52	38:08

Team	Category	Player	Statistics
South Florida	Passing	Byrum Brown	19/25, 353 yards, 3 TD
South Florida	Rushing	Nykahi Davenport	17 carries, 121 yards, TD
South Florida	Receiving	Mudia Reuben	5 receptions, 174 yards, 2 TD
UAB	Passing	Jalen Kitna	20/36, 230 yards, 3 INT
UAB	Rushing	Isaiah Jacobs	6 carries, 38 yards, TD
UAB	Receiving	Iverson Hooks	10 receptions, 146 yards

=== at Tulsa ===
UAB Blazers (3-8) at Tulsa Golden Hurricane (4-7) – Game summary

Quarter	1	2	3	4	Total
Blazers	7	3	7	14	31
Golden Hurricane	3	14	0	7	24

at Skelly Field • Tulsa, Oklahoma

- Date: November 29
- Game time: 2:00 p.m. CST
- Game weather: Cloudy • Temperature: 52 °F (11 °C) • Wind: SW at 14 miles per hour (23 km/h)
- Game attendance: 13,026
- Referee: Steven Anderson
- TV announcers (ESPN+): James Westling (play-by-play), Reggie Walker (analyst) and Smacker Miles (sideline)
- Recap

Game information

First quarter

- (7:13) UAB – Iverson Hooks 8-yard pass from Jalen Kitna, Jonah Delange kick (Drive: 5 plays, 44 yards, 1:51; UAB 7–0)
- (3:30) TLSA – Seth Morgan 26-yard field goal (Drive: 9 plays, 65 yards, 3:38; UAB 7–3)

Second quarter

- (7:51) TLSA – Jewlyen Roberts 1-yard pass from Baylor Hayes, Seth Morgan kick (Drive: 7 plays, 39 yards, 3:09; Tulsa 10–7)
- (1:42) UAB – Jonah Delange 31-yard field goal (Drive: 14 plays, 62 yards, 6:09; Tied 10–10)
- (0:32) TLSA – Braylin Presley 5-yard run, Seth Morgan kick (Drive: 5 plays, 67 yards, 1:06; Tulsa 17–10)

Third quarter

- (10:24) UAB – Brandon Hawkins Jr. 8-yard pass from Jalen Kitna, Jonah Delange kick (Drive: 10 plays, 74 yards, 4:36; Tied 17–17)

Fourth quarter

- (14:55) TLSA – Ajay Allen 22-yard run, Seth Morgan kick (Drive: 9 plays, 85 yards, 3:31; Tulsa 24–17)
- (10:42) UAB – Jevon Jackson 22-yard run, Jonah Delange kick (Drive: 4 plays, 31 yards, 1:47; Tied 24–24)
- (3:40) UAB – Jevon Jackson 3-yard run, Jonah Delange kick (Drive: 10 plays, 90 yards, 5:13; UAB 31–24)

Statistics	UAB	TLSA
First downs	19	19
Plays–yards	73–395	64–357
Rushes–yards	55–229	42–198
Passing yards	166	159
Passing: comp–att–int	14–18–1	11–22–1
Turnovers	1	2
Time of possession	35:23	24:37

Team	Category	Player	Statistics
UAB	Passing	Jalen Kitna	14/17, 166 yards, 2 TD
UAB	Rushing	Jevon Jackson	23 carries, 117 yards, 2 TD
UAB	Receiving	Kaleb Brown	2 receptions, 61 yards
Tulsa	Passing	Baylor Hayes	11/22, 159 yards, TD, INT
Tulsa	Rushing	Ajay Allen	27 carries, 129 yards, TD
Tulsa	Receiving	Zion Steptoe	3 receptions, 59 yards
