= Northside High School (Warner Robins, Georgia) =

American public high school

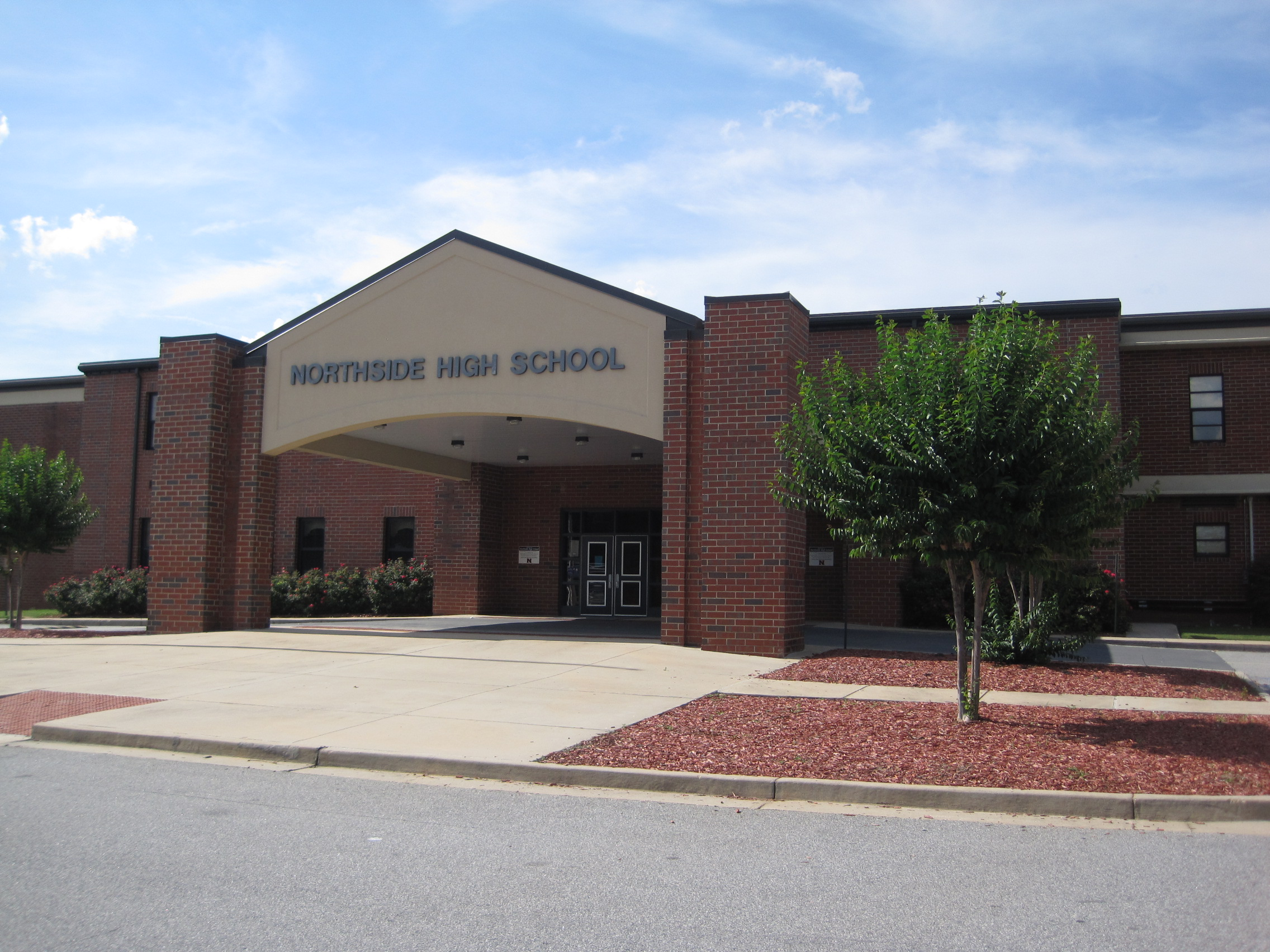

Location
- 926 Green Street; Warner Robins, Georgia 31093; United States; 32°37′37″N 83°37′52″W

Information
- Type: Public high school
- Mottoes: It's great to be a Northside Eagle (IGTBANE). Tradition•Family•Excellence
- Established: 1963; 63 years ago
- School district: Houston County Schools
- Principal: Dustin Dykes
- Staff: 116.30 (FTE)
- Faculty: 120
- Grades: 9–12
- Student to teacher ratio: 16.64
- Colors: Blue and white
- Athletics: GHSA
- Athletics conference: AAAAAA (6A) Region 1
- Mascot: Eagle
- Rival: Warner Robins Demons
- Website: nhs.hcbe.net

Northside High School is a high school in Warner Robins, Georgia, United States. Located at 926 Green Street on the northern side of Warner Robins, it was built in 1963 and enrolls approximately 1827 students. It is a part of Houston County Schools.

Northside's mascot is the eagle. Its official colors are blue and white, though orange is also commonly used.

== History ==
Northside High School originally opened in 1963 as the second high school to be built in Warner Robins, after Warner Robins High School.

== Campus ==
Many cosmetic changes were implemented starting in 2001. At the end of the 2004-2005 school year, the school began renovation projects to increase the size of the school. Northside was last renovated during 2005 and 2006. This most recent renovation included a new commons area, an expanded lobby, a bigger cafeteria which connects the Vocational Building with the main building, an expansion of the Technology lab and the band room, and a new gymnasium. Construction ended during the 2006-2007 school year.

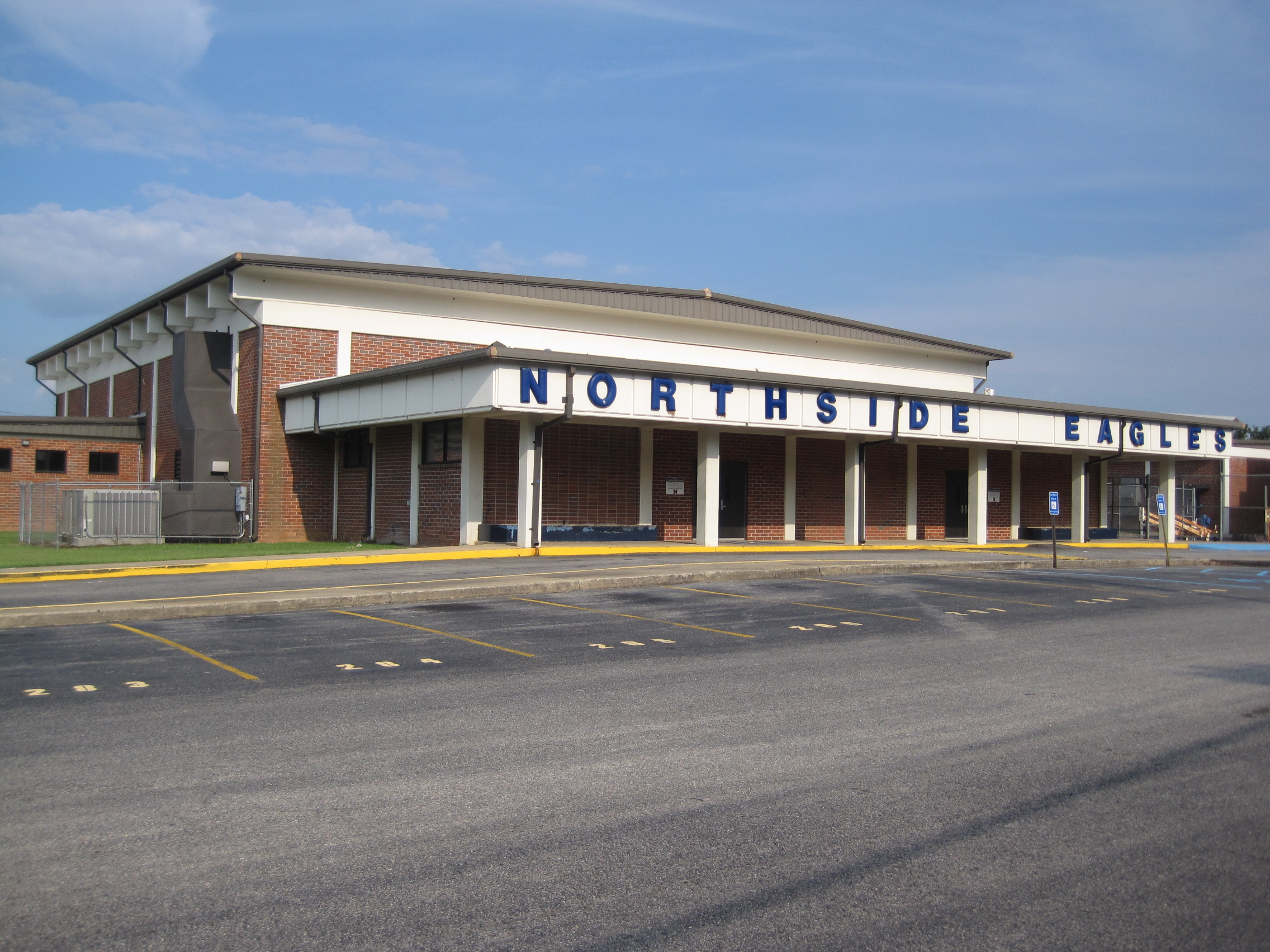
Gymnasium at Northside High

=== Tabor Academy ===
In 2004, Tabor Middle School became Tabor Academy at Northside, a 9th grade-only school which introduces 9th grade students to the high school atmosphere.

== Extracurricular activities ==
=== Athletics ===
The school sponsored athletic teams are football, cross country, volleyball, softball, cheerleading (competition, football, and basketball), basketball, swimming, wrestling, soccer, baseball, track, tennis, and golf. There is a bass fishing team under the Houston County Bass Angler Federation, not associated with any state or national organization.

In 1998, Northside Eagle ladies' track team won state in the 100 meters.

=== Football ===
Home football games for the Northside Eagles are played at McConnell-Talbert Stadium.

The Northside Eagles football team have had winning seasons for 22 consecutive years; they are 146-15 from 1998 to the present. Northside had 17 consecutive seasons with 10 or more wins from 1998-2014.

From 1998 to 2005, the school had five teams go 10-0 in the regular season but falter in the playoffs. In 2006 and 2007, the school broke through with consecutive 15-0 finishes in Class 4-A, and won two state championships.

In 2009 the Eagles had wins against Lowndes (#1 in the state, #4 in the nation), Valdosta, and Newnan (#2 in the state, #10 in the nation) in the semi-finals, leading the way for the Eagles to contest for the 5A state championship in 2009, which they lost against Camden County (December 12) at the Georgia Dome (31-3). Northside was moved back down to 4-A due to lack of enough students to remain in the 5-A classification.

Northside won the 5A Georgia State Football Championship in 2014. This brought their total number of state titles to three, with three state runner-up titles.

Since 1999, Northside has had nine semi-final appearances and six final appearances in the play-offs, making it to the second round or higher every year, except 2010.

=== The Blue Wind Band ===
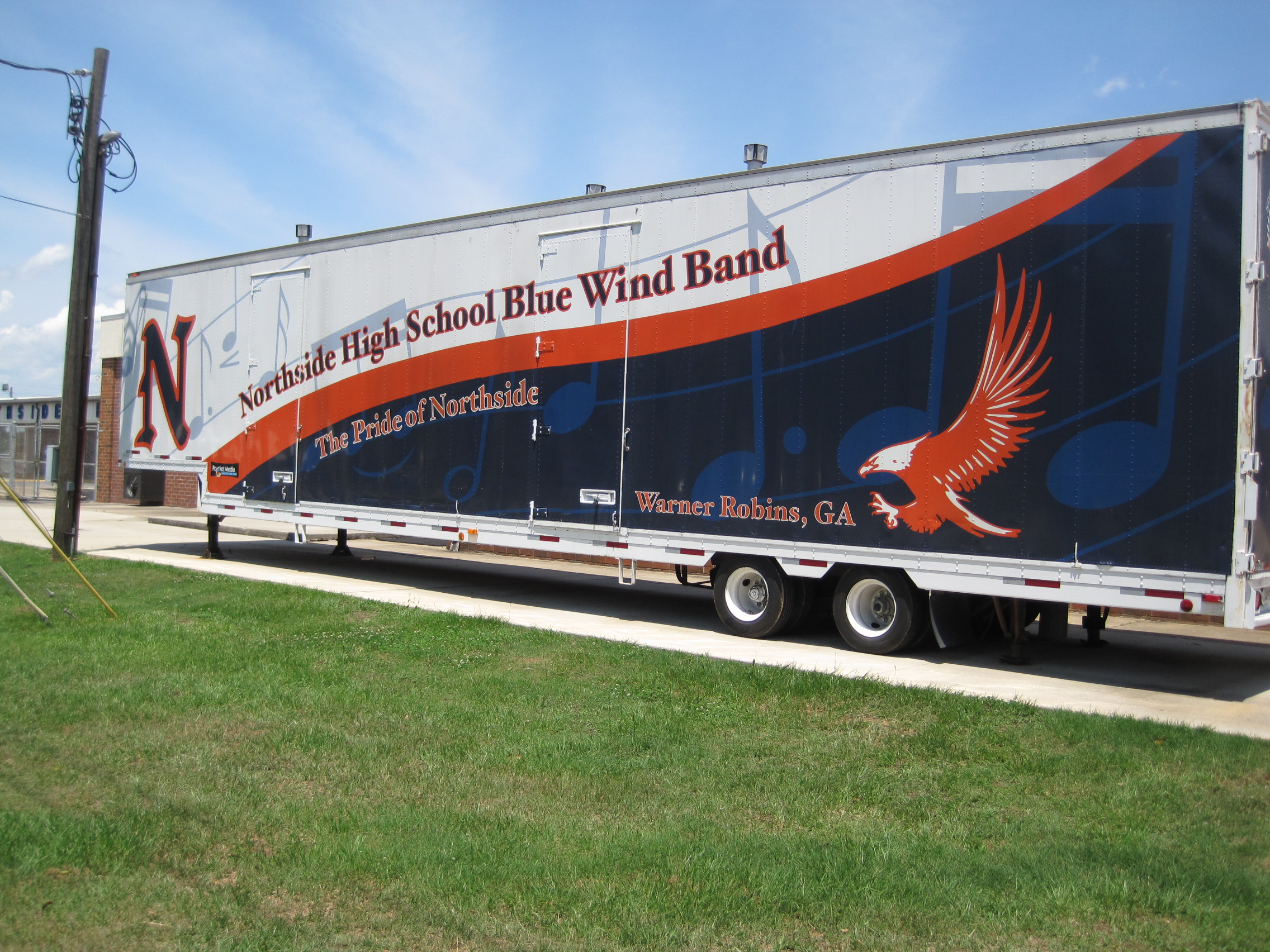
Trailer used by the Blue Wind band for road trips

In the 2011-2012 school year, the band won first place in class 3A East Georgia Marching Festival, and third place, overall band of the day. They received Superior ratings at LGPE Symphonic Band, and Excellent ratings at Concert Band LGPE. Their marching show was "The Music of Journey."

=== Show choir ===
The school has a show choir program, integrating fundamentals of dance and vocal music.

=== One-act play ===
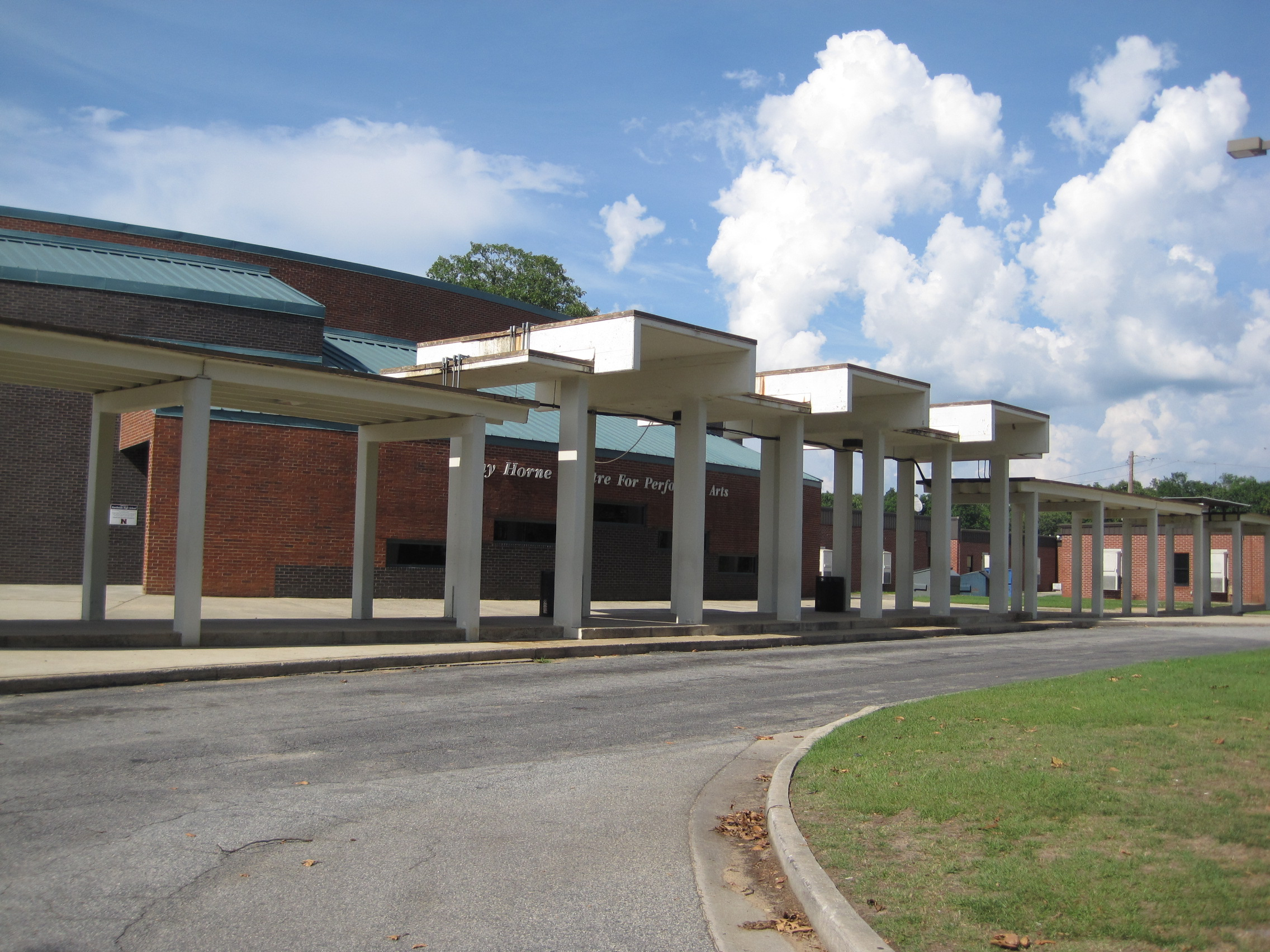
Ray Horne Center for the Performing Arts

Northside has an annual one-act play. Over the years, Northside productions have participated in the GHSA One-Act Competition, the Georgia Theatre Conference, Georgia Thespian Conference, International Thespian Festival (held annually in Lincoln, Nebraska; held in Muncie, Indiana prior to Lincoln), and the Southeastern Theatre Conference. Northside placed at the GHSA State One-Act Play Competition 34 years in a row, 1974-2008. Overall, Northside has finished first or second 28 times, 19 of those as State Champion. Northside was State One-Act Champion in 1978, 1979, 1981, 1982, 1985, 1987, 1994, 1995, 1996, 1997, 2000, 2006, 2007, 2008, 2010, 2011, 2012, 2013, 2014, and 2016. Until the 1980s, the GHSA State One-Act Competition was held in late January or early February. During the 1990s it was held the first weekend in December. It is now held in mid-November. School holds state record for number of One-Act Play State Championships.

=== Literary ===
The GHSA State Literary Contest has ten events: Boys'/Girls' Dramatic Interpretation, Boys'/Girls' Essay, Boys'/Girls' Extemporaneous Speaking, Boys'/Girls' Solo, Trio and Quartet. Until the 1999-2000 school year, One-Act Play and Debate were also included in the total points calculated for the literary events. Northside has placed as one of the top three schools 33 times and finished as State Literary Champion 20 times.

Northside was State Literary Champion in 1969, 1975, 1976, 1978, 1979, 1981, 1987, 1989, 1991, 1992, 1994, 1995, 1996, 1997, 2000, 2001, 2003, 2004, 2007, 2008, and 2013.

=== Yearbook ===
The Aquila is Northside's yearbook created by members of the school's yearbook staff.

=== State titles ===
- Girls' Basketball (2) - 1967(2A), 1968(2A)
- Boys' Cross Country (1) - 1959(Open)
- Football (3) - 2006(4A), 2007(4A), 2014(5A)
- Girls' Swimming (1) - 1956(Open)

=== Other GHSA state titles ===
- Literary (22) - 1968(2A), 1969(3A), 1976(3A), 1978(3A), 1979(4A), 1981(4A), 1982(4A), 1987(4A), 1989(4A), 1991(4A), 1992(4A), 1994(4A), 1995(4A), 1996(4A), 1997(4A), 2000(4A), 2001(5A), 2003(5A), 2004(5A), 2007(4A), 2008(4A), 2013(5A)
- One Act Play (9) - 2006(4A), 2007(4A), 2008(5A), 2010(4A), 2011(4A), 2012(5A), 2013(5A), 2014(5A), 2016(6A)

== Notable alumni ==
- Tae Daley, CFL player for the Calgary Stampeders
- Kal Daniels, former Major League Baseball player
- Robert Davis, former NFL player
- Corey Harris, former NFL player
- Abry Jones, former NFL player
- Steven Nelson, NFL player
- Tobias Oliver, Georgia Tech quarterback
- David Perdue, United States Ambassador to China, former US Senator
- Chansi Stuckey, former NFL player and coach
