= Kanorris Davis =

American football player (born 1990)

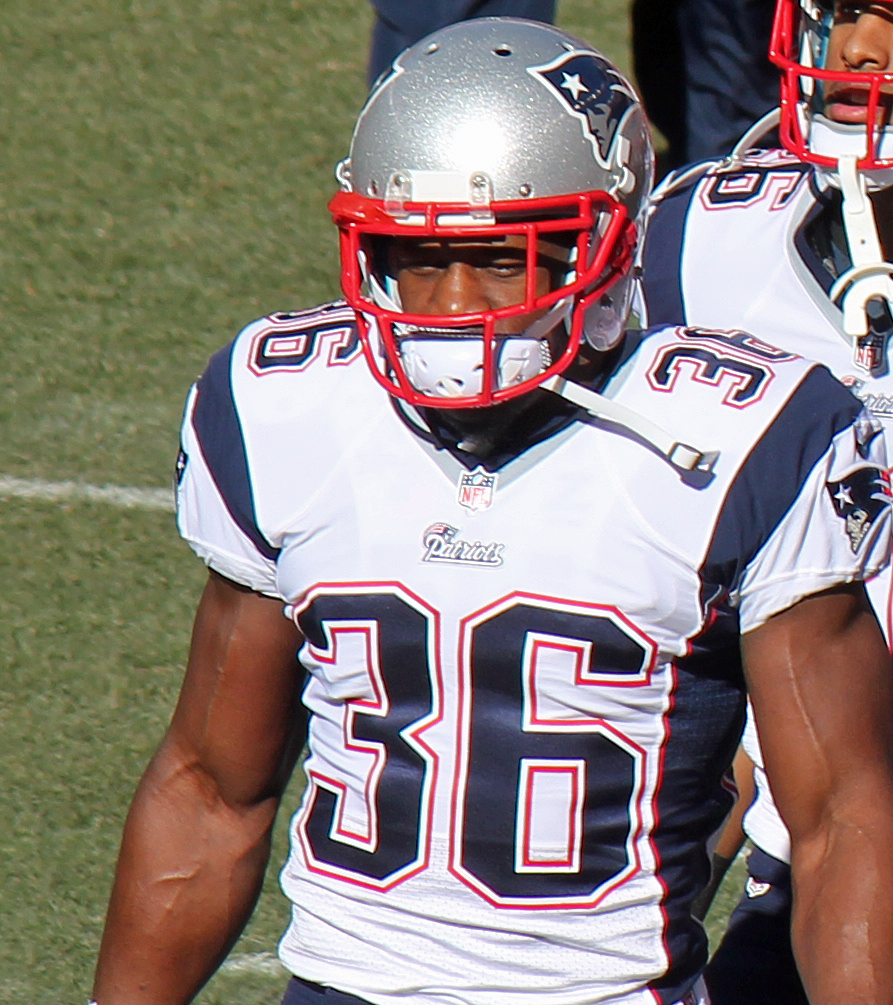
- Davis with the New England Patriots in January 2014

No. 36
- Positions: Linebacker, safety

Personal information
- Born: January 21, 1990 (age 36); Perry, Georgia, U.S.
- Listed height: 5 ft 10 in (1.78 m)
- Listed weight: 203 lb (92 kg)

Career information
- High school: Perry
- College: Troy
- NFL draft: 2013: undrafted

Career history
- New England Patriots (2013); Toronto Argonauts (2016)*
- * Offseason or practice squad member only

Awards and highlights
- Second-team All-Sun Belt (2012)

Career NFL statistics
- Tackles: 1
- Interceptions: 0
- Forced fumbles: 0
- Stats at Pro Football Reference

Kanorris Davis (born January 21, 1990) is an American former professional football player who was a safety and linebacker for the New England Patriots of the National Football League (NFL). He played college football for the Troy Trojans. He was also a member of the Toronto Argonauts of the Canadian Football League (CFL).

== Early life ==
He attended Perry High School in Georgia. He was a three-time first-team selection for each all-district, all-area, and all-region teams. He was selected to the second-team all-state team in sophomore year in high school. He was named to both North and South Classic All-State Team. He was selected all-state team twice along with being named region defensive player of the year twice while in high school. He set the school record most tackles in a single season along with setting another school record for sacks in a single year with 9 total sacks. He finished high school football with a total of 398 tackles, 24 sacks and 8 forced fumbles. He also competed in track & field. He was the Class 3A state runner-up in the 100 meters (10.94), with a best of 10.84 seconds in 2008. He ran on a state qualifying 1600 relay team (3:23.28) in 2007.

== College career ==
He played college football as a linebacker for Troy University. He was named as All-Sun Belt Honorable Mention in 2011.

== Professional career ==
=== New England Patriots ===
On May 3, 2013, Davis signed with the New England Patriots as an undrafted free agent. On September 1, 2013, he was signed to the practice squad. On September 30, he was released On October 2 Davis was re-signed to the Patriots practice squad He played defensive back for the Patriots.

=== Toronto Argonauts ===
Davis was signed by the Toronto Argonauts on February 8, 2016, to play linebacker. Davis suffered a severe knee injury during team practice on May 31, 2016, and was ruled out indefinitely for the 2016 CFL season. He was released by the team on June 5, 2016.
