= Log Dogtrot House =

Historic house in Georgia, United States

- U.S. National Register of Historic Places
- Location within Georgia
- Nearest city: Kathleen, Georgia
- Coordinates: 32°29′45″N 83°36′04″W
- Area: 1 acre (0.40 ha)
- Built: 1834
- Built by: Denhard, Hugh
- Architectural style: Dogtrot
- NRHP reference No.: 91000681
- Added to NRHP: May 30, 1991

The Log Dogtrot House, near Kathleen, Georgia in Houston County, Georgia, was built in 1834. It was listed on the National Register of Historic Places in 1991.

Also known as the Robert C. Bryan House, it is a dogtrot-style log house built of hand-hewn timbers. It was built by Hugh Denhard.

It is located 0.5 mi. east of junction of Georgia State Route 247 and Story St., near Kathleen, Georgia.

The listing has a second contributing building, which is a "one-room, wood-framed building that may have served as a kitchen. The building sits on stone piers (one has been replaced with concrete blocks), has a front-gabled corrugated metal roof, and is covered with weatherboarding. There is a brick flue on the interior of the building. At one time a covered breezeway connected this outbuilding with the rear of the house. An old hand-operated water siphon pump that may date from the turn of the century still stands in the yard."
