= Tae Daley =

American football player (born 1998)

No. 33
- Position: Defensive back

Personal information
- Born: October 8, 1998 (age 28); Miami, Florida, U.S.
- Listed height: 5 ft 11 in (1.80 m)
- Listed weight: 203 lb (92 kg)

Career information
- High school: Northside (Warner Robins, Georgia)
- College: Vanderbilt (2017–2019); Virginia Tech (2021)
- NFL draft: 2022: undrafted

Career history
- 2022: Arizona Cardinals
- 2023: Calgary Stampeders
- Stats at CFL.ca

O’montae Devondre Daley (born October 8, 1998) is an American former professional football defensive back who played for the Calgary Stampeders of the Canadian Football League (CFL). He played college football at Vanderbilt and Virginia Tech. He was also a member of the Arizona Cardinals of the National Football League (NFL).

== Early life ==
O’montae Devondre Daley was born on October 8, 1998, in Miami, Florida. He played high school football at Northside High School in Warner Robins, Georgia. He recorded 84 tackles, five interceptions, eight pass breakups and four forced fumbles his senior year. He also lettered in soccer in high school.

== College career ==
Daley played college football at Vanderbilt from 2017 to 2019. In 2017, he received a non-critical gunshot wound to the leg after trying to help his teammate recover a stolen cell phone. He played in 11 games in 2017, totaling five tackles. Daley appeared in 13 games, starting eight, in 2018, accumulating 45 tackles, and three pass breakups. Daley played in nine games, all starts, in 2019, recording 57 tackles, three interceptions and one forced fumble. He opted out of the 2020 season due to the COVID-19 pandemic.

Daley transferred to play at Virginia Tech in 2021. He appeared in 13 games, starting 10, recording 73 tackles, one pass breakup and one forced fumble. He was invited to the 2022 Tropical Bowl.

== Professional career ==
Pre-draft measurables
Height	Weight	Arm length	Hand span	40-yard dash	10-yard split	20-yard split	20-yard shuttle	Three-cone drill	Vertical jump	Broad jump	Bench press
5 ft 10 7/8 in (1.80 m)	201 lb (91 kg)	32 1/4 in (0.82 m)	8 3/8 in (0.21 m)	4.65 s	1.62 s	2.66 s	4.21 s	7.22 s	33.0 in (0.84 m)	9 ft 3 in (2.82 m)	12 reps
All values from Pro Day

Daley signed with the Arizona Cardinals of the National Football League (NFL) on May 16, 2022, after going undrafted in the 2022 NFL draft. He was waived/injured on August 30, and reverted to injured reserve on August 31. He was waived from injured reserve on November 29, 2022.

Daley was signed by the Calgary Stampeders of the Canadian Football League (CFL) on May 26, 2023. He was moved between the practice roster and active roster several times during the 2023 season before being placed on injured reserve on July 29, 2023. Overall, he dressed in three games, starting two, in 2023, recording five tackles on defense and one special teams tackle.
