= Kyle Moore =

American football player (born 1986)

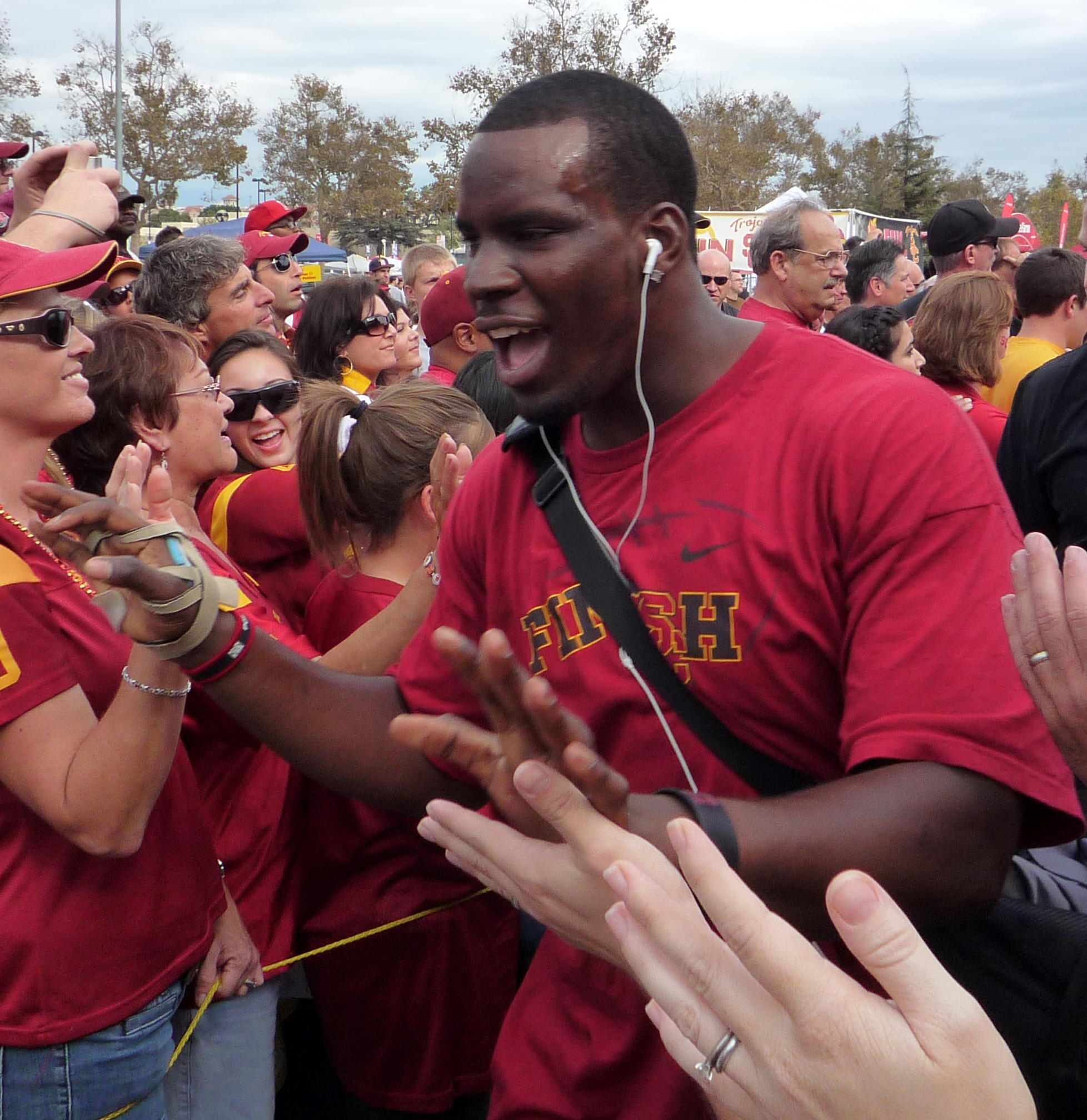
- Moore on USC's traditional pregame walk to the stadium

No. 94, 54
- Position: Defensive end

Personal information
- Born: October 25, 1986 (age 40); West Germany
- Listed height: 6 ft 7 in (2.01 m)
- Listed weight: 263 lb (119 kg)

Career information
- High school: Houston County (Warner Robins, Georgia, U.S.)
- College: USC
- NFL draft: 2009: 4th round, 117th overall pick

Career history
- Tampa Bay Buccaneers (2009−2010); Detroit Lions (2011)*; Buffalo Bills (2011−2012); Chicago Bears (2013)*; Toronto Argonauts (2014–2015)
- * Offseason or practice squad member only

Career NFL statistics
- Total tackles: 56
- Sacks: 3
- Stats at Pro Football Reference

Kyle Moore (born October 25, 1986) is an American former professional football player who was a defensive end in the National Football League (NFL). He played college football for the USC Trojans and was selected by the Tampa Bay Buccaneers in the fourth round of the 2009 NFL draft. Moore was also a member of the Detroit Lions, Buffalo Bills, Chicago Bears, and Toronto Argonauts.

== Early life ==
An army brat born in Germany, Moore attended Houston County High School in Warner Robins, Georgia, where he was named Georgia Class 5A Defensive Player of the Year as a senior defensive lineman. He had 93 tackles, 22 sacks, 18 deflections, 8 forced fumbles, 2 fumble recoveries and 1 blocked punt (for a touchdown) in 2004.

As a junior in 2003, he made All-Middle Georgia, All-Region and All-County while getting 110 tackles, 23 tackles for loss and 15 sacks. Moore was rated a Four-Star recruit and chose USC over Miami.

== College career ==
At USC, Moore served as a backup defensive end as a true freshman and sophomore. In 2007, he did a solid job while starting at defensive end, recording 35 tackles, including 3.5 for losses of 29 yards (with 2 sacks for 20 yards), plus 2 interceptions that he returned 38 yards (19.0 avg.), 5 deflections, 1 forced fumble and 1 fumble recovery.

In 2008 Moore had arthroscopic surgery on his knee prior to 2008 spring practice, which limited him in spring drills. He started at defensive end alongside Everson Griffen.

Moore was one of twelve USC players invited to the 2009 NFL Scouting Combine.

=== College awards and honors ===
- 2009 Senior Bowl invitee.
- 2008 All-Pac-10 Honorable Mention.
- 2008 USC Most Inspirational Player.

== Professional career ==
Pre-draft measurables
| Height | Weight | 40-yard dash | 20-yard shuttle | Three-cone drill | Vertical jump | Broad jump | Bench press |
|---|---|---|---|---|---|---|---|
| 6 ft 5 in (1.96 m) | 272 lb (123 kg) | 4.76 s | 4.47 s | 7.40 s | 30 1/2 in (0.77 m) | 8 ft 9 in (2.67 m) | 22 reps |
All values from NFL Combine.

=== Tampa Bay Buccaneers ===
Moore was selected by the Tampa Bay Buccaneers in the fourth round (117th overall) of the 2009 NFL draft. He played in just 15 games (7 of them starts) as a Buccaneer in 2 years due to injuries. He was released on September 2, 2011.

=== Buffalo Bills ===
The Buffalo Bills signed Moore off of the Detroit Lions' practice squad on November 15, 2011.

=== Chicago Bears ===
On April 9, 2013, Moore was signed by the Chicago Bears. He was waived on August 25.

=== Toronto Argonauts ===
Moore was signed by the Toronto Argonauts on April 4, 2014, along with his former USC teammate, Kevin Thomas.
