= AJ Hill =

American football player (born 2007)

No. 2 – Arkansas Razorbacks
- Position: Quarterback
- Class: Sophomore

Personal information
- Born: July 13, 2007 (age 19)
- Listed height: 6 ft 4 in (1.93 m)
- Listed weight: 232 lb (105 kg)

Career information
- High school: Houston County (Warner Robins, Georgia)
- College: Memphis (2025); Arkansas (2026–present)
- Stats at ESPN

Antwann Hill Jr. (born July 13, 2007) is an American college football quarterback for the Arkansas Razorbacks. He previously played for the Memphis Tigers.

== Early life ==
Hill attended Houston County High School in Warner Robins, Georgia. As a sophomore he threw for 3,663 yards, 40 touchdowns and three interceptions. As a junior Hill threw for 2,732 yards with 31 touchdowns to five interceptions, while also adding three touchdowns on the ground.

=== Recruiting ===
Hill received his first scholarship from the Georgia Bulldogs prior to his freshman year. He was rated as a four-star recruit and received additional offers from schools such as Alabama, Auburn, Colorado, Florida, Florida State, Memphis, and Notre Dame. Hill committed to play college football for the Colorado Buffaloes under head coach Deion Sanders. However, soon afterwards, Hill de-committed and re-opened his recruitment. Hill eventually committed to play for the Memphis Tigers.

== College career ==
As a freshman in 2025, Hill threw for 223 yards with a touchdown and an interception. On December 21, 2025, he announced that he would enter the NCAA transfer portal.

On January 5, 2026, Hill announced his decision to transfer to the University of Arkansas to play for the Arkansas Razorbacks.

=== Statistics ===
Season	Team	Games			Passing								Rushing			
Season	Team	GP	GS	Record	Comp	Att	Pct	Yards	Avg	TD	Int	Rate	Att	Yards	Avg	TD
2025	Memphis	2	0	—	19	32	59.4	223	7.0	1	1	122.0	1	-6	-6.0	0
2026	Arkansas	1	0	—	8	14	57.1	105	7.5	1	0	143.7	3	-24	-8	0
Career		3	0	0–0	27	46	58.7	328	7.1	2	1	128.6	4	-30	-7.5	0

== Personal life ==
Hill is the cousin of NFL offensive lineman Trey Hill.
