= Houston County Schools =

School district in Georgia (U.S. state)

Houston County School District

Address
- 1200 Main Street Perry, Georgia, 31069-3533; United States
- Coordinates: 32.458966°N 83.728465°W

District information
- Grades: Pre-school - 12
- Superintendent: Richard Rodgers
- Accreditations: Southern Association of Colleges and Schools; Georgia Accrediting Commission
- NCES District ID: 1302880

Students and staff
- Enrollment: 29,681 (2020-2021)
- Faculty: 1,974 (on an FTE basis)
- Student–teacher ratio: 15.04

Other information
- P.O. Box: P.O. Box 1850, Perry, Georgia 31069
- Website: www.hcbe.net

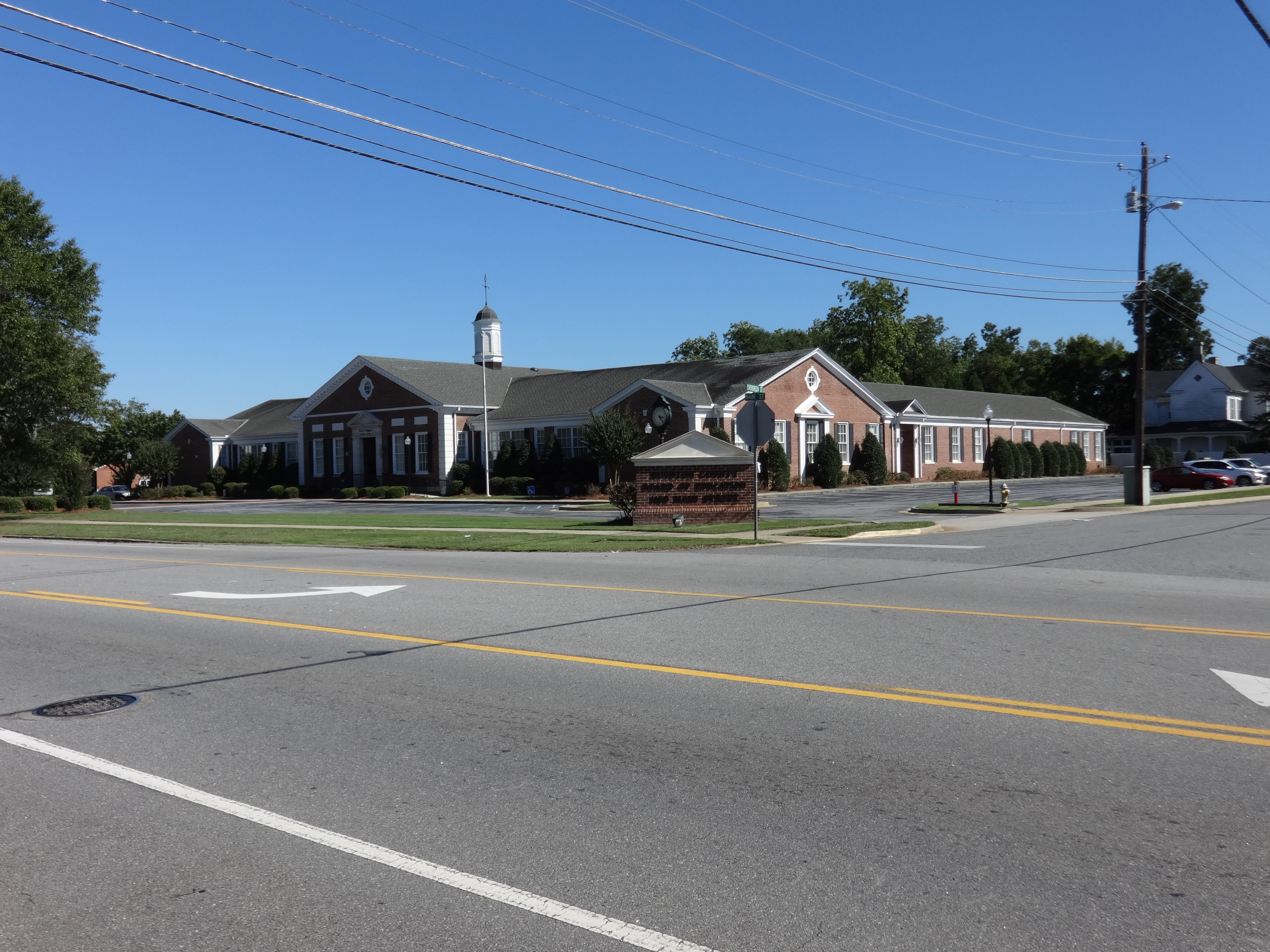
District headquarters

Houston County Schools is the county government agency which operates the public schools in Houston County, Georgia, United States.

It is the only school district in the county.

== List of schools ==
=== Elementary and primary schools ===
Primary schools, such as David Perdue Primary in the following list, cater to grades Pre-K through 2nd, and usually function as adjuncts to the elementary schools of the same name (e.g. David Perdue Elementary).

Name	Grades	Address	City	Principal
Matt Arthur Elementary	3 - 5	2500 Highway 127	Kathleen	Varee Harrell
Matt Arthur Primary	Pre k - 2	2500 GA-127	Kathleen	Alicia Gunner
Bonaire Elementary	3 - 5	101 Elm Street	Bonaire	Catherine Gardner
Bonaire Primary	Pre K - 2	535 Thompson Mill Road	Bonaire	Elgin Mayfield
C.B. Watson Primary	Pre K - 2	61 Martin Luther King Jr Boulevard	Warner Robins	Alicia Conner
Centerville Elementary	Pre K - 5	450 Houston Lake Boulevard	Centerville	Ruthann Bowden
Eagle Springs Elementary	Pre K - 5	Highway 41 North	Byron	Jeff Washington
Hilltop Elementary	Pre K - 5	301 Robert Bryson Parkway	Bonaire	Ovedia Glover
Kings Chapel Elementary	Pre K - 5	460 Arena Road	Perry	William Ray
Lake Joy Elementary	3 - 5	985 Lake Joy Road	Warner Robins	Tami Godman
Lake Joy Primary	Pre K - 2	995 Lake Joy Road	Warner Robins	Sonya Kiefer
Langston Road Elementary	3 - 5	315 Langston Road	Perry	Kelly Rush
Langston Road Primary	Pre K - 2	315 Langston Road	Perry	Kelly Rush
Miller Elementary	Pre K - 5	101 Pine Valley Drive	Warner Robins	Elizabeth Johnson
Morningside Elementary	Pre K - 5	1206 Morningside Drive	Perry	Kassandra King
Northside Elementary	Pre K - 5	305 Sullivan Road	Warner Robins	David Sams
Parkwood Primary	Pre K - 2	503 Parkwood Drive	Warner Robins	Kelly Munn
David Perdue Elementary	3 - 5	115 Sutherlin Drive	Warner Robins	Andy Payne
David Perdue Primary	Pre K - 2	150 Bear Country Boulevard	Warner Robins	Kathy Gibbs
Quail Run Elementary	Pre K - 5	250 Smithville Church Road	Warner Robins	Amanda Miliner
Russell Elementary	Pre K - 5	101 Patriot Way	Warner Robins	William Wilson
Shirley Hills Elementary	Pre K - 5	300 Mary Lane	Warner Robins	Traci Jackson
Pearl Stephens Elementary	3 - 5	420 Pearl Stephens Way	Warner Robins	Gloria Smith
Tucker Elementary	Pre K - 5	1300 Tucker Road	Perry	Eddie Williams
Westside Elementary	3 - 5	201 North Pleasant Hill Road	Warner Robins	Cynthia Hammond

=== Middle schools ===
Name	Grades	Address	City	Principal
Bonaire Middle	6 - 8	125 Highway 96 East	Bonaire	Rebecca Oakley
Feagin Mill Middle	6 - 8	1200 Feagin Mill Road	Warner Robins	Elizabeth Foster
Huntington Middle	6 - 8	206 Wellborn Road	Warner Robins	Gwendolyn Taylor
Mossy Creek Middle	6 - 8	200 Danny Carpenter Drive	Kathleen	Jody Dean
Northside Middle	6 - 8	500 Johnson Road	Warner Robins	Alma Mundy
Perry Middle	6 - 8	495 Perry Parkway	Perry	Heath Burch
Thomson Middle	6 - 8	301 Thomson Street	Centerville	Scott Wynn
Warner Robins Middle	6 - 8	425 Mary Lane	Warner Robins	Steven Ruzic
Veterans Middle	6 - 8	TBD	Kathleen	TBD

=== High schools ===
Name	Grades	Address	City	Principal
HC Career Academy	9 - 12	1311 Corder Road	Warner Robins	Sherry Johnson
Houston County High	9 - 12	920 Highway 96	Warner Robins	Jay Jones
Northside High	9 - 12	926 Green Street	Warner Robins	Dustin Dykes
Perry High	9 - 12	1307 North Avenue	Perry	Arthur Billings
Veterans High	9 - 12	340 Piney Grove Road	Kathleen	Amy Barbour
Warner Robins High	9 - 12	401 South Davis Drive	Warner Robins	Brett Wallace

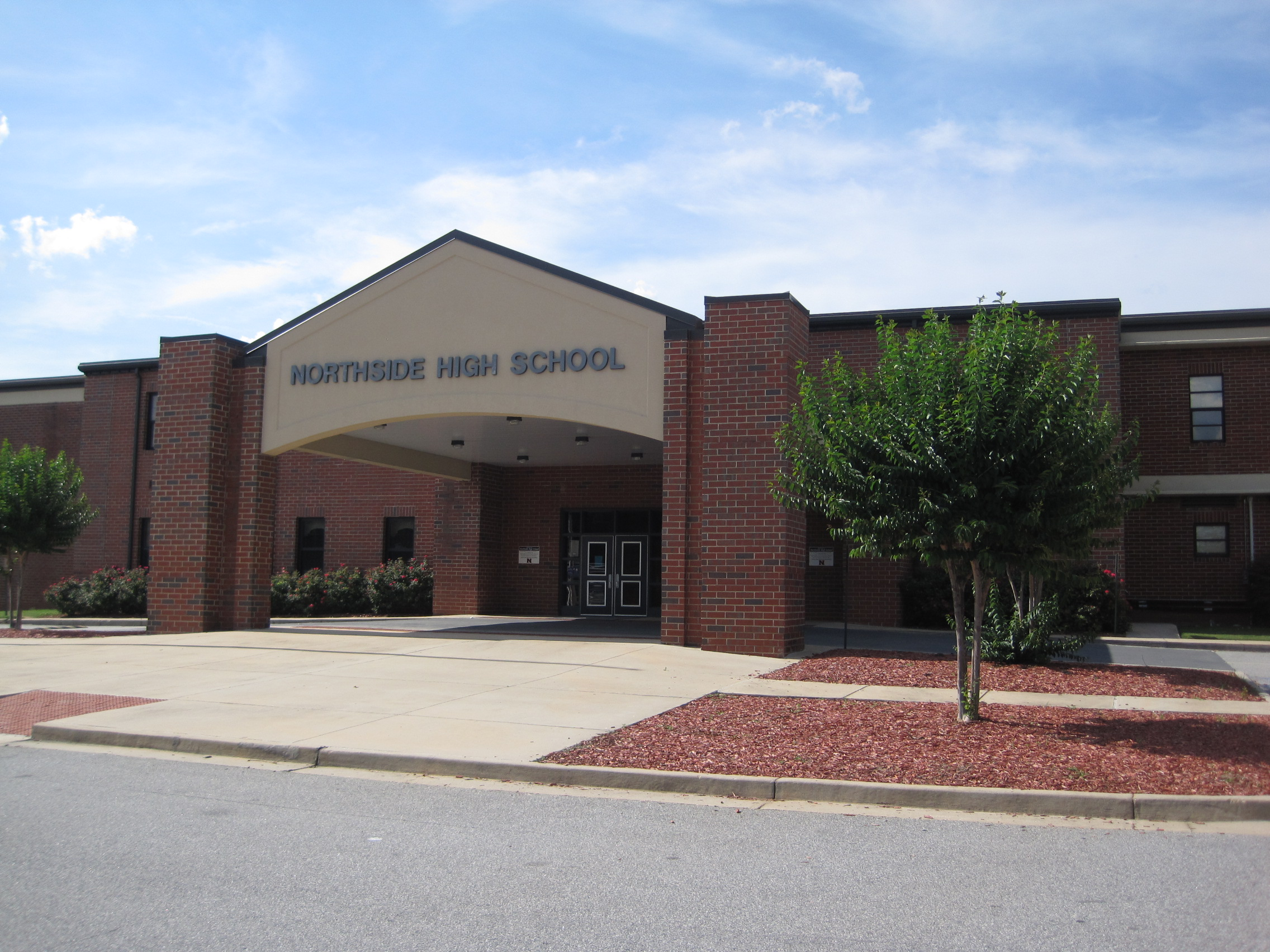
Northside High School

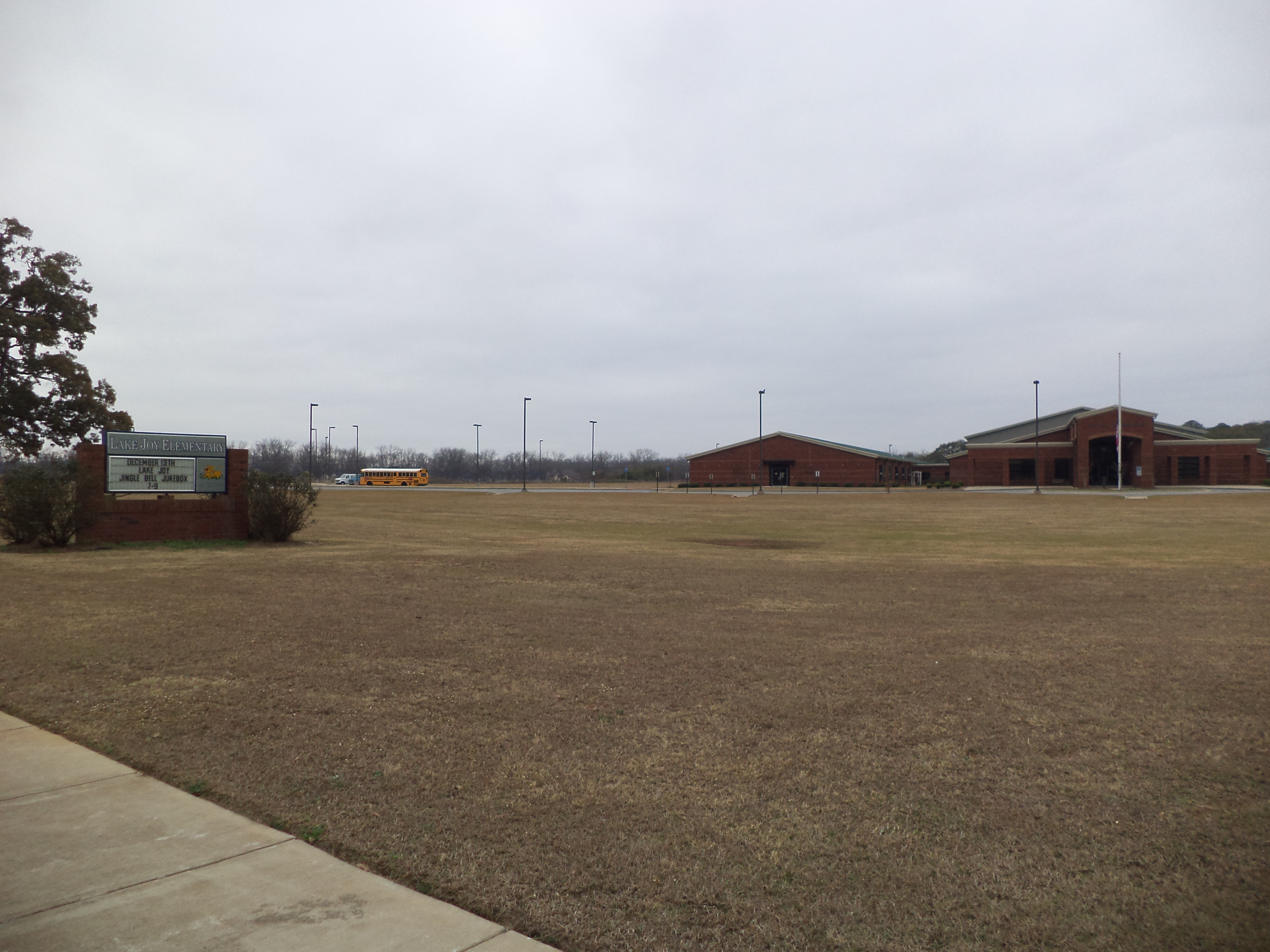
Lake Joy Elementary School

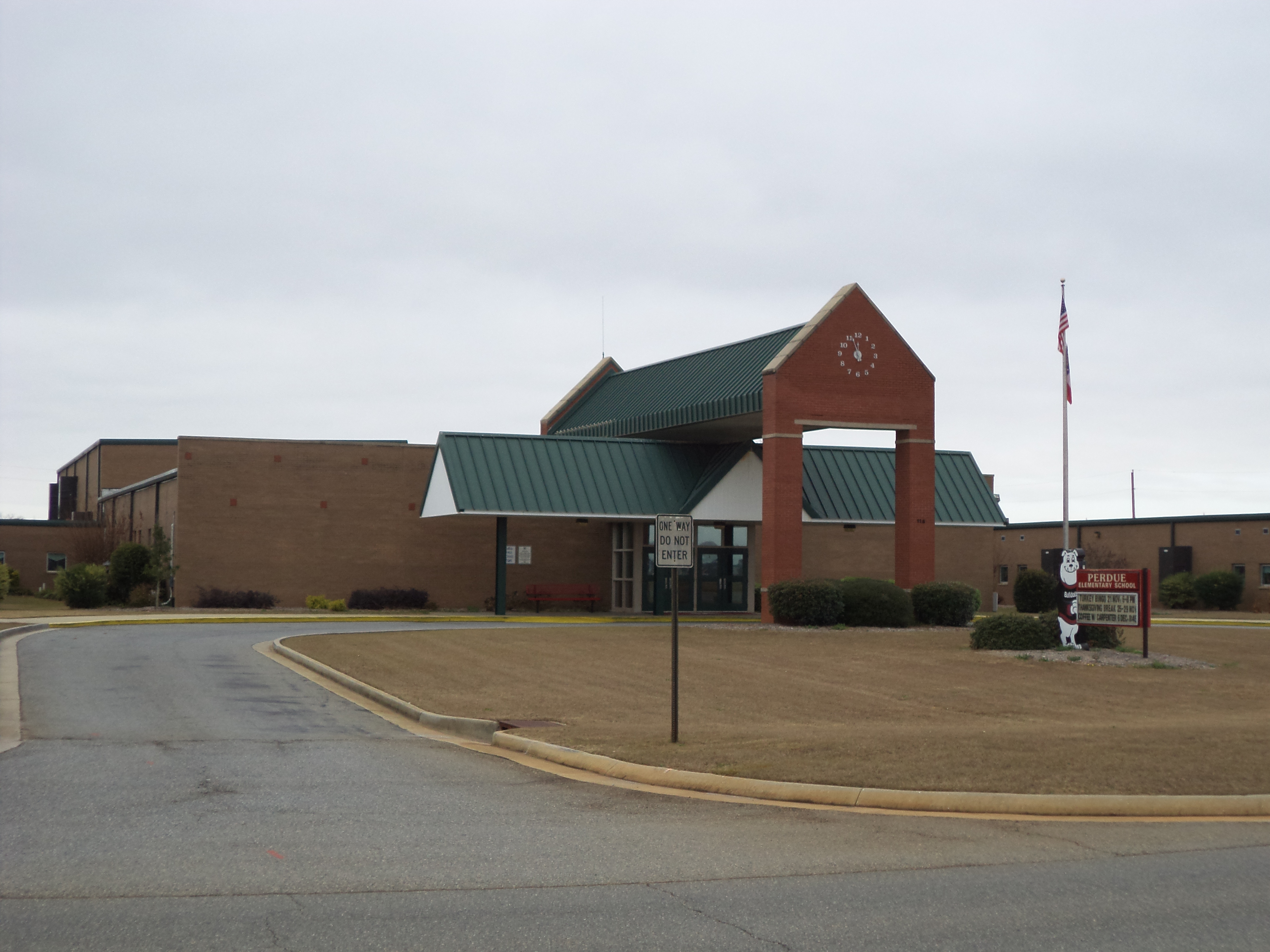
Perdue Elementary School

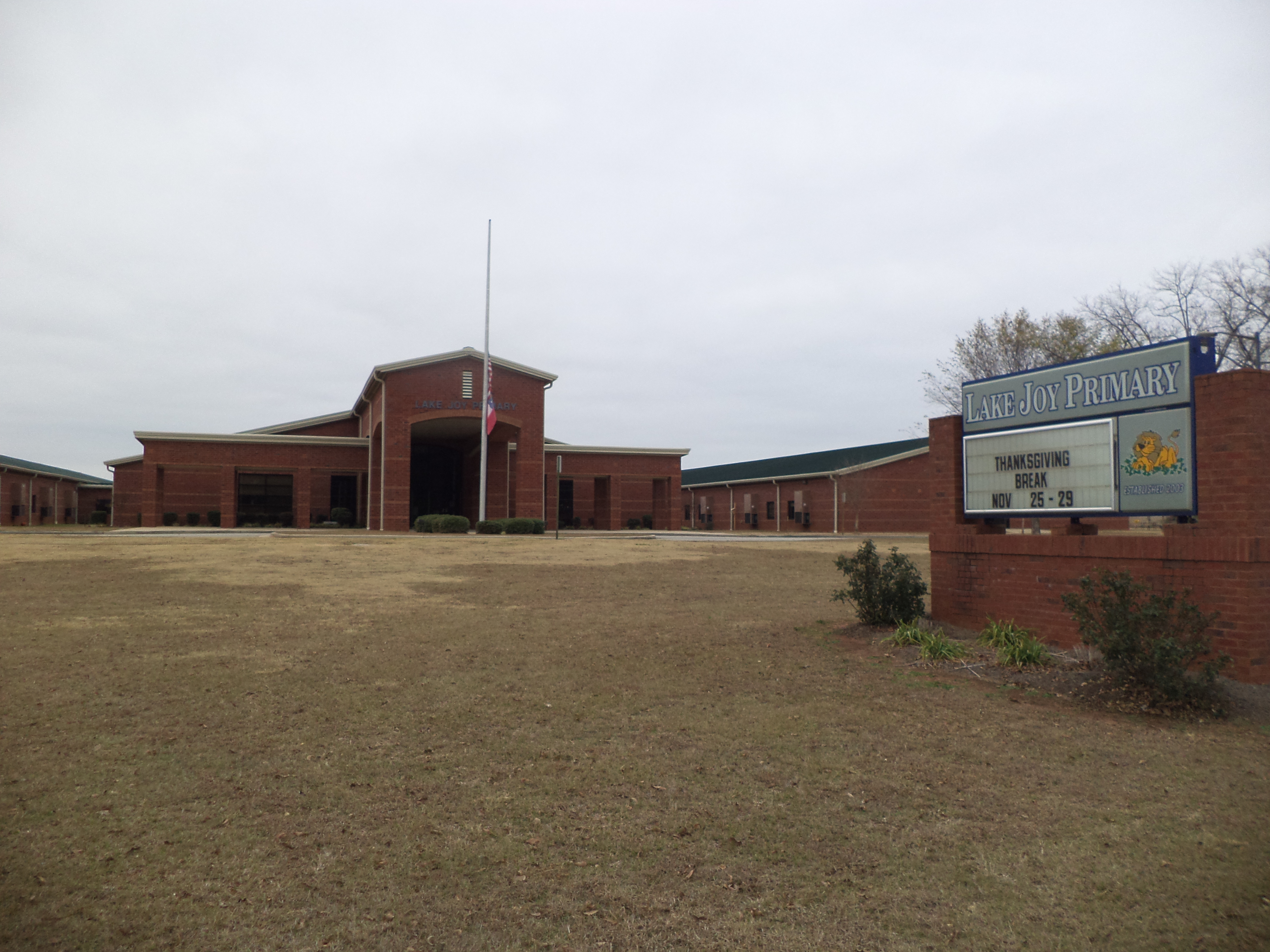
Lake Joy Primary School

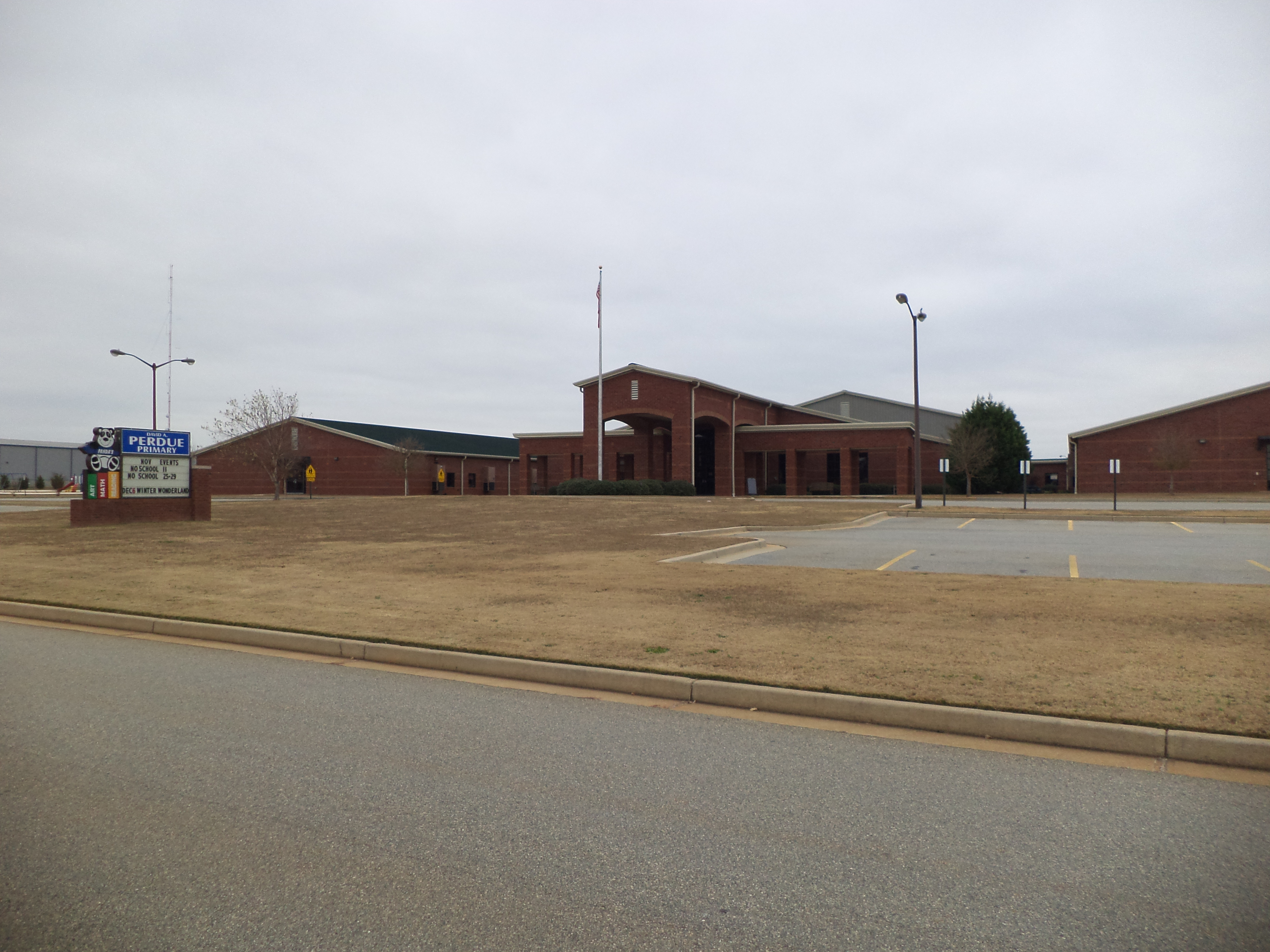
Perdue Primary School
