= Trey Hill =

American football player (born 2000)

Profile
- Position: Center

Personal information
- Born: January 23, 2000 (age 26); Warner Robins, Georgia, U.S.
- Listed height: 6 ft 4 in (1.93 m)
- Listed weight: 319 lb (145 kg)

Career information
- High school: Houston County (Warner Robins)
- College: Georgia (2018–2020)
- NFL draft: 2021: 6th round, 190th overall pick

Career history
- Cincinnati Bengals (2021–2024); Green Bay Packers (2025)*; Chicago Bears (2025)*; Tennessee Titans (2026)*; Washington Commanders (2026)*
- * Offseason or practice squad member only

Awards and highlights
- Second-team All-SEC (2019)

Career NFL statistics as of 2025
- Games played: 25
- Games started: 3
- Stats at Pro Football Reference

Deontrey N. Hill (born January 23, 2000) is an American professional football center. Hill played college football for the Georgia Bulldogs and was selected by the Cincinnati Bengals in the sixth round of the 2021 NFL draft. He has also played for several other NFL teams.

== College career ==
Hill was ranked as a four–star recruit by 247Sports.com coming out of high school. He committed to Georgia on December 11, 2017. Hill started all 14 games of his freshman and sophomore seasons and made the All-SEC 2nd team as a sophomore. Hill started in the first 8 games of his Junior season before missing the last three with a knee injury. On January 4, 2021, he announced he would leave the school for the NFL draft.

== Professional career ==
Pre-draft measurables
Height	Weight	Arm length	Hand span	Wingspan	40-yard dash	10-yard split	20-yard split	20-yard shuttle	Three-cone drill	Bench press
6 ft 3 1/2 in (1.92 m)	319 lb (145 kg)	33 5/8 in (0.85 m)	9 3/8 in (0.24 m)	6 ft 8 3/8 in (2.04 m)	5.45 s	1.87 s	3.08 s	4.95 s	8.29 s	17 reps
All values from Pro Day

=== Cincinnati Bengals ===
Hill was selected by the Cincinnati Bengals in the sixth round with the 190th overall pick of the 2021 NFL draft. He signed his four-year rookie contract with Cincinnati on May 17. He appeared in 13 games, of which he started three, as a rookie. He appeared in 11 games in the 2022 season in a special teams role.

Hill returned as the backup center for the 2023 season. He did not record a single snap or game appearance, often being ruled as a healthy inactive.

Hill was waived by the Bengals on August 27, 2024, and re-signed to the practice squad.

=== Green Bay Packers ===
On January 14, 2025, Hill signed a reserve/futures contract with the Green Bay Packers. He was released on August 26 as part of final roster cuts.

=== Chicago Bears ===
On September 26, 2025, Hill signed with the Chicago Bears' practice squad.

=== Tennessee Titans ===
On January 28, 2026, Hill signed a reserve/future contract with the Tennessee Titans. He was waived by the Titans on June 16.

=== Washington Commanders ===
On August 2, 2026, Hill signed with the Washington Commanders. On August 30, he was waived by Washington as a part of final roster cuts before the start of the regular season.
