= Perry High School (Georgia) =

High school in Perry, Georgia, United States

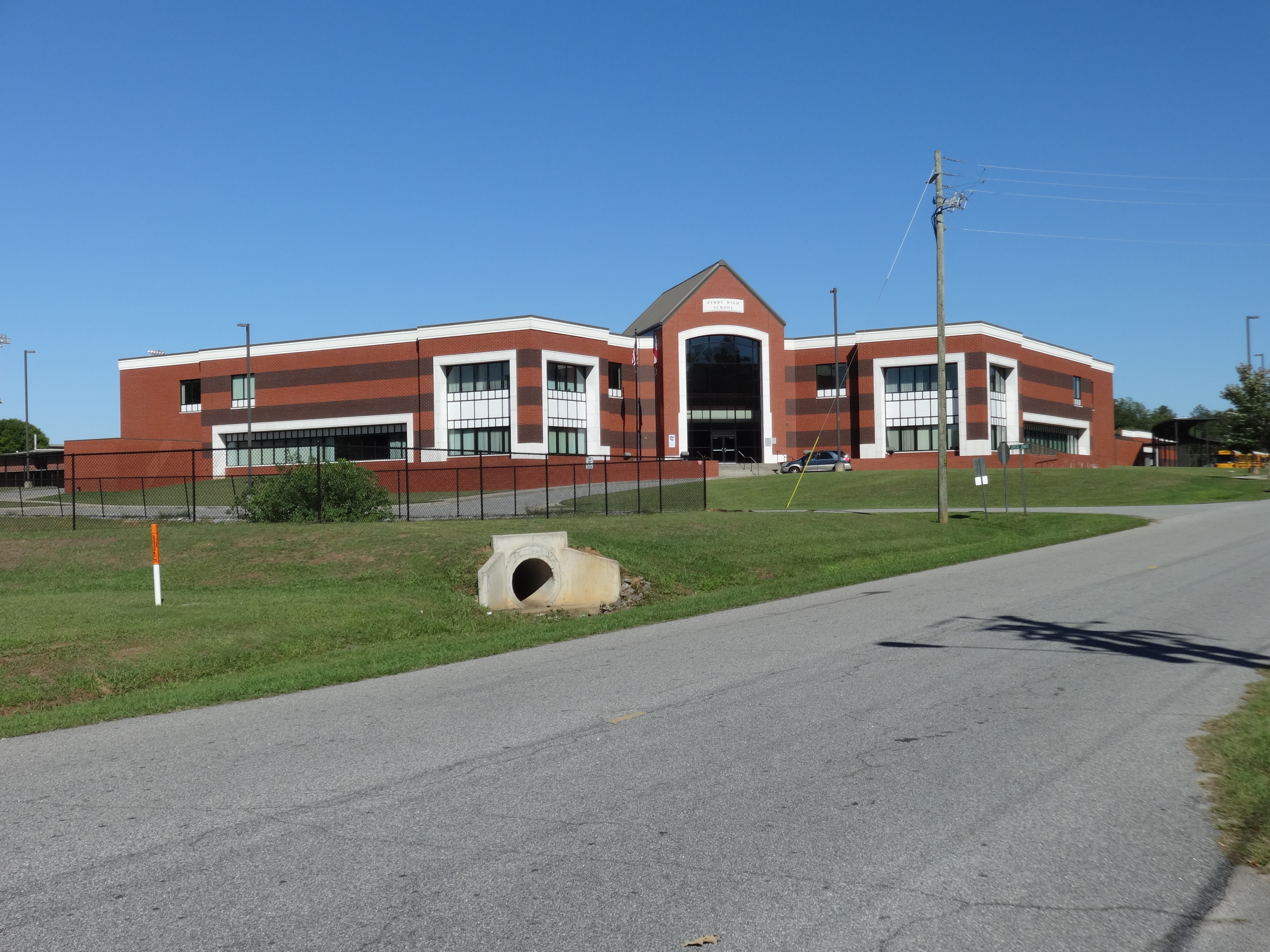

Location
- 1307 North Avenue; Perry, Georgia 31069; United States
- Coordinates: 32°28′04″N 83°43′32″W

Information
- Established: 1956; 70 years ago
- School district: Houston County Schools
- Principal: Arthur Billings
- Staff: 83.40 (FTE)
- Faculty: 120
- Grades: 9–12
- Student to teacher ratio: 18.99
- Colors: Maroon and Gold
- Athletics: AAAA Region 2
- Mascot: Panther
- Website: https://phs.hcbe.net/

Perry High School is a high school in Perry, Georgia, United States. The school serves Perry, Georgia. It is part of the Houston County School District. The two feeder schools are Perry Middle School and Mossy Creek Middle School. The mascot of Perry High School is the Panther. The school's colors are maroon and gold.

== Athletics ==
Perry High school is designated by the Georgia High School Association (GHSA) to be in Region 2 of its 4A classification in accordance with the Association's Reclassification 2024-26.

=== Football ===
2023(4A)

== Alumni ==
- Kanorris Davis - previously New England Patriots safety/linebacker
- Casey Hayward - cornerback free agent in the NFL and philanthropist
- Sam Nunn - United States Senator
- Deborah Roberts - television journalist
- Dontarrious Thomas - football linebacker
- Kiwaukee Thomas - retired NFL cornerback
- Al Thornton - professional basketball player
- Dae'Quan Wright - college football tight end for the Ole Miss Rebels
