= Houston County High School (Georgia) =

Public high school in Warner Robins, Georgia, United States

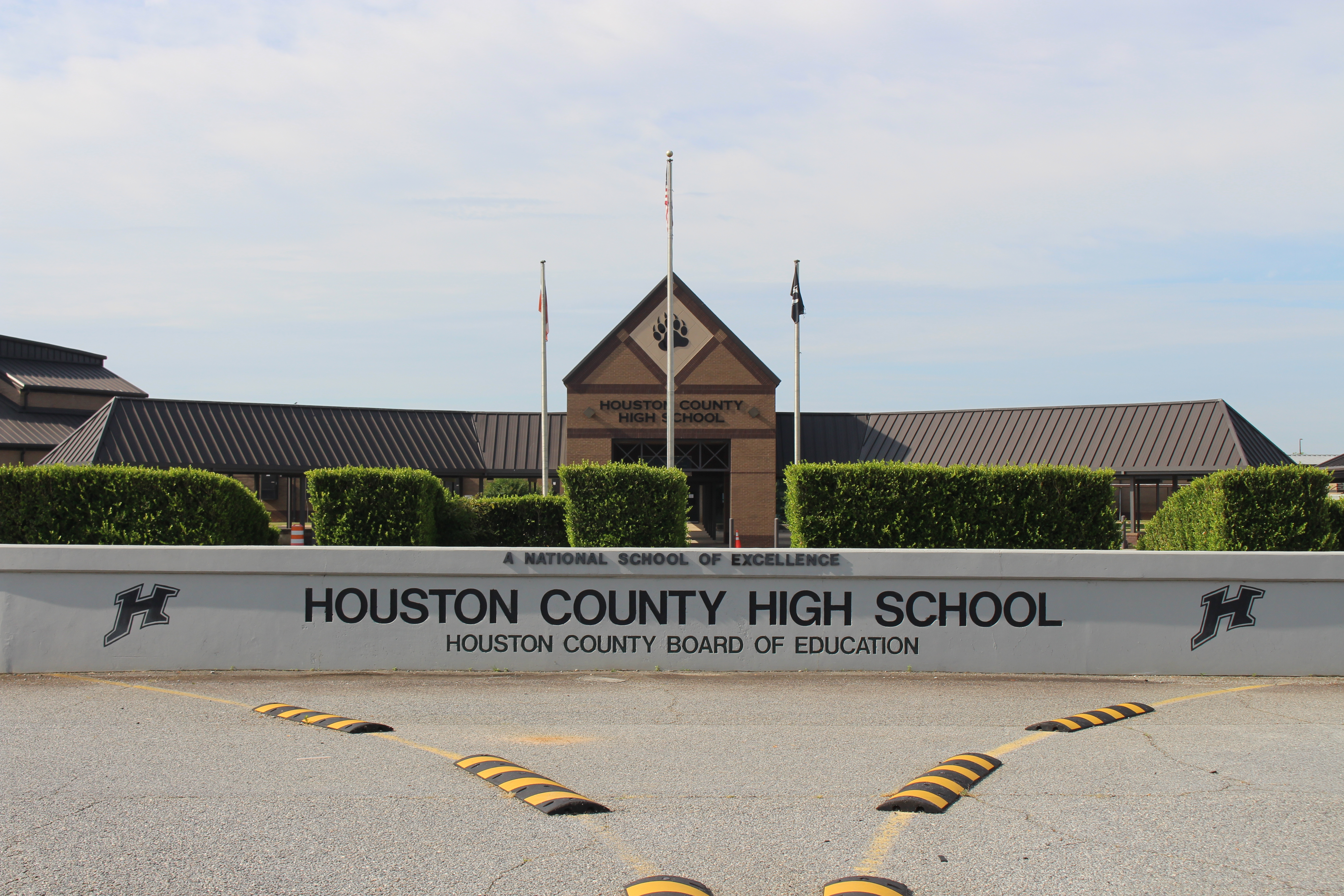

Location
- 920 Highway 96; Warner Robins, Georgia 31088; United States; 32°33′08″N 83°40′29″W

Information
- Type: Public high school
- Motto: Expect Excellence and Bear Down
- Established: 1991; 35 years ago
- School district: Houston County Schools
- Principal: Jay Jones
- Teaching staff: 114.80 (on an FTE basis)
- Grades: 9–12
- Enrollment: 2,116 (2023–2024)
- Student to teacher ratio: 18.43
- Colors: Black, silver, and white
- Athletics: Football, softball, cross country, track, basketball, baseball, wrestling, golf, tennis, soccer, cheerleading, swimming, volleyball, marching band
- Mascot: Bear
- Website: Houston County High School

Houston County High School (also colloquially referred to as HoCo and HCHS) is a public high school for grades 9-12 in the city of Warner Robins, Georgia, United States. It was founded in 1991 and is part of the Houston County Schools.

The school offers volleyball, cheerleading, football, basketball, soccer, baseball, softball, swim, and tennis teams, the Black and Silver Brigade marching band, and an AFJROTC unit: GA-932.

== Awards ==
Houston County High School was honored as a USDOE Blue Ribbon School between 1994 and 1996. The unaffiliated Blue Ribbon Schools of Excellence, Inc. designated Houston County High School as a "Lighthouse School Charter Member" in 2004. In that same year, HCHS was bestowed one of two Intel-Scholastic Schools of Distinction "Best of the Best" awards. In 2025, HCHS was named an AP Honor School in the subcategory of AP Schools of Distinction by the Georgia Department of Education.

== Academics ==
The feeder schools of Houston County High are Feagin Mill Middle School, Mossy Creek Middle School, and, in some cases depending on zoning, Warner Robins Middle School, all of which being part of the Houston County School System.

=== Graduation rates ===
Houston County High school's graduation rate was 95% in 2023–2024.

=== Graduation requirements ===
In accordance with the Houston County School District and the Georgia Department of Education, students must earn 24 credits in specific subject areas in order to be recommended by the Board for graduation. (Note: Though the Georgia Department of Education only requires 23 credits be earned in order to graduate statewide, each district can choose to impose more rigorous course requirements on an individual basis. In this case, HCBoE requires 5 elective credits as opposed to GADoE's 4. />)

Course type	Credits needed
English/Language Arts	4 units
Math	4 units
Science	4 units
Social Studies	3 units
Personal Fitness	1/2 unit
Health	1/2 unit
CTAE/Fine Arts/Foreign Language	3 units
Electives	5 units

Since its opening, HCHS has held all of its graduation ceremonies at Reaves Arena located inside the Georgia National Fairgrounds along with the rest of the high schools in Houston County.

=== College courses ===
The school also offers on and off-campus Dual Enrollment classes with multiple local colleges for the students to earn college credits. The majority of dual-enrolled students attend Central Georgia Technical College due to its location, being only 1,000 yards from the campus. Students can also take courses with the Georgia Military College and Middle Georgia State University. All on-campus Dual-Enrollment courses are offered through CGTC. The school hosts a large catalog of Advanced Placement courses as well. Most students will take an AP course during their time at the school, and the school boasts strong scores on the AP exams as well. The AP courses currently offered by HCHS are AP Art and Design, AP Biology, AP Calculus AB, AP Calculus BC, AP Chemistry, AP Computer Science A, AP Computer Science Principles, AP English Language, AP English Literature, AP Environmental Science, AP Physics B, AP Precalculus, AP Psychology, AP Spanish, AP Statistics, AP U.S. History, AP World History, and formerly AP Government and Politics.

== Athletics ==
In the 2019-2020 school year the school was identified by the GHSA as part of Region 1 of the 6A Classification of the Georgia High School Association (GHSA).

During the 2023-2024 school year, the school successfully appealed to the GHSA to be moved out of the 6A classification. As of the 2024-2025 school year, Houston County High School participates in Region 2 of the 5A GHSA classification.

=== Baseball ===
In 2014 and 2016 the Bears won the GHSA 5A State title. In 2021 the Bears beat Lassiter High School for the GHSA 6A State Championship.

=== Cheerleading ===
Houston County High School Cheerleading is an athletic program in which the squads compete in state competitions year round. In 2012, the varsity team had an undefeated season and went on to become the 2012 5A State Cheerleading Champions.

In 2022, the Houston County High School Varsity Cheerleading team took the GHSA 6A State Cheerleading Championship title, with the event being held at the Macon Coliseum.

The cheerleading squad frequently competes in Houston County High's state of the art competition gym, of which construction was completed in 2022, and sports usage began during the 2023-24 school year. Usage for the school's basketball program began during the corresponding season in the same year.

One Act Play

Houston County High never won a one-act region title until 2019. Under the direction of Brett Taylor, HCHS has won the Georgia Theatre Conference one act play consecutively from 2019 to 2025 and has earned seven region one-act titles and four state championships during Taylor’s ten years at HCHS.

=== State titles ===
- Baseball (4) - 2014(5A), 2016(5A), 2021(6A), 2023(6A)
- Cheerleading (2) - 2012(5A), 2022(6A)
- Slow Pitch Softball (1) - 1995(2A)

=== Other GHSA state titles ===
- Literary (3) - 1993(2A), 2023(6A), 2024(6A)
- One Act Play (4) - 2021(6A), 2023(6A), 2024(5A), 2025(5A)

== Notable alumni ==
- Drew Burress, college baseball outfielder for the Georgia Tech Yellow Jackets
- Jake Fromm, former UGA and NFL quarterback, and star of Netflix series QB1.
- Travis Greene, Billboard and Stellar Award winning gospel artist. 2001 alumni
- D. L. Hall, 21st overall pick in 2017 Major League Baseball draft; selected by the Baltimore Orioles
- AJ Hill, college football quarterback for the Memphis Tigers
- Trey Hill, NFL player for the Chicago Bears
- Brandon King, NFL football player with the Indianapolis Colts
- Kyle Moore, football player with the NFL's Tampa Bay Buccaneers and Buffalo Bills, and with the Canadian Football League's Toronto Argonauts
- Lizz Wright (nee Elizabeth Wright), Jazz and Gospel singer with 7 studio albums
