= 2014 Poinsettia Bowl =

2014 San Diego County Credit Union Poinsettia Bowl
Navy Midshipmen	San Diego State Aztecs
(7–5)	(7–5)
Independent	Mountain West
17	16
Head coach: Ken Niumatalolo	Head coach: Rocky Long
	1	2	3	4	Total
Navy	7	0	7	3	17
San Diego State	10	3	3	0	16
- Date: December 23, 2014
- Season: 2014
- Stadium: Qualcomm Stadium
- Location: San Diego, California
- MVP: Offensive: Navy QB Keenan Reynolds; Defensive: Navy LB Jordan Drake
- Favorite: San Diego St. by 3.5
- National anthem: Katriz Trinidad
- Referee: Jeff Maconaghy (MAC)
- Attendance: 33,077
- Payout: US$612,500 per team

United States TV coverage
- Network: ESPN/ESPN Radio
- Announcers: Tom Hart, Mike Bellotti, & Heather Mitts (ESPN); Bill Rosinski, David Norrie, & Joe Schad (ESPN Radio)

The 2014 Poinsettia Bowl was post-season American college football bowl game held on December 23, 2014, at Qualcomm Stadium in San Diego, California. The tenth edition of the Poinsettia Bowl pitted the Navy Midshipmen against the San Diego State Aztecs of the Mountain West Conference. The game began at 6:30 p.m. PST and aired on ESPN. It was one of the 2014–15 bowl games that conclude the 2014 FBS football season. The game was sponsored by the San Diego County Credit Union and is officially known was the San Diego County Credit Union Poinsettia Bowl.

The Midshipmen accepted their invitation after earning a 7–5 record in their first 12 games of the season. The Aztecs had a record of 7–5. Navy won the game by a score of 17–16.

== Teams ==
The game featured the Navy Midshipmen against the San Diego State Aztecs of the Mountain West Conference.

This was the fourth overall meeting between these two teams, with San Diego State leading the series 3–0. It will be a rematch of the 2010 Poinsettia Bowl, which saw the Aztecs defeat the Midshipmen by a score of 35–14.

=== Navy Midshipmen ===
On May 6, 2014, organizers announced that they had reached a deal with Navy to play in the Poinsettia Bowl in 2014. After defeating the South Alabama Jaguars for their sixth win of the season on November 28, bowl director Bruce Binkowski extended an invitation to play in the game.

This was Navy's fourth Poinsettia Bowl, giving them the most appearances in the game's history. In addition to the aforementioned 2010 game, the Midshipmen also appeared in the inaugural 2005 game where they defeated Colorado State 51–30 as well as the 2007 game where they lost to Utah 35–32. It will also be the Midshipmen's final game as an FBS Independent team before they join the American Athletic Conference as a football-only member for the 2015 season.

After the game, Navy became the third team to win a bowl game for the 2014 season after trailing in the 4th quarter. The Midshipmen entered the night 0–5 after trailing in the 4th quarter this season and hadn't won such a game since November 22, 2013 at San Jose State. It marked the Midshipmen's 2nd straight bowl game win; second time in school history (2004 and 2005 seasons), making it they're 4th consecutive win this season.

=== San Diego State Aztecs ===
After finishing the regular season with a 7–5 record, the Aztecs accepted their invitation to play in the game.

This was San Diego State's third Poinsettia Bowl; in addition to the aforementioned 2010 game, they also appeared in the 2012 game, losing to the BYU Cougars by a score of 23–6.

== Players of the Game ==
After the game coverage officially ended, it was announced on ESPN that Navy Midshipmen fullback, Chris Swain, #37 was chosen as the 2014 Poinsettia Bowl's "player of the game" with a team leading 8 rushes for 72 yards.

Poinsettia Bowl game trophies were awarded after the game: the "most valuable defensive player of the game" went to senior linebacker Jordan Drake, #13. The "most valuable offensive player of the game" was awarded to junior quarterback Keenan Reynolds, #19 who was 3 for 7 passing for 17 yards and 19 yards rushing with 2 touchdowns.

== Game summary ==
=== Scoring summary ===
Scoring summary

Quarter	Time	Drive			Team	Scoring information	Score	
Quarter	Time	Plays	Yards	TOP	Team	Scoring information	NAVY	SDSU
1	7:35	10	42	4:28	NAVY	Keenan Reynolds 1-yard touchdown run, Austin Grebe kick good	7	0
1	5:35	5	39	2:00	SDSU	Donnel Pumphrey 5-yard touchdown run, Donny Hageman kick good	7	7
1	2:51	4	3	1:58	SDSU	43-yard field goal by Hageman	7	10
2	6:34	10	68	4:57	SDSU	37-yard field goal by Hageman	7	13
3	8:28	13	92	6:23	NAVY	Reynolds 6-yard touchdown run, Grebe kick good	14	13
3	4:16	4	5	1:54	SDSU	37-yard field goal by Hageman	14	16
4	1:27	10	47	4:27	NAVY	24-yard field goal by Grebe	17	16
"TOP" = time of possession. For other American football terms, see Glossary of American football.							17	16

=== Statistics ===
Statistics	NAVY	SDSU
First downs	14	18
Plays–yards	65–271	60–327
Rushes–yards	58–254	33–186
Passing yards	17	141
Passing: Comp–Att–Int	3–7–0	11–27–2
Time of possession	30:27	29:33
