= 2007 Navy vs. North Texas football game =

- Non-conference game
Navy Midshipmen	North Texas Mean Green
(5–4)	(1–7)
74	62
Head coach: Paul Johnson	Head coach: Todd Dodge
	1	2	3	4	Total
Navy	10	35	20	9	74
North Texas	21	28	7	6	62
- Date: November 10, 2007
- Season: 2007
- Stadium: Fouts Field
- Location: Denton, Texas
- National anthem: Green Brigade Marching Band
- Referee: Brad Allen
- Attendance: 26,012

The 2007 Navy vs. North Texas football game was a regular-season college football game between the Navy Midshipmen and the North Texas Mean Green, played on November 10, 2007, at Fouts Field in Denton, Texas. The game held the record for the most combined points scored in a National Collegiate Athletic Association (NCAA) Division I Football Bowl Subdivision (FBS) regulation game with 136 total points, until 137 combined points were scored by Syracuse and Pittsburgh during their November 26, 2016 matchup.

The mid-season, non-conference game was the first meeting between the two teams; both came into the game with highly rated offenses and poorly rated defenses. Before the game the Midshipmen had a 5–4 record, most recently defeating the Notre Dame Fighting Irish to break a streak of 43 consecutive losses to that team. Another win would qualify them for a bowl game. The Mean Green held a 1–7 record, and could not become bowl eligible by winning its remaining games, but the team's offense had improved over the course of the season.

During the first quarter of the game, the Mean Green led the Midshipmen by as much as 18 points. In the second quarter the teams combined to score 63 points, setting records for most points scored in a quarter and a half. The Midshipmen rallied around a strong rushing offense to take the lead at the beginning of the third quarter, and the Mean Green's offensive momentum sputtered during the second half. Navy held the lead for the remainder of the game.

With the win the Midshipmen improved to 6–4, making the team bowl-eligible for the fifth straight year. After finishing the regular season with a record of 8–4 they played in the 2007 Poinsettia Bowl, losing to the Utah Utes. The loss against Navy gave the Mean Green a 1–8 record, and the team eventually finished with a 2–10 record for the season.

== Pre-game buildup ==
=== Navy ===
The Midshipmen, using a triple option offensive scheme under head coach Paul Johnson, had gained the most rushing yards of any team in the nation and had a record of 4–4 through the first eight games of the season. In their ninth game the team defeated the Notre Dame Fighting Irish in triple overtime, ending a 43-year losing streak in the Notre Dame–Navy rivalry and improving the team's record to 5–4. With three games remaining in the season, Navy needed to win at least one more to become bowl eligible. Sponsors had arranged for Navy (which was unaffiliated with any college football conference) to play in the Poinsettia Bowl if they won six games. The Midshipmen defense allowed an average of 38.8 points per game.

=== North Texas ===
Using a spread offense scheme implemented by first-year head coach Todd Dodge, the Mean Green experienced some offensive success; however, defensive woes led to a 1–7 record through the first eight games of the season. In a rivalry game against SMU on September 8 Mean Green quarterback Daniel Meager threw for over 600 yards (one of the top 20 single-game performances in FBS history), but defensive errors and an interception returned for a touchdown during the fourth quarter led to another loss. After losing to the Arkansas Razorbacks 66–7, Dodge replaced Meager with redshirt freshman Giovanni Vizza. After four games as a starter, Vizza had set a new passing record for freshmen at North Texas. Coming into the game, the Mean Green ranked 12th nationally in passing offense. Dodge's defensive squad, however, continued to struggle; the team had allowed an average of 209 yards of rushing per game, ranking 107th in the nation in rushing defense. It also ranked 119th in scoring defense, allowing opponents to score an average of 46.5 points per game. Coming off a bye week, the team entered the game with a 1–7 record.

== Game summary ==
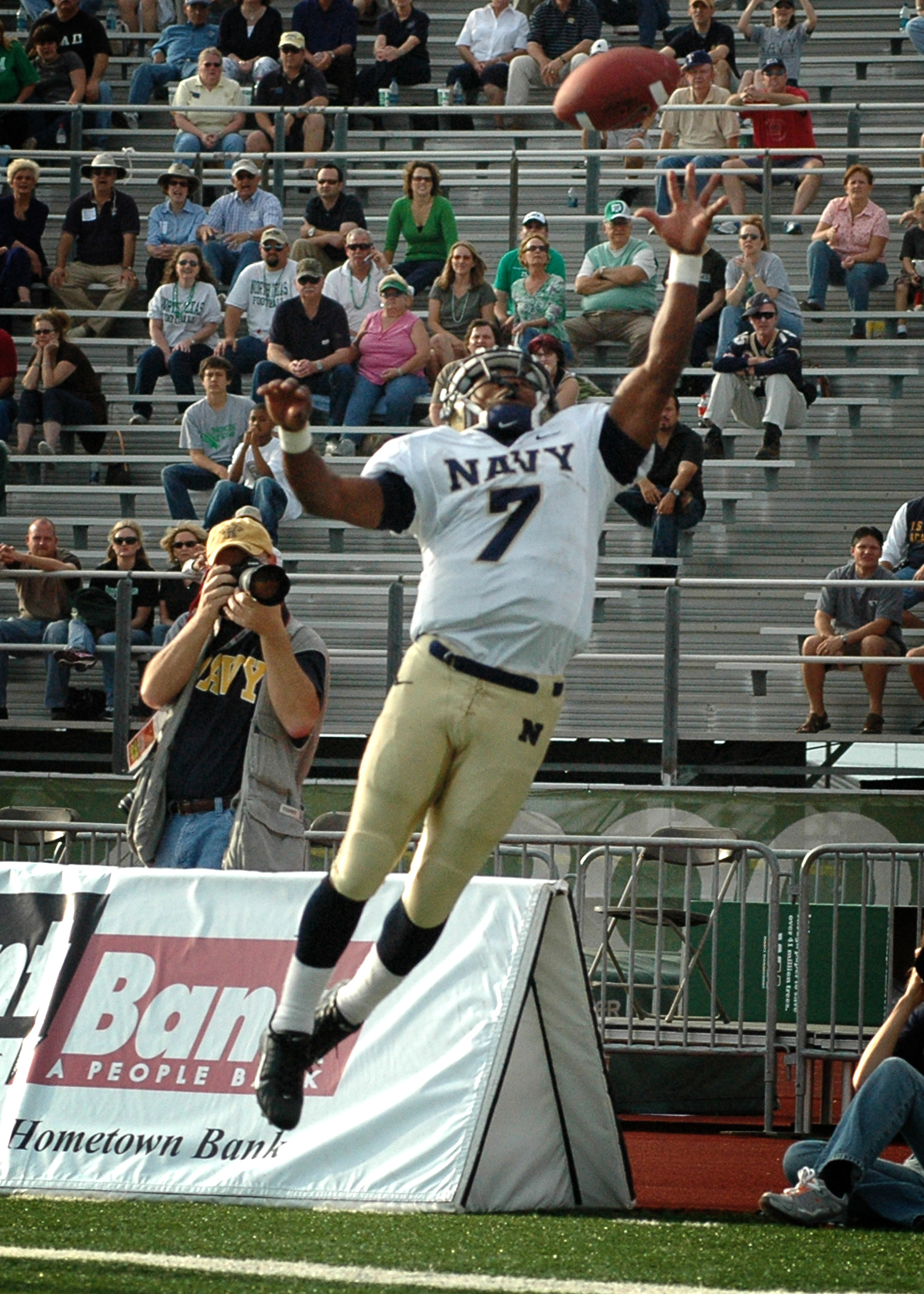
Navy Midshipmen running back Reggie Campbell reaches for a pass (one of only seven thrown by the Midshipmen that day).

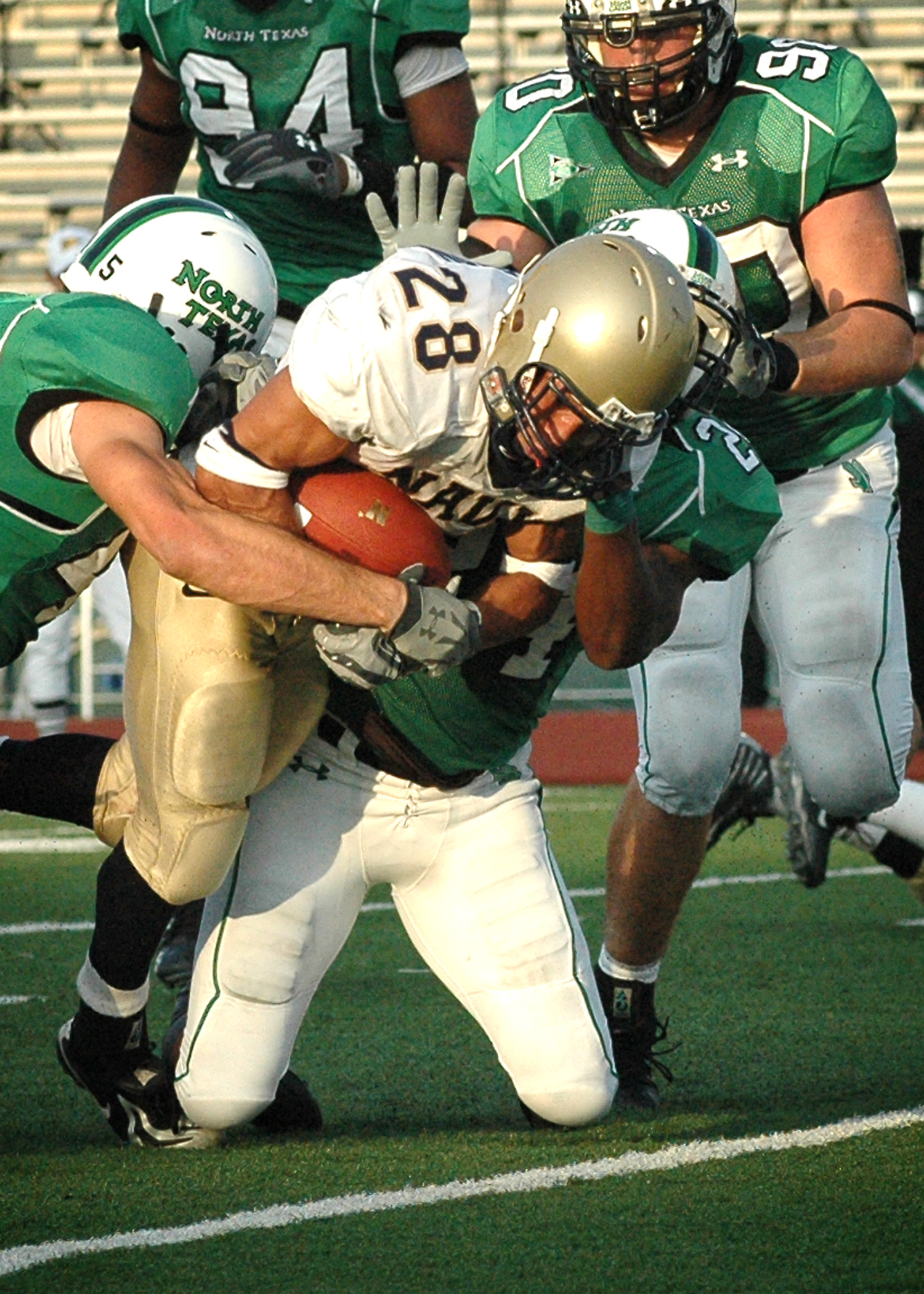
Navy running back Zerbin Singleton ran for three touchdowns in the game.

The game was scheduled to begin at 3 p.m. Central Time at Fouts Field in Denton, Texas. Before the opening kickoff, the Green Brigade Marching Band performed "My Country, 'Tis of Thee" and "The Star-Spangled Banner". At the conclusion of the national anthem, four United States Navy F/A-18 Hornet aircraft performed a flyover past the stadium.

=== First quarter ===
Although the Mean Green had not scored on its first possession in its previous eight games, the team scored on its opening drive against the Midshipmen when wide receiver Casey Fitzgerald caught a nine-yard touchdown pass from quarterback Giovanni Vizza. The Mean Green recovered an onside kick on the ensuing kickoff and scored another touchdown on the following drive. After the Midshipmen kicked a field goal on their first possession, North Texas added another touchdown, giving them a 21–3 lead. Navy scored a touchdown with seven seconds remaining in the quarter. The period ended with the Mean Green ahead, 21–10.

=== Second quarter ===
After Navy forced North Texas to begin the second quarter with a punt, Midshipmen running back Eric Kettani fumbled the ball on the second play of the next drive and the Mean Green recovered. The next eight possessions – four from each team – resulted in touchdowns. Four of the drives took less than a minute of game time to reach the end zone, and a fifth took barely over a minute. In the final two minutes of the half the Midshipmen forced the Mean Green to punt after three plays, and Navy quarterback Kaipo-Noa Kaheaku-Enhada threw a 47-yard pass to running back Reggie Campbell. The Midshipmen ran for another touchdown on the next play. North Texas got the ball back with seven seconds left in the half, but chose not to attempt to score again. At the end of the first half, the Mean Green led the Midshipmen 49–45.

=== Third quarter ===
Navy began the third quarter with a 9-play, 60-yard touchdown drive composed completely of runs. This gave them their first lead of the game at 51–49 (the extra point attempt was blocked). On the next North Texas drive, Midshipmen outside linebacker Ram Vela intercepted Giovanni Vizza's pass at the Midshipmen 20-yard line. Three plays later, Navy running back Zerbin Singleton ran 65 yards for another touchdown, making the score 58–49. The Mean Green responded with a 7-play, 59-yard drive, which ended with another Vizza touchdown pass to Casey Fitzgerald. On the next play from scrimmage, Kettani ran 49 yards. Two plays later he ran for another touchdown, bringing the score to 65–56 at the end of the third quarter.

=== Fourth quarter ===
The next Mean Green drive ended in another interception, this time by Midshipmen linebacker Matt Wimsatt. After the ensuing drive stalled at midfield, the Midshipmen downed a punt at the North Texas two-yard line. Two plays later the Mean Green were called for holding in the end zone, giving Navy a safety. Campbell returned the ensuing free kick for a touchdown, giving the Midshipmen a 74–56 lead. Running back Micah Mosley scored another touchdown for the Mean Green, but their two-point conversion attempt failed, leaving them down 74–62. The Mean Green attempted another onside kick, but Navy recovered. One first down was enough to enable the Midshipmen to run out the clock for the win.

=== Scoring summary ===
Scoring summary

Quarter	Time	Drive			Team	Scoring information	Score	
Quarter	Time	Plays	Yards	TOP	Team	Scoring information	Navy	UNT
1	09:45	13	77	5:15	UNT	Casey Fitzgerald 9-yard touchdown reception from Giovanni Vizza, Moreland kick good	0	7
1	09:45	5	59	2:37	UNT	Washington 36-yard touchdown reception from Giovanni Vizza, Moreland kick good	0	14
1	4:01	9	60	3:03	Navy	22-yard field goal by Joey Bullen	3	14
1	:46	8	79	3:09	UNT	Casey Fitzgerald 9-yard touchdown reception from Giovanni Vizza, Moreland kick good	3	21
1	:32	1	41	:07	Navy	Tyree Barnes 9-yard touchdown reception from Kaipo-Noa Kaheaku-Enhada, Joey Bullen kick good	10	21
2	12:54	1	25	:06	UNT	Casey Fitzgerald 25-yard touchdown reception from Giovanni Vizza, Moreland kick good	10	28
2	10:26	7	80	2:28	Navy	Adam Ballard 12-yard touchdown run, Joey Bullen kick good	17	28
2	9:40	2	60	:41	UNT	Washington 60-yard touchdown reception from Giovanni Vizza, Moreland kick good	17	35
2	9:05	2	78	:30	Navy	Adam Ballard 64-yard touchdown run, Joey Bullen kick good	24	35
2	8:18	2	39	:47	UNT	Casey Fitzgerald 29-yard touchdown reception from Giovanni Vizza, Moreland kick good	24	42
2	5:18	7	57	2:52	Navy	Zerbin Singleton 3-yard touchdown run, Joey Bullen kick good	31	42
2	4:12	2	70	1:01	UNT	Sam Dibrell 75-yard touchdown reception from Giovanni Vizza, Moreland kick good	31	49
2	1:16	7	68	2:51	Navy	Reggie Campbell 21-yard touchdown run, Joey Bullen kick no good (blocked)	38	49
2	:13	2	50	:11	Navy	Zerbin Singleton 3-yard touchdown run, Joey Bullen kick good	45	49
3	10:27	9	60	4:33	Navy	Jarod Bryant 6-yard touchdown run, Joey Bullen kick no good	51	49
3	7:08	3	80	1:08	Navy	Zerbin Singleton 65-yard touchdown run, Joey Bullen kick good	58	49
3	3:39	7	59	3:22	UNT	Casey Fitzgerald 17-yard touchdown reception from Giovanni Vizza, Moreland kick good	58	56
3	2:30	3	64	1:02	Navy	Eric Kettani 12-yard touchdown run, Joey Bullen kick good	65	56
4	8:16				Navy	Safety, UNT called for holding in the end zone	67	56
4	8:06		73		Navy	Reggie Campbell 73-yard free kick return for touchdown, Joey Bullen kick good	74	56
4	3:02	12	71	4:59	UNT	Micah Mosley 1-yard touchdown run, 2-point run failed	74	62
"TOP" = time of possession. For other American football terms, see Glossary of American football.							74	62

== Final statistics ==
Statistics	NAVY	UNT
First downs	31	29
Total yards	680	635
Rushing yards	572	157
Passing yards	108	478
Turnovers	1	2
Time of possession	26:31	33:29

Team	Category	Player	Statistics
Navy	Passing	Kaipo-NoaKaheaku-Enhada	4/5, 108 yards, TD
Navy	Rushing	Shun White	7 rushes, 131 yards, TD
Navy	Receiving	Tyree Barnes	3 receptions, 61 yards, TD
North Texas	Passing	Giovanni Vizza	40/50, 478 yards, 8 TD, 2 INT
North Texas	Rushing	Giovanni Vizza	13 rushes, 93 yards
North Texas	Receiving	Casey Fitzgerald	13 receptions, 134 yards, 5 TD

With a combined 136 total points scored between both teams, the game set an NCAA Division I FBS record for most points scored in a regulation-length game (breaking the previous record of 133 points set when the San Jose State Spartans defeated the Rice Owls 70–63 in 2004). The 63 combined points in the second quarter and 94 points scored in the first half set NCAA records. The game capped off a monthlong period during which four of the five highest-scoring college football games were played. Giovanni Vizza's eight touchdown passes – equaling the total from his previous four games – set an NCAA record for most touchdown passes by a freshman in a single game. The Midshipmen set a school record by running for 572 yards (with 8 rushing touchdowns) in the game, and tied another school record by scoring at least 30 points for an eighth consecutive game.

== Post-game effects ==
During a post-game press conference Midshipmen head coach Paul Johnson described the game as "bizarre", while defensive coordinator Buddy Green criticized his team's defensive performance: "...it was awful. Awful. Just awful. I can't be any clearer than that." The win guaranteed the Midshipmen a spot in the 2007 Poinsettia Bowl, held in San Diego, California on December 20, 2007; Navy lost the game to the Utah Utes, 35–32. It was the fifth straight bowl game for Navy.

The loss dropped the Mean Green to 1–8, and the team finished the season with a 2–10 record. Mean Green coach Todd Dodge expressed astonishment at a post-game press conference, saying "I have never been a part of a game quite like this." The team finished the season averaging an FBS-worst 45.1 points allowed per game. After the final game of the season, Dodge fired defensive coordinator Ron Mendoza, who was replaced by Gary DeLoach. In the 2008 season the Mean Green would again finish at the bottom of the defensive rankings, allowing an average of 47.6 points per game.

== See also ==
- 1916 Cumberland vs. Georgia Tech football game
- 2001 GMAC Bowl
- 2007 Weber State vs. Portland State football game
- 2012 Baylor vs. West Virginia football game
- 2016 Syracuse vs. Pittsburgh football game
- List of historically significant college football games

== Bibliography ==
- 2011 NCAA Football Records – FBS Records (PDF). National Collegiate Athletic Association. 2011.
