= 2007 Poinsettia Bowl =

2007 San Diego County Credit Union Poinsettia Bowl
Utah Utes	Navy Midshipmen
(8–4)	(8–4)
Mountain West	Independent
35	32
Head coach: Kyle Whittingham	Head coach: Ken Niumatalolo
	1	2	3	4	Total
Utah	0	7	14	14	35
Navy	0	10	7	15	32
- Date: December 20, 2007
- Season: 2007
- Stadium: Qualcomm Stadium
- Location: San Diego, California
- MVP: Brian Johnson (Utah)
- Favorite: Utah by 9
- Referee: Tom McCabe (MAC)
- Halftime show: United States Naval Academy Band; Pride of Utah Marching Band
- Attendance: 39,129
- Payout: US$750,000 per team

United States TV coverage
- Network: ESPN
- Announcers: Rece Davis, Lou Holtz, Mark May, and Rob Stone
- Nielsen ratings: 2.00

The 2007 Poinsettia Bowl was a post-season American college football bowl game between the Navy Midshipmen and the Utah Utes played on December 20, 2007, at Qualcomm Stadium in San Diego, California. Utah defeated Navy 35–32 in a game that came down to the final seconds. The third edition of the Poinsettia Bowl was the first of 32 games in the 2007–2008 bowl season and the final game of the 2007 NCAA football season for both teams.

Coming into the game, both teams had win–loss records of 8–4. After beginning their season with a 4–4 record, the Navy Midshipmen defeated the Notre Dame Fighting Irish in triple overtime and became bowl eligible after defeating the North Texas Mean Green for their sixth win of the season. The Utah Utes began the season with a 1–3 record, but won seven straight games when quarterback Brian Johnson returned from an injury. After finishing with the third best record in the Mountain West Conference, they accepted their invitation to the bowl game.

Both teams' offenses moved the ball down the field effectively during the game's first few drives, but neither team could make it into the end zone, leaving the game scoreless after one quarter. The Utes scored first in the second quarter, and the Midshipmen tied the game at 7–7 on their next drive. Navy added a field goal with 28 seconds left in the half to give the Midshipmen a 10–7 lead at halftime. After the Midshipmen scored another touchdown to increase that lead to 17–7, the Utes scored three unanswered touchdowns to gain a 28–17 lead. The Midshipmen narrowed that lead to three points after scoring another touchdown and two-point conversion, and after a series of defensive battles for both teams, the Utes scored again with 1:27 left in the game. Navy scored another touchdown on its next drive to bring the score to 35–32 and recovered an onside kick to retain possession with less than a minute left in the game. Midshipmen quarterback Kaipo-Noa Kaheaku-Enhada's final pass down field, however, was intercepted, allowing the Utes to run out the remaining seconds and win the game with a final score of 35–32.

The win gave the Utah Utes their sixth straight bowl victory.

== Team Selection ==
The 2007 Poinsettia Bowl, operated by the organizers of the Holiday Bowl, was sponsored by the San Diego County Credit Union. The previous year's game matched the TCU Horned Frogs from the Mountain West Conference against Northern Illinois Huskies from the Mid-American Conference. TCU defeated Northern Illinois with a score of 37–7. In exchange for their participation in the 2007 game, Navy and Utah each received $750,000.

=== Navy ===
Prior to the beginning of the 2007 college football season, Poinsettia Bowl organizers and Navy reached a single-season agreement with the United States Naval Academy for the Midshipmen to play in the 2007 Poinsettia Bowl if the team became bowl eligible by reaching at least six wins. The Midshipmen had previously won the inaugural 2005 Poinsettia Bowl and played in the 2006 Meineke Car Care Bowl. The team earned a 4–4 record through the first eight games of the season, including an overtime loss against the Ball State Cardinals and a double-overtime win against the Pittsburgh Panthers. The team's ninth game versus the Notre Dame Fighting Irish ended with a triple-overtime win for the Midshipmen, their first victory in the Navy–Notre Dame football rivalry in 43 years. With a 5–4 record and needing another win to become bowl eligible, the Midshipmen reached that mark when they defeated the North Texas Mean Green in a contest that set a new NCAA record for most points scored in a regulation-length FBS college football game. The Midshipmen accepted their invitation to play in the 2007 Poinsettia Bowl on November 12.

=== Utah ===
Utah's selection as the other half of the 2007 Poinsettia Bowl matchup came by virtue of its third-place finish in the Mountain West Conference, with which the Poinsettia Bowl had an exclusive agreement. After Utes quarterback Brian Johnson suffered a separated shoulder in the team's season opening loss to the Oregon State Beavers, Utah began the 2007 season with a 1–3 record through the first four games, their sole victory coming against the eleventh-ranked UCLA Bruins. When Johnson returned the following week, the Utes won seven straight games before falling to the BYU Cougars in the annual "Holy War" game to finish the regular season with an 8–4 record. The team accepted its invitation to the game on December 2, 2007. The Utes accepted their invitation to play in the 2007 Poinsettia Bowl on December 2.

== Pre-game buildup ==
=== Navy ===
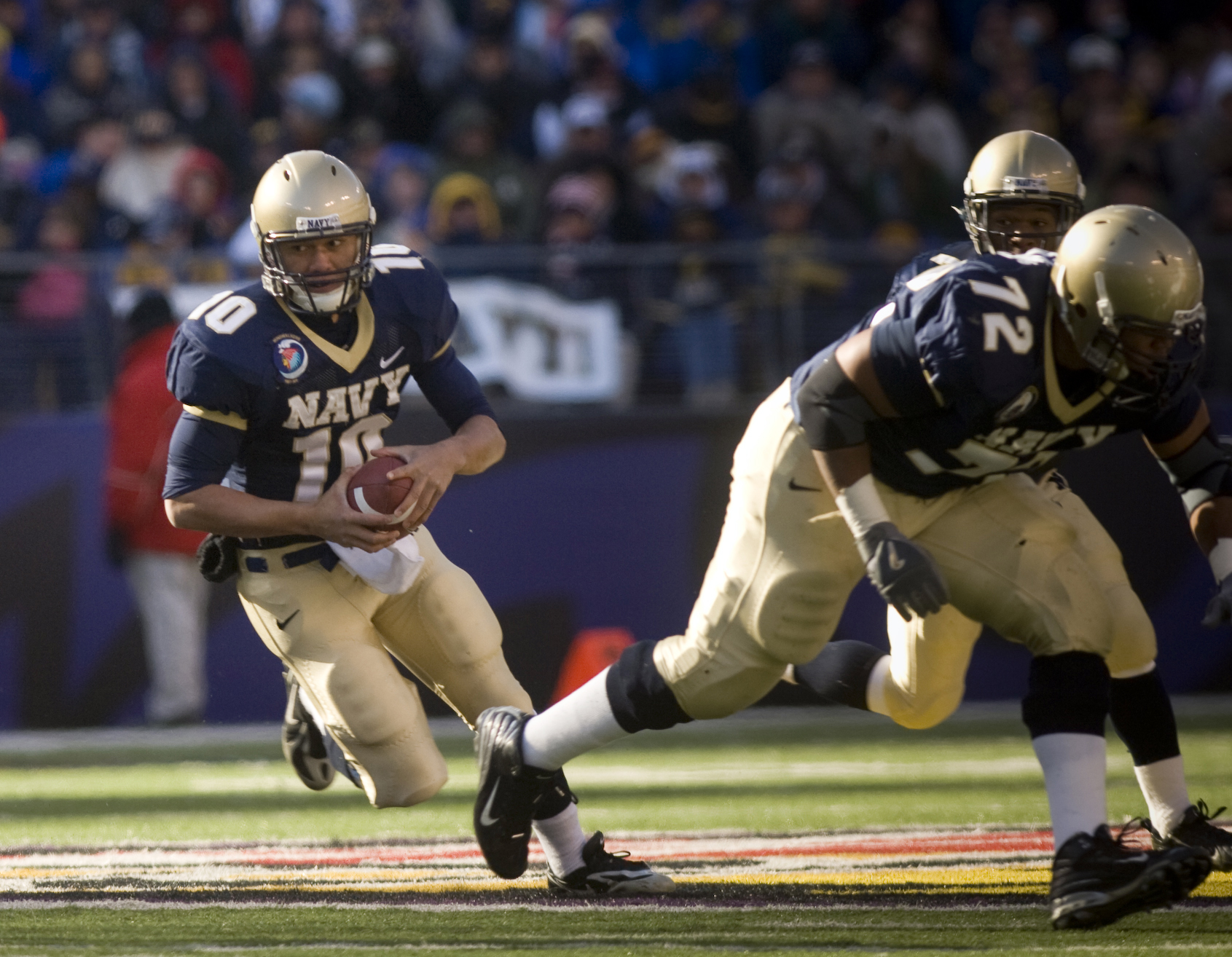
Navy's triple option offense led the nation in rushing yards in 2007.

Prior to the game, Midshipmen head football coach Paul Johnson announced he would take over the head coaching position at Georgia Tech for the 2007 season. Navy's offensive line coach Ken Niumatalolo was initially named interim head coach, but was confirmed as Navy's permanent head coach before the game. The 2007 Poinsettia Bowl was Niumatalolo's first game as head coach at any school.

=== Utah ===
The Utah Utes came into the game having won their last six bowl games. The team ranked fourth in the nation in defense, allowing an average of 130 rushing yards per game.

== Game summary ==
The 2007 Poinsettia Bowl was the first of 32 bowl games scheduled for 2007 college football bowl season. At the conclusion of the national anthem during the pre-game show, four United States Navy F/A-18 Hornet aircraft performed a flyover past the stadium. The 2007 Poinsettia Bowl kicked off on 9:12 pm EST on December 20, 2007, at Qualcomm Stadium in San Diego, California. The game began in fair weather, but by the start of the second half, it had begun to rain. The game was televised in the United States on ESPN, although the first six minutes of game time were broadcast on ESPN Classic rather than ESPN due to a time overrun by another program. The program earned a Nielsen rating of 2.00.

=== First quarter ===
Navy received the ball to begin the game. After starting their first drive on their own 45-yard line, the Midshipmen earned a first down by advancing the ball to the Utah 49-yard line, but were prevented from gaining another first down by the Utah defense. On the ensuing punt, Navy's punter mishandled the snap and fumbled the football. The Utes recovered the fumble, but ran only three plays before Midshipmen linebacker Ross Pospisil intercepted a pass by Utes quarterback Brian Johnson and returned it across the 50-yard line. A facemask penalty against Utah, several effective rushes by Midshipmen running back Reggie Campbell, and a 29-yard reception by Campbell set up a first-and-goal situation. Utah's defense stiffened, however, and Navy failed to score a touchdown on its first two attempts inside the Utah 10-yard line. On the third try, Campbell ran up the middle but fumbled the ball, which Utah recovered.

After recovering the fumble, Utah mounted a 13-play, 49-yard drive that penetrated into Navy territory before it stalled at midfield. Utah was forced to punt the ball away, which rolled into the end zone for a touchback. Taking possession with less than a minute remaining in the first quarter, Navy running back Reggie Campbell ran for 44 yards at the Utes' 36-yard line. Two subsequent rushing plays ran out the first quarter and set the Midshipmen up for a third down to begin the second quarter. At the end of the first quarter, the score remained 0–0.

=== Second quarter ===
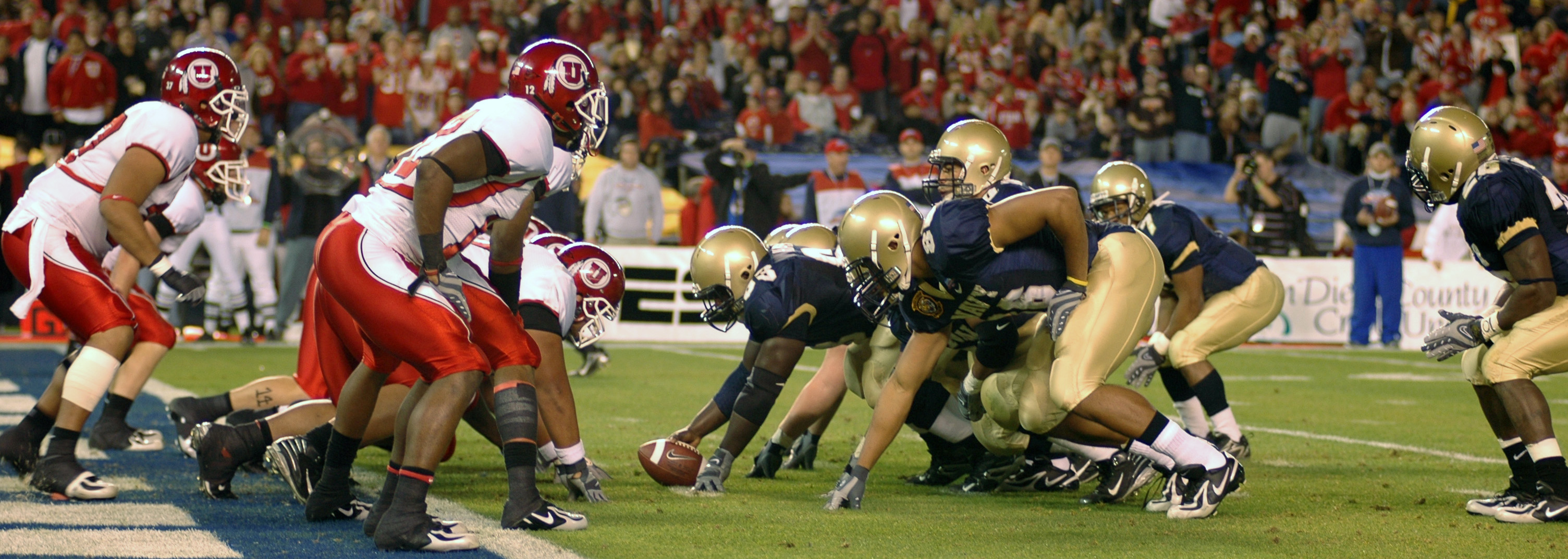
Navy at the line of scrimmage on Utah's goalline

The second quarter began with Navy facing a third down in Utah territory. A false start penalty on the Midshipmen and a Utah defensive stand prevented Navy from earning another first down. On fourth down, Midshipmen kicker Joey Bullen attempted a 50-yard field goal, but missed the goalposts to the left, keeping the game scoreless. Utah began its next drive at its own 33-yard line. The Utes progressed to the Navy 48-yard line before running back Darrell Mack managed a 20-yard run to drive the Utes to the Navy 28-yard line. A 14-yard pass to wide receiver Braden Godfrey put the Utes in Navy's red zone for the first time, and Utah scored the first touchdown of the game on a five-yard run from Mack three plays later. With 8:42 remaining in the second quarter, Utah led 7–0.

Reggie Campbell returned the ensuing kickoff for 25 yards to start Navy at their own 30-yard line. Long runs, A 19-yard run from Shun White and a 15-yard pass interference penalty against the Utes helped advance the ball quickly down the field. On the eighth play of the drive, Midshipmen quarterback Kaipo-Noa Kaheaku-Enhada crossed the goal line from one yard out to tie the score at 7–7 with 5:14 remaining in the first half. On the ensuing drive, Utah was unable to move the ball effectively, and the Utes were forced to punt the ball away. All-American kicker Louie Sakoda's punt traveled 29 yards, setting up the Navy offense at their own 47-yard line with 2:39 remaining before halftime. The Midshipmen converted a fourth down during the drive, but the drive came to a halt following a false start penalty. Kicker Joey Bullen made his second field goal attempt of the game, a 39-yard kick through the uprights to give the Midshipmen a 10–7 lead. With 28 remaining in the first half, Utah received the kickoff and ran a single running play to run out the clock. At halftime, the Midshipmen led the Utes with a score of 10–7.

=== Third quarter ===
Utah began the second half on offense. After a six-yard pass on the first play, Utah failed to gain the additional four yards needed for a first down and were forced to punt the ball away. Beginning at their own 31-yard line, the Midshipmen moved the ball quickly. Two consecutive rushing plays earned Navy a first down, and a 15-yard Shun White run on the third play of the drive brought the team to the Utes' 43-yard line. On the next play, fullback Eric Kettani broke through the Utah defensive line and ran 43 yards for a touchdown, giving Navy a 17–7 lead with 11:52 remaining in the third quarter.

On the first play of Utah's drive, Johnson completed a 22-yard pass to wide receiver Brian Hernandez. Utah's offense faltered, however, and was forced to punt. The ensuing punt from Sakoda was downed at the Midshipmen 8-yard line, and Navy's offense was forced into a three plays-and-out possession. Beginning at their own 41-yard line, Utes quarterback Johnson threw three consecutive completions to bring the drive to the Midshipmen 27-yard line. Just outside the Navy red zone, the Midshipmen defense forced a fourth down for Utah. Utah attempted to convert the fourth down instead of trying a long field goal. The conversion was successful, and on the first down following the conversion, Utah executed an end-around that went for 23 yards and a touchdown. The score cut Navy's lead to three points and put the score at 17–14 with 4:47 remaining in the third quarter.

Though the midshipmen picked up one first down on their next drive, they were forced to punt the ball away with just over two minutes remaining in the quarter. Greg Veteto's punt was downed at the Utes' 16-yard line. The Utes' offense connected on passes of 10, 18, and 11 yards before Johnson completed a 40-yard pass to Derrek Richards for another touchdown. The 1:24 long drive took five plays and covered 84 yards. With the touchdown, Utah regained the lead by a 21–17 score. Midshipmen Campbell ran the opening kickoff return to the Navy 32-yard line, but the team struggled on the next two plays, fumbling and recovering the ball each time. The two failed plays allowed time to run out in the third quarter. At the end of the third quarter, the Utes held a 21–17 lead.

=== Fourth quarter ===
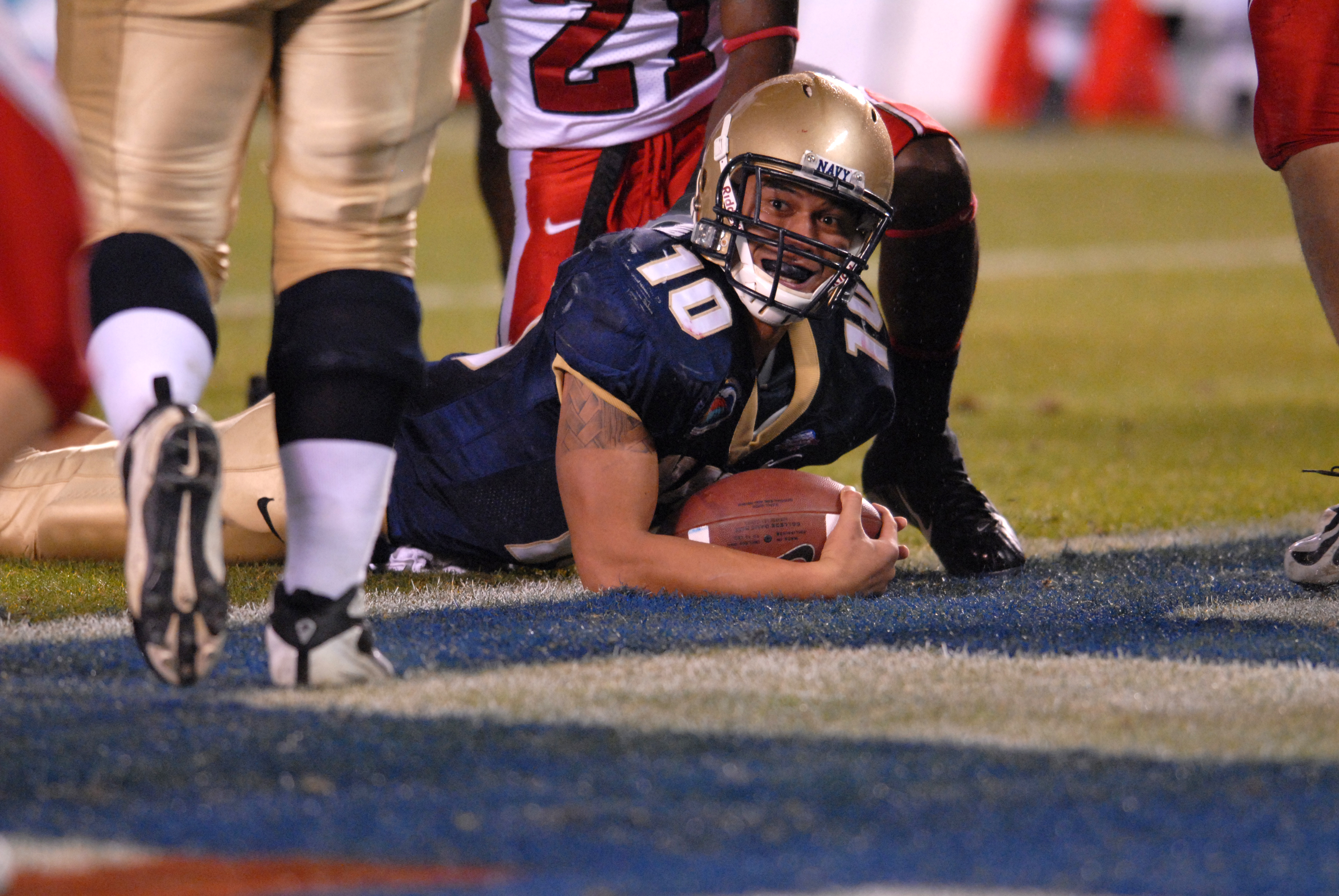
Kaheaku-Enhada gets the two-point conversion

The Midshipmen faced a long third down play to begin the fourth quarter and was forced to punt when quarterback Kaipo-Noa Kaheaku-Enhada was sacked. Over the next five plays and 1:16 of game time, the Utes drove 61 yards ending when quarterback Brian Johnson scored a touchdown on a 19-yard scramble with 12:47 remaining in the game. The score gave Utah a 28–17 lead.

The Midshipmen began their next drive at their own 19-yard line. With several short rushes, Navy began to build a drive. A 14-yard pass by Kaheaku-Enhada brought the team to the Utah 47-yard line. On the next play, fullback Eric Kettani broke free for a 35-yard sprint that put Navy inside the Utah red zone. Two plays later, Shun White rushed 10 yards into the end zone for a touchdown. For a subsequent two-point conversion, Kaheaku-Enhada kept the ball and rushed forward across the goal line. The touchdown and two-point conversion cut Utah's lead to 28–25 with 8:52 remaining.

Utah began its next possession with two quick completions of 11 yards to move the drive to the Midshipmen 49-yard line. Johnson continued to move the ball, picking up yardage through the air and on the ground. As Utah reached Navy territory, however, the Midshipmen's defense stiffened. Inside the 10-yard line, Utah had three tries to cross the goal line and earn a touchdown. On the third play inside the ten, Utah wide receiver Jereme Brooks caught a pass from Brian Johnson. As he extended the ball toward the goal line, he was hit by Navy cornerback Ketric Buffin. Brooks lost control of the ball, which came out of his hands, hitting the pylon at the corner of the end zone. According to NCAA rules, the pylon was both out of bounds and in the end zone. Therefore, the fumble should have been considered a touchback, with Navy awarded possession at its own 20-yard line. Instead, officials ruled that Brooks had been out of bounds before fumbling and Utah maintained possession. After the game, officials acknowledged the mistake. Utah had one more chance to score, but turned the ball over on downs after failing to cross the goal line on a run from inside the 1-yard line.

The Midshipmen began their next drive at their own 1-yard line with 3:40 remaining in the game. Over the next three plays, Navy failed to gain a first down. Facing a fourth-and-two inside its own nine-yard line, Kaheaku-Enhada attempted to rush the ball for the first down, but was stopped by the Utah defense. Navy turned the ball over on downs inside its own 10-yard line, putting Utah in position to put the game away with less than two minutes remaining. Three rushing plays later, Utah's Darrell Mack ran the ball into the end zone for the Utes' fourth touchdown of the second half, giving Utah a 35–25 lead with just 1:27 remaining in the game. The Midshipmen mounted a quick four-play, 69-yard touchdown drive that left 57 seconds on the clock and closed the lead to 35–32. Navy successfully converted the ensuing onside kick. A short rush gained Navy nine yards, but kept the clock moving. On the final play of the drive, Kaheaku-Enhada hurled the ball downfield in hopes of earning a first down, which would stop the clock and move the team to within field goal range. The ball was intercepted by a Utah defender, however, and Utah subsequently ran out the clock to end the game with a score of 35–32.

=== Scoring summary ===
Scoring summary

Quarter	Time	Drive			Team	Scoring information	Score	
Quarter	Time	Plays	Yards	TOP	Team	Scoring information	UTAH	NAVY
2	08:42		67	5:33	UTAH	Darrell Mack 6-yard touchdown run, Louie Sakoda kick good	7	0
2	05:14		70	3:28	NAVY	Kaipo-Noa Kaheaku-Enhada 1-yard touchdown run, Joey Bullen kick good	7	7
2	00:28		31	2:11	NAVY	39-yard field goal by Joey Bullen	7	10
3	11:52		69	1:27	NAVY	Eric Kettani 43-yard touchdown run, Joey Bullen kick good	7	17
3	04:47		59	2:23	UTAH	Jereme Brooks 23-yard touchdown run, Louie Sakoda kick good	14	17
3	01:12		84	1:24	UTAH	Derrek Richards 40-yard touchdown reception from Brian Johnson, Louie Sakoda kick good	21	17
4	12:47		61	1:16	UTAH	Brian Johnson 19-yard touchdown run, Louie Sakoda kick good	28	17
4	08:48		81	3:59	NAVY	Shun White 10-yard touchdown reception from Kaipo-Noa Kaheaku-Enhada, 2-point run good	28	25
4	01:27		9	0:50	UTAH	Darrell Mack 1-yard touchdown run, Louie Sakoda kick good	35	25
4	00:57		68	0:30	NAVY	Zerbin Singleton 58-yard touchdown reception from Kaipo-Noa Kaheaku-Enhada, Joey Bullen kick good	35	32
"TOP" = time of possession. For other American football terms, see Glossary of American football.							35	32

== Final statistics ==
Statistical comparison
	Utah	Navy
1st downs	26	21
Total yards	451	438
Passing yards	238	122
Rushing yards	213	316
Penalties	4–37	4–21
3rd down conversions	7–14	6–16
4th down conversions	1–2	1–3
Turnovers	2	3
Time of Possession	32:34	27:26

Utah Utes quarterback Brian Johnson, who ran for one touchdown and threw for another, was named the game's Most Valuable Player. Johnson's second half performance helped the Utes overcome a ten-point deficit; during the third quarter, he completed all nine of his passes for 120 yards. He eventually completed 20 of 25 passes in the game for 226 yards.

Although the Midshipmen dominated the first quarter statistically, three turnovers prevented the team from scoring during the game's first few drives. Midshipmen fullback Eric Kettani finished the game with 125 yards on 12 carries, averaging 10.4 yards per carry, finishing one yard short of his season-best of 126 yards in a loss to the Ball State Cardinals earlier that year.

Both teams struggled to convert on third and fourth downs, converting 15 out of 34 attempts.

=== Individual leaders ===
Utah
Passing
Player	C/ATT^{*}	Yds	Pct	TD	INT
B. Johnson	20/25	226	80.0	1	1
C. Louks	2/2	12	100.0	0	0
Rushing
Player	Car^{a}	Yds	Ave	TD	LG^{b}
D. Mack	22	76	3.5	2	20
B. Johnson	11	69	6.3	1	19
C. Louks	6	25	4.2	0	11
J. Brooks	2	25	12.5	1	23
R. Stowers	2	8	4.0	0	7
M. Wilson	1	7	7.0	0	7
E. Wesson	1	3	3.0	0	3
Receiving
Player	Rec^{c}	Yds	Ave	TD	LG^{b}
B. Hernandez	5	63	12.6	0	23
D. Richards	4	61	15.3	1	40
F. Brown	3	41	13.7	0	18
D. Mack	4	31	7.8	0	11
J. Brooks	3	14	4.7	0	6
B. Godfrey	1	14	14.0	0	14
E. Wesson	1	10	10.0	0	10
M. Sims	1	5	5.0	0	5

^{*} Completions/Attempts ^{a} Carries ^{b} Long play ^{c} Receptions

Navy
Passing
Player	C/ATT^{*}	Yds	Pct	TD	INT
K. Kaheaku-Enhada	7/14	122	50.0	2	1
Rushing
Player	Car^{a}	Yds	Ave	TD	LG^{b}
E. Kettani	12	125	10.4	1	43
R. Campbell	7	58	8.3	0	44
S. White	9	57	6.3	0	19
K. Kaheaku-Enhada	18	52	2.9	1	14
A. Ballard	6	21	3.5	0	7
T. Barnes	1	8	8.0	0	8
Z. Singleton	3	6	2.0	0	6
J. Bryant	1	1	1.0	0	1
G. Veteto	1	(-)12	(-)12	0	(-)12
Receiving
Player	Rec^{c}	Yds	Ave	TD	LG^{b}
Z. Singleton	2	64	32	1	58
R. Campbell	1	29	29.0	0	29
O. Washington	1	14	14.0	0	14
S. White	1	10	10.0	1	10
A. Ballard	1	9	9.0	0	9
E. Kettani	1	(-)4	(-)4.0	0	(-)4

^{*} Completions/Attempts ^{a} Carries ^{b} Long play ^{c} Receptions

== Post-game effects ==
Utah's win was the seventh-straight bowl win for the Utes, dating back to the 1999 Las Vegas Bowl. Which the Utes won against Fresno State. Setting the program record for most consecutive bowl game wins at that point in time.

The 2007 Poinsettia Bowl was the last time the bowl would feature a matchup between an at-large team and the second-place Mountain West Conference team. Prior to the game, Poinsettia Bowl officials announced that the at-large half of the matchup would be replaced by the Pacific-10 Conference's seventh-place team in 2008. In 2009, the Pac-10's sixth-place team would be granted a bid to the Poinsettia Bowl.
