= Poinsettia Bowl =

College football bowl game

- SDCCU Poinsettia Bowl
- Stadium: Snapdragon Stadium (2026–present); San Diego Stadium (2005–2016)
- Location: San Diego, California
- Operated: 2005–2016; 2026–present
- Conference tie-ins: Pac-12, "Legacy Pac-12" (Big Ten, Big 12, ACC)
- Previous conference tie-ins: Pac-10, WAC, Mountain West
- Website: poinsettiabowl.com

Sponsors
- San Diego County Credit Union (SDCCU) (2005–2016; 2026–present)

Former names
- San Diego County Credit Union Poinsettia Bowl (2005–2016)

2016 matchup
- BYU vs. Wyoming (BYU 24–21)

2026 matchup
- TBD vs.TBD (December 23, 2026)

The Poinsettia Bowl is an annual college football bowl game. The game was first contested in 2005, created by the organizers of the Holiday Bowl. Through 2016, the game was played in late December each year at San Diego Stadium. After a decade-long hiatus, the bowl was revived in 2026 to be contested at Snapdragon Stadium in San Diego. Since inception, the bowl's only sponsor has been San Diego County Credit Union (commonly known as SDCCU), currently branding the game as the SDCCU Poinsettia Bowl.

== History ==
=== 2005–2016 ===
The bowl was contested annually from 2005 through 2016, featuring a team from the Mountain West Conference each year it was played, originally against an at-large opponent.

The inaugural game in 2005 matched Navy Midshipmen against the Colorado State Rams; Navy won, 51–30, in front of an attendance of 36,842. In the week leading up to the 2005 game, the Navy Midshipmen accepted an invitation to the 2008, 2009, or 2010 Poinsettia Bowls if Navy was bowl-eligible in those seasons. That there are several United States Navy bases in and around San Diego contributed to this decision by the Midshipmen, at the time an independent program. Navy went on to play in the 2008 EagleBank Bowl and the 2009 Texas Bowl, then returned for the 2010 Poinsettia Bowl.

Bowl organizers announced that if the Army Black Knights were bowl-eligible at the end of the 2006 regular season, they would receive an automatic berth in the Poinsettia Bowl; however, the 2006 Black Knights wound up with a losing record, and thus were not eligible.

In July 2007, it was announced that, starting with the 2008 game, the Pac-10 Conference would send its seventh-place team to the game, and its sixth-place team in 2009 and 2010, replacing the at-large team in the bowl. The 2007 game matched the Utah Utes against the Navy Midshipmen; Utah won, 35–32. The Midshipment became bowl eligible via Navy's win over North Texas, 74–62, a game that set a new NCAA record for most points scored in a college football game.

It was announced that, starting with the 2008 season and continuing through 2009, if the Pac-10 did not have enough bowl-eligible teams to send one to the Poinsettia Bowl (a contractual obligation), the game's organizers reserved the right to select a team from the Western Athletic Conference (WAC). The 2008 game matched the No. 11 TCU Horned Frogs of the Mountain West Conference against the No. 9 Boise State Broncos, the WAC champion; TCU won, 17–16. Boise State received a berth as the Pac-10 did not have sufficient bowl-eligible teams for this game. The game garnered a 3.74 national television rating on ESPN, the bowl's most watched game ever and the highest rated pre-Christmas game ever on the all-sports network.

Louisiana Tech and TCU received and accepted bids to participate in the 2011 game, which TCU won, 31–24. TCU's participation was somewhat unexpected as they missed out on a third straight Bowl Championship Series (BCS) bowl invitation by a single national rank position, as they finished their regular season ranked 17th in the nation.

=== Hiatus ===
On January 25, 2017, the San Diego Bowl Game Association announced plans to eliminate the Poinsettia Bowl and focus solely on the Holiday Bowl. The Poinsettia Bowl remained on hiatus through 2025.

=== 2026–present ===
In April 2026, if was announced that the bowl would once again be resumed, beginning with the 2026–27 bowl season. While initially seeming that the bowl would pit the Pac-12 champion against the Mountain West champion, it was announced the following month that the revived Poinsettia Bowl would pit the Pac-12 champion against a legacy member from the "old" Pac-12, which after conference realignment included teams dispersed across the Big Ten, Big 12, and ACC. The CW was named the bowl's official broadcast partner.

== Game results ==
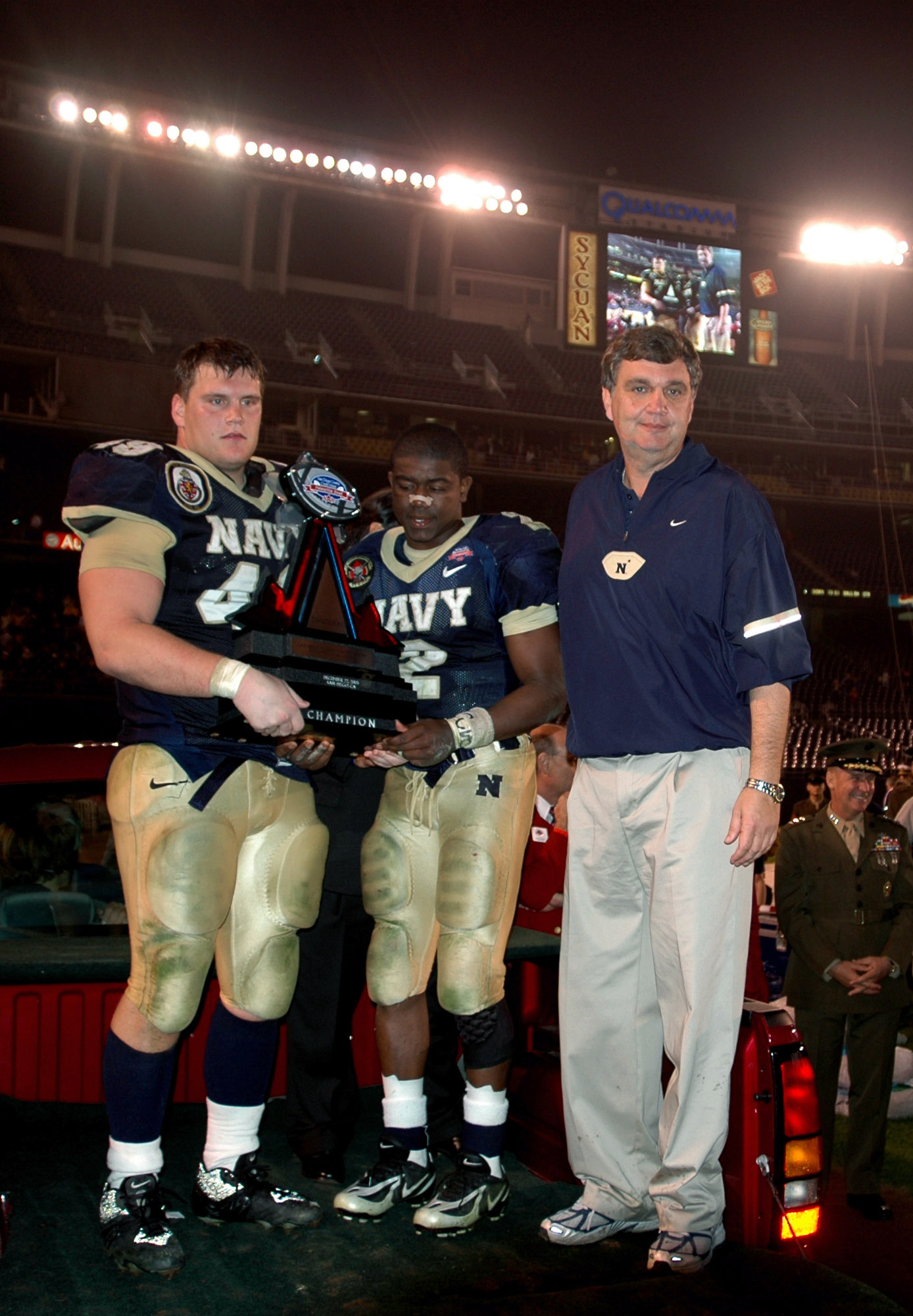
Navy defensive end Jeremy Chase (left), quarterback Lamar Owens (center), and head football coach Paul Johnson receive the trophy after defeating Colorado State 51–30 in the inaugural Poinsettia Bowl

All rankings are taken from the AP poll prior to the game being played.

Date	Winning team		Losing team		Notes
December 22, 2005	Navy	51	Colorado State	30	notes
December 19, 2006	#25 TCU	37	Northern Illinois	7	notes
December 20, 2007	Utah	35	Navy	32	notes
December 23, 2008	#11 TCU	17	#9 Boise State	16	notes
December 23, 2009	#23 Utah	37	California	27	notes
December 23, 2010	San Diego State	35	Navy	14	notes
December 21, 2011	#16 TCU	31	Louisiana Tech	24	notes
December 20, 2012	BYU	23	San Diego State	6	notes
December 26, 2013	Utah State	21	#24 Northern Illinois	14	notes
December 23, 2014	Navy	17	San Diego State	16	notes
December 23, 2015	Boise State	55	Northern Illinois	7	notes
December 21, 2016	BYU	24	Wyoming	21	notes

== MVPs ==
Date played	Offensive MVP			Defensive MVP		
Date played	Player	Team	Pos.	Player	Team	Pos.
December 22, 2005	Reggie Campbell	Navy	RB	Tyler Tidwell	Navy	LB
December 19, 2006	Jeff Ballard	TCU	QB	Tommy Blake	TCU	DE
December 20, 2007	Brian Johnson	Utah	QB	Joe Dale	Utah	DB
December 23, 2008	Andy Dalton	TCU	QB	Stephen Hodge	TCU	S
December 23, 2009	Jordan Wynn	Utah	QB	Stevenson Sylvester	Utah	LB
December 23, 2010	Ronnie Hillman; Vincent Brown	San Diego State	RB; WR	Andrew Preston	San Diego State	DB
December 21, 2011	Skye Dawson	TCU	WR	Greg McCoy	TCU	CB
December 20, 2012	Cody Hoffman	BYU	WR	Kyle Van Noy	BYU	LB
December 26, 2013	Joey DeMartino	Utah State	RB	Jake Doughty	Utah State	LB
December 23, 2014	Keenan Reynolds	Navy	QB	Jordan Drake	Navy	LB
December 23, 2015	Brett Rypien	Boise State	QB	Kamalei Correa	Boise State	DE
December 21, 2016	Jamaal Williams	BYU	RB	Harvey Langi	BYU	LB

== Most appearances ==
Updated through the December 2016 edition (12 games, 24 total appearances).

Rank	Team	Appearances	Record
1	Navy	4	2–2
T2	TCU	3	3–0
T2	San Diego State	3	1–2
T2	Northern Illinois	3	0–3
T5	BYU	2	2–0
T5	Utah	2	2–0
T5	Boise State	2	1–1

Teams with a single appearance

Won (1): Utah State
Lost (4): California, Colorado State, Louisiana Tech, Wyoming

== Records by conference ==
Updated through the December 2016 edition (12 games, 24 total appearances).

Conference	Record				Appearances by season	
Conference	Games	W	L	Win pct.	Won	Lost
Mountain West	12	8	4	.667	2006, 2007, 2008, 2009, 2010, 2011, 2013, 2015	2005, 2012, 2014, 2016
Independent	6	4	2	.667	2005, 2012, 2014, 2016	2007, 2010
Pac-12	1	0	1	.000		2009
WAC	2	0	2	.000		2008, 2011
MAC	3	0	3	.000		2006, 2013, 2015

- The record of the Pac-12 includes appearances when the conference was known as the Pac-10 (before 2011).
- Conferences that are defunct or no longer active in FBS are marked in italics.
- Independent appearances: BYU (2012, 2016), Navy (2005, 2007, 2010, 2014)

== See also ==
- List of college bowl games
