= 2006 Navy Midshipmen football team =

American college football season

2006 Navy Midshipmen football
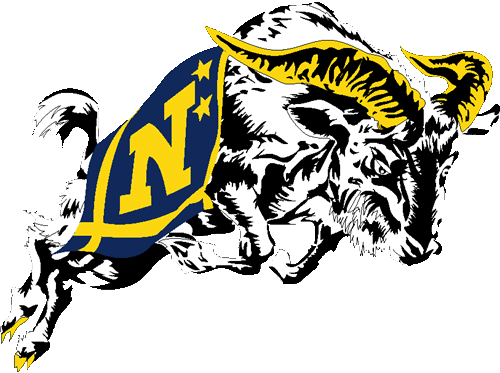

Meineke Car Care Bowl, L 24–25 vs. Boston College
- Conference: Independent
- Record: 9–4
- Head coach: Paul Johnson (5th season)
- Offensive scheme: Triple option
- Defensive coordinator: Buddy Green (5th season)
- Base defense: Multiple
- MVP: David Mahoney
- Captains: James Rossi; Rob Caldwell
- Home stadium: Navy–Marine Corps Memorial Stadium

2006 NCAA Division I FBS independents football records
	Conf.			Overall
Team	W		L	W		L
No. 17 Notre Dame %		–		10	–	3
Navy		–		9	–	4
Army		–		3	–	9
Temple		–		1	–	11
% – BCS at-large representative; Rankings from AP Poll

The 2006 Navy Midshipmen football team represented the United States Naval Academy (USNA) as an independent during the 2006 NCAA Division I FBS football season. The team was led by fifth-year head coach Paul Johnson.

== Schedule ==
Date	Time	Opponent	Site	TV	Result	Attendance	Source
September 2	5:30 p.m.	East Carolina	Navy–Marine Corps Memorial Stadium; Annapolis, MD	CSTV	W 28–23	33,809	
September 9	1:30 p.m.	No. 9 (FCS) UMass	Navy–Marine Corps Memorial Stadium; Annapolis, MD	CSTV	W 21–20	30,117	
September 16	7:00 p.m.	at Stanford	Stanford Stadium; Stanford, CA	FSNBA	W 37–9	44,022	
September 23	1:30 p.m.	Tulsa	Navy–Marine Corps Memorial Stadium; Annapolis, MD	CSTV	L 23–24 ^{OT}	31,604	
September 30	12:00 p.m.	at Connecticut	Rentschler Field; East Hartford, CT	ESPN Plus	W 41–17	40,000	
October 7	12:00 p.m.	at Air Force	Falcon Stadium; Colorado Springs, CO (Commander-in-Chief's Trophy)	CSTV	W 24–17	45,246	
October 14	1:30 p.m.	No. 24 Rutgers	Navy–Marine Corps Memorial Stadium; Annapolis, MD	CSTV	L 0–34	36,918	
October 28	12:00 p.m.	No. 11 Notre Dame	M&T Bank Stadium; Baltimore, MD (rivalry)	CBS	L 14–38	71,851	
November 4	1:00 p.m.	at Duke	Wallace Wade Stadium; Durham, NC		W 38–13	17,782	
November 11	1:00 p.m.	at Eastern Michigan	Ford Field; Detroit, MI	CL	W 49–21	15,816	
November 18	12:30 p.m.	Temple	Navy–Marine Corps Memorial Stadium; Annapolis, MD	CSTV	W 42–6	33,927	
December 2	2:30 p.m.	vs. Army	Lincoln Financial Field; Philadelphia, PA (Army–Navy Game)	CBS	W 26–14	69,943	
December 30	1:00 p.m.	vs. No. 23 Boston College	Bank of America Stadium; Charlotte, NC (Meinke Car Care Bowl)	ESPN	L 24–25	52,303	
Rankings from AP Poll released prior to the game
