= 2010 Poinsettia Bowl =

2010 San Diego County Credit Union Poinsettia Bowl
Navy Midshipmen	San Diego State Aztecs
(9–3)	(8–4)
Independent	Mountain West
14	35
Head coach: Ken Niumatalolo	Head coach: Brady Hoke
	1	2	3	4	Total
Navy	0	14	0	0	14
San Diego State	14	7	0	14	35
- Date: December 23, 2010
- Season: 2010
- Stadium: Qualcomm Stadium
- Location: San Diego, California
- MVP: RB Ronnie Hillman, SDSU (Offensive) SS Andrew Preston, SDSU (Defensive)
- Favorite: SDSU by 3.5
- Referee: Steve Strimling (WAC)
- Attendance: 48,049
- Payout: US$750,000

United States TV coverage
- Network: ESPN
- Announcers: Mike Patrick, Craig James and Holly Rowe
- Nielsen ratings: 2.3 / 3.56M

The 2010 San Diego County Credit Union Poinsettia Bowl was a post-season college football bowl game between the San Diego State Aztecs and the Navy Midshipmen on December 23, 2010 at Qualcomm Stadium in San Diego, California. The sixth edition of the annual Poinsettia Bowl, which the Aztecs won 35–14, began at 5:00 p.m. PST and was broadcast on ESPN.

== Teams ==
=== Navy Midshipmen ===
The 2010 game marked Navy's third appearance in the Poinsettia Bowl. Previously, they had defeated the Colorado State Rams 51–30 in the inaugural 2005 Poinsettia Bowl and lost 35–32 to the Utah Utes in the 2007 game. At the end of the 2009 season, the Midshipmen upset the Missouri Tigers in the Texas Bowl with a score of 35–13. The 2010 game was the eighth straight bowl game appearance for the Midshipmen.

=== San Diego State Aztecs ===
This was San Diego State's first bowl appearance since the 1998 Las Vegas Bowl. Under second year head coach Brady Hoke the Aztecs posted an 8–4 regular season record. Although this is SDSU's first appearance in the Poinsettia bowl the game was the second time that the Aztecs played a bowl game at Qualcomm Stadium. They were defeated by Iowa in the 1986 Holiday Bowl, 39–38. The Midshipmen and the Aztecs had previously played each other twice, in 1994 and 1997, with San Diego State winning both contests with scores of 56–14 and 45–31.

== Navy ==
Leading the Midshipmen were quarterback Ricky Dobbs, wide receiver Greg Jones, and linebacker Tyler Simmons.

== San Diego State ==
Statistical leaders for the Aztecs were running back Ronnie Hillman, quarterback Ryan Lindley, and wide receiver DeMarco Sampson.

== Game Summary ==
Following seven straight days of rain in Southern California (often referred to as a Pineapple Express), the San Diego River overflowed and the stadium and surrounding parking lot were flooded. Thanks to external pumps, the field was cleared the morning of the game.

=== Scoring summary ===
Scoring Play	Score
1st Quarter
SDSU - Ronnie Hillman 22-yard run (Abel Perez kick), 9:06	SDSU 7–0
SDSU - Ryan Lindley 53-yard pass to Vincent Brown (Abel Perez kick), 4:08	SDSU 14–0
2nd Quarter
NAVY - Ricky Dobbs 30-yard pass to Greg Jones (Joe Buckley kick), 14:10	SDSU 14–7
SDSU - Ronnie Hillman 37-yard run (Abel Perez kick), 3:15	SDSU 21–7
NAVY - Ricky Dobbs 1-yard run (Joe Buckley kick), 0:07	SDSU 21–14
3rd Quarter
No scoring	SDSU 21–14
4th Quarter
SDSU - Ryan Lindley 15-yard pass to Ronnie Hillman (Abel Perez kick), 14:56	SDSU 28–14
SDSU - Ronnie Hillman 1-yard run (Albel Perez kick), 6:07	SDSU 35–14

== Final statistics ==
Statistics	Navy	SDSU
First downs	22	27
Total offense, plays-yards	66-382	64-555
Rushes-yards (net)	51-235	41-279
Passes, Comp-Att-Yds	8-15-147	18-23-276
Fumbles-Interceptions	0-1	0-0
Time of Possession	29:41	30:19

Hillman set a new bowl game record of 228 yards rushing, previously held by Navy's Adam Ballard since 2005.
