= Jo-Lonn Dunbar =

American football player (born 1985)

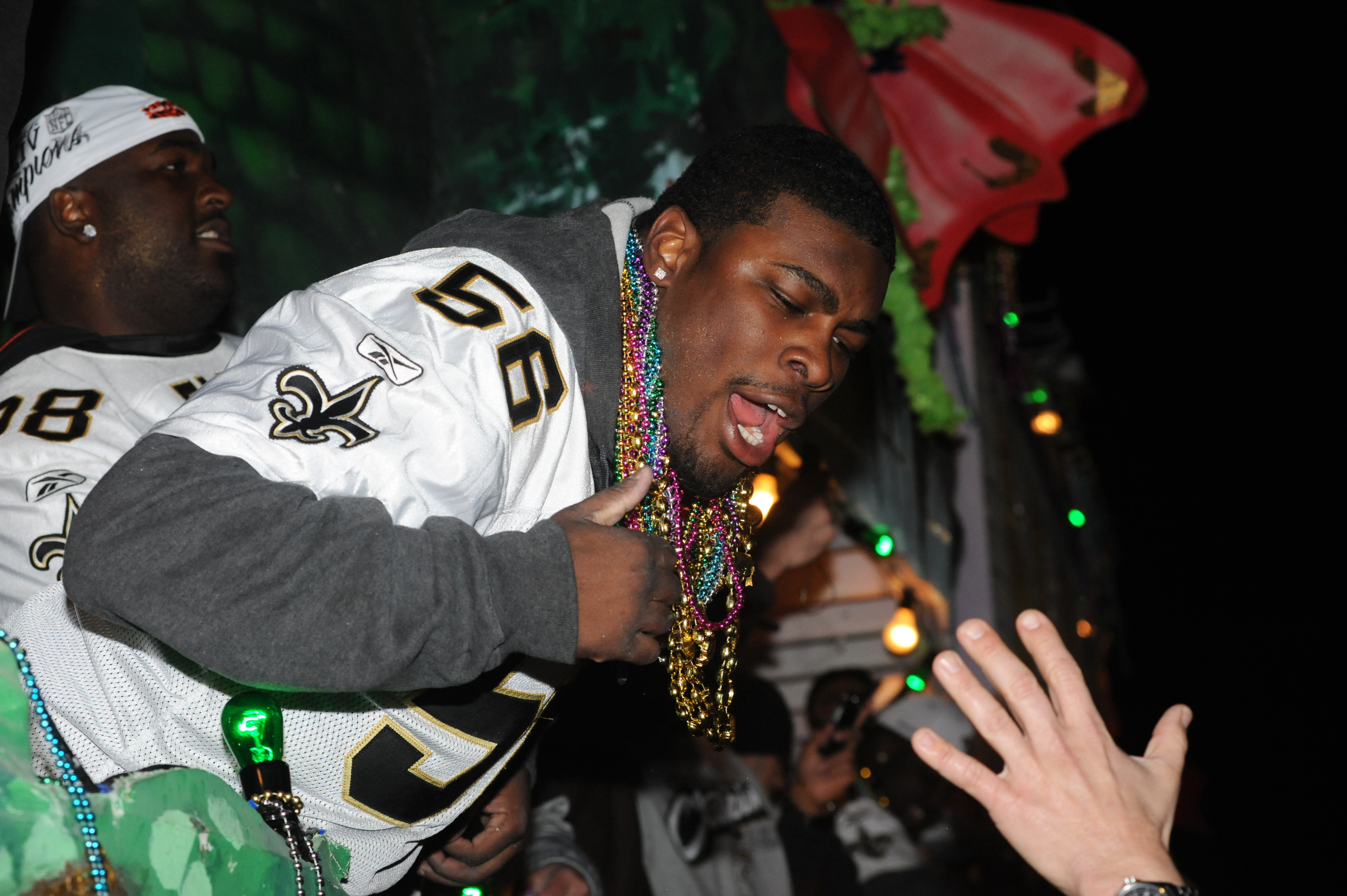
- Dunbar at the 2010 Saints victory parade

No. 56, 58, 54
- Position: Linebacker

Personal information
- Born: March 13, 1985 (age 41); Syracuse, New York, U.S.
- Listed height: 6 ft 0 in (1.83 m)
- Listed weight: 235 lb (107 kg)

Career information
- High school: Syracuse (NY) Corcoran
- College: Boston College
- NFL draft: 2008: undrafted

Career history
- New Orleans Saints (2008–2011); St. Louis Rams (2012–2015); New Orleans Saints (2015)

Awards and highlights
- Super Bowl champion (XLIV); Second-team All-ACC (2007)

Career NFL statistics
- Total tackles: 360
- Sacks: 6.5
- Forced fumbles: 4
- Fumble recoveries: 1
- Interceptions: 2
- Stats at Pro Football Reference

Jo-Lonn D. Dunbar (born March 13, 1985) is an American former professional football player who was a linebacker for eight seasons in the National Football League (NFL). He was signed by the New Orleans Saints as an undrafted free agent in 2008. He also played for the St. Louis Rams. He played college football at Boston College.

== Early life ==
Dunbar attended Corcoran High School in Syracuse, New York where he played running back and linebacker, under the head coach Leo Cosgrove. He earned All-State Class AA first-team honors as a senior running back and second-team All-State as a junior, when he competed as a linebacker. He added All-American accolades from Super Prep and was an All-East choice by Tom Lemming's Prep Football Report.

== College career ==
During his senior year at Boston College, Dunbar received recognition by becoming the fourth player in NCAA history to return two fumbles for touchdowns in a single game. In 2006, he was named MVP of the 2006 Meineke Car Care Bowl; he recovered 3 fumbles, returning two for touchdowns. At the end of his college career, he registered 262 tackles (156 solo) with 2.5 sacks for -12 yards and 21.5 stops for losses of 58 yards. He caused three fumbles and deflected seven passes. He gained 45 yards on two of interceptions, returning one for a touchdown.

== Professional career ==
=== New Orleans Saints (first stint) ===
During his first season with the Saints, Dunbar made a brief trip into the NFL spotlight when he made an impressive block to allow Reggie Bush to return a punt for a touchdown on Monday Night Football against the Minnesota Vikings.

Dunbar continued to play backup linebacker and special teams in the 2009 season. He suffered a hamstring injury in the Saints' December 6, 2009 game against the Washington Redskins, and was placed on the injured reserve list on December 8. The Saints went on to win Super Bowl XLIV.

=== St. Louis Rams ===
Dunbar signed with the St. Louis Rams on April 2, 2012.

In Week 1 of the 2012 season against the Detroit Lions, Dunbar recorded his first career interception, returning it 42 yards. He finished his first season with the Rams with 114 combined tackles, 4.5 sacks and two interceptions which were all career highs for him at the time.

On August 14, 2013, the NFL announced that Dunbar had violated the NFL's policy on performance-enhancing substances and he will be suspended for the first four games of the 2013 regular season. He was later released from the team.

Dunbar was re-signed by the Rams on October 1, 2013.

In 2015, Dunbar found himself further down on the Rams depth chart, and was not activated for any games. He was released by the team on October 27, 2015.

=== New Orleans Saints (second stint) ===
After he was released by St. Louis, the Saints signed Dunbar on October 30, 2015 to provide depth in light of injuries to starting linebackers Dannell Ellerbe and David Hawthorne. On November 23, 2015, he was waived by the team.

== NFL career statistics ==
Legend
**Bold**	Career high

=== Regular season ===
Year	Team	Games		Tackles					Interceptions					Fumbles			
Year	Team	GP	GS	Cmb	Solo	Ast	Sck	TFL	Int	Yds	TD	Lng	PD	FF	FR	Yds	TD
2008	NOR	15	2	20	17	3	0.0	0	0	0	0	0	2	0	0	0	0
2009	NOR	9	3	20	13	7	0.0	0	0	0	0	0	0	0	0	0	0
2010	NOR	13	8	40	32	8	1.0	5	0	0	0	0	2	0	**1**	0	0
2011	NOR	**16**	14	79	57	22	1.0	4	0	0	0	0	**6**	**2**	0	0	0
2012	STL	**16**	**16**	**115**	**91**	**24**	**4.5**	**16**	**2**	**63**	0	**42**	5	**2**	0	0	0
2013	STL	12	10	39	33	6	0.0	4	0	0	0	0	0	0	0	0	0
2014	STL	**16**	10	36	29	7	0.0	4	0	0	0	0	0	0	0	0	0
2015	NOR	3	1	11	5	6	0.0	1	0	0	0	0	0	0	0	0	0
Career		100	64	360	277	83	6.5	34	2	63	0	42	15	4	1	0	0

=== Playoffs ===
Year	Team	Games		Tackles					Interceptions					Fumbles			
Year	Team	GP	GS	Cmb	Solo	Ast	Sck	TFL	Int	Yds	TD	Lng	PD	FF	FR	Yds	TD
2010	NOR	1	0	**7**	**4**	**3**	0.0	0	0	0	0	0	0	0	0	0	0
2011	NOR	**2**	**1**	4	**4**	0	0.0	**1**	0	0	0	0	0	0	0	0	0
Career		3	1	11	8	3	0.0	1	0	0	0	0	0	0	0	0	0
