= 2007 Navy Midshipmen football team =

American college football season

2007 Navy Midshipmen football
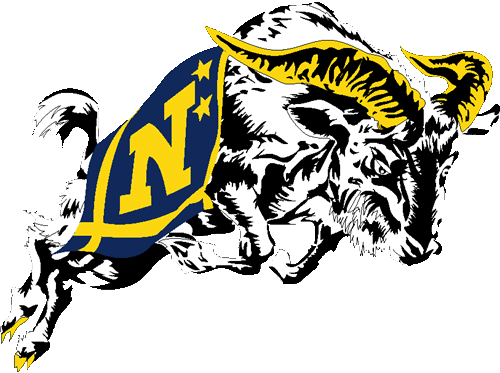

Poinsettia Bowl, L 32–35 vs. Utah
- Conference: Independent
- Record: 8–5
- Head coach: Paul Johnson (6th season; regular season); Ken Niumatalolo (bowl game)
- Offensive scheme: Triple option
- Defensive coordinator: Buddy Green (5th season)
- Base defense: Multiple
- MVP: Reggie Campbell
- Captains: Reggie Campbell; Jeff Deliz; Irv Spence
- Home stadium: Navy–Marine Corps Memorial Stadium

2007 NCAA Division I FBS independents football records
	Conf.			Overall
Team	W		L	W		L
Navy		–		8	–	5
Army		–		3	–	9
Notre Dame		–		3	–	9
Rankings from AP Poll

The 2007 Navy Midshipmen football team represented the United States Naval Academy (USNA) as an independent during the 2007 NCAA Division I FBS football season. The team was led by sixth-year head coach Paul Johnson until he accepted the head coaching position at Georgia Tech prior to the team's final game of the season. Offensive line coach Ken Niumatalolo was first promoted to interim head coach and then named as the team's permanent head coach.

After beginning the season with a 4–4 record through the first eight games, including a loss to Football Championship Subdivision (FCS) foe Delaware, the Midshipmen broke a 43-year losing streak in the Navy–Notre Dame football rivalry in the 2007 Navy vs. Notre Dame football game by winning in triple overtime. The next week, the team became bowl eligible by winning its sixth game of the season in the 2007 Navy vs. North Texas football game, which set a record for the most points scored in a regulation-length FBS college football game. The Midshipmen finished the regular season with an 8–4 record and secured a berth in the 2007 Poinsettia Bowl, which had a single-year tie-in with the USNA. The other tie-in was with the Mountain West Conference (MWC). In a close game that came down to the final seconds, Navy lost the game to the Utah Utes with a score of 35–32.

== Schedule ==
Date	Time	Opponent	Site	TV	Result	Attendance	Source
August 31	7:00 p.m.	at Temple	Lincoln Financial Field; Philadelphia, PA	ESPNU	W 30–19	30,368	
September 7	7:00 p.m.	at No. 15 Rutgers	Rutgers Stadium; Piscataway, NJ	ESPN	L 24–41	43,514	
September 15	5:00 p.m.	Ball State	Navy–Marine Corps Memorial Stadium; Annapolis, MD	CSTV	L 31–34 ^{OT}	32,087	
September 22	1:00 p.m.	Duke	Navy–Marine Corps Memorial Stadium; Annapolis, MD	CSTV	W 46–43	31,278	
September 29	1:00 p.m.	Air Force	Navy–Marine Corps Memorial Stadium; Annapolis, MD (Commander-in-Chief's Trophy)	CSTV	W 31–20	37,615	
October 10	8:00 p.m.	at Pittsburgh	Heinz Field; Pittsburgh, PA	ESPN	W 48–45 ^{2OT}	30,103	
October 20	1:00 p.m.	Wake Forest	Navy–Marine Corps Memorial Stadium; Annapolis, MD	CSTV	L 24–44	36,992	
October 27	1:00 p.m.	No. 9 (FCS) Delaware	Navy–Marine Corps Memorial Stadium; Annapolis, MD	CSTV	L 52–59	35,213	
November 3	2:30 p.m.	at Notre Dame	Notre Dame Stadium; Notre Dame, IN (rivalry)	NBC	W 46–44 ^{3OT}	80,795	
November 10	3:00 p.m.	at North Texas	Fouts Field; Denton, TX		W 74–62	26,012	
November 17	3:30 p.m.	Northern Illinois	Navy–Marine Corps Memorial Stadium; Annapolis, MD	CSTV	W 35–24	34,517	
December 1	12:00 p.m.	vs. Army	M&T Bank Stadium; Baltimore, MD (Army–Navy Game)	CBS	W 38–3	71,610	
December 20	7:00 p.m.	vs. Utah	Qualcomm Stadium; San Diego, CA (Poinsettia Bowl)	ESPN	L 32–35	39,129	
Rankings from AP Poll released prior to the game; All times are in Eastern time

== Game summaries ==
=== Notre Dame ===
Team	1	2	3	4	OT	2OT	3OT	Total
• Navy	0	14	6	8	7	3	8	46
Notre Dame	7	14	0	7	7	3	6	44

- Date: November 3
- Location: Notre Dame Stadium, South Bend, Indiana
- Game start: 2:30 p.m. EST
- Elapsed time: 3:55
- Game attendance: 80,795
- Game weather: Sunny; 54 °F (12 °C); wind 14 mph (23 km/h) NW
- Referee: Tom DeJoseph
- TV announcers (NBC): Tom Hammond and Pat Haden

Scoring summary
Q1	11:40	ND	Hughes 3 yard run (Walker kick)	ND 7–0
Q2	14:56	NAVY	Singleton 2 yard run (Bullen kick)	Tie 7–7
Q2	8:59	ND	Thomas 1 yard run (Walker kick)	ND 14–7
Q2	4:06	NAVY	White 8 yard run (Bullen kick)	Tie 14–14
Q2	:12	ND	Kamara 21 yard pass from Sharpley (Walker kick)	ND 21–14
Q3	6:37	NAVY	Kettani 1 yard run (kick failed)	ND 21–20
Q4	10:24	NAVY	Kuhar-Pitters 16 yard fumble return (Kaheaku-Enhada run)	NAVY 28–21
Q4	3:25	ND	Thomas 3 yard run (Walker kick)	Tie 28–28
OT		NAVY	Kettani 1 yard run (Bullen kick)	NAVY 35–28
OT		ND	Kamara 8 yard pass from Sharpley (Walker kick)	Tie 35–35
2OT		ND	Walker 26 yard field goal	ND 38–35
2OT		NAVY	Bullen 32 yard field goal	Tie 38–38
3OT		NAVY	Campbell 25 yard pass from Kaheaku-Enhada (Campbell pass from Kaheaku-Enhada)	NAVY 46–38
3OT		ND	Thomas 5 yard run (run failed)	NAVY 46–44

== Roster ==
2007 Navy Midshipmen football team roster
Players
Coaches
Offense

Pos.	#	Name	Class
G	79	Osei Asante	So
C	71	Reyn Kaupiko	Sr
WR	80	O. J. Washington	Sr
QB	2	Jarod Bryant	Jr
QB	14	Tony Goss	Sr

Defense

Pos.	#	Name	Class
S	17	Jeff Deliz	Jr

Special teams

Pos.	#	Name	Class

Head coach

- Paul Johnson

Coordinators/assistant coaches

- Brian Bohannon (wide receivers)

Legend

- (C) Team captain
- (S) Suspended
- (I) Ineligible
- Injured
- Redshirt

Roster
