= 2006 Meineke Car Care Bowl =

Navy Midshipmen	Boston College Eagles
(9–3)	(9–3)
Independent	ACC
24	25
Head coach: Paul Johnson	Head coach: Frank Spaziani
	AP / Coaches / BCS; 23 / 23 / 24
	1	2	3	4	Total
Navy	7	14	3	0	24
Boston College	6	10	0	9	25
- Date: December 30, 2006
- Season: 2006
- Stadium: Bank of America Stadium
- Location: Charlotte, North Carolina
- MVP: LB Jo-Lonn Dunbar (Boston College)
- Referee: Ed Ardito (C-USA)
- Attendance: 52,303

United States TV coverage
- Network: ESPN
- Announcers: Pam Ward; Mike Gottfried; Jimmy Dykes
- Nielsen ratings: 3.7

The 2006 Meineke Car Care Bowl was a college football bowl game. It featured the Navy Midshipmen, and the Boston College Eagles. The game was played on Saturday, December 30, 2006, at 1:00 p.m. EST.

Boston College got on the board first following a 2-yard touchdown run by quarterback Matt Ryan. The extra point failed, and Boston College led 6–0. Navy quarterback, Kaipo-Noa Kaheaku-Enhada, known as a running quarterback, surprised BC by throwing a 31-yard touchdown pass to wide receiver Tyree Barnes, to put Navy on top 7–6.

In the second quarter, Navy used its powerful option running attack, and Zerbin Singleton plowed five yards for a touchdown to increase Navy's lead to 14–6. Running back Brian Toal answered for Boston College with a 1-yard touchdown run to make it 14–13. Kaheaku-Enhada once again threw a touchdown pass, this one covering 24 yards to Jason Tomlinson to increase Navy's lead to 21–13. With no time left in the half, kicker Steve Aponavicius drilled a 26-yard field goal, to cut the lead to 21–16.

In the third quarter, Navy was poised to score a touchdown, but BC's defense held strong, and forced a field goal. Matthew Harmon]connected on the 22-yard field goal to extend Navy's lead to 24–16. With 7:36 left in the fourth quarter, Ryan found tight end Ryan Purvis for a 25-yard touchdown pass. The two-point conversion attempt failed, and Navy still led 24–22.

Navy had the ball, with 1:43 left in the game, and Boston College had no time outs left. On the next play, Reggie Campbell fumbled an option pitch, that was recovered by BC's Jo-Lonn Dunbar at the Navy 40-yard line. Ryan threw a 16-yard pass to Ryan Purvis to get BC into field goal range. Steve Aponavicius drilled a 37-yard field goal as time expired to give Boston College the 25–24 win. The win extended BC's streak of consecutive bowl wins to seven.
