= Most consecutive NCAA football wins over one opponent =

The following is a list of the all-time leading NCAA Division I FBS (Football Bowl Subdivision) college football single-opponent winning streaks. Streaks are ranked by the number of consecutive wins posted by one team against a regular opponent. All streaks active and historical streaks of at least 20 games are included.

This list excludes rivalries involving current Division I Football Championship Subdivision (FCS) schools, and thus excludes the all-time NCAA record for most consecutive wins by one rival over another: Yale (now an FCS team) beat Wesleyan University (Connecticut) (now a Division III team) 46 times in a row between 1875 and 1913. The two teams have not played each other since that 1913 game (which Yale won at home, 21–0).

The FCS record for most consecutive wins by one team over another in an uninterrupted series is 32 victories in a row by Grambling over Prairie View between 1977 and 2009; this streak includes the 1990 season, when Prairie View's team went into recess due to a lack of players and financial problems. That streak began when Grambling was in the old Division I and Prairie View was in Division II.

Additionally, there are two series that involve multiple winning streaks of 20+ games. Oklahoma defeated Kansas State in 32 consecutive games from 1937 to 1968, then the Sooners won 22 in a row over the Wildcats from 1971 to 1992. Ohio State also owns multiple 20+ game winning streaks over Indiana, winning 23 in a row from 1960 to 1986 and held a 28-game winning streak over the Hoosiers from 1991 to 2024.

Most consecutive wins over an opponent
School	Opponent	Consecutive wins	Year started	Last win	Uninterrupted series?	Notes/References
Notre Dame	Navy	43	1964	2006	Yes	Navy won in 2007
Nebraska	Kansas	36	1969	2004	Yes	KU won in 2005
Princeton	Rutgers	33	1869	1937	No (68-year period)	
Oklahoma	Kansas State	32	1937	1968	Yes	
Penn State	Temple	31	1952	2014	No (63-year period)	Penn State had a 39-game unbeaten streak against Temple dating back to 1941; the teams played to a tie in 1950. Temple broke the streak in 2015.
Florida	Kentucky	31	1987	2017	Yes	Longest in-conference streak in Southeastern Conference history. Kentucky snapped the streak in 2018.
Nebraska	Kansas State	29	1969	1997	Yes	
Clemson	Virginia	29	1955	1989	No (35-year period)	Longest in-conference streak in Atlantic Coast Conference history. Virginia snapped the streak in 1989.
Ohio State	Indiana	29	1991	2024	No	Indiana defeated Ohio State in the 2025 Big Ten Championship Game. The 2010 game was vacated due to self-imposed sanctions by Ohio State.
Texas	Rice	28	1966	1993	Yes	
Princeton	Penn	28	1876	1891	No (25-year period)	
Syracuse	Hobart	26	1906	1931	Yes	
USC	Oregon State	26	1968	1999	No (32-year period)	
Tennessee	Kentucky	26	1985	2010	Yes	Kentucky won in 2011. Rivalry formerly known as the Battle for the Barrel
Penn State	West Virginia	25	1959	1983	Yes	
Michigan	Indiana	24	1988	2019	No	Indiana snapped the streak in 2020.
Texas	TCU	24	1968	1991	Yes	
Nebraska	Oklahoma State	24	1974	1999	No	
Texas A&M	TCU	**24**†	1973	2001	No (29-year period)	Texas A&M won 23 consecutive games against TCU from 1973 to 1995 while they were both members of the old Southwest Conference. Texas A&M beat TCU again in the 2001 Galleryfurniture.com Bowl, and the teams have not played since then.
Nebraska	Missouri	24	1979	2002	Yes	
Penn State	Maryland	24	1962	1988	No (27-year period)	The streak began following Maryland's first win in the series in 1961, and finally ended with the only tie in 1989. Penn State would end up with a 29-game unbeaten streak over Maryland before the Terps defeated the Nittany Lions in 2014.
Oregon	Idaho	**24**†	1951	2024	No	
Alabama	Vanderbilt	23	1985	2022	No	Vanderbilt won in 2024.
Oklahoma	Iowa State	23	1937	1959	Yes	
Ohio State	Indiana	23	1960	1986	No	
Tennessee	Vanderbilt	22	1983	2004	Yes	
Arkansas	TCU	22	1959	1980	Yes	
Alabama	Mississippi State	22	1958	1979	Yes	
Iowa	Northwestern	22	1974	1994	Yes	Northwestern's 1995 team also ended a 19-game (30 year) losing streak to Michigan and a 14-game (33 year) losing streak to Notre Dame.
LSU	Louisiana	**22**†	1902	2009	No (108-year period)	LSU and Louisiana have only played each other 22 times total, giving LSU a 22–0 lead in the series - the most meetings between two NCAA teams without both teams having at least one win.
Florida	Vanderbilt	22	1989	2012	No (24-year period)	The series was uninterrupted since 1992 (21 wins). Vanderbilt won in 2013
Florida State	Duke	22	1992	2023	No (31-year period)	Duke snapped the 0–22 streak in 2024 with their first victory over Florida State
Oklahoma	Kansas State	22	1971	1992	Yes	
Ohio State	Northwestern	21	1972	2003	No (33-year period)	Northwestern won in 2004.
Ohio State	Wisconsin	21	1960	1980	Yes	
Harvard	Brown	21	1893	1913	No (30-year period)	
Purdue	Iowa	20	1961	1980	Yes	
Oklahoma	Baylor	20	1901	2011	No (111-year period)	Baylor ended the streak with a 45–38 victory in 2011.

† Active Streaks in bold

== References and sources ==
- "Streaks and Rivalries" (PDF). Official 2007 NCAA Division I Football Records Book. NCAA. 2007. p. 112. Archived from the original (PDF) on September 30, 2007., ISSN 0735-5475
