= 2007 Navy vs. Notre Dame football game =

Navy snaps 43-year losing streak
- Non-conference game
Navy Midshipmen	Notre Dame Fighting Irish
(4–4)	(1–7)
46	44
Head coach: Paul Johnson	Head coach: Charlie Weis
	1	2	3	4	OT	2OT	3OT	Total
Navy	0	14	6	8	7	3	8	46
Notre Dame	7	14	0	7	7	3	6	44
- Date: November 3, 2007
- Season: 2007
- Stadium: Notre Dame Stadium
- Location: South Bend, Indiana, U.S.
- National anthem: Band of the Fighting Irish
- Halftime show: Band of the Fighting Irish
- Attendance: 80,795

United States TV coverage
- Network: NBC
- Announcers: Tom Hammond, Pat Haden and Alex Flanagan (sideline)

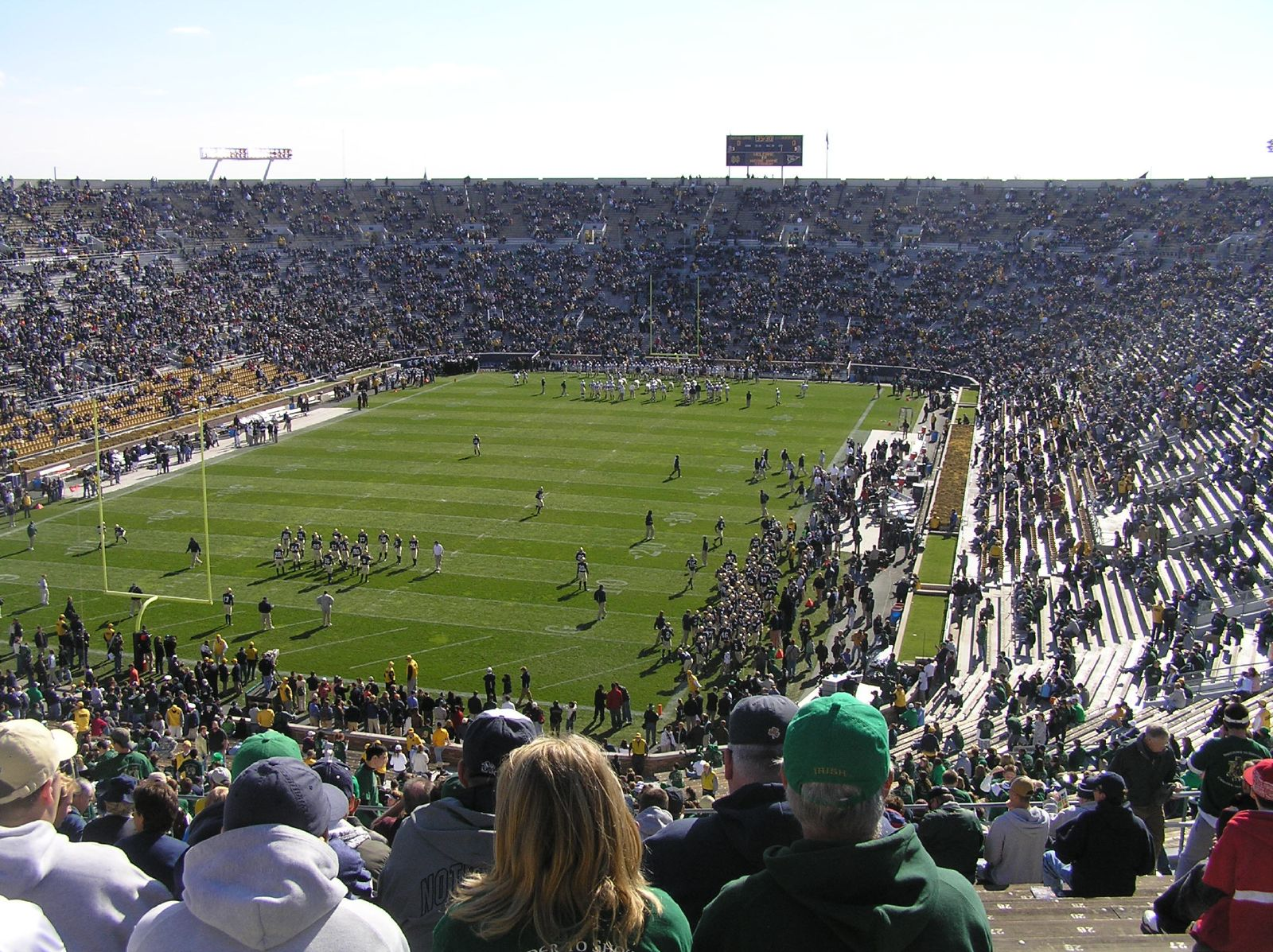
Pre-game warmups

The 2007 Navy vs. Notre Dame football game ended the longest all-time college football consecutive wins streak by one team over another. On November 3, 2007, the Navy Midshipmen defeated the Notre Dame Fighting Irish 46–44 in triple-overtime at Notre Dame's home field, Notre Dame Stadium in South Bend, Indiana. Notre Dame came into this annual game with 43 straight wins against Navy since the last loss against Heisman Trophy winner Roger Staubach in 1963. With the win, Navy improved to 5–4 and Notre Dame fell to 1–8 on the season.

== Leading into the game ==
The Navy–Notre Dame football rivalry is the longest running college football series between two teams not in the same conference. The 2007 Notre Dame Fighting Irish football team began the season with a 33–3 loss to Georgia Tech. It was the most lopsided loss Notre Dame had ever suffered in a season-opening game. Notre Dame then lost to Penn State, Michigan (38–0), Michigan State, and Purdue It was the first time in school history for Notre Dame to open the season with five losses. Notre Dame's worst opening before 2007 was 0–3.

The Fighting Irish snapped their losing streak with a win at UCLA but then lost to Boston College and USC to fall to 1–7. With only four regular season games remaining, Notre Dame was assured of a losing season and they were out of contention for a bowl game.

The 2007 Navy Midshipmen football team was off to a better start. They had achieved victories against Temple, Duke, Air Force, and Pittsburgh. Losses against Rutgers, Ball State, Wake Forest, and Delaware put them 4–4 on the season. With four games remaining in the season, Navy needed to win at least two in order to be invited to a bowl game. The Poinsettia Bowl had arranged for the Midshipmen to play in that bowl if they reached six wins.

At the time, both teams played NCAA Division I FBS football as independent teams, unaffiliated with any conference. The game was televised nationally by NBC, which has the exclusive TV broadcast rights to Notre Dame home games.

== Game summary ==
Notre Dame made the first score of the game, a 3-yard touchdown run by Robert Hughes. It was the only score of the first quarter. Each team scored a pair of touchdowns in the second quarter, to give the Irish a 21–14 lead at halftime.

Navy scored a touchdown in the third quarter but they missed the potential game-tying extra point. It was the only score of the third quarter. In the fourth quarter, Navy's Chris Kuhar-Pitters collected a fumble at the Notre Dame 16 yard line and ran it in for a touchdown. Kaipo-Noa Kaheaku-Enhada rushed for the two-point conversion to take a 28–21 lead – their first of the game. Notre Dame tied the score with a touchdown. The game eventually went to overtime, with the aid of a questionable decision from Irish head coach Charlie Weis: With 45 seconds left in regulation, Notre Dame faced a fourth-and-8 on the Navy 24; instead of attempting a 41-yard field goal that could have won the game, Weis opted to go for the first down. The gamble backfired in spectacular fashion when Navy sacked quarterback Evan Sharpley, with Midshipmen linebacker Ram Vela literally leaping over a blocker to assist in the sack.

In the first overtime, Notre Dame won the coin toss and elected to go on defense. Navy scored a touchdown and their extra point was good. The Irish replied with a touchdown and extra point to bring up the second overtime. This time, each team scored a field goal, necessitating a third overtime.

NCAA rules at the time stipulated that, beginning with the third overtime, teams may not kick an extra point after making a touchdown; instead, they must go for a two-point conversion. Navy went to the air; Reggie Campbell caught a 25-yard pass from Kaheaku-Enhada on their first play from scrimmage. Kaheaku-Enhada threw again to Campbell for the successful two-point conversion. Notre Dame also scored a touchdown on their possession. Their first attempt at the conversion ended in an incomplete pass, but Navy was called for pass interference on the play. The Irish got a second chance at the conversion, this time from the 1 1/2-yard line instead of the 3. They opted for a running play, but Navy stuffed the attempt at the line of scrimmage. That gave Navy the 46–44 win.

== Analysis ==
The game ended the longest streak for most consecutive wins by one team over another in college football. Prior to the game, Notre Dame had achieved 43 straight wins against Navy since the last loss in 1963, when Roger Staubach was quarterback for Navy. The game was the fifth straight home loss for the Irish, establishing a new school record.

After the game, Notre Dame coach Charlie Weis was asked whether the game, following Notre Dame's 38–0 loss to USC, was a low point for the Fighting Irish. He said, "A low point is when you get beat 38–0. That's a low point. A low point is when the game is going OK and one team is pulling away from you and making plays when you're not making plays. The low point for me is we didn't win the game."

Navy coach Paul Johnson said, "It's a big win for our program. It's a big win for the academy. I'm happy I don't have to answer anything else about the streak every time we play." Weis, on the other-hand, was not bothered by being the coach of the team that allowed Navy to end the streak. He said the 43-year winning streak had no meaning to him or his team.

ESPN reported, "For Notre Dame, it was its school-record fifth straight home loss, another low point in a season of lows."

With this streak broken, the Kentucky Wildcats held the two longest active losing streaks to an annual opponent in Division I FBS. Their streak of 22 losses to Tennessee at that time reached 26 before the Wildcats ended that streak on November 26, 2011. The Wildcats' losing streak against Florida, which was 20 at the end of the 2006 season and 21 by the time of this Navy–Notre Dame game, ended in 2018 at 31 games. Temple had a 31-game losing streak to Penn State in a series played discontinuously since 1941, though it ended in 2015.

== See also ==
- College football rules
- American football strategy
- Glossary of American football
- Most consecutive wins over one opponent (NCAA football)
