= Paul Johnson (American football coach, born 1957) =

American college football coach

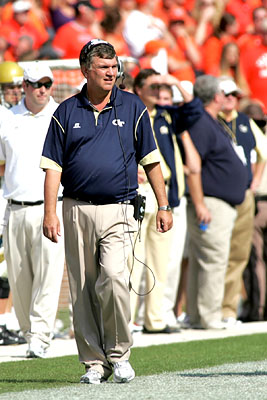
- Johnson on the sidelines facing Clemson in 2008

Biographical details
- Born: August 20, 1957 (age 69); Newland, North Carolina, U.S.
- Education: Western Carolina (B.S., 1979); Appalachian State (M.S., 1982)

Coaching career (HC unless noted)
- 1979–1980: Avery County HS (NC) (OC/OL)
- 1981–1982: Lees–McRae (OC)
- 1983–1984: Georgia Southern (DL)
- 1985–1986: Georgia Southern (OC)
- 1987–1994: Hawaii (OC)
- 1995–1996: Navy (OC)
- 1997–2001: Georgia Southern
- 2002–2007: Navy
- 2008–2018: Georgia Tech

Head coaching record
- Overall: 189–100
- Bowls: 5–8
- Tournaments: 14–3 (NCAA D-I-AA playoffs)

Accomplishments and honors

Championships
- 2 NCAA Division I-AA (1999, 2000); 5 SoCon (1997–2001); 1 ACC (2009, vacated); 4 ACC Coastal Division (2008, 2009, 2012, 2014)

Awards
- Eddie Robinson Award (1998); 2× AFCA Division I-AA Coach of the Year (1999, 2000); Bobby Dodd Coach of the Year Award (2004); 2× SoCon Coach of the Year (1997, 1998); 3× ACC Coach of the Year (2008, 2009, 2014)
- College Football Hall of Fame; Inducted in 2023 (profile)

Paul Clayton Johnson (born August 20, 1957) is an American former college football coach. He served as the head football coach at Georgia Southern University from 1997 to 2001, the United States Naval Academy from 2002 to 2007, and Georgia Tech, from 2008 to 2018, compiling a career college football coaching record of 189–100. Johnson's Georgia Southern Eagles won consecutive NCAA Division I-AA Football Championships in 1999 and 2000. Noted for his use of the flexbone spread option offense, Johnson was inducted into the College Football Hall of Fame in 2023.

== Early life and education ==
Johnson earned his Bachelor of Science degree in physical education from Western Carolina University in 1979, where he was a member of the Kappa Alpha Order. He did not play college football. He also earned a Master of Science in health and physical education from Appalachian State University in 1982.

== Coaching career ==
Johnson started his college career at Georgia Southern University in 1983, where he served as offensive coordinator for consecutive NCAA Division I-AA National Football Championships teams in 1985 and 1986. From 1983 to 1986 they would win 40 games and score 619 points in 15 games in 1986. Those teams were led by QB Tracy Ham who would go on to be a successful QB in the Canadian Football League.

He then spent eight seasons as offensive coordinator at the University of Hawaii at Manoa from 1987 to 1994. Their offense averaged 372 points scored per season during his 8 years there and won 54 games. While at Hawaii he would coach future collegiate head coach Ken Niumatalolo. In 1992 they would finish with their best record in school history at 11–2, including a win in the Holiday Bowl over the University of Illinois. They would also win the Western Athletic Conference title that season.

In 1995 and 1996, he served as the offensive coordinator at the United States Naval Academy and brought his option offense with him. In 1996, Navy recorded its first winning season in 14 years, going 9–3 with a victory in the Aloha Bowl. Their 9–3 record was the best since 1978 and their 392 points scored were the most in school history up to that point.

Johnson began his head coaching career by returning to Georgia Southern, which he led from 1997 through 2001. During his tenure, the Eagles captured the Division I-AA National Championship twice more in 1999 and 2000, and finished as runner-up in 1998. During his tenure as head coach, they finished with a record of 62–10 (86.1% winning rate).

Johnson is one of only four coaches to record 50 wins in his first four seasons as head coach at the Division I level.

=== Navy (2002–2007) ===
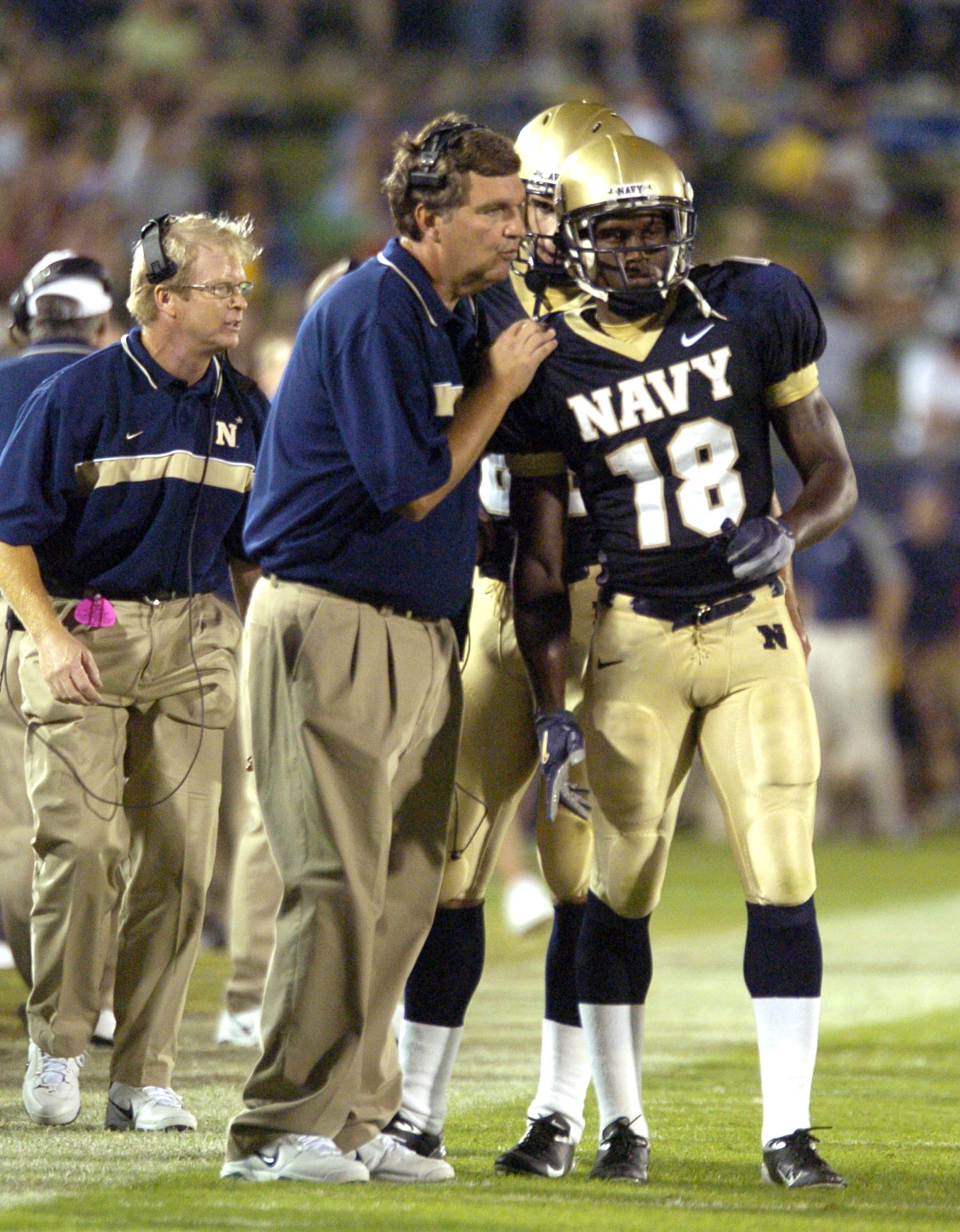
Johnson at a Navy game against the Duke Blue Devils in 2004.

In 2002, Johnson departed Georgia Southern and returned to Navy as head coach. Johnson's initial season saw the Midshipmen win only two of 12 games, though the season ended on a high note with his first victory over Army, which would not beat Navy again until 2016. Subsequently, Johnson's teams enjoyed a high degree of success.

The 2003 team completed the regular season with an 8–4 mark, including wins over both Air Force and Army, and earned a berth in the Houston Bowl, Navy's first bowl game since 1996. However, the Midshipmen lost to Texas Tech, 38–14.

In 2004, Johnson's team posted the program's best record since 1957, finishing the regular season at 9–2 and once again earning a bowl berth, this time in the Emerald Bowl. There Johnson coached the Midshipmen to a win over New Mexico, 34–19, the fifth bowl win in the school's history. The win gave Navy 10 wins on the season, tying a school record that had stood since 1905. For his efforts, Johnson received the Bobby Dodd Coach of the Year Award.

The 2005 Navy squad recorded a mark of 8–4, highlighted by victories over Army, Air Force, and Colorado State in the inaugural Poinsettia Bowl.

Johnson dominated the Commander-in-Chief's Trophy competition, going 11–1 (.917) in his six years, with the only loss against another service academy coming at the hands of Air Force in his first season. He was the first coach in Navy's history to go 6–0 in his first six seasons against Army (Ken Niumatalolo, who followed Johnson at Navy, went 8–0 against Army in his first eight seasons), and his 2006 senior class was the first in Navy history to win the Commander-in-Chief's Trophy all four of their years.

Much of Johnson's success was predicated on his triple option flexbone offense, a run-oriented attack that led NCAA Division I-A/FBS football in rushing yards three of his last four years at Navy. Some have criticized the triple option as gimmick offense unfit for major college football, which may have explained the reluctance of some top programs to offer him a position despite his accomplishments at both Georgia Southern and Navy. Johnson rebutted this argument in numerous press conferences and interviews, asserting that several top teams, including 2005 national champion Texas and 2006 national champion Florida, used various forms of the option. In 2008, Johnson told ESPN's Mark Schlabach, "If we can run it against Boston College at Navy, why can't we run it against Boston College at Georgia Tech? If we can beat Pitt with this system at Navy, why can't we beat Pitt at Georgia Tech? Are we going to get worse players at Georgia Tech?"

In 2007, he led Navy to beat Notre Dame for the first time since 1963. Navy won in triple overtime, 46-44, ending a 43-game losing streak against Notre Dame.

=== Georgia Tech (2008–2018) ===
On December 7, 2007, Johnson accepted the head coaching job at the Georgia Institute of Technology. Johnson, who came to Georgia Tech in December after a six-year tenure at Navy, inherited a young roster with reduced numbers because of an NCAA probation. Only 76 players were on scholarship, below the maximum of 85, including three senior walk-ons who were awarded scholarships prior to the start of the season. The roster included 75 freshmen and sophomores; 16 of 22 starters were underclassmen. Sports Illustrated predicted Johnson's first Yellow Jacket team would win three games and finish fourth in the Atlantic Coast Conference's Coastal Division.

In 2008, Johnson led the Georgia Tech Yellow Jackets to a 9–4 record. Georgia Tech was 6–1 at home in games played at Bobby Dodd Stadium and 4–2 against ranked opponents, including three wins in November against Florida State, Miami, and Georgia. Georgia Tech, ranked 14th in the BCS standings and 15th in the AP Poll, finished the regular season with a 9–3 record. Though they tied for first place in their division with a 5–3 conference record, the Yellow Jackets failed to advance to the ACC Championship Game by virtue of an early-season loss to eventual ACC champion, Virginia Tech. Georgia Tech accepted a bid to the Chick-Fil-A Bowl, where they were defeated by LSU, 38–3.

Johnson's 2008 Georgia Tech team featured one first-team All-American (Michael Johnson), the ACC Player of the Year (Jonathan Dwyer), and eight first team, second team, and honorable mention All-ACC selections. On December 2, 2008, Johnson was tabbed as ACC Coach of the Year by the Atlantic Coast Sports Media Association (ACSMA). He said, "This is an honor for the football program at Georgia Tech, the coaching staff and the players. There are a lot of great coaches in the ACC, so it's humbling to win such a prestigious honor." Johnson was also named 2008 National Coach of the year by CBSSports.com on the same day.

In 2009, Johnson led the Yellow Jackets to an 11–3 record, including the school's first win at Florida State in school history, and a victory over #4 Virginia Tech in Atlanta, which broke a 17-game home losing streak to top five opponents, and the program's first win over Virginia in Charlottesville since 1990. After a defeat at the hands of Miami in the third week of the season, Georgia Tech won its next eight games, rising as high as #7 in the AP Poll, before losing to unranked rival Georgia in Atlanta to end the regular season. Georgia Tech finished a league-best 7–1 in ACC play and defeated Clemson in the ACC Championship Game for the school's first outright conference championship since 1990. This current title has been vacated by the NCAA for rules violations, which stemmed from what the NCAA described as an isolated instance of former standout wide receiver Demaryius Thomas allegedly receiving $312 in impermissible gifts, and grew to Morgan Burnett allegedly taking gifts and misleading NCAA investigators. Both players denied these allegations and Georgia Tech filed an appeal, which was denied.

Following the end of the regular season, Johnson received ACC Coach of the Year honors for the second consecutive year, becoming the only Georgia Tech head coach in history to win the award in his first two seasons. The Yellow Jackets were paired in the Orange Bowl with the 10th ranked Iowa Hawkeyes. Iowa beat Georgia Tech 24–14, sending Johnson to 0–2 in bowls at Georgia Tech.

In 2010, Georgia Tech started the season ranked 16th in the AP Poll. However, the team suffered a number of high-profile injuries, including to starting quarterback Joshua Nesbitt. The team finished the regular season 6–6 and lost in the Independence Bowl to Air Force 14–7.

In 2011, Johnson led the team to its first 6–0 start since 1990 and set a number of school offensive records in the team's 66–24 blowout of Kansas. Johnson proceeded to lose two consecutive games to Virginia and Miami before defeating then #5 Clemson 31–17. The team finished the regular season with an 8–4 record, and then lost to Utah in the Sun Bowl on December 31, 2011.

In 2012, Johnson's Yellow Jackets got off to a slow start at 3–5, when then defensive coordinator Al Groh was terminated by Johnson. With Charles Kelly coaching the defense thereafter, Georgia Tech won its next three games, and clinched a spot in the 2012 ACC Championship Game in Charlotte. Though the Jackets were defeated by Florida State 21–15, the Tech defense shut out the Seminoles in the second half. The Jackets finished the season with a 21–7 win over the preseason #1 team, USC, in the Hyundai Sun Bowl in El Paso, Texas.

In 2013, Georgia Tech led Georgia 20–0 in the second quarter and 27–17 in the fourth quarter before losing 41–34 in double overtime. The Jackets finished the year 7–6 after a 23–17 loss to Ole Miss in the Music City Bowl.

In 2014, Johnson led Georgia Tech to their fourth Coastal Division title during his tenure and a spot in the 2014 ACC Championship Game. Johnson and the Jackets were predicted to finish sixth in the Coastal division by ESPN in the preseason, but again went beyond expectations and achieved a 10-win regular season, first place in the Coastal Division, and a 10th-place ranking in AP Poll. The Yellow Jackets fell two points short in the ACC title game to the defending national champions, Florida State, but were still selected for their second Orange Bowl berth in six seasons. The season saw the Jackets beat its key rivals Virginia Tech, Miami, Clemson and Georgia. On December 31, 2014, Paul Johnson led the Yellow Jackets to a big win in the CFP "Big 6" Orange Bowl. This was the second Orange Bowl Johnson's Jackets earned a bid to play. The other came against #11 Iowa on January 5, 2010. The 12th ranked Yellow Jackets dominated the game in the second half and finished their season with a 49–34 win over seventh-ranked Mississippi State.

In 2015, Georgia Tech had its first losing season under Paul Johnson's tenure, going 3–9 that year. However, the Yellow Jackets did beat fifth-ranked Florida State at Bobby Dodd Stadium, blocking a field goal attempt and returning it for a touchdown as time expired.

In 2016, Johnson led Georgia Tech to a bounce-back 9–4 season. After starting 3-3, Georgia Tech won six out of its last 7, including wins against nationally ranked Virginia Tech and Georgia. They would eventually beat Kentucky in the TaxSlayer Bowl 33–18, and finished #26 in the AP Poll.

Tech had yet another disappointing season under Johnson in 2017, going 5–6. This marked the second time the Jackets missed out on a bowl game during Johnson's tenure. Georgia Tech lost five out of six games by a touchdown or less.

In 2018, Georgia Tech finished the regular season 7–5 with wins over ACC foes Miami and Virginia Tech. Tech also finished 2nd in the ACC Coastal Division, marking the 7th time his teams have finished in 1st or 2nd place. Johnson announced his retirement on November 28, 2018, effective following the team's bowl game against the Minnesota Golden Gophers.

== Personal life ==
Johnson met his wife, Susan (Propst), when both were students at Western Carolina University, and they married in 1980. They have a daughter, Kaitlyn, who was born in 1993.

== Head coaching record ==
Year	Team	Overall	Conference	Standing	Bowl/playoffs	Coaches^{#}	AP/TSN^{°}
Georgia Southern Eagles (Southern Conference) (1997–2001)
1997	Georgia Southern	10–3	7–1	1st	L NCAA Division I-AA Quarterfinal		8
1998	Georgia Southern	14–1	8–0	1st	L NCAA Division I-AA Championship		2
1999	Georgia Southern	13–2	7–1	T–1st	W NCAA Division I-AA Championship		1
2000	Georgia Southern	13–2	7–1	1st	W NCAA Division I-AA Championship		1
2001	Georgia Southern	12–2	7–1	T–1st	L NCAA Division I-AA Semifinal		3
Georgia Southern:		62–10	36–4				
Navy Midshipmen (NCAA Division I-A / FBS independent) (2002–2007)
2002	Navy	2–10					
2003	Navy	8–5			L Houston		
2004	Navy	10–2			W Emerald	24	24
2005	Navy	8–4			W Poinsettia		
2006	Navy	9–4			L Meineke Car Care		
2007	Navy	8–4*			Poinsettia*		
Navy:		45–29		*Poinsettia Bowl coached by Ken Niumatalolo			
Georgia Tech Yellow Jackets (Atlantic Coast Conference) (2008–2018)
2008	Georgia Tech	9–4	5–3	T–1st (Coastal)	L Chick-Fil-A	22	22
2009	Georgia Tech	10–3 (Note: Due to NCAA sanctions, Georgia Tech was forced to vacate all contests won after November 24, 2009 during the 2009 season, which included the ACC Championship victory. The school submitted an appeal of these sanctions on September 9, 2011, which was denied.)	7–1	1st (Coastal)	L Orange^{†}	13	13
2010	Georgia Tech	6–7	4–4	T–3rd (Coastal)	L Independence		
2011	Georgia Tech	8–5	5–3	T–2nd (Coastal)	L Sun		
2012	Georgia Tech	7–7	5–3	T–1st (Coastal)	W Sun		
2013	Georgia Tech	7–6	5–3	T–2nd (Coastal)	L Music City		
2014	Georgia Tech	11–3	6–2	1st (Coastal)	W Orange^{†}	7	8
2015	Georgia Tech	3–9	1–7	7th (Coastal)			
2016	Georgia Tech	9–4	4–4	5th (Coastal)	W TaxSlayer		
2017	Georgia Tech	5–6	4–4	3rd (Coastal)			
2018	Georgia Tech	7–6	5–3	2nd (Coastal)	L Quick Lane		
Georgia Tech:		82–61	51–37				
Total:		189–100					
National championship Conference title Conference division title or championship game berth
^{†}Indicates BCS or CFP / New Years' Six bowl.; ^{#}Rankings from final Coaches Poll.; ^{°}Rankings from final AP Poll.
