= 2005 Poinsettia Bowl =

2005 San Diego County Credit Union Poinsettia Bowl
Colorado State Rams	Navy Midshipmen
(6–5)	(8–3)
Mountain West	Independent
30	51
Head coach: Sonny Lubick	Head coach: Paul Johnson
	1	2	3	4	Total
Colorado State	10	0	14	6	30
Navy	7	20	14	10	51
- Date: December 22, 2005
- Season: 2005
- Stadium: Qualcomm Stadium
- Location: San Diego, California
- MVP: Reggie Campbell(Offense); Tyler Tidwell (Defense)
- Referee: Stan Evans (MAC)
- Attendance: 36,842
- Payout: US$750,000 per team

United States TV coverage
- Network: ESPN2
- Announcers: Gary Bender; Bill Curry; Dave Ryan
- Nielsen ratings: 0.89

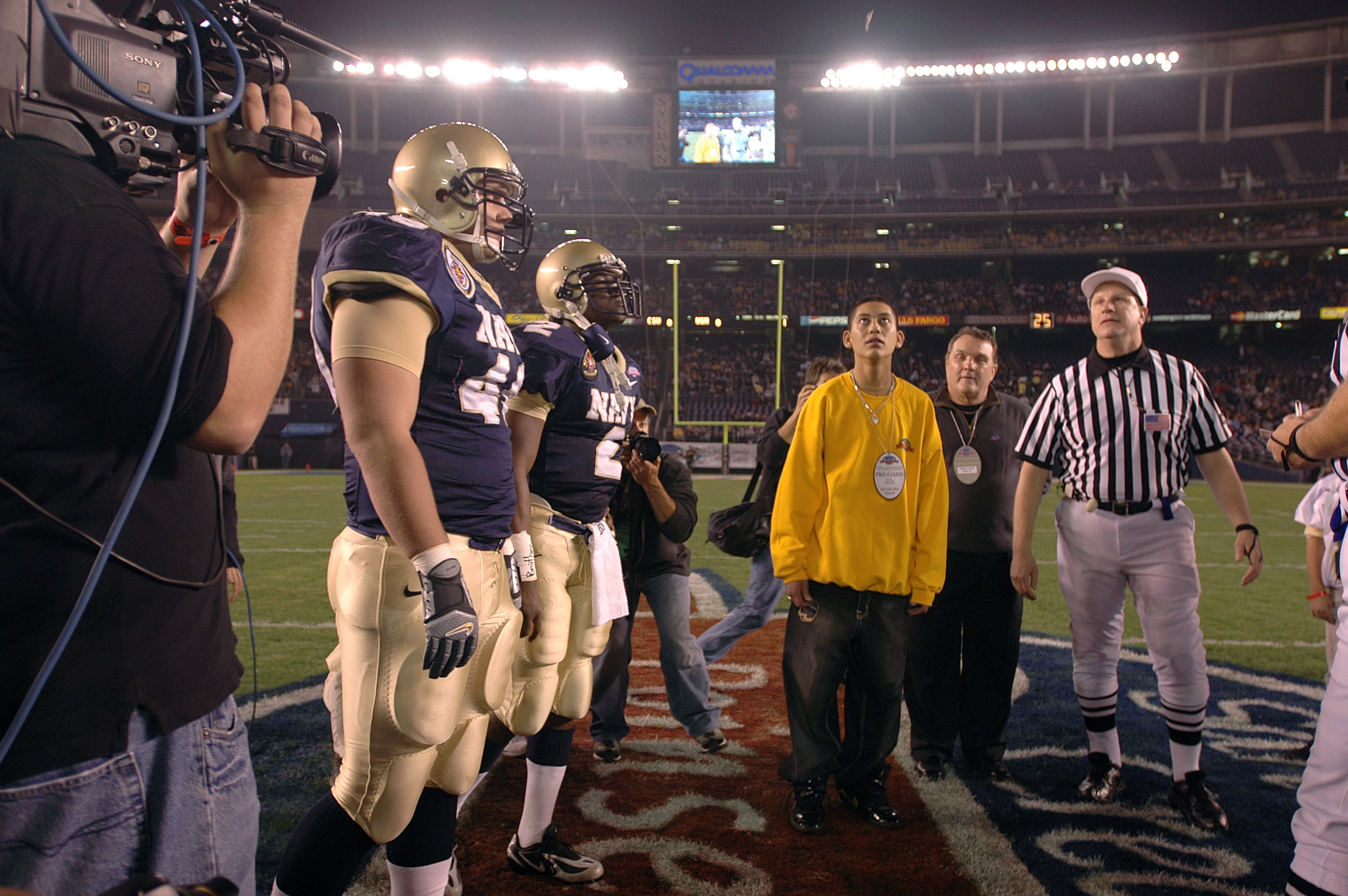
U.S. Naval Academy defensive end (DE) Jeremy Chase and Quarterback (QB) Lamar Owens look on as a coin is flipped at the start of the inaugural Poinsettia Bowl.

The 2005 San Diego County Credit Union Poinsettia Bowl was a post-season college football bowl game between the Colorado State Rams and the Navy Midshipmen on December 22, 2005 at Qualcomm Stadium in San Diego, California, United States. The game, which the Midshipmen won with a score of 51–30, was the inaugural edition of the Poinsettia Bowl.
