= Reggie Campbell =

American football player and naval aviator (born 1985)

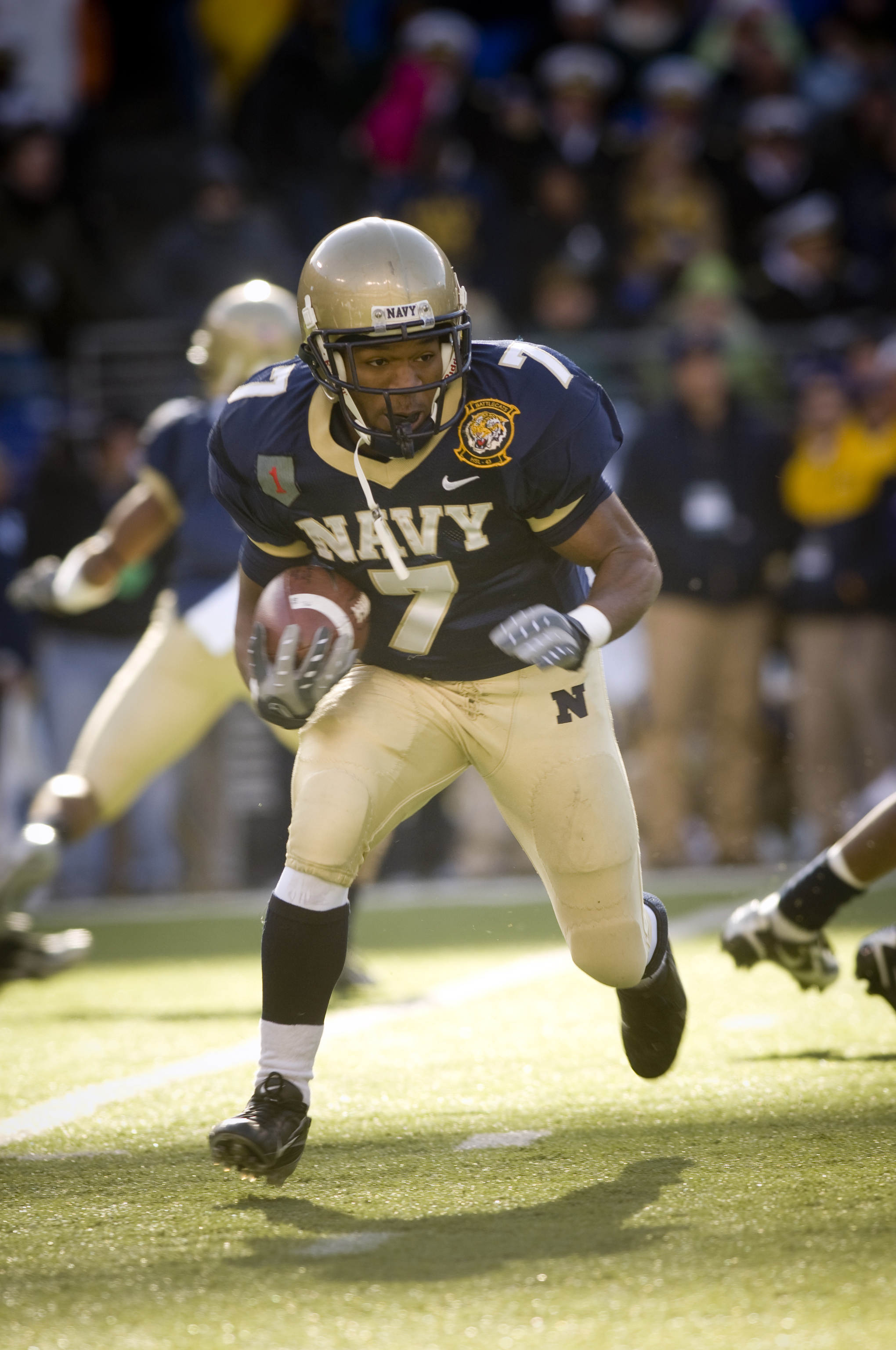

No. 7
- Position: Slotback

Personal information
- Born: August 10, 1985 (age 41); Sanford, Florida
- Listed height: 5 ft 6 in (1.68 m)
- Listed weight: 168 lb (76 kg)

Career information
- High school: Lake Mary (Lake Mary, Florida)
- College: Navy Midshipmen (2004–2007)

Reggie Campbell (born August 10, 1985) is an American former football player for the United States Naval Academy team, the Navy Midshipmen. Reggie Campbell is a naval aviator in the United States Navy Reserve.
