= Navy–Notre Dame football rivalry =

American college football rivalry

- Navy Midshipmen Notre Dame Fighting Irish
- First meeting: October 15, 1927; Notre Dame, 19–6
- Latest meeting: October 31, 2026; Notre Dame, 35–13
- Next meeting: November 20, 2027; South Bend, IN
- Stadiums: Gillette Stadium (2026); M&T Bank Stadium (2022); Aviva Stadium (2023); MetLife Stadium (2024); Notre Dame Stadium (2025)
- Trophy: None (1927–2010); Rip Miller Trophy (2011–present)

Statistics
- Total meetings: 99
- All-time series: Notre Dame leads, 83–13–1 (.861)
- Trophy series: Notre Dame leads, 14–1 (.923)
- Largest victory: Navy, 33–7 (1956); Notre Dame, 56–7 (1970)
- Longest win streak: Notre Dame, 43 (1964–2007)
- Current win streak: Notre Dame, 9 (2017–present)

Locations of Notre Dame and Navy

The Navy–Notre Dame football rivalry is an American college football rivalry between the Navy Midshipmen football team of the United States Naval Academy and Notre Dame Fighting Irish football team of the University of Notre Dame. It was played annually from 1927 to 2019, which made it the longest uninterrupted intersectional rivalry in college football, the third-longest uninterrupted college football rivalry overall, as well as the second-longest never-interrupted rivalry in Division I college football (FBS). Due to the COVID-19 pandemic, the 2020 game was canceled, ending these lengthy streaks, even though both schools still played a fall season schedule in 2020.

Notre Dame leads the series 83–13–1. Before Navy won a 46–44 triple-overtime contest in 2007, Notre Dame had a 43-game winning streak that was the longest series win streak between two annual opponents in the history of Division I FBS football. Navy's previous win came in 1963, 35–14 with future Heisman Trophy winner and NFL quarterback Roger Staubach at the helm. Navy had come close to winning on numerous occasions before 2007. The Midshipmen subsequently won again in 2009, 2010 and 2016.

Since 2011, the Rip Miller Trophy has been awarded to the winner of the game. The trophy is named after Edgar "Rip" Miller, who played college football for Notre Dame and served as a longtime coach and administrator at Navy.

== Host sites ==
Though the game is often played at Notre Dame Stadium in South Bend whenever Notre Dame is the home team, it has never been played at Navy–Marine Corps Memorial Stadium in Annapolis due to its relatively small size. Instead, Navy usually hosts the game at larger facilities such as Baltimore's old Memorial Stadium or current M&T Bank Stadium, FedExField in Landover, Maryland, or at Giants Stadium or MetLife Stadium in East Rutherford, New Jersey. From 1960 to 1970, the Midshipmen hosted the game at John F. Kennedy Stadium in Philadelphia, and they hosted the 1972, 1974 and 1993 games at Philadelphia's Veterans Stadium.

On occasion, the rivalry took place in other stadiums away from the East Coast, particularly in cities with large populations of United States Navy personnel. Cleveland Stadium hosted games between 1932 and 1978 as Cleveland, Ohio, had a considerable swath of naval officers, while the 2016 game was held at EverBank Field in Jacksonville, Florida, where Naval Air Station Jacksonville and Naval Station Mayport are located. Navy's 2018 home game was played at SDCCU Stadium in San Diego, California, which has multiple military installations and the largest naval fleet in the world, in the rivalry's first meeting west of the Mississippi River.

The game has been played three times in Dublin, Ireland—in 1996 at Croke Park and 2012 and 2023 at the Aviva Stadium. A return to Aviva in 2020 was called off due to the COVID-19 pandemic, with the game first being moved to Annapolis before finally being canceled altogether; this would have been the first time the game was played at Navy's home stadium.

== History ==
Despite the one-sided result the last few decades, most Notre Dame and Navy fans consider the series a sacred tradition for historical reasons. Both schools have strong football traditions going back to the beginnings of the sport. Notre Dame, like many colleges, faced severe financial difficulties during World War II, which were exacerbated by the fact that it was then still an all-male institution. The US Navy made Notre Dame a training center for V-12 candidates and paid enough for usage of the facilities to keep the University afloat. Notre Dame has since extended an open invitation for Navy to play the Fighting Irish in football and considers the game annual repayment on a debt of honor.

The series is marked by mutual respect, as evidenced by each team standing at attention during the playing of the other's alma mater after the game, a tradition that started in 2005. Navy's athletic director Chet Gladchuk Jr., on renewing the series through 2016, remarked "...it is of great interest to our collective national audience of Fighting Irish fans, Naval Academy alumni, and the Navy family at large." The series is scheduled to continue indefinitely; renewals are a mere formality. On August 6, 2020, Navy and Notre Dame signed an agreement continuing their rivalry series for the next 12 seasons, from 2021 through 2032.

The 2020 game was canceled due to the COVID-19 pandemic and the resulting disruption to college football schedules. Notre Dame opted to play an Atlantic Coast Conference schedule for that one season only. The ACC allowed each team to play one non-conference game, which had to be in the school's home state. Western Michigan originally agreed to make the short trip from Kalamazoo to South Bend on September 19, but the Broncos subsequently canceled their entire fall season. Notre Dame subsequently scheduled a home game on that date against South Florida of the American Athletic Conference instead. Notre Dame won that game 52–0. Meanwhile, the Midshipmen opted to play independent BYU instead of Notre Dame, in Annapolis; BYU routed Navy 55–3 behind closed doors.

=== The Streak ===
Notre Dame's NCAA-record 43-game win streak against Navy began in 1964:

- 1964 – Notre Dame 40, Navy 0: Notre Dame came in at 5–0 under first year coach Ara Parseghian and shut out the Midshipmen in a game that pitted 1963 Heisman Trophy winner Roger Staubach against 1964 winner John Huarte.
- 1969 – Notre Dame 47, Navy 0: The Irish set a still-standing, single-game school record of 720 total offensive yards.
- 1974 – Notre Dame 14, Navy 6: For three quarters, Navy kept the Fighting Irish offense in check with its punting game and led 6–0 going into the fourth quarter. Notre Dame quarterback Tom Clements threw a touchdown pass to Pete Demmerle to put the Fighting Irish in front, then Randy Harrison added an insurance touchdown with an interception return. Unbeknownst to anyone at the time, Irish coach Ara Parseghian privately decided to resign at the end of the season after this game.
- 1976 – Notre Dame 27, Navy 21: Irish defensive back Dave Waymer tipped away a fourth down pass in the end zone late in the game to preserve the win for Notre Dame.
- 1984 – Notre Dame 18, Navy 17: John Carney's field goal with 14 seconds left erased a 17–7 deficit.
- 1991 – Notre Dame 38, Navy 0: Notre Dame's 700th victory.
- 1997 – Notre Dame 21, Navy 17: Allen Rossum saved the day for the Fighting Irish, knocking Navy receiver Pat McGrew out of bounds at the 1-yard line on a 69-yard pass as time ran out.
- 1999 – Notre Dame 28, Navy 24: Notre Dame needed a 1st down on 4th and 9 with 1:37 left. They failed to convert but an errant spot allowed the Irish to keep possession and eventually score to escape with a 28–24 win.
- 2002 – Notre Dame 30, Navy 23: Notre Dame, coming off a 14–7 upset loss to Boston College, scored 15 unanswered points late in the fourth quarter to win under first-year head coach Tyrone Willingham.
- 2003 – Notre Dame 27, Navy 24: D. J. Fitzpatrick's 40-yard field goal as time expired lifted the Fighting Irish over Navy.
- 2007 – Navy 46, Notre Dame 44 (3OT) – After 43 years, Navy beat Notre Dame in triple overtime.

== Game results ==
Navy victories	Notre Dame victories	Tie games	Vacated win (Note: Notre Dame's wins in 2012 and 2013 were vacated as a result of NCAA sanctions against the Notre Dame football program issued on November 22, 2016, after the NCAA found that a student-trainer committed academic misconduct for two football players and provided six other players with impermissible academic extra benefits. The NCAA also rejected Notre Dame's appeal on February 13, 2018. This win is not included in Notre Dame's all-time record, nor is it counted in the series record between the two teams. See Wikipedia:WikiProject College football/Vacated victories for an explanation of how vacated victories are recorded.)

No.	Date	Location	Winner	Score
1	October 15, 1927	Baltimore, MD	Notre Dame	19–6
2	October 13, 1928	Chicago, IL	Notre Dame	7–0
3	October 12, 1929	Baltimore, MD	Notre Dame	14–7
4	October 11, 1930	South Bend, IN	Notre Dame	26–2
5	November 14, 1931	Baltimore, MD	Notre Dame	20–0
6	November 19, 1932	Cleveland, OH	Notre Dame	12–0
7	November 4, 1933	Baltimore, MD	Navy	7–0
8	November 10, 1934	Cleveland, OH	Navy	10–6
9	October 26, 1935	Baltimore, MD	Notre Dame	14–0
10	November 7, 1936	Baltimore, MD	Navy	3–0
11	October 23, 1937	South Bend, IN	Notre Dame	9–7
12	November 5, 1938	Baltimore, MD	#4 Notre Dame	15–0
13	October 21, 1939	Cleveland, OH	#2 Notre Dame	14–7
14	November 9, 1940	Baltimore, MD	#7 Notre Dame	13–7
15	November 8, 1941	Baltimore, MD	#7 Notre Dame	20–13
16	October 31, 1942	Cleveland, OH	#4 Notre Dame	9–0
17	October 30, 1943	Cleveland, OH	#1 Notre Dame	33–6
18	November 4, 1944	Baltimore, MD	#6 Navy	32–13
19	November 3, 1945	Cleveland, OH	Tie	6–6
20	November 2, 1946	Baltimore, MD	#2 Notre Dame	28–0
21	November 1, 1947	Cleveland, OH	#1 Notre Dame	27–0
22	October 30, 1948	Baltimore, MD	#2 Notre Dame	41–7
23	October 29, 1949	Baltimore, MD	#1 Notre Dame	40–0
24	November 4, 1950	Cleveland, OH	Notre Dame	19–10
25	November 3, 1951	Baltimore, MD	#13 Notre Dame	19–0
26	November 1, 1952	Cleveland, OH	#13 Notre Dame	17–6
27	October 31, 1953	South Bend, IN	#1 Notre Dame	38–7
28	October 30, 1954	Baltimore, MD	#6 Notre Dame	6–0
29	October 29, 1955	South Bend, IN	#9 Notre Dame	21–7
30	November 3, 1956	Baltimore, MD	Navy	33–7
31	November 2, 1957	South Bend, IN	#16 Navy	20–6
32	November 1, 1958	Baltimore, MD	Notre Dame	40–20
33	October 31, 1959	South Bend, IN	Notre Dame	25–22
34	October 29, 1960	Philadelphia, PA	#4 Navy	14–7
35	November 4, 1961	South Bend, IN	Navy	13–10
36	November 3, 1962	Philadelphia, PA	Notre Dame	20–12
37	November 2, 1963	South Bend, IN	#4 Navy	35–14
38	October 31, 1964	Philadelphia, PA	#2 Notre Dame	40–0
39	October 30, 1965	South Bend, IN	#4 Notre Dame	29–3
40	October 29, 1966	Philadelphia, PA	#1 Notre Dame	31–7
41	November 4, 1967	South Bend, IN	#10 Notre Dame	43–14
42	November 2, 1968	Philadelphia, PA	#12 Notre Dame	45–14
43	November 1, 1969	South Bend, IN	#10 Notre Dame	47–0
44	October 31, 1970	Philadelphia, PA	#3 Notre Dame	56–7
45	October 30, 1971	South Bend, IN	#12 Notre Dame	21–0
46	November 4, 1972	Philadelphia, PA	#12 Notre Dame	42–23
47	November 3, 1973	South Bend, IN	#5 Notre Dame	44–7
48	November 2, 1974	Philadelphia, PA	#7 Notre Dame	14–6
49	November 1, 1975	South Bend, IN	#15 Notre Dame	31–10
50	October 30, 1976	Cleveland, OH	#11 Notre Dame	27–21
51	October 29, 1977	South Bend, IN	#5 Notre Dame	43–10

No.	Date	Location	Winner	Score
52	November 4, 1978	Cleveland, OH	#15 Notre Dame	27–7
53	November 3, 1979	South Bend, IN	#13 Notre Dame	14–0
54	November 1, 1980	East Rutherford, NJ	#3 Notre Dame	33–0
55	October 31, 1981	South Bend, IN	Notre Dame	38–0
56	October 30, 1982	East Rutherford, NJ	Notre Dame	27–10
57	October 29, 1983	South Bend, IN	#19 Notre Dame	28–12
58	November 3, 1984	East Rutherford, NJ	Notre Dame	18–17
59	November 2, 1985	South Bend, IN	Notre Dame	41–17
60	November 1, 1986	Baltimore, MD	Notre Dame	33–14
61	October 31, 1987	South Bend, IN	#9 Notre Dame	56–13
62	October 29, 1988	Baltimore, MD	#2 Notre Dame	22–7
63	November 4, 1989	South Bend, IN	#1 Notre Dame	41–0
64	November 3, 1990	East Rutherford, NJ	#2 Notre Dame	52–31
65	November 2, 1991	South Bend, IN	#5 Notre Dame	38–0
66	October 31, 1992	East Rutherford, NJ	#10 Notre Dame	38–7
67	October 30, 1993	Philadelphia, PA	#2 Notre Dame	58–27
68	October 29, 1994	South Bend, IN	Notre Dame	58–21
69	November 4, 1995	South Bend, IN	#8 Notre Dame	35–17
70	November 2, 1996	Dublin, Ireland	#19 Notre Dame	54–27
71	November 1, 1997	South Bend, IN	Notre Dame	21–17
72	November 14, 1998	Landover, MD	#12 Notre Dame	30–0
73	October 30, 1999	South Bend, IN	Notre Dame	28–24
74	October 14, 2000	Orlando, FL	#20 Notre Dame	45–14
75	November 17, 2001	South Bend, IN	Notre Dame	34–16
76	November 9, 2002	Baltimore, MD	#9 Notre Dame	30–23
77	November 8, 2003	South Bend, IN	Notre Dame	27–24
78	October 16, 2004	East Rutherford, NJ	Notre Dame	27–9
79	November 12, 2005	South Bend, IN	#7 Notre Dame	42–21
80	October 28, 2006	Baltimore, MD	#11 Notre Dame	38–14
81	November 3, 2007	South Bend, IN	Navy	46–44^{3OT}
82	November 15, 2008	Baltimore, MD	Notre Dame	27–21
83	November 7, 2009	South Bend, IN	Navy	23–21
84	October 23, 2010	East Rutherford, NJ	Navy	35–17
85	October 29, 2011	South Bend, IN	Notre Dame	56–14
86	September 1, 2012	Dublin, Ireland	Notre Dame^{†}	50–10
87	November 2, 2013	South Bend, IN	#25 Notre Dame^{†}	38–34
88	November 1, 2014	Landover, MD	#10 Notre Dame	49–39
89	October 10, 2015	South Bend, IN	#15 Notre Dame	41–24
90	November 5, 2016	Jacksonville, FL	Navy	28–27
91	November 18, 2017	South Bend, IN	#8 Notre Dame	24–17
92	October 27, 2018	San Diego, CA	#3 Notre Dame	44–22
93	November 16, 2019	South Bend, IN	#16 Notre Dame	52–20
94	November 6, 2021	South Bend, IN	#10 Notre Dame	34–6
95	November 12, 2022	Baltimore, MD	#20 Notre Dame	35–32
96	August 26, 2023	Dublin, Ireland	#13 Notre Dame	42–3
97	October 26, 2024	East Rutherford, NJ	#12 Notre Dame	51–14
98	November 8, 2025	South Bend, IN	#10 Notre Dame	49–10
99	October 31, 2026	Foxborough, MA	#5 Notre Dame	35–13
Series: Notre Dame leads 83–13–1
† Vacated by Notre Dame

== Television ==
In years when Navy hosts (even-numbered), ESPN holds rights to the game as part of an expanded deal with the American Athletic Conference, which Navy participates in for football. Prior to this, these rights belonged to CBS.

In years when Notre Dame hosts (odd-numbered), it is carried on NBC as per the university’s contract with the network.

== See also ==
- List of NCAA college football rivalry games
