= Navy Midshipmen football statistical leaders =

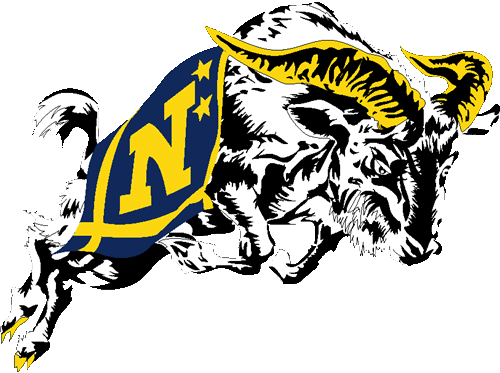

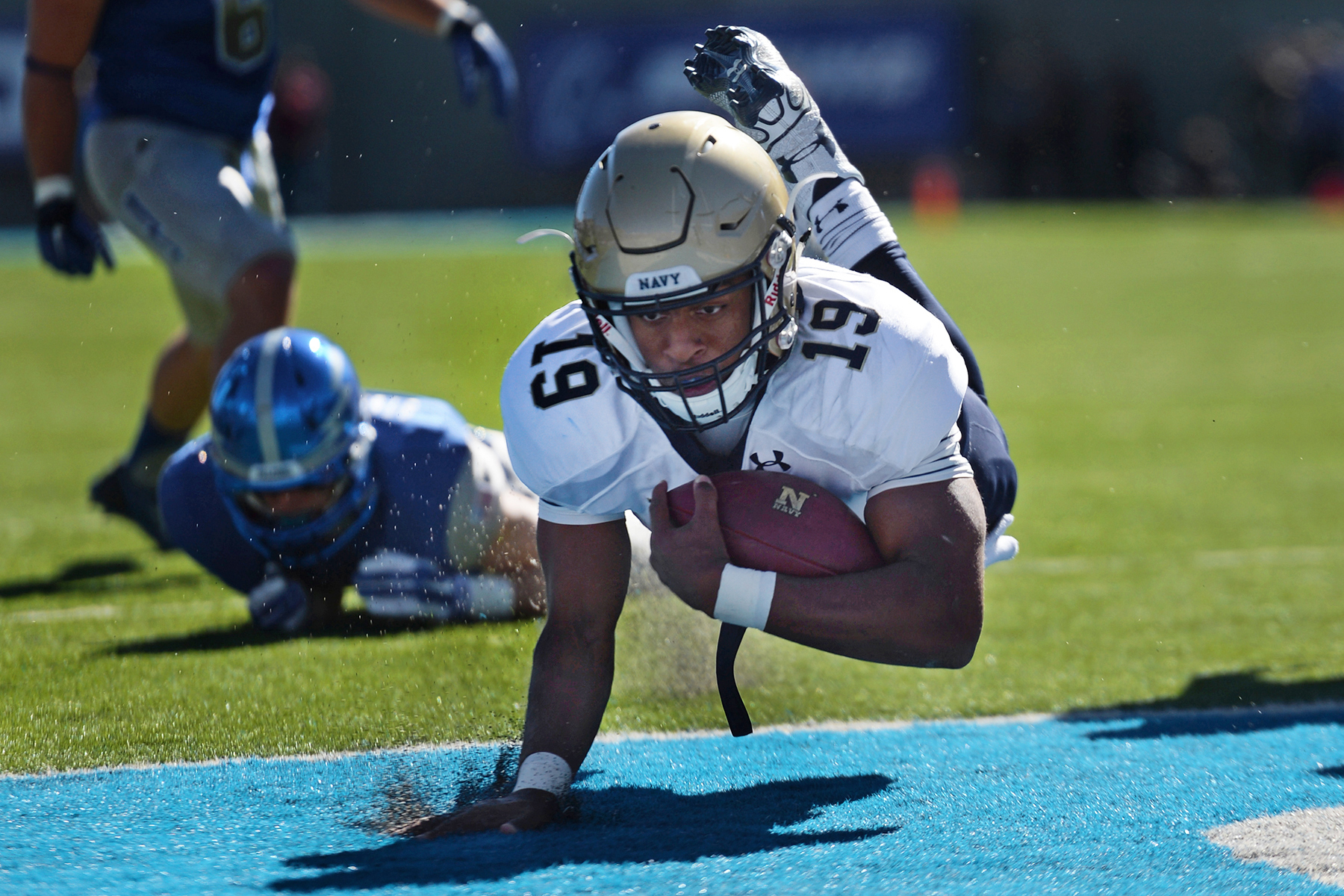
Keenan Reynolds holds the Division I FBS career record for rushing touchdowns and formerly held the record for points scored, in addition to holding Navy's career records for rushing yards, rushing touchdowns, passing touchdowns, total offense yards, and touchdowns responsible for.

The Navy Midshipmen football statistical leaders are individual statistical leaders of the Navy Midshipmen football program in various categories, including passing, rushing, receiving, total offense, defensive stats, and kicking. Within those areas, the lists identify single-game, single-season, and career leaders. The Midshipmen represent the United States Naval Academy in the NCAA Division I FBS American Conference.

Although Navy began competing in intercollegiate football in 1879, the school's official record book considers the "modern era" to have begun in 1938. Records from before this year are often incomplete and inconsistent, and they are generally not included in these lists.

These lists are dominated by more recent players for several reasons:

- Since 1938, seasons have increased from 10 games to 11 and then 12 games in length.
- The NCAA didn't allow freshmen to play varsity football until 1972 (with the exception of the World War II years), allowing players to have four-year careers.
- Bowl games only began counting toward single-season and career statistics in 2002. The Midshipmen have played in 17 bowls since then, allowing recent players an extra game almost every year to accumulate statistics.
- Navy also played in the American Conference Championship Game in 2016, giving players in that season yet another game to accumulate statistics.
- Navy tends to run a triple option offense, which emphasizes running with the quarterback and multiple running backs. This has allowed quarterbacks like Keenan Reynolds, Ricky Dobbs, and Blake Horvath to appear high on both rushing and passing lists.

These lists are updated through the end of the 2025 season.

== Passing ==
=== Passing yards ===
Career
Rank	Player	Yards	Years
1	Jim Kubiak	6,008	1991 1992 1993 1994
2	Bill Byrne	4,582	1984 1985 1986
3	Keenan Reynolds	4,001	2012 2013 2014 2015
4	Mike McNallen	3,996	1968 1969 1970
5	Bob Leszczynski	3,945	1976 1977 1978
6	John Cartwright	3,626	1965 1966 1967
7	Roger Staubach	3,571	1962 1963 1964
8	Alton Grizzard	3,492	1987 1988 1989 1990
9	Blake Horvath	3,017	2023 2024 2025
10	Ricky Dobbs	2,770	2008 2009 2010

Single season
Rank	Player	Yards	Year
1	Jim Kubiak	2,628	1993
2	Jim Kubiak	2,388	1994
3	Bill Byrne	1,694	1985
4	Blake Horvath	1,580	2025
5	John Cartwright	1,537	1967
6	Ricky Dobbs	1,527	2010
7	Bill Byrne	1,463	1986
8	Alton Grizzard	1,438	1990
9	Will Worth	1,397	2016
10	Ricky Williamson	1,394	1983

Single game
Rank	Player	Yards	Year	Opponent
1	Jim Kubiak	406	1991	Wake Forest
2	Bill Byrne	399	1985	Syracuse
3	Jim Kubiak	361	1994	Army
4	Bill Byrne	340	1984	Pittsburgh
5	Blake Horvath	339	2025	Air Force
6	Jim Kubiak	317	1993	Bowling Green
7	Keenan Reynolds	312	2015	Houston
8	Bob Misch	307	1985	South Carolina
9	Jim Kubiak	304	1993	Air Force
10	Brian Broadwater	302	2000	Tulane

=== Passing touchdowns ===
Career
Rank	Player	TDs	Years
1	Keenan Reynolds	31	2012 2013 2014 2015
2	Bill Byrne	29	1984 1985 1986
3	Blake Horvath	27	2023 2024 2025
4	Bob Leszczynski	26	1976 1977 1978
5	John Cartwright	25	1965 1966 1967
6	Jim Kubiak	23	1991 1992 1993 1994
7	Chris McCoy	21	1995 1996 1997
8	Alton Grizzard	20	1987 1988 1989 1990
	Ricky Dobbs	20	2008 2009 2010
10	Roger Staubach	18	1962 1963 1964

Single season
Rank	Player	TDs	Year
1	Ricky Dobbs	13	2010
	Blake Horvath	13	2024
3	Alton Grizzard	12	1990
	Blake Horvath	12	2025
5	Bill Byrne	11	1984
	Jim Kubiak	11	1993
	Chris McCoy	11	1997
8	Bill Byrne	10	1986
	Jim Kubiak	10	1994

Single game
Rank	Player	TDs	Year	Opponent
1	Tom Forrestal	4	1957	Pennsylvania

== Rushing ==
=== Rushing yards ===
Career
Rank	Player	Yards	Years
1	Keenan Reynolds	4,559	2012 2013 2014 2015
2	Malcolm Perry	4,354	2016 2017 2018 2019
3	Napoleon McCallum	4,179	1981 1982 1983 1984 1985
4	Chris McCoy	3,401	1995 1996 1997
5	Eddie Meyers	2,935	1978 1979 1980 1981
6	Kyle Eckel	2,900	2001 2002 2003 2004
7	Ricky Dobbs	2,665	2008 2009 2010
8	Blake Horvath	2,637	2023 2024 2025
9	Cleveland Cooper	2,582	1972 1973 1974
10	Shun White	2,311	2005 2006 2007 2008

Single season
Rank	Player	Yards	Year
1	Malcolm Perry	2,017	2019
2	Napoleon McCallum	1,587	1983
3	Zach Abey	1,413	2017
4	Keenan Reynolds	1,373	2015
5	Chris McCoy	1,370	1997
6	Keenan Reynolds	1,346	2013
7	Napoleon McCallum	1,327	1985
8	Eddie Meyers	1,318	1981
9	Joe Gattuso Jr.	1,292	1977

Single game
Rank	Player	Yards	Year	Opponent
1	Shun White	348	2008	Towson
2	Malcolm Perry	304	2019	Army
3	Eddie Meyers	298	1981	Syracuse
4	Malcolm Perry	282	2017	SMU
5	Eddie Meyers	278	1979	Army
6	Sneed Schmidt	277	1935	Columbia
	Keenan Reynolds	277	2014	Georgia Southern
8	Chris McCoy	273	1995	SMU
9	Chris McCoy	268	1997	Kent State
10	Keenan Reynolds	251	2014	San Jose State

=== Rushing touchdowns ===
Career
Rank	Player	TDs	Years
1	Keenan Reynolds	88	2012 2013 2014 2015
2	Ricky Dobbs	49	2008 2009 2010
3	Chris McCoy	43	1995 1996 1997
4	Malcolm Perry	40	2016 2017 2018 2019
5	Zach Abey	37	2016 2017 2018
6	Craig Candeto	33	2000 2001 2002 2003
	Blake Horvath	33	2023 2024 2025
8	Napoleon McCallum	31	1981 1982 1983 1984 1985
9	Kaipo-Noa Kaheaku-Enhada	26	2005 2006 2007 2008
	Will Worth	26	2013 2014 2015 2016

Single season
Rank	Player	TDs	Year
1	Keenan Reynolds	31	2013
2	Ricky Dobbs	27	2009
3	Will Worth	26	2016
4	Keenan Reynolds	24	2015
5	Keenan Reynolds	23	2014
6	Malcolm Perry	21	2019
7	Chris McCoy	20	1997
8	Zach Abey	19	2017
9	Blake Horvath	17	2024
10	Chris McCoy	16	1996
	Craig Candeto	16	2002
	Craig Candeto	16	2003
	Aaron Polanco	16	2004
	Blake Horvath	16	2025

Single game
Rank	Player	TDs	Year	Opponent
1	Keenan Reynolds	7	2013	San Jose State
2	Craig Candeto	6	2002	Army
	Keenan Reynolds	6	2014	Georgia Southern
4	Ricky Dobbs	5	2009	Delaware
	Keenan Reynolds	5	2015	East Carolina
	Zach Abey	5	2017	Virginia (Military Bowl)
	Jamale Carothers	5	2019	Houston
	Jackson Gutierrez	5	2026	Temple
9	14 times by 9 players	4	Most recent: Blake Horvath, 2025 vs. Florida Atlantic	

== Receiving ==
=== Receptions ===
Career
Rank	Player	Rec	Years
1	Rob Taylor	129	1965 1966 1967
2	Eli Heidenreich	109	2023 2024 2025
3	Bert Calland	108	1971 1972 1973
4	Kevin Hickman	107	1991 1992 1993 1994
5	Damon Dixon	102	1991 1992 1993 1994
6	Napoleon McCallum	96	1981 1982 1983 1984
7	Jason Van Matre	93	1990 1991 1992 1993
8	Jamir Tillman	91	2013 2014 2015 2016
9	Mark Stevens	88	1982 1983 1984
10	Larry Van Loan	83	1971 1972 1973

Single season
Rank	Player	Rec	Year
1	Rob Taylor	61	1967
	Bert Calland	61	1972
3	Jason Van Matre	59	1993
4	Rob Taylor	55	1996
5	Damon Dixon	51	1993
	Damon Dixon	51	1994
	Eli Heidenreich	51	2025
8	Jerry Dawson	46	1990
9	Chris Weiler	44	1984
	Napoleon McCallum	44	1985

Single game
Rank	Player	Rec	Year	Opponent
1	Rob Taylor	10	1967	Vanderbilt
	Rob Taylor	10	1967	William & Mary
	Rob Taylor	10	1967	Penn State
	Mike Clark	10	1967	Army
	Dave King	10	1976	Notre Dame
	Damon Dixon	10	1993	Virginia

=== Receiving yards ===
Career
Rank	Player	Yards	Years
1	Eli Heidenreich	1,994	2023 2024 2025
2	Rob Taylor	1,736	1965 1966 1967
3	Jamir Tillman	1,626	2013 2014 2015 2016
4	Phil McConkey	1,278	1976 1977 1978
5	Larry Van Loan	1,259	1971 1972 1973
6	Bert Calland	1,237	1971 1972 1973
7	Eric Roberts	1,213	2001 2002 2003 2004
8	Kevin Hickman	1,178	1991 1992 1993 1994
9	Damon Dixon	1,176	1991 1992 1993 1994
10	Karl Schwelm	1,174	1968 1969 1970

Single season
Rank	Player	Yards	Year
1	Eli Heidenreich	941	2025
2	Rob Taylor	818	1967
3	Rob Taylor	727	1966
4	Chris Weiler	711	1984
5	Eli Heidenreich	671	2024
6	Greg Jones	662	2010
7	Bert Calland	650	1972
8	Jerry Dawson	649	1990
9	Jamir Tillman	631	2016
10	Damon Dixon	620	1993

Single game
Rank	Player	Yards	Year	Opponent
1	Eli Heidenreich	243	2025	Air Force
2	Rob Taylor	179	1967	Vanderbilt
	Dave King	179	1976	Notre Dame

=== Receiving touchdowns ===
Career
Rank	Player	TDs	Years
1	Eli Heidenreich	16	2023 2024 2025
2	Rob Taylor	13	1965 1966 1967
	Phil McConkey	13	1976 1977 1978
4	Eric Roberts	10	2001 2002 2003 2004
	Jamir Tillman	10	2013 2014 2015 2016
6	Ken Heine	9	1982 1983 1984
	LeBron Butts	9	1995 1996 1997
8	Chris Weiler	8	1981 1982 1983 1984
	Reggie Campbell	8	2004 2005 2006 2007
	Brandon Turner	8	2010 2011 2012

Single season
Rank	Player	TDs	Year
1	Rob Taylor	6	1967
	Phil McConkey	6	1978
	Chris Weiler	6	1984
	Ryan Read	6	1998
	Eli Heidenreich	6	2024
	Eli Heidenreich	6	2025
7	Jerry Dawson	5	1990
	Eric Roberts	5	2003
	Greg Jones	5	2010
	Jamir Tillman	5	2015

Single game
Rank	Player	TDs	Year	Opponent
1	Harry Hurst	3	1957	Pennsylvania
	Ken Heine	3	1984	Lehigh
	Tony Hollinger	3	1985	Indiana
	Jerry Dawson	3	1990	Richmond
	Pat McGrew	3	1997	Colgate
	Eli Heidenreich	3	2025	Air Force

== Total offense ==
Total offense is the sum of passing and rushing statistics. It does not include receiving or returns.

=== Total offense yards ===
Career
Rank	Player	Yards	Years
1	Keenan Reynolds	8,290	2012 2013 2014 2015
2	Chris McCoy	5,887	1995 1996 1997
3	Alton Grizzard	5,666	1987 1988 1989 1990
4	Blake Horvath	5,654	2023 2024 2025
5	Jim Kubiak	5,498	1991 1992 1993 1994
6	Malcolm Perry	5,465	2016 2017 2018 2019
7	Ricky Dobbs	5,435	2008 2009 2010
8	John Cartwright	4,406	1965 1966 1967
9	Bill Byrne	4,399	1984 1985 1986
10	Craig Candeto	4,278	2000 2001 2002 2003

Single season
Rank	Player	Yards	Year
1	Malcolm Perry	3,099	2019
2	Blake Horvath	2,780	2025
3	Blake Horvath	2,607	2024
4	Will Worth	2,595	2016
5	Chris McCoy	2,573	1997
6	Jim Kubiak	2,496	1993
7	Ricky Dobbs	2,494	2010
8	Keenan Reynolds	2,403	2013
9	Keenan Reynolds	2,306	2015
10	Craig Candeto	2,252	2003

Single game
Rank	Player	Yards	Year	Opponent
1	Blake Horvath	469	2025	Air Force
2	Will Worth	428	2016	South Florida
3	Brian Broadwater	417	2000	Tulane
4	Blake Horvath	403	2024	Memphis

=== Touchdowns responsible for ===
"Touchdowns responsible for" is the NCAA's official term for combined passing and rushing touchdowns.

Career
Rank	Player	TDs	Years
1	Keenan Reynolds	115	2012 2013 2014 2015
2	Ricky Dobbs	69	2008 2009 2010
3	Chris McCoy	64	1995 1996 1997
4	Blake Horvath	60	2023 2024 2025
5	Malcolm Perry	50	2016 2017 2018 2019
6	Craig Candeto	48	2000 2001 2002 2003
7	Zach Abey	45	2016 2017 2018
8	Kaipo-Noa Kaheaku-Enhada	42	2005 2006 2007 2008
9	Roger Staubach	36	1962 1963 1964
10	Alton Grizzard	35	1987 1988 1989 1990

Single season
Rank	Player	TDs	Year
1	Keenan Reynolds	39	2013
2	Ricky Dobbs	33	2009
	Will Worth	33	2016
4	Chris McCoy	31	1997
5	Blake Horvath	30	2024
6	Keenan Reynolds	29	2014
7	Keenan Reynolds	28	2015
	Malcolm Perry	28	2019
	Blake Horvath	28	2025
10	Ricky Dobbs	27	2010

Single game
Rank	Player	TDs	Year	Opponent
1	Keenan Reynolds	8	2013	San Jose State

== Defense ==
=== Interceptions ===
Career
Rank	Player	Ints	Years
1	John Sturges	13	1974 1975 1976 1977
2	John Weaver	12	1952 1953 1954
	Rick Bayer	12	1965 1966 1967
4	Charlie Robinson	11	1971 1972 1973
5	Gene Ford	10	1973 1974 1975
	Sean Andrews	10	1995 1996 1997
	Dashaun Peele	10	2022 2023 2024

Single season
Rank	Player	Ints	Year
1	John Sturges	8	1977
	Sean Andrews	8	1995
3	John Weaver	7	1952
	Mike Galpin	7	1976
5	Gene Ford	6	1975

Single game
Rank	Player	Ints	Year	Opponent
1	John Weaver	4	1952	Columbia
	Mark Schickner	4	1970	Army

=== Tackles ===
Career
Rank	Player	Tackles	Years
1	Andy Ponseigo	500	1980 1981 1982 1983
2	Gervy Alota	384	1994 1995 1996 1997
3	Josh Smith	354	2002 2003 2004
4	Javier Zuluaga	337	1991 1992 1993
5	Marc Firlie	328	1984 1985 1986
6	Clint Bruce	328	1994 1995 1996

Single season
Rank	Player	Tackles	Year
1	Andy Ponseigo	169	1982
2	Vince McBeth	154	1986
3	Andy Ponseigo	152	1981
4	Mike Kronzer	148	1980
5	Chuck Voith	147	1970
6	Javier Zuluaga	146	1992
7	Javier Zuluaga	144	1993
8	Jeff Sapp	143	1976
9	Cody Peterson	142	2013
10	Rob Caldwell	140	2005

=== Sacks ===
Career
Rank	Player	Sacks	Years
1	Andy Person	22.0	1992 1993 1994 1995
2	David Mahoney	21.0	2003 2004 2005 2006
3	Tyler Tidwell	16.0	2004 2005 2006
4	Jabaree Tuani	16.0	2008 2009 2010 2011
5	Landon Robinson	14.5	2023 2024 2025

Single season
Rank	Player	Sacks	Year
1	John Marshall	11.5	2022
2	Tyler Tidwell	10.0	2005
3	Eric Rutherford	9.0	1984
4	Andy Person	8.0	1995
	Shaka Martin	8.0	1999
	David Mahoney	8.0	2005
	Jacob Springer	8.0	2019

== Kicking ==
=== Field goals made ===
Career
Rank	Player	FGs	Years
1	Steve Fehr	42	1979 1980 1981
2	Bijan Nichols	36	2019 2020 2021 2022
3	Matt Harmon	33	2005 2006 2007 2008
4	Bob Tata	30	1976 1977 1978
	Todd Solomon	30	1982 1983 1984 1985
6	Tom Vanderhorst	28	1995 1996 1997 1998

Single season
Rank	Player	FGs	Year
1	Matt Harmon	19	2008
2	Steve Fehr	18	1991
3	Steve Fehr	17	1980
	Tim Shubzda	17	1999
5	Todd Solomon	15	1984
	David Hills	15	2001
	Bijan Nichols	15	2021

Single game
Rank	Player	FGs	Year	Opponent
1	Bob Tata	4	1978	Boston College
	Steve Fehr	4	1980	Army
	Steve Fehr	4	1980	Georgia Tech
	Steve Fehr	4	1981	Boston College
	Tim Shubzda	4	1999	Army
	Matt Harmon	4	2008	Air Force
