= Will Worth =

American football player

No. 15
- Position: Quarterback

Personal information
- Born: Valrico, Florida, U.S.
- Listed height: 6 ft 1 in (1.85 m)
- Listed weight: 205 lb (93 kg)

Career information
- High school: Newsome (Lithia, Florida)
- College: Navy (2013–2016)
- Stats at ESPN

Will Worth is an American former college football player who was a quarterback for the Navy Midshipmen. As a senior in 2016, his lone season as a starter, he led Navy to a 9–2 record as he set multiple Navy career and season record.

== Early life ==
Worth graduated from Joe E. Newsome High School in 2013, where he received Florida All-State, All-Conference and All-County honors during his senior year. Throughout his high school football career he threw for 5,400 yards and 57 touchdowns and on defense records nearly 300 tackles.

== College career ==
=== 2013–2015 seasons ===
In his first three years at the United States Naval Academy, Worth only played 15 games, one freshman year, one sophomore year where he carried the ball twice for 10 yards and a touchdown. He was the holder for the Midshipmen during the 2015 season playing in all 13 games.

=== 2016 season (senior year) ===
In his senior year, Worth entered the first game against Fordham after an early second-quarter injury to starter Tago Smith, then started the next 11 games before being injured during the second quarter in the AAC championship game against Temple. After an early loss on the road to the Air Force Academy, Worth and Navy restored fans' hopes for a successful campaign by upsetting #6 nationally ranked University of Houston in Annapolis on October 8. In the 46–40 win, Worth ran for 115 yards (1 TD) and passed for 76 yards (2 TD, 0 INT). On October 22, Worth led the Midshipmen to a 42–28 home win over the Memphis Tigers, running for 201 yards (3 TD), while passing for 85 yards (2 TD, 0 INT). He had his second consecutive 5-TD game the following week, when he threw for 299 yards and 1 touchdown and rushed for 129 yards and 4 touchdowns in a narrow 52–45 road loss to the University of South Florida, a contest in which Navy trailed 28–0 after the 1st quarter and 45–21 entering the 4th quarter.

One week later, Worth led Navy to a 28–27 neutral-site victory over Notre Dame, the Midshipmen's first win over the Fighting Irish since 2010. In his penultimate game as a starter on November 26, he engineered a 75–31 road-game thrashing of Southern Methodist University, running for 107 yards (3 TD) and passing for 104 yards (1 TD, 0 INT), thus ensuring Navy's divisional championship in the AAC West. Worth's season came to an end when he broke his right foot during the second quarter of the 2016 American Athletic Conference Football Championship Game against Temple on December 3. He was replaced by Zach Abey, who then had his first career start in the Army–Navy Game.

Worth ended the 2016 season with 1,198 rushing yards and 25 rushing touchdowns (the fourth-most by a quarterback in NCAA history), along with 1,397 passing yards and 8 touchdown passes. Worth also scored a touchdown in eleven straight games, the second-best streak in Naval Academy history, while also setting school records for consecutive games with at least 100 rushing yards (seven), most 100-yard rushing games (eight), passing yards per attempt in a season (11.9), passing efficiency (179.3), and total offense (2,595).

Worth received various honors for his season, such as ECAC Player of the Year, the Washington Touchdown Club College Player of the Year, the Annapolis Touchdown Tony Rubino Silver Helmet Award, the American Sports Network's FBS Player of the Year, and other school awards like the Roger Staubach Award, the Cmdr. Ralph Sentmann Award, and the E.E. Rip Miller Award.

=== Statistics ===
Year	Team	Games	Games started	Record	Passing									Rushing				
Year	Team	Games	Games started	Record	Comp	Att	Yards	Avg	Lng	Pct.	TD	Int	QB rating	Att	Yards	Avg	Lng	TD
2013	Navy	0	0	0–0	0	0	0	--	--	--	0	0	--	0	0	--	--	0
2014	Navy	1	0	0–0	0	1	0	0	0.0	0	0	1	-200.0	3	10	3.3	7	1
2015	Navy	0	0	0–0	0	0	0	--	--	--	0	0	--	0	0	--	--	0
2016	Navy	12	12	9–3	72	117	1,397	11.9	57	61.5	8	3	179.3	265	1,196	4.5	60	25
Career		13	12	13–12	72	118	1,397	11.8	57	61.0	8	4	176.1	268	1,206	4.5	60	26

== After Navy ==
Upon graduating from the Naval Academy, Worth commissioned as a second lieutenant in the United States Marine Corps.

In 2017, he was inducted into the National Football Foundation and College Football Hall of Fame Hampshire Honor Society, which consists of players who have played extensive roles for their respective teams in addition to maintaining a grade point average of at least 3.2. Along with Air Force's Claude Alexander, Worth became one of only two service academy members to join the society.
