= William D. Byrne Jr. =

U.S. Navy admiral

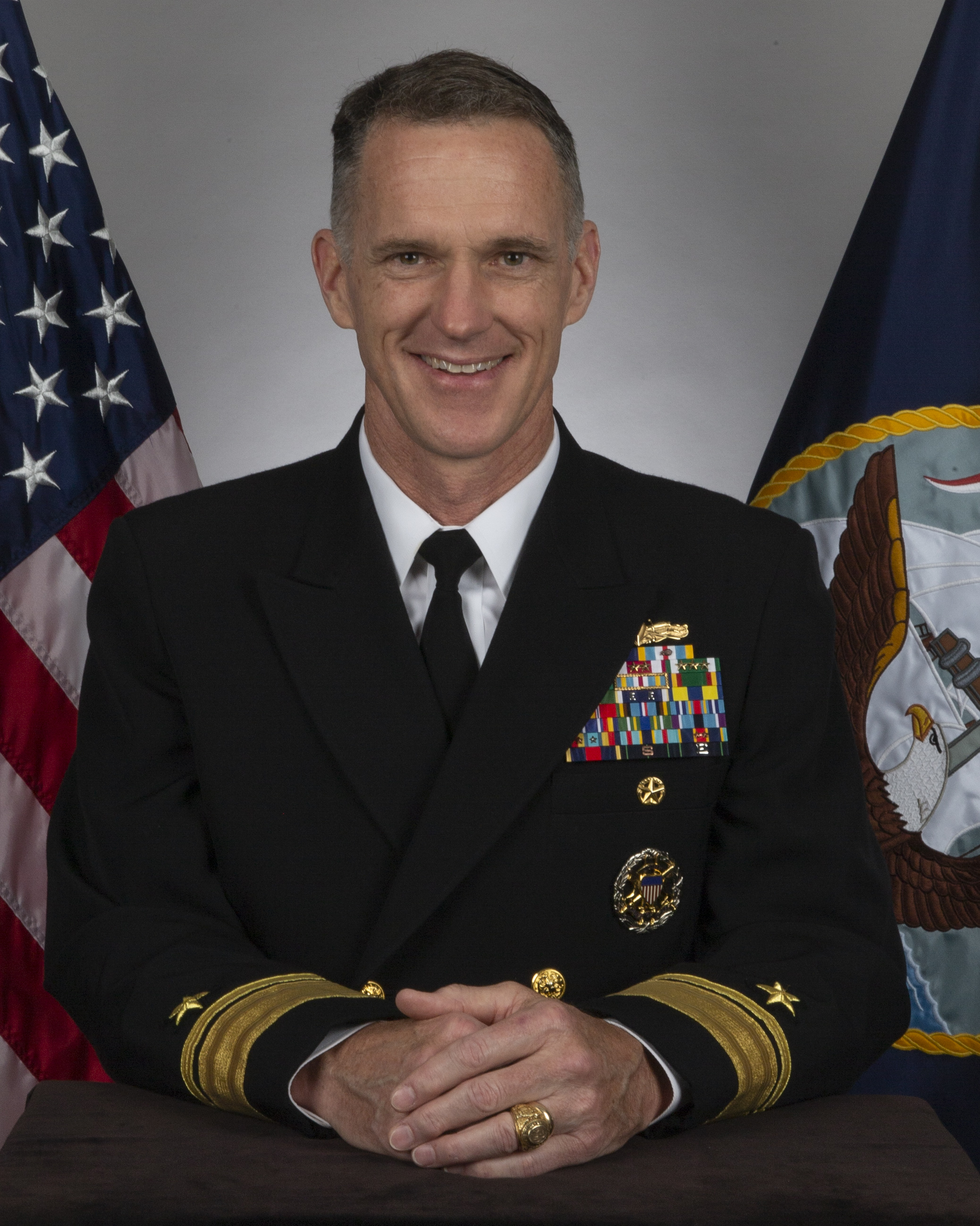
- Born: William Declan Byrne Jr. Pacifica, California, U.S.
- Spouse: Amy Donovan Byrne
- Military career
- Branch: United States Navy
- Service years: 1987–2022
- Rank: Rear Admiral
- Nickname: Bill
- Commands: U.S. Naval Forces Korea; Carrier Strike Group 11; Carrier Strike Group 15; USS Cape St. George; USS Halyburton
- Awards: Defense Superior Service Medal; Legion of Merit (5)

William Declan Byrne Jr. is a retired United States Navy rear admiral who last served as director of warfare development (N72) in the Office of the Chief of Naval Operations. He previously served as the vice director of the Joint Staff. Byrne also served as the 85th Commandant of Midshipmen of the United States Naval Academy from May 2013 to June 2015.

Byrne attended the United States Naval Academy, graduating in 1987 with a B.S. degree in political science. While there, he was a record-setting starting quarterback for three football seasons. Byrne later earned an M.S. degree in National Resource Strategy from the Industrial College of the Armed Forces in 2004.

== Awards and decorations ==

Surface Warfare Officer Pin
Defense Superior Service Medal
Legion of Merit with four gold award stars	Meritorious Service Medal with two award stars	Navy and Marine Corps Commendation Medal with three award stars
Navy and Marine Corps Achievement Medal	Joint Meritorious Unit Award	Navy Unit Commendation
Navy Meritorious Unit Commendation	Navy "E" Ribbon with two Wreathed Battle E devices	Navy Expeditionary Medal
National Defense Service Medal with one bronze service star	Armed Forces Expeditionary Medal	Global War on Terrorism Expeditionary Medal
Global War on Terrorism Service Medal	Korea Defense Service Medal	Humanitarian Service Medal
Navy Sea Service Deployment Ribbon with six service stars	Naval Reserve Sea Service Ribbon	Navy and Marine Corps Overseas Service Ribbon with two service stars
Navy Accession Training Service Ribbon	Order of National Security Merit, Cheonsu Medal (Korea)	Navy Expert Pistol Shot Ribbon
Command at Sea insignia
Office of the Joint Chiefs of Staff Identification Badge

In 2015, Byrne was selected as a co-recipient of the Distinguished American Award by the National Football Foundation and College Football Hall of Fame.

== See also ==
- Navy Midshipmen football statistical leaders

Military offices
Preceded by Patrick C. Rabun	Commanding Officer of USS Cape St. George (CG-71); 2009-2011	Succeeded by Donald D. Gabrielson
Preceded by Robert E. Clark II	Commandant of Midshipmen of the United States Naval Academy; 2013–2015	Succeeded by Stephen E. Liszewski
Preceded by Lisa Franchetti	Commander of United States Naval Forces Korea; 2015–2016	Succeeded by Charles B. Cooper II
Preceded by Richard A. Brown	Commander of the Carrier Strike Group 11; 2016–2017	Succeeded by Gregory N. Harris
Preceded by Ross A. Myers	Commander of Carrier Strike Group 15; 2017–2019	Succeeded by David Welch
Preceded by Glen D. VanHerck	Vice Director of the Joint Staff; 2019–2021	Succeeded by George M. Wikoff
Preceded by Glen D. VanHerck	Director of the Joint Staff; Acting; 2020	Succeeded by Andrew P. Poppas
Preceded by James S. Bynum	Assistant Deputy Chief of Naval Operations for Warfighting Development and Director of Warfare Integration of the United States Navy; 2021–2022	Succeeded by Paul J. Schlise
