= 2016 Navy Midshipmen football team =

American college football season

2016 Navy Midshipmen football

The American West Division champion

The American Championship, L 10–34 vs. Temple

Armed Forces Bowl, L 45–48 vs. Louisiana Tech
- Conference: American Athletic Conference
- West Division
- Record: 9–5 (7–1 AAC)
- Head coach: Ken Niumatalolo (9th season)
- Offensive coordinator: Ivin Jasper (9th season)
- Offensive scheme: Triple option
- Defensive coordinator: Dale Pehrson (1st season)
- Base defense: Multiple
- MVP: Will Worth
- Captains: Daniel Gonzales; Toneo Gulley
- Home stadium: Navy–Marine Corps Memorial Stadium

2016 American Athletic Conference football standings
	Conf.			Overall
Team	W		L	W		L
East Division
Temple xy$	7	–	1	10	–	4
No. 19 South Florida x	7	–	1	11	–	2
UCF	4	–	4	6	–	7
Cincinnati	1	–	7	4	–	8
UConn	1	–	7	3	–	9
East Carolina	1	–	7	3	–	9
West Division
Navy xy	7	–	1	9	–	5
Tulsa	6	–	2	10	–	3
Memphis	5	–	3	8	–	5
Houston	5	–	3	9	–	4
SMU	3	–	5	5	–	7
Tulane	1	–	7	4	–	8
Championship: Temple 34, Navy 10
$ – Conference champion; x – Division champion/co-champions; y – Championship game participant; Rankings from AP Poll

The 2016 Navy Midshipmen football team represented the United States Naval Academy in the 2016 NCAA Division I FBS football season. The Midshipmen were led by ninth-year head coach Ken Niumatalolo and played their home games at Navy–Marine Corps Memorial Stadium. The Midshipmen competed as a member of the West Division of the American Athletic Conference, and were second year members of the conference. They finished the season 9–5 overall and 7–1 in American Athletic play to be champions of the West Division. They represented the West Division in The American Athletic Championship Game where they lost to Temple. They were invited to the Armed Forces Bowl where they lost to Louisiana Tech.

== Before the season ==
=== Spring practices ===
Navy held spring practices during March and April 2016.

== Schedule ==
Date	Time	Opponent	Rank	Site	TV	Result	Attendance
September 3	12:00 p.m.	Fordham*		Navy–Marine Corps Memorial Stadium; Annapolis, MD	CBSSN	W 52–16	28,238
September 10	3:30 p.m.	UConn		Navy–Marine Corps Memorial Stadium; Annapolis, MD	CBSSN	W 28–24	31,501
September 17	7:00 p.m.	at Tulane		Yulman Stadium; New Orleans, LA	ASN	W 21–14	21,503
October 1	3:30 p.m.	at Air Force*		Falcon Stadium; Colorado Springs, CO (Commander-in-Chief's Trophy)	CBSSN	L 14–28	43,063
October 8	3:30 p.m.	No. 6 Houston		Navy–Marine Corps Memorial Stadium; Annapolis, MD	CBSSN	W 46–40	34,531
October 22	3:30 p.m.	Memphis^{†}	No. 24	Navy–Marine Corps Memorial Stadium; Annapolis, MD	CBSSN	W 42–28	35,943
October 28	7:00 p.m.	at South Florida	No. 22	Raymond James Stadium; Tampa, FL	ESPN2	L 45–52	31,824
November 5	11:30 a.m.	vs. Notre Dame*		EverBank Field; Jacksonville, FL (rivalry)	CBS	W 28–27	62,246
November 12	12:00 p.m.	Tulsa		Navy–Marine Corps Memorial Stadium; Annapolis, MD	CBSSN	W 42–40	36,397
November 19‡	4:00 p.m.	at East Carolina		Dowdy–Ficklen Stadium; Greenville, NC	ESPNews	W 66–31	39,480
November 26	3:30 p.m.	at SMU	No. 25	Gerald J. Ford Stadium; Dallas, TX (Gansz Trophy)	ESPNU	W 75–31	21,283
December 3	12:00 p.m.	Temple	No. 19	Navy–Marine Corps Memorial Stadium; Annapolis, MD (The American Championship)	ABC	L 10–34	22,815
December 10	3:00 p.m.	vs. Army*	No. 25	M&T Bank Stadium; Baltimore, MD (Army–Navy Game), College GameDay)	CBS	L 17–21	71,600
December 23	4:30 p.m.	vs. Louisiana Tech*	No. 25	Amon G. Carter Stadium; Fort Worth, TX (Armed Forces Bowl)	ESPN	L 45–48	40,542
*Non-conference game; ^{†}Homecoming; Rankings from AP Poll and CFP Rankings after November 1 released prior to game; All times are in Eastern time

Note: ‡ Game at East Carolina was originally scheduled for Thursday, October 13, but was postponed due to flooding from Hurricane Matthew; it was rescheduled to Saturday, November 19.

== Personnel ==
=== Coaching staff ===
Name	Position	Seasons at Navy	Alma mater
Ken Niumatalolo	Head coach	18	Hawaii (1989)
Ivin Jasper	Offensive Coordinator / quarterbacks coach	17	Hawaii (1994)
Dale Pehrson	Defensive Coordinator / defensive line coach	21	Utah (1976)
Chris Culton	Offensive Line coach	14	Georgia Southern (2011)
Justin Davis	Outside Linebackers coach	10	Maine (2001)
Lt. Col. Robert Green, USMC	Outside Linebackers coach	4	Navy (1998)
Ashley Ingram	Running Game Coordinator / offensive line coach	9	North Alabama (1996)
Steve Johns	Inside Linebackers	9	Occidental College (1991)
Dan O'Brien	Secondary coach	3	Boston College (2005)
Mike Judge	Fullbacks coach	9	Springfield College (2005)
Shaun Nua	Defensive Line coach	5	BYU (2005)
Danny O'Rourke	Special Teams Coordinator / Slotbacks coach	15	West Georgia (2000)
Napoleon Sykes	Defensive Line coach	3	Wake Forest (2006)
Mick Yokitis	Wide Receivers coach	6	Hawaii (2006)

=== Roster ===
2016 Navy Midshipmen football team roster
Quarterbacks: 1 Jonah Llanusa – freshman (6'1, 205); 2 Tago Smith – senior (5'10, 201) (injured); 3 Jacob Harrison – freshman (6'1, 210); 5 Malcolm Perry – freshman (5'9, 185); 6 Jon Jon Roberts – freshman (5'8, 170) (+SB); 7 Garret Lewis – sophomore (6'1, 200); 9 Zach Abey – sophomore (6'2, 218); 11 Troy Thompson – senior (5'11, 190); 15 Will Worth – senior (6'1, 205) (injured); Slotbacks: 2 (22)* Toeno gulley – senior (5'8, 196) (C); 8 Mazh Maloy – freshman (5'7, 170); 10 Travis Brannan – freshman (6'0, 180); 20 Calvin Cass Jr. – senior (5'10, 206); 21 Tre Walker – sophomore (5'9, 190); 23 Kendrick Mouton – senior (6'0, 200); 24 Joshua Walker – junior (5'11, 210); 25 Jahmaal Daniel – junior (5'6, 160); 26 James Munson – junior (5'8, 160); 28 Dishan Romine – senior (5'11, 178); 29 Darry Bonner – junior (5'7, 171); 35 John Brown III – junior (5'9, 203); 40 Cameron Dudeck – sophomore (5'9, 195); 42 Josh Brown – junior (5'9, 189); 46 Travis Pospisil – sophomore (5'10, 198); 48 Amari DuBose – freshman (5'9, 165); Fullbacks: 31 Shawn White – senior (6'1, 255); 32 Myles Swain – senior (5'11, 223); 33 Chris High – junior (6'0, 224); 34 Mike Martin – sophomore (6'1, 195); 36 Jalen Wade – senior (6'1, 229); 38 Anthony Gargiulo – sophomore (6'2, 251); 39 Akili Taylor – sophomore (5'7, 191); 44 Myles Benning – freshman (5'11, 235); 45 Bryan Hammond – sophomore (5'10, 200); Wide receivers: 4 Jamir Tillman – senior (6'3, 212); 11 Darian Pride – freshman (6'3, 200); 13 Conrey Meagher – junior (5'10, 202); 37 Tory Delmonico – sophomore (6'2, 225); 47 Trey Olsen – junior (6'4, 232); 49 Jordan Pittman – junior (6'2, 227); 80 Terrence Laster – junior (6'1, 224); 81 Trayvon Clarke – sophomore (6'1, 210); 82 Craig Scott – junior (6'2, 189); 83 Zack Fraade – freshman (6'3, 215); 84 Chad Lewellyn – junior (6'4, 195); 86 Julian Turner – senior (6'2, 190); 87 Brandon Colon – junior (6'4, 223); 88 Tyler Carmona – junior (6'4, 222); 89 Taylor Jackson – sophomore (6'3, 210); Placekickers: 16 Bennett Moehring – sophomore (5'9, 180); 41 D.J. Grant-Johnson – senior (6'3, 216); 97 J.R. Osborn – freshman (6'0, 190); 98 Owen White – freshman (5'10, 180) (+P)	Offensive linemen: 50 Eric Cal – OG – freshman (6'3, 288); 52 Nick Czar – OG – sophomore (6'3, 273); 54 Kyle-Malik Mitchell – OG – freshman (6'2, 310); 55 Mike Adzima – OT – freshman (6'2, 282); 56 Niko Yaramus – OG – freshman (6'3, 282); 57 Jake Hawk – OG – sophomore (6'6, 312); 58 T.J. Salu – C – freshman (6'2, 300); 59 Isaac Willis – C – freshman (6'0, 277); 60 Nofo Tii – OG – sophomore (6'1, 318); 61 Andrew Wood – OT – sophomore (6'4, 300); 62 Parker Wade – C – junior (6'2, 271); 63 Seth White – OG – junior (6'3, 274); 64 Steve Satchell – OG – sophomore (6'4, 256); 65 Garrett Wiedle – OT – sophomore (6'5, 267); 66 Brett Leake – OT – freshman (6'3, 275); 66 Jeremiah Robbins – OG – senior (6'2, 295); 67 Chris Gesell – OG – sophomore (6'4, 295); 68 Jackson Mitchell – OT – sophomore (6'5, 278); 69 Adam Amosa-Tagovailoa – OT – sophomore (6'2, 268); 70 Wes Mehl – OG – freshman (6'4, 300); 70 Maurice Morris – C – senior (6'2, 327); 71 Jude Hydrick – OT – freshman (6'3, 250); 71 Evan Martin – OG – junior (6'3, 294); 72 David Shin – OG – freshman (6'1, 298); 72 Adam West – OG – senior (6'3, 297); 73 Michael Raiford – OT – junior (6'6, 300); 74 Alec Keener – OT – sophomore (6'4, 265); 75 Logan Lister – OT – freshman (6'5, 285); 75 Ford Higgins – OT – freshman (6'2, 250); 75 Robert Lindsey – OG – junior (6'4, 274); 76 Kendel Wright – OT – freshman (6'4, 290); 77 Bryan Barrett – C – sophomore (6'3, 324); 77 David Forney – C – freshman (6'3, 305); 78 Laurent Njiki – OG – sophomore (6'3, 295); 79 Blake Copeland – OT – senior (6'4, 281); Defensive linemen: 52 Amos Mason – DE – senior (6'1, 266); 60 Lance Angulo – NG – sophomore (6'2, 285); 62 Buck Elliott – DE – sophomore (6'4, 259); 63 Joshua Van Dunk – DE – freshman (6'3, 285); 65 Carter Bankston – DE – freshman (6'3, 230); 67 Dave Tolentino – NG – freshman (6'2, 290); 68 Patrick Forrestal – NG – senior (6'4, 305); 69 Marcus Edwards – NG – freshman (6'4, 305); 70 Mack Nash – DE – freshman (6'5, 235); 71 Corbin Heyward – DE – freshman (6'3, 280); 74 Rob Dusz – NG – senior (6'0, 287); 90 Jarvis Polu – DE – sophomore (6'3, 280); 91 Tyler Sayles – DE – junior (6'2, 255); 92 Josh Webb – DE – sophomore (6'5, 250); 93 Joe Goff – DE – freshman (6'5, 270); 95 Anthony Villalobos – DE – sophomore (6'2, 266); 96 Nizaire Cromatie – DE – freshman (6'2, 250); 97 Nnamdi Uzoma – DE – senior (6'3, 251); 98 Dylan Fischer – NG – junior (6'2, 307); 99 Jackson Pittman – NG – freshman (6'3, 315); Punters: 18 Alex Barta – senior (6'3, 213); 43 Erik Harris – sophomore (5'10, 184)	Linebackers: 2 (58*) Daniel Gonzales – senior (6'2, 240) (C) (injured); 3 Brandon Jones – OLB – junior (6'4, 225); 5 Justin Norton – OLB – junior (6'2, 190); 22 OJ Davis – OLB – freshman (6'2, 225); 23 Sion Harrington – OLB – freshman (6'3, 210); 24 Dre Williamson – OLB – sophomore (6'4, 208); 28 Travis Kerchner – OLB – sophomore (6'2, 200); 31 Vic Thomas – OLB – freshman (6'4, 240); 32 Denzel Polk – OLB – freshman (6'2, 250); 33 Tony Masaniai – freshman (6'1, 250); 36 Forrest Forte – OLB – sophomore (6'1, 194); 38 Rahn Bailey – OLB – freshman (6'2, 230); 39 Jake Onstott – freshman (6'2, 215); 40 Kevin McCoy – OLB – junior (6'4, 212); 41 Tyler Pistorio – freshman (6'2, 215); 43 Jake Schwarzer – freshman (6'1, 218); 44 Micah Thomas – junior (6'1, 249); 45 D.J. Palmore – OLB – junior (6'3, 236); 46 Conner Dorris – sophomore (6'2, 245); 47 Matt Stewart – sophomore (6'1, 220); 58 (48*) Josiah Powell – OLB – senior (6'3, 224); 49 Mike Kelly – senior (6'1, 230); 50 Monte Armstrong – OLB – sophomore (6'1, 222); 51 Winn Howard – junior (6'2, 216); 53 Hudson Sullivan – sophomore (6'2, 220); 54 Taylor Heflin – sophomore (6'2, 230); 55 Ted Colburn – OLB – senior (6'3, 230); 56 Myles Davenport – OLB – junior (6'2, 233); 59 Ryan Harris – senior (5'11, 213); 64 Zack Quilty – OLB – freshman (6'3, 210); 80 Aleksei Yaramus – freshman (6'2, 205); 87 Paul Carothers – freshman (6'1, 225); Defensive backs: 1 Alohi Gilman – S – freshman (6'0, 200); 2 Elijah Jones – CB – sophomore (5'11, 186); 4 John Gillis – CB – sophomore (5'11, 170); 6 Sean Williams – S – sophomore (6'1, 190); 7 Khaylan Williams – S – sophomore (6'0, 192); 8 Randy Beggs – S – junior (6'0, 180); 9 Jarid Ryan – CB – sophomore (5'11, 203); 10 Cameron Bryant – CB – senior (5'10, 186); 11 Jerry Thompson – S – junior (6'0, 196); 13 Kyle Battle – S – senior (6'1, 190); 14 Elijah Merchant – CB – junior (5'10, 196); 15 Noruwa Obanor – CB – freshman (6'1, 195); 16 Jeremy Griffis – CB – freshman (5'9, 178); 17 Tyris Wooten – CB – junior (6'1, 180); 18 Isaac Wright – S – junior (5'10, 178); 20 Elan Nash – S – freshman (5'11, 190); 21 Walter Little – S – freshman (5'11, 200); 25 Mason Plante – CB – freshman (5'11, 195); 26 Daiquan Thomason – S – senior (6'0, 205); 29 Brady Petersen – S – sophomore (5'10, 190); 37 Juan Halley – CB – sophomore (6'1, 196); Long snappers: 85 Ronnie Querry – junior (6'1, 208); 94 Josh Antol – senior (6'1, 214); 96 Michael Pifer – freshman (6'3, 226)
(C) Team Captain; (S) Suspended; (I) Ineligible; Injured; Redshirt; Note: Captains Toeno Gulley (#22) and Daniel Gonzalez (#58) switched their jersey numbers to #2 in honor of their starting quarterback Tago Smith who sustained a season-ending injury. Joshua Powell (#48) switched his jersey number to #58 after Daniel Gonzalez also sustained a season-ending injury.

=== Depth chart ===
Defense

FS
Daiquan Thomasson
Khaylan Williams
Kyle Battle

WLB	ILB	ILB	SLB
D.J. Palmore	Daniel Gonzales	Micah Thomas	Josiah Powell
Ted Colburn	Winn Howard	Mike Kelly	Brandon Jones
Monte Armstrong	Taylor Heflin	Hudson Sullivan	Justin Norton

SS
Sean Williams
Alohi Gilman
Jerry Thompson

CB
Elijah Merchant
Jarid Ryan
Cameron Bryant

DE	NT	DE
Amos Mason	Patrick Forrestal	Jarvis Polu
Nnamdi Uzoma	Jackson Pittman	Tyler Sayles
Anthony Villalobos	Rob Dusz	Nizaire Cromartie

CB
Tyris Wooten
Noruwa Obanor
Juan Hailey

Offense

WR
Jamir Tillman
Brandon Colon
Terrence Laster

SB
Dishan Romine
Tre Walker
Joshua Walker

LT	LG	C	RG	RT
Blake Copeland	Adam West	Maurice Morris	Evan Martin	Andrew Wood
Adam Amosa-Tagovailo	Laurent Njiki	Parker Wade	Laurent Njiki	Jake Hawk
Michael Raiford	Jeremiah Robbins	David Forney	Steve Satchell	Seth White

SB
Toneo Gulley
Calvin Cass Jr.
Darry Bonner

WR
Craig Scott
Tyler Carmona
Taylor Jackson

QB
Will Worth
Zach Abey
Malcolm Perry

Key reserves

FB
Chris High
Myles Swain
Shawn White

Special teams
PK Bennett Moehring
P Alex Barta
KR Dishan Romine & Tre Walker
PR Craig Scott & Calvin Cass Jr.
LS Josh Antol
H Will Worth

Depth Chart 2016
True Freshman
Double Position : *

== Rankings ==
Ranking movements Legend: ██ Increase in ranking ██ Decrease in ranking — = Not ranked RV = Received votes
	Week															
Poll	Pre	1	2	3	4	5	6	7	8	9	10	11	12	13	14	Final
AP	RV	RV	—	—	—	—	25	24	22	—	RV	RV	RV	20	RV	RV
Coaches	RV	RV	RV	RV	RV	—	RV	25	22	RV	RV	RV	RV	20	RV	RV
CFP	Not released									—	—	—	25	19	25	Not released

== Game summaries ==
=== Fordham ===
Team	1	2	3	4	Total
Fordham	10	0	3	3	16
• Navy	21	14	14	3	52

- Date: September 3, 2016
- Location: Navy–Marine Corps Memorial Stadium, Annapolis, Maryland
- Game start: 12:02 pm EST
- Elapsed time: 3 hours 32 minutes
- Game attendance: 28,238
- Game weather: Temp: 73 F • Wind: ENE 20 MPH • Weather: Partly Cloudy
- Referee: Henry Wimberg
- TV announcers (CBS Sports Network): John Sadak, Randy Cross, and Sheehan Stanwick Burch (sideline)

=== UConn ===
Team	1	2	3	4	Total
UConn	0	7	14	3	24
• Navy	7	14	0	7	28

- Date: September 10, 2016
- Location: Navy–Marine Corps Memorial Stadium, Annapolis, Maryland
- Game start: 3:32 pm EST
- Elapsed time: 3 hours 8 minutes
- Game attendance: 31,501
- Game weather: Temp: 86 F • Wind: SE 12 MPH • Weather: Clear
- Referee: Adam Savoie
- TV announcers (CBS Sports Network): John Sadak, Randy Cross, and Sheehan Stanwick Burch (sideline)

=== At Tulane ===
Team	1	2	3	4	Total
• Navy	0	7	6	8	21
Tulane	0	7	7	0	14

- Date: September 17, 2016
- Location: Yulman Stadium, New Orleans
- Game start: 7:06 pm EST
- Elapsed time: 2 hours 57 minutes
- Game attendance: 21,503
- Game weather: Temp: 80 F • Wind: SSW 13 MPH • Weather: Cloudy
- Referee: Rick Lourniet
- TV announcers (ASN): Mike Gleason, Derrick Lewis, and Kathryn Pielech

=== At Air Force ===
Team	1	2	3	4	Total
Navy	0	0	0	14	14
• Air Force	0	3	14	11	28

- Date: October 1, 2016
- Location: Falcon Stadium, Colorado Springs, Colorado
- Game start: 3:37 pm EST
- Elapsed time: 3 hours 11 minutes
- Game attendance: 43,063
- Game weather: Temp: • Wind: • Weather: Clear
- Referee: Mike Roch
- TV announcers (CBS Sports Network): Carter Blackburn, Aaron Taylor, and Jenny Dell (sideline)

=== Houston ===
Team	1	2	3	4	Total
#6 Houston	10	10	7	13	40
• Navy	10	10	21	5	46

- Date: October 8, 2016
- Location: Navy–Marine Corps Memorial Stadium, Annapolis, Maryland
- Game start: 3:10 pm EST
- Elapsed time: 3 hours 38 minutes
- Game attendance: 34,531
- Game weather: Temp: 68 F • Wind: NNE 5–10 MPH • Weather: Cloudy, Rain
- Referee: Adam Savoie
- TV announcers (CBS Sports Network): John Sadak, Randy Cross, and Sheehan Stanwick Burch (sideline)

This game marked Navy Midshipmen's biggest upset victory facing a top-10 ranked opponent in 32 years. (Since 1984 as they won against #2 ranked South Carolina) The game marked Ken Niumatalolo's 4th win over a ranked team.

=== Memphis ===
Team	1	2	3	4	Total
Memphis	14	0	7	7	28
• #24 Navy	14	7	14	7	42

- Date: October 22, 2016
- Location: Navy–Marine Corps Memorial Stadium, Annapolis, Maryland
- Game start: 3:37 pm EST
- Elapsed time: 3 hours 29 minutes
- Game attendance: 35,943
- Game weather: Temp: 54 F • Wind: NW 25 MPH • Weather: Clear
- Referee: Michael Roche
- TV announcers (CBS Sports Network): John Sadak, Randy Cross, and Sheehan Stanwick Burch (sideline)

With this victory, Navy has 14th straight home wins, making it the 3rd longest active streak in FBS history. Also their longest at Navy-Marine Stadium since it opened in 1959. Personal player highlights include: wide receiver Jamir Tillman became the 2nd all-time receiver in Naval Academy history with 1,281 career receiving yards, passing Phil McConkey. And quarterback Will Worth had career highs with 201 rushing yards (286 total yards) and 5 touchdowns.

=== At South Florida ===
Team	1	2	3	4	Total
#22 Navy	0	14	7	24	45
• South Florida	28	14	3	7	52

- Date: October 28, 2016
- Location: Raymond James Stadium, Tampa, Florida
- Game start: 7:02 pm EST
- Elapsed time: 3 hours 38 minutes
- Game attendance: 31,824
- Game weather: Temp: 80 F • Wind: ENE 11 MPH • Weather: Partly Cloudy
- Referee: Tracy Jones
- TV announcers (ESPN2): Adam Amin, Mack Brown, and Molly McGrath (sideline)

=== Vs. Notre Dame ===
Team	1	2	3	4	Total
Notre Dame	10	7	7	3	27
• Navy	7	7	7	7	28

- Date: November 5, 2016
- Location: EverBank Field, Jacksonville, Florida
- Game start: 11:40 am EST
- Elapsed time: 3 hours 5 minutes
- Game attendance: 62,246
- Game weather: Temp: 70 F • Wind: ENE 13 MPH • Weather: Partly Cloudy
- Referee: J. Magallanes
- TV announcers (CBS): Carter Blackburn, Adam Archuleta, and Jenny Dell (sideline)

With this rare victory, Navy beat Notre Dame for only the 4th time in 52 years (1963) in the nation's longest-running intersectional rivalry since 1926 (the 90th year). The Fighting Irish previously won five in a row against the Midshipmen. Navy coach Ken Niumatalolo got this 3rd win over Notre Dame, tying former Navy coach Wayne Hardin from the 1960s, and handing the Fighting Irish their 14th losing season ever. Navy quarterback Will Worth ran for 175 yards with two touchdowns, making it his 9th consecutive game with a rushing score. Worth finished with his 4th straight 100-yard rushing performance (his 5th of the season).

=== Tulsa ===
Team	1	2	3	4	Total
Tulsa	10	10	7	13	40
• Navy	14	14	0	14	42

- Date: November 12, 2016
- Location: Navy–Marine Corps Memorial Stadium, Annapolis, Maryland
- Game start: 12:02 pm EST
- Elapsed time: 3 hours 25 minutes
- Game attendance: 36,397
- Game weather: Temp: 47 F • Wind: NNE 10 MPH • Weather: Sunny
- Referee: Charles Lamertina
- TV announcers (CBS Sports Network): John Sadak, Randy Cross, and Sheehan Stanwick Burch (sideline)

After this win, Navy has 15 straight home victories, making it the second longest winning streak in the FBS. Navy also has the winningest Senior Class in Naval Academy history with 36–13, tying the all-time program record with the class of 1909 (36–7–5) and the class of 2016 (36–16). And 14 straight Senior Day victories. The Midshipmen stand alone in the Western Division in the American Conference. Personal highlights include Navy wide receiver Jamir Tillman who moved to second place on Navy's career receiving yards leaders list with 1,454 catches, passing Phil McConkey with 1,278 catches.

=== At East Carolina ===
Team	1	2	3	4	Total
• Navy	7	24	21	14	66
East Carolina	14	3	14	0	31

- Date: November 19, 2016
- Location: Dowdy–Ficklen Stadium, Greenville, North Carolina
- Game start: 4:02 pm EST
- Elapsed time: 3 hours 18 minutes
- Game attendance: 39,480
- Game weather: Temp: 74 F • Wind: W 14 MPH • Weather: Mostly Clear
- Referee: Tracy Jones
- TV announcers (ESPNEWS): Kevin Brown and Al Groh

With this win, Navy clinched the AAC West division title, and will move on to the AAC championship game in only their second year in the conference. They also set some school record season highs; highest point total (66), most rushing touchdowns (9), and rushing yards (456). Personal highlights include Navy quarterback Will Worth becoming just the 5th player in school history with 1,000+ rushing and passing yards in a season. And six straight 100 yard games, ten with a rushing touchdown, which is the longest active streak in the FBS. Worth is tied with Jeremy McNichols from Boise State with 22 rushing touchdowns.

=== At SMU ===
Team	1	2	3	4	Total
• Navy	14	14	28	19	75
SMU	7	17	0	7	31

- Date: November 26, 2016
- Location: Gerald J. Ford Stadium, Dallas
- Game start: 3:39 pm EST
- Elapsed time: 3 hours 11 minutes
- Game attendance: 21,283
- Game weather: Temp: 63 F • Wind: SE 4 MPH • Weather: Partly Cloudy
- Referee: Michael Roche
- TV announcers (ESPNU): Kevin Brown and Clint Stoemer

=== Temple ===
2016 American Athletic Conference Football Championship Game

Team	1	2	3	4	Total
• Temple	14	10	0	10	34
#20 Navy	0	3	7	0	10

- Date: December 3, 2016
- Location: Navy–Marine Corps Memorial Stadium, Annapolis, Maryland
- Game start: 12:09 pm EST
- Elapsed time: 3 hours 8 minutes
- Game attendance: 22,815
- Game weather: Temp: 48 F • Wind: WNW 16 MPH • Weather: Clear, Sunny, Wind Gusts
- Referee: Michael Roche
- TV announcers (ABC): Joe Tessitore, Todd Blackledge, and Holly Rowe (sideline)

This game marked the first game, after 136 years of being independent, that Navy was in a conference championship.

=== Vs. Army ===
Army–Navy Game

Team	1	2	3	4	Total
• Army	7	7	0	7	21
Navy	0	0	10	7	17

- Date: December 10, 2016
- Location: M&T Bank Stadium, Baltimore
- Game start: 3:12 pm EST
- Elapsed time: 3 hours 3 minutes
- Game attendance: 71,600
- Game weather: Temp: 36 F • Wind: W 11 MPH • Weather: Sunny
- Referee: Stuart Mullins
- TV announcers (CBS): Verne Lundquist, Gary Danielson, and Allie LaForce

=== Louisiana Tech (Armed Forces Bowl) ===
Armed Forces Bowl

Team	1	2	3	4	Total
• LA Tech	17	14	0	17	48
Navy	7	17	7	14	45

- Date: December 23, 2016
- Location: Amon G. Carter Stadium, Fort Worth, Texas
- Game start: 4:30 pm EST
- Elapsed time: 3 hours 36 minutes
- Game attendance: 40,452
- Game weather: Temp: 49 F • Wind: S 3 MPH • Weather: Cloudy, Rainy
- Referee: Larry Smith
- TV announcers (ESPN/RedVoice): Roy Philpott, Tom Ramsey, and Kris Budden (sideline)/Brian Estridge, John Denton, and Landry Burdine
