= 2014 Navy Midshipmen football team =

American college football season

2014 Navy Midshipmen football
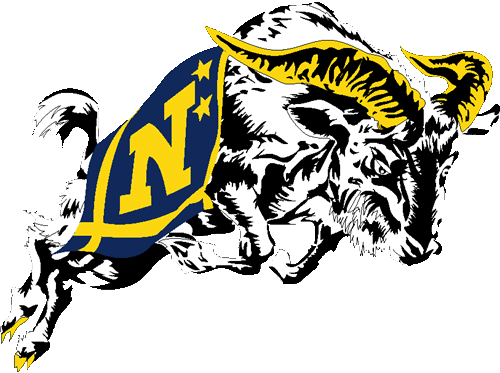

Poinsettia Bowl champion

Poinsettia Bowl, W 17–16 vs. San Diego State
- Conference: Independent
- Record: 8–5
- Head coach: Ken Niumatalolo (7th season)
- Offensive coordinator: Ivin Jasper (7th season)
- Offensive scheme: Triple option
- Defensive coordinator: Buddy Green (13th season)
- Base defense: Multiple
- MVP: Keenan Reynolds
- Captains: Noah Copeland; Parrish Gaines
- Home stadium: Navy–Marine Corps Memorial Stadium

2014 NCAA Division I FBS independents football records
	Conf.			Overall
Team	W		L	W		L
BYU		–		8	–	5
Notre Dame		–		8	–	5
Navy		–		8	–	5
Army		–		4	–	8
Rankings from AP Poll

The 2014 Navy Midshipmen football team represented the United States Naval Academy as an independent in the 2014 NCAA Division I FBS football season. The Midshipmen were led by seventh year head coach Ken Niumatalolo and played their home games at Navy–Marine Corps Memorial Stadium. This was the final year as an Independent before the school joins the American Athletic Conference. They finished the season 8–5. They were invited to the Poinsettia Bowl where they defeated San Diego State.

== Schedule ==
Date	Time	Opponent	Site	TV	Result	Attendance
August 30	12:00 p.m.	vs. No. 5 Ohio State	M&T Bank Stadium; Baltimore, MD	CBSSN	L 17–34	57,579
September 6	1:00 p.m.	at Temple	Lincoln Financial Field; Philadelphia, PA	ESPN3	W 31–24	28,408
September 13	8:00 p.m.	at Texas State	Bobcat Stadium; San Marcos, TX	ESPNews	W 35–21	32,007
September 20	3:30 p.m.	Rutgers^{†}	Navy–Marine Corps Memorial Stadium; Annapolis, MD	CBSSN	L 24–31	33,655
September 27	3:30 p.m.	Western Kentucky	Navy–Marine Corps Memorial Stadium; Annapolis, MD	CBSSN	L 27–36	30,537
October 4	3:30 p.m.	at Air Force	Falcon Stadium; Colorado Springs, CO (Commander-in-Chief's Trophy)	CBSSN	L 21–30	37,731
October 11	3:30 p.m.	VMI	Navy–Marine Corps Memorial Stadium; Annapolis, MD	CBSSN	W 51–14	33,812
October 25	1:00 p.m.	San Jose State	Navy–Marine Corps Memorial Stadium; Annapolis, MD	CBSSN	W 41–31	30,612
November 1	8:00 p.m.	vs. No. 6 Notre Dame	FedExField; Landover, MD (rivalry)	CBS	L 39–49	36,807
November 15	3:30 p.m.	Georgia Southern	Navy–Marine Corps Memorial Stadium; Annapolis, MD	CBSSN	W 52–19	33,894
November 28	3:00 p.m.	at South Alabama	Ladd–Peebles Stadium; Mobile, AL	ESPN3	W 42–40	14,571
December 13	3:00 p.m.	vs. Army	M&T Bank Stadium; Baltimore, MD (Army–Navy Game, College GameDay)	CBS	W 17–10	70,935
December 23	9:30 p.m.	at San Diego State	Qualcomm Stadium; San Diego, CA (Poinsettia Bowl)	ESPN	W 17–16	33,077
^{†}Homecoming; Rankings from AP Poll released prior to the game; All times are in Eastern time

== Before the season ==
=== Spring practices ===
Navy held spring practices during March and April 2014.

== Game summaries ==
=== Ohio State ===
Team	1	2	3	4	Total
• #5 Ohio State	3	3	14	14	34
Navy	0	7	7	3	17

- Date: August 30, 2014
- Location: M&T Bank Stadium, Baltimore, Maryland
- Game start: 12:00 pm
- Game attendance: 57,573
- Game weather: Temp: • Wind: • Weather:
- TV announcers (CBSSN): Verne Lundquist, Gary Danielson, & Allie LaForce

=== At Temple ===
Team	1	2	3	4	Total
• Navy	10	7	14	0	31
Temple	7	7	3	7	24

- Date: September 6, 2014
- Location: Lincoln Financial Field, Philadelphia
- Game start: 1:00 pm
- Game attendance: 28,408
- Game weather: Temp: • Wind: • Weather:
- TV announcers (ESPN3): Dave Leno & Ken Dunek

=== At Texas State ===
Team	1	2	3	4	Total
• Navy	14	14	0	7	35
Texas State	0	7	0	14	21

- Date: September 13, 2014
- Location: Bobcat Stadium, San Marcos, Texas
- Game start: 8:00 pm
- Game attendance: 32,007
- Game weather: Temp: • Wind: • Weather:
- TV announcers (ESPNews): Joel Meyers & Al Groh

=== Rutgers ===
Team	1	2	3	4	Total
• Rutgers	10	7	14	0	31
Navy	7	7	3	7	24

- Date: September 20, 2014
- Location: Navy–Marine Corps Memorial Stadium, Annapolis, Maryland
- Game start: 3:30 pm
- Game attendance: 33,655
- Game weather: Temp: • Wind: • Weather:
- TV announcers (CBSSN): John Sadak, Randy Cross, & Sheehan Stanwick Burch

=== Western Kentucky ===
Team	1	2	3	4	Total
• WKU	3	10	9	14	36
Navy	7	7	7	6	27

- Date: September 27, 2014
- Location: Navy–Marine Corps Memorial Stadium, Annapolis, Maryland
- Game start: 3:30 pm
- Game attendance: 30,537
- Game weather: Temp: • Wind: • Weather:
- TV announcers (CBSSN): John Sadak, Randy Cross, & Susannah Collins

=== At Air Force ===
Commander-in-Chief's Trophy

Team	1	2	3	4	Total
Navy	7	7	0	7	21
• Air Force	14	0	7	9	30

- Date: October 4, 2014
- Location: Falcon Stadium, USAF Academy, Colorado Springs, Colorado
- Game start: 3:30 pm (1:30 pm MST)
- Game attendance: 37,731
- Game weather: Temp: • Wind: • Weather:
- TV announcers (CBSSN): John Sadak, Randy Cross, & Susannah Collins

=== VMI ===
Team	1	2	3	4	Total
VMI	0	7	0	7	14
• Navy	14	23	7	7	51

- Date: October 11, 2014
- Location: Navy–Marine Corps Memorial Stadium, Annapolis, Maryland
- Game start: 3:30 pm
- Game attendance: 33,812
- Game weather: Temp: • Wind: • Weather:
- TV announcers (CBSSN): John Sadak, Randy Cross, & Susannah Collins

=== San Jose State ===
Team	1	2	3	4	Total
San Jose State	3	14	0	14	31
• Navy	0	24	7	10	41

- Date: October 25, 2014
- Location: Navy–Marine Corps Memorial Stadium, Annapolis, Maryland
- Game start: 1:00 pm
- Game attendance: 30,612
- Game weather: Temp: 62 F • Wind: • Weather: Broken Clouds
- TV announcers (CBSSN): John Sadak, Randy Cross, & Susannah Collins

=== Vs. Notre Dame ===
Navy–Notre Dame football rivalry

Team	1	2	3	4	Total
• #10 Notre Dame	14	14	0	21	49
Navy	7	10	14	8	39

- Date: November 1, 2014
- Location: FedExField, Landover, Maryland
- Game start: 8:00 pm
- Elapsed time: 3:37
- Game attendance: 36,807
- Game weather: Temp: 46 F • Wind: 20 MPH • Weather: Partly Cloudy
- TV announcers (CBS): Andrew Catalon, Aaron Taylor, & Jamie Erdahl

=== Georgia Southern ===
Team	1	2	3	4	Total
Georgia Southern	7	0	6	6	19
• Navy	7	10	14	21	52

- Date: November 15, 2014
- Location: Navy–Marine Corps Memorial Stadium, Annapolis, Maryland
- Game start: 3:30 pm
- Game attendance: 33,894
- Game weather: Temp: 44 F • Wind: • Weather: Partly Sunny
- TV announcers (CBSSN): John Sadak, Randy Cross, & Susannah Collins

=== At South Alabama ===
Team	1	2	3	4	Total
• Navy	7	14	14	7	42
South Alabama	13	0	3	20	36

- Date: November 28, 2014
- Location: Ladd–Peebles Stadium, Mobile, Alabama
- Game start: 3:00 pm
- Game attendance: 14,571
- Game weather: Temp: 32 F • Wind: • Weather: Broken Clouds
- TV announcers (ESPN3): Darren Goldwater & Peter Vaas

=== Vs. Army ===
115th Army–Navy Game/Commander-in-Chief's Trophy

Team	1	2	3	4	Total
• Navy	0	7	3	7	17
Army	7	0	0	3	10

- Date: December 13, 2014
- Location: M&T Bank Stadium, Baltimore
- Game start: 3:00 pm
- Game attendance: 70,935
- Game weather: Temp: 41 F • Wind: NW 5-10 MPH • Weather: Partly Sunny
- TV announcers (CBS): Verne Lundquist, Gary Donaldson, & Allie LaForce

=== Vs. San Diego State (Poinsettia Bowl) ===
2014 Poinsettia Bowl

Team	1	2	3	4	Total
• Navy	7	0	7	3	17
SDS	10	3	3	0	16

- Date: December 23, 2014
- Location: Qualcomm Stadium, San Diego, California
- Game start: 9:30 pm
- Game attendance: 33,077
- Game weather: Temp: 68 F • Wind: N 8 MPH • Weather: Mostly Cloudy
- TV announcers (ESPN/ESPN Radio): Tom Hart, Mike Bellotti, & Heather Mitts/Bill Rosinski, David Norrie, & Joe Schad

== Personnel ==
=== Roster ===
2014 Navy Midshipmen football team roster
Players
Coaches
Offense

Pos.	#	Name	Class
WR	2	Tim Tupa	Fr
WR	4	Jamir Tillman	So
QB	5	Travis Marshall	Fr
SB	8	Colin Osborne	Jr
QB	9	Kenneth Mouton	So
QB	10	John Hendrick	Sr
WR	13	Tyris Wooten	Fr
QB	14	Troy Thompson	So
QB	15	Will Worth	So
QB	18	Tago Smith	So
QB	19	Keenan Reynolds	Jr
SB	21	DeBrandon Sanders	Jr
SB	22	Toneo Gulley	So
FB	23	Myles Swain	So
SB	24	Ryan Williams-Jenkins	Sr
SB	25	Demond Brown	Jr
SB	26	Chris High	Fr
SB	28	Dishan Romine	So
SB	29	Geoffrey Whiteside	Sr
FB	32	Quentin Ezell	Jr
SB	33	John Brown	Fr
FB	34	Noah Copeland (C)	Sr
SB	35	Jahmaal Daniel	Fr
FB	36	Quinton Singleton	Sr
FB	37	Chris Swain	Jr
SB	38	Kendrick Mouton	So
SB	44	Josh Brown	Fr
SB	45	Joshua Walker	Fr
WR	46	Conrey Meagher	Fr
FB	47	Justin Artis	Fr
SB	48	Nick Theos	Fr
WR	81	Brendan Dubeck	Sr
WR	84	Chad Lewellyn	Fr
WR	86	Julian Turner	So
WR	87	Brandon Colon	Fr
WR	88	Tyler Carmona	Fr
WR	89	Thomas Wilson	Jr

Defense

Pos.	#	Name	Class
S	2	Parrish Gaines (C)	Sr
CB	4	Iaasc Wright	Fr
CB	5	Quincy Adams	Jr
CB	6	Kyle Battle	So
CB	7	Shelley White	Jr
CB	8	Alex Duncan	Fr
CB	9	Myer Krah	Jr
CB	10	Cameron Bryant	So
CB	11	Abdul Majeed	Fr
LB	13	Jordan Drake	Sr
CB	14	Elijah Merchant	Fr
S	15	Lorentez Barbour	Jr
S	16	Justin Norton	Jr
CB	17	Kwazel Bertrnad	Fr
S	18	Dexter Bell	Fr
CB	19	George Schultz	Fr
SB	20	Calvin Cass	So
S	20	James Munson	Fr
CB	21	Jerry Thompson	Fr
OLB	22	Mike Kelly	So
LB	23	Mason Hicks	Fr
S	24	Randy Beggs	Fr
S	26	Daiquan Thomasson	So
LB	28	Zach Hester	Jr
LB	29	Winn Howard	So
LB	31	Shawn White	So
LB	31	Micah Thomas	Fr
CB	32	Devin Harris	Fr
LB	33	Maika Polamalu	Sr
LB	34	Tony Mack	Fr
OLB	35	Nick Martinez	Jr
LB	36	Jalen Wade	So
LB	37	Joe Nauert	Fr
OLB	38	William Tuider	So
S	39	Shakir Robinson	Sr
OLB	40	Kevin McCoy	Fr
S	42	George Jamison	Sr
SB	42	Darryl Bonner	Fr
S	43	Brandon Jones	Fr
OLB	44	Obi Uzoma	Sr
DE	45	Paul Quessenberry	Sr
OLB	46	Chris Johnson	Sr
DE	47	A.K. Akpunku	Jr
OLB	48	Joshua Powell	So
LB	49	Anthony Lewis	Sr
LB	50	Don Pearson	Jr
OT	50	Robert Lindsey	Fr
G	51	Seth White	Fr
LB	51	James Britton	Sr
DE	52	Amos Mason	So
OT	52	Evan Akins	Fr
OT	53	Billy Kimball	Fr
OLB	53	Kikau Pescaia	Jr
LB	54	Tyler Goble	Jr
OT	54	John Ferguson	So
OT	55	Jordan Pittman	Fr
OLB	55	Ted Colburn	So
LB	56	Joe Worth	Sr
G	57	E.K. Binns	Jr
OLB	57	Trey Olsen	Fr
LB	58	Daniel Gonzalas	So
C	58	Parker Wade	Fr
LB	59	Ryan Harris	So
G	60	Ben Tamburello	Jr
DE	60	Shane Atrim	Fr
DE	61	Sean Spencer	Fr
OT	61	Brandon Greene	Jr
OT	62	Bradyn Heap	Sr
DE	62	Zach Peck	Fr
C	63	Blaze Ryder	Jr
G	64	Jake Zuzek	Sr
OT	65	Joey Gaston	Jr
DE	65	Tyler Sayles	Fr
G	66	Jeremiah Robbins	So
G	67	Nathaniel Otto	Sr
NG	68	Patrick Forrestal	So
OT	68	Alex Brown	So
OT	69	Patrick Hoffman	So
NG	70	Austin Hague	Fr
C	70	Maurice Norris	So
G	71	Evan Martin	Fr
G	72	Adam West	So
C	73	Andrew Martin	So
G	74	Rob Dusz	So
C	75	Tanner Flemming	Sr
OT	76	Blake Benjamin	Jr
G	77	Trenton Nollar	Fr
NG	77	Benard Sarra	Jr
G	78	Kyle Cregge	Sr
OT	79	Blake Copeland	So
OLB	81	Eli Dawson	Fr
OLB	83	Myles Davenport	Fr
OLB	85	D.J. Palmore	Fr
OLB	86	Dylan Roney	Fr
DE	90	Will Anthony	Jr
DE	91	Aaron Davis	So
DE	92	David Gordeuk	Jr
DE	93	Reggie Miles	Fr
NG	95	Chris Nurthen	Sr
DE	96	Michael Raiford	Fr
DE	97	Nnamdi Uzoma	So
NG	98	A.J. Barnaby	Sr
DE	99	Sean Reaver	Jr

Special teams

Pos.	#	Name	Class
P	3	Alex Barta	So
K	6	Nick Sloan	Jr
P	11	Pablo Beltran	Sr
P	16	Gavin Jarnigan	Jr
K	43	Austin Grebe	Jr
LS	59	Ronnie Querry	Fr
LS	93	Joe Cardona	Sr
LS	94	Josh Antol	So
K	95	Patrick Cassley	Fr
P	96	Luke Holley	Fr
K	99	D.J. Grant-Johnson	So

Head coach

- Ken Niumatalolo

Coordinators/assistant coaches

- Chris Culton – Offensive line
- Justin Davis – Outside linebackers
- Dan O'Brien – Outside linebackers
- Buddy Green – Defensive coordinator/Secondary
- Ashley Ingram – Offensive line
- Ivin Jasper – Offensive coordinator/quarterbacks
- Steve Johns – Inside linebackers/Special teams
- Keith Jones – Secondary
- Mike Judge – Fullbacks
- Shaun Nua – Defensive line
- Danny O'Rourke – Slot backs
- Dale Pehrson – Defensive line
- Mick Yokitis – Wide receivers

Legend

- (C) Team captain
- (S) Suspended
- (I) Ineligible
- Injured
- Redshirt

Roster
Last update: September 1, 2014

=== Depth chart ===
The following players comprised the team's Depth chart prior to the 2013 Bell Helicopter Armed Forces Bowl:

Defense

FS
Parrish Gaines
Lorentez Barbour
Shakir Robinson

RAID	SAM	MIKE	SLB
William Tuider	Jordan Drake	James Britton	⋅
Obi Uzoma	Maika Polamalu	Daniel Gonzales	⋅
D.J. Palmore	Ryan Harris	Tyler Goble	⋅

ROV
Kwazel Bertrand
George Jamison
Daiquan Thomasson

CB
Brendon Clements
Myer Krah
Shelley White

DE	NT	DE
Will Anthony	Benard Sarra	Paul Quessenberry
Aaron Davis	Patrick Forrestal	A.K. Akpunku
Nnamdi Uzoma	Michael Raiford	Amos Mason

CB
Quincy Adams
Cameron Bryant
Elijah Merchant

Offense

WR
Jamir Tillman
Thomas Wilson
Julian Turner

SB
Geoffrey Whiteside
Ryan Williams-Jenkins
Toneo Gulley

LT	LG	C	RG	RT
Bradyn Heap	E.K. Binns	Tanner Fleming	Jake Zuzek	Joey Gaston
Brandon Greene	Ben Tamburello	Blaze Ryder	Nathaniel Otto	Blake Benjamin
Blake Copeland	Adam West	Maurice Morris	⋅	Blake Copeland

SB
DeBrandon Sanders
Demond Brown
Dishan Romine

WR
Brendan Dudeck
Brandon Colon
Marc Meier

QB
Keenan Reynolds
Tago Smith
Will Worth

FB
Noah Copeland
Chris Swain
Quinton Singleton

Special teams
PK Nick Sloan
PK Austin Grebe
P Pablo Beltran
P Gavin Jernigan
KR DeBrandon Sanders
PR Demond Brown
LS Joe Cardona
H Pablo Beltran
