= Javier Zuluaga =

American football player

Profile
- Positions: Linebacker; Fullback

Personal information
- Listed height: 6 ft 2 in (1.88 m)
- Listed weight: 225 lb (102 kg)

Career information
- High school: Roncalli (Indianapolis, Indiana)
- College: Navy

Career history
- Tampa Bay Storm (1994)

Career AFL statistics
- Games played: 1
- Stats at ArenaFan.com

Javier Zuluaga is an American former professional football player. He was a fullback and linebacker for the Tampa Bay Storm of the Arena Football League (AFL). He played college football for the Navy Midshipmen.

== Early life ==
Zuluaga attended Roncalli High School located in Indianapolis, Indiana. He was a co-captain his senior year and helped lead his team to the 1988 3A State Championship.

== College career ==
Originally committed to play football at Southern Illinois, a Marine recruiter convinced Zuluaga to attend the United States Naval Academy and play linebacker for the school's football team. He was co-captain from 1990 to 1993. Zuluaga was known for his hard hitting; during the 1991 season against William and Mary, Zuluaga tackled W&M's quarterback Chris Hakel causing the a bar of the face mask to get to stuck to Hakel's. In 1993, he had 17 tackles against Air Force, Navy won the game 28–24 ending an 11-year losing streak. Zuluaga was among 26 midshipmen recommended for expulsion in a 1992 cheating scandal on an electrical engineering exam. A copy of the test was found the night before and was given out to many of the students. He was later expelled from the school – not for cheating, but for refusing to identify the people who were responsible.

== Professional career ==
In 1994, he tried out for the Baltimore CFL Colts, but did not make the roster. On May 17, 1994, he was signed by the Tampa Bay Storm of the Arena Football League; he was released August 6, 1994.

== Personal life ==
Zuluaga and his wife have three children. His son Luke ran track and field for the Air Force Falcons.
