= 2015 Navy Midshipmen football team =

American college football season

2015 Navy Midshipmen football

The American West Division co-champion Lambert-Meadowlands Trophy Military Bowl champion

Military Bowl, W 44–28 vs. Pittsburgh
- Conference: American Athletic Conference
- West Division

Ranking
- Coaches: No. 18
- AP: No. 18
- Record: 11–2 (7–1 AAC)
- Head coach: Ken Niumatalolo (8th season)
- Offensive coordinator: Ivin Jasper (8th season)
- Offensive scheme: Triple option
- Defensive coordinator: Dale Pehrson (interim season)
- Base defense: Multiple
- MVP: Keenan Reynolds
- Captains: Keenan Reynolds; Bernard Sarra
- Home stadium: Navy–Marine Corps Memorial Stadium

2015 American Athletic Conference football standings
| | Conf. | | | Overall |
| Team | W | | L | W | | L |
|---|---|---|---|---|---|---|
East Division
| Temple x | 7 | – | 1 | 10 | – | 4 |
| South Florida | 6 | – | 2 | 8 | – | 5 |
| Cincinnati | 4 | – | 4 | 7 | – | 6 |
| UConn | 4 | – | 4 | 6 | – | 7 |
| East Carolina | 3 | – | 5 | 5 | – | 7 |
| UCF | 0 | – | 8 | 0 | – | 12 |
West Division
| No. 8 Houston xy$ | 7 | – | 1 | 13 | – | 1 |
| No. 18 Navy x | 7 | – | 1 | 11 | – | 2 |
| Memphis | 5 | – | 3 | 9 | – | 4 |
| Tulsa | 3 | – | 5 | 6 | – | 7 |
| Tulane | 1 | – | 7 | 3 | – | 9 |
| SMU | 1 | – | 7 | 2 | – | 10 |
Championship: Houston 24, Temple 13
$ – Conference champion; x – Division champion/co-champions; y – Championship game participant; As of December 31, 2015; Rankings from AP Poll

The 2015 Navy Midshipmen football team represented the United States Naval Academy in the 2015 NCAA Division I FBS football season. The Midshipmen were led by eighth-year head coach Ken Niumatalolo and played their home games at Navy–Marine Corps Memorial Stadium. The Midshipmen competed as a member of the Western Division of the American Athletic Conference, and were first year members of the conference. In their entire football history, this was the first season that Navy did not compete as an Independent. They finished the season 11–2, 7–1 in American Athletic play to finish in a tie for the Western Division title with Houston. However, due to their head-to-head loss to Houston, they did not represent the Western Division in the American Championship. They were invited to the Military Bowl where they defeated Pittsburgh.

== Before the season ==
=== Spring practices ===
Navy held spring practices during March and April 2015.

== Schedule ==
| Date | Time | Opponent | Rank | Site | TV | Result | Attendance | Source |
|---|---|---|---|---|---|---|---|---|
| September 5 | 12:00 p.m. | Colgate* | | Navy–Marine Corps Memorial Stadium; Annapolis, MD | CBSSN | W 48–10 | 28,015 | |
| September 19 | 3:30 p.m. | East Carolina | | Navy–Marine Corps Memorial Stadium; Annapolis, MD | CBSSN | W 45–21 | 34,717 | |
| September 26 | 12:00 p.m. | at UConn | | Pratt & Whitney Stadium at Rentschler Field; East Hartford, CT | CBSSN | W 28–18 | 33,204 | |
| October 3 | 3:30 p.m. | Air Force* | | Navy–Marine Corps Memorial Stadium; Annapolis, MD (Commander-in-Chief's Trophy) | CBSSN | W 33–11 | 32,705 | |
| October 10 | 3:30 p.m. | at No. 15 Notre Dame* | | Notre Dame Stadium; Notre Dame, IN (rivalry) | NBC | L 24–41 | 80,795 | |
| October 24 | 1:00 p.m. | Tulane | | Navy–Marine Corps Memorial Stadium; Annapolis, MD | CBSSN | W 31–14 | 32,033 | |
| October 31 | 12:00 p.m. | South Florida | | Navy–Marine Corps Memorial Stadium; Annapolis, MD | CBSSN | W 29–17 | 26,766 | |
| November 7 | 7:00 p.m. | at No. 13 Memphis | | Liberty Bowl Memorial Stadium; Memphis, TN | ESPN2 | W 45–20 | 55,212 | |
| November 14 | 3:30 p.m. | SMU | No. 20 | Navy–Marine Corps Memorial Stadium; Annapolis, MD (Gansz Trophy) | CBSSN | W 55–14 | 35,778 | |
| November 21 | 7:00 p.m. | at Tulsa | No. 16 | Skelly Field at H. A. Chapman Stadium; Tulsa, OK | CBSSN | W 44–21 | 22,749 | |
| November 27 | 12:00 p.m. | at Houston | No. 15 | TDECU Stadium; Houston, TX | ABC | L 31–52 | 40,562 | |
| December 12 | 3:00 p.m. | vs. Army* | No. 21 | Lincoln Financial Field; Philadelphia, PA (Army–Navy Game, College GameDay) | CBS | W 21–17 | 69,722 | |
| December 28 | 2:30 p.m. | Pittsburgh* | No. 21 | Navy–Marine Corps Memorial Stadium; Annapolis, MD (Military Bowl) | ESPN | W 44–28 | 36,352 | |
*Non-conference game; Rankings from AP Poll and CFP Rankings after November 3 released prior to game; All times are in Eastern time

== Rankings ==
Note: Navy is ranked for the first time since their 2004 season. (Ranked 24 in AP poll)

The Midshipmen have been nationally ranked for four consecutive weeks, making it the first time this has happened since 1978.

Ranking movements Legend: ██ Increase in ranking ██ Decrease in ranking — = Not ranked RV = Received votes
| | Week | | | | | | | | | | | | | | | | |
| Poll | Pre | 1 | 2 | 3 | 4 | 5 | 6 | 7 | 8 | 9 | 10 | 11 | 12 | 13 | 14 | 15 | Final |
|---|---|---|---|---|---|---|---|---|---|---|---|---|---|---|---|---|---|
| AP | — | — | — | — | RV | RV | RV | — | — | RV | 22 | 19 | 16 | 16 | 22 | 21 | 18 |
| Coaches | — | — | — | — | RV | RV | RV | RV | RV | RV | 23 | 19 | 15 | 15 | 22 | 22 | 18 |
| CFP | Not released | | | | | | | | | — | 20 | 16 | 15 | 15 | 23 | 21 | Not released |

== Roster ==
2015 Navy Midshipmen football team roster
Players
Coaches
Offense

| Pos. | # | Name | Class |
|---|---|---|---|
| WR | 2 | Trayvon Clark | Fr |
| WR | 2 | Luke Holley | So |
| QB | 3 | Zach Abey | Jr |
| WR | 4 | Jamir Tillman | Jr |
| QB | 5 | Travis Marshall | So |
| SB | 5 | Akili Taylor | Fr |
| QB | 7 | Garret Lewis | Fr |
| QB | 8 | Cole Euverard | Fr |
| SB | 9 | Cameron Dudeck | Fr |
| QB | 10 | Derek Morefield | Fr |
| WR | 11 | Conrey Meagher | So |
| QB | 11 | Troy Thompson | Jr |
| WR | 13 | Tyris Wooten | So |
| WR | 14 | Chris Von Hendrix | Fr |
| QB | 15 | Will Worth | Jr |
| QB | 17 | Brandon Coleman | Fr |
| QB | 18 | Tago Smith | Jr |
| QB | 19 | Keenan Reynolds (C) | Sr |
| SB | 20 | Calvin Cass Jr. | Jr |
| SB | 21 | DeBrandon Sanders | Sr |
| SB | 22 | Toneo Gulley | Jr |
| FB | 23 | Myles Swain | Jr |
| SB | 24 | Joshua Walker | So |
| SB | 24 | Jahmaal Daniel | So |
| SB | 25 | Demond Brown | Sr |
| SB | 26 | Bryan Hammond | Fr |
| SB | 28 | Dishan Romine | Jr |
| SB | 29 | Darryl Bonner | So |
| FB | 31 | Shawn White | Jr |
| FB | 32 | Quentin Ezell | Sr |
| FB | 33 | Chris High | So |
| FB | 34 | Anthony Gargiulo | Fr |
| WR | 35 | Kel Williamson | Fr |
| FB | 36 | Jalen White | Jr |
| FB | 37 | Chris Swain | Sr |
| SB | 38 | John Brown III | So |
| FB | 39 | Justin Artis | So |
| SB | 40 | Mike Martin | Fr |
| SB | 42 | Kendrick Mouton | Jr |
| SB | 44 | Josh Brown | So |
| FB | 46 | Will Huntsman | Sr |
| SB | 47 | Travis Pospisil | Fr |
| WR | 49 | Colin Butler | So |
| WR | 81 | Taylor Johnson | Fr |
| WR | 82 | Craig Scott | So |
| WR | 83 | Marc Meier | Sr |
| WR | 84 | Chad Lewellyn | So |
| WR | 86 | Julian Turner | Jr |
| WR | 87 | Brandon Colon | So |
| WR | 88 | Tyler Carmona | So |
| WR | 89 | Thomas Wilson | Sr |

Defense

| Pos. | # | Name | Class |
|---|---|---|---|
| CB | 2 | Brendon Clements | Jr |
| S | 2 | Lorentez Barbour | Sr |
| OLB | 3 | Brandon Jones | So |
| S | 4 | Isaac Wright | So |
| CB | 5 | Quincy Adams (injured) | Sr |
| CB | 6 | Sean Williams | Fr |
| CB | 7 | Shelley White (injured) | Sr |
| S | 8 | Randy Beggs | So |
| OLB | 9 | Myer Krah | Sr |
| CB | 10 | Cameron Bryant | Jr |
| S | 11 | Jerry Thompson | So |
| CB | 13 | Kyle Battle | Jr |
| CB | 14 | Elijah Merchant | So |
| CB | 15 | John Gillis | Fr |
| CB | 16 | Jarid Ryan | Fr |
| S | 17 | Kwazel Bertrnad | So |
| CB | 19 | Elijah Jones | Fr |
| S | 20 | James Munson | So |
| CB | 21 | Abdul Majeed | So |
| S | 22 | Conner Doyle | Fr |
| LB | 23 | Mason Hicks | So |
| S | 24 | Forrest Forte | Fr |
| S | 25 | Juan Hailey | Fr |
| S | 26 | Daiquan Thomasson | Jr |
| OLB | 28 | Travis Kerchner | Fr |
| S | 29 | Brady Petersen | Fr |
| S | 31 | Khaylan Williams | Fr |
| LB | 32 | John Fiorelli | Fr |
| S | 34 | Justin Norton | So |
| OLB | 35 | Nick Martinez | Sr |
| OLB | 37 | Tony Delmonico | Fr |
| OLB | 38 | Dexter Bell | So |
| OLB | 39 | Dre Williamson | Fr |
| OLB | 40 | Kevin McCoy | So |
| LB | 47 | Zach Hester | Sr |
| OLB | 43 | Jordan Pittman | So |
| LB | 44 | Micah Thomas | So |
| OLB | 45 | D.J. Palmore | So |
| OLB | 46 | Terrence Laster | So |
| OLB | 47 | A.K. Akpunku | Sr |
| OLB | 48 | Joshua Powell | Jr |
| OLB | 49 | Mike Kelly | Jr |
| LB | 50 | Don Pearson | Sr |
| G | 50 | Steve Satchall | Fr |
| LB | 51 | Winn Howard | So |
| OT | 51 | Adam Amosa | Fr |
| OT | 52 | Zach Peck | So |
| DE | 52 | Amos Mason | Jr |
| OT | 53 | Tony Taylor | Fr |
| OLB | 53 | Kikau Pescaia | Sr |
| G | 54 | Chibuzo Ukandu | Fr |
| LB | 54 | Tyler Goble | Sr |
| OT | 55 | Jake Hawk | Fr |
| OLB | 55 | Ted Colburn (injured) | Jr |
| LB | 56 | Myles Davenport | So |
| OLB | 57 | Trey Olsen | So |
| G | 57 | E.K. Binns (injured) | Sr |
| LB | 58 | Daniel Gonzalas | Jr |
| G | 58 | Chris Gesell | Fr |
| LB | 59 | Ryan Harris | Jr |
| OC | 59 | Tyler Morgenthaler | Fr |
| NG | 60 | Lance Angulo | Fr |
| G | 60 | Ben Tamburello | Sr |
| C | 61 | Brandon Greene | Sr |
| DE | 61 | Jake Banholzer | Fr |
| C | 62 | Parker Wade | So |
| DE | 62 | Buck Elliot | Fr |
| DE | 63 | Kevin Uebelhardt | Fr |
| OT | 63 | Seth White | So |
| C | 64 | Bryan Barrett | Fr |
| C | 64 | Blaze Ryder | Sr |
| NG | 64 | Anthony Villalobos | Fr |
| OT | 65 | Joey Gaston | Sr |
| DE | 65 | Josh Webb | Fr |
| DE | 66 | J.T. Wise | Fr |
| G | 66 | Jeremiah Robbins | Jr |
| DE | 67 | Jarvis Polu | Fr |
| C | 67 | Zach Laniewski | Sr |
| NG | 68 | Patrick Forrestal | Jr |
| G | 68 | Alex Brown | Jr |
| DE | 69 | Nick Czar | Fr |
| OT | 69 | Andrew Wood | Fr |
| C | 70 | Maurice Norris | Jr |
| NG | 70 | Austin Hauge | So |
| DE | 71 | Garrett Wiedle | Fr |
| G | 71 | Evan Martin | So |
| DE | 72 | Jackson Mitchell | Fr |
| G | 72 | Adam West | Jr |
| OT | 73 | Shane Artim | So |
| NG | 73 | Alec Keener | Fr |
| OT | 74 | Rob Dusz | Jr |
| OT | 74 | Artie Vasquez | Fr |
| OT | 75 | Robert Lindsey | So |
| NG | 76 | Trenton Nollar | So |
| OT | 76 | Evan Akins | So |
| NG | 77 | Benard Sarra (C) | Sr |
| G | 77 | Laurent Njiki | Fr |
| OT | 78 | John Ferguson | Jr |
| OT | 79 | Blake Copeland | Jr |
| OLB | 80 | Monte Armstrong | Fr |
| OLB | 81 | Eli Dawson | So |
| LB | 82 | Conner Doris | Fr |
| LB | 83 | Taylor Heflin | Fr |
| LB | 84 | Hawken Hydrick | Fr |
| OLB | 85 | Zach Richards | Fr |
| LB | 86 | Matt Stewart | Fr |
| LB | 87 | Hudson Sullivan | Fr |
| OLB | 89 | Ryan West | Fr |
| DE | 90 | Will Anthony | Sr |
| DE | 91 | Tyler Sayles | So |
| DE | 92 | David Gordeuk | Sr |
| DE | 93 | Reggie Miles | So |
| NG | 94 | Nofo Tii | Fr |
| DE | 95 | Sean Spencer | So |
| DE | 96 | Michael Raiford | So |
| DE | 97 | Nnamdi Uzoma | Jr |
| NG | 98 | Dylan Fischer | So |
| DE | 99 | Sean Reaver | Sr |

Special teams

| Pos. | # | Name | Class |
|---|---|---|---|
| K | 1 | Patrick Cassley | So |
| K | 6 | Nick Sloan | Sr |
| P | 16 | Gavin Jernigan | Sr |
| K | 43 | Austin Grebe | Sr |
| K | 48 | D.J. Grant-Johnson | Jr |
| P | 80 | Alex Barta | Jr |
| LS | 85 | Ronnie Querry | So |
| LK | 93 | Bennett Moehring | Fr |
| K | 94 | Josh Antol | Fr |
| P | 98 | Erik Harris | Fr |
| LS | 99 | Nate Hawkins | So |

Head coach

- Ken Niumatalolo

Coordinators/assistant coaches

- Chris Culton – Offensive line
- Justin Davis – Outside linebackers
- Dan O'Brien – Outside linebackers
- Buddy Green (injured) – Defensive coordinator/Secondary (replaced by Dale Pehrson)
- Ashley Ingram – Offensive line
- Ivin Jasper – Offensive coordinator/quarterbacks
- Steve Johns – Inside linebackers/special teams
- Keith Jones – Secondary
- Mike Judge – Fullbacks
- Shaun Nua – Defensive line
- Danny O'Rourke – Slot Backs
- Dale Pehrson – Defensive line
- Mick Yokitis – Wide receivers

Legend

- (C) Team captain
- (S) Suspended
- (I) Ineligible
- Injured
- Redshirt

Roster
Last update: September 5, 2015

=== Depth chart ===
The following players comprised the team's Depth chart prior to the 2014 Poinsettia Bowl:

Defense

FS
Lorentez Barbour
Justin Norton
Randy Beggs

| RAID | SAM | MIKE | SLB |
|---|---|---|---|
| D.J. Palmore | Daniel Gonzales | Micah Thomas | ⋅ |
| A.K. Akpunku | Ryan Harris | Myles Davenport | ⋅ |
| Kevin McCoy | Winn Howard | Tyler Goble | ⋅ |

ROV
⋅
⋅
⋅

CB
Brendon Clements
Elijah Merchant
Cameron Bryant

| DE | NT | DE |
|---|---|---|
| Will Anthony | Benard Sarra | Amos Mason |
| Michael Raiford | Patrick Forrestal | Nnamdi Uzoma |
| Sean Spencer | Trenton Noller | Jarvis Polu |

CB
Quincy Adams
Sean Williams
Kyle Battle

Offense

WR
Jamir Tillman
Brandon Colon
Chad Lewellyn

SB
Demond Brown
Dishan Romine
Joshua Walker

| LT | LG | C | RG | RT |
|---|---|---|---|---|
| Joey Gaston | E.K. Binns | Brandon Greene | Ben Tamburello | Robert Lindsey |
| Andrew Wood | Adam West | Maurice Morris | Evan Martin | Blake Copeland |
| John Ferguson | Alex Brown | Parker Wade | Jeremiah Robbins | Adam Amosa |

SB
DeBrandon Sanders
Calvin Cass Jr.
Toneo Gulley

WR
Thomas Wilson
Craig Scott
Marc Meier

QB
Keenan Reynolds
Tago Smith
Will Worth

FB
Chris Swain
Quinton Ezell
Shawn White

Special teams
PK Austin Grebe
PK Nick Sloan
P Alex Barta
P Gavin Jernigan
KR Demond Brown
PR DeBrandon Sanders
LS Josh Antol
H Will Worth

== Game summaries ==
=== Colgate ===
| Team | 1 | 2 | 3 | 4 | Total |
|---|---|---|---|---|---|
| Colgate | 3 | 0 | 0 | 7 | 10 |
| • Navy | 10 | 21 | 7 | 10 | 48 |

- Date: September 5, 2015
- Location: Navy–Marine Corps Memorial Stadium, Annapolis, Maryland
- Game start: 12:04 pm EST
- Elapsed time: 3 hours 15 minutes
- Game attendance: 28,015
- Game weather: Temp: 77 F • Wind: NE 7 MPH • Weather: Partly Cloudy
- Referee: Ed Ardito
- TV announcers (CBS Sports Network): John Sadak, Randy Cross, and Sheehan Stanwick Burch

=== East Carolina ===
| Team | 1 | 2 | 3 | 4 | Total |
|---|---|---|---|---|---|
| East Carolina | 7 | 7 | 0 | 7 | 21 |
| • Navy | 7 | 21 | 0 | 17 | 45 |

- Date: September 19, 2015
- Location: Navy–Marine Corps Memorial Stadium, Annapolis, Maryland
- Game start: 3:34 pm EST
- Elapsed time: 3 hours 22 minutes
- Game attendance: 34,717
- Game weather: Temp: 80 F • Wind: SSE 10-15 MPH • Weather: Sunny, Clear Skies
- Referee: Rick Lourniet
- TV announcers (CBS Sports Network): John Sadak, Randy Cross, and Sheehan Stanwick Burch

=== At UConn ===
| Team | 1 | 2 | 3 | 4 | Total |
|---|---|---|---|---|---|
| • Navy | 7 | 14 | 0 | 7 | 28 |
| UConn | 3 | 7 | 0 | 8 | 18 |

- Date: September 26, 2015
- Location: Rentschler Field, East Hartford, Connecticut
- Game start: 12:04 pm EST
- Elapsed time: 3 hours 17 minutes
- Game attendance: 33,204
- Game weather: Temp: 64 F • Wind: NW 3-6 MPH • Weather: Mostly Sunny
- Referee: Todd LaPenta
- TV announcers (CBS Sports Network): Dave Ryan, Corey Chavous, and Lauren Gardner (sideline)

=== Air Force ===
Commander-in-Chief's Trophy

| Team | 1 | 2 | 3 | 4 | Total |
|---|---|---|---|---|---|
| Air Force | 0 | 0 | 3 | 8 | 11 |
| • Navy | 7 | 14 | 6 | 6 | 33 |

- Date: October 3, 2015
- Location: Navy–Marine Corps Memorial Stadium, Annapolis, Maryland
- Game start: 3:39 pm EST
- Elapsed time: 3 hours 24 minutes
- Game attendance: 32,705
- Game weather: Temp: 56 F • Wind: NE 12-30 MPH • Weather: Overcast, Light Rain
- Referee: C. Castlebury
- TV announcers (CBS Sports Network): John Sadak, Randy Cross, and Sheehan Stanwick Burch (sideline)

=== At Notre Dame ===
Rip Miller Trophy

| Team | 1 | 2 | 3 | 4 | Total |
|---|---|---|---|---|---|
| Navy | 7 | 14 | 3 | 0 | 24 |
| • #15 Notre Dame | 7 | 17 | 14 | 3 | 41 |

- Date: October 10, 2015
- Location: Notre Dame Stadium, South Bend, Indiana
- Game start: 3:40 pm EST
- Elapsed time: 3 hours 14 minutes
- Game attendance: 80,795
- Game weather: Temp: 63 F • Wind: W 8 MPH • Weather: Sunny
- Referee: Michael Roche
- TV announcers (NBC): Tom Hammond, Doug Flutie, and Kathryn Tappen (sideline)

=== Tulane ===
| Team | 1 | 2 | 3 | 4 | Total |
|---|---|---|---|---|---|
| Tulane | 0 | 7 | 0 | 7 | 14 |
| • Navy | 7 | 3 | 7 | 14 | 31 |

- Date: October 24, 2015
- Location: Navy–Marine Corps Memorial Stadium, Annapolis, Maryland
- Game start: 1:04 pm EST
- Elapsed time: 3 hours 13 minutes
- Game attendance: 32,033
- Game weather: Temp: 54 F • Wind: S 5 MPH • Weather: Overcast
- Referee: Todd LaPenta
- TV announcers (CBS Sports Network): John Sadak, Randy Cross, and Sheehan Stanwick Burch (sideline)

=== South Florida ===
| Team | 1 | 2 | 3 | 4 | Total |
|---|---|---|---|---|---|
| South Florida | 10 | 0 | 7 | 0 | 17 |
| • Navy | 3 | 10 | 3 | 13 | 29 |

- Date: October 31, 2015
- Location: Navy–Marine Corps Memorial Stadium, Annapolis, Maryland
- Game start: 12:04 pm EST
- Elapsed time: 3 hours 6 minutes
- Game attendance: 26,766
- Game weather: Temp: 53 F • Wind: SE 9 MPH • Weather: Sunny
- Referee: Rick Loumiet
- TV announcers (CBS Sports Network): John Sadak, Randy Cross, and Sheehan Stanwick Burch (sideline)

=== At Memphis ===
| Team | 1 | 2 | 3 | 4 | Total |
|---|---|---|---|---|---|
| • Navy | 7 | 10 | 14 | 14 | 45 |
| Memphis | 10 | 0 | 10 | 0 | 20 |

- Date: November 7, 2015
- Location: Liberty Bowl Memorial Stadium, Memphis, Tennessee
- Game start: 7:10 pm EST
- Elapsed time: 3 hours 6 minutes
- Game attendance: 55,212
- Game weather: Temp: 57 F • Wind: NE 5 MPH • Weather: Cloudy
- Referee: Adam Savoie
- TV announcers (ESPN2): Adam Amin, Kelly Stouffer, and Olivia Harlan (sideline)

=== SMU ===
Gansz Trophy

| Team | 1 | 2 | 3 | 4 | Total |
|---|---|---|---|---|---|
| SMU | 0 | 7 | 7 | 0 | 14 |
| • Navy | 14 | 14 | 6 | 21 | 55 |

- Date: November 14, 2015
- Location: Navy–Marine Corps Memorial Stadium, Annapolis, Maryland
- Game start: 3:39 pm EST
- Elapsed time: 3 hours 9 minutes
- Game attendance: 35,778
- Game weather: Temp: 53 F • Wind: NW 12-20 MPH • Weather: Sunny
- Referee: Todd LaPenta
- TV announcers (CBS Sports Network): John Sadak, Randy Cross, and Sheehan Stanwick Burch (sideline)

On Senior Day, Navy quarterback Keenan Reynolds reached the end zone for the 78th time to set the NCAA record for career rushing touchdowns, surpassing University of Wisconsin's Montee Ball who amassed 77 touchdowns during the 2009–2012 seasons. Number 78 came quickly on a 4-yard run on Navy's opening drive. Reynolds then scored three more rushing touchdowns to boost his career total to 81, leading his #20 ranked team past SMU. The Midshipmen racked up 403 yards rushing, reaching a season high in total points. With this win, they also remain undefeated in the American Athletic Conference (AAC).

=== At Tulsa ===
| Team | 1 | 2 | 3 | 4 | Total |
|---|---|---|---|---|---|
| • Navy | 7 | 16 | 14 | 7 | 44 |
| Tulsa | 0 | 7 | 7 | 7 | 21 |

- Date: November 21, 2015
- Location: Skelly Field at H. A. Chapman Stadium, Tulsa, Oklahoma
- Game start: 7:09 pm EST
- Elapsed time: 3 hours 16 minutes
- Game attendance: 22,749
- Game weather: Temp: 40 F • Wind: N 6 MPH • Weather: Clear skies
- Referee: Rick Loumiet
- TV announcers (CBS Sports Network): Rich Waltz, Adam Archuleta, and Rashan Ali (sideline)

The Navy offense racked up a total of 512 yards on the ground, while quarterback Keenan Reynolds ran for 81 yards with a rushing touchdown in the Midshipmen win over Tulsa with a score of 44-21. Reynolds also threw for a touchdown to become Navy's all-time leading rusher with 4,195 yards, breaking fellow Midshipmen Napoleon McCallum's record of 4,179 yards.

=== At Houston ===
| Team | 1 | 2 | 3 | 4 | Total |
|---|---|---|---|---|---|
| Navy | 7 | 7 | 3 | 14 | 31 |
| • Houston | 14 | 10 | 14 | 14 | 52 |

- Date: November 27, 2015
- Location: TDECU Stadium, Houston
- Game start: 12:05 pm EST
- Elapsed time: 3 hours 11 minutes
- Game attendance: 40,562
- Game weather: Temp: 76 F • Wind: SE 8 MPH • Weather: Cloudy & Humid
- Referee: Michael Roche
- TV announcers (ABC): Dave Flemming, Mack Brown, and Allison Williams (sideline)

Despite the American Athletic Conference west division title loss, Navy Midshipmen quarterback and Heisman Trophy contender Keenan Reynolds tied the Navy record for passing touchdowns with 29. Reynolds also tied Wisconsin's Montee Ball for the most touchdowns with 83 in FBS history.

=== Vs. Army ===
116th Army–Navy Game/Commander-in-Chief's Trophy

| Team | 1 | 2 | 3 | 4 | Total |
|---|---|---|---|---|---|
| • Navy | 7 | 7 | 7 | 0 | 21 |
| Army | 10 | 7 | 0 | 0 | 17 |

- Date: December 12, 2015
- Location: Lincoln Financial Field, Philadelphia
- Game start: 3:10 pm EST
- Elapsed time: 3 hours 26 minutes
- Game attendance: 69,722
- Game weather: Temp: 68 F • Wind: WSW 6 MPH • Weather: Mostly cloudy
- Referee: Tracy Jones
- TV announcers (CBS): Verne Lundquist, Gary Danielson, and Allie LaForce (sideline)

=== Vs. Pittsburgh (Military Bowl) ===
2015 Military Bowl

| Team | 1 | 2 | 3 | 4 | Total |
|---|---|---|---|---|---|
| Pittsburgh | 7 | 0 | 14 | 7 | 28 |
| • Navy | 14 | 7 | 10 | 13 | 44 |

- Date: December 28, 2015
- Location: Navy–Marine Corps Memorial Stadium, Annapolis, Maryland
- Game start: 2:35 pm EST
- Elapsed time: 3 hours 11 minutes
- Game attendance: 36,352
- Game weather: Temp: 44 F • Wind: NE 10 MPH • Weather: Cloudy
- Referee: Joe Pester
- TV announcers (ESPN): Eamon McAnaney, Rocky Boiman, and Quint Kessenich (sideline)

With this win, the Midshipmen ended the season 11-2, the first time in 135 years of school football history. Senior quarterback Keenan Reynolds scored four touchdowns: one touchdown pass and three rushing, becoming the NCAA career leader with 88 touchdowns and scoring a total of 530 points. Meanwhile, senior fullback Chris Swain rushed for a career 1,000 yards. The senior class picked up their 36th win, which tied the Midshipmen class of 1909.
