= Keenan Reynolds (American football) =

American football player (born 1994)

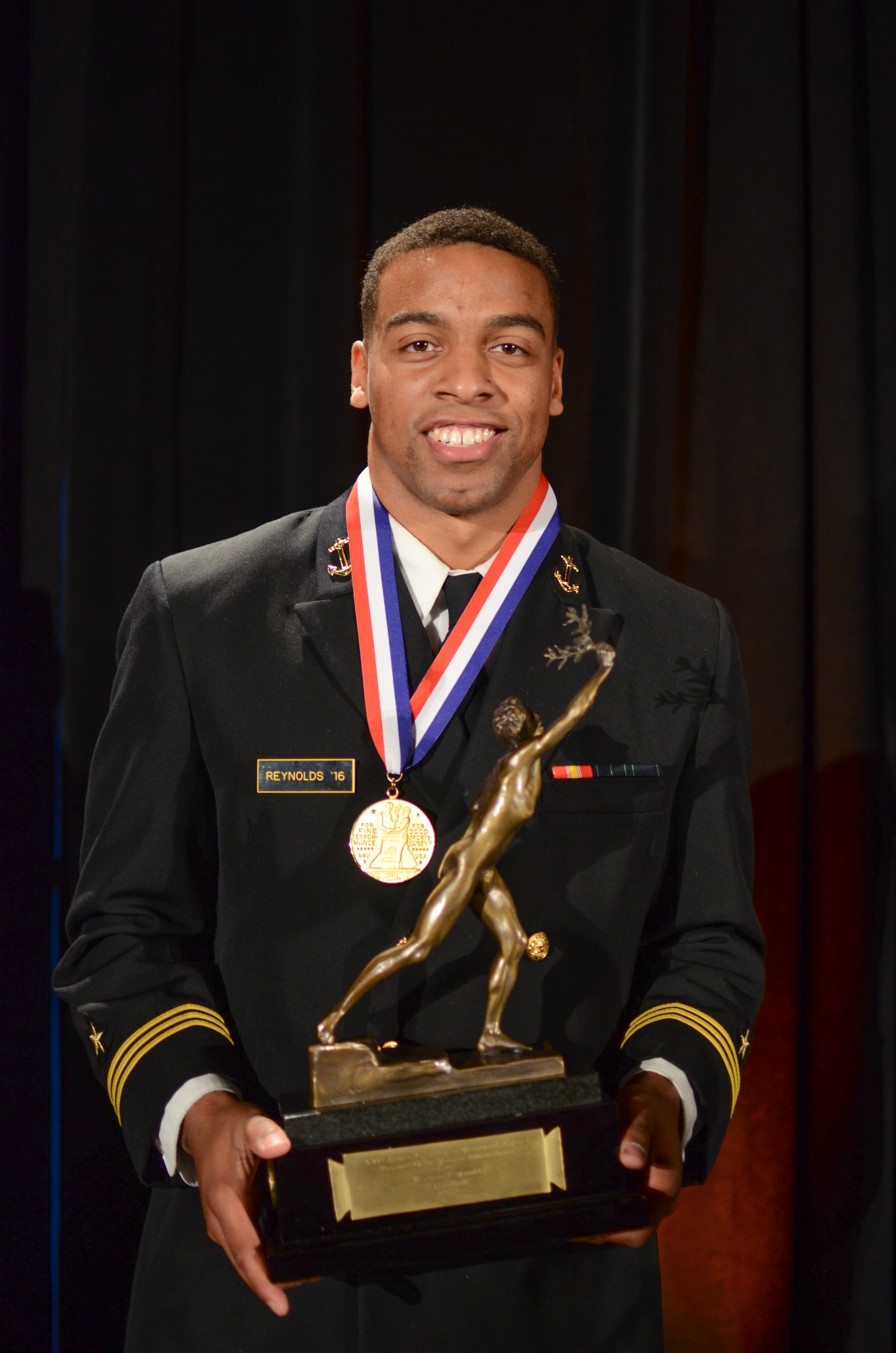
- Reynolds receiving James E. Sullivan Award in 2016

No. 19
- Position: Wide receiver

Personal information
- Born: December 13, 1994 (age 31); Antioch, Tennessee, U.S.
- Listed height: 5 ft 10 in (1.78 m)
- Listed weight: 191 lb (87 kg)

Career information
- High school: Goodpasture Christian (Madison, Tennessee)
- College: Navy (2012–2015)
- NFL draft: 2016: 6th round, 182nd overall pick

Career history
- Baltimore Ravens (2016); Washington Redskins (2017)*; Seattle Seahawks (2018); Seattle Dragons (2020)
- * Offseason or practice squad member only

Awards and highlights
- Third-team All-American (2015); AAC Offensive Player of the Year (2015); First-team All-AAC (2015); James E. Sullivan Award (2015); Navy Midshipmen No. 19 retired; FBS records: Most career rushing yards by a quarterback: 4,559; Most career rushing touchdowns: 88; Most rushing touchdowns by a quarterback in a game: 7

Career NFL statistics
- Games played: 2
- Stats at Pro Football Reference

Keenan Reynolds (born December 13, 1994) is an American former professional football player who was a wide receiver in the National Football League (NFL). He played college football for the Navy Midshipmen as a quarterback, earning third-team All-American honors in 2015. He finished his college career with an NCAA Division I record 88 career touchdowns and an FBS record 4,559 rushing yards by a quarterback. Reynolds currently serves in the United States Navy Reserve with the rank of lieutenant.

== Early life ==
Reynolds was born to Donald Reynolds, a former UT Martin football player, and Jacqueline Reynolds in Antioch, Tennessee. Reynolds started playing football at age five. He attended Goodpasture Christian School in Madison, where he led the school to a 27–6 record and consecutive district championships. He started for all four years. Reynolds also ran track and field, and was a member of the National Honor Society. Reynolds graduated in 2012 with four varsity letters.

== College career ==
After his senior year of high school, Reynolds received offers from Navy, Air Force, and Wofford. He also garnered interest from Middle Tennessee State and Vanderbilt. Eventually, he committed to Navy, being impressed by the school's campus and football record.

=== 2012 season ===
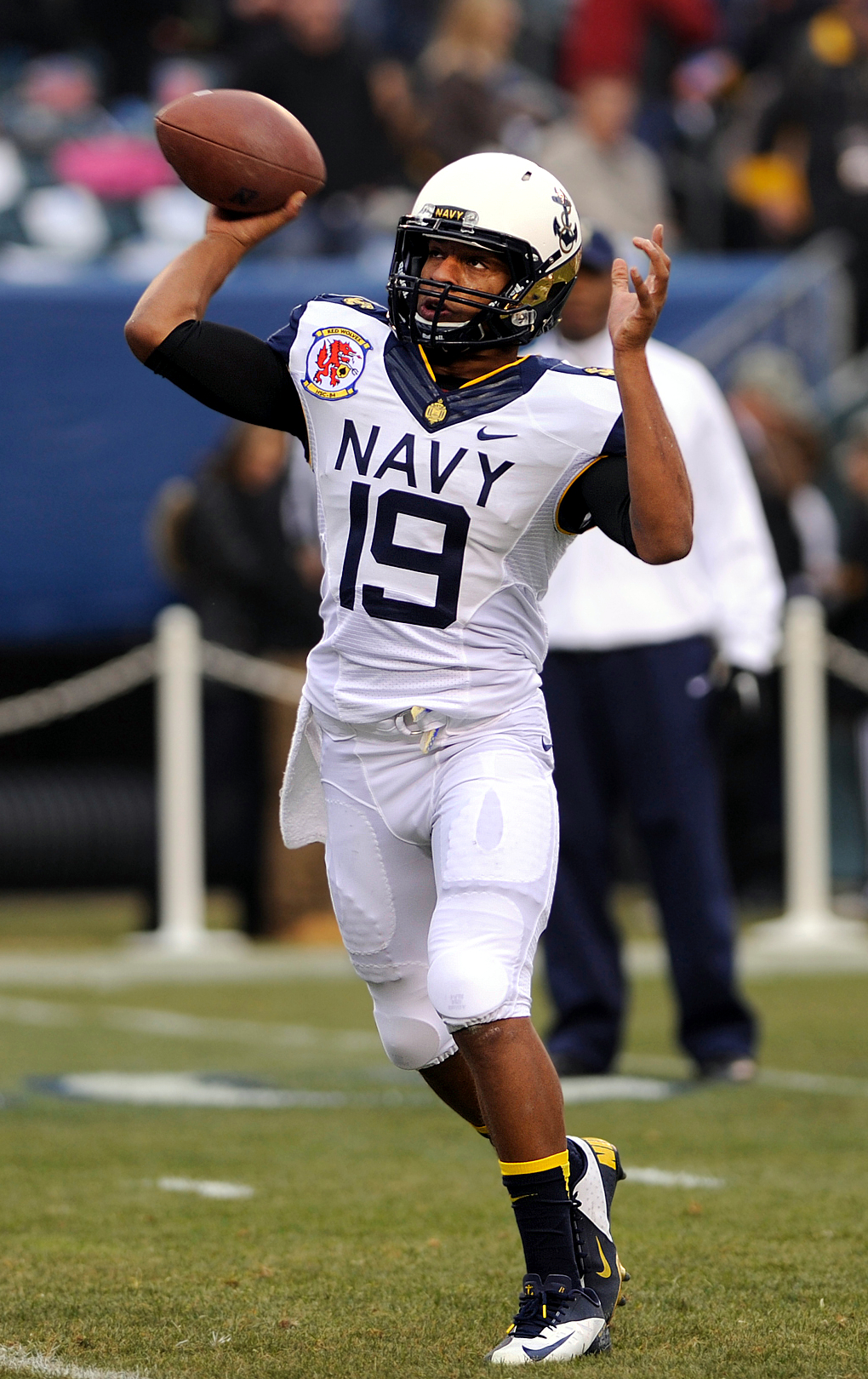
Reynolds throwing during warm-ups of the 2012 Army–Navy Game

Reynolds started his freshman season at the United States Naval Academy as the fourth-string quarterback, seeing minor action limited to garbage time. In the fourth game of the season against Air Force, starting quarterback Trey Miller injured his ankle and Reynolds took over, leading the Midshipmen to the win. Afterwards, Reynolds was named the starter, becoming the third freshman in school history to do so, for the final eight games of the season. The Midshipmen went 8–5 in 2012, but lost to the Arizona State Sun Devils in the Kraft Fight Hunger Bowl 62–28.

=== 2013 season ===
In 2013 against San Jose State, Reynolds scored seven rushing touchdowns, the most by a quarterback in NCAA history. At the end of the season, Reynolds had 29 rushing touchdowns, breaking Ricky Dobbs and Collin Klein's single season records. Navy finished the season 9–4 and won the Armed Forces Bowl against the Middle Tennessee Blue Raiders.

=== 2014 season ===
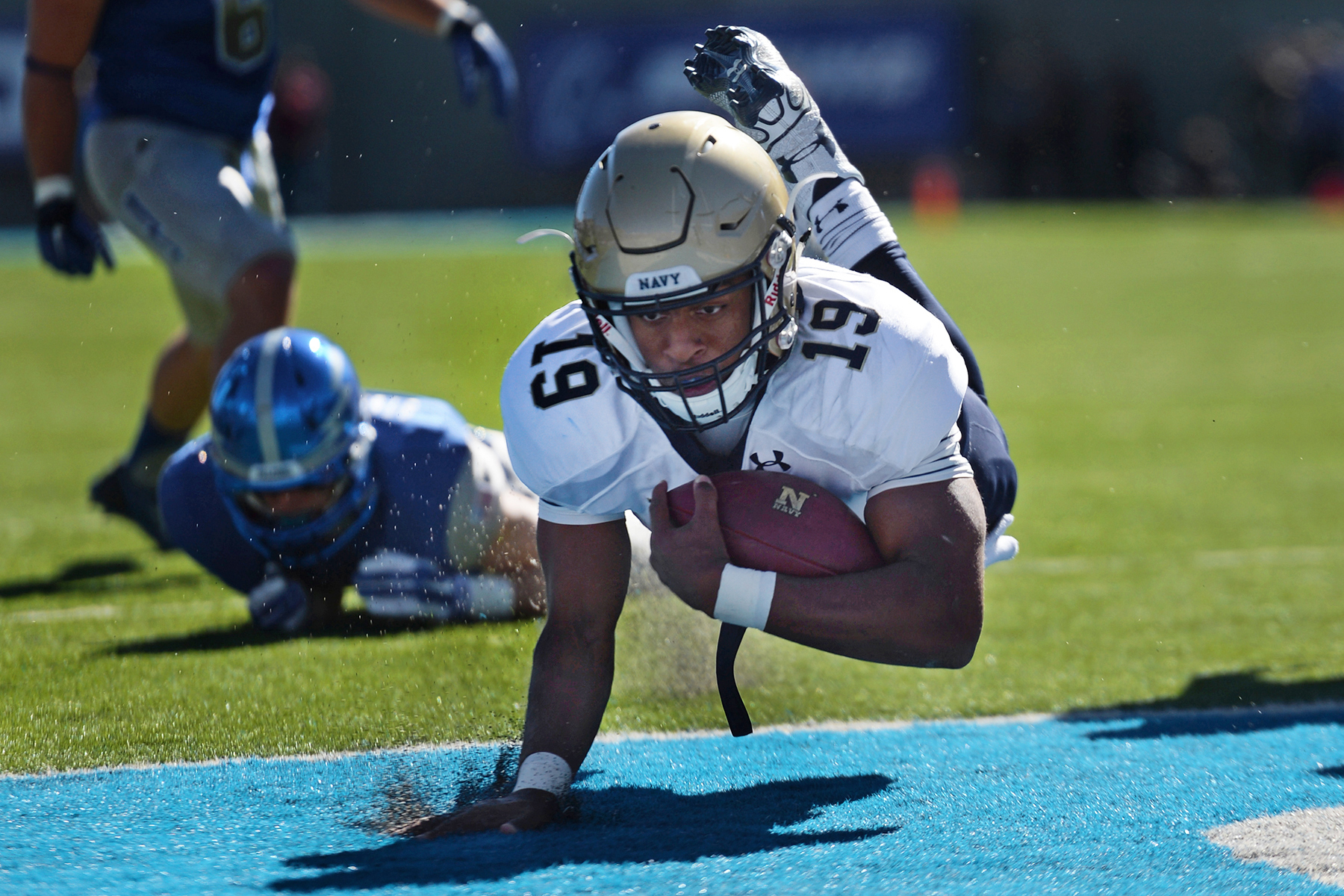
Reynolds scores against Air Force in 2014

Reynolds started eleven games in 2014. Against Temple, Reynolds twisted his knee and missed the game against Texas State. The 8–5 Midshipmen ended the season with a 17–16 win over the San Diego State Aztecs in the Poinsettia Bowl.

=== 2015 season ===
In the 2015 game against SMU, Reynolds broke the record for the most career rushing touchdowns in FBS history with 78, passing Montee Ball. Later in the season in the Army–Navy Game, Reynolds surpassed Adrian N. Peterson's record for the most rushing touchdowns in NCAA Division I history with 85. He later broke the record for most career total touchdowns with 88 and most rushing yards by a quarterback with 4,559. Reynolds also holds other quarterbacking records including the most career rushing attempts and touchdowns, most rushing touchdowns and most rushing touchdowns in a game. He is also the only Navy QB to go 4–0 against Army. Reynolds finished fifth in the Heisman Trophy running, the highest by a service academy player since Navy quarterback Roger Staubach's win in 1963. The 11–2 Midshipmen ended the season with a win over the Pittsburgh Panthers in the Military Bowl, winning 44–28 at home in their own stadium. With this win, Reynolds helped contribute to the first Navy team to ever achieve 11 wins in a season. Also, Reynolds and his senior class picked up their 36th win, which tied the Midshipmen class of 1909.

Reynolds later played in the 2016 East–West Shrine Game, an annual all-star game for seniors, where he made the East team upon switching from quarterback to running back. Even though he did not play in the game due to tightness in his back, he was made a unanimous captain for the East team. Moreover, during the East–West Shrine Game, Reynolds won the Pat Tillman Award, which "is presented to a player who best exemplifies character, intelligence, sportsmanship, and service. The award is about a student-athlete's achievements and conduct, both on and off the field."

On February 28, 2016, the Naval Academy announced that Reynolds would be the last player to wear Number 19. Reynolds joins the list of Roger Staubach (No. 12), Joe Bellino (No. 27), and Napoleon McCallum (No. 30) whose numbers have been retired by the academy.

=== Statistics ===
Legend
	FBS record
	Led NCAA Division I FBS
**Bold**	Career high

Year	Team	Games			Passing								Rushing			
Year	Team	GP	GS	Record	Cmp	Att	Pct	Yds	Avg	TD	INT	Rtg	Att	Yds	Avg	TD
2012	Navy	**13**	8	6–2	61	108	**56.5**	898	8.3	**9**	2	150.1	162	649	4.0	10
2013	Navy	**13**	**13**	9–4	**68**	**128**	53.1	1,057	8.3	8	2	140.0	**300**	1,346	4.5	**31**
2014	Navy	11	11	6–5	52	111	46.8	843	7.6	6	**3**	123.1	250	1,191	4.8	23
2015	Navy	**13**	**13**	**11–2**	61	115	53.0	**1,203**	**10.5**	8	1	**162.1**	265	**1,373**	**5.2**	24
Career		50	45	32–13	242	462	52.4	4,001	8.7	31	8	143.8	977	4,559	4.7	88

== Professional career ==
=== Pre-draft ===
Pre-draft measurables
Height	Weight	Arm length	Hand span	40-yard dash	10-yard split	20-yard split	Vertical jump	Broad jump	Bench press
5 ft 9 1/2 in (1.77 m)	190 lb (86 kg)	30 1/4 in (0.77 m)	8 5/8 in (0.22 m)	4.57 s	1.62 s	2.64 s	37.0 in (0.94 m)	10 ft 0 in (3.05 m)	15 reps
All values from Navy's Pro Day

Reynolds was not invited to the NFL Scouting Combine, but worked out as a wide receiver with the Tennessee Titans and New England Patriots, while also attending a pro day with the Baltimore Ravens.

=== Baltimore Ravens ===
In the 2016 NFL draft, the Baltimore Ravens selected Reynolds in the sixth round with the 182nd overall pick.

On September 3, 2016, Reynolds was released by the Ravens during final team cuts and was signed to the practice squad the following day. He was promoted to the active roster on December 30 for the final game of the season. However, he was on the inactive list for the game, and became an exclusive rights free agent after the season.

Reynolds signed his exclusive rights free agent one-year contract tender with the Ravens on April 26, 2017. On September 1, he was waived by the Ravens during final roster cuts.

=== Washington Redskins ===
On November 8, 2017, Reynolds was signed to the Washington Redskins' practice squad.

=== Seattle Seahawks ===
On May 16, 2018, Reynolds signed with the Seattle Seahawks. He was waived on September 1, and was re-signed to the team's practice squad. Reynolds was promoted to the active roster on September 12. Reynolds made his NFL debut five days later in the Seahawks' 24–17 loss to the Chicago Bears. He was waived on October 13 and was subsequently re-signed to the practice squad. Reynolds was promoted to the active roster on November 24, but was waived three days later and re-signed back to the practice squad.

On January 7, 2019, Reynolds signed a reserve/future contract with the Seahawks. He spent the 2019 training camp competing to replace the retiring Doug Baldwin, but lost to John Ursua and was waived on August 31.

=== Seattle Dragons ===
In October 2019, Reynolds was selected by the Seattle Dragons of the XFL in the 2020 XFL draft. Dragons head coach Jim Zorn described Reynolds as his "secret weapon", playing receiver, returner, and emergency quarterback.

Prior to the start of the 2020 XFL season, he was named a team captain on special teams. In Seattle's first game against the DC Defenders, Reynolds returned the opening kickoff and caught an extra point as the Dragons lost 31–19. He had his contract terminated when the league suspended operations on April 10, 2020.

== Naval career ==
Keenan Reynolds
- Military career
- Allegiance: United States
- Branch: United States Navy
- Service years: 2016–present
- Rank: Lieutenant (junior grade)

Reynolds graduated from the United States Naval Academy in May 2016. To dedicate more time to playing professional football, he currently serves in the U.S. Navy Reserve as a lieutenant junior grade. He is a cryptologic warfare officer in the Naval Reserves; he had considered becoming a naval flight officer after the Academy, but elected to enter intelligence after the Navy revised its eligibility policies for the field.

== Broadcasting ==
Reynolds returned to college football in 2019 as an analyst for CBS Sports Network.

In 2025, he joined the Navy Football Radio Network as a pre-game analyst and a radio color commentator for Midshipmen home games.

== See also ==
- List of NCAA football records
- List of NCAA Division I FBS career rushing touchdowns leaders
- List of NCAA major college football yearly scoring leaders
