= 2013 Navy Midshipmen football team =

American college football season

2013 Navy Midshipmen football
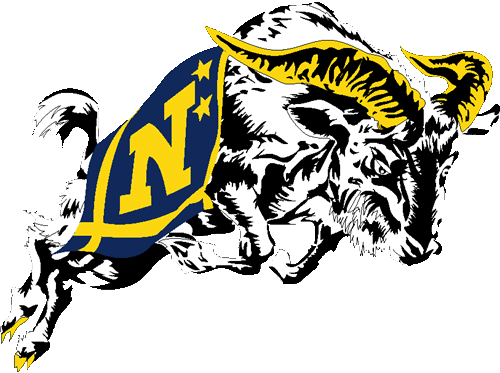

Armed Forces Bowl champion

Armed Forces Bowl, W 24–6 vs. Middle Tennessee
- Conference: Independent
- Record: 9–4
- Head coach: Ken Niumatalolo (6th season)
- Offensive coordinator: Ivin Jasper (6th season)
- Offensive scheme: Triple option
- Defensive coordinator: Buddy Green (12th season)
- Base defense: Multiple
- MVP: Keenan Reynolds
- Captains: Matt Aiken; Cody Peterson
- Home stadium: Navy–Marine Corps Memorial Stadium

2013 NCAA Division I FBS independents football records
| | Conf. | | | Overall |
| Team | W | | L | W | | L |
|---|---|---|---|---|---|---|
| No. 20 Notre Dame* | | – | | 9 | – | 4 |
| Navy | | – | | 9 | – | 4 |
| BYU | | – | | 8 | – | 5 |
| Army | | – | | 3 | – | 9 |
| New Mexico State | | – | | 2 | – | 10 |
| Idaho | | – | | 1 | – | 11 |
*All wins for Notre Dame (9–4) in the 2013 season were later vacated; Rankings from AP Poll

The 2013 Navy Midshipmen football team represented the United States Naval Academy as an independent in the 2013 NCAA Division I FBS football season. The Midshipmen were led by a sixth-year head coach Ken Niumatalolo and played their home games at Navy–Marine Corps Memorial Stadium.

== Schedule ==
| Date | Time | Opponent | Site | TV | Result | Attendance |
|---|---|---|---|---|---|---|
| September 7 | 6:00 p.m. | at Indiana | Memorial Stadium; Bloomington, IN | BTN | W 41–35 | 47,013 |
| September 14 | 3:30 p.m. | Delaware | Navy–Marine Corps Memorial Stadium; Annapolis, MD | CBSSN | W 51–7 | 36,208 |
| September 28 | 7:00 p.m. | at Western Kentucky | Houchens Industries–L. T. Smith Stadium; Bowling Green, KY | ESPNews | L 7–19 | 19,813 |
| October 5 | 11:30 a.m. | Air Force | Navy–Marine Corps Memorial Stadium; Annapolis, MD (Commander-in-Chief's Trophy) | CBS | W 28–10 | 38,225 |
| October 12 | 12:30 p.m. | at Duke | Wallace Wade Stadium; Durham, NC | ESPN3 | L 7–35 | 23,749 |
| October 19 | 7:00 p.m. | at Toledo | Glass Bowl; Toledo, OH | ESPNews | L 44–45 ^{2OT} | 18,221 |
| October 26 | 1:00 p.m. | Pittsburgh | Navy–Marine Corps Memorial Stadium; Annapolis, MD | CBSSN | W 24–21 | 37,094 |
| November 2 | 3:30 p.m. | at Notre Dame | Notre Dame Stadium; Notre Dame, IN (rivalry) | NBC | L 34–38 | 80,795 |
| November 9 | 3:30 p.m. | Hawaii | Navy–Marine Corps Memorial Stadium; Annapolis, MD | CBSSN | W 42–28 | 33,327 |
| November 16 | 3:30 p.m. | South Alabama | Navy–Marine Corps Memorial Stadium; Annapolis, MD | CBSSN | W 42–14 | 33,086 |
| November 22 | 9:30 p.m. | at San Jose State | Spartan Stadium; San Jose, CA | ESPN2 | W 58–52 ^{3OT} | 16,876 |
| December 14 | 3:00 p.m. | vs. Army | Lincoln Financial Field; Philadelphia, PA (Army–Navy Game) | CBS | W 34–7 | 65,612 |
| December 30 | 11:45 a.m. | vs. Middle Tennessee | Amon G. Carter Stadium; Fort Worth, TX (Armed Forces Bowl) | ESPN | W 24–6 | 39,246 |
All times are in Eastern time

== Game summaries ==
=== At Indiana ===
| Team | 1 | 2 | 3 | 4 | Total |
|---|---|---|---|---|---|
| • Navy | 14 | 10 | 14 | 3 | 41 |
| Indiana | 0 | 14 | 7 | 14 | 35 |

=== Delaware ===
| Team | 1 | 2 | 3 | 4 | Total |
|---|---|---|---|---|---|
| Delaware | 0 | 7 | 0 | 0 | 7 |
| • Navy | 10 | 13 | 14 | 14 | 51 |

=== At WKU ===
| Team | 1 | 2 | 3 | 4 | Total |
|---|---|---|---|---|---|
| Navy | 7 | 0 | 0 | 0 | 7 |
| • Western Kentucky | 0 | 3 | 7 | 9 | 19 |

=== Air Force ===
| Team | 1 | 2 | 3 | 4 | Total |
|---|---|---|---|---|---|
| Air Force | 3 | 7 | 0 | 0 | 10 |
| • Navy | 0 | 7 | 7 | 14 | 28 |

=== At Duke ===
| Team | 1 | 2 | 3 | 4 | Total |
|---|---|---|---|---|---|
| Navy | 0 | 7 | 0 | 0 | 7 |
| • Duke | 0 | 14 | 14 | 7 | 35 |

=== Toledo ===
| Team | 1 | 2 | 3 | 4 | OT | 2OT | Total |
|---|---|---|---|---|---|---|---|
| Navy | 7 | 7 | 7 | 10 | 7 | 6 | 44 |
| • Toledo | 3 | 7 | 14 | 7 | 7 | 7 | 45 |

=== Pittsburgh ===
| Team | 1 | 2 | 3 | 4 | Total |
|---|---|---|---|---|---|
| Pittsburgh | 3 | 10 | 0 | 8 | 21 |
| • Navy | 0 | 7 | 0 | 17 | 24 |

=== At Notre Dame ===
| Team | 1 | 2 | 3 | 4 | Total |
|---|---|---|---|---|---|
| Navy | 7 | 13 | 0 | 14 | 34 |
| • #25 Notre Dame | 10 | 7 | 7 | 14 | 38 |

=== Hawaii ===
| Team | 1 | 2 | 3 | 4 | Total |
|---|---|---|---|---|---|
| Hawaii | 0 | 14 | 0 | 14 | 28 |
| • Navy | 7 | 7 | 14 | 14 | 42 |

=== South Alabama ===
| Team | 1 | 2 | 3 | 4 | Total |
|---|---|---|---|---|---|
| South Alabama | 7 | 7 | 0 | 0 | 14 |
| • Navy | 3 | 17 | 7 | 15 | 42 |

=== At San Jose State ===
| Team | 1 | 2 | 3 | 4 | OT | 2OT | 3OT | Total |
|---|---|---|---|---|---|---|---|---|
| • Navy | 0 | 10 | 14 | 14 | 7 | 7 | 6 | 58 |
| San Jose State | 3 | 13 | 6 | 16 | 7 | 7 | 0 | 52 |

=== Vs. Army ===
| Team | 1 | 2 | 3 | 4 | Total |
|---|---|---|---|---|---|
| Army | 0 | 0 | 7 | 0 | 7 |
| • Navy | 3 | 14 | 3 | 14 | 34 |

=== Vs. Middle Tennessee (Bell Helicopter Armed Forces Bowl) ===
| Team | 1 | 2 | 3 | 4 | Total |
|---|---|---|---|---|---|
| Middle Tennessee | 3 | 3 | 0 | 0 | 6 |
| • Navy | 7 | 3 | 0 | 14 | 24 |

== Personnel ==
=== Roster ===
2013 Navy Midshipmen football team roster
Players
Coaches
Offense

| Pos. | # | Name | Class |
|---|---|---|---|
| QB | 2 | Ralph Montalvo | So |
| QB | 4 | Kody Akers | Jr |
| QB | 7 | Nick Fabrizio | Fr |
| QB | 8 | Will Worth | Fr |
| QB | 9 | Kenneth Mouton | Fr |
| QB | 10 | John Hendrick | Jr |
| WR | 13 | Julian Turner | Fr |
| QB | 14 | Troy Thompson | Fr |
| QB | 19 | Keenan Reynolds | So |
| WR | 26 | Shawn Lynch | Jr |
| WR | 28 | Casey Bolena | Jr |
| WR | 28 | Jonathan Gazaille | Sr |
| WR | 28 | Marc Meier | So |
| FB | 32 | Quentin Ezell | So |
| FB | 33 | Shawn White | Fr |
| FB | 34 | Noah Copeland | Jr |
| FB | 36 | Quinton Singleton | Jr |
| FB | 37 | Chris Swain | So |
| WR | 46 | David Frechette | So |
| FB | 48 | Will Huntsman | So |
| WR | 49 | Bryson Garcia | So |
| WR | 80 | Hayden Maples | Sr |
| WR | 81 | Brenden Dudeck | Jr |
| WR | 83 | Devin Crayton | So |
| WR | 84 | Brantley Horton | Sr |
| WR | 85 | Matt Aiken (C) | Sr |
| WR | 86 | Jamir Tillman | Fr |
| WR | 87 | Shawn Lynch | Sr |
| WR | 88 | Casey Bolena | Sr |
| WR | 89 | Thomas Wilson | So |
| WR | 90 | Trey Fullilove | Fr |

Defense

| Pos. | # | Name | Class |
|---|---|---|---|
| CB | 1 | Brendon Clements | Fr |
| CB | 2 | Parrish Gaines | Jr |
| SB | 3 | Bradley Bostick | So |
| CB | 3 | Lonnie Richardson | Jr |
| CB | 4 | Eric Johnson | Sr |
| SB | 5 | Albrey Felder | Sr |
| CB | 5 | Quincy Adams | So |
| S | 6 | Kyle Battle | Fr |
| CB | 7 | Shelley White | So |
| S | 8 | Wave Ryder | Sr |
| CB | 9 | Myer Krah | So |
| S | 10 | Jack Brodowicz | Fr |
| OLB | 13 | Jordan Drake | So |
| SB | 15 | Dishan Romine | Fr |
| S | 15 | Lorentez Barbour | So |
| SB | 16 | Ruben Carson | Jr |
| CB | 17 | Kwazel Bertrand | So |
| S | 19 | Brandon Boyd | So |
| SB | 20 | Darius Staten | Sr |
| OLB | 20 | Nnamdi Uzoma | Sr |
| S | 21 | Amari Ross | Fr |
| SB | 21 | DeBrandon Sanders | So |
| OLB | 22 | Mike Kelly | Fr |
| SB | 22 | Toneo Gulley | Fr |
| S | 23 | Chris Ferguson | Jr |
| SB | 23 | Myles Swain | Fr |
| SB | 24 | Ryan William-Jenkins | Jr |
| S | 24 | Roddy Reyna | So |
| SB | 25 | Demond Brown | So |
| S | 25 | Cameron Bryant | Fr |
| SB | 26 | Marcus Thomas | Sr |
| S | 28 | Edward Robinson | So |
| S | 28 | Daiquan Thomasson | Fr |
| SB | 29 | Geoffrey Whiteside | Jr |
| SB | 31/18 | Tago Smith (Note: Switched to QB on 9/28) | Fr |
| OLB | 32 | Tyler Lehrke | So |
| LB | 33 | Maika Polamalu | Jr |
| OLB | 35 | Nick Martinez | So |
| SB | 35 | Derek Mann | Fr |
| S | 35 | George Jamison | So |
| CB | 37 | Jamaal Williams | So |
| LB | 36 | Jalen Wade | Fr |
| OLB | 38 | William Tuider | Fr |
| S | 39 | Shakir Robinson | Jr |
| OLB | 40 | Josiah Powell | Fr |
| SB | 41 | Ed Royds | So |
| SB | 41 | Will McKamey | So |
| OLB | 41 | Kikau Pescaia | So |
| S | 42 | George Jamison | Jr |
| DE | 42 | Kendrick Mouton | Fr |
| LB | 43 | Michael Huf | Sr |
| WR | 44 | Bob Marshburn | Fr |
| OLB | 44 | Obi Uzoma | Jr |
| SB | 45 | Collin Osborne | So |
| DE | 45 | Paul Quessenberry | Jr |
| OLB | 46 | Chris Johnson | Jr |
| SB | 47 | Calvin Cass Jr. | Fr |
| DE | 47 | A.K. Akpunku | So |
| LB | 48 | Daniel Gonzales | Fr |
| LB | 49 | Anthony Lewis | Jr |
| LB | 50 | Don Pearson | So |
| C | 50 | Maurice Morris | Fr |
| LB | 51 | James Britton | Jr |
| LB | 52 | D.J. Sargenti | Sr |
| G | 52 | Zach Laniewski | So |
| LB | 53 | Cody Peterson (C) | Sr |
| LB | 54 | Tyler Goble | So |
| LB | 55 | Michael Tuimavave | Sr |
| LB | 56 | Joe Worth | Jr |
| LB | 56 | Blake Copeland | Fr |
| OT | 57 | E.K. Binns | So |
| G | 57 | Alex Brown | So |
| OT | 58 | Corin Cline | Fr |
| DE | 58 | Evan Palelei | Sr |
| LB | 59 | Ryan Harris | Fr |
| DE | 60 | Rex Montes | So |
| OT | 60 | Ben Tamburello | So |
| OT | 61 | Brandon Greene | So |
| OT | 62 | Bradyn Heap | Jr |
| C | 63 | Blaze Ryder | So |
| NG | 64 | Patrick Forrestal | Fr |
| G | 64 | Jake Zuzek | Jr |
| OT | 65 | Joey Gastom | So |
| DE | 65 | Cole Wright | Fr |
| G | 66 | Jeremiah Robbins | Fr |
| OT | 67 | Nathaniel Otto | Jr |
| NG | 67 | Rob Dusz | Fr |
| DE | 68 | Peter Igras | So |
| NG | 69 | Barry Dabney | Sr |
| OT | 69 | Patrick Hoffman | Fr |
| OT | 70 | Graham Vickers | Sr |
| DE | 71 | Cam Henson | Fr |
| G | 71 | Thomas Stone | Sr |
| C | 72 | Adam West | Fr |
| NG | 72 | Travis Bridges | Sr |
| OT | 73 | Sam Womack | Sr |
| G | 74 | Eric Mahler | Sr |
| DE | 74 | John Ferguson | Fr |
| C | 75 | Tanner Flemming | Jr |
| OT | 76 | Blake Benjamin | So |
| OT | 77 | Andrew Martin | Fr |
| NG | 77 | Benard Sarra | So |
| G | 78 | Kyle Cregge | Jr |
| OT | 79 | Matthew Van Halanger | Sr |
| OLB | 84 | Mason Amos | Fr |
| LB | 85 | Nick McCrory | So |
| LB | 86 | Zach Hester | So |
| LB | 88 | Ted Colburn | Fr |
| DE | 90 | Will Anthony | So |
| DE | 91 | Aaron Davis | Fr |
| DE | 92 | David Gordeuk | So |
| NG | 94 | Vin Rider | Jr |
| DE | 95 | Chris Nurthen | Jr |
| DE | 96 | Carter Shipley | Fr |
| DE | 97 | Austin Kurke | Fr |
| NG | 98 | A.J. Barnaby | Jr |
| DE | 99 | Sean Reaver | So |

Special teams

| Pos. | # | Name | Class |
|---|---|---|---|
| K | 1 | Grant Jackson | Fr |
| K | 6 | Nick Sloan | So |
| P | 11 | Pablo Beltran | Jr |
| P | 16 | Gavin Jernigan | So |
| K | 17 | Andrew Mitchell | Fr |
| K | 18 | Colin Amerau | Jr |
| P | 39 | Alex Barta | Jr |
| K | 43 | Austin Grebe | So |
| LS | 82 | Justin Haan | Sr |
| K | 91 | Kyle O'Conner | Fr |
| K | 92 | Max Lee | Fr |
| LS | 93 | Joe Cardona | Jr |
| LS | 94 | Josh Antol | Fr |

Head coach

- Ken Niumatalolo

Coordinators/assistant coaches

- Chris Culton – Offensive line
- Justin Davis – Outside linebackers
- Tony Grantham – Outside linebackers
- Buddy Green – Defensive coordinator/Secondary
- Ashley Ingram – Offensive line
- Ivin Jasper – Offensive coordinator/quarterbacks
- Steve Johns – Inside linebackers/special teams
- Keith Jones – Secondary
- Mike Judge – Fullbacks
- Shaun Nua – Defensive line
- Danny O'Rourke – Slot Backs
- Dale Pehrson – Defensive line
- Mick Yokitis – Wide receivers

Legend

- (C) Team captain
- (S) Suspended
- (I) Ineligible
- Injured
- Redshirt

Roster
Last update: November 18, 2013

=== Depth chart ===
The following players comprised the team's Depth chart prior to the 2012 Kraft Fight Hunger Bowl:

Defense

FS
Chris Ferguson
Lonnie Richardson
⋅

| RAID | ILB | ILB | SLB |
|---|---|---|---|
| Jordan Drake | D.J. Sagenti | Cody Peterson | ⋅ |
| Obi Uzoma | Maika Polamalu | James Britton | ⋅ |
| ⋅ | ⋅ | ⋅ | ⋅ |

ROV
Wave Ryder
George Jamison
⋅

CB
Brendon Clements
Quincy Adams
⋅

| DE | NT | DE |
|---|---|---|
| Evan Palelei | Benard Sarra | Paul Quessenberry |
| Will Anthony | Travis Bridges | Aaron Davis |
| ⋅ | ⋅ | ⋅ |

CB
Parrish Gaines
Myer Krah
⋅

Offense

WR
Shawn Lynch
Brendan Dudeck
⋅

SB
Geoffrey Whiteside
DeBrandon Sanders
⋅

| LT | LG | C | RG | RT |
|---|---|---|---|---|
| Bradyn Heap | Thomas Stone | Tanner Fleming | Jake Zuzek | Graham Vickers |
| Joey Gaston | E.K. Binns | Blaze Ryder | Nathaniel Otto | Brandon Greene |
| ⋅ | ⋅ | ⋅ | ⋅ | ⋅ |

SB
Darius Staten
Marus Thomas
⋅

WR
Casey Bolena
Matt Akien
⋅

QB
Keenan Reynolds
John Hendrick
Tago Smith (Switched from SB to QB on 9/28)

FB
Chris Swain
Noah Copeland
⋅

Special teams
PK Nick Sloan
PK Austin Grebe
P Pablo Beltran
P Justin Haan
KR Marcus Thomas
PR Shawn Lynch
LS Joe Cardona
H Pablo Beltran
