= 2026 Liberty Bowl =

Postseason college football bowl game

2026 AutoZone Liberty Bowl
- 67th Liberty Bowl
Navy Midshipmen	Cincinnati Bearcats
(10–2)	(7–5)
American	Big 12
35	13
Head coach: Brian Newberry	Head coach: Scott Satterfield
AP / Coaches / CFP; 22 / 25 / NR
	1	2	3	4	Total
Navy	7	7	7	14	35
Cincinnati	0	7	0	6	13
- Date: January 2, 2026
- Season: 2025
- Stadium: Simmons Bank Liberty Stadium
- Location: Memphis, Tennessee
- MVP: Blake Horvath (QB, Navy)
- Favorite: Navy by 7
- Referee: David Smith (SEC)
- Attendance: 21,908

United States TV coverage
- Network: ESPN; ESPN Radio
- Announcers: Mike Monaco (play-by-play), Kirk Morrison (analyst), and Dawn Davenport (sideline) (ESPN); Chris Carlin (play-by-play), Rocky Boiman (analyst) and Marion Crowder (sideline) (ESPN Radio)

The 2026 Liberty Bowl was a college football bowl game played on January 2, 2026, at Simmons Bank Liberty Stadium located in Memphis, Tennessee. The 67th annual Liberty Bowl game began at approximately 3:30 p.m. CST and aired on ESPN. It was one of the 2025–26 bowl games concluding the 2025 FBS football season. The game was sponsored by automotive parts and accessories retailer AutoZone and was officially known as the AutoZone Liberty Bowl.

The Navy Midshipmen of the American Conference defeated the Cincinnati Bearcats of the Big 12 Conference, 35–13.

== Teams ==
The game featured Navy from the American Conference and Cincinnati from the Big 12 Conference. This was their seventh meeting, and first since 2022 when both teams were members of the American Athletic Conference (an earlier name of the American Conference). The teams split their prior games, 3–3, with Navy winning their first three meetings (1940, 1956, 2017) and Cincinnati winning the next three (2018, 2021, 2022).

=== Navy Midshipmen ===
Navy compiled a 10–2 record during their regular season, losing only to North Texas and Notre Dame in back-to-back games in early November. The Midshipmen defeated one ranked team, South Florida, and secured a one-point victory over rival Army on December 13. Navy entered the Liberty Bowl ranked 22nd in the AP poll.

=== Cincinnati Bearcats ===
Cincinnati opened their season with a loss to Nebraska then won seven games in a row, including a win over No. 14 Iowa State. After bring ranked as high as 17th, the Bearcats ended their regular season with four consecutive losses, two of which were to ranked teams, Utah and BYU. Cincinnati entered the Liberty Bowl unranked and with an overall 7–5 record.

== Game summary ==
2026 AutoZone Liberty Bowl

Quarter	1	2	3	4	Total
Navy	7	7	7	14	35
Cincinnati	0	7	0	6	13

at Simmons Bank Liberty Stadium • Memphis, Tennessee

- Date: Friday, January 2, 2026
- Game time: 3:30 p.m. CST
- Game weather: Rain • Temperature: 52 °F (11 °C) • Wind: 8 mph (13 km/h) north
- Game attendance: 21,908
- Referee: Jordan Guest
- TV announcers (ESPN): Mike Monaco (play-by-play), Kirk Morrison (analyst), and Dawn Davenport (sideline)
- Box score

=== Statistics ===
Statistics	NAVY	CIN
First downs	22	12
Plays–yards	349	239
Rushes–yards	51–241	38–142
Passing yards	108	97
Passing: comp–att–int	9–15–0	12–20–1
Turnovers		
Time of possession	33:42	26:18

Team	Category	Player	Statistics
Navy	Passing	Blake Horvath	9/15, 108 yards, 2 TD
Navy	Rushing	Alex Tecza	16 carries, 80 yards, TD
Navy	Receiving	Eli Heidenreich	5 receptions, 64 yards, TD
Cincinnati	Passing	Brady Lichtenberg	10/15, 78 yards, TD, INT
Cincinnati	Rushing	Manny Covey	11 carries, 78 yards
Cincinnati	Receiving	Manny Covey	5 receptions, 28 yards
