= Blake Horvath =

American football player (born 2004)

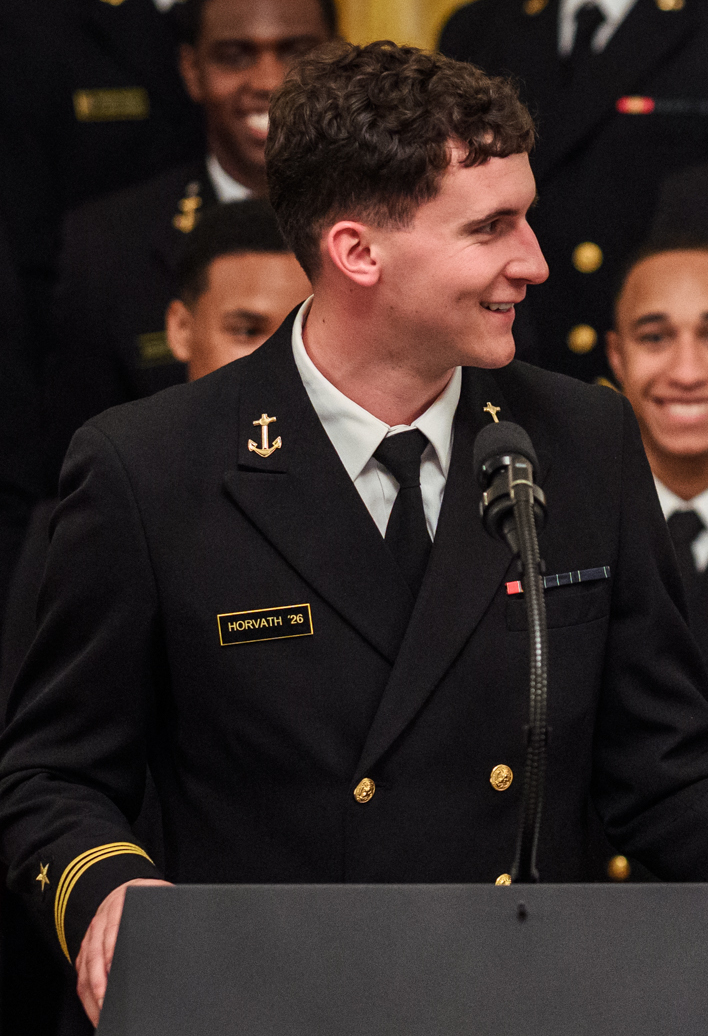
- Horvath at the White House in 2026

No. 11
- Position: Quarterback

Personal information
- Born: January 28, 2004 (age 22); Hilliard, Ohio, U.S.
- Listed height: 6 ft 0 in (1.83 m)
- Listed weight: 194 lb (88 kg)

Career information
- High school: Hilliard Darby (Hilliard, Ohio)
- College: Navy (2022–2025)

Awards and highlights
- Third-team All-AAC (2025); Liberty Bowl MVP (2026); Armed Forces Bowl MVP (2024)
- Stats at ESPN

Blake Horvath (born January 28, 2004) is a United States Navy sailor and former college football quarterback for the Navy Midshipmen.

== Early life ==
Horvath attended Hilliard Darby High School in Hilliard, Ohio. Coming out of high school, he committed to play college football for the Navy Midshipmen.

== College career ==
In Horvath's first collegiate season in 2022, he did not appear in any games for the Midshipmen. He made his first career start in week five of the 2023 season, where he ran for 88 yards on 18 carries before leaving the game in the second quarter with a season-ending hand injury. Horvath finished the 2023 season completing six of his twelve pass attempts for 84 yards and two touchdowns, while also adding 37 carries for 183 yards on the ground.

Heading into the 2024 season, Horvath was named the Midshipmen's starting quarterback. In week two, he completed five of his nine passes for 112 yards and a touchdown, while also rushing for 122 yards and three touchdowns, as he led Navy to a win over Temple. During week four, Horvath completed nine of his 12 pass attempts for 192 yards and two touchdowns, while also adding 211 yards and four touchdowns on the ground, as he helped the Midshipmen upset Memphis. In the Army–Navy Game to end the regular season, Horvath combined for 311 total yards and four touchdowns (threw for 107 yards and two touchdowns, and ran for 204 yards and two scores) as the Midshipmen defeated Army's tenth-ranked defense 31–13. Horvath led Navy to victory over Oklahoma in the 2024 Armed Forces Bowl with a school-record 95-yard touchdown run and the go-ahead six-yard score to secure a 21–20 win; he was named the game's most valuable player.

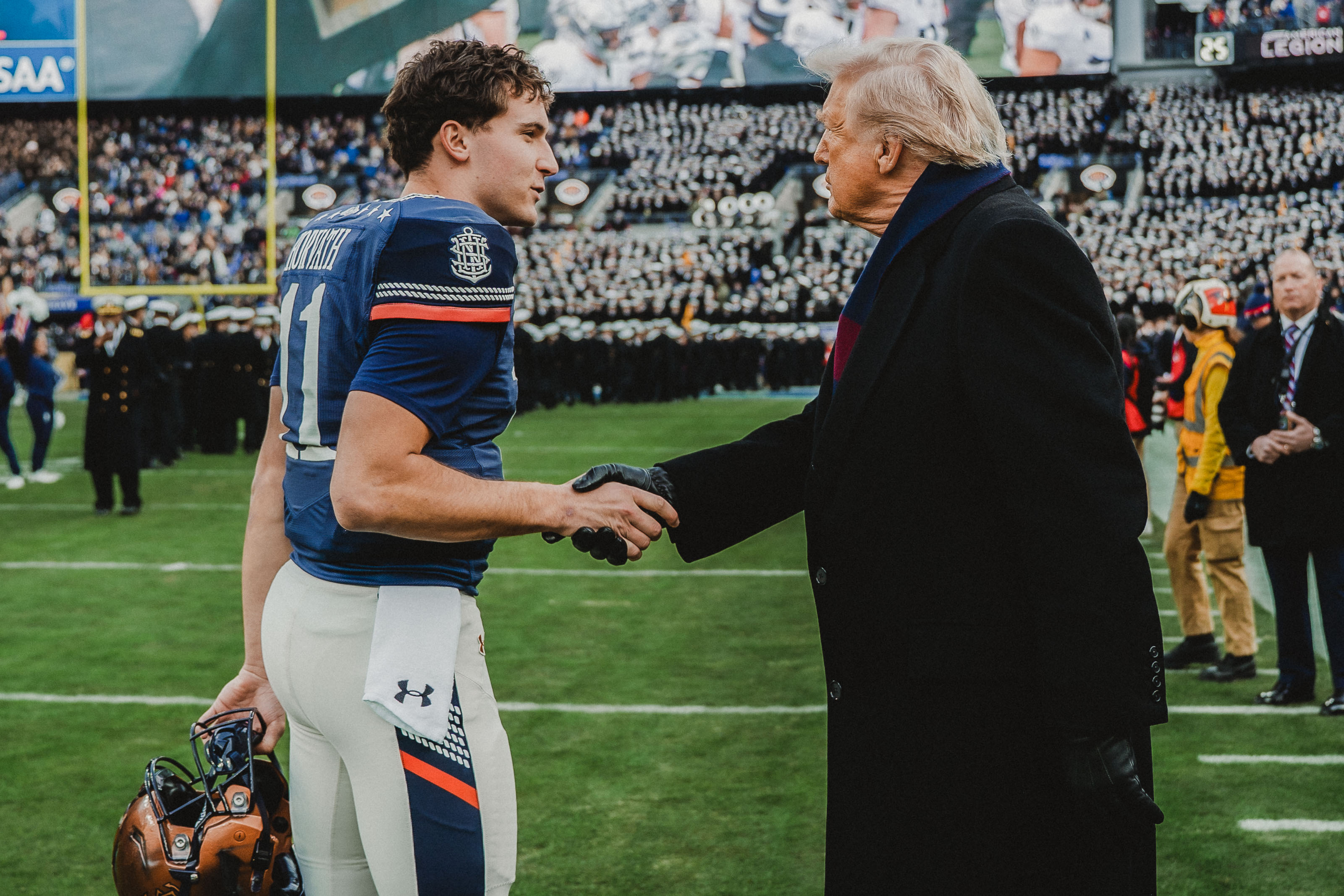
Horvath meeting President Donald Trump at the 2025 Army–Navy Game

Horvath began his senior season as part of the Davey O'Brien Award's Class of 2025 and on the preseason watchlists for honors like the Manning and Maxwell Awards. He led Navy to their first 7–0 start since 1978. One of the wins during the streak was a 34–31 victory over Air Force, where Horvath recorded a school-best 469 total yards including 339 passing (fifth most in Navy history) and three touchdowns while rushing for 130 yards and another score. The passing performance was viewed as anomalous for the traditionally run-heavy Midshipmen, which offensive coordinator Drew Cronic credited to Horvath excelling in his "millennial Wing T" offense. In a loss to North Texas, he suffered an upper body injury that kept him out for the following game against Notre Dame. He also hurt his leg while playing South Florida. The injuries hampered a campaign that otherwise saw him be named a potential finalist for the Heisman Trophy and a semifinalist for the O'Brien and Walter Camp Awards. Horvath struggled against Army as he fumbled three times, one of which was recovered by Army, and had an interception by Justin Weaver returned for a touchdown before being overturned because Weaver was down. Amid his difficulties, he ran for a touchdown and threw another to Eli Heidenreich on fourth down to rally Navy from a 16–7 deficit. While leading 17–16, Horvath briefly fumbled again but caught the ball and dove for the game-sealing first down. In a rainy Liberty Bowl against Cincinnati, Horvath threw for two touchdowns and 108 yards while rushing for a third score, earning him MVP honors as the Midshipmen won 35–13.

He majored in operations research.

=== College statistics ===
Season	Team	Games			Passing								Rushing			
Season	Team	GP	GS	Record	Cmp	Att	Pct	Yds	Avg	TD	Int	Rtg	Att	Yds	Avg	TD
2022	Navy	0	0	—	DNP											
2023	Navy	4	1	1–0	6	12	50.0	84	7.0	2	0	163.8	37	183	4.9	0
2024	Navy	12	12	9−3	80	139	57.6	1,353	9.7	13	4	164.4	175	1,246	7.1	17
2025	Navy	12	12	11−1	97	160	60.6	1,580	9.9	12	6	160.8	224	1,200	5.4	16
Career		28	25	21–4	183	311	58.8	3,017	9.7	27	10	162.5	436	2,629	6.0	33

== Professional football and military service ==
Pre-draft measurables
Height	Weight	Arm length	Hand span	Wingspan	40-yard dash	10-yard split	20-yard split	20-yard shuttle	Three-cone drill	Vertical jump	Broad jump
6 ft 0 1/2 in (1.84 m)	194 lb (88 kg)	30 3/4 in (0.78 m)	9 5/8 in (0.24 m)	6 ft 2 1/4 in (1.89 m)	4.64 s	1.58 s	2.64 s	4.45 s	6.74 s	33.5 in (0.85 m)	9 ft 11 in (3.02 m)
All values from Pro Day

Despite his successes at Navy, Horvath was not expected to be picked in the 2026 NFL draft since his repertoire—which focused more on running than throwing—was considered unfit for professional quarterbacks. Horvath likewise opined that getting drafted would be a dream but he would "be content with my career" regardless of whether it was in the military or National Football League. He participated in both quarterback and wide receiver drills at Navy's Pro Day, followed by attending a local Pro Day organized by the Washington Commanders.

Horvath graduated from the Naval Academy on May 22, 2026. He commissioned as a naval aviator.

== Personal life ==
Horvath is a fan of Harry Potter. He is a whistler.
