= 2023 Navy Midshipmen football team =

American college football season

2023 Navy Midshipmen football
- Conference: American Athletic Conference
- Record: 5–7 (4–4 AAC)
- Head coach: Brian Newberry (1st season)
- Offensive coordinator: Grant Chesnut (1st season)
- Offensive scheme: Triple option
- Defensive coordinator: P. J. Volker (1st season)
- Base defense: 4–2–5
- Home stadium: Navy–Marine Corps Memorial Stadium

2023 American Athletic Conference football standings
	Conf.			Overall
Team	W		L	W		L
No. 22 SMU y$	8	–	0	11	–	3
Tulane y	8	–	0	11	–	3
UTSA	7	–	1	9	–	4
Memphis	6	–	2	10	–	3
South Florida	4	–	4	7	–	6
Rice	4	–	4	6	–	7
Navy	4	–	4	5	–	7
North Texas	3	–	5	5	–	7
UAB	3	–	5	4	–	8
Florida Atlantic	3	–	5	4	–	8
Charlotte	2	–	6	3	–	9
Tulsa	2	–	6	4	–	8
Temple	1	–	7	3	–	9
East Carolina	1	–	7	2	–	10
Championship: SMU 26, Tulane 14
$ – Conference champion; y – Championship game participant; Rankings from AP Poll

The 2023 Navy Midshipmen football team represented the United States Naval Academy in the 2023 NCAA Division I FBS football season. The Midshipmen played their home games at Navy–Marine Corps Memorial Stadium in Annapolis, Maryland, and competed in the American Athletic Conference (The American). They were led by first-year head coach Brian Newberry. The Navy Midshipmen football team drew an average home attendance of 30,804 in 2023.

== Offseason ==
=== Coaching changes ===
With Newberry taking over as head coach, there were several other coaching changes. On December 20, 2022, the Midshipmen promoted linebackers coach P. J. Volker to defensive coordinator while remaining linebackers coach. On January 5, 2023, the school hired Grant Chesnut to be the offensive coordinator. He held the same position at Kennesaw State for eight years. On January 9, Eric Lewis was named the school's safeties coach and defensive pass game coordinator; Brenten Wimberly was also named a defensive assistant.

== Schedule ==
Navy and the American Athletic Conference (AAC) announced the 2023 football schedule on February 21, 2023.

Date	Time	Opponent	Site	TV	Result	Attendance
August 26	2:30 p.m.	vs. No. 13 Notre Dame*	Aviva Stadium; Dublin, Ireland (Aer Lingus College Football Classic, Rivalry)	NBC	L 3–42	49,000
September 9	3:30 p.m.	Wagner*	Navy–Marine Corps Memorial Stadium; Annapolis, MD	CBSSN	W 24–0	29,798
September 14	7:30 p.m.	at Memphis	Simmons Bank Liberty Stadium; Memphis, TN	ESPN	L 24–28	25,551
September 30	3:30 p.m.	South Florida	Navy–Marine Corps Memorial Stadium; Annapolis, MD	CBSSN	L 30–44	29,789
October 7	3:30 p.m.	North Texas	Navy–Marine Corps Memorial Stadium; Annapolis, MD	CBSSN	W 27–24	28,648
October 14	2:00 p.m.	at Charlotte	Jerry Richardson Stadium; Charlotte, NC	ESPN+	W 14–0	15,659
October 21	12:00 p.m.	No. 22 Air Force*	Navy–Marine Corps Memorial Stadium; Annapolis, MD (Commander-in-Chief's Trophy)	CBS	L 6–17	38,803 (Note: 38,803 is the highest all-time attendance record at Navy–Marine Corps Memorial Stadium, breaking the previous record of 38,792 set on October 7, 2017, vs Air Force.)
November 4	2:00 p.m.	at Temple	Lincoln Financial Field; Philadelphia, PA	ESPN+	L 18–32	13,049
November 11	3:30 p.m.	UAB	Navy–Marine Corps Memorial Stadium; Annapolis, MD	CBSSN	W 31–6	29,078
November 18	12:00 p.m.	East Carolina	Navy–Marine Corps Memorial Stadium; Annapolis, MD	ESPNews/ESPN+	W 10–0	28,708
November 25	12:00 p.m.	at SMU	Gerald J. Ford Stadium; Dallas, TX (Gansz Trophy)	ESPN2	L 14–59	21,490
December 9	3:00 p.m.	vs. Army*	Gillette Stadium; Foxborough, MA (Army–Navy Game, Commander-in-Chief's Trophy, College GameDay)	CBS	L 11–17	65,878
*Non-conference game; Rankings from AP Poll and CFP Rankings released prior to game; All times are in Eastern time

== Game summaries ==
=== vs Notre Dame (Emerald Isle Classic), (rivalry) ===
Navy Midshipmen (0-0) vs No. 13 Notre Dame Fighting Irish (0-0) – Game summary

Quarter	1	2	3	4	Total
Midshipmen	0	0	0	3	3
No. 13 Fighting Irish	14	7	7	7	35

at Aviva Stadium • Dublin, Ireland

- Date: August 26th
- Game time: 2:30 p.m. EST
- Game weather: Temperature: 59 °F (15 °C) • Weather: Rainy/Cloudy
- Game attendance: 49,000
- Referee: Luke Richman
- TV announcers (NBC): Noah Eagle (play-by-play), Jason Garrett (color commentator), Zora Stephenson (sideline reporter), and Terry McAulay (rules analyst)

Game information

First quarter

- (8:26) ND – Audric Estimé 1-yard rush, Spencer Shrader kick (Drive: 13 plays, 81 yards, 6:28; Notre Dame 7-0)
- (1:03) ND – Jadarian Price 19-yard rush, Spencer Shrader kick (Drive: 7 plays, 63 yards, 3:27; Notre Dame 14-0)

Second quarter

- (10:00) ND – Jaden Greathouse 35-yard pass from Sam Hartman, Spencer Shrader kick (Drive: 4 plays, 78 yards, 1:52; Notre Dame 21-0)
- (0:13) ND – Jayden Thomas 29-yard pass from Sam Hartman, Spencer Shrader kick (Drive: 9 plays, 80 yards, 1:42; Notre Dame 28-0)

Third quarter

- (9:36) ND – Jaden Greathouse 20-yard pass from Sam Hartman, Spencer Shrader kick (Drive: 6 plays, 63 yards, 2:48; Notre Dame 35-0)

Fourth quarter

- (11:54) ND – Deion Colzie 25-yard pass from Sam Hartman, Spencer Shrader kick (Drive: 7 plays, 60 yards, 3:43; Notre Dame 42-0)
- (3:33) Navy – Evan Warren 31-yard field goal (Drive: 15 plays, 62 yards, 8:21; Notre Dame 42-3)

Statistics	Navy	No. 13 Notre Dame
First downs	12	27
Plays–yards	55–169	57–444
Rushes–yards	48—126	32—191
Passing yards	43	253
Passing: comp–att–int	3–7–0	19–23–0
Time of possession	44:35	32:31

Team	Category	Player	Statistics
Navy	Passing	Tai Lavatai	3/6, 43 yards
Navy	Rushing	Alex Tecza	8 carries, 38 yards
Navy	Receiving	Brandon Chatman	2 receptions, 41 yards
No. 13 Notre Dame	Passing	Sam Hartman	19/23, 251 yards, 4 TD
No. 13 Notre Dame	Rushing	Audric Estimé	16 carries, 95 yards, TD
No. 13 Notre Dame	Receiving	Jaden Greathouse	3 receptions, 68 yards, 2 TD

=== vs Wagner (FCS) ===
Wagner Seahawks (FCS) (0-1) vs Navy Midshipmen (0-1) – Game summary

Quarter	1	2	3	4	Total
Seahawks (FCS)	0	0	0	0	0
Midshipmen	7	10	0	7	24

at Navy-Marine Corps Memorial Stadium • Annapolis, Maryland

- Date: September 9th
- Game time: 3:30 p.m. EST
- Game weather: Temperature: 85 °F (29 °C) • Wind: E 10 miles per hour (16 km/h) • Weather: Rainy/Cloudy
- Game attendance: 29,798
- Referee: Darryl DeBerry
- TV announcers (CBSSN): Chick Hernandez (play-by-play), Randy Cross (analyst) & Sheehan Stanwick Burch (sideline)

Game information

First quarter

- (7:46) NAVY – Daba Fofana 3-yard rush, Evan Warren kick (Drive: 7 plays, 77 yards, 3:33; Navy 7-0)

Second quarter

- (2:20) NAVY – Evan Warren 27-yard field goal (Drive: 12 plays, 57 yards, 6:06; Navy 10-0)
- (0:08) NAVY – Camari Williams 8-yard pass from Tai Lavatai, Evan Warren kick (Drive: 5 plays, 80 yards, 0:40; Navy 17-0)

Third quarter

- No scoring this quarter

Fourth quarter

- (10:44) NAVY – Eli Heidenreich 46-yard, Evan Warren kick (Drive: 2 plays, 53 yards, 0:43; Navy 24-0)

Statistics	Wagner (FCS)	Navy
First downs	12	18
Plays–yards	67–227	62–408
Rushes–yards	32–84	44–245
Passing yards	143	163
Passing: comp–att–int	18–35–1	11–18–0
Time of possession	29:18	26:23

Team	Category	Player	Statistics
Wagner (FCS)	Passing	Damien Mazil	11/23, 100 yards, INT
Wagner (FCS)	Rushing	Zachary Palmer-Smith	13 carries, 52 yards
Wagner (FCS)	Receiving	Mark Didio Jr.	8 receptions, 57 yards
Navy	Passing	Tai Lavatai	8/13, 161 yards, TD
Navy	Rushing	Eli Heidenreich	4 carries, 66 yards, TD
Navy	Receiving	Anton Hall Jr.	1 reception, 45 yards

=== at Memphis ===
Navy Midshipmen (1-1) vs Memphis Tigers (2-0) – Game summary

Quarter	1	2	3	4	Total
Midshipmen	14	0	7	3	24
Tigers	7	7	7	7	28

at Simmons Bank Liberty Stadium • Memphis, Tennessee

- Date: September 14th
- Game time: 7:30 p.m. EST
- Game weather: Temperature: 77 °F (25 °C) • Wind: at W 5 miles per hour (8.0 km/h) • Weather: Sunny
- Game attendance: 25,551
- Referee: Kevin Randell
- TV announcers (ESPN): Matt Barrie (play-by-play), Dan Mullen (analyst) & Harry Lyles Jr. (sideline)

Game information

First quarter

- (5:15) MEM – Blake Warson 7-yard run, Seth Morgan kick (Drive: 13 plays, 90 yards, 5:23; Memphis 7-0)
- (5:03) NAVY – Alex Tecza 75-yard run, Evan Warren kick (Drive: 1 play, 75 yards, 0:12; Tied 7-7)
- (1:14) NAVY – Regis Velez 16-yard pass from Tai Lavatai, Evan Warren kick (Drive: 6 plays, 77 yards, 2:50; Navy 14-7)

Second quarter

- (0:23) MEM – Roc Taylor 7-yard pass from Seth Henigan, Seth Morgan kick (Drive: 8 plays, 56 yards, 0:56; Tied 14-14)

Third quarter

- (12:24) MEM – Seth Henigan 1-yard run, Seth Morgan kick (Drive: 7 plays, 47 yards, 2:36; Memphis 21-14)
- (9:08) NAVY – Anton Hall 2-yard run, Evan Warren kick (Drive: 6 plays, 85 yards, 3:12; Tied 21-21)

Fourth quarter

- (14:22) MEM – Seth Henigan 3-yard run, Seth Morgan kick (Drive: 3 plays, 78 yards, 0:58; Memphis 28-21)
- (3:09) NAVY – Nathan Kirkwood 36-yard field goal (Drive: 7 plays, 37 yards, 3:38; Memphis 28-24)

Statistics	Navy	Memphis
First downs	19	19
Plays–yards	70–432	66–408
Rushes–yards	50–299	31–190
Passing yards	133	218
Passing: comp–att–int	10–20–0	23–35–1
Time of possession	32:49	27:11

Team	Category	Player	Statistics
Navy	Passing	Tai Lavatai	10–19–0, 133 yards, TD
Navy	Rushing	Alex Tecza	15 carries, 163 yards, TD
Navy	Receiving	Brandon Chatman	1 reception, 58 yards
Memphis	Passing	Seth Henigan	23–35–1, 218 yards, TD, INT
Memphis	Rushing	Blake Watson	10 carries, 169 yards, TD
Memphis	Receiving	Blake Watson	6 receptions, 68 yards

=== vs South Florida ===
South Florida Bulls (2-2) vs Navy Midshipmen (1-2) – Game summary

Quarter	1	2	3	4	Total
Bulls	7	16	7	14	44
Midshipmen	14	6	3	7	30

at Navy-Marine Corps Memorial Stadium • Annapolis, Maryland

- Date: September 30th
- Game time: 3:30 p.m. EST
- Game weather: Temperature: 72 °F (22 °C) • Wind: NE at 5 miles per hour (8.0 km/h) • Weather: Clear
- Game attendance: 29,789
- Referee: Scott Hardin
- TV announcers (CBSSN): Jordan Kent (play-by-play), Randy Cross (analyst) & Sheehan Stanwick Burch (sideline)

Game information

First quarter

- (11:52) NAVY – Tai Lavatai 1-yard run, Nathan Kirkwood kick (Drive: 4 plays, 18 yards, 1:20; Navy 7-0)
- (8:55) NAVY – Tai Lavatai 4-yard run, Nathan Kirkwood kick (Drive: 4 plays, 30 yards, 1:50; Navy 14-0)
- (5:40) USF – Sean Atkins 1-yard pass from Byrum Brown, John Cannon kick (Drive: 8 plays, 70 yards, 3:14; Navy 14-7)

Second quarter

- (12:09) USF – Nay'Quan Wright 10-yard run, John Cannon kick (Drive: 10 plays, 67 yards, 3:10; Tied 14-14)
- (8:20) USF – Sean Atkins 88-yard pass from Byrum Brown, John Cannon kick (Drive: 2 plays, 88 yards, 0:39; USF 21-14)
- (1:57) NAVY – Anton Hall 2-yard pass from Blake Horvath, PAT blocked (Drive: 5 plays, 22 yards, 2:06; USF 21-20)
- (1:57) USF – Jhalyn Suler 69-yard PAT return (USF 23-20)

Third quarter

- (10:34) NAVY – Nathan Kirkwood 44-yard field goal (Drive: 6 plays, 12 yards, 2:54; Tied 23-23)
- (4:22) USF – Michael Stephens-Brown 15-yard pass from Byrum Brown, John Cannon kick (Drive: 8 plays, 67 yards, 2:52; USF 30-23)

Fourth quarter

- (14:50) USF – Tramel Logan 70-yard fumble recovery, John Cannon kick (USF 37-23)
- (7:45) USF – Michel Dukes 11-yard run, John Cannon kick (Drive: 9 plays, 74 yards, 3:13; USF 44-23)
- (7:28) NAVY – Eli Heidenreich 68-yard pass from Blake Horvath, Nathan Kirkwood kick (Drive: 1 play, 68 yards, 0:17; USF 44-30)

Statistics	South Florida	Navy
First downs	11	24
Plays–yards	59–330	78–435
Rushes–yards	48–240	44–98
Passing yards	90	338
Passing: comp–att–int	5–11–0	26–34–0
Time of possession	31:08	28:52

Team	Category	Player	Statistics
South Florida	Passing	Byrum Brown	26–34, 338 yards, 3 TD
South Florida	Rushing	K'wan Powell	11 carries, 48 yards
South Florida	Receiving	Sean Atkins	4 receptions, 16 yards, 2 TD
Navy	Passing	Blake Horvath	4–6, 83 yards, 2 TD
Navy	Rushing	Alex Tezuka	13 carries, 82 yards
Navy	Receiving	Eli Heidenreich	1 reception, 68 yards

=== vs North Texas ===
North Texas Mean Green (2-2) vs. Navy Midshipmen (1-3) – Game summary

Quarter	1	2	3	4	Total
Mean Green	3	7	0	14	24
Midshipmen	0	13	7	7	27

at Navy-Marine Corps Memorial Stadium • Annapolis, Maryland

- Date: October 7th
- Game time: 3:30 p.m. EST
- Game weather: Temperature: 64 °F (18 °C) • Wind: W at 5 miles per hour (8.0 km/h) • Weather: Cloudy
- Game attendance: 28,648
- Referee: Tim Rich
- TV announcers (CBSSN): John Sadack (play-by-play), Randy Cross (analyst) & Sheehan Stanwick Burch (sideline)

Game information

First quarter

- (2:43) UNT – Noah Rauschenberg 42-yard field goal (Drive: 9 plays, 68 yards, 4:11; North Texas 3-0)

Second quarter

- (7:18) NAVY – Alex Tecza 39-yard run, Nathan Kirkwood kick (Drive: 10 plays, 80 yards, 5:15; Navy 7-3)
- (2:42) UNT – Chandler Rogers 75-yard run, Noah Rauschenberg kick (Drive: 2 plays, 80 yards, 0:37; North Texas 10-7)

Third quarter

- (0:43) NAVY – Nathan Kent 26-yard pass from Tai Lavatai, Nathan Kirkwood missed PAT (Drive: 8 plays, 75 yards, 1:59; Navy 13-10)

Third Quarter

- (8:26) NAVY – Anton Hall 1-yard run, Nathan Kirkwood kick (Drive: 12 plays, 75 yards, 6:34; Navy 20-10)

Fourth quarter

- (13:01) UNT – Ja'Mori Maclin 18-yard pass from Chandler Rogers, Noah Rauschenberg kick (Drive: 14 plays, 93 yards, 4:57; Navy 20-17)
- (7:07) Navy – Alex Tecza 21-yard run, Nathan Kirkwood (Drive: 1 play, 21 yards, 0:06; Navy 27-17)
- (5:23) UNT – Ayo Adeyi 47-yard run, Noah Rauschenberg kick (Drive: 8 plays, 73 yards, 1:44; Navy 27-24)

Statistics	North Texas	Navy
First downs	23	21
Plays–yards	69–473	68–406
Rushes–yards	36–206	58–331
Passing yards	267	75
Passing: comp–att–int	22–33–0	4–10–0
Time of possession	26:05	33:55

Team	Category	Player	Statistics
North Texas	Passing	Chandler Rogers	22–32–0, 267 yards, TD
North Texas	Rushing	Ayo Adeyi	14 carries, 125 yards, TD
North Texas	Receiving	Ja'Mori Maclin	6 receptions, 76 yards, TD
Navy	Passing	Tai Lavatai	4–8–0, 75 yards, TD
Navy	Rushing	Alex Tecza	17 carries, 137 yards, 2 TD
Navy	Receiving	Brandon Chatman	1 reception, 38 yards

=== at Charlotte ===
Navy Midshipmen (2-3) vs. Charlotte 49ers (1-4) – Game summary

Quarter	1	2	3	4	Total
Midshipmen	0	0	7	7	14
49ers	0	0	0	0	0

at Jerry Richardson Stadium • Charlotte, North Carolina

- Date: October 14th
- Game time: 2 p.m. EST
- Game weather: Temperature: 70 °F (21 °C) • Wind: at 0 miles per hour (0 km/h) • Weather: Cloudy
- Game attendance: 15,659
- Referee: Steven Anderson
- TV announcers (ESPN+): Richard Cross (play-by-play), Taylor McHargue (analyst), Morgan Ube (sideline reporter)

Game information

First quarter

- No scoring summary this quarter

Second quarter

- No scoring summary this quarter

Third quarter

- (12:30) NAVY – Eli Heidenreich 69-yard pass from Braxton Woodson, Nathan Kirkwood kick (Drive: 5 plays, 75 yards, 2:30; Navy 7-0)

Fourth quarter

- (11:02) NAVY – Alex Tecza 62-yard run, Nathan Kirkwood kick (Drive: 1 play, 57 yards, 0:09; Navy 14-0)

Statistics	Navy	Charlotte
First downs	10	14
Plays–yards	55–265	68–265
Rushes–yards	40–173	40–123
Passing yards	92	142
Passing: comp–att–int	6–15–0	11–28–2
Time of possession	29:08	30:52

Team	Category	Player	Statistics
Navy	Passing	Braxton Woodson	5–14, 85 yards, TD
Navy	Rushing	Alex Tecza	6 carries, 75 yards, TD
Navy	Receiving	Eli Heidenreich	1 reception, 69 yards, TD
Charlotte	Passing	Trexler Ivey	11–27, 142 yards, 2 INT
Charlotte	Rushing	Shadrick Byrd	20 carries, 92 yards
Charlotte	Receiving	Duane Thomas Jr.	3 receptions, 54 yards

=== vs No. 22 Air Force (Commander-in-Chief's Trophy) ===
No. 22 Air Force Falcons (6-0) vs. Navy Midshipmen (3-3) – Game summary

Quarter	1	2	3	4	Total
No. 22 Falcons	0	7	3	7	17
Midshipmen	0	0	0	6	6

at Navy-Marine Corps Memorial Stadium • Annapolis, Maryland

- Date: October 21st
- Game time: 12:00 p.m. EST
- Game weather: Temperature: 61 °F (16 °C) • Wind: NW at 14 miles per hour (23 km/h) • Weather: Sunny
- Game attendance: 38,803
- Referee: Jonathan Noli
- TV announcers (CBS): Rich Waltz (play-by-play), Aaron Taylor (analyst), and Amanda Guerra (sideline reporter)

Game information

First quarter

- No scoring plays this quarter

Second quarter

- (14:48) AFA – Dane Kinamon 94-yard pass from Zac Larrier, Matthew Dapore kick (Drive: 2 plays, 94 yards, 0:29; Air Force 7–0)

Third quarter

- (5:55) AFA – Matthew Depore 40-yard field goal (Drive: 9 plays, 35 yards, 4:27; Air Force 10–0)

Fourth quarter

- (3:51) AFA – Alec Mock 18-yard interception, Matthew Depore kick (Drive: 3 plays, 0 yards, 0:17; Air Force 17–0)
- (0:50) NAVY – Eli Heidenreich 10-yard pass from Tai Lavatai, 2-point pass conversion failed (Drive: 15 plays, 78 yards, 3:01; Air Force 17–6)

Statistics	Air Force	Navy
First downs	8	10
Plays–yards	53–288	64–124
Rushes–yards	48–137	35–22
Passing yards	151	102
Passing: comp–att–int	15–29–2	4–5–0
Time of possession	31:44	28:16

Team	Category	Player	Statistics
Air Force	Passing	Zac Larrier	4–5, 151 yards, TD
Air Force	Rushing	Michel Emmanuel	22 carries, 69 yards
Air Force	Receiving	Dane Kinamon	1 reception, 94 yards, TD
Navy	Passing	Tai Lavatai	13–23, 96 yards, 2 INT, TD
Navy	Rushing	Alex Tecza	12 carries, 24 yards
Navy	Receiving	Alex Tecza	4 receptions, 27 yards

During halftime, the Navy honored Hall of Fame NFL quarterback and Midshipmen alum Roger Staubach surrounded by his teammates from the 1963 season who made it to the Cotton Bowl in 1964. The Naval academy painted his retired number 12 at the twelve yard line at both ends on the field, joining Navy halfback Joe Bellino's number 27.

=== at Temple ===
Navy Midshipmen (3-4) vs Temple Owls (2-6) – Game summary

Quarter	1	2	3	4	Total
Midshipmen	0	0	8	10	18
Owls	10	7	0	15	32

at Lincoln Financial Field • Philadelphia, Pennsylvania

- Date: November 4th
- Game time: 2:00 p.m. EST
- Game weather: Temperature: 56 °F (13 °C) • Wind: SW at 3 miles per hour (4.8 km/h) • Weather: Cloudy
- Game attendance: 13,049
- Referee: Darryl DeBerry
- TV announcers (ESPN+): Noah Reed (play-by-play) and Barrett Brooks (analyst)

Game information

First quarter

- (11:23) TEM – Jordan Smith 22-yard pass from E.J. Warner, Camden Price kick (Drive: 8 plays, 75 yards, 3:37; Temple 7-0)
- (3:18) TEM – Camden Price 42-yard field goal (Drive: 8 plays, 45 yards, 3:55; Temple 10-0)

Second quarter

- (14:46) TEM – David Martin-Robinson 24-yard pass from E.J. Warner, Camden Price kick (Drive: 3 plays, 46 yards, 1:22; Temple 17-0)

Third quarter

- (6:13) NAVY – Eli Heidenreich 24-yard pass from Xavier Arline, two-point conversion, Xavier Arline pass to Jayden Umbarger (Drive: 9 plays, 44 yards, 4:48; Temple 17-8)

Fourth quarter

- (14:56) NAVY – Xavier Arline 2-yard run, Nathan Kirkwood kick (Drive: 9 plays, 44 yards, 4:51; Temple 17-15)
- (9:09) TEM – Jordan Smith 13-yard pass from E.J. Warner, Camden Price kick (Drive: 12 plays, 81 yards, 5:42; Temple 24-15)
- (5:46) NAVY – Nathan Kirkwood 45-yard field goal (Drive: 7 plays, 45 yards, 3:17; Temple 24-18)
- (3:29) TEM – Dante Wright 16-yard pass from E.J. Warner, Camden Price kick (Drive: 5 plays, 75 yards, 2:17; Temple 32-18)

Statistics	Navy	Temple
First downs	13	23
Plays–yards	62–268	60–448
Rushes–yards	48–144	27–46
Passing yards	124	402
Passing: comp–att–int	6–14–0	27–33–2
Time of possession	32:58	27:02

Team	Category	Player	Statistics
Navy	Passing	Xavier Arline	6/14, 124 yards, TD
Navy	Rushing	Xavier Arline	30 carries, 97 yards, TD
Navy	Receiving	Eli Heidenreich	2 receptions, 63 yards, TD
Temple	Passing	E.J. Warner	27/33, 402 yards, 4 TD, 2 INT
Temple	Rushing	Edward Saydee	8 carries, 38 yards
Temple	Receiving	Zae Baines	7 receptions, 132 yards

=== vs UAB ===
UAB Blazers (3-6) vs Navy Midshipmen (3-5) – Game summary

Quarter	1	2	3	4	Total
Blazers	3	3	0	0	6
Midshipmen	7	0	3	21	31

at Navy-Marine Corps Memorial Stadium • Annapolis, Maryland

- Date: November 11th
- Game time: 3:30 p.m. EST
- Game weather: Temperature: 54 °F (12 °C) • Wind: SW at 5 miles per hour (8.0 km/h) • Weather: Clear
- Game attendance: 29,078
- Referee: Kevin Randell
- TV announcers (CBSSN): John Sadack (play-by-play), Randy Cross (analyst) & Sheehan Stanwick Burch (sideline reporter)

Game information

First quarter

- (2:49) NAVY – Regis Velez 45-yard pass from Xavier Arline, Nathan Kirkwood kick (Drive: 5 plays, 70 yards, 2:34; Navy 7-0)
- (0:30) UAB – Matt Quinn 37-yard field goal (Drive: 6 plays, 51 yards, 2:19; Navy 7-3)

Second quarter

- (6:22) UAB – Matt Quinn 29-yard field goal (Drive: 11 plays, 59 yards, 6:25; Navy 7-6)

Third quarter

- (9:13) NAVY – Nathan Kirkwood 31-yard field goal (Drive: 5 plays, 17 yards, 2:46; Navy 10-6)

Fourth quarter

- (10:08) NAVY – Daba Fofana 2-yard run, Nathan Kirkwood kick (Drive: 20 plays, 80 yards, 12:44; Navy 17-6)
- (4:12) NAVY – Xavier Arline 50-yard run, Nathan Kirkwood kick (Drive: 5 plays, 86 yards, 2:34; Navy 24-6)
- (2:03) NAVY – Rayuan Lane 97-yard interception, Nathan Kirkwood kick (Drive: 8 plays, 63 yards, 2:09; Navy 31-6)

Statistics	UAB	Navy
First downs	19	16
Plays–yards	66–321	57–363
Rushes–yards	30–115	47–269
Passing yards	206	94
Passing: comp–att–int	25–36–2	7–10–1
Time of possession	26:45	33:15

Team	Category	Player	Statistics
UAB	Passing	Jacob Zeno	25/36, 206 yards, 2 INT
UAB	Rushing	Jermaine Brown, Jr.	15 carries, 55 yards
UAB	Receiving	Bryce Damous	1 reception, 42 yards
Navy	Passing	Xavier Arline	7/10, 94 yards, TD, INT
Navy	Rushing	Xavier Arline	19 carries, 109 yards, TD
Navy	Receiving	Regis Velez	1 reception, 45 yards, TD

=== vs. East Carolina ===
East Carolina Pirates (1-9) vs Navy Midshipmen (4-5) – Game summary

Quarter	1	2	3	4	Total
Pirates	0	0	0	0	0
Midshipmen	7	0	0	3	10

at Navu-Marine Corps Memorial Stadium • Annapolis, Maryland

- Date: November 18th
- Game time: 12:00 p.m. EST
- Game weather: Temperature: 55 °F (13 °C) • Wind: NW at 18 miles per hour (29 km/h) • Weather: Sunny
- Game attendance: 28,708
- Referee: Steven Anderson
- TV announcers (ESPNews): Mike Corey (play-by-play) and Dustin Fox (analyst)

Game information

First quarter

- (2:47) NAVY – Alex Tecza 19-yard run, Nathan Kirkwood kick (Drive: 2 plays, 53 yards, 0:51; Navy 7-0)

Second quarter

- No scoring plays this quarter.

Third quarter

- No scoring plays this quarter.

Fourth quarter

- (8:49) NAVY – Nathan Kirkwood 27-yard field goal (Drive: 4 plays, 8 yards, 1:50; Navy 10-0)

Statistics	East Carolina	Navy
First downs	9	13
Plays–yards	60–189	61–276
Rushes–yards	22–34	50–174
Passing yards	155	102
Passing: comp–att–int	24–38–2	10–11–0
Time of possession	25:56	34:04

Team	Category	Player	Statistics
East Carolina	Passing	Alex Flinn	24/38, 155 yards, 2 INT
East Carolina	Rushing	Alex Flinn	12 carries, 31 yards
East Carolina	Receiving	Chase Sowell	6 receptions, 62 yards
Navy	Passing	Xavier Arline	10/11, 102 yards
Navy	Rushing	Alex Tecza	24 carries, 94 yards, TD
Navy	Receiving	Eli Heidenreich	2 receptions, 53 yards

With this victory, the Navy Midshipmen became the first FBS team to record three shutouts this season. Also, quarterback Xavier Arline set a Naval Academy record for completion percentage in a game. He completed 10 of 11 passes for 102 yards (90.9 percent). The previous record was 88.2 percent (15-17) by Marco Pagnanelli against the Duke Blue Devils on October 2, 1982.

=== at SMU (rivalry) ===
Navy Midshipmen (5-5) vs SMU Mustangs (9-2) – Game summary

Quarter	1	2	3	4	Total
Midshipmen	7	7	0	0	14
Mustangs	28	24	7	0	59

at Gerald J. Ford Stadium • Dallas, Texas

- Date: November 25th
- Game time: 12:00 p.m. EST
- Game weather: Temperature: 55 °F (13 °C) • Wind: E at 4 miles per hour (6.4 km/h) • Weather: Sunny
- Game attendance: 21,490
- Referee: Tim Rich
- TV announcers (ESPN2): Roy Philpott (play-by-play), Roddy Jones (analyst) and Taylor McGregor

Game information

First quarter

- (13:09) SMU – Tyler Lavine 1-yard run, Collin Rogers kick (Drive: 5 plays, 66 yards, 1:45; SMU 7-0)
- (8:57) SMU – Kelvontay Dixon 15-yard pass from Preston Stone, Collin Rogers kick (Drive: 5 plays, 80 yards, 1:59; SMU 14-0)
- (5:26) SMU – Jordan Hudson 27-yard pass from Preston Stone, Collin Rogers kick (Drive: 7 plays, 78 yards, 2:08; SMU 21-0)
- (1:57) SMU – Kelvontay Dixon 26-yard pass from Preston Stone, Collin Rogers kick (Drive: 4 plays, 67 yards, 1:51; SMU 28-0)
- (0:56) NAVY – Daba Fofana 1-yard run, Nathan Kirkwood kick (Drive: 1 play, 1 yard, 0:04; SMU 28-7)

Second quarter

- (14:12) SMU – Will Benton 0-yard fumble return, Collin Rogers kick (Drive: 3 plays, 8 yards, 1:37; SMU 35-7)
- (9:32) SMU – Tyler Lavine 8-yard run, Collin Rogers kick (Drive: 7 plays, 57 yards, 2:41; SMU 42-7)
- (4:59) SMU – Tyler Lavine 19-yard run, Collin Rogers kick (Drive: 7 plays, 55 yards, 2:53; SMU 49-7)
- (4:10) NAVY – Braxton Woodson 69-yard run, Nathan Kirkwood kick (Drive: 2 plays, 75 yards, 0:49; Navy 49-14)
- (0:41) SMU – Collin Rogers 30-yard field goal (Drive: 10 plays, 61 yards, 3:29; SMU 52-14)

Third quarter

- (9:31) SMU – Isaiah Nwokoboia 74-yard interception, Collin Rogers kick (Drive: 14 plays, 55 yards, 5:25; SMU 59-14)

Fourth quarter

- No scoring summary this quarter.

Statistics	Navy	SMU
First downs	14	21
Plays–yards	70–253	63–487
Rushes–yards	45–182	34–118
Passing yards	71	369
Passing: comp–att–int	9–25–1	18–29–0
Time of possession	32:04	27:56

Team	Category	Player	Statistics
Navy	Passing	Braxton Woodson	9/18, 71 yards, INT
Navy	Rushing	Braxton Woodson	18 carries, 104 yards, TD
Navy	Receiving	Alex Tecza	3 receptions, 34 yards,
SMU	Passing	Preston Stone	14/19, 322 yards, 3 TD
SMU	Rushing	Tyler Lavine	7 carries, 49 yards, 3 TD
SMU	Receiving	Kelvontay Dixon	4 receptions, 125 yards, 2 TD

=== vs Army (124th Army–Navy Game), (Commander-in-Chief's Trophy) ===
Army Black Knights (5-6) vs Navy Midshipmen (5-6) – (124th Army-Navy Game)

Quarter	1	2	3	4	Total
Black Kights	0	10	0	7	17
Midshipmen	0	0	0	11	11

at Gillette Stadium • Foxborough, Massachusetts

- Date: December 9th
- Game time: 3:00 p.m. EST/12:00 p.m. PST
- Game weather: Temperature: • Wind: NW at 6 MPH at 51 miles per hour (82 km/h) • Weather: Cloudy
- Game attendance: 65,878
- Referee: Edwin Lee
- TV announcers (CBS): Brad Nessler (play-by-play), Gary Danielson (analyst) & Jenny Dell (sideline)

Game information

First quarter

- No scoring plays this quarter

Second quarter

- (14:19) ARMY – Tyson Riley 4-yard pass from Bryson Daily, Quinn Maretzki kick (Drive: 12 plays, 65 yards, 7:13; Army 7–0)
- (0:00) ARMY – Quinn Maretzki 47-yard field goal (Drive: 7 plays, 34 yards, 1:05; Army 10–0)

Third quarter

- No scoring plays this quarter

Fourth quarter

- (12:45) NAVY – Nathan Kirkwood 37-yard field goal (Drive: 12 plays, 70 yards, 5:08; Army 10–3)
- (4:49) ARMY – Kalib Fortner 44-yard fumble recovery, Quinn Maretzki kick (Drive: 6 plays, 14 yards, 2:20; Army 17–3)
- (2:47) NAVY – Jaden Umbarger 14-yard pass from Tai Lavatai, two-point conversion failed (Drive: 7 plays, 59 yards, 2:02; Army 17–9)
- (0:00) NAVY – Luke Pirris 0-yard safety (Drive: 1 plays, -1 yard, 0:03; Army 17-11)

Statistics	Army	Navy
First downs	15	17
Plays–yards	61–259	64–309
Rushes–yards	47–205	35–130
Passing yards	54	179
Passing: comp–att–int	7–14–0	16–29–1
Time of possession	33:31	26:29

Team	Category	Player	Statistics
Army	Passing	Bryson Daily	7/14, 54 yards, TD
Army	Rushing	Kanye Udoh	13 carries, 88 yards
Army	Receiving	Casey Reynolds	3 receptions, 32 yards
Navy	Passing	Tai Lavatai	16/26, 179 yards, TD
Navy	Rushing	Tai Lavatai	19 carries, 74 yards
Navy	Receiving	Jayden Umbarger	6 receptions, 75 yards, TD

For this year's clash, Navy represented the crewmembers of Submarine warfare. Nicknamed the "Silent Service", the uniform pays tribute to the U.S. Submarine Force. The color rush uniform is covered in 'Eclipse Navy', Under Armour's darkest shade of navy blue, to mimic the covert design of a submarine hull. According to the Naval Academy website, "The overall design was intended to be simple and utilitarian to convey the stealth purposes of a submarine's design." The helmet bears an airbrushed Virginia-Class submarine on the right side and a Navy's anchor logo hand-painted with color-changing pragmatic paint on the left side.
