= Liberty Bowl =

Annual American college football game

- AutoZone Liberty Bowl
- Stadium: Simmons Bank Liberty Stadium
- Location: Memphis, Tennessee
- Previous stadiums: Philadelphia Municipal Stadium (1959–1963); Convention Hall (1964)
- Previous locations: Philadelphia (1959–1963); Atlantic City, New Jersey (1964)
- Operated: 1959–present
- Conference tie-ins: Big 12 (4th pick) vs SEC pool pick; American (alternate)
- Previous conference tie-ins: C-USA (1996–2013); MWC (1998–2005) winner of the Commander in Chief's Trophy (1989–1992)
- Payout: US$6 million (2022)
- Website: libertybowl.org

Sponsors
- St. Jude (1993–1996); AXA Financial (1997–2003); AutoZone (2004–present)

Former names
- Liberty Bowl (1959–1992); St. Jude Liberty Bowl (1993–1996); AXA Liberty Bowl (1997–2003)

2026 matchup
- Navy vs. Cincinnati (Navy 35–13)

The Liberty Bowl is an annual American college football bowl game played in late December or early January since 1959. For its first five years, it was played at Philadelphia Municipal Stadium in Philadelphia before being held at Atlantic City Convention Hall in 1964. Since 1965, the game has been held at Simmons Bank Liberty Stadium in Memphis, Tennessee. Because of the scheduling of the bowl game near the end of the calendar year, no game was played during calendar years 2008 or 2015, while two games were played in calendar years 2010 and 2016.

Since 2004, the game has been sponsored by Memphis-based auto parts retailer AutoZone and officially known as the AutoZone Liberty Bowl. Previous sponsors include St. Jude Children's Research Hospital (1993–1996) and AXA Financial (1997–2003).

== History ==
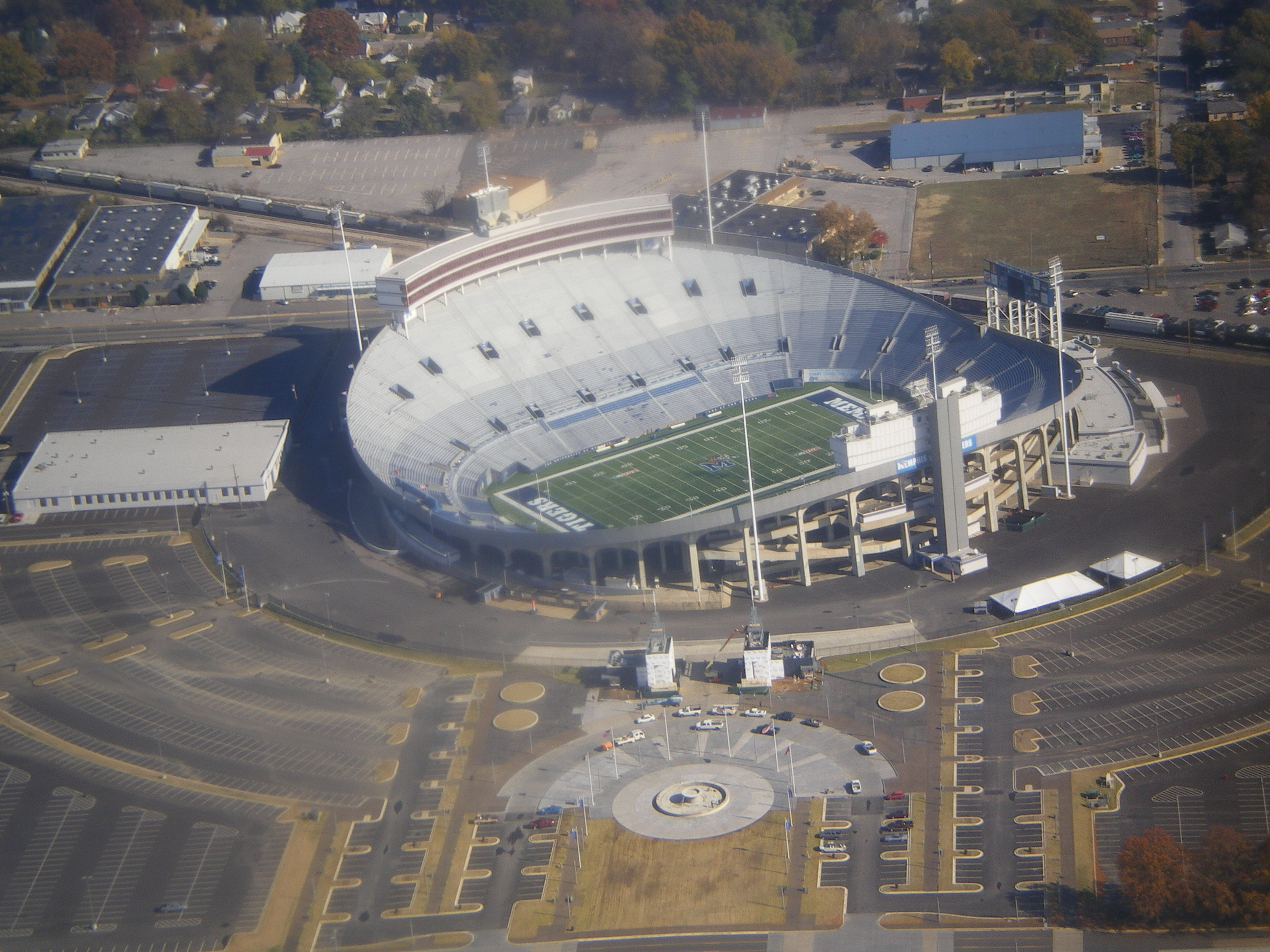
Simmons Bank Liberty Stadium, home of the Liberty Bowl since the 1965 edition

A. F. "Bud" Dudley, a former Villanova athletic director, created the Liberty Bowl in Philadelphia in 1959. The game was played at Philadelphia's Municipal Stadium. It was the only cold-weather bowl game of its time, and was plagued by poor attendance. The first game was the most successful of the five held in Philadelphia, as 38,000 fans watched Penn State beat Alabama, 7–0, in the bowl's inaugural edition.

A group of Atlantic City businessmen convinced Dudley to move his game from Philadelphia to Atlantic City's Convention Hall for 1964 and guaranteed Dudley $25,000. It would be the first major (University Division, now Division I) bowl game played indoors. AstroTurf was still in its developmental stages and was unavailable for the game. Convention Hall was equipped with a 4-inch-thick (100 mm) grass surface with 2 inches (51 mm) of burlap underneath it (as padding) on top of concrete. To keep the grass growing, artificial lighting was installed and kept on 24 hours a day. The entire process cost about $16,000. End zones were only 8 yards long, rather than the regulation 10 yards. 6,059 fans saw Utah rout West Virginia, 32–6. Dudley was paid $25,000 from Atlantic City businessmen, $60,000 from the gate, and $95,000 from television revenues, and cleared $10,000 net profit.

In 1965, Dudley moved the game to Memphis, Tennessee, where it made its home at Memphis Memorial Stadium to much larger crowds; the venue was renamed as Liberty Bowl Memorial Stadium in December 1975. Having been played every college football season since 1959, the game has established itself as one of the oldest non-New Year's Six bowls.

== Matchup ==
During the late 1980s and early 1990s, the Liberty Bowl offered an automatic invitation to the winner of the Commander-in-Chief's Trophy, if that team was bowl eligible. Due to the limited success of service academy football during this era, the only academy to appear in the Liberty Bowl as a result of this arrangement was Air Force, which appeared in four consecutive games, 1989–1992.

Beginning in 1996, the Liberty Bowl began an affiliation with the newly launched Conference USA (C-USA), offering its champion an automatic bid. Beginning in 2005, the winner of C-USA was determined by the newly created C-USA championship game. The winner of that game was customarily offered the bowl berth from 2005 to 2013.

In 1996 and 1997, the opponent for the C-USA champion was a team from the Big East. In 1998, the Liberty Bowl replaced the Holiday Bowl in a shared contract with the Cotton Bowl and had second choice between the WAC champion and a team from the SEC. From 1999 to 2005, the opponent for the C-USA champion was the Mountain West champion. There were two exceptions:

- 2004: Mountain West champion Utah qualified for the BCS. In their place, the Liberty Bowl chose WAC champion Boise State.
- 2005: Mountain West champion TCU chose to play in the 2005 Houston Bowl. At-large WAC team Fresno State took their place.

In 1999, the Mountain West Conference did not have an outright champion, as three teams tied for the conference lead. The conference's bid for the game was given to Colorado State.

The bowl's contract from 2006 until 2013 pitted the winner of the C-USA championship game against the eighth pick from the SEC. The American was to provide its fifth-place team as an alternate if the SEC could not provide a team. The SEC was also given veto power for the bowl, and elected to use it in 2011 to block C-USA champion Southern Miss from playing Vanderbilt; instead, Cincinnati got the spot and Southern Miss accepted an invitation to the 2011 Hawaii Bowl instead.

Since 2014, the matchup features a team from the SEC against the fourth pick from the Big 12 Conference. The Liberty Bowl is part of a six-bowl SEC pool arrangement that also involves the Duke's Mayo (formerly Belk) in odd-numbered years or the Las Vegas in even-numbered years, Music City, ReliaQuest, Gator, and Texas bowls; these bowls will choose one representative from the conference each, while the College Football Playoff receiving first choice (usually the Sugar Bowl in years it does not serve as a national semifinal) and the Citrus Bowl second choice.

The game is televised nationally on ESPN, and is carried nationwide by ESPN Radio, and internationally by ESPN International.

=== Recent matchups of note ===
The 2010 win by UCF was the program's first-ever bowl victory.

The 2011 game matched Coaches' Poll 24th-ranked Cincinnati against upstart Vanderbilt, and unlike most lower tier bowls, it aired on the broadcast network ABC rather than its cable brother network ESPN. Cincinnati defeated Vanderbilt in a second-half comeback.

The 2012 Liberty Bowl featured an unusual rematch of a regular season game between the Iowa State Cyclones (9th place in the Big 12) and the Tulsa Golden Hurricane (C-USA champions). Iowa State had defeated Tulsa, 38–23, in the season's first weekend, however Tulsa defeated Iowa State, 31–17, in the Liberty Bowl. Though the bowl normally selects a team from the SEC, it invited Iowa State because the SEC did not have enough bowl-eligible teams to fill all of its contracted bowl games.

In 2020, after a matchup of West Virginia and Tennessee was announced on December 20, the Tennessee program had to withdraw on December 21 due to positive COVID-19 testing. Army, who had accepted an invitation to the Independence Bowl before it was cancelled due to a lack of available teams, was named as their replacement.

In the 2022 matchup, Kansas made their first bowl game appearance in 14 years, against Arkansas. The Razorbacks took an early 38–13 lead in the game. The Jayhawks then scored 25 unanswered points to send the game into overtime. The teams traded touchdowns in the first and second overtime. In the third overtime, with teams alternating two-point conversion attempts per NCAA overtime rules, the Razorbacks scored on their attempt and stopped the Jayhawks' attempt, resulting in a 55–53 Arkansas win. Kansas quarterback Jalon Daniels set a Kansas single-game record and a Liberty Bowl record for passing yards, with 544.

== Game results ==
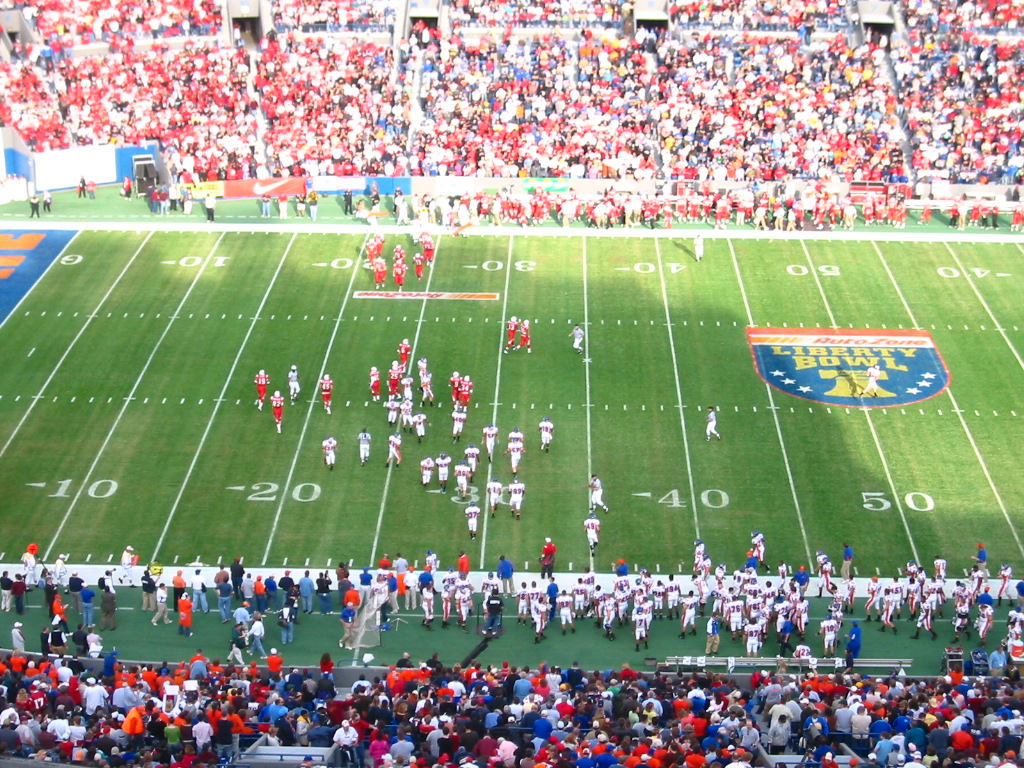
Boise State and Louisville square off in the 2004 Liberty Bowl in Memphis, Tennessee.

The first five editions (1959–1963) were played in Philadelphia, Pennsylvania. The 1964 game was played in Atlantic City, New Jersey. All subsequent editions have been played in Memphis, Tennessee.

Rankings are based on the AP poll prior to the game being played.

Date	Winning Team		Losing Team		Attnd.	Notes
December 19, 1959	12 Penn State	7	10 Alabama	0	36,211	notes
December 20, 1960	16 Penn State	41	Oregon	12	16,624	notes
December 16, 1961	14 Syracuse	15	Miami (FL)	14	15,712	notes
December 15, 1962	Oregon State	6	Villanova	0	17,048	notes
December 21, 1963	Mississippi State	16	NC State	12	8,309	notes
December 19, 1964	Utah	32	West Virginia	6	6,059	notes
December 18, 1965	Ole Miss	13	Auburn	7	38,607	notes
December 10, 1966	9 Miami (FL)	14	Virginia Tech	7	39,101	notes
December 16, 1967	NC State	14	Georgia	7	35,045	notes
December 14, 1968	Ole Miss	34	Virginia Tech	17	46,206	notes
December 13, 1969	Colorado	47	Alabama	33	50,042	notes
December 12, 1970	Tulane	17	Colorado	3	44,640	notes
December 20, 1971	9 Tennessee	14	18 Arkansas	13	51,410	notes
December 18, 1972	Georgia Tech	31	Iowa State	30	50,021	notes
December 17, 1973	16 NC State	31	19 Kansas	18	50,011	notes
December 16, 1974	Tennessee	7	10 Maryland	3	51,284	notes
December 22, 1975	USC	20	2 Texas A&M	0	52,129	notes
December 20, 1976	16 Alabama	36	7 UCLA	6	52,736	notes
December 19, 1977	12 Nebraska	21	14 North Carolina	17	49,456	notes
December 23, 1978	18 Missouri	20	LSU	15	53,064	notes
December 22, 1979	Penn State	9	15 Tulane	6	50,021	notes
December 27, 1980	16 Purdue	28	Missouri	25	35,667	notes
December 30, 1981	15 Ohio State	31	Navy	28	43,216	notes
December 29, 1982	Alabama	21	Illinois	15	54,123	notes
December 29, 1983	Notre Dame	19	13 Boston College	18	47,071	notes
December 27, 1984	16 Auburn	21	Arkansas	15	50,180	notes
December 27, 1985	Baylor	21	12 LSU	7	40,186	notes
December 29, 1986	Tennessee	21	Minnesota	14	51,327	notes
December 29, 1987	15 Georgia	20	Arkansas	17	53,249	notes
December 28, 1988	Indiana	34	South Carolina	10	39,210	notes
December 29, 1989	Ole Miss	42	Air Force	29	60,128	notes
December 27, 1990	Air Force	23	24 Ohio State	11	39,262	notes
December 29, 1991	Air Force	38	Mississippi State	15	61,497	notes
December 31, 1992	20 Ole Miss	13	Air Force	0	32,107	notes
December 28, 1993	25 Louisville	18	Michigan State	7	34,216	notes
December 31, 1994	Illinois	30	East Carolina	0	33,280	notes
December 30, 1995	East Carolina	19	Stanford	13	47,398	notes
December 27, 1996	23 Syracuse	30	Houston	17	49,163	notes
December 31, 1997	Southern Miss	41	Pittsburgh	7	50,209	notes
December 31, 1998	10 Tulane	41	BYU	27	52,192	notes
December 31, 1999	16 Southern Miss	23	Colorado State	17	54,866	notes
December 29, 2000	23 Colorado State	22	22 Louisville	17	58,302	notes
December 31, 2001	23 Louisville	28	19 BYU	10	58,968	notes
December 31, 2002	TCU	17	23 Colorado State	3	55,207	notes
December 31, 2003	25 Utah	17	Southern Miss	0	55,989	notes
December 31, 2004	7 Louisville	44	10 Boise State	40	58,355	notes
December 31, 2005	Tulsa	31	Fresno State	24	54,894	notes
December 29, 2006	South Carolina	44	Houston	36	56,103	notes
December 29, 2007	Mississippi State	10	UCF	3	63,816	notes
January 2, 2009	Kentucky	25	East Carolina	19	56,125	notes
January 2, 2010	Arkansas	20	East Carolina	17 (OT)	62,742	notes
December 31, 2010	UCF	10	Georgia	6	51,231	notes
December 31, 2011	Cincinnati	31	Vanderbilt	24	57,103	notes
December 31, 2012	Tulsa	31	Iowa State	17	53,687	notes
December 31, 2013	Mississippi State	44	Rice	7	57,846	notes
December 29, 2014	Texas A&M	45	West Virginia	37	51,282	notes
January 2, 2016	Arkansas	45	Kansas State	23	61,136	notes
December 30, 2016	Georgia	31	TCU	23	51,087	notes
December 30, 2017	Iowa State	21	18 Memphis	20	57,266	notes
December 31, 2018	Oklahoma State	38	24 Missouri	33	51,587	notes
December 31, 2019	21 Navy	20	Kansas State	17	50,515	notes
December 31, 2020	West Virginia	24	Army	21	8,187	notes
December 28, 2021	Texas Tech	34	Mississippi State	7	48,615	notes
December 28, 2022	Arkansas	55	Kansas	53 (3OT)	52,847	notes
December 29, 2023	Memphis	36	Iowa State	26	48,789	notes
December 27, 2024	Arkansas	39	Texas Tech	26	37,764	notes
January 2, 2026	22 Navy	35	Cincinnati	13	21,908	notes

== MVPs ==
The bowl has named a single MVP for each game, since inception. In nine instances, the MVP has played on the losing team, including four instances in a seven-game span during 1977–1983. The most recent MVP to play on the losing team was Kwame Ellis of Stanford in 1995. Quarterback Rob Perez of Air Force was named MVP twice, in 1990 and 1991.

Game	MVP	Team	Position
1959	Jay Huffman	Penn State	C
1960	Dick Hoak	Penn State	RB
1961	Dick Easterly	Syracuse	RB
1962	Terry Baker	Oregon State	QB
1963	Ode Burrell	Mississippi State	HB
1964	Ernest Allen	Utah	QB
1965	Tom Bryan	Auburn†	FB
1966	Jimmy Cox	Miami (Florida)	SE
1967	Jim Donnan	NC State	QB
1968	Steve Hindman	Ole Miss	TB
1969	Bobby Anderson	Colorado	TB
1970	Dave Abercrombie	Tulane	TB
1971	Joe Ferguson	Arkansas†	QB
1972	Jim Stevens	Georgia Tech	QB
1973	Stan Fritts	NC State	FB
1974	Randy White	Maryland†	DT
1975	Ricky Bell	USC	RB
1976	Barry Krauss	Alabama	LB
1977	Matt Kupec	North Carolina†	QB
1978	James Wilder Sr.	Missouri	RB
1979	Roch Hontas	Tulane†	QB
1980	Mark Herrmann	Purdue	QB
1981	Eddie Myers	Navy†	TB
1982	Jeremiah Castille	Alabama	DB
1983	Doug Flutie	Boston College†	QB
1984	Bo Jackson	Auburn	RB
1985	Cody Carlson	Baylor	QB
1986	Jeff Francis	Tennessee	QB
1987	Greg Thomas	Arkansas†	QB
1988	Dave Schnell	Indiana	QB
1989	Randy Baldwin	Ole Miss	RB
1990	Rob Perez	Air Force	QB
1991	Rob Perez	Air Force	QB

Game	MVP	Team	Position
1992	Cassius Ware	Ole Miss	LB
1993	Jeff Brohm	Louisville	QB
1994	Johnny Johnson	Illinois	QB
1995	Kwame Ellis	Stanford†	CB
1996	Malcolm Thomas	Syracuse	RB
1997	Sherrod Gideon	Southern Miss.	WR
1998	Shaun King	Tulane	QB
1999	Adalius Thomas	Southern Miss.	DE
2000	Cecil Sapp	Colorado State	RB
2001	Dave Ragone	Louisville	QB
2002	LaTarence Dunbar	TCU	WR
2003	Morgan Scalley	Utah	DB
2004	Stefan LeFors	Louisville	QB
2005	Paul Smith	Tulsa	QB
2006	Blake Mitchell	South Carolina	QB
2007	Derek Pegues	Mississippi State	FS
2009	Ventrell Jenkins	Kentucky	DT
2010 (Jan)	Ryan Mallett	Arkansas	QB
2010 (Dec)	Latavius Murray	UCF	RB
2011	Isaiah Pead	Cincinnati	RB
2012	Trey Watts	Tulsa	RB
2013	Dak Prescott	Mississippi State	QB
2014	Kyle Allen	Texas A&M	QB
2016 (Jan)	Alex Collins	Arkansas	RB
2016 (Dec)	Trenton Thompson	Georgia	DT
2017	Allen Lazard	Iowa State	WR
2018	Taylor Cornelius	Oklahoma State	QB
2019	Malcolm Perry	Navy	QB
2020	T. J. Simmons	West Virginia	WR
2021	Donovan Smith	Texas Tech	QB
2022	KJ Jefferson	Arkansas	QB
2023	Seth Henigan	Memphis	QB
2024	Taylen Green	Arkansas	QB
2026	Blake Horvath	Navy	QB

† indicates the MVP played on the losing team

== Most appearances ==
Updated through the January 2026 edition (67 games, 134 total appearances).

Teams with multiple appearances

Rank	Team	Games	W–L
1	Arkansas	7	4–3
2	Mississippi State	5	3–2
T3	Ole Miss	4	4–0
T3	Louisville	4	3–1
T3	Air Force	4	2–2
T3	Alabama	4	2–2
T3	Georgia	4	2–2
T3	Iowa State	4	1–3
T3	East Carolina	4	1–3
T10	Tennessee	3	3–0
T10	Penn State	3	3–0
T10	NC State	3	2–1
T10	Southern Miss	3	2–1
T10	Tulane	3	2–1
T10	Navy	3	2–1
T10	Colorado State	3	1–2
T10	Missouri	3	1–2
T10	West Virginia	3	1–2

Rank	Team	Games	W–L
T19	Syracuse	2	2–0
T19	Tulsa	2	2–0
T19	Utah	2	2–0
T19	Cincinnati	2	1–1
T19	Auburn	2	1–1
T19	Colorado	2	1–1
T19	Illinois	2	1–1
T19	Miami (Florida)	2	1–1
T19	Ohio State	2	1–1
T19	South Carolina	2	1–1
T19	TCU	2	1–1
T19	Texas A&M	2	1–1
T19	UCF	2	1–1
T19	Memphis	2	1–1
T19	Texas Tech	2	1–1
T19	BYU	2	0–2
T19	Houston	2	0–2
T19	Kansas	2	0–2
T19	Kansas State	2	0–2
T19	LSU	2	0–2
T19	Virginia Tech	2	0–2

Teams with a single appearance

Won (10): Baylor, Georgia Tech, Indiana, Kentucky, Nebraska, Notre Dame, Oklahoma State, Oregon State, Purdue, USC
Lost (15): Army, Boise State, Boston College, Fresno State, Maryland, Michigan State, Minnesota, North Carolina, Oregon, Pittsburgh, Rice, Stanford, UCLA, Vanderbilt, Villanova

== Appearances by conference ==
Updated through the January 2026 edition (67 games, 134 total appearances).

Conference	Record				Appearances by season	
Conference	Games	W	L	Win pct.	Won	Lost
SEC	33	22	11	.667	1963, 1965, 1968, 1971, 1974, 1976, 1982, 1984, 1986, 1987, 1989, 1992, 2006, 2007, 2008*, 2009*, 2013, 2014, 2015*, 2016, 2022, 2024	1959, 1965, 1967, 1969, 1978, 1985, 1991, 2010, 2011, 2018, 2021
Independents	22	11	11	.500	1959, 1960, 1961, 1962, 1966, 1970, 1972, 1979, 1983, 1993, 1995	1960, 1961, 1962, 1966, 1968, 1979, 1981, 1983, 1988, 1994, 2020
CUSA	17	9	8	.529	1997, 1998, 1999, 2001, 2002, 2004, 2005, 2010, 2012	1996, 2000, 2003, 2006, 2007, 2008*, 2009*, 2013
Big 12	13	4	9	.308	2017, 2018, 2020, 2021	2012, 2014, 2015*, 2016, 2019, 2022, 2023, 2024, 2025*
Big Ten	8	4	4	.500	1980, 1981, 1988, 1994	1982, 1986, 1990, 1993
WAC	8	3	5	.375	1964, 1990, 1991	1989, 1992, 1998, 2004, 2005
American	7	5	2	.714	1996, 2011, 2019, 2023, 2025*	1997, 2017
Big Eight	7	3	4	.429	1969, 1977, 1978	1970, 1972, 1973, 1980
ACC	5	2	3	.400	1967, 1973	1963, 1974, 1977
Mountain West	5	2	3	.400	2000, 2003	1999, 2001, 2002
SWC	5	1	4	.200	1985	1971, 1975, 1984, 1987
Pac-10	3	1	2	.333	1975	1976, 1995
SoCon	1	0	1	.000		1964

- Games marked with an asterisk (*) were played in January of the following calendar year.
- Records reflect conference membership at the time each game was played.
  - The 1965 game was contested between two SEC teams. Two independent teams have met multiple times.
- Conferences that are defunct or no longer active in FBS are marked in italics.
  - The Pac-12 Conference appeared in the bowl when the conference was known as the Pac-8 and Pac-10.
  - The record of the America Conference includes appearances of the Big East Conference, as the American retains the charter of the original Big East, following its 2013 realignment. Teams representing the Big East appeared in three games, compiling a 2–1 record.
- Independent appearances: Army (2020), Boston College (1983), East Carolina (1994, 1995), Georgia Tech (1972), Louisville (1993), Miami (FL) (1961, 1966), Navy (1981), Notre Dame (1983), Oregon (1960), Oregon State (1962), Penn State (1959, 1960, 1979), South Carolina (1988), Syracuse (1961), Tulane (1970, 1979), Villanova (1962), Virginia Tech (1966, 1968).

Every SEC member except Florida has played in the game. Every current of former Big 12 member except Oklahoma and Texas have played in the game. A majority of teams that are members of the power conferences have appeared in the game.

== Game records ==
Team	Record, Team vs. Opponent	Game
Most points scored (one team)	55, Arkansas vs. Kansas	2022
Most points scored (losing team)	53, Kansas vs. Arkansas	2022
Most points scored (both teams)	108, Arkansas vs. Kansas	2022
Fewest points allowed	0, most recent: Utah vs. Southern Miss	2003
Largest margin of victory	37, Mississippi State vs. Rice	2013
Total yards	681, Arkansas vs. Kansas	2022
Rushing yards	473, Colorado vs. Alabama	1969
Passing yards	544, Kansas vs. Arkansas	2022
First downs	30, shared by: Ole Miss vs. Air Force; Arkansas vs. Kansas State; Kansas vs. Arkansas	1989; 2015; 2022
Fewest yards allowed	131, Alabama vs. Penn State	1959
Fewest rushing yards allowed	–8, Penn State vs. Tulane	1979
Fewest passing yards allowed	2, Ole Miss vs. Virginia Tech	1968
Individual	Record, Player, Team	Game
All-purpose yards	279, Vincent Marshall (Houston)	2006
Touchdowns (all-purpose)	3, shared by: Bob Anderson (Colorado); Sherrod Gideon (Southern Miss); Alex Singleton (Tulsa); Alex Collins (Arkansas); Tyhier Tyler (Army)	1969; 1997; 2012; 2015; 2020
Rushing yards	254, Bob Anderson (Colorado)	1969
Rushing touchdowns	3, most recent: Tyhier Tyler, (Army)	2020
Passing yards	544, Jalon Daniels (Kansas)	2022
Passing touchdowns	5, Jalon Daniels (Kansas)	2022
Receptions	10, shared by: Bobby Joe Edmonds (Arkansas); Deon Branch (Louisville); Allen Lazard (Iowa State)); Luke Grimm (Kansas)	1984; 2000; 2017; 2022
Receiving yards	220, Jameon Lewis (Mississippi State)	2013
Receiving touchdowns	3, Sherrod Gideon (Southern Miss)	1997
Tackles, total	19, shared by: George Andrews (Nebraska); A. J. Klein (Iowa State)	1977; 2012
Tackles, solo	12, Randy White (Maryland)	1974
Sacks	3, Trenton Thompson (Georgia)	2016 (Dec)
Interceptions	3, shared by: Louis Campbell (Arkansas); Jeremiah Castille (Alabama)	1971; 1982
Long Plays	Record, Player, Team vs. Opponent	Game
Touchdown run	99 yds., Terry Baker (Oregon State)	1962
Touchdown pass	94 yds., Taylen Green to Dazmin James (Arkansas)	2024
Kickoff return	99 yds., David Jones (Kentucky)	2008
Punt return	79 yds., Norman Jefferson (LSU)	1985
Interception return	92 yds., Andy Avalos (Boise State)	2004
Fumble return	74 yds., Morgan Scalley (Utah)	2003
Punt	73 yds., Joey Huber (Colorado State)	2000
Field goal	49 yds., Tanner Gillis (Memphis)	2023

== Media coverage ==
The earliest editions of the bowl were broadcast by NBC (1959–1963) and ABC (1964–1980). Several different networks carried the 1981 through 1989 games, including USA Network, Katz Broadcasting, and Raycom. Since 1990, the game has been broadcast predominantly by ESPN, with some editions on ABC.
