= 2025 Navy Midshipmen football team =

American college football season

2025 Navy Midshipmen football

Lambert-Meadowlands Trophy Liberty Bowl champion

Liberty Bowl, W 35–13 vs. Cincinnati
- Conference: American Conference

Ranking
- Coaches: No. 23
- AP: No. 23
- Record: 11–2 (7–1 American)
- Head coach: Brian Newberry (3rd season)
- Offensive coordinator: Drew Cronic (2nd season)
- Offensive scheme: Wing-T
- Defensive coordinator: P. J. Volker (3rd season)
- Base defense: 4–2–5
- Home stadium: Navy–Marine Corps Memorial Stadium

2025 American Conference football standings
	Conf.			Overall
Team	W		L	W		L
No. 18 Tulane y$^	7	–	1	11	–	3
No. 24 North Texas y	7	–	1	12	–	2
No. 23 Navy	7	–	1	11	–	2
South Florida	6	–	2	9	–	4
East Carolina	6	–	2	9	–	4
Memphis	4	–	4	8	–	5
Army	4	–	4	7	–	6
UTSA	4	–	4	7	–	6
Temple	3	–	5	5	–	7
Florida Atlantic	3	–	5	4	–	8
Rice	2	–	6	5	–	8
UAB	2	–	6	4	–	8
Tulsa	1	–	7	4	–	8
Charlotte	0	–	8	1	–	11
Championship: Tulane 34, North Texas 21
^ – College Football Playoff participant; $ – Conference champion; y – Championship game participant; Rankings from AP Poll

The 2025 Navy Midshipmen football team represented the United States Naval Academy as member of the American Conference during the 2025 NCAA Division I FBS football season. Led by third-year head coach Brian Newberry, the Midshipmen played their home games at Navy–Marine Corps Memorial Stadium in Annapolis, Maryland.

== Schedule ==
Date	Time	Opponent	Site	TV	Result	Attendance
August 30	12:00 p.m.	VMI*	Navy–Marine Corps Memorial Stadium; Annapolis, MD	CBSSN	W 52–7	30,014
September 6	3:30 p.m.	UAB	Navy–Marine Corps Memorial Stadium; Annapolis, MD	CBSSN	W 38–24	28,325
September 13	8:00 p.m.	at Tulsa	Skelly Field at H. A. Chapman Stadium; Tulsa, OK	ESPN+	W 42–23	20,103
September 27	3:30 p.m.	Rice	Navy–Marine Corps Memorial Stadium; Annapolis, MD	CBSSN	W 21–13	28,873
October 4	12:00 p.m.	Air Force*	Navy–Marine Corps Memorial Stadium; Annapolis, MD (Commander-in-Chief's Trophy)	CBS	W 34–31	37,517
October 11	4:00 p.m.	at Temple	Lincoln Financial Field; Philadelphia, PA	ESPN2	W 32–31	26,149
October 25	3:30 p.m.	Florida Atlantic	Navy–Marine Corps Memorial Stadium; Annapolis, MD	CBSSN	W 42–32	32,175
November 1	12:00 p.m.	at North Texas	DATCU Stadium; Denton, TX	ESPN2	L 17–31	26,516
November 8	7:30 p.m.	at No. 10 Notre Dame*	Notre Dame Stadium; Notre Dame, IN (rivalry)	NBC	L 10–49	77,622
November 15	12:00 p.m.	No. 24 South Florida	Navy–Marine Corps Memorial Stadium; Annapolis, MD	ESPN2	W 41–38	34,856
November 27	7:30 p.m.	at Memphis	Simmons Bank Liberty Stadium; Memphis, TN	ESPN	W 28–17	27,082
December 13	3:00 p.m.	vs. Army*	M&T Bank Stadium; Baltimore, MD (Army–Navy Game, Commander-in-Chief's Trophy)	CBS	W 17–16	70,936
January 2, 2026	4:30 p.m.	vs. Cincinnati*	Simmons Bank Liberty Stadium; Memphis, TN (Liberty Bowl)	ESPN	W 35–13	21,908
*Non-conference game; Rankings from AP Poll (and CFP Rankings, after November 4) - Released prior to game; All times are in Eastern time

== Rankings ==
Ranking movements Legend: ██ Increase in ranking ██ Decrease in ranking — = Not ranked RV = Received votes
	Week																
Poll	Pre	1	2	3	4	5	6	7	8	9	10	11	12	13	14	15	Final
AP	RV	RV	RV	RV	—	—	RV	RV	RV	RV	—	—	RV	RV	23	22	23
Coaches	RV	RV	RV	RV	RV	RV	RV	RV	RV	23	RV	RV	RV	RV	25	25	23
CFP	Not released										—	—	—	—	—	—	Not released

== Roster ==
2025 Navy Midshipmen football team roster
Players
Coaches
Offense

Pos.	#	Name	Class
WR	0	Noah Ball	Jr
QB	1	Alex Erby	Fr
SB	1	Brandon George	Fr
SB	2	Jeremiah Chalmers	Fr
QB	2	Robert "Tre" Jones III	So
SB	3	Prosper Akanna	So
QB	5	Braxton Woodson	Jr
QB	6	J.P. Doyle	So
RB	6	Vic Listori	Jr
SB	7	Andre Gilber Jr.	So
QB	7	Landon Walker	Fr
QB	8	Jackson Gutierrez	So
QB	9	Mason Baker	Fr
WR	9	Eli Harris	Fr
QB	10	Ryan Brass	Fr
TE	10	Drew Hall	So
QB	11	Blake Horvath	Sr
WR	13	Landon Dolhancyk	Fr
SB	14	Maddax Fayard	Fr
SB	15	Paul Lewis	So
QB	15	Brady McDonough	Fr
QB	16	Michael Dove	Fr
SB	16	Alonzo Manning II	Fr
SB	18	Andersen Cardoza	So
SB	20	TK Hodges	Jr
SB	21	Santino Sanchez	Fr
SB	22	Eli Heidenreich	Sr
SB	23	Tyler Bradley	Jr
SB	23	Charles Robinson	So
SB	24	Brandon Chatman	Sr
SB	25	Isaiah Bryant	Jr
SB	26	Michael Barrow	So
SB	29	Gage Leonard	Jr
RB	31	Jai Hundley	So
RB	32	Christian Cromer	Fr
RB	33	Mikey Pearson III	So
RB	34	Jadyn Jones	So
RB	35	Quinton Ezzard	So
TE	36	Jordan Collins	Fr
RB	37	Shane Reynolds	Sr
TE	38	Brayden Robertson	Fr
RB	41	Stefan Egbe	Jr
TE	43	Gavin Noe	Jr
RB	44	Aydin Woolfolk	So
TE	45	Will Miles	So
RB	46	Alex Tecza	Fr
TE	47	Justice Rider	Jr
TE	49	Merrick Barlow	Fr
OT	50	Malcolm Johnson	Fr
OT	51	James Cardinali	Fr
G	52	Matt Tomaszewski	Fr
G	53	Jace Williams	Fr
G	54	Hunter Fay	Fr
OT	55	Logan Wegman	Fr
G	56	Wyatt Ferguson	Fr
G	57	John Hebert	Fr
G	59	Paul McClune IV	Fr
G	60	Zarian Simms	Jr
OT	61	Drew Fontana	So
OT	62	Jake Lusk	Sr
G	64	Carmello Michel	So
G	65	Will Hampton	Fr
OT	65	Connor Heater	So
OT	66	Jaylin Acevedo	So
G	67	Fernando Baker	So
G	68	Ben Purvis	Sr
C	69	Cam Nichols	Jr
C	70	Jake Polito	So
G	71	Isaac Bunker	Jr
G	72	Greyson Crawford	Sr
OT	73	Sean Crowley	So
OT	74	Mack Taylor	So
OT	75	Hansen Collie	So
G	76	Cooper Gardiner	Fr
G	77	Harry Spencer	Sr
C	78	Ben Reiland	Jr
G	79	Hoke Smith II	Jr
WR	80	Arnel Heathington	Jr
WR	81	Casey Smith	Jr
WR	82	Nathan Kent	Sr
TE	83	Cody Howard	Sr
WR	84	Kendall Evans	Jr
TE	85	Jake Norris	Jr
WR	86	Joshua Guerin	Jr
TE	87	Theo Elwell	So
WR	88	Justin Bonsu	So
WR	89	Luke Hutchinson	Jr
C	93	Toran Smith	So

Defense

Pos.	#	Name	Class
OLB	0	Kenneth McShan	Sr
S	1	Seth English	Jr
S	2	Maxwell Williams	So
CB	3	Irabonoise Oniha	Jr
S	4	Adam Walker II	Sr
S	5	Matthew Seliga	Jr
CB	6	Kenneth Hall	Sr
S	7	Kush'i Abraham	Jr
S	8	Aaron Rose	So
CB	8	Collin Seals	Fr
S	9	Joshua Switzer	Jr
CB	10	Nick Bell	So
S	13	Andrew Duhart	Sr
OLB	14	Jaxson Campbell	Sr
CB	15	Xavier LeJeune	So
S	16	Giuseppe Sessi	Jr
CB	17	Justin Ross	So
CB	18	Phillip Hamilton	So
S	20	Trent Gillis	Fr
OLB	21	JaSean McLean	Jr
OLB	22	Conner Lessane	Jr
CB	23	Derajah Hardy	Fr
S	24	Carson de Avila	Jr
S	25	Jaxson Jewell	Fr
S	26	Knowel Smith	Fr
CB	28	Bryce Allen	Jr
S	29	Trent Gray	Fr
DE	31	Garrison Dibble	Fr
LB	31	Cody Fair	Fr
OLB	32	Justin Coles	So
LB	33	Ian Pourciau	Sr
CB	34	Mekhai Coleman	Fr
DE	34	Benjamin Franklin	So
OLB	35	Luke Pirris	Sr
CB	35	Austin Stull	Fr
S	36	Akeem Clark	Fr
OLB	36	Jake Moore	So
OLB	37	Luke Lawson	Jr
OLB	38	Daveon Jones	So
LB	39	Job Grant	Jr
LB	40	Brady O'Connor	Fr
LB	40	Cam Robinson	Fr
OLB	41	Mackenzie Ardoin	Fr
S	42	Will Ross	So
OLB	43	Matt Karpinsky	So
S	44	Jonah Cali	Fr
LB	44	Christian Johnson	Fr
S	45	Brady Wine	Sr
LB	46	Noah Beck	So
LB	47	Harry Beacham III	So
LB	49	Adam Klenk	Sr
OLB	50	Gavin Woods	Jr
LB	51	Liam Barbee	Sr
LB	52	Nolan McCamy	Jr
LB	53	Marcus Bleazard	Jr
LB	54	Teddy Androus	So
OLB	55	Bishop Rellah	Fr
LB	56	MarcAnthony Parker	So
LB	57	Mason Frey	Fr
OLB	57	Dylan Spelios	Sr
LB	58	Coleman Cauley	Jr
OLB	59	Jacob Asbeck	So
LB	59	Parker Turner	Fr
NG	64	Chris Herock	So
DE	70	Ikenna Ozurumba	Jr
DT	71	Bryce Rothwell	Fr
DT	72	Clancy Orie	Fr
DT	73	Rhoen Breen	Fr
NG	74	Cole Long	Fr
NG	75	TaMarques McNeal	So
NG	76	Terrence McCauley	Jr
NG	77	Connor Young	Fr
DE	78	Jaden Brock	Fr
DE	79	Clinton Anyagafu	Fr
OLB	80	Brandon Ihle	Fr
OLB	81	Will Miller	Fr
OLB	82	Jaden Mangini	Fr
OLB	83	Nash Beenen	Fr
OLB	84	Gavin Widener	Fr
OLB	85	Amahd Clark	Fr
OLB	87	Henry Rothwell	So
OLB	88	Dom Purcell	So
DE	90	Julien Moutome	So
DE	91	Chreign LaFond	Sr
NG	92	Alex McCalop	Jr
DE	93	Aiden Lyczek	So
NG	94	Xavyer Arrington	So
DT	95	Griffen Willis	Jr
NG	96	Landon Robinson	Sr
DT	97	Matt Reyes	Jr
DT	98	Kendall Whiteside	Sr
DE	99	Tyler Narayan	Sr

Special teams

Pos.	#	Name	Class
K, P	15	Jacob Carlson	So
K	17	Nathan Kirkwood	Sr
P	33	Stephen Glenn	Sr
P	90	Jack Armbruster	Fr
LS	91	Eli Cronic	Fr
LS	92	Rayne Fry	Jr
K	93	Danis Bajric	Fr
LS	94	Jaxon Endres	Fr
K	95	Justin Welch	Fr
P	97	Roman Hyland	Fr
LS	98	Landon Purcell	Fr
K	99	Lance Gossett	Jr

Head coach

- Brian Newberry

Coordinators/assistant coaches

- Drew Cronic
  Offensive coordinator
- P. J. Volker
  Defensive coordinator/linebackers
- Ricky Brown
  Special teams coordinator/outside linebackers
- Jerrick Hall
  Defensive run game coordinator/defensive line
- Eric Lewis
  Defensive pass game coordinator/safeties
- David Cole
  Snipes
- Robert Green
  Cornerbacks
- Jay Guillermo
  Offensive line
- Ivin Jasper
  Quarterbacks/running backs
- Tommy Laurendine
  Offensive line
- Va’a Niumatalolo
  Defensive line
- Jon Williams
  Tight ends
- Brenten Wimberly
  Linebackers
- Mick Yokitis
  Wide receivers

Legend

- (C) Team captain
- (S) Suspended
- (I) Ineligible
- Injured
- Redshirt

Roster

== Game summaries ==
=== VMI (FCS) ===
VMI Keydets (FCS) (0–0) at Navy Midshipmen (0–0) – Game summary

Quarter	1	2	3	4	Total
Keydets (FCS)	0	0	7	0	7
Midshipmen	7	21	10	14	52

at Navy–Marine Corps Memorial Stadium • Annapolis, Maryland

- Date: August 30
- Game time: 12:00 p.m. EDT
- Game weather: Sunny • Temperature: 72 °F (22 °C) • Wind: S at 7 miles per hour (11 km/h)
- Game attendance: 30,014
- Referee: Matt Overton
- TV announcers (CBSSN): Chris Lewis (play-by-play), Randy Cross (analyst) and Brandon Baylor (sideline)

Game information

First quarter

- (6:00) NAVY – Michael Barrow 7-yard run, Nathan Kirkwood kick (Drive: 11 plays, 70 yards, 5:45; Navy 7–0)

Second quarter

- (11:07) NAVY – Eli Heidenreich 18-yard pass from Blake Horvath, Nathan Kirkwood kick (Drive: 4 plays, 35 yards, 1:51; Navy 14–0)
- (5:17) NAVY – Alex Tecza 6-yard run, Nathan Kirkwood kick (Drive: 6 plays, 43 yards, 2:31; Navy 21–0)
- (0:48) NAVY – Eli Heidenreich 4-yard run, Nathan Kirkwood kick (Drive: 6 plays, 78 yards, 1:38; Navy 28–0)

Third quarter

- (7:22) NAVY – Nathan Kirkwood 28-yard field goal (Drive: 15 plays, 66 yards, 7:33; Navy 31–0)
- (7:13) VMI – Owen Sweeney 75-yard pass from Collin Shannon, Ben Shrewsbury kick (Drive: 1 play, 75 yards, 0:09; Navy 31–7)
- (0:50) NAVY – Braxton Woodson 74-yard run, Nathan Kirkwood kick (Drive: 3 plays, 80 yards, 1:37; Navy 38–7)

Fourth quarter

- (9:39) NAVY – Braxton Woodson 68-yard run, Nathan Kirkwood kick (Drive: 4 plays, 94 yards, 1:54; Navy 45–7)
- (2:37) NAVY – Shane Reynolds 4-yard run, Nathan Kirkwood kick (Drive: 10 plays, 65 yards, 5:57; Navy 52–7)

Statistics	VMI	NAVY
First downs	9	26
Plays–yards	50–212	68–560
Rushes–yards	22–15	54–468
Passing yards	197	92
Passing: comp–att–int	16–28–0	9–14–0
Turnovers	0	0
Time of possession	24:33	35:27

Team	Category	Player	Statistics
VMI	Passing	Collin Shannon	16/25, 197 yards, TD
VMI	Rushing	Leo Boehling	8 carries, 21 yards
VMI	Receiving	Owen Sweeney	5 receptions, 126 yards, TD
Navy	Passing	Blake Horvath	6/7, 66 yards, TD
Navy	Rushing	Braxton Woodson	7 carries, 180 yards, 2 TD
Navy	Receiving	Eli Heidenreich	6 receptions, 65 yards, TD

=== UAB ===
UAB Blazers (1–0) at Navy Midshipmen (1–0) – Game summary

Quarter	1	2	3	4	Total
Blazers	7	17	0	0	24
Midshipmen	14	10	7	7	38

at Navy–Marine Corps Memorial Stadium • Annapolis, Maryland

- Date: September 6
- Game time: 3:30 p.m. EDT
- Game weather: Sunny • Temperature: 84 °F (29 °C) • Wind: SE at 15 miles per hour (24 km/h)
- Game attendance: 28,325
- Referee: Steven Anderson
- TV announcers (CBSSN): Chris Lewis (play-by-play), Randy Cross (analyst) and Brandon Baylor (sideline)

Game information

First quarter

- (12:36) NAVY – Blake Horvath 1-yard run, Nathan Kirkwood kick (Drive: 5 plays, 75 yards, 2:24; Navy 7–0)
- (9:41) UAB – Iverson Hooks 51-yard pass from Jalen Kitna, Jonah Delange kick (Drive: 6 plays, 75 yards, 2:55; Tied 7–7)
- (3:06) NAVY – Eli Heidenreich 9-yard run, Nathan Kirkwood kick (Drive: 14 plays, 75 yards, 6:35; Navy 14–7)

Second quarter

- (14:14) UAB – Corri Milliner 25-yard pass from Jalen Kitna, Jonah Delange kick (Drive: 8 plays, 65 yards, 3:52; Tied 14–14)
- (12:16) NAVY – Luke Hutchison 63-yard pass from Blake Horvath, Nathan Kirkwood kick (Drive: 4 plays, 74 yards, 1:51; Navy 21–14)
- (11:19) UAB – Jevon Jackson 12-yard run, Jonah Delange kick (Drive: 3 plays, 75 yards, 0:57; Tied 21–21)
- (4:54) NAVY – Nathan Kirkwood 27-yard field goal (Drive: 10 plays, 65 yards, 6:25; Navy 24–21)
- (0:00) UAB – Jonah Delange 40-yard field goal (Drive: 11 plays, 70 yards, 4:44; Tied 24–24)

Third quarter

- (4:12) NAVY – Blake Horvath 4-yard run, Nathan Kirkwood kick (Drive: 6 plays, 29 yards, 2:23; Navy 31–24)

Fourth quarter

- (14:57) NAVY – Alex Tecza 1-yard run, Nathan Kirkwood kick (Drive: 5 plays, 82 yards, 2:55; Navy 38–24)

Statistics	UAB	NAVY
First downs	23	20
Plays–yards	60–413	59–463
Rushes–yards	27–92	51–295
Passing yards	321	168
Passing: comp–att–int	23–33–2	6–8–0
Turnovers	3	0
Time of possession	27:38	32:22

Team	Category	Player	Statistics
UAB	Passing	Jalen Kitna	22/32, 304 yards, 2 TD, 2 INT
UAB	Rushing	Jevon Jackson	15 carries, 66 yards, TD
UAB	Receiving	Corri Milliner	6 receptions, 100 yards, TD
Navy	Passing	Blake Horvath	6/8, 168 yards, TD
Navy	Rushing	Alex Tecza	15 carries, 111 yards, TD
Navy	Receiving	Cody Howard	1 reception, 65 yards

=== at Tulsa ===
Navy Midshipmen (2–0) at Tulsa Golden Hurricane (1–1) – Game summary

Quarter	1	2	3	4	Total
Midshipmen	7	14	14	7	42
Golden Hurricane	14	3	0	6	23

at H.A. Chapman Stadium • Tulsa, Oklahoma

- Date: September 13
- Game time: 8:00 p.m. EDT
- Game weather: Sunny • Temperature: 87 °F (31 °C) • Wind: N at 5 miles per hour (8.0 km/h)
- Game attendance: 20,103
- Referee: Reid Jackson
- TV announcers (ESPN+): Ted Emrich (play-by-play), Barrett Brooks (analyst) and Maria Trivelpiece (sideline)

Game information

First quarter

- (12:07) TLSA – Dominic Richardson 14-yard run, Seth Morgan kick (Drive: 5 plays, 35 yards, 1:33; Tulsa 7–0)
- (2:53) TLSA – Baylor Hayes 6-yard run, Seth Morgan kick (Drive: 3 plays, 46 yards, 1:24; Tulsa 14–0)
- (0:26) NAVY – Alex Tecza 1-yard run, Nathan Kirkwood kick (Drive: 5 plays, 75 yards, 2:27; Tulsa 14–7)

Second quarter

- (5:50) NAVY – Blake Horvath 2-yard run, Nathan Kirkwood kick (Drive: 6 plays, 49 yards, 3:01; Tied 14–14)
- (1:44) TLSA – Seth Morgan 34-yard field goal (Drive: 12 plays, 59 yards, 4:06; Tulsa 17–14)
- (0:10) NAVY – Luke Hutchison 2-yard pass from Blake Horvath, Nathan Kirkwood kick (Drive: 10 plays, 75 yards, 1:34; Navy 21–17)

Third quarter

- (11:09) NAVY – Eli Heidenreich 10-yard run, Nathan Kirkwood kick (Drive: 5 plays, 56 yards, 2:27; Navy 28–17)
- (2:05) NAVY – Alex Tecza 1-yard run, Nathan Kirkwood kick (Drive: 12 plays, 48 yards, 7:20; Navy 35–17)

Fourth quarter

- (9:07) NAVY – Brandon Chatman 1-yard run, Nathan Kirkwood kick (Drive: 10 plays, 51 yards, 6:16; Navy 42–17)
- (6:08) TLSA – Calvin Johnson II 18-yard pass from Baylor Hayes, pass failed (Drive: 10 plays, 76 yards, 2:54; Navy 42–23)

Statistics	NAVY	TLSA
First downs	25	23
Plays–yards	73–461	70–329
Rushes–yards	63–367	33–140
Passing yards	94	189
Passing: comp–att–int	6–10–2	22–37–1
Turnovers	3	2
Time of possession	35:24	24:36

Team	Category	Player	Statistics
Navy	Passing	Blake Horvath	6/10, 94 yards, TD, 2 INT
Navy	Rushing	Blake Horvath	21 carries, 159 yards, TD
Navy	Receiving	Eli Heidenreich	2 receptions, 40 yards
Tulsa	Passing	Baylor Hayes	22/37, 189 yards, TD, INT
Tulsa	Rushing	Dominic Richardson	13 carries, 61 yards, TD
Tulsa	Receiving	Zion Booker	8 receptions, 90 yards

=== Rice ===
Rice Owls (3–1) at Navy Midshipmen (3–0) – Game summary

Quarter	1	2	3	4	Total
Owls	0	0	3	10	13
Midshipmen	7	7	0	7	21

at Navy–Marine Corps Memorial Stadium • Annapolis, Maryland

- Date: September 27
- Game time: 3:30 p.m. EDT
- Game weather: Cloudy • Temperature: 75 °F (24 °C) • Wind: N at 5 miles per hour (8.0 km/h)
- Game attendance: 28,873
- Referee: Charles Lamertina
- TV announcers (CBSSN): Chris Lewis (play-by-play), Randy Cross (analyst) and Brandon Baylor (sideline)

Game information

First quarter

- (7:04) NAVY – Luke Hutchison 2-yard run, Nathan Kirkwood kick (Drive: 14 plays, 75 yards, 7:56; Navy 7–0)

Second quarter

- (14:56) NAVY – Blake Horvath 8-yard run, Nathan Kirkwood kick (Drive: 3 plays, 80 yards, 1:28; Navy 14–0)

Third quarter

- (0:22) RICE – Enock Gota 35-yard field goal (Drive: 18 plays, 48 yards, 8:15; Navy 14–3)

Fourth quarter

- (10:33) NAVY – Blake Horvath 2-yard run, Nathan Kirkwood kick (Drive: 10 plays, 75 yards, 4:49; Navy 21–3)
- (7:05) RICE – Drayden Dickmann 3-yard pass from Chase Jenkins, Enock Gota kick (Drive: 7 plays, 61 yards, 3:19; Navy 21–10)
- (0:24) RICE – Enock Gota 44-yard field goal (Drive: 10 plays, 54 yards, 2:43; Navy 21–13)

Statistics	RICE	NAVY
First downs	13	19
Plays–yards	60–234	61–455
Rushes–yards	39–120	48–283
Passing yards	114	172
Passing: comp–att–int	12–21–0	8–13–1
Turnovers	0	1
Time of possession	26:31	33:29

Team	Category	Player	Statistics
Rice	Passing	Chase Jenkins	12/21, 114 yards, TD
Rice	Rushing	Quinton Jackson	15 carries, 60 yards
Rice	Receiving	Drayden Dickmann	3 receptions, 45 yards, TD
Navy	Passing	Blake Horvath	8/13, 172 yards, INT
Navy	Rushing	Blake Horvath	21 carries, 110 yards, 2 TD
Navy	Receiving	Alex Tecza	3 receptions, 53 yards

=== Air Force (Commander-in-Chief's Trophy) ===
Air Force Falcons (1–3) at Navy Midshipmen (4–0) – Game summary

Quarter	1	2	3	4	Total
Falcons	7	3	7	14	31
Midshipmen	3	14	7	10	34

at Navy–Marine Corps Memorial Stadium • Annapolis, Maryland

- Date: October 4
- Game time: 12:00 p.m. EDT
- Game weather: Sunny • Temperature: 72 °F (22 °C) • Wind: S at 5 miles per hour (8.0 km/h)
- Game attendance: 37,517
- Referee: Nolan Dumas
- TV announcers (CBS): Rich Waltz (play-by-play), Ross Tucker (analyst) and Tiffany Blackmon (sideline)

Game information

First quarter

- (11:22) NAVY – Nathan Kirkwood 39-yard field goal (Drive: 7 plays, 54 yards, 3:32; Navy 3–0)
- (9:14) AFA – Liam Szarka 7-yard run, Jacob Medina kick (Drive: 4 plays, 75 yards, 2:08; Air Force 7–3)

Second quarter

- (10:29) AFA – Jacob Medina 24-yard field goal (Drive: 9 plays, 87 yards, 4:39; Air Force 10–3)
- (8:46) NAVY – Eli Heidenreich 19-yard pass from Blake Horvath, Nathan Kirkwood kick (Drive: 4 plays, 53 yards, 1:35; Tied 10–10)
- (4:02) NAVY – Eli Heidenreich 80-yard pass from Blake Horvath, Nathan Kirkwood kick (Drive: 2 plays, 81 yards, 0:46; Navy 17–10)

Third quarter

- (9:58) AFA – Liam Szarka 1-yard run, Jacob Medina kick (Drive: 9 plays, 70 yards, 5:02; Tied 17–17)
- (5:52) NAVY – Blake Horvath 59-yard run, Nathan Kirkwood kick (Drive: 8 plays, 97 yards, 4:05; Navy 24–17)

Fourth quarter

- (14:55) AFA – Bruin Fleischmann 18-yard pass from Liam Szarka, Jacob Medina kick (Drive: 11 plays, 75 yards, 5:57; Tied 24–24)
- (12:55) NAVY – Eli Heidenreich 60-yard pass from Blake Horvath, Nathan Kirkwood kick (Drive: 4 plays, 71 yards, 1:55; Navy 31–24)
- (10:59) AFA – Jonah Dawson 53-yard pass from Liam Szarka, Jacob Medina kick (Drive: 5 plays, 75 yards, 1:56; Tied 31–31)
- (6:47) NAVY – Nathan Kirkwood 34-yard field goal (Drive: 9 plays, 60 yards, 4:05; Navy 34–31)

Statistics	AFA	NAVY
First downs	23	18
Plays–yards	65–460	55–517
Rushes–yards	45–211	29–178
Passing yards	249	339
Passing: comp–att–int	12–20–0	20–26–0
Turnovers	1	1
Time of possession	32:28	27:32

Team	Category	Player	Statistics
Air Force	Passing	Liam Szarka	11/19, 212 yards, 2 TD
Air Force	Rushing	Liam Szarka	25 carries, 152 yards, 2 TD
Air Force	Receiving	Bruin Fleischmann	6 receptions, 166 yards, TD
Navy	Passing	Blake Horvath	20/26, 339 yards, 3 TD
Navy	Rushing	Blake Horvath	17 carries, 130 yards, TD
Navy	Receiving	Eli Heidenreich	8 receptions, 243 yards, 3 TD

=== at Temple ===
Navy Midshipmen (5–0) at Temple Owls (3–2) – Game summary

Quarter	1	2	3	4	Total
Midshipmen	7	0	14	11	32
Owls	7	10	7	7	31

at Lincoln Financial Field • Philadelphia, Pennsylvania

- Date: October 11
- Game time: 4:00 p.m. EDT
- Game weather: Cloudy • Temperature: 66 °F (19 °C) • Wind: SW at 7 miles per hour (11 km/h)
- Game attendance: 26,149
- Referee: Matt Overton
- TV announcers (ESPN2): Roy Philpott (play-by-play), Sam Acho (analyst) and Taylor Davis (sideline)

Game information

First quarter

- (10:18) NAVY – Cody Howard 50-yard pass from Blake Horvath, Nathan Kirkwood kick (Drive: 4 plays, 79 yards, 2:01; Navy 7–0)
- (3:19) TEM – Evan Simon 2-yard run, Carl Hardin kick (Drive: 13 plays, 75 yards, 6:59; Tied 7–7)

Second quarter

- (14:13) TEM – Carl Hardin 23-yard field goal (Drive: 8 plays, 64 yards, 2:58; Temple 10–7)
- (0:25) TEM – Jay Ducker 1-yard run, Carl Hardin kick (Drive: 10 plays, 81 yards, 2:18; Temple 17–7)

Third quarter

- (9:59) NAVY – Blake Horvath 2-yard run, Nathan Kirkwood kick (Drive: 9 plays, 74 yards, 4:55; Temple 17–14)
- (6:37) TEM – JoJo Bermudez 26-yard pass from Evan Simon, Carl Hardin kick (Drive: 6 plays, 72 yards, 3:17; Temple 24–14)
- (2:22) NAVY – Alex Tecza 2-yard run, Nathan Kirkwood kick (Drive: 9 plays, 75 yards, 4:15; Temple 24–21)

Fourth quarter

- (6:34) NAVY – Nathan Kirkwood 48-yard field goal (Drive: 15 plays, 59 yards, 8:14; Tied 24–24)
- (1:16) TEM – Jay Ducker 1-yard run, Carl Hardin kick (Drive: 11 plays, 75 yards, 5:18; Temple 31–24)
- (0:39) NAVY – Blake Horvath 51-yard run, Alex Tecza pass from Blake Horvath for 2-pt (Drive: 5 plays, 75 yards, 0:37; Navy 32–31)

Statistics	NAVY	TEM
First downs	15	27
Plays–yards	54–384	75–520
Rushes–yards	37–243	39–175
Passing yards	141	345
Passing: comp–att–int	6–17–0	25–36–0
Turnovers	0	1
Time of possession	25:58	34:02

Team	Category	Player	Statistics
Navy	Passing	Blake Horvath	6/16, 141 yards, TD
Navy	Rushing	Blake Horvath	19 carries, 155 yards, 2 TD
Navy	Receiving	Eli Heidenreich	3 receptions, 72 yards
Temple	Passing	Evan Simon	25/36, 345 yards, TD
Temple	Rushing	Jay Ducker	24 carries, 97 yards, 2 TD
Temple	Receiving	Kajiya Hollawayne	9 receptions, 146 yards

=== Florida Atlantic ===
Florida Atlantic Owls (3–4) at Navy Midshipmen (6–0) – Game summary

Quarter	1	2	3	4	Total
Owls	10	3	0	19	32
Midshipmen	14	7	0	21	42

at Navy–Marine Corps Memorial Stadium • Annapolis, Maryland

- Date: October 25
- Game time: 3:30 p.m. EDT
- Game weather: Cloudy • Temperature: 60 °F (16 °C) • Wind: SW at 5 miles per hour (8.0 km/h)
- Game attendance: 32,175
- Referee: Reid Jackson
- TV announcers (CBSSN): Chris Lewis (play-by-play), Randy Cross (analyst) and Brandon Baylor (sideline)

Game information

First quarter

- FAU – Jayshon Platt 43-yard pass from Caden Veltkamp (Garrison Smith kick), 12:17. Owls 7–0. Drive: 10 plays, 75 yards, 2:43.
- NAVY – Blake Horvath 7-yard run (Nathan Kirkwood kick), 7:38. Tied 7–7. Drive: 8 plays, 72 yards, 4:33.
- NAVY – Braxton Woodson 16-yard run (Nathan Kirkwood kick), 6:16. Midshipmen 14–7. Drive: 2 plays, 23 yards, 0:45.
- FAU – Garrison Smith 30-yard field goal, 2:35. Midshipmen 14–10. Drive: 9 plays, 56 yards, 3:35.

Second quarter

- NAVY – Blake Horvath 7-yard run (Nathan Kirkwood kick), 11:45. Midshipmen 21–10. Drive: 11 plays, 75 yards, 5:50.
- FAU – Garrison Smith 38-yard field goal, 7:37. Midshipmen 21–13. Drive: 9 plays, 58 yards, 4:04.

Third quarter

- No scoring plays.

Fourth quarter

- NAVY – Alex Tecza 1-yard run (Nathan Kirkwood kick), 13:47. Midshipmen 28–13. Drive: 3 plays, 41 yards, 1:13.
- NAVY – Blake Horvath 19-yard run (Nathan Kirkwood kick), 9:40. Midshipmen 35–13. Drive: 4 plays, 41 yards, 2:09.
- FAU – Kaden Shields-Dutton 5-yard pass from Caden Veltkamp (pass failed), 5:38. Midshipmen 35–19. Drive: 16 plays, 85 yards, 3:57.
- NAVY – Blake Horvath 31-yard run (Nathan Kirkwood kick), 5:29. Midshipmen 42–19. Drive: 1 play, 35 yards, 0:09.
- FAU – Jabari Smith Jr. 4-yard pass from Zach Gibson (pass failed), 2:00. Midshipmen 42–25. Drive: 13 plays, 60 yards, 3:29.
- FAU – Jabari Smith Jr. 9-yard pass from Zach Gibson (Garrison Smith kick), 1:10. Midshipmen 42–32. Drive: 5 plays, 37 yards, 0:49.

Statistics	FAU	NAVY
First downs	23	26
Plays–yards	81–450	69–503
Rushes–yards	26–69	56–397
Passing yards	381	106
Passing: comp–att–int	34–55–1	9–13–0
Turnovers	3	1
Time of possession	26:46	33:14

Team	Category	Player	Statistics
Florida Atlantic	Passing	Caden Veltkamp	25/41, 299 yards, 2 TD, INT
Florida Atlantic	Rushing	Gemari Sands	7 carries, 22 yards
Florida Atlantic	Receiving	Jayshon Platt	5 receptions, 121 yards, TD
Navy	Passing	Blake Horvath	8/12, 83 yards
Navy	Rushing	Blake Horvath	21 carries, 174 yards, 4 TD
Navy	Receiving	Brandon Chatman	5 receptions, 43 yards

=== at North Texas ===
Navy Midshipmen (7–0) at North Texas Mean Green (7–1) – Game summary

Quarter	1	2	3	4	Total
Midshipmen	0	10	7	0	17
Mean Green	14	10	7	0	31

at DATCU Stadium • Denton, Texas

- Date: November 1
- Game time: 12:00 p.m. EDT
- Game weather: Cloudy • Temperature: 61 °F (16 °C) • Wind: NW at 8 miles per hour (13 km/h)
- Game attendance: 26,516
- Referee: Edwin Lee
- TV announcers (ESPN2): Lowell Galindo (play-by-play), Aaron Murray (analyst) and Lauren Sisler (sideline)

Game information

First quarter

- (11:57) UNT – Caleb Hawkins 7-yard run, Kali Nguma kick (Drive: 8 plays, 76 yards, 2:59; North Texas 7–0)
- (3:32) UNT – Caleb Hawkins 3-yard run, Kali Nguma kick (Drive: 10 plays, 86 yards, 3:31; North Texas 14–0)

Second quarter

- (7:14) NAVY – Nathan Kirkwood 26-yard field goal (Drive: 12 plays, 54 yards, 6:48; North Texas 14–3)
- (5:46) UNT – Caleb Hawkins 14-yard run, Kali Nguma kick (Drive: 5 plays, 31 yards, 1:28; North Texas 21–3)
- (1:59) NAVY – Brandon Chatman 31-yard run, Nathan Kirkwood kick (Drive: 6 plays, 61 yards, 3:39; North Texas 21–10)
- (0:03) UNT – Kali Nguma 21-yard field goal (Drive: 11 plays, 75 yards, 1:52; North Texas 24–10)

Third quarter

- (9:48) NAVY – Blake Horvath 13-yard run, Nathan Kirkwood kick (Drive: 8 plays, 70 yards, 5:12; North Texas 24–17)
- (0:46) UNT – Caleb Hawkins 6-yard run, Kali Nguma kick (Drive: 10 plays, 50 yards, 4:13; North Texas 31–17)

Fourth quarter

- No scoring plays.

Statistics	NAVY	UNT
First downs	22	22
Plays–yards	58–391	69–424
Rushes–yards	44–311	45–190
Passing yards	80	234
Passing: comp–att–int	8–14–2	19–24–0
Turnovers	3	0
Time of possession	32:13	27:47

Team	Category	Player	Statistics
Navy	Passing	Blake Horvath	8/14, 80 yards, 2 INT
Navy	Rushing	Blake Horvath	19 carries, 112 yards, TD
Navy	Receiving	Eli Heidenreich	6 receptions, 68 yards
North Texas	Passing	Drew Mestemaker	19/24, 234 yards
North Texas	Rushing	Caleb Hawkins	33 carries, 197 yards, 4 TD
North Texas	Receiving	Cameron Dorner	3 receptions, 78 yards

=== at No. 10 Notre Dame (rivalry) ===
Navy Midshipmen (7–1) at No. 10 Notre Dame Fighting Irish (6–2) – Game summary

Quarter	1	2	3	4	Total
Midshipmen	0	10	0	0	10
No. 10 Fighting Irish	7	14	21	7	49

at Notre Dame Stadium • Notre Dame, Indiana

- Date: November 8
- Game time: 7:30 p.m. EST
- Game weather: Rain, 41 °F (5 °C), Wind E @ 5 mph (8 km/h)
- Game attendance: 77,622
- Referee: Kevin Randall
- TV announcers (NBC): Noah Eagle (play-by-play), Todd Blackledge (analyst), and Kathryn Tappen (sideline)

Game information

First quarter

- (7:31) ND – Jeremiyah Love 1-yard run, Erik Schmidt kick (Drive: 7 plays, 94 yards, 4:06, Notre Dame 7–0)

Second quarter

- (11:02) NAVY – Braxton Woodson 2-yard run, Nathan Kirkwood kick (Drive: 8 plays, 53 yards, 4:19, Tied 7–7)
- (5:57) ND – Jadarian Price 2-yard run, Erik Schmidt kick (Drive: 9 plays, 71 yards, 5:02, Notre Dame 14–7)
- (1:42) ND – Jordan Faison 5-yard pass from CJ Carr, Erik Schmidt kick (Drive: 7 plays, 68 yards, 2:43, Notre Dame 21–7)
- (0:15) NAVY – Nathan Kirkwood 33-yard field goal (Drive: 9 plays, 59 yards, 1:27, Notre Dame 21–10)

Third quarter

- (13:27) ND – Jeremiyah Love 48-yard run, Erik Schmidt kick (Drive: 4 plays, 65 yards, 1:33, Notre Dame 28–10)
- (11:27) ND – KK Smith 34-yard pass from CJ Carr, Erik Schmidt kick (Drive: 1 play, 34 yards, 0:07, Notre Dame 35–10)
- (6:27) ND – Ty Washington 4-yard pass from CJ Carr, Erik Schmidt kick (Drive: 6 plays, 49 yards, 3:21, Notre Dame 42–10)

Fourth quarter

- (11:27) ND – Aneyas Williams 54-yard run, Erik Schmidt kick (Drive: 9 plays, 93 yards, 5:13, Notre Dame 49–10)

Statistics	NAVY	ND
First downs	13	23
Plays–yards	55–228	57–502
Rushes–yards	45–206	38–249
Passing yards	22	253
Passing: Comp–Att–Int	3–10–0	16–19–0
Turnovers	0	0
Time of possession	29:23	30:37

Team	Category	Player	Statistics
Navy	Passing	Braxton Woodson	3/8, 22 yards
Navy	Rushing	Braxton Woodson	23 carries, 101 yards, TD
Navy	Receiving	Eli Heidenreich	2 receptions, 20 yards
Notre Dame	Passing	CJ Carr	13/16, 218 yards, 3 TD
Notre Dame	Rushing	Jeremiyah Love	13 carries, 94 yards, 2 TD
Notre Dame	Receiving	Malachi Fields	4 receptions, 97 yards

=== No. 24 South Florida ===
No. 24 South Florida Bulls (7–2) at Navy Midshipmen (7–2) – Game summary

Quarter	1	2	3	4	Total
No. 24 Bulls	3	6	7	22	38
Midshipmen	14	10	0	17	41

at Navy–Marine Corps Memorial Stadium • Annapolis, Maryland

- Date: November 15
- Game time: 12:00 p.m. EST
- Game weather: Cloudy • Temperature: 54 °F (12 °C) • Wind: S at 5 miles per hour (8.0 km/h)
- Game attendance: 34,856
- Referee: Tim Rich
- TV announcers (ESPN2): Roy Philpott (play-by-play), Sam Acho (analyst), and Taylor Davis (sideline)

Game information

First quarter

- (9:58) NAVY – Alex Tecza 76-yard run, Nathan Kirkwood kick (Drive: 5 plays, 88 yards, 1:53, Navy 7–0)
- (6:40) USF – Nico Gramatica 22-yard field goal (Drive: 7 plays, 77 yards, 3:07, Navy 7–3)
- (0:00) NAVY – Brandon Chatman 4-yard run, Nathan Kirkwood kick (Drive: 3 plays, 89 yards, 1:10, Navy 14–3)

Second quarter

- (12:53) USF – Keshaun Singleton 12-yard pass from Byrum Brown (Drive: 5 plays, 75 yards, 2:07, Navy 14–9)
- (7:00) NAVY – Alex Tecza 14-yard pass from Blake Horvath, Nathan Kirkwood kick (Drive: 4 plays, 44 yards, 1:56, Navy 21–9)
- (4:30) NAVY – Nathan Kirkwood 44-yard field goal (Drive: 4 plays, -11 yards, 1:55, Navy 24–9)

Third quarter

- (12:32) USF – Byrum Brown 3-yard run, Nico Gramatica kick (Drive: 4 plays, 68 yards, 1:05, Navy 24–16)

Fourth quarter

- (14:17) NAVY – Nathan Kirkwood 44-yard field goal (Drive: 9 plays, 38 yards, 4:28, Navy 27–16)
- (13:59) USF – Byrum Brown 60-yard run, Mudia Reuben pass (Drive: 1 play, 75 yards, 0:18, Navy 27–24)
- (9:29) NAVY – Braxton Woodson 20-yard run, Nathan Kirkwood kick (Drive: 8 plays, 75 yards, 4:30, Navy 34–24)
- (6:14) USF – Jeremiah Koger 29-yard pass from Nykahi Davenport (Drive: 11 plays, 83 yards, 3:09, Navy 34–30)
- (3:59) NAVY – Braxton Woodson 64-yard run, Nathan Kirkwood kick (Drive: 4 plays, 75 yards, 2:15, Navy 41–30)
- (1:55) USF – Mudia Reuben 41-yard pass from Byrum Brown, Keshaun Singleton pass (Drive: 6 plays, 75 yards, 2:04, Navy 41–38)

Statistics	USF	NAVY
First downs	23	21
Plays–yards	69–556	72–524
Rushes–yards	36–200	53–338
Passing yards	356	186
Passing: comp–att–int	24–33–1	10–19–0
Turnovers	2	1
Time of possession	24:49	3511

Team	Category	Player	Statistics
South Florida	Passing	Byrum Brown	23/32, 327 yards, 2 TD, INT
South Florida	Rushing	Byrum Brown	17 carries, 136 yards, 2 TD
South Florida	Receiving	Jeremiah Koger	9 receptions, 112 yards
Navy	Passing	Blake Horvath	8/15, 147 yards, TD
Navy	Rushing	Alex Tecza	12 carries, 126 yards, TD
Navy	Receiving	Eli Heidenreich	5 receptions, 146 yards

=== at Memphis ===
Navy Midshipmen (8-2) at Memphis Tigers (8-3) – Game summary

Quarter	1	2	3	4	Total
Midshipmen	0	14	7	7	28
Tigers	3	14	0	0	17

at Simmons Bank Liberty Stadium • Memphis, Tennessee

- Date: November 27
- Game time: 7:30 p.m. EST
- Game weather: Clear • Temperature: 42 °F (6 °C) • Wind: NE at 2 miles per hour (3.2 km/h)
- Game attendance: 27,082
- Referee: Charles Lamertina
- TV announcers (ESPN): Matt Barrie (play-by-play), Tom Luginbill (analyst) and Harry Lyles Jr. (sideline)

Game information

First quarter

- (5:35) MEM – Gianni Spetic 31-yard field goal (Drive: 11 plays, 46 yards, 6:26, Memphis 3–0)

Second quarter

- (12:11) NAVY – Kendall Evans 3-yard pass from Blake Horvath, Nathan Kirkwood kick (Drive: 7 plays, 57 yards, 3:20, Navy 7–3)
- (7:28) MEM – Matt Adcock 1-yard pass from Brendon Lewis, Gianni Spetic kick (Drive: 10 plays, 75 yards, 4:37, Memphis 10–7)
- (5:13) NAVY – Alex Tecza 2-yard run, Nathan Kirkwood kick (Drive: 6 plays, 72 yards, 2:10, Navy 14–10)
- (1:43) MEM – Cortez Braham Jr. 38-yard pass from Brendon Lewis, Gianni Spetic kick (Drive: 8 plays, 77 yards, 3:24, Memphis 17–14)

Third quarter

- (1:01) NAVY – Alex Tecza 12-yard run, Nathan Kirkwood kick (Drive: 5 plays, 44 yards, 2:24, Navy 21–17)

Fourth quarter

- (5:53) NAVY – Blake Horvath 2-yard run, Nathan Kirkwood kick (Drive: 13 plays, 73 yards, 8:19, Navy 28–17)

Statistics	NAVY	MEM
First downs	21	18
Plays–yards	69–300	65–288
Rushes–yards	60–200	29–116
Passing yards	100	172
Passing: comp–att–int	5–9–0	19–36–0
Turnovers	1	0
Time of possession	35:29	24:31

Team	Category	Player	Statistics
Navy	Passing	Blake Horvath	5/9, 100 yards, TD
Navy	Rushing	Alex Tecza	26 carries, 103 yards, 2 TD
Navy	Receiving	Eli Heidenreich	2 receptions, 64 yards
Memphis	Passing	Brendon Lewis	19/36, 172 yards, 2 TD
Memphis	Rushing	Brendon Lewis	10 carries, 36 yards
Memphis	Receiving	Cortez Braham Jr.	4 receptions, 65 yards, TD

=== vs. Army (Army–Navy Game) ===
126th Army-Navy Game
Army Black Knights (6–5) vs Navy Midshipmen (9–2) – Game summary

Quarter	1	2	3	4	Total
Black Knights	0	13	3	0	16
Midshipmen	7	0	3	7	17

at M&T Bank Stadium • Baltimore, Maryland

- Date: December 13
- Game time: 3:00 p.m. EST
- Game weather: Sunny • Temperature: 41 °F (5 °C) • Wind: W at 5 miles per hour (8.0 km/h)
- Game attendance: 70,936
- Referee: Tim Rich
- TV announcers (CBS): Brad Nessler (play-by-play), Gary Danielson (analyst), and Jenny Dell (sideline reporter)

Game information

First quarter

- (7:16) NAVY – Blake Horvath 5-yard run, Nathan Kirkwood kick (Drive: 13 plays, 75 yards, 7:44; Navy 7–0)

Second quarter

- (14:55) ARMY – Cale Hellums 2-yard run, Dawson Jones kick (Drive: 13 plays, 75 yards, 7:21; Tied 7–7)
- (3:45) ARMY – Dawson Jones 20-yard field goal (Drive: 14 plays, 63 yards, 8:52; Army 10–7)
- (0:03) ARMY – Dawson Jones 45-yard field goal (Drive: 4 plays, 27 yards, 0:20; Army 13–7)

Third quarter

- (9:39) ARMY – Dawson Jones 48-yard field goal (Drive: 4 plays, 2 yards, 2:09; Army 16–7)
- (2:59) NAVY – Nathan Kirkwood 21-yard field goal (Drive: 13 plays, 72 yards, 6:40; Army 16–10)

Fourth quarter

- (1:54) NAVY – Eli Heidenreich 8-yard pass from Blake Horvath, Nathan Kirkwood kick (Drive: 9 plays, 50 yards, 4:47; Navy 17–16)

Statistics	ARMY	NAVY
First downs	11	17
Plays–yards	44–202	66–272
Rushes–yards	34–120	52–190
Passing yards	82	82
Passing: comp–att–int	5–10–1	7–14–1
Turnovers	1	2
Time of possession	25:25	34:36

Team	Category	Player	Statistics
Army	Passing	Cale Hellums	5/10, 82 yards, INT
Army	Rushing	Cale Hellums	25 carries, 100 yards, TD
Army	Receiving	Noah Short	3 receptions, 51 yards
Navy	Passing	Blake Horvath	7/14, 82 yards, TD, INT
Navy	Rushing	Blake Horvath	34 carries, 107 yards, TD, FUM
Navy	Receiving	Eli Heidenreich	6 receptions, 72 yards, TD

=== vs Cincinnati (Liberty Bowl) ===
2026 AutoZone Liberty Bowl
Navy Midshipmen (10–2) vs Cincinnati Bearcats (7–5) – Game summary

Quarter	1	2	3	4	Total
Midshipmen	7	7	7	14	35
Bearcats	0	7	0	6	13

at Simmons Bank Liberty Stadium • Memphis, TN

- Date: January 2, 2026
- Game time: 4:30 p.m. EST
- Game weather: Rain • Temperature: 52 °F (11 °C) • Wind: 8 mph (13 km/h) north
- Game attendance: 21,908
- Referee: David Smith (SEC)
- TV announcers (ESPN): Mike Monaco (play-by-play), Kirk Morrison (analyst) and Dawn Davenport (sideline)

Game information

First quarter

- NAVY – Blake Horvath 2-yard run (Nathan Kirkwood kick), 3:19. Midshipmen 7–0. Drive: 7 plays, 63 yards, 4:22.

Second quarter

- CIN – Samaj Jones 6-yard run (Stephen Rusnak kick), 9:47. Tied 7–7. Drive: 17 plays, 75 yards, 8:32.
- NAVY – Luke Hutchison 30-yard pass from Blake Horvath (Nathan Kirkwood kick), 0:40. Midshipmen 14–7. Drive: 11 plays, 80 yards, 3:10.

Third quarter

- NAVY – Eli Heidenreich 13-yard pass from Blake Horvath (Nathan Kirkwood kick), 10:15. Midshipmen 21–7. Drive: 8 plays, 75 yards, 4:39.

Fourth quarter

- NAVY – Alex Tecza 3-yard run (Nathan Kirkwood kick), 10:00. Midshipmen 28–7. Drive: 14 plays, 56 yards, 7:44.
- CIN – Cyrus Allen 4-yard pass from Brady Lichtenberg (pass failed), 6:52. Midshipmen 28–13. Drive: 8 plays, 75 yards, 3:08.
- NAVY – Coleman Cauley 5-yard interception return (Nathan Kirkwood kick), 2:54. Midshipmen 35–13.

Statistics	NAVY	CIN
First downs	22	12
Plays–yards	66–349	58–239
Rushes–yards	51–241	38–142
Passing yards	108	97
Passing: comp–att–int	9–15–0	12–20–1
Turnovers	1	2
Time of possession	33:42	26:18

Team	Category	Player	Statistics
Navy	Passing	Blake Horvath	9/15, 108 yards, 2 TD
Navy	Rushing	Alex Tecza	16 carries, 80 yards, TD
Navy	Receiving	Eli Heidenreich	5 receptions, 64 yards, TD
Cincinnati	Passing	Brady Lichtenberg	10/15, 78 yards, TD, INT
Cincinnati	Rushing	Manny Covey	11 carries, 78 yards
Cincinnati	Receiving	Manny Covey	5 receptions, 28 yards
