= Brian Newberry (American football) =

American football coach (born 1974)

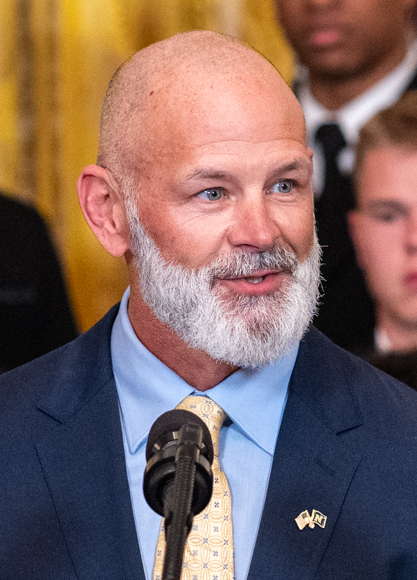
- Newberry in 2025

Current position
- Title: Head coach
- Team: Navy
- Conference: American
- Record: 30–18

Biographical details
- Born: February 26, 1974 (age 52); Oklahoma, U.S.

Playing career
- 1992–1996: Baylor
- Position: Defensive back

Coaching career (HC unless noted)
- 1999–2000: Southern Arkansas (GA)
- 2001–2002: Washington & Lee (DC/DB)
- 2003: Lehigh (assistant DB)
- 2004–2006: Washington & Lee (DC/DB)
- 2007–2010: Elon (DB)
- 2011: Sewanee (DC/LB)
- 2012: Northern Michigan (DC)
- 2015–2018: Kennesaw State (DC/DB)
- 2019–2022: Navy (DC/S)
- 2023–present: Navy

Head coaching record
- Overall: 30–18
- Bowls: 2–0

Accomplishments and honors

Championships
- 2x Commander-in-Chief's Trophy Champion (2024, 2025)

Records
- Army–Navy Game: 2-1

Brian Newberry (born February 26, 1974) is an American college football coach and former player who is currently the head football coach at the United States Naval Academy. He had previously served as the team's defensive coordinator.

== Playing career ==
After playing quarterback and safety at Westmoore High School in Oklahoma City from 1988 to 1992, Newberry committed to Baylor University. He converted to safety full time as a member of the Baylor Bears football team.

Baylor was co-Southwest Conference champion in 1994 and played in the Alamo Bowl. Injuries limited his play for much of his college career. He received his bachelor's degree in education in 1998.

== Coaching career ==
=== Navy ===
Newberry was named defensive coordinator for Navy in 2019. He was a semifinalist for the Broyles Award in 2019. On December 19, 2022, he was named the head coach for the Midshipmen.

== Personal life ==
Newberry is married to his wife, Kate, and they are the parents of a son, Max, and a daughter, Lyla.

Growing up, Newberry worked as a tour guide at Glacier National Park. He enjoys photography, to the point where he stopped coaching for six months to consider a career in the field.

== Head coaching record ==
Year	Team	Overall	Conference	Standing	Bowl/playoffs	Coaches^{#}	AP^{°}
Navy Midshipmen (American Athletic Conference / American Conference) (2023–present)
2023	Navy	5–7	4–4	T–5th			
2024	Navy	10–3	6–2	T–3rd	W Armed Forces		
2025	Navy	11–2	7–1	T–1st	W Liberty	23	23
2026	Navy	4–6	3–4				
Navy:		30–18	20–11				
Total:		30–18					
