= Eli Heidenreich =

American football player (born 2003)

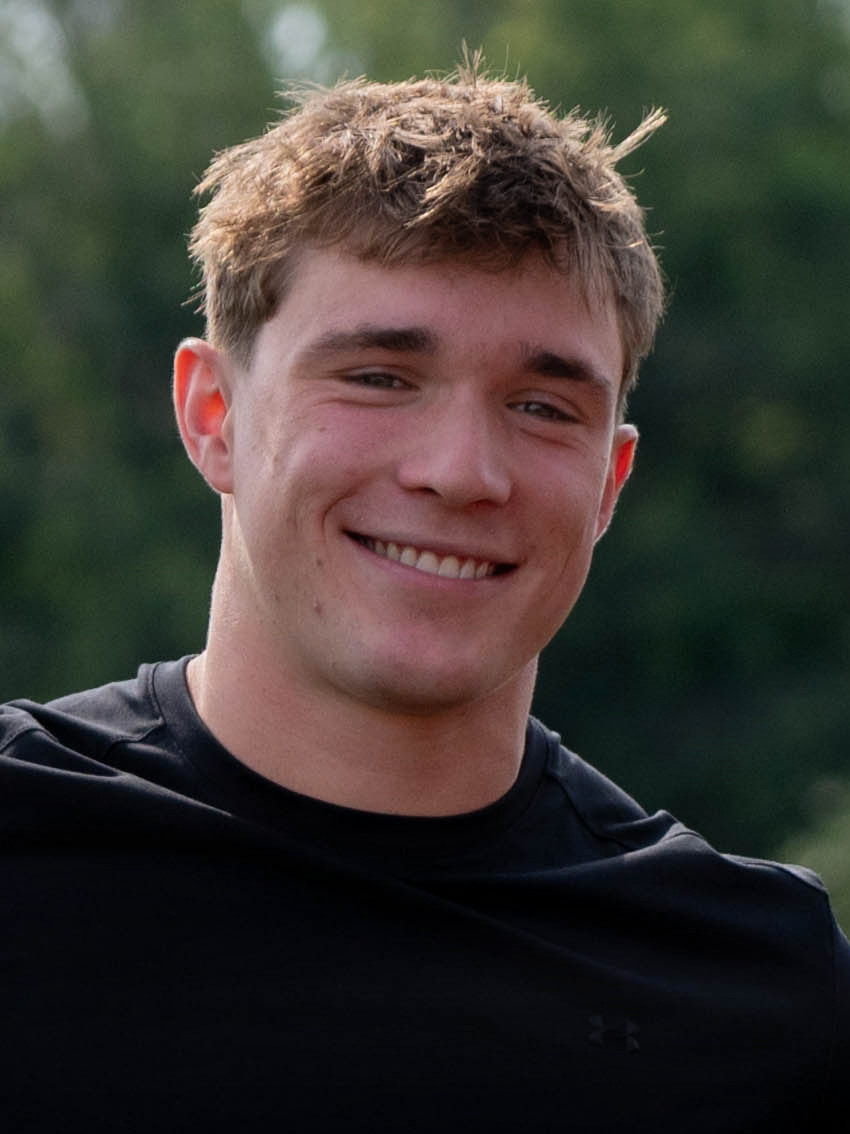
- Heidenreich in 2026

No. 29 – Pittsburgh Steelers
- Position: Running back
- Roster status: Active

Personal information
- Born: July 28, 2003 (age 23); Pittsburgh, Pennsylvania, U.S.
- Listed height: 6 ft 0 in (1.83 m)
- Listed weight: 198 lb (90 kg)

Career information
- High school: Mt. Lebanon (Mt. Lebanon, Pennsylvania)
- College: Navy (2022–2026)
- NFL draft: 2026: 7th round, 230th overall pick

Career history
- Pittsburgh Steelers (2026–present)

Awards and highlights
- Second-team All-the American (2025)

Career NFL statistics as of Week 4, 2026
- Return yards: 73
- Stats at Pro Football Reference

Elijah Heidenreich (born July 28, 2003) is an American professional football running back for the Pittsburgh Steelers of the National Football League (NFL). He played college football for the Navy Midshipmen and was selected by the Steelers in the seventh round of the 2026 NFL draft.

== Early life ==
Heidenreich attended Mt. Lebanon High School in Mt. Lebanon, Pennsylvania, a suburb of Pittsburgh. During his senior season, he finished with 54 catches for 1,325 yards and 28 touchdowns, leading his team to a state championship. Coming out of high school, Heidenreich committed to play college football for the United States Naval Academy as a Marine Corps Option Midshipman.

== College career ==
During his first season in 2022, he did not appear in any games. During the 2023 season, Heidenreich notched 214 rushing yards and a touchdown, while also bringing in 19 receptions for 382 yards and four touchdowns. In week six of the 2024 season, he notched 100 yards on the ground, while also hauling in five passes for 101 yards in a win against rival Air Force. He finished the 2024 season, rushing for 444 yards and three touchdowns, while also hauling in 39 passes for 671 yards and six touchdowns. In week six of the 2025 season, Heidenreich recorded eight receptions for 243 yards and three touchdowns in a win over rival Air Force, where he set team records for receiving yards in a game, and career receiving touchdowns. In week twelve, he set the Navy all-time receiving yards record surpassing Rob Taylor, after hauling in five passes for 146 yards in an upset win over South Florida. For his performance during the 2025 season, Heidenreich was invited to participate in the 2026 East-West Shrine Bowl.

=== Statistics ===
Year	Team	GP	Rushing				Receiving			
Year	Team	GP	Att	Yds	Avg	TD	Rec	Yds	Avg	TD
2022	Navy	0	Did not play							
2023	Navy	12	27	214	7.9	1	19	382	20.1	4
2024	Navy	13	65	444	6.8	3	39	671	17.2	6
2025	Navy	13	77	499	6.5	3	51	941	18.5	6
Career		38	169	1,157	6.8	7	109	1,994	18.3	16

== Professional career ==
Pre-draft measurables
Height	Weight	Arm length	Hand span	Wingspan	40-yard dash	10-yard split	20-yard split	20-yard shuttle	Three-cone drill	Vertical jump	Broad jump	Bench press
6 ft 0 in (1.83 m)	198 lb (90 kg)	29 1/4 in (0.74 m)	9 1/2 in (0.24 m)	6 ft 1 1/4 in (1.86 m)	4.44 s	1.55 s	2.57 s	4.22 s	6.55 s	36.0 in (0.91 m)	10 ft 0 in (3.05 m)	16 reps
All values from NFL Combine/Pro Day

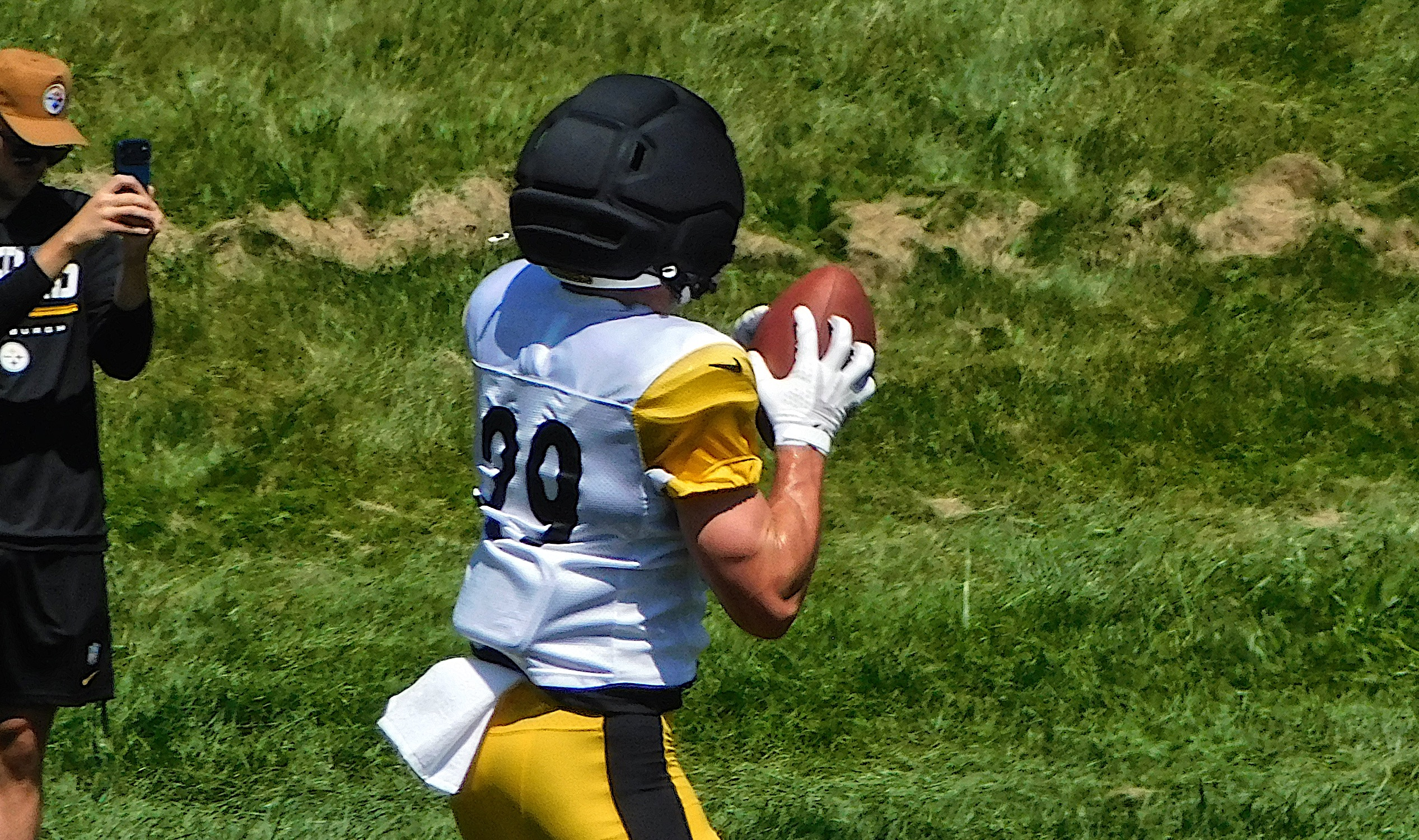
Heidenreich with the Pittsburgh Steelers in 2026

In the 2026 NFL draft, Heidenreich was selected by the Pittsburgh Steelers in the seventh round with the 230th-overall pick.

== Military commitment ==
Heidenreich committed to serving in the United States Marine Corps following his football playing career. While in the NFL, however, he will have limited to no obligations for his military service.
