= Alex Tecza =

American football player

Profile
- Position: Running back

Personal information
- Listed height: 5 ft 11 in (1.80 m)
- Listed weight: 199 lb (90 kg)

Career information
- High school: Mt. Lebanon (Mt. Lebanon, Pennsylvania)
- College: Navy (2022–2025)
- NFL draft: 2026: undrafted

Career history
- Pittsburgh Steelers (2026)*
- * Offseason or practice squad member only

Awards and highlights
- Second-team All-American Conference (2025)

Alex Tecza is an American football running back who is a free agent. He played college football for the Navy Midshipmen.

== Early life ==
Tecza attended Mt. Lebanon High School in Mt. Lebanon, Pennsylvania, 4–6 miles (6–10 km) south of downtown Pittsburgh. He committed to play college football for the Navy Midshipmen over offers from Dartmouth, Holy Cross, and Penn. During his senior season, he finished with 2,085 rushing yards and 26 touchdowns, leading his team to a state championship.

== College career ==
As a freshman in 2022, Tecza did not appear in any games. In 2023, he rushed for 758 yards and five touchdowns and caught 16 receptions for 97 yards. During the 2024 season, Tecza recorded 576 yards and eight touchdowns on the ground, while bringing in 12 receptions for 229 yards and two touchdowns. In the 2025 regular season finale, he posted 50 rushing yards in a win over rival Army. Tecza finished the 2025 season with 902 rushing yards for 10 touchdown and 13 receptions for 125 yards and a touchdown. After the season, he declared for the NFL draft.

== Professional career ==
Pre-draft measurables
Height	Weight	Arm length	Hand span	Wingspan	40-yard dash	10-yard split	20-yard split	20-yard shuttle	Three-cone drill	Vertical jump	Broad jump	Bench press
5 ft 10 3/4 in (1.80 m)	199 lb (90 kg)	29 3/8 in (0.75 m)	9 1/8 in (0.23 m)	5 ft 9 1/4 in (1.76 m)	4.57 s	1.60 s	2.64 s	4.25 s	6.77 s	34.0 in (0.86 m)	9 ft 9 in (2.97 m)	18 reps
All values from Pro Day

After going undrafted in the 2026 NFL draft, Tecza signed with the Pittsburgh Steelers as an undrafted free agent on August 24, 2026. On August 28, he was waived by the Steelers.
