= Comparisons between the NFL and NCAA football =

The National Football League (NFL) and the National Collegiate Athletic Association (NCAA) are respectively the most popular professional and amateur football organizations in the United States. The National Football League was founded in 1920 and has since become the largest and most popular sport in the United States. The NFL has the highest average attendance of any sporting league in the world, with an average attendance of 66,960 people per game during the 2011 NFL season. It is played between the champions of the National Football Conference (NFC) and the American Football Conference (AFC), and its winner is awarded the Vince Lombardi Trophy.

Collegiate football ranks third in overall popularity in the United States, behind baseball and pro football. The NCAA, the largest collegiate organization, is divided into three Divisions: Division I, Division II and Division III. Division I football is further divided into two subdivisions: the Football Bowl Subdivision (FBS) and the Football Championship Subdivision (FCS). The FBS subdivision is divided even further, in effect though not formally, into the Power Five and the Group of five. The champions of Division I-FCS, Division II and Division III are determined through playoff systems, and the Division I-FBS champion was determined through the Bowl Championship Series (BCS). Division I-FBS switched to a four-team playoff system in 2014.

== Major rule differences ==
Major rule differences between NCAA and NFL
Rule	NFL	College football
Number of feet a receiver must have in bounds for a completed pass	Both	Only one
Down by contact rule	Yes, a player is active until he is tackled or forced down by a member of the opposing team	No, a player is automatically ruled down when any part of his body other than the feet or hands touches the ground
Penalty for defensive pass interference	Automatic first down at the spot of the foul	Automatic first down, with the lesser of 15 yards from the previous spot or the spot of the foul
Clock temporarily stops after the offense completes a first down so the chain crew can reset the chains	No	Yes
Defensive Holding	5 yard penalty, automatic first down	10 yard penalty, repeat the down unless 1st down gained by penalty yardage
Spot where an opposing team takes possession after a missed field goal	The greater of the spot of the kick or the opposing team's 20-yard line	The greater of the previous line of scrimmage or opposing team's 20-yard line
Starting point of a one- or two-point conversion	Fifteen-yard line for one-point and two-yard line for two-point	Three-yard line for both
Overtime	Sudden death using basically the same rules as in regulation, except if the team that receives the kickoff scores either a field goal or touchdown on its first possession, it then kicks off to the opposing team with an opportunity to score. If the score is tied again after that possession, true sudden death rules apply. There is no overtime during preseason, and during regular season games, only one overtime period (maximum length of 10 minutes) is played; and the game can simply end in a tie. During playoff games, multiple overtime periods may be held until a winner is determined.	Each team is given one possession from its opponent's twenty-five yard line with no game clock. The team leading after both possessions is declared the winner. If the teams remain tied, overtime periods continue; games cannot end in a tie. Teams that possesses the ball first in each period alternates. Starting with the third overtime, teams are only allowed to attempt two-point conversions after a touchdown.
Instant replay	Scoring plays, turnovers, and plays during the final two minutes of each half and all overtime periods are subject to booth review. Coaches are issued two challenges (with the option for a third if the first two are successful) to request a review for all other plays	All plays are subject to booth reviews. Coaches only have one challenge per game.
Hash marks	18 feet 6 inches apart (the width of the goal posts)	40 feet apart

== Overview ==
The NFL consists of thirty-two clubs divided into two conferences of sixteen teams each. Each conference is divided into four divisions of four clubs each. The NFL season format consists of a four-week preseason, a seventeen-week regular season, and a twelve-team single-elimination playoff culminating in the Super Bowl, the league's championship game. College teams mostly play other similarly sized schools through the NCAA's divisional system. Division I generally consists of the major collegiate athletic powers with larger budgets, more elaborate facilities, and more athletic scholarships. Division II primarily consists of smaller public and private institutions that offer fewer scholarships than those in Division I. Division III institutions also field teams, but do not offer any scholarships. Football teams in Division I are further divided into the Bowl Subdivision (consisting of the largest programs) and the Championship Subdivision. The Bowl Subdivision (FBS) previously did not have an organized tournament to determine its champion; instead, teams competed in post-season bowl games. Up through the 2013 season, the BCS National Championship game determined the national champion. The game featured the #1 and #2 teams in the BCS rankings, a mixture of computer and human polls ranking the top teams in the country. Beginning in the 2014 season, a 4-team playoff now determines the national champion. The four teams competing in the College Football Playoff are decided by a 13-member selection committee using a complex set of selection criteria and each committee member valuing certain selection criteria differently. These criteria include strength of schedule, conference championships, win–loss record, on-field play, non-conference schedule and much more. The importance of traditional major bowl games will be preserved by using 2 of the 6 major bowls as the semi-finals of the playoff while the remaining 4 will incorporate traditional conference "tie-ins" to schedule teams in each bowl game. The Championship Subdivision utilizes a college football playoff, the NCAA Division I Football Championship. As of 2014, 24 teams are selected for the playoff. Similar to the NCAA College Basketball Tournament, each conference champion received an automatic bid to the tournament. The remaining tournament berths are awarded as "at-large" selections by a selection committee.

== Common metro areas ==
NFL markets and nearby NCAA teams
Metro	NFL team	NCAA team	Shared stadium
Atlanta	Atlanta Falcons	Georgia Tech Yellow Jackets, Georgia State	—N/a
Baltimore	Baltimore Ravens	Navy Midshipmen, Maryland Terrapins	—N/a
Boston	New England Patriots	Boston College Eagles, Harvard Crimson, UMass Minutemen	—N/a
Buffalo	Buffalo Bills	Buffalo Bulls	—N/a
Charlotte	Carolina Panthers	Charlotte 49ers	—N/a
Chicago	Chicago Bears	Illinois Fighting Illini, Northwestern Wildcats	—N/a
Cleveland	Cleveland Browns	Akron Zips	—N/a
Cincinnati	Cincinnati Bengals	Cincinnati Bearcats	—N/a
Dallas	Dallas Cowboys	SMU Mustangs, TCU Horned Frogs	—N/a
Denver	Denver Broncos	Colorado Buffaloes	—N/a
Detroit	Detroit Lions	Michigan Wolverines, Michigan State Spartans	—N/a
Green Bay	Green Bay Packers	—N/a	—N/a
Houston	Houston Texans	Houston Cougars, Rice Owls	—N/a
Indianapolis	Indianapolis Colts	Butler Bulldogs	—N/a
Jacksonville	Jacksonville Jaguars	—N/a	—N/a
Kansas City	Kansas City Chiefs	—N/a	—N/a
Las Vegas	Las Vegas Raiders	UNLV Rebels	Allegiant Stadium
Los Angeles	Los Angeles Rams; Los Angeles Chargers	UCLA Bruins; USC Trojans	—N/a
Miami	Miami Dolphins	Miami Hurricanes	Hard Rock Stadium
Minneapolis–Saint Paul	Minnesota Vikings	Minnesota Golden Gophers	—N/a
Nashville	Tennessee Titans	Vanderbilt Commodores	—N/a
New Orleans	New Orleans Saints	Tulane Green Wave	—N/a
New York City	New York Giants; New York Jets	Army Black Knights	—N/a
Philadelphia	Philadelphia Eagles	Temple Owls	Lincoln Financial Field
Phoenix	Arizona Cardinals	Arizona State Sun Devils	—N/a
Pittsburgh	Pittsburgh Steelers	Pittsburgh Panthers	Heinz Field
San Francisco Bay Area	San Francisco 49ers	California Golden Bears; Stanford Cardinal; San Jose State Spartans	—N/a
Seattle	Seattle Seahawks	Washington Huskies	—N/a
Tampa Bay	Tampa Bay Buccaneers	South Florida Bulls	Raymond James Stadium
Washington, D.C.	Washington Commanders	Maryland Terrapins, Georgetown Hoyas	—N/a

=== Chicago ===
In 2002, Soldier Field was closed and rebuilt with only the exterior wall of the stadium being preserved. It was closed on Sunday, January 20, 2002, a day after the Bears lost in the playoffs. It reopened on September 27, 2003 after a complete rebuild (the second in the stadium's history). Many fans refer to the rebuilt stadium as "New Soldier Field". During the 2002 season, the Bears played their home games at the University of Illinois' Memorial Stadium in Champaign, where they went 3–5.

=== Cleveland ===
Cleveland Stadium hosted the annual Notre Dame/Navy college football game 11 times: in 1932, 1934, 1939, 1942, 1943, 1945, 1947, 1950, 1952, 1976 and 1978. The games were well attended, with an average attendance of 69,730 and a high of 84,090 fans for the 1947 game, which was won by Notre Dame 27-0. The only Great Lakes Bowl was held there in 1947. Local colleges Case Institute of Technology and Western Reserve University used the field from time to time as well. The Illinois Fighting Illini played the Penn State Nittany Lions there in 1959. The Ohio State Buckeyes played in the stadium four times. The first was in a 1942 win over Illinois before 68,656, the second a 1943 loss to Purdue, and the third a 1944 victory over Illinois. The final college football contest played there was on October 19, 1991, when the Northwestern Wildcats played a "home" game against the Buckeyes. While Northwestern received the home team's share of the gate receipts, the crowd was mostly Ohio State fans. The Ohio Classic college football game was held at FirstEnergy Stadium in both 2004 and 2005. In September 2006, it hosted the Bowling Green Falcons–Wisconsin Badgers game. In 2007, it began hosting the Patriot Bowl, a season-opening game between Army and Akron. Boston College defeated Kent State in the second Patriot Bowl on August 30, 2008. In 2009, it hosted the Ohio State–Toledo game. On October 14, 2008 CSU President Michael Schwartz stated "he wants a blue ribbon panel to give him a recommendation on the football team before July 1, 2009, when he is scheduled to retire. He also said the program will have to be structured to pay for itself." The Football establishment issue became an official item on the Cleveland State University, Student Government Association election ballot. From Monday April 12 at 12:01 AM until Friday April 14 the student body voted on the issue. By Friday evening, the results indicated that 68.7% of the student population favored establishment of a football team. Furthermore, the student body was asked if they were willing to pay a fee for Division I non-scholarship football in addition to any potential, future tuition increases that may be instituted by the University. The student body responded with 55.6% of the vote being no.

=== Detroit ===
In college sports, Detroit's central location within the Mid-American Conference has made it a frequent site for the league's championship events. The MAC Football Championship Game has been played at Ford Field in Detroit since 2004, and annually attracts 25,000 to 30,000 fans. The NCAA football Little Caesars Pizza Bowl is held at Ford Field each December. Wayne State University competes in Division II in football.

=== Green Bay ===
When built, Lambeau Field was also slated to be used by Green Bay's public high schools, as old City Stadium had been. However, a key 1962 game between the Packers and Detroit Lions was affected when two high schools played in the rain the preceding Friday, damaging the field. After that, Lombardi asked the schools to avoid using Lambeau, however both Southwest High and West High played there until a high school stadium was built in the late 1970s. In 1970, Green Bay's Premontre High School (the alma mater of Lombardi's son, Vince Jr., which has since been merged into Notre Dame Academy) hosted (and won) the state private school football championship. In 1982 and 1983, St. Norbert College hosted Fordham University (Lombardi's alma mater) in benefit games to fight cancer. Shortly after the 2006 Wisconsin–Ohio State hockey game, newspaper reports said the Wisconsin football team might be interested in moving a non-conference road game to Lambeau Field. In 2016, Lambeau Field hosted the Wisconsin Badgers vs. LSU Tigers in the second of a two-game series starting in 2014, where the game was in Houston at Reliant Stadium.

=== Jacksonville ===
College sports, especially college football, are popular in Jacksonville. The city hosts the Florida–Georgia game, an annual college football game between the University of Florida and the University of Georgia, and the TaxSlayer Bowl, a post-season college bowl game. Jacksonville's two universities compete in NCAA Division I: the University of North Florida Ospreys and the Jacksonville University Dolphins, both in the ASUN Conference.

=== Kansas City ===
Arrowhead Stadium serves as the venue for various intercollegiate football games. It has hosted the Big 12 Championship Game five times. On the last weekend in October, the Fall Classic rivalry game between Northwest Missouri State University and Pittsburg State University takes place here. The Bearcats of Northwest and Gorillas of Pitt State are frequently ranked one-two in the MIAA conference. In 2005, other games at Arrowhead included Arkansas State playing host to Missouri, and Kansas hosting Oklahoma.

=== Los Angeles ===
Los Angeles is home to the Los Angeles Rams and Los Angeles Chargers who play out of SoFi Stadium in Inglewood. Between 1994 and 2016 the Los Angeles market had no NFL teams after the Rams who had been in the market since 1946 moved from suburban Anaheim to St. Louis, Missouri, and the Los Angeles Raiders who had been in the market since 1982 returned to Oakland, California after 1994. The Rams returned from St. Louis in 2016 and the Chargers moved from San Diego in 2017 after being founded in Los Angeles as charter member of the AFL in 1960.

Los Angeles had multiple teams in the multiple American Football Leagues, prior to the NFL. The Los Angeles Wildcats, also called "Wilson Wildcats", were a traveling team for the first AFL in 1926. The Los Angeles Bulldogs were members of AFL (1937) and a minor AFL (1939) before joining the Pacific Coast Professional Football League.

The Los Angeles area has hosted the Super Bowl eight times. The Los Angeles Memorial Coliseum hosted Super Bowl I in 1967 and Super Bowl VII in 1973. The Rose Bowl hosted Super Bowl XI in 1977, Super Bowl XIV in 1980, Super Bowl XVII in 1983, Super Bowl XXI in 1987 and Super Bowl XXVII in 1993. SoFi Stadium has hosted Super Bowl LVI in 2022. The city ranks third on the list of having hosted the most number of Super Bowls, after Miami and New Orleans.

The metropolitan area boasts nine NCAA Division I athletic programs. The best-known are the two whose football teams compete in the top-level Football Bowl Subdivision, both of which are in the city of Los Angeles proper:

- UCLA Bruins – Winners of more national team championships than any other college program (105), and 259 individual national championships (364 total national championships).
- USC Trojans – Winners of 91 national team championships, and 357 individual national championships (448 total national championships).

USC has 11 national championships in football and, together with Notre Dame, has more Heisman Trophy winners than any other school.

=== New York City ===
The first college football game played in Yankee Stadium was a 3-0 Syracuse victory over Pittsburgh on October 20, 1923. The Notre Dame–Army game was played at Yankee Stadium from 1925 until 1947. In the 1928 game, with the score 0–0 at halftime, legendary Notre Dame coach Knute Rockne gave his "win one for the Gipper" speech (with reference to All-American halfback George Gipp, who died in 1920); Notre Dame went on to defeat Army, 12–6. The 1929 game between the two teams had the highest attendance in the series at 79,408. The 1946 Army vs. Notre Dame football game at Yankee stadium is regarded as one of the 20th century college football Games of the Century.

New York University played 96 games at Yankee Stadium, more than any other school, using it as a secondary home field from 1923 to 1948. Nearby Fordham University played 19 games there, going 13–5–1. Eight college football games were played at Yankee Stadium on Thanksgiving Day, the first seven by New York University. The Miami-Nebraska game remains the only college bowl ever played at the stadium. In 1969, Notre Dame and Army reprised their long series at the Stadium with one final game. Starting in 1971, the Stadium hosted the Whitney M. Young Urban League Classic, a game between historically black colleges, often featuring Grambling State University, coached by Eddie Robinson, the first college coach to win 400 games. Yankee Stadium hosted its final Classic during the 1987 season, also the last time a football game was played there. Grambling lost to Central State University of Ohio, 37–21.

In 1926, after negotiations failed with the fledgling NFL and the Chicago Bears, Red Grange and his agent C.C. Pyle formed the first American Football League and fielded a team called the New York Yankees based in Yankee Stadium. The league failed after only one year, but the team continued as a member of the NFL for two seasons before ceasing operations. A second New York Yankees football team, not related to the first, split its home games between Yankee Stadium and Downing Stadium as it competed in the second AFL in 1936 and 1937. A third AFL New York Yankees took the field in 1940 and became the New York Americans in 1941. The New York Yankees of the All-America Football Conference (AAFC) played their home games at Yankee Stadium from 1946 to 1949. Following the 1949 season, the NFL New York Bulldogs acquired many of the players from the 1949 Yankees. Using the name the New York Yanks they played two seasons at Yankee Stadium, 1950 and 1951. The New York Giants of the NFL played their home games at Yankee Stadium from 1956 to 1973. On December 28, 1958, Yankee Stadium hosted the NFL championship game.

The Giants played their first two home games at Yankee Stadium in 1973, concluding their tenancy on September 23 with a 23–23 tie against the Philadelphia Eagles. In October, they moved to the Yale Bowl in New Haven, Connecticut, for the rest of the season.

=== Phoenix ===
The Arizona Cardinals moved to Phoenix from St. Louis, Missouri in 1988 and currently play in the Western Division of the National Football League's National Football Conference. The team, however, has never played in the city itself; they played at Sun Devil Stadium on the campus of Arizona State University in nearby Tempe until 2006. Sun Devil Stadium held Super Bowl XXX in 1996 when the Dallas Cowboys defeated the Pittsburgh Steelers. The Cardinals now play at State Farm Stadium in west suburban Glendale. University of Phoenix Stadium hosted Super Bowl XLII on February 3, 2008, in which the New York Giants defeated the New England Patriots. It is also the home of the annual Tostitos Fiesta Bowl, a college football bowl game that is part of the Bowl Championship Series (BCS). The University of Phoenix Stadium hosted Super Bowl XLIX in 2015, in which the Patriots defeated the Seattle Seahawks.

=== San Francisco Bay Area ===
All three football-playing schools in the Bay Area are in the Football Bowl Subdivision, the highest level of NCAA college football. The California Golden Bears and Stanford Cardinal compete in the Pac-12 Conference, and the San Jose State Spartans compete in the Mountain West Conference. The Cardinal and Golden Bears are intense rivals, with their football teams competing annually in the Big Game for the Stanford Axe. One of the most famous games in the rivalry is the 1982 edition, when the Golden Bears defeated the Cardinal on a last-second return kickoff known as "The Play".

=== Saint Louis ===
Saint Louis University (SLU) plays NCAA Division I sports as a member of the Atlantic 10 Conference. SLU dropped football as an intercollegiate sport in 1949, but SLU is best known for its men's basketball and men's soccer programs. The Edward Jones Dome hosted the first Big 12 Conference football championship game in 1996 (Nebraska versus Texas). The third game, in 1998, was also held in the dome (Kansas State versus Texas A&M). The dome has also been a neutral site for regular-season college football matchups between the University of Illinois and the University of Missouri, promoted locally as the "Arch Rivalry". Missouri has won all six games (2002, 2003, 2007, 2008, 2009 & 2010).

=== Washington, DC ===
On December 20, 2008, Washington hosted its first college bowl game, the 2008 EagleBank Bowl, at RFK Stadium. In that game, Wake Forest defeated Navy, 29–19.

After the naming rights deal between the bowl organizers and EagleBank expired following the 2009 EagleBank Bowl, the game was renamed the Military Bowl presented by Northrop Grumman, with a new sponsor.
