= Shaun Nua =

American football player and coach (born 1981)

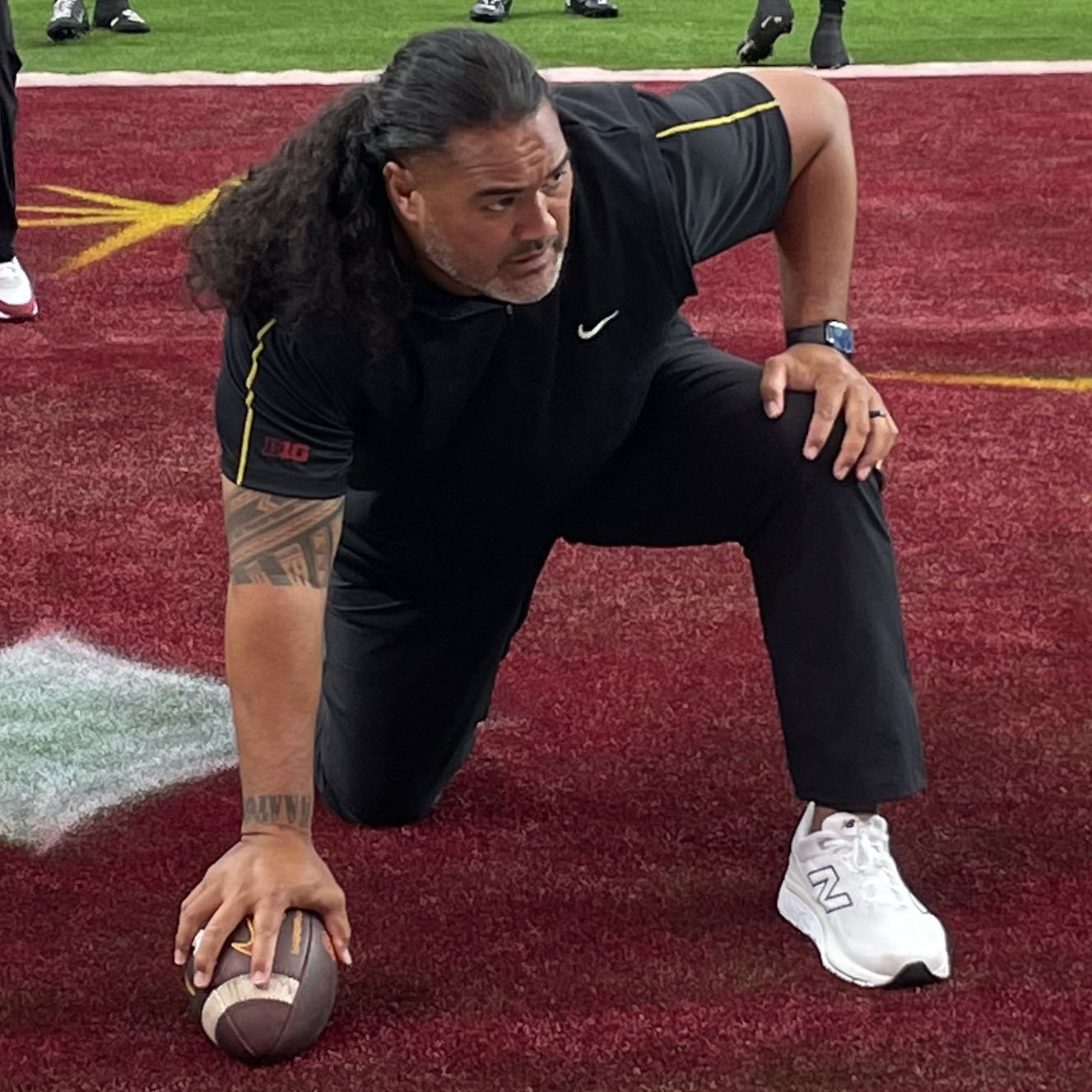
- Nua leading warm-ups ahead of the 2024 Vegas Kickoff Classic

USC Trojans
- Title: Defensive line coach

Personal information
- Born: May 22, 1981 (age 45); Pago Pago, American Samoa
- Listed height: 6 ft 5 in (1.96 m)
- Listed weight: 280 lb (127 kg)

Career information
- High school: Tafuna (Tafuna, American Samoa)
- College: BYU
- NFL draft: 2005: 7th round, 228th overall pick

Career history

Playing
- Pittsburgh Steelers (2005–2007); Buffalo Bills (2007–2008)*
- * Offseason or practice squad member only

Coaching
- BYU (2009) Intern; BYU (2010–2011) Graduate assistant; Navy (2012–2017) Defensive line coach; Arizona State (2018) Defensive line coach; Michigan (2019–2021) Defensive line coach; USC (2022–2023) Defensive line coach; USC (2023) Interim co-defensive coordinator & defensive line coach; USC (2024–present) defensive line coach

Awards and highlights
- As player: Super Bowl champion (XL); Second-team All-MW (2004); As assistant coach: Armed Forces Bowl champion (2013); Poinsettia Bowl champion (2014); 2× Military Bowl champion (2015, 2017)

Shaun C. Nua (born May 22, 1981) is an American Samoan former professional football defensive end and current football coach. He played college football at Brigham Young University and was selected by the Pittsburgh Steelers in the seventh round of the 2005 NFL draft. Nua is currently the defensive line coach for the USC Trojans football team.

== Early life ==
Nua was born in Pago Pago, the capital city of American Samoa – an unincorporated territory of the United States located in the South Pacific Ocean. He was the second oldest of six children born to Sao and Usu Nua, a farmer and nurse, respectively.

Nua attended Tafuna High School in Tafuna, American Samoa. As a senior, he earned All-League honors as a defensive end, however he suffered a torn ACL. Nua moved to the Hawaiian island of Oahu to live with an aunt for six months while recovering from his knee injury. From there, he moved to Phoenix, Arizona to live with his sister, who was an undergraduate student at Arizona State University.

== College career ==
Nua first attended Eastern Arizona College, a junior college in Graham County, Arizona. Eastern Arizona assistant football coach and BYU alum (and current BYU head football coach) Kalani Sitake was instrumental in steering Nua towards a Division 1 scholarship at BYU.

Nua redshirted in 2003 before returning in the 2004 season and earning second-team All-Mountain West Conference honors as a senior. He ultimately appeared in 22 games, posting 54 tackles (30 solo, 24 assist) and 10 sacks in his career at BYU. Nua graduated from BYU in 2005 with a bachelor's degree in youth and family recreation, and later earned his master's degree from BYU in recreation management in 2013.

== Professional career ==
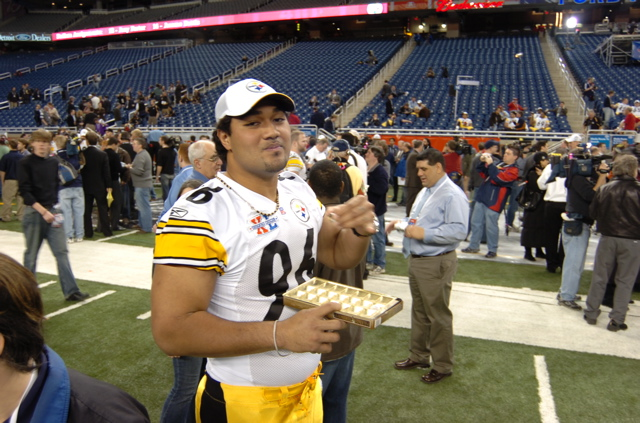
Nua with the Pittsburgh Steelers on Super Bowl XL media day

Nua was selected by the Pittsburgh Steelers in the seventh round of the 2005 NFL draft. He would spend the next three seasons on the Steelers offseason roster and practice squad, earning a Super Bowl ring with the Steelers championship in 2006. In 2008, Nua was signed to a future/reserve contract with the Buffalo Bills, however he was released before the season.

== Coaching career ==
Following his stint in the NFL, Nua returned to his alma mater as a defensive graduate assistant on the staff of BYU head coach Bronco Mendenhall from 2009 to 2011. Nua helped the Cougars achieve the nation's 24th-best total defense in 2010 and the 13th-ranked defense in 2011. BYU won its bowl games both years while finishing the 2011 season ranked No. 25 in the final USA Today Coaches Poll with a 10–3 record.

On January 26, 2012, Nua joined the coaching staff of Ken Niumatalolo at Navy as defensive line coach.

On January 7, 2018, Nua joined the coaching staff of Herm Edwards at Arizona State as defensive line coach.

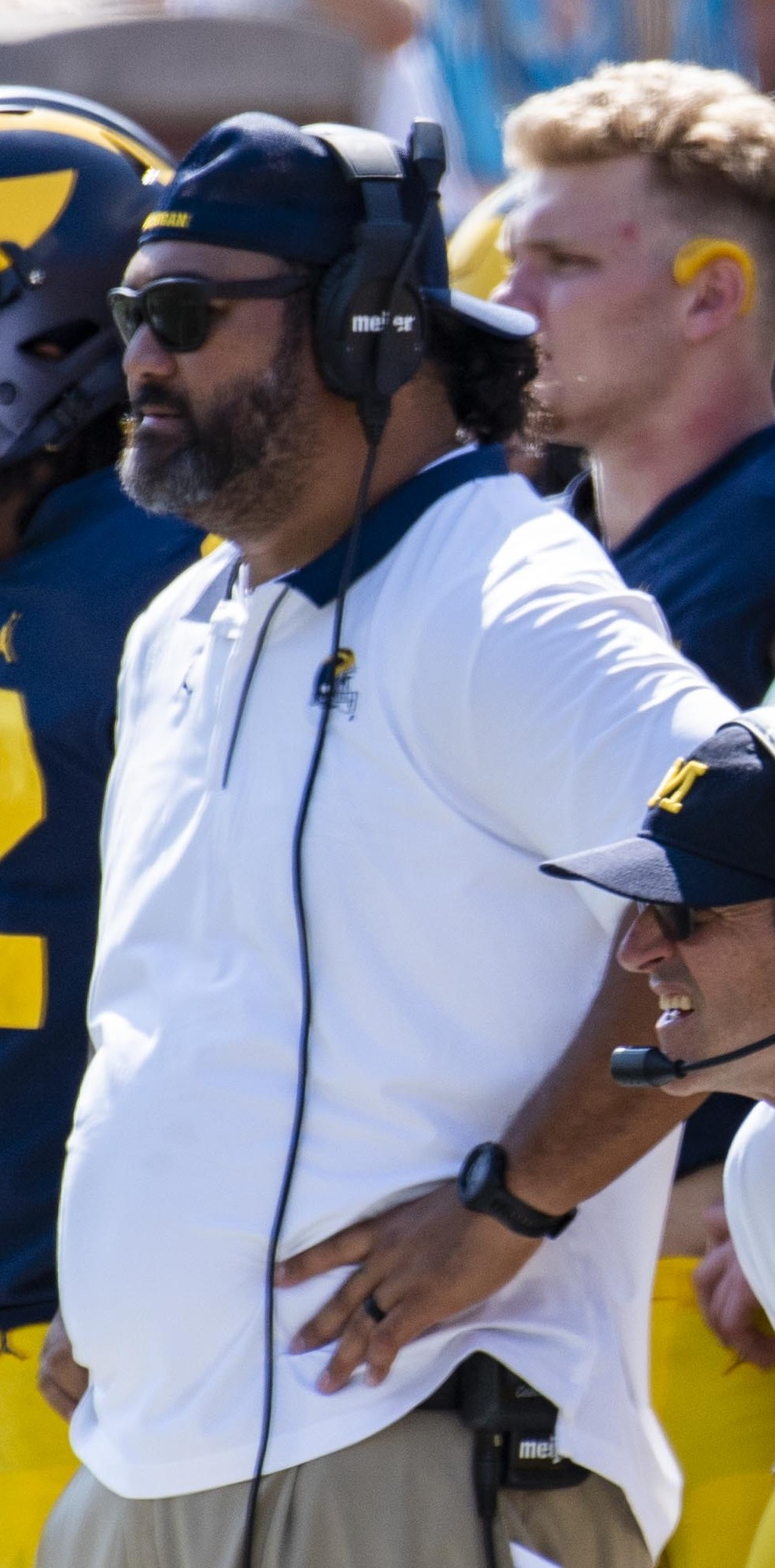
Nua with Michigan in 2021

On January 17, 2019, Nua joined the coaching staff of Jim Harbaugh at Michigan as defensive line coach. Nua signed a two-year employment agreement that pays him an annual salary of $400,000.

== Personal ==
Nua and his wife Hilary have three children: Losi, Kelina, and Malia.

Nua is cousin to BYU Softball All-American and Hall of Famer Ianeta Le'i, and BYU Volleyball All-American and National Team member Futi Tavana.
