= List of college football post-season games that were rematches of regular season games =

Program of the 1957 Rose Bowl, a rematch of a regular-season game

This is a list of NCAA Division I Football Bowl Subdivision (FBS) college football post-season games that were rematches of regular-season games. (Note: In one instance, the first of the two meetings between teams came in a conference championship contest.)

== Background ==
At the highest level of college football, post-season rematches between teams that met during the regular season have been uncommon occurrences. For many decades, there were few opportunities for teams to meet both in a regular-season game and later in a post-season contest, given the lack of any playoff and the limited number of bowl games. The earliest known occurrence was during the 1943 college football season, when Texas A&M and LSU played once during the regular season and again in the 1944 Orange Bowl. With an increasing number of bowl games since the 1990s and the establishment of the College Football Playoff (CFP) in 2014, the number of postseason contests has grown substantially. With the expansion of the CFP from four to 12 teams in 2024, additional opportunities for rematches have been created.

Note that this list considers conference championship games to be regular-season contests, not post-season contests. There have been various instances of teams playing during the regular season and again in a conference championship game; examples include the 1999 SEC Championship Game between Alabama and Florida, and the 2025 Mountain West Conference Football Championship Game between Boise State and UNLV. Such rematches are not included in the below list. Also not included are instances when teams played each other more than once during the regular season, typically something that only happened in the late 19th century or early 20th century. (Note: During the 2025 Pac-12 Conference football season, the conference's only members, Oregon State and Washington State, played twice during the regular season.)

The most recently played post-season game that was a rematch of a regular-season contest was the 2026 Peach Bowl between Indiana and Oregon. It was the 31st such occurrence. In only 10 instances has the team that won the regular-season contest also won the post-season game. Nineteen times, the team that lost the regular-season contest won the rematch. Two rematches featured teams that tied during the regular season, played before the NCAA instituted overtime.

In contrast to the losing record that teams winning the regular-season contest have in post-season rematches, teams winning in the regular season have a winning record of 36–31 in conference championship game rematches.

Given that various teams have met during the regular season and again in their conference's championship game, along with the noted expansion of the CFP, in which teams from the same conference have met during the playoff (such as the 2025 Rose Bowl and 2026 Peach Bowl) two teams could potentially meet three times in one season: once in a regular-season contest, again in their conference's championship game, and yet again during the post-season playoff.

== List ==
Key
	Game ended in a tie
	Same team won both games
	Conference championship game
	College Football Playoff contest
(H)	Home team
(A)	Away team
(N)	Neutral site game

Most, but not all, post-season games are played at a neutral site. Some regular-season games are also played at a neutral site.

No.	Rematch game	Results		Notes
No.	Rematch game	Regular season	Postseason	Notes
1	1944 Orange Bowl	(A) Texas A&M 28 (H) LSU 13	(N) LSU 19 (N) Texas A&M 14	On October 9, 1943, Texas A&M defeated LSU at Baton Rouge by a score of 28–13. The two teams were selected to play in the Orange Bowl on January 1, after each finished second in their respective conferences. In the rematch, Tigers' halfback Steve Van Buren was responsible for all of their points, and LSU won by a score of 19–14.
2	1946 Gator Bowl	(N) Wake Forest 13 (N) South Carolina 13 (Note: Wake Forest and South Carolina played their regular-season game at a neutral site in Charlotte, North Carolina.)	(N) Wake Forest 26 (N) South Carolina 14	Wake Forest and South Carolina tied, 13–13, on November 22, 1945, in Charlotte, North Carolina. Neither team had played in a bowl game before and were invited to face each other again in the first Gator Bowl. Wake Forest edged past the Gamecocks, 28–14, before a sparse crowd of 7,362.
3	1957 Rose Bowl	(H) Iowa 14 (A) Oregon State 13	(N) Iowa 35 (N) Oregon State 19	Iowa hosted Oregon State on October 6, 1956, coming away with a 14–13 victory. After the Beavers won the Pacific Coast Conference and the Hawkeyes became champions of the Big Ten Conference, both earned a spot in the Rose Bowl. Both teams were productive offensively, but Iowa produced more points and won 35–19.
4	1960 Sugar Bowl	(H) LSU 7 (A) Ole Miss 3	(N) Ole Miss 21 (N) LSU 0	On October 31, 1959, defending national champion LSU scored in the 4th quarter on an 89-yard punt return by eventual Heisman Trophy winner Billy Cannon to beat visiting Ole Miss, 7–3, one of only three scores that the Rebel defense gave up all season. After getting past Ole Miss, LSU lost by one point to Tennessee. With SEC champion Georgia, who had faced neither Ole Miss nor LSU, selected to play in the Orange Bowl, the Sugar Bowl chose to have the home-state Tigers, ranked #3 nationally, face a rematch against #2 Ole Miss. The Rebels outgained LSU 373-74 and won 21–0. This was a rare example of a postseason game featuring a rematch of conference foes; oddly, LSU appeared in another such game in the same city in 2012, and lost by the same score.
5	1966 Rose Bowl	(H) Michigan State 13 (A) UCLA 3	(N) UCLA 14 (N) Michigan State 12	Michigan State won their season opener at Spartan Stadium over UCLA 13–3. The Spartans remained undefeated through the regular season, capturing the Big Ten Conference title. Unheralded UCLA surprised many by becoming the Athletic Association of Western Universities champion, earning a rematch with Michigan State in the Rose Bowl. Future Heisman winner Gary Beban led the Bruins to a 14–0 halftime lead, which held up as Michigan State scored twice in the 4th quarter but on both occasions attempted and failed two-point conversions.
6	1976 Rose Bowl	(A) Ohio State 41 (H) UCLA 20	(N) UCLA 23 (N) Ohio State 10	Ohio State, led by two-time Heisman winner Archie Griffin, defeated UCLA at the Los Angeles Memorial Coliseum by an impressive score of 41–20 on October 4. Buckeyes coach Woody Hayes prophetically told his team that they would see the Bruins again. Going undefeated through the regular season, the Big Ten champion Buckeyes were ranked #1 and favored to win the Rose Bowl and the national championship, with Pacific 8 champ UCLA the only obstacle remaining. The Bruins had been the only team to score more than 14 on Ohio State in the regular season and managed to do so again on New Years Day. After holding Ohio State to a field goal in the first half, UCLA scored four times to the Buckeyes' one score in the second half to defeat them 23–10. The upset allowed the Oklahoma Sooners to claim the national championship.
7	1979 Orange Bowl	(H) Nebraska 17 (A) Oklahoma 14	(N) Oklahoma 31 (N) Nebraska 24	Oklahoma and Nebraska were both undefeated in conference play going into their showdown in Lincoln, Nebraska, on November 11. With the Huskers up 17–14 in the 4th quarter, the Sooners were in scoring position when Billy Sims fumbled on the Nebraska 3 yard line with 3:27 remaining. The Cornhuskers recovered the ball and subsequently notched their first victory over Oklahoma since the 1971 Game of the Century. The Orange Bowl had been seeking to set up Penn State against Nebraska for the national championship, but the Huskers lost the next week to Missouri and the Nittany Lions went to the Sugar Bowl where they lost to Alabama. With Notre Dame headed to the Cotton Bowl, the only top team left to face the Big Eight champion Cornhuskers was Oklahoma. The Sooners had a 14–0 lead at halftime, and in the third quarter, they opened up their lead to 31–10. Nebraska scored twice in the fourth quarter, but it was not enough to overcome Oklahoma, as they won with a final score of 31–24.
8	1983 Rose Bowl	(A) UCLA 31 (H) Michigan 27	(N) UCLA 24 (Note: While considered a neutral-site game, the 1983 Rose Bowl was contested at the Rose Bowl, UCLA's home stadium.) (N) Michigan 14	Michigan was 1–1 when they hosted UCLA on September 25 and afterward was 1–2 as UCLA came back from a 21-point deficit to win 31–27. The Bruins went on to win the Pac-10 and a berth in the Rose Bowl. Michigan recovered from their slow start to capture the Big Ten championship. In addition to their regular season meeting earlier in the year, the two teams had faced each other 366 days earlier on New Year's Eve in the 1981 Astro-Bluebonnet Bowl where the Wolverines had triumphed 33–14. In their third meeting in a years' time, the Bruins took the rubber match over Michigan by a score of 24–14.
9	1988 Rose Bowl	(H) Michigan State 27 (A) USC 13	(N) Michigan State 20 (N) USC 17	Michigan State put up a 27–13 victory on USC to open the season at Spartan Stadium. Despite suffering two losses after beating USC, the Spartans righted the ship and went undefeated in Big Ten play, winning the conference championship. The Trojans also picked up two more losses but salvaged their season with a Pac-10 title and a Rose Bowl berth. Despite three turnovers, USC had the game tied in the fourth quarter. Michigan State kicked a field goal to take the lead in and on the ensuing Trojan drive, Rodney Peete fumbled a snap at the Spartan 29-yard line with just two minutes remaining. After recovering the ball and running out the clock, the Spartans claimed a 20–17 victory.
10	1994 Las Vegas Bowl	(H) Central Michigan 35 (A) UNLV 23	(N) UNLV 52 (Note: While considered a neutral-site game, the 1994 Las Vegas Bowl was contested at Sam Boyd Stadium, UNLV's home stadium.) (N) Central Michigan 24	UNLV visited Mount Pleasant, Michigan, on September 10, where they lost to the Chippewas of Central Michigan, 35–23. Central Michigan compiled an 8–1 conference record en route to a Mid-American Conference championship and a bid to the Las Vegas Bowl. UNLV stumbled to a 6–5 finish but was good enough to win part of the Big West Conference title and a spot in their hometown bowl game. The Chippewas turned the ball over four times and never kept the game close, as the Rebels ran away with a 52–24 win.
11	1995 Sugar Bowl (January)	(H) Florida State 31 (A) Florida 31	(N) Florida State 23 (N) Florida 17	On November 26, the visiting Florida Gators left Tallahassee with a 31–31 tie with in-state rival Florida State, which was the last tie in program history for both teams, as the NCAA subsequently mandated the use of overtime. FSU had already secured the ACC championship, while Florida defeated Alabama to claim the SEC title. Taking a 13-point lead into the fourth quarter of the Sugar Bowl, the Seminoles gave up a touchdown with 3:47 left to play. Florida regained possession of the ball with 2:27 left, but an interception sealed the Gators' fate and the Seminoles were victorious, 23–17.
12	1995 Las Vegas Bowl	(A) Toledo 49 (H) Nevada 35	(N) Toledo 40 (N) Nevada 37	The Toledo Rockets roared into the Las Vegas Bowl without a loss, their only blemish being a tie with Miami (OH). Among their nine wins was a week 3 victory in Reno over eventual Big West Conference champion Nevada by a score of 49–35. The two schools met again at Sam Boyd Stadium on December 14. Toledo took an early lead but Nevada stayed in pursuit, finally catching in the fourth quarter with a field goal to tie the score at 34 all and forcing the first overtime game in Division I-A football. The Wolfpack received the ball first and kicked a field goal, giving them their only lead of the game. With their possession, the Rockets scored a touchdown to get the win and complete an undefeated season.
13	1997 Sugar Bowl	(H) Florida State 24 (A) Florida 21	(N) Florida 52 (N) Florida State 20	Much like two years earlier, Florida and Florida State faced each other in the final regular season game of the year with FSU already capturing the ACC championship and Florida heading to a showdown with Alabama for the SEC title. This time, though, the two teams were undefeated and ranked #1 and #2 in the nation. The Seminoles took the first quarter 17–0, while the Gators struck back in the second quarter to end the half behind only 3. After holding each other scoreless in the third, each squad scored a touchdown in the fourth quarter. Florida scored last with little time remaining and had little option but to try an onside kick which careened out of bounds. The Seminoles took home a 24–21 win. After the Gators won against Alabama, the Bowl Alliance pitted the two highest ranked available teams against each other in the Sugar Bowl. With #2 Arizona State contractually obligated to play in the Rose Bowl, #1 Florida State found itself with a rematch against #3 Florida. The Gators never let up, scoring in double digits in every quarter to win 52–20 and, with ASU's loss in the 1997 Rose Bowl, claim their first national championship.
14	1997 Independence Bowl	(A) Notre Dame 24 (H) LSU 6	(N) LSU 27 (N) Notre Dame 9	A 4–5 Notre Dame squad rolled into Death Valley on November 15 to take on #11 LSU. The Irish had no penalties, committed no turnovers, and kept the Tigers to minimal big plays en route to a redemptive 24–6 win. The two schools met again on December 28 in Shreveport, Louisiana. Notre Dame took a 6–3 lead into halftime, but the second half was all LSU, with the Tigers taking revenge with a final score of 27–9.
15	2004 Gator Bowl	(H) Maryland 34 (A) West Virginia 7	(N) Maryland 41 (N) West Virginia 7	West Virginia was ranked #23 when they visited Maryland on September 20. The Terps were 1–2, with only a win over The Citadel, but they were well prepared for the Mountaineers, soundly defeating them 34–7. Finishing the regular season at 9–3, Maryland earned a trip to the Gator Bowl, where they would again go up against West Virginia, co-champs of the Big East and oddly enough again ranked #23 in the country. The second game's outcome was similar to the first, as the Mountaineers could only muster one touchdown and the Terrapins captured a 41–7 victory.
16	2004 Orange Bowl	(A) Miami (FL) 22 (H) Florida State 14	(N) Miami (FL) 16 (N) Florida State 14	On October 11, the #2 Miami Hurricanes went to Doak Campbell Stadium and defeated #5 Florida State 22–14. The 'Canes appeared to be on their way to another BCS National Championship appearance until losing twice, first to Virginia Tech and then to Tennessee. They still captured a Big East title and received an invite to the Orange Bowl to face the ACC champion, Florida State. The Seminoles got out to a 14–3 lead, but Miami fought back, scoring ten points in the second quarter. At halftime, Miami was down by one point. On their opening possession of the second half, the Hurricanes improved on good field position just enough to be able to kick a 51-yard field goal. The rest of the game was a defensive struggle, as no more scoring took place. Miami squeaked by with a 16–14 victory. FSU went to Little Havana to open the 2004 season by facing the 'Canes for the third time in 13 months. In another close, hard-fought contest, Miami won again with a final score of 16–10.
17	2007 Motor City Bowl	(H) Purdue 45 (A) Central Michigan 22	(N) Purdue 51 (N) Central Michigan 48	Purdue hosted the Chippewas from Central Michigan on September 15, shutting out the visitors in the first half and posting a 45–22 win. Central Michigan had five losses in the regular season but only one was in conference and they defeated Miami of Ohio convincingly in the MAC Championship, earning themselves a spot in the Motor City Bowl to once again face the Boilermakers. Just as in the first game, Purdue opened up a big first-half lead, but Central Michigan responded by scoring 28 points in the third quarter to tie the game. Both teams added another touchdown in the fourth quarter and Purdue hit a field goal as time expired to win 51–48.
18	2007 Las Vegas Bowl	(H) UCLA 27 (A) BYU 17	(N) BYU 17 (N) UCLA 16	In the second game of the season for both schools, BYU took a trip to the Rose Bowl where they lost 27–17 to #14 UCLA. The Bruins' season was marred by injuries to their starting and backup quarterbacks along with six losses to go with their six wins. They entered the Las Vegas Bowl at .500 to face the Cougars who had rebounded from their two early losses to win the Mountain West Conference. UCLA went in at halftime down 17–13, but the defenses took over in the second half. The Bruins scored on a 50-yard field goal in the 4th quarter to get within one point, and at the end of the game, UCLA attempted a field goal to give them the win. BYU managed to block the kick, allowing the Cougars to escape with a 17–16 victory.
19	2008 EagleBank Bowl	(A) Navy 24 (H) Wake Forest 17	(N) Wake Forest 29 (N) Navy 19	With a 2–2 record, Navy surprised #15 Wake Forest at BB&T Field with a 24–17 upset. That was the first of five losses for the Deacons, but their seven wins were enough to earn an invitation to the EagleBank Bowl, later renamed the Military Bowl. Their opponent was 8-4 Navy. The Midshipmen opened up a 13–0 lead, but Wake Forest scored four touchdowns (and a two-point conversion) to get revenge, winning 29–19.
20	2008 Armed Forces Bowl	(N) Air Force 31 (N) Houston 28 (Note: Air Force and Houston played their regular-season game at a neutral site in Dallas, Texas.)	(N) Houston 34 (N) Air Force 28	Because of Hurricane Ike, the Houston Cougars traveled to Dallas to play Air Force on September 13. A late charge by the Cougars wasn't enough and Air Force won 31–28. After posting a 7–5 record in the regular season, Houston was chosen for the Armed Forces Bowl. With Navy participating in the EagleBank Bowl and Army ineligible, Houston's opponent was the Air Force Falcons. The Cougars couldn't pull away and twice Air Force was able to even up the score, but the Falcons could never capture a lead and Houston won, 34–28.
21	2010 Holiday Bowl	(A) Nebraska 56 (H) Washington 21	(N) Washington 19 (N) Nebraska 7	Nebraska's first road game of the year was at Husky Stadium to face a 1–1 Washington Huskies squad that had gone 5–7 the year after a winless 0–12 season in 2008. The Cornhuskers dominated the entire game, winning 56–21. Nebraska went on to finish out the regular season at 10–3 with a loss to Oklahoma in the Big 12 Championship, earning a trip to the Holiday Bowl for the second year in a row. Washington had improved from the previous year, but only to 6–6 which was still good enough to earn a bowl bid to face the Cornhuskers again. This time, the Huskies defense shut down the Cornhuskers' offense, allowing far less points than in the earlier regular–season matchup. In the end, Washington earned an upset victory, 19–7. This was Steve Sarkisian's first bowl appearance and win as a head coach.
22	2012 BCS National Championship Game	(A) LSU 9 (H) Alabama 6	(N) Alabama 21 (N) LSU 0	In a game where the scoring consisted of nothing but field goals, LSU defeated Alabama, 9–6, in overtime on November 5 in Tuscaloosa. After Stanford and Boise St fell from the ranks of the undefeated on November 12 and Oklahoma State lost for the first time on November 18, the Crimson Tide found themselves in position to return to the national championship game despite not even winning their division, let alone their conference. LSU found itself facing Alabama in the Mercedes-Benz Superdome on January 9. The second game was not unlike the first in that the first five scores were all field goals, but this time they were not split between the two teams as the Tigers ended with no points. The Tide added a touchdown in the fourth quarter but missed the extra point for a final of 21–0.
23	2012 Liberty Bowl	(H) Iowa State 38 (A) Tulsa 23	(N) Tulsa 31 (N) Iowa State 17	Iowa State opened its season with a 38–23 victory over the Tulsa Golden Hurricane. Tulsa would reel off ten wins after that and claim the Conference USA championship, while the Cyclones would struggle through their Big 12 schedule and barely get to six wins for bowl eligibility. The two teams would meet again at Liberty Bowl Memorial Stadium in Memphis on New Year's Eve after the Liberty Bowl and Louisiana Tech couldn't agree on terms for the Bulldogs to appear. Iowa State twice held leads of ten points in the first quarter, first after a pick-six and then after a 69-yard pass for a touchdown, but after that they would not score again and Tulsa would go on to a 31–17 victory.
24	2016 Heart of Dallas Bowl	(A) North Texas 35 (H) Army 18	(N) Army 38 (N) North Texas 31	On October 22, the Black Knights of Army lost at home to North Texas by a score of 35–18. The Mean Green were chosen to participate in the Heart of Dallas Bowl despite their 5–7 record on the basis of their Academic Progress Rating when there were not enough bowl-eligible teams to fill all the games. Army accepted an invitation to appear in the game after defeating Morgan State for their sixth win but before defeating rival Navy. The cadets jumped out to a 24–7 lead, but North Texas fought back, finally forcing overtime where Army scored a touchdown and then shut down the Mean Green offense to seal the victory.
25	2022 College Football Playoff National Championship	(N) Alabama 41 (N) Georgia 24	(N) Georgia 33 (N) Alabama 18	On December 4, 2021, the Alabama Crimson Tide defeated the Georgia Bulldogs by a score of 41–24 at Mercedes-Benz Stadium in Atlanta in the 2021 SEC Championship Game. The two teams met again on January 10, 2022, to compete for the College Football Playoff National Championship, where the Crimson Tide lost to the Bulldogs, 33–18, at Lucas Oil Stadium in Indianapolis.
26	2025 Rose Bowl	(H) Oregon 32 (A) Ohio State 31	(N) Ohio State 41 (N) Oregon 21	On October 12, 2024, the Oregon Ducks defeated the Ohio State Buckeyes, 32–31, in Eugene, Oregon. The teams met again in the College Football Playoff quarterfinals in the Rose Bowl on January 1, 2025, with Ohio State defeating Oregon, 41–21.
27	2025–26 College Football Playoff (first round)	(A) Oklahoma 23 (H) Alabama 21	(A) Alabama 34 (H) Oklahoma 24	Oklahoma defeated host Alabama, 23–21, on November 15, when the teams were ranked 11th and 4th, respectively. Both teams were selected to the CFP playoff, and scheduled to meet in the first round. Alabama (ranked 9th) won the rematch, hosted by Oklahoma (ranked 8th), 34–24.
28	2025–26 College Football Playoff (first round)	(H) Ole Miss 45 (A) Tulane 10	(H) Ole Miss 41 (A) Tulane 10	Ole Miss hosted and defeated Tulane, 45–10, on September 20, when Ole Miss was ranked 13th and Tulane was unranked. Both teams were selected to the CFP playoff, and scheduled to meet in the first round. Ole Miss (seeded 6th) also hosted and won the rematch, besting Tulane (seeded 11th) by a 41–10 score.
29	2025 Birmingham Bowl	(A) Georgia Southern 25 (H) Appalachian State 23	(N) Georgia Southern 29 (N) Appalachian State 10	In a regular-season game on November 6, 2025, Georgia Southern beat Appalachian State, 25–23, in a Sun Belt Conference contest. Due to a shortage of teams available from conferences with tie-ins to the Birmingham Bowl, Georgia Southern and Appalachian State were selected for a late-December rematch which resulted in a 29–10 win for Georgia Southern.
30	2026 Sugar Bowl	(H) Georgia 43 (A) Ole Miss 35	(N) Ole Miss 39 (N) Georgia 34	In a regular-season game on October 18, 2025, Georgia hosted and beat Ole Miss, 43–35, in an SEC contest. In the 2025–26 College Football Playoff, Georgia received a first-round bye and a berth in a quarterfinal game, the Sugar Bowl. Ole Miss defeated Tulane in a first-round game (also a rematch of a regular-season contest) and advanced to the Sugar Bowl. In the Sugar Bowl, Ole Miss won the rematch, 39–34.
31	2026 Peach Bowl	(A) Indiana 30 (H) Oregon 20	(N) Indiana 56 (N) Oregon 22	In a regular-season game on October 11, 2025, Oregon hosted and lost to Indiana, 30–20, in a Big Ten contest. In the 2025–26 College Football Playoff, fifth-seed Oregon defeated James Madison and Texas Tech to advance to the Peach Bowl semifinal, while first-seed Indiana defeated Alabama to also advance. Indiana won the rematch, 56–22.

== Rematches by teams ==
This section lists the aggregate win–loss records for teams in their post-season rematches.

Updated through the 2026 Peach Bowl (31 games, 62 total appearances).

Teams with multiple appearances

Team	Appearances	Record
UCLA	4	3–1
LSU	4	2–2
Ole Miss	3	3–0
Florida State	3	2–1
Alabama	3	2–1
Wake Forest	2	2–0
Florida	2	1–1
Michigan State	2	1–1
Ohio State	2	1–1
Oklahoma	2	1–1
Georgia	2	1–1
Oregon	2	0–2
Central Michigan	2	0–2
Nebraska	2	0–2

Teams with a single appearance

Won (12): Army, BYU, Georgia Southern, Houston, Indiana, Iowa, Miami (FL), Purdue, Toledo, Tulsa, UNLV, Washington
Lost (15): Air Force, Appalachian State, Iowa State, Maryland, Michigan, Navy, Nevada, North Texas, Notre Dame, Oregon State, South Carolina, Texas A&M, Tulane, USC, West Virginia

== Rematches by games ==
This section lists the total number of times a post-season game has hosted a rematch.

Updated through the 2026 Peach Bowl (31 games).

Games hosting multiple rematches

Post-season game	Rematches
Rose Bowl	6
Sugar Bowl	4
Las Vegas Bowl	3
Orange Bowl	3
College Football Playoff first-round	2
Gator Bowl	2

Games hosting a single rematch (11)

- Armed Forces Bowl
- BCS National Championship Game (Note: Defunct)
- Birmingham Bowl
- College Football Playoff National Championship
- EagleBank Bowl (Note: Now known as the Military Bowl)
- Heart of Dallas Bowl (Note: Now known as the First Responder Bowl)
- Holiday Bowl
- Independence Bowl
- Liberty Bowl
- Motor City Bowl (Note: Later known as the Little Caesars Pizza Bowl; defunct)
- Peach Bowl
