= 2015 Military Bowl =

2015 Military Bowl presented by Northrop Grumman
- 8th Military Bowl
Pittsburgh Panthers	Navy Midshipmen
(8–4)	(10–2)
ACC	The American
28	44
Head coach: Pat Narduzzi	Head coach: Ken Niumatalolo
	AP / Coaches / CFP; 21 / 22 / 21
	1	2	3	4	Total
Pittsburgh	7	0	14	7	28
Navy	14	7	10	13	44
- Date: December 28, 2015
- Season: 2015
- Stadium: Navy–Marine Corps Memorial Stadium
- Location: Annapolis, Maryland
- Favorite: Navy by 4
- National anthem: Betty Cantrell
- Referee: Joe Pester (C-USA)
- Attendance: 36,352
- Payout: US$TBD

United States TV coverage
- Network: ESPN/ESPN Radio
- Announcers: Beth Mowins, Rocky Boiman, & Jane Slater (ESPN); Mike Greenberg, Mike Golic, & Mike Golic, Jr. (ESPN Radio)

The 2015 Military Bowl was a post-season American college football bowl game played on December 28, 2015 at Navy–Marine Corps Memorial Stadium in Annapolis, Maryland. The eighth edition of the Military Bowl featured the Pittsburgh Panthers of the Atlantic Coast Conference against the hometown Navy Midshipmen of the American Athletic Conference. It began at 2:30 p.m. EST and aired on ESPN. It was one of the 2015–16 bowl games that concluded the 2015 FBS football season. Sponsored by aerospace and defense technology company Northrop Grumman, it was officially known as the Military Bowl presented by Northrop Grumman.

== Teams ==
The game featured the Pittsburgh Panthers against the Navy Midshipmen.

=== Navy Midshipmen ===
On September 14, 2015, it was announced that Navy would play in the Military Bowl should they be bowl-eligible and not selected for one of the New Year's Six bowl games. After compiling a 9–2 record in their regular season and losing to Houston in their American Athletic Conference finale, the Midshipmen automatically qualified for the game.

This will be the Midshipmen's second Military Bowl, after the inaugural 2008 game (when it was known as the EagleBank Bowl) where they lost to Wake Forest by a score of 29–19.

=== Pittsburgh Panthers ===
The Panthers are heading to their eighth straight bowl game, the longest such streak in school history. First-year head coach Pat Narduzzi led the Panthers to an 8–4 record and a 2nd-place finish in the ACC Coastal division. Pittsburgh is 13–18 all-time in bowl games.

== Game summary ==
=== Scoring summary ===
Scoring summary

Quarter	Time	Drive			Team	Scoring information	Score	
Quarter	Time	Plays	Yards	TOP	Team	Scoring information	PITT	NAVY
1	14:46				PITT	Quadree Henderson 100-yard kickoff return for a touchdown, Chris Blewitt kick good	7	0
1	9:26	10	75	5:20	NAVY	Kennan Reynolds 1-yard touchdown run, Austin Grebe kick good	7	7
1	0:41	14	86	6:47	NAVY	Keenan Reynolds 5-yard touchdown run, Austin Grebe kick good	7	14
2	1:41	12	84	4:23	NAVY	Tyler Carmona 11-yard touchdown reception from Keenan Reynolds, Austin Grebe kick good	7	21
3	12:28	5	75	2:32	NAVY	Demond Brown 26-yard touchdown run, Austin Grebe kick good	7	28
3	8:11	6	59	2:42	NAVY	35-yard field goal by Austin Grebe	7	31
3	3:14	10	85	4:57	PITT	Qadree Ollison 4-yard touchdown reception from Nathan Peterman, Chris Blewitt kick good	14	31
3	2:57				PITT	Jordan Whitehead fumble recovery returned 22 yards for a touchdown, Chris Blewitt kick good	21	31
4	10:58	14	68	6:59	NAVY	Toneo Gulley 15-yard touchdown run, Austin Grebe kick good	21	38
4	9:35	4	73	1:23	PITT	Qadree Ollison 45-yard touchdown run, Chris Blewitt kick good	28	38
4	4:19	9	75	5:16	NAVY	Keenan Reynolds 9-yard touchdown run, Austin Grebe kick blocked	28	44
"TOP" = time of possession. For other American football terms, see Glossary of American football.							28	44

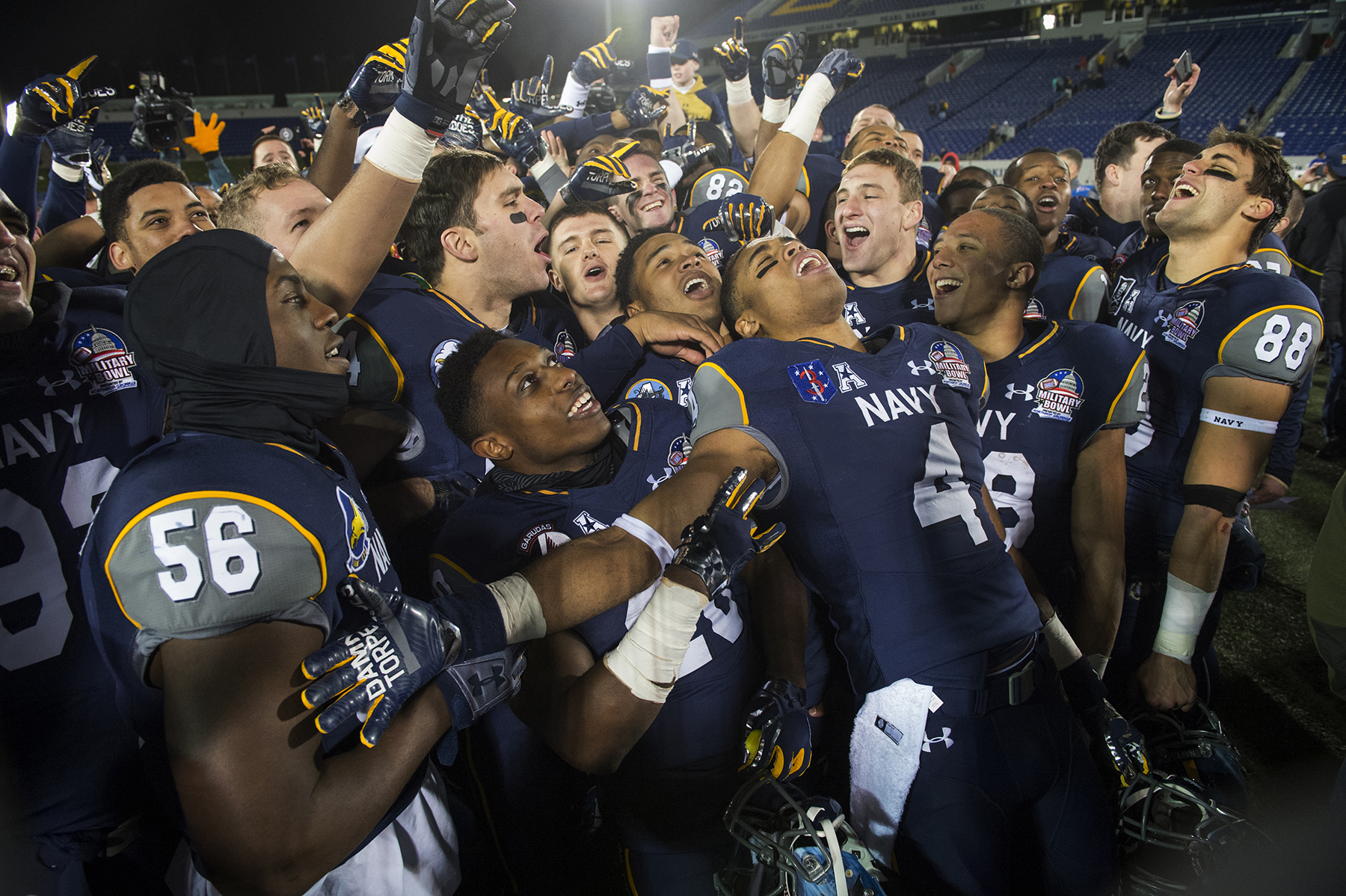
Navy players celebrating their Military Bowl victory

=== Statistics ===
Statistics	PITT	NAVY
First downs	17	31
Total offense, plays – yards	42–335	89–590
Rushes-yards (net)	21–198	71–417
Passing yards (net)	137	173
Passes, Comp-Att-Int	13–21–3	10–18–0
Time of Possession	17:55	42:05
