= 2017 Military Bowl =

2017 Military Bowl presented by Northrop Grumman
- 10th Military Bowl
Virginia Cavaliers	Navy Midshipmen
(6–6)	(6–6)
ACC	The American
7	49
Head coach: Bronco Mendenhall	Head coach: Ken Niumatalolo
	1	2	3	4	Total
Virginia	7	0	0	0	7
Navy	14	14	14	7	49
- Date: December 28, 2017
- Season: 2017
- Stadium: Navy–Marine Corps Memorial Stadium
- Location: Annapolis, Maryland
- MVP: Zach Abey (QB, Navy)
- Referee: Dan Romeo (Big XII)
- Attendance: 35,921

United States TV coverage
- Network: ESPN
- Announcers: TV: Clay Matvick, Kirk Morrison, Alex Corddry; Radio: John Brickley, Brad Edwards

The 2017 Military Bowl was a postseason college football bowl game played at Navy–Marine Corps Memorial Stadium in Annapolis, Maryland, on December 28, 2017. The game was the 10th edition of the Military Bowl and featured the Virginia Cavaliers of the Atlantic Coast Conference and the Navy Midshipmen of the American Athletic Conference. Sponsored by defense contractor Northrop Grumman, the game was officially known as the Military Bowl presented by Northrop Grumman.

== Teams ==
=== Virginia Cavaliers ===
The Virginia Cavaliers finished the regular season with a 6–6 record. This was the team's first appearance in the Military Bowl and their first bowl appearance since 2011.

=== Navy Midshipmen ===
The Navy Midshipmen had a 6–6 record in the regular season. This was the team's third appearance in the Military Bowl; they lost in 2008 (when the game was the EagleBank Bowl) and won in 2015.

== Game summary ==
=== Scoring summary ===
Scoring summary

Quarter	Time	Drive			Team	Scoring information	Score	
Quarter	Time	Plays	Yards	TOP	Team	Scoring information	UVA	Navy
1	14:48	0	0	0:12	UVA	Joe Reed 98-yd kickoff return for TD, A.J. Mejia kick	7	0
1	8:43	12	68	6:05	Navy	Zach Abey 1-yard touchdown run, Bennett Moehring kick good	7	7
1	4:18	6	55	2:52	Navy	Malcolm Perry 22-yard touchdown run, Bennett Moehring kick good	7	14
2	3:12	7	70	3:53	Navy	Malcolm Perry 19-yard touchdown run, Bennett Moehring kick good	7	21
2	1:39	4	36	1:15	Navy	Zach Abey 1-yard touchdown run, Bennett Moehring kick good	7	28
3	9:46	3	11	1:17	Navy	Zach Abey 5-yard touchdown run, Bennett Moehring kick good	7	35
3	1:57	8	80	3:54	Navy	Zach Abey 20-yard touchdown run, Bennett Moehring kick good	7	42
4	11:11	9	23	4:11	Navy	Zach Abey 1-yard touchdown run, Bennett Moehring kick good	7	49
"TOP" = time of possession. For other American football terms, see Glossary of American football.							7	49

=== Statistics ===
	1	2	3	4	Total
Cavaliers	7	0	0	0	7
Midshipmen	14	14	14	7	49

Statistics	UVA	Navy
First downs	11	24
Plays–yards	54–175	77–452
Rushes–yards	18–30	76–452
Passing yards	145	0
Passing: Comp–Att–Int	16–36–1	0–1–0
Time of possession	18:00	42:00

Team	Category	Player	Statistics
UVA	Passing	Kurt Benkert	16/36, 145 yds, 1 INT
UVA	Rushing	Jordan Ellis	11 car, 37 yds
UVA	Receiving	Olamide Zaccheaus	5 rec, 62 yds
Navy	Passing	Zach Abey	0/1, 0 yds
Navy	Rushing	Malcom Perry	16 car, 144 yds, 2 TD
Navy	Receiving	N/A	
