= Zach Abey =

American football quarterback

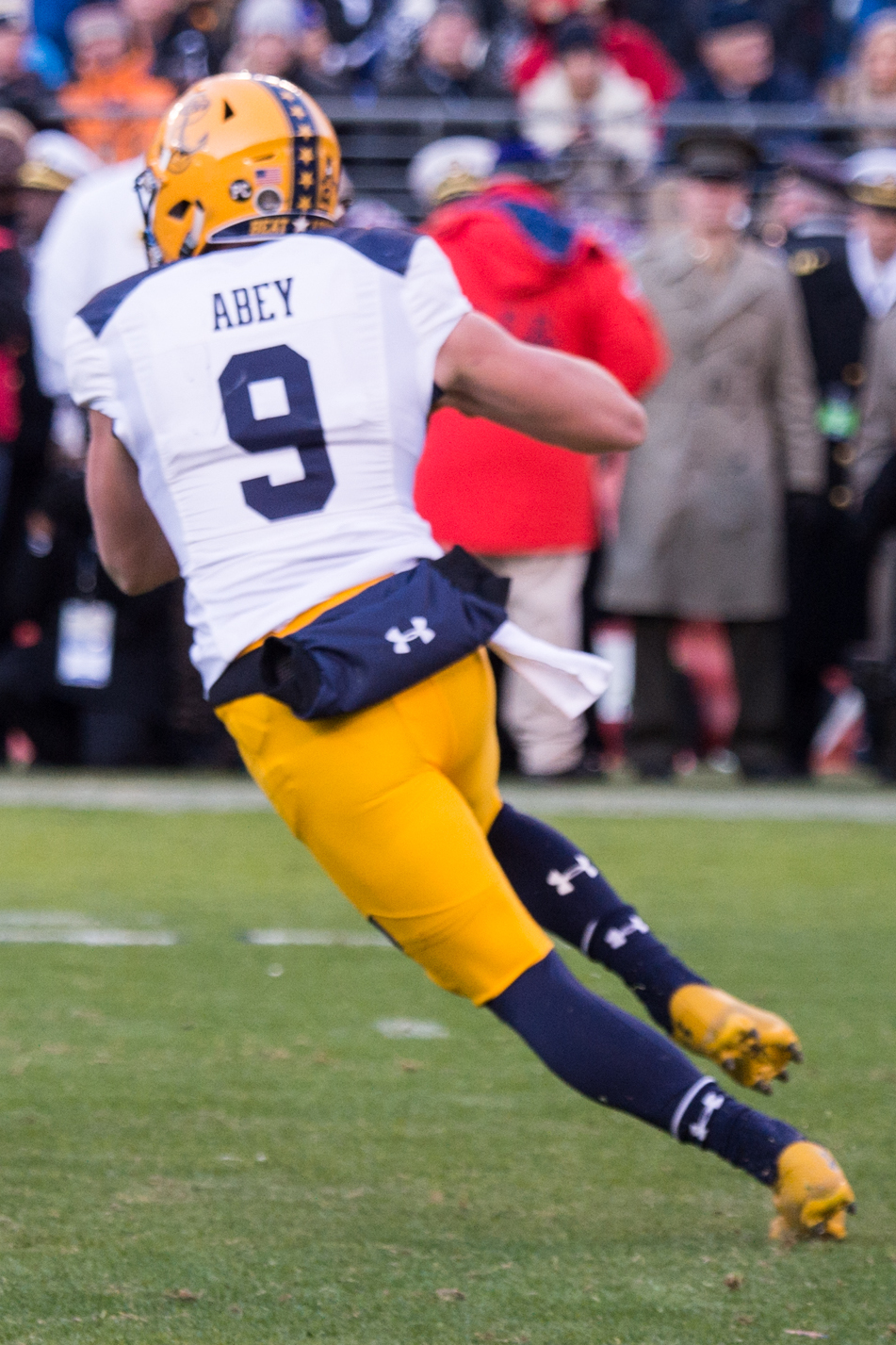
- Abey scrambling in the 2016 Army–Navy Game

No. 9
- Position: Quarterback/wide receiver

Personal information
- Listed height: 6 ft 2 in (1.88 m)
- Listed weight: 218 lb (99 kg)

Career information
- High school: Severn (MD) Archbishop Spalding
- College: Navy (2015–2018)
- Stats at ESPN

Zach Abey is an American former college football player who was a quarterback and wide receiver for the Navy Midshipmen.

== College career ==
=== 2015 season ===
Abey entered the 2015 season at the United States Naval Academy as the fourth-string quarterback, sitting behind Keenan Reynolds, Tago Smith, and Will Worth. He did not make a single in game appearance in 2015.

=== 2016 season ===
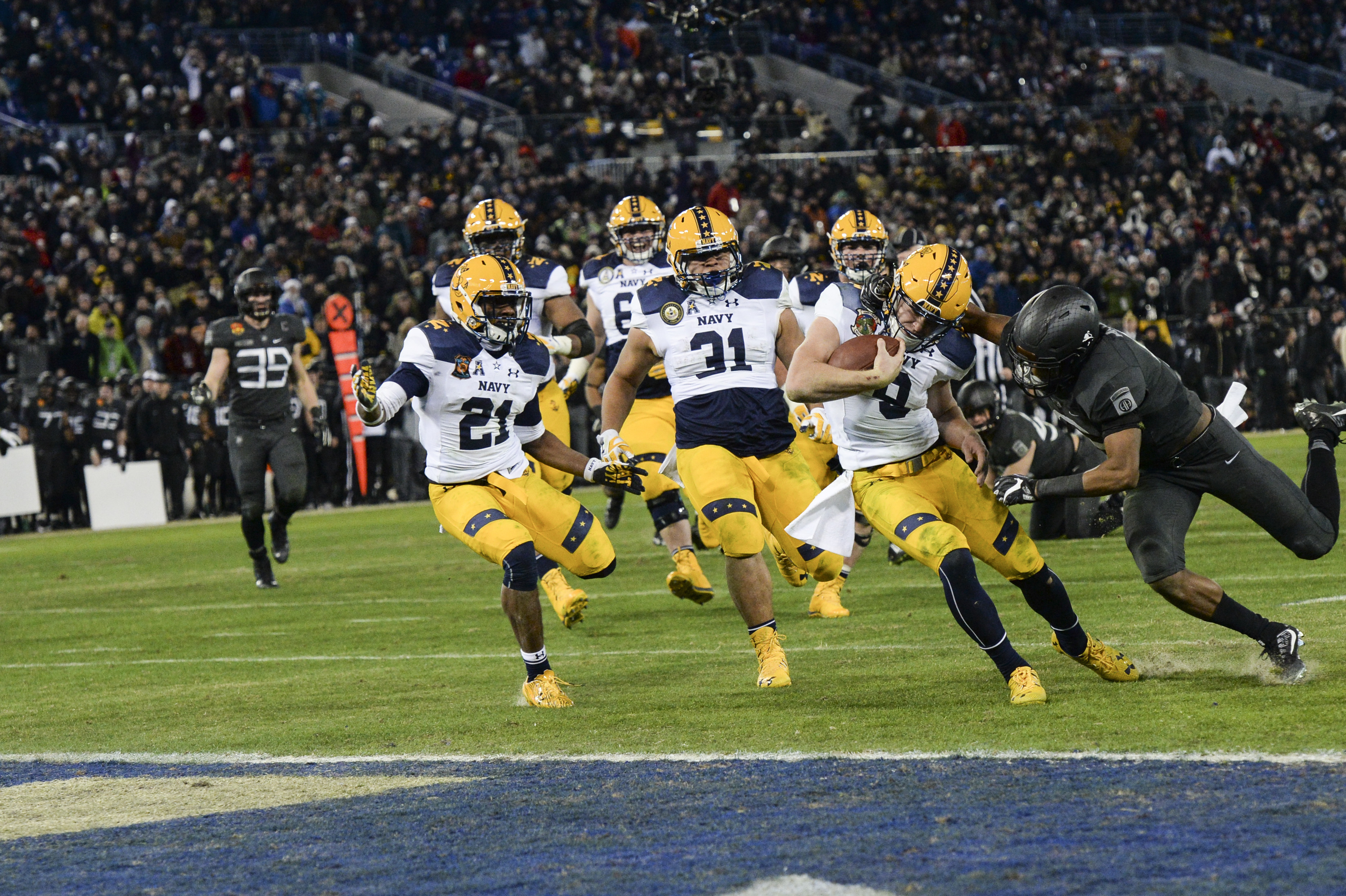
Abey fights off a tackle as he reaches the end zone in the 2016 Army–Navy Game

Abey began the 2016 season sitting behind Smith and Worth, but moved to second string after Smith suffered a season-ending injury in the season opener against Fordham and Worth became the starter. He appeared in the games the team played against East Carolina and SMU, performing mop-up duty during the large Navy wins. During the 2016 American Athletic Conference Football Championship Game, Worth injured his foot and Abey took over for the rest of the game. The Midshipmen lost 34–10 to the Temple Owls. Abey was the starter for the Army–Navy Game, where the Midshipmen lost 21–17 to their arch rival the Army Black Knights for the first time since 2001. He also started for the 2016 Armed Forces Bowl, where Navy lost 48–45 to Louisiana Tech.

=== 2017 season ===
Abey, now a junior, earned the spot of starting quarterback. In his third career start against Florida Atlantic, Abey rushed for 200 yards and passed for 100 yards. This achievement made it the first time in Naval Academy history that a Midshipmen quarterback has done so in a single game. He was named the AAC Co-Offensive Player of the Week.

Through the first five weeks of the 2017 season, Abey ranked fifth among all Division I FBS players with 656 rushing yards. Despite the Midshipmen starting the season 5–0, Abey began showing signs of struggling with reading defenses and pitching the ball on perimeter option players (forcing him to instead run up the middle through the line of scrimmage). In October, he suffered a concussion against UCF and a shoulder injury against Temple. Slotback Malcolm Perry replaced him at quarterback with the exceptions of the Notre Dame (injury to Perry) and Houston (moved back to slotback) games. Perry was eventually named the starter for the Military Bowl against Virginia. With his benching, Abey was considered for a fullback role, though head coach Ken Niumatalolo opted to keep him at quarterback as the backup.

In the Military Bowl, Abey recorded 88 rushing yards as part of a Navy bowl-record 452 total yards on the ground, along with a bowl-high five rushing touchdowns, becoming the first player to score five rushing touchdowns in an FBS bowl game since Kareem Hunt in 2015. He was named the game's Most Valuable Player.

Abey concluded the 2017 season with 1,413 rushing yards, the second highest in school history behind Napoleon McCallum's 1,587 in 1983.

=== 2018 season ===
Perry became the permanent starting quarterback for the 2018 season, while Abey was moved to wide receiver. After starting six games at receiver and missing the game against Air Force with a knee injury, Abey became the backup quarterback against Houston behind Garret Lewis when Perry moved to slotback. Abey returned to the starting quarterback role against Cincinnati.

Navy ended the season 3–10.

=== Statistics ===
Year	Team	Games	Passing									Rushing				
Year	Team	Games	Comp	Att	Yards	Avg	Lng	Pct.	TD	Int	QB rating	Att	Yards	Avg	Lng	TD
2015	Navy	0	0	0	0	—	—	—	0	0	—	0	0	—	—	0
2016	Navy	5	20	35	352	10.1	64	57.1	1	4	128.2	70	384	5.5	55	6
2017	Navy	12	31	72	805	11.2	79	43.1	7	7	149.6	293	1413	5.0	75	19
2018	Navy	11	12	28	306	8.8	73	42.9	1	2	114.2	125	306	2.4	15	14
Totals		29	63	135	1403	10.4	79	46.7	9	13	136.7	488	2103	4.3	75	39

== Post-college career ==
After graduating from the Naval Academy in May 2019, Abey was an assistant coach for the Midshipmen through the 2019 season before serving as a second lieutenant in the United States Marine Corps. Abey attended The Basic School, where he was selected as his first choice of Combat Engineer. He then attended Combat Engineer School at Camp Lejeune, NC where he also served his first full tour.

Abey was then selected to serve at Marine Corps Recruit Depot, Parris Island, SC where he served as a Company Commander and Operations Officer.

Abey was then selected to serve as a Company Officer at the Naval Academy Prep School in Newport Rhode Island, as of 2026.

As of 2024, Abey is a Marine captain. He is married with three sons.
