= Military Bowl =

Division I college football bowl game

- Freedom Mortgage Military Bowl
- Stadium: Navy–Marine Corps Memorial Stadium
- Location: Annapolis, Maryland
- Previous stadiums: Robert F. Kennedy Memorial Stadium
- Previous locations: Washington, D.C. (2008–2012)
- Operated: 2008–present
- Conference tie-ins: ACC, American
- Previous conference tie-ins: Army, Navy, C-USA
- Payout: US$2,066,990 (2019)
- Website: militarybowl.org

Sponsors
- EagleBank (2008–2009); Northrop Grumman (2010–2019); Perspecta Inc. (2020); Peraton (2021–2022); GoBowling.com (2023–2025)

Former names
- Congressional Bowl (2008, working title); EagleBank Bowl (2008–2009); Military Bowl presented by Northrop Grumman (2010–2019); Military Bowl presented by Perspecta (2020); Military Bowl presented by Peraton (2021–2022); Military Bowl presented by GoBowling.com (2023); GoBowling Military Bowl (2024-2025)

2025 matchup
- Pittsburgh vs. East Carolina (East Carolina 23–17)

The Military Bowl is a post-season National Collegiate Athletic Association-sanctioned Division I college football bowl game that has been played annually each December in the Washington metropolitan area since 2008. The game was originally held at Robert F. Kennedy Memorial Stadium in Washington, D.C. before moving to Navy–Marine Corps Memorial Stadium in Annapolis, Maryland, in 2013. The 2014 through 2019 games featured teams from the American Athletic Conference and the Atlantic Coast Conference.

During initial planning stages, the game was known as the Congressional Bowl, but was first played in 2008 as the EagleBank Bowl sponsored by Washington-area financial institution EagleBank. The game became the Military Bowl when Northrop Grumman was the title sponsor from 2010 to 2019. In 2020, the game was sponsored by Perspecta Inc. and officially known as the Military Bowl presented by Perspecta. In 2021, the game was sponsored by Peraton and known as the Military Bowl presented by Peraton. In 2023, a new agreement made the game the Military Bowl presented by GoBowling.com, and in 2024 the game became known as the Go Bowling Military Bowl. GoBowling.com is the website operated by the Bowling Proprietors’ Association of America to promote bowling as a sport. On May 19, 2026, Freedom Mortgage was named as the new sponsor of the game.

== Origins ==
The idea for the EagleBank Bowl originated with the Washington, D.C. Bowl Committee, a group founded by Marie Rudolph and Sean Metcalf in December 2006 with the intended purpose of bringing a bowl game to the Washington, D.C. area as a boon to the region's economy. The D.C. Sports and Entertainment Commission and the Washington, D.C. Convention and Tourism Corporation announced their support of the proposed event in 2007.

== History ==
The bowl game was one of two approved by the National Collegiate Athletic Association (NCAA) for the 2008 college football bowl season, the other being the St. Petersburg Bowl. The NCAA's Postseason Football Licensing Subcommittee approved the bowl on April 30, 2008, allowing the committee that had proposed the game to host it after the 2008 college football season. The inaugural game had its kickoff scheduled for 11 AM EST on December 20, 2008, making it the first bowl game of the 2008–09 bowl season.

In 2010, organizers announced that the NCAA had granted a four-year extension of the game's bowl certification, taking it through the 2013–14 bowl season; additionally, the game received sponsorship from Northrop Grumman and was renamed. In 2010, the game generated in excess of $18 million for the Washington, D.C. area. Also, over $100,000 was donated to the USO.

On December 20, 2020, several bowls were cancelled due to a lack of available teams. The Military Bowl – which again was to have featured teams from the American Athletic Conference and the Atlantic Coast Conference – was also unable to secure teams, and on December 21, 2020, organizers announced that the 2020 bowl would not be played.

On December 26, 2021, the 2021 edition of the bowl was canceled due to COVID issues within the Boston College team; it had been set to face East Carolina on December 27.

=== Conference tie-ins ===
Prior to the game's approval by the NCAA, Navy and the Atlantic Coast Conference (ACC) signed agreements to participate in the game if it was approved. Under the agreement, the ACC would provide its ninth-best team for the bowl if the league had nine bowl eligible teams. In December 2008, the initial game featured Navy against Wake Forest representing the ACC.

Along with its ACC tie-in, the bowl signed an agreement with Army to play in the 2009 edition of the game, however Army did not finish its season bowl eligible. Additionally, the ACC did not have enough eligible teams and Conference USA (C-USA) could not provide a team, so organizers chose Mid-American Conference (MAC) team Temple to fill one spot and Pac-10 Conference team UCLA to fill the other spot.

For the 2010 through 2013 games, the bowl reached agreement for an ACC team to face a C-USA team (2010), Navy (2011), Army (2012), and a Big 12 team (2013). If Navy or Army were not bowl eligible, a Big 12 team would be selected in 2011, and a C-USA team in 2012. In 2012, Army was not bowl eligible and the ACC could not supply a team, so a MAC vs. Western Athletic Conference (WAC) matchup was organized.

Starting with the 2014 game, organizers entered a six-year agreement for the game to feature an ACC vs. American Athletic Conference (The American) matchup. In July 2019, the bowl announced that the ACC vs. AAC arrangement would continue through the 2025–26 football season.

Season	Contracted tie-ins		Date played	Actual participants	
2008	ACC	Navy	December 20, 2008	ACC	Navy
2009	ACC	Army	December 29, 2009	MAC	Pac-10
2010	ACC	C-USA	December 29, 2010	ACC	C-USA
2011	ACC	Navy alt. Big 12	December 28, 2011	MAC	Mountain West
2012	ACC	Army alt. C-USA	December 27, 2012	MAC	WAC
2013	ACC	Big 12	December 27, 2013	ACC	C-USA
2014	ACC	The American	December 27, 2014	ACC	The American
2015	ACC	The American	December 28, 2015	ACC	The American
2016	ACC	The American	December 27, 2016	ACC	The American
2017	ACC	The American	December 28, 2017	ACC	The American
2018	ACC	The American	December 31, 2018	ACC	The American
2019	ACC	The American	December 27, 2019	ACC	The American
2022	ACC	The American	December 28, 2022	ACC	The American

Bold conference denotes winner of games played.

== Game results ==
Rankings are based on the AP Poll prior to the game.

No.	Date	Bowl name	Winning team		Losing team		Attendance
1	December 20, 2008	EagleBank Bowl	Wake Forest	29	Navy	19	28,777
2	December 29, 2009	EagleBank Bowl	UCLA	30	Temple	21	23,072
3	December 29, 2010	Military Bowl	Maryland	51	East Carolina	20	38,062
4	December 28, 2011	Military Bowl	Toledo	42	Air Force	41	25,042
5	December 27, 2012	Military Bowl	# 24 San Jose State	29	Bowling Green	20	17,835
6	December 27, 2013	Military Bowl	Marshall	31	Maryland	20	30,163
7	December 27, 2014	Military Bowl	Virginia Tech	33	Cincinnati	17	34,277
8	December 28, 2015	Military Bowl	# 21 Navy	44	Pittsburgh	28	36,352
9	December 27, 2016	Military Bowl	Wake Forest	34	# 23 Temple	26	26,656
10	December 28, 2017	Military Bowl	Navy	49	Virginia	7	35,921
11	December 31, 2018	Military Bowl	Cincinnati	35	Virginia Tech	31	32,832
12	December 27, 2019	Military Bowl	North Carolina	55	Temple	13	24,242
—	December 28, 2020	Canceled due to lack of available teams					—
—	December 27, 2021	Canceled due to COVID-19 issues (Note: The 2021 game was to feature East Carolina vs. Boston College.)					—
13	December 28, 2022	Military Bowl	Duke	30	UCF	13	17,974
14	December 27, 2023	Military Bowl	Virginia Tech	41	# 23 Tulane	20	35,849
15	December 28, 2024	Military Bowl	East Carolina	26	NC State	21	23,981
16	December 27, 2025	Military Bowl	East Carolina	23	Pittsburgh	17	17,016

First five editions played at Robert F. Kennedy Memorial Stadium in Washington, D.C.
Subsequent games played at Navy–Marine Corps Memorial Stadium in Annapolis, Maryland

== MVPs ==
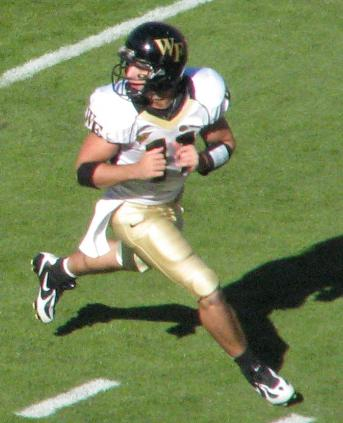
2008 MVP Riley Skinner

Date	MVP	School	Position
December 20, 2008	Riley Skinner	Wake Forest	QB
December 29, 2009	Akeem Ayers	UCLA	LB
December 29, 2010	Da'Rel Scott	Maryland	RB
December 28, 2011	Bernard Reedy	Toledo	WR
December 27, 2012	David Fales	San Jose State	QB
December 27, 2013	Rakeem Cato	Marshall	QB
December 27, 2014	J. C. Coleman	Virginia Tech	RB
December 28, 2015	Keenan Reynolds	Navy	QB
December 27, 2016	Thomas Brown	Wake Forest	LB
December 28, 2017	Zach Abey	Navy	QB
December 31, 2018	Mike Warren	Cincinnati	RB
December 27, 2019	Sam Howell	North Carolina	QB
December 28, 2022	Riley Leonard	Duke	QB
December 27, 2023	Kyron Drones	Virginia Tech	QB
December 28, 2024	Rahjai Harris	East Carolina	RB
December 27, 2025	Anthony Smith	East Carolina	WR

== Most appearances ==
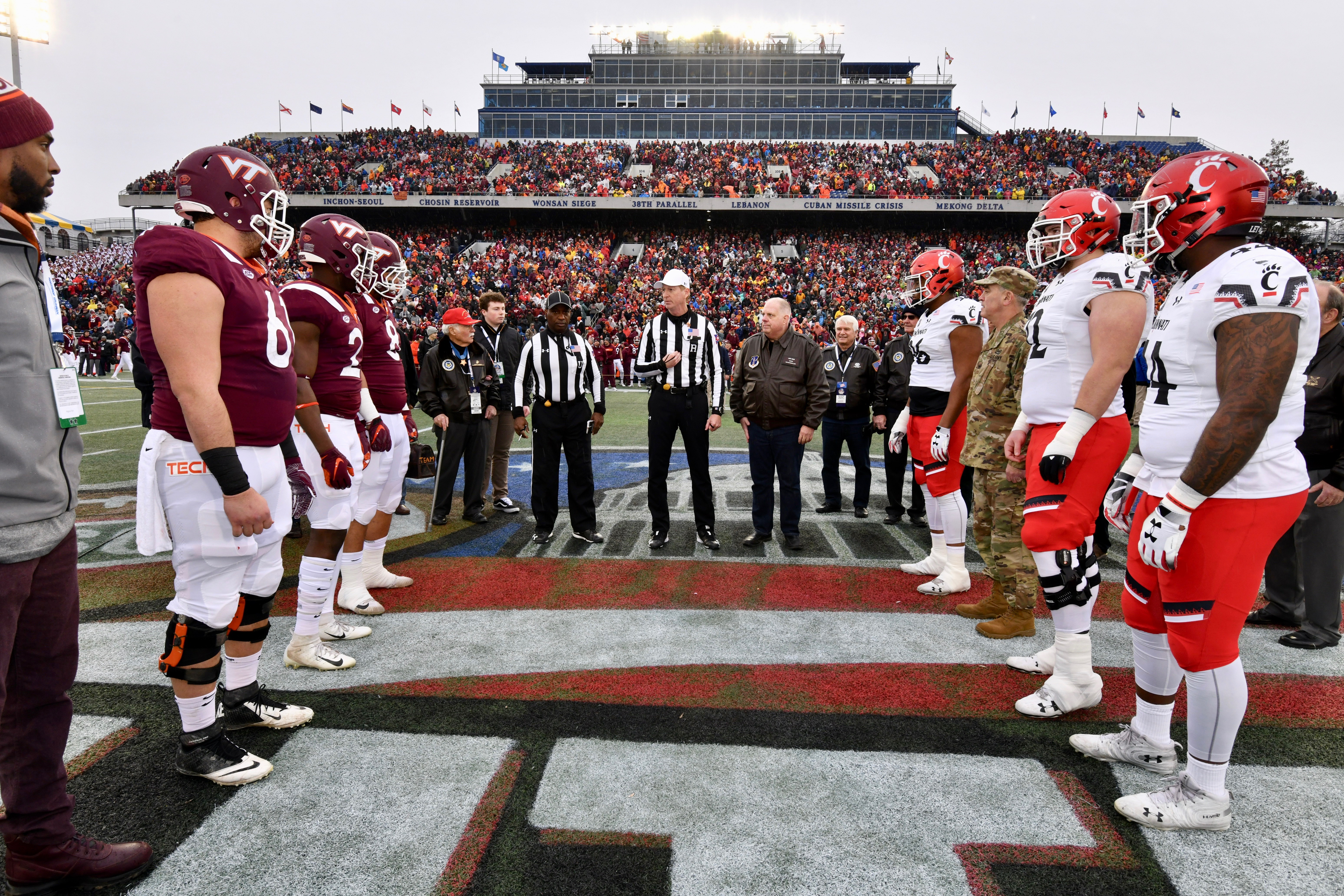
Coin toss prior to the 2018 game

Updated through the December 2025 edition (16 games, 32 total appearances).

Teams with multiple appearances

Rank	Team	Appearances	Record
1	Navy	3	2–1
1	Virginia Tech	3	2–1
1	East Carolina	3	2–1
1	Temple	3	0–3
5	Wake Forest	2	2–0
5	Cincinnati	2	1–1
5	Maryland	2	1–1
5	Pittsburgh	2	0–2

Teams with a single appearance

Won (6): Duke, Marshall, North Carolina, San Jose State, Toledo, UCLA
Lost (6): Air Force, Bowling Green, NC State, Tulane, UCF, Virginia

== Appearances by conference ==
Updated through the December 2025 edition (16 games, 32 total appearances).

Conference	Record				Appearances by season	
Conference	Games	W	L	Win %	Won	Lost
ACC	13	7	6	.538	2008, 2010, 2014, 2016, 2019, 2022, 2023	2013, 2015, 2017, 2018, 2024, 2025
American	10	5	5	.500	2015, 2017, 2018, 2024, 2025	2014, 2016, 2019, 2022, 2023
MAC	3	1	2	.333	2011	2009, 2012
CUSA	2	1	1	.500	2013	2010
Pac-10	1	1	0	1.000	2009	
WAC	1	1	0	1.000	2012	
Independents	1	0	1	.000		2008
Mountain West	1	0	1	.000		2011

- The WAC no longer sponsors FBS football.
- Independent appearances: Navy (2008)

== Game records ==
Team	Record, Team vs. Opponent	Year
Most points scored (one team)	55, North Carolina vs. Temple	2019
Most points scored (losing team)	41, Air Force vs. Toledo	2011
Most points scored (both teams)	83, Toledo vs. Air Force	2011
Fewest points allowed	7, Navy vs. Virginia	2017
Largest margin of victory	42, shared by: Navy vs. Virginia; North Carolina vs. Temple	2017; 2019
Total yards	590, Navy vs. Pittsburgh	2015
Rushing yards	452, Navy vs. Virginia	2017
Passing yards	396, Temple vs. Wake Forest	2016
First downs	33, North Carolina vs. Temple	2019
Fewest yards allowed	175, Navy vs. Virginia	2017
Fewest rushing yards allowed	–20, Wake Forest vs. Temple	2016
Fewest passing yards allowed	0, Virginia vs. Navy	2017
Individual	Record, Player, Team vs. Opponent	Year
All-purpose yards		
Touchdowns (all-purpose)	5, Zach Abey, Navy vs. Virginia	2017
Rushing yards	220, Rahjai Harris, East Carolina vs. NC State	2024
Rushing touchdowns	5, Zach Abey, Navy vs. Virginia	2017
Passing yards	396, Phillip Walker, Temple vs. Wake Forest	2016
Passing touchdowns	3, shared by: Terrance Owens, Toledo vs. Air Force; Rakeem Cato, Marshall vs. Maryland	2011; 2013
Receiving yards	156, Anthony Smith, East Carolina vs. Pittsburgh	2025
Receiving touchdowns	3, Bernard Reedy, Toledo vs. Air Force	2011
Tackles	19, Matt Galambos, Pittsburgh vs. Navy	2015
Sacks	2 shared by: Josh Banks, Wake Forest vs. Temple; Cam Dillon, Duke vs. UCF; Kendrick Dujour, ECU vs. Pittsburgh; Rasheem Biles, Pittsburgh vs. ECU	2016; 2022; 2025; 2025
Interceptions	2, Brendon Clements, Navy vs. Pittsburgh	2015
Long Plays	Record, Player, Team vs. Opponent	Year
Touchdown run	91, Da'Rel Scott, Maryland vs. East Carolina	2010
Touchdown pass	72, Chaston Ditta to Anthony Smith, ECU vs. Pittsburgh	2025
Kickoff return	100, Quadree Henderson, Pittsburgh vs. Navy	2015
Punt return	47, Terrence Austin, UCLA vs. Temple	2009
Interception return	37, Jermaine Robinson, Toledo vs. Air Force	2011
Fumble return	50, Rashawn King, Navy vs. Wake Forest	2008
Punt	61, Will Karoll, Tulane vs. Virginia Tech	2023
Field goal	49 shared by: Joey Slye, Virginia Tech vs. Cincinnati; Valentino Ambrosio, Tulane vs. Virginia Tech	2014; 2023

== Media coverage ==
The bowl has been televised by ESPN since its inception.

== See also ==
- Sports in Washington, D.C.
