= Ken Niumatalolo =

American football player and coach (born 1965)

- Niumatalolo in 2026

Current position
- Title: Head coach
- Team: San Jose State
- Conference: MW
- Record: 15–22

Biographical details
- Born: May 8, 1965 (age 61); Laie, Hawaii, U.S.

Playing career
- 1986–1989: Hawaii
- Position: Quarterback

Coaching career (HC unless noted)
- 1990–1994: Hawaii (GA)
- 1995–1996: Navy (RB)
- 1997–1998: Navy (OC/QB)
- 1999–2001: UNLV (TE/ST)
- 2002–2007: Navy (AHC/OL)
- 2007–2022: Navy
- 2023: UCLA (TE)
- 2024–present: San Jose State

Administrative career (AD unless noted)
- 2023: UCLA (director of leadership)

Head coaching record
- Overall: 124–105
- Bowls: 6–6

Accomplishments and honors

Championships
- 3 AAC West Division (2015, 2016, 2019)

Awards
- 3× AAC Coach of the Year (2015, 2016, 2019) Polynesian Football Hall of Fame (2014)

Kenneth Va'a Niumatalolo (born May 8, 1965) is an American college football coach and former player who is the head coach at San José State University. He was the head coach of the United States Naval Academy from 2007 to 2022, accumulating the most wins in program history. Niumatalolo played college football at the University of Hawaii. As a quarterback, he led Hawaii to their first postseason bowl game in 1989. Niumatalolo is the second person of Polynesian descent to be named head coach of an NCAA Division I FBS college football program and the first ethnic Samoan collegiate head coach on any level. Niumatalolo was inducted into the Polynesian Football Hall of Fame on January 23, 2014.

== Before coaching ==
Ken Niumatalolo is the son of parents who were both born in American Samoa, Simi and Lamala Niumatalolo. His father, Simi, retired from the U.S. Coast Guard.

Niumatalolo was a star in both football and basketball at Radford High School in Honolulu, graduating in 1983. He went on to play at the University of Hawaiʻi at Mānoa, eventually becoming the team's starting quarterback after serving for two years as a missionary for the Church of Jesus Christ of Latter-day Saints (LDS Church) in the California Ventura Mission. He served as a Spanish-speaking missionary. At the time, the mission covered Ventura County, California and extended northward to take in the greater Bakersfield, California area. During his time with the Rainbows at the University of Hawaii, he ran an option-oriented offense under the direction of Paul Johnson, who was then the offensive coordinator.

== Coaching ==
=== Hawaii ===
Niumatalolo stayed on at Hawaii after his graduation, taking a position as a graduate assistant under Johnson. By 1992, he had been elevated to a full-time assistant position.

=== Navy ===
When Johnson left Hawaii to become the offensive coordinator at the Naval Academy in 1995, Niumatalolo went with him as the running backs coach. The following season, Niumatalolo was elevated to offensive coordinator after Johnson left to take the head coaching job at Georgia Southern. While the offensive coordinator at Navy, Niumatalolo tutored quarterback Chris McCoy, who set a Division I-A record in 1997 for rushing touchdowns by a quarterback with 20, a record that was broken in 2007 by Florida's Tim Tebow. On December 12, 2009, at the annual Army-Navy football game, Navy quarterback Ricky Dobbs reclaimed the record with 27 touchdowns in the 2009 season.

=== UNLV ===
In 1999, Niumatalolo left Annapolis to become an assistant at UNLV. While there, he called the plays and also worked with the kickoff return unit.

=== Return to Navy ===
==== Assistant coach ====
Niumatalolo returned to Annapolis in 2002 when he was hired by Johnson, who had just taken over the head coaching job at Navy, as the offensive line coach. Niumatalolo's work helped Navy establish a rushing attack that led NCAA Division I-A/FBS in yards per game in four of his first five seasons back at Navy, including an unprecedented three consecutive seasons leading the nation in that category (2004 through 2006). In 2008, Navy averaged 292.4 yards per game on the ground, leading the nation for the fourth straight year in the category.

This rushing game helped Navy football reach a level of success it had not seen in decades. Navy went 45–29 under Johnson and appeared in a bowl game every year from 2003 through Johnson's last season in Annapolis in 2007. The Mids also won the Commander-in-Chief's Trophy, the annual football trophy contested by Navy, Army and Air Force, from 2003 through 2007.

The 2006 first-class midshipmen (seniors, Class of 2007) went 8–0 against the other academies during their careers at Navy. The Class of 2009 repeated this achievement during the 2008 season with the seventh straight victory over Army and the sixth straight victory over Air Force. Under Johnson, Navy also ended the Mids' long losing streak against Notre Dame in 2007 with a 46–44 triple-overtime win.

==== Head coach ====
Niumatalolo (right) with President George W. Bush at the White House in 2008

Niumatalolo was promoted to head football coach at the Naval Academy on December 8, 2007, by Naval Academy Director of Athletics Chet Gladchuk after Johnson departed for Georgia Tech. Niumatalolo became the 38th head football coach in Naval Academy history. On January 7, 2009, Niumatalolo was given a contract extension, although terms and length of the extension were not released.

With Niumatalolo as Navy's head coach, beginning with the 2008 season, the Mids continued their run of success. Highlights in 2008 included an upset in Winston-Salem over #16 Wake Forest, 24–17, the Mids' first victory over a ranked team in 23 years, and a 34–0 shutout victory of Army.

Other highlights of Niumatalolo's years as head coach at Navy include:

- Navy defeated Army in each of Niumatalolo's first nine seasons as head coach, not losing to Army until 2016. The 2016 loss ended a streak of 14 Midshipmen wins in the Army–Navy Game, the longest winning streak for either side in the rivalry.
- The Midshipmen captured the Commander-in-Chief's Trophy in 2008, 2009 and 2012. They went on to capture the trophy outright in 2013, with a 34–7 win against Army, and recaptured it outright in 2015 with wins over Army and Air Force.
- The Midshipmen have 10 winning seasons during Niumatalolo's 10 full years as head coach. The Mids have played in nine bowl games during Niumatalolo's tenure, winning the 2009 Texas Bowl, 2013 Armed Forces Bowl, 2014 Poinsettia Bowl, and 2015 Military Bowl.
- Navy defeated longtime rival Notre Dame in consecutive years, 2009 and 2010, for the first time since the early 1960s. The Midshipmen also defeated Notre Dame in 2016.

Navy announced on December 11, 2022, that Niumatololo would not be retained for the 2023 season, a day after an overtime loss to Army and following the third consecutive season of four wins or fewer. He was succeeded as Navy's head coach by Brian Newberry.

=== UCLA ===
After departing Navy, Niumatalolo was hired by UCLA as a director of leadership for the 2023 season. As part of his duties, he served as an advisor for players and coaches. The hiring reunited him with his son Ali'i, a graduate assistant with the Bruins, and former Navy director football of operations Bryce McDonald.

He was the acting tight ends coach for the LA Bowl after Jeff Faris was hired by Austin Peay, then was elevated to a permanent position on January 5, 2024. However, he departed the position two weeks later to accept the head coaching job at San Jose State.

=== San Jose State ===
Niumatalolo was named San Jose State's head coach on January 21, 2024, replacing Brent Brennan. He received a five-year contract from the school. In his first year, he led the team to the 2024 Hawaii bowl, and coached San Jose State's first consensus all-American, Nick Nash.

== Personal life ==
Niumatalolo has a wife, Barbara, a daughter, Alexcia, and two sons: Va'a and Ali'i. Va'a played football for the BYU Cougars and was a graduate assistant for the Hawaii Rainbow Warriors. Va'a is currently the assistant to the director of football operations for the Navy Midshipmen. Ali'i played football as a tight end for the Utah Utes under head coach Kyle Whittingham. After graduating in 2022, Ali'i was hired by Whittingham as a quality control coach. After stints with the UCLA Bruins, Utah Tech Trailblazers, and Utah State Aggies, Ali'i was hired by Whittingham as the assistant tight ends coach for the Michigan Wolverines in 2026.

Niumatalolo's mother, Lamala, died in September 2013, while his brother James died December 29, 2015, in a drowning accident while swimming in the ocean near their hometown of Laie, Hawaii.

Niumatalolo is a member of The Church of Jesus Christ of Latter-day Saints. He is one of the six main people featured in the documentary film Meet the Mormons. Among other callings in the LDS Church, Niumatalolo has served as the Young Men president in his ward in Maryland, as a counselor in a bishopric, and from January 2019 until the end of his tenure at the Naval Academy, as president of the church's Annapolis, Maryland Stake.

== Head coaching record ==
| Year | Team | Overall | Conference | Standing | Bowl/playoffs | Coaches^{#} | AP^{°} |
|---|---|---|---|---|---|---|---|
Navy Midshipmen (NCAA Division I FBS independent) (2007–2014)
| 2007 | Navy | 0–1* | | | L Poinsettia | | |
| 2008 | Navy | 8–5 | | | L EagleBank | | |
| 2009 | Navy | 10–4 | | | W Texas | | |
| 2010 | Navy | 9–4 | | | L Poinsettia | | |
| 2011 | Navy | 5–7 | | | | | |
| 2012 | Navy | 8–5 | | | L Fight Hunger | | |
| 2013 | Navy | 9–4 | | | W Armed Forces | | |
| 2014 | Navy | 8–5 | | | W Poinsettia | | |
Navy Midshipmen (American Athletic Conference) (2015–2022)
| 2015 | Navy | 11–2 | 7–1 | T–1st (West) | W Military | 18 | 18 |
| 2016 | Navy | 9–5 | 7–1 | 1st (West) | L Armed Forces | | |
| 2017 | Navy | 7–6 | 4–4 | T–3rd (West) | W Military | | |
| 2018 | Navy | 3–10 | 2–6 | T–5th (West) | | | |
| 2019 | Navy | 11–2 | 7–1 | T–1st (West) | W Liberty | 20 | 20 |
| 2020 | Navy | 3–7 | 3–4 | 7th | | | |
| 2021 | Navy | 4–8 | 3–5 | T–7th | | | |
| 2022 | Navy | 4–8 | 4–4 | T–6th | | | |
| Navy: | | 109–83 | 37–26 | | | | |
San Jose State Spartans (Mountain West Conference) (2024–present)
| 2024 | San Jose State | 7–6 | 3–4 | T–5th | L Hawaii | | |
| 2025 | San Jose State | 3–9 | 2–6 | T–9th | | | |
| 2026 | San Jose State | 5–7 | 3-5 | | | | |
| San Jose State: | | 15–22 | 8–15 | | | | |
| Total: | | 124–105 | | | | | |
National championship Conference title Conference division title or championship game berth
^{#}Rankings from final Coaches Poll.; ^{°}Rankings from final AP Poll.
