= EagleBank =

Community bank headquartered in Bethesda, Maryland, US

Eagle Bancorp, Inc.
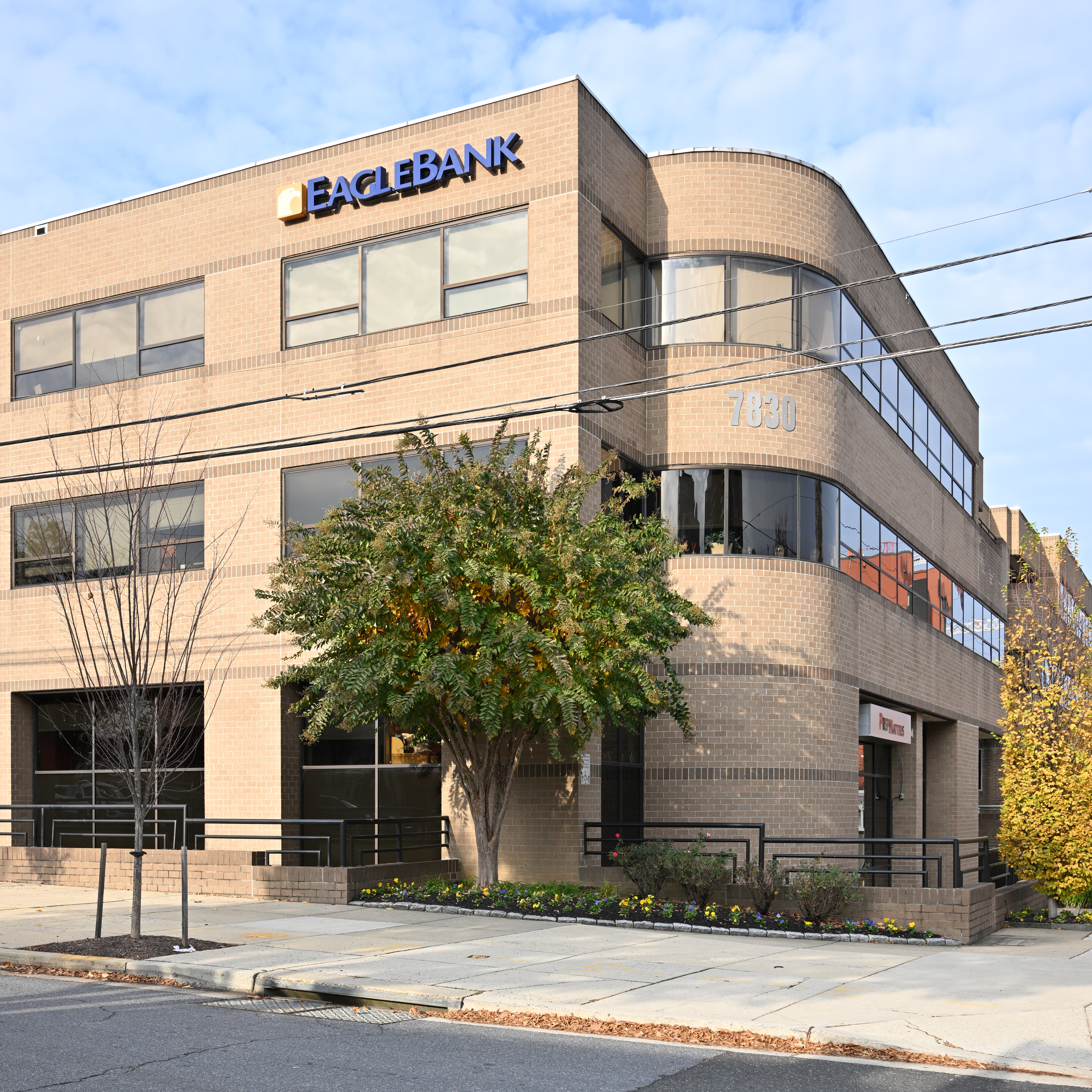
- EagleBank corporate HQ
- Type: Public
- Traded as: Nasdaq: EGBN; S&P 600 component Russell 2000 Index component
- Industry: Financial services
- Founded: July 20, 1998; 28 years ago
- Founder: Ronald D. Paul
- Headquarters: Bethesda, Maryland
- Number of locations: 12 branches and 4 lending offices
- Key people: Steve Curley (President & CEO); Eric R. Newell (CFO)
- Products: Banking
- Revenue: ▼US$299 million (2025)
- Net income: ▼US$(138 million) (2025)
- Total assets: ▼US$10.5 billion (2025)
- Total equity: ▼US$1.13 billion (2025)
- Number of employees: 475 (2025)
- Capital ratio: 14.33% (2025) Total Capital Ratio
- Website: eaglebankcorp.com

EagleBank is a community bank headquartered in Bethesda, Maryland with operations in the Washington, D.C. metropolitan area including 12 branches and four lending offices in Montgomery and Prince George's Counties, Maryland; Washington, D.C.; and Northern Virginia. The bank has an above average exposure to commercial real estate, with 83% of all loans secured by commercial real estate. The bank owns the naming rights to the EagleBank Arena.

== History ==
The bank was founded in 1998 under the holding company Eagle Bancorp Inc, which was established in 1997 by Ronald D. Paul. Eagle Bancorp, Inc., was incorporated as a bank holding company in Maryland on October 28, 1997. On June 9, 1998, the company became a public company via an initial public offering. On July 20, 1998, EagleBank opened its first office in Rockville, Maryland. In the coming years, the bank opened several branches in the Washington, D.C. area.

In December 2008, the United States Department of the Treasury purchased $38.2 million of assets from EagleBank as part of the Troubled Asset Relief Program. In 2010, EagleBank received $71.9 million funding so it could lend more to small businesses as part of the United States Department of Treasury's Small Business Jobs Act of 2010. The funds were repaid to the US Treasury by EagleBank in 2015 after a stock sale.

In 2013, EagleBank teamed with Graystone Consulting to provide wealth management services.

In March 2019, EagleBank's founder and CEO, Ron Paul, announced his retirement. Susan G. Riel was appointed CEO and President and Norm Pozez was appointed chairman.

During the COVID-19 pandemic, the bank was a lender in the Paycheck Protection Program.

=== Notable Acquisitions ===
In September 2008, EagleBank bought Fidelity and Trust Bank in a $13.1 million transaction. In July 2011, EagleBank announced it would buy Alliance Bank for $31 million, but the transaction was called off five months later because they could not agree on the terms of the deal. In November 2014, EagleBank acquired Virginia Heritage Bank for $183 million.

== Sponsorships ==
The bank owned the naming rights to the 2008 EagleBank Bowl and the 2009 EagleBank Bowl, later called the Military Bowl, a college football bowl game.

The Bank purchased the naming rights to the EagleBank Arena in May 2015 in a partnership deal with George Mason University.

EagleBank and D.C. United entered into a five-year partnership in 2018 which ended in 2024. During this time period, EagleBank became the official bank of D.C. United and the EagleBank Club at Audi Field was created.

The EagleBank Foundation was founded in 2005. Its mission is to serve as a catalyst for positive change in its community through financial support and other resources to 501(c)(3) organizations in the Washington Metropolitan Area that provide underserved individuals who are in need of medical or social services to treat breast cancer, other types of cancer, or other medical or social needs. The Foundation’s annual Golf Classic has raised over $7.0 million for Cancer Research -- enabling local hospitals and other cancer-focused organizations in the community to continue ongoing research and provide support services — all dedicated to putting an end to cancer.

== Controversies ==
In 2011, the company was reported to be the source of legislation introduced by Council of the District of Columbia member Jack Evans that would require the city's funds to be held at local banks.

On July 18, 2019, the company's stock price fell as much as 25% after it disclosed that it had spent $2.7 million on legal fees related to the relationship between a former director and Council of the District of Columbia member Jack Evans. It had previously been disclosed that Ron Paul had received a subpoena related to his relationship with Evans.

In 2022, the company was ordered to pay $22.9M to the Securities and Exchange Commission (SEC) and the Federal Reserve to settle claims the bank's former CEO had engaged in insider lending. Former EagleBank CEO Ron Paul has been banned permanently from working in the banking industry and he was fined about $521,000. The 2022 settlement ended a 3-year probe by regulators into alleged third-party lending and improper disclosures by EagleBank.

== Awards and recognition ==
In 2020, the bank ranked second on the Women on Public Company Boards in Greater D.C. list by American City Business Journals.

In 2025, the bank ranked in the top 25 public companies in the DC area with most women directors on their boards.

For the past four years, EagleBank has ranked near the top of Washington Business Journal’s list of Top Corporate Philanthropists for DC area’s midsize companies for both for giving and volunteer hours. The Bank financially supports the community and their employees for their commitment to making a difference.
