= 2008 EagleBank Bowl =

- 1st EagleBank Bowl
Wake Forest Demon Deacons	Navy Midshipmen
(7–5)	(8–4)
ACC	Independent
29	19
Head coach: Jim Grobe	Head coach: Ken Niumatalolo
	1	2	3	4	Total
Wake Forest	0	7	7	15	29
Navy	10	3	0	6	19
- Date: December 20, 2008
- Season: 2008
- Stadium: Robert F. Kennedy Memorial Stadium
- Location: Washington D.C.
- MVP: QB Riley Skinner, Wake Forest
- Referee: Land Clark (WAC)
- Attendance: 28,777
- Payout: US$750,000 per team

United States TV coverage
- Network: ESPN
- Announcers: Terry Gannon, David Norrie, Quint Kessenich
- Nielsen ratings: 1.9

The 2008 EagleBank Bowl was the inaugural edition of the new college football bowl game, and was played at Robert F. Kennedy Memorial Stadium in Washington, DC. The game, formerly known as the Congressional Bowl before naming rights were purchased by EagleBank, started at 11 a.m. US EST on Saturday, December 20, 2008, as the first contest of the 2008–09 bowl season. The game, telecast on ESPN, pit the Wake Forest Demon Deacons against the Navy Midshipmen. This was a rematch of a September 27, 2008, game between the two teams that Navy won, 24–17, at Wake Forest. The Demon Deacons got a measure of revenge by winning the game, 29–19.

== Scoring summary ==
Scoring Play	Score
1st Quarter
Navy – Matt Harmon 40-yard FG, 10:14	Navy 3–0
Navy – Rashawn King 50-yard fumble return (Harmon kick), 7:51	Navy 10–0
2nd Quarter
Navy – Harmon 47-yard FG, 12:32	Navy 13–0
WF – Josh Adams 4-yard TD run (Sam Swank kick), 0:36	Navy 13–7
3rd Quarter
WF – Adams 5-yard TD run (Swank kick), 5:50	WF 14–13
4th Quarter
Navy – Kaipo-Noa Kaheaku-Enhada 2-yard TD run (pass failed), 12:30	Navy 19–14
WF – Ben Wooster 8-yard TD pass from Riley Skinner (Devon Brown pass from Skinner), 7:52	WF 22–19
WF – Rich Belton 35-yard TD run (Swank kick), :54	WF 29–19

== See also ==
- List of college football post-season games that were rematches of regular season games
