= 2008 Navy Midshipmen football team =

American college football season

2008 Navy Midshipmen football
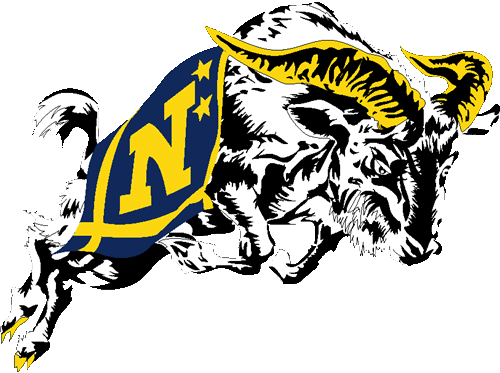

EagleBank Bowl, L 19–29 vs. Wake Forest
- Conference: Independent
- Record: 8–5
- Head coach: Ken Niumatalolo (1st season)
- Offensive coordinator: Ivin Jasper (1st season)
- Offensive scheme: Triple option
- Defensive coordinator: Buddy Green (7th season)
- Base defense: Multiple
- MVP: Shun White
- Captains: Clint Sovie; Jarod Bryant
- Home stadium: Navy–Marine Corps Memorial Stadium

2008 NCAA Division I FBS independents football records
	Conf.			Overall
Team	W		L	W		L
Navy		–		8	–	5
Notre Dame		–		7	–	6
Army		–		3	–	9
WKU		–		2	–	10
Rankings from AP Poll

The 2008 Navy Midshipmen football team represented the United States Naval Academy (USNA) as an independent during the 2008 NCAA Division I FBS football season. The team was led by first-year head coach Ken Niumatalolo. He was promoted from the offensive line coach before the season, after his predecessor, Paul Johnson, accepted the head coaching position at Georgia Tech.

The Midshipmen finished the regular season with an 8–4 record to attain bowl eligibility. Navy secured a berth in the inaugural EagleBank Bowl, which had a tie-in with the two independent military academies, the other being Army. The other tie-in was with the Atlantic Coast Conference (ACC). Due to a chaotic and closely contested season in the ACC, in the EagleBank Bowl, Navy ended up playing Wake Forest in a re-match of a regular season game, despite a statement in their contracting disallowing it. Unlike the earlier game, Navy lost the rematch against Wake Forest, 29–19.

== Schedule ==
Date	Time	Opponent	Site	TV	Result	Attendance
August 30	3:30 p.m.	Towson	Navy–Marine Corps Memorial Stadium; Annapolis, MD	CBSCS	W 41–13	31,613
September 5	7:00 p.m.	at Ball State	Scheumann Stadium; Muncie, IN	ESPN	L 23–35	22,517
September 13	12:00 p.m.	at Duke	Wallace Wade Stadium; Durham, NC	ESPNU	L 31–41	25,082
September 20	3:30 p.m.	Rutgers	Navy–Marine Corps Memorial Stadium; Annapolis, MD	CBSCS	W 23–21	37,821
September 27	3:30 p.m.	at No. 16 Wake Forest	BB&T Field; Winston-Salem, NC	ESPNU	W 24–17	33,173
October 4	4:00 p.m.	at Air Force	Falcon Stadium; Colorado Springs, CO (Commander-in-Chief's Trophy)	Versus	W 33–27	46,339
October 18	3:30 p.m.	No. 23 Pittsburgh	Navy–Marine Corps Memorial Stadium; Annapolis, MD	CBSCS	L 21–42	37,970
October 25	3:30 p.m.	SMU	Navy–Marine Corps Memorial Stadium; Annapolis, MD (rivalry)	CBSCS	W 34–7	31,698
November 1	3:30 p.m.	Temple	Navy–Marine Corps Memorial Stadium; Annapolis, MD	CBSCS	W 33–27 ^{OT}	34,775
November 15	12:00 p.m.	vs. Notre Dame	M&T Bank Stadium; Baltimore, MD (rivalry)	CBS	L 21–27	70,932
November 25	7:00 p.m.	at Northern Illinois	Huskie Stadium; DeKalb, IL	ESPNC	W 16–0	17,932
December 6	12:00 p.m.	vs. Army	Lincoln Financial Field; Philadelphia, PA (Army–Navy Game)	CBS	W 34–0	69,144
December 20	11:00 a.m.	vs. Wake Forest	Robert F. Kennedy Memorial Stadium; Washington, DC (EagleBank Bowl)	ESPN	L 19–29	28,777
Rankings from AP Poll released prior to the game; All times are in Eastern time
