= 2008 Wake Forest Demon Deacons football team =

American college football season

2008 Wake Forest Demon Deacons football

EagleBank Bowl champion

EagleBank Bowl, W 29–19 vs. Navy
- Conference: Atlantic Coast Conference
- Atlantic Division
- Record: 8–5 (4–4 ACC)
- Head coach: Jim Grobe (8th season)
- Offensive coordinator: Steed Lobotzke (6th season)
- Offensive scheme: Spread
- Defensive coordinator: Brad Lambert (1st season)
- Base defense: 4–3
- Captain: Game captains
- Home stadium: BB&T Field

2008 Atlantic Coast Conference football standings
| | Conf. | | | Overall |
| Team | W | | L | W | | L |
|---|---|---|---|---|---|---|
Atlantic Division
| Boston College xy | 5 | – | 3 | 9 | – | 5 |
| No. 21 Florida State x | 5 | – | 3 | 9 | – | 4 |
| Maryland | 4 | – | 4 | 8 | – | 5 |
| Wake Forest | 4 | – | 4 | 8 | – | 5 |
| Clemson | 4 | – | 4 | 7 | – | 6 |
| NC State | 4 | – | 4 | 6 | – | 7 |
Coastal Division
| No. 15 Virginia Tech xy$ | 5 | – | 3 | 10 | – | 4 |
| No. 22 Georgia Tech x | 5 | – | 3 | 9 | – | 4 |
| North Carolina | 0 | – | 4 | 0 | – | 5 |
| Miami (FL) | 4 | – | 4 | 7 | – | 6 |
| Virginia | 3 | – | 5 | 5 | – | 7 |
| Duke | 1 | – | 7 | 4 | – | 8 |
Championship: Virginia Tech 30, Boston College 12
$ – BCS representative as conference champion; x – Division champion/co-champions; y – Championship game participant; North Carolina vacated 8 wins, including 4 ACC wins; Rankings from AP Poll

The 2008 Wake Forest Demon Deacons football team represented Wake Forest University during the 2008 NCAA Division I FBS football season. It was Wake Forest's 56th season as a member of the Atlantic Coast Conference (ACC).

The Demon Deacons were led by eighth-year head coach Jim Grobe. Wake Forest played its home games at BB&T Field. The Deacons began their season on August 28 at Baylor. A win in the 2007 Meineke Car Care Bowl against UConn gave the Deacons twenty wins over the last two seasons.

The team is finished 8–5 overall and 4–4 in ACC play, and beat Navy in the inaugural EagleBank Bowl on December 20.

== Before the season ==
=== Roster changes ===
Quarterback Zach MacDowell enrolled Coastal Carolina University in January, and will play there starting in 2008.
Running back Lucas Caparelli was dismissed from the university after an off the field incident in January.

=== Recruiting ===
On National Signing Day, the Demon Deacons received letters of intent from 17 players.

- Andrew Parker TE 6–5 225 Jacksonville, Florida Bartram Trail
- Terence Davis WR 6–1 180 Lilburn, Georgia Brookwood
- Gabe Irby OL 6–3 315 Mt. Airy, Georgia Habersham Central
- Ted Stachitas QB 6–3 185 Ponte Vedra Beach, Florida Nease
- Derricus Ellis DE 6–2 225 Rome, Georgia Darlington School
- Joey Ehrmann LB 6–4 210 Baltimore, Maryland Gilman
- Ramon Booi DL 6–6 330 Jacksonville, Florida Nease
- Scott Betros LB 6–1 220 Jacksonville, Florida Bolles School
- Riley Haynes LB 6–1 225 Jacksonville, Florida Nease
- Kevin Smith DE 6–4 210 Plano, Texas East
- Lovell Jackson RB 5–10 170 Tampa, Florida Plant
- Garrick Williams OL 6–4 314 Columbia, Missouri Rock Bridge
- J.T. Dixon TE 6–4 230 Chandler, Arizona Hargrave Military
- Chance Raines OL 6–2 270 Jacksonville, Florida Bolles School
- Joe Looney OL 6–3 315 Lake Worth, Florida Lake Worth
- Kenny Okoro CB 6–0 185 Greensboro, North Carolina Dudley
- Chris Givens RB 6–0 200 Wylie, Texas Wylie

== Schedule ==
| Date | Time | Opponent | Rank | Site | TV | Result | Attendance |
|---|---|---|---|---|---|---|---|
| August 28 | 8:00 pm | at Baylor* | No. 23 | Floyd Casey Stadium; Waco, TX | FSN | W 41–13 | 30,633 |
| September 6 | 3:30 pm | Ole Miss* | No. 20 | BB&T Field; Winston-Salem, NC | ABC/ESPN2 | W 30–28 | 31,986 |
| September 20 | 7:00 pm | at No. 25 Florida State | No. 18 | Doak Campbell Stadium; Tallahassee, FL | ESPN2 | W 12–3 | 79,235 |
| September 27 | 3:45 pm | Navy* | No. 15 | BB&T Field; Winston-Salem, NC | ESPNU | L 17–24 | 33,173 |
| October 9 | 7:30 pm | Clemson | No. 21 | BB&T Field; Winston-Salem, NC | ESPN | W 12–7 | 33,988 |
| October 18 | 12:00 pm | at Maryland | No. 19 | Byrd Stadium; College Park, MD | Raycom | L 0–26 | 46,257 |
| October 25 | 12:00 pm | at Miami | | Dolphin Stadium; Miami Gardens, FL | ESPNU | L 10–16 | 41,208 |
| November 1 | 3:30 pm | Duke | | BB&T Field; Winston-Salem, NC (rivalry) | ESPN360 | W 33–30 ^{OT} | 32,226 |
| November 8 | 3:30 pm | Virginia^{†} | | BB&T Field; Winston-Salem, NC | ESPNU | W 28–17 | 34,014 |
| November 15 | 3:30 pm | at North Carolina State | | Carter–Finley Stadium; Raleigh, NC (rivalry) | ESPNU | L 17–21 | 56,174 |
| November 22 | 3:30 pm | No. 25 Boston College | | BB&T Field; Winston-Salem, NC | ABC/ESPN2 | L 21–24 | 30,373 |
| November 29 | 7:00 pm | Vanderbilt* | | BB&T Field; Winston-Salem, NC | ESPNU | W 23–10 | 25,902 |
| December 20 | 11:00 am | vs. Navy* | | RFK Stadium; Washington, D.C. (EagleBank Bowl) | ESPN | W 29–19 | 28,777 |
*Non-conference game; ^{†}Homecoming; Rankings from Coaches' Poll released prior to the game; All times are in Eastern time

== Roster ==
| **Bold indicates started last game** **Quarterbacks**: 6 Brett Hodges – (redshirt) Junior; 10 Christian Hartford – Freshman; **11 Riley Skinner** – (redshirt) Junior; 12 Skylar Jones – (redshirt) Freshman; 13 Ted Stachitas – Freshman; 15 Ryan McManus – Senior; 32 Turner Faulk – Freshman; **Running backs**: 14 CJ Washington – (redshirt) Freshman; 20 Lovell Jackson – Freshman; 22 Brandon Pendergrass – (redshirt) Freshman; 27 Josh Adams – (redshirt) Sophomore; 34 Willie Dixon – (redshirt) Freshman; **Wide receivers**: 3 Devon Brown – (redshirt) Freshman; **4 D.J. Boldin** – (redshirt) Senior; 7 Jordan Williams – Sophomore; 8 Marshall Williams – (redshirt) Sophomore; 17 Christopher Langley – Junior; 18 Danny Dembry – (redshirt) Freshman; 21 Andrew Wright – Junior; 36 Casey Hill – (redshirt) Junior; 81 Terence Davis – Freshman; 82 Chris Givens – Freshman; 86 Matt Hartford – Junior; **88 Chip Brinkman** – (redshirt) Senior; **Fullbacks**: **23 Kevin Harris** – (redshirt) Junior; 35 Rich Belton – (redshirt) Senior; **44 Mike Rinfrette** – (redshirt) Junior; 48 Anthony Williams – Junior; **Tight ends**: **80 Andrew Parker** – Freshman; 83 Cameron Ford – (redshirt) Freshman; 84 J.T. Dixon – Freshman; 85 Ben Wooster – (redshirt) Junior; 89 Kenneth Coe – Sophomore | **Offensive Linemen**: 61 Barrett McMillin – (redshirt) Junior; **62 Doug Weaver** – (redshirt) Freshman; **64 Jeff Griffin** – (redshirt) Junior; 65 Gage Crews – (redshirt) Junior; 66 Chance Raines – Freshman; 67 Trey Bailey – (redshirt) Junior; 69 Dennis Godfrey – (redshirt) Freshman; 71 Ryan Britt – (redshirt) Freshman; **72 Russell Nenon** – (redshirt) Sophomore; 74 Garrick Williams – Freshman; 75 Michael Hoag – (redshirt) Freshman; **76 Joe Birdsong** – (redshirt) Junior; 77 Boomer Peterson – (redshirt) Junior; **78 Joe Looney** – Freshman; 79 Gabe Irby – Freshman; **Linebackers**: 26 Jonathon Jones – (redshirt) Junior; 32 Scott Betros – Freshman; 35 Lee Malchow – Junior; **39 Chantz McClinic** – (redshirt) Senior; 40 Kyle Jarrett – (redshirt) Freshman; 41 Michael Potteiger – Junior; **43 Stanley Arnoux** – (redshirt) Senior; 45 Riley Haynes – Freshman; 46 Matt Woodlief – (redshirt) Sophomore; 50 Joey Ehrmann – Freshman; 52 Dominique Midgett – (redshirt) Junior; 54 Collin Granger – (redshirt) Freshman; 55 Tristan Dorty – (redshirt) Freshman; 56 Hunter Haynes – (redshirt) Sophomore; 57 Gelo Orange – (redshirt) Freshman; **59 Aaron Curry** – (redshirt) Senior; 60 Barrett Powell – Freshman; 63 Andrew Conroy – Senior; **Cornerbacks**: **2 Alphonso Smith** – (redshirt) Senior; 5 Marcus Williams – (redshirt) Sophomore; 6 Kenny Okoro – Freshman; **17 Brandon Ghee** – (redshirt) Junior; 24 Michael Williams – (redshirt) Freshman; 25 Josh Bush – (redshirt) Freshman; 29 Kerry Major – (redshirt) Senior; 37 Morgan Harris – Freshman | **Safeties**: 8 Geoff Wissing – Junior; **9 Chip Vaughn** – (redshirt) Senior; **10 Kevin Patterson** – (redshirt) Senior; 21 Alex Frye – (redshirt) Sophomore; 28 Cyhl Quarles – (redshirt) Freshman; 30 John Stamper – (redshirt) Freshman; 36 Peter Grimm – (redshirt) Freshman; 37 Junior Petit-Jean – (redshirt) Freshman; **Defensive ends**: 34 Antonio Wilson – (redshirt) Senior; **42 Matt Robinson** – (redshirt) Senior; 53 Joe Hall – (redshirt) Freshman; 54 Derricus Ellis – Freshman; 90 Will Wright – (redshirt) Freshman; 91 Kevin Smith – Freshman; 93 Anthony Davis – (redshirt) Senior; 94 Tripp Russell – (redshirt) Sophomore; **97 Kyle Wilber** – (redshirt) Freshman; 99 Michael Lockett – (redshirt) Junior; **Defensive tackles**: **51 John Russell** – (redshirt) Junior; 58 Michael Carter – (redshirt) Sophomore; 87 Ted Randolph – (redshirt) Junior; 92 Bryson Dunmeyer – Freshman; 95 Ramon Booi – Freshman; **96 Boo Robinson** – (redshirt) Junior; **Kickers**: 14 Shane Popham – (redshirt) Freshman; 21 Andrew Wright – Junior; 38 Sam Swank – (redshirt) Senior; **Punters**: 14 Shane Popham – (redshirt) Freshman; 38 Sam Swank – (redshirt) Senior; **Long Snappers**: 53 Greg Bechtel – Junior; 54 Collin Granger – (redshirt) Freshman; **Kick returners**: 2 Alphonso Smith – (redshirt) Senior; 3 Devon Brown – (redshirt) Freshman; 21 Alex Frye – (redshirt) Sophomore; **Punt Returners**: 2 Alphonso Smith – (redshirt) Senior |

== Coaching staff ==
After the 2007 season, The Deacons had two assistant coaches accept other coaching positions. Defensive coordinator Dean Hood accepted the head coaching job at Eastern Kentucky. Quarterbacks coach Jeff Mullen left the Deacons to assume the Offensive coordinator position at West Virginia.

| Position | Name | First year at WFU |
|---|---|---|
| Head coach | Jim Grobe | 2001 |
| Secondary | Tim Billings | 2006 |
| Quarterbacks | Tom Elrod | 2003 |
| Defensive ends | Keith Henry | 2001 |
| Defensive coordinator | Brad Lambert | 2001 |
| Offensive coordinator / Offensive line | Steed Lobotzke | 2001 |
| Defensive tackles | Ray McCartney | 2001 |
| Assistant head coach / Running backs / Kickers | Billy Mitchell | 2001 |
| Tight Ends / Fullbacks | Steve Russ | 2008 |
| Wide Receivers | Brian Knorr | 2008 |

== Game summaries ==
=== @ Baylor ===
| | 1 | 2 | 3 | 4 | Total |
|---|---|---|---|---|---|
| Demon Deacons | 10 | 10 | 14 | 7 | 41 |
| Bears | 0 | 6 | 0 | 7 | 13 |

In front of a national television audience, Riley Skinner threw for three touchdowns, including two to Chip Brinkman. Josh Adams and Brandon Pendergrass added touchdown runs in a lopsided 41–13 scoreline. Alphonso Smith and Alex Frye notched interceptions for the Deacons, who won their first ever game in the state of Texas.

=== Ole Miss ===
| | 1 | 2 | 3 | 4 | Total |
|---|---|---|---|---|---|
| Rebels | 7 | 7 | 0 | 14 | 28 |
| Demon Deacons | 7 | 3 | 10 | 10 | 30 |

Sam Swank's 42 yd FG with three seconds remaining gave Wake Forest a thrilling 30–28 win over Ole Miss. In a game with several lead changes, Ole Miss took the lead with just over one minute remaining in the fourth quarter. Wake quarterback Riley Skinner led the Deacons down the field in 53 seconds to set up Swank's game-winning field goal.

=== @ Florida State ===
| | 1 | 2 | 3 | 4 | Total |
|---|---|---|---|---|---|
| Demon Deacons | 3 | 0 | 6 | 3 | 12 |
| Seminoles | 0 | 0 | 3 | 0 | 3 |

In a game that featured no touchdowns, Sam Swank made four field goals to lead the Demon Deacons to a 12–3 win in Tallahassee. The win was the Deacons' second consecutive win in Tallahassee, and the third straight overall over the Seminoles. The Wake Forest defense was stout, allowing Florida State under 250 yards of offense, and forcing seven turnovers, including five interceptions.

=== Navy ===
| | 1 | 2 | 3 | 4 | Total |
|---|---|---|---|---|---|
| Midshipmen | 7 | 10 | 0 | 7 | 24 |
| Demon Deacons | 0 | 0 | 10 | 7 | 17 |

Eric Kettani ran for a career-high 175 yards and backup quarterback Jarod Bryant scored the decisive touchdown in the fourth quarter, as Navy came into Winston-Salem and upset Wake Forest 24–17.

=== Clemson ===
| | 1 | 2 | 3 | 4 | Total |
|---|---|---|---|---|---|
| Tigers | 0 | 0 | 7 | 0 | 7 |
| Demon Deacons | 3 | 0 | 0 | 9 | 12 |

Riley Skinner's 7-yard touchdown pass to DJ Boldin with 5:28 to go gave the Deacons a 12–7 win against Clemson. In a defensive battle, the Deacons' defense managed to hold Clemson to less than one yard per carry. Wake Forest dominated the game statistically but were unable to capitalize on several scoring chances. The sole turnover in the game was a Cullen Harper pass intercepted by Alphonso Smith, who tied a school record with his 17th career interception. Riley Skinner also threw for 186 yards and a touchdown on 22-of-34 passing, and also added 73 yards on the ground.

=== @ Maryland ===
| | 1 | 2 | 3 | 4 | Total |
|---|---|---|---|---|---|
| Demon Deacons | 0 | 0 | 0 | 0 | 0 |
| Terrapins | 7 | 6 | 6 | 7 | 26 |

Chris Turner completed 28-of-41 passes for 321 yards and a touchdown, and Maryland knocked off another top-25 team with a 26–0 thumping of No. 21 Wake Forest.

=== @ Miami ===
| | 1 | 2 | 3 | 4 | Total |
|---|---|---|---|---|---|
| Demon Deacons | 7 | 3 | 0 | 0 | 10 |
| Hurricanes | 3 | 0 | 10 | 3 | 16 |

Wake Forest was not able to maintain a halftime lead in falling against Miami. The Deacons were unable to mount much offense in the second half, and a Robert Marve QB sneak in the third quarter ended up being the game-winner. Fullback Mike Rinfrette scored the lone Deacons touchdown on a one-yard run on Wake's first offensive series.

=== Duke ===
| | 1 | 2 | 3 | 4 | OT | Total |
|---|---|---|---|---|---|---|
| Blue Devils | 7 | 0 | 13 | 10 | 0 | 30 |
| Demon Deacons | 9 | 3 | 10 | 8 | 3 | 33 |

In a back and forth affair, Wake Forest held off Duke 33–30 in an overtime battle. Alphonso Smith blocked a punt for a safety and had two interceptions for the Deacons, including one in overtime to end the game. Riley Skinner had a touchdown pass to DJ Boldin, and also scored on a quarterback sneak. The Blue Devils had their chance to win at the end of regulation, but missed a 42-yard field goal that would have won it. Aaron Curry led the Deacons with 16 tackles.

=== Virginia ===
| | 1 | 2 | 3 | 4 | Total |
|---|---|---|---|---|---|
| Cavaliers | 0 | 3 | 0 | 14 | 17 |
| Demon Deacons | 14 | 14 | 0 | 0 | 28 |

On homecoming weekend in Winston-Salem, the Demon Deacons dazzled fans en route to a 28–3 halftime advantage. Riley Skinner threw two touchdown passes in the first half, including a 58-yard strike to Devon Brown. Kevin Patterson gave the Wake defense their first touchdown of the season, as e brought back a UVA pass for a 53-yard touchdown. Wake Forest turned more conservative in the second half, and allowed UVA to pick up a pair of fourth-quarter touchdowns, but the lead was safe, and the Deacons claimed bowl eligibility for the third consecutive season.

=== @ NC State ===
| | 1 | 2 | 3 | 4 | Total |
|---|---|---|---|---|---|
| Demon Deacons | 7 | 7 | 3 | 0 | 17 |
| Wolfpack | 7 | 7 | 0 | 7 | 21 |

Russell Wilson threw the game-winning touchdown to Anthony Hill will ten minutes remaining, and NC State held off Wake Forest 21–17 in Raleigh. DJ Boldin had a hand in both Wake touchdowns, throwing a pass to Marshall Williams for a 64-yard touchdown, and catching a 7 yarder of his own. Williams had his first career 100 yard receiving day, grabbing 7 balls for 116 yards.

=== Boston College ===
| | 1 | 2 | 3 | 4 | Total |
|---|---|---|---|---|---|
| Eagles | 3 | 13 | 0 | 8 | 24 |
| Demon Deacons | 0 | 7 | 7 | 7 | 21 |

Backup quarterback Dominique Davis scored on a one-yard quarterback sneak in the final minutes to send Wake Forest to their second straight close defeat. In a defensive battle, the Demon Deacon defense scored two touchdowns, and a punt block set up the third. Kevin Patterson and Kyle Wilbur returned fumbles for touchdowns, and Rich Belton caught a 1-yard touchdown pass from Riley Skinner. This game also saw the return of kicker Sam Swank, who missed several weeks with injury.

=== Vanderbilt ===
| | 1 | 2 | 3 | 4 | Total |
|---|---|---|---|---|---|
| Commodores | 3 | 0 | 0 | 7 | 10 |
| Demon Deacons | 3 | 7 | 7 | 6 | 23 |

Three different Deacons ran for touchdowns as Wake held off Vanderbilt 23–10 in each team's regular season finale. Brandon Pendergrass, Kevin Harris, and Rich Belton got in the endzone, and Alphonso Smith tied the ACC record for career interceptions. The win guaranteed Wake Forest their third consecutive winning season.

=== Vs. Navy–EagleBank Bowl ===
| | 1 | 2 | 3 | 4 | Total |
|---|---|---|---|---|---|
| Demon Deacons | 0 | 7 | 7 | 15 | 29 |
| Midshipmen | 10 | 3 | 0 | 6 | 19 |

Wake Forest scored 29 points in the last 31 minutes of action to win the inaugural EagleBank Bowl, and took revenge on Navy for a regular season defeat. Josh Adams got in the end zone twice for Wake Forest, who also got touchdowns from Ben Wooster and Rich Belton. Alphonso Smith intercepted a second quarter pass to break Dre Bly's ACC record for career interceptions. The Deacons outrushed the potent Navy option attack, led by a career-high 136 yards from Kevin Harris, and Riley Skinner set a FBS bowl record by completing eleven passes without an incompletion.

== Postseason ==
=== Conference ===
- All-ACC First Team

DJ Boldin (WR)
Aaron Curry (LB)
Alphonso Smith (CB)

- All-ACC Honorable Mention

Boo Robinson (DE)
Riley Skinner (QB)

=== National ===
- Aaron Curry (LB)- 2008 Butkus Award Winner, 2nd Team AP All-American, 2nd Team Sporting News All-American, 2nd Team Rivals.com All-American
- Alphonso Smith (CB)- 1st Team AP All-American, 2nd Team Sporting News All-American, 2nd Team Rivals.com All-American

== Rankings ==
Ranking movements Legend: ██ Increase in ranking ██ Decrease in ranking — = Not ranked
| | Week | | | | | | | | | | | | | | | | |
| Poll | Pre | 1 | 2 | 3 | 4 | 5 | 6 | 7 | 8 | 9 | 10 | 11 | 12 | 13 | 14 | 15 | Final |
|---|---|---|---|---|---|---|---|---|---|---|---|---|---|---|---|---|---|
| AP | 23 | 20 | 20 | 18 | 16 | 25 | 21 | 21 | — | — | — | — | — | — | — | — | — |
| Coaches | 23 | 20 | 19 | 18 | 15 | 25 | 21 | 19 | — | — | — | — | — | — | — | — | — |
| Harris | Not released | | | | | 25 | 22 | 21 | — | — | — | — | — | — | — | — | Not released |
| BCS | Not released | | | | | | | | — | — | — | 24 | — | — | — | — | Not released |

== Scores by quarter ==
| | 1 | 2 | 3 | 4 | OT | Total |
|---|---|---|---|---|---|---|
| Wake Forest | 63 | 61 | 64 | 82 | 3 | 273 |
| Opponents | 54 | 55 | 39 | 90 | 0 | 238 |
