= List of Pittsburgh Panthers football seasons =

This is a list of Pittsburgh Panthers football seasons, national championships and quarterbacks. The Pittsburgh Panthers football team is the American football team of the University of Pittsburgh in Pittsburgh. The team competes in the NCAA Division I Football Bowl Subdivision. The Panthers have been members of the Atlantic Coast Conference since 2013. From 1991 to 2012 they were members of the Big East Conference. Before 1991 they competed as an independent.

The Panthers began play in 1890. In total, the University officially recognizes nine national championships. The university bases its claim for the five national championships from 1929 to 1937 on a 1967 article by Dan Jenkins of Sports Illustrated. The NCAA's record book lists Pittsburgh as being selected for a national championship by "major selectors" in eleven different seasons. Research by College Football Data Warehouse (CFBDW) has found that Pitt was selected as a national champion in 16 different seasons by at least one out of 80 selectors of titles. Of these, CFBDW names six as national championship seasons for the University of Pittsburgh.

== Season records ==
| Season | Record | | | | | | | Bowl Results | Awards | AP Rank | | National championships | | References |
| Season | Overall | | | Conference | | | | Bowl Results | Awards | AP Rank | | National championships | | References |
| Season | W | L | T | Membership | W | L | T | Bowl Results | Awards | Peak | Final | Selectors | Source | References |
|---|---|---|---|---|---|---|---|---|---|---|---|---|---|---|
| 1890 | 1 | 2 | 0 | | | | | | | | | | | |
| 1891 | 2 | 5 | 0 | | | | | | | | | | | |
| 1892 | 4 | 2 | 0 | | | | | | | | | | | |
| 1893 | 1 | 4 | 0 | | | | | | | | | | | |
| 1894 | 1 | 1 | 0 | | | | | | | | | | | |
| 1895 | 1 | 6 | 0 | | | | | | | | | | | |
| 1896 | 3 | 6 | 0 | | | | | | | | | | | |
| 1897 | 1 | 3 | 0 | | | | | | | | | | | |
| 1898 | 5 | 2 | 1 | | | | | | | | | | | |
| 1899 | 3 | 1 | 1 | | | | | | | | | | | |
| 1900 | 5 | 4 | 0 | | | | | | | | | | | |
| 1901 | 7 | 2 | 1 | | | | | | | | | | | |
| 1902 | 5 | 6 | 1 | | | | | | | | | | | |
| 1903 | 1 | 8 | 1 | | | | | | | | | | | |
| 1904 | 10 | 0 | 0 | | | | | | | | | | | |
| 1905 | 10 | 2 | 0 | | | | | | | | | | | |
| 1906 | 4 | 6 | 0 | | | | | | | | | | | |
| 1907 | 9 | 1 | 0 | | | | | | | | | | | |
| 1908 | 8 | 3 | 0 | | | | | | | | | | | |
| 1909 | 6 | 2 | 1 | | | | | | | | | | | |
| 1910 | 9 | 0 | 0 | | | | | | | | | NCF | CFBDW, NCAA | |
| 1911 | 4 | 3 | 1 | | | | | | | | | | | |
| 1912 | 3 | 6 | 0 | | | | | | | | | | | |
| 1913 | 6 | 2 | 1 | | | | | | | | | | | |
| 1914 | 8 | 1 | 0 | | | | | | | | | | | |
| 1915 | 8 | 0 | 0 | | | | | | | | | PD | NCAA, Pitt | |
| 1916 | 8 | 0 | 0 | | | | | | | | | BR, HAF, HS, NCF, PD | CFBDW, NCAA, Pitt | |
| 1917 | 9 | 0 | 0 | | | | | | | | | | | |
| 1918 | 4 | 1 | 0 | | | | | | | | | HAF, HS, NCF | CFBDW, NCAA, Pitt | |
| 1919 | 6 | 2 | 1 | | | | | | | | | | | |
| 1920 | 6 | 0 | 2 | | | | | | | | | | | |
| 1921 | 5 | 3 | 1 | | | | | | | | | | | |
| 1922 | 8 | 2 | 0 | | | | | | | | | | | |
| 1923 | 5 | 4 | 0 | | | | | | | | | | | |
| 1924 | 5 | 3 | 1 | | | | | | | | | | | |
| 1925 | 8 | 1 | 0 | | | | | | | | | | | |
| 1926 | 5 | 2 | 2 | | | | | | | | | | | |
| 1927 | 8 | 1 | 1 | | | | | L Rose Bowl | | | | | | |
| 1928 | 6 | 2 | 1 | | | | | | | | | | | |
| 1929 | 9 | 1 | 0 | | | | | L Rose Bowl | | | | PD | NCAA, Pitt | |
| 1930 | 6 | 2 | 1 | | | | | | | | | | | |
| 1931 | 8 | 1 | 0 | | | | | | | | | PD | NCAA, Pitt | |
| 1932 | 8 | 1 | 2 | | | | | L Rose Bowl | | | | | | |
| 1933 | 8 | 1 | 0 | | | | | | | | | | | |
| 1934 | 8 | 1 | 0 | | | | | | | | | PD | Pitt | |
| 1935 | 7 | 1 | 2 | | | | | | | | | | | |
| 1936 | 8 | 1 | 1 | | | | | W Rose Bowl | | #2 | #3 | BS, CFRA, HS | CFBDW, NCAA, Pitt | |
| 1937 | 9 | 0 | 1 | | | | | | | #1 | #1 | AP, BR, BS, CFRA, DiS, HS, L, NCF, PS, SR, WS | CFBDW, NCAA, Pitt | |
| 1938 | 8 | 2 | 0 | | | | | | | #1 | #8 | | | |
| 1939 | 5 | 4 | 0 | | | | | | | #1 | – | | | |
| 1940 | 3 | 4 | 1 | | | | | | | – | – | | | |
| 1941 | 3 | 6 | 0 | | | | | | | – | – | | | |
| 1942 | 3 | 6 | 0 | | | | | | | – | – | | | |
| 1943 | 3 | 5 | 0 | | | | | | | – | – | | | |
| 1944 | 4 | 5 | 0 | | | | | | | – | – | | | |
| 1945 | 3 | 7 | 0 | | | | | | | – | – | | | |
| 1946 | 3 | 5 | 1 | | | | | | | – | – | | | |
| 1947 | 1 | 8 | 0 | | | | | | | – | – | | | |
| 1948 | 6 | 3 | 0 | | | | | | | – | – | | | |
| 1949 | 6 | 3 | 0 | | | | | | | #15 | – | | | |
| 1950 | 1 | 8 | 0 | | | | | | | – | – | | | |
| 1951 | 3 | 7 | 0 | | | | | | | – | – | | | |
| 1952 | 6 | 3 | 0 | | | | | | | #14 | – | | | |
| 1953 | 3 | 5 | 1 | | | | | | | #15 | – | | | |
| 1954 | 4 | 5 | 0 | | | | | | | #20 | – | | | |
| 1955 | 7 | 4 | 0 | | | | | L Sugar Bowl | | #7 | #11 | | | |
| 1956 | 7 | 3 | 1 | | | | | L Gator Bowl | | #7 | #13 | | | |
| 1957 | 4 | 6 | 0 | | | | | | | #16 | – | | | |
| 1958 | 5 | 4 | 1 | | | | | | | #7 | – | | | |
| 1959 | 6 | 4 | 0 | | | | | | | #16 | #20 | | | |
| 1960 | 4 | 3 | 3 | | | | | | | #12 | – | | | |
| 1961 | 3 | 7 | 0 | | | | | | | – | – | | | |
| 1962 | 5 | 5 | 0 | | | | | | | – | – | | | |
| 1963 | 9 | 1 | 0 | | | | | | | #3 | #4 | | | |
| 1964 | 3 | 5 | 2 | | | | | | | – | – | | | |
| 1965 | 3 | 7 | 0 | | | | | | | – | – | | | |
| 1966 | 1 | 9 | 0 | | | | | | | – | – | | | |
| 1967 | 1 | 9 | 0 | | | | | | | – | – | | | |
| 1968 | 1 | 9 | 0 | | | | | | | – | – | | | |
| 1969 | 4 | 6 | 0 | | | | | | | – | – | | | |
| 1970 | 5 | 5 | 0 | | | | | | | #15 | – | | | |
| 1971 | 3 | 8 | 0 | | | | | | | – | – | | | |
| 1972 | 1 | 10 | 0 | | | | | | | – | – | | | |
| 1973 | 6 | 5 | 1 | | | | | L Fiesta Bowl | | #20 | – | | | |
| 1974 | 7 | 4 | 0 | | | | | | | #8 | #20 | | | |
| 1975 | 8 | 4 | 0 | | | | | W Sun Bowl | | #15 | #15 | | | |
| 1976 | 12 | 0 | 0 | | | | | W Sugar Bowl | | #1 | #1 | AP, FN, FWAA, HAF, NCF, NFF, PS, R(FACT), SN, SR, UPI | CFBDW, NCAA, Pitt | |
| 1977 | 9 | 2 | 1 | | | | | W Gator Bowl | | #8 | #8 | | | |
| 1978 | 8 | 4 | 0 | | | | | L Tangerine Bowl | | #9 | – | | | |
| 1979 | 11 | 1 | 0 | | | | | W Fiesta Bowl | | #7 | #7 | | | |
| 1980 | 11 | 1 | 0 | | | | | W Gator Bowl | | #2 | #2 | CFRA, DeS, NYT, R(FACT), SR | NCAA | |
| 1981 | 11 | 1 | 0 | | | | | W Sugar Bowl | | #1 | #4 | NCF | NCAA | |
| 1982 | 9 | 3 | 0 | | | | | L Cotton Bowl Classic | | #1 | #10 | | | |
| 1983 | 8 | 3 | 1 | | | | | L Fiesta Bowl | | #15 | #18 | | | |
| 1984 | 3 | 7 | 1 | | | | | | | #17 | – | | | |
| 1985 | 5 | 5 | 1 | | | | | | | – | – | | | |
| 1986 | 6 | 4 | 1 | | | | | | | – | – | | | |
| 1987 | 8 | 4 | 0 | | | | | L Astro-Bluebonnet Bowl | | #16 | – | | | |
| 1988 | 6 | 5 | 0 | | | | | | | #16 | – | | | |
| 1989 | 8 | 3 | 1 | | | | | W John Hancock Bowl | | #7 | #17 | | | |
| 1990 | 3 | 7 | 1 | | | | | | | #13 | – | | | |
| 1991 | 6 | 5 | 0 | Big East | 3 | 2 | 0 | | | #12 | – | | | |
| 1992 | 3 | 9 | 0 | Big East | 1 | 3 | 0 | | | – | – | | | |
| 1993 | 3 | 8 | 0 | Big East | 2 | 5 | 0 | | | – | – | | | |
| 1994 | 3 | 8 | 0 | Big East | 2 | 5 | 0 | | | – | – | | | |
| 1995 | 2 | 9 | 0 | Big East | 0 | 7 | 0 | | | – | – | | | |
| 1996 | 4 | 7 | | Big East | 3 | 4 | | | | – | – | | | |
| 1997 | 6 | 6 | | Big East | 4 | 3 | | L Liberty Bowl | | – | – | | | |
| 1998 | 2 | 9 | | Big East | 0 | 7 | | | | – | – | | | |
| 1999 | 5 | 6 | | Big East | 2 | 5 | | | | – | – | | | |
| 2000 | 7 | 5 | | Big East | 4 | 3 | | L Insight.com Bowl | | – | – | | | |
| 2001 | 7 | 5 | | Big East | 4 | 3 | | W Tangerine Bowl | | – | – | | | |
| 2002 | 9 | 4 | | Big East | 5 | 2 | | W Insight Bowl | | #17 | #19 | | | |
| 2003 | 8 | 5 | | Big East | 5 | 2 | | L Continental Tire Bowl | | #9 | – | | | |
| 2004 | 8 | 4 | | Big East | 4 | 2 | | L Fiesta Bowl | | #19 | #25 | | | |
| 2005 | 5 | 6 | | Big East | 4 | 3 | | | | #21 | – | | | |
| 2006 | 6 | 6 | | Big East | 2 | 5 | | | | – | – | | | |
| 2007 | 5 | 7 | | Big East | 3 | 4 | | | | – | – | | | |
| 2008 | 9 | 4 | | Big East | 5 | 2 | | L Sun Bowl | | #17 | – | | | |
| 2009 | 10 | 3 | | Big East | 5 | 2 | | W Meineke Car Care Bowl | | #8 | #15 | | | |
| 2010 | 8 | 5 | | Big East | 5 | 2 | | W BBVA Compass Bowl | | #15 | – | | | |
| 2011 | 6 | 7 | | Big East | 4 | 3 | | L BBVA Compass Bowl | | – | – | | | |
| 2012 | 6 | 7 | | Big East | 3 | 4 | | L BBVA Compass Bowl | | – | – | | | |
| 2013 | 7 | 6 | | ACC | 3 | 5 | | W Little Caesars Pizza Bowl | | – | – | | | |
| 2014 | 6 | 7 | | ACC | 4 | 4 | | L Armed Forces Bowl | | – | – | | | |
| 2015 | 8 | 5 | | ACC | 6 | 2 | | L Military Bowl | | #23 | – | | | |
| 2016 | 8 | 5 | | ACC | 5 | 3 | | L Pinstripe Bowl | | #22 | – | | | |
| 2017 | 5 | 7 | | ACC | 3 | 5 | | | | – | – | | | |
| 2018 | 7 | 7 | | ACC | 6 | 2 | | L Sun Bowl | | #24 | – | | | |
| 2019 | 8 | 5 | | ACC | 4 | 4 | | W Quick Lane Bowl | | – | – | | | |
| 2020 | 6 | 5 | | ACC | 5 | 5 | | | | #21 | – | | | |
| 2021 | 11 | 3 | | ACC | 7 | 1 | | L Peach Bowl | | #13 | #13 | | | |
| 2022 | 9 | 4 | | ACC | 5 | 3 | | W Sun Bowl | | #17 | #22 | | | |
| 2023 | 3 | 9 | | ACC | 2 | 6 | | | | – | – | | | |
| 2024 | 7 | 6 | | ACC | 3 | 5 | | L GameAbove Sports Bowl | | #19 | – | | | |
| 2025 | 8 | 5 | | ACC | 6 | 2 | | L Military Bowl | | #23 | – | | | |
| 2026 | 6 | 3 | | ACC | 3 | 3 | | TBD | | #25 | – | | | |

=== Legend ===
| CFBDW recognized National Championships | NCAA record book listed & Pitt claimed National Championships | National Championship listed in the NCAA record book but not claimed by Pitt | National Championship claimed by Pitt but not listed in the NCAA record book | Big East Conference Championship (1991–2012) | ACC Coastal Division Championship (2013–2019, 2021–2022); ACC Conference Championship Game Appearance (2020, 2023–present) | ACC Conference Championship (2013–present) | Undefeated Season |

Polls have been the most prominent form of championship selection since the inception of the AP Poll in 1936. The following systems have at one point in their history have named Pitt as a national champion or are still active today. Retroactive designations are marked in italics.

| Selector | Name | Years | Selector | Name | Years |
| Mathematical | | | Poll | | |
|---|---|---|---|---|---|
| BCS^{*} | Bowl Championship Series | 1998–2013 | AP | Associated Press | 1936–present |
| BR | Billingsley Report | 1869–1870, 1872–1969, 1970–2006 | CFRA | College Football Researchers Association | 1919–1935, 1936–1981, 1982–1992 |
| BS | Boand System | 1919–1929, 1930–1960 | FN | Football News | 1958–2002 |
| CCR | Congrove Computer Rankings | 1993–Present | FWAA | Football Writers Association of America | 1954–present |
| DeS | DeVold System | 1939–1944, 1945–2006 | HAF | Helms Athletic Foundation | 1883–1935, 1936–1940, 1941–1982 |
| DiS | Dickinson System | 1924–1925, 1926–1940 | NCF | National Championship Foundation | 1869–1870, 1872–1935, 1936–1979, 1980–2000 |
| HS | Houlgate System | 1885, 1887–1905, 1907–1926, 1927–1949 | NFF^{†} | National Football Foundation | 1959–1990, 1995–present |
| L | Litkenhous | 1934–1972, 1974, 1978, 1981–1984 | SN | Sporting News | 1975–2006 |
| NYT | New York Times | 1979–2004 | UPI^{*} | United Press International | 1950–1990, 1993–1995 |
| PS | Poling System | 1924–1934, 1935–1955, 1957–1984 | USAT^{*†‡} | USA Today | 2006–present |
| R(FACT) | Rothman (FACT) | 1968–2006 | * The USA Today (USAT) Coaches' Poll is used as part of the BCS formula. † The NFF merged with UPI from 1991–1992 and was known as the UPI/NFF. Prior to 1991 the UPI had published the Coaches' Poll, which has been published by USA Today under various names and sponsorships since 1991. ‡ The USA Today Poll was sponsored by CNN from 1982–1996, known as CNN/USA Today, and ESPN from 1997–2005, known as the ESPN/USA Today. The NFF briefly merged with USA Today poll from 1993–1994 and was known as the USAT/NFF. | | |
| SR | Sagarin Ratings | 1919–1977, 1978–2006 | | | |
| WS | Williamson System | 1931, 1932–1963 | | | |
Research
| PD | Parke H. Davis | 1869–1870, 1872–1909, 1911–1916, 1919–1932, 1933 | | | |

== National championships ==
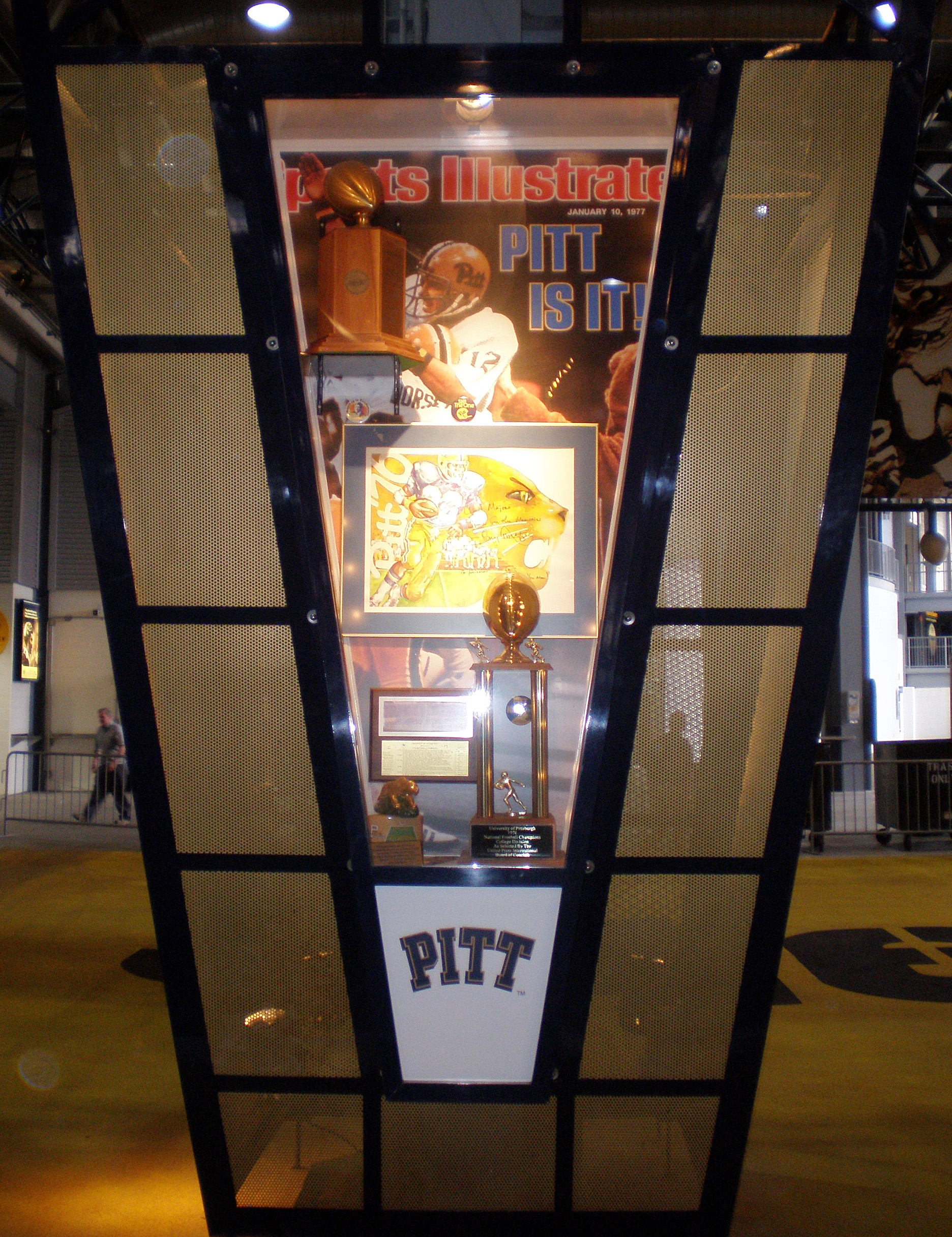
Kiosk in the Great Hall at Heinz Field celebrating Pitt's 1976 national championship

The University of Pittsburgh claims nine national championships for the Panthers football team: four that are mostly unanimous, (1916, 1918, 1937, and 1976) and five shared titles (1915, 1929, 1931, 1934, 1936). Parke Davis was the only major selector of four of the titles, including the 1934 selection attributed to him after his pre-season death.

The University bases its claim for the first eight national championships on a 1967 article by Dan Jenkins of Sports Illustrated. These championships, together with its unanimous championship of 1976, are the basis for the university's claim of nine national championship seasons.

Furthermore, according to research conducted by the College Football Data Warehouse, in eight additional years at least one out of 80 selectors of national titles has declared Pitt as its national champion. Combined with the Sports Illustrated article, Pitt has been recognized as the national champion by at least one selector in 17 different seasons. According to the NCAA Division 1 Football Records Book, Pitt has been named a national champion by a "Major Selector" in 11 separate seasons.

Note: The table lists all known national championship selections for the University of Pittsburgh. The list of national championship selecting organizations choosing Pitt for any particular year is not necessarily comprehensive. For more information see College Football Data Warehouse Total National Championships. All selections for seasons before 1927 were made retrospectively, as were many later selections. Additional notations include the following:

Pitt: national championship selections are officially recognized by the University
NCAA: Selection as national champions by organizations designated as "Major Selectors" in the official NCAA football records book
CFBDW: Designation as "CFBDW Recognized National Champions" according to College Football Data Warehouse.

Pittsburgh Panthers national championships
| Season | Coach | Record | Selectors | Recognized |
| 1910 | Joseph H. Thompson | 9–0 | 1st-N-Goal; Century Football Index; Cliff Morgan; Mel Smith; National Championship Foundation^{*} Patrick Premo | NCAA; CFBDW |
| 1915 | Glenn Scobey Warner | 8–0 | Bill Libby; Jim Koger; Mel Smith; Parke H. Davis^{*} | NCAA; Pitt |
| 1916 | Glenn Scobey Warner | 8–0 | Billingsley Report^{*} Helms Athletic Foundation^{*} Houlgate System^{*} National Championship Foundation^{*} Parke Davis ^{*} 17 minor selectors | NCAA; Pitt; CFBDW |
| 1917 | GlennScobey Warner | 10–0 | Alexander Weyand; David Wilson; Earl Jessen; Jim Koger; Mel Smith; Nutshell Sports Football Ratings |
| 1918 | Glenn Scobey Warner | 4–1 | Helms Athletic Foundation^{*} Houlgate System^{*} National Championship Foundation^{*} 14 minor selectors | NCAA; Pitt; CFBDW |
| 1925 | Jock Sutherland | 8–1 | Soren Sorensen |
| 1927 | Jock Sutherland | 8–1–1 | Esso Gas |
| 1929 | Jock Sutherland | 9–1 | Parke H. Davis^{*} | NCAA; Pitt |
| 1931 | Jock Sutherland | 8–1 | 1st-N-Goal; Bob Kirlin; Parke H. Davis^{*} | NCAA; Pitt |
| 1933 | Jock Sutherland | 8–1 | Bob Kirlin |
| 1934 | Jock Sutherland | 8–1 | Parke H. Davis' successor | Pitt |
| 1936 | Jock Sutherland | 8–1–1 | 1st-N-Goal; Angelo Louisa; Boand System^{*} Bob Kirlin; College Football; Researchers Association^{*} Earl Jessen; Esso Gas; Houlgate System^{*} Jim Koger; Loren Maxwell; Patrick Premo | NCAA; Pitt; CFBDW |
| 1937 | Jock Sutherland | 9–0–1 | consensus (12 major selectors, 15 minor selectors) | NCAA; Pitt; CFBDW |
| 1938 | Jock Sutherland | 8–2 | Patrick Premo |
| 1976 | Johnny Majors | 12–0 | consensus (12 major selectors, 19 minor selectors) | NCAA; Pitt; CFBDW |
| 1980 | Jackie Sherrill | 11–1 | 1st-N-Goal; Angelo Louisa; ARGH Power Ratings; College Football Researchers Association^{*} Foundation for the Analysis of Competitions and Tournaments^{*} Harry DeVold^{*} James Howell; Jeff Self; New York Times^{*} Quality Champions; Sagarin Ratings^{*} Steve Eck; The Fleming System | NCAA |
| 1981 | Jackie Sherrill | 11–1 | Montgomery Full Season Championship; National Championship Foundation^{*} | NCAA |

^{*} NCAA-designated "major selector"

The following table summarizes the source and totals for Pitt's national championship seasons.

| Source | Championships | Years |
|---|---|---|
| AP/Coaches' Poll (1936–present) | Two | 1937, 1976 |
| CFBDW (recognized) | Six | 1910, 1916, 1918, 1936, 1937, 1976 |
| Sports Illustrated (1967 article) (Note: Based on a September 11, 1967 Sports Illustrated article.) | Eight | 1915, 1916, 1918, 1929, 1931, 1934, 1936, 1937 |
| NCAA ("major" selectors) | Eleven | 1910, 1915, 1916, 1918, 1929, 1931, 1936, 1937, 1976, 1980, 1981 |
| CFBDW (all) | Sixteen | 1910, 1915, 1916, 1917, 1918, 1925, 1927, 1929, 1931, 1933, 1936, 1937, 1938, 1976, 1980, 1981 |
| Total unique seasons | Seventeen | 1910, 1915, 1916, 1917, 1918, 1925, 1927, 1929, 1931, 1933, 1934, 1936, 1937, 1938, 1976, 1980, 1981 |
| Claimed by Pitt | Nine | 1915, 1916, 1918, 1929, 1931, 1934, 1936, 1937, 1976 |

== Quarterbacks ==
Pitt's season-by-season completion leaders at quarterback since 1974 are depicted in the following table.

Pittsburgh Panthers quarterbacks
| Season | 1st String QB/Completions | 2nd String QB/Completions | 3rd String QB/Completions |
| 2026 | Mason Heintschel / 98 | Holden Geriner / 77 | Corey Dailey / 17 |
| 2025 | Mason Heintschel / 176 | Eli Holstein / 77 | Cole Gonzales / 11 |
| 2024 | Eli Holstein / 180 | Nate Yarnell / 98 | David Lynch / 16 |
| 2023 | Christian Veilleux / 94 | Phil Jurkovec / 57 | Nate Yarnell / 41 |
| 2022 | Kedon Slovis / 184 | Nick Patti / 29 | Nate Yarnell / 10 |
| 2021 | Kenny Pickett / 334* | Nick Patti / 14 | Davis Beville / 17 |
| 2020 | Kenny Pickett / 203 | Nick Patti / 26 | Davis Beville / 5 |
| 2019 | Kenny Pickett / 289* | Nick Patti / 26 | |
| 2018 | Kenny Pickett / 180 | Jeff George Jr. / 1 | Ricky Town / 1 |
| 2017 | Max Browne / 96 | Ben DiNucci / 88 | Kenny Pickett / 39 |
| 2016 | Nathan Peterman / 185 | Ben DiNucci / 3 | |
| 2015 | Nathan Peterman / 193 | Chad Voytik / 16 | |
| 2014 | Chad Voytik / 176 | Trey Anderson / 11 | |
| 2013 | Tom Savage / 238 | Chad Voytik / 6 | |
| 2012 | Tino Sunseri / 256* | Trey Anderson / 2 | |
| 2011 | Tino Sunseri / 247* | Trey Anderson / 12 | |
| 2010 | Tino Sunseri / 223 | Pat Bostick / 7 | |
| 2009 | Bill Stull / 207 | Tino Sunseri / 10 | |
| 2008 | Bill Stull / 188 | Pat Bostick / 22 | Kevan Smith / 1 |
| 2007 | Pat Bostick / 155 | Kevan Smith / 36 | Bill Stull / 14 |
| 2006 | Tyler Palko / 220 | Bill Stull / 6 | |
| 2005 | Tyler Palko / 193 | Bill Stull / 1 | |
| 2004 | Tyler Palko / 230 | Joe Flacco / 1 | |
| 2003 | Rod Rutherford / 247* | Luke Getsy / 3 | |
| 2002 | Rod Rutherford / 192 | Tyler Palko / 2 | |
| 2001 | David Priestley / 165 | Rod Rutherford / 19 | |
| 2000 | John Turman / 128 | David Priestley / 57 | |
| 1999 | John Turman / 92 | David Priestley / 92 | |
| 1998 | Matt Lytle / 159 | Matt O'Connor / 14 | |
| 1997 | Pete Gonzalez / 198 | Matt Lytle / 5 | |
| 1996 | Matt Lytle / 105 | Pete Gonzalez / 30 | |
| 1995 | John Ryan / 115 | Matt Lytle / 37 | Pete Gonzalez / 30 |
| 1994 | John Ryan / 87 | Sean Fitzgerald / 79 | Pete Gonzalez / 4 |
| 1993 | John Ryan / 115 | Ken Ferguson / 9 | |
| 1992 | Alex Van Pelt / 245* | John Ryan / 21 | |
| 1991 | Alex Van Pelt / 227* | Ken Ferguson / 2 | |
| 1990 | Alex Van Pelt / 201 | Darnell Dickerson / 1 | |
| 1989 | Alex Van Pelt / 192 | Scott Stark / 4 | |
| 1988 | Darnell Dickerson / 104 | Larry Wanke / 8 | |
| 1987 | Sal Genilla / 80 | Darnell Dickerson / 35 | Larry Wanke / 13 |
| 1986 | John Congemi / 165 | Joe Felitskey / 36 | Sal Genilla / 8 |
| 1985 | John Congemi / 122 | Joe Felitskey / 4 | |
| 1984 | John Congemi / 93 | Chris Jelic / 44 | John Cummings / 12 |
| 1983 | John Congemi / 170 | Chris Jelic / 9 | John Cummings / 9 |
| 1982 | Dan Marino / 221 | Dan Daniels / 2 | |
| 1981 | Dan Marino / 226* | Dan Daniels / 1 | |
| 1980 | Dan Marino / 116 | Rick Trocano / 88 | |
| 1979 | Dan Marino / 130 | Rick Trocano / 74 | |
| 1978 | Rick Trocano / 138* | Larry Delaney / 18 | |
| 1977 | Matt Cavanaugh / 110* | Rick Trocano / 17 | |
| 1976 | Matt Cavanaugh / 65 | Thomas Yencic / 14 | |
| 1975 | Robert Haygood / 42 | Matt Cavanaugh / 30 | |
| 1974 | Bill Daniels / 71* | Bob Medwid / 14 | |

* Denotes setting of team single-season completion record
