= 2025 Military Bowl =

Postseason college football bowl game

2025 Go Bowling Military Bowl
- 16th Military Bowl
Pittsburgh Panthers	East Carolina Pirates
(8–4)	(8–4)
ACC	American
17	23
Head coach: Pat Narduzzi	Head coach: Blake Harrell
	1	2	3	4	Total
Pittsburgh	0	7	7	3	17
East Carolina	0	3	14	6	23
- Date: December 27, 2025
- Season: 2025
- Stadium: Navy–Marine Corps Memorial Stadium
- Location: Annapolis, Maryland
- MVP: Anthony Smith (WR, East Carolina)
- Favorite: Pittsburgh by 10.5
- Referee: Luke Richmond (Big 12)
- Attendance: 17,016

United States TV coverage
- Network: ESPN
- Announcers: Jay Alter (play-by-play), Rocky Boiman (analyst), and Madison Fitzpatrick (sideline)

The 2025 Military Bowl was a college football bowl game played on December 27, 2025, at Navy–Marine Corps Memorial Stadium located in Annapolis, Maryland. The 16th annual Military Bowl game started at approximately 11:00 a.m. EST and aired on ESPN. The Military Bowl was one of the 2025–26 bowl games concluding the 2025 FBS football season. The game was sponsored by GoBowling.com, a website operated by the Bowling Proprietors Association of America to promote bowling as a sport, and was officially known as the Go Bowling Military Bowl.

The 2025 Military Bowl featured the Pittsburgh Panthers (8–4) of the Atlantic Coast Conference and the East Carolina Pirates (8–4) of the American Conference. East Carolina beat Pittsburgh, 23–17.

== Teams ==
Based on conference tie-ins, the game was expected to feature teams from the American Conference, Atlantic Coast Conference (ACC), or FBS independent Notre Dame. The announced matchup featured East Carolina from the American Conference and Pitt from the ACC. This was the fifth meeting between Pitt and East Carolina; each team had won twice, with their most recent prior game being in 1992.

=== Pittsburgh Panthers ===
Pitt's record stood at 7–2 in early November and they were ranked as high as 22nd. They finished their regular season with three games against ranked opponents, and lost two of those contests, to Notre Dame and Miami (FL). The Panthers entered the Military Bowl with an 8–4 record.

=== East Carolina Pirates ===
East Carolina opened their season with three losses in their first six games. The Pirates then won five of their final six games and entered the Military Bowl with an 8–4 record.

== Game summary ==
2025 Go Bowling Military Bowl

Quarter	1	2	3	4	Total
Pittsburgh	0	7	7	3	17
East Carolina	0	3	14	6	23

at Navy–Marine Corps Memorial Stadium • Annapolis, Maryland

- Date: Saturday, December 27, 2025
- Game time: 11:00 a.m. EST
- Game weather: Cloudy • Temperature: 39 °F (4 °C) • Wind: 13 mph (21 km/h) north
- Game attendance: 17,016
- Referee: Luke Richmond
- TV announcers (ESPN): Jay Alter (play-by-play), Rocky Boiman (analyst), and Madison Fitzpatrick (sideline)
- Box score

=== Statistics ===
Statistics	PITT	ECU
First downs	24	11
Plays–yards	85–376	59–249
Rushes–yards	40–120	42–72
Passing yards	256	177
Passing: comp–att–int	25–40–1	8–17–0
Time of possession	33:05	26:55

Team	Category	Player	Statistics
Pittsburgh	Passing	Mason Heintschel	25/40, 256 yards, 1 TD, 1 INT
Pittsburgh	Rushing	Ja'Kyrian Turner	16 carries, 93 yards
Pittsburgh	Receiving	Justin Holmes	6 receptions, 100 yards
East Carolina	Passing	Chaston Ditta	8/17, 177 yards, 2 TD
East Carolina	Rushing	Marlon Gunn Jr.	18 carries, 50 yards
East Carolina	Receiving	Anthony Smith	4 receptions, 156 yards, 2 TD
