= Eli Holstein =

American football player (born 2004)

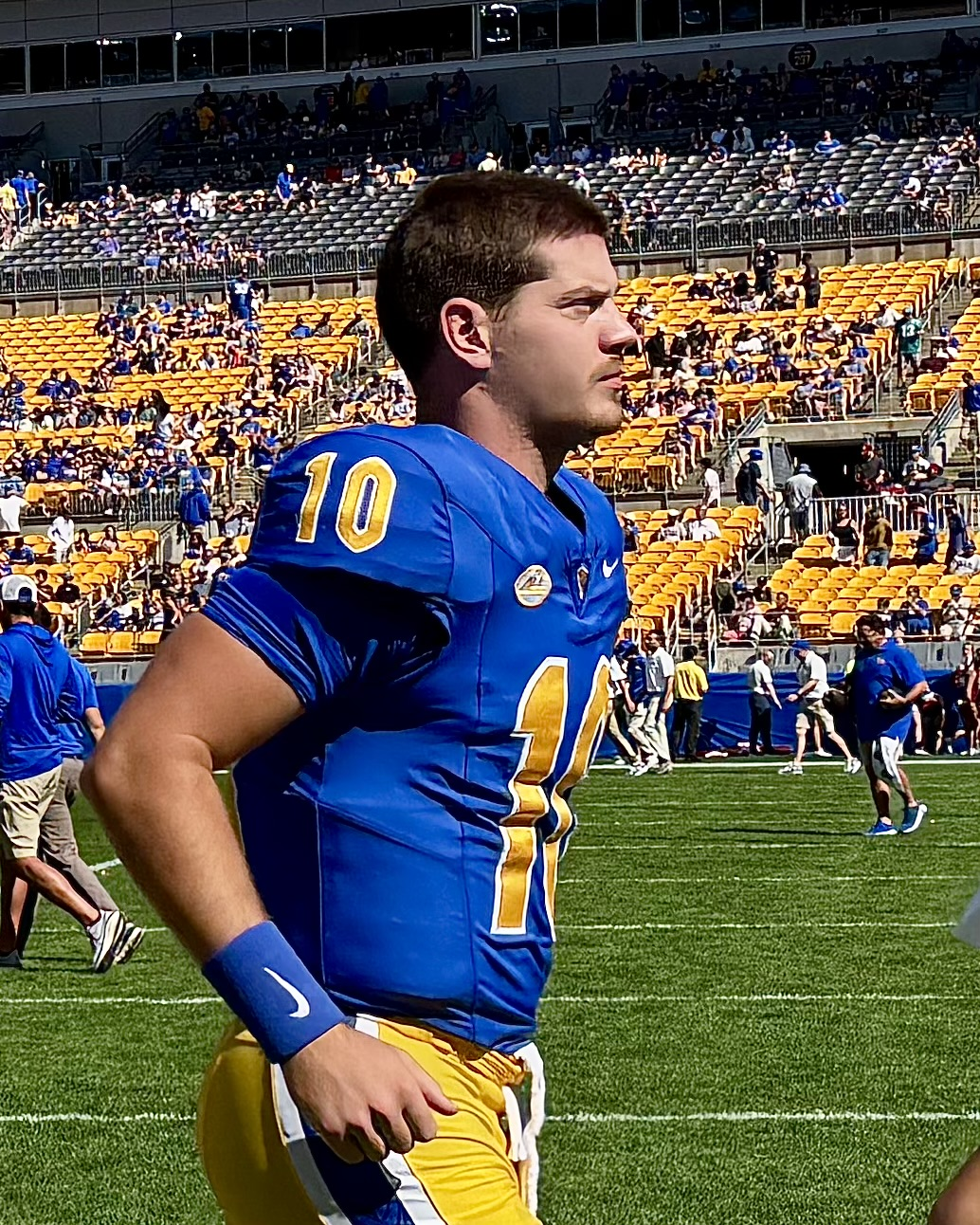

No. 10 – Virginia Cavaliers
- Position: Quarterback
- Class: Redshirt Junior

Personal information
- Born: October 26, 2004 (age 22); Zachary, Louisiana, U.S.
- Listed height: 6 ft 4 in (1.93 m)
- Listed weight: 225 lb (102 kg)

Career information
- High school: Zachary (Zachary, Louisiana)
- College: Alabama (2023); Pittsburgh (2024–2025); Virginia (2026–present)
- Stats at ESPN

Eli Holstein (born October 26, 2004) is an American college football quarterback for the Virginia Cavaliers. He previously played for the Alabama Crimson Tide and Pittsburgh Panthers.

== Early life ==
Holstein attended Zachary High School in Zachary, Louisiana. During his career, he passed for 7,014 yards with 62 touchdowns and rushed for 1,233 yards with 30 touchdowns. He committed to the University of Alabama to play college football.

== College career ==
=== Alabama ===
Holstein redshirted his true freshman season at Alabama in 2023 and did not appear in a game. He was part of a quarterback room that included Jalen Milroe, Ty Simpson, Tyler Buchner, and fellow freshman Dylan Lonergan. Alabama finished the season 12–2, won the SEC Championship, and advanced to the Rose Bowl in the College Football Playoff. On January 3, 2024, Holstein entered the NCAA transfer portal after one season at Alabama.

=== Pittsburgh ===
On January 7, 2024, Holstein announced his commitment to the University of Pittsburgh. In his first season at Pittsburgh, he competed with Nate Yarnell for the starting quarterback position and was named the starter for the 2024 season. In the season opener against Kent State, Holstein completed 31 of 41 passes for 336 yards, three touchdowns, and an interception in a 55–24 victory. The following week against Cincinnati, Pittsburgh overcame a 27–6 deficit in the second half, with Holstein throwing three touchdown passes and leading the Panthers on a game-winning drive that resulted in a field goal for a 28–27 victory. In Week 3 against West Virginia, he overcame a 10-point deficit in the fourth quarter and led another game-winning drive in a 38–34 victory. He led Pittsburgh to a 7–0 start, its best since 1982, with Holstein throwing three touchdown passes in each of the team's first five games. Holstein suffered a series of injuries late in the season. He left the Week 7 victory over Syracuse with an injury but returned the following week against No. 20 SMU, but Pittsburgh suffered its first loss of the season, 48–25, with Holstein completing 29 of 48 passes for 248 yards and an interception. In the following week's loss to Virginia, he suffered another injury and did not return to the game. He missed the following game against No. 20 Clemson before returning as the starter against Louisville, where he suffered a season-ending left-leg injury on a first-quarter sack and was replaced by Yarnell as Pittsburgh lost 37–9. He finished the season having appeared in and started 10 games, compiling a 7–3 record as a starter while completing 180 of 291 passes for 2,228 yards, 17 touchdowns, and seven interceptions. He also rushed for 328 yards and three touchdowns. He was named ACC Rookie of the Week five times and ACC Quarterback of the Week once during the season.

Holstein returned as Pittsburgh's starting quarterback in 2025. He opened the season with consecutive four-touchdown performances against Duquesne and Central Michigan, becoming the first Pittsburgh quarterback since 2003 to throw at least four touchdown passes in each of the team's first two games of a season. Following an overtime loss to West Virginia and a loss to Louisville, Holstein was benched in favor of true freshman Mason Heintschel. He played sparingly in relief in four games as Pittsburgh finished the season 8–5. Holstein appeared in eight games and made four starts, completing 77 of 125 passes for 1,081 yards, 12 touchdowns, and six interceptions while rushing for 88 yards and a touchdown. On January 1, 2026, Holstein entered the transfer portal for the second time.

=== Virginia ===
On January 13, 2026, Holstein announced his commitment to Virginia. Ahead of the 2026 season, head coach Tony Elliott named fellow Missouri transfer Beau Pribula the starting quarterback over Holstein. Holstein made his Cavalier debut in relief of Pribula during the season-opening victory over NC State. The following week against Norfolk State, Holstein again entered in relief and threw his first two touchdown passes as a Cavalier in a 59–3 victory.

=== Statistics ===
Year	Team	Games			Passing								Rushing			
Year	Team	GP	GS	Record	Cmp	Att	Pct	Yds	Y/A	TD	Int	Rtg	Att	Yds	Avg	TD
2023	Alabama	0	0	—	Redshirted (redshirt)											
2024	Pittsburgh	10	10	7–3	180	291	61.9	2,228	7.7	17	7	140.6	81	328	4.0	3
2025	Pittsburgh	8	4	2–2	77	125	61.6	1,081	8.6	12	6	156.3	36	88	2.4	1
2026	Virginia	3	0	0–0	12	18	66.7	180	10.0	3	0	205.7	4	-9	-2.3	0
Career		21	14	9–5	269	434	62.0	3,489	8.0	32	13	147.9	121	407	3.4	4
