= 2025 Pittsburgh Panthers football team =

American college football season

2025 Pittsburgh Panthers football

Military Bowl, L 17–23 vs. East Carolina
- Conference: Atlantic Coast Conference
- Record: 8–5 (6–2 ACC)
- Head coach: Pat Narduzzi (11th season)
- Offensive coordinator: Kade Bell (2nd season)
- Offensive scheme: Hurry-up, no-huddle spread
- Defensive coordinator: Randy Bates (8th season)
- Base defense: 4–3
- Home stadium: Acrisure Stadium

Uniform
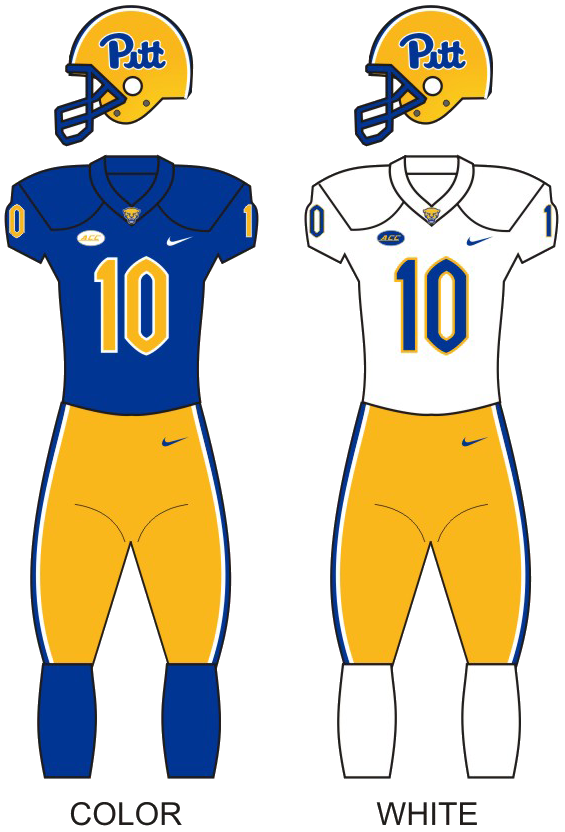

2025 Atlantic Coast Conference football standings
	Conf.			Overall
Team	W		L	W		L
No. 16 Virginia y	7	–	1	11	–	3
Duke y$	6	–	2	9	–	5
No. 2 Miami (FL) ^	6	–	2	13	–	3
Georgia Tech	6	–	2	9	–	4
SMU	6	–	2	9	–	4
Pittsburgh	6	–	2	8	–	5
Louisville	4	–	4	9	–	4
Wake Forest	4	–	4	9	–	4
NC State	4	–	4	8	–	5
California	4	–	4	7	–	6
Clemson	4	–	4	7	–	6
Stanford	3	–	5	4	–	8
Florida State	2	–	6	5	–	7
Virginia Tech	2	–	6	3	–	9
North Carolina	2	–	6	4	–	8
Boston College	1	–	7	2	–	10
Syracuse	1	–	7	3	–	9
Championship: Duke 27, Virginia 20^{OT}
^ – College Football Playoff participant; $ – Conference champion; y – Championship game participant; As of October 25, 2026; Rankings from AP Poll

The 2025 Pittsburgh Panthers football team represented the University of Pittsburgh as a member of the Atlantic Coast Conference (ACC) during the 2025 NCAA Division I FBS football season. The Panthers were led by eleventh-year head coach Pat Narduzzi and played their home games at Acrisure Stadium located in Pittsburgh.

The Pittsburgh Panthers drew an average home attendance of 51,845.

== Transfers ==
=== Outgoing ===
Player	Position	Destination
Cameron Monteiro	WR	Akron
Moritz Schmoranzer	OT	Appalachian State
Andy Jean	WR	Arkansas
Jaremiah Anglin Jr.	S	Benedict
Montravius Lloyd	RB	Bethune–Cookman
Ty Dieffenbach	QB	Cal Poly
Graysen Riffe	OT	Eastern Kentucky
Brody Riffe	OT	Eastern Kentucky
Adham Abouraya	OT	Eastern Michigan
Bryson Harrington	DL	Fresno State
Ryland Gandy	CB	Indiana
Lamar Seymore	WR	Iowa Western
Terrence Enos	IOL	Kansas State
Thomas Aden	DL	Kent State
Noah Biglow	CB	Louisiana Tech
David Ojiegbe	EDGE	Norfolk State
Rodney Hammond	RB	Sacramento State
Nate Yarnell	QB	Texas State
Matt Metrosky	IOL	The Citadel
Terrence Moore	IOL	Toledo
Nahki Johnson	DL	Tulsa
Tamarion Crumpley	CB	UAB
Sincere Edwards	EDGE	UCF
Jake Renda	TE	UCLA
Jake McConnachie	WR	UMass
Chief Borders	EDGE	UNLV
Daejon Reynolds	WR	UNLV
Jordan Bass	LB	Virginia Tech
Julian Dugger	QB	Washington State
Elliot Donald	DL	None
Franco Fernandez-Enjo	K	None
Dylan Bennett	LB	None

=== Incoming ===
Player	Position	Previous Team
Rashan Murray	WR	California (PA)
Kendall Stanley	OT	Charlotte
Joey Zelinsky	DL	Eastern Michigan
Andy Jean	WR	Florida
Deuce Spann	WR	Florida State
Cataurus Hicks	WR	Louisville
Justin Holmes	TE	Marshall
Jeffrey Persi	OT	Michigan
Zion Ferguson	CB	North Carolina
Jayden Bonsu	S	Ohio State
Cole Gonzales	QB	Oklahoma
Jaeden Moore	LB	Oregon
Keith Gouveia	IOL	Richmond
Kavir Bains	S	UC Davis
Blaine Spires	EDGE	Utah State

== Schedule ==
Date	Time	Opponent	Rank	Site	TV	Result	Attendance
August 30	12:00 p.m.	Duquesne*		Acrisure Stadium; Pittsburgh, PA (City Game)	ACCN	W 61–9	53,006
September 6	12:00 p.m.	Central Michigan*		Acrisure Stadium; Pittsburgh, PA	ESPNU	W 45–17	48,424
September 13	3:30 p.m.	at West Virginia*		Milan Puskar Stadium; Morgantown, WV (Backyard Brawl)	ESPN	L 24–31 ^{OT}	62,108
September 27	12:00 p.m.	Louisville		Acrisure Stadium; Pittsburgh, PA	ESPN2	L 27–34	45,301
October 4	12:00 p.m.	Boston College		Acrisure Stadium; Pittsburgh, PA	ACCN	W 48–7	51,101
October 11	12:00 p.m.	at No. 25 Florida State		Doak Campbell Stadium; Tallahassee, FL	ESPN	W 34–31	65,256
October 18	7:30 p.m.	at Syracuse		JMA Wireless Dome; Syracuse, NY (rivalry)	ACCN	W 30–13	40,772
October 25	3:30 p.m.	NC State		Acrisure Stadium; Pittsburgh, PA	ACCN	W 53–34	46,840
November 1	3:30 p.m.	at Stanford		Stanford Stadium; Stanford, CA	ACCN	W 35–20	16,540
November 15	12:00 p.m.	No. 9 Notre Dame*	No. 22	Acrisure Stadium; Pittsburgh, PA (rivalry, College GameDay)	ABC	L 15–37	68,400
November 22	7:00 p.m.	at No. 16 Georgia Tech		Bobby Dodd Stadium; Atlanta, GA	ESPN	W 42–28	52,413
November 29	12:00 p.m.	No. 12 Miami (FL)	No. 22	Acrisure Stadium; Pittsburgh, PA	ABC	L 7–38	49,845
December 27	11:00 a.m.	vs. East Carolina*		Navy–Marine Corps Memorial Stadium; Annapolis, MD (Military Bowl)	ESPN	L 17–23	17,016
*Non-conference game; Rankings from AP Poll (and CFP Rankings, after November 4) - Released prior to game; All times are in Eastern time

== Game summaries ==
=== vs Duquesne (FCS, City Game) ===
Duquesne Dukes (FCS) (0–0) at Pittsburgh Panthers (0–0) – Game summary

Quarter	1	2	3	4	Total
Dukes (FCS)	0	6	0	3	9
Panthers	14	20	14	13	61

at Acrisure Stadium • Pittsburgh, PA

- Date: August 30
- Game time: 12:00 p.m. EDT
- Game weather: 65°F, Sunny, Wind N @ 5 mph
- Game attendance: 53,006
- Referee: Riley Johnson
- TV announcers (ACCN): Clay Matvick (play-by-play) and Chase Daniel (analyst)

Game information

First quarter

- PITT – Desmond Reid 88-yard punt return (Trey Butkowski kick), 12:14. Panthers 7–0.
- PITT – Cataurus Hicks 4-yard pass from Eli Holstein (Trey Butkowski kick), 2:47. Panthers 14–0. Drive: 11 plays, 62 yards, 4:50.

Second quarter

- DUQ – B.J. Alexander 7-yard pass from Tyler Riddell (Matt Marcinko kick failed), 10:28. Panthers 14–6. Drive: 2 plays, 61 yards, 0:35.
- PITT – Juelz Goff 1-yard run (Trey Butkowski kick BLOCKED), 9:24. Panthers 20–6. Drive: 3 plays, 18 yards, 0:52.
- PITT – Kenny Johnson 20-yard pass from Eli Holstein (Trey Butkowski kick), 4:01. Panthers 27–6. Drive: 3 plays, 47 yards, 1:06.
- PITT – Cataurus Hicks 16-yard pass from Eli Holstein (Trey Butkowski kick), 0:48. Panthers 34–6. Drive: 6 plays, 80 yards, 1:43.

Third quarter

- PITT – Desmond Reid 53-yard run (Trey Butkowski kick), 14:14. Panthers 41–6. Drive: 2 plays, 75 yards, 0:46.
- PITT – Malachi Thomas 34-yard pass from Eli Holstein (Trey Butkowski kick), 3:14. Panthers 48–6. Drive: 8 plays, 75 yards, 3:33.

Fourth quarter

- DUQ – Matt Marcinko 35-yard field goal, 13:56. Panthers 48–9. Drive: 8 plays, 33 yards, 4:18.
- PITT – Trey Butkowski 27-yard field goal, 8:03. Panthers 51–9. Drive: 9 plays, 31 yards, 3:03.
- PITT – Trey Butkowski 27-yard field goal, 3:32. Panthers 54–9. Drive: 7 plays, 12 yards, 2:21.
- PITT – Bryce Yates 60-yard pass from Cole Gonzales (Trey Butkowski kick), 1:12. Panthers 61–9. Drive: 2 plays, 60 yards, 0:38.

Statistics	DUQ	PITT
First downs	8	21
Plays–yards	57–212	65–460
Rushes–yards	30–41	27–158
Passing yards	171	302
Passing: comp–att–int	17–27–0	23–38–1
Turnovers	0	1
Time of possession	35:23	24:37

Team	Category	Player	Statistics
Duquesne	Passing	Tyler Riddell	14/23, 154 yards, TD
Duquesne	Rushing	Taj Butts	10 carries, 38 yards
Duquesne	Receiving	Joey Isabella	8 receptions, 120 yards
Pittsburgh	Passing	Eli Holstein	15/23, 215 yards, 4 TD, INT
Pittsburgh	Rushing	Desmond Reid	8 carries, 66 yards, TD
Pittsburgh	Receiving	Bryce Yates	2 receptions, 69 yards, TD

=== vs Central Michigan ===
Central Michigan Chippewas (1–0) at Pittsburgh Panthers (1–0) – Game summary

Quarter	1	2	3	4	Total
Chippewas	0	10	7	0	17
Panthers	7	17	7	14	45

at Acrisure Stadium • Pittsburgh, PA

- Date: September 6
- Game time: 12:00 p.m. EDT
- Game weather: 66°F, Cloudy, Wind SW @ 4 mph
- Game attendance: 48,424
- Referee: Justin Elliott
- TV announcers (ESPNU): Brian Custer (play-by-play) and Max Starks (analyst)

Game information

First quarter

- PITT – Raphael Williams Jr. 3-yard pass from Eli Holstein (Trey Butkowski kick), 11:56. Panthers 7–0. Drive: 7 plays, 72 yards, 2:58.

Second quarter

- CMU – Cade Graham 41-yard field goal, 12:28. Panthers 7–3. Drive: 12 plays, 53 yards, 6:42.
- PITT – Justin Holmes 12-yard pass from Eli Holstein (Trey Butkowski kick), 11:03. Panthers 14–3. Drive: 5 plays, 74 yards, 1:20.
- PITT – Josh Altsman 2-yard pass from Eli Holstein (Trey Butkowski kick), 6:40. Panthers 21–3. Drive: 6 plays, 52 yards, 2:20.
- PITT – Trey Butkowski 43-yard field goal, 2:08. Panthers 24–3. Drive: 6 plays, 24 yards, 2:51.
- CMU – Jadyn Glasser 2-yard run (Cade Graham kick), 11:03. Panthers 24–10. Drive: 6 plays, 13 yards, 0:44.

Third quarter

- CMU – DeCorion Temple 2-yard pass from Joe Labas (Cade Graham kick), 3:01. Panthers 24–17. Drive: 11 plays, 63 yards, 7:18.
- PITT – Raphael Williams Jr. 48-yard pass from Eli Holstein (Trey Butkowski kick), 2:15. Panthers 31–17. Drive: 10 plays, 30 yards, 5:06.

Fourth quarter

- PITT – Juelz Goff Jr. 2-yard run (Trey Butkowski kick), 2:15. Panthers 38–17. Drive: 12 plays, 44 yards, 7:29.
- PITT – Ja'Kyrian Turner 2-yard run (Trey Butkowski kick), 0:45. Panthers 45–17. Drive: 8 plays, 69 yards, 2:20.

Statistics	CMU	PITT
First downs	13	22
Plays–yards	68–217	58–465
Rushes–yards	41–40	26–124
Passing yards	177	340
Passing: comp–att–int	27–20–0	32–24–1
Turnovers	1	1
Time of possession	36:43	23:17

Team	Category	Player	Statistics
Central Michigan	Passing	Joe Labas	11/14, 89 yards, TD
Central Michigan	Rushing	Angel H. Flores	9 carries, 18 yards
Central Michigan	Receiving	Camden Kruisenga	1 reception, 26 yards
Pittsburgh	Passing	Eli Holstein	21/28, 304 yards, 4 TD, INT
Pittsburgh	Rushing	Desmond Reid	10 carries, 46 yards
Pittsburgh	Receiving	Raphael Williams Jr.	6 receptions, 121 yards, 2 TD

=== at West Virginia (Backyard Brawl) ===
Pittsburgh Panthers (2–0) at West Virginia Mountaineers (1–1) – Game summary

Quarter	1	2	3	4	OT	Total
Panthers	0	3	11	10	0	24
Mountaineers	0	7	7	10	7	31

at Milan Puskar Stadium • Morgantown, WV

- Date: September 13
- Game time: 3:30 p.m. EDT
- Game weather: 81°F, Sunny, Wind W @ 6 mph
- Game attendance: 62,108
- Referee: Justin Elliott
- TV announcers (ESPN): Mark Jones (play-by-play), Roddy Jones (analyst) and Quint Kessenich (sideline)

Game information

First quarter

- No scoring plays.

Second quarter

- WVU – Tye Edwards 12-yard run (Kade Hensley kick), 11:51. Mountaineers 7–0. Drive: 9 plays, 75 yards, 3:30.
- PITT – Trey Butkowski 23-yard field goal, 1:37. Mountaineers 7–3. Drive: 7 plays, 75 yards, 0:55.

Third quarter

- WVU – Tye Edwards 1-yard run (Kade Hensley kick), 8:27. Mountaineers 14–3. Drive: 7 plays, 80 yards, 3:08.
- PITT – Eli Holstein 1-yard run (Eli Holstein–Cataurus Hicks pass), 6:16. Mountaineers 14–11. Drive: 5 plays, 75 yards, 2:11.
- PITT – Trey Butkowski 46-yard field goal, 3:30. Tied 14–14. Drive: 4 plays, -14 yards, 1:59.

Fourth quarter

- PITT – Trey Butkowski 36-yard field goal, 14:56. Panthers 17–14. Drive: 4 plays, 6 yards, 2:27.
- PITT – Raphael Williams Jr. 14-yard pass from Eli Holstein (Trey Butkowski kick), 9:23. Panthers 24–14. Drive: 6 plays, 47 yards, 2:03.
- WVU – Kade Hensley 21-yard field goal, 5:03. Panthers 24–17. Drive: 12 plays, 72 yards, 4:20.
- WVU – Grayson Barnes 2-yard pass from Nicco Marchiol (Kade Hensley kick), 0:11. Tied 24–24. Drive: 13 plays, 87 yards, 2:36.

Overtime

- WVU – Tye Edwards 1-yard run (Kade Hensley kick). Mountaineers 31–24. Drive: 8 plays, 25 yards.

Statistics	PITT	WVU
First downs	15	28
Plays–yards	72–349	90–434
Rushes–yards	34–46	58–174
Passing yards	303	260
Passing: comp–att–int	22–38–1	22–32–2
Turnovers	1	2
Time of possession	28:59	31:01

Team	Category	Player	Statistics
Pittsburgh	Passing	Eli Holstein	22/37, 303 yards, TD, INT
Pittsburgh	Rushing	Juelz Goff	8 carries, 37 yards
Pittsburgh	Receiving	Raphael Williams Jr.	6 receptions, 119 yards, TD
West Virginia	Passing	Nicco Marchiol	19/25, 192 yards, TD
West Virginia	Rushing	Tye Edwards	25 carries, 141 yards, 3 TD
West Virginia	Receiving	Rodney Gallagher III	7 receptions, 61 yards

=== vs Louisville ===
Louisville Cardinals (3–0) at Pittsburgh Panthers (2–1) – Game summary

Quarter	1	2	3	4	Total
Cardinals	0	17	3	14	34
Panthers	17	10	0	0	27

at Acrisure Stadium • Pittsburgh, PA

- Date: September 27
- Game time: 12:00 p.m. EDT
- Game weather: 71°F, Cloudy, Wind NE @ 4 mph
- Game attendance: 45,301
- Referee: Justin Elliott
- TV announcers (ESPN2): Roy Philpott (play-by-play), Sam Acho (analyst) and Taylor Davis (sideline)

Game information

First quarter

- (11:34) PITT – Trey Butkowski 30-yard field goal (Drive: 10 plays, 77 yards, 3:21; Pittsburgh 3–0)
- (9:53) PITT – Cataurus Hicks 39-yard pass from Eli Holstein (Trey Butkowski kick) (Drive: 2 plays, 53 yards, 0:28; Pittsburgh 10–0)
- (1:41) PITT – Rasheem Biles 75-yard interception return (Trey Butkowski kick) (Pittsburgh 17–0)

Second quarter

- (12:32) LOU – Miller Moss 1-yard run (Cooper Ranvier kick) (Drive: 3 plays, 3 yards, 1:31; Pittsburgh 17–7)
- (5:03) LOU – Cooper Ranvier 35-yard field goal (Drive: 14 plays, 65 yards, 6:11; Pittsburgh 17–10)
- (3:42) LOU – Chris Bell 25-yard pass from Miller Moss (Cooper Ranvier kick) (Drive: 1 play, 25 yards, 0:06; Tied 17–17)
- (1:42) PITT – Trey Butkowski 37-yard field goal (Drive: 9 plays, 56 yards, 2:00; Pittsburgh 20–17)
- (0:19) PITT – Raphael Williams Jr. 38-yard pass from Eli Holstein (Trey Butkowski kick) (Drive: 4 plays, 66 yards, 0:32; Pittsburgh 27–17)

Third quarter

- (11:44) LOU – Nick Keller 57-yard field goal (Drive: 7 plays, 36 yards, 3:16; Pittsburgh 27–20)

Fourth quarter

- (10:49) LOU – Jaleel Skinner 12-yard pass from Miller Moss (Cooper Ranvier kick) (Drive: 6 plays, 61 yards, 2:34; Tied 27–27)
- (7:03) LOU – Nate Kurisky 9-yard pass from Miller Moss (Cooper Ranvier kick) (Drive: 6 plays, 30 yards, 2:58; Louisville 34–27)

Statistics	LOU	PITT
First downs	23	14
Plays–yards	85–392	55–339
Rushes–yards	34–53	23–80
Passing yards	339	259
Passing: comp–att–int	33–51–1	17–32–3
Turnovers	1	5
Time of possession	39:22	20:38

Team	Category	Player	Statistics
Louisville	Passing	Miller Moss	33/51, 339 yards, 3 TD, INT
Louisville	Rushing	Duke Watson	14 carries, 47 yards
Louisville	Receiving	Chris Bell	10 receptions, 135 yards, TD
Pittsburgh	Passing	Eli Holstein	14/26, 228 yards, 2 TD, 2 INT
Pittsburgh	Rushing	Ja'Kyrian Turner	6 carries, 36 yards
Pittsburgh	Receiving	Cataurus Hicks	4 receptions, 113 yards, TD

=== vs Boston College ===
Boston College Eagles (1–3) at Pittsburgh Panthers (2–2) – Game summary

Quarter	1	2	3	4	Total
Eagles	0	0	0	7	7
Panthers	10	21	14	3	48

at Acrisure Stadium • Pittsburgh, PA

- Date: October 4
- Game time: 12:00 p.m. EDT
- Game weather: 73°F, Sunny, Wind S @ 3 mph
- Game attendance: 51,101
- Referee: Jon Noli
- TV announcers (ACCN): Chris Cotter (play-by-play), Max Browne (analyst) and Kendra Douglas (sideline)

Game information

First quarter

- (7:22) PITT – Justin Holmes 14-yard pass from Mason Heintschel, Trey Butkowski kick (Drive: 11 plays, 76 yards, 5:30; Pittsburgh 7–0)
- (0:39) PITT – Trey Butkowski 31-yard field goal (Drive: 10 plays, 42 yards, 4:25; Pittsburgh 10–0)

Second quarter

- (6:25) PITT – Kenny Johnson 12-yard pass from Mason Heintschel, Trey Butkowski kick (Drive: 9 plays, 66 yards, 3:51; Pittsburgh 17–0)
- (1:56) PITT – Juelz Goff 3-yard run, Trey Butkowski kick (Drive: 12 plays, 65 yards, 3:46; Pittsburgh 24–0)
- (0:10) PITT – Ja'Kyrian Turner 6-yard run, Trey Butkowski kick (Drive: 6 plays, 62 yards, 1:01; Pittsburgh 31–0)

Third quarter

- (9:08) PITT – Deuce Spann 10-yard pass from Mason Heintschel, Trey Butkowski kick (Drive: 7 plays, 39 yards, 3:13; Pittsburgh 38–0)
- (1:39) PITT – Zion Fowler-El 18-yard pass from Mason Heintschel, Trey Butkowski kick (Drive: 10 plays, 61 yards, 5:32; Pittsburgh 45–0)

Fourth quarter

- (8:28) PITT – Trey Butkowski 47-yard field goal (Drive: 10 plays, 47 yards, 4:57; Pittsburgh 48–0)
- (1:57) BC – Kaelan Chudzinski 3-yard pass from Shaker Reisig, Luca Lombardo kick (Drive: 9 plays, 80 yards, 4:01; Pittsburgh 48–7)

Statistics	BC	PITT
First downs	11	31
Plays–yards	54–216	88–503
Rushes–yards	24–27	43–172
Passing yards	189	331
Passing: comp–att–int	14–30–1	32–45–0
Turnovers	3	0
Time of possession	20:52	39:08

Team	Category	Player	Statistics
Boston College	Passing	Dylan Lonergan	9/18, 89 yards
Boston College	Rushing	Jordan McDonald	5 carries, 31 yards
Boston College	Receiving	Kaelan Chudzinski	3 receptions, 70 yards, TD
Pittsburgh	Passing	Mason Heintschel	30/41, 323 yards, 4 TD
Pittsburgh	Rushing	Ja'Kyrian Turner	12 carries, 67 yards, TD
Pittsburgh	Receiving	Kenny Johnson	9 receptions, 115 yards, TD

=== at No. 25 Florida State ===
Pittsburgh Panthers (3–2) at No. 25 Florida State Seminoles (3–2) – Game summary

Quarter	1	2	3	4	Total
Panthers	7	7	7	13	34
No. 25 Seminoles	7	14	3	7	31

at Doak Campbell Stadium • Tallahassee, FL

- Date: October 11
- Game time: 12:00 p.m. EDT
- Game weather: 70°F, Cloudy, Wind NE @ 10 mph
- Game attendance: 65,256
- Referee: Riley Johnson
- TV announcers (ESPN): Dave Pasch (play-by-play), Dusty Dvoracek (analyst), and Taylor McGregor (sideline)

Game information

First quarter

- (6:55) PITT - Ja'Kyrian Turner 10-yard run, Trey Butkowski kick (Drive: 15 plays, 75 yards, 8:05; Pittsburgh 7–0)
- (3:17) FSU - Caziah Holmes 1-yard run, Jake Weinberg kick (Drive: 8 plays, 65 yards, 3:38; Tied 7–7)

Second quarter

- (14:21) PITT - Desmond Reid 24-yard pass from Mason Heintschel, Trey Butkowski kick (Drive: 9 plays, 75 yards, 3:56; Pittsburgh 14–7)
- (4:20) FSU - Micahi Danzy 33-yard pass from Tommy Castellanos, Jake Weinberg kick (Drive: 6 plays, 62 yards, 2:35; Tied 14–14)
- (0:06) FSU - Landen Thomas 25-yard pass from Tommy Castellanos, Jake Weinberg kick (Drive: 7 plays, 88 yards, 1:20; Florida State 21–14)

Third quarter

- (10:15) PITT - Desmond Reid 16-yard pass from Mason Heintschel, Trey Butkowski kick (Drive: 7 plays, 85 yards, 3:05; Tied 21–21)
- (5:41) FSU - Jake Weinberg 34-yard field goal (Drive: 10 plays, 50 yards, 4:34; Florida State 24–21)

Fourth quarter

- (11:38) PITT - Trey Butkowski 28-yard field goal (Drive: 5 plays, 39 yards, 1:47; Tied 24–24)
- (7:15) PITT - Trey Butkowski 34-yard field goal (Drive: 6 plays, 54 yards, 2:58; Pittsburgh 27–24)
- (2:28) PITT - Ja'Kyrian Turner 3-yard run, Trey Butkowski kick (Drive: 8 plays, 73 yards, 3:50; Pittsburgh 34–24)
- (1:45) FSU - Micahi Danzy 58-yard pass from Tommy Castellanos, Jake Weinberg kick (Drive: 4 plays, 75 yards, 0:43; Pittsburgh 34–31)

Statistics	PITT	FSU
First downs	23	21
Plays–yards	71–476	63–415
Rushes–yards	42–155	40–170
Passing yards	321	245
Passing: comp–att–int	21–29–2	16–23–0
Turnovers	2	1
Time of possession	32:35	27:25

Team	Category	Player	Statistics
Pittsburgh	Passing	Mason Heintschel	21/29, 321 yards, 2 TD, 2 INT
Pittsburgh	Rushing	Mason Heintschel	16 carries, 64 yards
Pittsburgh	Receiving	Desmond Reid	8 receptions, 155 yards, 2 TD
Florida State	Passing	Tommy Castellanos	16/23, 245 yards, 3 TD
Florida State	Rushing	Gavin Sawchuk	14 carries, 71 yards
Florida State	Receiving	Micahi Danzy	7 receptions, 133 yards, 2 TD

=== at Syracuse (rivalry) ===
Pittsburgh Panthers (4–2) at Syracuse Orange (3–3) – Game summary

Quarter	1	2	3	4	Total
Panthers	7	10	3	10	30
Orange	7	0	0	6	13

at JMA Wireless Dome • Syracuse, NY

- Date: October 18
- Game time: 7:30 p.m. EDT
- Game weather: Indoor
- Game attendance: 40,772
- Referee: Tim Hedgepath
- TV announcers (ACCN): Chris Cotter (play-by-play), Max Browne (analyst), and Kendra Douglas (sideline)

Game information

First quarter

- (11:49) PITT - Mason Heintschel 36-yard run, Trey Butkowski kick (Drive: 3 plays, 37 yards, 1:55; Pittsburgh 7–0)
- (2:08) SYR - Darrell Gill Jr. 11-yard pass from Rickie Collins, Tripp Woody kick (Drive: 2 plays, 12 yards, 0:52; Tied 7–7)

Second quarter

- (11:00) PITT - Trey Butkowski 31-yard field goal (Drive: 14 plays, 62 yards, 6:08; Pittsburgh 10–7)
- (0:02) PITT - Kenny Johnson 66-yard punt return, Trey Butkowski kick (Pittsburgh 17–7)

Third quarter

- (11:20) PITT - Trey Butkowski 42-yard field goal (Drive: 9 plays, 51 yards, 3:40; Pittsburgh 20–7)

Fourth quarter

- (10:48) PITT - Trey Butkowski 32-yard field goal (Drive: 4 plays, 4 yards, 0:49; Pittsburgh 23–7)
- (6:19) SYR - Emanuel Ross 12-yard pass from Rickie Collins, Rickie Collins run failed (Drive: 9 plays, 65 yards, 4:22; Pittsburgh 23–13)
- (1:57) PITT - Juelz Goff 1-yard run, Trey Butkowski kick (Drive: 10 plays, 35 yards, 3:28; Pittsburgh 30–13)

Statistics	PITT	SYR
First downs	16	13
Plays–yards	67–260	66–212
Rushes–yards	41–117	32–76
Passing yards	143	136
Passing: comp–att–int	13–24–1	17–34–3
Turnovers	1	3
Time of possession	29:58	30:02

Team	Category	Player	Statistics
Pittsburgh	Passing	Mason Heintschel	13/24, 143 yards, INT
Pittsburgh	Rushing	Ja'Kyrian Turner	15 carries, 42 yards
Pittsburgh	Receiving	Kenny Johnson	4 receptions, 59 yards
Syracuse	Passing	Rickie Collins	15/31, 126 yards, 2 TD, 3 INT
Syracuse	Rushing	Rickie Collins	10 carries, 37 yards
Syracuse	Receiving	Johntay Cook II	6 receptions, 66 yards

=== vs NC State ===
NC State Wolfpack (4–3) at Pittsburgh Panthers (5–2) – Game summary

Quarter	1	2	3	4	Total
Wolfpack	7	14	0	13	34
Panthers	10	21	15	7	53

at Acrisure Stadium • Pittsburgh, PA

- Date: October 25
- Game time: 3:30 p.m.
- Game weather: 55°F, Cloudy, Wind SW @ 2 mph
- Game attendance: 46,840
- Referee: Jerry Magallanes
- TV announcers (ACCN): Chris Cotter (play-by-play), Max Browne (analyst), and Kendra Douglas (sideline)

Game information

First quarter

- (11:13) PITT - Ja'Kyrian Turner 1-yard run, Trey Butkowski kick (Drive: 7 plays, 49 yards, 2:29; Pittsburgh 7–0)
- (6:05) PITT - Trey Butkowski 34-yard field goal (Drive: 10 plays, 62 yards, 4:01; Pittsburgh 10–0)
- (3:08) NCSU - Justin Joly 25-yard pass from CJ Bailey, Kanoah Vinesett kick (Drive: 6 plays, 74 yards, 2:52; Pittsburgh 10–7)

Second quarter

- (14:57) PITT - Desmond Reid 2-yard run, Trey Butkowski kick (Drive: 7 plays, 83 yards, 3:06; Pittsburgh 17–7)
- (14:46) NCSU - Hollywood Smothers 65-yard run, Kanoah Vinesett kick (Drive: 1 play, 65 yards, 0:11; Pittsburgh 17–14)
- (7:15) PITT - Raphael Williams Jr. 7-yard pass from Mason Heintschel, Trey Butkowski kick (Drive: 7 plays, 90 yards, 3:19; Pittsburgh 24–14)
- (3:20) NCSU - Justin Joly 59-yard pass from Teddy Hoffmann, Kanoah Vinesett kick (Drive: 4 plays, 83 yards, 2:09; Pittsburgh 24–21)
- (0:12) PITT - Kenny Johnson 10-yard pass from Mason Heintschel, Trey Butkowski kick (Drive: 9 plays, 75 yards, 3:08; Pittsburgh 31–21)

Third quarter

- (12:42) PITT - Trey Butkowski 41-yard field goal (Drive: 10 plays, 43 yards, 2:12; Pittsburgh 34–21)
- (10:46) PITT - Cataurus Hicks 84-yard pass from Mason Heintschel, Mason Heintschel pass failed (Drive: 1 play, 84 yards, 0:12; Pittsburgh 40–21)
- (7:02) PITT - Trey Butkowski 35-yard field goal (Drive: 7 plays, 32 yards, 2:47; Pittsburgh 43–21)
- (1:55) PITT - Trey Butkowski 43-yard field goal (Drive: 5 plays, 19 yards, 2:52; Pittsburgh 46–21)

Fourth quarter

- (11:16) NCSU - Teddy Hoffmann 30-yard pass from CJ Bailey, Kanoah Vinesett kick (Drive: 9 plays, 70 yards, 3:35; Pittsburgh 46–28)
- (6:59) PITT - Ja'Kyrian Turner 6-yard run, Trey Butkowski kick (Drive: 7 plays, 43 yards, 4:17; Pittsburgh 53–28)
- (1:00) NCSU - Noah Rogers 25-yard pass from CJ Bailey, Will Wilson run failed (Drive: 6 plays, 70 yards, 1:22; Pittsburgh 53–34)

Statistics	NCSU	PITT
First downs	15	29
Plays–yards	60–445	82–529
Rushes–yards	19–161	33–106
Passing yards	284	423
Passing: comp–att–int	25–41–0	28–49–1
Turnovers	1	1
Time of possession	25:04	34:56

Team	Category	Player	Statistics
NC State	Passing	CJ Bailey	24/40, 225 yards, 3 TD
NC State	Rushing	Hollywood Smothers	8 carries, 86 yards, TD
NC State	Receiving	Justin Joly	6 receptions, 101 yards, 2 TD
Pittsburgh	Passing	Mason Heintschel	28/48, 423 yards, 3 TD
Pittsburgh	Rushing	Ja'Kyrian Turner	13 carries, 50 yards, 2 TD
Pittsburgh	Receiving	Cataurus Hicks	4 receptions, 120 yards, TD

=== at Stanford ===
Pittsburgh Panthers (6–2) at Stanford Cardinal (3–5) – Game summary

Quarter	1	2	3	4	Total
Panthers	7	14	14	0	35
Cardinal	10	3	0	7	20

at Stanford Stadium • Stanford, CA

- Date: November 1
- Game time: 3:30 p.m. EDT
- Game weather: Sunny
- Game attendance: 16,540
- Referee: Nate Black
- TV announcers (ACCN): Chris Cotter (play-by-play), Max Browne (analyst), and Sherree Burruss (sideline)

Game information

First quarter

- PITT – Kenny Johnson 17-yard pass from Mason Heintschel (Trey Butkowski kick), 11:56. Panthers 7–0. Drive: 4 plays, 35 yards, 1:33.
- STAN – Emmet Kenney 39-yard field goal, 9:35. Panthers 7–3. Drive: 7 plays, 62 yards, 1:35.
- STAN – CJ Williams 35-yard pass from Ben Gulbranson (Emmet Kenney kick), 6:20. Cardinal 10–7. Drive: 3 plays, 36 yards, 0:41.

Second quarter

- PITT – Deuce Spann 4-yard run (Trey Butkowski kick), 14:56. Panthers 14–10. Drive: 9 plays, 60 yards, 3:23.
- PITT – Raphael Williams Jr. 5-yard pass from Mason Heintschel (Trey Butkowski kick), 1:47. Panthers 21–10. Drive: 7 plays, 50 yards, 2:23.
- STAN – Emmet Kenney 45-yard field goal, 0:00. Panthers 21–13. Drive: 10 plays, 48 yards, 1:47.

Third quarter

- PITT – Jake Overman 14-yard pass from Mason Heintschel (Trey Butkowski kick), 5:54. Panthers 28–13. Drive: 7 plays, 89 yards, 2:55.
- PITT – Shawn Lee Jr. 30-yard interception return (Trey Butkowski kick), 5:46. Panthers 35–13.

Fourth quarter

- STAN – CJ Williams 19-yard pass from Elijah Brown (AJ Seidler kick), 0:18. Panthers 35–20. Drive: 11 plays, 97 yards, 3:29.

Statistics	PITT	STAN
First downs	25	18
Plays–yards	73–466	71–326
Rushes–yards	35–162	27––10
Passing yards	304	336
Passing: comp–att–int	23–38–2	27–44–3
Turnovers	4	3
Time of possession	30:30	29:30

Team	Category	Player	Statistics
Pittsburgh	Passing	Mason Heintschel	23/38, 304 yards, 3 TD, 2 INT
Pittsburgh	Rushing	Ja'Kyrian Turner	22 carries, 127 yards
Pittsburgh	Receiving	Kenny Johnson	4 receptions, 71 yards, TD
Stanford	Passing	Ben Gulbranson	17/30, 228 yards, TD, 3 INT
Stanford	Rushing	Sedrick Irvin	8 carries, 24 yards
Stanford	Receiving	CJ Williams	7 receptions, 122 yards, 2 TD

=== vs No. 9 Notre Dame (rivalry) ===
No. 9 Notre Dame Fighting Irish (7–2) at No. 22 Pittsburgh Panthers (7–2) – Game summary

Quarter	1	2	3	4	Total
No. 9 Fighting Irish	14	7	9	7	37
No. 22 Panthers	0	3	6	6	15

at Acrisure Stadium • Pittsburgh, PA

- Date: November 15
- Game time: 12:00 p.m. EST
- Game weather: Cloudy, 60 °F (16 °C), Wind SW @ 11 mph (18 km/h)
- Game attendance: 68,400
- Referee: Tim Hedgepeth
- TV announcers (ABC): Joe Tessitore (play-by-play), Jesse Palmer (analyst), and Katie George (sideline)

Game information

First quarter

- (8:16) ND – Jeremiyah Love 56-yard run, Erik Schmidt kick (Drive: 1 play, 56 yards, 0:10, Notre Dame 7–0)
- (7:59) ND – Tae Johnson 49-yard interception return, Erik Schmidt kick (Drive: 0:10, Notre Dame 14–0)

Second quarter

- (13:55) PITT – Sam Carpenter 24-yard field goal (Drive: 4 plays, 6 yards, 0:47, Notre Dame 14–3)
- (1:56) ND – Malachi Fields 25-yard pass from CJ Carr, Erik Schmidt kick (Drive: 6 plays, 52 yards, 2:40, Notre Dame 21–3)

Third quarter

- (10:43) ND – Malachi Fields 6-yard pass from CJ Carr, Erik Schmidt kick (Drive: 9 plays, 54 yards, 4:07, Notre Dame 28–3)
- (1:39) PITT – Rasheem Biles 10-yard interception return, Tony Kinsler pass from Mason Heintschel failed (Drive: 2:37, Notre Dame 28–9)
- (1:39) ND – Adon Shuler PAT return (Drive: 5 plays, 14 yards, Notre Dame 30–9)

Fourth quarter

- (9:55) ND – CJ Carr 5-yard run, Erik Schmidt kick (Drive: 12 plays, 65 yards, 6:38, Notre Dame 37–9)
- (0:00) PITT – Malachi Thomas 21-yard pass from Eli Holstein (Drive: 12 plays, 79 yards, 2:49, Notre Dame 37–15)

Statistics	ND	PITT
First downs	20	17
Plays–yards	68–387	64–219
Rushes–yards	36–175	25–70
Passing yards	212	149
Passing: comp–att–int	21–32–2	19–39–1
Turnovers	2	1
Time of possession	35:17	24:43

Team	Category	Player	Statistics
Notre Dame	Passing	CJ Carr	21/32, 212 yards, 2 TD, 2 INT
Notre Dame	Rushing	Jeremiyah Love	23 carries, 147 yards, TD
Notre Dame	Receiving	Malachi Fields	7 receptions, 99 yards, 2 TD
Pittsburgh	Passing	Mason Heintschel	16/33, 126 yards, INT
Pittsburgh	Rushing	Juelz Goff	5 carries, 35 yards
Pittsburgh	Receiving	Desmond Reid	6 receptions, 63 yards

=== at No. 16 Georgia Tech ===
Pittsburgh Panthers (7–3) at No. 16 Georgia Tech Yellow Jackets (9–1) – Game summary

Quarter	1	2	3	4	Total
Panthers	21	7	7	7	42
No. 16 Yellow Jackets	0	14	0	14	28

at Bobby Dodd Stadium • Atlanta, GA

- Date: November 22
- Game time: 7:00 p.m. EST
- Game weather:
- Game attendance: 52,413
- Referee: Adam Savoie
- TV announcers (ESPN): Dave Pasch (play-by-play), Dusty Dvoracek (analyst) and Taylor McGregor (sideline)

Game information

First quarter

- PITT – Kenny Johnson 31-yard pass from Mason Heintschel (Sam Carpenter kick), 7:49. Panthers 7–0. Drive: 3 plays, 69 yards, 0:57.
- PITT – Justin Holmes 19-yard pass from Mason Heintschel (Sam Carpenter kick), 3:13. Panthers 14–0. Drive: 6 plays, 55 yards, 2:31.
- PITT – Juelz Goff 1-yard run (Sam Carpenter kick), 0:39. Panthers 21–0. Drive: 4 plays, 28 yards, 1:55.

Second quarter

- PITT – Mason Heintschel 3-yard run (Sam Carpenter kick), 11:47. Panthers 28–0. Drive: 8 plays, 69 yards, 3:13.
- GT – Haynes King 5-yard run (Aidan Birr kick), 4:45. Panthers 28–7. Drive: 15 plays, 75 yards, 6:57.
- GT – Isiah Canion 5-yard pass from Haynes King (Aidan Birr kick), 1:08. Panthers 28–14. Drive: 4 plays, 30 yards, 1:01.

Third quarter

- PITT – Braylan Lovelace 100-yard interception return (Sam Carpenter kick), 5:55. Panthers 35–14.

Fourth quarter

- GT – Jamal Haynes 4-yard run (Aidan Birr kick), 8:46. Panthers 35–21. Drive: 7 plays, 63 yards, 3:10.
- GT – Isiah Canion 5-yard pass from Haynes King (Aidan Birr kick), 4:51. Panthers 35–28. Drive: 6 plays, 38 yards, 2:10.
- PITT – Ja'Kyrian Turner 56-yard run (Sam Carpenter kick), 2:41. Panthers 42–28. Drive: 4 plays, 75 yards, 2:10.

Statistics	PITT	GT
First downs	22	21
Plays–yards	67-412	74-378
Rushes–yards	40-186	33-121
Passing yards	226	257
Passing: comp–att–int	20-27-0	27-41-2
Turnovers	0	2
Time of possession	29:35	30:25

Team	Category	Player	Statistics
Pittsburgh	Passing	Mason Heintschel	20/27, 226 yards, 2 TD
Pittsburgh	Rushing	Ja'Kyrian Turner	21 carries, 201 yards, TD
Pittsburgh	Receiving	Kenny Johnson	6 receptions, 91 yards, TD
Georgia Tech	Passing	Haynes King	27/41, 257 yards, 2 TD, 2 INT
Georgia Tech	Rushing	Haynes King	20 carries, 76 yards, TD
Georgia Tech	Receiving	Malik Rutherford	6 receptions, 68 yards

=== vs No. 12 Miami (FL) ===
No. 12 Miami Hurricanes (9–2) at No. 22 Pittsburgh Panthers (8–3) – Game summary

Quarter	1	2	3	4	Total
No. 12 Hurricanes	3	14	14	7	38
No. 22 Panthers	0	7	0	0	7

at Acrisure Stadium • Pittsburgh, PA

- Date: November 29
- Game time: 12:00 p.m. EST
- Game weather: Sunny • Temperature: 36 °F (2 °C) • Wind: SW 4 mph
- Game attendance: 49,845
- Referee: Riley Johnson
- TV announcers (ABC): Bob Wischusen (play-by-play), Louis Riddick (analyst) and Kris Budden (sideline)

Game information

First quarter

- MIA – Carter Davis 29-yard field goal, 4:31. Hurricanes 3–0. Drive: 9 plays, 54 yards, 3:59.

Second quarter

- PIT – Justin Holmes 6-yard pass from Mason Heintschel (Trey Butkowski kick), 14:20. Panthers 7–3. Drive: 13 plays, 75 yards, 5:11.
- MIA – Elija Lofton 9-yard pass from Malachi Toney (Carter Davis kick), 11:07. Hurricanes 10–7. Drive: 7 plays, 56 yards, 3:07.
- MIA – Malachi Toney 22-yard pass from Carson Beck (Carter Davis kick), 1:55. Hurricanes 17–7. Drive: 9 plays, 75 yards, 4:15.

Third quarter

- MIA – Mark Fletcher 4-yard run (Carter Davis kick), 9:29. Hurricanes 24–7. Drive: 12 plays, 75 yards, 5:26.
- MIA – CharMar Brown 9-yard pass from Carson Beck (Carter Davis kick), 4:28. Hurricanes 31–7. Drive: 6 plays, 59 yards, 3:09.

Fourth quarter

- MIA – CJ Daniels 33-yard pass from Carson Beck (Bert Auburn kick), 0:41. Hurricanes 38–7. Drive: 7 plays, 65 yards, 3:17.

Statistics	MIA	PITT
First downs	28	11
Plays–yards	71–416	54–229
Rushes–yards	39–140	21–30
Passing yards	276	199
Passing: comp–att–int	24–32–1	22–33–1
Turnovers	1	1
Time of possession	35:55	24:05

Team	Category	Player	Statistics
Miami (FL)	Passing	Carson Beck	23/39, 267 yards, 3 TD, INT
Miami (FL)	Rushing	Girard Pringle Jr.	10 carries, 82 yards
Miami (FL)	Receiving	Malachi Toney	13 receptions, 126 yards, TD
Pittsburgh	Passing	Mason Heintschel	22/32, 199 yards, TD, INT
Pittsburgh	Rushing	Ja'Kyrian Turner	10 carries, 37 yards
Pittsburgh	Receiving	Raphael Williams Jr.	5 receptions, 66 yards

=== vs. East Carolina (Military Bowl) ===
2025 Go Bowling Military Bowl
Pittsburgh Panthers (8-4) vs. East Carolina Panthers (8-4) – Game summary

Quarter	1	2	3	4	Total
Panthers	0	7	7	3	17
Pirates	0	3	14	6	23

at Navy-Marine Corps Memorial Stadium • Annapolis, MD

- Date: December 27
- Game time: 11:00 a.m. EST
- Game weather: Cloudy • Temperature: 39 °F (4 °C) • Wind: 13 mph (21 km/h) north
- Game attendance: 17,016
- Referee: Luke Richmond
- TV announcers (ESPN): Jay Alter (play-by-play), Rocky Boiman (analyst), and Madison Fitzpatrick (sideline)
- Box score

Game information

First quarter

- No scoring plays.

Second quarter

- ECU – Nick Mazzie 42-yard field goal, 11:42. Pirates 3–0. Drive: 9 plays, 32 yards, 3:14.
- PITT – Raphael Williams Jr. 22-yard pass from Mason Heintschel (Trey Butkowski kick), 0:04. Panthers 7–3. Drive: 10 plays, 77 yards, 1:36.

Third quarter

- ECU – Anthony Smith 47-yard pass from Chaston Ditta (Nick Mazzie kick), 9:32. Pirates 10–7. Drive: 1 play, 47 yards, 0:07.
- PITT – Rasheem Biles 23-yard fumble return (Trey Butkowski kick), 4:33. Panthers 14–10.
- ECU – Anthony Smith 72-yard pass from Chaston Ditta (Nick Mazzie kick), 3:58. Pirates 17–14. Drive: 2 plays, 75 yards, 0:35.

Fourth quarter

- ECU – Nick Mazzie 33-yard field goal, 14:18. Pirates 20–14. Drive: 7 plays, 19 yards, 3:59.
- ECU – Nick Mazzie 28-yard field goal, 6:41. Pirates 23–14. Drive: 4 plays, 5 yards, 2:07.
- PITT – Trey Butkowski 21-yard field goal, 1:23. Pirates 23–17. Drive: 14 plays, 72 yards, 5:18.

Statistics	PITT	ECU
First downs	24	11
Plays–yards	85–376	59–249
Rushes–yards	40–120	42–72
Passing yards	256	177
Passing: comp–att–int	25–40–1	8–17–0
Turnovers	5	1
Time of possession	33:05	26:55

Team	Category	Player	Statistics
Pittsburgh	Passing	Mason Heintschel	25/40, 256 yards, TD, INT
Pittsburgh	Rushing	Ja'Kyrian Turner	16 carries, 93 yards
Pittsburgh	Receiving	Justin Holmes	6 receptions, 100 yards
East Carolina	Passing	Chaston Ditta	8/17, 177 yards, 2 TD
East Carolina	Rushing	Marlon Gunn Jr.	18 carries, 50 yards
East Carolina	Receiving	Anthony Smith	4 receptions, 156 yards, 2 TD

== Rankings ==
Ranking movements Legend: ██ Increase in ranking ██ Decrease in ranking — = Not ranked RV = Received votes
	Week																
Poll	Pre	1	2	3	4	5	6	7	8	9	10	11	12	13	14	15	Final
AP	RV	RV	RV	—	—	—	—	—	—	RV	RV	23	RV	24	RV	RV	—
Coaches	—	—	RV	—	—	—	—	RV	RV	RV	RV	23	RV	24	RV	RV	RV
CFP	Not released										24	22	—	22	—	—	Not released
