= 2025 East Carolina Pirates football team =

American college football season

2025 East Carolina Pirates football

Military Bowl champion

Military Bowl, W 23–17 vs. Pittsburgh
- Conference: American Conference
- Record: 9–4 (6–2 American)
- Head coach: Blake Harrell (1st season)
- Offensive coordinator: John David Baker (2nd season)
- Offensive scheme: Veer and shoot
- Defensive coordinator: Josh Aldridge (1st season)
- Base defense: Multiple 3–4
- Home stadium: Dowdy–Ficklen Stadium

2025 American Conference football standings
	Conf.			Overall
Team	W		L	W		L
No. 18 Tulane y$^	7	–	1	11	–	3
No. 24 North Texas y	7	–	1	12	–	2
No. 23 Navy	7	–	1	11	–	2
South Florida	6	–	2	9	–	4
East Carolina	6	–	2	9	–	4
Memphis	4	–	4	8	–	5
Army	4	–	4	7	–	6
UTSA	4	–	4	7	–	6
Temple	3	–	5	5	–	7
Florida Atlantic	3	–	5	4	–	8
Rice	2	–	6	5	–	8
UAB	2	–	6	4	–	8
Tulsa	1	–	7	4	–	8
Charlotte	0	–	8	1	–	11
Championship: Tulane 34, North Texas 21
^ – College Football Playoff participant; $ – Conference champion; y – Championship game participant; Rankings from AP Poll

The 2025 East Carolina Pirates football team represented East Carolina University as a member of the American Conference during the 2025 NCAA Division I FBS football season. Led by first-year head coach Blake Harrell, the Pirates played home games at Dowdy–Ficklen Stadium in Greenville, North Carolina.

== Schedule ==
Date	Time	Opponent	Site	TV	Result	Attendance
August 28	7:00 p.m.	at NC State*	Carter–Finley Stadium; Raleigh, NC (rivalry)	ACCN	L 17–24	56,919
September 6	6:00 p.m.	Campbell*	Dowdy–Ficklen Stadium; Greenville, NC	ESPN+	W 56–3	35,120
September 13	7:30 p.m.	at Coastal Carolina*	Brooks Stadium; Conway, SC	ESPN+	W 38–0	21,634
September 20	7:30 p.m.	BYU*	Dowdy–Ficklen Stadium; Greenville, NC	ESPN2	L 13–34	47,213
September 25	7:30 p.m.	Army	Dowdy–Ficklen Stadium; Greenville, NC	ESPN	W 28–6	32,497
October 9	7:30 p.m.	at Tulane	Yulman Stadium; New Orleans, LA	ESPN	L 19–26	20,035
October 16	7:30 p.m.	Tulsa	Dowdy–Ficklen Stadium; Greenville, NC	ESPN	W 41–27	31,307
November 1	2:00 p.m.	at Temple	Lincoln Financial Field; Philadelphia, PA	ESPN+	W 45–14	13,168
November 8	3:00 p.m.	Charlotte^{†}	Dowdy–Ficklen Stadium; Greenville, NC	ESPN+	W 48–22	39,096
November 15	4:00 p.m.	Memphis	Dowdy–Ficklen Stadium; Greenville, NC	ESPNU	W 31–27	37,348
November 22	3:30 p.m.	at UTSA	Alamodome; San Antonio, TX	ESPN+	L 24–58	18,573
November 29	12:00 p.m.	at Florida Atlantic	Flagler Credit Union Stadium; Boca Raton, FL	ESPN+	W 42–3	14,712
December 27	11:00 a.m.	vs. Pittsburgh*	Navy–Marine Corps Memorial Stadium; Annapolis, MD (Military Bowl)	ESPN	W 23–17	17,016
*Non-conference game; ^{†}Homecoming; All times are in Eastern time

== Rankings ==
Ranking movements Legend: ██ Increase in ranking ██ Decrease in ranking — = Not ranked RV = Received votes
	Week																
Poll	Pre	1	2	3	4	5	6	7	8	9	10	11	12	13	14	15	Final
AP	—	—	—	—	—	—	—	—	—	—	—	—	RV	—	—	—	—
Coaches	—	—	—	—	—	—	—	—	—	—	RV	RV	RV	—	—	—	RV
CFP	Not released										—	—	—	—	—	—	Not released

== Game summaries ==
=== at NC State (rivalry) ===
East Carolina Pirates (0–0) at NC State Wolfpack (0–0) – Game summary

Quarter	1	2	3	4	Total
Pirates	0	7	0	10	17
Wolfpack	3	14	7	0	24

at Carter–Finley Stadium • Raleigh, NC

- Date: August 28
- Game time: 7:00 p.m. EDT
- Game weather: Sunny • Temperature: 79 °F (26 °C) • Wind: W at 2 miles per hour (3.2 km/h)
- Game attendance: 56,919
- Referee: Charles Lamertina
- TV announcers (ACC Network): Wes Durham (play-by-play), Steve Addazio (analyst) and Dana Boyle (sideline)

Game information

First quarter

- (8:34) NCSU – Nick Konieczynski 29-yard field goal (Drive: 15 plays, 64 yards, 6:26; NC State 3–0)

Second quarter

- (13:33) NCSU – CJ Bailey 11-yard run, Nick Konieczynski kick (Drive: 7 plays, 61 yards, 3:31; NC State 10–0)
- (11:03) NCSU – Wesley Grimes 48-yard pass from CJ Bailey, Nick Konieczynski kick (Drive: 2 plays, 48 yards, 0:42; NC State 17–0)
- (2:21) ECU – Jayvontay Conner 79-yard pass from Katin Houser, Nick Mazzie kick (Drive: 6 plays, 86 yards, 1:43; NC State 17–7)

Third quarter

- (3:43) NCSU – Hollywood Smothers 2-yard run, Nick Konieczynski kick (Drive: 10 plays, 80 yards, 4:53; NC State 24–7)

Fourth quarter

- (14:56) ECU – Marlon Gunn Jr. 4-yard run, Nick Mazzie kick (Drive: 9 plays, 72 yards, 3:42; NC State 24–14)
- (8:32) ECU – Nick Mazzie 34-yard field goal (Drive: 9 plays, 61 yards, 3:51; NC State 24–17)

Statistics	ECU	NCSU
First downs	18	21
Plays–yards	73–436	67–428
Rushes–yards	28–53	33–110
Passing yards	383	318
Passing: comp–att–int	31–45–0	24–34–1
Turnovers	0	1
Time of possession	27:53	32:07

Team	Category	Player	Statistics
East Carolina	Passing	Katin Houser	30/44, 366 yards, TD
East Carolina	Rushing	London Montgomery	8 carries, 32 yards
East Carolina	Receiving	Jayvontay Conner	2 receptions, 98 yards, TD
NC State	Passing	CJ Bailey	24/34, 318 yards, TD, INT
NC State	Rushing	Hollywood Smothers	22 carries, 76 yards, TD
NC State	Receiving	Wesley Grimes	4 receptions, 121 yards, TD

=== Campbell (FCS) ===
Campbell Fighting Camels (FCS) (0–1) at East Carolina Pirates (0–1) – Game summary

Quarter	1	2	3	4	Total
Fighting Camels (FCS)	0	3	0	0	3
Pirates	14	21	14	7	56

at Dowdy–Ficklen Stadium • Greenville, NC

- Date: September 6
- Game time: 6:00 p.m. EDT
- Game weather: Sunny • Temperature: 91 °F (33 °C) • Wind: S at 8 miles per hour (13 km/h)
- Game attendance: 35,120
- Referee: Zachary Erdmann
- TV announcers (ESPN+): Joe Tordy (play-by-play) and Doc Holliday (analyst)

Game information

First quarter

- (12:32) ECU – Desirrio Riles 18-yard pass from Katin Houser, Andrew Conrad kick (Drive: 8 plays, 75 yards, 2:28; East Carolina 7–0)
- (6:21) ECU – London Montgomery 1-yard run, Andrew Conrad kick (Drive: 10 plays, 73 yards, 3:21; East Carolina 14–0)

Second quarter

- (12:58) CAM – Alex Crabb 29-yard field goal (Drive: 19 plays, 85 yards, 8:23; East Carolina 14–3)
- (11:50) ECU – Brock Spalding 55-yard pass from Katin Houser, Andrew Conrad kick (Drive: 5 plays, 75 yards, 1:08; East Carolina 21–3)
- (5:59) ECU – Parker Jenkins 17-yard run, Andrew Conrad kick (Drive: 4 plays, 30 yards, 1:18; East Carolina 28–3)
- (1:22) ECU – Marlon Gunn Jr. 4-yard run, Andrew Conrad kick (Drive: 12 plays, 46 yards, 2:52; East Carolina 35–3)

Third quarter

- (10:44) ECU – London Montgomery 2-yard run, Andrew Conrad kick (Drive: 7 plays, 32 yards, 2:37; East Carolina 42–3)
- (3:00) ECU – DeJuan Lacy 4-yard run, Noah Perez kick (Drive: 12 plays, 83 yards, 4:10; East Carolina 49–3)

Fourth quarter

- (2:45) ECU – Dillon Lorick 11-yard pass from Chaston Ditta, Noah Perez kick (Drive: 6 plays, 66 yards, 2:18; East Carolina 56–3)

Statistics	CAM	ECU
First downs	14	27
Plays–yards	63–151	81–535
Rushes–yards	27–4	37–172
Passing yards	147	363
Passing: comp–att–int	22–36–0	31–44–0
Turnovers	2	0
Time of possession	32:16	27:44

Team	Category	Player	Statistics
Campbell	Passing	Kamden Sixkiller	18/25, 121 yards
Campbell	Rushing	JJ Cowan	5 carries, 19 yards
Campbell	Receiving	Randall King	2 receptions, 34 yards
East Carolina	Passing	Katin Houser	25/35, 314 yards, 2 TD
East Carolina	Rushing	TJ Engleman Jr.	5 carries, 36 yards
East Carolina	Receiving	Brock Spalding	3 receptions, 81 yards, TD

=== at Coastal Carolina ===
East Carolina Pirates (1–1) at Coastal Carolina Chanticleers (1–1) – Game summary

Quarter	1	2	3	4	Total
Pirates	10	0	7	21	38
Chanticleers	0	0	0	0	0

at Brooks Stadium • Conway, SC

- Date: September 13
- Game time: 7:30 p.m. EDT
- Game weather: Cloudy • Temperature: 74 °F (23 °C) • Wind: NE at 13 miles per hour (21 km/h)
- Game attendance: 21,634
- Referee: Tim Rich
- TV announcers (ESPN+): Sam Weiderhaft (play-by-play), Ricky Sapp (analyst) and Haley Nitsche (sideline)

Game information

First quarter

- (7:26) ECU – Yannick Smith 5-yard pass from Katin Houser, Nick Mazzie kick (Drive: 9 plays, 69 yards, 3:42; East Carolina 7–0)
- (1:44) ECU – Nick Mazzie 36-yard field goal (Drive: 11 plays, 52 yards, 4:11; East Carolina 10–0)

Second quarter

- No scoring plays.

Third quarter

- (8:15) ECU – Parker Jenkins 4-yard run, Nick Mazzie kick (Drive: 6 plays, 45 yards, 1:36; East Carolina 17–0)

Fourth quarter

- (13:04) ECU – Yannick Smith 4-yard pass from Katin Houser, Nick Mazzie kick (Drive: 10 plays, 59 yards, 3:51; East Carolina 24–0)
- (8:32) ECU – Mike Wright 18-yard run, Nick Mazzie kick (Drive: 4 plays, 56 yards, 2:15; East Carolina 31–0)
- (4:08) ECU – TJ Engleman Jr. 1-yard run, Nick Mazzie kick (Drive: 5 plays, 35 yards, 0:57; East Carolina 38–0)

Statistics	ECU	CCU
First downs	29	18
Plays–yards	86–497	65–239
Rushes–yards	49–204	26–67
Passing yards	293	172
Passing: comp–att–int	28–37–1	19–39–2
Turnovers	1	5
Time of possession	33:55	26:05

Team	Category	Player	Statistics
East Carolina	Passing	Katin Houser	28/37, 293 yards, 2 TD, INT
East Carolina	Rushing	London Montgomery	15 carries, 59 yards
East Carolina	Receiving	Anthony Smith	11 receptions, 136 yards
Coastal Carolina	Passing	Tad Hudson	19/39, 172 yards, 2 INT
Coastal Carolina	Rushing	Ja'Vin Simpkins; Jevon Edwards	4 carries, 25 yards
Coastal Carolina	Receiving	Robby Washington	3 receptions, 54 yards

=== BYU ===
BYU Cougars (2–0) at East Carolina Pirates (2–1) – Game summary

Quarter	1	2	3	4	Total
Cougars	3	10	7	14	34
Pirates	3	0	3	7	13

at Dowdy–Ficklen Stadium • Greenville, NC

- Date: September 20
- Game time: 7:30 p.m. EDT
- Game weather: Clear • Temperature: 75 °F (24 °C) • Wind: N at 3 miles per hour (4.8 km/h)
- Game attendance: 47,213
- Referee: Cravonne Barrett
- TV announcers (ESPN2): Lowell Galindo (play-by-play), Aaron Murray (analyst) and Lauren Sisler (sideline)

Game information

First quarter

- (9:58) BYU – Will Ferrin 40-yard field goal (Drive: 8 plays, 38 yards, 3:44; BYU 3–0)
- (0:18) ECU – Nick Mazzie 36-yard field goal (Drive: 5 plays, 36 yards, 1:35; Tied 3–3)

Second quarter

- (10:50) BYU – Will Ferrin 23-yard field goal (Drive: 9 plays, 74 yards, 4:18; BYU 6–3)
- (0:56) BYU – Evan Johnson 4-yard interception return, Will Ferrin kick (BYU 13–3)

Third quarter

- (6:33) BYU – Carsen Ryan 20-yard pass from Bear Bachmeier, Will Ferrin kick (Drive: 2 plays, 47 yards, 0:49; BYU 20–3)
- (2:27) ECU – Nick Mazzie 25-yard field goal (Drive: 14 plays, 68 yards, 4:06; BYU 20–6)

Fourth quarter

- (12:29) BYU – Bear Bachmeier 16-yard run, Will Ferrin kick (Drive: 8 plays, 52 yards, 4:51; BYU 27–6)
- (8:11) ECU – Katin Houser 2-yard run, Nick Mazzie kick (Drive: 12 plays, 97 yards, 4:18; BYU 27–13)
- (3:44) BYU – LJ Martin 41-yard run, Will Ferrin kick (Drive: 9 plays, 75 yards, 4:27; BYU 34–13)

Statistics	BYU	ECU
First downs	20	24
Plays–yards	60–418	76–404
Rushes–yards	34–172	34–113
Passing yards	246	285
Passing: comp–att–int	18–26–0	25–42–2
Turnovers	0	2
Time of possession	31:39	28:21

Team	Category	Player	Statistics
BYU	Passing	Bear Bachmeier	18/25, 246 yards, TD
BYU	Rushing	LJ Martin	14 carries, 101 yards, TD
BYU	Receiving	Chase Roberts	5 receptions, 97 yards
East Carolina	Passing	Katin Houser	25/42, 285 yards, 2 INT
East Carolina	Rushing	London Montgomery	6 carries, 43 yards
East Carolina	Receiving	Yannick Smith	9 receptions, 146 yards

=== Army ===
Army Black Knights (1–2) at East Carolina Pirates (2–2) – Game summary

Quarter	1	2	3	4	Total
Black Knights	0	0	6	0	6
Pirates	21	0	0	7	28

at Dowdy–Ficklen Stadium • Greenville, NC

- Date: September 25
- Game time: 7:30 p.m. EDT
- Game attendance: 32,497
- Referee: Kevin Randall
- TV announcers (ESPN): Matt Barrie (play-by-play), Tom Luginbill (analyst) and Harry Lyles Jr. (sideline)

Game information

First quarter

- (12:07) ECU – Katin Houser 3-yard run, Nick Mazzie kick (Drive: 9 plays, 75 yards, 2:53; East Carolina 7–0)
- (8:22) ECU – Anthony Smith 40-yard pass from Katin Houser, Nick Mazzie kick (Drive: 6 plays, 70 yards, 2:12; East Carolina 14–0)
- (0:39) ECU – Jayvontay Conner 20-yard pass from Katin Houser, Nick Mazzie kick (Drive: 9 plays, 71 yards, 2:37; East Carolina 21–0)

Second quarter

- No scoring plays.

Third quarter

- (10:32) ARMY – Dewayne Coleman 2-yard run, run failed (Drive: 8 plays, 75 yards, 4:28; East Carolina 21–6)

Fourth quarter

- (8:14) ECU – Kyler Pearson 32-yard run, Nick Mazzie kick (Drive: 7 plays, 67 yards, 2:22; East Carolina 28–6)

Statistics	ARMY	ECU
First downs	12	23
Plays–yards	65–290	72–431
Rushes–yards	53–241	50–180
Passing yards	49	251
Passing: comp–att–int	6–12–0	15–22–1
Turnovers	1	2
Time of possession	34:02	25:58

Team	Category	Player	Statistics
Army	Passing	Dewayne Coleman	5/9, 36 yards
Army	Rushing	Noah Short	11 carries, 127 yards
Army	Receiving	Samari Howard	2 receptions, 26 yards
East Carolina	Passing	Katin Houser	15/22, 251 yards, 2 TD, INT
East Carolina	Rushing	London Montgomery	15 carries, 58 yards
East Carolina	Receiving	Anthony Smith	3 receptions, 87 yards, TD

=== at Tulane ===
East Carolina Pirates (3–2) at Tulane Green Wave (4–1) – Game summary

Quarter	1	2	3	4	Total
Pirates	0	0	16	3	19
Green Wave	3	9	0	14	26

at Yulman Stadium • New Orleans, LA

- Date: October 9
- Game time: 7:30 p.m. EDT
- Game weather: Sunny • Temperature: 85 °F (29 °C) • Wind: NE at 8 miles per hour (13 km/h)
- Game attendance: 20,035
- Referee: Edwin Lee
- TV announcers (ESPN): Matt Barrie (play-by-play), Tom Luginbill (analyst) and Harry Lyles Jr. (sideline)

Game information

First quarter

- (10:40) TULN – Patrick Durkin 30-yard field goal (Drive: 8 plays, 28 yards, 2:30; Tulane 3–0)

Second quarter

- (13:37) TULN – Patrick Durkin 29-yard field goal (Drive: 9 plays, 59 yards, 4:52; Tulane 6–0)
- (5:05) TULN – Patrick Durkin 21-yard field goal (Drive: 10 plays, 57 yards, 5:45; Tulane 9–0)
- (0:36) TULN – Patrick Durkin 40-yard field goal (Drive: 8 plays, 41 yards, 1:32; Tulane 12–0)

Third quarter

- (11:54) ECU – Brock Spalding 7-yard pass from Katin Houser, Nick Mazzie kick (Drive: 6 plays, 70 yards, 1:55; Tulane 12–7)
- (2:43) ECU – Katin Houser 10-yard run (Drive: 15 plays, 57 yards, 6:03; East Carolina 13–12)
- (0:45) ECU – Nick Mazzie 46-yard field goal (Drive: 4 plays, 3 yards, 1:57; East Carolina 16–12)

Fourth quarter

- (10:51) TULN – Zycarl Lewis Jr. 63-yard pass from Jake Retzlaff, Patrick Durkin kick (Drive: 1 play, 63 yards, 0:10; Tulane 19–16)
- (5:48) ECU – Nick Mazzie 26-yard field goal (Drive: 13 plays, 67 yards, 5:03; Tied 19–19)
- (0:35) TULN – Javin Gordon 4-yard pass from Jake Retzlaff, Patrick Durkin kick (Drive: 12 plays, 75 yards, 5:13; Tulane 26–19)

Statistics	ECU	TULN
First downs	22	24
Plays–yards	73–340	62–458
Rushes–yards	43–160	25–96
Passing yards	180	362
Passing: comp–att–int	19–30–0	27–37–0
Turnovers	0	1
Time of possession	30:37	29:23

Team	Category	Player	Statistics
East Carolina	Passing	Katin Houser	19/30, 180 yards, TD
East Carolina	Rushing	Marlon Gunn Jr.	10 carries, 52 yards
East Carolina	Receiving	Anthony Smith	2 receptions, 54 yards
Tulane	Passing	Jake Retzlaff	26/36, 347 yards, 2 TD
Tulane	Rushing	Javin Gordon	10 carries, 34 yards
Tulane	Receiving	Zycarl Lewis Jr.	2 receptions, 75 yards, TD

=== Tulsa ===
Tulsa Golden Hurricane (2–4) at East Carolina Pirates (3–3) – Game summary

Quarter	1	2	3	4	Total
Golden Hurricane	7	7	3	10	27
Pirates	10	14	7	10	41

at Dowdy–Ficklen Stadium • Greenville, NC

- Date: October 16
- Game time: 7:30 p.m. EDT
- Game weather: Clear • Temperature: 57 °F (14 °C)
- Game attendance: 31,307
- Referee: Steven Anderson
- TV announcers (ESPN): Matt Barrie (play-by-play), Tom Luginbill (analyst) and Harry Lyles Jr. (sideline)

Game information

First quarter

- (10:52) ECU – Nick Mazzie 37-yard field goal (Drive: 11 plays, 33 yards, 2:36; East Carolina 3–0)
- (5:08) ECU – Anthony Smith 66-yard pass from Katin Houser, Nick Mazzie kick (Drive: 2 plays, 76 yards, 0:35; East Carolina 10–0)
- (2:44) TLSA – Brody Foley 38-yard pass from Baylor Hayes, Seth Morgan kick (Drive: 7 plays, 72 yards, 2:20; East Carolina 10–7)

Second quarter

- (14:57) ECU – Marlon Gunn Jr. 1-yard run, Nick Mazzie kick (Drive: 9 plays, 75 yards, 2:47; East Carolina 17–7)
- (11:51) TLSA – Brody Foley 38-yard pass from Baylor Hayes, Seth Morgan kick (Drive: 7 plays, 78 yards, 3:01; East Carolina 17–14)
- (9:33) ECU – Anthony Smith 63-yard pass from Katin Houser, Nick Mazzie kick (Drive: 7 plays, 84 yards, 2:13; East Carolina 24–14)

Third quarter

- (13:09) ECU – London Montgomery 51-yard run, Nick Mazzie kick (Drive: 1 play, 51 yards, 0:09; East Carolina 31–14)
- (7:12) TLSA – Seth Morgan 46-yard field goal (Drive: 10 plays, 25 yards, 3:47; East Carolina 31–17)

Fourth quarter

- (14:47) TLSA – Stephen Kittleman 1-yard run, Seth Morgan kick (Drive: 8 plays, 65 yards, 2:32; East Carolina 31–24)
- (10:51) ECU – Nick Mazzie 32-yard field goal (Drive: 11 plays, 61 yards, 3:56; East Carolina 34–24)
- (5:22) ECU – Katin Houser 2-yard run, Nick Mazzie kick (Drive: 8 plays, 41 yards, 3:13; East Carolina 41–24)
- (1:49) TLSA – Seth Morgan 26-yard field goal (Drive: 11 plays, 33 yards, 2:36; East Carolina 41–27)

Statistics	TLSA	ECU
First downs	21	27
Plays–yards	83–398	91–568
Rushes–yards	42–147	53–268
Passing yards	251	300
Passing: comp–att–int	23–41–0	21–38–0
Turnovers	0	0
Time of possession	30:56	28:36

Team	Category	Player	Statistics
Tulsa	Passing	Baylor Hayes	23/41, 251 yards, 2 TD
Tulsa	Rushing	Dominic Richardson	17 carries, 59 yards
Tulsa	Receiving	Zion Booker	9 receptions, 55 yards, TD
East Carolina	Passing	Katin Houser	21/38, 300 yards, 2 TD
East Carolina	Rushing	London Montgomery	16 carries, 125 yards, TD
East Carolina	Receiving	Anthony Smith	4 receptions, 150 yards, 2 TD

=== at Temple ===
East Carolina Pirates (4–3) at Temple Owls (5–3) – Game summary

Quarter	1	2	3	4	Total
Pirates	14	14	14	3	45
Owls	7	7	0	0	14

at Lincoln Financial Field • Philadelphia, PA

- Date: November 1
- Game time: 2:00 p.m. EDT
- Game weather: Cloudy • Temperature: 59 °F (15 °C) • Wind: W at 12 miles per hour (19 km/h)
- Game attendance: 13,168
- Referee: Reid Jackson
- TV announcers (ESPN+): Bill Spaulding (play-by-play), Barrett Brooks (analyst) and Maria Trivelpiece (sideline)

Game information

First quarter

- (13:08) ECU – Yannick Smith 7-yard pass from Katin Houser, Nick Mazzie kick (Drive: 6 plays, 75 yards, 1:52; East Carolina 7–0)
- (9:32) ECU – Anthony Smith 45-yard run, Nick Mazzie kick (Drive: 1 play, 45 yards, 0:08; East Carolina 14–0)
- (4:31) TEM – Jay Ducker 4-yard run, Carl Hardin kick (Drive: 4 plays, 27 yards, 2:15; East Carolina 14–7)

Second quarter

- (11:24) TEM – Keveun Mason 29-yard run, Carl Hardin kick (Drive: 9 plays, 75 yards, 4:32; Tied 14–14)
- (6:15) ECU – Mike Wright Jr. 15-yard run, Nick Mazzie kick (Drive: 12 plays, 73 yards, 5:05; East Carolina 21–14)
- (2:59) ECU – Yannick Smith 59-yard pass from Katin Houser, Nick Mazzie kick (Drive: 3 plays, 73 yards, 0:44; East Carolina 28–14)

Third quarter

- (8:42) ECU – London Montgomery 19-yard run, Nick Mazzie kick (Drive: 10 plays, 76 yards, 4:48; East Carolina 35–14)
- (3:52) ECU – Marlon Gunn Jr. 1-yard run, Nick Mazzie kick (Drive: 8 plays, 97 yards, 2:07; East Carolina 42–14)

Fourth quarter

- (12:06) ECU – Nick Mazzie 46-yard field goal (Drive: 11 plays, 45 yards, 4:47; East Carolina 45–14)

Statistics	ECU	TEM
First downs	26	11
Plays–yards	75–614	55–233
Rushes–yards	51–358	30–82
Passing yards	256	151
Passing: comp–att–int	19–24–1	15–25–1
Turnovers	2	1
Time of possession	31:27	28:33

Team	Category	Player	Statistics
East Carolina	Passing	Katin Houser	19/24, 256 yards, 2 TD, INT
East Carolina	Rushing	London Montgomery	14 carries, 84 yards, TD
East Carolina	Receiving	Yannick Smith	5 receptions, 100 yards, 2 TD
Temple	Passing	Evan Simon	11/20, 80 yards, INT
Temple	Rushing	Jay Ducker	15 carries, 45 yards, TD
Temple	Receiving	Colin Chase	5 receptions, 57 yards

=== Charlotte ===
Charlotte 49ers (1–7) at East Carolina Pirates (5–3) – Game summary

Quarter	1	2	3	4	Total
49ers	0	14	8	0	22
Pirates	21	14	10	3	48

at Dowdy–Ficklen Stadium • Greenville, NC

- Date: November 8
- Game time: 3:00 p.m. EST
- Game weather: Sunny • Temperature: 74 °F (23 °C) • Wind: at 0 miles per hour (0 km/h)
- Game attendance: 39,096
- Referee: Steven Anderson
- TV announcers (ESPN+): Patrick Kinas (play-by-play), Reginald Walker Jr. (analyst) and Savanna Collins (sideline)

Game information

First quarter

- (10:03) ECU – London Montgomery 7-yard run, Nick Mazzie kick (Drive: 12 plays, 65 yards, 4:53; East Carolina 7–0)
- (4:53) ECU – Anthony Smith 3-yard pass from Katin Houser, Nick Mazzie kick (Drive: 9 plays, 51 yards, 3:37; East Carolina 14–0)
- (1:22) ECU – TyMir Brown 45-yard interception return, Nick Mazzie kick (East Carolina 21–0)

Second quarter

- (11:58) ECU – Katin Houser 1-yard run, Nick Mazzie kick (Drive: 8 plays, 68 yards, 2:55; East Carolina 28–0)
- (6:52) CLT – Javen Nicholas 46-yard pass from Grayson Loftis, Liam Boyd kick (Drive: 4 plays, 49 yards, 1:03; East Carolina 28–7)
- (2:24) ECU – Yannick Smith 8-yard pass from Katin Houser, Nick Mazzie kick (Drive: 14 plays, 75 yards, 4:29; East Carolina 35–7)
- (1:31) CLT – Sean Brown 4-yard pass from Grayson Loftis, Liam Boyd kick (Drive: 7 plays, 75 yards, 0:53; East Carolina 35–14)

Third quarter

- (11:00) ECU – Nick Mazzie 40-yard field goal (Drive: 6 plays, 12 yards, 2:26; East Carolina 38–14)
- (8:54) CLT – Javen Nicholas 43-yard pass from Grayson Loftis, Grayson Loftis pass (Drive: 5 plays, 75 yards, 2:06; East Carolina 38–22)
- (6:33) ECU – Katin Houser 11-yard run, Nick Mazzie kick (Drive: 6 plays, 75 yards, 2:16; East Carolina 45–22)

Fourth quarter

- (13:21) ECU – Nick Mazzie 50-yard field goal (Drive: 6 plays, 23 yards, 1:39; East Carolina 48–22)

Statistics	CLT	ECU
First downs	13	29
Plays–yards	64–324	88–407
Rushes–yards	28–40	44–183
Passing yards	284	224
Passing: comp–att–int	21–36–1	26–44–0
Turnovers	2	1
Time of possession	25:58	34:02

Team	Category	Player	Statistics
Charlotte	Passing	Grayson Loftis	20/31, 279 yards, 3 TD, INT
Charlotte	Rushing	Cameren Smith	5 carries, 35 yards
Charlotte	Receiving	Sean Brown	7 receptions, 119 yards, TD
East Carolina	Passing	Katin Houser	26/41, 224 yards, 2 TD
East Carolina	Rushing	London Montgomery	11 carries, 85 yards, TD
East Carolina	Receiving	Anthony Smith	8 receptions, 69 yards, TD

=== Memphis ===
Memphis Tigers (8–2) at East Carolina Pirates (6–3) – Game summary

Quarter	1	2	3	4	Total
Tigers	0	17	7	3	27
Pirates	7	3	14	7	31

at Dowdy–Ficklen Stadium • Greenville, NC

- Date: November 15
- Game time: 4:00 p.m. EST
- Game weather: Sunny • Temperature: 72 °F (22 °C) • Wind: SW at 11 miles per hour (18 km/h)
- Game attendance: 37,348
- Referee: Kevin Randall
- TV announcers (ESPNU): Matt Schumacker (play-by-play) and Dustin Fox (analyst)

Game information

First quarter

- ECU – London Montgomery 1-yard run (Nick Mazzie kick), 2:36. Pirates 7–0. Drive: 12 plays, 91 yards, 4:10.

Second quarter

- MEM – Matt Adcock 5-yard pass from Brendon Lewis (Gianni Spetic kick), 12:50. Tied 7–7. Drive: 10 plays, 75 yards, 4:46.
- MEM – Sutton Smith 84-yard run (Gianni Spetic kick), 5:30. Tigers 14–7. Drive: 1 play, 84 yards, 0:13.
- ECU – Nick Mazzie 49-yard field goal, 2:19. Tigers 14–10. Drive: 10 plays, 44 yards, 3:12.
- MEM – Gianni Spetic 44-yard field goal, 0:22. Tigers 17–10. Drive: 10 plays, 49 yards, 1:57.

Third quarter

- ECU – Katin Houser 1-yard run (Nick Mazzie kick), 11:59. Tied 17–17. Drive: 7 plays, 74 yards, 2:02.
- MEM – Brendon Lewis 7-yard run (Gianni Spetic kick), 7:36. Tigers 24–17. Drive: 8 plays, 68 yards, 4:23.
- ECU – London Montgomery 23-yard run (Nick Mazzie kick), 5:46. Tied 24–24. Drive: 6 plays, 75 yards, 1:50.

Fourth quarter

- MEM – Gianni Spetic 30-yard field goal, 2:29. Tigers 27–24. Drive: 6 plays, 12 yards, 1:41.
- ECU – Payton Mangrum 31-yard pass from Katin Houser (Nick Mazzie kick), 1:08. Pirates 31–27. Drive: 6 plays, 75 yards, 1:21.

Statistics	MEM	ECU
First downs	24	24
Plays–yards	77–457	72–454
Rushes–yards	33–240	38–122
Passing yards	217	332
Passing: comp–att–int	33–44–1	23–34–0
Turnovers	1	1
Time of possession	35:33	24:27

Team	Category	Player	Statistics
Memphis	Passing	Brendon Lewis	32/43, 209 yards, TD, INT
Memphis	Rushing	Sutton Smith	7 carries, 109 yards, TD
Memphis	Receiving	Cortez Branham Jr.	9 receptions, 79 yards
East Carolina	Passing	Katin Houser	23/34, 332 yards, TD
East Carolina	Rushing	London Montgomery	27 carries, 103 yards, 2 TD
East Carolina	Receiving	Brock Spalding	5 receptions, 88 yards

=== at UTSA ===
East Carolina Pirates (7–3) at UTSA Roadrunners (5–5) – Game summary

Quarter	1	2	3	4	Total
Pirates	0	3	7	14	24
Roadrunners	14	20	10	14	58

at Alamodome • San Antonio, TX

- Date: November 22
- Game time: 3:30 p.m. EST
- Game weather: None (played indoors)
- Game attendance: 18,573
- Referee: Tim Rich
- TV announcers (ESPN+): Ted Emrich (play-by-play) and Taylor McHargue (analyst)

Game information

First quarter

- UTSA – AJ Wilson 11-yard pass from Owen McCown (Michael Petro kick), 10:18. Roadrunners 7–0. Drive: 7 plays, 70 yards, 3:02.
- UTSA – Houston Thomas 5-yard pass from Owen McCown (Michael Petro kick), 5:08. Roadrunners 14–0. Drive: 10 plays, 78 yards, 3:49.

Second quarter

- UTSA – David Amador II 45-yard pass from Owen McCown (Michael Petro kick), 13:56. Roadrunners 21–0. Drive: 3 plays, 59 yards, 1:04.
- UTSA – A'Marion Peterson 8-yard run (Michael Petro kick), 9:31. Roadrunners 28–0. Drive: 6 plays, 49 yards, 3:36.
- UTSA – Michael Petro 25-yard field goal, 3:47. Roadrunners 31–0. Drive: 9 plays, 50 yards, 4:00.
- ECU – Nick Mazzie 32-yard field goal, 0:44. Roadrunners 31–3. Drive: 11 plays, 60 yards, 3:03.
- UTSA – Michael Petro 37-yard field goal, 0:12. Roadrunners 34–3. Drive: 4 plays, 45 yards, 0:32.

Third quarter

- UTSA – DJ Allen Jr. 4-yard pass from Owen McCown (Michael Petro kick), 7:07. Roadrunners 41–3. Drive: 13 plays, 75 yards, 7:53.
- UTSA – Michael Petro 37-yard field goal, 1:59. Roadrunners 44–3. Drive: 8 plays, 19 yards, 4:06.
- ECU – Anthony Smith 50-yard pass from Katin Houser (Nick Mazzie kick), 1:15. Roadrunners 44–10. Drive: 3 plays, 75 yards, 0:44.

Fourth quarter

- UTSA – Jaren Randle 12-yard pass from Owen McCown (Michael Petro kick), 14:53. Roadrunners 51–10. Drive: 3 plays, 46 yards, 1:21.
- ECU – Marlon Gunn Jr. 50-yard run (Katin Houser–Rion Roseborough pass), 12:58. Roadrunners 51–18. Drive: 5 plays, 74 yards, 1:55.
- UTSA – Shad Banks Jr. 21-yard interception return (Michael Petro kick), 10:41. Roadrunners 58–18.
- ECU – Jayvontay Conner 1-yard pass from Katin Houser (pass failed), 7:28. Roadrunners 58–24. Drive: 9 plays, 71 yards, 3:05.

Statistics	ECU	UTSA
First downs	15	27
Plays–yards	65–401	72–458
Rushes–yards	32–158	39–210
Passing yards	243	248
Passing: comp–att–int	19–33–1	24–33–0
Turnovers	3	0
Time of possession	22:31	37:29

Team	Category	Player	Statistics
East Carolina	Passing	Katin Houser	18/32, 241 yards, 2 TD, INT
East Carolina	Rushing	Marlon Gunn Jr.	5 carries, 62 yards, TD
East Carolina	Receiving	Anthony Smith	8 receptions, 143 yards, TD
UTSA	Passing	Owen McCown	24/33, 248 yards, 5 TD
UTSA	Rushing	Will Henderson III	19 carries, 146 yards
UTSA	Receiving	David Amador II	5 receptions, 75 yards, TD

=== at Florida Atlantic ===
East Carolina Pirates (7-4) at Florida Atlantic Owls (4-7) – Game summary

Quarter	1	2	3	4	Total
Pirates	21	21	0	0	42
Owls	3	0	0	0	3

at Flagler Credit Union Stadium • Boca Raton, FL

- Date: November 29
- Game time: 12:00 p.m. EST
- Game attendance: 14,712
- Referee: Edwin Lee
- TV announcers (ESPN+): A.J. Ricketts (play-by-play), Leger Douzable (analyst) and Maria Trivelpiece (sideline)

Game information

First quarter

- ECU – Marlon Gunn Jr. 1-yard run (Nick Mazzie kick), 10:27. Pirates 7–0. Drive: 13 plays, 75 yards, 4:33.
- ECU – Desirrio Riles 27-yard pass from Katin Houser (Nick Mazzie kick), 10:10. Pirates 14–0. Drive: 1 play, 27 yards, 0:09.
- ECU – Brock Spalding 22-yard pass from Katin Houser (Nick Mazzie kick), 7:04. Pirates 21–0. Drive: 6 plays, 84 yards, 2:14.
- FAU – Garrison Smith 33-yard field goal, 1:00. Pirates 21–3. Drive: 4 plays, -5 yards, 1:14.

Second quarter

- ECU – Katin Houser 4-yard run (Nick Mazzie kick), 10:54. Pirates 28–3. Drive: 14 plays, 75 yards, 5:06.
- ECU – Rion Roseborough 1-yard run (Nick Mazzie kick), 3:10. Pirates 35–3. Drive: 10 plays, 61 yards, 5:29.
- ECU – Katin Houser 7-yard run (Nick Mazzie kick), 0:14. Pirates 42–3. Drive: 9 plays, 76 yards, 1:28.

Third quarter

- No scoring plays.

Fourth quarter

- No scoring plays.

Statistics	ECU	FAU
First downs	28	21
Plays–yards	86–512	73–338
Rushes–yards	56–254	22–39
Passing yards	258	299
Passing: comp–att–int	20–30–0	31–51–3
Turnovers	1	5
Time of possession	34:39	25:21

Team	Category	Player	Statistics
East Carolina	Passing	Katin Houser	20/29, 258 yards, 2 TD
East Carolina	Rushing	Marlon Gunn Jr.	14 carries, 130 yards, TD
East Carolina	Receiving	Desirrio Riles	7 receptions, 87 yards, TD
Florida Atlantic	Passing	Caden Veltkamp	19/31, 183 yards, 2 INT
Florida Atlantic	Rushing	Gemari Sands	9 carries, 34 yards
Florida Atlantic	Receiving	Easton Messer	10 receptions, 86 yards

=== vs. Pittsburgh (Military Bowl) ===
2025 Go Bowling Military Bowl
Pittsburgh Panthers (8-4) vs. East Carolina Panthers (8-4) – Game summary

Quarter	1	2	3	4	Total
Panthers	0	7	7	3	17
Pirates	0	3	14	6	23

at Navy-Marine Corps Memorial Stadium • Annapolis, MD

- Date: December 27
- Game time: 11:00 a.m. EST
- Game weather: Cloudy • Temperature: 39 °F (4 °C) • Wind: 13 mph (21 km/h) north
- Game attendance: 17,016
- Referee: Luke Richmond
- TV announcers (ESPN): Jay Alter (play-by-play), Rocky Boiman (analyst), and Madison Fitzpatrick (sideline)
- Box score

Game information

First quarter

- No scoring plays.

Second quarter

- ECU – Nick Mazzie 42-yard field goal, 11:42. Pirates 3–0. Drive: 9 plays, 32 yards, 3:14.
- PITT – Raphael Williams Jr. 22-yard pass from Mason Heintschel (Trey Butkowski kick), 0:04. Panthers 7–3. Drive: 10 plays, 77 yards, 1:36.

Third quarter

- ECU – Anthony Smith 47-yard pass from Chaston Ditta (Nick Mazzie kick), 9:32. Pirates 10–7. Drive: 1 play, 47 yards, 0:07.
- PITT – Rasheem Biles 23-yard fumble return (Trey Butkowski kick), 4:33. Panthers 14–10.
- ECU – Anthony Smith 72-yard pass from Chaston Ditta (Nick Mazzie kick), 3:58. Pirates 17–14. Drive: 2 plays, 75 yards, 0:35.

Fourth quarter

- ECU – Nick Mazzie 33-yard field goal, 14:18. Pirates 20–14. Drive: 7 plays, 19 yards, 3:59.
- ECU – Nick Mazzie 28-yard field goal, 6:41. Pirates 23–14. Drive: 4 plays, 5 yards, 2:07.
- PITT – Trey Butkowski 21-yard field goal, 1:23. Pirates 23–17. Drive: 14 plays, 72 yards, 5:18.

Statistics	PITT	ECU
First downs	24	11
Plays–yards	85–376	59–249
Rushes–yards	40–120	42–72
Passing yards	256	177
Passing: comp–att–int	25–40–1	8–17–0
Turnovers	5	1
Time of possession	33:05	26:55

Team	Category	Player	Statistics
Pittsburgh	Passing	Mason Heintschel	25/40, 256 yards, TD, INT
Pittsburgh	Rushing	Ja'Kyrian Turner	16 carries, 93 yards
Pittsburgh	Receiving	Justin Holmes	6 receptions, 100 yards
East Carolina	Passing	Chaston Ditta	8/17, 177 yards, 2 TD
East Carolina	Rushing	Marlon Gunn Jr.	18 carries, 50 yards
East Carolina	Receiving	Anthony Smith	4 receptions, 156 yards, 2 TD

== Personnel ==
=== Roster ===
2025 East Carolina Pirates football team roster
Players
Coaches
Offense

Pos.	#	Name	Class
WR	1	Yannick Smith	So
QB	2	Raheim Jeter	Jr
WR	3	Kelan Robinson	Sr
QB	4	Katin Houser	Jr
RB	5	Parker Jenkins	Jr
TE	6	Desirrio Riles	Jr
QB	7	Cole Hodge	Fr
RB	7	London Montgomery	So
TE	8	Jayvontay "JC" Conner	So
QB	9	Chaston Ditta	Fr
WR	9	Anthony Smith	GS
WR	10	Brock Spalding	Jr
QB	11	Mike Wright	GS
WR	12	Jaquaize Pettaway	Jr
WR	13	Jason Dickerson	So
WR	13	Tyler Johnson	So
WR	14	Dillon Lorick	Fr
WR	17	Johnny Williams	Fr
WR	19	Payton Mangrum	GS
RB	20	TJ Engleman Jr.	So
RB	21	Marlon Gunn Jr.	Sr
RB	22	Michael Beatty	So
RB	23	Josh Benton	Jr
WR	24	Kyler Pearson	GS
RB	25	Eddie Love Jr.	Fr
RB	26	DaMari Gantt	So
RB	28	DeJuan Lacy	So
TE	45	Mason Brown	Jr
OL	52	Jonathan Stokes	Fr
OL	53	Panda Askew	GS
OL	54	Dru McClough	So
OL	55	Darius Bell	Sr
OL	56	Leivi Semaia	Jr
OL	57	Ian Hemilright	So
OL	60	Zach Caulder	Jr
OL	61	Jayson Tarpeh	Sr
OL	62	Jimarion McCrimon	Jr
OL	66	Marleo Neolien	Jr
OL	67	Peyton Reeder	Fr
OL	68	Trey Hardison	Sr
OL	69	Emmanuel Poku	Jr
OL	71	Bryce Weaver	Jr
OL	72	Jeremiah Williams	Jr
OL	73	Karson Jones	Jr
OL	75	Kyle Long	Sr
OL	76	Jacob Sacra	Jr
OL	77	Cooper Trnavsky	Sr
OL	78	Kendall Walton	Fr
OL	79	Samuel "Sam" Riddy Jr.	Fr
WR	80	Ty Johnson	So
WR	81	Mason Scott	So
WR	81	Jyron Waiters	Fr
TE	82	Gage Reale	Jr
TE	83	Stephen Collier	Fr
WR	84	Connor Hodge	Fr
TE	86	Kaleb Morrow	Fr
TE	87	Cayman Reynolds	Fr
WR	88	Trenton Cloud	Fr
WR	89	Malik Leverett	Jr

Defense

Pos.	#	Name	Class
LB	1	Jackson Barker	Jr
DB	2	Ja'Marley Riddle	So
DB	3	Teagan Wilk	GS
DB	4	Kevon Merrell	So
OLB	5	Ryheem Craig	Sr
DB	6	DeMarius Hines	So
DL	7	Samuel Dankah	Sr
DL	8	Jasiyah Robinson	Sr
DL	9	J. D. Lampley	Sr
LB	10	Dameon Wilson	Sr
LB	11	DJ Johnson Jr.	So
DB	12	Chance Graves	GS
DB	14	Key Crowell	So
DB	15	Jordy Lowery	Jr
DB	17	Rasheed Reason	GS
DB	20	Kamaurri McKinley	Jr
DB	21	Jonathan Akins	So
DB	22	Jonathan Jean	GS
DB	23	Tavius Horne Jr.	Fr
DB	24	TyMir Brown	Sr
LB	25	Noah Holmes	GS
DB	26	Alex Moye	So
DB	27	O'Marion Lewis	Fr
DB	28	Ladarian Paulk	GS
DB	30	Timothy Patterson	Jr
DB	31	Derrion Horsley	Fr
DB	32	Durante Speer	Fr
OLB	33	Luke Holmes	So
DL	35	Kieran Davis	Jr
DB	35	Ayden Duncanson	So
DB	37	Adam Cole	Jr
DB	37	Bernard Lackey Jr.	Fr
DB	38	Miles Gaddy	So
DB	39	Angelo Ross	Fr
DL	40	Kendrick DuJour	Jr
LB	41	Jayden Olden	So
LB	42	Julien Davis	Jr
LB	43	Jordan David Miles	Fr
DL	44	Preston Carr	Jr
DB	45	Jurnee Lattimore	So
LB	46	Reagan Printy	So
LB	47	Kendric Davis	Fr
LB	48	Landon Lewis	Fr
DL	51	Evan Powell	Fr
DL	52	Xavier McIver	Sr
DL	54	Zion Wilson	Sr
DL	55	Dominick Moody	Fr
DL	83	Miles Parker	So
DL	90	Josiah Dwyer	Fr
DL	92	Dylon Worthen	Fr
DL	93	Rion Roseborough	So
DL	94	Javon Williams	Fr
DL	97	Jacoby Martin	So
DL	98	Torin Brazell	Fr
DL	99	Justin Benton	So

Special teams

Pos.	#	Name	Class
K	30	Nick Mazzie	GS
P	37	Ryan Leavy	GS
LS	41	Tripp Smith	Jr
K	43	Noah Perez	Sr
P	48	Tomas O'Halloran	Fr
LS	85	Triston O'Brien	Jr
K	93	Everett Scott	So
K	95	Andrew Conrad	Sr
LS	97	Cole Walker	So

Head coach

- Blake Harrell

Coordinators/assistant coaches

- John David Baker – Offensive coordinator/Quarterbacks
- Josh Aldridge – Defensive coordinator/Linebackers
- Rodney Freeman II – Running backs
- Hunter MacKay – Tight ends
- Damon Magazu – Safeties
- Matt Mattox – Offensive linemen
- Dyrell Roberts – Wide receivers
- Roy Tesh – Defensive linemen/Defensive run game coordinator
- Tarron Williams – Cornerbacks
- Rico Zackery – Outside linebackers
- Aaron Auer – Senior offensive analyst
- Arketa Banks – Senior defensive analyst
- Bryan Butterworth – Senior defensive analyst/Nickels
- Ryan McManus – Senior offensive analyst
- Nicholas Hudgens – Graduate assistant
- Cameron Nichols – Graduate assistant
- Jordan Williams – Graduate assistant
- Mark Hatcher – Recruiting coordinator
- Mason Baggett – Director, Strength and Conditioning

Legend

- (C) Team captain
- (S) Suspended
- (I) Ineligible
- Injured
- Redshirt

Roster
Last update: 7/23/25

=== Transfers ===
==== Outgoing ====
Player	Position	Destination
John David Black	QB	Abilene Christian
Amarie Archer	IOL	Akron
Derick Brazil	DB	Appalachian State
Demoris Jenkins	OLB	Austin Peay
Javious Bond	RB	Austin Peay
Hunt Tatum	LB	Bethune-Cookman
Ethan Stumpf	P	Buffalo
Kameron Durant	IOL	Campbell
Logan Wright	DL	Campbell
No'Tavien Green	S	Louisburg
Melvin Jacobs	WR	Central Connecticut
Keyshawn Jackson	CB	Chattanooga
Shaikh Thompson	OLB	Coastal Carolina
Javion Clark	S	East Tennessee State
Daylyn Diston	CB	Florida A&M
Kerry King	WR	Furman
Tanner Helton	QB	Garden City CC
Jordan Huff	S	Georgia State
McCallum Wright	WR	Hampden–Sydney
Ajani Farmer	DE	Harding
Chase Sowell	WR	Iowa State
Alex Koulovatos	S	Long Beach CC
Kenny Walz	OT	Maine
Jake Garcia	QB	Michigan
Dontavius Nash	CB	Michigan State
CJ Mims	DL	North Carolina
Gavin Gibson	S	North Carolina
Ryan Stephens	WR	North Carolina A&T
Eric Fletcher	CB	Oklahoma State
Tate Smith	LB	Randolph–Macon
Nick Slogik	TE	Rowan Gloucester
Zakye Barker	LB	SMU
Greg Turner	LB	Tennessee Tech
Andrew Wilson-Lamp	CB	Toledo
Jah'Cire Jones	RB	Union
Luke Larsen	P	Villanova
Isaiah Brown-Murray	DB	Virginia Tech
Bryson Harrison	QB	Unknown
Zack Boehly	OT	Unknown
Bleu Coleman	WR	Unknown

==== Incoming ====
Player	Position	Previous school
Zach Caulder	IOL	Averett
Ian Hemilright	IOL	Campbell
Ryan Leavy	P	Duke
Teagan Wilk	S	Houston
Parker Jenkins	RB	Houston
Justin Benton	DL	Houston
Triston O'Brien	LS	Indiana State
Key Crowell	CB	Indianapolis
Kyle Long	IOL	Maryland
Jonathan Akins	CB	Maryland
Nick Mazzie	K	New Hampshire
Cooper Trnavsky	OT	Newberry
Mike Wright	QB	Northwestern
Jaquaize Pettaway	WR	Oklahoma
Kyler Pearson	WR	Oklahoma State
Rasheed Reason	CB	Old Dominion
Tyler Johnson	WR	Penn State
Dru McClough	IOL	Presbyterian
Jonathan Jean	S	Rice
Chance Graves	CB	Richmond
Kendrick DuJour	OLB	Sam Houston
Payton Mangrum	WR	South Carolina
Rion Roseborough	DL	Towson
Xavier McIver	DL	UT Martin
Ladarian Paulk	S	West Florida
Miles Gaddy	S	UNC
Jordy Lowery	CB	Western Carolina
