= Ja'Kyrian Turner =

American football player

No. 25 – Pittsburgh Panthers
- Position: Running back
- Class: Freshman

Personal information
- Listed height: 5 ft 9 in (1.75 m)
- Listed weight: 180 lb (82 kg)

Career information
- High school: South Sumter (Bushnell, Florida)
- College: Pittsburgh (2025–present)
- Stats at ESPN

Ja'Kyrian Turner is an American college football running back for the Pittsburgh Panthers.

== Early life ==
Turner attended South Sumter High School in Bushnell, Florida. As a senior, he recorded 134 carries for 978 yards and ten touchdowns. Following his high school career, Turner committed to play college football at the University of Pittsburgh.

== College career ==
Turner earned immediate playing time as a true freshman. He rushed for his first career touchdown against Central Michigan. Against No. 25 Florida State, Turner rushed for 44 yards and two touchdowns, his first multi-touchdown game of his career.

=== Statistics ===
College statistics
Season	Team	Games	Rushing				Receiving			
Season	Team	GP	Att	Yards	Avg	TD	Rec	Yards	Avg	TD
2025	Pittsburgh	10	114	615	5.4	7	17	131	7.7	0
Career		10	114	615	5.4	7	17	131	7.7	0
