= Mason Heintschel =

American football player

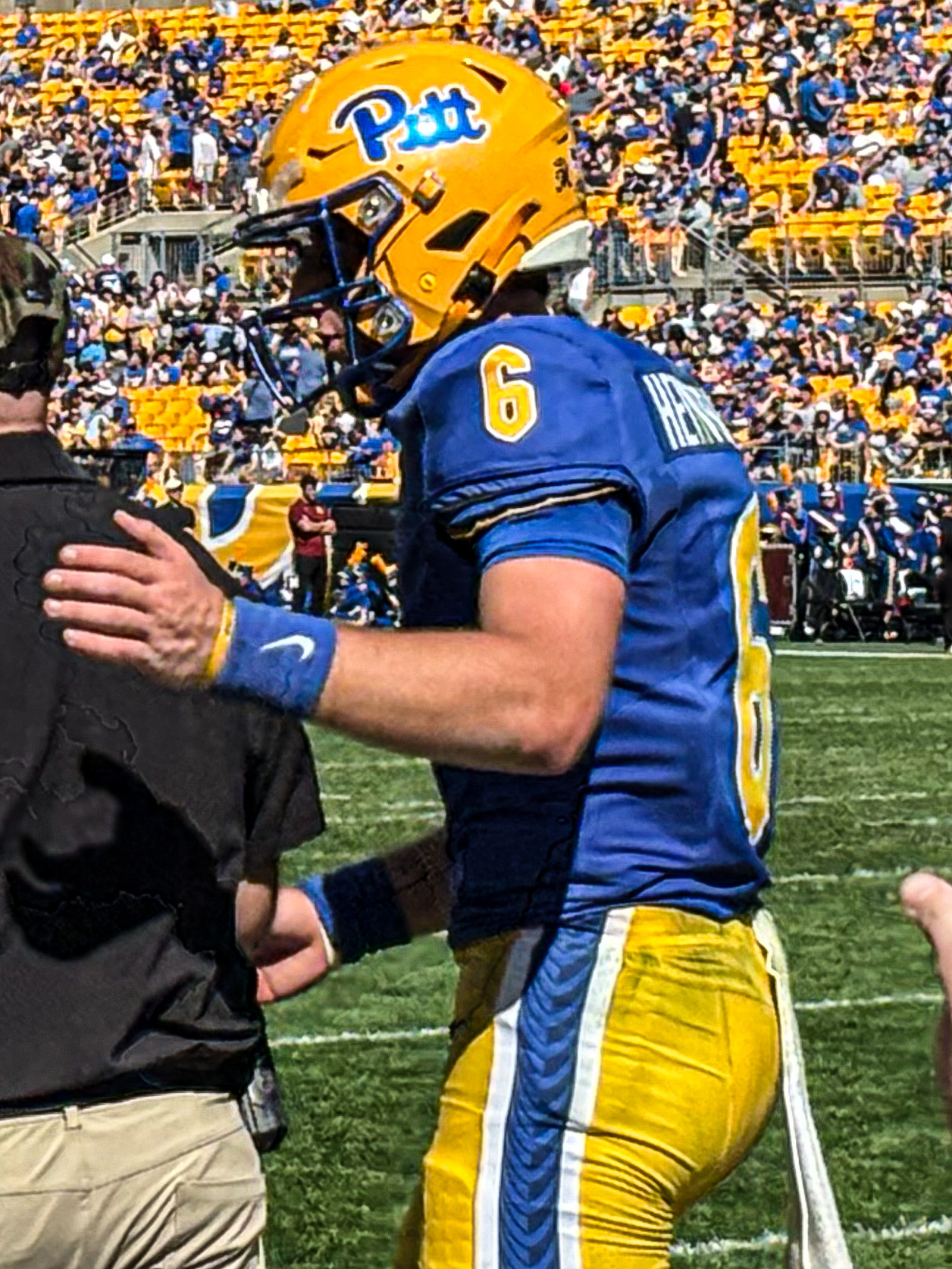
- Heintschel in 2025

No. 6 – Pittsburgh Panthers
- Position: Quarterback
- Class: Sophomore

Personal information
- Born: February 17, 2007 (age 19)
- Listed height: 6 ft 2 in (1.88 m)
- Listed weight: 215 lb (98 kg)

Career information
- High school: Clay (Oregon, Ohio)
- College: Pittsburgh (2025–present)
- Stats at ESPN

Mason Heintschel (born February 17, 2007) is an American football quarterback for the Pittsburgh Panthers.

== Early life ==
Heintschel attended high school at Clay located in Oregon, Ohio. During his high school career he accounted for 8,876 yards in total offense and 102 touchdowns. Coming out of high school, Heintschel was rated as a three-star recruit, and the 44th overall quarterback in the class of 2025, where he committed to play college football for the Pittsburgh Panthers over offers from other schools such as Ohio, Coastal Carolina, and Liberty.

== College career ==
He entered his true freshman season in 2025 competing for the backup quarterback job with Cole Gonzales. In week one of the 2025 season, Heintschel made his collegiate debut, completing three of his four pass attempts for 36 yards in a win over Duquesne. Heading into their week six matchup, Heintschel was named the team's starting quarterback after struggles from Eli Holstein.

On October 2, 2026 against Virginia Tech, Heintschel left early in the 3rd quarter after he suffered a right knee injury. He was later ruled out for the rest of the season with a torn ACL.

=== Statistics ===
Year	Team	Games			Passing								Rushing			
Year	Team	GP	GS	Record	Cmp	Att	Pct	Yds	Y/A	TD	Int	Rtg	Att	Yds	Avg	TD
2025	Pittsburgh	10	9	6−3	201	316	63.6	2,354	7.4	16	8	137.8	86	88	1.0	2
2026	Pittsburgh	5	5	5–0	98	148	66.2	1,304	8.8	14	1	170.1	30	112	3.7	1
Career		15	14	11–3	299	464	64.4	3,658	7.9	30	9	148.1	116	200	1.7	3

== Personal life ==
His father, Eric Heintschel, formerly played baseball for the Michigan Wolverines.
