= Nate Yarnell =

American football player (born 2002)

No. 19 – Texas State Bobcats
- Position: Quarterback
- Class: (redshirt) Senior

Personal information
- Born: October 10, 2002 (age 24)
- Listed height: 6 ft 6 in (1.98 m)
- Listed weight: 215 lb (98 kg)

Career information
- High school: Lake Travis (Austin, Texas)
- College: Pittsburgh (2021–2024); Texas State (2025)
- Stats at ESPN

Nate Yarnell (born October 10, 2002) is an American college football quarterback who plays for the Texas State Bobcats.

== Early life ==
Yarnell attended Lake Travis High School in Austin, Texas. As a junior, he completed 108 of 158 pass attempts for 1,489 yards and 14 touchdowns. Coming out of high school, Yarnell was rated as a three-star recruit and committed to play college football for the Pittsburgh Panthers over offers from schools such as Houston, Nevada, and Utah.

== College career ==
In his first career start in 2022, Yarnell completed nine of 12 pass attempts for 179 yards and a touchdown in a 34–14 win over Western Michigan. He finished the 2022 season completing 10 of 14 passing attempts for 195 yards and a touchdown. In week 13 of the 2023 season, Yarnell completed 11 of 19 passes for 207 yards and a touchdown and rushed for 24 yards and a touchdown in a win over Boston College. In the 2023 season finale versus Duke, he completed 25 of 35 pass attempts for 265 yards, two touchdowns, and an interception. In 2023, Yarnell completed 41 of 62 pass attempts for 595 yards and four touchdowns with one interception. He also added 13 yards and a touchdown on the ground.

On December 6, 2024, Yarnell announced that he would enter the transfer portal.

=== Texas State ===
On December 21, 2024, Yarnell transferred to play for the Texas State Bobcats.

=== College statistics ===
Year	Team	Games			Passing								Rushing			
Year	Team	GP	GS	Record	Comp	Att	Pct	Yards	Avg	TD	Int	Rate	Att	Yards	Avg	TD
2021	Pittsburgh	Redshirt														
2022	Pittsburgh	2	1	1–0	10	14	71.4	195	13.9	1	0	212.0	2	−10	−5.0	0
2023	Pittsburgh	4	2	1–1	41	62	66.1	595	9.6	4	1	164.8	19	13	0.7	1
2024	Pittsburgh	9	2	0–2	98	167	58.7	1,056	6.3	10	5	125.6	35	25	0.7	0
2025	Texas State	0	0	0–0	0	0	0.0	0	0.0	0	0	0.0	0	0	0.0	0
Career		15	5	2–3	81	124	65.3	1,104	8.9	10	3	161.9	56	28	0.5	1
