= Fenway Bowl =

Postseason college football game

- Wasabi Fenway Bowl
- Stadium: Fenway Park
- Location: Boston, Massachusetts
- Operated: 2022–present
- Conference tie-ins: The American, ACC
- Website: fenwaybowl.com

Sponsors
- Wasabi Technologies (2022–present)

2025 matchup
- UConn vs. Army (Army 41–16)

The Fenway Bowl is an NCAA Division I Football Bowl Subdivision college football bowl game played at Fenway Park in Boston, Massachusetts. Organized by ESPN Events and Fenway Sports Management, it features teams from the American Athletic Conference and the Atlantic Coast Conference. The bowl is one of three active bowl games staged in a baseball stadium, along with the Pinstripe Bowl (Yankee Stadium) and Rate Bowl (Chase Field). The Fenway Bowl is one of three contemporary bowl games that have never released payout totals for the teams involved in the game (the Myrtle Beach Bowl and LA Bowl are the others).

== History ==
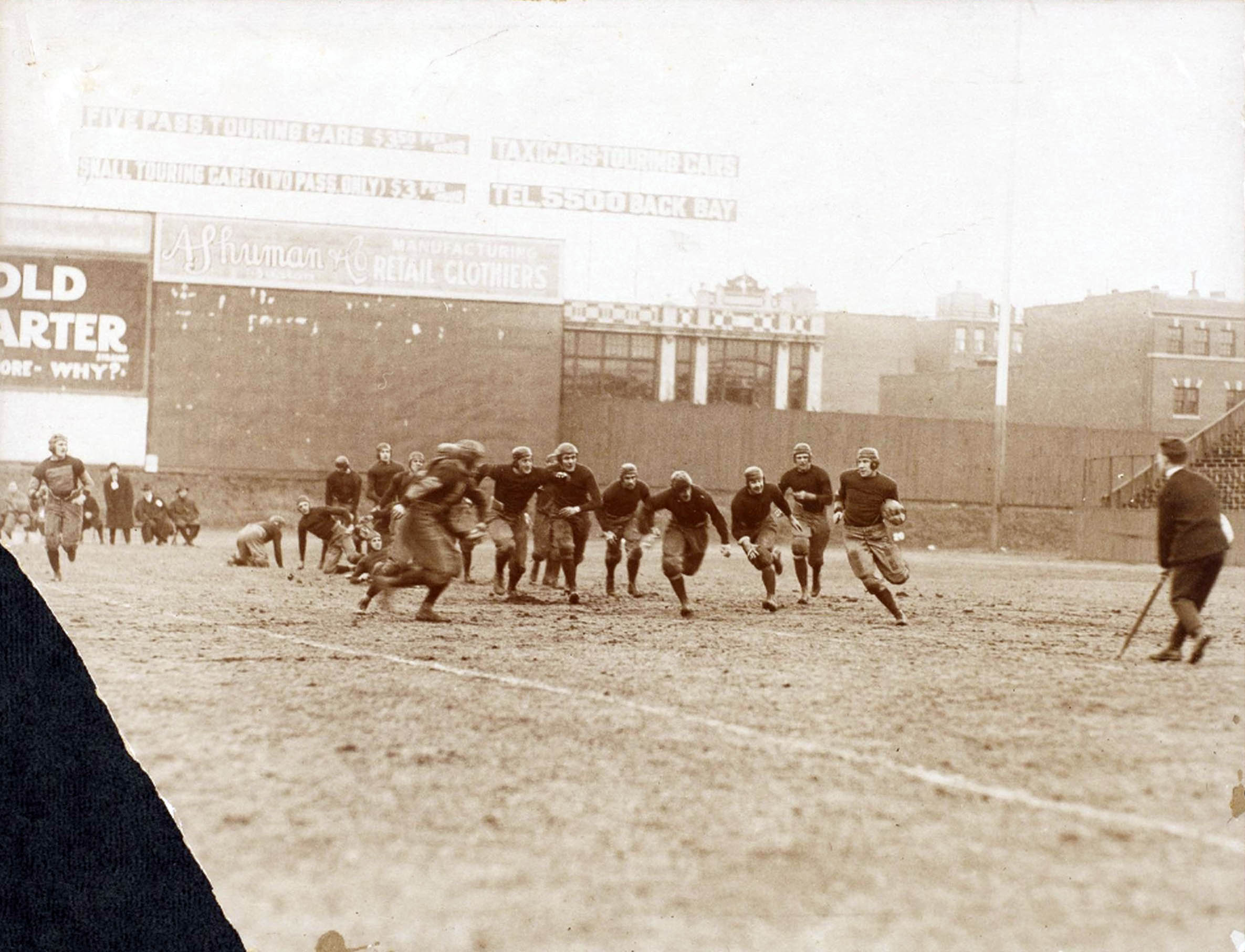
Holy Cross and Boston College playing at Fenway Park in 1916

American football games at Fenway Park date to 1912, the year the venue opened. Various high school, college, and professional football teams have played at Fenway, including the Boston Patriots during the American Football League (AFL) era, and the Boston College Eagles. Prior to the Fenway Bowl, no bowl game had been scheduled for the ballpark.

Organizers had planned for the inaugural playing of the Fenway Bowl to be during the 2020–21 bowl season. On October 23, 2020, it was reported that the bowl would not debut as planned, citing COVID-19 pandemic concerns. Postponement of the bowl was confirmed by organizers the following week, with the temporary Montgomery Bowl being created as a substitute.

On May 27, 2021, organizers announced a game date for the 2021–22 bowl season of December 29, 2021. On November 4, 2021, Wasabi Technologies signed on as the title sponsor of the game. However, the game was canceled three days prior to kickoff due to COVID issues within the Virginia team; they had been set to face SMU.

On December 17, 2022, as part of the 2022–23 bowl season, the Fenway Bowl was played for the first time, featuring Cincinnati and Louisville. The following year, the first ranked team was invited to the bowl, as SMU (17th in the AP poll and 24th in the College Football Playoff rankings) faced Boston College.

== Game results ==
Rankings are based on the AP poll prior to the game being played.

Date	Winning Team		Losing Team		Attendance	Notes / Ref.
December 17, 2022	Louisville	24	Cincinnati	7	15,000	notes
December 28, 2023	Boston College	23	No. 17 SMU	14	16,238	notes
December 28, 2024	UConn	27	North Carolina	14	27,900	notes
December 27, 2025	Army	41	UConn	16	22,461	notes

== MVPs ==
Year	Offensive MVP			Defensive MVP			Ref.
Year	Player	Team	Pos.	Player	Team	Pos.	Ref.
2022	Jawhar Jordan	Louisville	RB	Monty Montgomery	Louisville	LB	
2023	Thomas Castellanos	Boston College	QB	Kam Arnold	Boston College	LB	
2024	Joe Fagnano	UConn	QB	Pryce Yates	UConn	DL	
2025	Godspower Nwawuihe	Army	RB	Kalib Fortner	Army	LB	

== Appearances by team ==
Updated through the December 2025 edition (4 games, 8 total appearances).

Teams with multiple appearances

Rank	Team	Appearances	Record
1	UConn	2	1–1

Teams with a single appearance

Won (3): Army, Boston College, Louisville
Lost (3): Cincinnati, North Carolina, SMU

== Appearances by conference ==
Updated through the December 2025 edition (4 games, 8 total appearances).

Conference	Record				Appearances by season	
Conference	Games	W	L	Win pct.	Won	Lost
ACC	3	2	1	.667	2022, 2023	2024
American	3	1	2	.333	2025	2022, 2023
Independent	2	1	1	.500	2024	2025

Independent appearances: UConn (2024, 2025)

== Game records ==
Team	Performance vs. Opponent	Year
Most points scored (one team)	41, Army vs. UConn	2025
Most points scored (losing team)	16, UConn vs. Army	2025
Most points scored (both teams)	57, Army vs. UConn	2025
Fewest Points Allowed	7, Cincinnati vs. Louisville	2022
Largest margin of victory	25, Army vs. UConn	2025
Total yards	476, Army vs. UConn (108 pass, 368 rush)	2025
Rushing yards	368, Army vs. UConn	2025
Passing yards	151, UConn vs. North Carolina	2024
First downs	24, Louisville vs. Cincinnati	2022
Fewest yards allowed	127, Cincinnati vs. Louisville	2022
Fewest rushing yards allowed	44, Cincinnati vs. Louisville	2022
Fewest passing yards allowed	83, Cincinnati vs. Louisville	2022
Individual	Performance, Team	Year
Total yards	258, Thomas Castellanos (BC)	2023
All-Purpose yards	171, Godspower Nwawuihe (Army) (171 rush)	2025
Touchdowns (all-purpose)	2, shared by: Jawhar Jordan (Louisville); Thomas Castellanos (BC); Godspower Nwawuihe (Army); Cale Hellums (Army)	2022; 2023; 2025; 2025
Rushing yards	171, Godspower Nwawuihe (Army)	2025
Rushing touchdowns	2, shared by: Jawhar Jordan (Louisville); Thomas Castellanos (BC); Godspower Nwawuihe (Army); Cale Hellums (Army)	2022; 2023; 2025; 2025
Passing yards	151, Joe Fagnano (UConn)	2024
Passing touchdowns	2, Joe Fagnano (UConn)	2024
Receptions	7, shared by: Noah Short (Army); Reymello Murphy (UConn)	2025; 2025
Receiving yards	108, Noah Short (Army)	2025
Receiving touchdowns	1, shared by: Wyatt Fischer (Cincinnati); Marshon Ford (Louisville); Jaylan Knighton (SMU); Skyler Bell (UConn); John Copenhaver (North Carolina); Noah Short (Army)	2022; 2022; 2023; 2024; 2024; 2025
Tackles	16, Ivan Pace Jr. (Cincinnati)	2022
Sacks	1.5, shared by: Yasir Abdullah (Louisville); YaYa Diaby (Louisville)	2022
Interceptions	1, shared by: Armorion Smith (Cincinnati); Ja'von Hicks (Cincinnati); Alex Kilgore (SMU); Tui Faumuina-Brown (UConn)	2022; 2022; 2023; 2024
Long Plays	Performance, Team	Year
Touchdown run	70 yds., Godspower Nwawuihe (Army)	2025
Touchdown pass	40 yds., Caleb Hellums to Noah Short (Cincinnati)	2025
Kickoff return	95 yds., Chase Culliver (North Carolina)	2024
Punt return	6 yds., Lewis Bond (Boston College)	2023
Interception return	20 yds., Armorion Smith (Cincinnati)	2022
Fumble return		
Punt	56 yds., Mark Vassett (Louisville)	2022
Field goal	49 yds., Chris Freeman (Connecticut)	2025

== Media coverage ==
The bowl has been televised by ESPN since its inception.
