= 2024 Fenway Bowl =

Postseason college football bowl game

2024 Wasabi Fenway Bowl
- 3rd Fenway Bowl
UConn Huskies	North Carolina Tar Heels
(8–4)	(6–6)
Independent	ACC
27	14
Head coach: Jim L. Mora	Head coach: Freddie Kitchens (interim)
	1	2	3	4	Total
UConn	10	14	3	0	27
North Carolina	7	0	0	7	14
- Date: December 28, 2024
- Season: 2024
- Stadium: Fenway Park
- Location: Boston, Massachusetts
- MVP: Offense: Joe Fagnano (QB, UConn); Defense: Pryce Yates (DL, UConn)
- Favorite: North Carolina by 1.5
- Referee: Patrick Foy (Mountain West)
- Attendance: 27,900

United States TV coverage
- Network: ESPN
- Announcers: Chris Cotter (play-by-play), Mark Herzlich (analyst), and Coley Harvey (sideline)

The 2024 Fenway Bowl was a college football bowl game played on December 28, 2024, at Fenway Park in Boston, Massachusetts. The third edition of the Fenway Bowl game featured UConn and North Carolina. The game started at approximately 11:00 a.m. EST and was aired on ESPN. The Fenway Bowl was one of the 2024–25 bowl games concluding the 2024 FBS football season. The game was sponsored by cloud storage company Wasabi Technologies and was officially known as the Wasabi Fenway Bowl.

== Teams ==
The matchup of UConn and North Carolina was announced on December 8.

=== UConn Huskies ===
UConn, competing as an independent, compiled an 8–4 record, coming off of their first winning season since 2010. The Huskies did not face any ranked teams during the season.

With the win over North Carolina, the Huskies won their first bowl game since the 2010 PapaJohns.com Bowl.

=== North Carolina Tar Heels ===
North Carolina compiled a 6–6 overall record (3–5 in conference play) during the regular season. The Tar Heels started the season with three consecutive wins, lost their next four games, won the next three, and finished with back-to-back losses. They did not face any ranked teams.

== Game summary ==
2024 Wasabi Fenway Bowl

Quarter	1	2	3	4	Total
UConn	10	14	3	0	27
North Carolina	7	0	0	7	14

at Fenway Park • Boston, Massachusetts

- Date: Saturday, December 28, 2024
- Game time: 11:06 a.m. EST
- Game weather: Sunny • Temperature: 38 °F (3 °C) • Wind: 3 mph (4.8 km/h) northeast
- Game attendance: 27,900
- TV announcers (ESPN): Chris Cotter (play-by-play), Mark Herzlich (analyst), and Coley Harvey (sideline)
- Box score

Game information

First Quarter

- (10:46) CONN – Chris Freeman 32 yard field goal (Drive: 8 plays, 61 yards, 4:14; UConn 3–0)
- (3:45) CONN – Skyler Bell 38 yard pass from Joe Fagnano, Chris Freeman kick (Drive: 2 plays, 51 yards, 0:31; UConn 10–0)
- (3:24) UNC – Chris Culliver 95 yard kickoff return, Lucas Osada kick (Drive: 0 plays, 0 yards, 0:21; UConn 10–7)

Second Quarter

- (14:10) CONN – Alex Honig 4 yard pass from Joe Fagnano, Chris Freeman kick (Drive: 11 plays, 79 yards, 4:14; UConn 17–7)
- (0:54) CONN – Cam Edwards 2 yard run, Chris Freeman kick (Drive: 14 plays, 56 yards, 5:54; UConn 24–7)

Third Quarter

- (7:40) CONN – Chris Freeman 24 yard field goal (Drive: 11 plays, 40 yards, 4:56; UConn 27–7)

Fourth Quarter

- (6:46) UNC – John Copenhaver 17 yard from Caleb Hood, Noah Burnette kick (Drive: 8 plays, 96 yards, 4:09; UConn 27–14)

=== Statistics ===
Statistics	CONN	UNC
First downs	20	10
Plays–yards	70–361	42–206
Rushes–yards	46–210	28–96
Passing yards	151	110
Passing: comp–att–int	16–24–0	11–14–1
Time of possession	34:50	25:10

Team	Category	Player	Statistics
UConn	Passing	Joe Fagnano	16/23, 151 yards, 2 TD
UConn	Rushing	Mel Brown	11 carries, 96 yards
UConn	Receiving	Skyler Bell	3 receptions, 77 yards, TD
North Carolina	Passing	Michael Merdinger	9/12, 86 yards, INT
North Carolina	Rushing	Caleb Hood	11 carries, 78 yards
North Carolina	Receiving	John Copenhaver	4 receptions, 44 yards, TD
