= 2024 UConn Huskies football team =

American college football season

2024 UConn Huskies football

Fenway Bowl champion

Fenway Bowl, W 27–14 vs. North Carolina
- Conference: Independent
- Record: 9–4
- Head coach: Jim L. Mora (3rd season)
- Offensive coordinator: Gordon Sammis (1st season)
- Offensive scheme: Spread
- Defensive coordinator: Matt Brock (1st season)
- Base defense: 3–3–5
- Home stadium: Pratt & Whitney Stadium at Rentschler Field

2024 NCAA Division I FBS independents football records
	Conf.			Overall
Team	W		L	W		L
No. 2 Notre Dame ^		–		14	–	2
UConn		–		9	–	4
UMass		–		2	–	10
^ – College Football Playoff participant; Rankings from AP Poll

The 2024 UConn Huskies football team represented the University of Connecticut (UConn) an independent during the 2024 NCAA Division I FBS football season. Led by third-year head coach Jim L. Mora, the Huskies compiled a record of 9–4. UConn was invited to the Fenway Bowl, where the Huskies defeated North Carolina. This marked the program's first bowl game win since 2009. The team played home games at Pratt & Whitney Stadium at Rentschler Field in East Hartford, Connecticut.

After a win over UAB on November 9, in which the Huskies erased a 17-point deficit after the half, UConn secured its first winning season since the 2010 season.

== Schedule ==
Date	Time	Opponent	Site	TV	Result	Attendance
August 31	12:00 p.m.	at Maryland	SECU Stadium; College Park, MD	FS1	L 7–50	35,421
September 7	12:00 p.m.	Merrimack	Pratt & Whitney Stadium at Rentschler Field; East Hartford, CT	WFSB	W 63–17	32,351
September 14	6:00 p.m.	at Duke	Wallace Wade Stadium; Durham, NC	ACCNX, ESPN+	L 21–26	20,174
September 21	7:00 p.m.	Florida Atlantic	Pratt & Whitney Stadium at Rentschler Field; East Hartford, CT	CBSSN	W 48–14	20,144
September 28	12:00 p.m.	Buffalo	Pratt & Whitney Stadium at Rentschler Field; East Hartford, CT	CBSSN	W 47–3	20,347
October 5	3:30 p.m.	Temple	Pratt & Whitney Stadium at Rentschler Field; East Hartford, CT	CBSSN	W 29–20	28,921
October 19	12:00 p.m.	Wake Forest	Pratt & Whitney Stadium at Rentschler Field; East Hartford, CT	CBSSN	L 20–23	30,122
October 26	3:30 p.m.	Rice^{†}	Pratt & Whitney Stadium at Rentschler Field; East Hartford, CT	CBSSN	W 17–10	23,711
November 1	7:00 p.m.	Georgia State	Pratt & Whitney Stadium at Rentschler Field; East Hartford, CT	CBSSN	W 34–27	22,028
November 9	2:30 p.m.	at UAB	Protective Stadium; Birmingham, AL	ESPN+	W 31–23	18,351
November 23	12:00 p.m.	at Syracuse	JMA Wireless Dome; Syracuse, NY (rivalry)	ACCN	L 24–31	35,453
November 30	12:00 p.m.	at UMass	Warren McGuirk Alumni Stadium; Hadley, MA (rivalry)	ESPN+	W 47–42	10,365
December 28	11:00 a.m.	vs. North Carolina	Fenway Park; Boston, MA (Fenway Bowl)	ESPN	W 27–14	27,900
^{†}Homecoming; All times are in Eastern time

== Game summaries ==
=== at Maryland ===
UConn Huskies at Maryland Terrapins – Game summary

Quarter	1	2	3	4	Total
Huskies	0	0	7	0	7
Terrapins	14	9	13	14	50

at SECU Stadium, College Park, Maryland

- Date: August 31
- Game time: 12:03 p.m. EDT
- Game weather: Sunny, 79 °F (26 °C)
- Game attendance: 35,421
- Referee: Art Brown
- TV announcers (FS1): Connor Onion (play-by-play) and Mark Helfrich (color analyst)
- Box Score

Game information
First quarter
- MD - Felton, Tai 18 yd pass from Edwards Jr., Billy (Howes, Jack kick), 11:32. Terrapins 7–0. Drive: 8 plays, 75 yards, TOP 03:28
- MD - Ray, Nolan 48 yd run (Howes, Jack kick), 6:51. Terrapins 14–0. Drive: 7 plays, 92 yards, TOP 03:14

Second quarter

- MD - Howes, Jack 29 yd field goal, 6:29. Terrapins 17–0. Drive: 7 plays, 28 yards, TOP 02:39
- MD - Howes, Jack 33 yd field goal, 0:43. Terrapins 20–0. Drive: 12 plays, 61 yards, TOP 03:47
- MD - Howes, Jack 23 yd field goal, 0:03. Terrapins 23–0. Drive: 6 plays, 40 yards, TOP 00:33

Third quarter

- MD - Hemby, Roman 4 yd run (Howes, Jack kick), 11:11. Terrapins 30–0. Drive: 7 plays, 78 yards, TOP 02:47
- CONN - Sheffield, TJ 27 yd pass from Fagnano, Joe (Freeman, Chris kick), 0:16. Terrapins 30–7. Drive: 6 plays, 82 yards, TOP 02:23
- MD - Felton, Tai 75 yd pass from Edwards Jr., Billy (Kick no good), 0:02. Terrapins 36–7. Drive: 1 plays, 75 yards, TOP 00:14

Fourth quarter

- MD - McLaurin, Josiah 24 yd pass from Edge, Cameron (Marshall, Gavin kick), 9:26. Terrapins 43–7. Drive: 9 plays, 80 yards, TOP 04:17
- MD - Williams, DeJuan 9 yd run (Howes, Jack kick), 1:17. Terrapins 50–7. Drive: 5 plays, 19 yards, TOP 01:27

Statistics	CONN	MD
First downs	11	29
Total yards	310	629
Rushing yards	88	248
Passing yards	222	381
Turnovers	3	0
Time of possession	25:39	34:21

Team	Category	Player	Statistics
UConn	Passing	Joe Fagnano	8/16, 149 yards, TD, INT
UConn	Rushing	Durell Robinson	7 rushes, 34 yards
UConn	Receiving	Skyler Bell	5 receptions, 141 yards
UConn	Defense	Amir Renwick	8 tackles
Maryland	Passing	Billy Edwards Jr.	20/27, 311 yards, 2 TD
Maryland	Rushing	Roman Hemby	14 rushes, 66 yards, TD
Maryland	Receiving	Tai Felton	7 receptions, 178 yards, 2 TD
Maryland	Defense	Glendon Miller	6 tackles, 1 INT

=== Merrimack (FCS) ===
Merrimack Warriors (FCS) at UConn Huskies – Game summary

Quarter	1	2	3	4	Total
Warriors (FCS)	7	0	0	10	17
Huskies	35	21	7	0	63

at Pratt & Whitney Stadium at Rentschler Field, East Hartford, Connecticut

- Date: September 7
- Game time: 12:03 p.m. EDT
- Game weather: Cloudy, 73 °F (23 °C), Wind S 9MPH
- Game attendance: 32,351
- Referee: Brad Carrell
- TV announcers (WFSB): Randy Brochu (play-by-play), Marc Robbins (color analyst) & Joe Zone (sideline)
- Box score

Game information
First quarter
- CONN - Fagnano, Joe 1 yd run (Freeman, Chris kick), 13:00. Huskies 7–0. Drive: 5 plays, 75 yards, TOP 02:00
- CONN - Edwards, Cam 50 yd pass from Fagnano, Joe (Freeman, Chris kick), 9:41. Huskies 14–0. Drive: 4 plays, 64 yards, TOP 01:32
- CONN - Robinson, Durell 48 yd run (Freeman, Chris kick), 7:49. Huskies 21–0. Drive: 1 plays, 48 yards, TOP 00:09
- CONN - Rosa, Victor 29 yd run (Freeman, Chris kick), 4:40. Huskies 28–0. Drive: 4 plays, 54 yards, TOP 01:48
- MC - Corbett, Jermaine 46 yd run (Davis, Lliam kick), 1:39. Huskies 28–7. Drive: 6 plays, 82 yards, TOP 03:01
- CONN - Bell, Skyler 60 yd pass from Fagnano, Joe (Freeman, Chris kick), 0:27. Huskies 35–7. Drive: 2 plays, 62 yards, TOP 00:45

Second quarter

- CONN - Porter, Shamar 39 yd pass from Fagnano, Joe (Freeman, Chris kick), 13:18. Huskies 42–7. Drive: 3 plays, 50 yards, TOP 01:04
- CONN - Edwards, Cam 1 yd run (Freeman, Chris kick), 5:58. Huskies 49–7. Drive: 10 plays, 78 yards, TOP 04:39
- CONN - Anderson, Ezeriah 44 yd pass from Fagnano, Joe (Freeman, Chris kick), 3:24. Huskies 56–7. Drive: 2 plays, 44 yards, TOP 00:31

Third quarter

- CONN - Honig, Alex 12 yd pass from Fagnano, Joe (Freeman, Chris kick), 6:10. Huskies 63–7. Drive: 8 plays, 81 yards, TOP 03:16

Fourth quarter

- MC - Sweitzer, Seth 71 yd pass from Lewis, Justin (Davis, Lliam kick), 7:31. Huskies 63–14. Drive: 1 plays, 71 yards, TOP 00:15
- MC - Davis, Lliam 32 yd field goal, 0:00. Huskies 63–17. Drive: 12 plays, 49 yards, TOP 05:37

Statistics	MRMK	CONN
First downs	13	26
Total yards	279	624
Rushing yards	124	278
Passing yards	155	346
Turnovers	0	0
Time of possession	31:52	28:08

Team	Category	Player	Statistics
Merrimack	Passing	Justin Lewis	6/6, 103 yards, TD
Merrimack	Rushing	Jermaine Corbett	14 rushes, 103 yards, TD
Merrimack	Receiving	Seth Sweitzer	2 receptions, 77 yards, TD
Merrimack	Defense	Danny Simms	6 tackles
UConn	Passing	Joe Fagnano	13/19, 328 yards, 5 TD
UConn	Rushing	Durell Robinson	10 rushes, 94 yards, TD
UConn	Receiving	Skyler Bell	2 receptions, 105 yards, TD
UConn	Defense	Jayden McDonald	8 tackles

=== at Duke ===
UConn Huskies at Duke Blue Devils – Game summary

Quarter	1	2	3	4	Total
Huskies	0	7	14	0	21
Blue Devils	7	10	0	9	26

at Wallace Wade Stadium • Durham, North Carolina

- Date: September 14
- Game time: 6:02 p.m. EDT
- Game weather: Temperature: 78 °F (26 °C) • Weather: Sunny
- Game attendance: 20,174
- Referee: Stuart Mullins
- TV announcers (ACCNX/ESPN+): Clay Matvick (play-by-play), Steve Addazio (color analyst) & Marilyn Payne (sideline)
- Box Score

Game information
First quarter
- DUKE - Moore, Jordan 4 yd pass from Murphy, Maalik (Pelino, Todd kick), 9:34. Blue Devils 7–0. Drive: 9 plays, 92 yards, TOP 03:32

Second quarter

- DUKE - Pelino, Todd 53 yd field goal, 12:10. Blue Devils 10–0. Drive: 4 plays, 4 yards, TOP 00:40
- DUKE - Pancol, Eli 36 yd pass from Murphy, Maalik (Pelino, Todd kick), 8:27. Blue Devils 17–0. Drive: 6 plays, 70 yards, TOP 02:49
- CONN - Hardy, Langston 64 yd interception (Freeman, Chris kick), 3:47. Blue Devils 17–7. Drive: 1 play, 64 yards

Third quarter

- CONN - Edwards, Cam 1 yd run (Freeman, Chris kick), 11:46. Blue Devils 17–14. Drive: 8 plays, 64 yards, TOP 02:21
- CONN - Honig, Alex 13 yd pass from Evers, Nick (Freeman, Chris kick), 8:21. Huskies 21–17. Drive: 5 plays, 75 yards, TOP 02:17

Fourth quarter

- DUKE - Pelino, Todd 47 yd field goal, 14:56. Huskies 21–20. Drive: 10 plays, 13 yards, TOP 03:43
- DUKE - Brown, Que'Sean 20 yd pass from Murphy, Maalik (2PC No Good), 11:49. Blue Devils 26–21. Drive: 7 plays, 56 yards, TOP 02:17

Statistics	CONN	DUKE
First downs	17	22
Total yards	314	409
Rushing yards	179	142
Passing yards	135	267
Turnovers	2	1
Time of possession	27:01	32:59

Team	Category	Player	Statistics
UConn	Passing	Nick Evers	15/29, 135 yards, TD
UConn	Rushing	Cam Edwards	21 rushes, 106 yards, TD
UConn	Receiving	Skyler Bell	7 receptions, 58 yards
UConn	Defense	Tui Faumuina-Brown	12 tackles
Duke	Passing	Maalik Murphy	28/43, 267 yards, 3 TD
Duke	Rushing	Star Thomas	22 rushes, 122 yards
Duke	Receiving	Que'Sean Brown	11 rec, 87 yards, TD
Duke	Defense	Cameron Bergeron	7 tackles

=== Florida Atlantic ===
Florida Atlantic at UConn Huskies – Game summary

Quarter	1	2	3	4	Total
Owls	0	0	7	7	14
Huskies	3	14	10	21	48

at Rentschler Field • East Hartford, Connecticut

- Date: September 21
- Game time: 7:07 p.m. EDT
- Game weather: Temperature: 63 °F (17 °C) • Wind: NE at 7 miles per hour (11 km/h) • Weather: Cloudy
- Game attendance: 20,144
- Referee: Rory Bernard
- TV announcers (CBSSN): Jordan Kent (play-by-play), Logan Ryan (color analyst) & Keiana Martin (sideline)
- Box Score

Game information
First quarter
- CONN - Freeman, Chris 34 yd field goal, 10:09. Huskies 3–0. Drive: 10 plays, 57 yards, TOP 03:52

Second quarter

- CONN - Brown, Mel 5 yd pass from Evers, Nick (Freeman, Chris kick), 11:32. Huskies 10–0. Drive: 12 plays, 80 yards, TOP 06:46
- CONN - Robinson, Durell 8 yd run (Freeman, Chris kick), 1:50. Huskies 17–0. Drive: 12 plays, 91 yards, TOP 05:56

Third quarter

- CONN - Evers, Nick 3 yd run (Freeman, Chris kick), 8:09. Huskies 24–0. Drive: 14 plays, 75 yards, TOP 06:51
- CONN - Freeman, Chris 35 yd field goal, 5:47. Huskies 27–0. Drive: 4 plays, 6 yards, TOP 01:59
- FAU - Campbell Jr., CJ 3 yd run (Davis, Carter kick), 2:17. Huskies 27–7. Drive: 8 plays, 72 yards, TOP 03:24

Fourth quarter

- CONN - Evers, Nick 2 yd run (Freeman, Chris kick), 14:26. Huskies 34–7. Drive: 6 plays, 75 yards, TOP 02:51
- CONN - Robinson, Durell 10 yd run (Freeman, Chris kick), 11:45. Huskies 41–7. Drive: 3 plays, 31 yards, TOP 01:12
- FAU - Campbell Jr., CJ 38 yd run (Davis, Carter kick), 9:57. Huskies 41–14. Drive: 5 plays, 75 yards, TOP 01:48
- CONN - Porter, Shamar 33 yd pass from Fagnano, Joe (Freeman, Chris kick), 5:02. Huskies 48–14. Drive: 7 plays, 57 yards, TOP 04:54

Statistics

Statistics	FAU	CONN
First downs	9	32
Total yards	250	542
Rushing yards	163	421
Passing yards	87	121
Turnovers	1	1
Time of possession	18:03	41:57

Team	Category	Player	Statistics
Florida Atlantic	Passing	Cam Fancher	9/15, 87 yds, 1 INT
Florida Atlantic	Rushing	Cam Fancher	8 att, 71 yds
Florida Atlantic	Receiving	Caleb Coombs	2 rec, 28 yds
Florida Atlantic	Defense	CJ Heard	12 tackles
UConn	Passing	Nick Evers	9/14, 88 yds, 1 TD
UConn	Rushing	Mel Brown	21 att, 156 yds
UConn	Receiving	Skyler Bell	1 rec, 43 yds
UConn	Defense	Tui Faumuina-Brown	9 tackles

=== Buffalo ===
Buffalo Bulls at UConn Huskies – Game summary

Quarter	1	2	3	4	Total
Bulls	0	3	0	0	3
Huskies	10	13	14	10	47

at Rentschler Field • East Hartford, Connecticut

- Date: September 28
- Game time: 12:03 p.m. EDT
- Game weather: Temperature: 73 °F (23 °C) • Wind: E at 8 miles per hour (13 km/h) • Weather: Cloudy
- Game attendance: 20,347
- Referee: Riley Johnson
- TV announcers (CBSSN): Jordan Kent (play-by-play), Logan Ryan (color analyst) & Keiana Martin (sideline)

Game information
First quarter
- CONN - Freeman, Chris 26 yd field goal, 8:49. Huskies 3–0. Drive: 12 plays, 58 yards, TOP 05:11
- CONN - Edwards, Cam 43 yd run (Freeman, Chris kick), 4:32. Huskies 10–0. Drive: 4 plays, 57 yards, TOP 02:01

Second quarter

- CONN - Freeman, Chris 39 yd field goal, 11:09. Huskies 13–0. Drive: 11 plays, 46 yards, TOP 03:59
- CONN - Freeman, Chris 22 yd field goal, 5:18. Huskies 16–0. Drive: 4 plays, 18 yards, TOP 01:12
- CONN - Bell, Skyler 40 yd pass from Fagnano, Joe (Freeman, Chris kick), 1:13. Huskies 23–0. Drive: 7 plays, 64 yards, TOP 01:17
- BUF - Bellenfant, Upton 47 yd field goal, 0:00. Huskies 23–3. Drive: 7 plays, 46 yards, TOP 01:13

Third quarter

- CONN - Bell, Skyler 70 yd pass from Fagnano, Joe (Freeman, Chris kick), 14:12. Huskies 30–3. Drive: 3 plays, 75 yards, TOP 00:48
- CONN - Bell, Skyler 12 yd pass from Fagnano, Joe (Freeman, Chris kick), 5:33. Huskies 37–3. Drive: 6 plays, 57 yards, TOP 02:38

Fourth quarter

- CONN - Brown, Mel 23 yd run (Freeman, Chris kick), 14:56. Huskies 44–3. Drive: 4 plays, 83 yards, TOP 02:06
- CONN - Freeman, Chris 27 yd field goal, 12:00. Huskies 47–3. Drive: 6 plays, 41 yards, TOP 01:50

Statistics

Statistics	BUF	CONN
First downs	12	28
Total yards	198	537
Rushing yards	75	257
Passing yards	123	280
Turnovers	1	0
Time of possession	25:40	34:20

Team	Category	Player	Statistics
Buffalo	Passing	CJ Ogbonna	12/25, 82 yds
Buffalo	Rushing	CJ Ogbonna	14 att, 38 yds
Buffalo	Receiving	JJ Jenkins	5 rec, 32 yds
Buffalo	Defense	Red Murdock	14 tackles, 1 sack
UConn	Passing	Joe Fagnano	11/19, 217 yds, 3 TDs
UConn	Rushing	Cam Edwards	10 att, 97 yds, 1 TD
UConn	Receiving	Skyler Bell	6 rec, 153 yds, 3 TDs
UConn	Defense	Jayden McDonald	6 tackles

=== Temple ===
Temple Owls at UConn Huskies – Game summary

Quarter	1	2	3	4	Total
Owls	0	7	6	7	20
Huskies	3	6	7	13	29

at Rentschler Field • East Hartford, Connecticut

- Date: October 5
- Game time: 3:32 p.m. EDT
- Game weather: Temperature: 74 °F (23 °C) • Wind: N at 11 miles per hour (18 km/h) • Weather: Sunny
- Game attendance: 28,921
- Referee: Marcus Woods
- TV announcers (CBSSN): Jordan Kent (play-by-play), Adam Breneman (color analyst) & Keiana Martin (sideline)
- Box Score

Game information
First quarter
- CONN - Freeman, Chris 43 yd field goal, 6:25. Huskies 3–0. Drive: 4 plays, -2 yards, TOP 01:17

Second quarter

- TEM - Adams, John 0 yd punt return (Trujillo, Maddux kick), 10:32. Owls 7–3. Drive: 1 play, 0 yards
- CONN - Freeman, Chris 24 yd field goal, 1:45. Owls 7–6. Drive: 13 plays, 53 yards, TOP 04:06
- CONN - Freeman, Chris 35 yd field goal, 0:08. Huskies 9–7. Drive: 13 plays, 51 yards, TOP 01:13

Third quarter

- TEM - Trujillo, Maddux 60 yd field goal, 11:08. Owls 10–9. Drive: 10 plays, 39 yards, TOP 03:48
- TEM - Trujillo, Maddux 42 yd field goal, 2:43. Owls 13–9. Drive: 4 plays, -10 yards, TOP 01:58
- CONN - Sheffield, TJ 58 yd pass from Fagnano, Joe (Freeman, Chris kick), 2:11. Huskies 16–13. Drive: 2 plays, 75 yards, TOP 00:32

Fourth quarter

- TEM - Brock, Forrest 8 yd run (Trujillo, Maddux kick), 9:52. Owls 20–16. Drive: 5 plays, 44 yards, TOP 02:04
- CONN - Robinson, Durell 1 yd run (Freeman, Chris kick), 3:46. Huskies 23–20. Drive: 10 plays, 70 yards, TOP 03:31
- CONN - Wright, Jordan 96 yd fumble recovery (No kick attempt), 0:00. Huskies 29–0. Drive: 1 play, 96 yards

Statistics

Statistics	TEM	CONN
First downs	15	21
Total yards	270	371
Rushing yards	134	99
Passing yards	136	272
Turnovers	3	3
Time of possession	29:10	30:50

Team	Category	Player	Statistics
Temple	Passing	Forrest Brock	19/32, 136 yds
Temple	Rushing	Terrez Worthy	12 att, 95 yds
Temple	Receiving	Dante Wright	8 rec, 67 yds
Temple	Defense	Tyquan King	15 tackles, 1 FF
UConn	Passing	Joe Fagnano	24/41, 272 yds, 1 TD
UConn	Rushing	Durell Robinson	12 att, 52 yds, 1 TD
UConn	Receiving	TJ Sheffield	9 rec, 141 yds, 1 TD
UConn	Defense	Jayden McDonald	14 tackles, 1 sack

=== Wake Forest ===
Wake Forest Demon Deacons at UConn Huskies – Game summary

Quarter	1	2	3	4	Total
Demon Deacons	3	10	7	3	23
Huskies	3	3	7	7	20

at Rentschler Field • East Hartford, Connecticut

- Date: October 19
- Game time: 12:02 p.m. EDT
- Game weather: Temperature: 48 °F (9 °C) • Wind: S at 2 miles per hour (3.2 km/h) • Weather: Sunny
- Game attendance: 30,122
- Referee: Riley Johnson
- TV announcers (CBSSN): Rich Waltz (play-by-play), Ross Tucker (color analyst) & Tiffany Blackmon (sideline)
- Box Score

Game information
First quarter
- WF - Dennis, Matthew 32 yd field goal, 3:55. Demon Deacons 3–0. Drive: 7 plays, 34 yards, TOP 03:50
- CONN - Freeman, Chris 35 yd field goal, 1:22. Tied 3–3. Drive: 11 plays, 58 yards, TOP 02:33

Second quarter

- WF - Claiborne, Demond 5 yd run (Carlson, Caleb kick), 13:21. Demon Deacons 10–3. Drive: 7 plays, 75 yards, TOP 02:45
- WF - Dennis, Matthew 31 yd field goal, 6:01. Demon Deacons 13–3. Drive: 13 plays, 70 yards, TOP 04:31
- CONN - Freeman, Chris 53 yd field goal, 1:50. Demon Deacons 13–6. Drive: 10 plays, 40 yards, TOP 04:11

Third quarter

- WF - Claiborne, Demond 1 yd run (Carlson, Caleb kick), 10:45. Demon Deacons 20–6. Drive: 8 plays, 75 yards, TOP 04:15
- CONN - Gathings, Jasaiah 20 yd pass from Evers, Nick (Freeman, Chris kick), 7:33. Demon Deacons 20–13. Drive: 7 plays, 50 yards, TOP 03:04

Fourth quarter

- WF - Dennis, Matthew 36 yd field goal, 11:13. Demon Deacons 23–13. Drive: 9 plays, 38 yards, TOP 05:02
- CONN - Hansen, Louis 25 yd pass from Evers, Nick (Freeman, Chris kick), 2:27. Demon Deacons 23–20. Drive: 13 plays, 88 yards, TOP 03:56

Statistics

Statistics	WAKE	CONN
First downs	24	18
Total yards	391	304
Rushing yards	117	40
Passing yards	274	264
Turnovers	1	1
Time of possession	34:31	25:29

Team	Category	Player	Statistics
Wake Forest	Passing	Hank Bachmeier	21/36, 274 yds
Wake Forest	Rushing	Demond Claiborne	24 att, 60 yds, 2 TDs
Wake Forest	Receiving	Taylor Morin	6 rec, 104 yds
Wake Forest	Defense	Branson Combs	8 tackles
UConn	Passing	Nick Evers	26/43, 264 yds, 2 TDs
UConn	Rushing	Cam Edwards	7 att, 26 yds
UConn	Receiving	Jasaiah Gathings	7 rec, 75 yds, 1 TDs
UConn	Defense	Jayden McDonald	13 tackles, 1 sack

=== Rice ===
Rice Owls at UConn Huskies – Game summary

Quarter	1	2	3	4	Total
Owls	3	0	0	7	10
Huskies	0	0	7	10	17

at Rentschler Field • East Hartford, Connecticut

- Date: October 26
- Game time: 3:30 p.m. EDT
- Game weather: Temperature: 65 °F (18 °C) • Wind: SE at 13 miles per hour (21 km/h) • Weather: Sunny
- Game attendance: 23,711
- Referee: Gary Patterson
- TV announcers (CBSSN): Jordan Kent (play-by-play), Logan Ryan (color analyst) & Keiana Martin (sideline)
- Box Score

Game information
First quarter
- RICE - Horn, Tim 23 yd field goal, 2:35. Owls 3–0. Drive: 5 plays, 20 yards, TOP 02:13

Second quarter

- None

Third quarter

- CONN - Robinson, Durell 68 yd run (Freeman, Chris kick), 7:02. Huskies 7–3. Drive: 1 plays, 68 yards, TOP 00:10

Fourth quarter

- CONN - Edwards, Cam 4 yd run (Freeman, Chris kick), 10:15. Huskies 14–3. Drive: 7 plays, 72 yards, TOP 03:52
- CONN - Freeman, Chris 30 yd field goal, 3:40. Huskies 17–3. Drive: 9 plays, 31 yards, TOP 04:54
- RICE - Jackson, Quinton 100 yd kickoff return (Horn, Tim kick), 3:28. Huskies 17–10. Drive: 1 play, 100 yards

Statistics

Statistics	RICE	CONN
First downs	10	18
Total yards	178	309
Rushing yards	90	181
Passing yards	88	128
Turnovers	1	2
Time of possession	28:26	31:34

Team	Category	Player	Statistics
Rice	Passing	Drew Devillier	14/30, 88 yds
Rice	Rushing	Dean Connors	20 att, 46 yds
Rice	Receiving	Matt Sykes	3 rec, 24 yds
Rice	Defense	Tyson Flowers	8 tackles
UConn	Passing	Nick Evers	9/24, 128 yds
UConn	Rushing	Durell Robinson	15 att, 132 yds, 1 TD
UConn	Receiving	Skyler Bell	3 rec, 47 yds
UConn	Defense	Tui Faumuina-Brown	10 tackles, 1 FF

=== Georgia State ===
Georgia State Panthers at UConn Huskies – Game summary

Quarter	1	2	3	4	Total
Panthers	0	10	3	14	27
Huskies	10	3	7	14	34

at Rentschler Field • East Hartford, Connecticut

- Date: November 1
- Game time: 7:02 p.m. EDT
- Game weather: Temperature: 66 °F (19 °C) • Wind: NW at 9 miles per hour (14 km/h) • Weather: Clear
- Game attendance: 22,028
- Referee: Nate Black
- TV announcers (CBSSN): Jordan Kent (play-by-play), Logan Ryan (analyst) & Keiana Martin (sideline)
- Box Score

Game information
First quarter
- CONN - Hansen, Louis 2 yd pass from Evers, Nick (Freeman, Chris kick), 12:31. Huskies 7–0. Drive: 3 plays, 59 yards, TOP 01:02
- CONN - Freeman, Chris 42 yd field goal, 3:36. Huskies 10–0. Drive: 12 plays, 59 yards, TOP 04:53

Second quarter

- GAST - Hurst, Ted 7 yd pass from Gibson, Zach (Rickman, Liam kick), 13:36. Huskies 10–7. Drive: 10 plays, 75 yards, TOP 04:55
- GAST - Rickman, Liam 30 yd field goal, 3:29. Tied 10–10. Drive: 11 plays, 33 yards, TOP 05:37
- CONN - Freeman, Chris 28 yd field goal, 0:20. Huskies 13–10. Drive: 5 plays, 16 yards, TOP 00:40

Third quarter

- CONN - Robinson, Durell 1 yd run (Freeman, Chris kick), 12:01. Huskies 20–10. Drive: 6 plays, 75 yards, TOP 02:59
- GAST - Rickman, Liam 20 yd field goal, 4:36. Huskies 20–13. Drive: 16 plays, 72 yards, TOP 07:25

Fourth quarter

- CONN - Evers, Nick 5 yd run (Freeman, Chris kick), 12:54. Huskies 27–13. Drive: 8 plays, 57 yards, TOP 04:01
- CONN - Brown, Mel 31 yd run (Freeman, Chris kick), 11:26. Huskies 34–13. Drive: 1 plays, 31 yards, TOP 00:05
- GAST - Brock, Freddie 55 yd run (Rickman, Liam kick), 9:31. Huskies 34–20. Drive: 4 plays, 64 yards, TOP 01:45
- GAST - Gibson, Zach 2 yd run (Rickman, Liam kick), 1:47. Huskies 34–27. Drive: 12 plays, 93 yards, TOP 02:56

Statistics

Statistics	GAST	CONN
First downs	21	19
Total yards	374	346
Rushing yards	109	271
Passing yards	265	75
Turnovers	2	1
Time of possession	32:36	27:24

Team	Category	Player	Statistics
Georgia State	Passing	Zach Gibson	28/40, 257 yds, 1 TD
Georgia State	Rushing	Freddie Brock	10 att, 78 yds, 1 TD
Georgia State	Receiving	Ted Hurst	7 rec, 91 yds, 1 TD
Georgia State	Defense	Josiah Robinson	12 tackles
UConn	Passing	Nick Evers	10/16, 75 yds, 1 TD
UConn	Rushing	Mel Brown	14 att, 138 yds, 1 TD
UConn	Receiving	Louis Hansen	5 rec, 22 yds, 1 TD
UConn	Defense	Tui Faumuina-Brown	12 tackles

=== at UAB ===
UConn Huskies at UAB Blazers – Game summary

Quarter	1	2	3	4	Total
Huskies	3	0	7	21	31
Blazers	3	17	3	0	23

at Protective Stadium • Birmingham, Alabama

- Date: November 9
- Game time: 2:32 p.m. EST
- Game weather: Temperature: 76 °F (24 °C) • Wind: SE at 8 miles per hour (13 km/h) • Weather: Rainy
- Game attendance: 18,351
- Referee: Tim Hedgepeth
- TV announcers (ESPN+): James Westling (play-by-play), Leger Douzable (analyst) & Maria Trivelpiece (sideline)
- Box Score

Game information
First quarter
- UAB - Delange, Jonah 20 yd field goal, 9:25. Blazers 3–0. Drive: 14 plays, 73 yards, TOP 05:35
- CONN - Freeman, Chris 26 yd field goal, 3:19. Tied 3–3. Drive: 13 plays, 57 yards, TOP 06:06

Second quarter

- UAB - Delange, Jonah 36 yd field goal, 13:07. Blazers 6–3. Drive: 7 plays, 43 yards, TOP 01:53
- UAB - Milliner, Corri 38 yd pass from Kitna, Jalen (Delange, Jonah kick), 7:02. Blazers 13–3. Drive: 8 plays, 76 yards, TOP 04:12
- UAB - Beebe Jr., Lee 25 yd run (Delange, Jonah kick), 0:20. Blazers 20–3. Drive: 5 plays, 42 yards, TOP 01:37

Third quarter

- CONN - Robinson, Durell 1 yd run (Freeman, Chris kick), 7:57. Blazers 20–10. Drive: 15 plays, 75 yards, TOP 07:03
- UAB - Delange, Jonah 32 yd field goal, 3:49. Blazers 23–10. Drive: 9 plays, 61 yards, TOP 04:08

Fourth quarter

- CONN - Porter, Shamar 6 yd pass from Fagnano, Joe (Freeman, Chris kick), 8:45. Blazers 23–17. Drive: 8 plays, 58 yards, TOP 01:14
- CONN - Gathings, Jasaiah 21 yd pass from Fagnano, Joe (Freeman, Chris kick), 8:28. Huskies 24–23. Drive: 2 plays, 21 yards, TOP 00:14
- CONN - Edwards, Cam 48 yd run (Freeman, Chris kick), 2:39. Huskies 31–23. Drive: 4 plays, 59 yards, TOP 02:15

Statistics

Statistics	CONN	UAB
First downs	20	23
Total yards	365	403
Rushing yards	189	170
Passing yards	176	233
Turnovers	2	4
Time of possession	30:27	29:33

Team	Category	Player	Statistics
UConn	Passing	Nick Evers	15/24, 104 yds
UConn	Rushing	Cam Edwards	11 att, 82 yds, 1 TD
UConn	Receiving	Jasaiah Gathings	6 rec, 52 yds, 1 TD
UConn	Defense	Jayden McDonald	12 tackles
UAB	Passing	Jalen Kitna	22/42, 233 yds, 1 TD
UAB	Rushing	Lee Beebe Jr.	17 att, 115 yds, 1 TD
UAB	Receiving	Amare Thomas	6 rec, 88 yds
UAB	Defense	Everett Roussaw Jr	9 tackles

=== at Syracuse (rivalry) ===
UConn Huskies at Syracuse Orange – Game summary

Quarter	1	2	3	4	Total
Huskies	7	7	3	7	24
Orange	7	14	3	7	31

at JMA Wireless Dome • Syracuse, New York

- Date: November 23
- Game time: 12:03 p.m. EST
- Game weather: Indoor
- Game attendance: 35,453
- Referee: Riley Johnson
- TV announcers (ACCN): Chris Cotter (play-by-play), Mark Herzlich (analyst) & Coley Harvey (sideline)
- Box Score

Game information
First quarter
- SYR - Gadsden II, Oronde 22 yd pass from McCord, Kyle (Kennedy, Jackson kick), 14:10. Orange 7–0. Drive: 2 plays, 75 yards, TOP 00:50
- CONN - Edwards, Cam 71 yd run (Freeman, Chris kick), 5:41. Tied 7–7. Drive: 4 plays, 80 yards, TOP 01:37

Second quarter

- SYR - McCord, Kyle 5 yd pass from McCord, Kyle (Kennedy, Jackson kick), 14:55. Orange 14–7. Drive: 12 plays, 77 yards, TOP 05:40
- SYR - Allen, LeQuint 1 yd run (Kennedy, Jackson kick), 3:17. Orange 21–7. Drive: 14 plays, 68 yards, TOP 06:15
- CONN - Hansen, Louis 5 yd pass from Fagnano, Joe (Freeman, Chris kick), 0:32. Orange 21–14. Drive: 10 plays, 75 yards, TOP 02:45

Third quarter

- SYR - Kennedy, Jackson 23 yd field goal, 4:35. Orange 24–14. Drive: 9 plays, 69 yards, TOP 04:00
- CONN - Freeman, Chris 42 yd field goal, 0:35. Orange 24–17. Drive: 6 plays, 10 yards, TOP 02:39

Fourth quarter

- SYR - McCord, Kyle 1 yd run (Kennedy, Jackson kick), 10:09. Orange 31–17. Drive: 10 plays, 73 yards, TOP 04:51
- CONN - Sheffield, TJ 2 yd pass from Fagnano, Joe (Freeman, Chris kick), 1:29. Orange 31–24. Drive: 15 plays, 89 yards, TOP 02:54

Statistics

Statistics	CONN	SYR
First downs	16	25
Total yards	352	538
Rushing yards	124	68
Passing yards	228	470
Turnovers	0	0
Time of possession	22:34	37:26

Team	Category	Player	Statistics
UConn	Passing	Joe Fagnano	27/48, 228 yds, 2 TDs
UConn	Rushing	Cam Edwards	8 att, 87 yds, 1 TD
UConn	Receiving	Skyler Bell	10 rec, 113 yds
UConn	Defense	Jayden McDonald	12 tackles, 1 sack
Syracuse	Passing	Kyle McCord	37/47, 470 yds, 2 TDs
Syracuse	Rushing	LeQuint Allen	20 att, 58 yds, 1 TD
Syracuse	Receiving	Darrell Gill Jr.	9 rec, 185 yds
Syracuse	Defense	Marlowe Wax	7 tackles

=== at UMass (rivalry) ===
UConn Huskies at UMass Minutemen – Game summary

Quarter	1	2	3	4	Total
Huskies	14	13	6	14	47
Minutemen	14	14	0	14	42

at Warren McGuirk Alumni Stadium, Hadley, Massachusetts

- Date: November 30
- Game time: 12:02 p.m. EST
- Game weather: Temperature: 37 °F (3 °C) • Wind: W at 8 miles per hour (13 km/h) • Weather: Sunny
- Game attendance: 10,365
- Referee: Nate Black
- TV announcers (ESPN+): Jay Burnham (play-by-play) and Andy Gresh (analyst)
- Box Score

Game information
First quarter
- CONN - Hansen, Louis 55 yd pass from Fagnano, Joe (Freeman, Chris kick), 13:57. Huskies 7–0. Drive: 1 plays, 55 yards, TOP 00:10
- MASS - Gibson, Jacquon 19 yd pass from Hairston, AJ (Lurie, Jacob kick), 8:16. Tied 7–7. Drive: 9 plays, 78 yards, TOP 05:34
- MASS - Keeney-James, Jakobie 29 yd pass from Hairston, AJ (Lurie, Jacob kick), 2:17. Minutemen 14–7. Drive: 8 plays, 60 yards, TOP 04:39
- CONN - Brown, Mel 96 yd kickoff return (Freeman, Chris kick), 2:02. Tied 14–14. Drive: 1 play, 96 yards

Second quarter

- CONN - Edwards, Cam 3 yd run (Freeman, Chris kick), 11:58. Huskies 21–14. Drive: 10 plays, 80 yards, TOP 03:14
- MASS - Mazotti, Dominick 1 yd pass from Hairston, AJ (Lurie, Jacob kick), 8:26. Tied 21–21. Drive: 4 plays, 35 yards, TOP 01:55
- CONN - Freeman, Chris 30 yd field goal, 4:46. Huskies 24–21. Drive: 8 plays, 63 yards, TOP 03:34
- MASS - John, Jalen 15 yd run (Moore, Riley kick), 1:19. Minutemen 28–24. Drive: 8 plays, 75 yards, TOP 03:27
- CONN - Freeman, Chris 53 yd field goal, 0:17. Minutemen 28–27. Drive: 7 plays, 17 yards, TOP 00:55

Third quarter

- CONN - Gathings, Jasaiah 26 yd pass from Fagnano, Joe (2PC no good), 0:12. Huskies 33–28. Drive: 4 plays, 49 yards, TOP 01:29

Fourth quarter

- CONN - Edwards, Cam 3 yd pass from Fagnano, Joe (Freeman, Chris kick), 11:12. Huskies 40–28. Drive: 7 plays, 35 yards, TOP 03:35
- MASS - Hester, CJ 8 yd run (Lurie, Jacob kick), 7:20. Huskies 40–35. Drive: 7 plays, 75 yards, TOP 03:52
- CONN - Robinson, Durell 15 yd run (Freeman, Chris kick), 2:18. Huskies 47–35. Drive: 9 plays, 78 yards, TOP 04:57
- MASS - Harding, T.Y. 7 yd pass from Perry, Will (Moore, Riley kick), 0:36. Huskies 47–42. Drive: 13 plays, 75 yards, TOP 01:42

Statistics	CONN	MASS
First downs	22	22
Total yards	434	390
Rushing yards	253	184
Passing yards	181	206
Turnovers	1	0
Time of possession	29:05	30:55

Team	Category	Player	Statistics
UConn	Passing	Joe Fagnano	15/26, 181 yds, 3 TDs
UConn	Rushing	Cam Edwards	18 att, 142 yds, 1 TD
UConn	Receiving	Louis Hansen	4 rec, 73 yds, 1 TD
UConn	Defense	Jayden McDonald	20 tackles
UMass	Passing	AJ Hairston	13/21, 134 yds, 3 TD
UMass	Rushing	Jalen John	18 att, 78 yds, 1 TD
UMass	Receiving	Jakobie Keeney-James	5 rec, 68 yds, 1 TD
UMass	Defense	Tyler Rudolph	12 tackles

=== vs North Carolina (Fenway Bowl) ===
2024 Wasabi Fenway Bowl
UConn Huskies vs North Carolina Tar Heels – Game summary

Quarter	1	2	3	4	Total
Huskies	10	14	3	0	27
Tar Heels	7	0	0	7	14

at Fenway Park • Boston, Massachusetts

- Date: Saturday, December 28, 2024
- Game time: 11:06 a.m. EST
- Game weather: Sunny • Temperature: 38 °F (3 °C) • Wind: NE 3
- Game attendance: 27,900
- Referee: Patrick Foy
- TV announcers (ESPN): Chris Cotter (play-by-play), Mark Herzlich (analyst), and Coley Harvey (sideline)
- Box Score

Game information
First quarter
- CONN - Freeman, Chris 32 yd field goal, 10:36. Huskies 3–0. Drive: 8 plays, 61 yards, TOP 04:14
- CONN - Bell, Skyler 38 yd pass from Fagnano, Joe (Freeman, Chris kick), 3:45. Huskies 10–0. Drive: 2 plays, 51 yards, TOP 00:31
- UNC - Culliver, Chris 95 yd kickoff return (Osada, Lucas kick), 3:24. Huskies 10–7. Drive: 1 play, 95 yards

Second quarter

- CONN - Honig, Alex 4 yd pass from Fagnano, Joe (Freeman, Chris kick), 14:10. Huskies 17–7. Drive: 11 plays, 79 yards, TOP 04:14
- CONN - Edwards, Cam 2 yd run (Freeman, Chris kick), 0:54. Huskies 24–7. Drive: 14 plays, 56 yards, TOP 05:54

Third quarter

- CONN - Freeman, Chris 24 yd field goal, 7:40. Huskies 27–7. Drive: 11 plays, 40 yards, TOP 04:56

Fourth quarter

- UNC - Copenhaver, John 17 yd pass from Hood, Caleb (Burnette, Noah kick), 6:46. Huskies 27–14. Drive: 8 plays, 96 yards, TOP 04:09

Statistics	CONN	UNC
First downs	20	10
Total yards	361	206
Rushing yards	210	96
Passing yards	151	110
Turnovers	0	1
Time of possession	34:50	25:10

Team	Category	Player	Statistics
UConn	Passing	Joe Fagnano	16/23, 151 yds, 2 TDs
UConn	Rushing	Mel Brown	11 att, 96 yds
UConn	Receiving	Skyler Bell	3 rec, 77 yds, 1 TD
UConn	Defense	Malik Dixon-Williams	7 tackles
North Carolina	Passing	Michael Merdinger	9/12, 86 yds
North Carolina	Rushing	Caleb Hood	11 att, 78 yds
North Carolina	Receiving	John Copenhaver	4 rec, 44 yds, 1 TD
North Carolina	Defense	Caleb LaVallee	9 tackles

== Personnel ==
=== Roster ===
2024 UConn Huskies football team roster
Players
Coaches
Offense

Pos.	#	Name	Class
RB	0	Cam Edwards	So
WR	1	Skyler Bell	Jr
QB	2	Joe Fagnano	Sr
QB	3	Nick Evers	So
WR	4	Jasaiah Gathings	Jr
WR	5	Shamar Porter	Fr
WR	6	Ezeriah Anderson	Sr
RB	7	Mel Brown	Jr
WR	8	TJ Sheffield	GS
WR	9	Zackary Drawdy	Fr
WR	10	Brett Buckman	GS
QB	10	Caleb Smith	Fr
RB	11	Durell Robinson	Fr
QB	12	Tucker McDonald	Fr
QB	13	Cole Welliver	Fr
TE	14	Nick Harris	Sr
QB	14	Jake Tripptree	Fr
WR	15	Bryan Domino	Fr
WR	16	Brock Montgomery	Fr
WR	17	Teddy Williams	Fr
WR	18	Kylish Hicks	So
WR	19	Jackson Harper	Fr
WR	20	Terrence Smith	Fr
RB	21	Daniel Shaban	Fr
RB	22	Victor Rosa	Jr
RB	23	Malik Thomas Jr	Sr
RB	24	Frank Daniley	Fr
WR	25	Cole Lakatos	Sr
TE	30	Dominic Toy	Fr
RB	44	Oliver Lundberg Coleman	Fr
RB	46	John Bechtle	Sr
TE	48	James Larson	Fr
TE	49	Bryce Anderson	Fr
OL	50	Tank Green	Jr
OL	52	Deron McLaughlin	Fr
OL	54	Jake Kiernan	Fr
OL	55	Toluwanimi Tunde	Fr
OL	58	Kyle Juergans	Jr
OL	59	Finn Wilkins	Fr
OL	60	Mason Raymer	Sr
OL	61	Diego Rodriguez	Fr
OL	66	Brady Wayburn	Fr
OL	67	Christopher Fortin	Sr
OL	70	Jack Stewart	Sr
OL	71	Valentin Senn	Sr
OL	73	Wes Hoeh	Jr
OL	74	Jayden Bass	Fr
OL	75	Chase Lundt	Sr
OL	76	Toriyan Johnson	Fr
OL	77	Ben Murawski	Fr
OT	78	Carsten Casady	Fr
OL	79	Danny Antolovich	Jr
WR	80	John Neider	Fr
TE	81	Louis Hansen	Jr
WR	82	Jarvis Jones	Fr
TE	86	Alexander Honig	Jr
TE	87	Clemans Richter	Fr
TE	88	Nader Chirchi	Fr

Defense

Pos.	#	Name	Class
DB	0	Jordan Wright	Sr
DB	1	Malik Dixon-Williams	Sr
DB	2	Rante Jones	Sr
DB	3	D'Mon Brinson	Jr
DB	4	Stan Cross	Sr
LB	5	Aaron Key	GS
DB	6	Dean Engram	Sr
DB	7	Malachi Mclean	So
DB	8	Jarvarius Sims	Jr
LB	9	Amir Renwick	Sr
LB	10	Jayden McDonald	Sr
DB	11	Isiah Davis	So
DB	12	Chris Hudson	So
DB	13	Cam Chadwick	Fr
DB	14	Malcolm Bell	Jr
LB	15	Tui Faumuina-Brown	Sr
LB	18	Ethan Hogg	Fr
LB	19	Langston Hardy	So
DB	21	Lee Molette III	Jr
DB	22	Reggie Akles	Sr
LB	23	Alfred Chea	Sr
LB	24	Julien Simon	Jr
LB	28	Jon Morris	Fr
LB	29	Kaleb Stewart	Fr
LB	31	Kalen Villanueva	Jr
LB	32	Oumar Diomande	Fr
DL	33	Kervins Choute	Jr
DB	34	Carter Boskovich	Fr
DB	35	Drew Buckley	So
DB	36	Chase Fountain	Fr
LB	37	Hayden Pegg	Fr
DL	44	Timothy Passmore Jr	So
DL	50	Brandon Kelly	Fr
LB	51	Roberto Salas	Fr
DL	55	Cleto Chol	Fr
LB	57	Ed Entsiwah	Fr
LB	58	Donovan Branch	Jr
DL	59	Eddie Dresch	Fr
DL	88	Cooper Ackerman	Fr
DL	90	Pryce Yates	Jr
DL	91	Brady Fodor	Fr
DL	92	Jevon Banks	Sr
DL	93	Jack Barton	GS
DL	94	Matt Hoffman	So
DL	96	Dal'mont Gourdine	Sr
DL	97	Jelani Stafford	Sr
DT	98	Jaavon Brown	Jr
DL	99	Jayden Simon	GS

Special teams

Pos.	#	Name	Class
P	17	Connor Stutz	Jr
K	28	Chris Freeman	GS
LS	42	Logan Frederic	So
LS	43	Kyle Vaccarella	Sr
P	45	Seth Turner	Fr
LS	46	Zach Christinat	Fr
P	47	Nathaniel Wallace-Dilling	Fr

Head coach

- Jim L. Mora

Coordinators/assistant coaches

- Gordon Sammis
  Offensive coordinator / Offensive Line
- Matt Brock
  Defensive coordinator
- Doug Shearer
  Special teams coordinator
- Christian Pace
  Tight Ends
- Brad Robbins
  Quarterbacks / Pass Game Coordinator
- Antonio Wilcox
  Running Backs
- Siriki Diabate
  Linebackers / Run Game Coordinator
- Kashif Moore
  Wide Receivers
- Dalton Hilliard
  Secondary / Pass Game Coordinator
- Kenny McClendon
  Defensive line

Legend

- (C) Team captain
- (S) Suspended
- (I) Ineligible
- Injured
- Redshirt

Roster
Last update: August 10, 2024

=== Coaching staff additions ===
Name	Position	Old team	Old position
Matt Brock	Defensive coordinator	Mississippi State	Defensive coordinator
Jason Thoren	Senior defensive analyst	Mississippi State	Defensive senior analyst
Brad Robbins	Quarterbacks/pass game coordinator	Tennessee Tech	Pass game coordinator/wide receivers

=== Coaching staff departures ===
Name	Position	New Team	New Position
Nick Charlton	Offensive coordinator/Quarterbacks	Cleveland Browns	Offensive assistant

==== Transfers out ====
Name	Pos.	Height	Weight	Year	Hometown	New school
Brian Brewton	RB	5’6	173	Junior	Miami, FL	Middle Tennessee
Cam Ross	WR	5’10	181	Redshirt Senior	Washington D.C.	James Madison
Zion Turner	QB	6’0	203	Redshirt Sophomore	Fort Lauderdale, FL	Jacksonville State
Justin Joly	TE	6’3	235	Junior	New Rochelle, NY	NC State
Yakiri Walker	IOL	6’2	270	Redshirt Junior	DeSoto, TX	Colorado
Mumu Bin-Wahad	CB	5’11	185	Sophomore	Loganville, GA	Navarro
Jalen Mitchell	RB	5’11	210	Graduate	Rockledge, FL	Tennessee Tech
Carter Hooper	DL	6’5	266	Redshirt Sophomore	Toronto, ON	South Dakota
Dayne Shor	OT	6’5	306	Redshirt Sophomore	Alpharetta, GA	Akron
James Burns	WR	5’9	165	Senior	Charlotte, NC	Prairie View A&M
Devontae Houston	RB	5’10	163	Junior	Roanoke, AL	East Tennessee State
Jaylen Jones	LB	5’11	210	Redshirt Junior	Houston, TX	
Will Meyer	IOL	6’2	317	Junior	Arlington, MA	
Joe McFadden	K	5’10	188	Redshirt Sophomore	Southlake, TX	
Armauni Archie	CB	6’0	182	Graduate	Vallejo, CA	Louisiana Tech
Nathan Voorhis	LB	6’3	254	Sophomore	Stroudsburg, PA	Bryant
Dajon Harrison	WR	5’10	170	Redshirt Sophomore	Hutto, TX	Utah Tech
Ta'Quan Roberson	QB	6’0	200	Senior	Orange, NJ	Kansas State
Noe Ruelas	K	6’1	170	Junior	West Hartford, CT	James Madison
Chris Shearin	CB	5’11	177	Senior	Suffork, VA	James Madison

==== Transfers in ====
Name	Pos.	Height	Weight	Year	Hometown	Old school
Julien Simon	LB	6’1	227	Redshirt Junior	Tacoma, WA	Tulsa
Aaron Key	LB	6’2	232	Graduate	Tucker, GA	Western Kentucky
Wes Hoeh	IOL	6’3	276	Senior	Glen Ellyn, IL	Syracuse
Kervins Choute	DL	6’3	302	Graduate	Deerfield Beach, FL	UCF
Reggie Akles	CB	6’1	190	Senior	Troutdale, OR	New Mexico State
Connor Stutz	P	6’1	217	Graduate	Seattle, WA	Sacramento State
Malachi McLean	S	5’11	175	Junior	Manvel, TX	New Mexico State
Jasaiah Gathings	WR	6’0	190	Redshirt Junior	Statesville, NC	Akron
Skyler Bell	WR	6’0	195	Redshirt Junior	Watertown, CT	Wisconsin
Durell Robinson	RB	6’1	200	Redshirt Freshman	Baltimore, MD	Charlotte
Jarvarius Sims	CB	6’0	190	Junior	Lithonia, GA	Central Michigan
Jordan Wright	CB	6’0	178	Redshirt Junior	Memphis, TN	Kansas State
Jayden Simon	DL	6’2	330	Graduate	Tacoma, WA	Tulsa
Chris Freeman	K	6’1	199	Graduate	Zionsville, IN	Indiana
Mel Brown	RB	5’8	176	Junior	Stone Mountain, GA	Gardner-Webb
Malik Thomas Jr	RB	5’11	203	Senior	Danbury, CT	Central Connecticut State
TJ Sheffield	WR	5’11	190	Redshirt Senior	Thompson's Station, TN	Purdue
Nick Evers	QB	6’3	195	Redshirt Sophomore	Flower Mound, TX	Wisconsin
Ezeriah Anderson	WR	6’5	210	Redshirt Senior	Seffner, FL	Campbell
Jack Barton	EDGE	6’4	264	Redshirt Senior	Alpharetta, GA	Georgia Tech
Jevon Banks	DL	6’2	290	Junior	Olive Branch, MS	Kansas State
Ja'Khi Green	IOL	6’6	290	Redshirt Sophomore	Palmer Park, MD	Charlotte
Shamar Porter	WR	6’2	205	Redshirt Freshman	Nashville, TN	Kentucky
Jayden Bass	OT	6’6	309	Freshman	Springfield, MA	Syracuse
Jayden McDonald	LB	6’0	227	Senior	Suwanee, GA	Indiana
Drew Buckley	DB	5’9	190	Sophomore	Fairfield, CT	Ithaca
Kyle Vaccarella	LS	6'3	229	Graduate	Fairfield, CT	Auburn

== NFL draft ==
One Husky was selected in the 2025 NFL draft following the season.

Round	Pick	Player	Position	NFL team
6	206	Chase Lundt	Offensive tackle	Buffalo Bills
