= Skin Deep (1989 film) =

1989 film by Blake Edwards

- Theatrical release poster
- Directed by: Blake Edwards
- Written by: Blake Edwards
- Produced by: Tony Adams
- Starring: John Ritter; Vincent Gardenia; Alyson Reed; Julianne Phillips; Chelsea Field
- Cinematography: Isidore Mankofsky
- Edited by: Robert Pergament
- Music by: Don Grady; Henry Mancini; Ivan Neville
- Production company: Morgan Creek Productions
- Distributed by: 20th Century Fox
- Release date: March 3, 1989
- Running time: 101 minutes
- Country: United States
- Language: English
- Budget: $8.5 million
- Box office: $45 million

Skin Deep is a 1989 American dark romantic sex comedy film written and directed by Blake Edwards and starring John Ritter. The film was produced by Morgan Creek Productions and released by 20th Century Fox on March 3, 1989, receiving mixed to negative reviews from critics and grossing $45 million against an $8.5 million budget.

== Plot ==
Zach Hutton is a successful author with a weakness for alcohol and beautiful women. The tumultuous course of his life takes a dramatic turn when his mistress Angie Smith catches him cheating with her attractive hairdresser Tina. This discovery is followed by a perilous encounter, as his estranged wife, Alex, stumbles upon the scene, finding Angie poised to shoot Zach with his own revolver.

As the relationships crumble, Zach embarks on a self-destructive journey marked by binge-drinking and seeking solace in a string of women. He neglects work, exacerbates tensions with Alex, and even attends a formal party in a genie's costume while inebriated.

Zach's escapades include a tumultuous affair with a volatile woman named Molly, who subjects him to a skin-treatment electro-therapy machine, causing quivering spasms from head to toe. Another episode unfolds in total darkness, with Zach wearing a luminous condom as he prepares for an encounter with a woman named Amy McKenna. Unexpectedly, Amy's boyfriend Rick Curry returns to the hotel room similarly attired, leading to a frantic glow-in-the-dark fight.

After disrupting Alex's wedding day, Zach confronts the realization that his lifestyle has spiraled out of control. Motivated to change, he sobers up, refrains from womanizing, and rediscovers his passion for writing. Against all odds, he achieves the trifecta of recovery, ultimately winning back Alex's love, proving her initial doubts about his transformation wrong.

== Cast ==
- John Ritter as Zachary "Zach" Hutton
- Vincent Gardenia as Barney
- Alyson Reed as Alexandra "Alex" Hutton
- Joel Brooks as Jake Fedderman
- Julianne Phillips as Molly
- Chelsea Field as Amy McKenna
- Peter Donat as Leon "Sparky" Sparks
- Don Gordon as Curt Ames
- Nina Foch as Marge
- Denise Crosby as Angela "Angie" Smith
- Michael Kidd as Dr. Westford
- Dee Dee Rescher as Bernice Fedderman
- Bryan Genesse as Rick Curry
- Bo Foxworth as Greg
- Raye Hollitt as Lonnie Jones
- Jean Marie McKee as Rebecca "Becky"
- Brenda Swanson as Emily
- Heidi Paine as Tina

== Production ==
A glaring production issue is visible in the final film. John Ritter is bearded throughout the movie and for the majority of the film he has an actual beard. There were clearly some random scenes that were re-shot after he shaved his beard and in those scenes he's sporting a clearly artificial beard that does not match his actual beard very closely.

== Reception ==
=== Critical reception ===
The film received mixed to negative reviews. The film earned a 36% "Rotten" rating on Rotten Tomatoes, based on 28 critics. The consensus summarizes: "John Ritter's charm goes a long way, but aside from a few funny moments, Skin Deep sees writer-director Blake Edwards recycling his own material." On Metacritic, the film has a weighted average score of 43 out of 100 based on 12 critics, indicating "mixed or average reviews".

However, many critics praised John Ritter's performance in the film. One of the few positive reviews was by Roger Ebert, who wrote, "The daring thing Edwards does in Skin Deep is to try to combine two entirely different tones within the same film. This is a smart, sensitive film that knows a lot about human nature."

=== Box office ===
Despite negative reviews, the film was a financial success grossing $20 million in the United States and Canada and $25 million internationally, for a worldwide total of $45 million.

== Soundtrack ==
- "Falling Out of Love" performed by Ivan Neville
- "Just to Keep You Satisfied" performed by Marvin Gaye
- "I Can't Go Home" performed by The Robert Cray Band
- "It's Just a Matter of Time" performed by Brook Benton
- "Skin Deep" performed by Debra Holland
- "Songbird" performed by Kenny G
- "Dreamin'" performed by Vanessa Williams
- "Eine Kleine Nachtmusik" performed by The Falla Trio
- "Have You Met Miss Jones?" written by Richard Rodgers and Lorenz Hart (not credited in the film)
- "My Romance" written by Richard Rodgers and Lorenz Hart (not credited in the film)
- Film score and additional incidental music by Henry Mancini (not credited in the film)
- Additional incidental music by Cole Porter (not credited in the film)

The song "Killer Love" by Al Jarreau was intended to be used in the film, but was omitted at the last minute. The song was released on Jarreau's 1988 album Heart's Horizon.
