= Timothy Britten Parker =

American actor; brother of Sarah Jessica Parker

- Born: February 8, 1962 (age 64); Iowa City, Iowa, U.S.
- Other name: Toby
- Occupation: Actor
- Years active: 1976–present
- Spouse: Tiffany Denise Hayzlett (m. 2004)
- Relatives: Sarah Jessica Parker (sister); Pippin Parker (brother)

Timothy Britten Parker (born February 8, 1962), also known as Toby Parker, is an American actor.

== Background ==
Parker was born in Iowa City, Iowa, the eldest son of Barbara (née Keck) and Stephen Parker. They divorced and his mother married Paul Forste, who had been a babysitter to the three Parker children. The family moved to Cincinnati, Ohio. The Forstes had four more children.

Parker initially studied, with his sister, at the Cincinnati Ballet on full scholarship. His mother, Barbara, said in a 2023 interview that television was "discouraged" and each of her children were encouraged to take a library book with them when leaving the house. “The kids got free lunches for a while, which was embarrassing,” she said. “But I don’t think that we ever lived in an impoverished situation where there was no culture.”

He moved to New York City with his family in 1977 as he began pursuing his professional career. Toby is one of eight children. He has three brothers and four sisters, most of whom also have careers in the entertainment industry, including siblings Sarah Jessica Parker and Pippin Parker.

== Professional career ==
In October 1976, Parker made his Broadway debut as an understudy at the Morosco Theatre in a revival of the play The Innocents, adapted and directed by Harold Pinter.

He and his siblings performed in a touring production of "The Sound of Music."

The family moved to New York City in 1978 and his parents managed his career and that of his siblings. That same year, he was cast in Runaways, which made its Off-Broadway premiere at The Public Theater and later moved to Broadway at the Plymouth Theatre. He was in the original cast of The Visit at Criterion Center Stage Right in 1992, in which he played the roles of Ottilie Schill, Pedro Cabral, and Wechsler.

In 1996, he joined Anthony Rapp, Adam Pascal, Daphne Rubin-Vega, Taye Diggs, Wilson Jermaine Heredia, and Idina Menzel in the Broadway cast of Rent. His roles included Gordon in "Life Support", the man in "Christmas Bells", Mr. Grey in "La Vie Boheme", and others. His voice can be heard on the original Broadway cast recording of Rent. He appeared with the rest of the cast to perform "Seasons of Love" and "La Vie Boheme" at the 1996 Tony Awards. Among the four awards the show won that evening was a Tony Award for Best Musical. The original cast has reunited to celebrate the show's 5th and 10th anniversaries in special one-night concerts. Parker joined the original cast at the Final Broadway Production of Rent, where the final cast and original cast sang an encore of "Seasons of Love".

Since 1991, Parker had a recurring role as a Forensics Technician on Law & Order with Rent co-star Jesse L. Martin. His film credits include Marshall Fine in Gold Coast; Bill in The Last Supper; and the M.C./King of Comedy in Joey Breaker.

=== Wicked (as Dr. Dillamond) ===
Parker originated the role of Doctor Dillamond on the First National US Tour of the musical Wicked, which began previews in Toronto on March 9, 2005 and opened March 31. He left the cast on March 5, 2006 to join the show's sit-down production in Chicago, replacing Steven Skybell on March 28, 2006. He left the Chicago cast on December 10, 2006.

He originated the role of Doctor Dillamond in the Los Angeles sit-down production, which opened on February 21, 2007, following previews on February 10. He played his final performance on May 25, 2008.

He reprised the role in the Broadway production, beginning performances on September 2, 2008, again replacing Skybell.

On October 27, 2008, he appeared in "The Yellow Brick Road Not Taken", a one night only benefit performance celebrating the fifth anniversary of Wicked.

He played Doctor Dillamond in early drafted scenes that were cut from the final version of the musical. After over two years in the Broadway company, making him the longest-running Broadway Dillamond to date, he played his final performance October 31, 2010.

After a year away from the show and Doctor Dillamond, Parker returned to the role in the Second National US Tour company, marking his fourth North American production. He replaced Martin Moran on December 20, 2011, and he played his last show on September 30, 2012. From March 20 through April 14, 2013, he returned to the first touring production, where he created the role in 2005, covering in the absence of Clifton Davis.

On September 23, 2014, he returned to the show on Broadway, replacing K. Todd Freeman as Doctor Dillamond and played his final performance on January 31, 2016.

== Naked Angels ==
Along with eleven other theater artists, including his brother Pippin Parker, Toby co-founded Naked Angels Theater Company in New York City in 1986. It operated out of a defunct picture-frame factory on Seventeenth Street and attracted actors including Marisa Tomei, Fisher Stevens, and Gina Gershon. “Everybody hung around Naked Angels,” Parker said in a 2023 profile in The New Yorker. This group included Matthew Broderick, who would later marry his sister Sarah Jessica Parker.

== Personal life ==
Parker married Tiffany Denise Hayzlett June 12, 2004, in Staatsburg, New York. She served as a producer and production manager on Sex and the City and the series Vinyl.
