= Jim L. Mora =

American football player and coach (born 1961)

Jim Mora
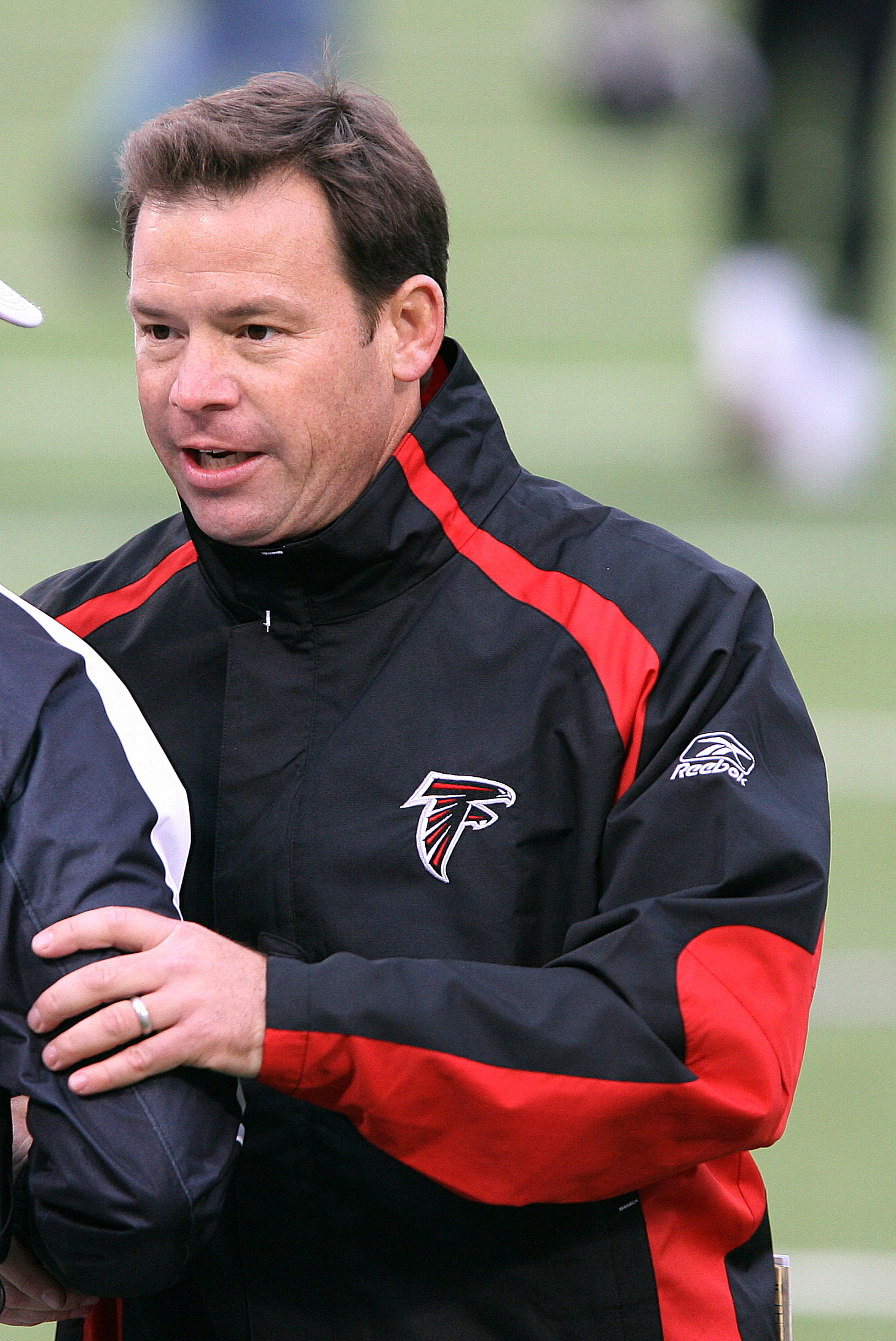
- Mora in 2006

Current position
- Title: Head coach
- Team: Colorado State
- Conference: Pac-12
- Record: 3–8
- Annual salary: $2.4 million

Biographical details
- Born: November 19, 1961 (age 65); Los Angeles, California, U.S.

Playing career
- 1980–1983: Washington
- Positions: Defensive back, linebacker

Coaching career (HC unless noted)
- 1984: Washington (GA)
- 1985: San Diego Chargers (defensive QC)
- 1986–1988: San Diego Chargers (assistant DB)
- 1989–1991: San Diego Chargers (DB)
- 1992–1996: New Orleans Saints (DB)
- 1997–1998: San Francisco 49ers (DB)
- 1999–2003: San Francisco 49ers (DC)
- 2004–2006: Atlanta Falcons
- 2007–2008: Seattle Seahawks (AHC/DB)
- 2009: Seattle Seahawks
- 2012–2017: UCLA
- 2021: UConn (OA)
- 2022–2025: UConn
- 2026–present: Colorado State

Head coaching record
- Overall: 76–61 (college); 31–33 (NFL)
- Bowls: 3–3
- Tournaments: 1–1 (NFL playoffs)

Accomplishments and honors

Championships
- Pac-12 South Division (2012)

James Lawrence Mora (born November 19, 1961) is an American football coach who is the head coach at Colorado State University. He recently was the head coach at the University of Connecticut for four seasons and at UCLA from 2012 to 2017. Prior to taking the job at UCLA, Mora served as a head coach in the National Football League (NFL), coaching the Atlanta Falcons from 2004 to 2006 and Seattle Seahawks in 2009. He has also served as an analyst for NFL Network and Fox Sports.

Mora played college football with the Washington Huskies from 1980 to 1983, and began his coaching career there as a graduate assistant in 1984. He is the son of retired NFL head coach Jim E. Mora. To avoid confusion with his father, Mora is sometimes called Jim Mora Jr.

== Early years and playing career ==
As the son of an assistant coach in college football, Mora lived in various locations in the West as a child: primarily in Boulder, Colorado (ages 7–12) and also in California, mostly in the Los Angeles area. When Mora was 12, his father left Colorado after the 1973 season to join the staff at UCLA under first-year head coach Dick Vermeil.

After one season in Los Angeles, the elder Mora accepted a position at the University of Washington under new head coach Don James, and the Moras moved north from Los Angeles to the Seattle area when the younger Mora was 13. His father coached the defensive line at UW for three seasons, then moved over to the pro ranks with the Seattle Seahawks in 1978, where he coached for four years under Jack Patera. The younger Mora attended Hyak Junior High and Interlake High School in Bellevue, and graduated in 1980.

Mora attended the University of Washington, where he walked-on and was a reserve defensive back / linebacker for the Huskies from 1980 to 1983. He appeared in two Rose Bowls (January 1981, 1982) and was a member of the Lambda Chi Alpha fraternity. Mora graduated from Washington in 1984 and began his coaching career under James as a graduate assistant for the Huskies, then moved to the professional ranks the following year with the San Diego Chargers.

== Coaching career ==
=== Assistant coach ===
Mora hired on as a quality control coach with the San Diego Chargers in 1985, and moved up to assistant defensive backs coach the following year. He was promoted to defensive backs coach in 1989. In 1992, he went to the New Orleans Saints to coach under his father, head coach Jim E. Mora. In 1997, the younger Mora moved to the San Francisco 49ers to coach under Steve Mariucci, and became the 49ers' defensive coordinator in 1999 until 2003.

=== Atlanta Falcons ===
In 2004, Mora was hired by the Atlanta Falcons as their head coach with a five-year, $7.5 million contract. He led the Falcons to a record of 11–5 and a first round bye in the playoffs. Atlanta hosted and defeated the St. Louis Rams 47–17 in the divisional round and advanced to the NFC Championship Game where they lost 27–10 on the road to the Philadelphia Eagles. For his efforts Mora was honored with the NFC Coach of the year award.

In 2005, the Falcons went 8–8 and Mora characterized the season as a "disappointing year." This non-winning season continued one of the NFL's strangest records – the Falcons had never had back-to-back winning seasons in the history of the franchise, a 40-year statistical oddity that no other modern professional team has matched. This record ended in 2009. Following the 2005 season, Mora signed a three-year contract extension with the Falcons, which guaranteed the final two years of his original five-year deal, and added a sixth in 2009.

The national media and the Falcons fans had high expectations in the 2006 season. While in the wild card race at 7–6 in December, Atlanta lost their final three games, including two at home, and missed the playoffs for a second straight year with a 7–9 record overall. On December 14, while the Falcons were still statistically alive in their quest for the playoffs, Mora said during a radio interview with Dave "Softy" Mahler and former Huskies teammate/roommate Hugh Millen on Seattle sports-talk radio station KJR-AM that, if it were offered, he would take the head coaching job at the University of Washington (a job that was not open), "even if [the Falcons] were in a playoff run." He additionally said he was "dead serious" about his desire for the Washington job. While Mora later backpedaled and claimed that he was only kidding, team owner Arthur Blank publicly expressed his disapproval of Mora's comments.

Following the season, the Atlanta Falcons announced that they had fired Mora. Arthur Blank told the media,

This was an extremely difficult decision for us. We had the highest hopes and aspirations for a long run with Jim as our coach, but we feel this decision is in the best long-term interests of our franchise. I have great respect for Jim's passion for the game, and we wish Jim and his family all of the best.

=== Seattle Seahawks ===
The Seattle Seahawks hired Mora as assistant head coach and defensive backs coach on January 21, 2007. Following the 2007 season, Mora interviewed for the Washington Redskins head coaching job after Joe Gibbs resigned, but Mora declined the position to stay with the Seahawks. Mora was announced as the successor to Mike Holmgren prior to the 2008 season and signed a five-year contract through the 2012 season, estimated at $4 million per year.

Mora was officially named the seventh head coach in franchise history in 2009, upon Holmgren's retirement after the 2008 season. His first official press conference as the new Seahawks head coach was given on January 13, 2009, where he enthusiastically shared his vision of bringing a Super Bowl championship to Seattle and having a championship parade from the Space Needle to the Seahawks' stadium, Qwest Field.

After going 5–11 in his only season as Seahawks head coach, Mora was fired on January 8, 2010, with three years and $12 million remaining on his contract. Mora was replaced by former USC head coach Pete Carroll.

Mora turned to broadcasting after being fired from the Seahawks when he became a commentator with the NFL Network.

=== UCLA ===
On December 10, 2011, the UCLA Bruins announced the hiring of Mora as head coach, replacing alumnus Rick Neuheisel. Mora signed a five-year contract for $12 million, plus incentives. He immediately went to work as the head coach by hiring Adrian Klemm, Steve Broussard, Demetrice Martin and Eric Yarber as assistant coaches. Less than two months later, the results came early, as UCLA landed a consensus No. 12-ranked recruiting class in 2012 after having a class ranked in the high 40s at Rick Neuheisel's departure. In his first season as head coach, the 2012 UCLA team went 9–5, including a victory over rival USC by a score of 38–28 and clinching the Pac-12 South title for the second year in a row. Standout players that year included freshman quarterback Brett Hundley, NFL first-round draft pick defensive end Datone Jones, and UCLA's all-time leading rusher Johnathan Franklin. Building on the team's success, Mora landed the No. 11-ranked recruiting class of 2013, UCLA's highest-ranked recruiting class in the last two decades. During the 2013 season, Mora and the Bruins finished 10–3 with notable wins over No. 23 ranked Nebraska (41–21) and No. 23 ranked USC (35–14), and a Sun Bowl win against Virginia Tech (42–12). In 2014, he led UCLA to their ninth 10-win season in school history, and just the third time in their history that they have won 10 games in consecutive seasons. In 2015 he led the program to a 8-5 record, however they lost the Foster Farms Bowl to the Nebraska Cornhuskers.

Because of his success at UCLA, Mora was courted by his alma mater, the University of Washington, to fill their vacated head coaching position. During his time as head coach of the Atlanta Falcons, Mora jokingly described the position at the University of Washington as his "dream job." However, Mora turned down a reputed offer and extended his contract with UCLA for another six years, stating that he wants to eventually "hopefully retire" as head coach of UCLA. Weeks later, Mora reaffirmed his intent to remain UCLA's head football coach by turning down a reputed offer for the head coaching position with the University of Texas.

Jim Mora was fired on November 19, 2017, one day after UCLA's third consecutive loss to its crosstown rival USC. After going 29–11 through the first 3 seasons, he was 17–19 in the last 3 seasons.

=== UConn ===
The University of Connecticut hired Mora as its head football coach on November 11, 2021. Interim head coach Lou Spanos, finished out the 2021 season, with Mora serving as an offensive assistant in the meantime. During his first season as head coach, on November 12, 2022, UConn beat AP-ranked #19 Liberty 36–33 improving their record to 6–5; Mora led UConn to their first bowl appearance since 2015. They were defeated by the Marshall Thundering Herd in the Myrtle Beach Bowl. After a down year in 2023, Mora led UConn to one of their best seasons in years during the 2024 season going 9-4 including a 27-14 win over North Carolina in the Fenway Bowl, marking the program's first bowl game win since 2009. At the end of the year Mora was named Coach of the Year by the Gridiron Club of Greater Boston, as well as Independent/PAC12 Coach of the Year by College Football Live. In November 2025 in the midst of his second 9 win season in a row with UConn, Mora was hired as the head coach for Colorado State.

=== Colorado State ===
Colorado State University hired Mora as its 25th head football coach on November 26, 2025.

== Broadcasting career ==
Following the Seahawks firing him after the 2009 season, Mora accepted a position as a commentator with the NFL Network. During the 2010 season Fox Sports announced that Mora would be serving as a color analyst on the network's NFL coverage for the 2010 season. He was a sideline reporter and teamed with play-by-play announcer Dick Stockton and analyst Charles Davis to call regional games. During NFL Network's Thursday Night Football schedule, Mora, alongside analysts Kurt Warner, Sterling Sharpe, Brian Billick, Jay Glazer, and host Fran Charles could be seen on Thursday Night Kickoff. Mora and Billick could also be seen every Monday during the season on The Coaches Show, providing a breakdown of the biggest storylines and decisions behind Sunday's matchups from a head coach's perspective.

Mora returned to the booth in 2018 following his termination from UCLA, joining ESPN's college football coverage.

== Personal life ==
Mora has separated from his wife, Shannon. They have a daughter, Lillia, and three sons, Cole, Ryder, and Trey.

Mora has two brothers, Stephen, a mortgage broker in Bend, Oregon and Michael, an architect in Seattle. With the middle name Lawrence after his grandfather, Mora is not a junior, as his father's middle name is Ernest.

The Moras run the Count On Me Family Foundation, an organization that targets children from low socio-economic backgrounds, children with mental and physical disabilities, and children deemed "at-risk," as well as those that lack stability or support in their lives.

== Head coaching record ==
=== NFL ===
Team	Year	Regular season					Postseason			
Team	Year	Won	Lost	Ties	Win %	Finish	Won	Lost	Win %	Result
ATL	2004	11	5	0	.688	1st in NFC South	1	1	.500	Lost to Philadelphia Eagles in NFC Championship Game
ATL	2005	8	8	0	.500	3rd in NFC South	–	–	–	–
ATL	2006	7	9	0	.438	3rd in NFC South	–	–	–	–
ATL Total		26	22	0	.542		1	1	.500	
SEA	2009	5	11	0	.313	3rd in NFC West	–	–	–	–
SEA Total		5	11	0	.313		0	0	.000	
Total		31	33	0	.470		1	1	.500	

=== College ===
Year	Team	Overall	Conference	Standing	Bowl/playoffs	Coaches^{#}	AP^{°}
UCLA Bruins (Pac-12 Conference) (2012–2017)
2012	UCLA	9–5	6–3	1st (South)	L Holiday		
2013	UCLA	10–3	6–3	T–2nd (South)	W Sun	16	16
2014	UCLA	10–3	6–3	T–2nd (South)	W Alamo	10	10
2015	UCLA	8–5	5–4	3rd (South)	L Foster Farms		
2016	UCLA	4–8	2–7	T–4th (South)			
2017	UCLA	5–6 (Note: Mora was dismissed from UCLA prior to the final regular season game against California. The standings reflects the team's position at the time of Mora's departure.)	3–5	4th (South)			
UCLA:		46–30	28–25				
UConn Huskies (NCAA Division I FBS independent) (2022–2025)
2022	UConn	6–7			L Myrtle Beach		
2023	UConn	3–9					
2024	UConn	9–4			W Fenway		
2025	UConn	9–3			Fenway*		
UConn:		27–23		*Left for Colorado State prior to bowl game			
Colorado State Rams (Pac-12 Conference) (2026–present)
2026	Colorado State	3–8	1–6				
Colorado State:		3–8	1-6				
Total:		76–61					
National championship Conference title Conference division title or championship game berth
^{#}Rankings from final Coaches Poll.; ^{°}Rankings from final AP Poll.
