= Jenifer Estess =

American theatre manager/producer

Jenifer Estess (February 17, 1963 – December 16, 2003) was a Moline, Illinois-born theatre producer. She began her career as an actor after graduating from New York University with a B.A. in drama.

Estess was a co-founder of Naked Angels theatre company in Manhattan; she was its producing director until 1993. She helped found the Nantucket Film Festival and the New York Women's Film Festival.

Her memoir, Tales from the Bed: Living, Dying and Having It All, was published posthumously in 2004, while a TV movie of her life had previously been aired on CBS in 2001, titled Jenifer, which starred Laura San Giacomo in the title role. Estess also started Project ALS, which raises funds for finding a cure for Lou Gehrig's disease, from which she suffered. She helped raise over $17,000,000 (USD) for the Project.

In 2000, Estess testified before Senator Arlen Specter’s sub-committee on Labor, Health, Human Services and Education. "My life and millions of others are in the hands of Congress. We are already seeing the incredible potential of stem cells to replace what is destroyed in ALS, but we need the federal government to mentor research along in the most responsible, humane way." Pointing out that, "non-profits like Project A.L.S. and private industry have started stem cell replacement on the right track," she urged Congress to "do the right thing and take us to the next level with this life-saving science."

== Death ==
Jenifer Estess died from A.L.S. on December 16, 2003, aged 40, at her apartment in Manhattan.
