= Naked Angels (theater company) =

Off-Broadway theatre company in New York City

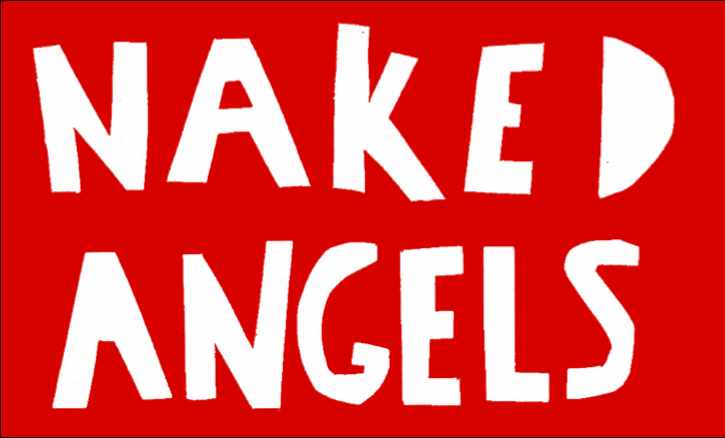

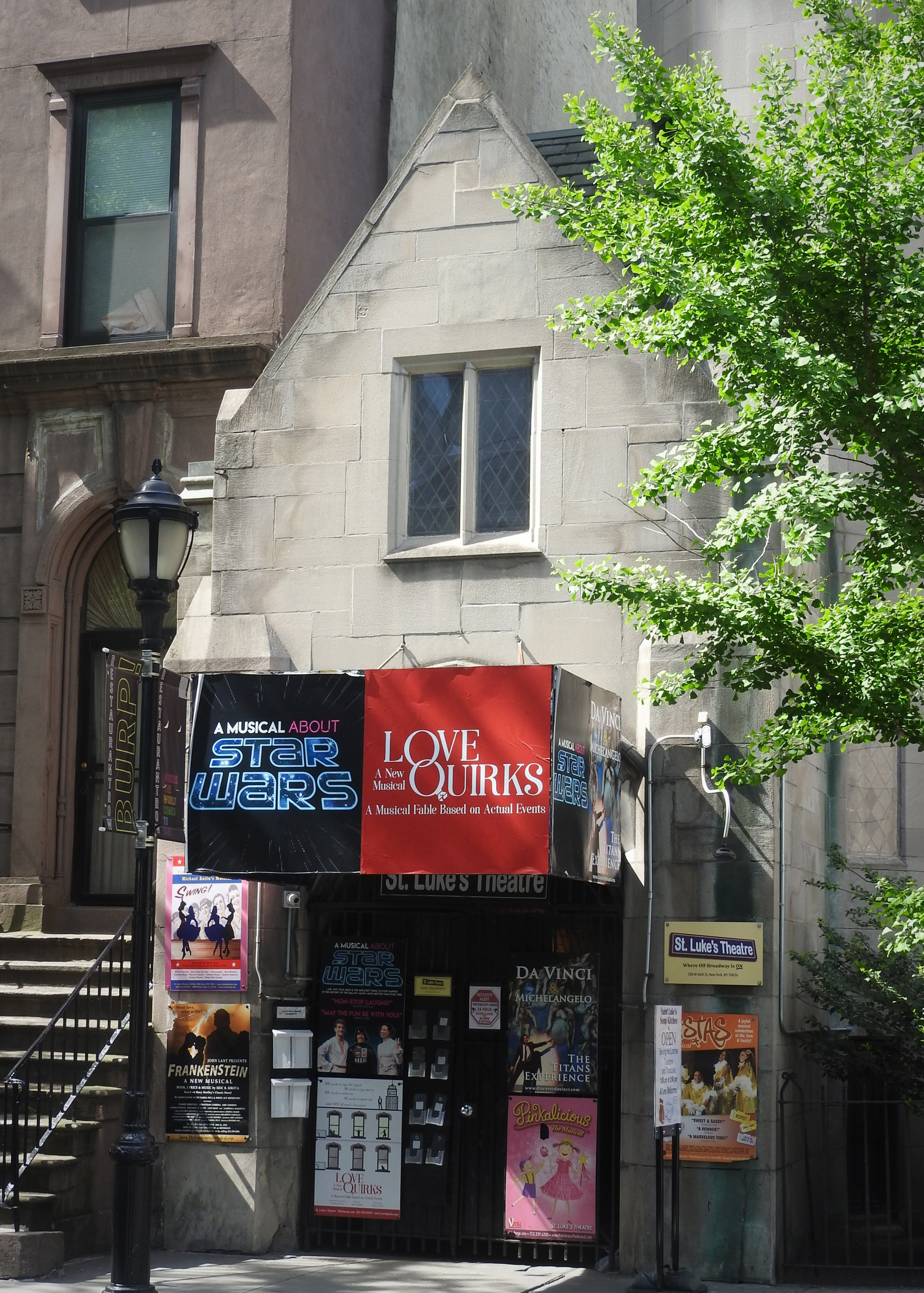
- Type: Off-Broadway theatre company
- Location(s): St. Luke's Theatre; Manhattan, New York City
- Website: www.nakedangels.com

Naked Angels is an Off-Broadway theatre company founded in 1986 by a collective of theatre artists in a converted picture frame factory in Manhattan, New York City. The company’s name was inspired by John Tytell’s book Naked Angels, about the Beat Generation. They are known for developing new works through Tuesdays@9, the longest-running cold reading series in America.

The company has premiered works that have transferred to Broadway and been adapted for film, including Richard Linklater’s Tape, starring Ethan Hawke, Robert Sean Leonard and Uma Thurman.

== History ==
Naked Angels was founded in 1986 by an ensemble of writers, directors, actors, producers, and designers. The company originated in a defunct picture frame factory at 117 West 17th Street, often called "The Space", which quickly became a creative hub for emerging artists. By 1995, the venue closed as many founding members pursued successful careers in Hollywood and on Broadway. It was at Naked Angels that actor Matthew Broderick and his wife actress Sarah Jessica Parker began dating.

Naked Angels' board has included John F. Kennedy Jr., a friend of founding member Jack Merrill, during the 1990s. Kennedy also served as celebrity co-chair of the company's annual Valentine's Day benefit, and it was at the 1995 benefit that he was photographed with Carolyn Bessette, whom he married the following year.

By the mid-1990s, Naked Angels transitioned from a collectively run ensemble to a company guided by an Artistic Director. Artistic leadership during this era included founding members Tim Ransom, Geoffrey Nauffts, and Pippin Parker, as well as producers Jenny Gersten, Andy Donald, and Liz Carlson. In 2017, founding member Jean Marie McKee became Artistic Director, leading the company toward a focus on program-based development and community engagement.

Since 2023, Naked Angels has served as a company-in-residence with Out of the Box Theatrics, hosting its New York programming at Theatre 154 on Christopher Street. In 2026, both organizations relocated to St. Luke's Theatre, a 174-seat Off-Broadway venue in Manhattan’s Theater District.

Naked Angels' office is located within The New School for Drama.

== Programs ==
Launched in 1991 in response to the Gulf War, Tuesdays@9 began as an outlet for artists to process current events. It has since become Naked Angels’ flagship weekly series for new works-in-progress. Hosted in New York City, Los Angeles, Chicago, and Miami, the program invites writers to submit short excerpts of plays, screenplays, prose, or other material, which are then cast on the spot and read aloud before a live audience of artists and supporters. Running from September through May, the series operates with an open-submission policy and remains entirely free to attend or participate.

In 2003, the company introduced 1st Mondays, a monthly reading series dedicated to full-length plays developed through Tuesdays@9. Each selected play is given a public reading with a director, cast, and brief rehearsal period. The program has featured works that later achieved critical success, including Geoffrey Nauffts’ Broadway transfer Next Fall. 1st Mondays are held at the School of Drama at The New School.

In 2005, Naked Angels partnered with Fox to create Naked TV, an annual showcase of short plays by emerging playwrights. Several of these works were later developed into television pilots for the network.

In 2010, Jean Marie McKee established 3T Writing Workshops, the educational and outreach branch of the company. The program offers free creative writing instruction for students in New York City public schools, District 79 alternative schools, and youth in foster care.

Naked Angels has also produced The Issues Project, a long-running initiative that develops plays centered on pressing social and political themes. The series has collaborated with advocacy and humanitarian organizations such as Amnesty International and The Center for American Progress. The most recent edition of The Issues Project was presented in 2022.

== Members ==
Naked Angels has included a wide range of artists in its membership since its founding. Notable past and present members include:

=== Founding company ===
- Taro Alexander
- Jon Robin Baitz
- Patrick Breen
- Matthew Broderick
- Nicole Burdette
- Kathleen Dennehy
- Paul Eckstein
- Ned Eisenberg
- Beth Emelson
- Jenifer Estess
- Gina Gershon
- Brett Goldstein
- Paul Gruen
- Julianne Hoffenberg
- Chris Kondek
- Warren Leight
- Ilana Levine
- Kenneth Lonergan
- Brian MacDevitt
- Bruce MacVittie
- Joe Mantello
- Michael Mastro
- Michele Mayas
- Jean Marie McKee
- Jack Merrill
- Lisa Beth Miller
- Rob Morrow
- Geoffrey Nauffts
- Pippin Parker
- Sarah Jessica Parker
- Timothy Britten Parker
- Frank Pugliese
- Tim Ransom
- Ron Rifkin
- Fisher Stevens
- Billy Strong
- Lili Taylor
- Marisa Tomei
- Nancy Travis
- Christie Wagner-Lee
- Bradley White
- Gareth Williams
- Jeff Williams
- Kelly Wolf
- George Xenos
- Missy Yager

=== Later participants ===
- Will Arnett
- Stephen Belber
- David Dean Bottrell
- Ian Brennan
- Maddie Corman
- Angela Dohrmann
- Barry Edelstein
- Will Eno
- Edie Falco
- Dominic Fumusa
- David Marshall Grant
- Beth Henley
- Patrick Heusinger
- J. C. Hopkins
- John F. Kennedy Jr.
- Jonathan Larson
- Moshe Lobel
- Elizabeth Meriwether
- Mary Stuart Masterson
- Emily Mann
- Deborah Offner
- Alison Pill
- Connie Ray
- Theresa Rebeck
- Jacquelyn Reingold
- José Rivera
- Mark Ruffalo
- Will Scheffer
- David Schwimmer
- Lucy Sexton
- Helen Slater
- Chris Stack
- Josh Stamberg
- Cotter Smith
- Erin Cressida Wilson

== Productions ==
Notable productions include:

- This Wide Night by Chloë Moss, starring Edie Falco and Alison Pill
- Next Fall by Geoffrey Nauffts
- Fault Lines by Stephen Belber, directed by David Schwimmer
- Spalding Gray: Stories Left to Tell by Spalding Gray, directed by Lucy Sexton
- The Mistakes Madeline Made by Elizabeth Meriwether, starring Ian Brennan
- His Girl Friday adapted by John Guare
- Thom Pain (based on nothing) by Will Eno
- Meshugah by Emily Mann
- Tape by Stephen Belber, starring Dominic Fumusa and Josh Stamberg
- Acapulco by Jacquelyn Reingold, directed by Ned Eisenberg
- Signature by Beth Henley
- Hurricane by Erin Cressida Wilson, directed by Barry Edelstein
- Snakebit by David Marshall Grant
- Clash by Night by Clifford Odets
- Easter by Will Scheffer
