= Jean Marie McKee =

American theatre director, actress, and former model

Jean Marie McKee is an American theatre director, actress, and former model. She is the Artistic Director and a founding member of the Naked Angels theatre company in New York City.

== Career ==
McKee began her career as a model and actress after moving from rural Virginia to New York City at the age of eighteen. She appeared in film and commercial productions, including Skin Deep opposite John Ritter.

Alongside Matthew Broderick, Sarah Jessica Parker, Marisa Tomei, and other artists, McKee co-founded the theatre company Naked Angels in 1986. She became the company’s Artistic Director in 2017, overseeing its programs and partnerships, including the long-running Tuesdays@9 cold reading series and the 1st Mondays full-length play reading series. She also founded the company’s educational initiative, the 3T Writing Workshops, which provides free creative-writing instruction for youth in foster care, students in New York City public schools, and participants in alternative education programs.

== Personal life ==
McKee has two children. Her daughter, Imogene Strauss, is a creative director in the music industry who has worked with artists such as Charli XCX and Clairo.
