= Joe Fagnano =

American football player (born 2001)

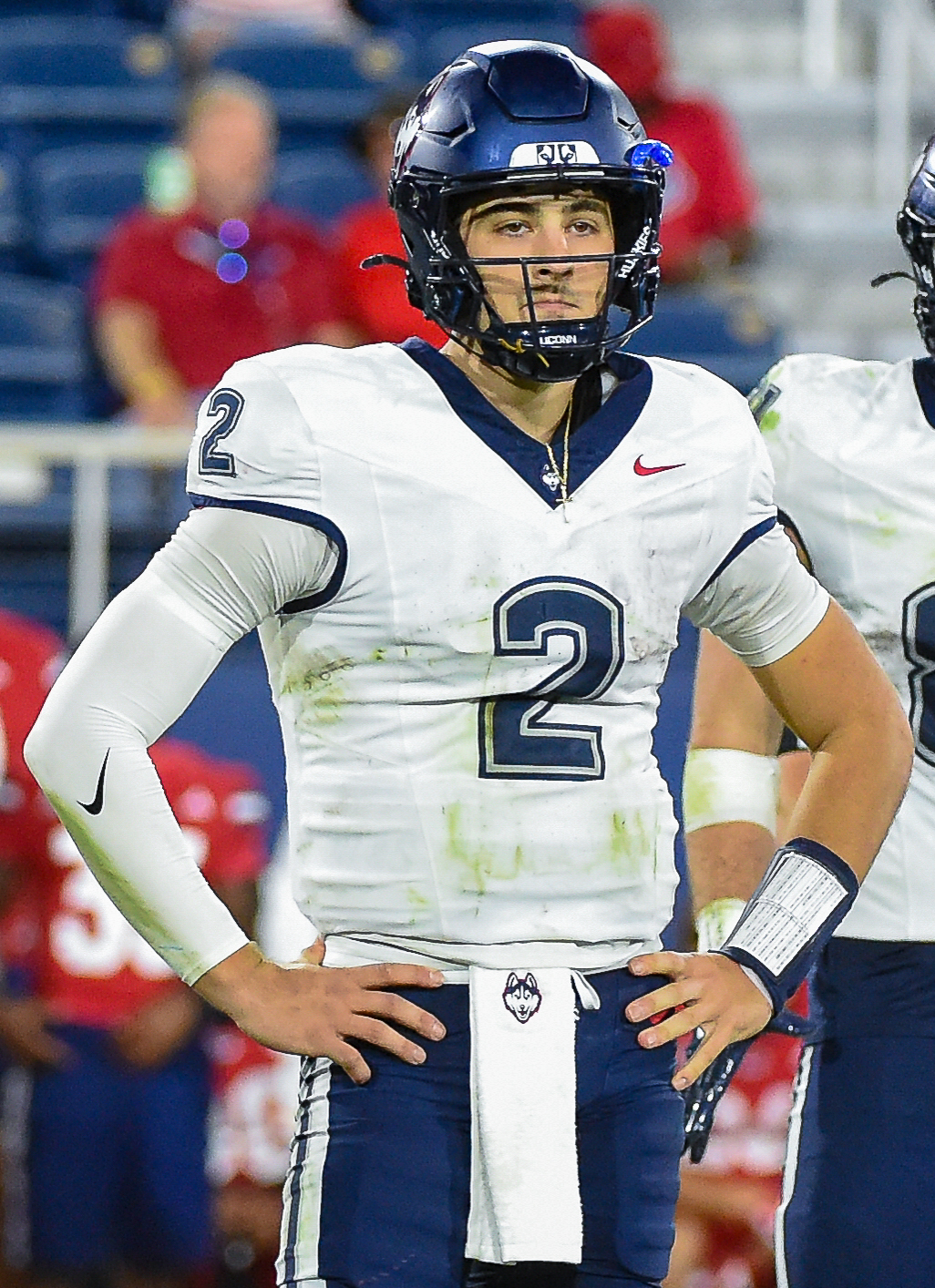
- Fagnano with UConn in 2025

No. 12 – Baltimore Ravens
- Position: Quarterback
- Roster status: Active

Personal information
- Born: March 31, 2001 (age 25); Williamsport, Pennsylvania, U.S.
- Listed height: 6 ft 3 in (1.91 m)
- Listed weight: 230 lb (104 kg)

Career information
- High school: Williamsport Area
- College: Maine (2019–2022); UConn (2023–2025)
- NFL draft: 2026: undrafted

Career history
- Baltimore Ravens (2026–present)

Awards and highlights
- Second-team All-CAA (2020)

Career NFL statistics as of Week 9, 2026
- Passing attempts: 39
- Passing completions: 20
- Completion percentage: 51.3%
- TD–INT: 0–3
- Passing yards: 151
- Passer rating: 28.9
- Rushing yards: 16
- Stats at Pro Football Reference

Joseph Fagnano (/fɑːnˈjɑːnoʊ/ fahn-YAHN-oh; born March 31, 2001) is an American professional football quarterback for the Baltimore Ravens of the National Football League (NFL). He played college football for the Maine Black Bears and UConn Huskies.

== Early life ==
Fagnano grew up in Williamsport, Pennsylvania and attended Williamsport Area High School. During high school, he was named an All-State player, the Wyoming Area Offensive Player of the Year and an East-West All-Star Game participant. He committed to play college football at Maine over an offer from Bucknell.

== College career ==
=== Maine ===
Fagnano arrived at UMaine as a walk-on, but earned a full scholarship and the backup quarterback job after an impressive fall training camp. Fagnano made his collegiate debut on October 12, after incumbent quarterback Chris Ferguson sustained a foot injury during the first quarter of a 24–17 loss to Richmond. The following week, Fagnano was named the starter. Against FBS opponent Liberty, he threw five touchdowns, completing 67% of his passes for 445 yards in a 59–44 loss. He played in eight games and started in six finishing the season with completing 121 out of 184 passing attempts with 1,835 yards and 17 touchdowns. By the end of the season, he was named the CAA Rookie of the Week for two weeks, the New England Football Writers Gold Helmet Award Winner and the team's Thurlow Cooper Offensive Rookie of the Year. During the spring 2021 season, he appeared in all four games and finished the season with completing 67 out of 116 passing attempts with 795 yards, eight touchdowns and one interception. By the end of the season, he was named the CAA Player of the Week for two weeks. During the fall 2021 season, he appeared in four games and finished the season with 65 completed passing attempts with 794 yards and six touchdowns. By the end of the season, he was named to the 2021 CFPA FCS National Player of the Year Trophy Watch List. During the 2022 season, he played in all 11 games and finished the season with a career high 208 completed passing attempts for 2,231 yards, 15 touchdowns and six interceptions. On December 5, 2022, Fagnano announced that he would be entering the transfer portal. On January 16, 2023, he announced that he would be transferring to UConn.

=== UConn ===
During the 2023 season, Fagnano was named as the starting quarterback. On September 12, 2023, after only two games, head coach Jim L. Mora announced that Fagnano would be out for the rest of the season due to a shoulder injury. He finished the season with completing 18 out of 35 passing attempts for 173 yards and one interception. Fagnano was named the Offensive MVP of the 2024 Fenway Bowl. In 2025, he did not throw an interception until Week 12 against Air Force.

== Professional career ==
Pre-draft measurables
Height	Weight	Arm length	Hand span	Wingspan	40-yard dash	10-yard split	20-yard split	20-yard shuttle	Vertical jump	Broad jump
6 ft 3 1/4 in (1.91 m)	226 lb (103 kg)	31 3/8 in (0.80 m)	9 1/4 in (0.23 m)	6 ft 7 1/2 in (2.02 m)	4.83 s	1.67 s	2.80 s	4.35 s	35.0 in (0.89 m)	9 ft 10 in (3.00 m)
All values from NFL Combine

After going undrafted in the 2026 NFL draft, Fagnano signed with the Baltimore Ravens on April 28, 2026. On November 1, Fagnano made his debut in Week 8 against the Buffalo Bills, following first-half injuries to quarterbacks Lamar Jackson and Tyler Huntley. Despite dealing with an ankle injury, he was named the starter for Week 9 versus the Jaguars. In Week 9 he went 10 for 18 with 60 yards zero touchdowns and 2 interceptions in a 33–10 loss. After they traded for Jacoby Brissett he will be the Backup with Kedon Slovis as the Third string

== Career statistics ==
Legend
**Bold**	Career high

=== NFL ===
==== Regular season ====
Year	Team	Games			Passing									Rushing					Sacks		Fumbles	
Year	Team	GP	GS	Record	Cmp	Att	Pct	Yds	Y/A	Lng	TD	Int	Rtg	Att	Yds	Avg	Lng	TD	Sck	SckY	Fum	Lost
2026	BAL	2	1	0–1	20	39	51.3	151	3.9	22	0	3	28.9	6	16	2.7	9	0	4	17	2	1
Career		2	1	0–1	20	39	51.3	151	3.9	22	0	3	28.9	6	16	2.7	9	0	4	17	2	1

==== College ====
Season	Team	Games			Passing								Rushing			
Season	Team	GP	GS	Record (Note: Accounts for only GS as a QB. In 2024, Fagnano started one game at WR.)	Cmp	Att	Pct	Yds	Avg	TD	Int	Rtg	Att	Yds	Avg	TD
2019	Maine	8	6	4–2	121	184	65.8	1,835	**10.0**	17	3	**176.8**	86	192	2.2	0
2020	Maine	4	4	2–2	67	116	57.8	795	6.9	8	1	136.4	31	59	1.9	2
2021	Maine	4	4	2–2	65	108	60.2	794	7.4	6	2	136.6	19	−12	−0.6	0
2022	Maine	11	11	2–9	209	365	57.3	2,250	6.2	15	**6**	119.3	**93**	**296**	**3.2**	**3**
2023	UConn	2	2	0–2	18	35	51.4	173	4.9	0	1	87.2	16	32	2.0	0
2024	UConn	10	6	**4–1**	120	206	58.3	1,631	7.9	20	4	152.9	30	60	2.0	1
2025	UConn	12	12	9–3	**285**	**413**	**69.0**	**3,448**	8.3	**28**	1	161.0	47	131	2.8	**3**
FCS totals		27	25	10–15	462	773	59.8	5,674	7.3	46	12	138.0	229	535	2.3	5
FBS totals		24	20	13–6	423	654	64.7	5,252	8.3	48	6	154.5	93	223	2.4	4
