= Pippin Parker =

American playwright and theatre director (born 1969)

- Born: June 22, 1969 (age 56); Syracuse, New York, U.S.
- Occupations: Playwright, theatre director
- Years active: c. 1986–present
- Relatives: Sarah Jessica Parker (sister); Timothy Britten Parker (brother)

Pippin Parker (born June 22, 1969) is an American playwright and theatre director. He was formerly dean of The New School for Drama.

== Career ==
Parker is an American playwright and director. He is the former Dean of the School of Writing, Acting, and Directing program at The New School. He is one of the co-founding members of Naked Angels, a theater company in New York City where he was Artistic director. Along with Nicole Burdette, Frank Pugliese and Kenneth Lonergan, he is a member of a writer's group for dramatic and fiction authors.

His short play A Gift was produced in New York and Los Angeles and a later radio adaptation was featured on NPR’s The Next Big Thing. Naked Angels and New York Stage and Film have both produced his play Assisted Living.

His television work includes writing episodes of the animated series The Tick and Doug, as well as the CTW educational music show for children, Jam Inn.

He directed the production of George Packer's first play Betrayed at The Culture Project, New York which won the 2008 Lucille Lortel Award for Outstanding Play.

Parker is active in the Writers Guild of America, East.

=== Stage plays ===
==== As playwright ====
- 1994 – Limbo, The Coast Playhouse, Los Angeles, performed by Naked Angels, directed by Kate Baggot
- 1996 – A Gift, Theater 3, New York
- 1997 – Passion Play, produced in Winter Shorts, Actors' Gang Theater, Hollywood, performed by Naked Angels
- 1998 – Anesthesia, New York Performance Works, Manhattan, directed by Lori Steinberg
- 1998 – Little Bites, Tiffany Theater, West Hollywood, performed by Naked Angels, directed by Josh Hamilton
- 2007 – Ever Less Free, directed by Frank Pugliese

==== As director ====
- 2004 – The Democracy Project, series of new one-act plays, The Culture Project, New York
- 2008 – Betrayed, by George Packer, The Culture Project, New York
- 2010 – A Long and Happy Life, by Bekah Brunstetter, Susan Stein Shiva Theater, Vassar College, Poughkeepsie
- 2011 – Knickerbocker, by Jonathan Marc Sherman, Public Theater, New York

== Personal life ==
He is the younger brother of Sarah Jessica Parker and Timothy Britten Parker.
