= Adam Breneman =

American football coach and former player

- Born: Adam Alexander Breneman; March 31, 1995 (age 31); Harrisburg, Pennsylvania, U.S.
- Coaching career

Playing career
- 2013–2015: Penn State
- 2016–2017: UMass
- Position: Tight end

Coaching career (HC unless noted)
- 2020: Arizona State (GA/TE)
- 2021–2022: Arizona State (TE)

Accomplishments and honors

Awards
- 2× 2nd-team All-American (2016, 2017); Freshman All-American (2013)

YouTube information
- Channels: Next Up; Adam Breneman
- Years active: 2022–present
- Genres: Sports; Interviews
- Subscribers: 32.3K (Next Up); 9.87K (Adam Breneman)
- Last updated: April 14, 2024

Adam Alexander Breneman (born March 31, 1995) is an American football media personality, former coach, and player. Most recently, he was the tight ends coach for Arizona State where he was the youngest assistant coach among the power five conferences in college football. Breneman played as a tight end, finishing his playing career as an All-American at UMass after transferring from Penn State. He was a highly touted recruit out of Cedar Cliff High School in Camp Hill, Pennsylvania, rated as the top tight end in his recruiting class by some recruiting services.

Currently, Breneman is a television broadcaster and analyst for CBS Sports. He is the host of his "Next Up Podcast," where he interviews prominent college football head coaches. Breneman is also the co-founder of The College Sports Company, a venture-backed sports media and NIL company that has raised over $5 million. In addition to his broadcasting and entrepreneurial pursuits, Breneman is a successful creator, amassing a following of over 500,000 across social media platforms.

As a true freshman in 2013, Breneman had a breakout season and was named as a 247Sports.com True Freshman All-American. After redshirting due to an injury, Breneman battled injuries in 2015 and appeared in just two games. He officially left Penn State in December 2015 after completing his degree and started working for a media consulting company in Pennsylvania.

In the summer of 2016, after five months away from football, Breneman transferred to the University of Massachusetts Amherst for his final two years of eligibility. A major factor for his un-retirement was a trusted friend and high school quarterback, Andrew Ford. Breneman later credited Ford with "changing his life" in a 2021 interview with Sports Illustrated. During the 2016 and 2017 seasons, Breneman led the country in receiving by a tight end and was named an All-American. In March 2018, he announced his retirement from football due to the knee injury he had first suffered at Penn State.

After his retirement from playing, Breneman worked as a media consultant in Pennsylvania and as a college football commentator and podcast host. In 2020, Breneman got into coaching and was hired by Herm Edwards as a graduate assistant at Arizona State University. In January 2021, just ten months after joining the Arizona State staff, he was promoted to tight ends coach. 247Sports named Adam to their annual "College football's rising stars: The 30Under30 for 2020" list which recognizes the top young coaches in football. Breneman was placed on administrative leave in July 2021, pending the NCAA investigation into alleged recruiting violations. In January 2022, Breneman resigned from his position as tight ends coach for Arizona State Football, according to a report from 247Sports.

== High school career ==
Breneman attended Cedar Cliff High School in Camp Hill, Pennsylvania. At Cedar Cliff, he was ranked as the best tight end recruit in the country by ESPN and was rated a five-star recruit by Scout.com. He received scholarship offers from more than 30 schools before committing to play college football at Pennsylvania State University.

Breneman's younger brother, Grant, went on to become the quarterback for the Cedar Cliff Colts, starting as a sophomore in the 2014-2015 school year, until his graduation in 2017.

Breneman is the all-time leader in receiving by a tight end in Pennsylvania Interscholastic Athletic Association history. He is also the all-time leading receiver in Cedar Cliff history, holding the school records for career yards, receptions, and receiving touchdowns, as well as every single-season receiving record. In his three seasons of varsity football at Cedar Cliff, he totaled 144 receptions, 2,244 yards, and 23 touchdowns.

College recruiting
| Name | Hometown | School | Height | Weight | 40^{‡} | Commit date |
|---|---|---|---|---|---|---|
| Adam Breneman; Tight end | Mechanicsburg, PA | Cedar Cliff High School | 6 ft 4 in (1.93 m) | 230 lb (100 kg) | 4.65 | Mar 9, 2012 |
| Adam Breneman; Tight end | Recruit ratings: Scout: Rivals: 247Sports: ESPN: | | | | | |
Overall recruit ranking: Scout: 2 (TE) Rivals: 3 (TE) 247Sports: 2 (TE) ESPN: 1 (TE)
Note: In many cases, Scout, Rivals, 247Sports, On3, and ESPN may conflict in their listings of height and weight.; In these cases, the average was taken. ESPN grades are on a 100-point scale.; Sources: "2013 Team Ranking". Rivals.com.

== College career ==
=== Penn State ===
==== 2013 season ====
Breneman enrolled early at Penn State in the spring of 2013 after graduating high school a semester early. During his true freshman season, he appeared in 11 games, earning the starting tight end job for the second half of the season. Breneman finished the season with 15 receptions for 186 yards and 3 touchdowns, earning him Freshman All-America honors. His biggest game of the season came in the season finale against the Wisconsin Badgers, where he caught 3 passes for 78 yards, including a 68-yard touchdown in the first quarter. His 68-yard touchdown is the longest touchdown by a tight end in Penn State football history.

==== 2014 season ====
In August 2014, Penn State announced that Breneman would miss the season with a knee injury.

==== 2015 season ====
Prior to the 2015 season, Penn State strength and conditioning coach told the media that Breneman was in top shape following his knee injury. He stated that Breneman ran a 4.62 40-yard dash in July, which would have been one of the best times by a tight end at the 2015 NFL Scouting Combine. However, Adam battled injuries throughout the 2015 season, appearing in only two games. Breneman played against the Ohio State Buckeyes, and was the starting tight end against the Michigan State Spartans.

=== UMass ===
==== 2016 season ====
During the summer of 2016, news broke that Breneman would transfer to the University of Massachusetts Amherst. During the 2016 season, Breneman was the best-producing tight end in all of college football, leading the nation in receptions by a tight end. Breneman was named a John Mackey Award semi-finalist, the New England Player of the Year and a Campus Insiders All-American, among other awards. After contemplating declaring for the 2017 NFL draft following his junior season, Breneman decided to stay in school for his final season.

==== 2017 season ====
During the 2017 season, Breneman once again led the country in receptions by a tight end. Despite missing a game with a minor ankle injury, Breneman finished the year with 64 receptions, 764 yards, and four touchdowns. He was once again a John Mackey Award semi-finalist and a second-team All-American selection by various selectors. Following the season, he was considered one of the top tight end prospects in the 2018 NFL draft.

Breneman finished his college football career with 149 receptions, 1,758 yards, and 15 touchdowns. Despite just two seasons playing for the UMass Minutemen, he finished his career as the all-time leader in receiving by a tight end in school history. After his senior season ended, Breneman signed with Octagon Sports for his professional representation. His agent was Casey Muir.

=== Retirement ===
On March 13, 2018, Breneman released a letter on the blog site medium officially announcing his retirement from football due to a knee injury. In the letter, Breneman wrote: "After additional medical evaluations and creative treatments, my doctors and I have come to the realization that there is no solution that will allow me to continue to play football. It hurts me to share that at just 22 years old, I am officially retiring from the game of football. Football has given me so much in my life and I am very proud of all my accomplishments both on and off the field".

=== College statistics ===
| Year | Team | GP | Receiving | | | |
| Year | Team | GP | Rec | Yds | Avg | TD |
|---|---|---|---|---|---|---|
| 2013 | Penn State | 8 | 15 | 186 | 12.4 | 3 |
| 2014 | Penn State | Did not play due to injury | | | | |
| 2015 | Penn State | 2 | 0 | 0 | 0.0 | 0 |
| 2016 | UMass | 12 | 70 | 808 | 11.5 | 8 |
| 2017 | UMass | 11 | 64 | 764 | 11.9 | 4 |
| Career | | 33 | 149 | 1,758 | 11.8 | 15 |

== Broadcasting career ==
Breneman launched a broadcasting and media career in 2018. Beginning in September of the same year, Breneman began hosting his own weekly Penn State Football show on Pennlive.com, the website for the popular newspaper The Patriot-News. On his show, Breneman and Patriot-News Penn State beat writer Bob Flounders analyze the Penn State football team. Breneman was the color commentator for the 2019 Big 33 Football Classic all-star game which aired on Stadium Network. He has also commentated on college football games produced by FloSports and ESPN+.

In July 2019, CBS Sports Radio announced that Adam will be hosting a sports talk show during the fall. The show features analysis on Penn State Football and air live on WHGB in Harrisburg, Pennsylvania. In 2019, Adam launched a podcast titled "Next Up with Adam Breneman." On it, he interviews college and NFL football players about overcoming adversity and their careers. As of November 2023, the podcast has grown to have 27.7 thousand subscribers on YouTube.

== Coaching career ==
=== Arizona State ===
In February 2020, 247Sports first reported that Breneman would be getting into the football coaching industry and joining Herm Edwards' coaching staff at Arizona State University. He served as an offensive assistant at Arizona State for the 2020 season. After one season, Breneman was promoted to the full-time staff as the tight ends coach.

In 2020, 247Sports named Adam to their annual "College Football's Rising Stars: The 30Under30 for 2020" list which recognizes the top young coaches in football.

In July 2021, Breneman was placed on administrative leave along with three other assistant coaches based on allegations of recruiting violations. On January 27, 2022, he resigned from Arizona State to pursue other endeavors.

== Personal life and family ==
Breneman was born in Harrisburg, Pennsylvania, the oldest of three children from parents Brian and Sherri. His father played football at Delaware Valley College, where he was an NCAA Division III All-American tight end. Breneman's younger brother, Grant, played quarterback at Colgate and was a finalist for the Jerry Rice Award in 2017. His younger sister, Julia, was adopted from Guatemala and starred on the field hockey team at Saint Francis University.

=== Philanthropy ===
During his senior year of high school, Breneman started Catch The Cure, a fundraiser to raise awareness and money to fight Amyotrophic lateral sclerosis, or Lou Gehrig's disease. Catch The Cure raised over $200,000 for A.L.S. research, with all funds benefiting New York based research organization Project ALS

Breneman served as the Vice President and a member of the board for the Penn State football chapter of Uplifting Athletes during his career at Penn State.

In 2017, Breneman was named a finalist for the Jason Witten Man of the Year Award. This award is "presented annually to the Division I college football player who has demonstrated a record of leadership by exhibiting exceptional courage, integrity and sportsmanship both on and off the field."

In 2019, Breneman joined the board of directors of The Peyton Walker Foundation, a Pennsylvania-based organization which provides free heart screenings for youth in order to prevent sudden cardiac arrest.

Breneman also serves on the Board of Directors of Project ALS.

=== Other endeavours ===
After graduating from Penn State's Smeal College of Business in December 2015, Breneman was hired by Mike Regan to serve as his campaign manager for his 2016 Pennsylvania Senate run. In April 2016, Regan won the primary election for Pennsylvania Senate, District 31 with over 52% of the vote in a four-person race. After the victory, Regan offered Breneman the job of his chief of staff. Breneman briefly accepted, but then instead opted to return to football at the University of Massachusetts and pursue his MBA.
