= Matt Brock (American football coach) =

American football coach (born 1988)

Current position
- Title: Co-defensive coordinator and linebackers coach
- Team: Mississippi State
- Conference: SEC

Biographical details
- Born: October 11, 1988 (age 37); Holton, Kansas, U.S.

Playing career
- 2007–2010: Baker
- Position: Linebacker

Coaching career (HC unless noted)
- 2011–2012: Baker (GA)
- 2013: Texas Tech (DQC)
- 2014–2015: Texas Tech (ILB)
- 2016–2017: Bowling Green (STC/LB)
- 2018–2019: Washington State (STC/OLB)
- 2020–2021: Mississippi State (STC/OLB)
- 2022: Mississippi State (LB)
- 2023: Mississippi State (DC/LB)
- 2024–2025: UConn (DC)
- 2026–present: Mississippi State (co-DC/LB)

Matt Brock (born October 11, 1988) is an American college football coach who is the co-defensive coordinator and linebackers for the Mississippi State Bulldogs.

== Playing career ==
Brock played for four years at Baker, in those four years he tallied 277 tackles, and seven interceptions, while being an all conference selection in 2009 and 2010.

== Coaching career ==
Brock started his coaching career at Baker University as a graduate assistant for two years. He then went to Texas Tech as a defensive quality control coach for one year. Following the 2013 season, Brock was promoted to coach the inside linebackers. After coaching at Texas Tech for a total of three years, Brock went to Bowling Green as their special teams and linebackers coach. During the 2017 season with Bowling Green, Brock was named a nominee for the Broyles Award, which is given to the top assistant coach in the country. After his two-year stint with Bowling Green, Brock headed to Washington State to coach their special teams, and outside linebackers. Brock was hired by Mississippi State in 2020 to coach their special teams, and outside linebackers, which were the same positions he held at Washington State. After three years at Mississippi State, Brock was promoted to be the defensive coordinator in 2023. After head coach Zach Arnett was fired by Mississippi State, Brock was not retained by the school after the 2023 season. Brock subsequently was hired to be the defensive coordinator at Connecticut. After two years with the Huskies, Brock was rehired by Mississippi State for a second stint as defensive coordinator.
