= Project ALS =

American organization aiding ALS research

- Founded: 1998
- Founder: Jenifer Estess; Valerie Estess; Meredith Estess; Julianne Hoffeberg
- Type: Non-profit
- Purpose: "to identify and support a treatment and cure for ALS"
- Location: New York City, U.S.
- Key people: Meredith Estess, President; Robert S. Kaplan, Chairman
- Website: projectals.org

Project ALS is a non-profit organization whose mission is to identify and support leading scientific research toward the first effective treatments and a cure for ALS. Founded in 1998 by Jenifer Estess, Valerie Estess, Meredith Estess, and Julianne Hoffenberg, Project ALS recruits scientists and doctors to work together toward a better understanding of ALS and other closely related neuro-degenerative diseases.

== History ==
Project ALS was founded in 1998 as a non-profit organization when Jenifer Estess, a 35-year-old New York theater and film producer, was diagnosed with ALS. Historically, scientists working separately on various aspects of the disease conducted ALS research. Project ALS changed that approach by requiring that researchers and doctors work together, share data openly, and meet research milestones.

Project ALS's Research Advisory Board (RAB) brings together accomplished scientists to seek out the most promising research and set the agenda for the entire research field.

== Celebrity involvement ==
The following people and groups have been involved with Project ALS:

- Julianna Margulies
- Anne Meara
- Caroline Rhea
- Debora Spar
- Thomas Jessel
- Northport High School
- Donna Hanover
- Edie Falco
- Ben Stiller
