= Wasabi Technologies =

American object storage service provider

Wasabi Technologies, Inc.
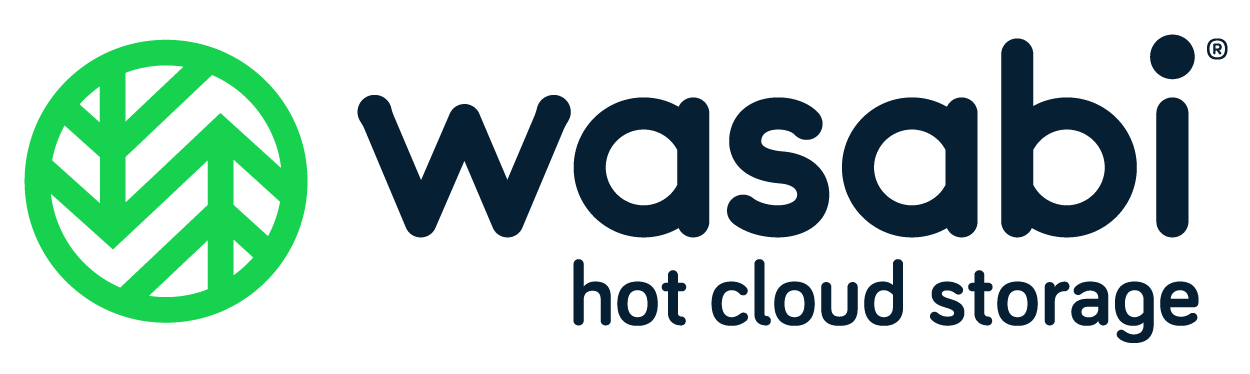
- Formerly: Blue Archive
- Type: Private
- Industry: Cloud storage software
- Founded: June 1, 2017; 9 years ago in Boston, Massachusetts, United States
- Founder: David Friend; Jeff Flowers
- Headquarters: Boston, Massachusetts, U.S.
- Area served: Worldwide
- Key people: David Friend (CEO); Jeff Flowers (CTO)
- Products: Wasabi Hot Storage
- Website: wasabi.com

Wasabi Technologies, Inc. is an American object storage service provider based in Boston, Massachusetts that sells cloud storage. The company was co-founded in September 2015 by David Friend and Jeff Flowers and launched its cloud storage product in May 2017.

== History ==
Wasabi founders, David Friend and Jeff Flowers, were previously co-founders of Carbonite, an online backup service, as well as several other companies. Friend’s first venture, ARP Instruments, developed synthesizers used by artists including Stevie Wonder, David Bowie, and Led Zeppelin. He later founded Computer Pictures Corporation, Pilot Software, Faxnet, and Sonexis.

The company was initially called "BlueArchive" at its founding, but was later renamed to "Wasabi Technologies, Inc." after the Japanese horseradish. Wasabi's core offering is its "hot" file storage that is fully compatible with the Amazon S3 API.

Wasabi Technologies, Inc. was launched with a single data center location in Ashburn, Virginia. The company has since grown to have 16 storage regions and serving customers in more than 100 countries as of 2025.

In November 2021, Wasabi Technologies became the title sponsor of the Fenway Bowl, an annual college football bowl game played at Fenway Park in Boston. The sponsorship covers a multi-year agreement and includes the establishment of an executive committee composed of regional business, education, and non-profit leaders charged with advancing the game’s educational and community-oriented mission.

Wasabi reached unicorn status in September 2022, following a $250 million financing round that valued the company at approximately $1.1 billion.

In January 2026, the company announced it had raised $70 million in a funding round led by L2 Point Management. The funding will allow for increased AI storage, a new storage class the company started in late 2025. This was followed by securing a $250 million credit facility in April 2026, and launching a dedicated AI business division in September 2026.
