= Skyler Bell =

American football player (born 2002)

No. 13 – Buffalo Bills
- Position: Wide receiver
- Roster status: Active

Personal information
- Born: July 5, 2002 (age 24); The Bronx, New York, U.S.
- Listed height: 6 ft 0 in (1.83 m)
- Listed weight: 192 lb (87 kg)

Career information
- High school: Taft (Watertown, Connecticut)
- College: Wisconsin (2021–2023); UConn (2024–2025)
- NFL draft: 2026: 4th round, 125th overall pick

Career history
- Buffalo Bills (2026–present)

Awards and highlights
- Consensus All-American (2025)
- Stats at Pro Football Reference

Skyler Bell (born July 5, 2002) is an American professional football wide receiver for the Buffalo Bills of the National Football League (NFL). He played college football for the Wisconsin Badgers and UConn Huskies and was selected by the Bills in the fourth round of the 2026 NFL draft.

== Early life ==
Bell attended the Taft School in Watertown, Connecticut. Coming out of high school, he was rated as a three-star recruit and committed to play college football for the Wisconsin Badgers over Iowa, Rutgers, Virginia Tech, and West Virginia.

== College career ==
=== Wisconsin ===
As a freshman in 2021, Bell played just one game, where he made one catch for 15 yards. In 2022, he hauled in 30 receptions for 444 yards and five touchdowns, while also adding 160 yards on the ground on five carries. In 2023 Bell notched 38 receptions for 296 yards and a touchdown. After the season, he entered his name into the NCAA transfer portal.

=== UConn ===
Bell transferred to play for the UConn Huskies. In week 5 of the 2024 season, he hauled in six receptions for 153 yards and three touchdowns in a 47-3 win over Buffalo. In 2025 he totaled 101 receptions for 1,278 yards, and was named a consensus All-American along with being a finalist for the Biletnikoff Award.

=== Statistics ===
Year	Team	GP	Receiving			
Year	Team	GP	Rec	Yds	Avg	TD
2021	Wisconsin	1	1	15	15.0	0
2022	Wisconsin	13	30	444	14.8	5
2023	Wisconsin	12	38	296	7.8	1
2024	UConn	13	50	860	17.2	5
2025	UConn	13	101	1,278	12.7	13
Career		52	220	2,893	13.2	24

== Professional career ==
Pre-draft measurables
Height	Weight	Arm length	Hand span	Wingspan	40-yard dash	10-yard split	20-yard split	20-yard shuttle	Three-cone drill	Vertical jump	Broad jump
5 ft 11 5/8 in (1.82 m)	192 lb (87 kg)	31 1/8 in (0.79 m)	10 in (0.25 m)	6 ft 4 3/4 in (1.95 m)	4.40 s	1.53 s	2.55 s	4.11 s	6.65 s	41.0 in (1.04 m)	11 ft 1 in (3.38 m)
All values from NFL Combine/Pro Day

Bell was selected by the Buffalo Bills with the 125th pick in the fourth round of the 2026 NFL draft. The selection was received from the New England Patriots along with the 31st overall pick (traded to the Tennessee Titans) in exchange for the 28th overall pick (the Patriots selected Caleb Lomu).
