= Pryce Yates =

American football player

No. 10 – North Carolina Tar Heels
- Position: Defensive lineman
- Class: Redshirt Senior

Personal information
- Listed height: 6 ft 4 in (1.93 m)
- Listed weight: 265 lb (120 kg)

Career information
- High school: Ronald Reagan (San Antonio, Texas)
- College: UConn (2021–2024); North Carolina (2025–present)
- Stats at ESPN

Pryce Yates is an American college football defensive lineman for the North Carolina Tar Heels. He previously played for the UConn Huskies.

== Early life ==
Yates attended Ronald Reagan High School in San Antonio, Texas. He was rated as a three-star recruit, the 182nd overall edge rusher, and the 1,820th overall player in the class of 2021. Ultimately, Yates committed to play college football for the UConn Huskies.

== College career ==
=== UConn ===
As a freshman in 2021, Yates took a redshirt. In 2022, he played in 13 games, recording 45 tackles with nine being for a loss and four and a half sacks. In week 13 of the 2023 season, Yates recorded six tackles and a sack in a victory versus Sacred Heart. He finished the 2023 season with 42 tackles with 14 going for a loss and four and a half sacks in 12 games. In the 2024 Fenway Bowl, Yates was named the bowl's MVP after totaling six tackles with three going for a loss, and a sack in a win over North Carolina. During the 2024 season, he appeared in just seven games due to injury, where he notched 21 tackles with six and a half being for a loss and three and a half sacks. After the season, Yates entered his name into the NCAA transfer portal.

=== North Carolina ===
Yates transferred to play for the North Carolina Tar Heels. He navigated injury issues in his lone season with North Carolina, and left the team mid-season.
