= 2024 Wake Forest Demon Deacons football team =

American college football season

2024 Wake Forest Demon Deacons football
- Conference: Atlantic Coast Conference
- Record: 4–8 (2–6 ACC)
- Head coach: Dave Clawson (11th season)
- Offensive coordinator: Warren Ruggiero (11th season)
- Offensive scheme: Slow mesh
- Defensive coordinator: Brad Lambert (6th season)
- Base defense: Multiple 4–2–5
- Home stadium: Allegacy Federal Credit Union Stadium

2024 Atlantic Coast Conference football standings
	Conf.			Overall
Team	W		L	W		L
No. 12 SMU y^	8	–	0	11	–	3
No. 14 Clemson y$^	7	–	1	10	–	4
No. 18 Miami (FL)	6	–	2	10	–	3
No. 20 Syracuse	5	–	3	10	–	3
Duke	5	–	3	9	–	4
Louisville	5	–	3	9	–	4
Georgia Tech	5	–	3	7	–	6
Boston College	4	–	4	7	–	6
Virginia Tech	4	–	4	6	–	7
Pittsburgh	3	–	5	7	–	6
NC State	3	–	5	6	–	7
North Carolina	3	–	5	6	–	7
Virginia	3	–	5	5	–	7
California	2	–	6	6	–	7
Wake Forest	2	–	6	4	–	8
Stanford	2	–	6	3	–	9
Florida State	1	–	7	2	–	10
Championship: Clemson 34, SMU 31
^ – College Football Playoff participant; $ – Conference champion; y – Championship game participant; Rankings from AP Poll

The 2024 Wake Forest Demon Deacons football team represented Wake Forest University in the Atlantic Coast Conference (ACC) during the 2024 NCAA Division I FBS football season. The Demon Deacons were led by Dave Clawson in his eleventh and final year as the head coach. The Demon Deacons played their home games at Allegacy Federal Credit Union Stadium located in Winston-Salem, North Carolina.

On December 16, Clawson announced he would be stepping down as the Demon Deacons' coach and move into an advisory role. Two days later, December 18, Washington State head coach Jake Dickert was announced as the program's new head coach.

== Offseason ==
=== Players drafted into the NFL ===
Round	Pick	Player	Position	Team
4	124	Malik Mustapha	S	San Francisco 49ers
5	174	Caelen Carson	CB	Dallas Cowboys
7	230	Michael Jurgens	C	Minnesota Vikings

=== Transfers ===
==== Outgoing ====
Player	Position	Destination
Jacob Zuhr	LS	Syracuse
Brendon Harris	S	Middle Tennessee
Trey Boll	TE	TBD
Mitch Griffis	QB	Marshall
Christian Forbes	IOL	Howard
Jaylen Hudson	EDGE	UMass
AJ Williams	S	Coastal Carolina
Santino Marucci	RB	New Mexico State
Wesley Grimes	WR	NC State
Eli Hall	DL	Liberty
Brooks Yurachek	LB	Arkansas
AK Kelly	WR	TBD
Justice Ellison	RB	Indiana
Ke'Shawn Williams	WR	Indiana
Jahmal Banks	WR	Nebraska
DaShawn Jones	CB	Alabama

==== Incoming ====
Player	Position	Previous school
Keagen Trost	OT	Indiana State
Hank Bachmeier	QB	Louisiana Tech
Mateen Ibirogba	EDGE	Georgetown
Capone Blue	CB	Kent State
Branson Combs	LB	Southern Illinois
Cdarius Kelly	CB	Lenoir–Rhyne

== Schedule ==
Date	Time	Opponent	Site	TV	Result	Attendance
August 29	7:00 p.m.	North Carolina A&T*	Allegacy Federal Credit Union Stadium; Winston-Salem, NC	ACCNX/ESPN+	W 45–13	29,450
September 7	7:00 p.m.	Virginia	Allegacy Federal Credit Union Stadium; Winston-Salem, NC	ESPN2	L 30–31	30,012
September 14	6:30 p.m.	No. 5 Ole Miss*^{†}	Allegacy Federal Credit Union Stadium; Winston-Salem, NC	The CW	L 6–40	32,849
September 28	3:30 p.m.	Louisiana*	Allegacy Federal Credit Union Stadium; Winston-Salem, NC	ACCN	L 38–41	31,061
October 5	12:00 p.m.	at NC State	Carter–Finley Stadium; Raleigh, NC (rivalry)	The CW	W 34–30	56,919
October 12	12:00 p.m.	No. 10 Clemson	Allegacy Federal Credit Union Stadium; Winston-Salem, NC	ESPN	L 14–49	31,553
October 19	12:00 p.m.	at UConn*	Rentschler Field; East Hartford, CT	CBSSN	W 23–20	30,122
October 26	3:30 p.m.	at Stanford	Stanford Stadium; Stanford, CA	ACCN	W 27–24	23,471
November 8	8:00 p.m.	California	Allegacy Federal Credit Union Stadium; Winston-Salem, NC	ACCN	L 36–46	28,455
November 16	8:00 p.m.	at North Carolina	Kenan Memorial Stadium; Chapel Hill, NC (rivalry)	ACCN	L 24–31	48,364
November 23	12:00 p.m.	at No. 8 Miami (FL)	Hard Rock Stadium; Miami Gardens, FL	ESPN	L 14–42	64,210
November 30	12:00 p.m.	Duke	Allegacy Federal Credit Union Stadium; Winston-Salem, NC (rivalry)	ACCN	L 17–23	24,776
*Non-conference game; ^{†}Homecoming; Rankings from AP Poll - Released prior to game; All times are in Eastern time

== Game summaries ==
=== vs. North Carolina A&T (FCS) ===
Game One – North Carolina A&T Aggies (FCS) (0-0) at Wake Forest Demon Deacons (0-0) – Game summary

Quarter	1	2	3	4	Total
Aggies (FCS)	7	3	0	3	13
Demon Deacons	7	10	21	7	45

at Allegacy Federal Credit Union Stadium, Winston-Salem, NC

- Date: Thursday August 29, 2024
- Game time: 7:00 PM
- Game attendance: 29,450
- Referee: Stuart Mullins
- TV announcers (ACCNX): Matt Schick (play-by-play) and Charles Arbuckle (analyst)

Game information

First quarter

- (11:25) WAKE – Demond Claiborne 7-yard run (Matthew Dennis kick) (Drive: 5 plays, 55 yards, 1:29; Wake Forest 7-0)
- (2:29) NCAT – Kenji Christian 21-yard run (Andrew Brown kick) (Drive: 11 plays, 80 yards, 5:17; Tied 7-7)

Second quarter

- (6:49) NCAT – Andrew Brown 38-yard field goal (Drive: 15 plays, 71 yards, 8:32; North Carolina A&T 10-7)
- (5:00) WAKE – Donavon Greene 24-yard pass from Hank Bachmeier (Matthew Dennis kick) (Drive: 5 plays, 75 yards, 1:49; Wake Forest 14-10)
- (0:02) WAKE – Matthew Dennis 31-yard field goal (Drive: 14 plays, 72 yards, 2:46; Wake Forest 17-10)

Third quarter

- (12:54) WAKE – Taylor Morin 73-yard punt return (Matthew Dennis kick) (Wake Forest 24-10)
- (6:15) WAKE – Horatio Fields 5-yard pass from Hank Bachmeier (Matthew Dennis kick) (Drive: 7 plays, 88 yards, 2:39; Wake Forest 31-10)
- (0:13) WAKE – Deuce Alexander 4-yard pass from Hank Bachmeier (Matthew Dennis kick) (Drive: 9 plays, 90 yards, 2:35; Wake Forest 38-10)

Fourth quarter

- (11:05) NCAT – Andrew Brown 51-yard field goal (Drive: 8 plays, 42 yards, 4:08; Wake Forest 38-13)
- (5:37) WAKE – Tate Carney 2-yard run (Matthew Dennis kick) (Drive: 12 plays, 62 yards, 5:22; Wake Forest 45-13)

Statistics	NCAT	WAKE
First downs	22	26
Total yards	69–337	68–513
Rushing yards	44–185	32–193
Passing yards	152	320
Passing: Comp–Att–Int	15–25–0	23–36–0
Time of possession	36:21	23:39

Team	Category	Player	Statistics
North Carolina A&T	Passing	Kevin White	10/15, 116 yards
North Carolina A&T	Rushing	Kenji Christian	16 carries, 121 yards, TD
North Carolina A&T	Receiving	Ger-Cari Caldwell	5 receptions, 51 yards
Wake Forest	Passing	Hank Bachmeier	18/28, 263 yards, 3 TD
Wake Forest	Rushing	Demond Claiborne	17 carries, 135 yards, TD
Wake Forest	Receiving	Taylor Morin	6 receptions, 100 yards

=== vs. Virginia ===
Game Two – Virginia Cavaliers (1–0) vs Wake Forest Demon Deacons (1–0) – Game summary

Quarter	1	2	3	4	Total
Cavaliers	0	0	0	0	0
Demon Deacons	0	0	0	0	0

at Allegacy Federal Credit Union Stadium, Winston-Salem, North Carolina

- Date: Saturday September 7, 2024
- Game time: 7:00 PM
- TV announcers (ESPN2): Mike Monaco (play-by-play), Kirk Morrison (analyst), and Dawn Davenport (sideline)

Game information

First quarter

- (11:37) WF – Demond Claiborne 17-yard run, Matthew Dennis kick (Drive: 5 plays, 71 yards, 1:51; Wake Forest 7–0)
- (5:39) UVA – Will Bettridge 19-yard field goal (Drive: 6 plays, 68 yards, 3:06; Wake Forest 7–3)
- (2:27) WF – Matthew Dennis 21-yard field goal (Drive: 9 plays, 62 yards, 3:12; Wake Forest 10–3)

Second quarter

- (13:01) WF – Demond Claiborne 2-yard run, Matthew Dennis kick (Drive: 2 plays, 9 yards, 0:38; Wake Forest 17–3)
- (10:05) UVA – Tyler Neville 18-yard pass from Anthony Colandrea, Will Bettridge kick (Drive: 8 plays, 68 yards, 2:51; Wake Forest 17–10)
- (7:17) WF – Matthew Dennis 38-yard field goal (Drive: 8 plays, 55 yards, 2:48; Wake Forest 20–10)
- (4:26) UVA – Tyler Neville 24-yard pass from Anthony Colandrea, Will Bettridge kick (Drive: 8 plays, 75 yards, 2:44; Wake Forest 20–17)

Third quarter

- (7:40) WF – Donavon Greene 3-yard pass from Hank Bachmeier, Matthew Dennis kick (Drive: 14 plays, 75 yards, 7:20; Wake Forest 27–17)
- (2:10) WF – Matthew Dennis 26-yard field goal (Drive: 10 plays, 69 yards, 3:43; Wake Forest 30–17)

Fourth quarter

- (10:37) UVA – Trell Harris 24-yard pass from Anthony Colandrea, Will Bettridge kick (Drive: 7 plays, 66 yards, 2:49; Wake Forest 30–24)
- (2:07) UVA – Grady Brosterhous 1-yard run, Will Bettridge kick (Drive: 12 plays, 56 yards, 5:13; Virginia 31–30)

Statistics	UVA	WAKE
First downs	23	25
Total yards	430	544
Rushing yards	73	141
Passing yards	357	403
Passing: Comp–Att–Int	33–43–2	27–43–0
Time of possession	27:50	32:10

Team	Category	Player	Statistics
Virginia	Passing	Anthony Colandrea	33–43, 357 yards, 3 TD, 2 INT
Virginia	Rushing	Xavier Brown	9 carries, 35 yards
Virginia	Receiving	Malachi Fields	11 receptions, 148 yards
Wake Forest	Passing	Hank Bachmeier	27–42, 403 yards, 1 TD
Wake Forest	Rushing	Demond Claiborne	21 carries, 86 yards, 2 TD
Wake Forest	Receiving	Donavon Greene	11 receptions, 166 yards, 1 TD

=== vs. No. 5 Ole Miss ===
Game Three – No. 5 Ole Miss Rebels (2–0) vs Wake Forest Demon Deacons (1–1) – Game summary

Quarter	1	2	3	4	Total
No. 5 Rebels	20	3	7	10	40
Demon Deacons	3	3	0	0	6

at Allegacy Federal Credit Union Stadium, Winston-Salem, North Carolina

- Date: Saturday September 14, 2024
- Game time: 6:30 PM
- Game weather: Sunny, 77 °F (25 °C)
- Game attendance: 32,849
- Referee: Adam Savoie
- TV announcers (The CW): Thom Brennaman (play-by-play), Max Browne (analyst), and Treavor Scales (sideline)

Game information

First quarter

- (13:37) Ole Miss - Henry Parrish Jr. 25 Yd Run (Caden Davis Kick) (Drive: 5 plays, 75 yards, 1:23; Ole Miss 7–0)
- (5:22) Wake Forest - Matthew Dennis 42 Yd Field Goal (Drive: 8 plays, 55 yards, 2:36; Ole Miss 7–3)
- (4:48) Ole Miss - Jordan Watkins 75 Yd pass from Jaxson Dart (Caden Davis Kick) (Drive: 2 plays, 75 yards, 0:34; Ole Miss 14–3)
- (1:55) Ole Miss - Henry Parrish Jr. 22 Yd Run (Caden Davis PAT failed) (Drive: 7 plays, 63 yards, 1:56; Ole Miss 20–3)

Second quarter

- (4:44) Ole Miss - Caden Davis 33 Yd Field Goal (Drive: 16 plays, 71 yards, 6:17; Ole Miss 23–3)
- (0:13) Wake Forest - Matthew Dennis 37 Yd Field Goal (Drive: 13 plays, 56 yards, 4:31; Ole Miss 23–6)

Third quarter

- (3:39) Ole Miss - Jaxson Dart 13 Yd Run (Caden Davis Kick) (Drive: 11 plays, 96 yards, 4:49; Ole Miss 30–6)

Fourth quarter

- (8:02) Ole Miss - Caden Davis 26 Yd Field Goal (Drive: 13 plays, 76 yards, 5:53; Ole Miss 33–6)
- (6:27) Ole Miss - Antwane Wells Jr. 31 Yd pass from Jaxson Dart (Caden Davis Kick) (Drive: 3 plays, 44 yards, 0:59; Ole Miss 40–6)

Statistics	MISS	WAKE
First downs	33	21
Total yards	650	311
Rushing yards	273	46
Passing yards	377	265
Passing: Comp–Att–Int	26–34–1	24–42–1
Time of possession	30:39	29:21

Team	Category	Player	Statistics
Ole Miss	Passing	Jaxson Dart	26/34, 377 yards, 2 TD, INT
Ole Miss	Rushing	Henry Parrish Jr.	23 carries, 148 yards, 2 TD
Ole Miss	Receiving	Tre Harris	11 receptions, 127 yards
Wake Forest	Passing	Hank Bachmeier	22/39, 239 yards
Wake Forest	Rushing	Ty Clark III	8 carries, 41 yards
Wake Forest	Receiving	Taylor Morin	5 receptions, 77 yards

=== vs. Louisiana ===
Game Four – Louisiana Ragin' Cajuns (2–1) vs Wake Forest Demon Deacons (1–2) – Game summary

Quarter	1	2	3	4	Total
Ragin' Cajuns	14	7	10	10	41
Demon Deacons	3	14	14	7	38

at Allegacy Federal Credit Union Stadium, Winston-Salem, North Carolina

- Date: Saturday September 28, 2024
- Game time: 3:30 PM
- Game weather: Cloudy • Temperature: 77 °F (25 °C) • Wind: SW at 9 miles per hour (14 km/h)
- Game attendance: 31,061
- Referee: Nate Black
- TV announcers (ACCN): Chris Cotter (play-by-play), Rocky Boiman (analyst), and Coley Harvey (sideline)

Game information

First quarter

- (7:56) ULL – Tavion Smith 2-yard pass from Ben Wooldridge, Kenneth Almendares kick (Drive: 10 plays, 70 yards, 5:54; Louisiana 7–0)
- (2:31) WAKE – Matthew Dennis 39-yard field goal (Drive: 13 plays, 54 yards, 5:25; Louisiana 7–3)
- (0:56) ULL – Ben Wooldridge 1-yard run, Kenneth Almendares kick (Drive: 4 plays, 75 yards, 1:35; Louisiana 14–3)

Second quarter

- (4:28) WAKE – Tate Carney 1-yard run, Matthew Dennis kick (Drive: 10 plays, 65 yards, 5:28; Louisiana 14–10)
- (1:18) ULL – Lance LeGendre 20-yard pass from Ben Wooldridge, Kenneth Almendares kick (Drive: 8 plays, 75 yards, 3:10; Louisiana 21–10)
- (0:15) WAKE – Deuce Alexander 3-yard pass from Hank Bachmeier, Matthew Dennis kick (Drive: 6 plays, 80 yards, 0:57; Louisiana 21–17)

Third quarter

- (10:22) ULL – Kenneth Almendares 50-yard field goal (Drive: 11 plays, 42 yards, 4:38; Louisiana 24–17)
- (8:19) WAKE – Demond Claiborne 60-yard run, Matthew Dennis kick (Drive: 5 plays, 82 yards, 1:59; Tied 24–24)
- (6:49) ULL – Lance LeGendre 48-yard pass from Ben Wooldridge, Kenneth Almendares kick (Drive: 4 plays, 75 yards, 1:30; Louisiana 31–24)
- (0:39) WAKE – Tate Carney 1-yard run, Matthew Dennis kick (Drive: 12 plays, 75 yards, 6:10; Tied 31–31)

Fourth quarter

- (8:07) ULL – Bill Davis 2-yard run, Kenneth Almendares kick (Drive: 4 plays, 38 yards, 1:32; Louisiana 38–31)
- (1:55) WAKE – Tate Carney 1-yard run, Matthew Dennis kick (Drive: 13 plays, 80 yards, 6:06; Tied 38–38)
- (0:52) ULL – Kenneth Almendares 31-yard field goal (Drive: 6 plays, 30 yards, 0:55; Louisiana 41–38)

Statistics	ULL	WAKE
First downs	24	28
Total yards	466	472
Rushing yards	209	218
Passing yards	257	254
Passing: Comp–Att–Int	20–29–0	29–36–1
Time of possession	29:01	30:59

Team	Category	Player	Statistics
Louisiana	Passing	Ben Wooldridge	20/29, 257 yards, 3 TD
Louisiana	Rushing	Bill Davis	13 carries, 95 yards, TD
Louisiana	Receiving	Lance LeGendre	6 receptions, 123 yards, 2 TD
Wake Forest	Passing	Hank Bachmeier	29/35, 254 yards, TD, INT
Wake Forest	Rushing	Demond Claiborne	12 carries, 94 yards, TD
Wake Forest	Receiving	Horatio Fields	6 receptions, 81 yards

=== at NC State (rivalry) ===
Game Five – Wake Forest Demon Deacons (1–3) vs NC State Wolfpack (3–2) – Game summary

Quarter	1	2	3	4	Total
Demon Deacons	10	7	3	14	34
Wolfpack	3	13	7	7	30

at Carter–Finley Stadium • Raleigh, North Carolina

- Date: Saturday October 5, 2024
- Game time: 12:00 p.m.
- Game weather: Sunny, 78 °F (26 °C)
- Game attendance: 56,919
- Referee: Tim Hedgepeth
- TV announcers (CW): Thom Brennaman (play-by-play), Max Browne (analyst), and Treavor Scales (sideline)

Game information

First quarter

- WF – Matthew Dennis 31-yard field goal, 11:50. Demon Deacons 3–0. Drive: 9 plays, 62 yards, 3:10.
- WF – Demond Claiborne 3-yard pass from Hank Bachmeier (Matthew Dennis kick), 8:51. Demon Deacons 10–0. Drive: 2 plays, 2 yards, 0:36.
- NCSU – Kanoah Vinesett 35-yard field goal, 3:09. Demon Deacons 10–3. Drive: 11 plays, 57 yards, 5:42.

Second quarter

- NCSU – Keenan Jackson 9-yard pass from CJ Bailey (Kanoah Vinesett kick), 11:30. Tied 10–10. Drive: 12 plays, 55 yards, 5:47.
- NCSU – Kanoah Vinesett 35-yard field goal, 2:58. Wolfpack 13–10. Drive: 13 plays, 61 yards, 7:13.
- WF – Horatio Fields 23-yard pass from Hank Bachmeier (Matthew Dennis kick), 1:28. Demon Deacons 17–13. Drive: 7 plays, 75 yards, 1:30.
- NCSU – Kanoah Vinesett 37-yard field goal, 0:03. Demon Deacons 17–16. Drive: 9 plays, 55 yards, 1:25.

Third quarter

- WF – Matthew Dennis 41-yard field goal, 6:28. Demon Deacons 20–16. Drive: 8 plays, 52 yards, 3:03.
- NCSU – Kendrick Raphael 20-yard run (Kanoah Vinesett kick), 3:02. Wolfpack 23–20. Drive: 7 plays, 75 yards, 3:26.

Fourth quarter

- NCSU – Justin Joly 22-yard pass from C. J. Bailey (Kanoah Vinesett kick), 13:08. Wolfpack 30–20. Drive: 7 plays, 62 yards, 3:51.
- WF – Demond Claiborne 32-yard run (Matthew Dennis kick), 8:43. Wolfpack 30–27. Drive: 9 plays, 75 yards, 4:25.
- WF – Demond Claiborne 3-yard run (Matthew Dennis kick), 1:01. Demon Deacons 34–30. Drive: 13 plays, 65 yards, 6:06.

Statistics	WAKE	NCSU
First downs	21	28
Total yards	315	419
Rushing yards	161	105
Passing yards	154	314
Passing: Comp–Att–Int	16–32–1	31–47–1
Time of possession	24:08	35:52

Team	Category	Player	Statistics
Wake Forest	Passing	Hank Bachmeier	16/32, 154 yards, 2 TD, INT
Wake Forest	Rushing	Demond Claiborne	20 carries, 136 yards, 2 TD
Wake Forest	Receiving	Micah Mays Jr.	4 receptions, 48 yards
NC State	Passing	C. J. Bailey	28/42, 272 yards, 2 TD, INT
NC State	Rushing	Kendrick Raphael	10 carries, 48 yards, TD
NC State	Receiving	Justin Joly	4 receptions, 73 yards, TD

=== vs. No. 10 Clemson ===
Game Six – No. 10 Clemson Tigers (4–1) vs. Wake Forest Demon Deacons (2–3) − Game summary

Quarter	1	2	3	4	Total
No. 10 Tigers	0	28	14	7	49
Demon Deacons	7	7	0	0	14

at Allegacy Federal Credit Union Stadium • Winston-Salem, North Carolina

- Date: October 12, 2024
- Game time: 12:00 p.m.
- Game weather: Temperature: 65 °F (18 °C) • Wind: W 5 mph • Weather: Sunny
- Game attendance: 31,553
- Referee: Jerry Magallanes
- TV announcers (ESPN): Dave Pasch (play-by-play), Dusty Dvoracek (analyst), and Taylor McGregor (sideline)

Game information

First quarter

- (01:32) Wake Forest – Horatio Fields 31-yard pass from Hank Bachmeier, Matthew Dennis kick (Drive: 8 plays, 73 yards, 2:09; Wake Forest 7–0)

Second quarter

- (13:39) Clemson – Antonio Williams 22-yard pass from Cade Klubnik, Nolan Hauser kick (Drive: 8 plays, 75 yards, 2:53; Tied 7–7)
- (12:34) Clemson – Phil Mafah 1-yard run, Hauser kick (Drive: 2 plays, 23 yards, 0:27; Clemson 14–7)
- (06:46) Clemson – Mafah 2-yard run, Hauser kick (Drive: 9 plays, 57 yards, 3:27; Clemson 21–7)
- (03:18) Wake Forest – Michael Frogge 6-yard pass from Bachmeier, Dennis kick (Drive: 8 plays, 75 yards, 3:28; Clemson 21–14)
- (01:31) Clemson – Troy Stellato 8-yard pass from Klubnik, Hauser kick (Drive: 6 plays, 75 yards, 1:47; Clemson 28–14)

Third quarter

- (09:52) Clemson – Adam Randall 9-yard pass from Klubnik, Hauser kick (Drive: 10 plays, 75 yards, 5:08; Clemson 35–14)
- (07:03) Clemson – Jake Briningstool 22-yard pass from Williams, Hauser kick (Drive: 3 plays, 53 yards, 1:23; Clemson 42–14)

Fourth quarter

- (08:55) Clemson – Keith Adams Jr. 4-yard run, Hauser kick (Drive: 17 plays, 87 yards, 8:24; Clemson 49–7)

Statistics	CLEM	WAKE
First downs	37	16
Total yards	566	233
Rushing yards	223	87
Passing yards	343	146
Passing: Comp–Att–Int	33–44–0	14–29–2
Time of possession	36:29	22:31

Team	Category	Player	Statistics
Clemson	Passing	Cade Klubnik	31/41, 309 yards, 3 TDs
Clemson	Rushing	Phil Mafah	20 carries, 118 yards, 2 TDs
Clemson	Receiving	Jake Briningstool	7 receptions, 104 yards, 1 TD
Wake Forest	Passing	Hank Bachmeier	12/21, 126 yards, 2 TDs, 2 INTs
Wake Forest	Rushing	Demond Claiborne	18 carries, 53 yards
Wake Forest	Receiving	Deuce Alexander	3 receptions, 32 yards

=== at UConn ===
Game Seven – Wake Forest Demon Deacons (2–4) vs UConn Huskies (4–2) – Game summary

Quarter	1	2	3	4	Total
Demon Deacons	3	10	7	3	23
Huskies	3	3	7	7	20

at Rentschler Field • Hartford, Connecticut

- Date: Saturday October 19, 2024
- Game time: 12:00 p.m.
- Game weather: Temperature: 48 °F (9 °C) • Wind: S at 2 miles per hour (3.2 km/h) • Weather: Sunny
- Game attendance: 30,122
- Referee: Riley Johnson
- TV announcers (CBSSN): Thom Brennaman (play-by-play), Max Browne (analyst), and Treavor Scales (sideline)

Game information

First quarter

- WF - Dennis, Matthew 32 yd field goal, 3:55. Demon Deacons 3–0. Drive: 7 plays, 34 yards, TOP 03:50
- CONN - Freeman, Chris 35 yd field goal, 1:22. Tied 3–3. Drive: 11 plays, 58 yards, TOP 02:33

Second quarter

- WF - Claiborne, Demond 5 yd run (Carlson, Caleb kick), 13:21. Demon Deacons 10–3. Drive: 7 plays, 75 yards, TOP 02:45
- WF - Dennis, Matthew 31 yd field goal, 6:01. Demon Deacons 13–3. Drive: 13 plays, 70 yards, TOP 04:31
- CONN - Freeman, Chris 53 yd field goal, 1:50. Demon Deacons 13–6. Drive: 10 plays, 40 yards, TOP 04:11

Third quarter

- WF - Claiborne, Demond 1 yd run (Carlson, Caleb kick), 10:45. Demon Deacons 20–6. Drive: 8 plays, 75 yards, TOP 04:15
- CONN - Gathings, Jasaiah 20 yd pass from Evers, Nick (Freeman, Chris kick), 7:33. Demon Deacons 20–13. Drive: 7 plays, 50 yards, TOP 03:04

Fourth quarter

- WF - Dennis, Matthew 36 yd field goal, 11:13. Demon Deacons 23–13. Drive: 9 plays, 38 yards, TOP 05:02
- CONN - Hansen, Louis 25 yd pass from Evers, Nick (Freeman, Chris kick), 2:27. Demon Deacons 23–20. Drive: 13 plays, 88 yards, TOP 03:56

Statistics	WAKE	CONN
First downs	24	18
Total yards	391	304
Rushing yards	117	40
Passing yards	274	264
Passing: Comp–Att–Int	21–36–1	26–43–1
Time of possession	34:31	25:29

Team	Category	Player	Statistics
Wake Forest	Passing	Hank Bachmeier	21/36, 274 yards, INT
Wake Forest	Rushing	Demond Claiborne	24 carries, 60 yards, 2 TD
Wake Forest	Receiving	Taylor Morin	6 receptions, 104 yards
UConn	Passing	Nick Evers	26/43, 264 yards, 2 TD, INT
UConn	Rushing	Cam Edwards	7 carries, 26 yards
UConn	Receiving	Jasaiah Gathings	7 receptions, 75 yards, TD

=== at Stanford ===
Game Eight – Wake Forest Demon Deacons (3–4) vs Stanford Cardinal (2–5) – Game summary

Quarter	1	2	3	4	Total
Demon Deacons	14	10	0	3	27
Cardinal	0	17	0	7	24

at Stanford Stadium • Stanford, California

- Date: Saturday October 26, 2024
- Game time: 3:30 p.m.
- Game weather: Sunny, 69 °F (21 °C)
- Game attendance: 23,471
- Referee: Justin Elliott
- TV announcers (ACCN): Jorge Sedano (play-by-play), Orlando Franklin (analyst) and Marilyn Payne (sideline)

Game information

First quarter

- (8:47) WAKE – Micah Mays Jr. 30-yard pass from Hank Bachmeier, Matthew Dennis kick (Drive: 2 plays, 35 yards, 0:29; Wake Forest 7–0)
- (0:49) WAKE – Tate Carney 39-yard pass from Hank Bachmeier, Matthew Dennis kick (Drive: 9 plays, 72 yards, 2:35; Wake Forest 14–0)

Second quarter

- (12:44) STAN – Justin Lamson 1-yard run, Emmet Kenney kick (Drive: 8 plays, 69 yards, 2:59; Wake Forest 14–7)
- (8:58) STAN – Tevarua Tafiti 44-yard fumble recovery, Emmet Kenney kick (Tied 14–14)
- (4:24) WAKE – Matthew Dennis 35-yard field goal (Drive: 10 plays, 58 yards, 4:34; Wake Forest 17–14)
- (1:55) WAKE – Taylor Morin 18-yard pass from Hank Bachmeier, Matthew Dennis kick (Drive: 5 plays, 36 yards, 2:22; Wake Forest 24–14)
- (0:01) STAN – Emmet Kenney 40-yard field goal (Drive: 11 plays, 53 yards, 1:54; Wake Forest 24–17)

Third quarter

No scoring plays

Fourth quarter

- (8:41) STAN – Sam Roush 16-yard pass from Ashton Daniels, Emmet Kenney kick (Drive: 15 plays, 99 yards, 7:48; Tied 24–24)
- (1:48) WAKE – Matthew Dennis 23-yard field goal (Drive: 10 plays, 45 yards, 3:27; Wake Forest 27–24)

Statistics	WAKE	STAN
First downs	23	23
Total yards	418	346
Rushing yards	173	108
Passing yards	245	238
Passing: Comp–Att–Int	20–30–1	29–40–3
Time of possession	32:42	27:18

Team	Category	Player	Statistics
Wake Forest	Passing	Hank Bachmeier	20/30, 245 yards, 3 TD, INT
Wake Forest	Rushing	Demond Claiborne	23 carries, 127 yards
Wake Forest	Receiving	Demond Claiborne	3 receptions, 62 yards
Stanford	Passing	Ashton Daniels	24/31, 214 yards, TD, 2 INT
Stanford	Rushing	Ashton Daniels	11 carries, 54 yards
Stanford	Receiving	Elic Ayomanor	11 receptions, 96 yards

=== vs. California ===
Game Nine – California Golden Bears (4–4) vs Wake Forest Demon Deacons (4–4) – Game summary

Quarter	1	2	3	4	Total
Golden Bears	10	19	7	10	46
Demon Deacons	7	7	7	15	36

at Allegacy Federal Credit Union Stadium, Winston-Salem, North Carolina

- Date: Friday November 8, 2024
- Game time: 8:00 PM
- Game attendance: 28,455
- TV announcers (ACCN): Jorge Sedano (play-by-play), Orlando Franklin (analyst) and Morgan Uber (sideline)

Game information

First quarter
Second quarter
Third quarter
Fourth quarter

Statistics	CAL	WAKE
First downs	31	26
Total yards	500	386
Rushing yards	115	112
Passing yards	385	274
Passing: Comp–Att–Int	40–56–1	19–36–3
Time of possession	34:30	25:30

Team	Category	Player	Statistics
California	Passing	Fernando Mendoza	40/56, 385 yards, 2 TD, INT
California	Rushing	Fernando Mendoza	10 carries, 51 yards, TD
California	Receiving	Mikey Matthews	8 receptions, 83 yards, TD
Wake Forest	Passing	Hank Bachmeier	19/36, 274 yards, 2 TD, 3 INT
Wake Forest	Rushing	Demond Claiborne	23 carries, 113 yards, TD
Wake Forest	Receiving	Taylor Morin	9 receptions, 110 yards

=== at North Carolina (rivalry) ===
Game Ten – Wake Forest Demon Deacons (4–5) vs North Carolina Tar Heels (5–4) – Game summary

Quarter	1	2	3	4	Total
Demon Deacons	3	0	14	7	24
Tar Heels	0	10	24	7	41

at Kenan Memorial Stadium • Chapel Hill, North Carolina

- Date: Saturday November 16, 2024
- Game time: 8:00 p.m.
- Game attendance: 48,364
- Referee: Riley Johnson
- TV announcers (ACCN): Wes Durham (play-by-play), Tom Luginbill (analyst) and Dana Boyle (sideline)

Game information

First quarter

- (3:21) WFU - Matthew Dennis 33 yard field goal (Drive: 9 plays, 65 yards, 3:49) WFU 3-0

Second quarter

- (12:26) UNC - Jacolby Criswell 4 yard rush (Noah Burnette kick) (Drive: 11 plays, 75 yards, 5:55) UNC 7-3
- (0:01) UNC - Noah Burnette 24 yard field goal (Drive: 7 plays, 56 yards, 1:38) UNC 10-3

Third quarter

- (12:20) WFU - Demond Claiborne 2 yard rush (Matthew Dennis kick) (Drive: 7 plays, 75 yards, 2:40) 10-10
- (9:26) UNC - JJ Jones 15 yard pass from Jacolby Criswell (Noah Burnette kick) (Drive: 6 plays, 75 yards, 2:54) UNC 17-10
- (8:05) UNC - Power Echols 42 yard interception return (Noah Burnette kick) UNC 24-10
- (5:14) WFU - Demond Claiborne 7 yard rush (Matthew Dennis kick) (Drive: 1 play, 7 yards, 0:05) UNC 24-17

Fourth quarter

- (2:26) UNC - Omarion Hampton 6 yard rush (Noah Burnette kick) (Drive: 5 plays, 18 yards, 2:42) UNC 31-17
- (1:15) WFU - Taylor Morin 16 yard passs from Michael Kern (Matthew Dennis kick) (Drive: 9 plays, 75 yards, 1:11) UNC 31-24

Statistics	WAKE	UNC
First downs	19	21
Total yards	354	362
Rushing yards	114	230
Passing yards	240	132
Passing: Comp–Att–Int	24-37-2	14-22-0
Time of possession	24:59	35:01

Team	Category	Player	Statistics
Wake Forest	Passing	Michael Kern	14/23, 172 yards, TD, 2 INT
Wake Forest	Rushing	Demond Claiborne	20 carries, 95 yards, 2 TD
Wake Forest	Receiving	Taylor Morin	4 receptions, 70 yards, TD
North Carolina	Passing	Jacolby Criswell	14/22, 132 yards, TD
North Carolina	Rushing	Omarion Hampton	35 carries, 244 yards, TD
North Carolina	Receiving	J.J. Jones	2 receptions, 35 yards, TD

=== at No. 8 Miami (FL) ===
Game Eleven – Wake Forest Demon Deacons (4–6) vs No. 8 Miami Hurricanes (9–1) – Game summary

Quarter	1	2	3	4	Total
Demon Deacons	7	7	0	0	14
No. 8 Hurricanes	10	10	0	22	42

at Hard Rock Stadium • Miami Gardens, FL

- Date: Saturday November 23, 2024
- Game time: 12:00 p.m.
- Game weather: Sunny • Temperature: 66 °F (19 °C) • Wind: N 13 miles per hour (21 km/h)
- Game attendance: 64,210
- Referee: Nate Black
- TV announcers (ESPN): Mark Jones (play-by-play), Roddy Jones (analyst), and Quint Kessenich (sideline reporter)

Game information

First quarter

- (8:32) MIA – Jacolby George 13-yard pass from Cam Ward, Andres Borregales kick (Drive: 13 plays, 84 yards, 6:22; Miami 7–0)
- (5:31) WAKE – Micah Mays Jr. 36-yard pass from Hank Bachmeier, Matthew Dennis kick (Drive: 7 plays, 75 yards, 3:01; Tied 7–7)
- (1:52) MIA – Andres Borregales 40-yard field goal (Drive: 8 plays, 53 yards, 3:39; Miami 10–7)

Second quarter

- (7:50) MIA – Mishael Powell 76-yard interception return, Andre Borregales kick (Miami 17–7)
- (7:35) WAKE – Demond Claiborne 100-yard kick return, Matthew Dennis kick (Miami 17–14)
- (0:04) MIA – Andres Borregales 25-yard field goal (Drive: 11 plays, 71 yards, 1:42; Miami 20–14)

Third quarter

- No scoring plays.

Fourth quarter

- (7:58) MIA – Cam Ward 1-yard run, Elijah Arroyo-Cam Ward two-point pass (Drive: 5 plays, 43 yards, 2:37; Miami 28–14)
- (6:24) MIA – Jordan Lyle 18-yard run, Andre Borregales kick (Drive: 3 plays, 10 yards, 1:27; Miami 35–14)
- (1:53) MIA – Jacolby George 15-yard pass from Cam Ward, Andre Borregales kick (Drive: 4 plays, 85 yards, 2:12; Miami 42–0)

Statistics	WAKE	MIA
First downs	12	27
Total yards	193	508
Rushing yards	94	228
Passing yards	99	280
Passing: Comp–Att–Int	9–17–1	27–38–1
Time of possession	29:40	30:20

Team	Category	Player	Statistics
Wake Forest	Passing	Hank Bachmeier	8/14, 86 yards, TD, INT
Wake Forest	Rushing	Demond Claiborne	19 carries, 62 yards
Wake Forest	Receiving	Micah Mays Jr.	1 reception, 36 yards, TD
Miami (FL)	Passing	Cam Ward	27/38, 280 yards, 2 TD, INT
Miami (FL)	Rushing	Jordan Lyle	7 carries, 115 yards, TD
Miami (FL)	Receiving	Jacolby George	7 receptions, 91 yards, 2 TD

=== vs. Duke ===
Game Twelve – Duke Blue Devils (8–3) vs Wake Forest Demon Deacons (4–7) – Game summary

Quarter	1	2	3	4	Total
Blue Devils	0	3	7	13	23
Demon Deacons	0	10	7	0	17

at Allegacy Federal Credit Union Stadium, Winston-Salem, North Carolina

- Date: Saturday November 30, 2024
- Game time: 12:00 p.m.
- Game attendance: 24,776
- TV announcers (ACCN): Jorge Sedano (play-by-play), Orlando Franklin (analyst) and Morgan Uber (sideline)

Game information

First quarter
Second quarter
Third quarter
Fourth quarter

Statistics	DUKE	WAKE
First downs	18	20
Total yards	333	318
Rushing yards	98	111
Passing yards	235	207
Passing: Comp–Att–Int	26-34-1	22-30-0
Time of possession	24:56	35:04

Team	Category	Player	Statistics
Duke	Passing	Maalik Murphy	26/34, 235 yards, TD
Duke	Rushing	Star Thomas	14 carries, 66 yards, TD
Duke	Receiving	Jordan Moore	5 receptions, 98 yards, TD
Wake Forest	Passing	Hank Bachmeier	22/30, 207 yards, TD
Wake Forest	Rushing	Demond Claiborne	20 carries, 67 yards
Wake Forest	Receiving	Horatio Fields	6 receptions, 84 yards, TD
