= 2024 North Carolina Tar Heels football team =

American college football season

2024 North Carolina Tar Heels football

Fenway Bowl, L 14–27 vs. UConn
- Conference: Atlantic Coast Conference
- Record: 6–7 (3–5 ACC)
- Head coach: Mack Brown (16th season; regular season); Freddie Kitchens (interim; bowl game)
- Offensive coordinator: Chip Lindsey (2nd season)
- Offensive scheme: Up-tempo spread
- Defensive coordinator: Geoff Collins (1st season)
- Co-defensive coordinator: Tommy Thigpen (6th season)
- Base defense: 4–3
- Home stadium: Kenan Stadium

2024 Atlantic Coast Conference football standings
	Conf.			Overall
Team	W		L	W		L
No. 12 SMU y^	8	–	0	11	–	3
No. 14 Clemson y$^	7	–	1	10	–	4
No. 18 Miami (FL)	6	–	2	10	–	3
No. 20 Syracuse	5	–	3	10	–	3
Duke	5	–	3	9	–	4
Louisville	5	–	3	9	–	4
Georgia Tech	5	–	3	7	–	6
Boston College	4	–	4	7	–	6
Virginia Tech	4	–	4	6	–	7
Pittsburgh	3	–	5	7	–	6
NC State	3	–	5	6	–	7
North Carolina	3	–	5	6	–	7
Virginia	3	–	5	5	–	7
California	2	–	6	6	–	7
Wake Forest	2	–	6	4	–	8
Stanford	2	–	6	3	–	9
Florida State	1	–	7	2	–	10
Championship: Clemson 34, SMU 31
^ – College Football Playoff participant; $ – Conference champion; y – Championship game participant; Rankings from AP Poll

The 2024 North Carolina Tar Heels football team represented the University of North Carolina at Chapel Hill as a member of the Atlantic Coast Conference (ACC) during the 2024 NCAA Division I FBS football season. The Tar Heels were led by head coach Mack Brown, who was in the sixth season of his second stint at North Carolina and 16th overall season at the university. The team played their home games at Kenan Stadium.

On November 26, North Carolina announced this was to be Brown's last season as head coach. Run game coordinator/tight ends coach Freddie Kitchens was named interim head coach on December 1.

== Offseason ==
=== Coaching changes ===
After the conclusion of the 2023 season, the following changes were made to the Tar Heel football staff for the 2024 season.

Name	Position	Reason	Replacement
Gene Chizik	Assistant Head Coach for Defense/Defensive Coordinator	Dismissed	Geoff Collins
Tim Cross	Defensive line coach	Dismissed	Ted Monachino
Darrell Moody	Senior Advisor to the Head Coach	Retired	Brian Simmons
Sparky Woods	Senior Advisor to the Head Coach	Resigned	N/A

Defensive backs coach/Co-DC Charlton Warren will receive title of Assistant Head Coach for Defense, Collins' title will be solely Defensive Coordinator.
Mack Brown announced in February that no additional staff hires will be made to replace Woods, but rather existing staff members will have some duties reshuffled.

=== Departures ===
==== NFL draft ====
The following Tar Heels were selected in the 2024 NFL draft.

Round	Pick	Player	Position	NFL team
1	3	Drake Maye	QB	New England Patriots
4	106	Cedric Gray	LB	Tennessee Titans
4	113	Devontez Walker	WR	Baltimore Ravens

==== Transfers ====
Name	No.	Pos.	Height	Weight	Hometown	Year	New school
Kamari Morales	88	TE	6'3"	250	Tallahassee, FL	Senior	Boston College
Kedrick Bingley-Jones	41	DL	6'4"	295	Charlotte, NC	Junior	Mississippi State
Jefferson Boaz	14	QB	6'6.5"	245	Pilot Mountain, NC	Junior	Western Carolina
Elijah Green	21	RB	5'11.5"	205	Roswell, GA	Junior	Indiana
Jalen Brooks	36	LB	5'10.5"	240	Knightdale, NC	Junior	Campbell
Ryan Coe	40	K	6'3"	225	McDonald, PA	Senior	California
Cole Maynard	92	P	6'1"	181	Mooresville, NC	Sophomore	Western Kentucky
Tychaun Chapman	0	WR	5'9.5"	164	Virginia Beach, VA	(redshirt) Freshman	Marshall
Andre Greene Jr.	1	WR	6'2.5"	175	Richmond, VA	(redshirt) Freshman	Virginia
George Pettaway	23	RB	5'11"	183	Suffolk, VA	Sophomore	James Madison
Justin Kanyuk	74	IOL	6'7"	290	Bethlehem, PA	(redshirt) Freshman	Georgia Southern
Russell Tabor	16	QB	6'2"	215	Charlotte, NC	Sophomore	«»
Deuce Caldwell	44	LB	6'1"	210	Mauldin, SC	Sophomore	Samford
Sebastian Cheeks	32	LB	6'3"	216	Evanston, IL	(redshirt) Freshman	Wisconsin
Tayon Holloway	20	CB	6'1"	164	Virginia Beach, VA	(redshirt) Freshman	Louisville
D.J. Jones	26	RB	5'10.5"	205	Fayetteville, NC	Senior	Wyoming
Diego Pounds	61	OT	6'7"	330	Raleigh, NC	(redshirt) Sophomore	Ole Miss
Chance Carroll	54	IOL	6'2"	300	Cornelius, NC	Junior	Georgia Southern
Tad Hudson	12	QB	6'2"	225	Huntersville, NC	Freshman	Coastal Carolina
D.J. Geth	68	OL	6'3"	305	Spartanburg, SC	Freshman	Liberty
Lejond Cavazos	6	DB	6'0"	200	San Antonio, TX	Junior	Michigan State
Ayden Duncanson	13	DB	6'0"	185	Atlanta, GA	Freshman	ECU
Milad Aghaiepour	48	LB	5'10"	220	Chapel Hill, NC	Sophomore	North Carolina Central

«» Indicates player has not yet enrolled at a new school.

=== Additions ===
==== Incoming transfers ====
Name	No.	Pos.	Height	Weight	Hometown	Year	Previous school
Max Johnson	14	QB	6'4.5"	215	Watkinsville, GA	Junior	Texas A&M
Jakeen Harris	6	S	5'11"	183	Savannah, GA	Senior	NC State
Darwin Barlow	22	RB	5'11"	195	Newton, TX	(redshirt) Senior	USC
Howard Sampson	79	OT	6'8"	325	Humble, TX	(redshirt) Freshman	North Texas
Austin Blaske	58	OT	6'5"	310	Guyton, GA	Junior	Georgia
Jake Johnson	19	TE	6'4.5"	206	Bogart, GA	Sophomore	Texas A&M
Zach Greenberg	63	OL	6'4"	290	Livingston, NJ	Graduate	Muhlenberg
Jakiah Leftwich	75	OL	6'6"	310	Atlanta, GA	Junior	Georgia Tech
Jacolby Criswell	12	QB	6'1"	230	Morrilton, AR	Graduate	Arkansas†
Joshua Harris	6	DL	6'4"	325	Roxboro, NC	Graduate	Ole Miss

† Criswell began his career at UNC, spending three seasons as backup QB to Sam Howell and Drake Maye, before spending the 2023 season at Arkansas.

==== Recruiting class ====
College recruiting
Name	Hometown	School	Height	Weight	Commit date
Overall recruit ranking: Rivals: #21 247Sports: #51 ESPN: #
Note: In many cases, Scout, Rivals, 247Sports, On3, and ESPN may conflict in their listings of height and weight.; In these cases, the average was taken. ESPN grades are on a 100-point scale.; Sources: "Rivals commits". Rivals.; "ESPN commits". ESPN.; "2024 Team Ranking". Rivals.com.; "247Sports commits". 247Sports.

== Personnel ==
=== Coaching staff ===
North Carolina Tar Heels coaches
Mack Brown	Head coach	16th
Chip Lindsey	Offensive coordinator/quarterbacks coach	2nd
Freddie Kitchens	Run game coordinator/Tight ends coach	2nd
Randy Clements	Offensive line coach	2nd
Lonnie Galloway	Assistant head coach/Pass Game coordinator/Wide receivers	6th
Larry Porter	Special Teams coordinator/Running backs	4th
Geoff Collins	Defensive coordinator	1st
Charlton Warren	Assistant head coach/Defensive backs coach	3rd
Tommy Thigpen	Co-defensive coordinator/Inside Linebackers coach	7th
Ted Monachino	Defensive line coach	2nd
Jason Jones	Cornerbacks coach	2nd
Brian Hess	Head strength and conditioning coach	6th
Brian Simmons	Senior advisor to head coach	1st
Clyde Christensen	Offensive Analyst	2nd
Natrone Means	Offensive Analyst	4th

=== Roster ===
2024 North Carolina Tar Heels Football Roster
Quarterback: 12 Jacolby Criswell – graduate (6'1, 230); 13 DJ Mazzone – freshman (6'0, 175); 14 Max Johnson – graduate (6'5, 225); 15 Conner Harrell – sophomore (6'2, 210); 16 Ben Bastek – freshman (5'8, 175); 17 Michael Merdinger – freshman (6'1, 210); 18 Andres Miyares Jr. – freshman (6'1, 210); 19 Hudson Wilharm – freshman (6'5, 195); Running back: 4 Caleb Hood – senior (5'11, 220); 21 Davion Gause – freshman (5'11, 215); 23 Charleston French – sophomore (5'9, 205); 24 Darwin Barlow – graduate (6'0, 220); 28 Omarion Hampton – junior (6'0, 220); 34 Jordan Louie – (redshirt) freshman (5'10, 215); Wide receiver: 0 Alex Taylor – freshman (6'1, 190); 1 Jordan Shipp – freshman (6'1, 190); 2 Gavin Blackwell – junior (5'11, 185); 3 Chris Culliver – sophomore (6'1, 195); 5 J.J. Jones – senior (6'2, 210); 6 Nate McCollum – senior (5'9, 185); 7 Christian Hamilton – (redshirt) freshman (6'0, 190); 8 Kobe Paysour – junior (6'1, 190); 9 Javarius Green – freshman (5'9, 195); 11 Paul Billups II – (redshirt) freshman (6'2, 195); 13 Tylee Craft – graduate (6'5, 200); 20 Brooks Miller – junior (5'11, 180); 27 Michael Hall – sophomore (6'0, 180); 38 Aiden Cloninger – sophomore (5'11, 195); 83 Josh Espindola – (redshirt) freshman (5'11, 195); 84 Cyrus Rogers – junior (5'11, 185); 85 Grady Sherrill – sophomore (5'9, 180); 86 Thomas Flynn – junior (6'3, 200); Placekicker: 37 Liam Boyd – sophomore (6'1, 200); 97 Lucas Osada – freshman (6'1, 190); 98 Noah Burnette – graduate (5'10, 175); Punter: 96 Tom Maginness – junior (6'0, 210)	Tight end: 16 Ryan Ward – freshman (6'3, 245); 18 Bryson Nesbit – senior (6'5, 235); 19 Jake Johnson – sophomore (6'5, 240); 80 Julien Randolph – (redshirt) freshman (6'5, 245); 81 John Copenhaver – graduate (6'3, 240); 82 Timmy Lawson - freshman (6'3, 230); 87 Cort Halsey – (redshirt) freshman (6'2, 215); 88 Deems May – sophomore (6'2, 230); 89 Cal Tierney – junior (6'5, 235); Offensive line: 52 Jonathan Adorno – senior (6'4, 315); 53 Willie Lampkin – senior (5'11, 290); 54 Zach Gluckman – freshman (6'1, 285); 55 Zach Rice – sophomore (6'5, 305); 56 Jani Norwood – freshman (6'3, 290); 57 Bo Burkes – sophomore (6'2, 305); 58 Austin Blaske – graduate (6'5, 310); 60 Carter Kulka – junior (6'3, 270); 63 Zach Greenberg – graduate (6'4, 300); 64 Malik McGowan – junior (6'5, 325); 65 Andrew Rosinski – freshman (6'5, 280); 67 Jason Smith – freshman (6'3, 310); 68 Aidan Banfield – freshman (6'3, 300); 69 Jarvis Hicks – sophomore (6'7, 310)'; 71 Luke Masterson – freshman (6'7, 290); 73 Eli Sutton – junior (6'7, 310); 74 Desmond Jackson – freshman (6'3, 310); 75 Jakiah Leftwich – junior (6'6, 315); 77 Hayes Galloway – freshman (6'4, 320); 78 Trevyon Green – sophomore (6'7, 340); 79 Howard Sampson – sophomore (6'8, 325); Defensive line: 4 Travis Shaw – junior (6'5, 330); 5 Jahvaree Ritzie – senior (6'4, 290); 6 Joshua Harris – graduate (6'4, 325); 10 Desmond Evans – senior (6'6, 270); 12 Beau Atkinson – sophomore (6'6, 265); 51 Peter Pesansky – freshman (6'2, 290); 91 Leroy Jackson – freshman (6'1, 290); 92 Rodney Lora – (redshirt) freshman (6'3, 295); 93 Jacolbe Cowan – senior (6'5, 280); 94 Joel Starlings – (redshirt) freshman (6'4, 320); 96 Damon Bremer – (redshirt) freshman (6'2, 285); 98 Kevin Hester Jr. – graduate (6'4, 310)	Rush: 7 Kaimon Rucker – graduate (6'2, 265); 14 Jaybron Harvey – (redshirt) freshman (6'2, 240); 24 Mali Hamrick – sophomore (6'3, 215); 33 Curtis Simpson – freshman (6'3, 215); 40 Tyler Thompson – (redshirt) freshman (6'4, 225); 95 Daniel Anderson – freshman (6'1, 245); Linebacker: 17 Amare Campbell – sophomore (6'0, 230); 23 Power Echols – senior (6'0, 225); 25 Ashton Woods – freshman (6'3, 220); 30 Michael Short – freshman (6'0, 230); 32 Evan Bennett – freshman (6'2, 230); 34 Caleb LaVallee – (redshirt) freshman (6'1, 225); 44 Crews Law – freshman (6'1, 225); 47 CJ Murphy – sophomore (6'2, 240); 53 Gibson Macrae – junior (5'11, 215); 55 Cade Law – sophomore (6'0, 225); Defensive back: 0 Ty White – freshman (5'9, 185); 1 Antavious Lane – senior (5'8, 195); 2 Jakeen Harris – graduate (5'10, 195); 3 Malcolm Ziglar – freshman (6'2, 195); 8 Zion Ferguson – freshman (6'1, 210); 9 Tyrane Stewart – junior (5'11, 190); 11 Ty Adams – (redshirt) freshman (5'11, 180); 15 Tre Miller – (redshirt) freshman (5'9, 180); 16 DeAndre Boykins – junior (6'0, 200); 18 Jaiden Patterson – freshman (6'1, 195); 19 Reggie Love II – (redshirt) freshman (5'8, 175); 20 Jalon Thompson – freshman (5'11, 185); 21 Kaleb Cost – sophomore (5'10, 195); 26 Khalil Conley – freshman (5'11, 185); 27 Miles Gaddy – freshman (6'1, 175); 28 Alijah Huzzie – graduate (5'10, 195); 29 Marcus Allen – junior (6'1, 190); 31 Will Hardy – junior (6'2, 205); 35 Jaden Selby – sophomore (6'0, 190)'; 36 Blaine McClure – freshman (6'1, 185)'; 37 Jack Blythe – (redshirt) freshman (6'2, 190); 39 Major Byrd – (redshirt) freshman (5'9, 200); 41 Kenyon McMahon – freshman (6'0, 180); Long snappers: 43 Garrett Jordan – sophomore (6'0, 225); 61 Grant Mills – freshman (5'11, 210); 62 Spencer Triplett – graduate (6'1, 240)
* North Carolina Tar Heels Football Roster as of 7/17/2024

== Schedule ==
Date	Time	Opponent	Site	TV	Result	Attendance
August 29	9:00 p.m.	at Minnesota*	Huntington Bank Stadium; Minneapolis, MN	FOX	W 19–17	50,805
September 7	3:30 p.m.	Charlotte*	Kenan Stadium; Chapel Hill, NC	ACCN	W 38–20	48,431
September 14	6:00 p.m.	North Carolina Central*	Kenan Stadium; Chapel Hill, NC	ACCNX/ESPN+	W 45–10	45,491
September 21	12:00 p.m.	James Madison*	Kenan Stadium; Chapel Hill, NC	ACCN	L 50–70	50,500
September 28	4:00 p.m.	at Duke	Wallace Wade Stadium; Durham, NC (Victory Bell)	ESPN2	L 20–21	35,018
October 5	12:00 p.m.	Pittsburgh^{†}	Kenan Stadium; Chapel Hill, NC	ESPN2	L 24–34	46,033
October 12	12:00 p.m.	Georgia Tech	Kenan Stadium; Chapel Hill, NC	The CW	L 34–41	44,482
October 26	12:00 p.m.	at Virginia	Scott Stadium; Charlottesville, VA (South's Oldest Rivalry)	The CW	W 41–14	44,550
November 2	3:30 p.m.	at Florida State	Doak Campbell Stadium; Tallahassee, FL	ACCN	W 35–11	55,107
November 16	8:00 p.m.	Wake Forest	Kenan Stadium; Chapel Hill, NC (rivalry)	ACCN	W 31–24	48,364
November 23	12:00 p.m.	at Boston College	Alumni Stadium; Chestnut Hill, MA	The CW	L 21–41	37,801
November 30	3:30 p.m.	NC State	Kenan Stadium; Chapel Hill, NC (rivalry)	ACCN	L 30–35	50,500
December 28	11:00 a.m.	vs. UConn	Fenway Park; Boston, MA (Fenway Bowl)	ESPN	L 14–27	27,900
*Non-conference game; ^{†}Homecoming; All times are in Eastern time

== Game summaries ==
=== at Minnesota ===
Game One – North Carolina Tar Heels (0-0) vs Minnesota Golden Gophers (0-0) – Game summary

Quarter	1	2	3	4	Total
Tar Heels	0	7	6	6	19
Golden Gophers	0	14	0	3	17

at Huntington Bank Stadium • Minneapolis, Minnesota

- Date: August 29
- Game time: 9:00 p.m.
- Game weather: Cloudy • Temperature: 75 °F (24 °C) • Wind: SW at 7 miles per hour (11 km/h)
- Game attendance: 50,805
- Referee: Kole Knueppel
- TV announcers (FOX): Jason Benetti (play-by-play), Brock Huard (analyst), and Allison Williams (sideline reporter)
- "UNC vs. Minnesota" (PDF).

Game information

First quarter

- no scoring

Second quarter

- (11:12) UNC – Max Johnson 3-yard run (Noah Burnette kick) (Drive: 9 plays, 80 yards, 4:19) UNC 7–0
- (7:35) MINN – Marcus Major 5-yard run (Dragan Kesich kick) (Drive: 2 plays, 6 yards, 0:45) 7-7
- (0:55) MINN – Max Brosmer 1-yard run (Dragan Kesich kick) (Drive: 9 plays, 65 yards, 5:04) MINN 14-7

Third quarter

- (6:34) UNC – Noah Burnette 29-yard field goal (Drive: 17 plays, 70 yards, 8:21) MINN 14-10
- (0:19) UNC – Noah Burnette 52-yard field goal (Drive: 12 plays, 49 yards, 5:13) MINN 14-13

Fourth quarter

- (9:05) UNC – Noah Burnette 42-yard field goal (Drive: 4 plays, -2 yards, 2:28) UNC 16-14
- (3:40) MINN – Dragan Kesich 30-yard field goal (Drive: 10 plays, 63 yards, 5:25) MINN 17-16
- (1:44) UNC – Noah Burnette 45-yard field goal (Drive: 6 plays, 48 yards, 1:56) North Carolina 19-17

Statistics	UNC	MINN
First downs	18	14
Total yards	64–252	54–244
Rushing yards	41–147	33–78
Passing yards	105	166
Passing: Comp–Att–Int	14–23–1	13–21–0
Time of possession	30:31	29:29

Team	Category	Player	Statistics
North Carolina	Passing	Max Johnson	12/19, 71 yards, INT
North Carolina	Rushing	Omarion Hampton	30 carries, 129 yards
North Carolina	Receiving	JJ Jones	3 receptions, 52 yards
Minnesota	Passing	Max Brosmer	13/21, 166 yards
Minnesota	Rushing	Marcus Major	20 carries, 73 yards, TD
Minnesota	Receiving	Daniel Jackson	4 receptions, 55 yards

=== vs. Charlotte ===
Game Two – Charlotte 49ers (0–1) at North Carolina Tar Heels (1–0) – Game summary

Quarter	1	2	3	4	Total
49ers	3	3	7	7	20
Tar Heels	14	7	10	7	38

at Kenan Stadium, Chapel Hill, North Carolina

- Date: Saturday September 7, 2024
- Game time: 3:30 PM
- Game weather: Sunny • Temperature: 81 °F (27 °C) • Wind: NW at 3 miles per hour (4.8 km/h)
- Game attendance: 48,431
- Referee: Kevin Randall
- TV announcers (ACCN): Jorge Sedano (play-by-play), Orlando Franklin (analyst), and Morgan Uber (sideline reporter)
- "UNC-Charlotte FB final stats" (PDF).

Game information

First quarter

- (8:43) UNC – Bryson Nesbit 30 yard pass from Conner Harrell, Noah Burnette kick (Drive: 9 plays, 94 yards, 3:11) UNC 7–0
- (4:43) CLT – Kyle Cunanan 25 yard field goal (Drive: 10 plays, 67 yards, 4:00) UNC 7–3
- (3:16) UNC – Nate McCollum 37 yard run, Noah Burnette kick (Drive: 5 plays, 75 yards, 1:27) UNC 14–3

Second quarter

- (12:29) CLT – Kyle Cunanan 20 yard field goal (Drive: 9 plays, 72 yards, 5:47) UNC 14–6
- (6:00) UNC – Conner Harrell 4 yard run, Noah Burnette kick (Drive: 13 plays, 75 yards, 6:29) UNC 21–6

Third quarter

- (11:46) CLT – Bryce Kennon 5 yard pass from Deshawn Purdie, Kyle Cunanan kick (Drive: 8 plays, 75 yards, 3:14) UNC 21–13
- (10:54) UNC – Christian Hamilton 58 yard pass from Conner Harrell, Noah Burnette kick (Drive: 2 plays, 74 yards, 0:46) UNC 28–13
- (4:09) UNC – Noah Burnette 44 yard field goal (Drive: 8 plays, 53 yards, 3:45) UNC 31–13

Fourth quarter

- (6:39) UNC – Davion Gause 1 yard run, Liam Boyd kick (Drive: 11 plays, 85 yards, 5:57) UNC 38–13
- (4:51) CLT – Henry Rutledge 28 yard pass from Deshawn Purdie, Kyle Cunanan kick (Drive: 5 plays, 75 yards, 1:48) UNC 38–20

Statistics	CLT	UNC
First downs	13	28
Total yards	358	490
Rushing yards	49	269
Passing yards	309	221
Passing: Comp–Att–Int	17–31–0	17–26–1
Time of possession	26:36	33:24

Team	Category	Player	Statistics
Charlotte	Passing	Max Brown	8/12, 175 yards
Charlotte	Rushing	Hahsaun Wilson	8 carries, 29 yards
Charlotte	Receiving	Jairus Mack	5 receptions, 118 yards
North Carolina	Passing	Conner Harrell	16/25, 219 yards, 2 TD, 1 INT
North Carolina	Rushing	Davion Gause	16 carries, 105 yards, 1 TD
North Carolina	Receiving	Christian Hamilton	1 reception, 58 yards, 1 TD

=== vs. North Carolina Central (FCS) ===
Game Three – North Carolina Central Eagles (FCS) (1–1) at North Carolina Tar Heels (2–0) – Game summary

Quarter	1	2	3	4	Total
Eagles (FCS)	7	3	0	0	10
Tar Heels	0	17	0	28	45

at Kenan Stadium, Chapel Hill, North Carolina

- Date: Saturday September 14, 2024
- Game time: 6:00 PM
- Game weather: Cloudy • 78 °F (26 °C) • Wind: NE at 10 miles per hour (16 km/h)
- Game attendance: 45,491
- Referee: Marcus Woods
- TV announcers (ACCNX/ESPN+): Kevin Fitzgerald (play-by-play), Charlie Strong (analyst), and Ashley Stroehlein (sideline reporter)
- "NC Central vs. UNC game book" (PDF).

Game information

First quarter

- (7:32) NCCU – J'Mari Taylor 5-yard run (Juan Velarde kick) (Drive: 12 plays, 75 yards, 7:28) NCCU 7-0

Second quarter

- (14:38) UNC – Omarion Hampton 11-yard run (Liam Boyd kick) (Drive: 4 plays, 41 yards, 1:15) 7-7
- (10:06) UNC — Omarion Hampton 2-yard run (Liam Boyd kick) (Drive: 10 plays, 67 yards, 3:35) UNC 14-7
- (5:51) UNC — Liam Boyd 36-yard field goal (Drive: 7 plays, 65 yards, 2:17) UNC 17-7
- (0:00) NCCU - Juan Velarde 35-yard field goal (Drive: 14 plays, 47 yards, 5:51) UNC 17-10

Third quarter

- No Scoring

Fourth quarter

- (14:12) UNC — John Copenhaver 23-yard pass from Jacolby Criswell (Liam Boyd kick) (Drive: 5 plays, 71 yards, 1:41) UNC 24-10
- (10:42) UNC — Omarion Hampton 4-yard run (Liam Boyd kick) (Drive: 5 plays, 30 yards, 1:59) UNC 31-10
- (5:59) UNC — Davion Gause 1-yard run (Liam Boyd kick) (Drive: 7 plays, 56 yards, 2:34) UNC 38-10
- (0:38) UNC — Charleston French 45-yard run (Liam Boyd kick) (Drive: 4 plays, 71 yards, 1:28) UNC 45-10

Statistics	NCCU	UNC
First downs	16	26
Total yards	167	513
Rushing yards	76	330
Passing yards	91	183
Passing: Comp–Att–Int	9-21-1	16-29-0
Time of possession	33:41	26:19

Team	Category	Player	Statistics
North Carolina Central	Passing	Walker Harris	7/15, 88 yards
North Carolina Central	Rushing	J'Mari Taylor	21 carries, 46 yards, TD
North Carolina Central	Receiving	Chance Peterson	5 receptions, 60 yards
North Carolina	Passing	Jacolby Criswell	14/23, 161 yards, TD
North Carolina	Rushing	Omarion Hampton	25 carries, 210 yards, 3 TD
North Carolina	Receiving	John Copenhaver	6 receptions, 60 yards, TD

=== vs. James Madison ===
Game Four – James Madison Dukes (2–0) at North Carolina Tar Heels (3–0) – Game summary

Quarter	1	2	3	4	Total
Dukes	25	28	7	10	70
Tar Heels	14	7	17	12	50

at Kenan Stadium, Chapel Hill, North Carolina

- Date: Saturday September 21, 2024
- Game time: 12:00 PM
- Game weather: Sunny • 80 °F (27 °C)
- Game attendance: 50,500
- Referee: Riley Johnson
- TV announcers (ACCN): Jorge Sedano (play-by-play), Orlando Franklin (analyst) and Morgan Uber (sideline)
- "UNC-JMU football stats" (PDF).

Game information
First quarter
- (13:36) JMU – Noe Ruelas 50 yard field goal (Drive: 5 plays, 44 yards, 1:24) JMU 3–0
- (10:36) JMU – Jayden Mines 14 yard blocked punt return (Jack Mowrey pass from Noe Ruelas) JMU 11–0
- (8:12) UNC – John Copenhaver 35 yard pass from Jacolby Criswell (Noah Burnette kick) (Drive: 6 plays, 77 yards, 2:19) JMU 11–7
- (4:08) UNC – Omarion Hampton 28 yard run (Noah Burnette kick) (Drive: 5 plays, 80 yards, 1:58.) UNC 14–11
- (3:36) JMU – Omarion Dollison 69 yard pass from Alonza Barnett III (Noe Ruelas kick) (Drive: 2 plays, 75 yards, 0:32) JMU 18–14
- (1:23) JMU – Alonza Barnett III 3 yard run (Noe Ruelas kick) (Drive: 5 plays, 61 yards, 2:11) JMU 25–14

Second quarter

- (14:33) UNC – Bryson Nesbit 34 yard pass from Jacolby Criswell (Noah Burnette kick) (Drive: 6 plays, 75 yards, 1:50) JMU 25–21
- (10:20) JMU – Cam Ross 6 yard pass from Alonza Barnett III (Noe Ruelas kick) (Drive: 8 plays, 75 yards, 4:13) JMU 32–21
- (8:45) JMU – Taylor Thompson 13 yard pass from Alonza Barnett III (Noe Ruelas kick) (Drive: 2 plays, 69 yards, 0:29) JMU 39–21
- (7:14) JMU – Alonza Barnett III 27 yard run (Noe Ruelas kick) (Drive: 1 play, 27 yards, 0:10) JMU 46–21
- (0:56) JMU – Terrence Spence 33 yard interception return (Noe Ruelas kick) JMU 53–21

Third quarter

- (11:35) UNC – Noah Burnette 42 yard field goal (Drive: 9 plays, 50 yards, 3:25.) JMU 53–24
- (9:16) JMU – Dylan Williams 7 yard pass from Alonza Barnett III (Noe Ruelas kick) (Drive: 6 plays, 75 yards, 2:19) JMU 60–24
- (7:11) UNC – Omarion Hampton 15 yard run (Jacolby Criswell pass to Bryson Nesbit) (Drive: 6 plays, 79 yards, 2:01) JMU 60–32
- (3:08) UNC – Davion Gause 34 yard blocked punt return (2-point pass failed) JMU 60–38

Fourth quarter

- (13:28) JMU – Noe Ruelas 44 yard field goal (Drive: 10 plays, 50 yards, 4:40) JMU 63–38
- (11:00) UNC – Omarion Hampton 2 yard run (2-point pass failed) (Drive: 7 plays, 78 yards, 2:19) JMU 63–44
- (4:26) JMU – Logan Kyle 11 yard pass from Alonza Barnett III (Noe Ruelas kick) (Drive: 7 plays, 33 yards, 4:53) JMU 70–44
- (1:18) UNC – Jordan Shipp 5 yard pass from Jacolby Criswell (2-point pass failed) (Drive: 12 plays, 80 yards, 3:01) JMU 70–50

Statistics	JMU	UNC
First downs	25	30
Total yards	611	616
Rushing yards	223	141
Passing yards	388	475
Passing: Comp–Att–Int	22–34–0	28–48–2
Time of possession	34:04	25:56

Team	Category	Player	Statistics
James Madison	Passing	Alonza Barnett III	22/34, 388 yards, 5 TD
James Madison	Rushing	Alonza Barnett III	13 rushes, 99 yards, 2 TD
James Madison	Receiving	Omarion Dollison	3 receptions, 125 yards, TD
North Carolina	Passing	Jacolby Criswell	28/48, 475 yards, 3 TD, 2 INT
North Carolina	Rushing	Omarion Hampton	13 rushes, 139 yards, 3 TD
North Carolina	Receiving	Kobe Paysour	4 receptions, 93 yards

=== at Duke (Victory Bell) ===
Game Five – North Carolina Tar Heels (3–1) at Duke Blue Devils (4–0) – Game summary

Quarter	1	2	3	4	Total
Tar Heels	10	7	3	0	20
Blue Devils	0	0	7	14	21

at Wallace Wade Stadium • Durham, NC

- Date: Saturday September 28, 2024
- Game time: 4:00 p.m.
- Game weather: Sunny • 81 °F (27 °C)
- Game attendance: 35,018
- Referee: Gary Patterson
- TV announcers (ESPN2): Mike Monaco (play-by-play), Kirk Morrison (analyst) and Dawn Davenport (sideline)
- "UNC-Duke football final stats" (PDF).

Game information

First quarter

- (10:19) UNC - Noah Burnette 40 yard field goal Drive: 6 plays, 33 yards, 1:31 UNC 3–0
- (4:34) UNC - JJ Jones 24 yard pass from Jacolby Criswell (Noah Burnette kick) Drive: 10 plays, 57 yards, 4:04 UNC 10–0

Second quarter

- (5:43) UNC - Bryson Nesbit 10 yard pass from Jacolby Criswell (Noah Burnette kick) Drive: 9 plays, 61 yards, 4:19 UNC 17–0

Third quarter

- (8:23) UNC - Noah Burnette 37 yard field goal Drive: 8 plays, 52 yards, 4:26 UNC 20–0
- (5:49) Duke - Star Thomas 29 yard pass from Maalik Murphy (Todd Pelino kick) Drive: 8 plays, 75 yards, 2:34 UNC 20–7

Fourth quarter

- (14:21) Duke - Star Thomas 2 yard rush (Todd Pelino kick) Drive: 11 plays, 85 yards, 4:06 UNC 20–14
- (5:42) Duke - Peyton Jones 20 yard rush (Todd Pelino kick) Drive: 4 plays, 50 yards, 1:49 Duke 21–20

Statistics	UNC	DUKE
First downs	20	20
Total yards	407	394
Rushing yards	156	185
Passing yards	251	209
Passing: Comp–Att–Int	21-39-1	15-34-0
Time of possession	34:06	25:54

Team	Category	Player	Statistics
North Carolina	Passing	Jacolby Criswell	21/39, 251 yards, 2 TD, INT
North Carolina	Rushing	Omarion Hampton	29 carries, 103 yards
North Carolina	Receiving	JJ Jones	5 receptions, 89 yards, TD
Duke	Passing	Maalik Murphy	15/34, 209 yards, TD
Duke	Rushing	Star Thomas	30 carries, 166 yards, TD
Duke	Receiving	Jordan Moore	4 receptions, 80 yards

=== Pittsburgh ===
Game Six – Pittsburgh Panthers (4–0) at North Carolina Tar Heels (3–1) – Game summary

Quarter	1	2	3	4	Total
Panthers	3	14	7	10	34
Tar Heels	7	10	7	0	24

at Kenan Stadium, Chapel Hill, NC

- Date: Saturday October 5, 2024
- Game time: 12:00 p.m.
- Game weather: Sunny • 78 °F (26 °C) • Wind: N 7 miles per hour (11 km/h)
- Game attendance: 46,003
- Referee: Stuart Mullins
- TV announcers (ESPN2): Roy Philpott (play-by-play), Sam Acho (analyst) and Taylor Davis (sideline)
- "UNC-Pitt FB box score" (PDF).

Game information

First quarter

- (11:36) PITT - Ben Sauls 24 yard field goal (Drive: 9 plays, 59 yards, 3:24) PITT 3–0
- (6:44) UNC - Kaleb Cost 84 yard interception return (Noah Burnette kick) UNC 7–3

Second quarter

- (10:20) PITT - Censere Lee 7 yard pass from Eli Holstein (Ben Sauls kick) (Drive: 5 plays, 91 yards, 1:33) PITT 10–7
- (6:57) UNC - Noah Burnette 34 yard field goal (Drive: 10 plays, 58 yards, 3:23) 10–10
- (5:41) PITT - Raphael Williams Jr. 30 yard pass from Eli Holstein (Ben Sauls kick) (Drive: 5 plays, 75 yards, 1:16)) PITT 17–10
- (0:42) UNC - Omarion Hampton 3 yard rush (Noah Burnette kick) (Drive: 10 plays, 73 yards, 2:09) 17–17

Third quarter

- (8:58) PITT - Desmond Reid 2 yard pass from Eli Holstein (Ben Sauls kick) (Drive: 9 plays, 58 yards, 3:03) PITT 24–17
- (2:07) UNC - John Copenhaver 11 yard pass from Jacolby Criswell (Noah Burnette kick) (Drive: 11 plays, 61 yards, 4:20) 24–24

Fourth quarter

- (12:44) PITT - Eli Holstein 3 yard rush (Ben Sauls kick) (Drive: 11 plays, 75 yards, 4:23) PITT 31–24
- (2:01) PITT - Ben Sauls 37 yard field goal (Drive: 18 plays, 73 yards, 7:07) PITT 34–24

Statistics	PITT	UNC
First downs	23	23
Total yards	520	416
Rushing yards	139	147
Passing yards	381	269
Comp-Att-Int	25-42-1	24-45-0
Time of possession	29:19	30:41

Team	Category	Player	Statistics
Pittsburgh	Passing	Eli Holstein	25/42, 381 yards, 3 TD, INT
Pittsburgh	Rushing	Eli Holstein	10 carries, 76 yards, TD
Pittsburgh	Receiving	Desmond Reid	11 receptions, 155 yards, TD
North Carolina	Passing	Jacolby Criswell	24/45, 269 yards, TD
North Carolina	Rushing	Omarion Hampton	23 carries, 106 yards, TD
North Carolina	Receiving	Nate McCollum	10 receptions, 128 yards

=== vs. Georgia Tech ===
Game Seven – Georgia Tech Yellow Jackets (4–2) vs North Carolina Tar Heels (3–3) – Game summary

Quarter	1	2	3	4	Total
Yellow Jackets	7	13	7	14	41
Tar Heels	7	7	10	10	34

at Kenan Stadium, Chapel Hill, North Carolina

- Date: Saturday October 12, 2024
- Game time: 12:00 p.m.
- Game weather: Sunny 68 °F (20 °C) • Wind: W 6 miles per hour (9.7 km/h)
- Game attendance: 44,482
- Referee: Mike Roche
- TV announcers (The CW): Thom Brennaman (play-by-play) and Max Browne (analyst)

Game information

First quarter

- (6:12) GT - Chad Alexander 2 yard rush (Aidan Birr kick) (Drive: 6 plays, 38 yards, 2:50) GT 7–0
- (2:36) UNC - Jacolby Criswell 1 yard rush (Noah Burnette kick) (Drive: 3 plays, 78 yards, 1:00) 7–7

Second quarter

- (7:36) GT - Aidan Birr 26 yard field goal (Drive: 13 plays, 66 yards, 6:26) GT 10–7
- (1:54) GT - Haynes King 20 yard rush (Aidan Birr kick) (Drive: 8 plays, 62 yards, 3:31) GT 17–7
- (0:34) UNC - JJ Jones 4 yard pass from Jacolby Criswell (Noah Burnette kick) (Drive: 4 plays, 75 yards, 1:20) GT 17–14
- (0:03) GT - Aidan Birr 29 yard field goal (Drive: 5 plays, 63 yards, 0:31) GT 20–14

Third quarter

- (6:46) GT - Haynes King 7 yard rush (Aidan Birr kick) (Drive: 8 plays, 67 yards, 4:19) GT 27–14
- (2:47) UNC - Noah Burnette 50 yard field goal (Drive: 9 plays, 28 yards, 3:50) GT 27–17
- (1:10) UNC - Alijah Huzzie 69 yard punt return (Noah Burnette kick) GT 27–24

Fourth quarter

- (11:18) GT - Jamal Haynes 4 yard rush (Aidan Birr kick) (Drive: 10 plays, 75 yards, 4:52) GT 34–24
- (3:27) UNC - Jacolby Criswell 1 yard rush (Noah Burnette kick) (Drive: 13 plays, 68 yards, 5:32) GT 34–31
- (0:44) UNC - Noah Burnette 26 yard field goal (Drive: 9 plays, 56 yards, 1:01) 34–34
- (0:16) GT - Jamal Haynes 68 yard rush (Aidan Birr kick) (Drive: 2 plays, 75 yards, 0:28) GT 41–34

Statistics	GT	UNC
First downs	25	21
Total yards	505	417
Rushing yards	371	201
Passing yards	134	216
Passing: Comp–Att–Int	12-23-0	18-34-0
Time of possession	33:27	26:33

Team	Category	Player	Statistics
Georgia Tech	Passing	Haynes King	11/27, 134 yards
Georgia Tech	Rushing	Jamal Haynes	19 carries, 170 yards, 2 TD
Georgia Tech	Receiving	Luke Harping	2 receptions, 36 yards
North Carolina	Passing	Jacolby Criswell	18/34, 209 yards, TD
North Carolina	Rushing	Omarion Hampton	18 carries, 137 yards
North Carolina	Receiving	JJ Jones	3 receptions, 64 yards, TD

=== at Virginia (South's Oldest Rivalry) ===
Game Eight – North Carolina Tar Heels (3–4) vs Virginia Cavaliers (4–3) – Game summary

Quarter	1	2	3	4	Total
Tar Heels	7	17	14	3	41
Cavaliers	3	3	0	8	14

at Scott Stadium • Charlottesville, Virginia

- Date: Saturday October 26, 2024
- Game time: 12:00 p.m.
- Game weather: Sunny • 75 °F (24 °C) • Wind: W 6 miles per hour (9.7 km/h)
- Game attendance: 44,550
- Referee: Adam Savoie
- TV announcers (The CW): Thom Brennaman (play-by-play) and Max Browne (analyst)

Game information

First quarter

- (8:36) UVA - Will Bettridge 30 yard field goal (Drive: 12 plays, 31 yards, 4:40) UVA 3–0
- (5:23) UNC - JJ Jones 37 yard pass from Jacolby Criswell (Noah Burnette kick) (Drive: 9 plays, 75 yards, 3:13) UNC 7–3

Second quarter

- (7:51) UNC - Noah Burnette 30 yard field goal (Drive: 12 plays, 68 yards, 4:50) UNC 10–3
- (4:02) UVA - Will Bettridge 27 yard field goal (Drive: 11 plays. 65 yards, 3:49) UNC 10–6
- (1:32) UNC - Omarion Hampton 3 yard rush (Noah Burnette kick) (Drive: 7 plays, 75 yards, 2:30) UNC 17–6
- (0:05) UNC - JJ Jones 31 yard pass from Jacolby Criswell (Noah Burnette kick) (Drive: 7 plays, 55 yards, 1:05) UNC 24–6

Third quarter

- (12:07) UNC - Omarion Hampton 8 yard rush (Noah Burnette kick) (Drive: 4 plays, 33 yards, 1:35) UNC 31–6
- (0:17) UNC - Jahvaree Ritzie 84 yard interception return (Noah Burnette kick) UNC 38–6

Fourth quarter

- (10:07) UVA - JR Wilson 68 yard pass from Tony Muskett (Dakota Twitty 2 point pass from Tony Muskett) (Drive: 3 plays, 76 yards, 0:35) UNC 38–14
- (5:05) UNC - Noah Burnette 25 yard field goal (Drive: 8 plays, 39 yards, 5:02) UNC 41–14

Statistics	UNC	UVA
First downs	23	17
Total yards	428	288
Rushing yards	135	7
Passing yards	293	281
Passing: Comp–Att–Int	19-31-0	24-41-2
Time of possession	31:37	28:23

Team	Category	Player	Statistics
North Carolina	Passing	Jacolby Criswell	19/30, 293 yards, 2 TD
North Carolina	Rushing	Omarion Hampton	26 carries, 105 yards, 2 TD
North Carolina	Receiving	JJ Jones	5 receptions, 129 yards, 2 TD
Virginia	Passing	Anthony Colandrea	16/28, 156 yards, 2 INT
Virginia	Rushing	Kobe Pace	7 carries, 24 yards
Virginia	Receiving	JR Wilson	1 reception, 68 yards, TD

=== at Florida State ===
Game Nine – North Carolina Tar Heels (4–4) at Florida State Seminoles (1–7) – Game summary

Quarter	1	2	3	4	Total
Tar Heels	0	14	14	7	35
Seminoles	3	0	8	0	11

at Doak Campbell Stadium • Tallahassee, FL

- Date: Saturday November 2, 2024
- Game time: 3:30 p.m.
- Game weather: Sunny • Temperature: 85 °F (29 °C) • Wind: E 7 miles per hour (11 km/h)
- Game attendance: 55,107
- Referee: Mike Roche
- TV announcers (ACCN): Chris Cotter (play-by-play), Mark Herzlich (analyst) and Coley Harvey (sideline)

Game information

First quarter

- 9:33, FSU – Ryan Fitzgerald 56-yard field goal (Drive: 6 plays, 36 yards, 2:13; Florida State 3-0)

Second quarter

- 13:45, UNC – Omarion Hampton 1-yard run (Noah Burnette kick) (Drive: 9 plays, 54 yards, 4:26; North Carolina 7-3)
- 1:57, UNC – Omarion Hampton 2-yard run (Noah Burnette kick) (Drive: 16 plays, 93 yards, 8:11; North Carolina 14-3)

Third quarter

- 11:48, UNC – Omarion Hampton 31-yard run (Noah Burnette kick) (Drive: 6 plays, 75 yards, 3:12; North Carolina 21-3)
- 6:24, FSU – Ja'Khi Douglas 28-yard pass from Brock Glenn (Lawayne McCoy run for two-point conversion) (Drive: 5 plays, 85 yards, 2:11; North Carolina 21-11)
- 2:50, UNC – Omarion Hampton 1-yard run (Noah Burnette kick (Drive: 7 plays, 75 yards, 3:34; North Carolina 28-11)

Fourth quarter

- 12:19, UNC – Omarion Hampton 49-yard pass from Jacolby Criswell (Noah Burnette kick) (Drive: 3 plays, 49 yards, 1:38; North Carolina 35-11)

Statistics	UNC	FSU
First downs	23	10
Total yards	500	201
Rushing yards	289	42
Passing yards	211	159
Passing: Comp–Att–Int	13–17–0	8–18–2
Time of possession	39:43	20:17

Team	Category	Player	Statistics
North Carolina	Passing	Jacolby Criswell	13/17, 211 yards, TD
North Carolina	Rushing	Omarion Hampton	32 carries, 172 yards, TD
North Carolina	Receiving	Omarion Hampton	3 receptions, 93 yards, TD
Florida State	Passing	Brock Glenn	6/11, 123 yards, TD
Florida State	Rushing	Lawrance Toafili	8 carries, 24 yards
Florida State	Receiving	Malik Benson	1 reception, 50 yards

=== vs. Wake Forest (rivalry) ===
Game Ten – Wake Forest Demon Deacons (4–5) vs North Carolina Tar Heels (5–4) – Game summary

Quarter	1	2	3	4	Total
Demon Deacons	3	0	14	7	24
Tar Heels	0	10	14	7	31

at Kenan Stadium • Chapel Hill, NC

- Date: Saturday November 16, 2024
- Game time: 8:00 p.m.
- Game weather: 0 °F (−18 °C)
- Game attendance: 48,364
- Referee: Riley Johnson
- TV announcers (ACCN): Wes Durham (play-by-play), Tom Luginbill (analyst) and Dana Boyle (sideline)

Game information

First quarter

- (3:21) WFU - Matthew Dennis 33 yard field goal (Drive: 9 plays, 65 yards, 3:49) WFU 3-0

Second quarter

- (12:26) UNC - Jacolby Criswell 4 yard rush (Noah Burnette kick) (Drive: 11 plays, 75 yards, 5:55) UNC 7-3
- (0:01) UNC - Noah Burnette 24 yard field goal (Drive: 7 plays, 56 yards, 1:38) UNC 10-3

Third quarter

- (12:20) WFU - Demond Claiborne 2 yard rush (Matthew Dennis kick) (Drive: 7 plays, 75 yards, 2:40) 10-10
- (9:26) UNC - JJ Jones 15 yard pass from Jacolby Criswell (Noah Burnette kick) (Drive: 6 plays, 75 yards, 2:54) UNC 17-10
- (8:05) UNC - Power Echols 42 yard interception return (Noah Burnette kick) UNC 24-10
- (5:14) WFU - Demond Claiborne 7 yard rush (Matthew Dennis kick) (Drive: 1 play, 7 yards, 0:05) UNC 24-17

Fourth quarter

- (2:26) UNC - Omarion Hampton 6 yard rush (Noah Burnette kick) (Drive: 5 plays, 18 yards, 2:42) UNC 31-17
- (1:15) WFU - Taylor Morin 16 yard passs from Michael Kern (Matthew Dennis kick) (Drive: 9 plays, 75 yards, 1:11) UNC 31-24

Statistics	WAKE	UNC
First downs	19	21
Total yards	354	362
Rushing yards	114	230
Passing yards	240	132
Passing: Comp–Att–Int	24-37-2	14-22-0
Time of possession	24:59	35:01

Team	Category	Player	Statistics
Wake Forest	Passing	Michael Kern	14/23, 172 yards, TD, 2 INT
Wake Forest	Rushing	Demond Claiborne	20 carries, 95 yards, 2 TD
Wake Forest	Receiving	Taylor Morin	4 receptions, 70 yards, TD
North Carolina	Passing	Jacolby Criswell	14/22, 132 yards, TD
North Carolina	Rushing	Omarion Hampton	35 carries, 244 yards, TD
North Carolina	Receiving	J.J. Jones	2 receptions, 35 yards, TD

=== at Boston College ===
Game Eleven – North Carolina Tar Heels (6–4) vs Boston College Eagles (5–5) – Game summary

Quarter	1	2	3	4	Total
Tar Heels	0	7	0	14	21
Eagles	3	21	3	14	41

at Alumni Stadium • Chestnut Hill, MA

- Date: Saturday November 23, 2024
- Game time: 12:00 p.m.
- Game attendance: 37,801
- TV announcers (The CW): Evan Lepler (play-by-play), Steve Smith Sr. (analyst) and Carla Gebhart (sideline)

Game information

First quarter
Second quarter
Third quarter
Fourth quarter

Statistics	UNC	BC
First downs		
Total yards		
Rushing yards		
Passing yards		
Passing: Comp–Att–Int		
Time of possession		

Team	Category	Player	Statistics
North Carolina	Passing		
North Carolina	Rushing		
North Carolina	Receiving		
Boston College	Passing		
Boston College	Rushing		
Boston College	Receiving		

=== vs. NC State (rivalry) ===
Game Twelve – NC State Wolfpack (5–6) vs North Carolina Tar Heels (6–5) – Game summary

Quarter	1	2	3	4	Total
NC State	7	0	6	22	35
North Carolina	0	6	14	10	30

at Kenan Stadium • Chapel Hill, NC

- Date: Saturday November 30, 2024
- Game time: 3:30 p.m.
- Game weather: Sunny, 45 °F (7 °C)
- Game attendance: 50,500
- Referee: Jerry Magallanes
- TV announcers (ACCN): Chris Cotter (play-by-play), Mark Herzlich (analyst) and Coley Harvey (sideline)

Game information

First quarter
Second quarter
Third quarter
Fourth quarter

Statistics	NCST	UNC
First downs	27	17
Total yards	462	468
Rushing yards	220	193
Passing yards	242	275
Passing: Comp–Att–Int	14–20–1	19–34–0
Time of possession	35:45	24:15

Team	Category	Player	Statistics
NC State	Passing	CJ Bailey	14/20, 242 yards, 2 TD, 1 INT
NC State	Rushing	Hollywood Smothers	13 carries, 83 yards, 2 TD
NC State	Receiving	Dacari Collins	3 receptions, 62 yards
North Carolina	Passing	Jacolby Criswell	18/33, 273 yards, 3 TD
North Carolina	Rushing	Omarion Hampton	22 carries, 185 yards, 1 TD
North Carolina	Receiving	Chris Culliver	4 receptions, 78 yards, 1 TD

=== vs. UConn (Fenway Bowl) ===
2024 Wasabi Fenway Bowl
UConn Huskies (8–4) vs North Carolina Tar Heels (6–6) – Game summary

Quarter	1	2	3	4	Total
Huskies	10	14	3	0	27
Tar Heels	7	0	0	7	14

at Fenway Park • Boston, Massachusetts

- Date: Saturday, December 28, 2024
- Game time: 11:00 a.m. EST
- Game weather: Sunny • Temperature: 38 °F (3 °C) • Wind: NE 3
- Game attendance: 27,900
- Referee: Patrick Foy
- TV announcers (ESPN): Chris Cotter (play-by-play), Mark Herzlich (analyst), and Coley Harvey (sideline)
- Recap

Game information
First quarter
- CONN - Freeman, Chris 32 yd field goal, 10:36. Huskies 3–0. Drive: 8 plays, 61 yards, TOP 04:14
- CONN - Bell, Skyler 38 yd pass from Fagnano, Joe (Freeman, Chris kick), 3:45. Huskies 10–0. Drive: 2 plays, 51 yards, TOP 00:31
- UNC - Culliver, Chris 95 yd kickoff return (Osada, Lucas kick), 3:24. Huskies 10–7. Drive: 1 play, 95 yards

Second quarter

- CONN - Honig, Alex 4 yd pass from Fagnano, Joe (Freeman, Chris kick), 14:10. Huskies 17–7. Drive: 11 plays, 79 yards, TOP 04:14
- CONN - Edwards, Cam 2 yd run (Freeman, Chris kick), 0:54. Huskies 24–7. Drive: 14 plays, 56 yards, TOP 05:54

Third quarter

- CONN - Freeman, Chris 24 yd field goal, 7:40. Huskies 27–7. Drive: 11 plays, 40 yards, TOP 04:56

Fourth quarter

- UNC - Copenhaver, John 17 yd pass from Hood, Caleb (Burnette, Noah kick), 6:46. Huskies 27–14. Drive: 8 plays, 96 yards, TOP 04:09

Statistics	CONN	UNC
First downs	20	10
Total yards	361	206
Rushing yards	210	96
Passing yards	151	110
Passing: Comp–Att–Int	16-24-0	11-14-1
Time of possession	34:50	25:10

Team	Category	Player	Statistics
UConn	Passing	Joe Fagnano	16/23, 151 yards, 2 TD
UConn	Rushing	Mel Brown	11 carries, 96 yards
UConn	Receiving	Skyler Bell	3 receptions, 77 yards, TD
North Carolina	Passing	Michael Merdinger	9/12, 86 yards, INT
North Carolina	Rushing	Caleb Hoob	11 carries, 78 yards
North Carolina	Receiving	John Copenhaver	4 receptions, 44 yards, TD
