= 2024 Duke Blue Devils football team =

American college football season

2024 Duke Blue Devils football

Gator Bowl, L 20–52 vs. Ole Miss
- Conference: Atlantic Coast Conference
- Record: 9–4 (5–3 ACC)
- Head coach: Manny Diaz (1st season)
- Offensive coordinator: Jonathan Brewer (1st season)
- Offensive scheme: Spread
- Defensive coordinator: Jonathan Patke (1st season)
- Base defense: Multiple
- Home stadium: Wallace Wade Stadium

2024 Atlantic Coast Conference football standings
	Conf.			Overall
Team	W		L	W		L
No. 12 SMU y^	8	–	0	11	–	3
No. 14 Clemson y$^	7	–	1	10	–	4
No. 18 Miami (FL)	6	–	2	10	–	3
No. 20 Syracuse	5	–	3	10	–	3
Duke	5	–	3	9	–	4
Louisville	5	–	3	9	–	4
Georgia Tech	5	–	3	7	–	6
Boston College	4	–	4	7	–	6
Virginia Tech	4	–	4	6	–	7
Pittsburgh	3	–	5	7	–	6
NC State	3	–	5	6	–	7
North Carolina	3	–	5	6	–	7
Virginia	3	–	5	5	–	7
California	2	–	6	6	–	7
Wake Forest	2	–	6	4	–	8
Stanford	2	–	6	3	–	9
Florida State	1	–	7	2	–	10
Championship: Clemson 34, SMU 31
^ – College Football Playoff participant; $ – Conference champion; y – Championship game participant; Rankings from AP Poll

The 2024 Duke Blue Devils football team represented Duke University during the 2024 NCAA Division I FBS football season as a member of the Atlantic Coast Conference (ACC). The Blue Devils were led by head coach Manny Diaz, coaching his first year as the Blue Devils head coach, and played their home games at Wallace Wade Stadium located in Durham, North Carolina. They defeated Florida State on October 18 for their first ever victory against the Seminoles in football, having lost 22 games against them in ACC play.

== Schedule ==
Date	Time	Opponent	Site	TV	Result	Attendance
August 30	7:30 p.m.	Elon*	Wallace Wade Stadium; Durham, NC	ACCN	W 26–3	18,466
September 6	9:00 p.m.	at Northwestern*	Martin Stadium; Evanston, IL	FS1	W 26–20 ^{2OT}	11,062
September 14	6:00 p.m.	UConn*	Wallace Wade Stadium; Durham, NC	ACCNX/ESPN+	W 26–21	20,174
September 21	4:00 p.m.	at Middle Tennessee*	Johnny "Red" Floyd Stadium; Murfreesboro, TN	ESPNU	W 45–17	15,209
September 28	4:00 p.m.	North Carolina	Wallace Wade Stadium; Durham, NC (Victory Bell)	ESPN2	W 21–20	35,018
October 5	8:00 p.m.	at Georgia Tech	Bobby Dodd Stadium; Atlanta, GA	ACCN	L 14–24	37,287
October 18	7:00 p.m.	Florida State	Wallace Wade Stadium; Durham, NC	ESPN2	W 23–16	30,735
October 26	8:00 p.m.	No. 22 SMU	Wallace Wade Stadium; Durham, NC	ACCN	L 27–28 ^{OT}	30,241
November 2	12:00 p.m.	at No. 5 Miami (FL)	Hard Rock Stadium; Miami Gardens, FL	ABC	L 31–53	60,189
November 9	3:30 p.m.	at NC State	Carter-Finley Stadium; Raleigh, NC (rivalry)	ACCN	W 29–19	56,919
November 23	8:00 p.m.	Virginia Tech	Wallace Wade Stadium; Durham, NC	ACCN	W 31–28	22,462
November 30	12:00 p.m.	at Wake Forest	Allegacy Federal Credit Union Stadium; Winston-Salem, NC (rivalry)	ACCN	W 23–17	24,776
January 2, 2025	8:00 p.m.	vs. No. 14 Ole Miss*	EverBank Stadium; Jacksonville, FL (Gator Bowl)	ESPN	L 20–52	31,290
*Non-conference game; Rankings from AP Poll - Released prior to game; All times are in Eastern time

== Game summaries ==
=== vs. Elon (FCS) ===
Game One – Elon Phoenix (FCS) (0-0) vs Duke Blue Devils (0-0) – Game summary

Quarter	1	2	3	4	Total
Phoenix (FCS)	0	0	0	3	3
Blue Devils	3	7	9	7	26

at Wallace Wade Stadium • Durham, NC

- Date: August 30
- Game time: 7:30 p.m. EDT
- Game attendance: 18,466
- Referee: Gary Patterson
- TV announcers (ACCN): Clay Matvick (play-by-play) and Steve Addazio (analyst)

Game information

First quarter

- (8:09) DUKE - Todd Pelino 32-yard field goal (Drive: 14 plays, 68 yards, 05:28; Duke 3-0)

Second quarter

- (00:57) DUKE - Jaquez Moore 7-yard run (Todd Pelino kick) (Drive: 3 plays, 69 yards, 00:47; Duke 10-0)

Third quarter

- (11:42) DUKE - Todd Pelino 42-yard field goal (Drive: 11 plays, 45 yards, 03:18; Duke 13-0)
- (06:18) DUKE - Jeremiah Hasley 1-yard pass from Maalik Murphy (Drive: 3 plays, 51 yards, 00:52; Duke 19-0)

Fourth quarter

- (04:06) DUKE - Eli Pancol 7-yard pass from Maalik Murphy (Todd Pelino kick) (Drive: 10 plays, 63 yards, 05:45; Duke 26-0)
- (00:14) ELON - Jack Berkowitz 39-yard field goal (Drive: 11 plays, 54 yards, 03:52; Elon 3-26)

Statistics	ELON	DUKE
First downs	11	17
Total yards	140	350
Rushing yards	30	59
Passing yards	110	291
Passing: Comp–Att–Int	16-24-0	26-40-1
Time of possession	33:10	26:50

Team	Category	Player	Statistics
Elon	Passing	Matthew Downing	11/17, 72 yards
Elon	Rushing	Rushawn Baker	10 carries, 36 yards
Elon	Receiving	Jamerien Dalton	3 receptions, 32 yards
Duke	Passing	Maalik Murphy	26/40, 291 yards, 2 TD, INT
Duke	Rushing	Jaquez Moore	10 carries, 24 yards, TD
Duke	Receiving	Jordan Moore	7 receptions, 112 yards

=== at Northwestern ===
Game Two – Duke Blue Devils (1-0) vs Northwestern Wildcats (1-0)

Quarter	1	2	3	4	OT	2OT	Total
Blue Devils	7	0	3	3	7	6	26
Wildcats	3	7	0	3	7	0	20

at Martin Stadium • Evanston, Illinois

- Date: September 6
- Game time: 9:00 PM EDT/6:00 PM PDT
- Game weather: 63 °F (17 °C), cloudy
- Game attendance: 11,062
- Referee: Marcus Woods
- TV announcers (FS1): Connor Onion (play-by-play) and Mark Helfrich (analyst)

Statistics	DUKE	NW
First downs	18	19
Total yards	343	288
Rushing yards	93	132
Passing yards	250	156
Passing: Comp–Att–Int	25-40-1	19-35-1
Time of possession	28:47	31:13

Team	Category	Player	Statistics
Duke	Passing	Maalik Murphy	24/39, 243 yards, 3 TD, INT
Duke	Rushing	Star Thomas	17 carries, 58 yards
Duke	Receiving	Jordan Moore	11 receptions, 121 yards, TD
Northwestern	Passing	Mike Wright	19/35, 156 yards, INT
Northwestern	Rushing	Cam Porter	16 carries, 94 yards
Northwestern	Receiving	A.J. Henning	8 receptions, 52 yards

=== vs UConn ===
Game Three – UConn Huskies (1-1) vs Duke Blue Devils (2-0)

Quarter	1	2	3	4	Total
Huskies	0	7	14	0	21
Blue Devils	7	10	0	9	26

at Wallace Wade Stadium • Durham, North Carolina

- Date: September 14
- Game time: 6:00 PM EDT/3:00 PM PDT
- Game weather: Temperature: 78 °F (26 °C) • Weather: Sunny
- Game attendance: 20,174
- Referee: Stuart Mullins
- TV announcers (ACCNX/ESPN+): Clay Matvick (play-by-play), Steve Addazio (analyst), and Marilyn Payne (sideline)

Game information
First quarter
- DUKE - Moore, Jordan 4 yd pass from Murphy, Maalik (Pelino, Todd kick), 9:34. Blue Devils 7–0. Drive: 9 plays, 92 yards, TOP 03:32

Second quarter

- DUKE - Pelino, Todd 53 yd field goal, 12:10. Blue Devils 10–0. Drive: 4 plays, 4 yards, TOP 00:40
- DUKE - Pancol, Eli 36 yd pass from Murphy, Maalik (Pelino, Todd kick), 8:27. Blue Devils 17–0. Drive: 6 plays, 70 yards, TOP 02:49
- CONN - Hardy, Langston 64 yd interception (Freeman, Chris kick), 3:47. Blue Devils 17–7. Drive: 1 play, 64 yards

Third quarter

- CONN - Edwards, Cam 1 yd run (Freeman, Chris kick), 11:46. Blue Devils 17–14. Drive: 8 plays, 64 yards, TOP 02:21
- CONN - Honig, Alex 13 yd pass from Evers, Nick (Freeman, Chris kick), 8:21. Huskies 21–17. Drive: 5 plays, 75 yards, TOP 02:17

Fourth quarter

- DUKE - Pelino, Todd 47 yd field goal, 14:56. Huskies 21–20. Drive: 10 plays, 13 yards, TOP 03:43
- DUKE - Brown, Que'Sean 20 yd pass from Murphy, Maalik (2PC No Good), 11:49. Blue Devils 26–21. Drive: 7 plays, 56 yards, TOP 02:17

Statistics	CONN	DUKE
First downs	17	22
Total yards	314	409
Rushing yards	179	142
Passing yards	135	267
Passing: Comp–Att–Int	15-31-1	28-43-1
Time of possession	27:01	32:59

Team	Category	Player	Statistics
UConn	Passing	Nick Evers	15/29, 135 yards, TD, INT
UConn	Rushing	Cam Edwards	21 carries, 106 yards, TD
UConn	Receiving	Skyler Bell	7 receptions, 58 yards
Duke	Passing	Maalik Murphy	28/43, 267 yards, 3 TD, INT
Duke	Rushing	Star Thomas	12 carries, 40 yards
Duke	Receiving	Que'Sean Brown	11 receptions, 87 yards, TD

=== at Middle Tennessee ===
Game Four – Duke Blue Devils (3-0) vs Middle Tennessee Blue Raiders (1-2)

Quarter	1	2	3	4	Total
Blue Devils	28	7	3	7	45
Blue Raiders	10	0	7	0	17

at Johnny "Red" Floyd Stadium • Murfreesboro, Tennessee

- Date: September 21
- Game time: 7:00 PM EDT/4:00 PM PDT
- Game attendance: 15,209
- TV announcers (ESPNU): Matt Schumaker (play-by-play) and Dustin Fox (analyst)

Statistics	DUKE	MTSU
First downs	17	18
Total yards	340	295
Rushing yards	124	168
Passing yards	216	127
Passing: Comp–Att–Int	14–21–1	21–35–1
Time of possession	23:45	36:15

Team	Category	Player	Statistics
Duke	Passing	Maalik Murphy	14/21, 216 yards, 3 TD, INT
Duke	Rushing	Star Thomas	17 carries, 111 yards, 2 TD
Duke	Receiving	Nicky Dalmolin	4 receptions, 100 yards, 2 TD
Middle Tennessee	Passing	Nicholas Vattiato	21/33, 127 yards, TD, INT
Middle Tennessee	Rushing	Jaiden Credle	12 carries, 125 yards, TD
Middle Tennessee	Receiving	Holden Willis	3 receptions, 60 yards, TD

=== vs North Carolina (Victory Bell) ===
Game Five – North Carolina Tar Heels (3–1) at Duke Blue Devils (4–0) – Game summary

Quarter	1	2	3	4	Total
Tar Heels	10	7	3	0	20
Blue Devils	0	0	7	14	21

at Wallace Wade Stadium • Durham, NC

- Date: September 28
- Game time: 4:00 p.m. EDT
- Game weather: Sunny • 81 °F (27 °C)
- Game attendance: 35,018
- Referee: Gary Patterson
- TV announcers (ESPN2): Mike Monaco (play-by-play), Kirk Morrison (analyst), and Dawn Davenport (sideline)

Game information

First quarter

- (10:19) UNC - Noah Burnette 40 yard field goal Drive: 6 plays, 33 yards, 1:31 UNC 3–0
- (4:34) UNC - JJ Jones 24 yard pass from Jacolby Criswell (Noah Burnette kick) Drive: 10 plays, 57 yards, 4:04 UNC 10–0

Second quarter

- (5:43) UNC - Bryson Nesbit 10 yard pass from Jacolby Criswell (Noah Burnette kick) Drive: 9 plays, 61 yards, 4:19 UNC 17–0

Third quarter

- (8:23) UNC - Noah Burnette 37 yard field goal Drive: 8 plays, 52 yards, 4:26 UNC 20–0
- (5:49) Duke - Star Thomas 29 yard pass from Maalik Murphy (Todd Pelino kick) Drive: 8 plays, 75 yards, 2:34 UNC 20–7

Fourth quarter

- (14:21) Duke - Star Thomas 2 yard rush (Todd Pelino kick) Drive: 11 plays, 85 yards, 4:06 UNC 20–14
- (5:42) Duke - Peyton Jones 20 yard rush (Todd Pelino kick) Drive: 4 plays, 50 yards, 1:49 Duke 21–20

Statistics	UNC	DUKE
First downs	20	20
Total yards	407	394
Rushing yards	156	185
Passing yards	251	209
Passing: Comp–Att–Int	21-39-1	15-34-0
Time of possession	34:06	25:54

Team	Category	Player	Statistics
North Carolina	Passing	Jacolby Criswell	21/39, 251 yards, 2 TD, INT
North Carolina	Rushing	Omarion Hampton	29 carries, 103 yards
North Carolina	Receiving	J.J. Jones	5 receptions, 89 yards, TD
Duke	Passing	Maalik Murphy	15/34, 209 yards, TD
Duke	Rushing	Star Thomas	30 carries, 166 yards, TD
Duke	Receiving	Jordan Moore	4 receptions, 80 yards

=== at Georgia Tech ===
Game Six – Duke Blue Devils (5–0) vs Georgia Tech Yellow Jackets (3–2) – Game summary

Quarter	1	2	3	4	Total
Blue Devils	0	7	7	0	14
Yellow Jackets	7	3	0	14	24

at Bobby Dodd Stadium, Atlanta, Georgia

- Date: October 5
- Game time: 8:00 p.m. EDT
- Game weather: Clear, 73 °F (23 °C)
- Game attendance: 37,287
- Referee: Jerry Magallanes
- TV announcers (ACCN): Wes Durham (play-by-play), Tom Luginbill (analyst), and Dana Boyle (sideline)

Game information

First quarter

- (8:36) GT – Zach Pyron 2-yard run (Aidan Birr kick) (Drive: 12 plays, 60 yards, 6:16; Georgia Tech 7–0)

Second quarter

- (10:02) GT – Aidan Birr 23-yard field goal (Drive: 13 plays, 62 yards, 5:23; Georgia Tech 10–0)
- (00:26) DUKE – Eli Pancol 20-yard pass from Maalik Murphy (Todd Pelino kick) (Drive: 7 plays, 50 yards, 2:48; Georgia Tech 10–7)

Third quarter

- (2:53) DUKE – Sahmir Hagans 65-yard pass from Maalik Murphy (Todd Pelino kick) (Drive: 1 plays, 65 yards, 0:11; Duke 14–10)

Fourth quarter

- (10:40) GT – Jamal Haynes 3-yard pass from Haynes King (Aidan Birr kick) (Drive: 14 plays, 85 yards, 7:07; Georgia Tech 17–14)
- (6:36) GT – Eric Singleton Jr. 9-yard pass from Haynes King (Aidan Birr kick) (Drive: 7 plays, 70 yards, 3:13; Georgia Tech 24–14)

Statistics	DUKE	GT
First downs	15	25
Total yards	279	412
Rushing yards	74	245
Passing yards	205	167
Passing: Comp–Att–Int	18–31–1	23–31–0
Time of possession	20:33	39:27

Team	Category	Player	Statistics
Duke	Passing	Maalik Murphy	18/31, 205 yards, 2 TD, INT
Duke	Rushing	Star Thomas	14 carries, 48 yards
Duke	Receiving	Sahmir Hagans	1 reception, 65 yards, TD
Georgia Tech	Passing	Haynes King	23/31, 167 yards, 2 TD
Georgia Tech	Rushing	Jamal Haynes	19 carries, 128 yards
Georgia Tech	Receiving	Malik Rutherford	8 receptions, 76 yards

=== vs. Florida State ===
Game Seven – Florida State Seminoles (1–5) at Duke Blue Devils (5–1) – Game summary

Quarter	1	2	3	4	Total
Seminoles	3	3	7	3	16
Blue Devils	7	10	3	3	23

at Wallace Wade Stadium • Durham, NC

- Date: October 18
- Game time: 7:00 p.m. EDT
- Game attendance: 30,735
- Referee: Marcus Woods
- TV announcers (ESPN2): Mike Monaco (play-by-play), Kirk Morrison (analyst), and Dawn Davenport (sideline)

Game information

First quarter

- 10:20, FSU – Ryan Fitzgerald 23-yard field goal (Drive: 6 plays, 46 yards, 3:00; Florida State 3-0)
- 1:38, DUKE – Chandler Rivers 36-yard interception return (Todd Pelino kick) (Drive: 3 plays, 1 yard, 1:15; Duke 7-3)

Second quarter

- 11:43, DUKE – Star Thomas 2-yard run (Todd Pelino kick) (Drive: 10 plays, 36 yards, 4:43; Duke 14-3)
- 10:00, DUKE – Todd Pelino 27-yard field goal (Drive: 4 plays, 1 yard, 1:29; Duke 17-3)
- 1:46, FSU – Ryan Fitzgerald 53-yard field goal (Drive: 9 plays, 21 yards, 3:22; Duke 17-6)

Third quarter

- 14:49, FSU – Samuel Singleton Jr. 95-yard kickoff return (Ryan Fitzgerald kick) (Duke 17-13)
- 9:32, DUKE – Todd Pelino 44-yard field goal (Drive: 10 plays, 48 yards, 5:12; Duke 20-13)

Fourth quarter

- 11:35, FSU – Ryan Fitzgerald 38-yard field goal (Drive: 9 plays, 56 yards, 4:47; Duke 20-16)
- 8:58, DUKE – Todd Pelino 39-yard field goal (Drive: 5 plays, 53 yards, 2:37; Duke 23-16)

Statistics	FSU	DUKE
First downs	16	10
Total yards	291	180
Rushing yards	162	110
Passing yards	129	70
Passing: Comp–Att–Int	12–26–2	12–24–0
Time of possession	29:26	30:34

Team	Category	Player	Statistics
Florida State	Passing	Brock Glenn	9/19, 110 yards, 2 INT
Florida State	Rushing	Kam Davis	14 carries, 63 yards
Florida State	Receiving	Ja'Khi Douglas	4 receptions, 48 yards
Duke	Passing	Maalik Murphy	12/24, 70 yards
Duke	Rushing	Star Thomas	21 carries, 88 yards, 1 TD
Duke	Receiving	Que'Sean Brown	2 receptions, 20 yards

This was Duke first win over the Seminoles in program history. The Blue Devils had lost 22 straight since their first meeting in 1992.

With the win, the Blue Devils clinched bowl eligibility.

=== vs. No. 22 SMU ===
Game Eight – No. 22 SMU Mustangs (6–1) at Duke Blue Devils (6–1) – Game summary

Quarter	1	2	3	4	OT	Total
No. 22 Mustangs	0	14	7	0	7	28
Blue Devils	7	0	6	8	6	27

at Wallace Wade Stadium, Durham, North Carolina

- Date: October 26
- Game time: 7:00 p.m. EDT
- Game weather: Sunny
- Game attendance: 30,241
- Referee: Mike Roche
- TV announcers (ACCN): Wes Durham (play-by-play), Tom Luginbill (analyst), and Dana Boyle (sideline)

Game information

First quarter

- DUKE – Que'Sean Brown 43-yard pass from Maalik Murphy (Todd Pelino kick), 2:38. Blue Devils 7–0. Drive: 9 plays, 95 yards, 3:07.

Second quarter

- SMU – Brashard Smith 1-yard run (Collin Rogers kick), 13:15. Tied 7–7. Drive: 12 plays, 75 yards, 4:23.
- SMU – Kevin Jennings 3-yard run (Collin Rogers kick), 3:56. Mustangs 14–7. Drive: 17 plays, 85 yards, 7:02.

Third quarter

- SMU – Roderick Daniels Jr. 81-yard pass from Kevin Jennings (Collin Rogers kick), 4:58. Mustangs 21–7. Drive: 2 plays, 80 yards, 0:42.
- DUKE – Jordan Moore 12-yard pass from Maalik Murphy (kick failed), 2:11. Mustangs 21–13. Drive: 9 plays, 75 yards, 2:47.

Fourth quarter

- DUKE – Star Thomas 1-yard run (maalik Murphy pass to Eli Pancol), 9:02. Tied 21–21. Drive: 10 plays, 64 yards, 5:46.

Overtime

- SMU – Brashard Smith 24-yard run (Collin Rogers kick). Mustangs 28–21. Drive: 2 plays, 25 yards.
- DUKE – Eli Pancol 25-yard pass from Maalik Murphy (pass failed). Mustangs 28–27. Drive: 1 play, 25 yards.

Statistics	SMU	DUKE
First downs	23	24
Total yards	469	393
Rushing yards	211	98
Passing yards	258	295
Turnovers	6	0
Time of possession	27:28	32:32

Team	Category	Player	Statistics
SMU	Passing	Kevin Jennings	13/24, 258 yards, TD, 3 INT
SMU	Rushing	Brashard Smith	26 carries, 117 yards, 2 TD
SMU	Receiving	Roderick Daniels Jr.	2 receptions, 153 yards, TD
Duke	Passing	Maalik Murphy	27/48, 295 yards, 3 TD
Duke	Rushing	Star Thomas	17 carries, 65 yards, TD
Duke	Receiving	Eli Pancol	11 receptions, 138 yards, TD

=== at No. 5 Miami (FL) ===
Game Nine – Duke Blue Devils (6–2) vs No. 5 Miami Hurricanes (8–0) – Game summary

Quarter	1	2	3	4	Total
Blue Devils	7	14	7	3	31
No. 5 Hurricanes	14	3	15	21	53

at Hard Rock Stadium • Miami Gardens, FL

- Date: November 2
- Game time: 12:00 p.m. EDT
- Game weather: Cloudy • Temperature: 76 °F (24 °C) • Wind: N 5 miles per hour (8.0 km/h)
- Game attendance: 60,189
- Referee: Tim Hedgepath
- TV announcers (ABC): Joe Tessitore (play-by-play), Jesse Palmer (analyst) and Katie George (sideline reporter)

Game information

First quarter

- (11:54) MIA – Xavier Restrepo 34-yard pass from Cam Ward, Andres Borregales kick (Drive: 8 plays, 77 yards, 3:06; Miami 7–0)
- (5:04) MIA – Cam McCormick 4-yard pass from Cam Ward, Andres Borregales kick (Drive: 8 plays, 45 yards, 3:27; Miami 14–0)
- (2:28) DUKE – Peyton Jones 8-yard run, Todd Pelino kick (Drive: 4 plays, 83 yards, 0:55; Miami 14–7)

Second quarter

- (11:15) DUKE – Sahmir Hagans 27-yard pass from Maalik Murphy, Todd Pelino kick (Drive: 8 plays, 77 yards, 4:31; Tied 14–14)
- (4:51) MIA – Andres Borregales 29-yard field goal (Drive: 12 plays, 67 yards, 6:24; Miami 17–14)
- (1:47) DUKE – Peyton Jones 7-yard pass from Maalik Murphy, Todd Pelino kick (Drive: 7 plays, 75 yards, 3:04; Duke 21–17)

Third quarter

- (10:03) DUKE – Jordan Moore 6-yard pass from Maalik Murphy, Todd Pelino kick (Drive: 10 plays, 75 yards, 4:57; Duke 28–17)
- (7:16) MIA – Xavier Restrepo 3-yard pass from Cam Ward, Cam Ward two-point run (Drive: 7 plays, 69 yards, 2:47; Duke 28–25)
- (3:08) MIA – Elija Lofton 2-yard run, Andres Borregales kick (Drive: 7 plays, 38 yards, 3:16; Miami 32–28)

Fourth quarter

- (13:51) DUKE – Todd Pelino 37-yard field goal (Drive: 10 plays, 68 yards, 4:17; Miami 32–31)
- (12:56) MIA – Jacolby George 49-yard pass from Cam Ward, Andres Borregales kick (Drive: 2 plays, 51 yards, 0:55; Miami 39–31)
- (7:36) MIA – Xavier Restrepo 66-yard pass from Cam Ward, Andres Borregales kick (Drive: 2 plays, 68 yards, 0:45; Miami 46–31)
- (5:37) MIA – Mark Fletcher Jr. 1-yard run, Andres Borregales kick (Drive: 3 plays, 30 yards, 1:29; Miami 53–31)

Statistics	DUKE	MIA
First downs	23	26
Total yards	405	526
Rushing yards	80	126
Passing yards	325	400
Passing: Comp–Att–Int	25–41–3	25–41–1
Time of possession	28:08	31:52

Team	Category	Player	Statistics
Duke	Passing	Maalik Murphy	25/41, 325 yards, 3 TD, 3 INT
Duke	Rushing	Peyton Jones	12 carries, 71 yards, TD
Duke	Receiving	Sahmir Hagans	9 receptions, 139 yards, TD
Miami (FL)	Passing	Cam Ward	25/41, 400 yards, 5 TD, INT
Miami (FL)	Rushing	Damien Martinez	11 carries, 86 yards
Miami (FL)	Receiving	Xavier Restrepo	8 receptions, 146 yards, 3 TD

=== at NC State ===
Game Ten – Duke Blue Devils (6–3) vs NC State Wolfpack (5–4) – Game summary

Quarter	1	2	3	4	Total
Blue Devils	12	0	7	10	29
Wolfpack	0	9	3	7	19

at Carter–Finley Stadium • Raleigh, NC

- Date: November 9
- Game time: 3:30 p.m. EST
- TV announcers (ACCN): Chris Cotter (play-by-play), Mark Herzlich (analyst) and Coley Harvey (sideline)

Game information

First quarter
Second quarter
Third quarter
Fourth quarter

Statistics	DUKE	NCST
First downs	16	19
Total yards	276	268
Rushing yards	31	84
Passing yards	245	184
Passing: Comp–Att–Int	22-31-0	16-39-1
Time of possession	29:33	30:27

Team	Category	Player	Statistics
Duke	Passing	Maalik Murphy	22/31, 245 yards, 2 TD
Duke	Rushing	Star Thomas	17 carries, 36 yards
Duke	Receiving	Que'sean Brown	5 receptions, 88 yards
NC State	Passing	C.J. Bailey	16/39, 184 yards, TD, INT
NC State	Rushing	C.J. Bailey	10 carries, 36 yards
NC State	Receiving	Justin Joly	4 receptions, 52 yards

=== vs Virginia Tech ===
Game Eleven – Virginia Tech Hokies (5–5) vs Duke Blue Devils (7–3) – Game summary

Quarter	1	2	3	4	Total
Hokies	7	10	0	11	28
Blue Devils	14	7	10	0	31

at Wallace Wade Stadium • Durham, NC

- Date: November 23
- Game time: 8:00 p.m. EST
- Game weather: Clear
- Game attendance: 22,462
- Referee: Adam Savoie
- TV announcers (ACCN): Wes Durham (play-by-play), Tom Luginbill (analyst) and Dana Boyle (sideline)

Game information

First quarter

- (12:55) DUKE – Eli Pancol 86-yard pass from Maalik Murphy, Todd Pelino kick (Drive: 1 play, 86 yards, 0:10; Duke 7–0)
- (8:40) DUKE – Eli Pancol 77-yard pass from Maalik Murphy, Todd Pelino kick (Drive: 3 plays, 80 yards, 0:52; Duke 14–0)
- (4:28) VT – Ali Jennings 65-yard pass from Collin Schlee, John Love kick (Drive: 2 plays, 85 yards, 1:17; Duke 14–7)

Second quarter

- (12:45) VT – Ayden Greene 21-yard run, John Love kick (Drive: 6 plays, 64 yards, 2:39; Tied 14–14)
- (7:55) VT – John Love 24-yard field goal (Drive: 9 plays, 29 yards, 4:08; Virginia Tech 17–14)
- (5:41) DUKE – Eli Pancol 7-yard pass from Maalik Murphy, Todd Pelino kick (Drive: 5 plays, 75 yards, 2:14; Duke 21–17)

Third quarter

- (11:52) DUKE – Star Thomas 2-yard run, Todd Pelino kick (Drive: 7 plays, 74 yards, 3:03; Duke 28–17)
- (3:24) DUKE – Todd Pelino 42-yard field goal (Drive: 6 plays, 6 yards, 3:02; Duke 31–17)

Fourth quarter

- (13:22) VT – John Love 38-yard field goal (Drive: 10 plays, 54 yards, 5:02; Duke 31–20)
- (9:19) VT – Bhayshul Tuten 29-yard run, William Watson III rush (Drive: 8 plays, 56 yards, 3:03; Duke 31–28)

Statistics	VT	DUKE
First downs	23	12
Total yards	403	396
Rushing yards	190	64
Passing yards	213	332
Passing: Comp–Att–Int	15–32–1	17–35–3
Time of possession	38:26	21:34

Team	Category	Player	Statistics
Virginia Tech	Passing	William "Pop" Watson III	12/25, 146 yards, INT
Virginia Tech	Rushing	Bhayshul Tuten	19 carries, 84 yards, TD
Virginia Tech	Receiving	Ali Jennings	6 receptions, 158 yards, TD
Duke	Passing	Maalik Murphy	17/35, 332 yards, 3 TD, 3 INT
Duke	Rushing	Star Thomas	19 carries, 63 yards, TD
Duke	Receiving	Eli Pancol	5 receptions, 188 yards, 3 TD

=== at Wake Forest ===
Game Twelve – Duke Blue Devils (8–3) vs Wake Forest Demon Deacons (4–7) – Game summary

Quarter	1	2	3	4	Total
Blue Devils	0	3	7	13	23
Demon Deacons	0	10	7	0	17

at Allegacy Federal Credit Union Stadium • Winston-Salem, NC

- Date: November 30
- Game time: 12:00 p.m. EST
- Game attendance: 24,776
- TV announcers (ACCN): Jorge Sedano (play-by-play), Orlando Franklin (analyst) and Morgan Uber (sideline)

Game information

First quarter
Second quarter
Third quarter
Fourth quarter

Statistics	DUKE	WAKE
First downs	18	20
Total yards	333	318
Rushing yards	98	111
Passing yards	235	207
Passing: Comp–Att–Int	26-34-1	22-30-0
Time of possession	24:56	35:04

Team	Category	Player	Statistics
Duke	Passing	Maalik Murphy	26/34, 235 yards, TD
Duke	Rushing	Star Thomas	14 carries, 66 yards, TD
Duke	Receiving	Jordan Moore	5 receptions, 98 yards, TD
Wake Forest	Passing	Hank Bachmeier	22/30, 207 yards, TD
Wake Forest	Rushing	Demond Claiborne	20 carries, 67 yards
Wake Forest	Receiving	Horatio Fields	6 receptions, 84 yards, TD

With the win, Duke repeated as winners in the Battle of the Old North State, its first outright win since 2017 and first sweep since 2013. This was the first year since 2002 where all contests were held.

=== vs No. 14 Ole Miss (Gator Bowl) ===
2025 Gator Bowl
Duke Blue Devils (9–3) vs. No. 14 Ole Miss Rebels (9–3) – Game summary

Quarter	1	2	3	4	Total
Blue Devils	0	7	0	13	20
No. 14 Rebels	14	10	14	14	52

at EverBank Stadium • Jacksonville, Florida

- Date: Thursday, January 2, 2025
- Game time: 7:30 p.m. EST
- Game weather: Cloudy, 49 °F (9 °C)
- Game attendance: 31,290
- Referee: Jeffrey Servinski
- TV announcers (ESPN): Dave Pasch (play-by-play), Dusty Dvoracek (color) and Taylor McGregor (sideline)

Game information

1st Quarter

- (8:07) Ole Miss – Antwane Wells Jr. 32 Yd pass from Jaxson Dart (Caden Davis Kick) (Drive: 4 plays, 68 yards, 1:05; Ole Miss 7–0)
- (2:29) Ole Miss – Ulysses Bentley IV 1 Yd Run (Caden Davis Kick) (Drive: 11 plays, 66 yards, 4:02; Ole Miss 14–0)

2nd Quarter

- (9:43) Ole Miss – Caden Davis 28 Yd Field Goal (Drive: 12 plays, 61 yards, 5:06; Ole Miss 17–0)
- (5:54) Duke – Javon Harvey 16 Yd pass from Henry Belin IV (Todd Pelino Kick) (Drive: 8 plays, 75 yards, 3:49; Ole Miss 17–7)
- (1:52) Ole Miss – Dae'Quan Wright 21 Yd pass from Jaxson Dart (Caden Davis Kick) (Drive: 10 plays, 75 yards, 4:02; Ole Miss 24–7)

3rd Quarter

- (8:18) Ole Miss – Isaiah Hamilton 50 Yd Interception Return (Caden Davis Kick) (Ole Miss 31–7)
- (1:20) Ole Miss – Ulysses Bentley IV 8 Yd Run (Caden Davis Kick) (Drive: 4 plays, 74 yards, 2:02; Ole Miss 38–7)

4th Quarter

- (9:56) Ole Miss – Jordan Watkins 1 Yd pass from Jaxson Dart (Caden Davis Kick) (Drive: 4 plays, 38 yards, 1:41; Ole Miss 45–7)
- (3:43) Duke – Jordan Moore 20 Yd pass from Henry Belin IV (Todd Pelino Kick) (Drive: 11 plays, 75 yards, 6:13; Ole Miss 45–14)
- (1:27) Ole Miss – Jordan Watkins 69 Yd pass from Jaxson Dart (Mike Baker Kick) (Drive: 4 plays, 75 yards, 2:16; Ole Miss 52–14)
- (1:07) Duke – Sahmir Hagans 99 Yd Kickoff Return (Todd Pelino PAT blocked) (Ole Miss 52–20)

Statistics	DUKE	MISS
First downs	17	27
Total yards	280	589
Rushing yards	44	151
Passing yards	236	438
Passing: Comp–Att–Int	25-41-1	28-37-1
Time of possession	30:02	29:58

Team	Category	Player	Statistics
Duke	Passing	Henry Belin IV	25/44, 236 yards, 2 TD, INT
Duke	Rushing	Peyton Jones	8 carries, 18 yards
Duke	Receiving	Jordan Moore	5 receptions, 63 yards, TD
Ole Miss	Passing	Jaxson Dart	27/35, 404 yards, 4 TD
Ole Miss	Rushing	Ulysses Bentley IV	14 carries, 70 yards, 2 TD
Ole Miss	Receiving	Jordan Watkins	7 receptions, 180 yards, 2 TD
