= Jacolby Criswell =

American football player (born 2001)

Profile
- Position: Quarterback

Personal information
- Born: October 16, 2001 (age 25)
- Listed height: 6 ft 1 in (1.85 m)
- Listed weight: 230 lb (104 kg)

Career information
- High school: Morrilton (Morrilton, Arkansas)
- College: North Carolina (2020–2022); Arkansas (2023); North Carolina (2024); East Tennessee State (2025)
- NFL draft: 2026: undrafted

Career history
- Calgary Stampeders (2026)*
- * Offseason or practice squad member only
- Stats at ESPN

Jacolby Criswell (born October 16, 2001) is an American gridiron football quarterback. He previously played for the Calgary Stampeders of the Canadian Football League (CFL). He played college football for the North Carolina Tar Heels, the Arkansas Razorbacks, and the East Tennessee State Buccaneers.

== Early life ==
Criswell attended Morrilton High School in Morrilton, Arkansas. He was rated as a four-star recruit and committed to play college football for the North Carolina Tar Heels.

== College career ==
=== North Carolina ===
As a freshman in 2020, Criswell completed three of four passes for 16 yards and an interception and rushed for 26 yards. In 2021, he played four games and made one start; he completed 13 of 21 passes for 179 yard and a touchdown and rushed for 68 yards and a score. In week 12 of that season, Criswell made his first collegiate start against Wofford, filling in for injured starter Sam Howell. He completed 11 of 19 pass attempts for 125 yards, and ran the ball five times for 66 yards and a touchdown, playing in the first half of the Tar Heels' 34-14 win.

Following Howell's departure for the NFL, Criswell lost the starting quarterback competition to Drake Maye, and again saw limited action in 2022. He went two for six for nine yards and rushed for 39 yards on four carries. Criswell entered the transfer portal following the season.

=== Arkansas ===
Criswell transferred back to his home state of Arkansas, to play for the Arkansas Razorbacks. Again serving as a backup, he completed 17 of 27 passing attempts for 143 yards and three touchdowns, while also adding 44 yards on the ground. After the season, Criswell entered the NCAA transfer portal.

=== North Carolina (second stint) ===
On April 30, 2024, Criswell transferred back to North Carolina after one season at Arkansas. He returned to Chapel Hill during the summer, and joined the quarterback competition with Max Johnson and Conner Harrell. Johnson initially won the starting position before getting injured, moving both Harrell and Criswell up the depth chart.

After backing up Harrell against Charlotte, the two split time the following week against NC Central, with Criswell completing 14 of 23 passes for 161 yards and a touchdown in a win. He was named the starter for the Tar Heels' matchup versus James Madison, throwing for 475 yards and three touchdowns to two interceptions in a 70-50 loss. His 475 passing yards were third most in a single game in program history. Criswell started the next week also, against rivals Duke, going 21 for 39 with 251 passing yards and two touchdowns. He threw a game-sealing interception on the final possession as the Tar Heels fell 21-20.

In his fifth start of the season, Criswell threw for 293 yards and two touchdowns in a 41-14 victory over rivals Virginia, ending a four-game losing streak. The following week, he completed 13 of the 17 passes for 211 yards and a touchdown in a 35-11 win over FSU. On January 15, 2025, Criswell entered the transfer portal.

=== East Tennessee State ===
On January 21, 2025, Criswell transferred to East Tennessee State University.

=== Statistics ===
Season	Team	Games			Passing								Rushing			
Season	Team	GP	GS	Record	Cmp	Att	Pct	Yds	Y/A	TD	Int	Rtg	Att	Yds	Avg	TD
2020	North Carolina	6	0	—	3	4	75.0	16	4.0	0	1	58.6	9	26	2.9	0
2021	North Carolina	4	1	1–0	13	21	61.9	179	8.5	1	0	149.2	7	68	9.7	1
2022	North Carolina	4	0	—	2	6	33.3	9	1.9	0	0	45.9	4	39	9.8	0
2023	Arkansas	4	0	—	17	27	63.0	143	5.3	3	0	144.1	23	44	1.9	0
2024	North Carolina	12	10	3–7	186	320	58.1	2,459	7.7	15	6	134.4	71	103	1.5	3
2025	East Tennessee State	8	4	4–0	85	138	61.6	1,130	8.2	9	2	149.0	56	277	4.9	0
FBS Career		30	11	4–7	221	378	58.5	2,806	7.4	19	7	133.7	114	280	2.5	4
FCS Career		8	4	4–0	85	138	61.6	1,130	8.2	9	2	149.0	56	277	4.9	0

== Professional career ==
On May 5, 2026, Criswell signed with the Calgary Stampeders of the Canadian Football League (CFL).
