= Nick Evers (American football) =

American football player

No. 10 – Missouri Tigers
- Position: Quarterback
- Class: Redshirt Senior

Personal information
- Listed height: 6 ft 3 in (1.91 m)
- Listed weight: 195 lb (88 kg)

Career information
- High school: Flower Mound (Flower Mound, Texas)
- College: Oklahoma (2022); Wisconsin (2023); UConn (2024–2025); Missouri (2026–present)
- Stats at ESPN

Nick Evers is an American college football quarterback for the Missouri Tigers. He previously played for the Oklahoma Sooners, Wisconsin Badgers and UConn Huskies.

== Early life ==
Evers attended Flower Mound High School in Flower Mound, Texas. He was rated as a four-star recruit and received offers from schools such as Auburn, Florida, Louisville, Oklahoma, Ole Miss, and Penn State. Initially, Evers committed to play college football for the Florida Gators. However, he later flipped his commitment to play for the Oklahoma Sooners.

== College career ==
As a freshman in 2022, Evers attempted one pass for the Sooners which was incomplete. After the season, he entered his name into the NCAA transfer portal.

Evers transferred to play for the Wisconsin Badgers. In his lone season with the Badgers in 2023, he did not appear in any games, and once again entered his name into the NCAA transfer portal.

Evers transferred to play for the UConn Huskies.

=== Statistics ===
Season	Team	Games			Passing								Rushing			
Season	Team	GP	GS	Record	Cmp	Att	Pct	Yds	Avg	TD	Int	Rtg	Att	Yds	Avg	TD
2022	Oklahoma	1	0	—	0	1	0.0	0	0.0	0	0	0.0	0	0	0.0	0
2023	Wisconsin	Did not play														
2024	UConn	9	8	5–3	97	180	54.2	918	5.1	5	5	100.3	80	245	3.1	3
2025	UConn	3	0	—	10	15	66.7	105	7.0	1	0	147.5	1	-2	-2.0	0
Career		13	8	5–3	107	196	54.6	1,023	5.2	6	5	103.4	81	243	3.0	3
