= Maalik Murphy =

American football player (born 2004)

No. 6 – Oregon State Beavers
- Position: Quarterback
- Class: Redshirt Senior

Personal information
- Born: February 13, 2004 (age 22)
- Listed height: 6 ft 5 in (1.96 m)
- Listed weight: 239 lb (108 kg)

Career information
- High school: Junípero Serra (Gardena, California)
- College: Texas (2022–2023); Duke (2024); Oregon State (2025–present)
- Stats at ESPN

Maalik Murphy (born February 13, 2004) is an American college football quarterback for the Oregon State Beavers. He has previously played for the Texas Longhorns and Duke Blue Devils.

== Early life ==
Murphy grew up in Inglewood, California and attended Junípero Serra High School in Gardena, California. He became the school's starting quarterback going into his junior season, which was shortened and played in the spring due to COVID-19, and passed for 1,261 yards with nine touchdowns and four interceptions. As a senior, Murphy completed 202-of-321 pass attempts for 2,954 yards with 22 touchdowns and 10 interceptions and also rushed for six touchdowns as Junípero Serra won the 2021 CIF Division 1-A state championship. He suffered a severe ankle injury in the state championship game.

Murphy was rated a four-star recruit and began receiving scholarship offers while he was still a backup. He committed to play college football at Texas over UCLA. He was an Elite 11 invitee.

College recruiting
Name	Hometown	School	Height	Weight	Commit date
Maalik Murphy; QB	Gardena, CA	Junípero Serra High School	6 ft 5 in (1.96 m)	235 lb (107 kg)	Feb 13, 2021
Maalik Murphy; QB	Recruit ratings: Rivals: 247Sports: ESPN: (81)				

== College career ==
=== Texas ===
Murphy joined the Texas Longhorns as an early enrollee in January 2022. He redshirted his true freshman season at Texas while still recovering from his ankle injury and did not appear in any games. Murphy completed 9-of-13 pass attempts for 165 yards and a touchdown in Texas's 2023 spring game. After his spring game performance he received offers to transfer to other programs, but he opted to stay at Texas.

On December 13, 2023, Murphy announced that he would be entering the NCAA transfer portal.

=== Duke ===
On December 22, 2023, Murphy announced that he would be transferring to Duke. He was named the starting quarterback for the 2024 season opener. Murphy threw for 2,933 yards and had 26 touchdown passes, a Duke record. On December 9, 2024, Murphy announced that he would be entering the transfer portal.

=== Oregon State ===
On December 19, 2024, Murphy committed to transfer to Oregon State.

=== Statistics ===
Season	Team	Games			Passing								Rushing			
Season	Team	GP	GS	Record	Cmp	Att	Pct	Yds	Y/A	TD	Int	Rtg	Att	Yds	Avg	TD
2022	Texas	0	0	—	Redshirted (redshirt)											
2023	Texas	7	2	2–0	40	71	56.3	477	6.7	3	3	118.3	1	−18	−18.0	0
2024	Duke	12	12	9–3	254	421	60.3	2,933	7.0	26	12	133.5	19	−79	−4.2	2
2025	Oregon State	10	8	1–7	161	277	58.1	1,805	6.5	9	8	117.8	23	−58	−2.5	1
2026	Oregon State	9	2	1–1	67	87	77.0	828	9.5	5	3	169.0	5	-15	-3.8	0
Career		38	24	13–11	522	856	61.0	6,043	7.1	43	26	130.8	48	-170	−3.6	3
