= Demond Claiborne =

American football player (born 2003)

No. 21 – Minnesota Vikings
- Position: Running back
- Roster status: Injured reserve

Personal information
- Born: October 9, 2003 (age 23); Aylett, Virginia, U.S.
- Listed height: 5 ft 10 in (1.78 m)
- Listed weight: 188 lb (85 kg)

Career information
- High school: King William (King William, Virginia)
- College: Wake Forest (2022–2025)
- NFL draft: 2026: 6th round, 198th overall pick

Career history
- Minnesota Vikings (2026–present)

Awards and highlights
- Second-team All-ACC (2025); Third-team All-ACC (2024)

Career NFL statistics as of Week 8, 2026
- Rushing yards: 13
- Rushing average: 2.2
- Receptions: 2
- Receiving yards: 8
- Stats at Pro Football Reference

Demond Claiborne (born October 9, 2003) is an American professional football running back for the Minnesota Vikings of the National Football League (NFL). He played college football for the Wake Forest Demon Deacons and was selected by the Vikings in the sixth round of the 2026 NFL draft.

== Early life ==
Claiborne was born on October 9, 2003 in Aylett, Virginia. He attended King William High School in King William, Virginia. As a senior, he was named the Metro Player of the Year and Tidewater District Player of the Year and as a sophomore was the Virginia Region 2A Offensive Player of the Year. He committed to Wake Forest University to play college football.

== College career ==
As a freshman at Wake Forest in 2022, Claiborne played in 10 games and had 14 carries for 57 yards. As a sophomore he started two of 10 games, rushing 137 times for 586 yards and five touchdowns. He took over as Wake Forest's starter in 2024, and 1,049 yards on 228 carries and 11 touchdowns. Claiborne returned to Wake Forest as the starter in 2025 where he ran for 907 yards on 179 carries (5.1 YPC), 10 touchdowns and had 140 yards receiving. Awarded the 2025 Associated Press Second Team All-ACC for his performance.

== Professional career ==
Pre-draft measurables
Height	Weight	Arm length	Hand span	Wingspan	40-yard dash	10-yard split	20-yard split	Broad jump
5 ft 9 3/4 in (1.77 m)	188 lb (85 kg)	30 1/8 in (0.77 m)	9 in (0.23 m)	6 ft 0 1/4 in (1.84 m)	4.37 s	1.59 s	2.59 s	10 ft 2 in (3.10 m)
All values from NFL Combine

Claiborne was selected by the Minnesota Vikings in the sixth round with the 198th overall pick of the 2026 NFL draft.

On November 9, he was placed on the Vikings injured reserve list after he suffered a knee injury.
