= Star Thomas =

American football player

Profile
- Position: Running back

Personal information
- Born: October 9, 2001 (age 25)
- Listed height: 5 ft 11 in (1.80 m)
- Listed weight: 200 lb (91 kg)

Career information
- High school: Homer (Homer, Louisiana)
- College: Coffeyville Community College (2020–2021); New Mexico State (2022–2023); Duke (2024); Tennessee (2025)

Career history
- Saskatchewan Roughriders (2026)
- Stats at ESPN

Star'Corius Thomas (born October 9, 2001) is an American professional football running back. He previously played in college for the Coffeyville Red Ravens, New Mexico State Aggies, Duke Blue Devils, and Tennessee Volunteers.

== Early life ==
Thomas attended Homer High School in Homer, Louisiana.

== College career ==
Thomas played two years at Coffeyville Community College, rushing 160 times for 970 yards with 11 touchdowns.

Thomas transferred to New Mexico State University in 2022. Thomas played there for two years, rushing 219 times for 1,171 yards and nine touchdowns. In December 2022, Thomas helped New Mexico State to a win over Bowling Green in the Quick Lane Bowl. In 2023, he was named to the All-Conference USA second team.

In 2024, Thomas transferred to Duke University. After starting the season as a backup, he took over as the starter for the final 10 games and finished with 871 yards on 213 carries with seven touchdowns. After the season, Thomas transferred to the University of Tennessee.

== Professional career ==
Pre-draft measurables
| Height | Weight | Arm length | Hand span | Wingspan | 40-yard dash | 10-yard split | 20-yard split | 20-yard shuttle | Three-cone drill | Vertical jump |
|---|---|---|---|---|---|---|---|---|---|---|
| 5 ft 10 3/4 in (1.80 m) | 200 lb (91 kg) | 31 1/8 in (0.79 m) | 8 3/4 in (0.22 m) | 6 ft 1 1/4 in (1.86 m) | 4.66 s | 1.63 s | 2.75 s | 4.50 s | 7.35 s | 30.0 in (0.76 m) |
All values from Pro Day

On June 24, 2026, Thomas signed with the Saskatchewan Roughriders of the Canadian Football League (CFL). On October 6, he was released.
