= 2025 UConn Huskies football team =

American college football season

2025 UConn Huskies football

Fenway Bowl, L 16–41 vs. Army
- Conference: Independent
- Record: 9–4
- Head coach: Jim L. Mora (4th season; regular season); Gordon Sammis (interim; bowl game)
- Offensive coordinator: Gordon Sammis (2nd season)
- Offensive scheme: Spread
- Defensive coordinator: Matt Brock (2nd season)
- Base defense: 3–3–5
- Home stadium: Pratt & Whitney Stadium at Rentschler Field

2025 NCAA Division I FBS independents football records
	Conf.			Overall
Team	W		L	W		L
No. 10 Notre Dame		–		10	–	2
UConn		–		9	–	4
Rankings from AP Poll

The 2025 UConn Huskies football team represented the University of Connecticut (UConn) as an independent during the 2025 NCAA Division I FBS football season. Led by fourth-year head coach Jim L. Mora, the Huskies played home games at Pratt & Whitney Stadium at Rentschler Field in East Hartford, Connecticut.

UConn reached an agreement in 2020 to play Ohio State at Ohio Stadium in September 2025. That game was canceled in June 2024, with Ohio State agreeing to pay UConn $650,000; UConn was originally scheduled to receive $1.95 million for playing the game.

On November 26, it was announced that Mora had been hired as the head coach for the Colorado State Rams; Mora finished his tenure at UConn with an overall record of 27–23 and three bowl game appearances. Offensive coordinator Gordon Sammis was named interim head coach for the Huskies' bowl game.

The UConn Huskies drew an average home attendance of 30,444, the highest of all American football teams from Connecticut.

== Schedule ==
Date	Time	Opponent	Site	TV	Result	Attendance
August 30	2:00 p.m.	Central Connecticut	Pratt & Whitney Stadium at Rentschler Field; East Hartford, CT	WWAX	W 59–13	37,594
September 6	12:00 p.m.	at Syracuse	JMA Wireless Dome; Syracuse, NY (rivalry)	ACCNX/ESPN+	L 20–27 ^{OT}	39,391
September 13	3:00 p.m.	at Delaware	Delaware Stadium; Newark, DE	ESPN+	L 41–44 ^{OT}	17,862
September 20	3:30 p.m.	Ball State	Pratt & Whitney Stadium at Rentschler Field; East Hartford, CT	CBSSN	W 31–25	25,025
September 27	3:30 p.m.	at Buffalo	University at Buffalo Stadium; Amherst, NY	ESPN+	W 20–17	12,717
October 4	3:30 p.m.	FIU	Pratt & Whitney Stadium at Rentschler Field; East Hartford, CT	CBSSN	W 51–10	27,310
October 18	12:00 p.m.	at Boston College	Alumni Stadium; Chestnut Hill, MA	ACCN	W 38–23	38,917
October 25	3:00 p.m.	at Rice	Rice Stadium; Houston, TX	ESPN+	L 34–37 ^{2OT}	21,122
November 1	12:00 p.m.	UAB	Pratt & Whitney Stadium at Rentschler Field; East Hartford, CT	CBSSN	W 38–19	23,170
November 8	3:30 p.m.	Duke	Pratt & Whitney Stadium at Rentschler Field; East Hartford, CT	CBSSN	W 37–34	38,106
November 15	12:00 p.m.	Air Force	Pratt & Whitney Stadium at Rentschler Field; East Hartford, CT	CBSSN	W 26–16	31,457
November 22	3:00 p.m.	at Florida Atlantic	FAU Stadium; Boca Raton, FL	ESPN+	W 48–45	16,306
December 27	2:15 p.m.	vs. Army	Fenway Park; Boston, MA (Fenway Bowl)	ESPN	L 16–41	22,461
Rankings from AP Poll and CFP Rankings released prior to game; All times are in Eastern time

== Game summaries ==
=== Central Connecticut (FCS) ===
Central Connecticut Blue Devils (FCS) (0–0) at UConn Huskies (0–0) – Game summary

Quarter	1	2	3	4	Total
Blue Devils (FCS)	7	3	3	0	13
Huskies	14	21	10	14	59

at Rentschler Field • East Hartford, CT

- Date: August 30
- Game time: 2:03 PM EDT
- Game weather: Sunny • Temperature: 73 °F (23 °C) • Wind: NW at 8 miles per hour (13 km/h)
- Game attendance: 37,594
- Referee: Jerry Magallanes
- TV announcers (WWAX/UConn+): Randy Brochu (play-by-play), Marc Robbins (analyst), Joe Zone (sideline)
- Box Score

Game information

First quarter

- CCSU - Elijah Howard 2-yard run (Jack Hennessey kick), 12:54. Blue Devils 7–0. Drive: 2 plays, 5 yards, 00:43.
- CONN - Skyler Bell 80-yard pass from Joe Fagnano (Chris Freeman kick), 10:15. TIED 7–7. Drive: 6 plays, 88 yards, 02:30.
- CONN - Skyler Bell 12-yard pass from Joe Fagnano (Chris Freeman kick), 1:05. Huskies 14–7. Drive: 10 plays, 92 yards, 04:04.

Second quarter

- CONN - Cam Edwards 73-yard run (Chris Freeman kick), 11:24. Huskies 21–7. Drive: 1 plays, 73 yards, 00:13.
- CONN - Joe Fagnano 4-yard run (Chris Freeman kick), 8:21. Huskies 28–7. Drive: 5 plays, 50 yards, 02:20.
- CCSU - Jack Hennessey 20-yard field goal, 3:20. Huskies 28–10. Drive: 10 plays, 72 yards, 05:01.
- CONN - Reymello Murphy 3-yard pass from Joe Fagnano (Chris Freeman kick), 0:34. Huskies 35–10. Drive: 7 plays, 52 yards, 00:54.

Third quarter

- CONN - Victor Rosa 20-yard run (Chris Freeman kick), 12:33. Huskies 42–10. Drive: 4 plays, 60 yards, 01:39.
- CCSU - Jack Hennessey 29-yard field goal, 7:02. Huskies 42–13. Drive: 12 plays, 63 yards, 05:31.
- CONN - Chris Freeman 29-yard field goal, 3:43. Huskies 45–13. Drive: 8 plays, 62 yards, 03:15.

Fourth quarter

- CONN - Jackson Harper 19-yard pass from Nick Evers (Chris Freeman kick), 13:02. Huskies 52–13. Drive: 9 plays, 55 yards, 03:54.
- CONN - MJ Flowers 16-yard run (Chris Freeman kick), 2:38. Huskies 59–13. Drive: 10 plays, 80 yards, 03:21.

Statistics	CCSU	CONN
First downs	13	26
Plays–yards	63–257	71–638
Rushes–yards	40–128	33–250
Passing yards	129	388
Passing: Comp–Att–Int	9–23–0	27–38–0
Turnovers	0	0
Time of possession	32:32	27:28

Team	Category	Player	Statistics
Central Connecticut	Passing	Brady Olson	8/19, 118 yards
Central Connecticut	Rushing	Elijah Howard	11 carries, 59 yards, TD
Central Connecticut	Receiving	David Pardo	2 receptions, 64 yards
Central Connecticut	Defense	Eric Jackson	7 tackles
UConn	Passing	Joe Fagnano	18/25, 260 yards, 3 TD
UConn	Rushing	Cam Edwards	6 carries, 115 yards, TD
UConn	Receiving	Skyler Bell	4 receptions, 135 yards, 2 TD
UConn	Defense	Tyquan King	8 tackles

=== at Syracuse (rivalry) ===
UConn Huskies (1–0) at Syracuse Orange (0–1) – Game summary

Quarter	1	2	3	4	OT	Total
Huskies	0	14	3	3	0	20
Orange	0	6	0	14	7	27

at JMA Wireless Dome • Syracuse, NY

- Date: September 6
- Game time: 12:02 PM EDT
- Game weather: Indoors
- Game attendance: 39,391
- Referee: Gary Patterson
- TV announcers (ACCNX/ESPN+): Bill Spaulding (play-by-play) and Craig Haubert (analyst)
- Box Score

Game information

First quarter

- No scoring plays.

Second quarter

- CONN – Alex Honig 15-yard pass from John Neider (Chris Freeman kick), 14:55. Huskies 7–0. Drive: 10 plays, 60 yards, 04:56.
- SYR – Tripp Woody 38-yard field goal, 3:37. Huskies 7–3. Drive: 4 plays, −1 yards, 00:55.
- CONN – Mel Brown 45-yard run (Chris Freeman kick), 1:02. Huskies 14–3. Drive: 6 plays, 77 yards, 02:29.
- SYR – Tripp Woody 32-yard field goal, 0:00. Huskies 14–6. Drive: 8 plays, 61 yards, 01:02.

Third quarter

- CONN – Chris Freeman 35-yard field goal, 9:55. Huskies 17–6. Drive: 10 plays, 73 yards, 05:02.

Fourth quarter

- SYR – Justus Ross-Simmons 53-yard pass from Steve Angeli (pass failed), 5:41. Huskies 17–12. Drive: 7 plays, 90 yards, 01:34.
- SYR – Yasin Willis 3-yard run (Darrell Gill Jr.–Steve Angeli pass), 0:48. Orange 20–17. Drive: 10 plays, 80 yards, 01:18.
- CONN – Chris Freeman 41-yard field goal, 0:01. Tied 20–20. Drive: 8 plays, 52 yards, 00:47.

Overtime

- SYR – Justus Ross-Simmons 6-yard pass from Steve Angeli (Tripp Woody kick). Orange 27–20. Drive: 5 plays, 25 yards.

Statistics	CONN	SYR
First downs	20	24
Plays–yards	82–461	78–416
Rushes–yards	28–45	34–142
Passing yards	274	417
Passing: Comp–Att–Int	25–44–0	33–53–1
Turnovers	0	2
Time of possession	33:34	26:26

Team	Category	Player	Statistics
UConn	Passing	Joe Fagnano	24/43, 259 yards
UConn	Rushing	Cam Edwards	21 carries, 75 yards
UConn	Receiving	Skyler Bell	11 receptions, 105 yards
UConn	Defense	Oumar Diomande	9 tackles, 1 sack
Syracuse	Passing	Steve Angeli	33/53, 417 yards, 2 TD
Syracuse	Rushing	Yasin Willis	11 carries, 48 yards, TD
Syracuse	Receiving	Dan Villari	7 receptions, 104 yards
Syracuse	Defense	Duce Chestnut	8 tackles

=== at Delaware ===
UConn Huskies (1–1) at Delaware Fightin' Blue Hens (1–1) – Game summary

Quarter	1	2	3	4	OT	Total
Huskies	10	14	7	7	3	41
Fightin' Blue Hens	14	14	7	3	6	44

at Delaware Stadium • Newark, DE

- Date: September 13
- Game time: 3:02 PM EDT
- Game weather: Sunny • Temperature: 81 °F (27 °C)
- Game attendance: 17,862
- Referee: Rodney Burnette
- TV announcers (ESPN+): Scott Klatzkin (play-by-play) and Fritz Stueber (analyst)
- Box Score

Game information

First quarter

- DEL - Nick Minicucci 3-yard run (Nate Reed kick), 11:13. Fightin' Blue Hens 7–0. Drive: 7 plays, 73 yards, 02:34.
- CONN - Cam Edwards 51-yard run (Chris Freeman kick), 8:48. Tied 7–7. Drive: 6 plays, 75 yards, 02:25.
- DEL - Jo Silver 70-yard run (Nate Reed kick), 8:06. Fightin' Blue Hens 14–7. Drive: 2 plays, 75 yards, 00:42.
- CONN - Chris Freeman 28-yard field goal, 4:48. Fightin' Blue Hens 14–10. Drive: 8 plays, 65 yards, 03:18.

Second quarter

- DEL - Nick Minicucci 5-yard run (Nate Reed kick), 12:54. Fightin' Blue Hens 21–10. Drive: 12 plays, 79 yards, 06:47.
- CONN - Victor Rosa 31-yard run (Chris Freeman kick), 10:08. Fightin' Blue Hens 21–17. Drive: 7 plays, 73 yards, 02:37.
- CONN - Cam Edwards 2-yard run (Chris Freeman kick), 7:17. Huskies 24–21. Drive: 7 plays, 83 yards, 01:23.
- DEL - Kyre Duplessis 68-yard pass from Nick Minicucci (Nate Reed kick), 5:55. Fightin' Blue Hens 28–24. Drive: 3 plays, 75 yards, 01:22.

Third quarter

- CONN - Reymello Murphy 10-yard pass from Joe Fagnano (Chris Freeman kick), 5:05. Huskies 31–28. Drive: 7 plays, 79 yards, 02:47.
- DEL - Jo Silver 18-yard run (Nate Reed kick), 0:00. Fightin' Blue Hens 35–31. Drive: 11 plays, 75 yards, 05:05.

Fourth quarter

- CONN - Alex Honig 1-yard pass from Joe Fagnano (Chris Freeman kick), 9:54. Huskies 38–35. Drive: 10 plays, 75 yards, 05:06.
- DEL - Nate Reed 43-yard field goal, 0:00. Tied 38–38. Drive: 11 plays, 52 yards, 02:10.

Overtime

- CONN - Chris Freeman 24-yard field goal. Huskies 41–38. Drive: 6 plays, 19 yards.
- DEL - Nick Minicucci 13-yard run. Fightin' Blue Hens 44–41. Drive: 4 plays, 25 yards.

Statistics	CONN	DEL
First downs	29	29
Plays–yards	71–521	79–512
Rushes–yards	32–175	45–247
Passing yards	346	265
Passing: Comp–Att–Int	28-39-0	23-34-0
Turnovers	0	0
Time of possession	27:35	32:25

Team	Category	Player	Statistics
UConn	Passing	Joe Fagnano	28/38, 346 yards, 2 TD
UConn	Rushing	Cam Edwards	23 carries, 116 yards, 2 TD
UConn	Receiving	Skyler Bell	7 receptions, 92 yards
UConn	Defense	Bryun Parham	10 tackles, 3 sacks
Delaware	Passing	Nick Minicucci	23/34, 265 yards, TD
Delaware	Rushing	Jo Silver	15 carries, 179 yards, 2 TD
Delaware	Receiving	Kyre Duplessis	9 receptions, 161 yards, TD
Delaware	Defense	KT Seay	13 tackles

=== Ball State ===
Ball State Cardinals (1–2) vs. UConn Huskies (1–2) – Game summary

Quarter	1	2	3	4	Total
Cardinals	0	7	3	15	25
Huskies	10	0	7	14	31

at Rentschler Field • East Hartford, CT

- Date: September 20
- Game time: 3:32 PM EDT
- Game weather: Sunny • Temperature: 71 °F (22 °C) • Wind: N at 5 miles per hour (8.0 km/h)
- Game attendance: 25,025
- Referee: Garrett Dickerson
- TV announcers (CBSSN): Fran Charles (play-by-play), Taylor McHargue (analyst) & Hailey Sutton (sideline)

Game information

First quarter

- CONN - Chris Freeman 30-yard field goal, 9:48. Huskies 3–0. Drive: 4 plays, 7 yards, 01:47.
- CONN - Skyler Bell 2-yard pass from Joe Fagnano (Chris Freeman kick), 2:30. Huskies 10–0. Drive: 10 plays, 85 yards, 05:36.

Second quarter

- BALL - Kiael Kelly 19-yard pass from Qian Magwood (Carson Holmer kick), 14:53. Huskies 10–7. Drive: 6 plays, 83 yards, 02:32.

Third quarter

- CONN - Terrence Smith 1-yard run (Chris Freeman kick), 6:04. Huskies 17–7. Drive: 14 plays, 60 yards, 05:45.
- BALL - Carson Holmer 23-yard field goal, 0:37. Huskies 17–10. Drive: 11 plays, 69 yards, 05:27.

Fourth quarter

- CONN - Cam Edwards 32-yard run (Chris Freeman kick), 10:24. Huskies 24–10. Drive: 10 plays, 67 yards, 05:09.
- BALL - Qua Ashley 1-yard run (Carson Holmer kick), 3:28. Huskies 24–17. Drive: 8 plays, 65 yards, 03:10.
- CONN - Cam Edwards 67-yard run (Chris Freeman kick), 1:50. Huskies 31–17. Drive: 3 plays, 68 yards, 01:35.
- BALL - Dahya Patel 11-yard pass from Kiael Kelly (Kiael Kelly–Koby Gross pass), 0:09. Huskies 31–25. Drive: 6 plays, 65 yards, 01:30.

Statistics	BALL	CONN
First downs	19	17
Plays–yards	62–404	67–398
Rushes–yards	37–176	37–217
Passing yards	228	181
Passing: Comp–Att–Int	18-25-1	20-30-0
Turnovers	1	0
Time of possession	27:44	32:16

Team	Category	Player	Statistics
Ball State	Passing	Kiael Kelly	17/24, 209 yards, TD
Ball State	Rushing	Qua Ashley	18 carries, 86 yards, TD
Ball State	Receiving	Donovan Hamilton	7 receptions, 61 yards
Ball State	Defense	Alfred Chea	8 tackles
UConn	Passing	Joe Fagnano	20/30, 181 yards, TD
UConn	Rushing	Cam Edwards	24 carries, 194 yards, 2 TD
UConn	Receiving	Skyler Bell	14 receptions, 113 yards, TD
UConn	Defense	Bryun Parham	11 tackles, 0.5 sacks

=== at Buffalo ===
UConn Huskies (2–2) at Buffalo Bulls (2–2) – Game summary

Quarter	1	2	3	4	Total
Huskies	0	7	10	3	20
Bulls	0	7	3	7	17

at University at Buffalo Stadium • Amherst, NY

- Date: September 27
- Game time: 3:30 p.m. EDT
- Game weather: Sunny • Temperature: 76 °F (24 °C) • Wind: NE at 7 miles per hour (11 km/h)
- Game attendance: 12,717
- Referee: Matt Packowski
- TV announcers (ESPN+): James Westling (play-by-play) and Craig Haubert (analyst)
- Box Score

Game information

First quarter

- No scoring plays.

Second quarter

- CONN - Skyler Bell 25-yard pass from Joe Fagnano (Chris Freeman kick), 8:36. Huskies 7–0. Drive: 10 plays, 93 yards, 05:12.
- BUFF - Lamar Sperling 63-yard run (Jack Howes kick), 6:21. Tied 7–7. Drive: 5 plays, 75 yards, 02:15.

Third quarter

- CONN - Cam Edwards 8-yard run (Chris Freeman kick), 11:16. Huskies 14–7. Drive: 8 plays, 75 yards, 03:36.
- BUFF - Jack Howes 39-yard field goal, 4:58. Huskies 14–10. Drive: 12 plays, 54 yards, 06:18.
- CONN - Chris Freeman 39-yard field goal, 1:31. Huskies 17–10. Drive: 9 plays, 49 yards, 03:21.

Fourth quarter

- BUFF - Al-Jay Henderson 5-yard pass from Gunnar Gray (Jack Howes kick), 0:59. Tied 17–17. Drive: 9 plays, 57 yards, 02:53.
- CONN - Chris Freeman 44-yard field goal, 0:06. Huskies 20–17. Drive: 10 plays, 49 yards, 00:53.

Statistics	CONN	BUFF
First downs	17	17
Plays–yards	63–320	71–329
Rushes–yards	31–165	42–204
Passing yards	155	125
Passing: Comp–Att–Int	19-32-0	17-29-0
Turnovers	0	0
Time of possession	26:10	33:50

Team	Category	Player	Statistics
UConn	Passing	Joe Fagnano	19/31, 155 yards, TD
UConn	Rushing	Joe Fagnano	6 carries, 64 yards
UConn	Receiving	Skyler Bell	6 receptions, 54 yards, TD
UConn	Defense	Oumar Diomande	10 tackles
Buffalo	Passing	Gunnar Gray	17/29, 125 yards, 1 TD
Buffalo	Rushing	Lamar Sperling	9 carries, 106 yards, TD
Buffalo	Receiving	Victor Snow	7 receptions, 68 yards
Buffalo	Defense	Red Murdock	9 tackles, FF

=== FIU ===
FIU Panthers (2–2) vs. UConn Huskies (3–2) – Game summary

Quarter	1	2	3	4	Total
Panthers	0	3	0	7	10
Huskies	14	13	17	7	51

at Rentschler Field • East Hartford, CT

- Date: October 4
- Game time: 3:33 PM EDT
- Game weather: Sunny • Temperature: 80 °F (27 °C) • Wind: NW at 3 miles per hour (4.8 km/h)
- Game attendance: 27,310
- Referee: Garrett Dickerson
- TV announcers (CBSSN): Alex Del Barrio (play-by-play), Logan Ryan (analyst) and Hailey Sutton (sideline)
- Box Score

Game information

First quarter

- CONN - Skyler Bell 18-yard pass from Joe Fagnano (Chris Freeman kick), 7:38. Huskies 7–0. Drive: 11 plays, 69 yards, 05:14.
- CONN - Cam Edwards 1-yard run (Chris Freeman kick), 2:08. Huskies 14–0. Drive: 4 plays, 65 yards, 01:09.

Second quarter

- CONN - Chris Freeman 43-yard field goal, 10:55. Huskies 17–0. Drive: 7 plays, 23 yards, 04:00.
- FIU - Noah Grant 26-yard field goal, 6:05. Huskies 17–3. Drive: 10 plays, 67 yards, 04:50.
- CONN - Reymello Murphy 61-yard pass from Joe Fagnano (Chris Freeman kick), 0:55. Huskies 24–3. Drive: 2 plays, 55 yards, 00:30.
- CONN - Chris Freeman 36-yard field goal, 0:21. Huskies 27–3. Drive: 5 plays, 22 yards, 00:27.

Third Quarter

- CONN - Victor Rosa 65-yard pass from Joe Fagnano (Chris Freeman kick), 13:22. Huskies 34–3. Drive: 3 plays, 70 yards, 01:36.
- CONN - Chris Freeman 28-yard field goal, 6:46. Huskies 37–3. Drive: 12 plays, 81 yards, 04:52.
- CONN - Skyler Bell 8-yard pass from Joe Fagnano (Chris Freeman kick), 2:56. Huskies 44–3. Drive: 5 plays, 62 yards, 02:21.

Fourth Quarter

- CONN - Oliver Lundberg Coleman 1-yard run (Chris Freeman kick), 9:48. Huskies 51–3. Drive: 3 plays, 2 yards, 01:18.
- FIU - Kejon Owens 2-yard run (Noah Grant kick), 5:46. Huskies 51–10. Drive: 9 plays, 69 yards, 03:59.

Statistics	FIU	CONN
First downs	18	22
Plays–yards	72–304	67–527
Rushes–yards	36–130	33–150
Passing yards	174	377
Passing: Comp–Att–Int	22-36-3	24-34-0
Turnovers	5	1
Time of possession	30:27	29:33

Team	Category	Player	Statistics
FIU	Passing	Joe Pesansky	7/12, 100 yards
FIU	Rushing	Kejon Owens	16 carries, 67 yards, TD
FIU	Receiving	Alex Perry	4 receptions, 32 yards
FIU	Defense	Victor Evans III	8 tackles
UConn	Passing	Joe Fagnano	22/28, 355 yards, 4 TD
UConn	Rushing	Cam Edwards	12 carries, 80 yards, TD
UConn	Receiving	Reymello Murphy	3 receptions, 78 yards, TD
UConn	Defense	Amir Renwick	10 tackles, 1 sack, 1 INT

=== at Boston College ===
UConn Huskies (4–2) at Boston College Eagles (1–5) – Game summary

Quarter	1	2	3	4	Total
Huskies	7	10	14	7	38
Eagles	6	14	0	3	23

at Alumni Stadium • Chestnut Hill, MA

- Date: October 18
- Game time: 12:03 p.m. EDT
- Game weather: Sunny • Temperature: 58 °F (14 °C)
- Game attendance: 38,917
- Referee: Nate Black
- TV announcers (ACCN): Jorge Sedano (play-by-play), Rodney McLeod (analyst) & Victoria Arlen (sideline)
- Box Score

Game information

First quarter

- BC - Luca Lombardo 47-yard field goal, 9:13. Eagles 3–0. Drive: 12 plays, 46 yards, 05:47.
- CONN - Juice Vereen 50-yard pass from Joe Fagnano (Chris Freeman kick), 6:06. Huskies 7–3. Drive: 6 plays, 75 yards, 03:07.
- BC - Luca Lombardo 22-yard field goal, 0:35. Huskies 7–6. Drive: 13 plays, 67 yards, 05:24.

Second quarter

- CONN - Joe Fagnano 2-yard run (Chris Freeman kick), 11:41. Huskies 14–6. Drive: 9 plays, 80 yards, 03:47.
- BC - Kaelan Chudzinski 9-yard pass from Grayson James (Luca Lombardo kick), 7:31. Huskies 14–13. Drive: 10 plays, 75 yards, 04:10.
- CONN - Chris Freeman 40-yard field goal, 5:52. Huskies 17–13. Drive: 5 plays, 38 yards, 01:39.
- BC - Reed Harris 39-yard pass from Grayson James (Luca Lombardo kick), 0:21. Eagles 20–17. Drive: 7 plays, 62 yards, 01:17.

Third quarter

- CONN - John Neider 43-yard pass from Joe Fagnano (Chris Freeman kick), 11:51. Huskies 24–20. Drive: 6 plays, 75 yards, 03:09.
- CONN - Juice Vereen 14-yard pass from Joe Fagnano (Chris Freeman kick), 0:49. Huskies 31–20. Drive: 5 plays, 45 yards, 02:16.

Fourth quarter

- BC - Luca Lombardo 25-yard field goal, 10:40. Huskies 31–23. Drive: 14 plays, 78 yards, 05:03.
- CONN - Skyler Bell 38-yard pass from Joe Fagnano (Chris Freeman kick), 5:04. Huskies 38–23. Drive: 5 plays, 55 yards, 02:05.

Statistics	CONN	BC
First downs	20	24
Plays–yards	58–455	77–395
Rushes–yards	27–93	49–191
Passing yards	362	204
Passing: comp–att–int	23–31–0	16–28–0
Turnovers	0	0
Time of possession	27:52	32:08

Team	Category	Player	Statistics
UConn	Passing	Joe Fagnano	23/31, 362 yards, 4 TD
UConn	Rushing	Cam Edwards	12 carries, 57 yards
UConn	Receiving	Skyler Bell	10 receptions, 125 yards, TD
UConn	Defense	Bryun Parham	14 tackles, 2 sacks
Boston College	Passing	Grayson James	16/28, 204 yards, 2 TD
Boston College	Rushing	Jordan McDonald	24 carries, 123 yards
Boston College	Receiving	Lewis Bond	5 receptions, 69 yards
Boston College	Defense	Omar Thornton	10 tackles

=== at Rice ===
UConn Huskies (5–2) at Rice Owls (3–4) – Game summary

Quarter	1	2	3	4	OT	2OT	Total
Huskies	7	14	3	0	7	3	34
Owls	3	14	0	7	7	6	37

at Rice Stadium • Houston, TX

- Date: October 25
- Game time: 3:02 p.m. EDT
- Game weather: Cloudy • Temperature: 77 °F (25 °C) • Wind: SE at 7 miles per hour (11 km/h)
- Game attendance: 21,122
- Referee: Tim Rich
- TV announcers (ESPN+): Ted Emrich (play-by-play), Charles Arbuckle (analyst), Smacker Miles (sideline)
- Box Score

Game information

First quarter

- CONN - Skyler Bell 80-yard pass from Joe Fagnano (Chris Freeman kick), 11:05. Huskies 7–0. Drive: 1 plays, 80 yards, 00:13.
- RICE - Enock Gota 38-yard field goal, 1:03. Huskies 7–3. Drive: 10 plays, 52 yards, 05:00.

Second quarter

- RICE - Quinton Jackson 73-yard run (Enock Gota kick), 11:08. Owls 10–7. Drive: 3 plays, 80 yards, 01:21.
- CONN - Cam Edwards 12-yard pass from Joe Fagnano (Chris Freeman kick), 1:48. Huskies 14–10. Drive: 13 plays, 77 yards, 04:45.
- RICE - Quinton Jackson 75-yard pass from Chase Jenkins (Enock Gota kick), 1:35. Owls 17–14. Drive: 1 plays, 75 yards, 00:13.
- CONN - Vereen, Juice 34-yard pass from Joe Fagnano (Chris Freeman kick), 0:49. Huskies 21–17. Drive: 6 plays, 75 yards, 00:46.

Third quarter

- CONN - Chris Freeman 45-yard field goal, 6:06. Huskies 24–17. Drive: 5 plays, 18 yards, 02:16.

Fourth quarter

- RICE - D'Andre Hardemann 10-yard run (Enock Gota kick), 11:46. Tied 24–24. Drive: 12 plays, 91 yards, 05:40.

First overtime

- RICE - Quinton Jackson 6-yard run (Enock Gota kick). Owls 31–24. Drive: 5 plays, 25 yards.
- CONN - Cam Edwards 5-yard run (Chris Freeman kick). Tied 31–31. Drive: 3 plays, 25 yards.

Second overtime

- CONN - Chris Freeman 41-yard field goal. Huskies 34–31. Drive: 4 plays, 3 yards.
- RICE - Quinton Jackson 23-yard run (No PAT Attempted). Owls 37–34. Drive: 2 plays, 25 yards.

Statistics	CONN	RICE
First downs	18	20
Plays–yards	74–449	78–491
Rushes–yards	26–105	56–300
Passing yards	344	191
Passing: comp–att–int	32–48–0	17–22–0
Turnovers	0	0
Time of possession	27:32	32:28

Team	Category	Player	Statistics
UConn	Passing	Joe Fagnano	32/48, 344 yards, 3 TD
UConn	Rushing	Cam Edwards	16 carries, 59 yards, TD
UConn	Receiving	Skyler Bell	8 receptions, 158 yards, TD
UConn	Defense	Bryun Parham	15 tackles
Rice	Passing	Chase Jenkins	17/22, 191 yards, TD
Rice	Rushing	Quinton Jackson	21 carries, 168 yards, 3 TD
Rice	Receiving	Quinton Jackson	3 receptions, 80 yards, TD
Rice	Defense	Tony Anyanwu	9 tackles

=== UAB ===
UAB Blazers (3–4) at UConn Huskies (5–3) – Game summary

Quarter	1	2	3	4	Total
Blazers	0	0	6	13	19
Huskies	7	17	14	0	38

at Rentschler Field • East Hartford, CT

- Date: November 1
- Game time: 12:06 PM EDT
- Game weather: Sunny • Temperature: 54 °F (12 °C) • Wind: NW at 11 miles per hour (18 km/h)
- Game attendance: 23,170
- Referee: Steven Anderson
- TV announcers (CBSSN): Fran Charles (play-by-play), Taylor McHargue (analyst) & Hailey Sutton (sideline)
- Box Score

Game information

First quarter

- CONN - Skyler Bell 26-yard pass from Joe Fagnano (Chris Freeman kick), 1:04. Huskies 7–0. Drive: 9 plays, 83 yards, 04:09.

Second quarter

- CONN - Cam Edwards 1-yard run (Chris Freeman kick), 10:45. Huskies 14–0. Drive: 10 plays, 67 yards, 03:57.
- CONN - Chris Freeman 50-yard field goal, 8:44. Huskies 17–0. Drive: 4 plays, 5 yards, 01:56.
- CONN - Skyler Bell 9-yard pass from Joe Fagnano (Chris Freeman kick), 3:56. Huskies 24–0. Drive: 3 plays, 14 yards, 01:33.

Third quarter

- CONN - Juice Vereen 6-yard pass from Joe Fagnano (Chris Freeman kick), 8:02. Huskies 31–0. Drive: 7 plays, 45 yards, 03:13.
- UAB - Brandon Hawkins Jr. 68-yard pass from Ryder Burton (pass failed), 7:18. Huskies 31–6. Drive: 2 plays, 75 yards, 00:44.
- CONN - Skyler Bell 39-yard pass from Joe Fagnano (Chris Freeman kick), 5:18. Huskies 38–6. Drive: 6 plays, 72 yards, 02:00.

Fourth quarter

- UAB - Brandon Hawkins Jr. 32-yard run (pass failed), 12:09. Huskies 38–12. Drive: 4 plays, 59 yards, 01:28.
- UAB - Kaleb Brown 13-yard pass from Ryder Burton (Jonah Delange kick), 0:07. Huskies 38–19. Drive: 15 plays, 82 yards, 06:55.

Statistics	UAB	CONN
First downs	23	20
Plays–yards	70–372	61–374
Rushes–yards	34–154	31–107
Passing yards	218	267
Passing: Comp–Att–Int	24–36–3	23–30–0
Turnovers	3	0
Time of possession	31:09	28:51

Team	Category	Player	Statistics
UAB	Passing	Ryder Burton	21/30, 209 yards, 2 TD
UAB	Rushing	Jevon Jackson	9 carries, 61 yards
UAB	Receiving	Brandon Hawkins Jr.	4 receptions, 89 yards, TD
UAB	Defense	Devin Hightower	8 tackles
UConn	Passing	Joe Fagnano	23/30, 267 yards, 4 TD
UConn	Rushing	Cam Edwards	15 carries, 62 yards, TD
UConn	Receiving	Skyler Bell	8 receptions, 149 yards, 3 TD
UConn	Defense	Oumar Diomande	14 tackles, 1 sack

=== Duke ===
Duke Blue Devils (5–3) at UConn Huskies (6–3) – Game summary

Quarter	1	2	3	4	Total
Blue Devils	7	7	14	6	34
Huskies	10	10	3	14	37

at Rentschler Field • East Hartford, CT

- Date: November 8
- Game time: 3:32 PM EST
- Game weather: Sunny • Temperature: 60 °F (16 °C) • Wind: NW at 9 miles per hour (14 km/h)
- Game attendance: 38,106
- Referee: Darryl DeBerry
- TV announcers (CBSSN): Rich Waltz (play-by-play), Robert Turbin (analyst) and Tiffany Blackmon (sideline)
- Box Score

Game information

First quarter

- DUKE - Nate Sheppard 13-yard run (Todd Pelino kick), 12:31. Blue Devils 7–0. Drive: 3 plays, 55 yards, 01:05.
- CONN - Juice Vereen 10-yard pass from Joe Fagnano (Chris Freeman kick), 9:03. Tied 7–7. Drive: 7 plays, 70 yards, 03:28.
- CONN - Chris Freeman 29-yard field goal, 6:12. Huskies 10–7. Drive: 6 plays, 16 yards, 02:12.

Second quarter

- DUKE - Andrel Anthony 10-yard pass from Darian Mensah (Todd Pelino kick), 12:25. Blue Devils 14–10. Drive: 8 plays, 76 yards, 03:38.
- CONN - Skyler Bell 4-yard pass from Joe Fagnano (Chris Freeman kick), 5:59. Huskies 17–14. Drive: 12 plays, 73 yards, 06:21.
- CONN - Chris Freeman 45-yard field goal, 0:51. Huskies 20–14. Drive: 4 plays, 4 yards, 00:19.

Third quarter

- DUKE - Nate Sheppard 3-yard run (Todd Pelino kick), 10:13. Blue Devils 21–20. Drive: 9 plays, 75 yards, 04:47.
- CONN - Chris Freeman 20-yard field goal, 6:50. Huskies 23–21. Drive: 7 plays, 73 yards, 03:23.
- DUKE - Landen King 1-yard pass from Darian Mensah (Todd Pelino kick), 2:09. Blue Devils 28–23. Drive: 10 plays, 75 yards, 04:41.

Fourth quarter

- CONN - Cam Edwards 3-yard run (pass failed), 10:48. Huskies 29–28. Drive: 11 plays, 78 yards, 06:15.
- DUKE - Jeremiah Hasley 10-yard pass from Darian Mensah (pass failed), 5:34. Blue Devils 34–29. Drive: 11 plays, 80 yards, 05:09.
- CONN - Skyler Bell 19-yard pass from Joe Fagnano (Joe Fagnano run), 1:58. Huskies 37–34. Drive: 8 plays, 75 yards, 03:36.

Statistics	DUKE	UCONN
First downs	26	25
Plays–yards	65–390	70–467
Rushes–yards	34–168	30–156
Passing yards	222	311
Passing: comp–att–int	22–31–2	27–40–0
Turnovers	3	0
Time of possession	26:47	33:13

Team	Category	Player	Statistics
Duke	Passing	Darian Mensah	22/31, 222 yards, 3 TD
Duke	Rushing	Nate Sheppard	16 carries, 100 yards, 2 TD
Duke	Receiving	Que'Sean Brown	5 receptions, 61 yards
Duke	Defense	Dashawn Stone	6 tackles
UConn	Passing	Joe Fagnano	27/39, 311 yards, 3 TD
UConn	Rushing	Joe Fagnano	6 carries, 51 yards
UConn	Receiving	Reymello Murphy	5 rec, 110 yards
UConn	Defense	Bryun Parham	16 tackles, 1 sack, INT

=== Air Force ===
Air Force Falcons (3–6) at UConn Huskies (7–3) – Game summary

Quarter	1	2	3	4	Total
Falcons	7	0	3	6	16
Huskies	6	3	7	10	26

at Rentschler Field • East Hartford, CT

- Date: November 15
- Game time: 12:04 PM EST
- Game weather: Sunny • Temperature: 43 °F (6 °C) • Wind: SW at 4 miles per hour (6.4 km/h)
- Game attendance: 31,457
- Referee: Gary Reed Box Score
- TV announcers (CBSSN): Chris Lewis (play-by-play), Randy Cross (analyst) and Richard Johnson (sideline)

Game information

First quarter

- CONN – Joe Fagnano 10-yard run (pass failed), 10:29. Huskies 6–0. Drive: 7 plays, 40 yards, 2:39.
- AFA – Dylan Carson 6-yard run (Reagan Tubbs kick), 4:48. Falcons 7–6. Drive: 10 plays, 75 yards, 5:41.

Second quarter

- CONN – Chris Freeman 47-yard field goal, 0:28. Huskies 9–7. Drive: 7 plays, 35 yards, 1:15.

Third quarter

- CONN – Cam Edwards 8-yard run (Chris Freeman kick), 11:18. Huskies 16–7. Drive: 6 plays, 79 yards, 3:38.
- AFA – Reagan Tubbs 36-yard field goal, 5:17. Huskies 16–10. Drive: 11 plays, 56 yards, 6:01.

Fourth quarter

- CONN – Chris Freeman 27-yard field goal, 14:16. Huskies 19–10. Drive: 12 plays, 56 yards, 5:50.
- CONN – Cam Edwards 5-yard run (Chris Freeman kick), 5:28. Huskies 26–10. Drive: 10 plays, 84 yards, 6:24.
- AFA – Dylan Carson 2-yard run (pass failed), 2:29. Huskies 26–16. Drive: 9 plays, 75 yards, 2:54.

Statistics	AFA	CONN
First downs	23	18
Plays–yards	69–356	53–347
Rushes–yards	58–290	30–192
Passing yards	66	155
Passing: Comp–Att–Int	6-11-0	15-23-1
Turnovers	0	1
Time of possession	35:25	24:35

Team	Category	Player	Statistics
Air Force	Passing	Liam Szarka	2/3, 34 yards
Air Force	Rushing	Owen Allen	22 carries, 122 yards
Air Force	Receiving	Cade Harris	2 receptions, 25 yards
Air Force	Defense	Blake Fletcher	8 tackles
UConn	Passing	Joe Fagnano	15/23, 155 yards
UConn	Rushing	Cam Edwards	24 carries, 165 yards, 2 TD
UConn	Receiving	Skyler Bell	8 receptions, 70 yards
UConn	Defense	Malachi Mclean	13 tackles

=== at Florida Atlantic ===
UConn Huskies (8-3) at Florida Atlantic Owls (4-6) – Game summary

Quarter	1	2	3	4	Total
Huskies	24	3	7	14	48
Owls	3	14	14	14	45

at Flagler Credit Union Stadium • Boca Raton, FL

- Date: November 22
- Game time: 3:03 p.m. EST
- Game weather: Sunny • Temperature: 82 °F (28 °C) • Wind: SE at 8 miles per hour (13 km/h)
- Game attendance: 16,306
- Referee: Steven Anderson
- TV announcers (ESPN+): AJ Ricketts (play-by-play), Patrick Murray (analyst) and Savanna Collins (sideline)
- Box Score

Game information

First quarter

- CONN - Chris Freeman 39-yard field goal, 12:08. Huskies 3–0. Drive: 7 plays, 54 yards, 02:52.
- FAU - Garrison Smith 49-yard field goal, 8:47. Tied 3–3. Drive: 9 plays, 44 yards, 03:21.
- CONN - John Neider 24-yard pass from Joe Fagnano (Chris Freeman kick), 6:21. Huskies 10–3. Drive: 7 plays, 77 yards, 02:20.
- CONN - Shamar Porter 56-yard pass from Joe Fagnano (Chris Freeman kick), 3:38. Huskies 17–3. Drive: 2 plays, 60 yards, 00:47.
- CONN - Alex Honig 32-yard pass from Joe Fagnano (Chris Freeman kick), 1:21. Huskies 24–3. Drive: 2 plays, 55 yards, 00:45.

Second quarter

- FAU - Easton Messer 39-yard run (Garrison Smith kick), 14:18. Huskies 24–10. Drive: 7 plays, 75 yards, 02:03.
- FAU - Caden Veltkamp 17-yard run (Garrison Smith kick), 5:22. Huskies 24–17. Drive: 9 plays, 80 yards, 03:08.
- CONN - Chris Freeman 25-yard field goal, 1:09. Huskies 27–17. Drive: 12 plays, 69 yards, TOP 04:06

Third quarter

- FAU - Kaden Shields-Dutton 11-yard run (Garrison Smith kick), 12:01. Huskies 27–24. Drive: 9 plays, 75 yards, 02:59.
- FAU - Dom Henry 90-yard pass from Caden Veltkamp (Garrison Smith kick), 6:48. Owls 31–27. Drive: 4 plays, 99 yards, 01:50.
- CONN - Cam Edwards 1-yard run (Chris Freeman kick), 2:09. Huskies 34–31. Drive: 9 plays, 75 yards, 04:39.

Fourth quarter

- CONN - Mel Brown 44-yard run (Chris Freeman kick), 10:11. Huskies 41–31. Drive: 7 plays, 71 yards, 03:32.
- FAU - Easton Messer 33-yard pass from Caden Veltkamp (Garrison Smith kick), 7:13. Huskies 41–38. Drive: 10 plays, 75 yards, 02:58.
- FAU - Caden Veltkamp 11-yard run (Garrison Smith kick), 2:11. Owls 45–41. Drive: 11 plays, 76 yards, 03:14.
- CONN - Cam Edwards 1-yard run (Chris Freeman kick), 0:26. Huskies 48–45. Drive: 15 plays, 75 yards, 01:45.

Statistics	CONN	FAU
First downs	31	37
Plays–yards	79–600	87–687
Rushes–yards	33–154	32–193
Passing yards	446	494
Passing: Comp–Att–Int	33-46-0	42-55-1
Turnovers	0	2
Time of possession	32:28	27:32

Team	Category	Player	Statistics
UConn	Passing	Joe Fagnano	33/46, 446 yards, 3 TD
UConn	Rushing	Cam Edwards	16 carries, 101 yards, 2 TD
UConn	Receiving	Skyler Bell	8 receptions, 125 yards
UConn	Defense	Lee Molette III	13 tackles
Florida Atlantic	Passing	Caden Veltkamp	42/55, 494 yards, 2 TD
Florida Atlantic	Rushing	Kaden Shields-Dutton	14 carries, 77 yards, TD
Florida Atlantic	Receiving	Dom Henry	7 receptions, 157 yards, TD
Florida Atlantic	Defense	Leon Hart Jr.	9 tackles

=== vs. Army (Fenway Bowl) ===
2025 Wasabi Fenway Bowl
UConn Huskies (9-3) vs. Army Black Knights (6-6) – Game summary

Quarter	1	2	3	4	Total
Huskies	7	3	0	6	16
Black Knights	7	7	13	14	41

at Fenway Park • Boston, MA

- Date: December 27
- Game time: 2:20 p.m. EST
- Game weather: Sunny • Temperature: 23 °F (−5 °C) • Wind: SW at 10 miles per hour (16 km/h)
- Game attendance: 22,461
- Referee: James Carter
- TV announcers (ESPN): Wes Durham (play-by-play), Steve Addazio (analyst) and Dana Boyle (sideline)
- Box Score

Game information

First Quarter

- (9:17) CONN – Cam Edwards 12-yard run, Chris Freeman kick (Drive: 5 plays, 54 yards, 2:08; UConn 7–0)
- (6:01) ARMY – Noah Short 40-yard pass from Cale Hellums, Dawson Jones kick (Drive: 6 plays, 75 yards, 3:16; Tied 7–7)

Second Quarter

- (3:04) ARMY – Godspower Nwawuihe 43-yard run, Dawson Jones kick (Drive: 10 plays, 90 yards, 5:57; Army 14–7)
- (0:00) CONN – Chris Freeman 49-yard field goal (Drive: 10 plays, 51 yards, 2:58; Army 14–10)

Third Quarter

- (14:04) ARMY – Godspower Nwawuihe 70-yard run, kick failed (Drive: 2 plays, 75 yards, 0:56; Army 20–10)
- (6:22) ARMY – Cale Hellums 1-yard run, Dawson Jones kick (Drive: 11 plays, 57 yards, 6:48; Army 27–10)

Fourth Quarter

- (8:18) ARMY – Cale Hellums 6-yard run, Dawson Jones kick (Drive: 15 plays, 89 yards, 8:22; Army 34–10)
- (5:47) CONN – Ksaan Farrar 11-yard run, pass failed (Drive: 6 plays, 58 yards, 2:19; Army 34–16)
- (1:20) ARMY – Carson Smith 6-yard run, Dawson Jones kick (Drive: 9 plays, 42 yards, 4:25; Army 41–16)

Statistics	CONN	ARMY
First downs	14	23
Plays–yards	47–267	65–476
Rushes–yards	30–183	56–368
Passing yards	84	108
Passing: comp–att–int	11–17–0	7–9–0
Turnovers	0	1
Time of possession	23:45	36:15

Team	Category	Player	Statistics
UConn	Passing	Ksaan Farrar	11/17, 84 yards
UConn	Rushing	Cam Edwards	11 carries, 108 yards, TD
UConn	Receiving	Reymello Murphy	7 receptions, 51 yards
UConn	Defense	Lee Molette III	10 tackles
Army	Passing	Cale Hellums	7/8, 108 yards, TD
Army	Rushing	Godspower Nwawuihe	12 carries, 171 yards, 2 TD
Army	Receiving	Noah Short	7 receptions, 108 yards, TD
Army	Defense	Kaleb Fortner	6 tackles, 0.5 sacks

== Personnel ==
=== Roster ===
2025 UConn Huskies football team roster
Players
Coaches
Offense

Pos.	#	Name	Class
RB	0	Cam Edwards	Jr
WR	1	Skyler Bell	Sr
QB	2	Joe Fagnano	GS
QB	3	Nick Evers	Jr
WR	4	Thai Chiaokhiao-Bowman	Jr
WR	5	Shamar Porter	So
WR	6	Reymello Murphy	Sr
RB	7	Mel Brown	Sr
QB	8	Ksaan Farrar	Fr
WR	9	Naiem Simmons	GS
WR	10	Griffin Koch	Jr
TE	11	Javonte Vereen	So
QB	12	Tucker McDonald	So
WR	13	Chris Parker	Sr
TE	14	Bryce Anderson	Fr
WR	15	Terrence Smith	Fr
WR	17	Teddy Williams	So
QB	18	Tyler Smith	Fr
WR	19	Jackson Harper	So
WR	21	Trace Bratten	Fr
RB	21	Malichi Greaves	Fr
RB	22	Victor Rosa	Jr
RB	24	MJ Flowers	Jr
WR	25	Daniel Rose	Fr
RB	26	Soren Rief	Fr
RB	27	Caden Hillier	Fr
TE	30	Dominic Toy	So
RB	39	Roberto Salas	Fr
TE	42	Mike Burton	Jr
RB	44	Oliver Lundberg Coleman	Fr
OL	50	Tank Green	Sr
OL	51	Joe McGann	Fr
OL	52	Deron McLaughlin	Fr
OL	53	Christos Zigoumis	Fr
OL	54	Jake Kiernan	So
OL	55	Toluwanimi Tunde	So
OL	56	Tamarus Walker	So
OL	58	Kyle Juergans	Sr
OL	59	Finn Wilkins	Fr
OL	61	Diego Rodriguez	Fr
OL	66	Brady Wayburn	So
OL	69	Ty Chan	Jr
OL	73	Wes Hoeh	Sr
OL	74	Jayden Bass	So
OL	75	Hill Greenlee	Fr
OL	76	Toriyan Johnson	So
OL	77	Ben Murawski	Jr
OL	78	Carsten Casady	So
OL	79	Danny Antolovich	Sr
WR	80	John Neider	So
TE	81	Louis Hansen	Sr
WR	82	Rashard Williams	So
TE	83	Xavier Watson	Fr
WR	84	Makih Johnson	Fr
WR	85	Drew Kron	Jr
TE	86	Alexander Honig	Sr
TE	87	Clemens Richter	Fr
TE	88	Nader Chirchi	So
WR	89	Trace Bratten	Fr

Defense

Pos.	#	Name	Class
DB	0	Kobi Albert	So
DL	1	Ben Smiley	Sr
DB	2	Devin Pringle	Sr
DB	3	D'Mon Brinson	Sr
DB	4	Kolubah Pewee Jr.	Sr
LB	5	Aaron Key	GS
LB	6	Bryun Parham	Sr
DB	7	Malachi Mclean	Jr
LB	8	Sione Moa	GS
LB	9	Amir Renwick	GS
LB	10	Tyquan King	Sr
LB	11	Donovan Branch	Sr
DB	12	Chris Hudson	Jr
DB	13	Cam Chadwick	So
DB	14	Tyrece Mills	Sr
DB	15	Kamo'i Latu	Sr
DB	16	Drew Buckley	So
DL	17	Nykobi Brown	Fr
DB	18	Kylish Hicks	Jr
LB	19	Ethan Hogg	Fr
DB	20	Osiris Gilbert	Fr
DB	21	Lee Molette III	Sr
DB	22	Axavier Bridges-Brooks	Fr
DB	23	Diondre Glover	GS
DB	24	Michael Robinson III	Jr
DB	25	Saxton Suchanic	Fr
DB	26	Jeremiah Lomax	GS
DB	27	Chase Fountain	So
LB	28	Jon Morris	Fr
LB	29	Lewenski Ydore	Fr
LB	30	Charles Johnson	Fr
DB	31	Diandre Harris	Sr
LB	32	Oumar Diomande	So
DL	33	Kervins Choute	Sr
DB	34	Carter Boskovich	So
LB	37	Hayden Pegg	So
DB	38	Jaion Williams	Fr
LB	39	Charlie O'Connor	Fr
DL	44	Cooper Ackerman	Fr
DL	50	Brandon Kelly	So
DL	52	Cleto Chol	So
LB	54	Ed Entsiwah	Fr
DL	55	Vincent Carroll-Jackson	So
DL	58	Antoineo Harris Jr.	GS
DL	59	Eddie Dresch	Fr
DL	73	Charlie Leahy	Fr
DL	89	Trent Jones II	Sr
DL	91	Brady Fodor	So
DL	92	Stephon Wright	GS
DL	93	Aubrey Melvin	Fr
DL	94	Matt Hoffman	Jr
DL	96	Marquis Black	GS
DL	99	Delano Brown	Fr

Special teams

Pos.	#	Name	Class
P	17	Connor Stutz	Sr
LS	24	Tashi Crofut	Fr
K	28	Chris Freeman	GS
P	35	Spencer Sullins	Fr
LS	47	Zach Christinat	So
LS	51	Nick Pompilli	Fr
K	98	Leo Ricci	Fr

Head coach

- Jim L. Mora

Coordinators/assistant coaches

- Matt Brock
  Defensive coordinator
- Gordon Sammis
  Offensive coordinator
- Doug Shearer
  Special teams coordinator
- Kenny McClendon
  Defensive line
- Pryce Tracy
  Quarterbacks / Passing Game Coordinator
- Christian Pace
  Offensive Line
- Kashif Moore
  Wide Receivers
- Antonio Wilcox
  Running Backs
- Cole Peterson
  Tight Ends
- Dalton Hilliard
  Secondary / Pass Game Coordinator
- Siriki Diabate
  Linebackers / Run Game Coordinator
- Ted Hefter
  Senior Offensive Analyst / Quarterbacks

Legend

- (C) Team captain
- (S) Suspended
- (I) Ineligible
- Injured
- Redshirt

Roster
Last update: August 5, 2025

=== Coaching staff additions ===
Name	Position	Old team	Old position
Nate Atkins	Assistant defensive line	Ball State	Safeties
Ted Hefter	Senior offensive analyst, quarterbacks	William & Mary	Quarterbacks
Rante Jones	Player personnel assistant & defensive assistant	None	
Matt Leifheit	Assistant special teams	Southern Miss	Special teams graduate assistant
Kendrick Shaver	Assistant defensive backs	Mississippi State	Defensive analyst
Pryce Tracy	Quarterbacks/pass game coordinator	Georgia	Assistant to the head coach, assistant tight ends

=== Coaching staff departures ===
Name	Position	New Team	New position
Brad Robbins	Pass game coordinator, quarterbacks	Tulsa	Pass game coordinator, quarterbacks

=== Transfers out ===
Name	Pos.	Height	Weight	Year	Hometown	New school
Reggie Akles	CB	6'1	190	Senior	Troutdale, OR	
Kaleb Anthony	CB	6'0	170	Senior	McDonough, GA	
John Bechtle	TE	6'1	220	Senior	Warren, NJ	Johns Hopkins
Malcolm Bell	DB	6'1	185	Redshirt Junior	Montreal, QC	Michigan State
Alfred Chea	LB	6'3	220	Senior	Jacksonville, FL	Ball State
Frank Daniley	RB	5'10	180	Redshirt Freshman	New Haven, CT	New Haven
Isiah Davis	CB	6'1	190	Redshirt Sophomore	Fairburn, GA	Florida A&M
Bryan Domino	WR	5'9	165	Redshirt Freshman	Richmond, TX	Indiana State
Zack Drawdy	WR	6'2	185	Sophomore	Yulee, FL	Indiana State
Dean Engram	S	5'10	165	Redshirt Senior	Washington, DC	
Jasaiah Gathings	WR	6'0	190	Redshirt Junior	Statesville, NC	Buffalo
Langston Hardy	LB	6'4	250	Redshirt Sophomore	Jacksonville, FL	Wake Forest
Nick Harris	TE	6'7	255	Senior	Marriottsville, MD	Eastern Michigan
Jarvis Jones	WR	6'3	170	Sophomore	West Orange, NJ	Towson
Terry Kirksey	LB	6'4	220	Redshirt Senior	Mobile, AL	Arkansas State
James Larson	TE	6'4	235	Freshman	St. Charles, IL	SMU
Brock Montgomery	WR	6'2	195	Freshman	Lebanon, TN	Marshall
Timothy Passmore Jr.	DL	6'2	295	Redshirt Sophomore	Cocoa, FL	UMass
Durell Robinson	RB	6'1	200	Redshirt Freshman	Baltimore, MD	Auburn
Daniel Shaban	RB	6'0	205	Freshman	Redding, CT	Colgate
Julien Simon	LB	6'1	227	Redshirt Junior	Tacoma, WA	
Jarvarius Sims	DB	5'11	185	Junior	Decatur, GA	Western Michigan
Zakhari Spears	CB	6'2	197	Sophomore	Los Angeles, CA	Idaho
Kaleb Stewart	LB	5'11	210	Freshman	Miramar, FL	
Malik Thomas Jr.	RB	5'11	200	Senior	Danbury, CT	
Jake Triptree	QB	6'1	200	Freshman	Sayville, NY	New Haven
Seth Turner	P	6'1	195	Redshirt Freshman	Malvern, PA	Purdue
Kalen Villanueva	LB	6'1	206	Senior	Falls Church, VA	Campbell
Nathaniel Wallace-Dilling	P	6'2	195	Redshirt Freshman	Grandview Heights, OH	UT Rio Grande Valley
Cole Welliver	QB	6'6	200	Freshman	Flower Mound, TX	New Mexico
Pryce Yates	DL	6'4	265	Redshirt Junior	San Antonio, TX	North Carolina

=== Transfers in ===
Name	Pos.	Height	Weight	Year	Hometown	Old school
Kobi Albert	DB	5'11	180	(redshirt) Sophomore	Fairfield, AL	Mississippi State
Sammy Anderson Jr.	DB	6'0	191	(redshirt) Senior	Dayton, OH	Austin Peay
Marquis Black	DL	6'5	313	(redshirt) Senior	Stockbridge, GA	Gardner–Webb
Hayden Bozich	OL	6'7	315	Junior	Steubenville, OH	Brown
Caleb Burton III	WR	5'11	174	Sophomore	Austin, TX	Auburn
Michael Burton	TE	6'2	280	Senior	Wilton, CT	Georgetown
Ty Chan	OL	6'5	320	(redshirt) Junior	Lowell, MA	Notre Dame
Thai Chiaokhiao-Brown	WR	6'0	202	Sophomore	Minneapolis, MN	Rice
Tashi Crofut	LS	6'0	215	Freshman	Lake Oswego, OR	Boise State
Elijah Culp	CB	5'11	180	(redshirt) Junior	Charlotte, NC	Charlotte
MJ Flowers	RB	6'1	220	(redshirt) Sophomore	Cincinnati, OH	Eastern Illinois
Diondre Glover	CB	5'11	180	(redshirt) Senior	Covington, GA	Gardner–Webb
Antoineo Harris Jr.	EDGE	6'3	230	(redshirt) Senior	Chicago, IL	Utah State
Diandre Harris	DB	5'11	170	Senior	Chicago, IL	Georgetown
Vincent Jackson	DL	6'5	290	(redshirt) Freshman	Harrisburg, PA	Nebraska
Trent Jones II	DE	6'3	275	(redshirt) Junior	Eden Prairie, MN	Iowa State
Tyquan King	LB	6'2	225	(redshirt) Junior	West Haven, CT	Temple
Terry Kirksey	LB	6'4	220	(redshirt) Junior	Mobile, AL	Kansas State
Griffin Koch	WR	6'2	170	(redshirt) Sophomore	New Canaan, CT	Kansas
Kamo'i Latu	S	6'0	207	Senior	Honolulu, HI	Wisconsin
Jeremiah Lomax	S	6'0	190	Junior	Abbeville, SC	Limestone
Tyrece Mills	S	6'1	209	Senior	Philadelphia, PA	Penn State
Sione Moa	LB	6'1	175	(redshirt) Junior	Ogden, UT	BYU
Reymello Murphy	WR	6'0	185	Senior	Fremont, CA	Arizona
Bryun Parham	LB	5'11	223	Senior	Long Beach, CA	Washington
Chris Parker	WR	6'3	195	(redshirt) Junior	Saginaw, MI	Central Michigan
Kolubah Pewee	DB	5'11	170	(redshirt) Senior	Staten Island, NY	Georgetown
Devin Pringle	S	5'10	182	Junior	Bolingbrook, IL	Grand Valley State
Naiem Simmons	WR	5'10	185	Senior	Cherry Hill, NJ	South Florida
Ben Smiley III	DL	6'4	308	Graduate Student	Norfolk, VA	Virginia
Caleb Smith	QB	6'1	195	Freshman	Westport, CT	Boston University (lacrosse)
Spencer Sullins	P	6'3	199	Freshman	Athens, TN	Memphis
Javonte Vereen	TE	6'4	214	Sophomore	Havelock, NC	NC State
Tamarus Walker	OL	6'3	320	(redshirt) Freshman	Baltimore, MD	Maryland
Stephon Wright	DL	6'3	280	Graduate Student	Los Angeles, CA	Texas Southern
