= 2025 Fenway Bowl =

Postseason college football bowl game

2025 Wasabi Fenway Bowl
- 4th Fenway Bowl
UConn Huskies	Army Black Knights
(9–3)	(6–6)
Independent	American
16	41
Head coach: Gordon Sammis (interim)	Head coach: Jeff Monken
	1	2	3	4	Total
UConn	7	3	0	6	16
Army	7	7	13	14	41
- Date: December 27, 2025
- Season: 2025
- Stadium: Fenway Park
- Location: Boston, Massachusetts
- MVP: Godspower Nwawuihe (RB, Army) & Kalib Fortner (LB, Army)
- Favorite: Army by 7.5
- Referee: James Carter (SEC)
- Attendance: 22,461

United States TV coverage
- Network: ESPN
- Announcers: Wes Durham (play-by-play), Steve Addazio (analyst), and Dana Boyle (sideline)

The 2025 Fenway Bowl was a college football bowl game played on December 27, 2025, at Fenway Park in Boston, Massachusetts. The fourth annual Fenway Bowl began at approximately 2:15 p.m. EST and aired on ESPN. The Fenway Bowl was one of the 2025–26 bowl games concluding the 2025 FBS football season. The game was sponsored by cloud storage company Wasabi Technologies and was officially known as the Wasabi Fenway Bowl.

Army of the American Conference defeated UConn, an FBS independent, by a 41–16 score.

== Teams ==
Based on conference tie-ins, the game was expected to feature teams from Atlantic Coast Conference (ACC), American Conference, or FBS independent Notre Dame. The announced matchup was between Army of the American Conference and FBS independent UConn. UConn and Army had previously played each other nine times, with UConn holding a slight 5–4 series lead entering the Fenway Bowl.

=== UConn Huskies ===
UConn lost two of their first three games, but thereafter only had one defeat in their nine remaining games. The Huskies entered the Fenway Bowl with a 9–3 record. UConn was the defending Fenway Bowl champion, having defeated North Carolina in the 2024 edition. Starting quarterback Joe Fagnano declined to play in order to prepare for the NFL draft.

=== Army Black Knights ===
Army opened their season with a loss to Tarleton State, an FCS program; their record stood at 3–4 at the end of October. The Black Knights won three of their next four games, then suffered a one-point defeat to Navy on December 13. Army entered the Fenway Bowl with a 6–6 record.

== Game summary ==
2025 Wasabi Fenway Bowl

Quarter	1	2	3	4	Total
UConn	7	3	0	6	16
Army	7	7	13	14	41

at Fenway Park • Boston, Massachusetts

- Date: Saturday, December 27, 2025
- Game time: 2:15 p.m. EST
- Game attendance: 22,461
- Referee: James Carter
- TV announcers (ESPN): Wes Durham (play-by-play), Steve Addazio (analyst), and Dana Boyle (sideline)
- Box score

=== Statistics ===
Statistics	UCONN	ARMY
First downs	14	23
Plays–yards	48–267	65–476
Rushes–yards	30–183	56–368
Passing yards	84	108
Passing: comp–att–int	11–17–0	7–9–0
Turnovers		
Time of possession	23:45	36:15

Team	Category	Player	Statistics
UConn	Passing	Ksaan Farrar	11/17, 84 yards
UConn	Rushing	Cam Edwards	11 carries, 108 yards, 1 TD
UConn	Receiving	Reymello Murphy	7 receptions, 51 yards
Army	Passing	Cale Hellums	7/8, 108 yards, 1 TD
Army	Rushing	Godspower Nwawuihe	12 carries, 171 yards, 2 TD
Army	Receiving	Noah Short	7 receptions, 108 yards, 1 TD
