= 2025 Army Black Knights football team =

American college football season

2025 Army Black Knights football

Fenway Bowl champion

Fenway Bowl, W 41–16 vs. UConn
- Conference: American Conference
- Record: 7–6 (4–4 American)
- Head coach: Jeff Monken (12th season)
- Offensive coordinator: Cody Worley (2nd season)
- Offensive scheme: Triple option
- Defensive coordinator: Nate Woody (6th season)
- Base defense: 3–4
- Home stadium: Michie Stadium

2025 American Conference football standings
	Conf.			Overall
Team	W		L	W		L
No. 18 Tulane y$^	7	–	1	11	–	3
No. 24 North Texas y	7	–	1	12	–	2
No. 23 Navy	7	–	1	11	–	2
South Florida	6	–	2	9	–	4
East Carolina	6	–	2	9	–	4
Memphis	4	–	4	8	–	5
Army	4	–	4	7	–	6
UTSA	4	–	4	7	–	6
Temple	3	–	5	5	–	7
Florida Atlantic	3	–	5	4	–	8
Rice	2	–	6	5	–	8
UAB	2	–	6	4	–	8
Tulsa	1	–	7	4	–	8
Charlotte	0	–	8	1	–	11
Championship: Tulane 34, North Texas 21
^ – College Football Playoff participant; $ – Conference champion; y – Championship game participant; Rankings from AP Poll

The 2025 Army Black Knights football team represented the United States Military Academy in the American Conference during the 2025 NCAA Division I FBS football season. The Black Knights, led by Jeff Monken in his 12th year as head coach, played their home games at Michie Stadium, located on the academy grounds in West Point, New York.

== Schedule ==
Date	Time	Opponent	Site	TV	Result	Attendance
August 29	6:00 p.m.	No. 10 (FCS) Tarleton State*	Michie Stadium; West Point, NY	CBSSN	L 27–30 ^{2OT}	23,032
September 6	7:00 p.m.	at Kansas State*	Bill Snyder Family Stadium; Manhattan, KS	ESPN	W 24–21	52,723
September 20	12:00 p.m.	North Texas	Michie Stadium; West Point, NY	CBSSN	L 38–45 ^{OT}	28,446
September 25	7:30 p.m.	at East Carolina	Dowdy–Ficklen Stadium; Greenville, NC	ESPN	L 6–28	32,497
October 4	12:00 p.m.	at UAB	Protective Stadium; Birmingham, AL	ESPNU	W 31–13	22,489
October 11	12:00 p.m.	Charlotte	Michie Stadium; West Point, NY	CBSSN	W 24–7	31,172
October 18	12:00 p.m.	at Tulane	Yulman Stadium; New Orleans, LA	ESPNU	L 17–24	20,027
November 1	12:00 p.m.	at Air Force*	Falcon Stadium; USAF Academy, CO (Commander-in-Chief's Trophy)	CBS	W 20–17	39,441
November 8	12:00 p.m.	Temple	Michie Stadium; West Point, NY	CBSSN	W 14–13	30,594
November 22	12:00 p.m.	Tulsa	Michie Stadium; West Point, NY	CBSSN	L 25–26	28,705
November 29	3:30 p.m.	at UTSA	Alamodome; San Antonio, TX	ESPN+	W 27–24	22,620
December 13	3:00 p.m.	vs. Navy*	M&T Bank Stadium; Baltimore, MD (Army–Navy Game, Commander-in-Chief's Trophy)	CBS	L 16–17	70,936
December 27	2:15 p.m.	vs. UConn*	Fenway Park; Boston, MA (Fenway Bowl)	ESPN	W 41–16	22,461
*Non-conference game; Rankings from AP Poll - Released prior to game; All times are in Eastern time

== Game summaries ==
=== No. 10 (FCS) Tarleton State ===
No. 10 (FCS) Tarleton State Texans (1–0) at Army Black Knights (0–0) – Game summary

Quarter	1	2	3	4	OT	2OT	Total
No. 10 (FCS) Texans	3	7	7	7	3	3	30
Black Knights	7	10	7	0	3	0	27

at Michie Stadium • West Point, NY

- Date: August 29
- Game time: 6:00 p.m. EDT
- Game weather: Cloudy • Temperature: 70 °F (21 °C) • Wind: WNW at 10 miles per hour (16 km/h)
- Game attendance: 23,032
- Referee: Reid Jackson
- TV announcers (CBSSN): Dave Ryan (play-by-play), Adam Breneman (analyst) and Tina Cervasio (sideline)

Game information

First quarter

- (8:05) TAR – Brad Larson 30-yard field goal (Drive: 12 plays, 65 yards, 5:02; Tarleton State 3–0)
- (4:08) ARMY – Dewayne Coleman 36-yard run, Dawson Jones kick (Drive: 7 plays, 75 yards, 3:57; Army 7–3)

Second quarter

- (9:43) TAR – Tre Page III 10-yard run, Brad Larson kick (Drive: 12 plays, 90 yards, 4:29; Tarleton State 10–7)
- (1:47) ARMY – Dawson Jones 24-yard field goal (Drive: 15 plays, 67 yards, 7:49; Tied 10–10)
- (0:15) ARMY – Cale Hellums 1-yard run, Dawson Jones kick (Drive: 5 plays, 39 yards, 0:45; Army 17–10)

Third quarter

- (8:14) ARMY – Hayden Reed 37-yard run, Dawson Jones kick (Drive: 6 plays, 65 yards, 2:53; Army 24–10)
- (5:15) TAR – Caleb Lewis 6-yard run, Brad Larson kick (Drive: 7 plays, 75 yards, 2:59; Army 24–17)

Fourth quarter

- (9:05) TAR – Dawson Hearne 15-yard pass from Victor Gabalis, Brad Larson kick (Drive: 3 plays, 20 yards, 0:50; Tied 24–24)

Overtime

- TAR – Brad Larson 28-yard field goal (Drive: 8 plays, 14 yards; Tarleton State 27–24)
- ARMY – Dawson Jones 40-yard field goal (Drive: 4 plays, 7 yards; Tied 27–27)

Double overtime

- TAR – Brad Larson 37-yard field goal (Drive: 4 plays, 5 yards; Tarleton State 30–27)

Statistics	TAR	ARMY
First downs	16	24
Plays–yards	72–344	82–411
Rushes–yards	42–192	66–280
Passing yards	152	131
Passing: comp–att–int	16–30–0	8–16–2
Turnovers	0	3
Time of possession	23:26	36:34

Team	Category	Player	Statistics
Tarleton State	Passing	Victor Gabalis	16/30, 152 yards, TD
Tarleton State	Rushing	Caleb Lewis	20 carries, 107 yards, TD
Tarleton State	Receiving	Cody Jackson	6 receptions, 53 yards
Army	Passing	Dewayne Coleman	7/12, 129 yards, 2 INT
Army	Rushing	Dewayne Coleman	24 carries, 100 yards, TD
Army	Receiving	Noah Short	6 receptions, 81 yards

=== at Kansas State ===
Army Black Knights (0–1) at Kansas State Wildcats (1–1) – Game summary

Quarter	1	2	3	4	Total
Black Knights	0	7	7	10	24
Wildcats	3	10	8	0	21

at Bill Snyder Family Stadium • Manhattan, KS

- Date: September 6
- Game time: 7:00 p.m. EDT
- Game weather: Sunny • Temperature: 73 °F (23 °C) • Wind: W at 13 miles per hour (21 km/h)
- Game attendance: 52,723
- Referee: David Alvarez
- TV announcers (ESPN): Roy Philpott (play-by-play), Louis Riddick (analyst) and Kris Budden (sideline)

Game information

First quarter

- KSU – Luis Rodriguez 34-yard field goal, 11:21. Wildcats 3–0. Drive: 8 plays, 33 yards, 3:31.

Second quarter

- KSU – Jaron Tibbs 32-yard pass from Avery Johnson (Luis Rodriguez kick), 11:47. Wildcats 10–0. Drive: 6 plays, 47 yards, 2:33.
- KSU – Luis Rodriguez 38-yard field goal, 2:25. Wildcats 13–0. Drive: 12 plays, 68 yards, 7:03.
- ARMY – Brady Anderson 2-yard pass from Cale Hellums (Dawson Jones kick), 0:00. Wildcats 13–7. Drive: 16 plays, 75 yards, 2:25.

Third quarter

- ARMY – Cale Hellums 1-yard run (Dawson Jones kick), 3:20. Black Knights 14–13. Drive: 14 plays, 89 yards, 7:58.
- KSU – Bryce Noernberg 99-yard kickoff return (Avery Johnson pass to Jaron Tibbs), 3:08. Wildcats 21–14.

Fourth quarter

- ARMY – Dawson Jones 35-yard field goal, 10:46. Wildcats 21–17. Drive: 13 plays, 57 yards, 7:22.
- ARMY – Cale Hellums 14-yard run (Dawson Jones kick), 2:52. Black Knights 24–21. Drive: 14 plays, 56 yards, 7:54.

Statistics	ARMY	KSU
First downs	20	13
Plays–yards	82–332	43–246
Rushes–yards	70–237	18–74
Passing yards	95	172
Passing: comp–att–int	8–12–0	15–25–1
Turnovers	0	1
Time of possession	40:29	19:31

Team	Category	Player	Statistics
Army	Passing	Noah Short	1/1, 52 yards
Army	Rushing	Cale Hellums	41 carries, 124 yards, 2 TD
Army	Receiving	Brady Anderson	3 receptions, 64 yards, TD
Kansas State	Passing	Avery Johnson	15/25, 172 yards, TD, INT
Kansas State	Rushing	Joe Jackson	7 carries, 30 yards
Kansas State	Receiving	Jaron Tibbs	5 receptions, 61 yards, TD

=== North Texas ===
North Texas Mean Green (3–0) at Army Black Knights (1–1) – Game summary

Quarter	1	2	3	4	OT	Total
Mean Green	21	7	3	7	7	45
Black Knights	7	7	7	17	0	38

at Michie Stadium • West Point, NY

- Date: September 20
- Game time: 12:00 p.m. EDT
- Game weather: Sunny • Temperature: 68 °F (20 °C) • Wind: NE at 5 miles per hour (8.0 km/h)
- Game attendance: 28,446
- Referee: Charles Lamertina
- TV announcers (CBSSN): Dave Ryan (play-by-play), Adam Breneman (analyst) and Tina Cervasio (sideline)

Game information

First quarter

- (8:22) UNT – Caleb Hawkins 4-yard run, Kali Nguma kick (Drive: 15 plays, 75 yards, 6:38; North Texas 7–0)
- (3:21) UNT – Makenzie McGill II 6-yard run, Kali Nguma kick (Drive: 5 plays, 44 yards, 1:45; North Texas 14–0)
- (1:24) UNT – Caleb Hawkins 7-yard run, Kali Nguma kick (Drive: 3 plays, 18 yards, 0:39; North Texas 21–0)
- (1:14) ARMY – Briggs Bartosh 75-yard run, Dawson Jones kick (Drive: 1 play, 75 yards, 0:10; North Texas 21–7)

Second quarter

- (6:35) UNT – Wyatt Young 6-yard pass from Drew Mestemaker, Kali Nguma kick (Drive: 2 plays, 10 yards, 1:00; North Texas 28–7)
- (0:37) ARMY – Samari Howard 17-yard pass from Dewayne Coleman, Dawson Jones kick (Drive: 13 plays, 75 yards, 5:58; North Texas 28–14)

Third quarter

- (11:07) ARMY – Hayden Reed 37-yard run, Dawson Jones kick (Drive: 7 plays, 75 yards, 3:53; North Texas 28–21)
- (6:25) UNT – Kali Nguma 23-yard field goal (Drive: 12 plays, 67 yards, 4:35; North Texas 31–21)

Fourth quarter

- (11:27) ARMY – Dewayne Coleman 5-yard run, Dawson Jones kick (Drive: 17 plays, 75 yards, 9:58; North Texas 31–28)
- (9:03) UNT – Caleb Hawkins 21-yard run, Kali Nguma kick (Drive: 6 plays, 60 yards, 2:22; North Texas 38–28)
- (2:56) ARMY – Brady Anderson 68-yard pass from Dewayne Coleman, Dawson Jones kick (Drive: 4 plays, 75 yards, 0:39; North Texas 38–35)
- (0:09) ARMY – Dawson Jones 23-yard field goal (Drive: 14 plays, 50 yards, 2:40; Tied 38–38)

Overtime

- UNT – Caleb Hawkins 3-yard run, Kali Nguma kick (Drive: 5 plays, 25 yards; North Texas 45–38)

Statistics	UNT	ARMY
First downs	26	26
Plays–yards	78–478	82–488
Rushes–yards	42–229	68–387
Passing yards	249	101
Passing: comp–att–int	26–36–0	6–14–1
Turnovers	1	3
Time of possession	27:59	32:01

Team	Category	Player	Statistics
North Texas	Passing	Drew Mestemaker	26/36, 249 yards, TD
North Texas	Rushing	Makenzie McGill II	19 carries, 101 yards, TD
North Texas	Receiving	Miles Coleman	8 receptions, 74 yards
Army	Passing	Dewayne Coleman	6/11, 101 yards, 2 TD
Army	Rushing	Dewayne Coleman	23 carries, 117 yards, TD
Army	Receiving	Brady Anderson	1 reception, 68 yards, TD

=== at East Carolina ===
Army Black Knights (1–2) at East Carolina Pirates (2–2) – Game summary

Quarter	1	2	3	4	Total
Black Knights	0	0	6	0	6
Pirates	21	0	0	7	28

at Dowdy–Ficklen Stadium • Greenville, NC

- Date: September 25
- Game time: 7:30 p.m. EDT
- Game attendance: 32,497
- Referee: Kevin Randall
- TV announcers (ESPN): Matt Barrie (play-by-play), Tom Luginbill (analyst) and Harry Lyles Jr. (sideline)

Game information

First quarter

- (12:07) ECU – Katin Houser 3-yard run, Nick Mazzie kick (Drive: 9 plays, 75 yards, 2:53; East Carolina 7–0)
- (8:22) ECU – Anthony Smith 40-yard pass from Katin Houser, Nick Mazzie kick (Drive: 6 plays, 70 yards, 2:12; East Carolina 14–0)
- (0:39) ECU – Jayvontay Conner 20-yard pass from Katin Houser, Nick Mazzie kick (Drive: 9 plays, 71 yards, 2:37; East Carolina 21–0)

Second quarter

- No scoring plays.

Third quarter

- (10:32) ARMY – Dewayne Coleman 2-yard run, run failed (Drive: 8 plays, 75 yards, 4:28; East Carolina 21–6)

Fourth quarter

- (8:14) ECU – Kyler Pearson 32-yard run, Nick Mazzie kick (Drive: 7 plays, 67 yards, 2:22; East Carolina 28–6)

Statistics	ARMY	ECU
First downs	12	23
Plays–yards	65–290	72–431
Rushes–yards	53–241	50–180
Passing yards	49	251
Passing: comp–att–int	6–12–0	15–22–1
Turnovers	1	2
Time of possession	34:02	25:58

Team	Category	Player	Statistics
Army	Passing	Dewayne Coleman	5/9, 36 yards
Army	Rushing	Noah Short	11 carries, 127 yards
Army	Receiving	Samari Howard	2 receptions, 26 yards
East Carolina	Passing	Katin Houser	15/22, 251 yards, 2 TD, INT
East Carolina	Rushing	London Montgomery	15 carries, 58 yards
East Carolina	Receiving	Anthony Smith	3 receptions, 87 yards, TD

=== at UAB ===
Army Black Knights (1–3) at UAB Blazers (2–2) – Game summary

Quarter	1	2	3	4	Total
Black Knights	0	10	7	14	31
Blazers	0	7	0	6	13

at Protective Stadium • Birmingham, AL

- Date: October 4
- Game time: 12:00 p.m. EDT
- Game weather: Sunny • Temperature: 73 °F (23 °C) • Wind: W at 8 miles per hour (13 km/h)
- Game attendance: 22,489
- Referee: Reid Jackson
- TV announcers (ESPNU): Matt Schumacker (play-by-play) and Dustin Fox (analyst)

Game information

First quarter

- No scoring plays

Second quarter

- (13:47) ARMY – Hayden Reed 3-yard run, Dawson Jones kick (Drive: 18 plays, 74 yards, 10:34; Army 7–0)
- (1:16) UAB – Xavier Daisy 1-yard pass from Jalen Kitna, Jonah Delange kick (Drive: 8 plays, 90 yards, 1:52; Tied 7–7)
- (0:02) ARMY – Dawson Jones 45-yard field goal (Drive: 8 plays, 40 yards, 1:08; Army 10–7)

Third quarter

- (5:11) ARMY – Cale Hellums 5-yard run, Dawson Jones kick (Drive: 9 plays, 80 yards, 4:56; Army 17–7)

Fourth quarter

- (14:18) ARMY – Cale Hellums 1-yard run, Dawson Jones kick (Drive: 5 plays, 12 yards, 2:36; Army 24–7)
- (4:10) ARMY – Cale Hellums 5-yard run, Dawson Jones kick (Drive: 4 plays, 20 yards, 1:35; Army 31–7)
- (0:54) UAB – Ryder Burton 1-yard run, pass failed (Drive: 12 plays, 79 yards, 3:11; Army 31–13)

Statistics	ARMY	UAB
First downs	17	16
Plays–yards	66–295	60–362
Rushes–yards	61–247	18–103
Passing yards	48	259
Passing: comp–att–int	2–5–0	24–42–1
Turnovers	0	2
Time of possession	36:41	23:19

Team	Category	Player	Statistics
Army	Passing	Cale Hellums	1/3, 41 yards
Army	Rushing	Cale Hellums	21 carries, 81 yards, 3 TD
Army	Receiving	Samari Howard	2 receptions, 48 yards
UAB	Passing	Jalen Kitna	24/42, 259 yards, TD, INT
UAB	Rushing	Jevon Jackson	12 carries, 89 yards
UAB	Receiving	Iverson Hooks	4 receptions, 71 yards

=== Charlotte ===
Charlotte 49ers (1–4) at Army Black Knights (2–3) – Game summary

Quarter	1	2	3	4	Total
49ers	0	0	0	7	7
Black Knights	7	10	7	0	24

at Michie Stadium • West Point, NY

- Date: October 11
- Game time: 12:00 p.m. EDT
- Game weather: Cloudy • Temperature: 64 °F (18 °C) • Wind: NE at 3 miles per hour (4.8 km/h)
- Game attendance: 31,172
- Referee: Steven Anderson
- TV announcers (CBSSN): Dave Ryan (play-by-play), Adam Breneman (analyst) and Tina Cervasio (sideline)

Game information

First quarter

- (3:40) ARMY – Cale Hellums 1-yard run, Dawson Jones kick (Drive: 9 plays, 80 yards, 5:06; Army 7–0)

Second quarter

- (3:39) ARMY – Carson Smith 5-yard run, Dawson Jones kick (Drive: 17 plays, 85 yards, 10:51; Army 14–0)
- (0:00) ARMY – Dawson Jones 38-yard field goal (Drive: 7 plays, 31 yards, 1:14; Army 17–0)

Third quarter

- (4:16) ARMY – Cale Hellums 1-yard run, Dawson Jones kick (Drive: 8 plays, 54 yards, 4:08; Army 24–0)

Fourth quarter

- (0:08) CLT – KD Hunter-Gibson 16-yard pass from Grayson Loftis, Liam Boyd kick (Drive: 8 plays, 59 yards, 1:46; Army 24–7)

Statistics	CLT	ARMY
First downs	11	20
Plays–yards	55–178	69–355
Rushes–yards	29–68	63–305
Passing yards	110	50
Passing: comp–att–int	16–26–0	2–6–0
Turnovers	1	1
Time of possession	22:06	37:54

Team	Category	Player	Statistics
Charlotte	Passing	Grayson Loftis	8/12, 68 yards, TD
Charlotte	Rushing	Rod Gainey Jr.	19 carries, 51 yards
Charlotte	Receiving	Sean Brown	4 receptions, 32 yards
Army	Passing	Cale Hellums	2/4, 50 yards
Army	Rushing	Cale Hellums	21 carries, 143 yards, 2 TD
Army	Receiving	Noah Short	1 reception, 44 yards

=== at Tulane ===
Army Black Knights (3–3) at Tulane Green Wave (5–1) – Game summary

Quarter	1	2	3	4	Total
Black Knights	0	3	7	7	17
Green Wave	0	3	7	14	24

at Yulman Stadium • New Orleans, LA

- Date: October 18
- Game time: 12:00 p.m. EDT
- Game weather: Sunny • Temperature: 84 °F (29 °C) • Wind: SE at 11 miles per hour (18 km/h)
- Game attendance: 20,027
- Referee: Charles Lamertina
- TV announcers (ESPNU): Courtney Lyle (play-by-play) and Rene Ingoglia (analyst)

Game information

First quarter

- No scoring plays.

Second quarter

- (1:49) TULN – Patrick Durkin 30-yard field goal (Drive: 15 plays, 75 yards, 5:42; Tulane 3–0)
- (0:23) ARMY – Dawson Jones 43-yard field goal (Drive: 6 plays, 49 yards, 1:26; Tied 3–3)

Third quarter

- (6:31) ARMY – Cale Hellums 1-yard run, Dawson Jones kick (Drive: 13 plays, 80 yards, 7:16; Army 10–3)
- (4:52) TULN – Jake Retzlaff 37-yard run, Patrick Durkin kick (Drive: 4 plays, 58 yards, 1:30; Tied 10–10)

Fourth quarter

- (5:54) ARMY – Cale Hellums 1-yard run, Dawson Jones kick (Drive: 14 plays, 80 yards, 8:16; Army 17–10)
- (1:54) TULN – Bryce Bohanon 12-yard pass from Jake Retzlaff, Patrick Durkin kick (Drive: 11 plays, 75 yards, 4:00; Tied 17–17)
- (0:27) TULN – Shazz Preston 26-yard pass from Jake Retzlaff, Patrick Durkin kick (Drive: 6 plays, 75 yards, 1:01; Tulane 24–17)

Statistics	ARMY	TULN
First downs	21	23
Plays–yards	73–358	58–402
Rushes–yards	63–233	29–141
Passing yards	125	261
Passing: comp–att–int	7–10–0	22–29–1
Turnovers	0	1
Time of possession	38:58	21:02

Team	Category	Player	Statistics
Army	Passing	Cale Hellums	7/10, 125 yards
Army	Rushing	Cale Hellums	38 carries, 163 yards, 2 TD
Army	Receiving	Brady Anderson	4 receptions, 97 yards
Tulane	Passing	Jake Retzlaff	22/29, 261 yards, 2 TD, INT
Tulane	Rushing	Jake Retzlaff	8 carries, 62 yards, TD
Tulane	Receiving	Shazz Preston	5 receptions, 86 yards, TD

=== at Air Force (Commander-in-Chief's Trophy) ===
Army Black Knights (3–4) at Air Force Falcons (2–5) – Game summary

Quarter	1	2	3	4	Total
Black Knights	7	3	0	10	20
Falcons	3	0	7	7	17

at Falcon Stadium • USAF Academy, CO

- Date: November 1
- Game time: 1:00 p.m. EDT
- Game weather: Sunny • Temperature: 41 °F (5 °C) • Wind: NW at 7 miles per hour (11 km/h)
- Game attendance: 39,441
- Referee: Tim Rich
- TV announcers (CBS): Rich Waltz (play-by-play), Ross Tucker (analyst) and Tiffany Blackmon (sideline)

Game information

First quarter

- (2:25) AFA – Reagan Tubbs 52-yard field goal (Drive: 11 plays, 36 yards, 6:18; Air Force 3–0)
- (0:05) ARMY – Noah Short 40-yard pass from Cale Hellums, Dawson Jones kick (Drive: 4 plays, 75 yards, 2:20; Army 7–3)

Second quarter

- (0:35) ARMY – Dawson Jones 44-yard field goal (Drive: 7 plays, 14 yards, 1:48; Army 10–3)

Third quarter

- (0:00) AFA – Liam Szarka 3-yard run, Reagan Tubbs kick (Drive: 12 plays, 65 yards, 7:05; Tied 10–10)

Fourth quarter

- (7:00) ARMY – Cale Hellums 10-yard run, Dawson Jones kick (Drive: 13 plays, 75 yards, 8:00; Army 17–10)
- (1:26) AFA – Liam Szarka 2-yard run, Reagan Tubbs kick (Drive: 3 plays, 26 yards, 0:53; Tied 17–17)
- (0:00) ARMY – Dawson Jones 27-yard field goal (Drive: 8 plays, 63 yards, 1:26; Army 20–17)

Statistics	ARMY	AFA
First downs	15	23
Plays–yards	54–295	68–335
Rushes–yards	45–193	50–174
Passing yards	102	161
Passing: comp–att–int	5–9–0	13–18–2
Turnovers	0	3
Time of possession	25:56	34:04

Team	Category	Player	Statistics
Army	Passing	Cale Hellums	5/9, 102 yards, TD
Army	Rushing	Cale Hellums	26 carries, 98 yards, TD
Army	Receiving	Noah Short	3 receptions, 52 yards, TD
Air Force	Passing	Liam Szarka	13/17, 161 yards, 2 INT
Air Force	Rushing	Liam Szarka	29 carries, 91 yards, 2 TD
Air Force	Receiving	Jonah Dawson	4 receptions, 67 yards

=== Temple ===
Temple Owls (5–4) at Army Black Knights (4–4) – Game summary

Quarter	1	2	3	4	Total
Owls	0	10	3	0	13
Black Knights	0	7	7	0	14

at Michie Stadium • West Point, NY

- Date: November 8
- Game time: 12:00 p.m. EST
- Game weather: Sunny • Temperature: 60 °F (16 °C) • Wind: at 8 miles per hour (13 km/h)
- Game attendance: 30,594
- Referee: Charles Lamertina
- TV announcers (CBSSN): Dave Ryan (play-by-play), Adam Breneman (analyst) and Tina Cervasio (sideline)

Game information

First quarter

- No scoring plays

Second quarter

- (11:19) ARMY – Jake Rendina 7-yard run, Dawson Jones kick (Drive: 11 plays, 73 yards, 7:49; Army 7–0)
- (4:03) TEM – Colin Chase 12-yard pass from Evan Simon, Carl Hardin kick (Drive: 13 plays, 75 yards, 7:16; Tied 7–7)
- (0:01) TEM – Carl Hardin 24-yard field goal (Drive: 6 plays, 47 yards, 0:26; Temple 10–7)

Third quarter

- (6:39) ARMY – Cale Hellums 3-yard run, Dawson Jones kick (Drive: 14 plays, 75 yards, 8:21; Army 14–10)
- (0:22) TEM – Carl Hardin 31-yard field goal (Drive: 12 plays, 68 yards, 6:11; Temple 14–13)

Fourth quarter

- No scoring plays

Statistics	TEM	ARMY
First downs	16	20
Plays–yards	46–268	66–250
Rushes–yards	21–111	63–224
Passing yards	157	26
Passing: comp–att–int	15–25–0	1–3–0
Turnovers	0	0
Time of possession	22:22	37:38

Team	Category	Player	Statistics
Temple	Passing	Evan Simon	15/25, 157 yards, 1 TD
Temple	Rushing	Jay Ducker	8 carries, 46 yards
Temple	Receiving	Peter Clarke	2 receptions, 51 yards
Army	Passing	Cale Hellums	1/3, 26 yards
Army	Rushing	Cale Hellums	36 carries, 118 yards, 1 TD
Army	Receiving	Parker Poloskey	1 reception, 26 yards

=== Tulsa ===
Tulsa Golden Hurricane (3–7) at Army Black Knights (5–4) – Game summary

Quarter	1	2	3	4	Total
Golden Hurricane	7	7	0	12	26
Black Knights	7	15	3	0	25

at Michie Stadium • West Point, New York

- Date: November 22
- Game time: 12:00 p.m. EST
- Game weather: Cloudy • Temperature: 46 °F (8 °C) • Wind: at 5 miles per hour (8.0 km/h)
- Game attendance: 28,705
- Referee: Reid Jackson
- TV announcers (CBSSN): Dave Ryan (play-by-play), Adam Breneman (analyst) and Tina Cervasio (sideline)

Game information

First quarter

- (12:23) TLSA – Dominic Richardson 3-yard run, Seth Morgan kick (Drive: 6 plays, 67 yards, 2:37; Tulsa 7–0)
- (11:34) ARMY – Cale Hellums 31-yard run, Dawson Jones kick (Drive: 2 plays, 75 yards, 0:49; Tied 7–7)

Second quarter

- (14:01) TLSA – Ajay Allen 7-yard run, Seth Morgan kick (Drive: 8 plays, 74 yards, 3:55; Tulsa 14–7)
- (5:47) ARMY – Cale Hellums 5-yard run, Cale Hellums pass (Drive: 13 plays, 70 yards, 8:08; Army 15–14)
- (0:24) ARMY – Cale Hellums 5-yard run, Dawson Jones kick (Drive: 9 plays, 55 yards, 3:09; Army 22–14)

Third quarter

- (7:03) ARMY – Dawson Jones 33-yard field goal (Drive: 15 plays, 60 yards, 7:51; Army 25–14)

Fourth quarter

- (4:17) TLSA – Seth Morgan 48-yard field goal (Drive: 11 plays, 30 yards, 4:38; Army 25–17)
- (1:53) TLSA – Josh Smith 8-yard pass from Baylor Hayes, pass failed (Drive: 5 plays, 40 yards, 1:32; Army 25–23)
- (0:12) TLSA – Seth Morgan 27-yard field goal (Drive: 9 plays, 52 yards, 1:24; Tulsa 26–25)

Statistics	TLSA	ARMY
First downs	26	19
Plays–yards	71–497	65–311
Rushes–yards	38–230	55–247
Passing yards	267	64
Passing: comp–att–int	20–33–0	6–10–1
Turnovers	2	1
Time of possession	25:24	34:36

Team	Category	Player	Statistics
Tulsa	Passing	Baylor Hayes	20/31, 267 yards, TD
Tulsa	Rushing	Dominic Richardson	28 carries, 203 yards, TD
Tulsa	Receiving	Zion Steptoe	5 receptions, 76 yards
Army	Passing	Cale Hellums	6/10, 64 yards, INT
Army	Rushing	Cale Hellums	32 carries, 159 yards, 3 TD
Army	Receiving	Noah Short	4 receptions, 47 yards

=== at UTSA ===
Army Black Knights (5–5) at UTSA Roadrunners (6–5) – Game summary

Quarter	1	2	3	4	Total
Black Knights	0	17	3	7	27
Roadrunners	7	3	0	14	24

at Alamodome • San Antonio, TX

- Date: November 29
- Game time: 3:30 p.m. EST
- Game weather: None (played indoors)
- Game attendance: 22,620
- Referee: Kevin Randall
- TV announcers (ESPN+): Ted Emrich (play-by-play), LaDarrin McLane (analyst) and Natalie Kalibat (sideline)

Game information

First quarter

- (7:43) UTSA – Patrick Overmyer 4-yard pass from David Amador II, Michael Petro kick (Drive: 9 plays, 81 yards, 5:06; UTSA 7–0)

Second quarter

- (14:15) UTSA – Michael Petro 32-yard field goal (Drive: 11 plays, 31 yards, 5:14; UTSA 10–0)
- (13:22) ARMY – Noah Short 81-yard run, Dawson Jones kick (Drive: 2 plays, 83 yards, 0:48; UTSA 10–7)
- (2:59) ARMY – Dawson Jones 27-yard field goal (Drive: 14 plays, 87 yards, 8:02; Tied 10–10)
- (0:46) ARMY – Jaydan Mayes 73-yard interception return, Dawson Jones kick (Army 17–10)

Third quarter

- (4:27) ARMY – Dawson Jones 37-yard field goal (Drive: 14 plays, 37 yards, 7:42; Army 20–10)

Fourth quarter

- (14:55) UTSA – Patrick Overmyer 8-yard pass from Owen McCown, Michael Petro kick (Drive: 5 plays, 59 yards, 2:14; Army 20–17)
- (9:10) UTSA – Jamel Hardy Jr. 7-yard pass from Owen McCown, Michael Petro kick (Drive: 7 plays, 65 yards, 3:23; UTSA 24–20)
- (2:49) ARMY – Parker Poloskey 4-yard pass from Cale Hellums, Dawson Jones kick (Drive: 13 plays, 75 yards, 6:21; Army 27–24)

Statistics	ARMY	UTSA
First downs	16	18
Plays–yards	61–303	66–386
Rushes–yards	50–233	24–116
Passing yards	70	270
Passing: comp–att–int	5–11–0	28–42–1
Turnovers	0	1
Time of possession	33:07	26:53

Team	Category	Player	Statistics
Army	Passing	Cale Hellums	4/10, 38 yards, TD
Army	Rushing	Noah Short	14 carries, 127 yards, TD
Army	Receiving	Brady Anderson	1 reception, 32 yards
UTSA	Passing	Owen McCown	27/40, 266 yards, 2 TD, INT
UTSA	Rushing	Robert Henry Jr.	13 carries, 62 yards
UTSA	Receiving	Devin McCuin	7 receptions, 86 yards

=== vs. Navy (Army–Navy Game) ===
(126th Army-Navy Game)
Army Black Knights (6–5) vs Navy Midshipmen (9–2) – Game summary

Quarter	1	2	3	4	Total
Black Knights	0	13	3	0	16
Midshipmen	7	0	3	7	17

at M&T Bank Stadium • Baltimore, MD

- Date: December 13
- Game time: 3:00 p.m. EST
- Game weather: Sunny • Temperature: 41 °F (5 °C) • Wind: W at 5 miles per hour (8.0 km/h)
- Game attendance: 70,936
- Referee: Tim Rich
- TV announcers (CBS): Brad Nessler (play-by-play), Gary Danielson (analyst), and Jenny Dell (sideline reporter)

Game information

First quarter

- (7:16) NAVY – Blake Horvath 5-yard run, Nathan Kirkwood kick (Drive: 13 plays, 75 yards, 7:44; Navy 7–0)

Second quarter

- (14:55) ARMY – Cale Hellums 2-yard run, Dawson Jones kick (Drive: 13 plays, 75 yards, 7:21; Tied 7–7)
- (3:45) ARMY – Dawson Jones 20-yard field goal (Drive: 14 plays, 63 yards, 8:52; Army 10–7)
- (0:03) ARMY – Dawson Jones 45-yard field goal (Drive: 4 plays, 27 yards, 0:20; Army 13–7)

Third quarter

- (9:39) ARMY – Dawson Jones 48-yard field goal (Drive: 4 plays, 2 yards, 2:09; Army 16–7)
- (2:59) NAVY – Nathan Kirkwood 21-yard field goal (Drive: 13 plays, 72 yards, 6:40; Army 16–10)

Fourth quarter

- (1:54) NAVY – Eli Heidenreich 8-yard pass from Blake Horvath, Nathan Kirkwood kick (Drive: 9 plays, 50 yards, 4:47; Navy 17–16)

Statistics	ARMY	NAVY
First downs	11	17
Plays–yards	44–202	66–272
Rushes–yards	34–120	52–190
Passing yards	82	82
Passing: comp–att–int	5–10–1	7–14–1
Turnovers	1	2
Time of possession	25:25	34:35

Team	Category	Player	Statistics
Army	Passing	Cale Hellums	5/10, 82 yards, INT
Army	Rushing	Cale Hellums	25 carries, 100 yards, TD
Army	Receiving	Noah Short	3 receptions, 51 yards
Navy	Passing	Blake Horvath	7/14, 82 yards, TD, INT
Navy	Rushing	Blake Horvath	34 carries, 107 yards, TD
Navy	Receiving	Eli Heidenreich	6 receptions, 72 yards

=== vs. UConn (Fenway Bowl) ===
2025 Wasabi Fenway Bowl
UConn Huskies (9-3) vs. Army Black Knights (6-6) – Game summary

Quarter	1	2	3	4	Total
Huskies	7	3	0	6	16
Black Knights	7	7	13	14	41

at Fenway Park • Boston, MA

- Date: December 27
- Game time: 2:15 p.m. EST
- Game weather: Sunny • Temperature: 23 °F (−5 °C) • Wind: SW at 10 miles per hour (16 km/h)
- Game attendance: 22,461
- Referee: James Carter
- TV announcers (ESPN): Wes Durham (play-by-play), Steve Addazio (analyst) and Dana Boyle (sideline)

Game information

First Quarter

- (9:17) CONN – Cam Edwards 12-yard run, Chris Freeman kick (Drive: 5 plays, 54 yards, 2:08; UConn 7–0)
- (6:01) ARMY – Noah Short 40-yard pass from Cale Hellums, Dawson Jones kick (Drive: 6 plays, 75 yards, 3:16; Tied 7–7)

Second Quarter

- (3:04) ARMY – Godspower Nwawuihe 43-yard run, Dawson Jones kick (Drive: 10 plays, 90 yards, 5:57; Army 14–7)
- (0:00) CONN – Chris Freeman 49-yard field goal (Drive: 10 plays, 51 yards, 2:58; Army 14–10)

Third Quarter

- (14:04) ARMY – Godspower Nwawuihe 70-yard run, kick failed (Drive: 2 plays, 75 yards, 0:56; Army 20–10)
- (6:22) ARMY – Cale Hellums 1-yard run, Dawson Jones kick (Drive: 11 plays, 57 yards, 6:48; Army 27–10)

Fourth Quarter

- (8:18) ARMY – Cale Hellums 6-yard run, Dawson Jones kick (Drive: 15 plays, 89 yards, 8:22; Army 34–10)
- (5:47) CONN – Ksaan Farrar 11-yard run, pass failed (Drive: 6 plays, 58 yards, 2:19; Army 34–16)
- (1:20) ARMY – Carson Smith 6-yard run, Dawson Jones kick (Drive: 9 plays, 42 yards, 4:25; Army 41–16)

Statistics	CONN	ARMY
First downs	14	23
Plays–yards	47–267	65–476
Rushes–yards	30–183	56–368
Passing yards	84	108
Passing: comp–att–int	11–17–0	7–9–0
Turnovers	0	1
Time of possession	23:45	36:15

Team	Category	Player	Statistics
UConn	Passing	Ksaan Farrar	11/17, 84 yards
UConn	Rushing	Cam Edwards	11 carries, 108 yards, TD
UConn	Receiving	Reymello Murphy	7 receptions, 51 yards
Army	Passing	Cale Hellums	7/8, 108 yards, TD
Army	Rushing	Godspower Nwawuihe	12 carries, 171 yards, 2 TD
Army	Receiving	Noah Short	7 receptions, 108 yards, TD

== Coaching staff ==
Army Black Knights
Name	Position	Consecutive season at Army in current position	Previous position
Jeff Monken	Head coach	12th	Georgia Southern head coach (2010–2013)
Cody Worley	Offensive coordinator and quarterbacks coach	2nd	Army run game coordinator and quarterbacks coach (2023)
Nate Woody	Defensive coordinator	5th	Michigan defensive analyst (2020)
Sean Saturnio	Special teams coordinator	6th	Army tight ends coach (2018–2019)
John Loose	Assistant head coach and outside linebackers coach	6th	Army defensive coordinator (2019)
Mike Viti	Offensive line coach	4th	Army running backs coach (2017–2021)
Cheston Blackshear	Tight ends coach	2nd	Florida offensive quality control (2022–2023)
Sean Cronin	Defensive line coach	4th	Colorado State linebackers coach (2020–2021)
Daryl Dixon	Cornerbacks coach	7th	Army outside linebackers coach (2016–2018)
Matt Drinkall	Offensive line coach	2nd	Army co-offensive coordinator and offensive line coach (2023)
Blake Powers	Running backs coach	2nd	Army tight ends coach (2023)
Aaron Smith	Wide receivers coach	4th	UConn wide receivers coach (2017–2021)
Drew Thatcher	H-backs coach	2nd	Army offensive coordinator (2023)
Danny Verpaele	Safeties coach	3rd	Kennesaw State defensive coordinator and defensive backs coach (2020–2022)
Justin Weaver	Inside linebackers coach	3rd	USMAPS (NY) head coach (2022)
Collin Shank	Defensive quality control	3rd	Army graduate assistant (2022)
Tristan Yeomans	Offensive quality control	3rd	Charlotte special teams assistant (2022)
