= Gordon Sammis =

American football coach

Current position
- Title: Offensive coordinator
- Team: TCU
- Conference: Big 12

Biographical details
- Education: University of Virginia (2007, 2012)

Playing career
- 2003–2007: Virginia
- Position: Offensive lineman

Coaching career (HC unless noted)
- 2010–2012: Virginia (GA)
- 2013–2014: Columbia (OL/TE)
- 2015–2016: VMI (OL)
- 2017–2018: Lafayette (OL)
- 2019–2021: William & Mary (OL)
- 2022–2023: UConn (OL)
- 2024–2025: UConn (OC)
- 2025: UConn (interim HC)
- 2026–present: TCU (OC)

Head coaching record
- Overall: 0–1
- Bowls: 0–1

Gordon Sammis is an American college football coach who is currently the offensive coordinator for the TCU Horned Frogs.

== Playing career ==
Sammis played high school football at Immaculata High School in Somerville, New Jersey. He played in the U.S. Army All-American Bowl.

== Coaching career ==
Sammis got his first collegiate coaching job in 2010 as a graduate assistant at his alma mater Virginia. Going into the 2013 season, he was hired by Columbia to serve as the team's offensive line and tight ends coach. In 2015, Sammis joined VMI as the offensive line coach. In 2017, he was hired by Lafayette to serve as the team's offensive line coach. Going into the 2019 season, Sammis joined William & Mary, to coach the team's offensive line. Before the start of the 2022 season, Sammis was hired as the offensive line coach for the UConn Huskies. Heading into the 2024 season, he was promoted by UConn to serve as the team's offensive coordinator. On November 26, 2025, Sammis was named the Huskies interim head coach after Jim Mora left to take the Colorado State head coaching job. On December 11, 2025, TCU hired Sammis to serve as their offensive coordinator beginning in 2026.

== Head coaching record ==
Year	Team	Overall	Conference	Standing	Bowl/playoffs
UConn Huskies (NCAA Division I FBS independent) (2025)
2025	UConn	0–1			L Fenway
UConn:		0–1			
Total:		0–1			
