= Redshirt (college sports) =

Delay for college athletics sports eligibility

In college athletics in the United States, redshirt is a delay or suspension of an athlete's participation in order to lengthen their period of eligibility. Typically, a student's athletic eligibility in a given sport is four seasons, aligning with the four years of academic classes typically required to earn a bachelor's degree at an American college or university. However, in a redshirt year, student athletes may attend classes at the college or university, practice with an athletic team, and "suit up" (wear a team uniform) for play – but they may compete in only a limited number of games (see "Use of status" section). Using this mechanism, a student athlete (traditionally) has at most five academic years to use the four years of eligibility, thus becoming what is termed a fifth-year senior. Due to the COVID-19 pandemic, an additional year of eligibility was granted by the NCAA to student athletes who met certain criteria. Student athletes who qualified had up to six academic years to make use of their four years of eligibility, taking into consideration the extra year provided due to exceptional circumstances.

In the Philippines either in its own NCAA or the UAAP, a player redshirting as part of a school transferring process is said to be serving residency.

== Etymology and origin ==
According to Merriam-Webster and Webster's Dictionary, the term redshirt comes from the red jersey commonly worn by such a player in practice scrimmages against the regulars.

The origin of the term redshirt was likely from Warren Alfson of the University of Nebraska who, in 1937, asked to practice but not play and wore a Nebraska red shirt without a number. The term is used as a verb, noun, and noun adjunct. For example, sentences including all three uses could be "A coach may choose to redshirt an athlete, who is then referred to as a redshirt" and "A redshirt freshman refers to an athlete in the first year of participation, after a redshirt non-participatory year".

== Terminology ==
The term redshirt freshman indicates a student-athlete who is an academic sophomore (provided enough credits were earned during the athlete's true freshman year) whose participation in athletics as a true freshman did not exceed the limits that would require the eligibility clock to start. The following year, the student-athlete is typically an academic junior and called a redshirt sophomore for athletics purposes, for using a second year of athletic eligibility. A redshirt senior is a fifth-year undergraduate student using a fourth year of eligibility. Such a student-athlete may actually be participating in a fifth season, but the participation in one of those seasons was minimal and did not use a year of eligibility. A fifth-year senior is a student athlete who is a fifth-year undergraduate student who has five years of eligibility. Student-athletes who were matriculated while college athletics were disrupted by the COVID-19 pandemic were granted additional eligibility by the NCAA, even if their participation was not affected in a significant way.

A true freshman is a student-athlete who is in their first year as an undergraduate student. A true freshman may be a full participant in the sport or may be practicing, dressing for games, and either playing sparingly or not at all with the intention to redshirt and become a redshirt freshman the following year.

== Rationale ==
Student athletes just out of high school may not be ready for the academic and athletic demands at the university level. Redshirting provides the opportunity, with tutoring, to take classes for an academic year and become accustomed to the academic and physical rigors of university athletics. They may also redshirt to undergo a year of practice with a team prior to participating in competition. In American college football, a student athlete may redshirt to work towards increasing physical size, strength, and stamina during their final phases of physical maturation. Athletes may also redshirt to learn the team playbook, as many college teams run more complex formations and executions than high school teams.

Athletes may be asked to redshirt if they would have little or no opportunity to compete as an academic freshman, which is a common occurrence in team sports, where there is already an established upperclassman and/or too much depth in skill or ability at a particular position. Redshirting allows the coaching staff the flexibility to use the athlete in competition for a full four years instead of just three years.

Athletes may also choose to redshirt if they do not want to play the rest of the season causing them to lose their eligibility, and possibly harm chances at future professional sports endeavors. Most athletes who do this tend to enter the transfer portal after with some exceptions. Examples of those who have done this under certain circumstances include Donaven McCulley, D'Eriq King, Jahiem Oatis, Bear Alexander, and Byrun Parham.

== Use of status ==
While the redshirt status may be conferred by a coach at the beginning of the year, it is not confirmed until the end of the season, and more specifically, it does not rule an athlete ineligible in advance to participate in the season. If an athlete shows great talent, or there are injuries on the team, the coach may remove the redshirt status and allow the athlete to participate in competition for the remainder of the year.

The first athlete known to extend his eligibility in the modern era of redshirting was Warren Alfson of the University of Nebraska in 1937. Alfson requested that he be allowed to sit out his sophomore season due to the number of experienced players ahead of him. In addition, he had not started college until several years after graduating from high school, and thus felt he needed more preparation. The year off greatly benefited him; Alfson was All-Big Six Conference in 1939 and an All-American guard in 1940.

In the NJCAA system, use of redshirt may be pointless, as most students graduate in two years. However, the NCAA counts any collegiate sports participation in any affiliation organization, including the NJCAA, NCCAA, USCAA and NAIA as using a year of NCAA eligibility.

On December 18, 2024, a United States District Court issued a preliminary injunction in favor of Diego Pavia after preliminarily finding that NCAA Division I by-laws 12.02.06 and 14.3.3 and the rules in the NCAA Division I 2024–25 Manual constitute a commercial agreement, can be replaced by a less restrictive alternative and cause irreparable harm to Pavia. The injunction prevents the NCAA from enforcing by-law 12.02.6 and rule 12.11.4.2 against Pavia, Vanderbilt University or any other Division I institution for which Pavia chooses to play football in 2025. By-law 12.02.6 says

Intercollegiate competition is considered to have occurred when a student-athlete in either a two-year or a four-year collegiate institution does any of the following:

(a) Represents the institution in any contest against outside competition, regardless of how the competition is classified (e.g., scrimmage, exhibition or joint practice session with another institution's team) or whether the student is enrolled in a minimum full-time program of studies;

(b) Competes in the uniform of the institution, or, during the academic year, uses any apparel (excluding apparel no longer used by the institution) received from the institution that includes institutional identification; or

(c) Competes and receives expenses (e.g., transportation, meals, housing, entry fees) from the institution for the competition.

Rule 12.11.4.2, commonly known as the Rule of Restitution, provides retroactive punishments directed at both a student-athlete and the institution for which he or she competes, when a student-athlete, who is ineligible under NCAA rules, is permitted to compete in accordance with an injunction that is later voluntarily vacated, stayed or reversed, or if it is finally determined by a court that injunctive relief was not justified.

Diego Pavia played for two seasons at New Mexico Military, an NJCAA institution. One of those two seasons is not counted by the NCAA for determining eligibility, because it is exempted by the NCAA's blanket COVID waiver. Counting the second year at New Mexico Military along with two seasons at New Mexico State (2022 and 2023) and one season at Vanderbilt (2024) would mean his eligibility was exhausted at the conclusion of the 2024 football season. The injunction effectively prohibits the NCAA from including Pavia's participation at New Mexico Military in determining his eligibility, which means he is eligible for 2025. Forms of punishment available under rule 12.11.4.2 include vacating the student-athlete's athletic records as well as those of the institution achieved while the student-athlete participated, vacating team victories in which the student-athlete participated, forfeiture of awards presented to both the student-athlete and the team, revocation of postseason eligibility for the team and financial penalties assessed to the institution. The injunction forbids the NCAA from taking any such actions.

Diego Pavia's injunction is not a final determination of the judicial system as to whether the NCAA may count participation by a student-athlete at non-NCAA institutions in determining eligibility. The injunction was issued based on the court's analysis of the available facts and a conclusion that the eligibility restrictions imposed by the NCAA appear to likely violate the Sherman Antitrust Act and will cause irreparable harm to Pavia, if he were not permitted to play Division I football in 2025, since he estimated he could earn approximately US$1 million in name, image and likeness (NIL) compensation by playing. The court noted in the injunction that it agreed with the NCAA that a more robust analysis of the eligibility rules may reveal that they do not violate the Sherman Antitrust Act. However, the court did not expect final resolution of the litigation to occur in time for Pavia to play the 2025 football season.

While the injunction specifically applies only to Diego Pavia and does not mean that student-athletes may ignore non-NCAA participation when determining NCAA eligibility, should Pavia ultimately prevail, such outcome could force the NCAA to revisit its eligibility criteria. In the interim, the NCAA Division I board of directors approved a temporary blanket waiver for student-athletes who competed at a non-NCAA school for one or more years and would have exhausted their NCAA eligibility following the 2024–25 academic year under existing rules. Such student-athletes are granted an additional year of eligibility for the 2025–26 academic year.

The NCAA appealed the injunction in the Pavia case. However, since it had already granted the relief Pavia sought through the blanket waiver, the court dismissed the appeal for lack of jurisdiction, since the matter had become moot.

In January 2017, the trade association for college football coaches, the American Football Coaches Association, proposed a change to that sport's eligibility rules that maintains the current model of four years of play in five years, but significantly changes the redshirt rule. Under the proposal, medical redshirts would be eliminated, but redshirt status would not be lost unless a player participated in more than four games in a season. The proposal, which was unanimously passed by the AFCA subcommittees for all three NCAA divisions, was approved by the NCAA Division I Council in June 2018, taking effect with the 2018 college football season. The original proposal was to have been retroactive, meaning that players with athletic eligibility remaining who had played in four or fewer games in a given season would have effectively received one extra season of eligibility, but the final passed proposal was not retroactive.

Shortly after the start of the 2024 season, NCAA Division I (both FBS and FCS) adopted a change to redshirt rules. The four-game limit now applies only to regular-season games. Conference championship games, bowl games, the FCS playoffs, and the College Football Playoff no longer count against the limit.

Generally, eligibility must be used up within six years of enrolling at an eligible NCAA institution. Redshirts and medical redshirt eligibility deferrals cannot go beyond this six-year period. This rule does not apply to other collegiate sports organizations, like the NAIA, where nontraditional students are allowed to compete. In the NCAA, use of various eligibility deferral techniques can lead to situations wherein an athlete has been an athlete for much longer than four years. Because the NCAA gave a free season of eligibility to student-athletes affected by disruptions brought on by COVID-19, this led to many athletes competing in a seventh season during the 2021–22 academic year. One example is Summer Allen of Weber State, whose competitive college career spanned nine seasons. She competed in both the 2013 and 2021 NCAA Women's Division I Cross Country Championship. Her eligibility was extended by going on an 18-month LDS Church mission that spanned two years of eligibility, redshirting one year, having a pregnancy one year, and losing a season due to COVID.

Before the 2023 season, NCAA Division II followed the redshirt rules used in D-I before 2018. The Division II Presidents Council voted in October 2022 to support a proposed change in redshirt rules for football, which would allow players in that sport in their first year of college attendance to play up to three games without losing a year of eligibility. This rule was approved by the D-II football membership at the 2023 NCAA Convention and took effect with the 2023 season.

== Other colors ==
A special case involves the eligibility of an athlete who loses the majority of a season to injury, popularly known as a medical redshirt. A hardship waiver may be granted to those athletes who sustain a major injury while appearing in less than 30% of competitions and have not participated after the midpoint of a season. For the purposes of eligibility, athletes granted such a waiver are treated as though they did not compete in that season.

In 2016, a new status could be applied to prospective student athletes, dubbed an academic redshirt. That year, the NCAA started enforcing new, stricter admissions requirements for incoming athletic freshmen. Under these new requirements, a student athlete who meets a school's own academic admission requirements but does not meet the NCAA requirement of a 2.3 GPA across four years, may enter school as an academic redshirt. This student can receive an athletic scholarship and practice with the team, but may not participate in competition. An academic redshirt does not lose a year of eligibility, and may later take an injury redshirt if needed. Finally, as long as an academic redshirt completes nine academic credit hours in their first semester they may then compete in their second year free of restrictions.

An athlete may also use a "grayshirt" year, in which the athlete attends school as neither a full-time student nor the recipient of a scholarship. The athlete is an unofficial member of the team and does not participate in practices, games, or receive financial assistance from the athletic department. One example is an athlete who is injured right before college and requires an entire year to recuperate. Rather than waste the redshirt, the athlete can attend school as a part-time student and join the team later. This is also used by athletes with religious obligations, serving in the military, or completing missionary work that keeps them out of school for a season. Any eligibility lost during this time is deferred to future seasons. This is commonly used by adherents of the Church of Jesus Christ of Latter-day Saints; the church's young men are strongly encouraged to go on two-year missions, and young women are allowed but not expected to serve as such for 18 months.

"Blueshirt" athletes are those that the NCAA does not classify as a "recruited student-athlete". They have never made an official visit to the school, met with the school's athletic employees, had more than one phone call with them, or received a scholarship offer. These athletes are walk-ons, but can receive scholarships after enrolling; although they are immediately eligible to compete, their scholarships count for the school's quota in the following year. The New Mexico State Aggies football program was the first to blueshirt in the early 2000s; other football programs include Oklahoma State.

A pinkshirt refers to a female athlete who misses a season due to pregnancy. The pinkshirt is only applicable if they do not compete during that season. Eligibility is deferred to the next year.

== Outside the United States ==
In the Philippine National Collegiate Athletic Association (NCAA) and University Athletic Association of the Philippines (UAAP), a student athlete moving from one member school to another are required to "serve residency" or sit-out for at least one season before they can represent their new school. Prior to 2015 when Republic Act 10676 was passed, students are mandated to serve two years of residency. In the UAAP, undergoing residency will shorten an athlete's period of eligibility or playing years, in the NCAA it does not.

== See also ==
- Postgraduate year
- Reclassification (education), repeating a year in middle school or high school to grow physically and academically
