= Bryun Parham =

American football player

No. 6 – UConn Huskies
- Position: Linebacker
- Class: Redshirt Senior

Personal information
- Listed height: 5 ft 11 in (1.80 m)
- Listed weight: 221 lb (100 kg)

Career information
- High school: Long Beach Polytechnic (Long Beach, California)
- College: San Jose State (2021–2023); Washington (2024); UConn (2025–present)
- Stats at ESPN

Bryun Parham is an American football linebacker for the UConn Huskies. He previously played for the San Jose State Spartans and for the Washington Huskies.

== Early life ==
Parham attended high school at Long Beach Polytechnic located in Long Beach, California. Coming out of high school, he was rated as a three-star recruit, where he committed to play college football for the San Jose State Spartans.

== College career ==
=== San Jose State ===
Parham finished his freshman season in 2021, playing in seven games, where he notched 19 tackles with one being for a loss. In the 2022 season, he recorded 74 tackles with five going for a loss, and three sacks. During the 2023 season, Parham totaled 106 tackles with five being for a loss, two and a half sacks, three pass deflections, an interception, two fumble recoveries, and a forced fumble. After the conclusion of the 2023 season, he decided to enter his name into the NCAA transfer portal.

=== Washington ===
Parham transferred to play for the Washington Huskies. After just four games and one start, he decided to opt-out of the season and redshirt to enter the NCAA transfer portal, after totaling 11 tackles, a forced fumble, and a pass deflection.

=== UConn ===
Parham transferred to play for the UConn Huskies. In week one of the 2025 season, he recorded seven tackles with two and a half being for a loss, and a sack, in a season opening win over Central Connecticut. In week six, Parham totaled nine tackles, a sack, and a forced fumble in a victory over FIU. In week eight, he tallied 14 tackles and two sacks, in a win against Boston College. In week eleven, he notched a career-high 16 tackles, along with a sack, a forced fumble, and an interception in an upset win over Duke. For his performance during the 2025 season, he was named a semifinalist for the Walter Camp Player of the Year award.

== Professional career ==
Pre-draft measurables
Height	Weight	Arm length	Hand span	Wingspan	40-yard dash	10-yard split	20-yard split	20-yard shuttle	Vertical jump	Broad jump	Bench press
5 ft 11 1/4 in (1.81 m)	221 lb (100 kg)	29 1/8 in (0.74 m)	8 1/2 in (0.22 m)	6 ft 0 1/8 in (1.83 m)	4.78 s	1.67 s	2.75 s	4.65 s	28.0 in (0.71 m)	9 ft 7 in (2.92 m)	16 reps
All values from Pro Day
