= Cale Hellums =

American football player

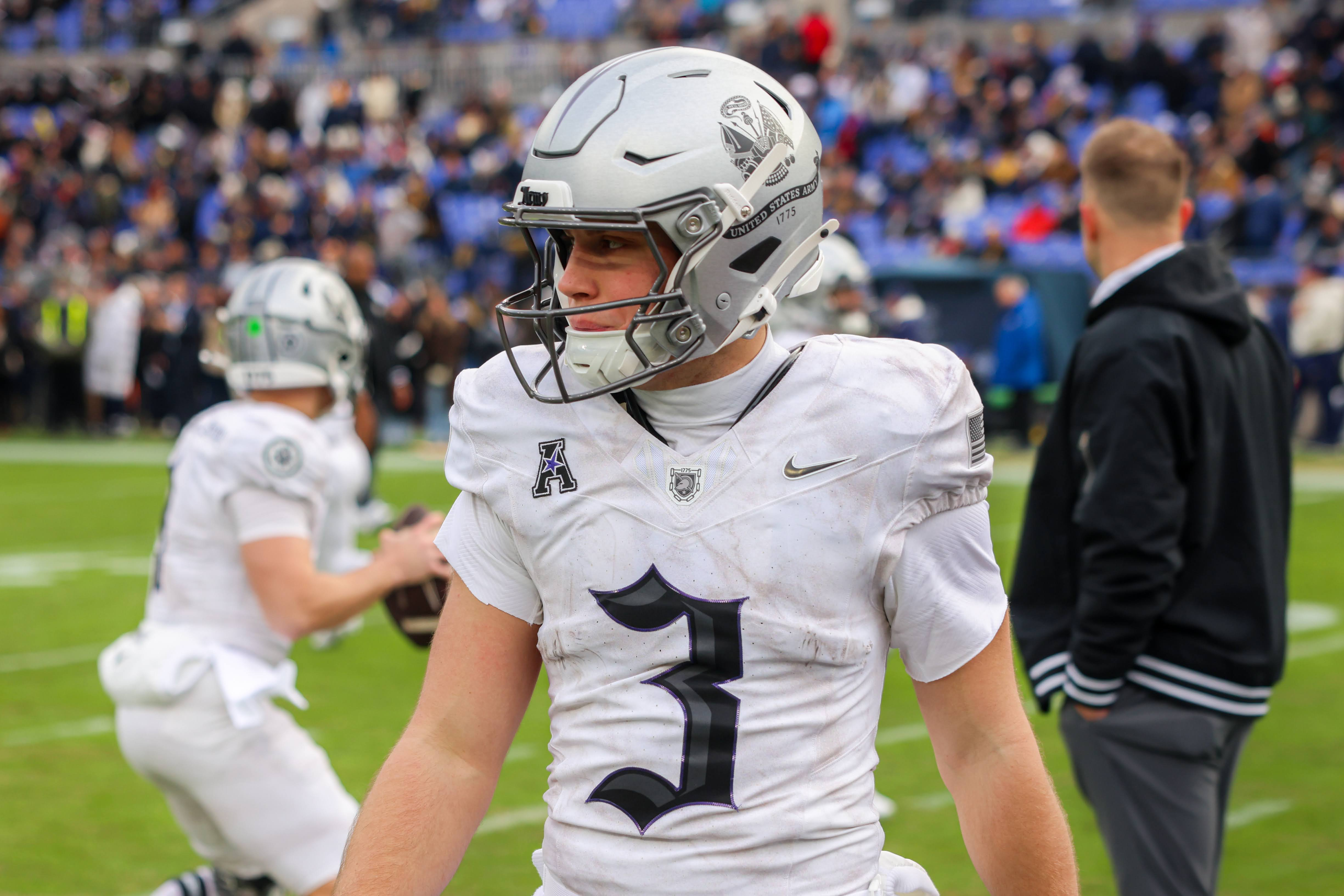
- Hellums during the 2025 Army–Navy Game

No. 3 – Army Black Knights
- Position: Quarterback
- Class: Senior

Personal information
- Listed height: 5 ft 11 in (1.80 m)
- Listed weight: 208 lb (94 kg)

Career information
- High school: Tomball (Tomball, Texas)
- College: Army (2023–present)
- Stats at ESPN

Cale Hellums is an American football quarterback for the Army Black Knights.

== Early life ==
Hellums attended Tomball High School in Tomball, Texas, and committed to play college football for the Army Black Knights.

== College career ==
In his first two seasons in 2023 and 2024, Hellums rushed seven times for 28 yards in three games. He entered the 2025 season as the team's backup quarterback to Dewayne Coleman. Hellums got his first start in week 2 of the 2025 season, in place of the injured Coleman, and completed seven of 11 pass attempts for 43 yards and a touchdown, while also rushing for 124 yards and two touchdowns on 41 carries, in an upset win over Kansas State. After the game he was named the team's starter for the remainder of the season. In week 7, Hellums went two for four passing, for 50 yards, while rushing 21 times for 143 yards and two touchdowns in a victory against Charlotte. In week 10, he completed five of nine pass attempts for 102 yards and a touchdown, while also rushing for 98 yards and a touchdown on 26 carries in a win against rival Air Force. Hellums finished the 2025 season, completing 47 of 87 passes for 694 yards and four touchdowns, while rushing for 1,223 yards and 18 touchdowns on 304 carries.

=== Statistics ===
Year	Team	Games			Passing								Rushing			
Year	Team	GP	GS	Record	Cmp	Att	Pct	Yds	Y/A	TD	Int	Rtg	Att	Yds	Avg	TD
2023	Army	0	0	—	DNP											
2024	Army	3	0	—	0	0	0.0	0	0.0	0	0	0.0	7	28	4.0	0
2025	Army	13	10	6–4	47	87	54.0	694	8.0	4	3	129.3	304	1,223	4.0	18
2026	Army	10	10	5–5	55	102	53.9	565	5.5	4	4	105.2	204	970	4.8	18
Career		26	20	11–9	102	189	54.0	1,259	6.7	8	7	116.5	515	2,221	4.3	36
