= Cam Edwards =

American football player

No. 0 – Michigan State Spartans
- Position: Running back
- Class: Redshirt Senior

Personal information
- Listed height: 5 ft 11 in (1.80 m)
- Listed weight: 206 lb (93 kg)

Career information
- High school: Norwalk (Norwalk, Connecticut)
- College: UConn (2022–2025); Michigan State (2026–present)
- Stats at ESPN

Cam Edwards is an American college football running back for the Michigan State Spartans. He previously played for the UConn Huskies.

== Early life ==
Edwards attended Norwalk High School located in Norwalk, Connecticut. Coming out of high school, he committed to play college football for the UConn Huskies.

== College career ==
During the 2022 season, Edwards rushed just one time for two yards after switching to running back after being recruited as a defensive back. In week eight of the 2023 season, he ran for 149 yards and a touchdown on 22 carries, while also hauling in a touchdown through the air in a loss to South Florida. Edwards finished the 2023 season rushing for 618 yards and four touchdowns. In week three of the 2024 season, Edwards rushed for 106 yards and a touchdown on 21 carries, while also hauling in one pass for 50 yards and a touchdown versus Duke. In week eleven, he rushed for 88 yards on 13 carries, in a win against Georgia State. In the 2024 regular season finale, Edwards ran 18 times for 142 yards and a touchdown in a win over UMass. He finished the 2024 season, rushing for 830 yards and eight touchdowns on 146 carries, while also notching 13 receptions and two touchdowns in 13 games. In week four of the 2025, he rushed for 194 yards and two touchdowns on 24 carries, in a 31-25 win over Ball State.

Edwards transferred to Michigan State for his senior year.
