= 2018 NC State Wolfpack football team =

American college football season

2018 NC State Wolfpack football

Gator Bowl, L 13–52 vs. Texas A&M
- Conference: Atlantic Coast Conference
- Atlantic Division
- Record: 9–4 (5–3 ACC)
- Head coach: Dave Doeren (6th season)
- Offensive coordinator: Eliah Drinkwitz (3rd season)
- Offensive scheme: Multiple
- Co-defensive coordinators: Dave Huxtable (6th season); Ted Roof (1st season)
- Base defense: 4–3
- Home stadium: Carter–Finley Stadium

2018 Atlantic Coast Conference football standings
	Conf.			Overall
Team	W		L	W		L
Atlantic Division
No. 1 Clemson x$#^	8	–	0	15	–	0
No. 15 Syracuse	6	–	2	10	–	3
NC State	5	–	3	9	–	4
Boston College	4	–	4	7	–	5
Wake Forest	3	–	5	7	–	6
Florida State	3	–	5	5	–	7
Louisville	0	–	8	2	–	10
Coastal Division
Pittsburgh x	6	–	2	7	–	7
Georgia Tech	5	–	3	7	–	6
Miami (FL)	4	–	4	7	–	6
Virginia	4	–	4	8	–	5
Virginia Tech	4	–	4	6	–	7
Duke	3	–	5	8	–	5
North Carolina	1	–	7	2	–	9
Championship: Clemson 42, Pittsburgh 10
# – College Football Playoff champion; ^ – College Football Playoff participant; $ – Conference champion; x – Division champion/co-champions; Rankings from AP Poll

The 2018 NC State Wolfpack football team represented North Carolina State University during the 2018 NCAA Division I FBS football season. The Wolfpack played their home games at Carter–Finley Stadium in Raleigh, North Carolina and competed in the Atlantic Division of the Atlantic Coast Conference. They were led by sixth-year head coach Dave Doeren. They finished the season 9–4, 5–3 in ACC play to finish in third place in the Atlantic Division. They received a bid to the Gator Bowl where they were defeated by Texas A&M.

== Coaching staff ==
Name	Title
Dave Doeren	Head Coach
Eliah Drinkwitz	Offensive coordinator/quarterbacks
Dave Huxtable	Co-defensive coordinator/linebackers
Ted Roof	Co-defensive coordinator/safeties/nickles
George Barlow	Assistant head coach/cornerbacks
Eddie Faulkner	Special teams coordinator/tight ends/fullbacks
Aaron Henry	Safeties
Desmond Kitchings	Assistant head coach/running backs/recruiting coordinator
Dwayne Ledford	Run Game coordinator/offensive line
George McDonald	Passing Game coordinator/wide receivers
Kevin Patrick	Defensive line

== Roster ==
2018 NC State Wolfpack football team roster
Quarterbacks: 7 Matthew McKay – freshman (6'4, 210) (redshirt); 10 Micah Leon – freshman (6'5, 214) (redshirt); 12 Jory Perkins – freshman (6'0, 150) (redshirt); 13 Devin Leary – freshman (6'2, 195); 14 Woody Cornwell - graduate (6'2, 210); 15 Ryan Finley – graduate (6'4, 210); Running backs: 5 Damontay Rhem – junior (5'11, 213) (redshirt); 20 Ricky Person Jr. – freshman (6'1, 210); 24 Nakia Robinson Jr. – freshman (5'11, 191) (redshirt); 25 Reggie Gallaspy II – senior (5'11, 235); 26 Trent Pennix – freshman (6'2, 225); 29 Marquise Braxton – junior (6'1, 225) (redshirt); 33 Brady Bodine – graduate (5'10, 195); 38 Will Dabbs – sophomore (5'11, 191) (redshirt); 39 Darius Walton – freshman (5'7, 156); Wide receivers: 1 Stephen Louis – graduate (6'2, 215); 3 Kelvin Harmon – junior (6'3, 214); 11 Jakobi Meyers – junior (6'2, 203) (redshirt); 19 C.J. Riley – sophomore (6'4, 206) (redshirt); 31 Tyler Dabbs – sophomore (5'10, 182) (redshirt); 80 Justin Dunn – freshman (6'1, 204); 82 Max Fisher – freshman (6'2, 193) (redshirt); 83 Erik Collins – sophomore (5'9, 176) (redshirt); 84 Jasiah Provillon – freshman (6'3, 196); 85 Devin Carter – freshman (6'4, 209); 86 Emeka Emezie – sophomore (6'3, 208); 87 Thayer Thomas – freshman (6'1, 193) (redshirt); Tight ends: 6 Cary Angeline – sophomore (6'7, 254) (redshirt); 28 Dylan Parham – sophomore (6'5, 236) (redshirt); 42 Dylan Autenrieth – sophomore (6'4, 242) (redshirt); 47 Damien Darden – freshman (6'3, 255) (redshirt); 88 Adam Boselli – freshman (6'5, 253) (redshirt); 89 Thomas Ruocchio – sophomore (6'3, 245) (redshirt); 93 Camden Woods – freshman (6'3, 233); Punters: 90 A. J. Cole III – senior (6'4, 218); 90 Mackenzie Morgan – freshman (6'2, 215); 99 Trenton Gill – freshman (6'4, 211) (redshirt)	Offensive lineman: 52 Kendall Brown – sophomore (6'4, 263) (redshirt); 53 Tyler Jones – senior (6'3, 306) (redshirt); 55 Tyrone Riley – junior (6'6, 290) (redshirt); 56 Kollin Byers – freshman (6'4, 263) (redshirt); 59 Liam Ryan – freshman (6'2, 290) (redshirt); 61 Bo Ressler – freshman (6'7, 271); 62 Bryson Speas – freshman (6'4, 277) (redshirt); 64 Kahric Belle – freshman (6'6, 360); 65 Garrett Bradbury – graduate (6'3, 300); 66 Joshua Fedd-Jackson – sophomore (6'3, 329); 67 Justin Witt – sophomore (6'6, 310) (redshirt); 68 Charles Fletcher – freshman (6'2, 293) (redshirt); 70 Terronne Prescod – senior (6'5, 334) (redshirt); 71 Joe Sculthorpe – sophomore (6'3, 314) (redshirt); 72 Philip Walton Jr. – junior (6'6, 300) (redshirt); 73 Justin Chase – sophomore (6'5, 300) (redshirt); 74 Emanuel McGirt Jr. – junior (6'6, 300) (redshirt); 75 Jalynn Stricklan – freshman (6'6, 329); 78 Gabriel Gonzalez – freshman (6'5, 277); 79 Ben Kaiser – graduate (6'3, 273); Defensive lineman: 29 Alim McNeill – freshman (6'2, 299); 29 Jessie Malit – freshman (6'3, 270) (redshirt); 39 James Smith-Williams – junior (6'3, 270) (redshirt); 42 Danny Blakeman – freshman (6'2, 269) (redshirt); 44 Joe Babros – junior (6'4, 250); 45 Darian Roseboro – senior (6'4, 283); 52 Ibrahim Kante – freshman (6'4, 250) (redshirt); 55 Deonte Holden – graduate (6'4, 247); 56 Val Martin – sophomore (6'2, 307) (redshirt); 58 Davontae McCrae – freshman (6'5, 257); 73 Grant Gibson – freshman (6'1, 300) (redshirt); 90 Shug Frazier – sophomore (6'3, 318) (redshirt); 91 Eurndraus Bryant – senior (6'1, 330); 92 Larrell Murchison – junior (6'3, 291) (redshirt); 94 Kennan Solomon – sophomore (6'5, 281) (redshirt); 95 Derrick Eason – freshman (6'4, 264); 96 Dante Johnson – freshman (6'3, 283) (redshirt); 97 Xavier Lyas – freshman (6'4, 235) (redshirt); 99 Joseph Boletepeli – freshman (6'4, 285)	Placekickers: 38 Christopher Dunn – freshman (5'8, 177); 92 Kyle Bambard – graduate (5'8, 188); Linebackers: 2 Louis Acceus – sophomore (5'11, 220); 3 Germaine Pratt – graduate (6'3, 240); 11 Payton Wilson – freshman (6'4, 240); 12 Brock Miller – sophomore (6'3, 231) (redshirt); 30 Calvin Hart Jr. – freshman (6'1, 219); 41 Isaiah Moore – freshman (6'2, 233) (redshirt); 43 David Pierson – sophomore (6'1, 227) (redshirt); 47 Alex Gray – freshman (6'2, 215); 48 Bryce Swackhammer – freshman (6'2, 214); 49 Seth Williams – freshman (6'2, 228); 54 Evin Bellamy – junior (6'2, 231) (redshirt); Defensive backs: 4 Nick McCloud – junior (6'4, 186); 7 Freddie Phillips Jr. – junior (6'1, 210) (redshirt); 8 Maurice Trowell – senior (5'11, 195) (redshirt); 10 Tanner Ingle – freshman (5'10, 186); 13 Stephen Morrison – senior (5'11, 217) (redshirt); 14 Dexter Wright – senior (6'2, 229) (redshirt); 15 Chris Ingram – sophomore (6'0, 186); 19 Malik Dunlap – freshman (6'3, 207); 20 Teshaun Smith – freshman (6'3, 187); 21 Stephen Griffin – junior (6'3, 210) (redshirt); 22 Isaiah Stallings – sophomore (6'4, 220) (redshirt); 24 De'Von Graves – freshman (6'1, 192); 25 Taiyon Palmer – freshman (5'11, 183); 26 Isaac Duffy – freshman (5'10, 180); 27 Vernon Grier – junior (5'10, 185) (redshirt); 28 Kishawn Miller – junior (5'9, 175); 31 Jarius Morehead – junior (6'1, 220) (redshirt); 32 Tyler Baker-Williams – freshman (6'1, 200); 33 Dalton Counts – freshman (6'0, 212) (redshirt); 34 Tim Kid-Glass – junior (6'1, 204); 36 William Brown III – junior (5'8, 192) (redshirt); Long snappers: 50 Jackson Quiggle – sophomore (5'11, 224) (redshirt); 57 Tyler Griffiths – senior (6'1, 253); 60 Griffin Hicks – freshman (6'1, 159)

Roster Source:

== Recruiting ==
=== Position key ===
Back	B	Center	C	Cornerback	CB	Defensive back	DB
Defensive end	DE	Defensive lineman	DL	Defensive tackle	DT	End	E
Fullback	FB	Guard	G	Halfback	HB	Kicker	K
Kickoff returner	KR	Offensive tackle	OT	Offensive lineman	OL	Linebacker	LB
Long snapper	LS	Punter	P	Punt returner	PR	Quarterback	QB
Running back	RB	Safety	S	Tight end	TE	Wide receiver	WR

=== Recruits ===
The Wolfpack signed a total of 24 recruits.

College recruiting (2018)
Name	Hometown	School	Height	Weight	Commit date
Christopher Dunn; K	Lexington, NC	North Davidson High School	5 ft 10 in (1.78 m)	160 lb (73 kg)	Jun 24, 2016
Christopher Dunn; K	Recruit ratings: Scout: Rivals: 247Sports: ESPN:				
Ricky Person Jr. RB	Wake Forest, NC	Heritage High School	6 ft 2 in (1.88 m)	202 lb (92 kg)	Jan 18, 2017
Ricky Person Jr. RB	Recruit ratings: Scout: Rivals: 247Sports: ESPN:				
Devin Leary; QB	Erial, NJ	Timber Creek Regional High School	6 ft 2 in (1.88 m)	185 lb (84 kg)	Apr 6, 2017
Devin Leary; QB	Recruit ratings: Scout: Rivals: 247Sports: ESPN:				
De'Von Graves; CB	Appomattox, VA	Appomattox County High School	6 ft 1 in (1.85 m)	180 lb (82 kg)	Apr 9, 2017
De'Von Graves; CB	Recruit ratings: Scout: Rivals: 247Sports: ESPN:				
Devin Carter; WR	Clayton, NC	Clayton High School	6 ft 4 in (1.93 m)	205 lb (93 kg)	May 12, 2017
Devin Carter; WR	Recruit ratings: Scout: Rivals: 247Sports: ESPN:				
Malik Dunlap; S	Charlotte, NC	Harding University High School	6 ft 3 in (1.91 m)	185 lb (84 kg)	May 19, 2017
Malik Dunlap; S	Recruit ratings: Scout: Rivals: 247Sports: ESPN:				
Trent Pennix; RB	Raleigh, NC	Sanderson High School	6 ft 2 in (1.88 m)	200 lb (91 kg)	Jun 9, 2017
Trent Pennix; RB	Recruit ratings: Scout: Rivals: 247Sports: ESPN:				
Teshaun Smith; CB	Fort Lauderdale, FL	Western High School	6 ft 3 in (1.91 m)	170 lb (77 kg)	Jun 23, 2017
Teshaun Smith; CB	Recruit ratings: Scout: Rivals: 247Sports: ESPN:				
Gabriel Gonzalez; OT	Mebane, NC	Eastern Alamance High School	6 ft 4 in (1.93 m)	275 lb (125 kg)	Jun 24, 2017
Gabriel Gonzalez; OT	Recruit ratings: Scout: Rivals: 247Sports: ESPN:				
Jasiah Provillon; WR	Irvington, NJ	Irvington High School	6 ft 1 in (1.85 m)	185 lb (84 kg)	Jun 24, 2017
Jasiah Provillon; WR	Recruit ratings: Scout: Rivals: 247Sports: ESPN:				
Tyler Williams; WR	Raleigh, NC	Southeast Raleigh Magnet High School	6 ft 2 in (1.88 m)	205 lb (93 kg)	Jun 26, 2017
Tyler Williams; WR	Recruit ratings: Scout: Rivals: 247Sports: ESPN:				
Kishawn Miller; CB	Gainesville, GA	Georgia Military College	5 ft 10 in (1.78 m)	170 lb (77 kg)	Jun 29, 2017
Kishawn Miller; CB	Recruit ratings: Scout: Rivals: 247Sports: ESPN:				
Jalynn Strickland; OT	Waycross, GA	Ware County High School	6 ft 6 in (1.98 m)	295 lb (134 kg)	Jul 4, 2017
Jalynn Strickland; OT	Recruit ratings: Scout: Rivals: 247Sports: ESPN:				
Davontae McCrae; DE	Miami, FL	Northwestern High School	6 ft 5 in (1.96 m)	255 lb (116 kg)	Jul 7, 2017
Davontae McCrae; DE	Recruit ratings: Scout: Rivals: 247Sports: ESPN:				
Derrick Eason; DT	Norfolk, VA	Norview High School	6 ft 4 in (1.93 m)	240 lb (110 kg)	Jul 28, 2017
Derrick Eason; DT	Recruit ratings: Scout: Rivals: 247Sports: ESPN:				
Calvin Hart; LB	Plantation, FL	American Heritage School	6 ft 1 in (1.85 m)	205 lb (93 kg)	Oct 1, 2017
Calvin Hart; LB	Recruit ratings: Scout: Rivals: 247Sports: ESPN:				
Joe Babros; DE	Mission Viejo, CA	Saddleback College	6 ft 5 in (1.96 m)	250 lb (110 kg)	Oct 6, 2017
Joe Babros; DE	Recruit ratings: Scout: Rivals: 247Sports: ESPN:				
Alim McNeill; DT	Raleigh, NC	Sanderson High School	6 ft 2 in (1.88 m)	272 lb (123 kg)	Nov 4, 2017
Alim McNeill; DT	Recruit ratings: Scout: Rivals: 247Sports: ESPN:				
Joseph Boletepeli; DE	Wake Forest, NC	Heritage High School	6 ft 4 in (1.93 m)	240 lb (110 kg)	Nov 12, 2017
Joseph Boletepeli; DE	Recruit ratings: Scout: Rivals: 247Sports: ESPN:				
Payton Wilson; LB	Hillsborough, NC	Orange High School	6 ft 4 in (1.93 m)	225 lb (102 kg)	Dec 1, 2017
Payton Wilson; LB	Recruit ratings: Scout: Rivals: 247Sports: ESPN:				
Tanner Ingle; CB	Orlando, FL	Dr. Phillips High School	5 ft 9 in (1.75 m)	180 lb (82 kg)	Dec 12, 2017
Tanner Ingle; CB	Recruit ratings: Scout: Rivals: 247Sports: ESPN:				
Kahric Belle; OT	Miami, FL	North Miami Beach High School	6 ft 6 in (1.98 m)	292 lb (132 kg)	Dec 16, 2017
Kahric Belle; OT	Recruit ratings: Scout: Rivals: 247Sports: ESPN:				
Val Martin; DT	Marietta, GA	Iowa Western Community College	6 ft 2 in (1.88 m)	305 lb (138 kg)	Feb 4, 2018
Val Martin; DT	Recruit ratings: Scout: Rivals: 247Sports: ESPN:				
Taiyon Palmer; CB	Lawrenceville, GA	Archer High School	6 ft 0 in (1.83 m)	178 lb (81 kg)	Feb 7, 2018
Taiyon Palmer; CB	Recruit ratings: Scout: Rivals: 247Sports: ESPN:				
Overall recruit ranking:
Note: In many cases, Scout, Rivals, 247Sports, On3, and ESPN may conflict in their listings of height and weight.; In these cases, the average was taken. ESPN grades are on a 100-point scale.; Sources: "2018 Team Ranking". Rivals.com.

== Preseason ==
=== Award watch lists ===
Listed in the order that they were released

Award	Player	Position	Year
Rimington Trophy	Garrett Bradbury	C	SR
Maxwell Award	Ryan Finley	QB	SR
Davey O'Brien Award	Ryan Finley	QB	SR
Fred Biletnikoff Award	Kelvin Harmon	WR	JR
Butkus Award	Germaine Pratt	LB	JR
Outland Trophy	Garrett Bradbury	C	SR
Ray Guy Award	A. J. Cole III	P	SR
Wuerffel Trophy	A.J. Cole III	P	SR
Walter Camp Award	Ryan Finley	QB	SR
Johnny Unitas Golden Arm Award	Ryan Finley	QB	SR
Manning Award	Ryan Finley	QB	SR

=== ACC media poll ===
The ACC media poll was released on July 24, 2018.

Media poll (Atlantic)
Predicted finish	Team	Votes (1st place)
1	Clemson	1,031 (145)
2	Florida State	789 (1)
3	NC State	712 (2)
4	Boston College	545
5	Louisville	422
6	Wake Forest	413
7	Syracuse	232

== Schedule ==
NC State announced its 2018 football schedule on January 17, 2018. The 2018 schedule would consist of seven home games and five away games in the regular season. The Wolfpack would host ACC foes Boston College, Florida State, Virginia, and Wake Forest and would travel to Clemson, Louisville, North Carolina, and Syracuse.

The Wolfpack would host three of the four non-conference opponents, Georgia State from the Sun Belt Conference, James Madison from Division I FCS and West Virginia from the Big 12, and would travel to Marshall from Conference USA.

Date	Time	Opponent	Rank	Site	TV	Result	Attendance
September 1	12:00 p.m.	No. 2 (FCS) James Madison*		Carter–Finley Stadium; Raleigh, NC	ESPNU	W 24–13	56,073
September 8	12:30 p.m.	Georgia State*		Carter–Finley Stadium; Raleigh, NC	ACCRSN	W 41–7	56,017
September 22	7:00 p.m.	at Marshall*		Joan C. Edwards Stadium; Huntington, WV	CBSSN	W 37–20	32,349
September 29	12:20 p.m.	Virginia		Carter–Finley Stadium; Raleigh, NC	ACCN	W 35–21	57,600
October 6	12:30 p.m.	Boston College	No. 23	Carter–Finley Stadium; Raleigh, NC	ACCRSN	W 28–23	57,241
October 20	3:30 p.m.	at No. 3 Clemson	No. 16	Memorial Stadium; Clemson, SC (Textile Bowl)	ESPN	L 7–41	81,295
October 27	7:00 p.m.	at Syracuse	No. 22	Carrier Dome; Syracuse, NY	ESPN2	L 41–51	40,769
November 3	3:30 p.m.	Florida State^{†}	No. 21	Carter–Finley Stadium; Raleigh, NC	ABC	W 47–28	57,600
November 8	7:30 p.m.	Wake Forest	No. 14	Carter–Finley Stadium; Raleigh, NC (rivalry)	ESPN	L 23–27	56,228
November 17	12:20 p.m.	at Louisville		Cardinal Stadium; Louisville, KY	ACCN	W 52–10	48,625
November 24	12:20 p.m.	at North Carolina		Kenan Memorial Stadium; Chapel Hill, NC (rivalry)	ACCN	W 34–28 ^{OT}	41,510
December 1 (Note: The game between NC State and West Virginia originally scheduled for September 15, 2018 was cancelled due to Hurricane Florence. This game was scheduled on October 2, 2018 to replace the West Virginia game and East Carolina’s game at Virginia Tech, also canceled due to Hurricane Florence.)	12:00 p.m.	East Carolina*		Carter–Finley Stadium; Raleigh, NC (Victory Barrel)	ACCN Extra	W 58–3	57,223
December 31	7:30 p.m.	vs. No. 19 Texas A&M*		TIAA Bank Field; Jacksonville, FL (Gator Bowl)	ESPN	L 13–52	38,206
*Non-conference game; ^{†}Homecoming; Rankings from AP Poll and CFP Rankings after October 30 released prior to game; All times are in Eastern time

Schedule source:

== Game summaries ==
=== James Madison ===
James Madison Dukes at NC State Wolfpack − Game summary

Quarter	1	2	3	4	Total
No. 2 (FCS) Dukes	7	0	3	3	13
Wolfpack	0	17	0	7	24

at Carter–Finley Stadium • Raleigh, NC

- Date: September 1, 2018
- Game time: 12:00 p.m.
- Game weather: Temperature: 87 °F (31 °C) • Wind: NNW 1 mph (1.6 km/h) • Weather: Partly Cloudy
- Game attendance: 56,073
- Referee: Riley Johnson
- TV announcers (ESPNU): Mike Corey, Rene Ingoglia
- Sources:,

Game information

First quarter

- 03:41 JMU TD – Ben DiNucci 5 yard pass to Riley Stapleton, (Ethan Ratke PAT)

Second quarter

- 14:11 NCSU FG – Christopher Dunn 25 yard field goal
- 09:39 NCSU TD – Ryan Finley 16 yard pass to Thayer Thomas, (Christopher Dunn PAT)
- 00:18 NCSU TD – Ryan Finley 14 yard pass to C. J. Riley, (Christopher Dunn PAT)

Third quarter

- 10:19 JMU FG – Ethan Ratke 19 yard field goal

Fourth quarter

- 06:59 JMU FG – Ethan Ratke 19 yard field goal
- 01:15 NCSU TD – Reggie Gallaspy 6 yard run (Christopher Dunn PAT)

Top passers

- JMU – Ben DiNucci: 23–27, 197 yards, 1 TD
- NCSU – Ryan Finley: 29–43, 309 yards, 2 TDs

Top rushers

- JMU – Ben DiNucci: 14 rushes, 95 yards
- NCSU – Reggie Gallaspy: 17 rushes, 70 yards, 1 TD

Top Receiving

- JMU – Riley Stapleton: 9 receptions, 88 yards, 1 TD
- NCSU – Jakobi Meyers: 14 receptions, 161 yards

=== Georgia State ===
Georgia State Panthers at NC State Wolfpack − Game summary

Quarter	1	2	3	4	Total
Panthers	7	0	0	0	7
Wolfpack	10	10	7	14	41

at Carter–Finley Stadium • Raleigh, NC

- Date: September 8, 2018
- Game time: 12:30 p.m.
- Game weather: Mostly Sunny
- Game attendance: 56,017
- Referee: David Epperley
- TV announcers (ACCRSN): Wes Durham, James Bates
- Sources:,

Game information

First quarter

- 12:37 GSU TD – Destin Coates 5 yard run (Matthew Wright PAT)
- 09:32 NCSU TD – Ryan Finley 5 yard pass to Thayer Thomas (Christopher Dunn PAT)
- 03:22 NCSU FG – Christopher Dunn 25 yard field goal

Second quarter

- 10:41 NCSU TD – Reggie Gallaspy 1 yard run (Christopher Dunn PAT)
- 00:00 NCSU FG – Christopher Dunn 28 yard field goal

Third quarter

- 03:43 NCSU TD – Ryan Finley 1 yard pass to Trent Pennix (Christopher Dunn PAT)

Fourth quarter

- 03:12 NCSU TD – Brady Bodine 39 yard run (Christopher Dunn PAT)
- 01:12 NCSU TD – Matthew McKay 1 yard run (Christopher Dunn PAT)

Top passers

- GSU – Dan Ellington: 15–28, 194 yards
- NCSU – Ryan Finley: 31–38, 370 yards, 2 TDs

Top rushers

- GSU – Destin Coates: 6 rushes, 43 yards, 1 TD
- NCSU – Brady Bodine: 5 rushes, 50 yards, 1 TD

Top Receiving

- GSU – Devin Gentry: 5 receptions, 83 yards
- NCSU – Kelvin Harmon: 8 receptions, 129 yards

=== At Marshall ===
NC State Wolfpack at Marshall Thundering Herd − Game summary

Quarter	1	2	3	4	Total
Wolfpack	3	20	14	0	37
Thundering Herd	0	7	13	0	20

at Joan C. Edwards Stadium • Huntington, WV

- Date: September 22, 2018
- Game time: 7:00 p.m.
- Game weather: Cloudy
- Game attendance: 32,349
- Referee: Jason Heaser
- TV announcers (CBSSN): Rich Waltz, Aaron Murray
- Sources:,

Game information

First quarter

- 04:45 NCSU FG – Christopher Dunn 30 yard field goal

Second quarter

- 14:55 NCSU TD – Reggie Gallaspy 1 yard run (Christopher Dunn PAT)
- 14:04 MAR TD – Isaiah Green 82 yard pass to Marcel Williams (Justin Rohrwasser PAT)
- 09:20 NCSU FG – Christopher Dunn 32 yard field goal
- 02:33 NCSU TD – Reggie Gallaspy 1 yard run (Christopher Dunn PAT)
- 00:00 NCSU FG – Christopher Dunn 26 yard field goal

Third quarter

- 09:20 MAR FG – Justin Rohrwasser 32 yard field goal
- 09:11 MAR TD – Artis Johnson 22 yard fumble recovery
- 07:24 NCSU TD – Ryan Finley 30 yard pass to Emeka Emezie (Christopher Dunn PAT)
- 03:05 MAR FG – Justin Rohrwasser 29 yard field goal
- 00:28 NCSU TD – Jarius Morehead 57 yard interception

Fourth quarter

Top passers

- NCSU – Ryan Finley: 23–40, 377 yards, 1 TD
- MAR – Isaiah Green: 22–43, 270 yards, 1 TD

Top rushers

- NCSU – Reggie Gallaspy: 22 rushes, 81 yards, 2 TD
- MAR – Tyler King: 9 rushes, 30 yards

Top Receiving

- NCSU – Kelvin Harmon: 6 receptions, 150 yards
- MAR – Keion Davis: 6 receptions, 99 yards

=== Virginia ===
Virginia Cavaliers at NC State Wolfpack − Game summary

Quarter	1	2	3	4	Total
Cavaliers	7	0	7	7	21
Wolfpack	3	17	7	8	35

at Carter–Finley Stadium • Raleigh, NC

- Date: September 29, 2018
- Game time: 12:20 p.m.
- Game weather: Sunny
- Game attendance: 57,600
- Referee: Gary Patterson
- TV announcers (ACCN): Tom Werme, David Archer, Lericia Harris
- Sources:,

Game information

First quarter

- 12:07 NCSU FG – Christopher Dunn 34 yard field goal
- 02:51 UVA TD – Bryce Perkins 35 yard pass to Olamide Zaccheaus (Hunter Pearson PAT)

Second quarter

- 11:50 NCSU TD – Ryan Finley 16 yard pass to Emeka Emezie (Christopher Dunn PAT)
- 00:52 NCSU TD – Ryan Finley 14 yard pass to Cary Angeline (Christopher Dunn PAT)
- 00:00 NCSU FG – Christopher Dunn 44 yard field goal

Third quarter

- 07:48 NCSU TD – Reggie Gallaspy 2 yard run (Christopher Dunn PAT)
- 03:11 UVA TD – Bryce Perkins 9 yard pass to Olamide Zaccheaus (Hunter Pearson PAT)

Fourth quarter

- 07:25 NCSU TD – Ryan Finley 16 yard pass to Kelvin Harmon (2 point conversion good)
- 03:08 UVA TD – Jordan Ellis 7 yard run (Pearson PAT)

Top passers

- UVA – Bryce Perkins: 20–35, 258 yards, 2 TDs
- NCSU – Ryan Finley: 22–32, 257 yards, 3 TDs

Top rushers

- UVA – Olamide Zaccheaus: 2 rushes, 39 yards
- NCSU – Ricky Person: 14 rushes, 108 yards

Top Receiving

- UVA – Olamide Zaccheaus: 9 receptions, 109 yards, 2 TDs
- NCSU – Kelvin Harmon: 6 receptions, 94 yards, 1 TD

=== Boston College ===
Boston College Eagles at NC State Wolfpack − Game summary

Quarter	1	2	3	4	Total
Eagles	3	0	7	13	23
No. 23 Wolfpack	7	14	7	0	28

at Carter–Finley Stadium • Raleigh, NC

- Date: October 6, 2018
- Game time: 12:30 p.m.
- Game weather: Cloudy
- Game attendance: 57,241
- Referee: Riley Johnson
- TV announcers (ACCRSN): Wes Durham, James Bates
- Sources:,

Game information

First quarter

- 07:52 NCSU TD – Reggie Gallaspy 3 yard run (Christopher Dunn PAT)
- 04:53 BC FG – Colton Lichtenberg 33 yard field goal

Second quarter

- 04:43 NCSU TD – Reggie Gallaspy 1 yard run (Christopher Dunn PAT)
- 00:43 NCSU TD – Ryan Finley 4 yard pass to Jakobi Meyers (Christopher Dunn PAT)

Third quarter

- 02:57 NCSU TD – Ryan Finley 34 yard pass to Kelvin Harmon (Christopher Dunn PAT)
- 01:33 BC TD – Ben Glines 21 yard run (Colton Lichtenberg PAT)

Fourth quarter

- 11:10 BC TD – Anthony Brown 11 yard pass to Ben Glines (2 point conversion failed)
- 03:33 BC TD – Travis Levy 0 yard punt return (Colton Lichtenberg PAT)

Top passers

- BC – Anthony Brown: 14–25, 198 yards, 1 TD
- NCSU – Ryan Finley: 25–34, 308 yards, 2 TDs

Top rushers

- BC – Ben Glines: 16 rushes, 90 yards, 1 TD
- NCSU – Reggie Gallaspy: 25 rushes, 104 yards, 2 TDs

Top Receiving

- BC – Michael Walker: 3 receptions, 72 yards
- NCSU – Kelvin Harmon: 9 receptions, 128 yards, 1 TD

=== At Clemson ===
NC State Wolfpack at Clemson Tigers − Game summary

Quarter	1	2	3	4	Total
No. 16 Wolfpack	0	0	0	7	7
No. 3 Tigers	14	10	7	10	41

at Memorial Stadium • Clemson, SC

- Date: October 20, 2018
- Game time: 3:30 p.m.
- Game weather: Sunny • Temperature: 72 °F (22 °C) • Wind: West 14 mph (23 km/h)
- Game attendance: 81,295
- Referee: Jeff Flanagan
- TV announcers (ESPN): Sean McDonough (play-by-play), Todd Blackledge (color), Holly Rowe (sideline)
- Sources:,

Game information

First quarter

- 11:23 CLEM TD – Travis Etienne 3 yard run (Greg Huegel PAT)
- 02:59 CLEM TD – Trevor Lawrence 46 yard pass to Tee Higgins (Greg Huegel PAT)

Second quarter

- 00:46 CLEM TD – Travis Etienne 2 yard run (Greg Huegel PAT)
- 00:02 CLEM FG – Greg Huegel 28 yard field goal

Third quarter

- 03:54 CLEM TD – Travis Etienne 1 yard run (Greg Huegel PAT)

Fourth quarter

- 14:56 NCSU TD – Reggie Gallaspy 9 yard run (Christopher Dunn PAT)
- 12:32 CLEM FG – Greg Huegel 27 yard field goal
- 08:11 CLEM TD – Lyn-J Dixon 2 yard run (Greg Huegel PAT)

Top passers

- NCSU – Ryan Finley: 21–34, 156 yards
- CLEM – Trevor Lawrence: 26–39, 308 yards, 1 TD

Top rushers

- NCSU – Reggie Gallaspy: 9 rushes, 59 yards, 1 TD
- CLEM – Travis Etienne: 15 rushes, 39 yards, 3 TDs

Top Receiving

- NCSU – C. J. Riley: 3 receptions, 66 yards
- CLEM – Tee Higgins: 8 receptions, 119 yards, 1 TD

=== At Syracuse ===
NC State Wolfpack at Syracuse Orange − Game summary

Quarter	1	2	3	4	Total
No. 22 Wolfpack	7	13	7	14	41
Orange	24	3	14	10	51

at Carrier Dome • Syracuse, NY

- Date: October 27, 2018
- Game time: 7:00 p.m.
- Game attendance: 40,679
- Referee: Jeff Maconaghy
- TV announcers (ESPN2): Beth Mowins, Anthony Becht, Rocky Boiman
- Sources:,

Game information

First quarter

- 10:20 CUSE FG – Andre Szymt 29 yard field goal
- 09:44 NCSU TD – Ryan Finley 75 yard pass to Emeka Emezie (Christopher Dunn PAT)
- 09:08 CUSE TD – Eric Dungey 82 yard pass to Nykeim Johnson (Andre Szymt PAT)
- 06:08 CUSE TD – Jarveon Howard 2 yard run (Andre Szymt PAT)
- 02:39 CUSE TD – Eric Dungey 20 yard pass to Jamal Custis (Andre Szymt PAT)

Second quarter

- 10:45 NCSU FG – Christopher Dunn 25 yard field goal
- 07:40 NCSU TD – Ryan Finley 74 yard pass to Kelvin Harmon (Christopher Dunn PAT)
- 03:13 NCSU FG – Christopher Dunn 29 yard field goal
- 00:00 CUSE FG – Andre Szymt 45 yard field goal

Third quarter

- 09:15 CUSE TD – Eric Dungey 1 yard run (Andre Szymt PAT)
- 06:10 NCSU TD – Brady Bodine 1 yard run (Christopher Dunn PAT)
- 04:11 CUSE TD – Eric Dungey 31 yard pass to Taj Harris (Andre Szymt PAT)

Fourth quarter

- 14:28 NCSU TD – Reggie Gallaspy 1 yard run (Christopher Dunn PAT)
- 09:39 CUSE FG – Andre Szymt 41 yard field goal
- 07:23 NCSU TD – Ryan Finley 12 yard pass to Kelvin Harmon (Christopher Dunn PAT)
- 01:05 CUSE TD – Dontae Strickland 5 yard run (Andre Szymt PAT)

Top passers

- NCSU – Ryan Finley: 26–44, 473 yards, 3 TDs
- CUSE – Eric Dungey: 27–38, 411 yards, 3 TDs

Top rushers

- NCSU – Reggie Gallaspy: 19 rushes, 65 yards, 1 TD
- CUSE – Dontae Strickland: 15 rushes, 32 yards, 1 TD

Top Receiving

- NCSU – Kelvin Harmon: 11 receptions, 247 yards, 2 TDs
- CUSE – Sean Riley: 10 receptions, 164 yards

=== Florida State ===
Florida State Seminoles at NC State Wolfpack − Game summary

Quarter	1	2	3	4	Total
Seminoles	0	14	7	7	28
Wolfpack	10	17	10	10	47

at Carter–Finley Stadium • Raleigh, NC

- Date: November 3, 2018
- Game time: 3:30 p.m.
- Game weather: Sunny
- Game attendance: 57,600
- Referee: Jerry Magallane
- TV announcers (ABC): Adam Amin, Rod Gilmore

Game information

First quarter

- 10:35 NCSU TD – Ricky Person Jr. 1 yard run (Christopher Dunn PAT)
- 00:10 NCSU FG – Christopher Dunn 21 yard field goal

Second quarter

- 11:13 NCSU TD – Ryan Finley 8 yard pass to Kelvin Harmon (Christopher Dunn PAT)
- 09:36 FSU TD – James Blackman 35 yard pass to Tamorrion Terry (Ricky Aguayo PAT)
- 05:01 NCSU FG – Christopher Dunn 26 yard field goal
- 01:14 NCSU TD – Ricky Person Jr. 4 yard run (Christopher Dunn PAT)
- 00:26 FSU TD – James Blackman 8 yard pass to Cam Akers (Ricky Aguayo PAT)

Third quarter

- 08:14 NCSU FG – Christopher Dunn 31 yard field goal
- 04:32 NCSU TD – Ryan Finley 2 yard pass to Jakobi Meyers (Christopher Dunn PAT)
- 02:08 FSU TD – James Blackman 10 yard pass to Tamorrion Terry (Ricky Aguayo PAT)

Fourth quarter

- 11:10 NCSU TD – Ryan Finley 2 yard pass to Ricky Person Jr. (Christopher Dunn PAT)
- 05:30 NCSU FG – Christopher Dunn 38 yard field goal
- 00:40 FSU TD – James Blackman 31 yard pass to D. J. Matthews (Ricky Aguayo PAT)

Top passers

- FSU – James Blackman: 29–48, 421 yards, 4 TDs
- NCSU – Ryan Finley: 21–27, 240 yards, 3 TDs

Top rushers

- FSU – Cam Akers: 10 rushes, 29 yards
- NCSU – Reggie Gallaspy: 21 rushes, 106 yards

Top Receiving

- FSU – Tamorrion Terry: 5 receptions, 142 yards, 2 TDs
- NCSU – Jakobi Meyers: 9 receptions, 125 yards, 1 TD

=== Wake Forest ===
Wake Forest Demon Deacons at NC State Wolfpack − Game summary

Quarter	1	2	3	4	Total
Demon Deacons	0	3	10	14	27
No. 22 Wolfpack	6	7	3	7	23

at Carter–Finley Stadium • Raleigh, NC

- Date: November 8, 2018
- Game time: 7:00 p.m.
- Game weather: Cloudy • Temperature: 58 °F (14 °C) • Wind: NE 7 mph (11 km/h)
- Game attendance: 56,228
- Referee: Jeff Heaser
- TV announcers (ESPN): Dave Flemming, Tim Hasselbeck, Matt Hasselbeck

Game information

First quarter

- 12:42 NCSU FG – Christopher Dunn 29 yard field goal
- 00:52 NCSU FG – Christopher Dunn 23 yard field goal

Second quarter

- 09:47 WFU FG – Nick Sciba 47 yard field goal
- 04:36 NCSU TD – Ryan Finley 2 yard run (Christopher Dunn PAT)

Third quarter

- 11:47 WFU FG – Nick Sciba 34 yard field goal
- 03:40 NCSU FG – Christopher Dunn 23 yard field goal
- 02:05 WFU TD – Jamie Newman 38 yard pass to Alex Bachman (Nick Sciba PAT)

Fourth quarter

- 14:53 NCSU TD – Ryan Finley 35 yard pass to Emeka Emezie (Christopher Dunn PAT)
- 06:07 WFU TD – Jamie Newman 19 yard pass to Greg Dortch (Nick Sciba PAT)
- 00:30 WFU TD – Jamie Newman 32 yard pass to Jack Freudenthal (Nick Sciba PAT)

Top passers

- WFU – Jamie Newman: 22–33, 297 yards, 3 TDs
- NCSU – Ryan Finley: 35–52, 374 yards, 2 Total TDs

Top rushers

- WFU – Cade Carney: 12 rushes, 68 yards
- NCSU – Reggie Gallaspy: 14 rushes, 36 yards

Top Receiving

- WFU – Sage Surratt: 8 receptions, 109 yards
- NCSU – Kelvin Harmon: 15 receptions, 134 yards

=== At Louisville ===
NC State Wolfpack at Louisville Cardinals − Game summary

Quarter	1	2	3	4	Total
Wolfpack	7	10	21	14	52
Cardinals	3	0	0	7	10

at Cardinal Stadium • Louisville, KY

- Date: November 17, 2018
- Game time: 12:20 p.m.
- Game weather: Cloudy
- Game attendance: 48,265
- Referee: John Flanagan
- TV announcers (ACCN): Tom Werme, Dave Archer, Lericia Harris

Game information

First quarter

- 09:26 UL FG – Blanton Creque 32 yard field goal
- 05:50 NCSU TD – Ryan Finley 25 yard pass to Kelvin Harmon (Christopher Dunn PAT)

Second quarter

- 09:31 NCSU FG – Christopher Dunn 23 yard field goal
- 00:56 NCSU TD – Reggie Gallaspy 1 yard run (Christopher Dunn PAT)

Third quarter

- 13:31 NCSU TD – Reggie Gallaspy 18 yard run (Christopher Dunn PAT)
- 09:10 NCSU TD – Ryan Finley 12 yard pass to Emeka Emezie (Christopher Dunn PAT)
- 05:49 NCSU TD – Ryan Finley 6 yard pass to Reggie Gallaspy (Christopher Dunn PAT)

Fourth quarter

- 13:45 NCSU TD – Ryan Finley 3 yard pass to Jakobi Meyers (Christopher Dunn PAT)
- 10:44 UL TD – Malik Cunningham 20 yard run (Blanton Creque PAT)
- 05:00 NCSU TD – Brady Bodine 1 yard run (Christopher Dunn PAT)

Top passers

- NCSU – Ryan Finley: 26–36, 316 yards, 4 TDs
- UL – Malik Cunningham: 8–14, 90 yards

Top rushers

- NCSU – Reggie Gallaspy: 11 rushes, 73 yards, 2 TDs
- UL – Malik Cunningham: 14 rushes, 100 yards, 1 TD

Top Receiving

- NCSU – Kelvin Harmon: 7 receptions, 100 yards, 1 TD
- UL – Jaylen Smith: 3 receptions, 56 yards

=== At North Carolina ===
NC State Wolfpack at North Carolina Tar Heels − Game summary

Quarter	1	2	3	4	OT	Total
Wolfpack	7	14	0	7	6	34
Tar Heels	0	6	15	7	0	28

at Kenan Memorial Stadium • Chapel Hill, NC

- Date: November 24, 2018
- Game time: 12:20 p.m.
- Game weather: Rainy
- Game attendance: 41,510
- Referee: Jeff Heaser
- TV announcers (ACCN): Tom Werme, Dave Archer, Lericia Harris

Game information

First quarter

- 09:09 NCSU TD – Reggie Gallaspy 1 yard run (Christopher Dunn PAT)

Second quarter

- 13:07 UNC FG – Freeman Jones 24 yard field goal
- 3:16 UNC FG – Freeman Jones 43 yard field goal

Third quarter

- 09:21 NCSU TD – Reggie Gallaspy 3 yard run (Christopher Dunn PAT)
- 08:03 UNC TD – Cade Fortin 37 yard pass to Beau Corrales (Freeman Jones PAT)
- 03:58 NCSU TD – Reggie Gallaspy 34 yard run (Christopher Dunn PAT)
- 01:31 UNC TD – Javonte Williams 8 yard run (Tucker PAT)

Fourth quarter

- 09:29 UNC TD – Cade Fortin 1 yard rush (2 point conversion good)
- 06:00 NCSU TD – Reggie Gallaspy 5 yard run (Christopher Dunn PAT)

First Overtime

- NCSU TD – Reggie Gallaspy 1 yard run (Christopher Dunn PAT)

Top passers

- NCSU – Ryan Finley: 16–28, 200 yards
- UNC – Cade Fortin: 19–40, 276 yards, 1 TD

Top rushers

- NCSU – Reggie Gallaspy: 27 rushes, 129 yards, 5 TDs
- UNC – Javonte Williams: 16 rushes, 83 yards, 1 TD

Top Receiving

- NCSU – Jakobi Meyers: 7 receptions, 111 yards
- UNC – Dazz Newsome: 6 receptions, 91 yards

=== East Carolina ===
East Carolina Pirates at NC State Wolfpack − Game summary

Quarter	1	2	3	4	Total
Pirates	0	0	0	3	3
Wolfpack	17	10	14	17	58

at Carter–Finley Stadium • Raleigh, NC

- Date: December 1, 2018
- Game time: 12:00 p.m.
- Game weather: Mostly cloudy
- Game attendance: 57,223
- Referee: C. Lamertine
- TV announcers (ACCN Extra): Kevin Fitzgerald, Stan Lewter

Game information

First quarter

- 10:13 NCSU FG – Christopher Dunn 23 yard field goal
- 04:05 NCSU TD – Ryan Finley 14 yard pass to Kelvin Harmon (Christopher Dunn PAT)
- 00:10 NCSU TD – Reggie Gallaspy 11 yard run (Christopher Dunn PAT)

Second quarter

- 11:26 NCSU TD – Ryan Finley 24 yard pass to Jakobi Meyers (Christopher Dunn PAT)
- 00:02 NCSU FG – Christopher Dunn 28 yard field goal

Third quarter

- 06:49 NCSU TD – Ryan Finley 3 yard pass to Thayer Thomas (Christopher Dunn PAT)
- 04:35 NCSU TD – Reggie Gallaspy 4 yard run (Christopher Dunn PAT)

Fourth quarter

- 12:47 NCSU FG – Christopher Dunn 26 yard field goal
- 11:52 NCSU TD – Garrett Bradbury 1 yard run (Christopher Dunn PAT)
- 08:31 NCSU TD – Woody Cornwell 11 yard run (Christopher Dunn PAT)
- 00:00 ECU FG – Jake Verity 46 yard field goal

Top passers

- ECU – Reid Herring: 8–22, 69 yards
- NCSU – Ryan Finley: 32–44, 409 yards, 3 TDs

Top rushers

- ECU – Anthony Scott: 12 rushes, 50 yards
- NCSU – Reggie Gallaspy: 24 rushes, 220 yards, 2 TDs

Top Receiving

- ECU – Trevon Brown: 3 receptions, 48 yards
- NCSU – Jakobi Meyers: 13 receptions, 163 yards, 1 TD

=== Vs. Texas A&M–Gator Bowl ===
NC State Wolfpack vs Texas A&M − Game summary

Quarter	1	2	3	4	Total
Wolfpack	3	10	0	0	13
No. 21 Aggies	7	14	14	17	52

at TIAA Bank Field • Jacksonville, FL

- Date: December 31, 2018
- Game time: 7:30 p.m.
- Game attendance: 38,206
- Referee: Mark Duddy
- TV announcers (ESPN): Adam Amin, Rod Gilmore, Quint Kessenich

Game information

First quarter

- 14:34 A&M TD – Kellen Mond 62 yard run (Seth Small PAT)
- 02:21 NCSU FG – Christopher Dunn 43 yard field goal

Second quarter

- 14:56 NCSU TD – Ryan Finley 9 yard pass to Riley (Christopher Dunn PAT)
- 10:45 NCSU FG – Christopher Dunn 49 yard field goal
- 06:43 A&M TD – Trayveon Williams 2 yard run (Seth Small PAT)
- 00:32 A&M TD – Kellen Mond 6 yard pass to Kendrick Rogers (Seth Small PAT)

Third quarter

- 11:18 A&M TD – Tyrel Dodson 78 yard interception return (Seth Small PAT)
- 05:44 A&M TD – Trayveon Williams 17 yard run (Seth Small PAT)

Fourth quarter

- 13:56 A&M TD – Trayveon Williams 93 yard run (Seth Small PAT)
- 06:17 A&M FG – Seth Small 35 yard field goal
- 00:22 A&M TD – Cullen Gillaspia 13 yard run (Daniel LaCamera PAT)

Top passers

- NCSU – Ryan Finley: 19–32, 139 yards, 1 TD
- A&M – Kellen Mond: 14–26, 140 yards, 1 TD

Top rushers

- NCSU – Reggie Gallaspy: 14 rushes, 79 yards
- A&M – Trayveon Williams: 19 rushes, 236 yards, 3 TDs

Top Receiving

- NCSU – Emeka Emezie: 6 receptions, 36 yards
- A&M – Kendrick Rogers: 6 receptions, 44 yards, 1 TD

== Awards and honors ==
=== Individual awards ===
- Rimington Award – Garrett Bradbury

=== All-ACC Teams ===
1st Team

Ryan Finley, Quarterback
Kelvin Harmon, Wide receiver
Jakobi Meyers, Wide receiver
Tyler Jones, Offensive Tackle
Garrett Bradbury, Center
Germaine Pratt, Linebacker

2nd Team

Christopher Dunn, Kicker

3rd Team

Reggie Gallaspy Jr., Running back

=== All-Americans ===
==== Consensus ====
First Team

Garrett Bradbury, Center

==== Associated Press ====
First Team

Garrett Bradbury, Center

Third Team

Terrone Prescod, Offensive Tackle

==== Walter Camp ====
First Team

Garrett Bradbury, Center

==== FWAA ====
First Team

Garrett Bradbury, Center

== Rankings ==
Ranking movements Legend: ██ Increase in ranking ██ Decrease in ranking — = Not ranked RV = Received votes
	Week															
Poll	Pre	1	2	3	4	5	6	7	8	9	10	11	12	13	14	Final
AP	RV	RV	RV	RV	RV	23	20	16	22	RV	22	RV	RV	RV	RV	RV
Coaches	RV	RV	RV	RV	RV	25	19	15	22	RV	22	RV	RV	RV	RV	RV
CFP	Not released									21	14	—	—	—	—	Not released

== 2019 NFL draft ==
Player	Team	Round	Pick #	Position
Garrett Bradbury	Minnesota Vikings	1st	18th	C
Germaine Pratt	Cincinnati Bengals	3rd	72nd	LB
Ryan Finley	Cincinnati Bengals	4th	104th	QB
Kelvin Harmon	Washington Redskins	6th	206th	WR
