= 2018 Texas A&M Aggies football team =

American college football season

2018 Texas A&M Aggies football

Gator Bowl champion

Gator Bowl, W 52–13 vs. NC State
- Conference: Southeastern Conference
- Western Division

Ranking
- Coaches: No. 16
- AP: No. 16
- Record: 9–4 (5–3 SEC)
- Head coach: Jimbo Fisher (1st season)
- Offensive coordinator: Darrell Dickey (1st season)
- Offensive scheme: Pro-style
- Defensive coordinator: Mike Elko (1st season)
- Base defense: 4–2–5
- Home stadium: Kyle Field

Uniform
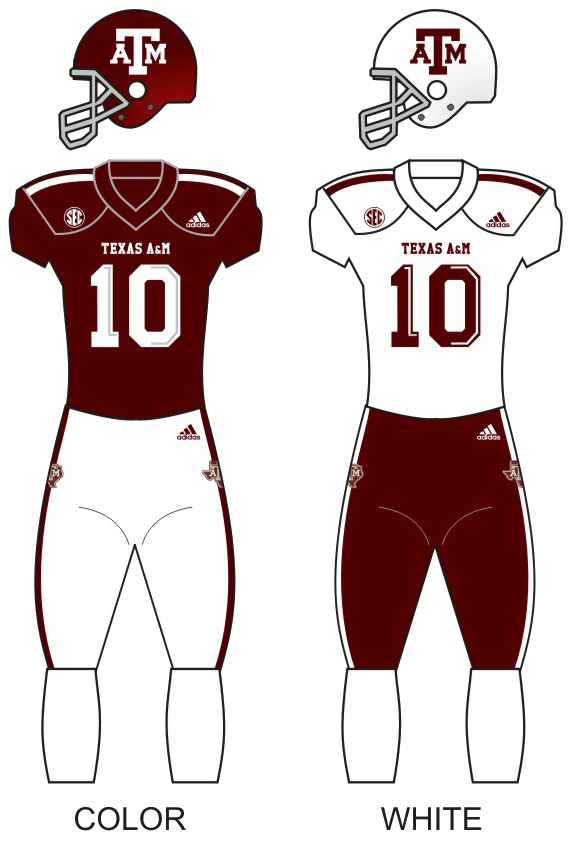

2018 Southeastern Conference football standings
	Conf.			Overall
Team	W		L	W		L
Eastern Division
No. T–7 Georgia x	7	–	1	11	–	3
No. 12 Kentucky	5	–	3	10	–	3
No. T–7 Florida	5	–	3	10	–	3
South Carolina	4	–	4	7	–	6
Missouri	4	–	4	8	–	5
Vanderbilt	3	–	5	6	–	7
Tennessee	2	–	6	5	–	7
Western Division
No. 2 Alabama x$^	8	–	0	14	–	1
No. 16 Texas A&M	5	–	3	9	–	4
No. 6 LSU	5	–	3	10	–	3
Mississippi State*	4	–	4	8	–	5
Auburn	3	–	5	8	–	5
Ole Miss	1	–	7	5	–	7
Arkansas	0	–	8	2	–	10
Championship: Alabama 35, Georgia 28
^ – College Football Playoff participant; $ – Conference champion; x – Division champion/co-champions; * Mississippi State vacated four conference and eight total wins due to NCAA violations.; Rankings from AP Poll

The 2018 Texas A&M Aggies football team represented Texas A&M University in the 2018 NCAA Division I FBS football season. The Aggies played their home games at Kyle Field in College Station, Texas and competed in the Western Division of the Southeastern Conference (SEC). They were led by first-year head coach Jimbo Fisher.

== Recruiting ==
=== Recruits ===
The Aggies signed a total of 23 recruits.

College recruiting (2018)
Name	Hometown	School	Height	Weight	Commit date
Luke Matthews; OG	Missouri City, Texas	Elkins High School	6 ft 4 in (1.93 m)	305 lb (138 kg)	Feb 23, 2016
Luke Matthews; OG	Recruit ratings: Scout: Rivals: 247Sports: ESPN:				
Montel Parker; WR	Dickinson, Texas	Dickinson High School	6 ft 2 in (1.88 m)	185 lb (84 kg)	Feb 28, 2016
Montel Parker; WR	Recruit ratings: Scout: Rivals: 247Sports: ESPN:				
Colten Blanton; OT	Cypress, Texas	Cypress Ranch High School	6 ft 7 in (2.01 m)	285 lb (129 kg)	Dec 12, 2016
Colten Blanton; OT	Recruit ratings: Scout: Rivals: 247Sports: ESPN:				
Jordan Moore; DB	Yoakum, Texas	Yoakum High School	5 ft 11 in (1.80 m)	192 lb (87 kg)	Dec 24, 2016
Jordan Moore; DB	Recruit ratings: Scout: Rivals: 247Sports: ESPN:				
Seth Small; K	Katy, Texas	Katy High School	5 ft 11 in (1.80 m)	190 lb (86 kg)	Apr 29, 2017
Seth Small; K	Recruit ratings: Scout: Rivals: 247Sports: ESPN:				
Max Wright; DE	Katy, Texas	Taylor High School	6 ft 4 in (1.93 m)	270 lb (120 kg)	Jun 2, 2017
Max Wright; DE	Recruit ratings: Scout: Rivals: 247Sports: ESPN:				
Deneric Prince; RB	Manvel, Texas	Manvel High School	6 ft 1 in (1.85 m)	196 lb (89 kg)	Jun 9, 2017
Deneric Prince; RB	Recruit ratings: Scout: Rivals: 247Sports: ESPN:				
Brian Johnson; LB	Manvel, Texas	Manvel High School	6 ft 2 in (1.88 m)	185 lb (84 kg)	Jun 16, 2017
Brian Johnson; LB	Recruit ratings: Scout: Rivals: 247Sports: ESPN:				
Barton Clement; OG	Fort Bend, Texas	Marshall High School	6 ft 3 in (1.91 m)	315 lb (143 kg)	Jun 18, 2017
Barton Clement; OG	Recruit ratings: Scout: Rivals: 247Sports: ESPN:				
Tyree Wilson; DE	New London, Texas	West Rusk High School	6 ft 5 in (1.96 m)	235 lb (107 kg)	Jun 19, 2017
Tyree Wilson; DE	Recruit ratings: Scout: Rivals: 247Sports: ESPN:				
Caleb Chapman; WR	Friendswood, Texas	Clear Brook High School	6 ft 5 in (1.96 m)	210 lb (95 kg)	Jul 29, 2017
Caleb Chapman; WR	Recruit ratings: Scout: Rivals: 247Sports: ESPN:				
Jalen Preston; WR	Manvel, Texas	Manvel High School	6 ft 2 in (1.88 m)	212 lb (96 kg)	Jul 29, 2017
Jalen Preston; WR	Recruit ratings: Scout: Rivals: 247Sports: ESPN:				
Jace Sternberger; TE	Kingfisher, Oklahoma	Northeastern Oklahoma A&M College	6 ft 4 in (1.93 m)	240 lb (110 kg)	Dec 10, 2017
Jace Sternberger; TE	Recruit ratings: Scout: Rivals: 247Sports: ESPN:				
Mohamed Diallo; DT	Toronto, Ontario	Arizona Western College	6 ft 4 in (1.93 m)	320 lb (150 kg)	Dec 23, 2017
Mohamed Diallo; DT	Recruit ratings: Scout: Rivals: 247Sports: ESPN:				
Leon O'Neal Jr. S	Cypress, Texas	Cypress Springs High School	6 ft 1 in (1.85 m)	190 lb (86 kg)	Feb 5, 2018
Leon O'Neal Jr. S	Recruit ratings: Scout: Rivals: 247Sports: ESPN:				
Bobby Brown III; DT	Arlington, Texas	Lamar High School	6 ft 4 in (1.93 m)	282 lb (128 kg)	Feb 7, 2018
Bobby Brown III; DT	Recruit ratings: Scout: Rivals: 247Sports: ESPN:				
Tank Jenkins; OG	Montgomery, Alabama	Park Crossing High School	6 ft 3 in (1.91 m)	325 lb (147 kg)	Feb 7, 2018
Tank Jenkins; OG	Recruit ratings: Scout: Rivals: 247Sports: ESPN:				
Jeremiah Martin; DE	San Bernardino, California	Cajon High School	6 ft 5 in (1.96 m)	240 lb (110 kg)	Feb 7, 2018
Jeremiah Martin; DE	Recruit ratings: Scout: Rivals: 247Sports: ESPN:				
James Foster; QB	Montgomery, Alabama	Lanier High School	6 ft 3 in (1.91 m)	210 lb (95 kg)	Feb 7, 2018
James Foster; QB	Recruit ratings: Scout: Rivals: 247Sports: ESPN:				
Glenn Beal; TE	River Ridge, Louisiana	John Curtis Christian High School	6 ft 5 in (1.96 m)	265 lb (120 kg)	Feb 7, 2018
Glenn Beal; TE	Recruit ratings: Scout: Rivals: 247Sports: ESPN:				
Jashaun Corbin; RB	Rockledge, Florida	Rockledge High School	6 ft 0 in (1.83 m)	191 lb (87 kg)	Feb 7, 2018
Jashaun Corbin; RB	Recruit ratings: Scout: Rivals: 247Sports: ESPN:				
Charles Strong; RB	Lake Butler, Florida	Union County High School	6 ft 1 in (1.85 m)	220 lb (100 kg)	Feb 7, 2018
Charles Strong; RB	Recruit ratings: Scout: Rivals: 247Sports: ESPN:				
Vernon Jackson; RB	Boling, Texas	Boling High School	6 ft 3 in (1.91 m)	240 lb (110 kg)	Feb 7, 2018
Vernon Jackson; RB	Recruit ratings: Scout: Rivals: 247Sports: ESPN:				
Overall recruit ranking:
Note: In many cases, Scout, Rivals, 247Sports, On3, and ESPN may conflict in their listings of height and weight.; In these cases, the average was taken. ESPN grades are on a 100-point scale.; Sources:

== Preseason ==
=== Award watch lists ===
Listed in the order that they were released

Award	Player	Position	Year
Rimington Trophy	Erik McCoy	C	JR
Chuck Bednarik Award	Kingsley Keke	DT	SR
Chuck Bednarik Award	Tyrel Dodson	LB	JR
Maxwell Award	Trayveon Williams	RB	JR
Doak Walker Award	Trayveon Williams	RB	JR
John Mackey Award	Jace Sternberger	TE	JR
Butkus Award	Otaro Alaka	LB	SR
Bronko Nagurski Trophy	Tyrel Dodson	LB	JR
Bronko Nagurski Trophy	Landis Durham	DE	SR
Lou Groza Award	Daniel LaCamera	K	SR
Wuerffel Trophy	Riley Garner	LB	SR
Ted Hendricks Award	Landis Durham	DE	SR
Earl Campbell Tyler Rose Award	Trayveon Williams	RB	JR

=== SEC media poll ===
The SEC media poll was released on July 20, 2018, with the Aggies predicted to finish in fourth place in the West Division.

=== Preseason All-SEC teams ===
The Aggies had five players selected to the preseason all-SEC teams.

Offense

2nd team

Trayveon Williams – RB

3rd team

Erik McCoy – C

Defense

3rd team

Kingsley Keke – DL

Landis Durham – DL

Specialists

2nd team

Daniel LaCamera – K

== Schedule ==
Date	Time	Opponent	Rank	Site	TV	Result	Attendance
August 30	7:30 p.m.	Northwestern State*		Kyle Field; College Station, TX (SEC Nation)	SECN	W 59–7	95,855
September 8	6:00 p.m.	No. 2 Clemson*		Kyle Field; College Station, TX (College GameDay)	ESPN	L 26–28	104,794
September 15	6:30 p.m.	Louisiana–Monroe*		Kyle Field; College Station, TX	SECN	W 48–10	96,727
September 22	2:30 p.m.	at No. 1 Alabama	No. 22	Bryant–Denny Stadium; Tuscaloosa, AL (SEC Nation)	CBS	L 23–45	101,821
September 29	11:00 a.m.	vs. Arkansas		AT&T Stadium; Arlington, TX (Southwest Classic)	ESPN	W 24–17	55,383
October 6	6:00 p.m.	No. 13 Kentucky		Kyle Field; College Station, TX	ESPN	W 20–14 ^{OT}	99,829
October 13	2:30 p.m.	at South Carolina	No. 22	Williams–Brice Stadium; Columbia, SC	SECN	W 26–23	76,871
October 27	6:00 p.m.	at Mississippi State	No. 16	Davis Wade Stadium; Starkville, MS	ESPN	L 13–28	57,085
November 3	11:00 a.m.	at Auburn	No. 20	Jordan–Hare Stadium; Auburn, AL	ESPN	L 24–28	85,945
November 10	11:00 a.m.	Ole Miss		Kyle Field; College Station, TX	CBS	W 38–24	102,618
November 17	6:00 p.m.	UAB*		Kyle Field; College Station, TX	ESPN2	W 41–20	97,584
November 24	6:30 p.m.	No. 7 LSU	No. 22	Kyle Field; College Station, TX (rivalry)	SECN	W 74–72 ^{7OT}	101,501
December 31	6:30 p.m.	vs. NC State*	No. 19	TIAA Bank Field; Jacksonville, FL (Gator Bowl)	ESPN	W 52–13	38,206
*Non-conference game; Rankings from AP Poll and CFP Rankings after October 30 released prior to game; All times are in Central time

Schedule source:

== Personnel ==
=== Roster ===
2018 Texas A&M Aggies football team roster
Players
Coaches
Offense

Pos.	#	Name	Class
WB	1	Quartney Davis	So
WR	2	Jhamon Ausbon	So
RB	3	Vernon Jackson	Fr
QB	4	James Foster	Fr
RB	5	Trayveon Williams	Jr
WR	6	Roshauud Paul	So
RB	7	Jashaun Corbin	Fr
QB	8	Connor Blumrick	Fr
WR	9	Hezekiah Jones	So
WR	10	Jalen Preston	Fr
QB	11	Kellen Mond	So
FB	12	Cullen Gillaspia	Sr
WR	13	Kendrick Rogers	So
WR	14	Camron Buckley	So
WR	15	Aaron Hansford	So
WR	16	Klyde Chriss	So
QB	17	Nick Starkel	So
QB	18	Bo Schneider	Jr
QB	19	Colton Taylor	So
WR	20	Reese Mason	Fr
RB	21	Deneric Prince	Fr
RB	22	Kwame Etwi	Sr
RB	23	Jacob Kibodi	So
QB	24	Jagger LaRoe	Fr
RB	25	Cordarrian Richardson	So
RB	26	Charles Strong Jr.	Fr
RB	27	John Clark	So
RB	28	AJ Sanders	So
WR	29	Kurtis Bradicich	Fr
WR	30	Andrew Boykin	Fr
WR	30	Cade Williams	Fr
RB	31	Marquez Johnson	So
TE	31	Gannon Rawlins	So
WR	32	Hunter Smith	So
FB	35	Javonte Kemp	Fr
WR	42	Ke'undre Azakytu	So
TE	46	Ryan Renick	So
TE	47	Jacob Groff	Fr
FB	49	Ben Miles	Fr
OL	51	Riley Anderson	So
OL	54	Carson Green	So
OL	59	Miles Fowkes	Fr
OL	60	Barton Clement	Fr
OL	63	Cagan Baldree	So
OL	64	Erik McCoy	Jr
OL	65	Dan Moore	So
OL	67	Galen Gallagher	Fr
OL	68	Justin Dworaczyk	Jr
OL	70	Connor Lanfear	Sr
OL	71	Grayson Reed	Fr
OL	72	Colten Blanton	Fr
OL	73	Jared Hocker	So
OL	74	Kellen Diesch	So
OL	75	Luke Matthews	Fr
OL	76	Colton Prater	Jr
OL	77	Ryan McCollum	So
OL	78	Keaton Sutherland	Sr
OL	79	Marcus Jenkins	Fr
TE	80	Trevor Wood	Sr
TE	81	Jace Sternberger	Jr
WR	82	Caleb Chapman	Fr
WR	83	Montel Parker	Fr
TE	86	Glenn Beal	Fr
TE	87	Greer Shetler	Jr
WR	88	Keynel McZeal	Fr
FB	89	Justin Mellenbruch	Fr

Defense

Pos.	#	Name	Class
LB	1	Buddy Johnson	So
DL	2	Micheal Clemons	Jr
DL	3	Tyree Johnson	Fr
DB	4	Derrick Tucker	So
DL	5	Bobby Brown III	Fr
DB	6	Donovan Wilson	Sr
DL	7	Mohamed Diallo	Jr
DL	8	Kingsley Keke	Sr
DB	9	Leon O'Neal Jr.	Fr
DB	10	Myles Jones	So
DB	11	Larry Pryor	Jr
DB	13	Cade Prendergast	Fr
DB	14	Keldrick Carper	So
DL	15	Jeremiah Martin	Fr
LB	16	Brian Johnson	Fr
DB	17	Devin Morris	Fr
DB	18	Antonio Howard	Jr
LB	19	Anthony Hines, III	So
DB	20	Ikenna Okeke	So
DB	21	Charles Oliver	Jr
DB	22	Clifford Chattman	So
DB	23	Jordan Moore	Fr
DB	24	Alex Zettler	Fr
LB	25	Tyrel Dodson	Jr
DB	26	Deshawn Capers-Smith	Sr
DB	27	Roney Elam	Jr
DB	28	Travon Fuller	So
DB	29	Debione Renfro	So
DL	33	Ondario Robinson	Fr
DL	34	Daylon Mack	Sr
LB	35	Riley Garner	Sr
DL	37	Mitchell Howard	Jr
DL	40	Tyree Wilson	Fr
LB	42	Otaro Alaka	Sr
DL	46	Landis Durham	Sr
DL	52	Justin Madubuike	So
LB	53	John Locke	So
LB	55	Kiante McCoy	Fr
LB	56	Keeath Magee, II	So
LB	57	Drew Boroughs	Jr
LB	58	Braden White	So
DB	84	Moses Reynolds	So
DL	85	Camron Horry	Fr
DL	90	TD Moton
DL	91	Mark Mabry	So
DL	92	Jayden Peevy	So
DL	93	Max Wright	Fr
DL	94	Landry Estes	Sr
DL	99	Josh Rogers	Fr

Special teams

Pos.	#	Name	Class
P	34	Braden Mann	Jr
PK	36	Daniel LaCamera	Sr
PK	38	Drew Riethman	So
DS	39	Jake Pagel	Fr
DS	40	Connor Choate	So
DS	45	Austin Frey	Sr
PK	47	Seth Small	Fr
DS	48	Colton Bergt	Fr

Head coach

- Jimbo Fisher (1st season)

Coordinators/assistant coaches

- Tim Brewster – Tight ends
- Dameyune Craig – Wide receivers
- Darrell Dickey – Offensive coordinator/quarterbacks
- Mike Elko – Defensive coordinator/safeties
- Jay Graham – Running backs
- Maurice Linguist – Cornerbacks
- Bradley Dale Peveto – Linebackers
- Terry Price – Defensive ends
- Elijah Robinson – Defensive line
- Jim Turner – Offensive line
- Jerry Schmidt – Director of Athletic Performance
- Christian Parker – Defensive analyst
- Tyler Santucci – Defensive analyst
- Stan Watson – Defensive analyst
- David Spurlock – Offensive analyst
- Walt Whitehead – Offensive analyst

Legend

- (C) Team captain
- (S) Suspended
- (I) Ineligible
- Injured
- Redshirt

Roster
Last update: September 3, 2018

=== Coaching staff ===
Name	Position	Season at Texas A&M
Jimbo Fisher	Head coach	1st
Darrell Dickey	Offensive coordinator and Quarterbacks coach	1st
Tim Brewster	Tight ends coach	1st
Dameyune Craig	Wide receivers coach	1st
Jay Graham	Running backs coach	1st
Jim Turner	Offensive line coach	7th
Mike Elko	Defensive coordinator and safeties coach	1st
Maurice Linguist	Cornerbacks coach	1st
Terry Price	Defensive ends coach	7th
Elijah Robinson	Interior defensive line coach	1st
Bradley Dale Peveto	Special teams coordinator and linebackers coach	1st
Jerry Schmidt	Director of athletic performance	1st

== Game summaries ==
=== Northwestern State ===
Week One: Northwestern State Demons at Texas A&M Aggies – Game summary

Quarter	1	2	3	4	Total
Demons	0	0	0	7	7
Aggies	7	28	17	7	59

at Kyle Field, College Station, TX

- Date: August 30
- Game time: 7:36 p.m. CDT
- Game weather: Temperature: 93 °F (34 °C) • Weather: partly cloudy • Wind: E/SE 6 MPH
- Game attendance: 95,855
- Referee: Ken Williamson
- TV announcers (SECN): Tom Hart (play-by-play), Jordan Rodgers (analyst), Cole Cubelic (sidelines)

Game information

First quarter

- TAMU – Trayveon Williams 73-yard run (Daniel LaCamera kick), 11:41. Aggies 7–0. Drive: 3 plays, 93 yards, 1:24.

Second quarter

- TAMU – Jace Sternberger 7-yard pass from Kellen Mond (Daniel LaCamera kick), 14:56. Aggies 14–0. Drive: 7 plays, 59 yards, 2:37.
- TAMU – Trayveon Williams 2-yard run (Daniel LaCamera kick), 8:11. Aggies 21–0. Drive: 9 plays, 76 yards, 3:58.
- TAMU – Kellen Mond 1-yard run (Daniel LaCamera kick), 4:16. Aggies 28–0. Drive: 8 plays, 55 yards, 2:34.
- TAMU – Jace Sternberger 8-yard pass from Kellen Mond (Daniel LaCamera kick), 0:06. Aggies 35–0. Drive: 12 plays, 87 yards, 2:21.

Third quarter

- TAMU – Treyveon Williams 40-yard run (Daniel LaCamera kick), 12:20. Aggies 42–0. Drive: 6 plays, 65 yards, 2:40.
- TAMU – Kwame Etwi 4-yard run (Daniel LaCamera kick), 9:23. Aggies 49–0. Drive: 6 plays, 61 yards, 2:06.
- TAMU – Daniel LaCamera 52-yard field goal, 3:24. Aggies 52–0. Drive: 11 plays, 57 yards, 4:45.

Fourth quarter

- NWST – Jazz Ferguson 71-yard pass from Clay Holgorsen (Austyn Fendrick kick), 14:39. Aggies 52–7. Drive: 1 play, 71 yards, 0:14.
- TAMU – Jalen Preston 14-yard pass from Nick Starkel (Daniel LaCamera kick), 8:00. Aggies 59–7.

Leading Passers

- NWST – Clayton Holgorsen – 9/19, 125 yards, TD
- TAMU – Kellen Mond – 17/25, 184 yards, 2 TD

Leading Rushers

- NWST – Clayton Holgorsen – 2 carries, 7 yards
- TAMU – Trayveon Williams – 20 carries, 240 yards, 3 TD

Leading Receivers

- NWST – Jazz Ferguson – 4 receptions, 129 yards, TD
- TAMU – Jhamon Ausbon – 6 receptions, 81 yards

Middle linebacker Otaro Alaka was ejected in the 1st quarter due to targeting. Safety Donovan Wilson was ejected in the 2nd quarter, also for targeting.

=== Clemson ===
Week Two: No. 2 Clemson Tigers at Texas A&M Aggies – Game summary

Quarter	1	2	3	4	Total
No. 2 Tigers	7	7	14	0	28
Aggies	3	0	10	13	26

at Kyle Field, College Station, TX

- Date: September 8
- Game time: 6:00 p.m. CDT
- Game weather: Temperature: 81 °F (27 °C) • Weather: rain in the area • Wind: W 6 MPH
- Game attendance: 104,794
- Referee: Stuart Mullins
- TV announcers (ESPN): Rece Davis (play-by-play), Kirk Herbstreit (analyst), Maria Taylor (sidelines)

Game information

First quarter

- TAMU – Daniel LaCamera 40-yard field goal, 4:28. Aggies 3–0. Drive: 8 plays, 32 yards, 3:29.
- CLEM – Kelly Bryant 1-yard run (Greg Huegel kick), 1:23. Tigers 7–3. Drive: 7 plays, 75 yards, 3:05.

Second quarter

- CLEM – Tee Higgins 64-yard pass from Trevor Lawrence (Greg Huegel kick), 14:13. Tigers 14–3. Drive: 1 play, 64 yards, 0:14.

Third quarter

- TAMU – Daniel LaCamera 40-yard field goal, 10:37. Tigers 14–6. Drive: 5 plays, 34 yards, 2:28.
- CLEM – Diondre Overton 8-yard pass from Kelly Bryant (Greg Huegel kick), 4:59. Tigers 21–6. Drive: 4 plays, 70 yards, 1:29.
- TAMU – Kendrick Rogers 9-yard pass from Kellen Mond (Daniel LaCamera kick), 4:22. Tigers 21–13. Drive: 2 plays, 78 yards, 0:37.
- CLEM – Travis Etienne 1-yard run (Greg Huegel kick), 1:01. Tigers 28–13. Drive: 8 plays, 75 yards, 3:21.

Fourth quarter

- TAMU – Quartney Davis 14-yard pass from Kellen Mond (Daniel LaCamera kick), 14:07. Tigers 28–20. Drive: 5 plays, 75 yards, 1:54.
- TAMU – Kendrick Rogers 24-yard pass from Kellen Mond (two-point conversion failed), 0:46. Tigers 28–26. Drive: 2 plays, 49 yards, 0:26.

Leading Passers

- CLEM – Kelly Bryant – 12/17, 205 yards, TD
- TAMU – Kellen Mond – 23/40, 430 yards, 3 TD

Leading Rushers

- CLEM – Kelly Bryant – 15 carries, 54 yards, TD
- TAMU – Kellen Mond – 10 carries, 33 yards

Leading Receivers

- CLEM – Tee Higgins – 3 receptions, 123 yards, TD
- TAMU – Kendrick Rogers – 7 receptions, 120 yards, 2 TD

=== Louisiana–Monroe ===
Week Three: Louisiana–Monroe Warhawks at Texas A&M Aggies – Game summary

Quarter	1	2	3	4	Total
Warhawks	3	7	0	0	10
Aggies	7	17	10	14	48

at Kyle Field, College Station, TX

- Date: September 15
- Game time: 6:30 p.m. CDT
- Game weather: Temperature: 86 °F (30 °C) • Weather: partly cloudy • Wind: SSW – 10 mph
- Game attendance: 96,727
- Referee: Matt Austin
- TV announcers (SECN): Tom Hart (play-by-play), Jordan Rodgers (analyst), Cole Cubelic (sidelines)

Game information

First quarter

- TAMU - Trayveon Williams 2-yard TD run, Seth Small kick good, 8:56 (TAMU 7-0)
- ULM - Craig Ford 27-yard field goal, 1:08 (TAMU 7-3)

Second quarter

- TAMU - Kellen Mond 7-yard TD run, Small kick good, 10:17 (TAMU 14-3)
- TAMU - Small 40-yard field goal, 5:33 (TAMU 17-3)
- TAMU - Tyrel Dodson 78-yard blocked field goal returned for TD, Small kick good, 1:21 (TAMU 24-3)
- ULM - R. J. Turner 2-yard TD pass from Caleb Evans, Ford kick good, 0:04 (TAMU 24-10)

Third quarter

- TAMU - Mond 9-yard TD run, Ford kick good, 6:05 (TAMM 31-10)
- TAMU - Small 36-yard field goal, 0:11 (TAMU 34-10)

Fourth quarter

- TAMU - Jace Sternberger 20-yard TD pass from Mond, Small kick good, 8:05 (TAMU 41-10)
- TAMU - Jashuan Corbin 2-yard TD run, Small kick good, 0:39 (TAMU 48-10)

Leading Passers

- TAMU - Kellen Mond - 16/24, 210 yards, TD
- ULM - Caleb Evans - 15/28, 225 yards, TD, INT

Leading Rushers

- TAMU - Trayveon Williams - 22 carries, 128 yards, TD
- ULM - Austin Vaughn - 8 carries, 33 yards

Leading Receivers

- TAMU - Jhamon Ausbon - 4 receptions, 59 yards
- ULM - Marcus Green - 4 receptions, 75 yards

=== At No. 1 Alabama ===
Week Four: No. 22 Texas A&M Aggies at No. 1 Alabama Crimson Tide – Game summary

Quarter	1	2	3	4	Total
No. 22 Aggies	7	6	3	7	23
No. 1 Crimson Tide	14	17	14	0	45

at Bryant–Denny Stadium, Tuscaloosa, AL

- Date: September 22
- Game time: 2:30 p.m CDT
- Game weather: Temperature: 86 °F (30 °C) • Weather: Partly Sunny • Wind: SE @ 8 mph
- Game attendance: 101,821
- Referee: Matt Loeffler
- TV announcers (CBS): Brad Nessler (play-by-play), Gary Danielson (analyst), Jamie Erdahl (sidelines)

Game information

First quarter

- ALA – DeVonta Smith 30-yard pass from Tua Tagovailoa (Joseph Bulovas kick), 14:10. Crimson Tide 7–0. Drive: 1 play, 30 yards, 0:08.
- TAMU – Jace Sternberger 15-yard pass from Kellen Mond (Seth Small kick), 4:55. Tied 7–7. Drive: 8 plays, 99 yards, 4:15.
- ALA – Tua Tagovailoa 1-yard run (Joseph Bulovas kick), 0:45. Crimson Tide 14–7. Drive: 9 plays, 75 yards, 4:10.

Second quarter

- TAMU – Seth Small 52-yard field goal, 8:56. Crimson Tide 14–10. Drive: 4 plays, 37 yards, 2:05.
- ALA – Hale Hentges 23-yard pass from Tua Tagovailoa (Joseph Bulovas kick), 6:50. Crimson Tide 21–10. Drive: 6 plays, 75 yards, 2:00.
- TAMU – Seth Small 32-yard field goal, 3:24. Crimson Tide 21–13. Drive: 8 plays, 60 yards, 3:26.
- ALA – Hale Hentges 6-yard pass from Tua Tagovailoa (Joseph Bulovas kick), 1:09. Crimson Tide 28–13. Drive: 6 plays, 75 yards, 2:15.
- ALA – Joseph Bulovas 47-yard field goal, 0:00. Crimson Tide 31–13. Drive: 3 plays, 17 yards, 0:19.

Third quarter

- ALA – Josh Jacobs 3-yard run (Joseph Bulovas kick), 10:03. Crimson Tide 38–13. Drive: 7 plays, 80 yards, 1:29.
- TAMU – Seth Small 25-yard field goal, 5:33. Crimson Tide 38–16. Drive: 10 plays, 67 yards, 4:30.
- ALA – Henry Ruggs III 57-yard pass from Tua Tagovailoa (Joseph Bulovas kick), 2:01. Crimson Tide 45–16. Drive: 2 plays, 92 yards, 0:29.

Fourth quarter

- TAMU – Kellen Mond 9-yard run (Seth Small kick), 7:36. Crimson Tide 45–23. Drive: 11 plays, 88 yards, 5:26.

Leading Passers

- TAMU – Kellen Mond – 16/33, 196 yards, TD, 2 INT
- ALA – Tua Tagovailoa – 22/30, 387 yards, 4 TD

Leading Rushers

- TAMU – Kellen Mond – 18 carries, 98 yards, TD
- ALA – Damien Harris – 7 carries, 52 yards

Leading Receivers

- TAMU – Jace Sternberger – 3 receptions, 59 yards, TD
- ALA – Henry Ruggs – 3 receptions, 89 yards, TD

=== Vs. Arkansas ===
Week Five: Arkansas Razorbacks vs Texas A&M Aggies – Game summary

Quarter	1	2	3	4	Total
Razorbacks	0	7	3	7	17
Aggies	14	3	0	7	24

at AT&T Stadium, Arlington, TX

- Date: September 29
- Game time: 11:00 a.m CDT
- Game weather: Played indoors (retractable roof closed)
- Game attendance: 55,383
- Referee: James Carter
- TV announcers (ESPN): Bob Wischusen (play-by-play), Brock Huard (analyst), Allison Williams (sidelines)

Game information

First quarter

- TAMU – Jashuan Corbin 100-yard kick return (Seth Small kick), 14:46. Aggies 7–0.
- TAMU – Trayveon Williams 1-yard run (Seth Small kick), 8:36. Aggies 14–0. Drive: 8 plays, 79 yards, 4:50.

Second quarter

- TAMU – Seth Small 30-yard field goal, 12:36. Aggies 17–0. Drive: 7 plays, 48 yards, 2:36.
- ARK – Cole Kelley 1-yard run (Connor Limpert kick), 9:35. Aggies 17–7. Drive: 7 plays, 75 yards, 3:01.

Third quarter

- ARK – Connor Limpert 47-yard field goal, 11:16. Aggies 17–10. Drive: 9 plays, 46 yards, 3:44.

Fourth quarter

- TAMU – Trayveon Williams 4-yard run (Seth Small kick), 5:03. Aggies 24–10. Drive: 7 plays, 61 yards, 3:31.
- ARK – Michael Woods II 29-yard pass from Ty Storey (Connor Limpert kick), 3:16. Aggies 24–17. Drive: 6 plays, 75 yards, 1:47.

Leading Passers

- ARK – Ty Storey – 14/26, 193 yards, TD, INT
- TAMU – Kellen Mond – 17/26, 201 yards, 2 INT

Leading Rushers

- ARK – Rakeem Boyd – 10 carries, 47 yards
- TAMU – Trayveon Williams – 29 carries, 152 yards, 2 TD

Leading Receivers

- ARK – Cheyenne O'Grady – 3 receptions, 77 yards
- TAMU – Camron Buckley – 5 receptions, 72 yards

=== Kentucky ===
Week Six: No. 13 Kentucky Wildcats at Texas A&M Aggies – Game summary

Quarter	1	2	3	4	OT	Total
No. 13 Wildcats	7	0	0	7	0	14
Aggies	0	7	0	7	6	20

at Kyle Field, College Station, TX

- Date: October 6
- Game time: 6:00 p.m. CDT
- Game attendance: 99,829
- Referee: Marc Curles
- TV announcers (ESPN): Sean McDonough (play-by-play), Todd Blackledge (analyst), Holly Rowe (sidelines)

Game information

First quarter

- UK – Lynn Bowden Jr. 54-yard pass from Terry Wilson (Miles Butler kick), 1:10. Wildcats 7–0. Drive: 5 plays, 68 yards, 2:22.

Second quarter

- TAMU – Quartney Davis 3-yard pass from Kellen Mond (Seth Small kick), 1:14. Tied 7–7. Drive: 12 plays, 70 yards, 4:43.

Third quarter

- No scoring plays

Fourth quarter

- TAMU – Jace Sternberger 46-yard pass from Kellen Mond (Seth Small kick), 10:13. Aggies 14–7. Drive: 2 plays, 48 yards, 0:54.
- UK – Kent West 40-yard fumble return (Mile Butler kick), 4:17. Tied 14–14.

Overtime

- TAMU – Trayveon Williams 10-yard run. TAMU 20–14. Drive: 4 plays, 25 yards.

Leading Passers

- UK – Terry Wilson – 13/20, 108 yards, TD
- TAMU – Kellen Mond – 18/29, 226 yards, 2 TD, INT

Leading Rushers

- UK – Benny Snell – 13 carries, 60 yards
- TAMU – Trayveon Williams – 24 carries, 138 yards, TD

Leading Receivers

- UK – Lynn Bowden – 3 receptions, 55 yards, TD
- TAMU – Jace Sternberger – 5 receptions, 95 yards, TD

=== At South Carolina ===
Week Seven: No. 22 Texas A&M Aggies at South Carolina Gamecocks – Game summary

Quarter	1	2	3	4	Total
No. 22 Aggies	3	10	3	10	26
Gamecocks	0	0	16	7	23

at Williams–Brice Stadium, Columbia, SC

- Date: October 13
- Game time: 2:30 p.m. CDT
- Game weather: Temperature: 76 °F (24 °C) • Weather: Sunny • Wind: NNE 3 mph (4.8 km/h)
- Game attendance: 76,871
- Referee: Hubert Owens
- TV announcers (SECN): Taylor Zarzour (play-by-play), Matt Stinchcomb (color)

Game information

First quarter

- TAMU – Seth Small 52-yard field goal, 0:31. Aggies 3–0. Drive: 10 plays, 45 yards, 4:38.

Second quarter

- TAMU – Jace Sternberger 4-yard pass from Kellen Mond (Seth Small kick), 4:19. Aggies 10–0. Drive: 5 plays, 94 yards, 3:12.
- TAMU – Seth Small 20-yard field goal, 0:00. Aggies 13–0. Drive: 9 plays, 73 yards, 3:21.

Third quarter

- TAMU – Seth Small 32-yard field goal, 8:36. Aggies 16–0. Drive: 11 plays, 60 yards, 6:24.
- SC – Shi Smith 22-yard pass from Jake Bentley (Bentley pass to Edwards), 4:54. Aggies 16–8. Drive: 10 plays, 82 yards, 3:35.
- SC – Chavis Dawkins 33-yard pass from Jake Bentley (Bentley pass to Edwards), 0:24. Tied 16–16. Drive: 7 plays, 88 yards, 2:43.

Fourth quarter

- TAMU – Seth Small 39-yard field goal, 9:16. Aggies 19–16. Drive: 11 plays, 55 yards, 6:02.
- TAMU – Trayveon Williams 3-yard run (Seth Small kick), 1:36. Aggies 26–16. Drive: 11 plays, 78 yards, 5:45.
- SC – Deebo Samuel 6-yard pass from Jake Bentley (Parker White kick), 0:48. Aggies 26–23. Drive: 5 plays, 75 yards, 0:48.

Leading Passers

- TAMU – Kellen Mond – 25/37, 353 yards, TD
- SC – Jake Bentley – 17/35, 223 yards, 3 TD, INT

Leading Rushers

- TAMU – Trayveon Williams – 19 carries, 78 yards, TD
- SC – Ty'Son Williams – 7 carries, 48 yards

Leading Receivers

- TAMU – Jace Sternberger – 7 receptions, 145 yards, TD
- SC – Deebo Samuel – 7 receptions, 88 yards, TD

=== At Mississippi State ===
Week Nine: Texas A&M Aggies at Mississippi State – Game summary

Quarter	1	2	3	4	Total
No. 16 Aggies	0	10	3	0	13
Bulldogs	7	0	7	14	28

at Davis Wade Stadium, Starkville, MS

- Date: October 27
- Game time: 6:00 p.m. CDT
- Game attendance: 57,085
- TV: ESPN

Game information

First quarter
Second quarter
Third quarter
Fourth quarter

Leading Passers

- TAMU – Kellen Mond – 23/46, 232, TD, INT
- MSU – Nick Fitzgerald – 14/22, 241 yards, 2 TD

Leading Rushers

- TAMU – Jashaun Corbin – 3 carries, 33 yards
- MSU – Nick Fitzgerald – 16 carries, 88 yards, 2 TD

Leading Receivers

- TAMU – Quartney Davis – 6 receptions, 59 yards, TD
- MSU – Stephen Guidry – 3 receptions, 130 yards, TD

=== At Auburn ===
Week Ten: Texas A&M Aggies at Auburn Tigers – Game summary

Quarter	1	2	3	4	Total
No. 25 Aggies	3	14	7	0	24
Tigers	7	7	0	14	28

at Jordan–Hare Stadium, Auburn, AL

- Date: November 3
- Game time: 11:00 a.m. CDT
- Game weather: Temperature: 53 °F (12 °C) • Weather: Sunny • Wind: SE 3 miles per hour (4.8 km/h)
- Game attendance: 85,945
- Referee: Ken Williamson
- TV announcers (ESPN): Bob Wischusen (play-by-play), Brock Huard (analyst), Allison Williams (sideline reporter)

Game information

First quarter

- TA&M – Seth Small 35 yd field goal, 7:10 (TA&M 3–0)
- AUB – Sal Canella 20 yd pass from Ryan Davis (Anders Carlson kick), 1:37 (AUB 7–3)

Second quarter

- TA&M – Trayveon Williams 38 yd run (Seth Small kick), 14:19 (TA&M 14–10)
- AUB – Seth Williams 11 yd pass from Jarrett Stidham (Anders Carlson kick), 4:03 (AUB 14–10)

Third quarter

- TA&M – Trayveon Williams 1 yd run (Seth Small kick), 10:27 (TA&M 24–14)

Fourth quarter

- AUB – Chandler Cox 1 yd run (Anders Carlson kick), 5:14 (TA&M 24–21)
- AUB – Seth Williams 11 yd pass from Jarrett Stidham (Anders Carlson kick), 1:41 (AUB 28–24)

Leading Passers

- TAMU – Kellen Mond – 16–32, 220 yds, 1 TD, 1 INT
- AUB – Jarrett Stidham – 18–29, 239 yds, 2 TD

Leading Rushers

- TAMU – Trayveon Williams – 17 rushes, 107 yds, 2 TD
- AUB – JaTarvious Whitlow – 8 rushes, 16 yds

Leading Receivers

- TAMU – Trayveon Williams – 5 receptions, 71 yds, 1 TD
- AUB – Darius Slayton – 8 receptions, 107 yds

=== Ole Miss ===
Week Eleven: Ole Miss Rebels at Texas A&M Aggies – Game summary

Quarter	1	2	3	4	Total
Rebels	0	14	7	3	24
Aggies	7	7	7	17	38

at Kyle Field, College Station, TX

- Date: November 10
- Game time: 11:00 a.m. CDT
- Game weather: Temperature: 49 °F (9 °C) • Weather: Cloudy
- Game attendance: 102,618
- Referee: Matt Austin
- TV announcers (CBS): Carter Blackburn, Aaron Taylor, Rick Neuheisel

Game information

First quarter

- TAMU – Kellen Mond 1-yard run (Seth Small kick), 1:49. Aggies 7–0. Drive: 14 plays, 71 yards, 7:00.

Second quarter

- MISS – DaMarkus Lodge 44-yard pass from Jordan Ta'amu (Luke Logan kick), 14:51. Tied 7–7. Drive: 5 plays, 75 yards, 1:58.
- MISS – Jordan Ta'amu 1-yard run (Luke Logan kick), 9:48. Rebels 14–7. Drive: 7 plays, 75 yards, 3:02.
- TAMU – Cameron Buckley 21-yard pass from Kellen Mond (Seth Small kick), 0:44. Tied 14–14. Drive: 8 plays, 85 yards, 2:48.

Third quarter

- MISS – Zedrick Woods 96-yard fumble return (Luke Logan kick), 11:34. Rebels 21–14.
- TAMU – Quartnay Davis 10-yard pass from Kellen Mond (Seth Small kick), 4:04. Tied 21–21. Drive: 9 plays, 72 yards, 4:09.

Fourth quarter

- TAMU – Seth Small 46-yard field goal, 14:11. Aggies 24–21. Drive: 7 plays, 18 yards, 2:36.
- TAMU – Quartnay Davis 5-yard pass from Kellen Mond (Seth Small kick), 4:36. Aggies 31–21. Drive: 6 plays, 80 yards, 2:42.
- MISS – Luke Logan 24-yard field goal, 1:51. Aggies 31–24. Drive: 9 plays, 68 yards, 2:45.
- TAMU – Trayveon Williams 46-yard run (Seth Small kick), 1:39. Aggies 38–24. Drive: 1 play, 46 yards, 0:12.

Leading Passers

- MISS – Jordan Ta'amu – 22/35, 373 yards, TD
- TAMU – Kellen Mond – 19/28, 236 yards, 3 TD, INT

Leading Rushers

- MISS – Isaiah Woullard – 16 carries, 64 yards
- TAMU – Trayveon Williams – 31 carries, 228 yards, TD

Leading Receivers

- MISS – A. J. Brown – 6 receptions, 127 yards
- TAMU – Jace Sternberger – 4 receptions, 76 yards

=== UAB ===
Week Twelve: UAB Blazers at Texas A&M Aggies – Game summary

Quarter	1	2	3	4	Total
Blazers	7	0	0	13	20
Aggies	14	10	10	7	41

at Kyle Field, College Station, TX

- Date: November 17
- Game time: 6:00 p.m. CDT
- Game weather: Temperature: 67 °F (19 °C) • Weather: Nice evening • Wind: SE @ 7
- Game attendance: 97,584
- Referee: John McDaid
- TV: ESPN2

Game information

First quarter

- TAMU – Larry Pryor 17-yard fumble recovery (Seth Small kick), 14:51. Aggies 7–0.
- UAB – Andre Wilson 9-yard pass from Tyler Johnston III (Nick Vogel kick), 11:15. Tied 7–7. Drive: 10 plays, 75 yards, 3:36.
- TAMU – Trayveon Williams 9-yard run (Seth Small kick), 5:44. Aggies 14–7. Drive: 6 plays, 66 yards, 2:09.

Second quarter

- TAMU – Seth Small 34-yard field goal, 14:39. Aggies 17–7. Drive: 6 plays, 56 yards, 1:50.
- TAMU – Trayveon Williams 1-yard run (Seth Small kick), 0:40. Aggies 24–7. Drive: 6 plays, 49 yards, 1:10.

Third quarter

- TAMU – Seth Small 25-yard field goal, 10:21. Aggies 27–7. Drive: 9 plays, 68 yards, 4:39.
- TAMU – Jace Sternberger 25-yard pass from Kellen Mond (Seth Small kick), 2:23. Aggies 34–7. Drive: 7 plays, 70 yards, 3:25.

Fourth quarter

- UAB – Andre Wilson 10-yard pass from Tyler Johnston III (Nick Vogel kick blocked), 11:23. Aggies 34–13. Drive: 4 plays, 11 yards, 2:15.
- TAMU – Jace Sternberger 20-yard pass from Kellen Mond (Seth Small kick), 9:21. Aggies 41–13. Drive: 4 plays, 56 yards, 2:02.
- UAB – Spencer Brown 10-yard run (Nick Vogel kick), 4:44. Aggies 41–20. Drive: 10 plays, 90 yards, 4:37.

Leading Passers

- UAB – Tyler Johnston III – 25/39, 306 yards, 2 TD, 2 INT
- TAMU – Kellen Mond – 11/20, 192 yards, 2 TD

Leading Rushers

- UAB – Spencer Brown – 18 carries, 80 yards, TD
- TAMU – Trayveon Williams – 20 carries, 167 yards, 2 TD

Leading Receivers

- UAB – Andre Wilson – 7 receptions, 89 yards, 2 TD
- TAMU – Jace Sternberger – 4 receptions, 85 yards, 2 TD

=== LSU ===
Week Thirteen: LSU Tigers at Texas A&M Aggies – Game summary

Quarter	1	2	3	4	OT	2OT	3OT	4OT	5OT	6OT	7OT	Total
No. 8 Tigers	7	3	7	14	3	7	8	3	6	8	6	72
Aggies	7	10	7	7	3	7	8	3	6	8	8	74

at Kyle Field, College Station, TX

- Date: November 24
- Game time: 6:30 p.m. CDT
- Game weather: Temperature: 65 °F (18 °C) • Weather: clear skies • Wind: S 6 MPH
- Game attendance: 101,501
- Referee: Matt Austin
- TV: SECN

Game information

First quarter

- TAMU – Trayveon Williams 10-yard run (Seth Small kick), 6:31. Aggies 7–0. Drive: 10 plays, 95 yards, 4:28.
- LSU – Joe Burrow 22-yard run (Cole Tracy kick), 0:48. Tied 7–7. Drive: 12 plays, 75 yards, 5:43.

Second quarter

- TAMU – Jace Sternberger 10-yard pass from Kellen Mond (Seth Small kick), 10:31. Aggies 14–7. Drive: 12 plays, 75 yards, 5:17.
- TAMU – Seth Small 33-yard field goal, 1:52. Aggies 17–7. Drive: 8 plays, 53 yards, 3:38.
- LSU – Cole Tracy 47-yard field goal, 0:00. Aggies 17–10. Drive: 12 plays, 36 yards, 1:52.

Third quarter

- LSU – Justin Jefferson 7-yard pass from Joe Burrow (Cole Tracy kick), 7:42. Tied 17–17. Drive: 15 plays, 90 yards, 6:15.
- TAMU – Trayveon Williams 1-yard run (Seth Small kick), 3:33. Aggies 24–17. Drive: 8 plays, 29 yards, 3:43.

Fourth quarter

- LSU – Michael Divinity Jr. 58-yard fumble return (Cole Tracy kick), 10:12. Tied 24–24.
- LSU – Foster Moreau 14-yard pass from Joe Burrow (Cole Tracy kick), 6:41. Tigers 31–24. Drive: 4 plays, 76 yards, 2:00.
- TAMU – Quartney Davis 19-yard pass from Kellen Mond (Seth Small kick), 0:00. Tied 31–31. Drive: 12 plays, 78 yards, 1:23.

Overtime

- LSU – Cole Tracy 50-yard field goal. Tigers 34–31. Drive: 4 plays, -7 yards.
- TAMU – Seth Small 23-yard field goal. Tied 34–34. Drive: 9 plays, 19 yards.

Second overtime

- TAMU – Kellen Mond 3-yard run (Seth Small kick). Aggies 41–34. Drive: 4 plays, 25 yards.
- LSU – Nick Brossette 3-yard run (Cole Tracy kick) Tied 41–41. Drive: 6 plays, 25 yards.

Third overtime

- LSU – Dee Anderson 25-yard pass from Joe Burrow (Burrow pass to Jefferson). Tigers 49–41. Drive: 1 play, 25 yards.
- TAMU – Kendrick Rogers 25-yard pass from Kellen Mond (Mond pass to Rogers). Tied 49–49. Drive: 2 plays, 25 yards.

Fourth overtime

- TAMU – Seth Small 21-yard field goal. Aggies 52–49. Drive: 6 plays, 21 yards.
- LSU – Cole Tracy 26-yard field goal. Tied 52–52. Drive: 6 plays, 17 yards.

Fifth overtime

- LSU – Tory Carter 11-yard pass from Joe Burrow (pass failed). Tigers 58–52. Drive: 3 plays, 25 yards.
- TAMU – Kendrick Rogers 6-yard pass from Kellen Mond (pass failed). Tied 58–58. Drive: 5 plays, 25 yards.

Sixth overtime

- TAMU – Jace Sternberger 25-yard pass from Kellen Mond (Mond pass to Rogers). Aggies 66–58. Drive: 1 play, 25 yards.
- LSU – Joe Burrow 4-yard run (Burrow pass to Anderson). Tied 66–66. Drive: 4 plays, 25 yards.

Seventh overtime

- LSU – Joe Burrow 10-yard run (pass failed). Tigers 72–66. Drive: 1 play, 25 yards.
- TAMU – Quartney Davis 17-yard pass from Kellen Mond (Mond pass to Rogers). Aggies 74–72. Drive: 4 plays, 25 yards.

Leading Passers

- LSU – Joe Burrow – 25/38, 270 yards, 3 TD
- TAMU – Kellen Mond – 23/49, 287 yards, 6 TD

Leading Rushers

- LSU – Joe Burrow – 29 carries, 100 yards, 3 TD
- TAMU – Trayveon Williams – 35 carries, 198 yards, 2 TD

Leading Receivers

- LSU – Justin Jefferson – 5 receptions, 63 yards, TD
- TAMU – Quartney Davis – 7 receptions, 101 yards, 2 TD

With a final score of 74–72 or 146 combined points, the game became the highest-scoring game in NCAA FBS history. The game was also the fifth seven-overtime game in NCAA FBS history.

=== Vs. NC State (Gator Bowl) ===
Gator Bowl: NC State Wolfpack vs. Texas A&M Aggies – Game summary

Quarter	1	2	3	4	Total
Wolpack	3	10	0	0	13
No. 21 Aggies	7	14	14	17	52

at TIAA Bank Field, Jacksonville, FL

- Date: December 31, 2018
- Game time: 6:30 p.m. CDT
- Game attendance: 38,206
- Referee: Mark Duddy
- TV announcers (ESPN): Adam Amin, Rod Gilmore, Quint Kessenich

Game information

First quarter

- (14:34) TAMU TD – Kellen Mond 62 yard run (Seth Small PAT)
- (02:21) NCST FG – Christopher Dunn 43 yard field goal

Second quarter

- (14:56) NCST TD – Ryan Finley 9 yard pass to Riley (Christopher Dunn PAT)
- (10:45) NCST FG – Christopher Dunn 49 yard field goal
- (06:43) TAMU TD – Trayveon Williams 2 yard run (Seth Small PAT)
- (00:32) TAMU TD – Kellen Mond 6 yard pass to Kendrick Rogers (Seth Small PAT)

Third quarter

- (11:18) TAMU TD – Tyrel Dodson 78 yard interception return (Seth Small PAT)
- (05:44) TAMU TD – Trayveon Williams 17 yard run (Seth Small PAT)

Fourth quarter

- (13:56) TAMU TD – Trayveon Williams 93 yard run (Seth Small PAT)
- (06:17) TAMU FG – Seth Small 35 yard field goal
- (00:22) TAMU TD – Cullen Gillaspia 13 yard run (Daniel LaCamera PAT)

Leading Passers

- NCST – Ryan Finley: 19/32, 139 yards, TD
- TAMU – Kellen Mond: 14/26, 140 yards, TD

Leading Rushers

- NCST – Reggie Gallaspy: 14 rushes, 79 yards
- TAMU – Trayveon Williams: 19 rushes, 236 yards, 3 TD

Leading Receivers

- NCST – Emeka Emezie: 6 receptions, 36 yards
- TAMU – Kendrick Rogers: 6 receptions, 44 yards, TD

== Rankings ==
Ranking movements Legend: ██ Increase in ranking ██ Decrease in ranking — = Not ranked RV = Received votes
	Week															
Poll	Pre	1	2	3	4	5	6	7	8	9	10	11	12	13	14	Final
AP	RV	RV	RV	22	RV	RV	22	17	16	25	RV	RV	RV	22	21	16
Coaches	RV	RV	RV	22	RV	RV	22	18	17	RV	RV	RV	RV	22	20	16
CFP	Not released									20	—	—	22	19	19	Not released

== Players drafted into the NFL ==
Round	Pick	Player	Position	NFL club
2	48	Erik McCoy	C	New Orleans Saints
3	75	Jace Sternberger	TE	Green Bay Packers
5	150	Kingsley Keke	DT	Green Bay Packers
5	160	Daylon Mack	DT	Baltimore Ravens
5	182	Trayveon Williams	RB	Cincinnati Bengals
6	213	Donovan Wilson	S	Dallas Cowboys
7	220	Cullen Gillaspia	RB	Houston Texans
