= 2018 Gator Bowl =

College football bowl game

2018 TaxSlayer Gator Bowl
- 74th Gator Bowl
NC State Wolfpack	Texas A&M Aggies
(9–3)	(8–4)
ACC	SEC
13	52
Head coach: Dave Doeren	Head coach: Jimbo Fisher
	AP / Coaches / CFP; 21 / 20 / 19
	1	2	3	4	Total
NC State	3	10	0	0	13
Texas A&M	7	14	14	17	52
- Date: December 31, 2018
- Season: 2018
- Stadium: TIAA Bank Field
- Location: Jacksonville, Florida
- MVP: Trayveon Williams (RB, Texas A&M) & Ryan Finley (QB, NC State)
- Favorite: Texas A&M by 5
- Referee: Mark Duddy (Pac-12)
- Halftime show: Fightin Texas Aggie Band NC State Marching Band
- Attendance: 38,206
- Payout: US$3,168,000

United States TV coverage
- Network: ESPN
- Announcers: Adam Amin, Rod Gilmore and Quint Kessenich

The 2018 Gator Bowl was a college football bowl game played on December 31, 2018. It was the 74th edition of the Gator Bowl, and one of the 2018–19 bowl games concluding the 2018 FBS football season. Sponsored by the financial technology company TaxSlayer, the game was officially known as the TaxSlayer Gator Bowl, after four seasons without "Gator" in the bowl name.

== Teams ==
The game featured the NC State Wolfpack from the Atlantic Coast Conference (ACC) and the Texas A&M Aggies from the Southeastern Conference (SEC); the teams had never played each other. This was Texas A&M's second Gator Bowl and NC State's fourth.

=== NC State Wolfpack ===
NC State received and accepted a bid to the Gator Bowl on December 2. The Wolfpack entered the bowl with a 9–3 record (5–3 in conference).

=== Texas A&M Aggies ===
Texas A&M received and accepted a bid to the Gator Bowl on December 2. The Aggies entered the bowl with an 8–4 record (5–3 in conference).

== Game summary ==
After holding a 21–13 lead at halftime, Texas A&M outscored NC State 31–0 in the second half, for a 52–13 final. Aggie running back Trayveon Williams set a new Gator Bowl rushing record with 236 yards, breaking the prior record of 216 that had been set in the 1966 edition by Floyd Little. The game's attendance of 38,206 was the smallest since the 1950s.

=== Scoring summary ===
Scoring summary

Quarter	Time	Drive			Team	Scoring information	Score	
Quarter	Time	Plays	Yards	TOP	Team	Scoring information	NCSU	A&M
1	14:41	2	71	0:26	A&M	Kellen Mond 62-yard touchdown run, Seth Small kick good	0	7
1	2:21	12	71	5:53	NCSU	43-yard field goal by Christopher Dunn	3	7
2	14:56	5	27	1:35	NCSU	CJ Riley 9-yard touchdown reception from Ryan Finley, Christopher Dunn kick good	10	7
2	10:45	7	35	2:17	NCSU	49-yard field goal by Christopher Dunn	13	7
2	6:43	4	60	0:50	A&M	Trayveon Williams 2-yard touchdown run, Seth Small kick good	13	14
2	0:32	11	72	5:15	A&M	Kendrick Rogers 6-yard touchdown reception from Kellen Mond, Seth Small kick good	13	21
3	11:18				A&M	Interception returned 78 yards for touchdown by Tyrel Dodson, Seth Small kick good	13	28
3	5:44	5	82	2:30	A&M	Trayveon Williams 17-yard touchdown run, Seth Small kick good	13	35
4	13:56	1	93	0:13	A&M	Trayveon Williams 93-yard touchdown run, Seth Small kick good	13	42
4	6:17	6	38	3:14	A&M	35-yard field goal by Seth Small	13	45
4	0:22	6	34	3:30	A&M	Cullen Gillaspia 13-yard touchdown run, Daniel LaCamera kick good	13	52
"TOP" = time of possession. For other American football terms, see Glossary of American football.							13	52

=== Statistics ===
	1	2	3	4	Total
Wolfpack	3	10	0	0	13
No. 19 Aggies	7	14	14	17	52

Statistics	NCSU	A&M
First downs	15	18
Plays–yards	69–273	60–541
Rushes–yards	37–134	34–401
Passing yards	139	140
Passing: comp–att–int	19–32–2	14–26–1
Time of possession	32:57	27:03

Team	Category	Player	Statistics
NC State	Passing	Ryan Finley	19/32, 139 yds, 1 TD, 2 INT
NC State	Rushing	Reggie Gallaspy	14 car, 79 yds
NC State	Receiving	Emeka Emezie	6 rec, 36 yds
Texas A&M	Passing	Kellen Mond	14/26, 140 yds, 1 TD, 1 INT
Texas A&M	Rushing	Trayveon Williams	19 car, 236 yds, 3 TD
Texas A&M	Receiving	Kendrick Rogers	6 rec, 44 yds, 1 TD
