= Frankston High School (Texas) =

Public school in Texas, United States

Location
- 100 Perry Street; Frankston, Anderson County, Texas 75763-0428; United States; 32.061655°N 95.504955°W

Information
- School type: Public, high school
- Locale: Rural: Distant
- School district: Frankston ISD
- NCES School ID: 481977001939
- Principal: Edgar Rodriguez
- Staff: 25.03 (on an FTE basis)
- Grades: 9–12
- Enrollment: 252 (2023–2024)
- Student to teacher ratio: 10.07
- Colors: Royal Blue & White
- Athletics conference: UIL Class 3A
- Mascot: Indians
- Website: Frankston High School

Frankston High School is a public high school located in Frankston, Texas. It is part of the Frankston Independent School District located in northeastern Anderson County and classified as a 2A school by the UIL. During 2023-2024, Frankston High School had an enrollment of 252 students and a student to teacher ratio of 10.07. The school received an A from the Texas Education Agency for the 2024–2025 school year.

== Athletics ==
Frankston High School participates in the following sports

- Baseball
- Basketball
- Cross Country
- Football
- Golf
- Powerlifting
- Softball
- Track and Field
- Volleyball

=== State Title ===
- Boys Basketball
  - 1961(1A)

== Notable alumni ==
- Kendrick Rogers, professional football player
