= Drake Thomas =

American football player (born 2000)

No. 32 – Seattle Seahawks
- Position: Outside linebacker
- Roster status: Active

Personal information
- Born: February 25, 2000 (age 26); Wake Forest, North Carolina, U.S.
- Listed height: 5 ft 11 in (1.80 m)
- Listed weight: 228 lb (103 kg)

Career information
- High school: Heritage (Wake Forest, North Carolina)
- College: NC State (2019–2022)
- NFL draft: 2023: undrafted

Career history
- Las Vegas Raiders (2023)*; Seattle Seahawks (2023–present)
- * Offseason or practice squad member only

Awards and highlights
- Super Bowl champion (LX); Second-team All-ACC (2022)

Career NFL statistics as of 2026
- Total tackles: 121
- Interceptions: 1
- Pass deflections: 9
- Fumble recoveries: 1
- Sacks: 4.5
- Stats at Pro Football Reference

Drake Thomas (born February 25, 2000) is an American professional football outside linebacker for the Seattle Seahawks of the National Football League (NFL). He played college football for the NC State Wolfpack and has also been a member of the Las Vegas Raiders.

== Early life ==
Thomas was born on February 25, 2000, and grew up in Wake Forest, North Carolina. He attended Heritage High School and played as a linebacker and running back, setting the school's record for career tackles with 393 while also having 203 solo stops. Ranked by 247Sports as the 22nd-best player in the state and the 19th-best inside linebacker nationally, Thomas committed to play college football for the NC State Wolfpack.

== College career ==
As a true freshman at NC State in 2019, Thomas appeared in 12 games, three as a starter, and totaled 34 tackles and one interception. The following season, he started 10 games and had 58 total tackles, ranking 30th in the conference in tackles-per-game and placing fifth on the team. He led the Wolfpack in tackles in 2021 while starting 12 games, earning first-team all-conference and fourth-team All-American honors with 100 total tackles, six sacks and three interceptions. As a senior in 2022, Thomas was named a team captain and second-team all-conference while compiling 101 tackles and 7.5 sacks. He finished his collegiate career with 293 tackles, four interceptions and 19.5 sacks in 47 games played.

== Professional career ==
Pre-draft measurables
Height	Weight	Arm length	Hand span	Wingspan	40-yard dash	10-yard split	20-yard split	20-yard shuttle	Three-cone drill	Vertical jump	Broad jump	Bench press
5 ft 11 1/4 in (1.81 m)	223 lb (101 kg)	29 5/8 in (0.75 m)	9 3/8 in (0.24 m)	6 ft 0 1/4 in (1.84 m)	4.70 s	1.63 s	2.50 s	4.31 s	7.10 s	36.5 in (0.93 m)	9 ft 8 in (2.95 m)	18 reps
All values from Pro Day

=== Las Vegas Raiders ===
After going unselected in the 2023 NFL draft, Thomas was signed by the Las Vegas Raiders as an undrafted free agent on May 13, 2023. He was waived by the Raiders on August 29.

=== Seattle Seahawks ===
On August 30, 2023, Thomas was claimed off waivers by the Seattle Seahawks. He was placed on injured reserve on November 6.

On July 18, 2024, Thomas was placed on the Active/PUP list. On August 12, he was removed from the PUP list after he passed his physical. He played in all seventeen 2024 games including 70% of the special teams snaps and a few dozen snaps on defense. In 2025, he helped cover injured secondary players, earning more playing time from his continued performance improvement. Through Week 7 he played 50% of defensive snaps, recording 32 combined tackles,16 solo tackles as well as two sacks. He also still played 99 snaps on special teams.

On January 3, 2026, Thomas intercepted Brock Purdy during a pivotal Week 18 matchup against the San Francisco 49ers to help Seattle win the division. He had six total tackles in Super Bowl LX, a 29–13 win over the New England Patriots.

On March 11, 2026, Thomas re-signed with the Seahawks to a two-year, $8 million contract.

== NFL career statistics ==
Legend
	Won the Super Bowl
**Bold**	Career high

=== Regular season ===
Year	Team	Games		Tackles					Interceptions						Fumbles				
Year	Team	GP	GS	Cmb	Solo	Ast	Sck	TFL	Int	Yds	Avg	Lng	TD	PD	FF	Fmb	FR	Yds	TD
2023	SEA	7	0	3	1	2	0.0	0	0	0	0.0	0	0	0	0	0	0	0	0
2024	SEA	17	0	13	3	10	0.0	0	0	0	0.0	0	0	1	0	0	0	0	0
2025	SEA	17	14	**96**	**47**	**49**	**3.5**	**10**	**1**	0	0.0	0	0	**8**	0	0	**1**	**8**	0
Career		41	14	112	51	61	3.5	10	1	0	0.0	0	0	9	0	0	1	8	0

=== Postseason ===
Year	Team	Games		Tackles					Interceptions						Fumbles				
Year	Team	GP	GS	Cmb	Solo	Ast	Sck	TFL	Int	Yds	Avg	Lng	TD	PD	FF	Fmb	FR	Yds	TD
2025	SEA	3	3	18	7	11	0.0	1	0	0	0.0	0	0	0	0	0	0	0	0
Career		3	3	18	7	11	0.0	1	0	0	0.0	0	0	0	0	0	0	0	0

== Personal life ==
Thomas is a Christian. He is married to Haylie Thomas. Thomas is the younger brother of St. Louis Battlehawks wide receiver Thayer Thomas and played with him at NC State.
