= Thayer Thomas =

American football player (born 1998)

No. 83 – St. Louis Battlehawks
- Position: Wide receiver
- Roster status: Active

Personal information
- Born: May 20, 1998 (age 28); Wake Forest, North Carolina, U.S.
- Listed height: 6 ft 0 in (1.83 m)
- Listed weight: 195 lb (88 kg)

Career information
- High school: Heritage (Wake Forest)
- College: NC State (2017–2022)
- NFL draft: 2023: undrafted

Career history
- Minnesota Vikings (2023–2024)*; Denver Broncos (2025)*; St. Louis Battlehawks (2026–present)
- * Offseason or practice squad member only

Awards and highlights
- Third-team All-ACC (2020)
- Stats at Pro Football Reference

Thayer Rockne Thomas (born May 20, 1998) is an American professional football wide receiver for the St. Louis Battlehawks of the United Football League (UFL). He played college football for the NC State Wolfpack and was signed by the Minnesota Vikings as an undrafted free agent in 2023.

== Early life ==
Thomas grew up in Wake Forest, North Carolina and attended Heritage High School. In his high school career, he racked in 74 receptions for 965 yards and 7 touchdowns. Thomas decided to walk on to North Carolina State.

== College career ==
Thomas started as a walk-on for the Wolfpack redshirting the 2017 season. He earned a scholarship in 2018. Thomas would go on to play five years for the Wolfpack, recording 215 receptions for 2,484 yards, and 24 touchdowns. He also added 681 return yards and a return touchdown. He would also have a slight impact as a passer going 7 for 14 for 194 yards and four touchdowns. Thomas was drafted by the Boston Red Sox in the 33rd round, with the 1,007th overall selection, of the 2019 Major League Baseball draft, but did not sign with the team and returned to NC State.

In 2020 he was named Third team All-Atlantic Coast Conference as a returner after returning 10 punts for 100 yards. His best season occurred during the 2021 season where he brought in 51 passes for 596 yards and 8 touchdowns. He also had a good season in 2022 in which he hauled in 57 receptions for 642 yards and 4 touchdowns.

During his time at NC State he set multiple records for the Wolfpack finishing 2nd all time in receptions, 2nd all time in receiving touchdowns, and 5th all time in receiving yards.

== Professional career ==
Pre-draft measurables
Height	Weight	Arm length	Hand span	Wingspan	40-yard dash	10-yard split	20-yard split	20-yard shuttle	Three-cone drill	Vertical jump	Broad jump	Bench press
6 ft 0 1/4 in (1.84 m)	198 lb (90 kg)	30 1/8 in (0.77 m)	9 in (0.23 m)	6 ft 1 1/2 in (1.87 m)	4.57 s	1.63 s	2.56 s	4.03 s	6.93 s	37.0 in (0.94 m)	10 ft 0 in (3.05 m)	15 reps
All values from Pro Day

=== Minnesota Vikings ===
After not being selected in the 2023 NFL draft, Thomas signed with the Minnesota Vikings as an undrafted free agent on May 3, 2023. He was waived by Minnesota on August 29, and was re-signed to the team's practice squad the following day.

Following the end of the regular season, the Vikings signed Thomas to a reserve/future contract on January 8, 2024. Thomas was waived by the Vikings on August 27; he was subsequently re-signed to the practice squad.

Thomas signed a reserve/future contract with Minnesota on January 16, 2025. On August 26, Thomas was waived by the Vikings as part of final roster cuts.

=== Denver Broncos ===
On September 2, 2025, Thomas was signed to the Denver Broncos' practice squad. On October 14, Thomas was placed on the practice squad injured reserve. Thomas was released by the Broncos on October 18.

=== St. Louis Battlehawks ===
On January 14, 2026, Thomas was selected by the St. Louis Battlehawks of the United Football League (UFL). He was released on March 10, and re-signed on April 16.

== Personal life ==
Thomas is the older brother of Seattle Seahawks linebacker Drake Thomas.
