= Woody Cornwell =

American painter

Woody Cornwell (January 13, 1968–2016) was an American abstract painter. He was a co-founder of Eyedrum Art & Music Gallery in Atlanta during the late 1990s, which was instrumental in expanding the alternative art scene in Atlanta.

Cornwell's art has been shown at the Swan Coach House Gallery, Vaknin Schwarz Gallery, Jacksonville Museum of Modern Art, and the Suzanne Randolph Fine Art. His work was published in New American Paintings. In Atlanta he was represented by the Sandler Hudson Gallery.

== Early life and education ==
Cornwell was born in Newberry, South Carolina, on January 13, 1968. He grew up in Macon, Georgia; Anderson, South Carolina; and Dalton, Georgia, with his parents, Elaine & Woody Sr., and his younger brother Mark. Cornwell was a natural artist who impressed his parents with his drawings at a very early age. He was a Boy Scout and an avid adventure seeker. His art career started in Dalton, when he was commissioned by the local high school for a spirit mural in the common area and a pencil drawing of the school itself.

After a brief enrollment at the University of Georgia, he followed his passion and enrolled at the Savannah College of Art and Design (SCAD), graduating with a bachelor's degree, magna cum laude. He moved to Atlanta, where he received a master's degree in fine arts from Georgia State University, and began to lay the groundwork for his first gallery venture.

== Career ==
Soon Cornwell and his roommate Marshal Avett founded the Silver Ceiling Gallery in their own apartment. After a few years, they convinced a handful of friends to create an art collective a few doors down from Silver Ceiling. In 1997, Eyedrum Art & Music Gallery was founded. This was a collective effort where each board member took responsibility for rent, although no one lived there. Their ambitious venture paid off in a golden era of experimental art and music that lasted well into the 2000s before changes began to distance Cornwell from Eyedrum.

Cornwell curated art exhibits and mentored young artists in the city. He taught art at the Atlanta College of Art, SCAD Atlanta, Callenwolde Art Center, Chastain Art Center, and the Telfair Museum in Atlanta. He was a board member of Art Pages magazine, and was on the selection committee at Forward Arts Foundation for their Emerging Artist Award. He was an important player in the first years of the Norton Arts Center in Hapeville, Georgia.

The Atlanta arts scene provided some trying times. A 2009 article in Creative Loafing described Cornwell as a "hustler."

In Atlanta, Cornwell was represented by Sandler Hudson Gallery.

== Exhibitions ==
- 2013, Norton Street Gallery, Atlanta, GA – "It's Mutual"
- 2003, Jacksonville Museum of Modern Art, Jacksonville, FL
- 2003/02 City Hall East, Atlanta, GA
- 2002 Sandler Hudson Gallery, Atlanta, GA
- Nations Bank Plaza, Barkin-Leeds, Atlanta, GA
- 2001 Swan Coach House Gallery, Atlanta, GA
- Spruill Center for the Arts, Atlanta, GA
- Lenox Art Walk, Atlanta, GA
- 2000 Vaknin/Schwarz Gallery, Atlanta, GA

== Collections ==
- Jacksonville Museum of Modern Art, Jacksonville, FL
- Lucinda Bunnen, Atlanta, GA
- Neiman Marcus, Atlanta, GA
- Office Worx, Atlanta, GA
- Georgia State University, Atlanta, GA
- Agnes Scott College, Decatur, GA
- Savannah College of Art and Design, Savannah, GA
