= Heritage High School (Wake Forest, North Carolina) =

Public school in North Carolina, United States

Location
- 1150 Forestville Road; Wake Forest, North Carolina 27587; United States; 35°56′30″N 78°30′37″W

Information
- School type: Public
- Motto: Where Students Learn, Professionals Grow, and Communities Partner
- Founded: 2010 (16 years ago)
- School district: Wake County Public Schools
- CEEB code: 344118
- Principal: Jo Ellen Newhouse
- Teaching staff: 97.57 (on an FTE basis)
- Grades: 9–12
- Enrollment: 1,817 (2023–2024)
- Student to teacher ratio: 18.62
- Colors: Navy, Silver, White
- Mascot: Husky
- Website: Heritage High School

Heritage High School is a public four year institution located in Wake Forest, North Carolina. A part of the Wake County Public School System, Heritage High School is home to over 1,800 students in 9th–12th grade. The school's attendance zone primarily serves the residents of Wake Forest, while a subsection of students from Northeast Raleigh are bused in. A 4x4 block schedule is used, meaning that pupils take 4 different classes per semester, and alternate classes in January. The current principal is Jo Ellen Newhouse, with Dr. Beth Daniels as the main Assistant Principal. Heritage remains a competitive institution with a graduation rate of 90%, and over 60% of students taking at least one AP exam. 22 varsity sports are offered, and over 50 leadership/service clubs are available for students to join. Before 2024, an enrollment cap was put in place to prevent overcrowding due to the explosive population growth; that cap has now been removed. Prospective students can apply to Heritage via the WCPSS website.

== History ==
Heritage High School opened in 2010 in response to rapid population growth throughout Wake Forest. During the 2009–2010 school year, the campus was used by the students and staff of Wake Forest-Rolesville High School while their campus underwent renovations. When Heritage opened, educators from a variety of surrounding high schools were brought in, including former Wakefield High School principal Mark Savage.

When Heritage first opened, it was only occupied by students in 9th and 10th grades. In this first year, Heritage trotted out varsity teams in every sport with the exception of football. In the 2011–2012 school year, the building was three-fourths occupied due to the addition of another freshman class. The school was finally filled with all four classes in the 2012–2013 school year. The 2012–2013 year also marked Heritage's first-ever graduating class.

Starting in the 2013–2014 school year, the Heritage High School Game Art and Design Academy was formed in efforts to bring a STEM specialization to Heritage. The program spanned the course of three freshman cohorts, the first being the only to fully complete the program.

In the 2017–2018 school year, the program was suddenly abandoned after program coordinator Leonard Bullock resigned from his position with the school. Qualifying members of the second cohort were given an opportunity to complete the program via an internship with the North Carolina Department of Health and Human Services as IT assistants.

During the 2019-2020 school year, due to the COVID-19 pandemic, pupils were offered two options for final grades: numeric or PC19/WC19. Numeric grades were scored on a standard basis, from a scale of 0 to 100. Regarding the other option: PC19 represented a passing grades counting towards graduation while WC19 did not.

During the 2020-2021 school year, a virtual academy was offered throughout WCPSS, where students could opt in to learn remotely for the fall and spring semesters. The academy remained throughout 2022.

On July 19, 2016, WCPSS announced that Heritage principal Mark Savage would be promoted to the Western Area Superintendent. As his replacement, Former Enloe principal Scott Lyons would be moved to Heritage.

In the 2024–2025 school year, Mr. Lyons announced his retirement. As a result, a community-wide election was conducted with Lauren Weaver, the Dean of Students and Jo Ellen Newhouse, the Heritage Middle School principal on the ballot. Mrs. Newhouse won the majority and was inducted as principal in 2024.

=== Awards ===
After the first graduating class, Mark Savage was named WCPSS Principal of the Year in 2013, an impressive accomplishment for a new high school. The following year, Heritage teacher Allison Reid was named the Wake County Teacher of the Year for her outstanding ability to integrate technology into instruction. In 2016, Miles Macleod, another Heritage educator, was named Wake County Teacher of the Year for his work in establishing a culture of service and global knowledge at the school through the creation of Project Wisdom organization. Heritage became the first Wake County school to ever have two different educators win the award in three years. From 2015-2017, Heritage High School was a PTA School of Excellence.

== School functions ==
=== Student clubs ===
Notable student organizations include: Fellowship of Christian Athletes, Science Olympiad, Model United Nations, FFA, Queer Inclusivity Organization, Student Government Association, Key Club, National Achievers Society, Art Club, International Club, and National Honor Society. Other clubs include various honor societies, community outreach programs, extracurricular foreign-language and culture clubs (French, Spanish, Chinese and Asian Culture), and athletic boosters.

=== Hooligans ===
The Hooligans are an award-winning student section. Named after their behavior, the Hooligans are widely known to be some of the most rambunctious fans in North Carolina high school sports. Operating out of Heritage High School's Spirit Club, the Hooligans are the only student section to win HighSchoolOT.com's "Student Section Showdown" in back-to-back years (2013 and 2014).

=== Theater ===
The theater was established in the same year that Heritage opened: 2010. The program has put on numerous productions every semester. Bryan Phoebus is the current theater director. A Booster Club, composed of parents and other community members provide oversight for the Heritage High School Theater program. In 2026, "FOOTLOOSE" the musical was produced.

=== Newspaper ===
The Heritage Herald served as the school's newspaper up until 2025, when Jeff Schweickert departed. The Herald reported on a variety of topics surrounding the school, from satirical posts to opinionated pieces. Around 6 students wrote for the paper, with the Editor-in-Chief providing support.

=== Band ===
The band features three competitive ensembles: the Marching Band, which includes Color Guard; Winterguard; and HIPE (Heritage Indoor Percussion Ensemble). The program also offers Concert, Jazz, and Guitar Band.

=== Graduation ===
Annually, a graduation ceremony is held at the Raleigh Convention Center. The vast majority of alumni go on to pursue a 4-year education. Per Class of 2024 statistics, 61% of graduates planned to attend a 4-year institution, 25% business, trade, or 2-year school, 10% employment, and 3% military enlistment. Heritage's proximity to the triangle means that many of its graduates will go on to attend UNC Chapel Hill, NCSU, ECU, and various other institutions in North Carolina.

== Athletics ==
Heritage Huskies
- School: Heritage High School
- NCHSAA: Class 7A
- Conference: Northern Six 6A/7A
- Location: Wake Forest, NC
- Colors: Navy, Silver, and White
- Website: Heritage Athletics Dept.

As a public high school, Heritage is a member of the North Carolina High School Athletic Association. They compete in the Northern 6A/7A Conference as a 7A school.

=== Sports teams ===
- Baseball
- Basketball (men's and women's)
- Cheerleading (men's and women's)
- Cross country (men's and women's)
- Football
- Golf (men's and women's)
- Lacrosse (men's and women's)
- Soccer (men's and women's)
- Softball
- Swimming (men's and women's)
- Stunt
- Track and field (indoor and outdoor; men's and women's)
- Tennis (men's and women's)
- Volleyball
- Wrestling

=== State Championships ===
- Cheerleading: 2015 (Small Varsity D1), 2018 (Small Varsity D1B), 2016 (Medium Varsity D1A), 2021 (Varsity Coed Game Day)
- Women's Soccer: 2019 (4A)

== Notable alumni ==
- Trent Harris, MLB pitcher
- Ricky Person Jr., NFL running back
- Drake Thomas, NFL linebacker
- Thayer Thomas, NFL wide receiver
