= Otaro Alaka =

American football player (born 1996)

No. 50
- Position: Linebacker

Personal information
- Born: May 18, 1996 (age 30); Houston, Texas, U.S.
- Listed height: 6 ft 3 in (1.91 m)
- Listed weight: 239 lb (108 kg)

Career information
- High school: Cypress Falls (Houston)
- College: Texas A&M
- NFL draft: 2019: undrafted

Career history
- Baltimore Ravens (2019–2021); Arlington Renegades (2023)

Awards and highlights
- XFL champion (2023)

Career NFL statistics
- Total tackles: 1
- Stats at Pro Football Reference

Otaro Alaka (born May 18, 1996) is an American former professional football player who was a linebacker in the National Football League (NFL). He played college football for the Texas A&M Aggies.

== College career ==
Alaka was a member of the Aggies at Texas A&M University for five seasons. He became a starter at linebacker midway through his freshman year and finished the season with 33 tackles including 3.5 tackles for loss. He suffered a season-ending injury three games into his sophomore year and used a medical redshirt. As a senior, Alaka led the Aggies with 79 tackles and 14.5 tackles for loss. Alaka finished his collegiate career with 276 tackles, 40 tackles for loss and 11 sacks in 53 games played with 45 starts.

== Professional career ==
=== Baltimore Ravens ===
Alaka was signed by the Baltimore Ravens as an undrafted free agent on April 28, 2019. Olaka made the initial 53-man roster out of training camp, but was placed on injured reserve with a hamstring injury before appearing in any games on September 28.

Alaka was named to the Ravens' active roster out of training camp again in 2020. He made his professional debut in a 38–6 win against the Cleveland Browns. In Week 5 against the Cincinnati Bengals, Alaka suffered a season-ending knee injury and was placed on injured reserve on October 12, 2020.

On August 31, 2021, Alaka was waived/injured by the Ravens and placed on injured reserve.

=== Arlington Renegades ===
Alaka was selected by the Arlington Renegades in the 2023 XFL draft. He was placed on the reserve list by the team on March 11, 2023, and activated on May 16. He was not part of the roster after the 2024 UFL dispersal draft on January 15, 2024.

== Personal life ==
Both of his parents emigrated from Nigeria and are attorneys.
