= Ryan Finley (American football) =

American football player (born 1994)

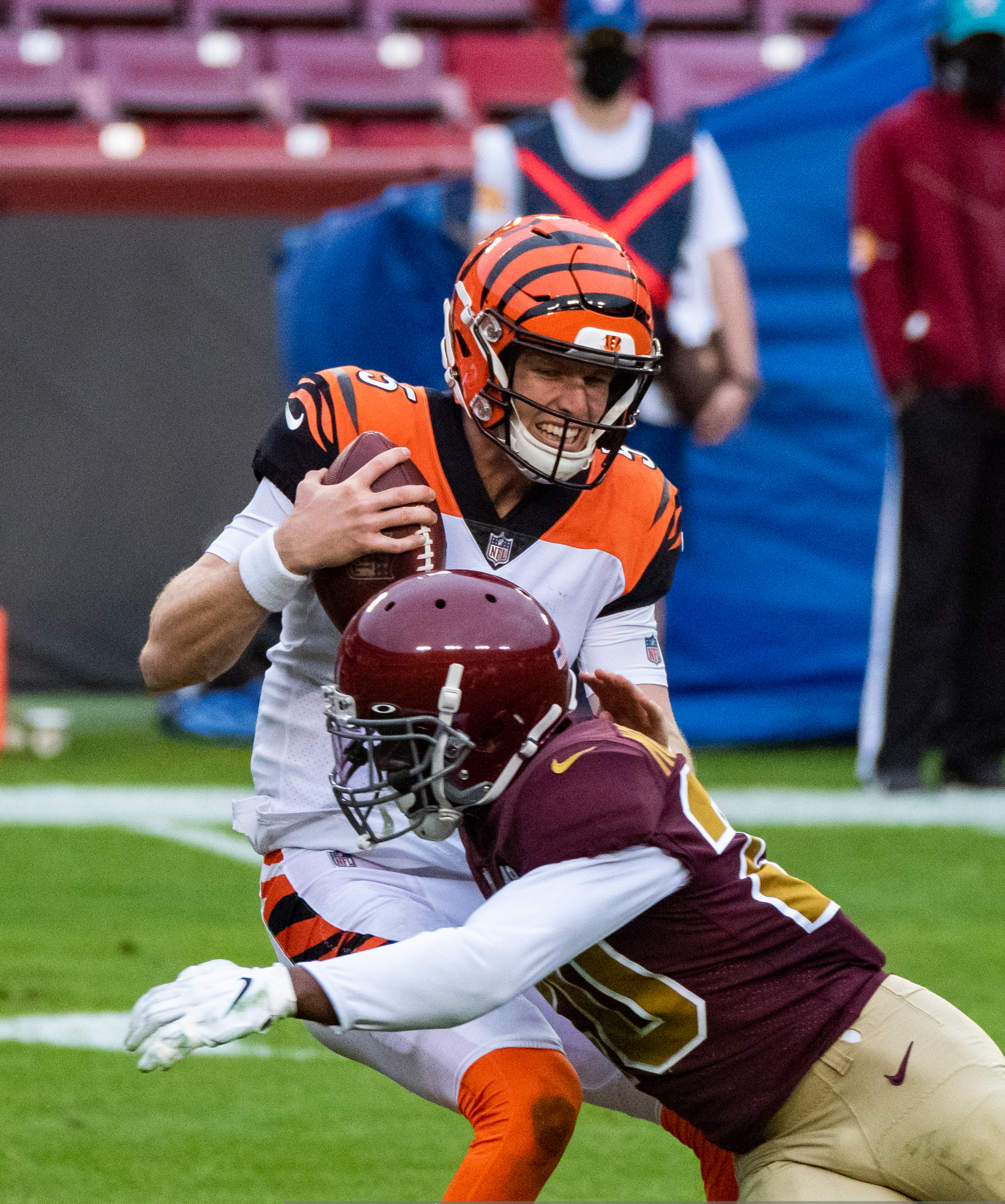
- Finley with the Cincinnati Bengals in 2020

No. 5
- Position: Quarterback

Personal information
- Born: December 26, 1994 (age 31); Phoenix, Arizona, U.S.
- Listed height: 6 ft 4 in (1.93 m)
- Listed weight: 207 lb (94 kg)

Career information
- High school: Paradise Valley (Phoenix)
- College: Boise State (2013–2015); NC State (2016–2018)
- NFL draft: 2019: 4th round, 104th overall pick

Career history
- Cincinnati Bengals (2019–2020); Houston Texans (2021)*
- * Offseason or practice squad member only

Awards and highlights
- First-team All-ACC (2018); Third-team All-ACC (2017)

Career NFL statistics
- Passing attempts: 119
- Passing completions: 58
- Completion percentage: 48.7%
- TD–INT: 3–4
- Passing yards: 638
- Passer rating: 59.4
- Stats at Pro Football Reference

Ryan Finley (born December 26, 1994) is an American former professional football player who was a quarterback for two seasons in the National Football League (NFL). He played college football for the Boise State Broncos and NC State Wolfpack and was selected by the Cincinnati Bengals in the fourth round of the 2019 NFL draft.

== Early life ==
Finley attended Paradise Valley High School in Phoenix, Arizona. As a senior he passed for 3,442 yards with 35 touchdowns. He committed to Boise State University to play college football.

== College career ==
After redshirting his first year at Boise State in 2013, Finley played in five games in 2014, completing 12 of 27 passes for 161 yards with two touchdowns and an interception. He was named the starting quarterback for Boise State his redshirt sophomore year in 2015. He played in three games before suffering a season-ending ankle injury. In the three games, Finley completed 46 of 70 passes for 455 yards, one touchdown, and four interceptions.

After the season he transferred to NC State University. In his first season at NC State, he completed 243 of 402 passes (60.4%) for 3,059 yards, 18 touchdowns and eight interceptions.

In Finley's redshirt junior year, he completed 312 of 479 passes (65.1%) for 3,518 yards, 17 touchdowns, and 6 interceptions. He also rushed 69 times for 194 yards and 3 touchdowns and caught 2 passes for 18 yards. He was also named to the Academic All-Atlantic Coast Conference team for earning a 3.889 GPA.

== Professional career ==
Pre-draft measurables
Height	Weight	Arm length	Hand span	40-yard dash	10-yard split	20-yard split	20-yard shuttle	Three-cone drill	Vertical jump	Broad jump	Wonderlic
6 ft 4 in (1.93 m)	213 lb (97 kg)	32 7/8 in (0.84 m)	9 1/2 in (0.24 m)	4.73 s	1.57 s	2.75 s	4.20 s	7.20 s	30.5 in (0.77 m)	9 ft 8 in (2.95 m)	28, 43
All values from NFL Combine

=== Cincinnati Bengals ===
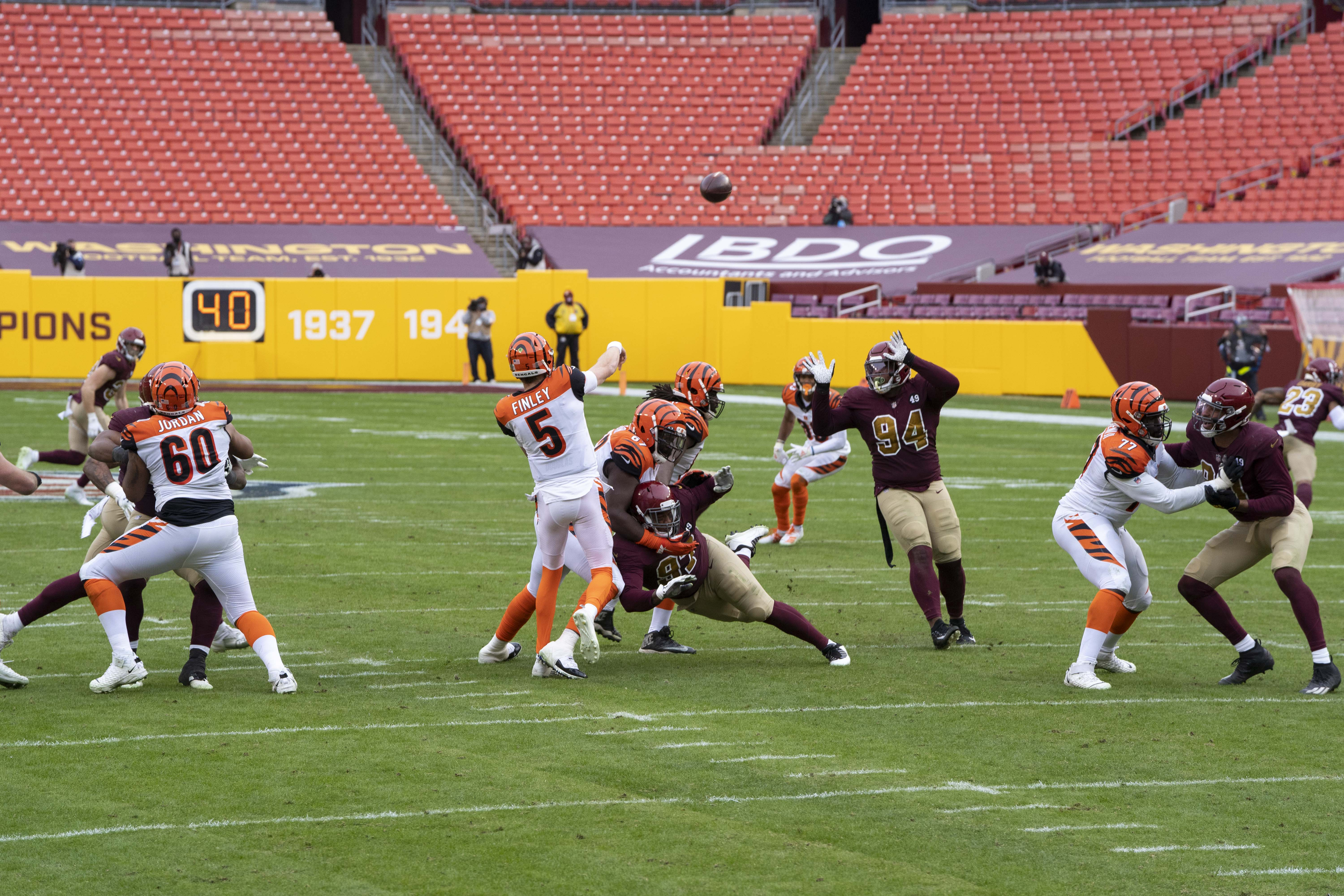
Finley attempting a throw against the Washington Football Team in 2020

Finley was selected by the Cincinnati Bengals in the fourth round (104th overall) of the 2019 NFL draft. After opening the season as the backup quarterback to Andy Dalton, Finley was named the starter on October 29, 2019. Finley made his first start in Week 10 against the Baltimore Ravens. In the game, Finley threw for 167 yards, one touchdown, and one interception in the 49–13 loss. In Week 12 against the Pittsburgh Steelers, Finley threw for 192 yards and a touchdown and lost two fumbles in the 16–10 loss. On the next day, Finley was benched for Dalton after going 0–3 in his three starts.

On November 22, 2020, against the Washington Football Team, Finley came into the game in the third quarter after starter Joe Burrow left the game with a left leg injury. Finley completed 3 of 10 passes for 30 yards, an interception, and a 0.0 passer rating as the Bengals lost 20–9. The following week, Bengals coach Zac Taylor named Brandon Allen the starting quarterback over Finley. Finley was named the starter for the Week 15 matchup against the Steelers. Finley passed for 89 yards and a touchdown, and had 47 yards rushing, including a 23 yard rushing touchdown during the 27–17 win against the heavily favored Steelers, marking Finley's first win as an NFL quarterback.

=== Houston Texans ===
On March 19, 2021, the Bengals traded Finley and a seventh-round pick to the Houston Texans for a sixth-round pick. He was waived by the Texans on May 24.

== Career statistics ==
=== NFL ===
Year	Team	Games		Passing								Rushing				Sacks		Fumbles	
Year	Team	GP	GS	Cmp	Att	Pct	Yds	Avg	TD	Int	Rtg	Att	Yds	Avg	TD	Sck	SckY	Fum	Lost
2019	CIN	3	3	41	87	47.1	474	5.4	2	2	62.1	10	77	7.7	0	11	93	4	3
2020	CIN	5	1	17	32	53.1	164	5.1	1	2	22.8	11	66	6.0	1	9	63	0	0
Career		8	4	58	119	48.7	638	5.4	3	4	54.3	21	143	6.8	1	20	156	4	3

=== College ===
Season	Team	Class	GP	Passing								Rushing			
Season	Team	Class	GP	Cmp	Att	Pct	Yds	Avg	TD	Int	Rtg	Att	Yds	Avg	TD
2013	Boise State	FR	0	(redshirt) Redshirted											
2014	Boise State	FR	4	12	27	44.4	161	6.0	2	1	111.6	7	31	4.4	0
2015	Boise State	SO	3	46	70	65.7	485	6.9	1	4	117.2	22	42	1.9	0
2016	NC State	JR	13	243	402	60.4	3,059	7.6	18	8	135.2	74	94	1.3	1
2017	NC State	JR	13	311	478	65.1	3,514	7.4	17	6	136.0	69	194	2.8	3
2018	NC State	SR	13	326	484	67.4	3,928	8.1	25	11	148.0	42	21	0.5	1
Boise State total			7	58	97	59.8	646	6.7	3	5	115.6	29	73	2.5	0
NC State total			39	880	1,364	64.5	10,501	7.7	60	25	140.0	185	309	1.7	5
Career			46	938	1,461	64.2	11,147	7.6	63	30	138.4	214	382	1.8	5

== Personal life ==
Finley was born and raised in Phoenix, Arizona. Both of his parents were college athletes at St. Olaf College; his mother, Robin, played women's tennis, and his father, Pat, played football. His younger brother, Ben, is also currently a quarterback for the Akron Zips.
