= Cullen Gillaspia =

American football player (born 1995)

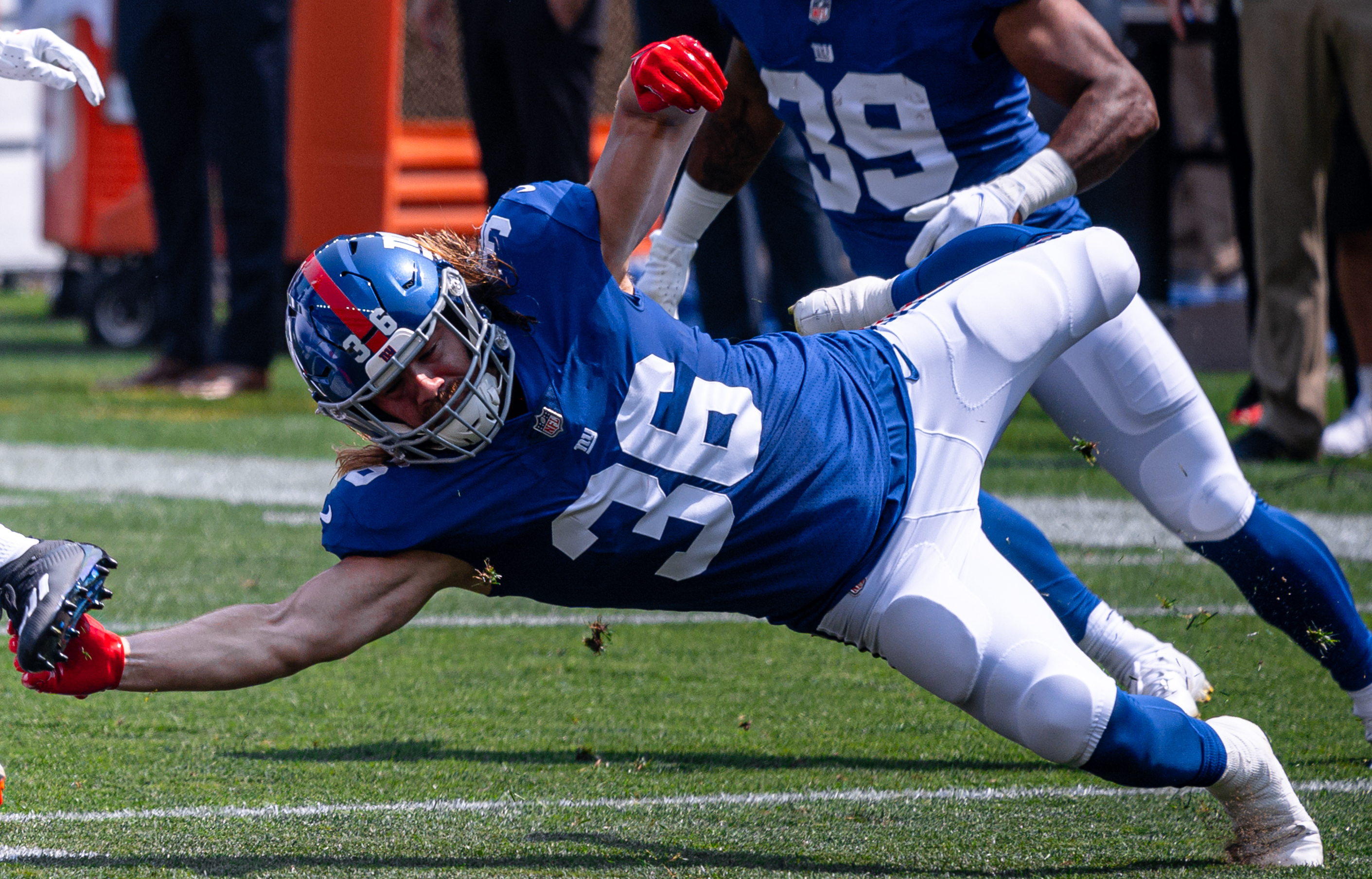
- Gillaspia with the New York Giants in 2021

Profile
- Positions: Fullback; Linebacker; Special teamer

Personal information
- Born: May 12, 1995 (age 31); Katy, Texas, U.S.
- Listed height: 6 ft 2 in (1.88 m)
- Listed weight: 235 lb (107 kg)

Career information
- High school: Taylor (Katy, Texas)
- College: Texas A&M (2014–2018)
- NFL draft: 2019: 7th round, 220th overall pick

Career history
- Houston Texans (2019–2020); New York Giants (2021); Seattle Seahawks (2022)

Career NFL statistics
- Receptions: 1
- Receiving yards: 6
- Stats at Pro Football Reference

Cullen Gillaspia (born May 12, 1995) is an American professional football linebacker. He played college football at Texas A&M.

== Early life ==
Gillaspia attended and played high school football at James E. Taylor High School.

== College career ==
Gillaspia walked on to the Texas A&M team as a linebacker. He tied Texas A&M's record for most games played as the 12th man. Coming into his senior season, Gillaspia moved from linebacker to fullback as Jimbo Fisher shifted to a pro-style offense. He started at fullback in every game and rushed for 33 yards on five carries and caught five passes for 52 yards. Gillaspia recorded six tackles on special teams in 2018. In his final play, Gillaspia scored a 13-yard rushing touchdown in A&M's 52–13 win over NC State in the Gator Bowl, the first touchdown by a 12th man in program history

== Professional career ==
Pre-draft measurables
| Height | Weight | Arm length | Hand span | 40-yard dash | 10-yard split | 20-yard split | 20-yard shuttle | Three-cone drill | Vertical jump | Broad jump | Bench press |
|---|---|---|---|---|---|---|---|---|---|---|---|
| 6 ft 1 1/4 in (1.86 m) | 234 lb (106 kg) | 30 3/4 in (0.78 m) | 9 1/8 in (0.23 m) | 4.54 s | 1.65 s | 2.65 s | 4.28 s | 6.95 s | 32.5 in (0.83 m) | 9 ft 4 in (2.84 m) | 20 reps |
All values from Pro Day

=== Houston Texans ===
Gillaspia was drafted by the Houston Texans in the seventh round, 220th overall, of the 2019 NFL draft. He played 12 snaps on offense during the regular season. In the American Football Conference wild card game, Gillaspia made a crucial block on two Bills defenders to set up Deshaun Watson for a touchdown run in a 22–19 overtime victory. In Week 3 of the 2020 regular season, Cullen Gillaspia caught his first career reception, against the Pittsburgh Steelers. It went for 6 yards.

On December 5, 2020, Gillaspia was placed on injured reserve. He was waived with a "failed physical" designation on March 9, 2021.

=== New York Giants ===
Gillaspia signed with the New York Giants on March 16, 2021. He played in 15 of the 17 games, recording four tackles (two solo).

=== Seattle Seahawks ===
On September 28, 2022, Gillaspia was signed to the practice squad of the Seattle Seahawks. He was promoted to the active roster on October 12. He was placed on injured reserve on November 12 after suffering a knee injury that would require surgery.
