= Kendrick Rogers =

American football player (born 1997)

Profile
- Position: Wide receiver

Personal information
- Born: August 7, 1997 (age 29); Frankston, Texas, U.S.
- Listed height: 6 ft 4 in (1.93 m)
- Listed weight: 208 lb (94 kg)

Career information
- High school: Frankston (Frankston, Texas)
- College: Texas A&M (2016–2019)
- NFL draft: 2020: undrafted

Career history
- Dallas Cowboys (2020)*
- * Offseason or practice squad member only
- Stats at Pro Football Reference

Kendrick Rogers Jr. (born August 7, 1997) is an American former professional football player. He was a wide receiver in the National Football League (NFL). He played college football at Texas A&M.

== Early life ==
Rogers attended Frankston High School in Frankston, Texas. As a senior, he caught 29 passes for 559 yards and six touchdowns. He also played safety and had 84 tackles and four interceptions. Rogers was rated by the Rivals.com recruiting network as a three-star recruit. He committed to Texas A&M on June 9, 2015.

== College career ==
Rogers was redshirted during his true freshman season in 2016. During the 2017 season, he appeared in all 13 games and started one of them, finishing the season with 11 caught passes for 99 yards. During the 2018 season, he appeared in 12 games, finishing the season with 27 caught passes for 336 yards and five touchdowns. During the 2019 season, he played in all 13 games and started seven of them, finishing the season with 30 caught passes for 351 yards and two touchdowns, along with one solo tackle.

Following the 2019 season, Rogers announced that he would forgo his final year of eligibility and declared for 2020 NFL draft. He competed in the NFL Scouting Combine.

== Professional career ==
Pre-draft measurables
Height	Weight	Arm length	Hand span	40-yard dash	10-yard split	20-yard split	20-yard shuttle	Three-cone drill	Vertical jump	Broad jump	Bench press
6 ft 4 1/4 in (1.94 m)	208 lb (94 kg)	33 1/8 in (0.84 m)	9 1/8 in (0.23 m)	4.51 s	1.48 s	2.65 s	4.48 s	7.13 s	35.5 in (0.90 m)	10 ft 4 in (3.15 m)	17 reps
All values from NFL Scouting Combine

Rogers was not selected in the 2020 NFL draft. He signed with the Dallas Cowboys as an undrafted free agent. Rogers was waived by Dallas on August 9, 2020 as a part of roster cuts.

Rogers was drafted by the San Antonio Brahmas of the XFL. The Brahmas used the 19th pick in the 3rd round of the 2023 XFL draft.
