= NC State Wolfpack football statistical leaders =

The NC State Wolfpack football statistical leaders are individual statistical leaders of the NC State Wolfpack football program in various categories, including passing, rushing, receiving, total offense, defensive stats, and kicking. Within those areas, the lists identify single-game, single-season, and career leaders. The Wolfpack represent North Carolina State University in the NCAA's Atlantic Coast Conference.

Although NC State began competing in intercollegiate football in 1892, the school's official record book does not generally lists records from before the 1960s, as records from before this decade are often incomplete and inconsistent.

These lists are dominated by more recent players for several reasons:

- Since the 1960s, seasons have increased from 10 games to 11 and then 12 games in length.
- The NCAA didn't allow freshmen to play varsity football until 1972 (with the exception of the World War II years), allowing players to have four-year careers.
- Bowl games only began counting toward single-season and career statistics in 2002. The Wolfpack have played in 10 bowl games since this decision, giving many recent players an extra game to accumulate statistics.

These lists are updated through Week 11 of the 2026 season. Active players are listed in bold.

== Passing ==
=== Passing yards ===
Career
| Rk | Player | Yards | Years |
|---|---|---|---|
| 1 | Philip Rivers | 13,484 | 2000 2001 2002 2003 |
| 2 | Ryan Finley | 10,501 | 2016 2017 2018 |
| 3 | Jamie Barnette | 9,461 | 1996 1997 1998 1999 |
| 4 | Russell Wilson | 8,545 | 2008 2009 2010 |
| 5 | **CJ Bailey** | 7,807 | 2024 2025 2026 |
| 6 | Mike Glennon | 7,411 | 2009 2010 2011 2012 |
| 7 | Devin Leary | 6,807 | 2019 2020 2021 2022 |
| 8 | Terry Harvey | 5,925 | 1991 1993 1994 1995 |
| 9 | Shane Montgomery | 5,298 | 1987 1988 1989 |
| 10 | Jacoby Brissett | 5,268 | 2014 2015 |

Single season
| Rk | Player | Yards | Year |
|---|---|---|---|
| 1 | Philip Rivers | 4,491 | 2003 |
| 2 | Mike Glennon | 4,031 | 2012 |
| 3 | Ryan Finley | 3,928 | 2018 |
| 4 | Russell Wilson | 3,563 | 2010 |
| 5 | Ryan Finley | 3,518 | 2017 |
| 6 | Devin Leary | 3,433 | 2021 |
| 7 | Philip Rivers | 3,353 | 2002 |
| 8 | Jamie Barnette | 3,169 | 1998 |
| 9 | CJ Bailey | 3,105 | 2025 |
| 10 | Ryan Finley | 3,059 | 2016 |

Single game
| Rk | Player | Yards | Year | Opponent |
|---|---|---|---|---|
| 1 | Shane Montgomery | 535 | 1989 | Duke |
| 2 | Mike Glennon | 493 | 2012 | Clemson |
| 3 | Philip Rivers | 475 | 2003 | Kansas |
| 4 | Ryan Finley | 473 | 2018 | Syracuse |
| 5 | Jamie Barnette | 469 | 1998 | Baylor |
| 6 | Shane Montgomery | 468 | 1987 | Duke |
| 7 | Mike Glennon | 467 | 2012 | North Carolina |
| 8 | Mike Glennon | 440 | 2012 | Miami |
| 9 | Philip Rivers | 433 | 2003 | Wake Forest |
| 10 | Philip Rivers | 423 | 2003 | North Carolina |

=== Passing touchdowns ===
Career
| Rk | Player | TDs | Years |
|---|---|---|---|
| 1 | Philip Rivers | 95 | 2000 2001 2002 2003 |
| 2 | Russell Wilson | 76 | 2008 2009 2010 |
| 3 | Mike Glennon | 63 | 2009 2010 2011 2012 |
| 4 | Devin Leary | 62 | 2019 2020 2021 2022 |
| 5 | Ryan Finley | 60 | 2016 2017 2018 |
| 6 | Jamie Barnette | 59 | 1996 1997 1998 1999 |
| 7 | **CJ Bailey** | 56 | 2024 2025 2026 |
| 8 | Jacoby Brissett | 43 | 2014 2015 |
| 9 | Terry Harvey | 38 | 1991 1993 1994 1995 |
| 10 | Shane Montgomery | 31 | 1987 1988 1989 |

Single season
| Rk | Player | TDs | Year |
|---|---|---|---|
| 1 | Devin Leary | 35 | 2021 |
| 2 | Philip Rivers | 34 | 2003 |
| 3 | Russell Wilson | 31 | 2009 |
| | Mike Glennon | 31 | 2011 |
| | Mike Glennon | 31 | 2012 |
| 6 | Russell Wilson | 28 | 2010 |
| 7 | Philip Rivers | 25 | 2000 |
| | Ryan Finley | 25 | 2018 |
| | CJ Bailey | 25 | 2025 |
| 10 | Jacoby Brissett | 23 | 2014 |

Single game
| Rk | Player | TDs | Year | Opponent |
|---|---|---|---|---|
| 1 | Terry Harvey | 5 | 1995 | Wake Forest |
| | Philip Rivers | 5 | 2000 | Indiana |
| | Philip Rivers | 5 | 2002 | Navy |
| | Philip Rivers | 5 | 2003 | Kansas |
| | Russell Wilson | 5 | 2009 | Florida State |
| | Mike Glennon | 5 | 2011 | Maryland |
| | Mike Glennon | 5 | 2012 | North Carolina |
| | Mike Glennon | 5 | 2012 | Clemson |

== Rushing ==
=== Rushing yards ===
Career
| Rk | Player | Yards | Years |
|---|---|---|---|
| 1 | Ted Brown | 4,602 | 1975 1976 1977 1978 |
| 2 | Joe McIntosh | 3,642 | 1981 1982 1983 1984 |
| 3 | Tremayne Stephens | 3,553 | 1994 1995 1996 1997 |
| 4 | Matthew Dayes | 2,856 | 2013 2014 2015 2016 |
| 5 | Ray Robinson | 2,781 | 1998 1999 2000 2001 |
| 6 | Anthony Barbour | 2,575 | 1988 1989 1991 1992 |
| 7 | Shadrach Thornton | 2,572 | 2012 2013 2014 2015 |
| 8 | Stan Fritts | 2,542 | 1972 1973 1974 |
| 9 | Andre Brown | 2,539 | 2005 2006 2007 2008 |
| 10 | Willie Burden | 2,529 | 1971 1972 1973 |

Single season
| Rk | Player | Yards | Year |
|---|---|---|---|
| 1 | Ted Brown | 1,350 | 1978 |
| 2 | Ted Brown | 1,251 | 1977 |
| 3 | Anthony Barbour | 1,204 | 1992 |
| 4 | Joe McIntosh | 1,190 | 1981 |
| 5 | Stan Fritts | 1,169 | 1974 |
| 6 | Matthew Dayes | 1,166 | 2016 |
| 7 | Tremayne Stephens | 1,142 | 1997 |
| 8 | Nyheim Hines | 1,112 | 2017 |
| 9 | T. A. McLendon | 1,101 | 2002 |
| 10 | Reggie Gallaspy II | 1,091 | 2018 |

Single game
| Rk | Player | Yards | Year | Opponent |
|---|---|---|---|---|
| 1 | Ted Brown | 251 | 1977 | Penn State |
| 2 | Andre Brown | 248 | 2005 | Southern Miss |
| 3 | Ted Brown | 227 | 1975 | Clemson |
| 4 | Joe McIntosh | 220 | 1981 | Wake Forest |
| 5 | Reggie Gallaspy II | 220 | 2018 | East Carolina |
| 6 | Matthew Dayes | 205 | 2015 | Wake Forest |
| 7 | Ray Robinson | 202 | 1998 | Virginia |
| 8 | Vince Evans | 201 | 1985 | East Carolina |
| 9 | Ted Brown | 198 | 1978 | Syracuse |
| | Willie Burden | 198 | 1971 | Kent State |

=== Rushing touchdowns ===
Career
| Rk | Player | TDs | Years |
|---|---|---|---|
| 1 | Ted Brown | 49 | 1975 1976 1977 1978 |
| 2 | Stan Fritts | 41 | 1972 1973 1974 |
| 3 | Matthew Dayes | 34 | 2013 2014 2015 2016 |
| 4 | T. A. McLendon | 33 | 2002 2003 2004 |
| 5 | Reggie Gallaspy II | 31 | 2015 2016 2017 2018 |
| 6 | Ray Robinson | 30 | 1998 1999 2000 2001 |
| 7 | Jaylen Samuels | 26 | 2014 2015 2016 2017 |
| 8 | Gary Downs | 23 | 1990 1991 1992 1993 |
| | Tremayne Stephens | 23 | 1994 1995 1996 1997 |
| 10 | Willie Burden | 22 | 1971 1972 1973 |
| | Andre Brown | 22 | 2005 2006 2007 2008 |

Single season
| Rk | Player | TDs | Year |
|---|---|---|---|
| 1 | T. A. McLendon | 18 | 2002 |
| 2 | Reggie Gallaspy II | 18 | 2018 |
| 3 | Stan Fritts | 16 | 1972 |
| 4 | Stan Fritts | 13 | 1973 |
| | Ted Brown | 13 | 1976 |
| | Ted Brown | 13 | 1977 |
| | Scott Smith | 13 | 1979 |
| 8 | Stan Fritts | 12 | 1974 |
| | Ted Brown | 12 | 1975 |
| | Matthew Dayes | 12 | 2015 |
| | Jaylen Samuels | 12 | 2017 |
| | Nyheim Hines | 12 | 2017 |

Single game
| Rk | Player | TDs | Year | Opponent |
|---|---|---|---|---|
| 1 | Stan Fritts | 5 | 1972 | Wake Forest |
| | T. A. McLendon | 5 | 2002 | Texas Tech |
| | Reggie Gallaspy II | 5 | 2018 | North Carolina |
| 4 | Dick Christy | 4 | 1957 | South Carolina |
| | Ted Brown | 4 | 1975 | Clemson |
| | Will Wilson | 4 | 2025 | North Carolina |

== Receiving ==
=== Receptions ===
Career
| Rk | Player | Rec | Years |
|---|---|---|---|
| 1 | Emeka Emezie | 229 | 2017 2018 2019 2020 2021 |
| 2 | Thayer Thomas | 215 | 2018 2019 2020 2021 2022 |
| 3 | Jaylen Samuels | 202 | 2014 2015 2016 2017 |
| 4 | Jerricho Cotchery | 200 | 2000 2001 2002 2003 |
| 5 | Torry Holt | 191 | 1995 1996 1997 1998 |
| 6 | Jakobi Meyers | 168 | 2016 2017 2018 |
| 7 | Eddie Goines | 147 | 1991 1992 1993 1994 |
| 8 | Bryan Peterson | 139 | 1999 2000 2001 2002 |
| 9 | Jarvis Williams | 133 | 2007 2008 2009 2010 |
| 10 | Nasrallah Worthen | 131 | 1984 1985 1986 1988 |

Single season
| Rk | Player | Rec | Year |
|---|---|---|---|
| 1 | Jakobi Meyers | 92 | 2018 |
| 2 | Torry Holt | 88 | 1998 |
| 3 | Jerricho Cotchery | 86 | 2003 |
| 4 | Jaylen Samuels | 76 | 2017 |
| 5 | Kevin Concepcion | 71 | 2023 |
| 6 | Kelvin Harmon | 69 | 2017 |
| | Tramain Hall | 69 | 2003 |
| 8 | Jerricho Cotchery | 67 | 2002 |
| 9 | Jaylen Samuels | 65 | 2015 |
| 10 | Jakobi Meyers | 63 | 2016 |

Single game
| Rk | Player | Rec | Year | Opponent |
|---|---|---|---|---|
| 1 | Torry Holt | 15 | 1998 | Wake Forest |
| | Jaylen Samuels | 15 | 2017 | South Carolina |
| 3 | Jakobi Meyers | 14 | 2018 | James Madison |
| | Emeka Emezie | 14 | 2021 | Clemson |
| 5 | Jerricho Cotchery | 13 | 2003 | Kansas |
| | Jakobi Meyers | 13 | 2018 | East Carolina |
| 7 | Torry Holt | 12 | 1997 | Florida State |
| | Jerricho Cotchery | 12 | 2002 | Maryland |
| | Emeka Emezie | 12 | 2019 | West Virginia |
| 10 | Torry Holt | 11 | 1998 | Baylor |
| | Torry Holt | 11 | 1998 | Clemson |
| | Jerricho Cotchery | 11 | 2001 | Maryland |
| | T. A. McLendon | 11 | 2003 | Virginia |
| | Donald Bowens | 11 | 2007 | Virginia |
| | Bryan Underwood | 11 | 2013 | Wake Forest |
| | Nyheim Hines | 11 | 2016 | Florida State |
| | Thayer Thomas | 11 | 2020 | Florida State |

=== Receiving yards ===
Career
| Rk | Player | Yards | Years |
|---|---|---|---|
| 1 | Torry Holt | 3,379 | 1995 1996 1997 1998 |
| 2 | Jerricho Cotchery | 3,119 | 2000 2001 2002 2003 |
| 3 | Emeka Emezie | 2,895 | 2017 2018 2019 2020 2021 |
| 4 | Kelvin Harmon | 2,665 | 2016 2017 2018 |
| 5 | Thayer Thomas | 2,484 | 2018 2019 2020 2021 2022 |
| 6 | Owen Spencer | 2,441 | 2007 2008 2009 2010 |
| 7 | Eddie Goines | 2,351 | 1991 1992 1993 1994 |
| 8 | Nasrallah Worthen | 2,247 | 1984 1985 1986 1988 |
| 9 | Mike Quick | 1,934 | 1978 1979 1980 1981 |
| 10 | Jakobi Meyers | 1,932 | 2016 2017 2018 |
| 11 | T. J. Williams | 1,916 | 2002 2003 2004 2005 |

Single season
| Rk | Player | Yards | Year |
|---|---|---|---|
| 1 | Torry Holt | 1,604 | 1998 |
| 2 | Jerricho Cotchery | 1,369 | 2003 |
| 3 | Jerricho Cotchery | 1,192 | 2002 |
| 4 | Kelvin Harmon | 1,186 | 2018 |
| 5 | Torry Holt | 1,099 | 1997 |
| 6 | Koren Robinson | 1,061 | 2000 |
| 7 | Jakobi Meyers | 1,047 | 2018 |
| 8 | Kelvin Harmon | 1,017 | 2017 |
| 9 | Eddie Goines | 928 | 1993 |
| 10 | Owen Spencer | 912 | 2010 |

Single game
| Rk | Player | Yards | Year | Opponent |
|---|---|---|---|---|
| 1 | Torry Holt | 255 | 1998 | Baylor |
| 2 | Torry Holt | 225 | 1998 | Clemson |
| 3 | Tobais Palmer | 219 | 2012 | Clemson |
| 4 | Jerricho Cotchery | 217 | 2003 | North Carolina |
| 5 | Eddie Goines | 207 | 1993 | Wake Forest |
| 6 | Donald Bowens | 202 | 2007 | Virginia |
| 7 | Nasrallah Worthen | 187 | 1986 | Maryland |
| | Adrian Hill | 187 | 1994 | Virginia |
| 9 | Torry Holt | 180 | 1998 | North Carolina |
| 10 | Torry Holt | 179 | 1998 | Wake Forest |

=== Receiving touchdowns ===
Career
| Rk | Player | TDs | Years |
|---|---|---|---|
| 1 | Torry Holt | 31 | 1995 1996 1997 1998 |
| 2 | Thayer Thomas | 24 | 2018 2019 2020 2021 2022 |
| 3 | Jerricho Cotchery | 21 | 2000 2001 2002 2003 |
| 4 | Jarvis Williams | 20 | 2007 2008 2009 2010 |
| 5 | Jaylen Samuels | 19 | 2014 2015 2016 2017 |
| | Emeka Emezie | 19 | 2017 2018 2019 2020 2021 |
| 7 | Eddie Goines | 17 | 1991 1992 1993 1994 |
| | George Bryan | 17 | 2008 2009 2010 2011 |
| 9 | Kevin Concepcion | 16 | 2023 2024 |
| | Kelvin Harmon | 16 | 2016 2017 2018 |
| 11 | Koren Robinson | 15 | 1999 2000 |
| | Owen Spencer | 15 | 2007 2008 2009 2010 |

Single season
| Rk | Player | TDs | Year |
|---|---|---|---|
| 1 | Torry Holt | 16 | 1997 |
| 2 | Koren Robinson | 13 | 2000 |
| 3 | Torry Holt | 11 | 1998 |
| | Jarvis Williams | 11 | 2009 |
| 5 | Eddie Goines | 10 | 1993 |
| | Jerricho Cotchery | 10 | 2003 |
| | Bryan Underwood | 10 | 2012 |
| | Kevin Concepcion | 10 | 2023 |

Single game
| Rk | Player | TDs | Year | Opponent |
|---|---|---|---|---|
| 1 | Torry Holt | 5 | 1997 | Florida State |
| 2 | Torry Holt | 4 | 1998 | Clemson |
| 3 | Nasrallah Worthen | 3 | 1988 | Duke |
| | Eddie Goines | 3 | 1993 | Texas Tech |
| | Koren Robinson | 3 | 2000 | Georgia Tech |
| | Jerricho Cotchery | 3 | 2001 | Clemson |
| | Tramain Hall | 3 | 2003 | Duke |
| | Jarvis Williams | 3 | 2009 | Florida State |
| | Tobais Palmer | 3 | 2012 | Clemson |
| | Jaylen Samuels | 3 | 2016 | Vanderbilt |
| | Thayer Thomas | 3 | 2020 | Syracuse |
| | Kevin Concepcion | 3 | 2024 | Western Carolina |
| | Keenan Jackson | 3 | 2026 | Vanderbilt |

== Total offense ==
Total offense is the sum of passing and rushing statistics. It does not include receiving or returns.

=== Total offense yards ===
Career
| Rk | Player | Yards | Years |
|---|---|---|---|
| 1 | Philip Rivers | 13,582 | 2000 2001 2002 2003 |
| 2 | Jamie Barnette | 9,638 | 1996 1997 1998 1999 |
| 3 | Russell Wilson | 9,628 | 2008 2009 2010 |
| 4 | **CJ Bailey** | 8,529 | 2024 2025 2026 |
| 5 | Mike Glennon | 7,131 | 2009 2010 2011 2012 |
| 6 | Devin Leary | 6,788 | 2019 2020 2021 2022 |
| 7 | Ryan Finley | 6,577 | 2016 2017 |
| 8 | Jacoby Brissett | 6,167 | 2014 2015 |
| 9 | Terry Harvey | 5,846 | 1991 1993 1994 1995 |
| 10 | Shane Montgomery | 5,155 | 1987 1988 1989 |

Single season
| Rk | Player | Yards | Year |
|---|---|---|---|
| 1 | Philip Rivers | 4,600 | 2003 |
| 2 | Russell Wilson | 3,998 | 2010 |
| 3 | Mike Glennon | 3,867 | 2012 |
| 4 | Ryan Finley | 3,712 | 2017 |
| 5 | Philip Rivers | 3,453 | 2002 |
| 6 | Devin Leary | 3,360 | 2021 |
| 7 | CJ Bailey | 3,320 | 2025 |
| 8 | Russell Wilson | 3,287 | 2009 |
| 9 | Jamie Barnette | 3,182 | 1998 |
| 10 | Ryan Finley | 3,153 | 2016 |

Single game
| Rk | Player | Yards | Year | Opponent |
|---|---|---|---|---|
| 1 | Shane Montgomery | 537 | 1989 | Duke |
| 2 | Philip Rivers | 495 | 2003 | Kansas |
| 3 | Mike Glennon | 474 | 2012 | Clemson |
| 4 | Philip Rivers | 463 | 2003 | North Carolina |
| 5 | Philip Rivers | 449 | 2003 | Florida State |
| 6 | Philip Rivers | 443 | 2003 | Wake Forest |
| 7 | Mike Glennon | 439 | 2012 | North Carolina |
| 8 | Jamie Barnette | 438 | 1998 | Baylor |
| 9 | Shane Montgomery | 431 | 1987 | Duke |
| 10 | Philip Rivers | 430 | 2003 | Virginia |

=== Total touchdowns ===
Career
| Rk | Player | TDs | Years |
|---|---|---|---|
| 1 | Philip Rivers | 112 | 2000 2001 2002 2003 |
| 2 | Russell Wilson | 93 | 2008 2009 2010 |
| 3 | Jamie Barnette | 74 | 1996 1997 1998 1999 |
| 4 | **CJ Bailey** | 70 | 2024 2025 2026 |
| 5 | Devin Leary | 67 | 2019 2020 2021 2022 |
| 6 | Mike Glennon | 66 | 2009 2010 2011 2012 |
| 7 | Ryan Finley | 65 | 2016 2017 2018 |
| 8 | Jacoby Brissett | 52 | 2014 2015 |
| | Ted Brown | 52 | 1975 1976 1977 1978 |
| 10 | Stan Fritts | 44 | 1972 1973 1974 |
| | Terry Harvey | 44 | 1991 1993 1994 1995 |

Single season
| Rk | Player | TDs | Year |
|---|---|---|---|
| 1 | Devin Leary | 37 | 2021 |
| | Philip Rivers | 37 | 2003 |
| | Russell Wilson | 37 | 2010 |
| 4 | Russell Wilson | 35 | 2009 |
| 5 | Mike Glennon | 33 | 2012 |
| 6 | Mike Glennon | 32 | 2011 |
| 7 | CJ Bailey | 31 | 2025 |
| 8 | Philip Rivers | 30 | 2002 |
| 9 | Philip Rivers | 27 | 2000 |
| 10 | Jacoby Brissett | 26 | 2014 |
| | Jacoby Brissett | 26 | 2015 |
| | Ryan Finley | 26 | 2018 |

Single game
| Rk | Player | TDs | Year | Opponent |
|---|---|---|---|---|
| 1 | Philip Rivers | 6 | 2002 | Navy |
| | Mike Glennon | 6 | 2011 | Maryland |
| | Devin Leary | 6 | 2022 | Charleston Southern |
| 4 | Stan Fritts | 5 | 1972 | Wake Forest |
| | Terry Harvey | 5 | 1995 | Wake Forest |
| | Philip Rivers | 5 | 2000 | Indiana |
| | Philip Rivers | 5 | 2002 | Navy |
| | T. A. McLendon | 5 | 2002 | Texas Tech |
| | Philip Rivers | 5 | 2003 | Kansas |
| | Russell Wilson | 5 | 2009 | Florida State |
| | Mike Glennon | 5 | 2012 | North Carolina |
| | Mike Glennon | 5 | 2012 | Clemson |
| | Reggie Gallaspy II | 5 | 2018 | North Carolina |

== Defense ==
=== Interceptions ===
Career
| Rk | Player | Ints | Years |
|---|---|---|---|
| 1 | David Amerson | 18 | 2010 2011 2012 |
| 2 | Art Rooney | 16 | 1936 1937 1938 |
| | Eric Williams | 16 | 1978 1979 1980 1981 1982 |
| 4 | Woodrow Wilson | 12 | 1977 1978 1979 |
| | Lloyd Harrison | 12 | 1996 1997 1998 1999 |

Single season
| Rk | Player | Ints | Year |
|---|---|---|---|
| 1 | David Amerson | 13 | 2011 |
| 2 | Art Rooney | 8 | 1937 |
| | Art Rooney | 8 | 1938 |
| 4 | Tony Golmont | 7 | 1965 |
| | Van Walker | 7 | 1970 |
| | Mike Devine | 7 | 1973 |
| | Eric Williams | 7 | 1981 |
| | Lloyd Harrison | 7 | 1998 |

Single game
| Rk | Player | Ints | Year | Opponent |
|---|---|---|---|---|
| 1 | Art Rooney | 3 | 1937 | Virginia Tech |
| | Art Rooney | 3 | 1938 | Wake Forest |
| | Eric Williams | 3 | 1979 | Duke |
| | John McRorie | 3 | 1983 | South Carolina |
| | Rod Johnson | 3 | 2003 | Notre Dame |

=== Tackles ===
Career
| Rk | Player | Tackles | Years |
|---|---|---|---|
| 1 | Levar Fisher | 492 | 1998 1999 2000 2001 |
| 2 | Dantonio Burnette | 476 | 1999 2000 2001 2002 |
| 3 | Damien Covington | 457 | 1991 1992 1993 1994 |
| 4 | Robert Abraham | 407 | 1978 1979 1980 1981 |
| 5 | Payton Wilson | 403 | 2019 2020 2021 2022 2023 |
| 6 | Earl Wolff | 400 | 2009 2010 2011 2012 |
| 7 | Vaughan Johnson | 384 | 1980 1981 1982 1983 |
| 8 | Bill Cowher | 371 | 1975 1976 1977 1978 |
| 9 | Billy Ray Hayes | 364 | 1988 1989 1990 1991 |
| 10 | Kyle Wescoe | 348 | 1975 1976 1977 1978 |

Single season
| Rk | Player | Tackles | Year |
|---|---|---|---|
| 1 | Bill Cowher | 195 | 1978 |
| 2 | Robert Abraham | 183 | 1981 |
| 3 | Bill Cowher | 176 | 1977 |
| 4 | David Merritt | 167 | 1992 |
| 5 | Vaughan Johnson | 167 | 1982 |
| 6 | Levar Fisher | 166 | 2000 |
| 7 | Kelvin Crooms | 161 | 1985 |

Single game
| Rk | Player | Tackles | Year | Opponent |
|---|---|---|---|---|
| 1 | Pat Teague | 26 | 1986 | Virginia Tech |
| 2 | Bill Cowher | 24 | 1977 | South Carolina |
| | Bill Cowher | 24 | 1978 | Clemson |
| | Pat Teague | 24 | 1986 | North Carolina |
| | Dantonio Burnette | 24 | 2001 | Clemson |
| 6 | Clayton White | 23 | 1998 | Ohio |
| 7 | Pat Teague | 21 | 1984 | South Carolina |
| | Levar Fisher | 21 | 2000 | Maryland |
| | Levar Fisher | 21 | 2001 | North Carolina |

=== Sacks ===
Career
| Rk | Player | Sacks | Years |
|---|---|---|---|
| 1 | Bradley Chubb | 26 | 2014 2015 2016 2017 |
| 2 | Mario Williams | 25.5 | 2003 2004 2005 |
| 3 | Tyler Lawrence | 24.0 | 1990 1991 1992 1993 |
| 4 | Art Norman | 23.5 | 2011 2012 2013 2014 |
| 5 | Carl Reeves | 22.5 | 1991 1992 1993 1994 |
| 7 | Mike Jones | 21.0 | 1987 1988 1989 1990 |
| | Manny Lawson | 21.0 | 2002 2003 2004 2005 |
| 8 | Willie Young | 20.5 | 2006 2007 2008 2009 |
| | Davin Vann | 20.5 | 2020 2021 2022 2023 2024 |
| 10 | Drake Thomas | 19.0 | 2019 2020 2021 2022 |

Single season
| Rk | Player | Sacks | Year |
|---|---|---|---|
| 1 | Mario Williams | 14.5 | 2005 |
| 2 | Tyler Lawrence | 11.0 | 1993 |
| 3 | Carl Reeves | 10.5 | 1992 |
| | Mike Rose | 10.5 | 2015 |
| | Bradley Chubb | 10.5 | 2016 |
| 6 | Mike Jones | 10.0 | 1990 |
| 7 | Dantonio Burnette | 9.0 | 2002 |
| | Shawn Price | 9.0 | 2002 |

Single game
| Rk | Player | Sacks | Year | Opponent |
|---|---|---|---|---|
| 1 | Mario Williams | 4.0 | 2005 | Maryland |
| | Mario Williams | 4.0 | 2005 | Southern Miss |
| 3 | Eric Counts | 3.5 | 1993 | Wake Forest |
| | Mario Williams | 3.5 | 2005 | Wake Forest |

== Kicking ==
=== Field goals made ===
Career
| Rk | Player | FGs | Years |
|---|---|---|---|
| 1 | Christopher Dunn | 97 | 2018 2019 2020 2021 2022 |
| 2 | Niklas Sade | 55 | 2011 2012 2013 2014 |
| 3 | Mike Cofer | 50 | 1982 1983 1984 1986 |
| 4 | Damon Hartman | 48 | 1988 1989 1990 1991 |
| 5 | Josh Czajkowski | 46 | 2008 2009 2010 |
| 6 | Steve Videtich | 42 | 1992 1993 1994 |
| 7 | John Deraney | 40 | 2003 2004 2005 2006 |
| 8 | Nathan Ritter | 33 | 1978 1979 1980 |
| 9 | Marc Primanti | 31 | 1995 1996 |
| 10 | Adam Kiker | 30 | 2000 2001 2002 2003 |

Single season
| Rk | Player | FGs | Year |
|---|---|---|---|
| 1 | Christopher Dunn | 28 | 2022 |
| 2 | Christopher Dunn | 23 | 2018 |
| 3 | Christopher Dunn | 21 | 2019 |
| 4 | Marc Primanti | 20 | 1996 |
| | Josh Czajkowski | 20 | 2010 |
| 6 | Damon Hartman | 19 | 1989 |
| | Niklas Sade | 19 | 2013 |
| 8 | Mike Cofer | 18 | 1984 |
| | Brayden Narveson | 18 | 2023 |
| | Kanoah Vinesett | 18 | 2024 |

Single game
| Rk | Player | FGs | Year | Opponent |
|---|---|---|---|---|
| 1 | Nathan Ritter | 5 | 1978 | East Carolina |
| 2 | Bryan Carter | 4 | 1987 | Duke |
| | Damon Hartman | 4 | 1988 | Wake Forest |
| | Damon Hartman | 4 | 1990 | North Carolina |
| | Steve Videtich | 4 | 1994 | Maryland |
| | Marc Primanti | 4 | 1995 | Georgia Tech |
| | Adam Kiker | 4 | 2001 | Maryland |
| | Steven Hauschka | 4 | 2007 | Miami |
| | Niklas Sade | 4 | 2013 | Louisiana Tech |
| | Niklas Sade | 4 | 2013 | North Carolina |
| | Christopher Dunn | 4 | 2019 | Florida State |
| | Christopher Dunn | 4 | 2022 | Florida State |
| | Christopher Dunn | 4 | 2022 | Maryland |
| | Brayden Narveson | 4 | 2023 | North Carolina |
| | Kanoah Vinesett | 4 | 2024 | Duke |

=== Field goal percentage ===
Career
| Rk | Player | FG% | Years |
|---|---|---|---|
| 1 | Danny Deskevich | 100.0% | 1998 |
| 2 | Marc Primanti | 93.9% | 1995 1996 |
| 3 | Steven Hauschka | 88.9% | 2007 |
| 4 | Christopher Dunn | 84.3% | 2018 2019 2020 2021 2022 |
| 5 | Josh Czajkowski | 80.7% | 2007 2008 2009 2010 |
| 6 | Nathan Ritter | 80.5% | 1978 1979 1980 |
| 7 | Adam Kiker | 78.9% | 2000 2001 2002 2003 |
| 8 | Steve Videtich | 79.2% | 1991 1992 1993 1994 |
| 9 | Brayden Narveson | 78.3% | 2023 |
| 10 | Kanoah Vinesett | 76.7% | 2023 2024 2025 |

Single season
| Rk | Player | FG% | Year |
|---|---|---|---|
| 1 | Marc Primanti | 100.0% | 1995 |
| | Danny Deskevich | 100.0% | 1998 |
| 3 | Christopher Dunn | 96.6% | 2022 |
| 4 | Adam Kiker | 92.9% | 2001 |
| 5 | Steve Videtich | 92.3% | 1993 |
| 6 | Nathan Ritter | 89.5% | 1978 |
| 7 | Steve Videtich | 88.9% | 1994 |
| | Steven Hauschka | 88.9% | 2007 |
| 9 | Christopher Dunn | 88.5% | 2018 |
| 10 | Christopher Dunn | 87.5% | 2019 |
