= List of NC State Wolfpack football seasons =

Year by year results for North Carolina State Wolfpack football, the football team representing North Carolina State University.

== Seasons ==
National champions †	Conference champions *	Division champions ‡	Bowl game berth ^

List of seasons showing head coach, conference, conference finish, division finish, wins, losses, ties, bowl games and final poll standings (Note: Statistics correct as of the end of the 2024 season.)
Season	Head coach	Conference	Conference finish	Division finish	Wins	Losses	Ties	Bowl result	AP Poll	Coaches' Poll
1892	Perrin Busbee	Independent	—	—	1	0	0	—	N/A	N/A
1893	Bart Gatling	Independent	—	—	2	0	0	—	N/A	N/A
1894	Bart Gatling	Independent	—	—	0	2	0	—	N/A	N/A
1895	Bart Gatling	Independent	—	—	1	2	1	—	N/A	N/A
1896	Perrin Busbee	Independent	—	—	1	0	0	—	N/A	N/A
1897	Perrin Busbee	Independent	—	—	1	2	0	—	N/A	N/A
1898	W. C. Riddick	Independent	—	—	0	1	0	—	N/A	N/A
1899	W. C. Riddick	Independent	—	—	0	1	0	—	N/A	N/A
1900	John McKee	Independent	—	—	0	4	0	—	N/A	N/A
1901	John McKee	Independent	—	—	1	2	0	—	N/A	N/A
1902	Arthur Devlin	Independent	—	—	3	4	2	—	N/A	N/A
1903	Arthur Devlin	Independent	—	—	4	4	0	—	N/A	N/A
1904	Willis Kienholz	Independent	—	—	3	1	2	—	N/A	N/A
1905	George S. Whitney	Independent	—	—	4	1	1	—	N/A	N/A
1906	Willie Heston	Independent	—	—	3	1	4	—	N/A	N/A
1907	Mickey Whitehurst	Independent	—	—	6	0	1	—	N/A	N/A
1908	Mickey Whitehurst	Independent	—	—	6	1	0	—	N/A	N/A
1909	Edward L. Greene	Independent	—	—	6	1	0	—	N/A	N/A
1910	Edward L. Greene	Independent	—	—	4	0	2	—	N/A	N/A
1911	Edward L. Greene	Independent	—	—	5	3	0	—	N/A	N/A
1912	Edward L. Greene	Independent	—	—	4	3	0	—	N/A	N/A
1913	Edward L. Greene	Independent	—	—	6	1	0	—	N/A	N/A
1914	Jack Hegarty	Independent	—	—	2	3	1	—	N/A	N/A
1915	Jack Hegarty	Independent	—	—	3	3	1	—	N/A	N/A
1916	Brit Patterson	Independent	—	—	2	5	0	—	N/A	N/A
1917	Harry Hartsell	Independent	—	—	6	2	1	—	N/A	N/A
1918	Tal Stafford	Independent	—	—	1	3	0	—	N/A	N/A
1919	Bill Fetzer	Independent	—	—	7	2	0	—	N/A	N/A
1920	Bill Fetzer	Independent	—	—	7	3	0	—	N/A	N/A
1921	Harry Hartsell	Independent	—	—	3	3	3	—	N/A	N/A
1922	Harry Hartsell	Southern Conference	—	—	4	6	0	—	N/A	N/A
1923	Harry Hartsell	Southern Conference	—	—	3	7	0	—	N/A	N/A
1924	Buck Shaw	Southern Conference	—	—	2	6	2	—	N/A	N/A
1925	Gus Tebell	Southern Conference	—	—	3	5	1	—	N/A	N/A
1926	Gus Tebell	Southern Conference	—	—	4	6	0	—	N/A	N/A
1927	Gus Tebell	Southern Conference	—	—	9	1	0	—	N/A	N/A
1928	Gus Tebell	Southern Conference	—	—	4	5	1	—	N/A	N/A
1929	Gus Tebell	Southern Conference	—	—	1	8	0	—	N/A	N/A
1930	John Van Liew	Southern Conference	—	—	2	8	0	—	N/A	N/A
1931	Clipper Smith	Southern Conference	—	—	3	6	0	—	N/A	N/A
1932	Clipper Smith	Southern Conference	—	—	6	1	2	—	N/A	N/A
1933	Clipper Smith	Southern Conference	10th	—	1	5	3	—	N/A	N/A
1934	Hunk Anderson	Southern Conference	8th	—	2	6	1	—	N/A	N/A
1935	Hunk Anderson	Southern Conference	6th	—	6	4	0	—	N/A	N/A
1936	Hunk Anderson	Southern Conference	10th	—	3	7	0	—	N/A	N/A
1937	Doc Newton	Southern Conference	T-5th	—	5	3	1	—	N/A	N/A
1938	Doc Newton	Southern Conference	7th	—	3	7	1	—	N/A	N/A
1939	Doc Newton	Southern Conference	9th	—	2	8	0	—	N/A	N/A
1940	Doc Newton	Southern Conference	11th	—	3	6	0	—	N/A	N/A
1941	Doc Newton	Southern Conference	8th	—	4	5	2	—	N/A	N/A
1942	Doc Newton	Southern Conference	6th	—	4	4	2	—	N/A	N/A
1943	Doc Newton	Southern Conference	9th	—	3	6	0	—	N/A	N/A
1944	Beattie Feathers	Southern Conference	T-3rd	—	7	2	0	—	N/A	N/A
1945	Beattie Feathers	Southern Conference	8th	—	3	6	0	—	N/A	N/A
1946	Beattie Feathers	Southern Conference	3rd	—	8	3	0	Lost 1947 Gator Bowl against Oklahoma Sooners, 13-34 ^	18th	N/A
1947	Beattie Feathers	Southern Conference	7th	—	5	3	1	—	17th	N/A
1948	Beattie Feathers	Southern Conference	14th	—	3	6	1	—	N/A	N/A
1949	Beattie Feathers	Southern Conference	13th	—	3	7	0	—	N/A	N/A
1950	Beattie Feathers	Southern Conference	9th	—	5	4	1	—	N/A	N/A
1951	Beattie Feathers	Southern Conference	12th	—	3	7	0	—	N/A	N/A
1952	Horace Hendrickson	Southern Conference	12th	—	3	7	0	—	N/A	N/A
1953	Horace Hendrickson	Atlantic Coast Conference	7th	—	1	9	0	—	N/A	N/A
1954	Earle Edwards	Atlantic Coast Conference	8th	—	2	8	0	—	N/A	N/A
1955	Earle Edwards	Atlantic Coast Conference	7th	—	4	5	1	—	N/A	N/A
1956	Earle Edwards	Atlantic Coast Conference	6th	—	3	7	0	—	N/A	N/A
1957 *	Earle Edwards	Atlantic Coast Conference	1st *	—	7	1	2	—	15th	20th
1958	Earle Edwards	Atlantic Coast Conference	7th	—	2	7	1	—	N/A	N/A
1959	Earle Edwards	Atlantic Coast Conference	8th	—	1	9	0	—	N/A	N/A
1960	Earle Edwards	Atlantic Coast Conference	2nd	—	6	3	1	—	N/A	N/A
1961	Earle Edwards	Atlantic Coast Conference	5th	—	4	6	0	—	N/A	N/A
1962	Earle Edwards	Atlantic Coast Conference	T-4th	—	3	6	1	—	N/A	N/A
1963 *	Earle Edwards	Atlantic Coast Conference	T–1st *	—	8	3	0	Lost 1963 Liberty Bowl against Mississippi State Bulldogs, 12-16 ^	N/A	N/A
1964 *	Earle Edwards	Atlantic Coast Conference	1st *	—	5	5	0	—	N/A	N/A
1965 *	Earle Edwards	Atlantic Coast Conference	T-1st *	—	6	4	0	—	N/A	N/A
1966	Earle Edwards	Atlantic Coast Conference	2nd	—	5	5	0	—	N/A	N/A
1967	Earle Edwards	Atlantic Coast Conference	2nd	—	9	2	0	Won 1967 Liberty Bowl against Georgia Bulldogs, 14-7 ^	N/A	17th
1968 *	Earle Edwards	Atlantic Coast Conference	T-1st *	—	6	4	0	—	N/A	N/A
1969	Earle Edwards	Atlantic Coast Conference	2nd	—	3	6	1	—	N/A	N/A
1970	Earle Edwards	Atlantic Coast Conference	5th	—	3	7	1	—	N/A	N/A
1971	Al Michaels	Atlantic Coast Conference	6th	—	3	8	0	—	N/A	N/A
1972	Lou Holtz	Atlantic Coast Conference	2nd	—	8	3	1	Won 1972 Peach Bowl against West Virginia Mountaineers, 49-13 ^	17th	N/A
1973 *	Lou Holtz	Atlantic Coast Conference	T-1st *	—	9	3	0	Won 1973 Liberty Bowl against Kansas Jayhawks, 31-18 ^	16th	N/A
1974	Lou Holtz	Atlantic Coast Conference	T-2nd	—	9	2	1	Tied 1974 Bluebonnet Bowl against Houston Cougars, 31-31 ^	11th	9th
1975	Lou Holtz	Atlantic Coast Conference	T-3rd	—	7	4	1	Lost 1975 Peach Bowl against West Virginia Mountaineers, 10-13 ^	N/A	N/A
1976	Bo Rein	Atlantic Coast Conference	5th	—	3	7	1	—	N/A	N/A
1977	Bo Rein	Atlantic Coast Conference	T-3rd	—	8	4	0	Won 1977 Peach Bowl against Iowa State Cyclones, 24-14 ^	N/A	T-19th
1978	Bo Rein	Atlantic Coast Conference	3rd	—	9	3	0	Won 1978 Tangerine Bowl against Pittsburgh Panthers, 30-17 ^	18th	T-19th
1979 *	Bo Rein	Atlantic Coast Conference	1st *	—	7	4	0	—	N/A	N/A
1980	Monte Kiffin	Atlantic Coast Conference	3rd	—	6	5	0	—	N/A	N/A
1981	Monte Kiffin	Atlantic Coast Conference	5th	—	4	7	0	—	N/A	N/A
1982	Monte Kiffin	Atlantic Coast Conference	T-3rd	—	6	5	0	—	N/A	N/A
1983	Tom Reed	Atlantic Coast Conference	T-6th	—	3	8	0	—	N/A	N/A
1984	Tom Reed	Atlantic Coast Conference	T-6th	—	3	8	0	—	N/A	N/A
1985	Tom Reed	Atlantic Coast Conference	T-6th	—	3	8	0	—	N/A	N/A
1986	Dick Sheridan	Atlantic Coast Conference	T-2nd	—	8	3	1	Lost 1986 Peach Bowl against Virginia Tech Hokies, 24-25 ^	N/A	N/A
1987	Dick Sheridan	Atlantic Coast Conference	T-3rd	—	4	7	0	—	N/A	N/A
1988	Dick Sheridan	Atlantic Coast Conference	T-2nd	—	8	3	1	Won 1988 Peach Bowl against Iowa Hawkeyes, 28-23 ^	N/A	17th
1989	Dick Sheridan	Atlantic Coast Conference	T-4th	—	7	5	0	Lost 1989 Copper Bowl against Arizona Wildcats, 10-17 ^	N/A	N/A
1990	Dick Sheridan	Atlantic Coast Conference	6th	—	7	5	0	Won 1990 All-American Bowl against Southern Miss Golden Eagles, 31-27 ^	N/A	N/A
1991	Dick Sheridan	Atlantic Coast Conference	T-2nd	—	9	3	0	Lost 1991 Peach Bowl against East Carolina Pirates, 34-37 ^	24th	25th
1992	Dick Sheridan	Atlantic Coast Conference	2nd	—	9	3	1	Lost 1992 Gator Bowl against Florida Gators, 10-27 ^	17th	15th
1993	Mike O'Cain	Atlantic Coast Conference	5th	—	7	5	0	Lost 1994 Hall of Fame Bowl against Michigan Wolverines, 7-42 ^	N/A	N/A
1994	Mike O'Cain	Atlantic Coast Conference	2nd	—	9	3	0	Won 1995 Peach Bowl against Mississippi State Bulldogs, 28-24 ^	17th	17th
1995	Mike O'Cain	Atlantic Coast Conference	7th	—	3	8	0	—	N/A	N/A
1996	Mike O'Cain	Atlantic Coast Conference	T-6th	—	3	8	0	—	N/A	N/A
1997	Mike O'Cain	Atlantic Coast Conference	T6th	—	6	5	0	—	N/A	N/A
1998	Mike O'Cain	Atlantic Coast Conference	4th	—	7	5	0	Lost 1998 MicronPC Bowl against Miami Hurricanes, 23-46 ^	N/A	N/A
1999	Mike O'Cain	Atlantic Coast Conference	5th	—	6	6	0	—	N/A	N/A
2000	Chuck Amato	Atlantic Coast Conference	5th	—	8	4	0	Won 2000 MicronPC.com Bowl against Minnesota Golden Gophers, 38-30 ^	N/A	N/A
2001	Chuck Amato	Atlantic Coast Conference	4th	—	7	5	0	Lost 2001 Tangerine Bowl against Pittsburgh Panthers, 19-34 ^	N/A	N/A
2002	Chuck Amato	Atlantic Coast Conference	4th	—	11	3	0	Won 2003 Gator Bowl against Notre Dame Fighting Irish, 28-6 ^	12th	11th
2003	Chuck Amato	Atlantic Coast Conference	4th	—	8	5	0	Won 2003 Tangerine Bowl against Kansas Jayhawks, 56-26 ^	N/A	N/A
2004	Chuck Amato	Atlantic Coast Conference	T-8th	—	5	6	0	—	N/A	N/A
2005	Chuck Amato	Atlantic Coast Conference	—	4th	7	5	0	Won 2005 Meineke Car Care Bowl against South Florida Bulls, 14-0 ^	N/A	N/A
2006	Chuck Amato	Atlantic Coast Conference	—	6th	3	9	0	—	N/A	N/A
2007	Tom O'Brien	Atlantic Coast Conference	—	T-5th	5	7	0	—	N/A	N/A
2008	Tom O'Brien	Atlantic Coast Conference	—	T-3rd	6	7	0	Lost 2008 PapaJohns.com Bowl against Rutgers Scarlet Knights, 23-29 ^	N/A	N/A
2009	Tom O'Brien	Atlantic Coast Conference	—	T-5th	5	7	0	—	N/A	N/A
2010	Tom O'Brien	Atlantic Coast Conference	—	2nd	9	4	0	Won 2010 Champs Sports Bowl against West Virginia Mountaineers, 23-7 ^	25th	N/A
2011	Tom O'Brien	Atlantic Coast Conference	—	4th	8	5	0	Won 2011 Belk Bowl against Louisville Cardinals, 31-24 ^	N/A	N/A
2012	Tom O'Brien	Atlantic Coast Conference	—	3rd	7	6	0	Lost 2012 Music City Bowl against Vanderbilt Commodores, 24-38 ^	N/A	N/A
2013	Dave Doeren	Atlantic Coast Conference	—	6th	3	9	0	—	N/A	N/A
2014	Dave Doeren	Atlantic Coast Conference	—	5th	8	5	0	Won 2014 St. Petersburg Bowl against Central Florida Knights, 34-27 ^	N/A	N/A
2015	Dave Doeren	Atlantic Coast Conference	—	4th	7	6	0	Lost 2015 Belk Bowl against Mississippi State Bulldogs, 28-51 ^	N/A	N/A
2016	Dave Doeren	Atlantic Coast Conference	—	4th	7	6	0	Won 2016 Independence Bowl against Vanderbilt Commodores, 41-17 ^	N/A	N/A
2017	Dave Doeren	Atlantic Coast Conference	—	2nd	9	4	0	Won 2017 Sun Bowl against Arizona State Sun Devils, 52-31 ^	23rd	23rd
2018	Dave Doeren	Atlantic Coast Conference	—	3rd	9	4	0	Lost 2018 Gator Bowl against Texas A&M Aggies, 13-52 ^	N/A	N/A
2019	Dave Doeren	Atlantic Coast Conference	—	7th	4	8	0	—	N/A	N/A
2020	Dave Doeren	Atlantic Coast Conference	—	4th	8	4	0	Lost 2020 Gator Bowl against Kentucky Wildcats, 21-23 ^	N/A	N/A
2021	Dave Doeren	Atlantic Coast Conference	—	2nd	9	3	0	2021 Holiday Bowl against UCLA Bruins cancelled^	20th	19th
2022	Dave Doeren	Atlantic Coast Conference	—	T–3rd	8	5	0	Lost 2022 Duke's Mayo Bowl against Maryland Terrapins, 12–16 ^	N/A	N/A
2023	Dave Doeren	Atlantic Coast Conference	3rd	—	9	4	0	Lost 2023 Pop-Tarts Bowl against Kansas State Wildcats, 19–28 ^	21st	21st
2024	Dave Doeren	Atlantic Coast Conference	T–10th	—	6	7	0	Lost 2024 Military Bowl against East Carolina Pirates, 21–26 ^	N/A	N/A
2025	Dave Doeren	Atlantic Coast Conference	T-7th	—	8	5	0	Won 2025 Gasparilla Bowl against Memphis Tigers, 31–7 ^	N/A	N/A
Total					619	587	54	(only includes regular season games)		
Total					18	17	1	(only includes postseason games, 35 appearances)		
Total					636	604	55	(includes both regular season and postseason games)		
