= 2007 NC State Wolfpack football team =

American college football season

2007 NC State Wolfpack football
- Conference: Atlantic Coast Conference
- Atlantic Division
- Record: 5–7 (3–5 ACC)
- Head coach: Tom O'Brien (1st season)
- Offensive coordinator: Dana Bible (1st season)
- Offensive scheme: Pro-style
- Defensive coordinator: Mike Archer (1st season)
- Base defense: 4–3
- Home stadium: Carter–Finley Stadium

2007 Atlantic Coast Conference football standings
	Conf.			Overall
Team	W		L	W		L
Atlantic Division
No. 10 Boston College x	6	–	2	11	–	3
No. 21 Clemson	5	–	3	9	–	4
Wake Forest	5	–	3	9	–	4
Florida State	4	–	4	7	–	6
Maryland	3	–	5	6	–	7
NC State	3	–	5	5	–	7
Coastal Division
No. 9 Virginia Tech x$	7	–	1	11	–	3
Virginia	6	–	2	9	–	4
Georgia Tech	4	–	4	7	–	6
North Carolina	3	–	5	4	–	8
Miami (FL)	2	–	6	5	–	7
Duke	0	–	8	1	–	11
Championship: Virginia Tech 30, Boston College 16
$ – BCS representative as conference champion; % – BCS at-large representative; x – Division champion/co-champions; Rankings from AP Poll

The 2007 NC State Wolfpack football team represented North Carolina State University during the 2007 NCAA Division I FBS football season. The team's head coach was Tom O'Brien. NC State has been a member of the Atlantic Coast Conference (ACC) since the league's inception in 1953, and has participated in that conference's Atlantic Division since 2005. The Wolfpack played its home games in 2007 at Carter–Finley Stadium in Raleigh, North Carolina, which has been NC State football's home stadium since 1966.

== Schedule ==
Date	Time	Opponent	Site	TV	Result	Attendance	Source
September 1	6:00 pm	UCF*	Carter–Finley Stadium; Raleigh, NC	ESPN360	L 23–25	57,283	
September 8	2:30 pm	at No. 25 Boston College	Alumni Stadium; Chestnut Hill, MA	ESPN2	L 17–37	42,513	
September 15	6:00 pm	Wofford*	Carter–Finley Stadium; Raleigh, NC	ESPN360	W 38–17	56,039	
September 22	12:00 pm	No. 14 Clemson	Carter–Finley Stadium; Raleigh, NC (Textile Bowl)	LFS	L 20–42	56,903	
September 29	3:30 pm	Louisville*	Carter–Finley Stadium; Raleigh, NC	ESPNU	L 10–29	56,487	
October 6	3:30 pm	at Florida State	Doak Campbell Stadium; Tallahassee, FL	ABC	L 10–27	82,214	
October 20	4:30 pm	at East Carolina*	Dowdy–Ficklen Stadium; Greenville, NC (Victory Barrel)	CSTV	W 34–20	43,527	
October 27	4:30 pm	No. 21 Virginia^{†}	Carter–Finley Stadium; Raleigh, NC	ESPNU	W 29–24	55,342	
November 3	12:00 pm	at Miami	Miami Orange Bowl; Miami, FL	ESPNU	W 19–16 ^{OT}	34,621	
November 10	12:00 pm	North Carolina	Carter–Finley Stadium; Raleigh, NC (rivalry)	LFS	W 31–27	57,583	
November 17	4:00 pm	at Wake Forest	BB&T Field; Winston-Salem, NC (rivalry)	ESPNU	L 18–38	33,052	
November 24	12:00 pm	Maryland	Carter–Finley Stadium; Raleigh, NC	LFS	L 0–37	54,856	
*Non-conference game; ^{†}Homecoming; Rankings from Coaches' Poll released prior to the game; All times are in Eastern time
