= 2009 NC State Wolfpack football team =

American college football season

2009 NC State Wolfpack football
- Conference: Atlantic Coast Conference
- Atlantic Division
- Record: 5–7 (2–6 ACC)
- Head coach: Tom O'Brien (3rd season)
- Offensive coordinator: Dana Bible (3rd season)
- Offensive scheme: Pro-style
- Defensive coordinator: Mike Archer (3rd season)
- Base defense: 4–3
- Home stadium: Carter–Finley Stadium

2009 Atlantic Coast Conference football standings
	Conf.			Overall
Team	W		L	W		L
Atlantic Division
No. 24 Clemson x	6	–	2	9	–	5
Boston College	5	–	3	8	–	5
Florida State	4	–	4	7	–	6
Wake Forest	3	–	5	5	–	7
NC State	2	–	6	5	–	7
Maryland	1	–	7	2	–	10
Coastal Division
No. 13 Georgia Tech * x$	7	–	1	11	–	3
No. 10 Virginia Tech	6	–	2	10	–	3
No. 19 Miami (FL)	5	–	3	9	–	4
North Carolina *	0	–	4	0	–	5
Duke	3	–	5	5	–	7
Virginia	2	–	6	3	–	9
Championship: Georgia Tech 39, Clemson 34
$ – BCS representative as conference champion; North Carolina vacated 8 wins, including 4 ACC wins.; Rankings from AP Poll

The 2009 NC State Wolfpack football team represented North Carolina State University in the 2009 NCAA Division I FBS football season. The team's head coach was Tom O'Brien. It was O'Brien's third season as NC State's head coach. The Wolfpack played their home games at Carter–Finley Stadium in Raleigh, North Carolina. The Wolfpack finished the season 5–7, 2–6 in ACC play and failed to qualify for a bowl game.

== Preseason ==
On June 27, linebacker Nate Irving was seriously injured in an automobile accident and will not play for the 2009 season, as he suffered a compound fracture in his leg and a collapsed lung.

== Schedule ==
Date	Time	Opponent	Site	TV	Result	Attendance	Source
September 3	7:00 pm	South Carolina*	Carter–Finley Stadium; Raleigh, NC	ESPN	L 3–7	57,583	
September 12	6:00 pm	Murray State*	Carter–Finley Stadium; Raleigh, NC		W 65–7	55,510	
September 19	6:00 pm	Gardner–Webb*	Carter–Finley Stadium; Raleigh, NC		W 45–14	53,452	
September 26	3:30 pm	Pittsburgh*	Carter–Finley Stadium; Raleigh, NC	ESPNU	W 38–31	57,583	
October 3	3:30 pm	at Wake Forest	BB&T Field; Winston-Salem, NC (rivalry)	ESPNU	L 24–30	33,921	
October 10	4:00 pm	Duke	Carter–Finley Stadium; Raleigh, NC (rivalry)	ESPNU	L 28–49	56,452	
October 17	3:30 pm	at Boston College	Alumni Stadium; Chestnut Hill, MA	ABC	L 20–52	35,261	
October 31	12:00 pm	at Florida State	Doak Campbell Stadium; Tallahassee, FL	Raycom	L 42–45	67,712	
November 7	1:00 pm	Maryland	Carter–Finley Stadium; Raleigh, NC	ESPN360	W 38–31	55,631	
November 14	12:00 pm	Clemson	Carter–Finley Stadium; Raleigh, NC (Textile Bowl)	Raycom	L 23–43	57,583	
November 21	3:30 pm	at No. 16 Virginia Tech	Lane Stadium; Blacksburg, VA	ESPNU	L 10–38	66,233	
November 28	12:00 pm	North Carolina	Carter–Finley Stadium; Raleigh, NC (rivalry)	ESPN2	W 28–27	57,583	
*Non-conference game; Rankings from Coaches' Poll released prior to the game; All times are in Eastern time

== Coaching staff ==
After not traveling with the team to Blacksburg, Virginia for the Virginia Tech game, it was announced that offensive coordinator Dana Bible had been diagnosed with leukemia.
