= Deraney =

Deraney is a surname. Notable people with the surname include:

- Bob Deraney (born 1966), American ice hockey coach
- John Deraney (born 1983), American football punter

== See also ==
- Delaney (disambiguation)
