= Jaylen Samuels =

American gridiron football player (born 1996)

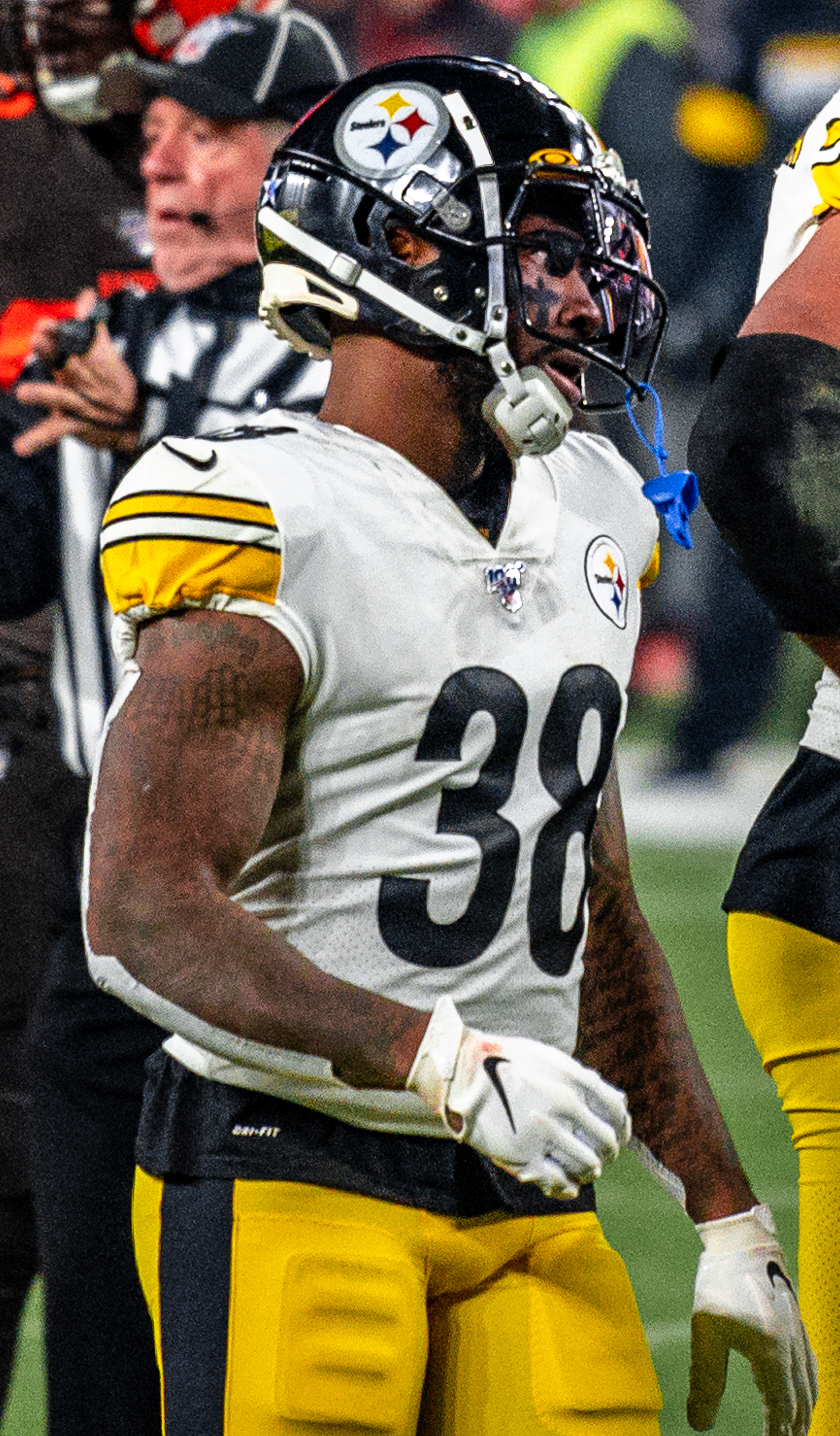
- Samuels with the Pittsburgh Steelers in 2019

Profile
- Position: Running back

Personal information
- Born: July 20, 1996 (age 30); Charlotte, North Carolina, U.S.
- Listed height: 5 ft 11 in (1.80 m)
- Listed weight: 229 lb (104 kg)

Career information
- High school: Mallard Creek (Charlotte)
- College: NC State (2014–2017)
- NFL draft: 2018: 5th round, 165th overall pick

Career history
- Pittsburgh Steelers (2018–2021); Houston Texans (2021); Arizona Cardinals (2022)*; San Antonio Brahmas (2024)*; Ottawa Redblacks (2025)*
- * Offseason or practice squad member only

Awards and highlights
- 2× First-team All-ACC (2015, 2017)

Career NFL statistics
- Rushing yards: 468
- Rushing average: 3.4
- Rushing touchdowns: 1
- Receptions: 85
- Receiving yards: 564
- Receiving touchdowns: 4
- Stats at Pro Football Reference
- Stats at CFL.ca

Jaylen Samuels (born July 20, 1996) is an American professional football running back. He was most recently a member of the Ottawa Redblacks of the Canadian Football League (CFL). He played college football for the NC State Wolfpack.

== Early life ==
Samuels attended and played high school football at Mallard Creek High School. While there, he played at the safety and running back positions. He also helped lead Mallard Creek to the 2013 North Carolina 4AA state title, with a perfect 16–0 record.

== College career ==
Throughout his college career at North Carolina State, Samuels changed positions, being listed as a running back, fullback, wide receiver and tight end. Best described as a more traditional slotback or H-back. He scored a touchdown in the 2014 St. Petersburg Bowl. After his junior season, Samuels was able to participate in the 2016 Independence Bowl against Vanderbilt, where he caught three touchdown passes, the most in Independence Bowl history. Due to his contribution, he was named the MVP of the Independence Bowl. During his senior season, Samuels set the NC State record for career receptions with 201 during his four years. After this season, Samuels was invited to the 2018 Senior Bowl. Following his senior season, he was honored as First Team All-Atlantic Coast Conference as an "All-Purpose" player as well as Third Team Associated Press All-American as a tight end. He finished his college career with 1,851 receiving yards, 1,107 rushing yards, and 47 total touchdowns.

=== College statistics ===
Year	School	Conf	Class	Pos	G	Receiving				Rushing			
Year	School	Conf	Class	Pos	G	Rec	Yds	Avg	TD	Att	Yds	Avg	TD
2014	NC State	ACC	FR	TE	11	6	96	16.0	1	15	143	9.5	1
2015	NC State	ACC	SO	TE	13	65	597	9.2	7	56	368	6.6	9
2016	NC State	ACC	JR	TE	13	55	565	10.3	7	33	189	5.7	6
2017	NC State	ACC	SR	TE	13	75	593	7.9	4	78	407	5.2	12
Career	NC State				50	201	1,851	9.2	19	182	1,107	6.1	28

== Professional career ==
Pre-draft measurables
Height	Weight	Arm length	Hand span	40-yard dash	10-yard split	20-yard split	20-yard shuttle	Three-cone drill	Vertical jump	Broad jump	Bench press
5 ft 11 1/2 in (1.82 m)	225 lb (102 kg)	31 3/8 in (0.80 m)	9 1/4 in (0.23 m)	4.54 s	1.63 s	2.68 s	4.28 s	6.93 s	34 1/2 in (0.88 m)	10 ft 1 in (3.07 m)	18 reps
All values from NFL Combine

=== Pittsburgh Steelers ===
==== 2018 ====
The Pittsburgh Steelers selected Samuels in the fifth round with the 165th overall pick in the 2018 NFL draft. Samuels was the 14th running back drafted in 2018. On May 9, 2018, the Steelers signed Samuels to a four-year, $2.71 million contract that includes a signing bonus of $258,066.

Due to a Week 13 injury to starter James Conner, Samuels earned his first career NFL start in Week 14 against the Oakland Raiders. In the game, Samuels rushed for 28 yards on 11 attempts and caught seven passes for 64 yards in a 24–21 loss. The following week against the New England Patriots, Samuels rushed 19 times for 142 yards and caught two passes for 30 yards in a 17–10 win. His 142 rushing yards marked the second most by a rookie in Steelers history, behind only Bam Morris, who rushed for 146 yards against the New York Giants in 1994. He finished the 2018 season with 56 carries for 256 rushing yards to go along with 26 receptions for 199 receiving yards and three receiving touchdowns in 14 games.

==== 2019 ====
In Week 4 against the Cincinnati Bengals, Samuels completed three passes for 31 yards, rushed 10 times for 26 yards and a touchdown, and caught eight passes for 57 yards in the 27–3 win. After missing two games due to a knee injury, Samuels returned to action in Week 9 against the Indianapolis Colts. In the game, Samuels rushed eight times for 10 yards and recorded 13 catches for 73 yards in the 26–24 win. Samuels's 13 catches in the game was a franchise record for catches by a running back in a game, surpassing LeVeon Bell's 12 catches in a game in 2017. Overall, Samuels finished the 2019 season with 175 rushing yards and one rushing touchdown to go along with 47 receptions for 305 receiving yards and one receiving touchdown.

==== 2020 ====
Samuels was placed on the reserve/COVID-19 list by the Steelers on August 2, 2020. He was activated from the list on August 13. He was placed on the reserve/COVID-19 list again on November 10, and activated again four days later. He appeared in 14 games and started one in the 2020 season.

==== 2021 ====
On August 31, 2021, Samuels was waived by the Steelers as part of final roster cuts and re-signed to the practice squad the next day. He was released on October 27.

=== Houston Texans ===
On October 29, 2021, Samuels was signed to the Houston Texans practice squad. Samuels finished the 2021 season with appearances in three games.

=== Arizona Cardinals ===
On January 19, 2022, Samuels signed a reserve/future contract with the Arizona Cardinals. He was released by the Cardinals on May 31.

=== Houston Roughnecks ===
On December 8, 2023, Samuels signed with the Houston Roughnecks of the XFL. The Roughnecks brand was transferred to the Houston Gamblers when the XFL and United States Football League merged to create the United Football League (UFL).

=== San Antonio Brahmas ===
On January 5, 2024, Samuels was drafted by the San Antonio Brahmas during the 2024 UFL dispersal draft. He was released by the Brahmas on March 10.

=== Ottawa Redblacks ===
On May 1, 2025, it was announced that Samuels had been signed by the Ottawa Redblacks of the Canadian Football League. However, he was part of the final training camp cuts on May 31.
