= Jarvis Williams =

Jarvis Williams may refer to:

- Jarvis Williams (basketball) (born 1993), American basketball player
- Jarvis Williams (entrepreneur), part owner of Hinkley, Williams and Company in the late 19th century, see Hinkley Locomotive Works
- Jarvis Williams (defensive back) (1965–2010), American football player
- Jarvis Williams (wide receiver) (born 1987), American football player
