= Lou Groza Award =

College football award in the US

- The Lou Groza Award logo
- Awarded for: the top college football placekicker in the United States
- Location: Palm Beach County, Florida
- Country: United States
- Presented by: Palm Beach County Sports Commission

History
- First award: 1992
- Most recent: Tate Sandell, Oklahoma (2025)
- Website: lougrozaaward.com

The Lou Groza Award is presented annually to the top college football placekicker in the United States by the Palm Beach County Sports Commission. The award is named after former Ohio State Buckeyes and Cleveland Browns player Lou Groza. It has been presented since 1992, with Joe Allison of Memphis State receiving the inaugural award. The incumbent award holder is Tate Sandell of the University of Oklahoma. The award is part of the National College Football Awards Association coalition.

== Winners ==
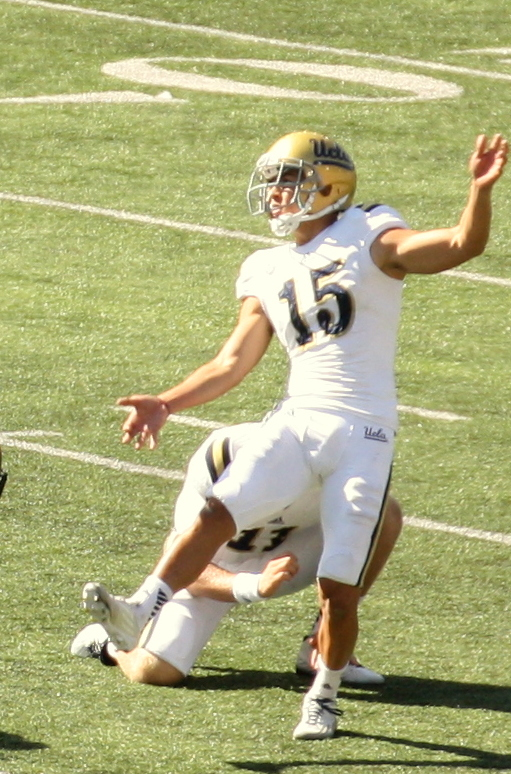
2015 winner Kaʻimi Fairbairn of UCLA

Year	Winner	School	Ref.
1992	Joe Allison	Memphis State	
1993	Judd Davis	Florida	
1994	Steve McLaughlin	Arizona	
1995	Michael Reeder	TCU	
1996	Marc Primanti	NC State	
1997	Martín Gramática	Kansas State	
1998	Sebastian Janikowski (2)	Florida State	
1999	Sebastian Janikowski (2)	Florida State (2)	
2000	Jonathan Ruffin	Cincinnati	
2001	Seth Marler	Tulane	
2002	Nate Kaeding	Iowa	
2003	Jonathan Nichols	Ole Miss	
2004	Mike Nugent	Ohio State	
2005	Alexis Serna	Oregon State	
2006	Art Carmody	Louisville	
2007	Thomas Weber	Arizona State	
2008	Graham Gano	Florida State (3)	
2009	Kai Forbath	UCLA	
2010	Dan Bailey	Oklahoma State	
2011	Randy Bullock	Texas A&M	
2012	Cairo Santos	Tulane (2)	
2013	Roberto Aguayo	Florida State (4)	
2014	Brad Craddock	Maryland	
2015	Kaʻimi Fairbairn	UCLA (2)	
2016	Zane Gonzalez	Arizona State (2)	
2017	Matt Gay	Utah	
2018	Andre Szmyt	Syracuse	
2019	Rodrigo Blankenship	Georgia	
2020	José Borregales	Miami (FL)	
2021	Jake Moody	Michigan	
2022	Christopher Dunn	NC State (2)	
2023	Graham Nicholson	Miami (OH)	
2024	Kenneth Almendares	Louisiana	
2025	Tate Sandell	Oklahoma	
