= 1996 NC State Wolfpack football team =

American college football season

1996 NC State Wolfpack football
- Conference: Atlantic Coast Conference
- Record: 3–8 (3–5 ACC)
- Head coach: Mike O'Cain (4th season)
- Offensive coordinator: Ted Cain (11th season)
- Co-defensive coordinators: Ken Pettus (3rd season); Kent Briggs (1st season)
- Home stadium: Carter–Finley Stadium

1996 Atlantic Coast Conference football standings
	Conf.			Overall
Team	W		L	W		L
No. 3 Florida State $	8	–	0	11	–	1
No. 10 North Carolina	6	–	2	10	–	2
Clemson	6	–	2	7	–	5
Virginia	5	–	3	7	–	5
Georgia Tech	4	–	4	5	–	6
Maryland	3	–	5	5	–	6
NC State	3	–	5	3	–	8
Wake Forest	1	–	7	3	–	8
Duke	0	–	8	0	–	11
$ – Conference champion; Rankings from AP Poll

The 1996 NC State Wolfpack football team represented North Carolina State University during the 1996 NCAA Division I-A football season. The team's head coach was Mike O'Cain. NC State has been a member of the Atlantic Coast Conference (ACC) since the league's inception in 1953. The Wolfpack played its home games in 1996 at Carter–Finley Stadium in Raleigh, North Carolina, which has been NC State football's home stadium since 1966.

== Schedule ==
Date	Time	Opponent	Site	TV	Result	Attendance	Source
September 7	12:00 pm	Georgia Tech	Carter–Finley Stadium; Raleigh, NC	ABC	L 16–28	41,500	
September 19	8:00 pm	No. 3 Florida State	Carter–Finley Stadium; Raleigh, NC	ESPN	L 17–51	45,700	
September 28	12:00 pm	at Purdue*	Ross–Ade Stadium; West Lafayette, IN	ESPN Plus	L 21–42	39,739	
October 5	12:00 pm	at Maryland	Byrd Stadium; College Park, MD	JPS	W 34–8	32,550	
October 12	3:30 pm	No. 8 Alabama*	Carter–Finley Stadium; Raleigh, NC	ABC	L 19–24	50,750	
October 19	12:00 pm	at Virginia	Scott Stadium; Charlottesville, VA	JPS	L 14–62	40,300	
November 2	12:00 pm	at No. 8 North Carolina	Kenan Memorial Stadium; Chapel Hill, NC (rivalry)	JPS	L 20–52	47,000	
November 9	12:00 pm	Duke	Carter–Finley Stadium; Raleigh, NC (rivalry)	JPS	W 44–22	47,200	
November 16	12:00 pm	at Clemson	Memorial Stadium; Clemson, SC (Textile Bowl)	JPS	L 17–40	63,796	
November 23	1:00 pm	Wake Forest	Carter–Finley Stadium; Raleigh, NC (rivalry)		W 37–22	40,500	
November 30	3:30 pm	vs. East Carolina*	Ericsson Stadium; Charlotte, NC (rivalry)	ESPN2	L 29–50	66,347	
*Non-conference game; Rankings from AP Poll released prior to the game; All times are in Eastern time

== Roster ==
1996 NC State Wolfpack football team roster
Players
Coaches
Offense

Pos.	#	Name	Class
QB	4	Jamie Barnette	Fr
QB	6	Charles Berry	Fr
G	65	Lonnie Gilbert	Jr
WR	83	Jimmy Grissette	Sr
C	72	Jason Groff	Jr
WR	13	Ryan Hamrick	Fr
QB	10	Colin Harris	Jr
WR	81	Torry Holt	So
TE	24	Mark Thomas	Jr
WR	80	Alvis Whitted	Jr
OL	78	Jermaine Wilkinson	Fr

Defense

Pos.	#	Name	Class
DB	11	Tony Scott	Fr
CB	7	Hassan Shamsid-Deen	So
DE	45	Clayton Simon	So

Special teams

Pos.	#	Name	Class
PK	10	Marc Primanti	Sr

Head coach

- Mike O'Cain

Coordinators/assistant coaches

Legend

- (C) Team captain
- (S) Suspended
- (I) Ineligible
- Injured
- Redshirt

Roster
Last update: 1996-12-25
