= 2016 NC State Wolfpack football team =

American college football season

2016 NC State Wolfpack football

Independence Bowl champion

Independence Bowl, W 41–17 vs. Vanderbilt
- Conference: Atlantic Coast Conference
- Atlantic Division
- Record: 7–6 (3–5 ACC)
- Head coach: Dave Doeren (4th season)
- Offensive coordinator: Eliah Drinkwitz (1st season)
- Offensive scheme: Multiple
- Defensive coordinator: Dave Huxtable (4th season)
- Base defense: 4–3
- Home stadium: Carter–Finley Stadium

2016 Atlantic Coast Conference football standings
	Conf.			Overall
Team	W		L	W		L
Atlantic Division
No. 1 Clemson xy$#	7	–	1	14	–	1
No. 21 Louisville x	7	–	1	9	–	4
No. 8 Florida State	5	–	3	10	–	3
NC State	3	–	5	7	–	6
Wake Forest	3	–	5	7	–	6
Boston College	2	–	6	7	–	6
Syracuse	2	–	6	4	–	8
Coastal Division
No. 16 Virginia Tech xy	6	–	2	10	–	4
North Carolina	5	–	3	8	–	5
No. 20 Miami (FL)	5	–	3	9	–	4
Pittsburgh	5	–	3	8	–	5
Georgia Tech	4	–	4	9	–	4
Duke	1	–	7	4	–	8
Virginia	1	–	7	2	–	10
Championship: Clemson 42, Virginia Tech 35
# – College Football Playoff champion; $ – Conference champion; x – Division champion/co-champions; y – Championship game participant; Rankings from AP Poll

The 2016 NC State Wolfpack football team represented North Carolina State University in the 2016 NCAA Division I FBS football season. They played their home games at Carter–Finley Stadium in Raleigh, North Carolina. It was their fourth season under head coach Dave Doeren. They were a member of the Atlantic Division of the Atlantic Coast Conference.

== Schedule ==
Date	Time	Opponent	Site	TV	Result	Attendance
September 1	7:30 pm	No. 9 (FCS) William & Mary*	Carter–Finley Stadium; Raleigh, NC	ACCN+	W 48–14	57,774
September 10	12:00 pm	at East Carolina*	Dowdy–Ficklen Stadium; Greenville, NC (Victory Barrel)	ESPNU	L 30–33	50,719
September 17	6:00 pm	Old Dominion*	Carter–Finley Stadium; Raleigh, NC	ACCN+	W 49–22	57,810
October 1	3:30 pm	Wake Forest	Carter–Finley Stadium; Raleigh, NC (rivalry)	ACCRSN	W 33–16	58,200
October 8	12:00 pm	Notre Dame*	Carter–Finley Stadium; Raleigh, NC	ABC	W 10–3	58,200
October 15	12:00 pm	at No. 3 Clemson	Memorial Stadium; Clemson, SC (Textile Bowl)	ABC	L 17–24 ^{OT}	81,200
October 22	12:00 pm	at No. 7 Louisville	Papa John's Cardinal Stadium; Louisville, KY	ABC	L 13–54	55,218
October 29	12:30 pm	Boston College^{†}	Carter–Finley Stadium; Raleigh, NC	ACCN	L 14–21	56,443
November 5	7:00 pm	No. 19 Florida State	Carter–Finley Stadium; Raleigh, NC	ESPNU	L 20–24	57,789
November 12	12:30 pm	at Syracuse	Carrier Dome; Syracuse, NY	ACCN	W 35–20	34,842
November 19	12:30 pm	Miami (FL)	Carter–Finley Stadium; Raleigh, NC	ACCN	L 13–27	56,263
November 25	12:00 pm	at North Carolina	Kenan Memorial Stadium; Chapel Hill, NC (rivalry)	ESPN	W 28–21	59,000
December 26	4:00 p.m.	vs. Vanderbilt*	Independence Stadium; Shreveport, Louisiana (Independence Bowl)	ESPN2	W 41–17	28,995
*Non-conference game; ^{†}Homecoming; Rankings from AP Poll released prior to the game; All times are in Eastern time

== Game summaries ==
=== William & Mary ===
	1	2	3	4	Total
#9 (FCS) Tribe	7	0	7	0	14
Wolfpack	7	21	7	13	48

=== At East Carolina ===
	1	2	3	4	Total
Wolfpack	0	20	3	7	30
Pirates	9	10	7	7	33

=== Old Dominion ===
	1	2	3	4	Total
Monarchs	0	3	6	13	22
Wolfpack	7	14	14	14	49

=== Wake Forest ===
	1	2	3	4	Total
Demon Deacons	0	9	7	0	16
Wolfpack	17	6	3	7	33

=== Notre Dame ===
Notre Dame at North Carolina State

Team	1	2	3	4	Total
Fighting Irish	0	0	3	0	3
• Wolfpack	3	0	0	7	10

- Date: October 8, 2016
- Location: Carter–Finley Stadium
  Raleigh, NC
- Game start: 12:00 p.m. EDT
- Elapsed time: 4 hours
- Game attendance: 58,200
- Game weather: Temperature: 69 °F (21 °C) • Weather: Hurricane Matthew • Wind: NE 18 MPH
- Referee: Jeff Heaser
- TV announcers (ABC): Greg McElroy, Dave Pasch and Tom Luginbill (sideline)

The Notre Dame vs NC State game was played during Hurricane Matthew where the two teams combined for only 311 total yards. The only touchdown of the game was scored by NC State on a blocked punt by Pharaoh Mckever leading NC State to win it 10-3.

=== At Clemson ===
	1	2	3	4	OT	Total
Wolfpack	0	3	7	7	0	17
#3 Tigers	3	7	7	0	7	24

=== At Louisville ===
	1	2	3	4	Total
Wolfpack	0	0	13	0	13
#7 Cardinals	17	27	0	10	54

=== Boston College ===
	1	2	3	4	Total
Eagles	0	10	3	8	21
Wolfpack	0	7	7	0	14

=== Florida State ===
	1	2	3	4	Total
#19 Seminoles	0	10	7	7	24
Wolfpack	7	6	7	0	20

=== At Syracuse ===
	1	2	3	4	Total
Wolfpack	0	14	14	7	35
Orange	7	3	10	0	20

=== Miami (FL) ===
	1	2	3	4	Total
Hurricanes	3	0	14	10	27
Wolfpack	0	3	7	3	13

=== At North Carolina ===
	1	2	3	4	Total
Wolfpack	14	7	7	0	28
Tar Heels	0	7	0	14	21

=== Vanderbilt–Independence Bowl ===
	1	2	3	4	Total
Wolfpack	0	14	14	13	41
Commodores	3	0	7	7	17

== Coaching staff ==
Name	Title
Dave Doeren	Head coach
Eliah Drinkwitz	Offensive coordinator/quarterbacks
Dave Huxtable	Defensive coordinator/linebackers
George Barlow	Assistant head coach/Cornerbacks
Eddie Faulkner	Special teams coordinator/tight ends/fullbacks
Clayton White	Safeties/co special teams coordinator
Desmond Kitchings	Assistant head coach/running backs/recruiting coordinator
Dwayne Ledford	Run Game coordinator/offensive line
George McDonald	Passing Game coordinator/wide receivers
Ryan Nielsen	Defensive line/run game coordinator defense
