= 2010 Champs Sports Bowl =

American college football game

West Virginia Mountaineers	NC State Wolfpack
(9–3)	(8–4)
Big East	ACC
7	23
Head coach: Bill Stewart	Head coach: Tom O'Brien
AP / Coaches / BCS; 22 / 21 / 22
	1	2	3	4	Total
West Virginia	0	7	0	0	7
NC State	7	3	6	7	23
- Date: December 28, 2010
- Season: 2010
- Stadium: Florida Citrus Bowl
- Location: Orlando, Florida
- MVP: QB Russell Wilson, NC State
- Favorite: W. Virginia by 3
- Referee: John O'Neill (Big Ten)
- Attendance: 48,962
- Payout: US$2.125 million per team

United States TV coverage
- Network: ESPN
- Announcers: Joe Tessitore, Rod Gilmore and Rob Stone
- Nielsen ratings: TBD

The 2010 Champs Sports Bowl was a college football bowl game that was played on December 28, 2010. The game matched up the West Virginia Mountaineers from the Big East Conference versus the NC State Wolfpack from the Atlantic Coast Conference. The game was scheduled for a 6:30 p.m. ET kickoff at Florida Citrus Bowl Stadium in Orlando, Florida.

== Background ==
West Virginia entered the game with a 9-3 record along with being co-champions of the Big East Conference. The Mountaineers were hurt in their quest for the Big East's BCS bid with October losses to UConn and Syracuse. WVU's strength was in their defense, which ranked 2nd nationally in points allowed and 3rd in yards allowed. The Mountaineers have appeared in eight straight bowl games and were defeated in last year's Gator Bowl by Florida State 33-21. West Virginia has played in the bowl on two previous occasions, in 1995 and 1997, when it was known as the Carquest Bowl and was played in Miami.

NC State entered the bowl with an overall record of 8-4. The Wolfpack attempted to win a bowl game for the first time in coach Tom O’Brien’s four seasons in Raleigh. NC State played in the Papajohns.com Bowl in his second season but lost to Rutgers, 29-23. The strength of the Wolfpack was in their passing game, ranked number 19 in the country. NC State has appeared in the bowl three previous times, first in 1998 when the game was known as the MicornPC Bowl and was played in Miami, Florida, and then in 2001 and 2003 when it was played in Orlando but was called the Tangerine Bowl.

The two schools have played each other nine times previously, with WVU holding a 5-4 advantage, though they have not played since 1979. This was the third time that they have played in a bowl game, having played in the 1972 and 1975 Peach Bowls. The bowl series between NC State and West Virginia is split, 1-1: the Wolfpack won the 1972 contest 49-13, and the Mountaineers won 13-10 in 1975.

== Game Summary ==
=== Scoring ===
Scoring Play	Score
1st Quarter
NCSU – Russell Wilson 16-yard pass to Mustafa Greene (Josh Czajkowski kick), 1:37	NCSU 7–0
2nd Quarter
WVU – Geno Smith 32-yard pass to Stedman Bailey (Tyler Bitancurt kick), 2:10	TIE 7–7
NCSU – Josh Czajkowski 45 yard kick, 0:26	NCSU 10–7
3rd Quarter
NCSU – Josh Czajkowski 38 yard kick, 6:05	NCSU 13–7
NCSU – Josh Czajkowski 40 yard kick, 1:50	NCSU 16–7
4th Quarter
NCSU – Russell Wilson 7-yard pass to Jarvis Williams (Josh Czajkowski kick), 3:55	NCSU 23–7

=== Statistics ===
Statistics	West Virginia	NC State
First downs	18	21
Total offense, plays-yards	64-324	81-377
Rushes-yards (net)	25-128	36-101
Passes, Comp-Att-Yds	22-39-196	28-45-276
Fumbles-Interceptions	4-1	0-0
Time of Possession	23:14	36:46
