= Dana Bible =

American football player and coach (born 1953)

Biographical details
- Born: October 30, 1953 (age 72); Erie, Pennsylvania, U.S.

Playing career
- 1973–1975: Cincinnati
- Position: Defensive back

Coaching career (HC unless noted)
- 1976–1977: Cincinnati (GA)
- 1978–1979: Cincinnati (QB)
- 1981: Miami (OH) (WR)
- 1983–1985: NC State (QB/WR)
- 1986–1988: San Diego State (OC/QB/WR)
- 1989: Miami (OH) (OC/QB)
- 1990–1992: Cincinnati Bengals (QB)
- 1994: Cincinnati (OC/QB)
- 1995–1997: Stanford (OC/QB)
- 1998: Philadelphia Eagles (OC)
- 1999–2006: Boston College (OC/QB/WR)
- 2007–2011: NC State (OC/QB/WR)
- 2012: NC State (OC/QB)
- 2012: NC State (interim HC)
- 2016: San Francisco 49ers (OA)
- 2018–2020: UCLA (QB)

Head coaching record
- Overall: 0–1

Dana John Bible (born October 30, 1953) is an American former football coach.

Bible graduated from St. Xavier High School in 1972 and the University of Cincinnati in 1976, where he earned a Bachelor of Arts in economics and in 1982 a Master of Business Administration in management. He has served in various college and National Football League (NFL) coaching positions. He was the offensive coordinator for the Philadelphia Eagles in 1998.

Bible was the quarterbacks and wide receivers coach at North Carolina State University from 1983 to 1985 and returned to NC State as offensive coordinator from 2007 to 2012 under head coach Tom O'Brien, having served as O'Brien's OC at Boston College from 1999 to 2006.

In 2009, Bible was diagnosed with acute promyelocytic leukemia. He retired from coaching on February 12, 2021.

== Head coaching record ==
| Year | Team | Overall | Conference | Standing | Bowl/playoffs |
|---|---|---|---|---|---|
NC State Wolfpack (Atlantic Coast Conference) (2012)
| 2012 | NC State | 0–1 (Note: Served as interim head coach after Tom O'Brien was fired at the end of the regular season.) | | | L Music City |
| NC State: | | 0–1 | | | |
| Total: | | 0–1 | | | |
