= Stan Fritts =

American football player (born 1952)

No. 33
- Position: Running back

Personal information
- Born: September 18, 1952 (age 74); Oak Ridge, Tennessee, U.S.
- Listed height: 6 ft 1 in (1.85 m)
- Listed weight: 215 lb (98 kg)

Career information
- High school: Oak Ridge
- College: NC State
- NFL draft: 1975: 4th round, 97th overall pick

Career history
- Cincinnati Bengals (1975–1976)

Awards and highlights
- Second-team All-American (1974); 2× First-team All-ACC (1972, 1974)

Career NFL statistics
- Games played: 26
- Rushing attempts–yards: 141–575
- Receptions–yards: 15–138
- Touchdowns: 13
- Stats at Pro Football Reference

Stanley Alan Fritts (born September 18, 1952) is an American former professional football player who was a running back for two seasons with the Cincinnati Bengals of the National Football League (NFL). He played college football for the NC State Wolfpack.

== Early life ==
Fritts attended Oak Ridge High School. He accepted a football scholarship from North Carolina State University.

As a sophomore in 1972, when Lou Holtz arrived as the new head coach at North Carolina State University, he implemented split-back veer offense to take advantage of the talent at running back, that included Fritts, Willie Burden, Charley Young and Roland Hooks. At the time, this was arguably the best group of running backs in the nation, they were known as "The Four Stallions" and everyone of them went on to play in a professional football league. He led the team with 145 carries for 689 yards (4.8-yard avg.) and 16 rushing touchdowns.

As a junior in 1973, he was part of the Atlantic Coast Conference championship team as a halfback. He was second on the team behind Burden, with 114 carries for 661 yards (5.8-yard avg.) and 7 rushing touchdowns.

As a senior in 1974, he led the team with 245 carries for 1,169 yards (4.8-yard avg.) and 12 rushing touchdowns. He finished his college career with 534 carries for 2,542 yards (4.8-yard avg.) and 41 rushing touchdowns. He passed Burden as the 7th ranked rusher in Wolfpack history.

== Professional career ==
Fritts was selected by the Cincinnati Bengals in the fourth round (97th overall) of the 1975 NFL draft. He appeared in 26 games with 9 starts.

== Personal life ==
He currently resides in Raleigh, North Carolina.
