= John Deraney =

American football player (born 1983)

No. 9
- Positions: Punter, placekicker

Personal information
- Born: September 5, 1983 (age 43); Fayetteville, Georgia, U.S.
- Listed height: 6 ft 4 in (1.93 m)
- Listed weight: 224 lb (102 kg)

Career information
- College: North Carolina State
- NFL draft: 2007: undrafted

Career history
- Detroit Lions (2007–2008)*
- * Offseason or practice squad member only

John Deraney (born September 5, 1983) is an American former professional football punter and placekicker. He played for the NC State Wolfpack football program from 2003 to 2006, handling punts, kickoffs, field goals, and extra points. He also set an all-time NC State record by converting 76 consecutive extra points and also set the school's single-season record with 2,968 punting yards in 2006.

== Early life ==
A Georgia native, Deraney played football at Fayette County High School.

== College career ==
Deraney played college football as a punter and place-kicker for the NC State Wolfpack football program who redshirted in 2002 and played from 2003 to 2006. He was described as "a one-man special-teams show" and a "triple threat", handling punts, field goals, and kickoffs for the Wolfpack. He was one of only 10 players nationally to handle all three kicking functions in 2004, and one of only eight to do so in 2006. In 2005, the Blue Ribbon Football Yearbook declared Deraney "the most irreplaceable player on the Wolfpack roster."

On kickoffs, Deraney was known for the high percentage of his kickoffs that went for touchbacks. As a punter, he kicked 208 times for 8,366 yards, an average of 40.2 yards per punt and downed 61 punts inside the 20-yard line. On field goals, he converted 40 of 58 attempts. He also converted 84 of 85 extra points and totaled 199 points during his four seasons at NC State. His total of 40 field goals ranked fourth in NC State history when he left the program (ranks seventh currently). He also set NC State records by converting 76 consecutive extra points and tallying 2,968 punting yards in a single season in 2006.

Prior to his 2006 redshirt senior season, Deraney's father, who suffered from multiple sclerosis, was placed in hospice care and given six months to live. Deraney continued to kick through the 2006 season, converting 12 of 16 field goals and 22 of 23 extra points.

== Professional football ==
In the spring of 2007, he was signed as an undrafted free agent punter by the Detroit Lions. His playing career was derailed by a torn ACL and meniscus in his left knee during the Lions' first preseason. In 2010, after extensive physical therapy and training, Deraney attempted a comeback, but he was not picked up by an NFL team.
