= Marc Primanti =

American college football player

No. 10
- Position: Placekicker

Career information
- College: NC State (1992–1996)

Awards and highlights
- Lou Groza Award (1996); Consensus All-American (1996); First-team All-ACC (1996)

Marc Primanti is an American former football placekicker who played college football for NC State Wolfpack. He won the Lou Groza Award and earned consensus All-American honors in 1996.

== College career ==
After graduating from Coatesville Area High School in Coatesville, Pennsylvania, Primanti attended North Carolina State University and was invited to play for the NC State Wolfpack football team as a walk-on placekicker in 1992. He was redshirted in 1992 and saw no game action in 1993 and 1994. In 1995, Primanti became the starting kicker for the Wolfpack and earned a full athletic scholarship. He went 11-of-13 for field goals and 27-of-28 for extra points during the season. In 1996, he completed a perfect 20-of-20 field goal attempts, as well as a perfect 24-for-24 in extra points. He had a season-long 48-yard field goal in a game against Alabama. Primanti set an Atlantic Coast Conference (ACC) record for consecutive field goals with 27, which spanned his two seasons as a starter. He won the Lou Groza Award following his perfect placekicking season, awarded to the top college football placekicker in the nation, also earned consensus first-team All-American recognition in 1996.

== Life after football ==
Primanti earned a degree in business management at North Carolina State. He is currently a business partner for FS Series, an event production and timing company based in North Carolina.
