= T. A. McLendon =

American football player (born 1983)

Profile
- Position: Running back

Personal information
- Born: February 21, 1983 (age 43); Albemarle, North Carolina, U.S.
- Listed height: 5 ft 10 in (1.78 m)
- Listed weight: 235 lb (107 kg)

Career information
- High school: Albemarle (Albemarle, North Carolina)
- College: North Carolina State Wolfpack (2002–2004)

Awards and highlights
- First-team All-ACC (2002); ACC Rookie of the Year (2002)

Tristan Akeen McLendon (born February 21, 1983) is an American former football player. Alongside Ken Hall and Brett Law, McLendon is one of the most productive high school football players of all time. In four seasons at Albemarle High School in Albemarle, North Carolina, McLendon rushed a total 9,004 yards and a national best 178 total touchdowns (170 rushing). In his final game, he rushed for 289 yards and a state-record seven touchdowns in leading Albemarle to the Class 1A state championship. He played in the 2002 U.S. Army All-American Bowl.

McLendon continued his football career at North Carolina State, becoming the focal point of the Wolfpack's offense as a freshman in 2002, earning Atlantic Coast Conference Rookie of the Year honors. He led the team with 1,101 yards on 245 carries (4.5 avg.), setting school single-season records with 18 touchdowns (tied ACC season mark for freshmen) and 108 points scored, adding 354 yards on 42 receptions (8.4 avg.), despite being hampered by two shoulder separations and a right wrist fracture. McLendon appeared in only nine games in 2003, but still led the team in rushing with 130 attempts for 608 yards and nine scores.

The injury bug would plague McLendon throughout the 2004 season. He strained his hamstring, missing the season opener vs. Richmond. McLendon re-injured the hamstring midway through the season vs. Maryland and it limited his performance the rest of the year. He still lead the team in rushing for the third straight year, gaining 770 yards on 167 carries (4.6 avg.) with six touchdowns.

McLendon entered the 2005 NFL draft as a junior, but went undrafted. McLendon said the experience of not playing professional football did not define him as a person. After leaving North Carolina, McLendon returned to his hometown of Albemarle, North Carolina. In 2023, McLendon was inducted into the Stanly County Sports Hall of Fame.
