= Naz Worthen =

American football player (born 1966)

No. 84
- Position: Wide receiver

Personal information
- Born: March 27, 1966 (age 60); Jacksonville, Florida, U.S.
- Listed height: 5 ft 8 in (1.73 m)
- Listed weight: 177 lb (80 kg)

Career information
- High school: Jean Ribault (Jacksonville)
- College: NC State
- NFL draft: 1989: 3rd round, 60th overall pick

Career history
- Kansas City Chiefs (1989–1990); Atlanta Falcons (1991)*
- * Offseason or practice squad member only

Awards and highlights
- Third-team All-American (1986); 2× First-team All-ACC (1986, 1988)

Career NFL statistics
- Receptions: 5
- Receiving yards: 69
- Return yards: 652
- Stats at Pro Football Reference

Nasrallah Onea Worthen (born March 27, 1966) is an American former professional football player who was a wide receiver in the National Football League (NFL).

Worthen was born and raised in Jacksonville, Florida and played scholastically at Jean Ribault High School. He played college football for the NC State Wolfpack. As a junior in 1986, he was selected as a third-team All-American by Football News.

Worthen was selected by the Kansas City Chiefs in the third round of the 1989 NFL draft with the 60th overall pick. He spent two seasons with the Chiefs, and was used mainly as a return specialist.
