= North Carolina–NC State football rivalry =

American college football rivalry

- North Carolina Tar Heels NC State Wolfpack
- First meeting: October 12, 1894; North Carolina, 44–0
- Latest meeting: November 29, 2025; NC State, 42–19
- Next meeting: November 28, 2026 in Chapel Hill

Statistics
- Total meetings: 115
- All-time series: North Carolina leads, 68–41–6 (.617)
- Largest victory: NC State, 48–3 (1988)
- Longest win streak: North Carolina, 9 (1943–1955)
- Current win streak: NC State, 5 (2021–present)

Locations of the two universities in North Carolina.

The North Carolina–NC State football rivalry is an American college football rivalry between the North Carolina Tar Heels football team of the University of North Carolina at Chapel Hill and the NC State Wolfpack football team of North Carolina State University.

Both universities are members of the Atlantic Coast Conference (ACC) and the yearly matchup is a protected rivalry in the expanded ACC. The rivalry game is played at the end of each season during Thanksgiving week. North Carolina leads the all-time series 68–41–6. Through 1955 North Carolina had built a commanding 34–5–6 series lead; since 1956 NC State leads 36–34. The Wolfpack have currently won five matchups in a row, in addition to 8 of the last 10 and 14 of the last 19 in the series. NC State won the most recent contest 42–19 on November 29, 2025. It is annually anticipated as the fiercest college football rivalry in the state of North Carolina.

Only twice in the history of the rivalry has the game been contested anywhere beside Chapel Hill or Raleigh. The game has been played 61 times in Chapel Hill, 52 times in Raleigh, and twice in Charlotte, North Carolina (1998 and 1999). Played uninterrupted since 1953, the game since 1965 has alternated annually between the two respective campuses (save for the aforementioned 1998 & 1999 games). Games in odd-numbered years are played in Raleigh at NC State, and even-numbered years in Chapel Hill at UNC.

== ACC era ==
North Carolina and NC State were both charter members of the Atlantic Coast Conference, which was founded in 1953. Since that year, the rivalry has been played every season without a break. NC State hired Earle Edwards as head coach in 1954, and he was able to have considerably more success against North Carolina than his predecessors. Edwards amassed a 6–3 record against North Carolina during that time period and a 9–8 record during his career as head coach of the Wolfpack, making him the winningest NC State coach against the Tar Heels.

In the first 26 seasons of the ACC, the series record was tied at 13. Beginning in 1979, North Carolina went on a seven-game winning streak. During this time, North Carolina head coach Dick Crum amassed an 8–2 record against the Wolfpack. NC State hired Dick Sheridan as head coach prior to the 1986 season, and he went 6–1 against the Tar Heels. Following Sheridan's retirement from coaching, North Carolina went on another seven-game winning streak, leaving NC State head coach Mike O'Cain winless against Tar Heels coaches Mack Brown and Carl Torbush. The 1998 and 1999 games were held at Bank of America Stadium in Charlotte, NC, with the Tar Heels victorious in both.

During the 2000s, NC State went 6–4 in the series, including winning the last three games of the decade under Tom O'Brien, who finished with a 5-1 record against Carolina. From 2000 to 2025, NC State leads 17–9. The series record in the ACC currently stands at 37–36 in favor of North Carolina. Mack Brown finished his career with a 7–9 record against NC State as head coach of the Tar Heels. His overall record against NC State as a head coach was 7–11 (UNC-Chapel Hill, Texas, and Appalachian State). NC State head coach Dave Doeren is currently 9–4 against UNC-Chapel Hill, including a 5–1 record in Kenan Stadium.

After the Wolfpack's victory and conclusion of the 2024 matchup in Chapel Hill, which was also the final game for the Tar Heels' coach Mack Brown, a minor skirmish broke out at the midfield line when players from the Wolfpack planted their flag into the midfield. This altercation came after a similar event had occurred earlier that day during the Michigan-Ohio State game. Both Brown and NC State head coach Dave Doeren later condemned the altercation, with Brown calling the altercation "disresepectful" during a postgame press conference.

In the latest meeting, NC State beat Carolina by a score of 42-19 in Raleigh. NC State got out to a big lead and never looked back, winning their 5th straight game in the rivalry.

== Game results ==
North Carolina victories	NC State victories

No.	Date	Location	Winner	Score
1	October 12, 1894	Chapel Hill, NC	North Carolina	44–0
2	October 20, 1894	Raleigh, NC	North Carolina	16–0
3	October 12, 1895	Chapel Hill, NC	North Carolina	36–0
4	October 2, 1897	Chapel Hill, NC	North Carolina	40–0
5	October 15, 1898	Chapel Hill, NC	North Carolina	34–0
6	October 7, 1899	Chapel Hill, NC	North Carolina	34–0
7	October 28, 1899	Raleigh, NC	Tie	11–11
8	October 16, 1901	Chapel Hill, NC	North Carolina	39–0
9	November 19, 1901	Raleigh, NC	North Carolina	30–0
10	November 8, 1902	Raleigh, NC	Tie	0–0
11	November 16, 1904	Chapel Hill, NC	Tie	6–6
12	November 12, 1905	Raleigh, NC	Tie	0–0
13	October 23, 1919	Raleigh, NC	North Carolina	13–12
14	October 21, 1920	Raleigh, NC	NC State	13–3
15	October 20, 1921	Raleigh, NC	NC State	7–0
16	October 19, 1922	Raleigh, NC	North Carolina	14–9
17	October 18, 1923	Raleigh, NC	North Carolina	14–0
18	October 16, 1924	Raleigh, NC	North Carolina	10–0
19	October 15, 1925	Raleigh, NC	North Carolina	17–6
20	October 30, 1926	Chapel Hill, NC	North Carolina	12–0
21	October 29, 1927	Raleigh, NC	NC State	19–6
22	November 3, 1928	Raleigh, NC	Tie	6–6
23	November 2, 1929	Chapel Hill, NC	North Carolina	32–0
24	November 7, 1930	Chapel Hill, NC	North Carolina	13–6
25	October 31, 1931	Raleigh, NC	North Carolina	18–15
26	October 29, 1932	Chapel Hill, NC	North Carolina	13–0
27	November 4, 1933	Raleigh, NC	North Carolina	6–0
28	October 27, 1934	Chapel Hill, NC	Tie	7–7
29	November 2, 1935	Raleigh, NC	North Carolina	35–6
30	October 31, 1936	Chapel Hill, NC	North Carolina	21–6
31	October 2, 1937	Raleigh, NC	North Carolina	20–0
32	October 31, 1938	Raleigh, NC	North Carolina	21–0
33	November 4, 1939	Chapel Hill, NC	#9 North Carolina	17–0
34	October 19, 1940	Raleigh, NC	North Carolina	13–7
35	November 1, 1941	Chapel Hill, NC	NC State	13–7
36	October 31, 1942	Raleigh, NC	NC State	21–14
37	October 30, 1943	Chapel Hill, NC	North Carolina	27–13
38	November 8, 1947	Chapel Hill, NC	#18 North Carolina	41–6
39	October 16, 1948	Chapel Hill, NC	#1 North Carolina	14–0
40	September 24, 1949	Chapel Hill, NC	North Carolina	26–6
41	September 23, 1950	Chapel Hill, NC	#20 North Carolina	13–7
42	September 22, 1951	Chapel Hill, NC	North Carolina	21–0
43	September 26, 1953	Chapel Hill, NC	North Carolina	29–7
44	September 25, 1954	Chapel Hill, NC	North Carolina	20–6
45	October 1, 1955	Raleigh, NC	North Carolina	25–18
46	September 22, 1956	Chapel Hill NC	NC State	26–6
47	September 21, 1957	Chapel Hill, NC	NC State	7–0
48	September 20, 1958	Chapel Hill, NC	NC State	21–14
49	October 3, 1959	Chapel Hill, NC	North Carolina	20–12
50	September 24, 1960	Chapel Hill, NC	NC State	3–0
51	September 30, 1961	Chapel Hill, NC	North Carolina	27–22
52	September 22, 1962	Chapel Hill, NC	NC State	7–6
53	October 19, 1963	Chapel Hill, NC	North Carolina	31–10
54	September 19, 1964	Chapel Hill, NC	NC State	14–13
55	October 9, 1965	Raleigh, NC	North Carolina	10–7
56	September 24, 1966	Chapel Hill, NC	North Carolina	10–7
57	September 16, 1967	Raleigh, NC	NC State	13–7
58	September 21, 1968	Chapel Hill, NC	NC State	38–6

No.	Date	Location	Winner	Score
59	September 20, 1969	Raleigh, NC	NC State	10–3
60	September 19, 1970	Chapel Hill, NC	North Carolina	19–0
61	October 2, 1971	Raleigh, NC	#20 North Carolina	27–7
62	September 23, 1972	Chapel Hill, NC	North Carolina	34–33
63	October 6, 1973	Raleigh, NC	NC State	28–26
64	October 19, 1974	Chapel Hill, NC	North Carolina	33–14
65	October 18, 1975	Raleigh, NC	NC State	21–20
66	October 16, 1976	Chapel Hill, NC	NC State	21–13
67	October 15, 1977	Raleigh, NC	North Carolina	27–14
68	October 21, 1978	Chapel Hill, NC	NC State	34–7
69	October 20, 1979	Raleigh, NC	#19 North Carolina	35–21
70	October 18, 1980	Chapel Hill, NC	#8 North Carolina	28–8
71	October 17, 1981	Raleigh, NC	#4 North Carolina	21–10
72	October 16, 1982	Chapel Hill, NC	#11 North Carolina	41–9
73	October 15, 1983	Raleigh, NC	#3 North Carolina	42–14
74	October 20, 1984	Chapel Hill, NC	North Carolina	28–21
75	October 19, 1985	Raleigh, NC	North Carolina	21–14
76	October 18, 1986	Chapel Hill, NC	NC State	35–34
77	October 17, 1987	Raleigh, NC	North Carolina	17–14
78	October 15, 1988	Chapel Hill, NC	NC State	48–3
79	September 23, 1989	Raleigh, NC	#18 NC State	40–6
80	September 29, 1990	Chapel Hill, NC	NC State	12–9
81	September 28, 1991	Raleigh, NC	NC State	24–7
82	September 26, 1992	Chapel Hill, NC	#23 NC State	27–20
83	September 25, 1993	Raleigh, NC	#18 North Carolina	35–14
84	October 29, 1994	Chapel Hill, NC	#24 North Carolina	31–17
85	November 24, 1995	Raleigh, NC	North Carolina	30–28
86	November 2, 1996	Chapel Hill, NC	#8 North Carolina	52–20
87	October 18, 1997	Raleigh, NC	#4 North Carolina	20–7
88	November 28, 1998	Charlotte, NC	North Carolina	37–34^{OT}
89	November 11, 1999	Charlotte, NC	North Carolina	10–6
90	October 14, 2000	Chapel Hill, NC	NC State	38–20
91	September 29, 2001	Raleigh, NC	North Carolina	17–9
92	October 12, 2002	Chapel Hill, NC	#14 NC State	34–17
93	September 27, 2003	Raleigh, NC	NC State	47–34
94	October 9, 2004	Chapel Hill, NC	North Carolina	30–24
95	September 24, 2005	Raleigh, NC	North Carolina	31–24
96	November 18, 2006	Chapel Hill, NC	North Carolina	23–9
97	November 10, 2007	Raleigh, NC	NC State	31–27
98	November 22, 2008	Chapel Hill, NC	NC State	41–10
99	November 28, 2009	Raleigh, NC	NC State	28–27
100	November 20, 2010	Chapel Hill, NC	NC State	29–25
101	November 5, 2011	Raleigh, NC	NC State	13–0
102	October 27, 2012	Chapel Hill, NC	North Carolina	43–35
103	November 2, 2013	Raleigh, NC	North Carolina	27–19
104	November 29, 2014	Chapel Hill, NC	NC State	35–7
105	November 28, 2015	Raleigh, NC	#14 North Carolina	45–34
106	November 25, 2016	Chapel Hill, NC	NC State	28–21
107	November 25, 2017	Raleigh, NC	NC State	33–21
108	November 24, 2018	Chapel Hill, NC	NC State	34–28^{OT}
109	November 30, 2019	Raleigh, NC	North Carolina	41–10
110	October 24, 2020	Chapel Hill, NC	#14 North Carolina	48–21
111	November 26, 2021	Raleigh, NC	#20 NC State	34–30
112	November 25, 2022	Chapel Hill, NC	NC State	30–27^{2OT}
113	November 25, 2023	Raleigh, NC	#22 NC State	39–20
114	November 30, 2024	Chapel Hill, NC	NC State	35–30
115	November 29, 2025	Raleigh, NC	NC State	42–19
Series: North Carolina leads 68–41–6

== See also ==
- List of NCAA college football rivalry games
- List of most-played college football series in NCAA Division I
- North Carolina–NC State rivalry
