= Tom O'Brien (American football) =

American football player and coach (born 1948)

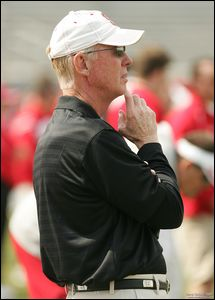

Biographical details
- Born: October 5, 1948 (age 78); Cincinnati, Ohio, U.S.

Playing career
- 1968–1970: Navy
- Position: Defensive end

Coaching career (HC unless noted)
- 1975–1981: Navy (OT/TE)
- 1982–1996: Virginia (OL/OC)
- 1997–2006: Boston College
- 2007–2012: NC State
- 2013–2014: Virginia (AHC-O/TE)

Head coaching record
- Overall: 115-80
- Bowls: 8–2

Accomplishments and honors

Championships
- 1 Big East (2004)

Thomas P. O’Brien, Jr. (born October 5, 1948), is a former American college football coach and player. He served as the head football coach at Boston College from 1997 to 2006 and North Carolina State University from 2007 to 2012, compiling a career college football head coaching record of 115 wins and 80 losses.

== Early life and education ==
O'Brien was born in Cincinnati, Ohio. He played football and baseball at St. Xavier High School, from which he graduated in 1966. O'Brien earned an appointment to the United States Naval Academy, where he was a three-year starter at defensive end for the Midshipmen from 1968 to 1970. He graduated from the Naval Academy in 1971 with a bachelor of science degree in management.

== Early career ==
After graduation, O'Brien served nine years in the Marines. During this time he began coaching as an assistant for Navy's plebe (freshman) team, then served at the Marine base in Quantico, Virginia, as well as tours of duty in California and Japan. O'Brien reached the rank of major in the Marine Corps Reserve.

In 1975, O'Brien returned to Navy and joined the staff of George Welsh, coaching tackles and tight ends. When Welsh became head coach at the University of Virginia in 1982, O'Brien joined his staff, where he remained for 15 years. During this period Virginia had 10 consecutive winning seasons and a share of two conference championships. O’Brien served as offensive coordinator in his final six seasons and consistently ran one of the top offenses in the Atlantic Coast Conference.

== Head coaching ==
=== Boston College ===
O'Brien became Boston College's 32nd head football coach on December 13, 1996. He took over a program coming off two straight losing seasons and reeling from a massive gambling scandal. O'Brien's first two Eagles teams responded with 4–7 records that included wins over Georgia Tech and West Virginia. He coached Mike Cloud to the BC all-time rushing record and first-team All-America honors. Cloud was a second-round draft pick of the Kansas City Chiefs while center Damien Woody was selected in the first round by the New England Patriots and offensive guard Doug Brzezinski was picked in the third round by the Philadelphia Eagles.

In 1999, three years of hard work paid off for O'Brien, his staff and players as they engineered the third-best turnaround in Division I college football. Led by Minnesota Vikings' first-round draft pick and All-American Chris Hovan, the Eagles registered three consecutive wins over Syracuse, West Virginia and Notre Dame to finish the regular season with an 8–3 record, a top 25 national ranking and a trip to the Insight.com Bowl - Boston College's first bowl appearance since 1994.

The 2000 Eagles posted a record of 7–5, including an impressive 31–17 win over Arizona State in the Aloha Bowl. Seven players earned All-Big East honors and offensive guard Paul Zukauskas earned first-team All-America honors. He was later chosen in the seventh round of the NFL draft by the Cleveland Browns.

The 2001 season was a satisfying one for O'Brien as the Eagles finished 8–4 and ranked in the top 25 in both major polls, capped by a 20–16 win over SEC powerhouse Georgia in the Music City Bowl. A 21–17 victory over Notre Dame gave the Eagles two wins in three years against their archrivals. Boston College gave eventual national champion Miami by far its biggest scare of the entire season at Alumni Stadium as the Hurricanes were able to pull out a victory only in the final seconds. Running back William Green rushed for 1,559 yards and was the second-leading rusher in the country and a consensus first-team All-America pick. Green (16th, Cleveland Browns) and offensive tackle Marc Colombo (29th, Chicago Bears) were selected in the first round of the NFL draft, the first time two BC players were picked in the first round.

Over the next few years, the team posted respectable won-lost records and continued to win bowl games. In 2002, BC went 9–4 and won the Motor City Bowl, in 2003 they were 8–5 with a victory in the San Francisco Bowl and finished 9–3 in 2004 with a win in the Continental Tire Bowl. The year 2004 would be the Eagles final campaign in the Big East. They finished the season in a four-way tie atop the league for their first (and so far only) football conference championship and closed the season ranked #21 in both major polls.

BC won eight straight postseason bowl games, the first six under O'Brien, between 2000 and 2008. BC ranked sixth nationally in Student-Athlete GPA for 2004–05.

=== NC State ===
In December 2006, O'Brien expressed his interest in the open job at North Carolina State, having already been considered (and passed over) for the North Carolina job (incidentally, BC had lost to NC State that fall). The program received permission from Boston College to interview O'Brien. After interviewing him on December 3 and doing negotiations, the two came to an agreement on December 6, with subsequent approval by the school two days later. O'Brien signed a seven year contract (with a considerable payraise from what he received at BC) with North Carolina State. He inherited a team that had gone 3–9 and lost its last seven games. Despite this, he referred to the school as "a sleeping giant" due to its focus on facilities. In his first year, after opening the season 1–5, his team won four straight games, including a win over 18th-ranked Virginia and road wins at East Carolina and Miami. Despite the slow start, his first Wolfpack squad went into the season finale with a bowl bid on the line.

In 2008, O'Brien's team became the first in Atlantic Coast Conference history to start the season 0–4 in league play and finish 4–0. The bid to the Papajohns.com Bowl marked the ninth bowl invitation in the past 10 years for O'Brien. His freshman quarterback, future NCAA All-American and NFL star Russell Wilson, became the first rookie in the history of the Atlantic Coast Conference to be named first-team all-conference at his position and it marked the sixth time in his 19 years in the league that a quarterback under O'Brien's tutelage was named the All-ACC signal caller.

In 2009, his team posted wins over Pittsburgh of the Big East and a third straight win over North Carolina, but was decimated by injuries and finished the season 5–7.

After being picked to finish fourth in the Atlantic Division in the preseason in 2010, the Wolfpack finished tied for second, was one game away from playing for an ACC title and was the third league team picked in the bowl selections. O'Brien's squad was the first Wolfpack team to garner nine wins since 2003 posted State’s first winning season in five years. With the Champs Sports Bowl victory over West Virginia, the 2010 squad tied the second highest win total in school history while finishing 9–4.

In 2011, after a brief stint in minor league baseball that caused him to miss spring practice, Russell Wilson transferred to Wisconsin for his final year of eligibility after O'Brien named Mike Glennon as his quarterback for the 2011 season. The Glennon-led Wolfpack finished the year with an 8–5 record.

On November 25, 2012, O'Brien received notice from NC State that he had been dismissed effective immediately after navigating the team to a 7–5 regular-season record. Athletic director Debbie Yow cited several reasons. She was concerned over lagging season-ticket sales, as well as his approach to recruiting. O'Brien's recruiting classes were frequently in the bottom half of the nation, and Yow wanted a coach who could bring top 25-type talent to Raleigh. NCSU was obligated to pay $1.2 million of non-state funds to O'Brien, as his contract ran through the 2015 season. However, NCSU ended up only having to pay O'Brien $200,000 after the buyout was renegotiated so he could become an assistant at Virginia. O'Brien announced he was retiring from coaching on January 6, 2015.

== Broadcasting career ==
After a brief retirement, O'Brien accepted an offer to become an ESPN College Football color analyst. In September 2017, O'Brien accepted an offer to become a color analyst for Navy Football Radio Network.

== Personal ==
O'Brien is active in community outreach programs and serves on the board of directors for the Marine Corps' "Toys for Tots." He was a major in the Marine Corps reserves.

O'Brien also owns a vacation home in South Carolina, where he plans to spend his retirement after coaching. He is married to the former Jennifer Byrd of San Diego, who is on the national board of Rostro de Cristo. They are the parents of three children.

== Head coaching record ==
Year	Team	Overall	Conference	Standing	Bowl/playoffs	Coaches^{#}	AP^{°}
Boston College Eagles (Big East Conference) (1997–2003)
1997	Boston College	4–7	3–4	T–5th			
1998	Boston College	4–7	3–4	5th			
1999	Boston College	8–4	4–3	3rd	L Insight.com		
2000	Boston College	7–5	3–4	T–5th	W Aloha		
2001	Boston College	8–4	4–3	T–3rd	W Music City	23	21
2002	Boston College	9–4	3–4	T–4th	W Motor City		
2003	Boston College	8–5	3–4	5th	W Emerald		
2004	Boston College	9–3	4–2	T–1st	W Continental Tire	21	21
Boston College Eagles (Atlantic Coast Conference) (2004–2005)
2005	Boston College	9–3	5–3	T–1st (Atlantic)	W MPC Computers	17	18
2006	Boston College	9–3 (Note: O'Brien coached the first 12 games of the season before resigning to become head coach at NC State. Frank Spaziani coached Boston College in Meineke Car Care.)	5–3	T–2nd (Atlantic)	Meineke Car Care	20	20
Boston College:		75–45	37–34				
NC State Wolfpack (Atlantic Coast Conference) (2007–2012)
2007	NC State	5–7	3–5	T–5th (Atlantic)			
2008	NC State	6–7	4–4	T–3rd (Atlantic)	L Papajohns.com		
2009	NC State	5–7	2–6	5th (Atlantic)			
2010	NC State	9–4	5–3	T–2nd (Atlantic)	W Champs Sports	25	25
2011	NC State	8–5	4–4	4th (Atlantic)	W Belk		
2012	NC State	7–5	4–4	3rd (Atlantic)	Music City*		
NC State:		40–35	22–26	* Did not coach bowl game			
Total:		115–80					
National championship Conference title Conference division title or championship game berth
^{†}Indicates Bowl Coalition, Bowl Alliance, BCS, or CFP / New Years' Six bowl.; ^{#}Rankings from final Coaches Poll.; ^{°}Rankings from final AP Poll.
