= Jarvis Williams (wide receiver) =

American football player (born 1987)

No. 11
- Position: Wide receiver

Personal information
- Born: October 15, 1987 (age 39); Orlando, Florida, U.S.
- Listed height: 6 ft 4 in (1.93 m)
- Listed weight: 220 lb (100 kg)

Career information
- High school: Orlando (FL) Jones
- College: NC State
- NFL draft: 2011: undrafted

Career history
- Orlando Predators (2012); Jacksonville Sharks (2013); Orlando Predators (2013); San Jose SaberCats (2014); Tampa Bay Storm (2015)

Career AFL statistics
- Receptions: 105
- Receiving yards: 1,062
- Receiving touchdowns: 27
- Total tackles: 31
- Stats at ArenaFan.com

Jarvis Williams (born October 15, 1987) is an American former football wide receiver. He played college football at the North Carolina State University.

== College career ==
Williams continued his football career in college, playing for the NC State Wolfpack football team. During his college career, he had 133 receptions for 1,764 yards and 20 touchdowns; all of which rank in the top 11 of their respective categories for Wolfpack receivers.

== Professional career ==
=== Orlando Predators ===
In 2012, Williams was assigned to the Orlando Predators of the Arena Football League (AFL).

=== Jacksonville Sharks ===
In March 2013, Williams signed with the Jacksonville Sharks. In late May, Williams was placed on recallable reassignment.

=== Orlando Predators (second stint) ===
Williams returned to the Predators to finish the 2013 season.

=== San Jose SaberCats ===
On January 16, 2014, Williams was traded to the San Jose SaberCats for Justin Edison. Williams was plagued with injuries, twice being listed on injured reserve by the SaberCats.

=== Tampa Bay Storm ===
Williams was assigned to the Tampa Bay Storm in 2015. He was placed on reassignment on May 11, 2015.
