= Textile Bowl =

American college football rivalry

- Clemson Tigers NC State Wolfpack
- First meeting: November 18, 1899; Clemson 24, North Carolina A&M 0
- Latest meeting: September 21, 2024; Clemson 59, NC State 35
- Next meeting: 2027
- Trophy: Textile Bowl (since 1981)

Statistics
- Total meetings: 92
- All-time series: Clemson leads, 61–30–1
- Trophy series: Clemson leads, 29–12
- Largest victory: Clemson, 55–10 (2019)
- Longest win streak: Clemson, 8 (2012–2019)
- Current win streak: Clemson, 1 (2024–present)

Locations of the two universities.

The Textile Bowl is the name given to the Clemson–NC State football rivalry. It is an American college football rivalry game played annually by the Clemson Tigers football team of Clemson University and the NC State Wolfpack football team of North Carolina State University.

== History ==
The rivalry game has been known as the Textile Bowl since 1981. The two universities are founding members of the Atlantic Coast Conference (ACC), and both have competed in the ACC's Atlantic Division since the conference initiated divisional play. The rivalry's name is derived from the fact that Clemson and North Carolina State have two of the largest university-level textile schools in the world, and from the textile industry's historic importance in the economic development of their respective states of South Carolina and North Carolina.

The rivalry is usually considered good-natured due to how similar the two universities are in terms of mission, academics, and fans. The rivalry was played annually from 1971 to 2019.

In the days and weeks leading up to the game each year, both universities host special programs and events promoting each other's textile programs. In recent years, students from Clemson go on visits of the North Carolina State campus in Raleigh, NC and vice versa.

While the rivalry has diminished in national prominence compared to NC State's in-state rivalries with the North Carolina Tar Heels, the Duke Blue Devils, ant the Wake Forest Demon Deacons, and Clemson's rivalries with the South Carolina Gamecocks, the Georgia Bulldogs, and the Florida State Seminoles, it remains significant to alumni and the communities surrounding both universities.The game was continuously played from 1971 to 2019, however due to the COVID-19 pandemic in the United States, the ACC shifted to a ten-game conference schedule for the 2020 season. 2020 was the first time since 1970 that the Wolfpack and Tigers did not play.

=== 2021-present ===
In 2021, the Wolfpack beat the Tigers 27–21 in double overtime, securing their first win in the series since 2011. NC State controlled their own destiny in the ACC Atlantic before suffering losses to Miami and Wake Forest. Wake Forest ultimately won the ACC Atlantic for the first time since 2006. In 2022, both teams came in with 4–0 records and were both ranked in the top 10 (Clemson at No. 5 and NC State at No. 10) with ESPN's College GameDay making an appearance in Clemson. Clemson was coming off of a scare from Wake Forest (the Tigers narrowly won 51–45 in double overtime in a high-scoring shootout), while NC State was coming off of a 41–10 thrashing of UConn. Ultimately the Tigers got their revenge on the Wolfpack and won 30–20; Clemson ultimately won the ACC Atlantic as NC State and Wake Forest had surprising late-season collapses, but the Tigers did not get a Playoff spot as a result of their two losses to non-conference opponents Notre Dame and rival South Carolina. In 2023, the rivalry swung back to the Wolfpack as they won 24–17 over a struggling Clemson team, though each team would win their remaining regular season games. The following season, Clemson dominated, 59–35, behind quarterback Cade Klubnik and a potent rushing attack that gained 269 yards. With the addition of Cal, Stanford, and SMU to the ACC beginning in the 2024 season and the elimination of divisions in the conference, the two schools will no longer play annually, making it the first time since 1969 and 1970 that the two teams will not play for a non-pandemic reason. This also gives them the opportunity to play each other in the ACC Championship Game, something that wasn't possible in division play in the ACC.

== Game results ==
Clemson victories	NC State victories	Tie games

No.	Date	Location	Winner	Score
1	November 18, 1899	Rock Hill, SC	Clemson	24–0
2	October 4, 1902	Clemson, SC	Clemson	11–5
3	October 28, 1903	Columbia, SC	Clemson	24–0
4	November 24, 1904	Raleigh, NC	North Carolina A&M	18–0
5	October 25, 1906	Columbia, SC	Tie	0–0
6	October 9, 1926	Clemson, SC	Clemson	7–3
7	October 8, 1927	Raleigh, NC	NC State	18–6
8	October 12, 1928	Florence, SC	Clemson	7–0
9	October 11, 1929	Florence, SC	Clemson	26–0
10	October 11, 1930	Charlotte, NC	Clemson	27–0
11	October 10, 1931	Charlotte, NC	Clemson	6–0
12	October 8, 1932	Raleigh, NC	NC State	13–0
13	October 7, 1933	Clemson, SC	Clemson	9–0
14	November 3, 1934	Raleigh, NC	Clemson	12–6
15	October 7, 1939	Charlotte, NC	Clemson	25–6
16	October 5, 1940	Charlotte, NC	Clemson	26–7
17	October 4, 1941	Charlotte, NC	Clemson	27–6
18	October 3, 1942	Charlotte, NC	NC State	7–6
19	October 2, 1943	Charlotte, NC	Clemson	19–7
20	October 7, 1944	Charlotte, NC	Clemson	13–7
21	October 6, 1945	Raleigh, NC	Clemson	13–0
22	October 5, 1946	Clemson, SC	NC State	14–7
23	October 11, 1947	Raleigh, NC	NC State	18–0
24	October 2, 1948	Clemson, SC	Clemson	6–0
25	October 1, 1949	Raleigh, NC	Clemson	7–6
26	October 7, 1950	Clemson, SC	#18 Clemson	27–0
27	October 6, 1951	Raleigh, NC	#18 Clemson	6–0
28	October 6, 1956	Raleigh, NC	Clemson	13–7
29	October 5, 1957	Clemson, SC	#13 NC State	13–7
30	November 15, 1958	Raleigh, NC	Clemson	13–6
31	October 10, 1959	Clemson, SC	Clemson	23–0
32	November 25, 1961	Clemson, SC	Clemson	20–0
33	September 29, 1962	Raleigh, NC	Clemson	7–0
34	October 5, 1963	Clemson, SC	NC State	7–3
35	September 26, 1964	Raleigh, NC	NC State	9–0
36	September 18, 1965	Clemson, SC	Clemson	21–7
37	November 19, 1966	Raleigh, NC	NC State	23–14
38	November 18, 1967	Clemson, SC	Clemson	14–6
39	November 2, 1968	Raleigh, NC	Clemson	24–19
40	November 20, 1971	Clemson, SC	NC State	31–23
41	November 18, 1972	Raleigh, NC	NC State	42–17
42	October 27, 1973	Clemson, SC	NC State	29–6
43	September 21, 1974	Raleigh, NC	#15 NC State	31–10
44	October 25, 1975	Clemson, SC	NC State	45–7
45	October 23, 1976	Raleigh, NC	NC State	38–21
46	October 22, 1977	Clemson, SC	#20 Clemson	7–3
47	October 28, 1978	Raleigh, NC	#20 Clemson	33–10

No.	Date	Location	Winner	Score
48	October 27, 1979	Clemson, SC	NC State	16–13
49	October 25, 1980	Raleigh, NC	NC State	24–20
50	October 24, 1981	Clemson, SC	#4 Clemson	17–7
51	October 23, 1982	Raleigh, NC	#18 Clemson	38–29
52	October 22, 1983	Clemson, SC	Clemson	27–17
53	October 27, 1984	Raleigh, NC	Clemson	35–34
54	October 26, 1985	Clemson, SC	Clemson	39–10
55	October 25, 1986	Raleigh, NC	#20 NC State	27–3
56	October 24, 1987	Clemson, SC	NC State	30–28
57	October 22, 1988	Raleigh, NC	NC State	10–3
58	October 21, 1989	Clemson, SC	Clemson	30–10
59	October 20, 1990	Raleigh, NC	#22 Clemson	24–17
60	October 26, 1991	Clemson, SC	#19 Clemson	29–19
61	October 24, 1992	Raleigh, NC	#23 NC State	20–6
62	October 2, 1993	Clemson, SC	Clemson	20–14
63	September 10, 1994	Clemson, SC	NC State	29–12
64	September 30, 1995	Raleigh, NC	Clemson	43–22
65	November 16, 1996	Clemson, SC	Clemson	40–17
66	September 13, 1997	Raleigh, NC	#19 Clemson	19–17
67	October 31, 1998	Clemson, SC	NC State	46–39
68	October 9, 1999	Raleigh, NC	NC State	35–31
69	October 7, 2000	Clemson, SC	#5 Clemson	34–27
70	October 13, 2001	Raleigh, NC	#16 Clemson	45–37
71	October 24, 2002	Clemson, SC	#12 NC State	38–6
72	October 16, 2003	Raleigh, NC	NC State	17–15
73	October 30, 2004	Clemson, SC	Clemson	26–20
74	October 13, 2005	Raleigh, NC	Clemson	31–10
75	November 11, 2006	Clemson, SC	Clemson	20–14
76	September 22, 2007	Raleigh, NC	#15 Clemson	42–20
77	September 13, 2008	Clemson, SC	Clemson	27–9
78	November 14, 2009	Raleigh, NC	#24 Clemson	43–23
79	November 6, 2010	Clemson, SC	Clemson	14–13
80	November 19, 2011	Raleigh, NC	NC State	37–13
81	November 17, 2012	Clemson, SC	#11 Clemson	62–48
82	September 19, 2013	Raleigh, NC	#3 Clemson	26–14
83	October 4, 2014	Clemson, SC	Clemson	41–0
84	October 31, 2015	Raleigh, NC	#3 Clemson	56–41
85	October 15, 2016	Clemson, SC	#3 Clemson	24–17^{OT}
86	November 4, 2017	Raleigh, NC	#6 Clemson	38–31
87	October 20, 2018	Clemson, SC	#3 Clemson	41–7
88	November 9, 2019	Raleigh, NC	#4 Clemson	55–10
89	September 25, 2021	Raleigh, NC	NC State	27–21^{2OT}
90	October 1, 2022	Clemson, SC	#5 Clemson	30–20
91	October 28, 2023	Raleigh, NC	NC State	24–17
92	September 21, 2024	Clemson, SC	#21 Clemson	59–35
Series: Clemson leads 61–30–1

== See also ==
- List of NCAA college football rivalry games
