= NC State–Wake Forest rivalry =

American college sports rivalry

Locations of the two universities in North Carolina.

The NC State–Wake Forest rivalry is a series of athletic contests between in-state rivals, the North Carolina State University Wolfpack and the Wake Forest University Demon Deacons. The first game was played in 1895 between the two institutions. Wake Forest was originally located in Wake Forest, North Carolina (approximately 18 miles NNE of NCSU's campus in Raleigh) until it moved its campus across the state of North Carolina to Winston-Salem, North Carolina in 1956. The two universities are members of the Atlantic Coast Conference, where they meet every year in football due to being aligned in the Atlantic Division. The schools play each other twice in basketball every season, due to being primary partners. The game is part of the Tobacco Road rivalry series.

== Football ==
NC State–Wake Forest football rivalry
- NC State Wolfpack Wake Forest Demon Deacons
- First meeting: October 19, 1895; North Carolina A&M 4, Wake Forest 4
- Latest meeting: October 10, 2026; Wake Forest 38, NC State 14
- Next meeting: TBD

Statistics
- Total meetings: 120
- All-time series: NC State leads, 70–44–6
- Largest victory: NC State, 76–0 (1908)
- Longest win streak: NC State, 10 (1908–1917)
- Current win streak: Wake Forest, 1 (2026–present)

The NC State–Wake Forest football rivalry is an American college football rivalry between the NC State Wolfpack football team of North Carolina State University and the Wake Forest Demon Deacons football team of Wake Forest University. Playing consecutively every year since 1910, it is the longest continuous rivalry between two ACC schools, and is the second longest streak nationally in Division I FBS at 117 consecutive seasons through 2026 (only Minnesota vs Wisconsin has a longer streak, by three seasons). Both universities are members of the Atlantic Coast Conference (ACC) and were members of the Atlantic Division. There have been 120 meetings between the two teams, with NC State leading the all-time series 70–44–6. In 2021, the game between NC State and Wake Forest decided the ACC Atlantic Division champion; Wake Forest won 45–42 and played in the ACC Championship, losing 45–21 to Pittsburgh. Wake Forest won the most recent contest between the two schools on October 10, 2026, in Raleigh by a score of 38–14.

=== Game results ===
NC State victories	Wake Forest victories	Tie games

No.	Date	Location	Winner	Score
1	October 19, 1895	Raleigh, NC	Tie	4–4
2	October 3, 1908	Wake Forest, NC	North Carolina A&M	25–0
3	November 21, 1908	Raleigh, NC	North Carolina A&M	76–0
4	November 19, 1910	Raleigh, NC	North Carolina A&M	23–3
5	November 18, 1911	Wake Forest, NC	North Carolina A&M	13–6
6	November 2, 1912	Wake Forest, NC	North Carolina A&M	12–0
7	November 1, 1913	Wake Forest, NC	North Carolina A&M	37–0
8	October 3, 1914	Raleigh, NC	North Carolina A&M	51–0
9	October 16, 1915	Wake Forest, NC	North Carolina A&M	7–0
10	October 19, 1916	Wake Forest, NC	North Carolina A&M	6–0
11	October 18, 1917	Raleigh, NC	North Carolina A&M	17–6
12	November 23, 1918	Raleigh, NC	Wake Forest	21–0
13	November 27, 1919	Raleigh, NC	NC State	21–7
14	November 25, 1920	Wake Forest, NC	NC State	49–7
15	November 19, 1921	Wake Forest, NC	NC State	14–0
16	November 25, 1922	Wake Forest, NC	NC State	32–0
17	November 24, 1923	Wake Forest, NC	Wake Forest	14–0
18	November 22, 1924	Raleigh, NC	Wake Forest	12–0
19	November 14, 1925	Raleigh, NC	NC State	6–0
20	November 29, 1926	Raleigh, NC	NC State	7–3
21	October 13, 1927	Raleigh, NC	NC State	30–7
22	October 18, 1928	Raleigh, NC	NC State	37–0
23	October 17, 1929	Raleigh, NC	NC State	8–6
24	October 16, 1930	Raleigh, NC	Wake Forest	7–0
25	October 16, 1931	Raleigh, NC	Wake Forest	6–0
26	October 15, 1932	Raleigh, NC	Tie	0–0
27	October 21, 1933	Raleigh, NC	Tie	0–0
28	October 6, 1934	Raleigh, NC	Wake Forest	13–12
29	October 12, 1935	Raleigh, NC	NC State	21–6
30	October 3, 1936	Raleigh, NC	Wake Forest	9–0
31	October 23, 1937	Wake Forest, NC	NC State	20–0
32	October 15, 1938	Raleigh, NC	NC State	19–7
33	October 14, 1939	Raleigh, NC	Wake Forest	32–0
34	November 9, 1940	Raleigh, NC	Wake Forest	20–14
35	October 18, 1941	Raleigh, NC	Wake Forest	7–0
36	October 17, 1942	Raleigh, NC	Tie	0–0
37	October 16, 1943	Raleigh, NC	Wake Forest	54–6
38	October 21, 1944	Raleigh, NC	Wake Forest	21–7
39	October 20, 1945	Raleigh, NC	Wake Forest	19–18
40	October 19, 1946	Wake Forest, NC	NC State	14–6
41	November 15, 1947	Raleigh, NC	NC State	20–0
42	October 30, 1948	Wake Forest, NC	Wake Forest	34–13
43	November 12, 1949	Raleigh, NC	NC State	27–14
44	November 18, 1950	Wake Forest, NC	Tie	6–6
45	September 29, 1951	Raleigh, NC	Wake Forest	21–6
46	November 1, 1952	Wake Forest, NC	Wake Forest	21–6
47	October 17, 1953	Raleigh, NC	Wake Forest	20–7
48	October 2, 1954	Wake Forest, NC	Wake Forest	26–0
49	October 15, 1955	Raleigh, NC	Tie	13–13
50	November 3, 1956	Winston-Salem, NC	Wake Forest	13–0
51	November 2, 1957	Raleigh, NC	#10 NC State	19–0
52	October 11, 1958	Winston-Salem, NC	Wake Forest	13–7
53	October 17, 1959	Raleigh, NC	Wake Forest	17–14
54	November 5, 1960	Winston-Salem, NC	NC State	14–12
55	October 21, 1961	Raleigh, NC	NC State	7–0
56	November 22, 1962	Winston-Salem, NC	NC State	27–3
57	November 22, 1963	Raleigh, NC	NC State	42–0
58	November 20, 1964	Winston-Salem, NC	Wake Forest	27–13
59	September 25, 1965	Raleigh, NC	NC State	13–11
60	October 1, 1966	Winston-Salem, NC	NC State	15–12
61	October 21, 1967	Raleigh, NC	#5 NC State	24–7

No.	Date	Location	Winner	Score
62	September 14, 1968	Winston-Salem, NC	NC State	10–6
63	September 13, 1969	Raleigh, NC	Wake Forest	22–21
64	November 14, 1970	Winston-Salem, NC	Wake Forest	16–3
65	October 9, 1971	Raleigh, NC	NC State	21–14
66	October 14, 1972	Winston-Salem, NC	NC State	42–13
67	November 24, 1973	Raleigh, NC	#16 NC State	52–13
68	September 7, 1974	Winston-Salem, NC	#18 NC State	33–15
69	September 13, 1975	Raleigh, NC	Wake Forest	30–22
70	September 11, 1976	Winston-Salem, NC	Wake Forest	20–18
71	September 24, 1977	Raleigh, NC	NC State	41–14
72	September 30, 1978	Winston-Salem, NC	NC State	34–10
73	September 29, 1979	Raleigh, NC	#16 NC State	17–14
74	September 27, 1980	Raleigh, NC	Wake Forest	27–7
75	September 12, 1981	Winston-Salem, NC	NC State	28–23
76	September 18, 1982	Raleigh, NC	NC State	30–0
77	October 1, 1983	Winston-Salem, NC	NC State	38–15
78	September 22, 1984	Raleigh, NC	Wake Forest	24–15
79	September 21, 1985	Winston-Salem, NC	NC State	20–17
80	September 20, 1986	Raleigh, NC	NC State	42–38
81	September 19, 1987	Winston-Salem, NC	Wake Forest	21–3
82	September 17, 1988	Raleigh, NC	NC State	14–6
83	September 16, 1989	Winston-Salem, NC	#19 NC State	27–17
84	September 15, 1990	Raleigh, NC	NC State	20–15
85	September 16, 1991	Winston-Salem, NC	NC State	30–3
86	November 21, 1992	Raleigh, NC	#13 NC State	42–14
87	September 11, 1993	Winston-Salem, NC	#18 NC State	34–16
88	October 15, 1994	Raleigh, NC	NC State	34–3
89	November 18, 1995	Winston-Salem, NC	NC State	52–23
90	November 23, 1996	Raleigh, NC	NC State	37–22
91	September 25, 1997	Winston-Salem, NC	Wake Forest	19–18
92	November 7, 1998	Raleigh, NC	NC State	38–27
93	September 25, 1999	Winston-Salem, NC	Wake Forest	31–17
94	November 25, 2000	Raleigh, NC	NC State	32–14
95	October 6, 2001	Winston-Salem, NC	NC State	17–14
96	September 14, 2002	Raleigh, NC	#19 NC State	32–13
97	September 6, 2003	Winston-Salem, NC	Wake Forest	38–24
98	October 2, 2004	Raleigh, NC	NC State	27–21^{OT}
99	October 22, 2005	Winston-Salem, NC	Wake Forest	27–19
100	October 14, 2006	Raleigh, NC	Wake Forest	25–23
101	November 17, 2007	Winston-Salem, NC	Wake Forest	38–18
102	November 15, 2008	Raleigh, NC	NC State	21–17
103	October 3, 2009	Winston-Salem, NC	Wake Forest	30–24
104	November 13, 2010	Raleigh, NC	NC State	38–3
105	September 10, 2011	Winston-Salem, NC	Wake Forest	34–27
106	November 10, 2012	Raleigh, NC	NC State	37–6
107	October 5, 2013	Winston-Salem, NC	Wake Forest	28–13
108	November 6, 2014	Raleigh, NC	NC State	42–13
109	October 24, 2015	Winston-Salem, NC	NC State	35–17
110	October 1, 2016	Raleigh, NC	NC State	33–16
111	November 18, 2017	Winston-Salem, NC	Wake Forest	30–24
112	November 8, 2018	Raleigh, NC	Wake Forest	27–23
113	November 2, 2019	Winston-Salem, NC	#23 Wake Forest	44–10
114	September 19, 2020	Raleigh, NC	NC State	45–42
115	November 13, 2021	Winston-Salem, NC	#12 Wake Forest	45–42
116	November 5, 2022	Raleigh, NC	#22 NC State	30–21
117	November 11, 2023	Winston-Salem, NC	NC State	26–6
118	October 5, 2024	Raleigh, NC	Wake Forest	34–30
119	September 11, 2025	Winston-Salem, NC	NC State	34–24
120	October 10, 2026	Raleigh, NC	Wake Forest	38–14
Series: NC State leads 70–44–6

== Men's basketball ==
NC State–Wake Forest men's basketball rivalry
- NC State Wolfpack Wake Forest
- First meeting: 1911; Wake Forest 33, North Carolina A&M 6
- Latest meeting: January 31, 2026; NC State 96, Wake Forest 78
- Next meeting: TBD

Statistics
- Total meetings: 264
- All-time series: NC State leads, 154–110
- Largest victory: NC State, 130–89 (1983)
- Longest win streak: NC State, 10 (twice)
- Current win streak: NC State, 3 (2025–present)

NC State currently leads the series 154–110.

The rivalry dates back to when Wake Forest was in Wake Forest, NC, and was only a short distance from NC State's campus in Raleigh. Their rivalry eventually expanded into the Big Four with UNC-Chapel Hill and Duke, which are recognized as being some of the fiercest rivalries in NCAA men's basketball. The two teams met twice during the 2025–26 ACC regular season, with NC State winning both contests.

=== Game results ===
NC State victories	Wake Forest victories

No.	Date	Winner	Score
1	1910–11	Wake Forest	33–6
2	1910–11	North Carolina A&M	19–18
3	1911–12	Wake Forest	23–14
4	1911–12	Wake Forest	50–9
5	1911–12	Wake Forest	28–9
6	1912–13	North Carolina A&M	43–26
7	1912–13	Wake Forest	34–20
8	1913–14	Wake Forest	24–15
9	1913–14	Wake Forest	29–22
10	1915–16	Wake Forest	26–24
11	1915–16	Wake Forest	34–23
12	1916–17	North Carolina A&M	30–29
13	1916–17	Wake Forest	30–24
14	1917–18	NC State	30–8
15	1917–18	NC State	20–17
16	1917–18	NC State	31–17
17	1918–19	NC State	29–16
18	1918–19	Wake Forest	29–20
19	1918–19	NC State	26–17
20	1919–20	NC State	38–23
21	1919–20	NC State	30–18
22	1920–21	Wake Forest	20–10
23	1920–21	NC State	20–10
24	1921–22	Wake Forest	27–20
25	1921–22	Wake Forest	25–22
26	1922–23	Wake Forest	27–20
27	1922–23	Wake Forest	25–22
28	1923–24	Wake Forest	29–15
29	1923–24	Wake Forest	25–17
30	1924–25	Wake Forest	29–24
31	1924–25	NC State	26–25
32	1925–26	NC State	37–33
33	1925–26	NC State	27–18
34	1926–27	Wake Forest	20–18
35	1926–27	Wake Forest	27–25
36	1927–28	NC State	41–39
37	1927–28	NC State	48–41
38	1927–28	NC State	45–30
39	1928–29	NC State	27–20
40	1928–29	NC State	44–12
41	1929–30	NC State	38–10
42	1930–31	NC State	42–20
43	1930–31	Wake Forest	20–19
44	1931–32	NC State	19–14
45	1931–32	Wake Forest	27–24
46	1932–33	Wake Forest	23–19
47	1932–33	NC State	25–22
48	1933–34	NC State	27–19
49	1933–34	NC State	33–19
50	1934–35	NC State	52–26
51	1934–35	NC State	39–20
52	1935–36	NC State	36–22
53	1935–36	NC State	26–24
54	1936–37	NC State	49–31
55	1936–37	Wake Forest	41–33
56	1937–38	NC State	45–44
57	1937–38	NC State	45–41
58	1938–39	Wake Forest	46–26
59	1938–39	Wake Forest	46–42
60	1939–40	NC State	38–32
61	1939–40	Wake Forest	61–23
62	1940–41	Wake Forest	50–40
63	1940–41	NC State	40–37
64	1941–42	Wake Forest	44–43
65	1941–42	NC State	44–38
66	1942–43	NC State	42–37
67	1942–43	NC State	52–36
68	1944–45	NC State	57–37
69	1944–45	NC State	46–38
70	1945–46	NC State	34–30
71	1945–46	Wake Forest	47–27
72	1946–47	NC State	65–48
73	1946–47	Wake Forest	44–39
74	1947–48	NC State	72–43
75	1947–48	NC State	65–54
76	1948–49	Wake Forest	52–49
77	1948–49	NC State	83–39
78	1948–49	NC State	64–42
79	1949–50	#9 NC State	57–50
80	1949–50	#8 NC State	73–35
81	1949–50	#8 NC State	59–53
82	1950–51	#6 NC State	72–56
83	1950–51	#9 NC State	64–45
84	1950–51	#9 NC State	78–56
85	1951–52	NC State	65–62
86	1951–52	NC State	65–51
87	1952–53	Wake Forest	51–50
88	1952–53	#12 NC State	99–80
89	1952–53	Wake Forest	71–70
90	1953–54	Wake Forest	81–69
91	1953–54	Wake Forest	86–78
92	1953–54	NC State	91–76
93	1953–54	#18 NC State	82–80
94	1954–55	#10 NC State	100–81
95	1954–55	#2 NC State	75–73
96	1954–55	#5 NC State	85–70
97	1955–56	#3 NC State	90–81
98	1955–56	#3 NC State	70–58
99	1955–56	#6 NC State	80–78
100	1955–56	#5 NC State	76–64
101	1956–57	NC State	73–63
102	1956–57	Wake Forest	73–66
103	1956–57	NC State	75–71
104	1956–57	#20 Wake Forest	66–57
105	1957–58	NC State	62–51
106	1957–58	#13 NC State	63–61
107	1957–58	#11 NC State	91–70
108	1958–59	NC State	56–52
109	1958–59	#1 NC State	64–59
110	1959–60	Wake Forest	73–59
111	1959–60	NC State	51–45
112	1959–60	#18 Wake Forest	71–66
113	1960–61	Wake Forest	68–67
114	1960–61	#10 NC State	99–91
115	1960–61	Wake Forest	76–66
116	1961–62	Wake Forest	69–62
117	1961–62	#3 Wake Forest	77–65
118	1962–63	Wake Forest	79–70
119	1962–63	Wake Forest	66–58
120	1963–64	NC State	56–53
121	1963–64	Wake Forest	74–55
122	1964–65	Wake Forest	86–80
123	1964–65	NC State	87–81
124	1965–66	NC State	101–75
125	1965–66	NC State	121–100
126	1966–67	Wake Forest	87–67
127	1966–67	NC State	64–59
128	1967–68	NC State	79–63
129	1967–68	Wake Forest	72–66
130	1968–69	NC State	69–67
131	1968–69	Wake Forest	88–79
132	1968–69	Wake Forest	52–49
133	1968–69	Wake Forest	81–73

No.	Date	Winner	Score
134	1969–70	#10 NC State	75–72
135	1969–70	#12 NC State	104–86
136	1970–71	NC State	73–70
137	1970–71	Wake Forest	83–76
138	1970–71	Wake Forest	89–85
139	1971–72	NC State	84–76
140	1971–72	NC State	86–78
141	1972–73	#6 NC State	88–83
142	1972–73	#2 NC State	81–59
143	1972–73	#2 NC State	100–77
144	1973–74	#5 NC State	91–73
145	1973–74	#2 NC State	111–96
146	1973–74	#1 NC State	72–63
147	1974–75	Wake Forest	83–78
148	1974–75	#5 NC State	106–80
149	1974–75	#5 NC State	89–87
150	1975–76	Wake Forest	93–78
151	1975–76	#12 NC State	87–85
152	1975–76	Wake Forest	98–96
153	1976–77	#4 Wake Forest	84–77
154	1976–77	NC State	91–85
155	1977–78	NC State	79–77
156	1977–78	NC State	88–77
157	1977–78	Wake Forest	87–81
158	1978–79	#6 NC State	77–70
159	1978–79	Wake Forest	60–56
160	1978–79	NC State	90–66
161	1979–80	NC State	44–41
162	1979–80	NC State	52–40
163	1979–80	NC State	70–65
164	1980–81	Wake Forest	87–57
165	1980–81	#5 Wake Forest	60–52
166	1980–81	NC State	66–65
167	1981–82	#12 NC State	52–50
168	1981–82	#18 Wake Forest	50–46
169	1982–83	Wake Forest	91–73
170	1982–83	NC State	130–89
171	1982–83	NC State	71–70
172	1983–84	NC State	80–69
173	1983–84	#17 Wake Forest	84–75
174	1984–85	Wake Forest	91–64
175	1984–85	#16 NC State	66–64
176	1985–86	NC State	77–64
177	1985–86	NC State	45–44
178	1986–87	#17 NC State	75–67
179	1986–87	NC State	80–76
180	1986–87	NC State	77–73
181	1987–88	Wake Forest	71–67
182	1987–88	#16 NC State	86–82
183	1988–89	#15 NC State	82–64
184	1988–89	#20 NC State	110–103
185	1989–90	#19 NC State	61–57
186	1989–90	Wake Forest	93–91
187	1990–91	Wake Forest	97–76
188	1990–91	Wake Forest	89–84
189	1991–92	Wake Forest	86–73
190	1991–92	NC State	77–74
191	1992–93	#13 Wake Forest	65–54
192	1992–93	#14 Wake Forest	80–68
193	1993–94	Wake Forest	72–60
194	1993–94	NC State	71–63
195	1994–95	#14 Wake Forest	69–61
196	1994–95	#9 Wake Forest	83–68
197	1995–96	#12 Wake Forest	66–62
198	1995–96	#13 Wake Forest	72–70
199	1996–97	#2 Wake Forest	53–45
200	1996–97	NC State	60–59
201	1997–98	Wake Forest	68–62
202	1997–98	Wake Forest	71–57
203	1998–99	NC State	70–59
204	1998–99	Wake Forest	74–45
205	1998–99	NC State	66–52
206	1999–2000	NC State	76–56
207	1999–2000	Wake Forest	71–53
208	1999–2000	Wake Forest	69–52
209	2000–01	#16 Wake Forest	74–69
210	2000–01	#23 Wake Forest	76–58
211	2001–02	#24 Wake Forest	82–81
212	2001–02	#24 Wake Forest	83–71
213	2002–03	#14 Wake Forest	73–58
214	2002–03	#9 Wake Forest	78–72
215	2002–03	NC State	87–83
216	2003–04	NC State	73–68
217	2003–04	#16 NC State	81–70
218	2004–05	#6 Wake Forest	86–75
219	2004–05	#4 Wake Forest	55–53
220	2004–05	NC State	81–65
221	2005–06	#14 NC State	92–82
222	2005–06	Wake Forest	76–63
223	2005–06	Wake Forest	82–71
224	2006–07	NC State	88–74
225	2006–07	NC State	73–66
226	2007–08	NC State	67–65
227	2007–08	Wake Forest	78–67
228	2008–09	NC State	82–76
229	2008–09	#13 Wake Forest	85–78
230	2009–10	Wake Forest	67–59
231	2009–10	NC State	68–54
232	2010–11	NC State	90–69
233	2010–11	NC State	80–55
234	2011–12	NC State	76–40
235	2011–12	NC State	87–76
236	2012–13	Wake Forest	86–84
237	2012–13	NC State	81–66
238	2013–14	Wake Forest	70–69
239	2013–14	NC State	82–67
240	2014–15	NC State	78–65
241	2014–15	Wake Forest	88–84
242	2015–16	Wake Forest	77–74
243	2015–16	NC State	99–88
244	2015–16	NC State	75–72
245	2016–17	Wake Forest	93–88
246	2016–17	Wake Forest	88–58
247	2017–18	NC State	72–63
248	2017–18	NC State	90–84
249	2018–19	Wake Forest	71–67
250	2018–19	NC State	94–74
251	2019–20	NC State	91–82
252	2019–20	NC State	84–64
253	2020–21	NC State	72–67
254	2020–21	NC State	80–62
255	2021–22	Wake Forest	69–51
256	2021–22	Wake Forest	101–76
257	2022–23	NC State	79–77
258	2022–23	NC State	90–74
259	2023–24	NC State	83–76
260	2023–24	Wake Forest	83–79
261	2024–25	Wake Forest	77–59
262	2024–25	NC State	85–73
263	2025–26	NC State	70–57
264	2025–26	NC State	96–78
Series: NC State leads 154–110

== See also ==
- List of NCAA college football rivalry games
- List of most-played college football series in NCAA Division I
