= 2025 Gasparilla Bowl =

Postseason college football bowl game

2025 Union Home Mortgage Gasparilla Bowl
- 17th Gasparilla Bowl
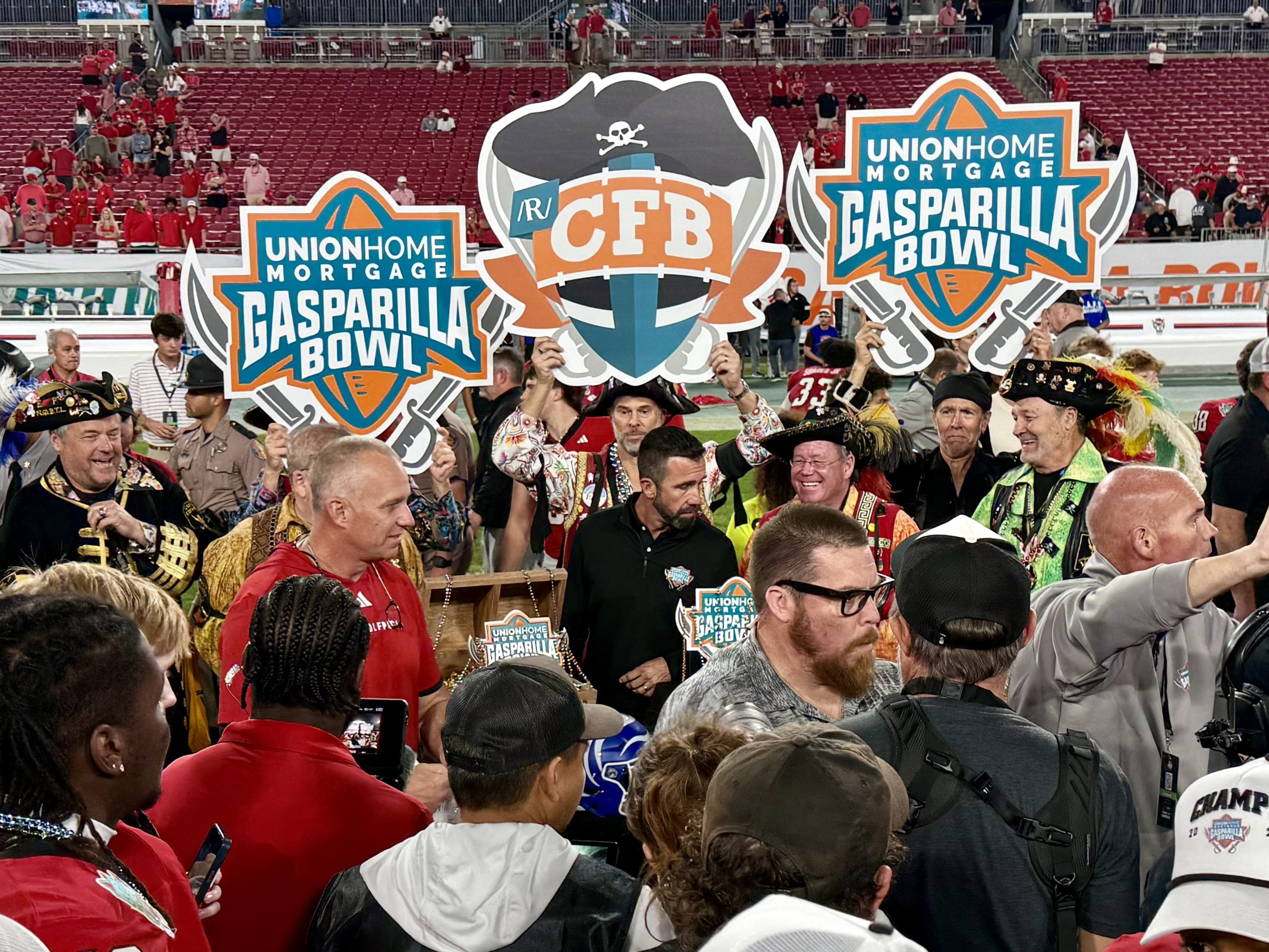
- Postgame award ceremony
Memphis Tigers	NC State Wolfpack
(8–4)	(7–5)
American	ACC
7	31
Head coach: Reggie Howard (interim)	Head coach: Dave Doeren
	1	2	3	4	Total
Memphis	0	7	0	0	7
NC State	14	17	0	0	31
- Date: December 19, 2025
- Season: 2025
- Stadium: Raymond James Stadium
- Location: Tampa, Florida
- MVP: Caden Fordham, LB, NC State
- Favorite: NC State by 3.5
- Referee: Nolan Dumas (Mountain West)
- Attendance: 13,336

United States TV coverage
- Network: ESPN
- Announcers: Anish Shroff (play-by-play), Andre Ware (analyst), and Paul Carcaterra (sideline)

The 2025 Gasparilla Bowl was a college football bowl game played on December 19, 2025, at Raymond James Stadium in Tampa, Florida. The 17th annual Gasparilla Bowl game began at 2:32 p.m. EST and aired on ESPN. The Gasparilla Bowl was one of the 2025–26 bowl games concluding the 2025 FBS football season. The game was sponsored by mortgage loan company Union Home Mortgage, and was officially known as the Union Home Mortgage Gasparilla Bowl.

The 2025 Gasparilla Bowl featured the Memphis Tigers (8–4) from the American Conference and the NC State Wolfpack (7–5) from the Atlantic Coast Conference. NC State beat Memphis by a score of 31–7.

== Teams ==
This was the first meeting between Memphis and NC State.

=== Memphis Tigers ===
Memphis opened their season with six consecutive wins. After a loss to UAB in mid-October, the Tigers won their next two games and had an 8–1 record at the end of October. They then lost their final three regular-season games to enter the Gasparilla Bowl with an 8–4 record.

For the bowl, Memphis was led by interim head coach Reggie Howard, appointed following the departure of Ryan Silverfield, who was hired by the Arkansas Razorbacks.

=== NC State Wolfpack ===
NC State opened their regular season with three consecutive wins. They then lost five of their next seven games and had a 5–5 record at mid-November. The Wolfpack won their final two regular-season games to enter the Gasparilla Bow with a 7–5 record.

== Game summary ==
2025 Union Home Mortgage Gasparilla Bowl

Quarter	1	2	3	4	Total
Memphis	0	7	0	0	7
NC State	14	17	0	0	31

at Raymond James Stadium • Tampa, Florida

- Date: Friday, December 19, 2025
- Game time: 2:30 p.m. EST
- Game weather: Sunny • Temperature: 77 °F (25 °C) • Wind: 10 mph (16 km/h) East
- Game attendance: 13,336
- Referee: Nolan Dumas
- TV announcers (ESPN): Anish Shroff (play-by-play), Andre Ware (analyst), and Paul Carcaterra (sideline)
- Box score

=== Statistics ===
Statistics	MEM	NCSU
First downs	17	17
Plays–yards	70–303	59–337
Rushes–yards	36–149	33–116
Passing yards	154	221
Passing: comp–att–int	20–34–1	14–26–0
Time of possession	33:38	26:36

Team	Category	Player	Statistics
Memphis	Passing	Brendon Lewis	14/25, 106 yards, TD, INT
Memphis	Rushing	Jamari Hawkins	9 carries, 65 yards
Memphis	Receiving	Khyair Spain	4 receptions, 32 yards, TD
NC State	Passing	CJ Bailey	14/25, 221 yards, 2 TD
NC State	Rushing	Jayden Scott	19 carries, 108 yards
NC State	Receiving	Wesley Grimes	3 receptions, 48 yards, TD
