= 2025 Memphis Tigers football team =

American college football season

2025 Memphis Tigers football

Gasparilla Bowl, L 7–31 vs. vs. NC State
- Conference: American Conference
- Record: 8–5 (4–4 American)
- Head coach: Ryan Silverfield (6th season; regular season); Reggie Howard (interim, bowl game)
- Offensive coordinator: Tim Cramsey (4th season)
- Co-offensive coordinator: Larry Smith (2nd season)
- Offensive scheme: Pro spread
- Defensive coordinator: Jordon Hankins (2nd season)
- Base defense: 4–3
- Home stadium: Simmons Bank Liberty Stadium

2025 American Conference football standings
	Conf.			Overall
Team	W		L	W		L
No. 18 Tulane y$^	7	–	1	11	–	3
No. 24 North Texas y	7	–	1	12	–	2
No. 23 Navy	7	–	1	11	–	2
South Florida	6	–	2	9	–	4
East Carolina	6	–	2	9	–	4
Memphis	4	–	4	8	–	5
Army	4	–	4	7	–	6
UTSA	4	–	4	7	–	6
Temple	3	–	5	5	–	7
Florida Atlantic	3	–	5	4	–	8
Rice	2	–	6	5	–	8
UAB	2	–	6	4	–	8
Tulsa	1	–	7	4	–	8
Charlotte	0	–	8	1	–	11
Championship: Tulane 34, North Texas 21
^ – College Football Playoff participant; $ – Conference champion; y – Championship game participant; Rankings from AP Poll

The 2025 Memphis Tigers football team represented the University of Memphis as a member of the American Conference during the 2025 NCAA Division I FBS football season. Led during the regular season by sixth-year head coach Ryan Silverfield, the Tigers played home games at Simmons Bank Liberty Stadium in Memphis, Tennessee.

For their bowl appearance, the team was led by interim head coach Reggie Howard, appointed following the departure of Silverfield, who was hired by the Arkansas Razorbacks.

== Schedule ==
Date	Time	Opponent	Rank	Site	TV	Result	Attendance
August 30	3:30 p.m.	Chattanooga*		Simmons Bank Liberty Stadium; Memphis, TN	ESPN+	W 45–10	25,011
September 6	6:00 p.m.	at Georgia State*		Center Parc Stadium; Atlanta, GA	ESPN+	W 38–16	13,625
September 13	11:00 a.m.	at Troy*		Veterans Memorial Stadium; Troy, AL	ESPNU	W 28–7	23,384
September 20	11:00 a.m.	Arkansas*		Simmons Bank Liberty Stadium; Memphis, TN	ABC	W 32–31	39,861
September 27	6:00 p.m.	at Florida Atlantic		Flagler Credit Union Stadium; Boca Raton, FL	ESPN2	W 55–26	17,733
October 4	7:00 p.m.	Tulsa		Simmons Bank Liberty Stadium; Memphis, TN	ESPNU	W 45–7	27,303
October 18	3:00 p.m.	at UAB	No. 22	Protective Stadium; Birmingham, AL (Battle for the Bones)	ESPN2	L 24–31	19,037
October 25	11:00 a.m.	No. 18 South Florida		Simmons Bank Liberty Stadium; Memphis, TN	ESPN2	W 34–31	30,940
October 31	6:00 p.m.	at Rice	No. 25	Rice Stadium; Houston, TX	ESPN2	W 38–14	20,197
November 7	8:00 p.m.	Tulane		Simmons Bank Liberty Stadium; Memphis, TN	ESPN	L 32–38	30,384
November 15	3:00 p.m.	at East Carolina		Dowdy–Ficklen Stadium; Greenville, NC	ESPNU	L 27–31	37,348
November 27	6:30 p.m.	Navy		Simmons Bank Liberty Stadium; Memphis, TN	ESPN	L 17–28	27,082
December 19	1:30 p.m.	NC State*		Raymond James Stadium; Tampa, FL (Gasparilla Bowl)	ESPN	L 7–31	13,336
*Non-conference game; Rankings from AP (and CFP Rankings, after November 4) - Released prior to game; All times are in Central time

== Rankings ==
Ranking movements Legend: ██ Increase in ranking ██ Decrease in ranking — = Not ranked RV = Received votes
	Week																
Poll	Pre	1	2	3	4	5	6	7	8	9	10	11	12	13	14	15	Final
AP	RV	RV	RV	—	RV	RV	23	22	—	25	22	RV	—	—	—	—	—
Coaches	RV	RV	RV	RV	RV	RV	25	20	RV	25	23	RV	—	—	—	—	—
CFP	Not released										—	—	—	—	—	—	Not released

== Game summaries ==
=== Chattanooga (FCS) ===
Chattanooga Mocs (FCS) (0–0) at Memphis Tigers (0–0) – Game summary

Quarter	1	2	3	4	Total
Mocs (FCS)	0	3	0	7	10
Tigers	14	14	10	7	45

at Simmons Bank Liberty Stadium • Memphis, TN

- Date: August 30
- Game time: 3:30 p.m. CDT
- Game weather: Sunny • Temperature: 89 °F (32 °C) • Wind: W at 2 miles per hour (3.2 km/h)
- Game attendance: 25,011
- Referee: Steven Arnold
- TV announcers (ESPN+): Chris Carlin (play-by-play) and Jay Sonnhalter (analyst)

Game information

First quarter

- (7:44) MEM – Greg Desrosiers Jr. 8-yard run, Gianni Spetic kick (Drive: 8 plays, 38 yards, 4:01; Memphis 7–0)
- (2:57) MEM – Sutton Smith 35-yard run, Gianni Spetic kick (Drive: 7 plays, 62 yards, 2:50; Memphis 14–0)

Second quarter

- (14:18) MEM – Brendon Lewis 22-yard run, Gianni Spetic kick (Drive: 6 plays, 63 yards, 1:57; Memphis 21–0)
- (9:20) UTC – Jude Kelley 32-yard field goal (Drive: 10 plays, 61 yards, 4:58; Memphis 21–3)
- (6:27) MEM – Cortez Braham Jr. 22-yard pass from Brendon Lewis, Gianni Spetic kick (Drive: 7 plays, 73 yards, 2:47; Memphis 28–3)

Third quarter

- (4:09) MEM – Gianni Spetic 37-yard field goal (Drive: 9 plays, 46 yards, 4:52; Memphis 31–3)
- (4:02) MEM – DeMarco Ward 27-yard interception return, Gianni Spetic kick (Memphis 38–3)

Fourth quarter

- (12:50) UTC – Josh Williams 3-yard pass from Camden Orth, Jude Kelley kick (Drive: 12 plays, 75 yards, 6:12; Memphis 38–10)
- (2:00) MEM – Frank Peasant 12-yard run, Gianni Spetic kick (Drive: 9 plays, 76 yards, 5:02; Memphis 45–10)

Statistics	UTC	MEM
First downs	14	24
Plays–yards	56–232	61–432
Rushes–yards	37–118	33–233
Passing yards	114	199
Passing: comp–att–int	12–19–2	22–28–1
Turnovers	2	1
Time of possession	31:33	28:27

Team	Category	Player	Statistics
Chattanooga	Passing	Camden Orth	12/19, 114 yards, TD, 2 INT
Chattanooga	Rushing	Ryan Ingram	8 carries, 68 yards
Chattanooga	Receiving	Markell Quick	4 receptions, 40 yards
Memphis	Passing	Brendon Lewis	22/28, 199 yards, TD, INT
Memphis	Rushing	Brendon Lewis	10 carries, 81 yards, TD
Memphis	Receiving	Cortez Braham Jr.	3 receptions, 52 yards, TD

=== at Georgia State ===
Memphis Tigers (1–0) at Georgia State Panthers (0–1) – Game summary

Quarter	1	2	3	4	Total
Tigers	7	10	14	7	38
Panthers	9	7	0	0	16

at Center Parc Stadium • Atlanta, GA

- Date: September 6
- Game time: 6:00 p.m. CDT
- Game weather: Cloudy • Temperature: 75 °F (24 °C) • Wind: SE at 6 miles per hour (9.7 km/h)
- Game attendance: 13,625
- Referee: Edwin Lee
- TV announcers (ESPN+): Matt Stewart (play-by-play) and Sam Crenshaw (analyst)

Game information

First quarter

- (9:07) MEM – Sutton Smith 16-yard run, Gianni Spetic kick (Drive: 2 plays, 66 yards, 0:35; Memphis 7–0)
- (3:22) GAST – Team safety (Memphis 7–2)
- (0:17) GAST – Cameran Brown 22-yard run, Liam Rickman kick (Drive: 7 plays, 63 yards, 3:01; Georgia State 9–7)

Second quarter

- (5:34) MEM – Makari Bodiford 7-yard run, Gianni Spetic kick (Drive: 10 plays, 75 yards, 5:45; Memphis 14–9)
- (2:40) GAST – Javon Robinson 44-yard pass from Cameran Brown, Braeden McAlister kick (Drive: 8 plays, 75 yards, 2:54; Georgia State 16–14)
- (0:00) MEM – Gianni Spetic 55-yard field goal (Drive: 4 plays, 18 yards, 0:20; Memphis 17–16)

Third quarter

- (10:08) MEM – Brendon Lewis 5-yard run, Gianni Spetic kick (Drive: 10 plays, 75 yards, 4:52; Memphis 24–16)
- (0:15) MEM – Makari Bodiford 1-yard run, Gianni Spetic kick (Drive: 10 plays, 51 yards, 5:58; Memphis 31–16)

Fourth quarter

- (0:11) MEM – DeMarco Ward 31-yard interception return, Gianni Spetic kick (Memphis 38–16)

Statistics	MEM	GAST
First downs	21	19
Plays–yards	60–401	68–389
Rushes–yards	40–205	27–49
Passing yards	196	340
Passing: comp–att–int	16–20–0	29–41–1
Turnovers	0	1
Time of possession	29:53	30:07

Team	Category	Player	Statistics
Memphis	Passing	Brendon Lewis	16/20, 196 yards
Memphis	Rushing	Sutton Smith	14 carries, 74 yards, TD
Memphis	Receiving	Jamari Hawkins	3 receptions, 79 yards
Georgia State	Passing	T. J. Finley	21/29, 201 yards, INT
Georgia State	Rushing	Cameran Brown	3 carries, 25 yards, TD
Georgia State	Receiving	Ted Hurst	7 receptions, 97 yards

=== at Troy ===
Memphis Tigers (2–0) at Troy Trojans (1–1) – Game summary

Quarter	1	2	3	4	Total
Tigers	7	14	0	7	28
Trojans	0	7	0	0	7

at Veterans Memorial Stadium • Troy, AL

- Date: September 13
- Game time: 11:00 a.m. CDT
- Game weather: Sunny • Temperature: 83 °F (28 °C) • Wind: NE at 7 miles per hour (11 km/h)
- Game attendance: 23,384
- Referee: Charles Lamertina
- TV announcers (ESPNU): Courtney Lyle (play-by-play) and Rene Ingoglia (analyst)

Game information

First quarter

- (10:34) MEM – Sutton Smith 5-yard run, Gianni Spetic kick (Drive: 8 plays, 65 yards, 4:26; Memphis 7–0)

Second quarter

- (12:02) TROY – Taleeq Robbins 15-yard fumble recovery, Scott Taylor Renfroe kick (Tied 7–7)
- (8:21) MEM – Brady Kluse 18-yard pass from Brendon Lewis, Gianni Spetic kick (Drive: 7 plays, 75 yards, 3:41; Memphis 14–7)
- (1:45) MEM – Sutton Smith 50-yard run, Gianni Spetic kick (Drive: 1 play, 50 yards, 0:10; Memphis 21–7)

Third quarter

- No scoring plays.

Fourth quarter

- (3:49) MEM – Makari Bodiford 8-yard run, Gianni Spetic kick (Drive: 8 plays, 58 yards, 5:03; Memphis 28–7)

Statistics	MEM	TROY
First downs	22	12
Plays–yards	72–430	55–112
Rushes–yards	45–217	23–40
Passing yards	213	72
Passing: comp–att–int	17–27–0	12–32–1
Turnovers	1	1
Time of possession	36:55	23:05

Team	Category	Player	Statistics
Memphis	Passing	Brendon Lewis	17/27, 213 yards, TD
Memphis	Rushing	Sutton Smith	18 carries, 113 yards, 2 TD
Memphis	Receiving	Cortez Braham Jr.	4 receptions, 69 yards
Troy	Passing	Tucker Kilcrease	10/29, 65 yards, INT
Troy	Rushing	Jordan Lovett	8 carries, 50 yards
Troy	Receiving	Roman Mothershed	8 receptions, 58 yards

=== Arkansas ===
Arkansas Razorbacks (2–1) at Memphis Tigers (3–0) – Game summary

Quarter	1	2	3	4	Total
Razorbacks	7	21	3	0	31
Tigers	10	7	9	6	32

at Simmons Bank Liberty Stadium • Memphis, TN

- Date: September 20
- Game time: 11:00 a.m. CDT
- Game weather: Sunny • Temperature: 82 °F (28 °C) • Wind: N at 0 miles per hour (0 km/h)
- Game attendance: 39,861
- Referee: Tim Rich
- TV announcers (ABC): Joe Tessitore (play-by-play), Jesse Palmer (analyst) and Katie George (sideline)

Game information

First quarter

- (13:50) ARK – Rohan Jones 62-yard pass from Taylen Green, Scott Starzyk kick (Drive: 3 plays, 75 yards, 1:10; Arkansas 7–0)
- (8:57) MEM – Gianni Spetic 38-yard field goal (Drive: 13 plays, 55 yards, 4:53; Arkansas 7–3)
- (0:20) MEM – Brendon Lewis 4-yard run, Gianni Spetic kick (Drive: 11 plays, 71 yards, 6:02; Memphis 10–7)

Second quarter

- (12:37) ARK – Braylen Russell 16-yard run, Scott Starzyk kick (Drive: 6 plays, 77 yards, 2:43; Arkansas 14–10)
- (7:41) ARK – Rohan Jones 5-yard run, Scott Starzyk kick (Drive: 7 plays, 66 yards, 3:27; Arkansas 21–10)
- (1:35) ARK – Mike Washington Jr. 1-yard run, Scott Starzyk kick (Drive: 4 plays, 52 yards, 0:54; Arkansas 28–10)
- (0:31) MEM – Cortez Braham Jr. 38-yard pass from Brendon Lewis, Gianni Spetic kick (Drive: 6 plays, 75 yards, 1:04; Arkansas 28–17)

Third quarter

- (7:25) MEM – Gianni Spetic 47-yard field goal (Drive: 6 plays, 30 yards, 3:17; Arkansas 28–20)
- (4:16) ARK – Scott Starzyk 46-yard field goal (Drive: 8 plays, 47 yards, 3:09; Arkansas 31–20)
- (1:40) MEM – Brendon Lewis 10-yard run, pass failed (Drive: 5 plays, 75 yards, 2:36; Arkansas 31–26)

Fourth quarter

- (4:51) MEM – Sutton Smith 64-yard run, pass failed (Drive: 4 plays, 94 yards, 1:35; Memphis 32–31)

Statistics	ARK	MEM
First downs	23	26
Plays–yards	66–500	72–489
Rushes–yards	32–175	41–290
Passing yards	325	199
Passing: comp–att–int	18–34–2	15–31–2
Turnovers	3	2
Time of possession	27:55	32:05

Team	Category	Player	Statistics
Arkansas	Passing	Taylen Green	18/34, 325 yards, TD, 2 INT
Arkansas	Rushing	Mike Washington Jr.	15 carries, 70 yards, TD
Arkansas	Receiving	Rohan Jones	2 receptions, 102 yards, TD
Memphis	Passing	Brendon Lewis	15/30, 199 yards, TD, INT
Memphis	Rushing	Sutton Smith	12 carries, 147 yards, TD
Memphis	Receiving	Cortez Braham Jr.	7 receptions, 102 yards, TD

=== at Florida Atlantic ===
Memphis Tigers (4–0) at Florida Atlantic Owls (1–2) – Game summary

Quarter	1	2	3	4	Total
Tigers	10	7	7	31	55
Owls	7	9	3	7	26

at Flagler Credit Union Stadium • Boca Raton, FL

- Date: September 27
- Game time: 6:00 p.m. CDT
- Game weather: Cloudy • Temperature: 89 °F (32 °C) • Wind: NE at 16 miles per hour (26 km/h)
- Game attendance: 17,733
- Referee: Matt Overton
- TV announcers (ESPN2): Jay Alter (play-by-play), Rocky Boiman (analyst) and Tori Petry (sideline)

Game information

First quarter

- (12:42) MEM – Brendon Lewis 18-yard run, Gianni Spetic kick (Drive: 4 plays, 75 yards, 2:18; Memphis 7–0)
- (9:10) FAU – Caden Veltkamp 1-yard run, Garrison Smith kick (Drive: 10 plays, 75 yards, 3:32; Tied 7–7)
- (3:08) MEM – Gianni Spetic 52-yard field goal (Drive: 10 plays, 41 yards, 6:02; Memphis 10–7)

Second quarter

- (9:44) FAU – Jayshon Platt 10-yard run, pass failed (Drive: 13 plays, 56 yards, 5:37; Florida Atlantic 13–10)
- (2:18) FAU – Garrison Smith 27-yard field goal (Drive: 9 plays, 45 yards, 2:42; Florida Atlantic 16–10)
- (0:22) MEM – Greg Desrosiers Jr. 2-yard run, Gianni Spetic kick (Drive: 10 plays, 75 yards, 1:56; Memphis 17–16)

Third quarter

- (9:57) MEM – Greg Desrosiers Jr. 90-yard run, Gianni Spetic kick (Drive: 3 plays, 99 yards, 1:34; Memphis 24–16)
- (4:29) FAU – Garrison Smith 29-yard field goal (Drive: 7 plays, 67 yards, 1:52; Memphis 24–19)

Fourth quarter

- (14:55) MEM – Cortez Braham Jr. 18-yard pass from Brendon Lewis, Gianni Spetic kick (Drive: 9 plays, 65 yards, 4:34; Memphis 31–19)
- (10:20) FAU – Xavier Terrell 1-yard run, Garrison Smith kick (Drive: 6 plays, 19 yards, 1:59; Memphis 31–26)
- (9:32) MEM – Cortez Braham Jr. 73-yard pass from Brendon Lewis, Gianni Spetic kick (Drive: 2 plays, 75 yards, 0:48; Memphis 38–26)
- (4:54) MEM – Gianni Spetic 25-yard field goal (Drive: 6 plays, 17 yards, 3:17; Memphis 41–26)
- (2:02) MEM – Greg Desrosiers Jr. 1-yard run, Gianni Spetic kick (Drive: 3 plays, 48 yards, 1:05; Memphis 48–26)
- (1:04) MEM – Brendon Lewis 15-yard run, Gianni Spetic kick (Drive: 2 plays, 15 yards, 0:51; Memphis 55–26)

Statistics	MEM	FAU
First downs	24	19
Plays–yards	65–487	80–397
Rushes–yards	46–291	29–75
Passing yards	196	322
Passing: comp–att–int	13–19–0	32–51–0
Turnovers	1	1
Time of possession	31:05	28:55

Team	Category	Player	Statistics
Memphis	Passing	Brendon Lewis	13/19, 196 yards, 2 TD
Memphis	Rushing	Greg Desrosiers Jr.	19 carries, 204 yards, 3 TD
Memphis	Receiving	Cortez Braham Jr.	6 receptions, 127 yards, 2 TD
Florida Atlantic	Passing	Caden Veltkamp	31/50, 318 yards
Florida Atlantic	Rushing	Caden Veltkamp	8 carries, 28 yards, TD
Florida Atlantic	Receiving	Easton Messer	9 receptions, 131 yards

=== Tulsa ===
Tulsa Golden Hurricane (2–3) at Memphis Tigers (5–0) – Game summary

Quarter	1	2	3	4	Total
Golden Hurricane	0	7	0	0	7
Tigers	7	21	10	7	45

at Simmons Bank Liberty Stadium • Memphis, TN

- Date: October 4
- Game time: 7:00 p.m. CDT
- Game weather: Clear • Temperature: 78 °F (26 °C) • Wind: E at 8 miles per hour (13 km/h)
- Game attendance: 27,303
- Referee: Kevin Randall
- TV announcers (ESPNU): Jay Alter (play-by-play) and Rocky Boiman (analyst)

Game information

First quarter

- (8:00) MEM – Matt Adcock 7-yard pass from Brendon Lewis, Gianni Spetic kick (Drive: 11 plays, 64 yards, 5:55; Memphis 7–0)

Second quarter

- (11:14) MEM – Sutton Smith 3-yard run, Gianni Spetic kick (Drive: 6 plays, 80 yards, 3:05; Memphis 14–0)
- (7:46) TLSA – Micah Tease 34-yard pass from Kirk Francis, Seth Morgan kick (Drive: 10 plays, 80 yards, 3:23; Memphis 14–7)
- (2:04) MEM – Cortez Braham Jr. 14-yard pass from Brendon Lewis, Gianni Spetic kick (Drive: 2 plays, 20 yards, 0:25; Memphis 21–7)
- (1:07) MEM – Brendon Lewis 4-yard run, Gianni Spetic kick (Drive: 5 plays, 27 yards, 0:38; Memphis 28–7)

Third quarter

- (9:53) MEM – Gianni Spetic 50-yard field goal (Drive: 11 plays, 52 yards, 5:04; Memphis 31–7)
- (0:53) MEM – Greg Desrosiers Jr. 2-yard pass from Brendon Lewis, Gianni Spetic kick (Drive: 6 plays, 36 yards, 3:14; Memphis 38–7)

Fourth quarter

- (4:50) MEM – Frank Peasant 10-yard run, Gianni Spetic kick (Drive: 4 plays, 38 yards, 1:57; Memphis 45–7)

Statistics	TLSA	MEM
First downs	15	28
Plays–yards	58–246	78–457
Rushes–yards	24–71	48–191
Passing yards	175	266
Passing: comp–att–int	20–34–3	22–30–2
Turnovers	4	2
Time of possession	20:49	39:11

Team	Category	Player	Statistics
Tulsa	Passing	Kirk Francis	20/34, 175 yards, TD, 3 INT
Tulsa	Rushing	Dominic Richardson	14 carries, 48 yards
Tulsa	Receiving	Micah Tease	2 receptions, 57 yards, TD
Memphis	Passing	Brendon Lewis	22/30, 266 yards, 3 TD, 2 INT
Memphis	Rushing	Brendon Lewis	14 carries, 67 yards, TD
Memphis	Receiving	Jamari Hawkins	7 receptions, 110 yards

=== at UAB (Battle for the Bones) ===
No. 22 Memphis Tigers (6–0) at UAB Blazers (2–4) – Game summary

Quarter	1	2	3	4	Total
No. 22 Tigers	7	7	3	7	24
Blazers	7	10	7	7	31

at Protective Stadium • Birmingham, AL

- Date: October 18
- Game time: 3:00 p.m. CDT
- Game weather: Sunny
- Game attendance: 19,037
- Referee: Edwin Lee
- TV announcers (ESPN2): Matt Schumacker (play-by-play), Dustin Fox (analyst), and Tori Petry (sideline)

Game information

First quarter

- (9:56) UAB – Iverson Hooks 15-yard pass from Ryder Burton, Jonah Delange kick (Drive: 10 plays, 75 yards, 5:04; UAB 7–0)
- (9:42) MEM – Sutton Smith 99-yard kickoff return, Gianni Spetic kick (Tied 7–7)

Second quarter

- (7:08) UAB – Jonah Delange 21-yard field goal (Drive: 15 plays, 57 yards, 8:35; UAB 10–7)
- (1:12) MEM – Greg Desrosiers Jr. 1-yard run, Gianni Spetic kick (Drive: 12 plays, 75 yards, 5:56; Memphis 14–10)
- (0:02) UAB – Iverson Hooks 16-yard pass from Ryder Burton, Jonah Delange kick (Drive: 7 plays, 75 yards, 1:10; UAB 17–14)

Third quarter

- (10:33) UAB – Solomon Beebe 81-yard run, Jonah Delange kick (Drive: 2 plays, 79 yards, 0:50; UAB 24–14)
- (3:14) MEM – Gianni Spetic 25-yard field goal (Drive: 14 plays, 68 yards, 7:19; UAB 24–17)

Fourth quarter

- (4:06) UAB – Iverson Hooks 20-yard pass from Ryder Burton, Jonah Delange kick (Drive: 11 plays, 99 yards, 6:40; UAB 31–17)
- (2:19) MEM – Christian Ross 37-yard pass from AJ Hill, Gianni Spetic kick (Drive: 8 plays, 68 yards, 1:45; UAB 31–24)

Statistics	MEM	UAB
First downs	20	25
Plays–yards	60–362	68–470
Rushes–yards	25–119	41–219
Passing yards	243	251
Passing: comp–att–int	22–35–1	20–27–1
Turnovers	1	2
Time of possession	24:55	35:05

Team	Category	Player	Statistics
Memphis	Passing	AJ Hill	13/25, 175 yards, TD, INT
Memphis	Rushing	Greg Desrosiers Jr.	11 carries, 74 yards, TD
Memphis	Receiving	Cortez Braham Jr.	5 receptions, 83 yards
UAB	Passing	Ryder Burton	20/27, 251 yards, 3 TD, INT
UAB	Rushing	Solomon Beebe	5 carries, 106 yards, TD
UAB	Receiving	Iverson Hooks	11 receptions, 172 yards, 3 TD

=== No. 18 South Florida ===
No. 18 South Florida Bulls (6–1) at Memphis Tigers (6–1) – Game summary

Quarter	1	2	3	4	Total
No. 18 Bulls	14	10	7	0	31
Tigers	7	7	3	17	34

at Simmons Bank Liberty Stadium • Memphis, TN

- Date: October 25
- Game time: 11:00 a.m. CDT
- Game weather: Cloudy • Temperature: 65 °F (18 °C) • Wind: SE at 11 miles per hour (18 km/h)
- Game attendance: 30,940
- Referee: Charles Lamertina
- TV announcers (ESPN2): Matt Schumacker (play-by-play), Sam Acho (analyst), and Taylor Davis (sideline)

Game information

First quarter

- (13:03) MEM – Frank Peasant 19-yard run, Gianni Spetic kick (Drive: 3 plays, 28 yards, 0:55; Memphis 7–0)
- (8:31) USF – Byrum Brown 3-yard run, Nico Gramatica kick (Drive: 12 plays, 75 yards, 4:32; Tied 7–7)
- (1:10) USF – Byrum Brown 44-yard run, Nico Gramatica kick (Drive: 7 plays, 92 yards, 2:45; South Florida 14–7)

Second quarter

- (4:21) USF – Jeremiah Koger 5-yard pass from Byrum Brown, Nico Gramatica kick (Drive: 8 plays, 92 yards, 2:44; South Florida 21–7)
- (0:50) MEM – Cortez Braham Jr. 5-yard pass from Brendon Lewis, Gianni Spetic kick (Drive: 11 plays, 75 yards, 3:31; South Florida 21–14)
- (0:00) USF – Nico Gramatica 46-yard field goal (Drive: 8 plays, 47 yards, 0:50; South Florida 24–14)

Third quarter

- (9:51) MEM – Gianni Spetic 55-yard field goal (Drive: 10 plays, 38 yards, 5:09; South Florida 24–17)
- (0:02) USF – Sam Franklin 73-yard run, Nico Gramatica kick (Drive: 1 play, 73 yards, 0:12; South Florida 31–17)

Fourth quarter

- (13:13) MEM – Greg Desrosiers Jr. 13-yard run (Drive: 8 plays, 75 yards, 1:49; South Florida 31–23)
- (7:08) MEM – Gianni Spetic 28-yard field goal (Drive: 9 plays, 81 yards, 3:57; South Florida 31–26)
- (1:07) MEM – Cortez Braham Jr. 10-yard pass from Brendon Lewis, Brendon Lewis rush (Drive: 11 plays, 70 yards, 3:51; Memphis 34–31)

Statistics	USF	MEM
First downs	29	30
Plays–yards	82–564	79–450
Rushes–yards	38–295	34–129
Passing yards	269	321
Passing: comp–att–int	26–44–1	28–45–0
Turnovers	1	0
Time of possession	26:08	33:52

Team	Category	Player	Statistics
South Florida	Passing	Byrum Brown	26/43, 269 yards, TD, INT
South Florida	Rushing	Byrum Brown	21 carries, 121 yards, 2 TD
South Florida	Receiving	Keshaun Singleton	7 receptions, 88 yards
Memphis	Passing	Brendon Lewis	27/44, 307 yards, 2 TD
Memphis	Rushing	Brendon Lewis	11 carries, 35 yards
Memphis	Receiving	Jamari Hawkins	3 receptions, 85 yards

=== at Rice ===
No. 25 Memphis Tigers (7–1) at Rice Owls (4–4) – Game summary

Quarter	1	2	3	4	Total
No. 25 Tigers	14	17	7	0	38
Owls	0	7	0	7	14

at Rice Stadium • Houston, TX

- Date: October 31
- Game time: 6:00 p.m. CDT
- Game weather: Clear • Temperature: 71 °F (22 °C) • Wind: NW at 9 miles per hour (14 km/h)
- Game attendance: 20,197
- Referee: Matt Overton
- TV announcers (ESPN2): Ted Emrich (play-by-play), Dustin Fox (analyst), and Marilyn Payne (sideline)

Game information

First quarter

- (10:35) MEM – Brendon Lewis 18-yard run, Gianni Spetic kick (Drive: 5 plays, 54 yards, 2:28; Memphis 7–0)
- (2:34) MEM – Frank Peasant 2-yard run, Gianni Spetic kick (Drive: 3 plays, 7 yards, 1:16; Memphis 14–0)

Second quarter

- (12:25) MEM – Frank Peasant 1-yard run, Gianni Spetic kick (Drive: 6 plays, 51 yards, 3:07; Memphis 21–0)
- (7:54) MEM – Frank Peasant 1-yard run, Gianni Spetic kick (Drive: 6 plays, 86 yards, 2:39; Memphis 28–0)
- (2:03) RICE – Aaron Turner 12-yard pass from Chase Jenkins, Enock Gota kick (Drive: 12 plays, 78 yards, 5:49; Memphis 28–7)
- (0:00) MEM – Gianni Spetic 37-yard field goal (Drive: 9 plays, 56 yards, 2:03; Memphis 31–7)

Third quarter

- (0:49) MEM – Greg Desrosiers Jr. 2-yard run, Gianni Spetic kick (Drive: 4 plays, 27 yards, 1:09; Memphis 38–7)

Fourth quarter

- (3:28) RICE – Tyvonn Byars 1-yard run, Chase Allen kick (Drive: 12 plays, 76 yards, 6:19; Memphis 38–14)

Statistics	MEM	RICE
First downs	20	13
Plays–yards	56–355	63–212
Rushes–yards	33–130	46–112
Passing yards	225	100
Passing: comp–att–int	18–23–0	11–17–1
Turnovers	0	2
Time of possession	27:38	32:22

Team	Category	Player	Statistics
Memphis	Passing	Brendon Lewis	18/22, 225 yards
Memphis	Rushing	Brendon Lewis	12 carries, 87 yards, TD
Memphis	Receiving	Cortez Braham Jr.	3 receptions, 66 yards
Rice	Passing	Chase Jenkins	11/16, 100 yards, TD, INT
Rice	Rushing	Chase Jenkins	15 carries, 34 yards
Rice	Receiving	Tyvonn Byars	1 reception, 43 yards

=== Tulane ===
Tulane Green Wave (6–2) at Memphis Tigers (8–1) – Game summary

Quarter	1	2	3	4	Total
Green Wave	14	21	3	0	38
Tigers	7	10	0	15	32

at Simmons Bank Liberty Stadium • Memphis, TN

- Date: November 7
- Game time: 8:00 p.m. CST
- Game weather: Cloudy • Temperature: 64 °F (18 °C) • Wind: S at 3 miles per hour (4.8 km/h)
- Game attendance: 30,384
- Referee: Tim Rich
- TV announcers (ESPN): Anish Shroff (play-by-play), Andre Ware (analyst), and Paul Carcaterra (sideline)

Game information

First quarter

- (12:33) TULN – Shazz Preston 65-yard pass from Jake Retzlaff, Patrick Durkin kick (Drive: 1 play, 65 yards, 0:09; Tulane 7–0)
- (10:38) MEM – Jamari Hawkins 55-yard pass from Brendon Lewis, Gianni Spetic kick (Drive: 5 plays, 75 yards, 1:55; Tied 7–7)
- (4:58) TULN – Javin Gordon 5-yard run, Patrick Durkin kick (Drive: 10 plays, 75 yards, 5:40; Tulane 14–7)

Second quarter

- (14:55) MEM – Arrington Maiden 21-yard run, Gianni Spetic kick (Drive: 5 plays, 66 yards, 1:51; Tied 14–14)
- (12:02) TULN – Jake Retzlaff 33-yard run, Patrick Durkin kick (Drive: 6 plays, 75 yards, 2:53; Tulane 21–14)
- (9:26) TULN – Anthony Brown-Stephens 54-yard pass from Jake Retzlaff, Patrick Durkin kick (Drive: 3 plays, 65 yards, 1:19; Tulane 28–14)
- (4:27) MEM – Gianni Spetic 49-yard field goal (Drive: 10 plays, 44 yards, 4:59; Tulane 28–17)
- (0:43) TULN – Shazz Preston 5-yard pass from Jake Retzlaff, Patrick Durkin kick (Drive: 10 plays, 75 yards, 3:44; Tulane 35–17)

Third quarter

- (11:51) TULN – Patrick Durkin 30-yard field goal (Drive: 6 plays, 63 yards, 3:09; Tulane 38–17)

Fourth quarter

- (14:57) MEM – Frank Peasant 1-yard run, Matt Adcock pass (Drive: 12 plays, 77 yards, 6:44; Tulane 38–25)
- (7:49) MEM – Brady Kluse 25-yard pass from Brendon Lewis, Gianni Spetic kick (Drive: 10 plays, 81 yards, 6:04; Tulane 38–32)

Statistics	TULN	MEM
First downs	17	23
Plays–yards	56–457	69–435
Rushes–yards	32–125	29–67
Passing yards	332	368
Passing: comp–att–int	16–24–0	33–40–1
Turnovers	0	1
Time of possession	25:32	34:28

Team	Category	Player	Statistics
Tulane	Passing	Jake Retzlaff	16/23, 332 yards, 3 TD
Tulane	Rushing	Javin Gordon	12 carries, 66 yards, TD
Tulane	Receiving	Bryce Bohanon	4 receptions, 101 yards
Memphis	Passing	Brendon Lewis	29/34, 317 yards, 2 TD, INT
Memphis	Rushing	Greg Desrosiers Jr.	8 carries, 35 yards
Memphis	Receiving	Cortez Braham Jr.	11 receptions, 113 yards

=== at East Carolina ===
Memphis Tigers (8–2) at East Carolina Pirates (6–3) – Game summary

Quarter	1	2	3	4	Total
Tigers	0	17	7	3	27
Pirates	7	3	14	7	31

at Dowdy–Ficklen Stadium • Greenville, NC

- Date: November 15
- Game time: 3:00 p.m. CST
- Game weather: Sunny • Temperature: 72 °F (22 °C) • Wind: SW at 11 miles per hour (18 km/h)
- Game attendance: 37,348
- Referee: Kevin Randall
- TV announcers (ESPNU): Matt Schumacker (play-by-play) and Dustin Fox (analyst)

Game information

First quarter

- ECU – London Montgomery 1-yard run (Nick Mazzie kick), 2:36. Pirates 7–0. Drive: 12 plays, 91 yards, 4:10.

Second quarter

- MEM – Matt Adcock 5-yard pass from Brendon Lewis (Gianni Spetic kick), 12:50. Tied 7–7. Drive: 10 plays, 75 yards, 4:46.
- MEM – Sutton Smith 84-yard run (Gianni Spetic kick), 5:30. Tigers 14–7. Drive: 1 play, 84 yards, 0:13.
- ECU – Nick Mazzie 49-yard field goal, 2:19. Tigers 14–10. Drive: 10 plays, 44 yards, 3:12.
- MEM – Gianni Spetic 44-yard field goal, 0:22. Tigers 17–10. Drive: 10 plays, 49 yards, 1:57.

Third quarter

- ECU – Katin Houser 1-yard run (Nick Mazzie kick), 11:59. Tied 17–17. Drive: 7 plays, 74 yards, 2:02.
- MEM – Brendon Lewis 7-yard run (Gianni Spetic kick), 7:36. Tigers 24–17. Drive: 8 plays, 68 yards, 4:23.
- ECU – London Montgomery 23-yard run (Nick Mazzie kick), 5:46. Tied 24–24. Drive: 6 plays, 75 yards, 1:50.

Fourth quarter

- MEM – Gianni Spetic 30-yard field goal, 2:29. Tigers 27–24. Drive: 6 plays, 12 yards, 1:41.
- ECU – Payton Mangrum 31-yard pass from Katin Houser (Nick Mazzie kick), 1:08. Pirates 31–27. Drive: 6 plays, 75 yards, 1:21.

Statistics	MEM	ECU
First downs	24	24
Plays–yards	77–457	72–454
Rushes–yards	33–240	38–122
Passing yards	217	332
Passing: comp–att–int	33–44–1	23–34–0
Turnovers	1	1
Time of possession	35:33	24:27

Team	Category	Player	Statistics
Memphis	Passing	Brendon Lewis	32/43, 209 yards, TD, INT
Memphis	Rushing	Sutton Smith	7 carries, 109 yards, TD
Memphis	Receiving	Cortez Branham Jr.	9 receptions, 79 yards
East Carolina	Passing	Katin Houser	23/34, 332 yards, TD
East Carolina	Rushing	London Montgomery	27 carries, 103 yards, 2 TD
East Carolina	Receiving	Brock Spalding	5 receptions, 88 yards

=== Navy ===
Navy Midshipmen (8–2) at Memphis Tigers (8–3) – Game summary

Quarter	1	2	3	4	Total
Midshipmen	0	14	7	7	28
Tigers	3	14	0	0	17

at Simmons Bank Liberty Stadium • Memphis, TN

- Date: November 27
- Game time: 6:30 p.m. CST
- Game weather: Clear • Temperature: 42 °F (6 °C) • Wind: NE at 2 miles per hour (3.2 km/h)
- Game attendance: 27,082
- Referee: Charles Lamertina
- TV announcers (ESPN): Matt Barrie (play-by-play), Tom Luginbill (analyst) and Harry Lyles Jr. (sideline)

Game information

First quarter

- (5:35) MEM – Gianni Spetic 31-yard field goal (Drive: 11 plays, 46 yards, 6:26, Memphis 3–0)

Second quarter

- (12:11) NAVY – Kendall Evans 3-yard pass from Blake Horvath, Nathan Kirkwood kick (Drive: 7 plays, 57 yards, 3:20, Navy 7–3)
- (7:28) MEM – Matt Adcock 1-yard pass from Brendon Lewis, Gianni Spetic kick (Drive: 10 plays, 75 yards, 4:37, Memphis 10–7)
- (5:13) NAVY – Alex Tecza 2-yard run, Nathan Kirkwood kick (Drive: 6 plays, 72 yards, 2:10, Navy 14–10)
- (1:43) MEM – Cortez Braham Jr. 38-yard pass from Brendon Lewis, Gianni Spetic kick (Drive: 8 plays, 77 yards, 3:24, Memphis 17–14)

Third quarter

- (1:01) NAVY – Alex Tecza 12-yard run, Nathan Kirkwood kick (Drive: 5 plays, 44 yards, 2:24, Navy 21–17)

Fourth quarter

- (5:53) NAVY – Blake Horvath 2-yard run, Nathan Kirkwood kick (Drive: 13 plays, 73 yards, 8:19, Navy 28–17)

Statistics	NAVY	MEM
First downs	21	18
Plays–yards	69–300	65–288
Rushes–yards	60–200	29–116
Passing yards	100	172
Passing: comp–att–int	5–9–0	19–36–0
Turnovers	1	0
Time of possession	35:29	24:31

Team	Category	Player	Statistics
Navy	Passing	Blake Horvath	5/9, 100 yards, TD
Navy	Rushing	Alex Tecza	26 carries, 103 yards, 2 TD
Navy	Receiving	Eli Heidenreich	2 receptions, 64 yards
Memphis	Passing	Brendon Lewis	19/36, 172 yards, 2 TD
Memphis	Rushing	Brendon Lewis	10 carries, 36 yards
Memphis	Receiving	Cortez Braham Jr.	4 receptions, 65 yards, TD

=== vs. NC State (Gasparilla Bowl) ===
2025 Union Home Mortgage Gasparilla Bowl
Memphis Tigers (8–4) vs. NC State Wolfpack (7-5) – Game summary

Quarter	1	2	3	4	Total
Tigers	0	7	0	0	7
Wolfpack	17	14	0	0	31

at Raymond James Stadium • Tampa, FL

- Date: December 19
- Game time: 1:30 p.m. CST
- Game weather: Sunny • Temperature: 77 °F (25 °C) • Wind: E at 10 mph (16 km/h)
- Game attendance: 13,336
- Referee: Nolan Dumas
- TV announcers (ESPN): Anish Shroff (play-by-play), Andre Ware (analyst) and Paul Carcaterra (sideline)

Game information

First quarter

- NCSU – CJ Bailey 14-yard run (Kanoah Vinesett kick), 11:32. Wolfpack 7–0. Drive: 7 plays, 75 yards, 3:28.
- NCSU – Wesley Grimes 31-yard pass from CJ Bailey (Kanoah Vinesett kick), 3:21. Wolfpack 14–0. Drive: 4 plays, 67 yards, 0:55.

Second quarter

- NCSU – Will Wilson 1-yard run (Kanoah Vinesett kick), 14:56. Wolfpack 21–0. Drive: 3 plays, 3 yards, 0:14.
- NCSU – Kanoah Vinesett 51-yard field goal, 8:03. Wolfpack 24–0. Drive: 7 plays, 28 yards, 2:30.
- MEM – Jamari Hawkins 28-yard pass from Brendon Lewis (Gianni Spetic kick), 4:59. Wolfpack 24–7. Drive: 8 plays, 75 yards, 3:04.
- NCSU – Teddy Hoffmann 40-yard pass from CJ Bailey (Kanoah Vinesett kick), 1:28. Wolfpack 31–7. Drive: 3 plays, 75 yards, 0:27.

Third quarter

- No scoring plays.

Fourth quarter

- No scoring plays.

Statistics	MEM	NCSU
First downs	17	17
Plays–yards	70–303	59–337
Rushes–yards	36–149	33–116
Passing yards	154	221
Passing: comp–att–int	20–34–1	14–26–0
Turnovers	2	0
Time of possession	27:23	32:37

Team	Category	Player	Statistics
Memphis	Passing	Brendon Lewis	14/25, 106 yards, TD, INT
Memphis	Rushing	Khyair Spain	9 carries, 65 yards
Memphis	Receiving	Marcello Bussey	3 receptions, 34 yards
NC State	Passing	CJ Bailey	14/25, 221 yards, 2 TD
NC State	Rushing	Jayden Scott	19 carries, 108 yards
NC State	Receiving	Wesley Grimes	3 receptions, 38 yards, TD
