= 2025 NC State Wolfpack football team =

American college football season

2025 NC State Wolfpack football

Gasparilla Bowl champion

Gasparilla Bowl, W 31–7 vs. Memphis
- Conference: Atlantic Coast Conference
- Record: 8–5 (4–4 ACC)
- Head coach: Dave Doeren (13th season)
- Offensive coordinator: Kurt Roper (1st season)
- Offensive scheme: Power spread
- Defensive coordinator: D. J. Eliot (1st season)
- Co-defensive coordinator: Charlton Warren (1st season)
- Base defense: Multiple 3–4
- Home stadium: Carter–Finley Stadium

2025 Atlantic Coast Conference football standings
	Conf.			Overall
Team	W		L	W		L
No. 16 Virginia y	7	–	1	11	–	3
Duke y$	6	–	2	9	–	5
No. 2 Miami (FL) ^	6	–	2	13	–	3
Georgia Tech	6	–	2	9	–	4
SMU	6	–	2	9	–	4
Pittsburgh	6	–	2	8	–	5
Louisville	4	–	4	9	–	4
Wake Forest	4	–	4	9	–	4
NC State	4	–	4	8	–	5
California	4	–	4	7	–	6
Clemson	4	–	4	7	–	6
Stanford	3	–	5	4	–	8
Florida State	2	–	6	5	–	7
Virginia Tech	2	–	6	3	–	9
North Carolina	2	–	6	4	–	8
Boston College	1	–	7	2	–	10
Syracuse	1	–	7	3	–	9
Championship: Duke 27, Virginia 20^{OT}
^ – College Football Playoff participant; $ – Conference champion; y – Championship game participant; As of October 19, 2026; Rankings from AP Poll

The 2025 NC State Wolfpack football team represented North Carolina State University during the 2025 NCAA Division I FBS football season. The Wolfpack play their home games at Carter–Finley Stadium located in Raleigh, North Carolina, and compete as members of the Atlantic Coast Conference. They are led by head coach Dave Doeren, in his 13th season as the team's head coach.

The NC State Wolfpack drew an average home attendance of 56,919.

== Transfers ==
=== Incoming ===
Name	Pos.	Height	Weight	Hometown	Prev. school
Teague Andersen	OT	6'4	265	Lehi, UT	Utah State
Brock Stukes	IOL	6'3	317	Chesapeake, VA	North Carolina A&T
Ian Flynt	TE	6'4	255	Katy, TX	Nebraska
Cian Slone	LB	6'4	235	Rocklin, CA	Utah State

== Schedule ==
Date	Time	Opponent	Site	TV	Result	Attendance
August 28	7:00 p.m.	East Carolina*	Carter–Finley Stadium; Raleigh, NC (rivalry)	ACCN	W 24–17	56,919
September 6	Noon	Virginia (Note: Although both NC State and Virginia are ACC members, this game will not count in the conference standings. The schools scheduled it as a non-conference game because they otherwise meet every two or three years due to it not being a protected matchup.)*	Carter–Finley Stadium; Raleigh, NC	ESPN2	W 35–31	56,919
September 11	7:30 p.m.	at Wake Forest	Allegacy Federal Credit Union Stadium; Winston-Salem, NC (rivalry)	ESPN	W 34–24	29,043
September 20	4:00 p.m.	at Duke	Wallace Wade Stadium; Durham, NC (rivalry)	ESPN2	L 33–45	30,022
September 27	7:00 p.m.	Virginia Tech	Carter–Finley Stadium; Raleigh, NC	The CW	L 21–23	56,919
October 4	2:00 p.m.	Campbell*	Carter–Finley Stadium; Raleigh, NC	ACCNX/ESPN+	W 56–10	56,919
October 11	3:30 p.m.	at No. 16 Notre Dame*	Notre Dame Stadium; Notre Dame, IN	Peacock/NBC (Note: Game also aired on NBC at the end of the USC at UCLA women's volleyball game.)	L 7–36	77,622
October 25	3:30 p.m.	at Pittsburgh	Acrisure Stadium; Pittsburgh, PA	ACCN	L 34–53	46,840
November 1	7:30 p.m.	No. 8 Georgia Tech^{†}	Carter–Finley Stadium; Raleigh, NC	ESPN2	W 48–36	56,919
November 15	3:30 p.m.	at No. 15 Miami (FL)	Hard Rock Stadium; Miami Gardens, FL	ESPN	L 7–41	59,157
November 21	8:00 p.m.	Florida State	Carter–Finley Stadium; Raleigh, NC	ESPN	W 21–11	56,919
November 29	7:30 p.m.	North Carolina	Carter–Finley Stadium; Raleigh, NC (rivalry)	ACCN	W 42–19	56,919
December 19	2:30 p.m.	Memphis*	Raymond James Stadium; Tampa, FL (Gasparilla Bowl)	ESPN	W 31–7	13,336
*Non-conference game; ^{†}Homecoming; Rankings from AP Poll (and CFP Rankings, after November 4) - Released prior to game; All times are in Eastern time

== Game summaries ==
=== vs East Carolina (rivalry) ===
East Carolina Pirates (0–0) at NC State Wolfpack (0–0) – Game summary

Quarter	1	2	3	4	Total
Pirates	0	7	0	10	17
Wolfpack	3	14	7	0	24

at Carter–Finley Stadium • Raleigh, NC

- Date: August 28
- Game time: 7:00 p.m.
- Game weather: Sunny
- Game attendance: 56,919
- Referee: Charles Lamertina
- TV announcers (ACCN): Wes Durham (play-by-play), Steve Addazio (analyst), and Dana Boyle (sideline)

Game information

First quarter

- NCSU – Nick Konieczynski 29-yard field goal, 8:34. Wolfpack 3–0. Drive: 15 plays, 64 yards, 6:26.

Second quarter

- NCSU – CJ Bailey 11-yard run (Nick Konieczynski kick), 13:33. Wolfpack 10–0. Drive: 7 plays, 61 yards, 3:31.
- NCSU – Wesley Grimes 48-yard pass from CJ Bailey (Nick Konieczynski kick), 11:03. Wolfpack 17–0. Drive: 2 plays, 48 yards, 0:42.
- ECU – Jayvontay Conner 79-yard pass from Katin Houser (Nick Mazzie kick), 2:21. Wolfpack 17–7. Drive: 6 plays, 86 yards, 1:43.

Third quarter

- NCSU – Hollywood Smothers 2-yard run (Nick Konieczynski kick), 3:43. Wolfpack 24–7. Drive: 10 plays, 80 yards, 4:53.

Fourth quarter

- ECU – Marlon Gunn Jr. 4-yard run (Nick Mazzie kick), 14:56. Wolfpack 24–14. Drive: 9 plays, 72 yards, 3:42.
- ECU – Nick Mazzie 34-yard field goal, 8:32. Wolfpack 24–17. Drive: 9 plays, 61 yards, 3:51.

Statistics	ECU	NCSU
First downs	18	21
Plays–yards	73–436	67–428
Rushes–yards	28–53	33–110
Passing yards	383	318
Passing: comp–att–int	31–45–0	24–34–1
Turnovers	0	1
Time of possession	27:53	32:07

Team	Category	Player	Statistics
East Carolina	Passing	Katin Houser	30/44, 366 yards, TD
East Carolina	Rushing	London Montgomery	8 carries, 32 yards
East Carolina	Receiving	Jayvontay Conner	2 receptions, 98 yards, TD
NC State	Passing	CJ Bailey	24/34, 318 yards, TD, INT
NC State	Rushing	Hollywood Smothers	22 carries, 76 yards, TD
NC State	Receiving	Wesley Grimes	4 receptions, 121 yards, TD

=== vs Virginia ===
Virginia Cavaliers (1–0) at NC State Wolfpack (1–0) – Game summary

Quarter	1	2	3	4	Total
Cavaliers	14	10	7	0	31
Wolfpack	7	7	21	0	35

at Carter–Finley Stadium • Raleigh, NC

- Date: September 6
- Game time: Noon
- Game weather: Sunny, 86 °F (30 °C), SW 7mph
- Game attendance: 56,919
- Referee: Jon Noli
- TV announcers (ESPN2): Bob Wischusen (play-by-play), Sam Acho (analyst), and Taylor Davis (sideline)

Game information

First quarter

- UVA – J'Mari Taylor 39-yard run (Will Bettridge kick), 10:37. Cavaliers 7–0. Drive: 10 plays, 75 yards, 4:23.
- NCSU – CJ Bailey 30-yard run (Kanoah Vinesett kick), 8:26. Tied 7–7. Drive: 5 plays, 75 yards, 2:11.
- UVA – J'Mari Taylor 9-yard run (Will Bettridge kick), 3:41. Cavaliers 14–7. Drive: 12 plays, 75 yards, 4:45.

Second quarter

- NCSU – Noah Rogers 27-yard pass from CJ Bailey (Kanoah Vinesett kick), 14:23. Tied 14–14. Drive: 9 plays, 75 yards, 4:18.
- UVA – Will Bettridge 29-yard field goal, 4:08. Cavaliers 17–14. Drive: 11 plays, 59 yards, 6:12.
- UVA – Sage Ennis 3-yard pass from Chandler Morris (Will Bettridge kick), 0:17. Cavaliers 24–14. Drive: 7 plays, 27 yards, 2:47.

Third quarter

- NCSU – Hollywood Smothers 14-yard run (Kanoah Vinesett kick), 10:46. Cavaliers 24–21. Drive: 8 plays, 75 yards, 4:14.
- NCSU – CJ Bailey 12-yard run (Kanoah Vinesett kick), 6:39. Wolfpack 28–24. Drive: 5 plays, 80 yards, 2:41.
- UVA – J'Mari Taylor 66-yard run (Will Bettridge kick), 5:11. Cavaliers 31–28. Drive: 3 plays, 75 yards, 1:28.
- NCSU – Hollywood Smothers 9-yard run (Kanoah Vinesett kick), 0:45. Wolfpack 35–31. Drive: 9 plays, 75 yards, 4:26.

Fourth quarter

- No scoring plays.

Statistics	UVA	NCSU
First downs	24	22
Plays–yards	76–514	65–416
Rushes–yards	32–257	35–216
Passing yards	30–257	16–200
Passing: comp–att–int	30–43–1	16–23–0
Turnovers	1	0
Time of possession	32:25	27:35

Team	Category	Player	Statistics
Virginia	Passing	Chandler Morris	30/43, 257 yards, TD, INT
Virginia	Rushing	J'Mari Taylor	17 carries, 150 yards, 3 TD
Virginia	Receiving	Jahmal Edrine	6 receptions, 68 yards
NC State	Passing	CJ Bailey	16/23, 200 yards, TD
NC State	Rushing	Hollywood Smothers	17 carries, 140 yards, 2 TD
NC State	Receiving	Terrell Anderson	3 receptions, 44 yards

=== at Wake Forest (rivalry) ===
NC State Wolfpack (2–0) at Wake Forest Demon Deacons (2–0) – Game summary

Quarter	1	2	3	4	Total
Wolfpack	14	3	7	10	34
Demon Deacons	14	10	0	0	24

at Allegacy Federal Credit Union Stadium • Winston-Salem, NC

- Date: September 11
- Game time: 7:30 p.m.
- Game weather: Clear, 73 °F (23 °C), SE 3mph
- Game attendance: 29,043
- Referee: Tim Hedgepeth
- TV announcers (ESPN): Matt Barrie (play-by-play), Tom Luginbill (analyst), and Harry Lyles Jr. (sideline)

Game information

First quarter

- WAKE – Chris Barnes 98-yard kickoff return (Connor Calvert kick), 14:48. Demon Deacons 7–0.
- WAKE – Demond Claiborne 1-yard run (Connor Calvert kick), 7:19. Demon Deacons 14–0. Drive: 7 plays, 93 yards, 2:47.
- NCSU – Justin Joly 5-yard pass from CJ Bailey (Kanoah Vinesett kick), 2:35. Demon Deacons 14–7. Drive: 8 plays, 75 yards, 4:44.
- NCSU – Isaiah Shirley 41-yard interception return (Kanoah Vinesett kick), 1:19. Tied 14–14.

Second quarter

- WAKE – Robby Ashford 1-yard run (Connor Calvert kick), 12:12. Demon Deacons 21–14. Drive: 9 plays, 75 yards, 4:07.
- WAKE – Connor Calvert 28-yard field goal, 4:07. Demon Deacons 24–14. Drive: 11 plays, 69 yards, 4:50.
- NCSU – Kanoah Vinesett 24-yard field goal, 1:00. Demon Deacons 24–17. Drive: 11 plays, 68 yards, 3:07.

Third quarter

- NCSU – Justin Joly 4-yard pass from CJ Bailey (Kanoah Vinesett kick), 6:22. Tied 24–24. Drive: 8 plays, 70 yards, 3:46.

Fourth quarter

- NCSU – Keenan Jackson 12-yard pass from CJ Bailey (Kanoah Vinesett kick), 12:37. Wolfpack 31–24. Drive: 5 plays, 70 yards, 2:54.
- NCSU – Kanoah Vinesett 38-yard field goal, 6:19. Wolfpack 34–24. Drive: 8 plays, 31 yards, 5:31.

Statistics	NCSU	WAKE
First downs	24	12
Plays–yards	76–406	57–311
Rushes–yards	44–205	22–59
Passing yards	32–201	35–252
Passing: comp–att–int	23–32–0	21–35–0
Turnovers	0	2
Time of possession	38:05	21:55

Team	Category	Player	Statistics
NC State	Passing	CJ Bailey	23/32, 201 yards, 3 TD
NC State	Rushing	Hollywood Smothers	24 carries, 164 yards
NC State	Receiving	Noah Rogers	4 receptions, 52 yards
Wake Forest	Passing	Robby Ashford	21/35, 252 yards, 2 INT
Wake Forest	Rushing	Demond Claiborne	12 carries, 35 yards, TD
Wake Forest	Receiving	Chris Barnes	3 receptions, 76 yards

=== at Duke (Tobacco Road) ===
NC State Wolfpack (3–0) at Duke Blue Devils (1–2) – Game summary

Quarter	1	2	3	4	Total
Wolfpack	7	13	6	7	33
Blue Devils	7	14	14	10	45

at Wallace Wade Stadium • Durham, NC

- Date: September 20
- Game time: 4:00 p.m.
- Game weather: Scattered clouds, 88 °F (31 °C), E 7 mph
- Game attendance: 30,022
- Referee: Justin Elliott
- TV announcers (ESPN2): Mike Monaco (play-by-play), Kirk Morrison (analyst), and Dawn Davenport (sideline)

Game information

First quarter

- NCSU – Terrell Anderson 75-yard pass from CJ Bailey (Kanoah Vinesett kick), 14:10. Wolfpack 7–0. Drive: 3 plays, 74 yards, 0:45.
- DUKE – Anderson Castle 2-yard run (Todd Pelino kick), 10:49. Tied 7–7. Drive: 10 plays, 70 yards, 3:16.

Second quarter

- NCSU – Terrell Anderson 6-yard pass from CJ Bailey (Kanoah Vinesett kick), 14:18. Wolfpack 14–7. Drive: 16 plays, 99 yards, 9:13.
- NCSU – Will Wilson 1-yard run (Kanoah Vinesett kick failed), 5:45. Wolfpack 20–7. Drive: 10 plays, 80 yards, 4:54.
- DUKE – Landen King 17-yard pass from Darian Mensah (Todd Pelino kick), 2:20. Wolfpack 20–14. Drive: 10 plays, 72 yards, 3:20.
- DUKE – Anderson Castle 1-yard run (Todd Pelino kick), 0:16. Blue Devils 21–20. Drive: 2 plays, 12 yards, 0:29.

Third quarter

- DUKE – Sahmir Hagans 33-yard pass from Darian Mensah (Todd Pelino kick), 13:30. Blue Devils 28–20. Drive: 4 plays, 75 yards, 1:30.
- NCSU – Hollywood Smothers 51-yard run (run failed), 11:53. Blue Devils 28–26. Drive: 4 plays, 75 yards, 1:37.
- DUKE – Cooper Barkate 37-yard pass from Darian Mensah (Todd Pelino kick), 8:32. Blue Devils 35–26. Drive: 8 plays, 75 yards, 3:21.

Fourth quarter

- DUKE – Todd Pelino 43-yard field goal, 14:18. Blue Devils 38–26. Drive: 8 plays, 37 yards, 2:59.
- NCSU – Will Wilson 1-yard run (Kanoah Vinesett kick), 4:01. Blue Devils 38–33. Drive: 15 plays, 95 yards, 7:26.
- DUKE – Anderson Castle 66-yard run (Todd Pelino kick), 2:19. Blue Devils 45–33. Drive: 3 plays, 75 yards, 1:42.

Statistics	NCSU	DUKE
First downs	26	22
Plays–yards	73–537	62–419
Rushes–yards	34–173	34–150
Passing yards	364	269
Passing: comp–att–int	29–39–3	19–28–0
Turnovers	4	0
Time of possession	32:29	27:31

Team	Category	Player	Statistics
NC State	Passing	CJ Bailey	29/39, 364 yards, 2 TD, 3 INT
NC State	Rushing	Hollywood Smothers	17 carries, 123 yards, TD
NC State	Receiving	Terrell Anderson	6 receptions, 166 yards, 2 TD
Duke	Passing	Darian Mensah	19/28, 269 yards, 3 TD
Duke	Rushing	Anderson Castle	12 carries, 92 yards, 3 TD
Duke	Receiving	Cooper Barkate	3 reception, 65 yards, TD

=== vs Virginia Tech ===
Virginia Tech Hokies (1–3) at NC State Wolfpack (3–1) – Game summary

Quarter	1	2	3	4	Total
Hokies	3	10	7	3	23
Wolfpack	7	0	7	7	21

at Carter–Finley Stadium • Raleigh, NC

- Date: September 27
- Game time: 7:00 p.m.
- Game weather: Cloudy, 75 °F (24 °C), NE 1 mph
- Game attendance: 56,919
- Referee: Jon Noli
- TV announcers (The CW): Thom Brennaman (play-by-play), Will Blackmon (analyst), and Wes Bryant (sideline)

Game information

First quarter

- VT – John Love 39-yard field goal, 8:51. Hokies 3–0. Drive: 5 plays, 19 yards, 1:00.
- NCSU – Dante Daniels 4-yard pass from CJ Bailey (Kanoah Vinesett kick), 2:38. Wolfpack 7–3. Drive: 12 plays, 75 yards, 6:13.

Second quarter

- VT – Marcellous Hawkins 11-yard pass from Kyron Drones (John Love kick), 9:26. Hokies 10–7. Drive: 10 plays, 62 yards, 4:41.
- VT – John Love 32-yard field goal, 2:26. Hokies 13–7. Drive: 11 plays, 77 yards, 4:07.

Third quarter

- NCSU – Keenan Jackson 13-yard pass from CJ Bailey (Kanoah Vinesett kick), 9:10. Wolfpack 14–13. Drive: 12 plays, 75 yards, 5:50.
- VT – Cameron Seldon 4-yard pass from Kyron Drones (John Love kick), 0:20. Hokies 20–14. Drive: 2 plays, 89 yards, 0:44.

Fourth quarter

- NCSU – Jayden Scott 1-yard run (Kanoah Vinesett kick), 10:58. Wolfpack 21–20. Drive: 10 plays, 75 yards, 4:22.
- VT – John Love 49-yard field goal, 6:31. Hokies 23–21. Drive: 9 plays, 35 yards, 4:20.

Statistics	VT	NCSU
First downs	18	18
Plays–yards	65–406	66–299
Rushes–yards	31–229	32–59
Passing yards	177	240
Passing: comp–att–int	20–34–0	26–34–0
Turnovers	0	0
Time of possession	29:49	30:11

Team	Category	Player	Statistics
Virginia Tech	Passing	Kyron Drones	20/34, 177 yards, 2 TD
Virginia Tech	Rushing	Terion Stewart	15 carries, 174 yards
Virginia Tech	Receiving	Ayden Greene	3 receptions, 44 yards
NC State	Passing	CJ Bailey	26/34, 240 yards, 2 TD
NC State	Rushing	Hollywood Smothers	16 carries, 67 yards
NC State	Receiving	Terrell Anderson	4 receptions, 65 yards

=== vs Campbell (FCS) ===
Campbell Fighting Camels (FCS) (1–4) at NC State Wolfpack (3–2) – Game summary

Quarter	1	2	3	4	Total
Fighting Camels (FCS)	7	0	0	3	10
Wolfpack	21	28	7	0	56

at Carter–Finley Stadium • Raleigh, NC

- Date: October 4
- Game time: 2:00 p.m.
- Game weather: Sunny, 76 °F (24 °C), NE 2 mph
- Game attendance: 56,919
- Referee: Nate Black
- TV announcers (ACCNX/ESPN+): Jorge Sedano (play-by-play), Rodney McLeod (analyst), and Victoria Arlen (sideline)

Game information

First quarter

- NCSU – Will Wilson 2-yard run (Kanoah Vinesett kick), 13:03. Wolfpack 7–0. Drive: 5 plays, 75 yards, 1:57.
- CAM – Mike Chandler II 13-yard pass from Kamden Sixkiller (Alex Crabb kick), 8:54. Tied 7–7. Drive: 2 plays, 14 yards, 0:46.
- NCSU – Hollywood Smothers 59-yard run (Kanoah Vinesett kick), 8:13. Wolfpack 14–7. Drive: 2 plays, 75 yards, 0:41.
- NCSU – Cody Hardy 37-yard pass from CJ Bailey (Kanoah Vinesett kick), 2:48. Wolfpack 21–7. Drive: 5 plays, 66 yards, 1:55.

Second quarter

- NCSU – Hollywood Smothers 16-yard pass from CJ Bailey (Kanoah Vinesett kick), 13:45. Wolfpack 28–7. Drive: 4 plays, 51 yards, 2:26.
- NCSU – Terrell Anderson 34-yard pass from CJ Bailey (Kanoah Vinesett kick), 8:33. Wolfpack 35–7. Drive: 5 plays, 74 yards, 1:58.
- NCSU – Jayden Scott 14-yard run (Kanoah Vinesett kick), 2:28. Wolfpack 42–7. Drive: 7 plays, 88 yards, 3:34.
- NCSU – Justin Joly 10-yard pass from CJ Bailey (Kanoah Vinesett kick), 0:43. Wolfpack 49–7. Drive: 3 plays, 68 yards, 1:01.

Third quarter

- NCSU – Jayden Scott 2-yard run (Kanoah Vinesett kick), 6:06. Wolfpack 56–7. Drive: 9 plays, 57 yards, 4:30.

Fourth quarter

- CAM – Alex Crabb 46-yard field goal, 4:09. Wolfpack 56–10. Drive: 4 plays, 12 yards, 2:09.

Statistics	CAM	NCSU
First downs	13	28
Plays–yards	65–188	60–607
Rushes–yards	33–67	26–236
Passing yards	121	371
Passing: comp–att–int	20–32–0	25–34–1
Turnovers	0	2
Time of possession	33:00	27:00

Team	Category	Player	Statistics
Campbell	Passing	Kamden Sixkiller	12/22, 87 yards, TD
Campbell	Rushing	JJ Cowan	12 carries, 48 yards
Campbell	Receiving	Mike Chandler II	2 receptions, 24 yards, TD
NC State	Passing	CJ Bailey	20/23, 337 yards, 4 TD
NC State	Rushing	Hollywood Smothers	4 carries, 123 yards, TD
NC State	Receiving	Noah Rogers	3 receptions, 62 yards

=== at No. 16 Notre Dame ===
NC State Wolfpack (4–2) at No. 16 Notre Dame Fighting Irish (3–2) – Game summary

Quarter	1	2	3	4	Total
Wolfpack	0	7	0	0	7
No. 16 Fighting Irish	7	3	14	12	36

at Notre Dame Stadium • South Bend, IN

- Date: October 11
- Game time: 3:30 p.m.
- Game weather: Sunny, 67 °F (19 °C), NE 8 mph
- Game attendance: 77,622
- Referee: Tim Hedgepeth
- TV announcers (Peacock/NBC): Dan Hicks (play-by-play), Jason Garrett (analyst), and Zora Stephenson (sideline)

Game information

First quarter

- (9:49) ND – Jeremiyah Love 2-yard run, Noah Burnette kick (Drive: 6 plays, 58 yards, 3:04, Notre Dame 7–0)

Second quarter

- (13:48) NCSU – Terrell Anderson 45-yard pass from CJ Bailey, Kanoah Vinesett kick (Drive: 11 plays, 83 yards, 4:27, Tied 7–7)
- (0:00) ND – Noah Burnette 48-yard field goal (Drive: 5 plays, 40 yards, 0:23, Notre Dame 10–7)

Third quarter

- (6:58) ND – KK Smith 18-yard pass from CJ Carr, Noah Burnette kick (Drive: 11 plays, 90 yards, 5:56, Notre Dame 17–7)
- (2:46) ND – Will Pauling 12-yard pass from CJ Carr, Noah Burnette kick (Drive: 5 plays, 80 yards, 1:28, Notre Dame 24–7)

Fourth quarter

- (12:48) ND – Noah Burnette 34-yard field goal (Drive: 4 plays, 1 yard, 1:16, Notre Dame 27–7)
- (9:17) ND – Team safety (Drive: 1 play, -2 yards, 0:20, Notre Dame 29–7)
- (5:13) ND – Jeremiyah Love 1-yard run, Erik Schmidt kick (Drive: 10 plays, 82 yards, 3:41, Notre Dame 36–7)

Statistics	NCSU	ND
First downs	12	24
Plays–yards	59–233	71–485
Rushes–yards	28–51	39–143
Passing yards	182	342
Passing: comp–att–int	18–31–3	19–32–1
Turnovers	3	1
Time of possession	28:47	31:13

Team	Category	Player	Statistics
NC State	Passing	CJ Bailey	17/30, 186 yards, TD, 3 INT
NC State	Rushing	Hollywood Smothers	12 carries, 46 yards
NC State	Receiving	Terrell Anderson	3 receptions, 57 yards, TD
Notre Dame	Passing	CJ Carr	19/31, 342 yards, 2 TD, INT
Notre Dame	Rushing	Jeremiyah Love	18 carries, 86 yards, 2 TD
Notre Dame	Receiving	Eli Raridon	7 receptions, 109 yards

=== at Pittsburgh ===
NC State Wolfpack (4–3) at Pittsburgh Panthers (5–2) – Game summary

Quarter	1	2	3	4	Total
Wolfpack	7	14	0	13	34
Panthers	10	21	15	7	53

at Acrisure Stadium • Pittsburgh, PA

- Date: October 25
- Game time: 3:30 p.m.
- Game weather: Cloudy, 55 °F (13 °C), SW 2 mph
- Game attendance: 46,840
- Referee: Jerry Magallanes
- TV announcers (ACCN): Chris Cotter (play-by-play), Max Browne (analyst), and Kendra Douglas (sideline)

Game information

First quarter

- (11:13) PITT - Ja'Kyrian Turner 1-yard run, Trey Butkowski kick (Drive: 7 plays, 49 yards, 2:29; Pittsburgh 7–0)
- (6:05) PITT - Trey Butkowski 34-yard field goal (Drive: 10 plays, 62 yards, 4:01; Pittsburgh 10–0)
- (3:08) NCSU - Justin Joly 25-yard pass from CJ Bailey, Kanoah Vinesett kick (Drive: 6 plays, 74 yards, 2:52; Pittsburgh 10–7)

Second quarter

- (14:57) PITT - Desmond Reid 2-yard run, Trey Butkowski kick (Drive: 7 plays, 83 yards, 3:06; Pittsburgh 17–7)
- (14:46) NCSU - Daylan Smothers 65-yard run, Kanoah Vinesett kick (Drive: 1 play, 65 yards, 0:11; Pittsburgh 17–14)
- (7:15) PITT - Raphael Williams Jr. 7-yard pass from Mason Heintschel, Trey Butkowski kick (Drive: 7 plays, 90 yards, 3:19; Pittsburgh 24–14)
- (3:20) NCSU - Justin Joly 59-yard pass from Teddy Hoffmann, Kanoah Vinesett kick (Drive: 4 plays, 83 yards, 2:09; Pittsburgh 24–21)
- (0:12) PITT - Kenny Johnson 10-yard pass from Mason Heintschel, Trey Butkowski kick (Drive: 9 plays, 75 yards, 3:08; Pittsburgh 31–21)

Third quarter

- (12:42) PITT - Trey Butkowski 41-yard field goal (Drive: 10 plays, 43 yards, 2:12; Pittsburgh 34–21)
- (10:46) PITT - Cataurus Hicks 84-yard pass from Mason Heintschel, Mason Heintschel pass failed (Drive: 1 play, 84 yards, 0:12; Pittsburgh 40–21)
- (7:02) PITT - Trey Butkowski 35-yard field goal (Drive: 7 plays, 32 yards, 2:47; Pittsburgh 43–21)
- (1:55) PITT - Trey Butkowski 43-yard field goal (Drive: 5 plays, 19 yards, 2:52; Pittsburgh 46–21)

Fourth quarter

- (11:16) NCSU - Teddy Hoffmann 30-yard pass from CJ Bailey, Kanoah Vinesett kick (Drive: 9 plays, 70 yards, 3:35; Pittsburgh 46–28)
- (6:59) PITT - Ja'Kyrian Turner 6-yard run, Trey Butkowski kick (Drive: 7 plays, 43 yards, 4:17; Pittsburgh 53–28)
- (1:00) NCSU - Noah Rogers 25-yard pass from CJ Bailey, Will Wilson run failed (Drive: 6 plays, 70 yards, 1:22; Pittsburgh 53–34)

Statistics	NCSU	PITT
First downs	15	29
Plays–yards	60–445	82–529
Rushes–yards	19–161	33–106
Passing yards	284	423
Passing: comp–att–int	25–41–0	28–49–1
Turnovers	1	1
Time of possession	25:04	34:56

Team	Category	Player	Statistics
NC State	Passing	CJ Bailey	24/40, 225 yards, 3 TD
NC State	Rushing	Hollywood Smothers	8 carries, 86 yards, TD
NC State	Receiving	Justin Joly	6 receptions, 101 yards, 2 TD
Pittsburgh	Passing	Mason Heintschel	28/48, 423 yards, 3 TD
Pittsburgh	Rushing	Ja'Kyrian Turner	13 carries, 50 yards, 2 TD
Pittsburgh	Receiving	Cataurus Hicks	4 receptions, 120 yards, TD

=== vs No. 8 Georgia Tech ===
No. 8 Georgia Tech Yellow Jackets (8–0) at NC State Wolfpack (4–4) – Game summary

Quarter	1	2	3	4	Total
No. 8 Yellow Jackets	7	10	13	6	36
Wolfpack	14	10	14	10	48

at Carter–Finley Stadium • Raleigh, NC

- Date: November 1
- Game time: 7:30 p.m.
- Game weather: Cloudy
- Game attendance: 56,919
- Referee: Adam Savoie
- TV announcers (ESPN2): Matt Schumacker (play-by-play), Sam Acho (analyst), and Taylor Davis (sideline)

Game information

First quarter

- NCSU – Cody Hardy 5-yard pass from CJ Bailey (Kanoah Vinesett kick), 8:49. Wolfpack 7–0. Drive: 10 plays, 75 yards, 6:11.
- GT – Haynes King 12-yard run (Aidan Birr kick), 6:49. Tied 7–7. Drive: 4 plays, 75 yards, 2:00.
- NCSU – CJ Bailey 11-yard run (Kanoah Vinesett kick), 1:59. Wolfpack 14–7. Drive: 10 plays, 78 yards, 4:45.

Second quarter

- GT – Aidan Birr 43-yard field goal, 13:49. Wolfpack 14–10. Drive: 9 plays, 44 yards, 3:05.
- GT – J.T. Byrne 2-yard pass from Haynes King (Aidan Birr kick), 6:25. Yellow Jackets 17–14. Drive: 10 plays, 60 yards, 5:26.
- NCSU – Cody Hardy fumble return (Kanoah Vinesett kick), 3:07. Wolfpack 21–17. Drive: 7 plays, 75 yards, 3:24.
- NCSU – Kanoah Vinesett 34-yard field goal, 0:00. Wolfpack 24–17. Drive: 8 plays, 46 yards, 0:56.

Third quarter

- GT – Aidan Birr 23-yard field goal, 8:10. Wolfpack 24–20. Drive: 12 plays, 70 yards, 6:50.
- NCSU – Will Wilson 1-yard run (Kanoah Vinesett kick), 7:00. Wolfpack 31–20. Drive: 3 plays, 75 yards, 1:10.
- GT – Aidan Birr 29-yard field goal, 4:52. Wolfpack 31–23. Drive: 5 plays, 71 yards, 2:04.
- NCSU – Teddy Hoffman 55-yard pass from CJ Bailey (Kanoah Vinesett kick), 2:49. Wolfpack 38–23. Drive: 5 plays, 80 yards, 1:58.
- GT – Haynes King 3-yard run (Aidan Birr kick), 0:08. Wolfpack 38–30. Drive: 7 plays, 75 yards, 2:41.

Fourth quarter

- NCSU – Kanoah Vinesett 37-yard field goal, 9:46. Wolfpack 41–30. Drive: 11 plays, 55 yards, 5:22.
- NCSU – Jayden Scott 30-yard run (Kanoah Vinesett kick), 4:07. Wolfpack 48–30. Drive: 9 plays, 76 yards, 4:18.
- GT – Zion Taylor 16-yard pass from Haynes King (pass failed), 2:22. Wolfpack 48–36. Drive: 8 plays, 76 yards, 1:40.

Statistics	GT	NCSU
First downs	30	26
Plays–yards	70–559	67–583
Rushes–yards	33–151	34–243
Passing yards	408	340
Passing: comp–att–int	25–37–1	24–33–0
Turnovers	1	0
Time of possession	28:35	31:25

Team	Category	Player	Statistics
Georgia Tech	Passing	Haynes King	25/35, 408 yards, 2 TD
Georgia Tech	Rushing	Haynes King	20 carries, 103 yards, 2 TD
Georgia Tech	Receiving	Jordan Allen	5 receptions, 110 yards
NC State	Passing	CJ Bailey	24/32, 340 yards, 2 TD
NC State	Rushing	Jayden Scott	24 carries, 196 yards, TD
NC State	Receiving	Teddy Hoffman	3 receptions, 74 yards, TD

=== at No. 15 Miami (FL) ===
NC State Wolfpack (5–4) at No. 15 Miami Hurricanes (7–2) – Game summary

Quarter	1	2	3	4	Total
Wolfpack	0	0	0	7	7
No. 15 Hurricanes	10	14	10	7	41

at Hard Rock Stadium • Miami Gardens, FL

- Date: November 15
- Game time: 3:30 p.m.
- Game weather: Cloudy • Temperature: 78 °F (26 °C) • Wind: E at 7 miles per hour (11 km/h)
- Game attendance: 59,157
- Referee: Justin Elliott
- TV announcers (ESPN): Mark Jones (play-by-play), Roddy Jones (analyst), and Quint Kessenich (sideline)

Game information

First quarter

- MIA – Carter Davis 31-yard field goal, 7:13. Hurricanes 3–0. Drive: 11 plays, 77 yards, 5:37.
- MIA – Jakobe Thomas 60-yard interception return, Carter Davis kick 3:36. Hurricanes 10–0.

Second quarter

- MIA – CharMar Brown 1-yard run, Carter Davis kick 11:16. Hurricanes 17–0. Drive: 3 plays, 47 yards, 1:32.
- MIA – Malachi Toney 14-yard pass from Carson Beck, Carter Davis kick 0:33. Hurricanes 24–0. Drive: 9 plays, 66 yards, 2:43.

Third quarter

- MIA – Elija Lofton 29-yard pass from Carson Beck, Carter Davis kick 9:55. Hurricanes 31–0. Drive: 8 plays, 85 yards, 4:58.
- MIA – Carter Davis 38-yard field goal, 3:51. Hurricanes 34–0. Drive: 10 plays, 67 yards, 5:13.

Fourth quarter

- MIA – Malachi Toney 15-yard pass from Carson Beck, Bert Auburn kick 11:48. Hurricanes 41–0. Drive: 8 plays, 88 yards, 4:27.
- NCSU – CJ Bailey 10-yard run, Kanoah Vinesett kick 2:18. Hurricanes 41–7. Drive: 10 plays, 75 yards, 5:01.

Statistics	NCSU	MIA
First downs	9	28
Plays–yards	50–143	70–581
Rushes–yards	20–23	37–214
Passing yards	120	367
Passing: comp–att–int	17–30–2	24–33–0
Turnovers	2	1
Time of possession	23:17	36:43

Team	Category	Player	Statistics
NC State	Passing	CJ Bailey	17/30, 120 yards, 2 INT
NC State	Rushing	Jayden Scott	7 carries, 14 yards
NC State	Receiving	Jayden Scott	3 receptions, 40 yards
Miami (FL)	Passing	Carson Beck	21/27, 291 yards, 3 TD
Miami (FL)	Rushing	Girard Pringle Jr.	17 carries, 116 yards
Miami (FL)	Receiving	Keelan Marion	7 receptions, 96 yards

=== vs Florida State ===
Florida State Seminoles (5–5) at NC State Wolfpack (5–5) – Game summary

Quarter	1	2	3	4	Total
Seminoles	0	3	0	8	11
Wolfpack	7	0	7	7	21

at Carter–Finley Stadium • Raleigh, NC

- Date: November 21
- Game time: 8:00 p.m.
- Game weather: Mist • Temperature: 61 °F (16 °C) • Wind: SSW at 4 mph (6.4 km/h)
- Game attendance: 56,919
- Referee: Riley Johnson
- TV announcers (ESPN): Anish Shroff (play-by-play), Andre Ware (analyst) and Paul Carcaterra (sideline)

Game information

First quarter

- (2:56) NCSU – Terrell Anderson 23-yard pass from CJ Bailey, Kanoah Vinesett kick (Drive: 9 plays, 73 yards, 5:05; NC State 7–0)

Second quarter

- (14:06) FSU – Jake Weinberg 46-yard field goal (Drive: 10 plays, 52 yards, 3:44; NC State 7–3)

Third quarter

- (4:17) NCSU – Will Wilson 1-yard run, Kanoah Vinesett kick (Drive: 15 plays, 79 yards, 8:59; NC State 14–3)

Fourth quarter

- (8:17) FSU – Duce Robinson 9-yard pass from Tommy Castellanos, Jayvan Boggs pass (Drive: 10 plays, 86 yards, 4:42; NC State 14–11)
- (1:47) NCSU – Justin Joly 12-yard pass from CJ Bailey, Kanoah Vinesett kick (Drive: 4 plays, 17 yards, 0:34; NC State 21–11)

Statistics	FSU	NCSU
First downs	21	20
Plays–yards	66–383	68–286
Rushes–yards	34–180	42–134
Passing yards	203	152
Passing: comp–att–int	16–32–2	18–26–0
Turnovers	4	0
Time of possession	27:03	32:57

Team	Category	Player	Statistics
Florida State	Passing	Tommy Castellanos	16/32, 203 yards, TD, 2 INT
Florida State	Rushing	Tommy Castellanos	11 carries, 76 yards
Florida State	Receiving	Duce Robinson	4 receptions, 74 yards, TD
NC State	Passing	CJ Bailey	18/25, 152 yards, 2 TD
NC State	Rushing	Hollywood Smothers	21 carries, 84 yards
NC State	Receiving	Justin Joly	5 receptions, 66 yards, TD

=== vs North Carolina (rivalry) ===
North Carolina Tar Heels (4-7) at NC State Wolfpack (6-5) – Game summary

Quarter	1	2	3	4	Total
Tar Heels	0	10	3	6	19
Wolfpack	14	14	0	14	42

at Carter–Finley Stadium • Raleigh, NC

- Date: November 29
- Game time: 7:30 p.m.
- Game weather: Clear • Temperature: 34 °F (1 °C) • Wind: SE at 4 mph (6.4 km/h)
- Game attendance: 56,919
- Referee: Nate Black
- TV announcers (ACCN): Chris Cotter (play-by-play), Max Browne (analyst) and Ashley Stroehlein (sideline)

Game information

First quarter

- NCSU – Wesley Grimes 15-yard pass from CJ Bailey (Kanoah Vinesett kick), 10:10. Wolfpack 7–0. Drive: 11 plays, 75 yards, 4:50.
- NCSU – Will Wilson 7-yard run (Kanoah Vinesett kick), 3:26. Wolfpack 14–0. Drive: 12 plays, 76 yards, 5:22.

Second quarter

- UNC – Jordan Shipp 20-yard pass from Gio Lopez (Rece Verhoff kick), 13:03. Wolfpack 14–7. Drive: 9 plays, 80 yards, 5:14.
- NCSU – Will Wilson 1-yard run (Kanoah Vinesett kick), 7:12. Wolfpack 21–7. Drive: 11 plays, 75 yards, 5:51.
- UNC – Rece Verhoff 49-yard field goal, 1:49. Wolfpack 21–10. Drive: 11 plays, 45 yards, 5:23.
- NCSU – Justin Joly 1-yard pass from CJ Bailey (Kanoah Vinesett kick), 0:18. Wolfpack 28–10. Drive: 11 plays, 75 yards, 1:31.

Third quarter

- UNC – Rece Verhoff 29-yard field goal, 3:16. Wolfpack 28–13. Drive: 12 plays, 78 yards, 4:51.

Fourth quarter

- NCSU – Will Wilson 15-yard run (Kanoah Vinesett kick), 14:52. Wolfpack 35–13. Drive: 8 plays, 75 yards, 3:24.
- NCSU – Will Wilson 3-yard run (Kanoah Vinesett kick), 5:34. Wolfpack 42–13. Drive: 10 plays, 42 yards, 6:52.
- UNC – Jordan Owens 4-yard pass from Au'Tori Newkirk (pass failed), 1:25. Wolfpack 42–19. Drive: 11 plays, 65 yards, 4:09.

Statistics	UNC	NCSU
First downs	20	27
Plays–yards	60–265	72–386
Rushes–yards	24–70	42–185
Passing yards	195	201
Passing: comp–att–int	22–36–0	21–30–0
Turnovers	1	0
Time of possession	27:01	32:59

Team	Category	Player	Statistics
North Carolina	Passing	Gio Lopez	11/16, 118 yards, TD
North Carolina	Rushing	Benjamin Hall	6 carries, 29 yards
North Carolina	Receiving	Jordan Shipp	8 receptions, 90 yards, TD
NC State	Passing	CJ Bailey	21/30, 201 yards, 2 TD
NC State	Rushing	Will Wilson	12 carries, 54 yards, 4 TD
NC State	Receiving	Wesley Grimes	5 receptions, 61 yards, TD

=== vs. Memphis (Gasparilla Bowl) ===
2025 Gasparilla Bowl
Memphis Tigers (8–4) vs. NC State Wolfpack (7–5) – Game summary

Quarter	1	2	3	4	Total
Tigers	0	7	0	0	7
Wolfpack	14	17	0	0	31

at Raymond James Stadium • Tampa, FL

- Date: December 19
- Game time: 2:30 p.m. EST
- Game weather: Sunny • Temperature: 77 °F (25 °C) • Wind: E at 10 mph (16 km/h)
- Game attendance: 13,336
- Referee: Nolan Dumas
- TV announcers (ESPN): Anish Shroff (play-by-play), Andre Ware (analyst) and Paul Carcaterra (sideline)

Game information

First quarter

- NCSU – CJ Bailey 14-yard run (Kanoah Vinesett kick), 11:32. Wolfpack 7–0. Drive: 7 plays, 75 yards, 3:28.
- NCSU – Wesley Grimes 31-yard pass from CJ Bailey (Kanoah Vinesett kick), 3:21. Wolfpack 14–0. Drive: 4 plays, 67 yards, 0:55.

Second quarter

- NCSU – Will Wilson 1-yard run (Kanoah Vinesett kick), 14:56. Wolfpack 21–0. Drive: 3 plays, 3 yards, 0:14.
- NCSU – Kanoah Vinesett 51-yard field goal, 8:03. Wolfpack 24–0. Drive: 7 plays, 28 yards, 2:30.
- MEM – Jamari Hawkins 28-yard pass from Brendon Lewis (Gianni Spetic kick), 4:59. Wolfpack 24–7. Drive: 8 plays, 75 yards, 3:04.
- NCSU – Teddy Hoffmann 40-yard pass from CJ Bailey (Kanoah Vinesett kick), 1:28. Wolfpack 31–7. Drive: 3 plays, 75 yards, 0:27.

Third quarter

- No scoring plays.

Fourth quarter

- No scoring plays.

Statistics	MEM	NCSU
First downs	17	17
Plays–yards	70–303	59–337
Rushes–yards	36–149	33–116
Passing yards	154	221
Passing: comp–att–int	20–34–1	14–26–0
Turnovers	2	0
Time of possession	27:23	32:37

Team	Category	Player	Statistics
Memphis	Passing	Brendon Lewis	14/25, 106 yards, TD, INT
Memphis	Rushing	Khyair Spain	9 carries, 65 yards
Memphis	Receiving	Marcello Bussey	3 receptions, 34 yards
NC State	Passing	CJ Bailey	14/25, 221 yards, 2 TD
NC State	Rushing	Jayden Scott	19 carries, 108 yards
NC State	Receiving	Wesley Grimes	3 receptions, 38 yards, TD
