= 2026 NC State Wolfpack football team =

American college football season

2026 NC State Wolfpack football
- Conference: Atlantic Coast Conference
- Record: 5–6 (3–5 ACC)
- Head coach: Dave Doeren (14th season; first 7 games); Todd Goebbel (interim; remainder of season)
- Offensive coordinator: Kurt Roper (2nd season)
- Offensive scheme: Power spread
- Defensive coordinator: D. J. Eliot (2nd season)
- Co-defensive coordinator: Charlton Warren (2nd season)
- Base defense: Multiple 3–4
- Home stadium: Carter–Finley Stadium

2026 Atlantic Coast Conference football standings
	Conf.			Overall
Team	W		L	W		L
No. 7 Miami (FL) y	8	–	0	10	–	1
No. 11 Wake Forest y	7	–	1	10	–	1
No. 23 Louisville	7	–	2	8	–	3
Clemson	5	–	3	7	–	4
SMU	5	–	3	7	–	4
Duke	4	–	4	7	–	4
Stanford	4	–	4	6	–	5
Virginia	4	–	4	6	–	5
Boston College	3	–	4	5	–	6
Pittsburgh	3	–	5	6	–	5
Virginia Tech	3	–	5	6	–	5
NC State	3	–	5	5	–	6
Florida State	3	–	5	5	–	6
Syracuse	3	–	6	5	–	6
North Carolina	2	–	5	5	–	6
California	2	–	6	3	–	8
Georgia Tech	2	–	6	3	–	8
Championship: Miami (FL) vs. Wake Forest
^ – College Football Playoff participant; $ – Conference champion; y – Championship game participant; As of November 22, 2026; Rankings from CFP rankings

The 2026 NC State Wolfpack football team represents North Carolina State University as a member of the Atlantic Coast Conference (ACC) during the 2026 NCAA Division I FBS football season. They play their home games at Carter–Finley Stadium located in Raleigh, North Carolina.

The Wolfpack were led by Dave Doeren in his 14th season as head coach before being fired on October 24, the day after a 31–28 loss to Stanford. Running backs coach/special teams coordinator Todd Goebbel was named interim head coach for the rest of the season.

== Schedule ==
The Week 0 game on August 29 against Virginia was initially scheduled to be held in Rio de Janeiro, Brazil. Due to issues with hosting the event in Brazil, the game was moved to Charlottesville, Virginia.

Date	Time	Opponent	Site	TV	Result	Attendance
August 29	3:30 p.m.	at Virginia	Scott Stadium; Charlottesville, VA	ESPN/ACCN	L 8–34	62,779
September 11	7:00 p.m.	Richmond*	Carter–Finley Stadium; Raleigh, NC	ESPNU	W 73–0	56,919
September 19	12:45 p.m.	at Vanderbilt*	FirstBank Stadium; Nashville, TN	SECN	L 31–35	35,000
September 26	7:30 p.m.	Appalachian State*	Carter–Finley Stadium; Raleigh, NC	ESPNU	W 41–31	56,919
October 3	3:30 p.m.	Louisville	Carter–Finley Stadium; Raleigh, NC	ACCN	W 31–28	56,919
October 10	Noon	Wake Forest	Carter–Finley Stadium; Raleigh, NC (rivalry)	The CW	L 14–38	56,919
October 23	10:30 p.m.	at Stanford	Stanford Stadium; Stanford, CA	ESPN	L 28–31	13,949
October 31	Noon	California^{†}	Carter–Finley Stadium; Raleigh, NC	ACCN	W 31–10	52,933
November 7	12:30 p.m.	Duke	Carter–Finley Stadium; Raleigh, NC (rivalry)	The CW	L 3–41	56,919
November 14	Noon	Syracuse	Carter–Finley Stadium; Raleigh, NC	ACCN	L 31–34	53,948
November 21	3:30 p.m.	at Florida State	Doak Campbell Stadium; Tallahassee, FL	ACCN	W 28–10	60,143
November 28	12:00 p.m.	at North Carolina	Kenan Stadium; Chapel Hill, NC (rivalry)	ACCN		
*Non-conference game; ^{†}Homecoming; All times are in Eastern time

== Game summaries ==
=== at Virginia ===
NC State Wolfpack (0–0) at Virginia Cavaliers (0–0) – Game summary

Quarter	1	2	3	4	Total
Wolfpack	0	0	8	0	8
Cavaliers	10	7	7	10	34

at Scott Stadium • Charlottesville, Virginia

- Date: August 29
- Game time: 3:30 p.m.
- Game weather: Sunny • Temperature: 83 °F (28 °C) • Wind: SW 5 mph
- Game attendance: 62,779
- Referee: Nate Black
- TV announcers (ESPN): Wes Durham, Max Browne, and Madison Fitzpatrick

Game information

First quarter

- UVA – Will Bettridge 47-yard field goal, 5:11. Cavaliers 3–0. Drive: 7 plays, 31 yards, 3:47.
- UVA – Xavier Brown 1-yard run (Will Bettridge kick), 2:37. Cavaliers 10–0. Drive: 4 plays, 32 yards, 2:06.

Second quarter

- UVA – Xavier Brown 45-yard pass from Beau Pribula (Will Bettridge kick), 11:26. Cavaliers 17–0. Drive: 7 plays, 77 yards, 4:18.

Third quarter

- UVA – Da'Shawn Martin 47-yard pass from Beau Pribula (Will Bettridge kick), 13:35. Cavaliers 24–0. Drive: 3 plays, 75 yards, 1:25.
- NCSU – Will Wilson 1-yard run (CJ Bailey–Deandre Desinor pass), 4:59. Cavaliers 24–8. Drive: 9 plays, 60 yards, 5:24.

Fourth quarter

- UVA – Xay Davis 1-yard run (Will Bettridge kick), 7:44. Cavaliers 31–8. Drive: 23 plays, 75 yards, 12:15.
- UVA – Will Bettridge 42-yard field goal, 4:26. Cavaliers 34–8. Drive: 4 plays, 8 yards, 2:11.

Statistics	NCSU	UVA
First downs	10	18
Plays–yards	51–168	68–413
Rushes–yards	24–76	57–258
Passing yards	92	155
Passing: comp–att–int	15–27–1	9–11–0
Turnovers	2	0
Time of possession	21:56	38:04

Team	Category	Player	Statistics
NC State	Passing	CJ Bailey	12/23, 84 yards, INT
NC State	Rushing	CJ Bailey	10 carries, 33 yards
NC State	Receiving	Vander Ploog	2 receptions, 25 yards
Virginia	Passing	Beau Pribula	9/11, 155 yards, 2 TD
Virginia	Rushing	Beau Pribula	15 carries, 110 yards
Virginia	Receiving	Xavier Brown	2 receptions, 58 yards, TD

=== vs. Richmond (FCS) ===
Richmond Spiders (FCS) (2–0) at NC State Wolfpack (0–1) – Game summary

Quarter	1	2	3	4	Total
Spiders (FCS)	0	0	0	0	0
Wolfpack	21	28	14	10	73

at Carter–Finley Stadium • Raleigh, North Carolina

- Date: September 11
- Game time: 7:00 p.m.
- Game weather: Sunny • Temperature: 86 °F (30 °C) • Wind: SW 3 mph
- Game attendance: 56,919
- Referee: Riley Johnson
- TV announcers (ESPNU): Jay Alter and Tom Luginbill

Game information

First quarter

- NCSU – Davion Gause 19-yard run (Kanoah Vinesett kick), 11:21. Wolfpack 7–0. Drive: 4 plays, 77 yards, 1:48.
- NCSU – Jayden Scott 65-yard run (Kanoah Vinesett kick), 10:44. Wolfpack 14–0. Drive: 1 play, 65 yards, 0:11.
- NCSU – Jayden Scott 7-yard run (Kanoah Vinesett kick), 1:01. Wolfpack 21–0. Drive: 13 plays, 86 yards, 7:08.

Second quarter

- NCSU – CJ Bailey 1-yard run (Kanoah Vinesett kick), 11:33. Wolfpack 28–0. Drive: 5 plays, 42 yards, 2:43.
- NCSU – Will Wilson 1-yard run (Kanoah Vinesett kick), 8:30. Wolfpack 35–0. Drive: 5 plays, 71 yards, 2:05.
- NCSU – Preston Douglas 15-yard pass from CJ Bailey (Kanoah Vinesett kick), 6:23. Wolfpack 42–0. Drive: 3 plays, 50 yards, 1:01.
- NCSU – Will Wilson 1-yard run (Kanoah Vinesett kick), 0:24. Wolfpack 49–0. Drive: 8 plays, 86 yards, 1:18.

Third quarter

- NCSU – Will Wilson 5-yard run (Kanoah Vinesett kick), 9:04. Wolfpack 56–0. Drive: 11 plays, 66 yards, 5:56.
- NCSU – Hunter Provience 3-yard pass from Will Wilson (Kanoah Vinesett kick), 4:12. Wolfpack 63–0. Drive: 2 plays, 54 yards, 0:54.

Fourth quarter

- NCSU – Kanoah Vinesett 45-yard field goal, 6:31. Wolfpack 66–0. Drive: 10 plays, 55 yards, 10:13.
- NCSU – Dylan McCoy 51-yard run (Kanoah Vinesett kick), 1:49. Wolfpack 73–0. Drive: 5 plays, 68 yards, 2:17.

Statistics	RICH	NCSU
First downs	6	31
Plays–yards	49–110	69–734
Rushes–yards	22–34	45–448
Passing yards	76	306
Passing: comp–att–int	8–27–1	18–24–0
Turnovers	1	0
Time of possession	22:17	37:43

Team	Category	Player	Statistics
Richmond	Passing	Ashten Snelsire	8/23, 76 yards, INT
Richmond	Rushing	Warrick Stephenson	14 carries, 58 yards
Richmond	Receiving	Michael Creamer	1 reception, 23 yards
NC State	Passing	CJ Bailey	13/17, 281 yards, TD
NC State	Rushing	Jayden Scott	9 carries, 128 yards, 2 TD
NC State	Receiving	Keenan Jackson	4 receptions, 123 yards

=== at Vanderbilt ===
The Commodores overcame a 24–7 deficit in the third quarter. After falling behind early, they rallied to make it a three point game late in the fourth and got the ball back with less than a minute to play. However, they threw a pick at the goal line with less than 30 seconds left, giving NC State the ball back. With six seconds left, NC State attempted to take a safety to run out the clock, but CJ Bailey fumbled the ball in the end zone. Vanderbilt recovered in the end zone for a touchdown to complete the comeback and improve to 3–0. The play is known as the "Music City Miracle II" or the "Music City Miscue".

NC State Wolfpack (1–1) at Vanderbilt Commodores (2–0) – Game summary

Quarter	1	2	3	4	Total
Wolfpack	14	3	7	7	31
Commodores	0	7	7	21	35

at FirstBank Stadium • Nashville, Tennessee

- Date: September 19
- Game time: 12:45 p.m.
- Game weather: Sunny • Temperature: 93 °F (34 °C)
- Game attendance: 35,000
- Referee: Mike Roche
- TV announcers (SECN): Taylor Zarzour, Matt Stinchcomb, and Michella Chester
- Report: Official report

Statistics	NCSU	VAN
First downs	25	20
Plays–yards	79–446	58–409
Rushes–yards	41–166	24–132
Passing yards	280	277
Passing: comp–att–int	26–38–1	20–34–2
Time of possession	35:49	24:11

Team	Category	Player	Statistics
NC State	Passing	CJ Bailey	25/37, 275 yards, 3 TD
NC State	Rushing	Jayden Scott	16 carries, 51 yards
NC State	Receiving	Keenan Jackson	9 receptions, 102 yards, 3 TD
Vanderbilt	Passing	Jared Curtis	20/34, 277 yards, 3 TD, 2 INT
Vanderbilt	Rushing	Jared Curtis	12 carries, 64 yards
Vanderbilt	Receiving	Junior Sherrill	6 receptions, 108 yards, 2 TD

=== vs. Appalachian State ===
Appalachian State Mountaineers (3–0) at NC State Wolfpack (1–2) – Game summary

Quarter	1	2	3	4	Total
Mountaineers	0	10	7	14	31
Wolfpack	14	14	3	10	41

at Carter–Finley Stadium • Raleigh, North Carolina

- Date: September 26
- Game time: 7:30 p.m.
- Game weather: Sunny • Temperature: 70 °F (21 °C)
- Game attendance: 56,919
- Referee: Justin Elliott
- TV announcers (ESPNU): Jason Ross Jr. and Tyoka Jackson

Statistics	APP	NCSU
First downs		
Plays–yards		
Rushes–yards		
Passing yards		
Passing: comp–att–int		
Time of possession		

Team	Category	Player	Statistics
Appalachian State	Passing		
Appalachian State	Rushing		
Appalachian State	Receiving		
NC State	Passing		
NC State	Rushing		
NC State	Receiving		

=== vs. Louisville ===
Louisville Cardinals (2–2) at NC State Wolfpack (2–2) – Game summary

Quarter	1	2	3	4	Total
Cardinals	0	7	14	7	28
Wolfpack	3	10	15	3	31

at Carter–Finley Stadium • Raleigh, North Carolina

- Date: October 3
- Game time: 3:30 p.m.
- Game weather: Rain • Temperature: 78 °F (26 °C)
- Game attendance: 56,919
- Referee: Darryl Deberry
- TV announcers (ACCN): Justin Kutcher, Max Browne, and Madison Fitzpatrick

Statistics	LOU	NCSU
First downs		
Plays–yards		
Rushes–yards		
Passing yards		
Passing: comp–att–int		
Time of possession		

Team	Category	Player	Statistics
Louisville	Passing		
Louisville	Rushing		
Louisville	Receiving		
NC State	Passing		
NC State	Rushing		
NC State	Receiving		

=== vs. Wake Forest (rivalry) ===
Wake Forest Demon Deacons (4–1) at NC State Wolfpack (3–2) – Game summary

Quarter	1	2	3	4	Total
Demon Deacons	7	3	21	7	38
Wolfpack	7	7	0	0	14

at Carter–Finley Stadium • Raleigh, North Carolina

- Date: October 10
- Game time: Noon
- Game weather: Rain • Temperature: 65 °F (18 °C) • Wind: NE at 10 miles per hour (16 km/h)
- Game attendance: 56,919
- Referee: Garrett Dickerson
- TV announcers (CW): Thom Brennaman, Jason Cabinda, and Wes Bryant

Statistics	WAKE	NCSU
First downs	22	16
Plays–yards	69–387	64–258
Rushes–yards	36–84	24–15
Passing yards	303	243
Passing: comp–att–int	26–33–0	29–40–0
Turnovers	0	1
Time of possession	31:57	28:30

Team	Category	Player	Statistics
Wake Forest	Passing	Gio Lopez	26/33, 303 yards, 3 TD
Wake Forest	Rushing	Deuce Lawrence	8 carries, 46 yards, TD
Wake Forest	Receiving	Jack Foley	8 receptions, 156 yards, TD
NC State	Passing	CJ Bailey	28/39, 241 yards, TD
NC State	Rushing	Davion Gause	7 carries, 11 yards
NC State	Receiving	Keenan Jackson	5 receptions, 61 yards

=== at Stanford ===
NC State Wolfpack (3–3) at Stanford Cardinal (3–4) – Game summary

Quarter	1	2	3	4	Total
Wolfpack	0	0	0	0	0
Cardinal	0	0	0	0	0

at Stanford Stadium • Stanford, California

- Date: October 23
- Game time: 10:30 p.m.
- Game attendance: 13,949
- Referee: Riley Johnson
- TV announcers (ESPN): Anish Shroff (play-by-play), Andre Ware (analyst) and Morgan Uber (sideline)

Statistics	NCSU	STAN
First downs		
Plays–yards		
Rushes–yards		
Passing yards		
Passing: comp–att–int		
Time of possession		

Team	Category	Player	Statistics
NC State	Passing		
NC State	Rushing		
NC State	Receiving		
Stanford	Passing		
Stanford	Rushing		
Stanford	Receiving		

=== vs. California ===
California Golden Bears (3–5) at NC State Wolfpack (3–4) – Game summary

Quarter	1	2	3	4	Total
Golden Bears	0	0	0	0	0
Wolfpack	0	0	0	0	0

at Carter–Finley Stadium • Raleigh, North Carolina

- Date: October 31
- Game time: Noon
- Game weather: Sunny • Temperature: 62 °F (17 °C) • Wind: NE at 10 miles per hour (16 km/h)
- Game attendance: 52,933
- Referee: Darryl DeBerry
- TV announcers (ACCN): Roxy Bernstein, Dave Clawson, Madison Hock

Statistics	CAL	NCSU
First downs		
Plays–yards		
Rushes–yards		
Passing yards		
Passing: comp–att–int		
Time of possession		

Team	Category	Player	Statistics
California	Passing		
California	Rushing		
California	Receiving		
NC State	Passing		
NC State	Rushing		
NC State	Receiving		

=== vs. Duke ===
Duke Blue Devils (6–2) at NC State Wolfpack (4–4) – Game summary

Quarter	1	2	3	4	Total
Blue Devils	0	0	0	0	0
Wolfpack	0	0	0	0	0

at Carter–Finley Stadium • Raleigh, North Carolina

- Date: November 7
- Game time: 12:30 p.m
- Game weather: Sunny • Temperature: 60 °F (16 °C) • Wind: NW at 7 miles per hour (11 km/h)
- Game attendance: 56,919
- Referee: Jon Noli
- TV announcers (The CW): Thom Brennaman, Jason Cabinda, and Wes Bryant

Statistics	DUKE	NCSU
First downs		
Plays–yards		
Rushes–yards		
Passing yards		
Passing: comp–att–int		
Time of possession		

Team	Category	Player	Statistics
Duke	Passing		
Duke	Rushing		
Duke	Receiving		
NC State	Passing		
NC State	Rushing		
NC State	Receiving		

=== vs. Syracuse ===
Syracuse Orange (4–5) at NC State Wolfpack (4–5) – Game summary

Quarter	1	2	3	4	Total
Orange	0	0	0	0	0
Wolfpack	0	0	0	0	0

at Carter–Finley Stadium • Raleigh, North Carolina

- Date: November 14
- Game time: Noon
- Game weather: Sunny • Temperature: 51 °F (11 °C) • Wind: NW at 11 miles per hour (18 km/h)
- Game attendance: 53,948
- Referee: Justin Elliot
- TV announcers (ACCN): Jorge Sedano, Rodney McLeod, Kendra Douglas

Statistics	SYR	NCSU
First downs		
Plays–yards		
Rushes–yards		
Passing yards		
Passing: comp–att–int		
Time of possession		

Team	Category	Player	Statistics
Syracuse	Passing		
Syracuse	Rushing		
Syracuse	Receiving		
NC State	Passing		
NC State	Rushing		
NC State	Receiving		

=== at Florida State ===
NC State Wolfpack (4–6) at Florida State Seminoles (5–5) – Game summary

Quarter	1	2	3	4	Total
Wolfpack	0	0	0	0	0
Seminoles	0	0	0	0	0

at Doak Campbell Stadium • Tallahassee, Florida

- Date: November 21
- Game time: 3:30 p.m
- TV: ACCN

Statistics	NCSU	FSU
First downs		
Plays–yards		
Rushes–yards		
Passing yards		
Passing: comp–att–int		
Time of possession		

Team	Category	Player	Statistics
NC State	Passing		
NC State	Rushing		
NC State	Receiving		
Florida State	Passing		
Florida State	Rushing		
Florida State	Receiving		

=== at North Carolina (rivalry) ===
NC State Wolfpack (5–6) at North Carolina Tar Heels (5–6) – Game summary

Quarter	1	2	3	4	Total
Wolfpack	0	0	0	0	0
Tar Heels	0	0	0	0	0

at Kenan Stadium • Chapel Hill, North Carolina

- Date: November 28
- Game time: TBD

Statistics	NCSU	UNC
First downs		
Plays–yards		
Rushes–yards		
Passing yards		
Passing: comp–att–int		
Time of possession		

Team	Category	Player	Statistics
NC State	Passing		
NC State	Rushing		
NC State	Receiving		
North Carolina	Passing		
North Carolina	Rushing		
North Carolina	Receiving		
