= Todd Goebbel =

American football coach (born 1976)

Current position
- Title: Interim head coach
- Team: NC State
- Conference: ACC
- Record: 2–2
- Annual salary: $548,473 (2023)

Biographical details
- Born: May 18, 1976 (age 50); Delaware, Ohio, U.S.
- Education: University of Northern Iowa; Quincy University

Playing career
- 1995–1997: Kent State
- 1998: Northern Iowa
- Position: Quarterback

Coaching career (HC unless noted)
- 1999: Wooster (TE)
- 2000–2001: Tiffin (QB/WR)
- 2002–2003: Quincy (OC/QB)
- 2004: Ohio State (DQC)
- 2005–2009: Marshall (STC/WR)
- 2010–2014: Ohio Dominican (AHC/OC/QB)
- 2015: Marshall (STC/TE)
- 2016: Marshall (WR)
- 2017: Marshall (co-OC/WR)
- 2018: Marshall (co-OC/STC/TE)
- 2019–2022: NC State (STC/TE/FB)
- 2023–2026: NC State (STC/RB)
- 2026–present: NC State (interim HC)

Head coaching record
- Overall: 2–2

Todd Goebbel (born May 18, 1976) is an American football coach and former player who is currently serving as interim head coach at North Carolina State University. Previously, he coached at Marshall University, Ohio Dominican University, the Ohio State University, Quincy University, Tiffin University and the College of Wooster.

== Coaching career ==
=== Wooster ===
Goebbel began his coaching career as the tight ends coach for the Wooster Fighting Scots football team for the 1999 season.

=== Tiffin ===
In 2000 and 2001, Goebbel served as the quarterbacks and wide receivers coach for the Tiffin Dragons.

=== Quincy ===
In 2002, Goebbel got his first opportunity as a coordinator, coordinating the offense for the Quincy Hawks. In his two seasons, Goebbel's offense ranked 13th and 10th, nationally, in total offense.

=== Ohio State ===
Following the 2004 season, Goebbel made the jump to Division I football for the first time, when he joined Jim Tressel’s Ohio State staff as a defensive quality control coach.

=== Marshall ===
The following season, Goebbel returned to coordinating, the time as the special teams coordinator, for the Marshall Thundering Herd and newly hired head coach Mark Snyder. Snyder had previously been the defensive coordinator at Ohio State, and the two had worked closely together. Goebbel also coached the team's receivers.

=== Ohio Dominican ===
Following the 2009 season, Snyder resigned from the head coaching position, and Goebbel wasn't retained. He returned to the state of Ohio as the assistant head coach and offensive coordinator for the Ohio Dominican Panthers. From 2010 through 2014, Goebbel led a prolific offense that produced multiple Harlon Hill Trophy candidates, along with 15 all conference players. In 2014, his offense helped lead the Panthers to an 11–2 season, a birth in the NCAA Division II football playoffs, reaching the regional championship game, and a no. 4 ranking in both the AFCA and D2football.com polls.

=== Return to Marshall ===
Following the 2014 season, Goebbel received a chance to return to Marshall when he was hired as the special teams coordinator and tight ends coach by Doc Holliday. The next season, he switched to coaching receivers, before being promoted to co-offensive coordinator for the 2017 season. Goebbel then switched back to tight ends for the 2018 season.

During his tenure, Marshall's special teams stood out. In 2015, The Herd led the nation in special teams efficiency according to ESPN and return specialist Deandre Reaves was named the conference special teams player of the year and tying the school record for return touchdowns with three. Additionally, Long snapper Matt Beardall was named an all-conference player, and Matt Cincotta finished his career with an amazing 569/569 successful snaps.

=== NC State ===
Impressed with Goebbel's work with the Thundering Herd special teams, after playing Marshall in both 2017 and 2018, North Carolina State head coach Dave Doeren hired him to be the new special teams coordinator for the Wolfpack. Goebbel would also continue his work with offensive players, coaching the Pack's tight ends and fullbacks. At the time of his hiring, Doeren saint, “What drew me to Todd was how impressed I’ve been with Marshall’s special teams when we’ve played them each of the past two years,” said Doeren. “I’m excited to add a guy to our staff who has great knowledge in the kicking game - running all of the units and coaching the specialists- and who also knows how to coach multiple positions on offense. He has developed players at tight end, quarterback and wide receiver during his career. He is known as a terrific recruiter and I was blown away by his organization, teaching method, passion for the game, and relationship-building skills.”

During his time in Raleigh, Goebbel has developed Trenton Gill into an NFL draft pick as a punter, as well as Placekicker Christopher Dunn who broke multiple school records, in addition to the multiple offensive players he has coached and developed.

On October 24, 2026, Goebbel was promoted to interim head coach, following Dave Doeren's dismissal. He will be succeeded by former NFL quarterback Philip Rivers in the 2027 season.

== Playing career ==
Goebbel was a three-year letter winner at Kent State as a quarterback. His sophomore year, 1996, he threw for 2,419 yards and 19 touchdowns. He then transferred to Northern Iowa for his senior season in 1998, where he won Gateway Conference Newcomer of the Year honors. He then had a brief stint with the Buffalo Destroyers of the Arena Football League.

== Personal life ==
Goebbel graduated with a BS in physical education from the University of Northern Iowa in 1999, and then a MS in educational leadership from Quincy University in 2004. He is a second generation football coach, as his father, Mike has coached high school football for over forty years, and coached Archie Griffin. Goebbel is married to his wife, Sara, and they have two sons.

== Head coaching record ==
Year	Team	Overall	Conference	Standing	Bowl/playoffs
NC State Wolfpack (Atlantic Coast Conference) (2026–present)
2026	NC State	2–2 (Note: Goebbel was named interim head coach for the remainder of the 2026 season after Dave Doeren was fired after seven games)	2–2		
NC State:		2–2	2–2		
Total:		2–2			
