= Reggie Howard =

American football player and coach (born 1977)

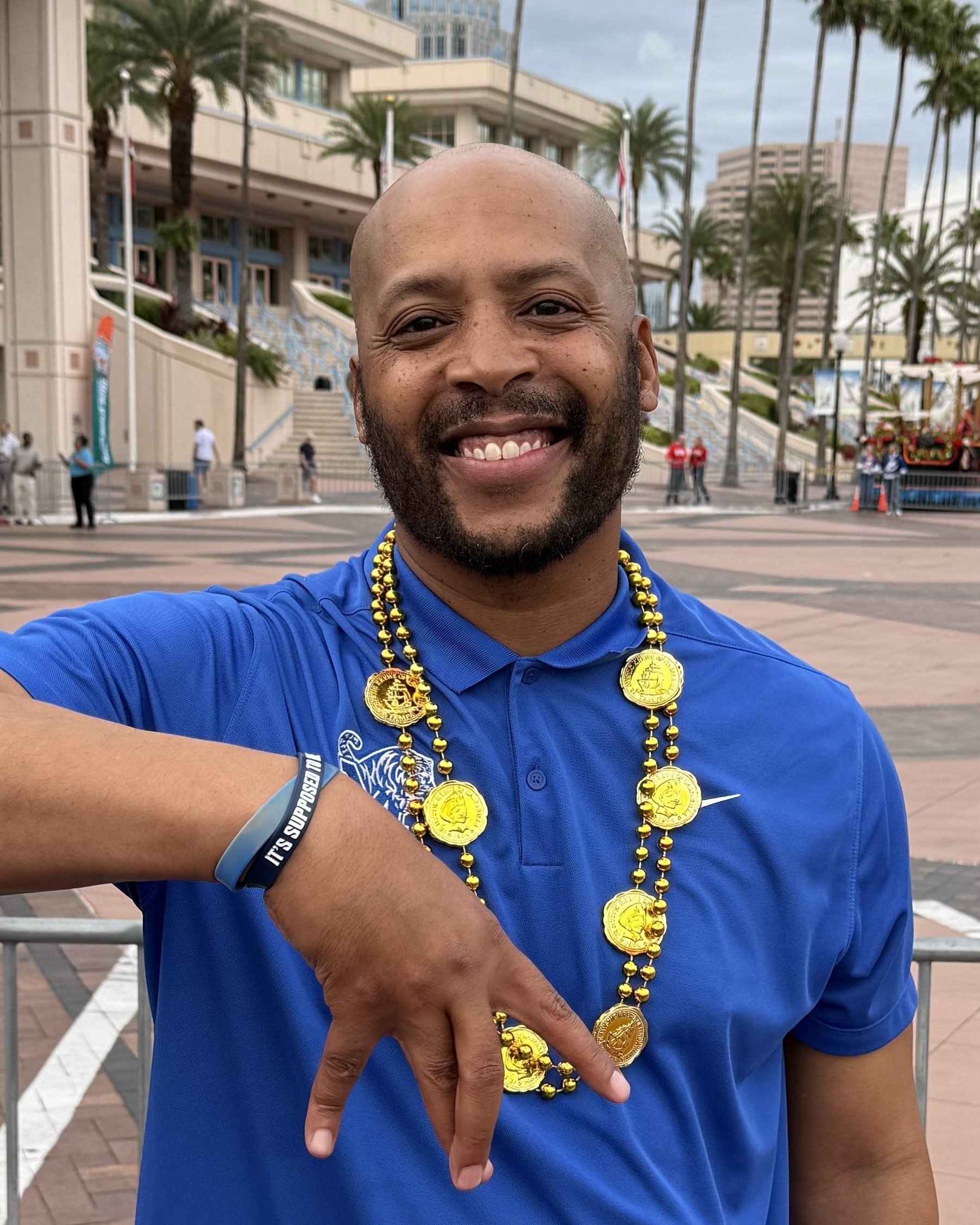
- Howard ahead of the 2025 Gasparilla Bowl

Personal information
- Born: May 17, 1977 (age 49); Charlotte, North Carolina, U.S.

Career information
- College: Memphis
- NFL draft: 2000: undrafted

Career history

Playing
- Carolina Panthers (2000)*; New Orleans Saints (2000); Carolina Panthers (2000–2003); Miami Dolphins (2004–2005); Carolina Panthers (2006)
- * Offseason or practice squad member only

Coaching
- Lane (2015) Defensive backs coach; Kirby HS (2016) Defensive coordinator; Memphis (2017) Defensive assistant; Central Arkansas (2018-2019) Cornerbacks coach; Campbell (2021) Defensive backs coach; Campbell (2022) Co-defensive coordinator & defensive backs coach; Washington Commanders (2023) Defensive quality control coach; Memphis (2024–2025) Assistant head coach/defensive backs coach; Memphis (2025) Interim head coach

Operations
- Memphis (2020) Director of high school relations

Career NFL statistics
- Tackles: 257
- Interceptions: 6
- Sacks: 4.5
- Stats at Pro Football Reference

Reginald Clement Howard (born May 17, 1977) is an American football coach and former cornerback. He played college football at Memphis before joining the NFL as an undrafted free agent in 2000. Howard played in Super Bowl XXXVIII for Carolina Panthers where he recorded an interception, and also had stints with the New Orleans Saints and Miami Dolphins. He became an assistant college football coach in 2015.

== Head coaching record ==
Year	Team	Overall	Conference	Standing	Bowl/playoffs
Memphis Tigers (American Conference) (2025)
2025	Memphis	0–1			L Gasparilla
Memphis:		0–1	0–0		
Total:		0–1			
