= Hollywood Smothers =

American football player (born 2005)

- Hollywood Smothers scores the game-tying touchdown in the historic comeback vs Ohio State

No. 2 – Texas Longhorns
- Position: Running back
- Class: Redshirt Junior

Personal information
- Born: February 3, 2005 (age 21)
- Listed height: 5 ft 11 in (1.80 m)
- Listed weight: 195 lb (88 kg)

Career information
- High school: West Charlotte (Charlotte, North Carolina)
- College: Oklahoma (2023); NC State (2024–2025); Texas (2026–present)

Awards and highlights
- First-team All-ACC (2025)
- Stats at ESPN

Daylan "Hollywood" Smothers (born February 3, 2005) is an American college football running back for the Texas Longhorns. He previously played for the Oklahoma Sooners and NC State Wolfpack.

== Early life ==
Smothers attended Julius L. Chambers High School in Charlotte, North Carolina, for three years before transferring to West Charlotte High School in Charlotte for his senior year. He rushed for 1,206 yards and 12 touchdowns was named North Carolina Mr. Football his sophomore year and had 1,581 yards and 28 touchdowns his junior year. Smothers was suspended and was unable to play his senior year due to an eligibility issue. He committed to the University of Oklahoma to play college football.

== College career ==
=== Oklahoma ===
Smothers played four games his true freshman year at Oklahoma in 2023, recording 11 rushes for 42 yards and maintaining his eligibility. After the season, he entered the transfer portal and transferred to NC State University.

=== NC State ===
He entered his first year at NC State as a backup before starting the final six games of the season. For the 2025 season, he had 571 yards on 89 carries and six touchdowns. In the 2025 season, Smothers recorded 939 rushing yards, 189 receiving yards, six rushing touchdowns, and two receiving touchdowns. He was named to the All-ACC first team. At the end of the season, Smothers entered the transfer portal.

=== Texas ===
Smothers initially committed to Alabama but later flipped his commitment to Texas on January 11, 2026. In Week 2 of the 2026 season against Ohio State, Smothers scored his first touchdown as a Longhorn, recording 74 running yards for two touchdowns. In Week 7 against Florida, he sustained a shoulder injury leading him to miss the next game. In the Week 9 game against Mississippi State, Smothers suffered a torn MCL, leading him to miss the remainder of the season.

=== College statistics ===
Year	Team	Games	Rushing				Receiving				Kick returns		
Year	Team	GP	Att	Yards	Avg	TD	Rec	Yards	Avg	TD	Att	Yards	TD
2023	Oklahoma	4	11	42	3.8	0	1	1	1.0	0	0	0	0
2024	NC State	11	89	571	6.4	6	19	263	13.8	2	3	51	0
2025	NC State	11	160	939	5.9	6	37	189	5.1	1	0	0	0
2026	Texas	2	31	144	4.6	2	6	57	9.5	1	0	0	0
Career		28	291	1,696	5.8	14	63	510	8.1	4	3	51	0
