= Dave Doeren =

American football player and coach (born 1971)

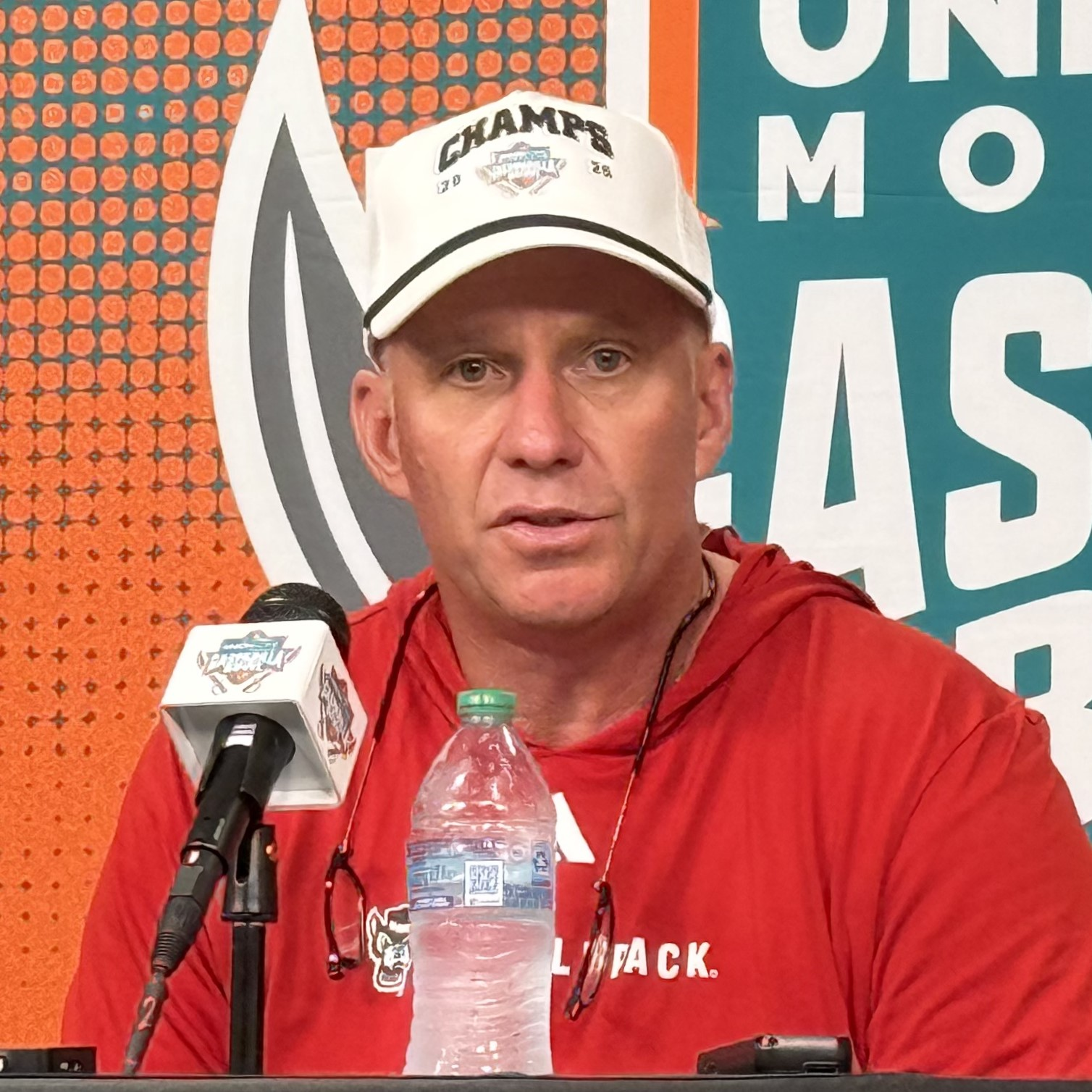
- Doeren after the 2025 Gasparilla Bowl

Biographical details
- Born: December 3, 1971 (age 54); San Diego, California, U.S.
- Education: Bishop Miege High School; Drake University

Playing career
- 1990–1993: Drake
- Position: Tight end

Coaching career (HC unless noted)
- 1994: Shawnee Mission HS (KS) (WR/DL)
- 1995–1996: Drake (LB)
- 1997: Drake (DC/LB)
- 1998–1999: USC (GA)
- 2000–2001: Montana (DB)
- 2002–2004: Kansas (LB/RC)
- 2005: Kansas (co-DC/LB)
- 2006–2007: Wisconsin (co-DC/LB/RC)
- 2008–2010: Wisconsin (DC/LB)
- 2011–2012: Northern Illinois
- 2013–2026: NC State

Head coaching record
- Overall: 121–77
- Bowls: 5–6

Accomplishments and honors

Championships
- 2 MAC (2011–2012)

David William Doeren (born December 3, 1971) is an American college football coach who most recently served as the head coach at North Carolina State University from 2013 to 2026. Doeren previously served as the head football coach at Northern Illinois University from 2011 to 2012 and has been an assistant at the University of Wisconsin–Madison, University of Kansas, University of Montana, and University of Southern California. He played college football at Drake University, where he also held his first assistant coaching position.

== Biography ==
Doeren is married with three children. He is a native of Shawnee, Kansas and attended Drake University, where he played on the football team.

== Coaching career ==
Doeren's first coaching job was as wide receivers and defensive line coach at Shawnee Mission Northwest High School in Shawnee, Kansas.

=== College assistant ===
From there he served as linebackers coach and defensive coordinator of the Drake Bulldogs. Later he became a graduate assistant with the USC Trojans before being named secondary coach of the Montana Grizzlies, where he was a member of the 2001 national championship team. Doeren was linebackers coach with the Kansas Jayhawks from 2002 to 2005 before becoming linebackers coach and co-defensive coordinator of the Wisconsin Badgers. He was given the sole title of defensive coordinator in 2008.

=== Northern Illinois ===
On December 13, 2010, he was named the new head coach of the NIU Huskies.

==== 2011 season ====
Doeren led the Huskies to a Mid-American Conference Championship and a win in the GoDaddy.com Bowl in his first year.

==== 2012 season ====
On November 30, 2012, the Huskies won a second consecutive MAC Championship and become the first MAC team to earn a BCS bid with a trip to the 2013 Orange Bowl. Doeren did not coach the Huskies in the Orange Bowl, which NIU lost to Florida State, as he had already accepted the head coaching position at NC State. Doeren's salary per year was raised to $420,000 in 2012 and he was under contract at NIU until 2017.

=== NC State ===
On December 1, 2012, athletic director Debbie Yow announced that Doeren would be the new head coach of the Wolfpack.

In his first season at the helm, the Wolfpack compiled a record of 3–9 and failed to win an ACC game. In his second season, they improved to 8–5 (one of the fastest turnarounds in school history), and won the 2014 St. Petersburg Bowl. They also posted a decisive 35–7 win against archrival North Carolina. Doeren accomplished all this with the third youngest team in the nation.

In his 13 seasons with the Wolfpack, Doeren had 10 winning seasons and 11 bowl game appearances.

On October 24, 2026, athletic director Boo Corrigan announced the firing of Doeren following a loss the previous evening to Stanford.

== Head coaching record ==
Year	Team	Overall	Conference	Standing	Bowl/playoffs	Coaches^{#}	AP^{°}
Northern Illinois Huskies (Mid-American Conference) (2011–2012)
2011	Northern Illinois	11–3	7–1	T–1st (West)	W GoDaddy.com		
2012	Northern Illinois	12–1	8–0	1st (West)	Orange*^{†}	16	16
Northern Illinois:		23–4	15–1	* Did not coach bowl game			
NC State Wolfpack (Atlantic Coast Conference) (2013–2026)
2013	NC State	3–9	0–8	7th (Atlantic)			
2014	NC State	8–5	3–5	5th (Atlantic)	W St. Petersburg		
2015	NC State	7–6	3–5	4th (Atlantic)	L Belk		
2016	NC State	7–6	3–5	T–4th (Atlantic)	W Independence		
2017	NC State	9–4	6–2	2nd (Atlantic)	W Sun	23	23
2018	NC State	9–4	5–3	3rd (Atlantic)	L Gator		
2019	NC State	4–8	1–7	7th (Atlantic)			
2020	NC State	8–4	7–3	T–4th	L Gator		
2021	NC State	9–3	6–2	T–2nd (Atlantic)	Holiday (Note: NC State claims a forfeit win over UCLA in the 2021 Holiday Bowl which was canceled after UCLA withdrew from the game due to COVID-19 issues in the Bruins' program. The disputed win would be the program's 10th win of the 2021 season and the first double digit win season in Doeren's career with the Wolfpack—the NCAA and ACC do not recognize the forfeit, ruling the bowl a no contest.)	19	20
2022	NC State	8–5	4–4	T–3rd (Atlantic)	L Duke's Mayo		
2023	NC State	9–4	6–2	3rd	L Pop-Tarts	21	21
2024	NC State	6–7	3–5	T–10th	L Military		
2025	NC State	8–5	4–4	T–7th	W Gasparilla		
2026	NC State	3–4	1–3	Fired			
NC State:		98–73	52–57				
Total:		121–77					
National championship Conference title Conference division title or championship game berth
^{†}Indicates BCS bowl.; ^{#}Rankings from final Coaches Poll.; ^{°}Rankings from final AP Poll.
