= Terrell Anderson =

American football player (born 2005)

No. 9 – USC Trojans
- Position: Wide receiver
- Class: Junior

Personal information
- Born: October 31, 2005 (age 21); Detroit, Michigan, U.S.
- Listed height: 6 ft 2 in (1.88 m)
- Listed weight: 200 lb (91 kg)

Career information
- High school: Grimsley (Greensboro, North Carolina)
- College: NC State (2024–2025); USC (2026–present)
- Stats at ESPN

Terrell Anderson (born October 31, 2005) is an American college football wide receiver for the USC Trojans. He previously played for the NC State Wolfpack.

== Early life ==
Anderson attended Grimsley High School in Greensboro, North Carolina. He had 52 receptions for 901 yards with nine touchdowns his sophomore year and 64 receptions for 1,254 yards with 11 touchdowns his junior year. As a senior, he had 64 receptions for 1,114 yards with and touchdowns. Anderson committed to the University of Southern California (USC) to play college football.

== College career ==
Anderson played in all 13 games as a true freshman at NC State in 2024, recording 14 receptions for 158 yards and a touchdown. As a sophomore in 2025, he had 39 receptions for a team-leading 629 yards and five touchdowns. After the season, Anderson entered the transfer portal and committed to the University of Southern California (USC).
