= CJ Bailey =

American football player

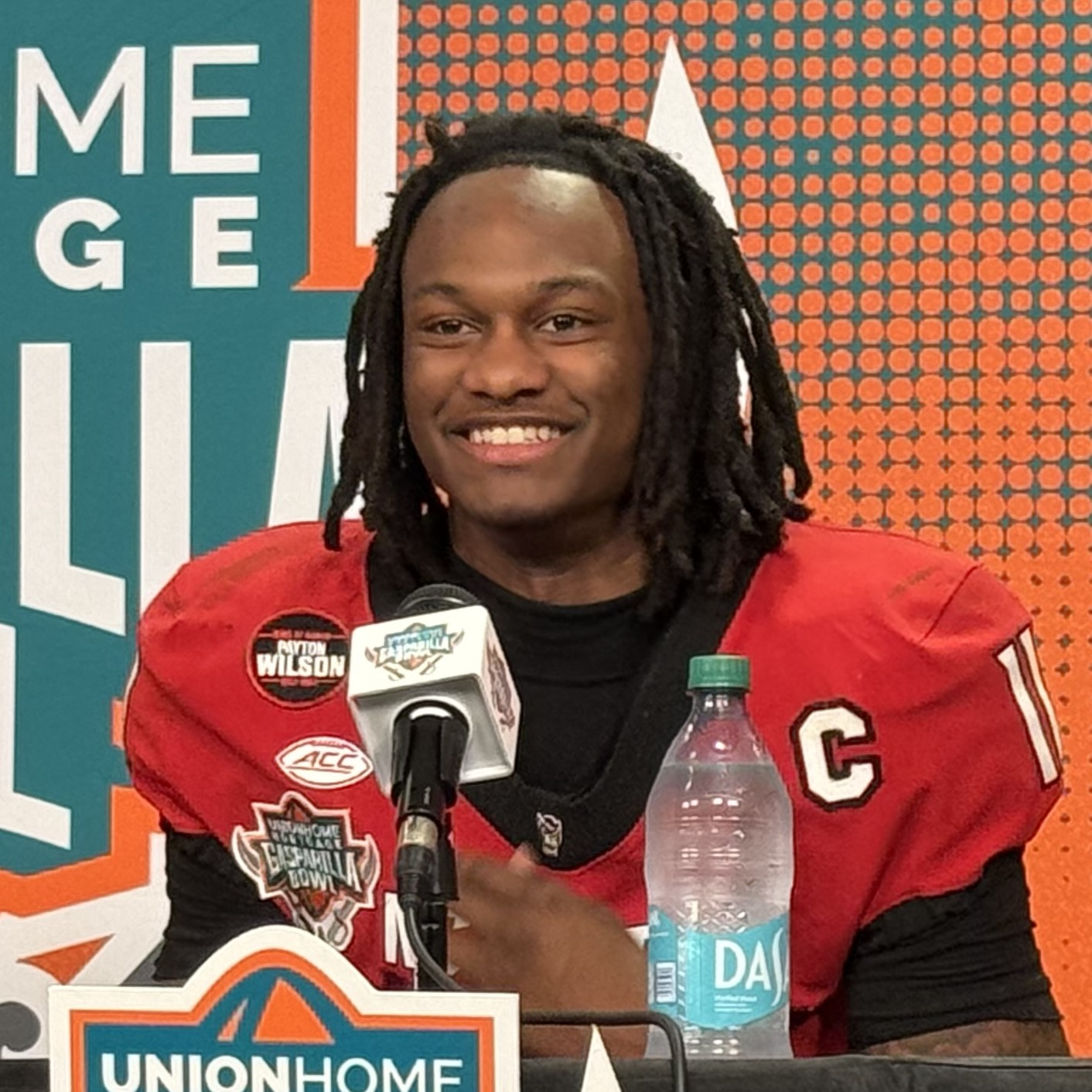
- Bailey after the 2025 Gasparilla Bowl

No. 11 – NC State Wolfpack
- Position: Quarterback
- Class: Junior

Personal information
- Born: May 10, 2006 (age 20)
- Listed height: 6 ft 6 in (1.98 m)
- Listed weight: 213 lb (97 kg)

Career information
- High school: Chaminade-Madonna (Hollywood, Florida)
- College: NC State (2024–present)
- Stats at ESPN

Cedrick Bailey (born May 10, 2006) is an American college football quarterback for the NC State Wolfpack.

== Early life ==
Bailey attended Chaminade-Madonna College Preparatory School in Hollywood, Florida. During his high school career he had 9,005 passing yards and 116 touchdowns. He committed to North Carolina State University to play college football.

== College career ==
Bailey entered his true freshman season at NC State in 2024 as a backup to Grayson McCall. After McCall suffered an injury against Louisiana Tech, Bailey entered the game and helped lead the team to a victory. He started his first career game the next week against Clemson. He completed 16 of 25 passes for 204 yards with a touchdown and an interception.

=== Statistics ===
Season	Team	Games			Passing								Rushing			
Season	Team	GP	GS	Record	Comp	Att	Pct	Yards	Avg	TD	Int	Rate	Att	Yards	Avg	TD
2024	NC State	12	9	4−5	196	302	64.9	2,413	8.0	17	10	144.0	99	279	2.8	5
2025	NC State	13	13	8−5	273	397	68.8	3,105	7.8	25	9	150.7	89	215	2.4	6
2026	NC State	10	10	4−6	186	295	63.1	2,289	7.8	14	5	140.9	74	228	3.1	3
Career		35	32	16–16	655	994	65.9	7,807	7.9	56	24	145.6	262	722	2.8	14
