= Jayden Scott =

American football player

No. 4 – NC State Wolfpack
- Position: Running back
- Class: Redshirt Sophomore

Personal information
- Listed height: 5 ft 10 in (1.78 m)
- Listed weight: 212 lb (96 kg)

Career information
- High school: Stockbridge (Stockbridge, Georgia)
- College: NC State (2024–present)
- Stats at ESPN

Jayden "Duke" Scott is an American college football running back for the NC State Wolfpack.

== Early life ==
Scott is from Stockbridge, Georgia. He attended Stockbridge High School where he played football as a running back. He was limited by injuries during his sophomore and junior seasons, before having a breakout year as a senior, totaling 2,473 rushing yards and 39 touchdowns along with 192 receiving yards and a touchdown, running for over 100 yards in 13 of 15 games while helping Stockbridge to an appearance in the Class AAAA state championship. He was named the 5-4A All-Region Offensive Player of the Year for his performance. Across his sophomore, junior, and senior seasons, he averaged over 176 rushing yards per game. Scott totaled 4,500 rushing yards and 66 touchdowns in his stint at Stockbridge, posting an average of 10 yards per carry. A three-star recruit, he committed to play college football for the NC State Wolfpack.

== College career ==
Scott redshirted as a true freshman at NC State in 2024, appearing in one game while running for four yards. He entered the 2025 season as a backup to Hollywood Smothers, posting 235 rushing yards in the first eight games before starting after an injury to Smothers. In an upset win over undefeated Georgia Tech in his first start, Scott ran 24 times for 196 yards and a touchdown, the 11th-best single-game rushing total in team history. He was named the Shaun Alexander Freshman of the Week for his performance and was runner-up for the Associated Press National Player of the Week award.
