= Anish Shroff =

Indian American sportscaster (born 1982)

Anish Shroff (born 1982) is the radio play-by-play man for the Carolina Panthers and a play-by-play announcer and on-air host at ESPN.

== Early life and education ==
Shroff was born in Bloomfield, New Jersey to Hitesh and Nikita Shroff who are both from Mumbai, India. His father is a professional photographer.

Shroff graduated from Bloomfield High School in 2000, and went on to earn a bachelor's degree in broadcast journalism from Syracuse University's S. I. Newhouse School of Public Communications in 2004. At Syracuse, Shroff worked as student broadcaster for WAER-FM, calling Syracuse Orange games.

== Career ==
He was featured on the second season of ESPN reality show Dream Job in 2004, in which he was one of the three finalists. Following his stint on Dream Job, Shroff worked as an anchor, talk show host and play-by-play announcer at WHEN Radio in Syracuse, New York. He was later a freelance anchor at CSTV (now CBS Sports Network) in New York City and then served as sports director at KNDO-TV in Yakima, Washington.

He joined ESPN on January 1, 2008, initially at ESPNews. While at ESPN, he called college baseball, football, basketball and lacrosse, and hosted various shows on ESPN and ESPNU. In March 2022, he was named the third play-by-play announcer in Carolina Panthers history following Mick Mixon's retirement.
