= List of NC State Wolfpack head football coaches =

The NC State Wolfpack college football team represents North Carolina State University (NC State) in the Atlantic Coast Conference (ACC). The Wolfpack compete as part of the NCAA Division I Football Bowl Subdivision. The program has had 36 head coaches since it began play during the 1892 season. Since December 2012, Dave Doeren has served as head coach at NC State.

Ten coaches have led NC State in postseason bowl games: Beattie Feathers, Earle Edwards, Lou Holtz, Bo Rein, Dick Sheridan, Mike O'Cain, Chuck Amato, Tom O'Brien, Dana Bible, and Doeren. Five of those coaches also won conference championships: Edward L. Greene captured one as a member of the South Atlantic Intercollegiate Athletic Association; Gus Tebell captured one as a member of the Southern Conference; and Edwards captured five, Holtz one, and Rein one as a member of the Atlantic Coast Conference.

Edwards is the leader in seasons coached with 17 years as head coach. The current coach, Dave Doeren, has the most wins with 95 as of the end of the 2025 season. Mickey Whitehurst has the highest winning percentage at 0.893. John Van Liew and Horace Hendrickson have the lowest winning percentage of those who have coached more than one game, with 0.200. Of the 36 different head coaches who have led the Wolfpack, Willie Heston, Buck Shaw, Clipper Smith, Hunk Anderson, Holtz, and Sheridan have been inducted into the College Football Hall of Fame.

== Key ==
Key to symbols in coaches list
General		Overall		Conference		Postseason (Note: Although the first Rose Bowl Game was played in 1902, it has been continuously played since the 1916 game, and is recognized as the oldest bowl game by the NCAA. "—" indicates any season prior to 1916 when postseason games were not played.)	
No.	Order of coaches (Note: A running total of the number of head coaches, with coaches who served separate tenures being counted only once. Interim head coaches are represented with "Int" and are not counted in the running total. "—" indicates the team played but either without a coach or no coach is on record. "X" indicates an interim year without play.)	GC	Games coached	CW	Conference wins	PW	Postseason wins
DC	Division championships	OW	Overall wins	CL	Conference losses	PL	Postseason losses
CC	Conference championships	OL	Overall losses	CT	Conference ties	PT	Postseason ties
NC	National championships	OT	Overall ties (Note: Overtime rules in college football were introduced in 1996, making ties impossible in the period since.)	C%	Conference winning percentage		
†	Elected to the College Football Hall of Fame	O%	Overall winning percentage (Note: When computing the win–loss percentage, a tie counts as half a win and half a loss.)				

== Coaches ==
List of head football coaches showing season(s) coached, overall records, conference records, postseason records, championships and selected awards (Note: Statistics correct as of the end of the 2025 NCAA Division I FCS football season.)
No.	Name	Season(s)	GC	OW	OL	OT	O%	CW	CL	CT	C%	PW	PL	PT	CC	NC	Awards
1; 3	Perrin Busbee	1892; 1896–1897	5	3	2	0	0.600	—	—	—	—	—	—	—	—	—	—
2	Bart Gatling	1893–1895	9	4	4	1	0.500	—	—	—	—	—	—	—	—	—	—
4	W. C. Riddick	1898–1899	6	1	3	2	0.300	—	—	—	—	—	—	—	—	—	—
5	John McKee	1900–1901	12	2	6	4	0.333	—	—	—	—	—	—	—	—	—	—
6	Art Devlin	1902–1903	17	7	8	2	0.471	—	—	—	—	—	—	—	—	—	—
7	Willis Kienholz	1904	6	3	1	2	0.667	—	—	—	—	—	—	—	—	—	—
8	George S. Whitney	1905	6	4	1	1	0.750	—	—	—	—	—	—	—	—	—	—
9	Willie Heston^{†}	1906	8	3	1	4	0.625	—	—	—	—	—	—	—	—	—	—
10	Mickey Whitehurst	1907–1908	14	12	1	1	0.893	—	—	—	—	—	—	—	—	—	—
11	Edward L. Greene	1909–1913	35	25	8	2	0.743	2	2	0	0.500	—	—	—	1	—	—
12	Jack Hegarty	1914–1915	13	5	6	2	0.462	0	4	1	0.100	—	—	—	0	—	—
13	Britain Patterson	1916	7	2	5	0	0.286	0	4	0	.000	—	—	—	0	—	—
14; 17	Harry Hartsell	1917; 1921–1923	38	16	18	4	0.474	4	11	4	0.316	—	—	—	0	—	—
15	Tal Stafford	1918	4	1	3	0	0.250	0	1	0	.000	—	—	—	0	—	—
16	Bill Fetzer	1919–1920	19	14	5	0	0.737	7	3	0	0.700	—	—	—	0	—	—
18	Buck Shaw^{†}	1924	10	2	6	2	0.300	1	4	1	0.250	—	—	—	0	—	—
19	Gus Tebell	1925–1929	48	21	25	2	0.458	5	16	2	0.261	—	—	—	1	—	—
20	John Van Liew	1930	10	2	8	0	0.200	1	5	0	0.167	—	—	—	0	—	—
21	Clipper Smith^{†}	1931–1933	27	10	12	5	0.463	5	9	1	0.367	—	—	—	0	—	—
22	Hunk Anderson^{†}	1934–1936	29	11	17	1	0.397	5	9	1	0.367	—	—	—	0	—	—
23	Williams Newton	1937–1943	69	24	39	6	0.391	19	24	6	0.449	—	—	—	0	—	—
24	Beattie Feathers	1944–1951	78	37	38	3	0.494	24	28	3	0.464	0	1	0	0	—	—
25	Horace Hendrickson	1952–1953	20	4	16	0	0.200	2	7	0	0.222	0	0	0	0	—	—
26	Earle Edwards	1954–1970	173	77	88	8	0.468	55	45	5	0.548	1	1	0	5	—	—
27	Al Michaels	1971	11	3	8	0	0.273	2	5	0	0.286	0	0	0	0	—	—
28	Lou Holtz^{†}	1972–1975	48	33	12	3	0.719	16	5	2	0.739	2	1	1	1	—	—
29	Bo Rein	1976–1979	46	27	18	1	0.598	15	8	0	0.652	2	0	0	1	—	—
30	Monte Kiffin	1980–1982	33	16	17	0	0.485	8	10	0	0.444	0	0	0	0	—	—
31	Tom Reed	1983–1985	33	9	24	0	0.273	4	17	0	0.190	0	0	0	0	—	—
32	Dick Sheridan^{†}	1986–1992	84	52	29	3	0.637	31	18	1	0.630	2	4	0	0	—	—
33	Mike O'Cain	1993–1999	81	41	40	0	0.506	26	30	0	0.464	1	2	0	0	—	—
34	Chuck Amato	2000–2006	86	49	37	—	0.570	25	31	—	0.446	4	1	—	0	—	—
35	Tom O'Brien	2007–2012	75	40	35	—	0.533	22	26	—	0.458	2	1	—	0	—	—
Int.	Dana Bible (Note: Bible served as interim head coach of the Wolfpack for the 2012 Music City Bowl after Tom O'Brien was fired at the conclusion of the 2012 regular season.)	2012	1	0	1	—	.000	0	0	—	–	0	1	—	0	—	—
36	Dave Doeren	2013–2026	172	98	74	—	0.570	52	57	—	0.477	4	6	—	0	—	—
