= Isidor Niflot =

American wrestler

Personal information
- Full name: Isidor Gadar Niflot
- Nickname: "Jack"
- Born: April 16, 1881 Russian Empire
- Died: March 29, 1950 (aged 68) Long Eddy, New York, U.S.
- Home town: New York, New York, U.S.
Medal record
Men's freestyle wrestling
Representing the United States
Olympic Games
Gold medal – first place	1904 St. Louis	Bantamweight

Isidor Gadar "Jack" Niflot (April 16, 1881 – March 29, 1950) was an American wrestler who competed in the 1904 Summer Olympics. He won a gold medal in the freestyle bantamweight category. Niflot was born in Russia and raised in New York, New York. He was later a long time Sullivan County, New York resident.

The bantamweight division was the third lightest freestyle wrestling weight class, held as part of the 1904 Summer Olympics programme. It was the first time the event, like all other freestyle wrestling events, was held in Olympic competition. Seven wrestlers competed, with Niflot winning the gold medal.
