= August Wester =

American wrestler

Personal information
- Full name: August Wester, Jr.
- Born: February 12, 1882 Newark, New Jersey, U.S.
- Died: September 1960 (aged 77–78) Irvington, New Jersey, U.S.
Medal record
Men's freestyle wrestling
Representing the United States
Olympic Games
Silver medal – second place	1904 St. Louis	Bantamweight

August Wester, Jr. (February 12, 1882 – September 1960) was an American wrestler who competed in the 1904 Summer Olympics. He won a silver medal in bantamweight category. He was born in Newark, New Jersey.
