= Bill Yoest =

American football player (born 1951)

No. 63
- Position: Offensive tackle

Personal information
- Born: November 26, 1951 (age 74); Pittsburgh, Pennsylvania, U.S.
- Listed height: 6 ft 0 in (1.83 m)
- Listed weight: 251 lb (114 kg)

Career information
- High school: North Catholic (Cranberry, Pennsylvania)
- College: NC State (1970–1973)
- NFL draft: 1974: undrafted

Career history
- Houston Texans (1974); Florida Blazers (1974)

Awards and highlights
- Consensus All-American (1973); 2× First-team All-ACC (1972, 1973); NC State Wolfpack No. 63 retired

Bill Yoest (born November 26, 1951) is an American former football offensive tackle who played college football for the NC State Wolfpack, where he was a consensus All-American in 1973. He played for the Houston Texans and the Florida Blazers of the World Football League (WFL).

== Early life ==
Yoest played high school football at North Catholic High School. He was named in the Pittsburgh Post-Gazette's 1968 All-Catholic team and named to the third team, Associated Press All-State.

== College career ==
Yoest was a four-year letterman for the NC State Wolfpack from 1970 to 1973. He was a consensus All-American in 1973. Yoest was a two-time first-team All-ACC selection and won the 1973 ACC Jacobs Blocking Trophy. He was selected to the 1974 Hula Bowl and the East–West Shrine Game, where he was elected co-captain of the East squad. Number 63 was retired in Yoest's honor by the NC State Wolfpack at halftime of the September 27, 2003 game against North Carolina.

== Professional career ==
Yoest spent one season in the WFL with the Houston Texans and the Florida Blazers.
