= Louis Strebler =

American wrestler

Personal information
- Full name: Louis Bernard Strebler
- Born: February 2, 1881 St. Louis, Missouri, U.S.
- Died: December 31, 1962 (aged 81) St. Louis, Missouri, U.S.
Medal record
Men's freestyle wrestling
Representing the United States
Olympic Games
Bronze medal – third place	1904 St. Louis	Bantamweight

Louis Bernard Strebler (February 2, 1881 – December 31, 1962) was an American wrestler who competed in the 1904 Summer Olympics. In 1904, he won a bronze medal in the bantamweight category. He also competed in the featherweight category, losing to Theodore McLear in the quarterfinals. His name is sometimes given as Z. B. Strebler, due to a typographical error.
