= Wrestling at the 1904 Summer Olympics – Men's freestyle bantamweight =

Men's bantamweight freestyle wrestling at the Games of the III Olympiad
- Venue: Francis Field
- Date: October 15, 1904
- Competitors: 7 from 1 nation

Medalists
1st place, gold medalist(s)		Isidor Niflot	United States
2nd place, silver medalist(s)		August Wester	United States
3rd place, bronze medalist(s)		Louis Strebler	United States

The bantamweight was the third lightest freestyle wrestling weight class held as part of the wrestling programme at the 1904 Summer Olympics. It included wrestlers weighing 115 to 125 pounds (52.2 to 56.7 kg). It was the first time the event, like all other freestyle wrestling events, was held in Olympic competition. Seven wrestlers competed.

== Results ==
Louis Strebler and John Cardwell were allowed to fight for the bronze medal as they both lost in this tournament against the gold medalist Isidor Niflot.

First Round
Fall (1:13)
Milton Whitehurst (USA)
Frederick Ferguson (CAN)
August Wester (USA)
Charles Stevens (USA)
Fall (3:12)
Isidor Niflot (USA)
Louis Strebler (USA)

Semi-finals
Decision
Milton Whitehurst (USA)
August Wester (USA)
Fall (2:24)
Isidor Niflot (USA)
John Cardwell (USA)

Final
Fall (1:58)
August Wester (USA) (silver)
Isidor Niflot (USA) (gold)
Third place
Louis Strebler (USA) (bronze)
John Cardwell (USA)

== Sources ==
- Wudarski, Pawel (1999). "Wyniki Igrzysk Olimpijskich" (in Polish).
