= NC State Wolfpack football =

College Football Bowl Subdivision team; member of Atlantic Coast Conference

2026 NC State Wolfpack football team
- First season: 1892; 134 years ago
- Athletic director: Boo Corrigan
- General manager: Andrew Vaughn
- Head coach: Todd Goebbel (Interim); 1st season, 1–2 (.333)
- Location: Raleigh, North Carolina, U.S.
- Stadium: Carter–Finley Stadium (capacity: 56,919)
- NCAA division: Division I FBS
- Conference: ACC
- Colors: Red and white
- All-time record: 652–613–55 (.515)
- Bowl record: 18–18–1 (.500)

Conference championships
- SAIAA: 1907, 1910, 1913 SoCon: 1927 ACC: 1957, 1963, 1964, 1965, 1968, 1973, 1979
- Consensus All-Americans: 12
- Rivalries: Clemson (rivalry); East Carolina (rivalry); Duke (rivalry); North Carolina (rivalry); Wake Forest (rivalry)

Uniforms
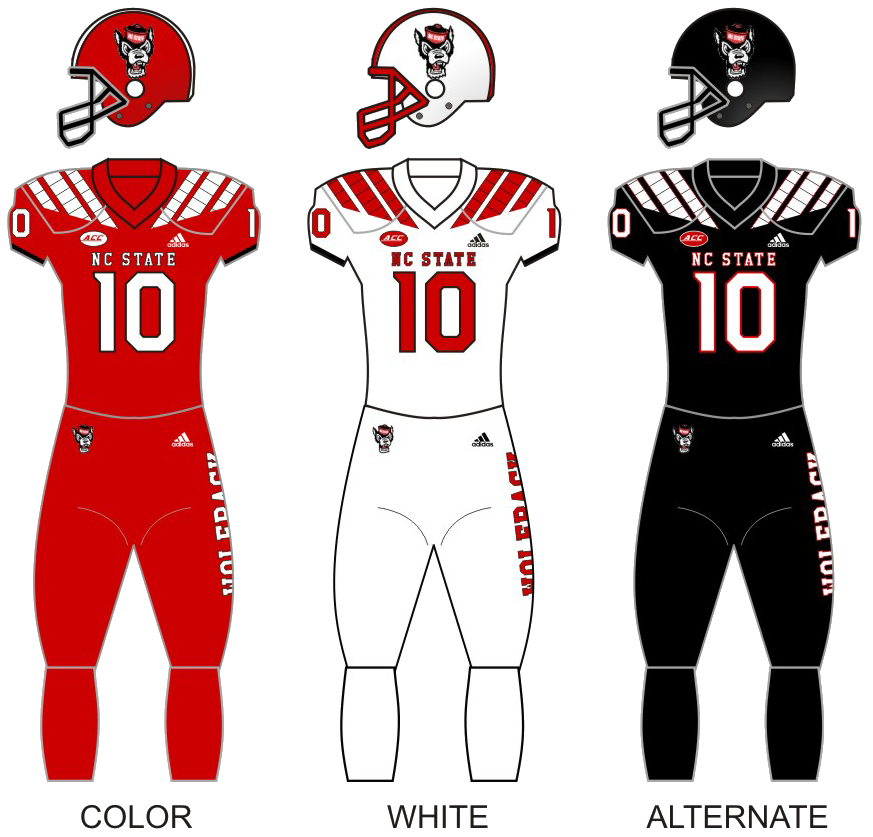
- Fight song: NC State Fight Song
- Mascot: Mr. and Ms. Wuf
- Marching band: The Power Sound of the South
- Outfitter: Adidas
- Website: GoPack.com

The NC State Wolfpack football team represents North Carolina State University in the sport of American football. The Wolfpack competes in the NCAA Division I Football Bowl Subdivision (FBS) of the National Collegiate Athletic Association (NCAA) and the Atlantic Coast Conference (ACC). Prior to joining the ACC in 1953, the Wolfpack were a member of the Southern Conference. As a founding member of the ACC, the Wolfpack has won seven conference championships and participated in 34 bowl games, of which the team has won 17. NC State was coached by Dave Doeren, until he was fired.

Since 1966, the Wolfpack has played its home games at Carter–Finley Stadium, the largest college football stadium in North Carolina. On September 16, 2010, NC State restored the tradition of having a live mascot on the field. A wolf-like Tamaskan Dog named "Tuffy" was on the sidelines for the Cincinnati game that day in Raleigh and Tuffy has not missed a Wolfpack football game in Carter–Finley Stadium since.

== History ==
=== Early history (1892–1953) ===
NC State (then known as The North Carolina College of Agriculture and Mechanic Arts) played its first football game against a team from the Raleigh Male Academy on March 12, 1892, in what is now Pullen Park.

The team's first head coach was Perrin Busbee, who led the team during that game. The Aggies, whose colors were blue and pink, won 12–6 in front of more than 200 spectators. The following year, the school played its first intercollegiate game: a 12–6 victory over the University of Tennessee. The program's long-standing rivalry with nearby University of North Carolina at Chapel Hill began on October 12, 1894, with a 44–0 UNC victory in Chapel Hill. Eight days later, the team (then called the Farmers) lost again to UNC, 16–0 in Raleigh. In 1895, under third-year coach Bart Gatling, the team finished 2–2–1 and wore red and white uniforms for the first time. Over the next five seasons the program continued to try to establish itself, achieving only one winning season during the period. The football team has also only had scholarship football players since 1933, prior to that all Wolfpack athletics consisted entirely of non-scholarship student athletes. In 1906, in a game against Randolph-Macon in Raleigh, the Farmers attempted their first forward pass, a play that had only recently become legal and at the time was still considered a "trick" play. The following season was the program's most successful yet. Under coach Mickey Whitehurst, A&M won the South Atlantic Intercollegiate Athletic Association championship with a 6–0–1 record. That season, the program also recorded its first ever victory over Virginia. The Farmers played their home games that season on campus at the New Athletic Park, which would later be known as Riddick Stadium. In addition to Pullen Park, the state fairgrounds had hosted some games prior to the opening of the new stadium.

The team won a second South Atlantic championship in 1910 under coach Edward Green, finishing with a record of 4–0–2. A win over Virginia Tech in Norfolk that season was dubbed the "biggest game ever played in the South". Coach Green led team to a third conference championship in 1913, with a record of 6–1. The 1918 season, which was the school's first season with the name North Carolina State College of Agriculture and Engineering, was cut short due to the United States' entrance into World War I and a severe flu outbreak on campus. The team's roster was depleted, its schedule reduced to four games, and practice was suspended for five weeks in October and November. A week after practice resumed, State College, as the school was then called, led by coach Tal Stafford, was defeated 128–0 by Georgia Tech in Atlanta. Tackle John Ripple was named the program's first All-American. The following season, on October 23, the Farmers resumed play with North Carolina after a 14-year hiatus. The Tar Heels won the game 13–12 in Raleigh. It wasn't until 1920 that A&M defeated the rival Tar Heels for the first time. In 1921 State College began wearing red sweaters and were referred to by the local media as the Wolfpack.

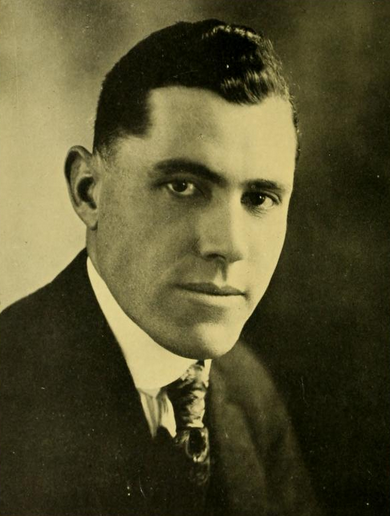
Coach Harry Hartsell (1917, 1921-23)

The program, led by coach Harry Hartsell at the time, joined the Southern Conference that year and would win the conference title six seasons later under coach Gus Tebell, finishing the year with a 9–1 record. Running back Jack McDowall was the team's star player that year. The 1930 season saw the installation of field lighting at Riddick Stadium, as the Wolfpack defeated High Point University, 37–0, in the team's first ever night game. Williams Newton took over as State's head coach in 1937, and under his tutelage the team compiled a record of 24–39–6. Under Newton, State employed a ground-oriented, hard nose attack that put pressure on the opposing interior linemen. Recruitment became difficult during at least part of his tenure as head coach due to the fact that World War II necessitated that eligible males over 18 be inducted into the U.S. military. Newton left NC State after seven seasons to accept the head football coach position at South Carolina.

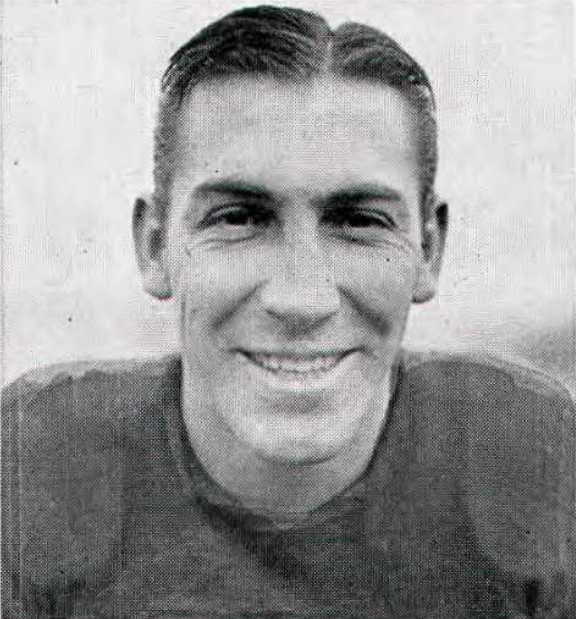
Coach Beattie Feathers (1944-51)

In 1944, State hired former Appalachian State head coach Beattie Feathers as the Wolfpack head football coach. Feathers, a former star at Tennessee and the first NFL running back to rush for 1,000 yards in a season, compiled a 37–38–8 record in eight seasons, the program's most successful coaching tenure yet. In Feathers' second season, Wolfpack defensive player Howard "Touchdown" Turner returned an interception 105 yards against Duke, a record that still stands as the longest play in Wolfpack history. The 1946 season began with wins over Duke and Clemson, earning the program their first appearance in the UPI poll (19th). The next year, NC State reached their first ever bowl game, the second annual Gator Bowl. The team lost to Oklahoma, 34–13, and finished the season at 8–3, the highest win total since finishing 9–1 in 1927. 1947 saw the Wolfpack finish 5–3–1. That season was followed by a 3–6–1 campaign in 1948, a 3–7 mark in 1949 and a 5–4–1 record in 1950. The Wolfpack's first ever nationally televised game was played in 1950. State defeated eighth-ranked Maryland 16–13 in College Park. The game aired on the now-defunct Dumont Television Network. After a 3–7 campaign in 1951, Feathers was relieved of his duties as head coach. Horace Hendrickson was promoted from assistant coach to head coach after Feathers' departure. Under Hendrickson's tutelage, the Wolfpack struggled, compiling a record of 4–16. Hendrickson was fired after two seasons due to the team's struggles. NC State joined the newly formed Atlantic Coast Conference in 1953 as a charter member, leaving the Southern Conference after 29 years of membership. The team, which had finished 3–7 in 1952, finished 1–9 that year under head coach Hendrickson.

=== Earle Edwards era (1954–1971) ===
Earle Edwards was hired as the team's head coach before the 1954 season. Edwards had previously been an assistant at Michigan State under Biggie Munn and at Penn State under Bob Higgins. Edwards' teams compiled a record of 77–88–8. Edwards is the longest tenured coach in NC State Wolfpack football history and holds the program records for games coached, wins, and losses. His teams won five Atlantic Coast Conference titles and made two Liberty Bowl appearances. Four times he was named the ACC Coach of the Year. Edwards produced eight All-Americans: Dick Christy, halfback (1957), Roman Gabriel, quarterback (1960, 1961), Don Montgomery, defensive end (1963), Dennis Byrd, defensive tackle (1966, 1967), Fred Combs, defensive back (1967), Gerald Warren, kicker (1967), Ron Carpenter, defensive tackle (1968), and Cary Metts, center, (1968). Though Edwards' tenure wasn't overly successful from a record standpoint, it was the most successful tenure of any head coach to that point and laid the foundation for future successes to occur. Edwards retired after seventeen seasons as the Wolfpack's head football coach on June 25, 1971.

After Edwards' retirement, State promoted Al Michaels from assistant coach to head coach. Things didn't pan out for Michaels, as the Wolfpack compiled a 3–8 record in his only year as head coach. Michaels was fired after just one season.

=== Lou Holtz era (1972–1975) ===
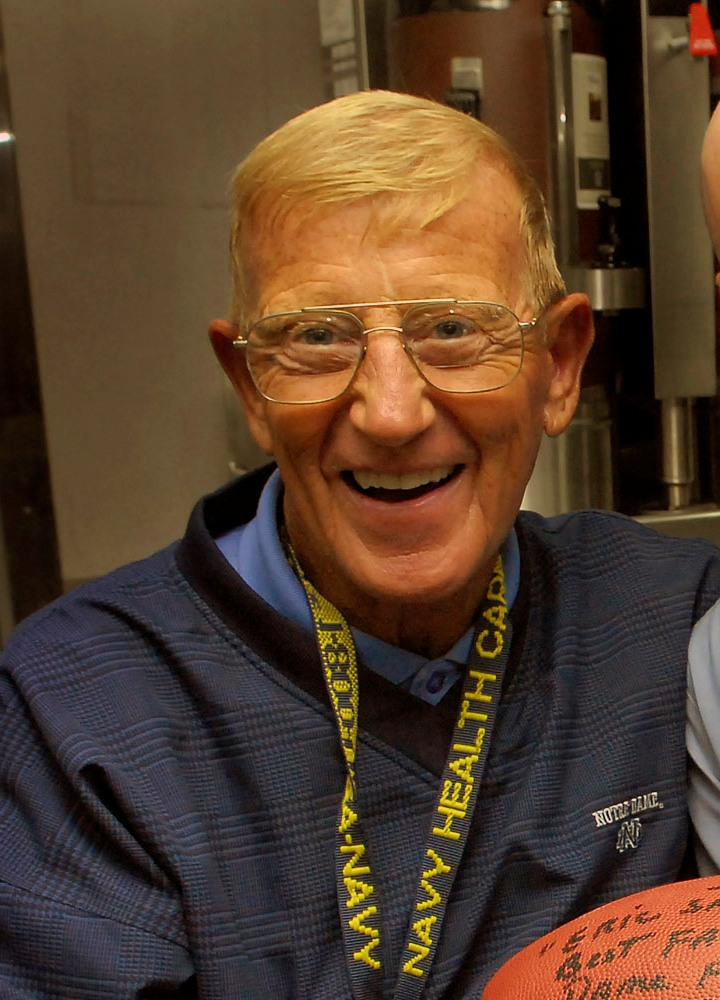
Coach Lou Holtz (1972-75)

In 1972, State hired Lou Holtz away from William & Mary as head coach. Holtz had a 33–12–3 record in four seasons at NC State. His Wolfpack teams played in four bowl games, going 2–1–1. Holtz's 1972 team finished 8–3–1, won the Peach Bowl over West Virginia and finished the season ranked No. 17 in the final AP poll. Holtz's 1973 team finished 9–3, won the Liberty Bowl and finished the season ranked No. 16 in the final AP poll. The 1974 team finished 9–2–1, tied Houston in the Bluebonnet Bowl and finished the season ranked No. 9 in the Coaches' poll and No. 11 in the AP poll. Holtz departed the Wolfpack after four seasons to become head coach of the NFL's New York Jets.

=== Bo Rein era (1976–1979) ===
When Holtz moved on, Bo Rein, the offensive coordinator at Arkansas, became the youngest college football head coach upon his hiring by North Carolina State. Guiding the Wolfpack football team, Rein was an advocate of the coaching philosophy of Ohio State's Woody Hayes for whom Rein played. During Rein's four years at NC State, he led the team to two bowl games, defeating Iowa State in the 1977 Peach Bowl and defeating the Pittsburgh in the 1978 Tangerine Bowl. In Rein's final year at NC State, his team won the Wolfpack's last ACC title to date. Despite winning the conference title, the Wolfpack were not invited to a bowl–as of the end of the 1979 season, the last bowl-eligible conference champion from a power conference to not take part in a bowl game. Among Rein's top players at NC State were Outland Trophy winner Jim Ritcher, a center for the Wolfpack who later started at guard on four Super Bowl teams with the Buffalo Bills, and linebacker Bill Cowher, who later served as head coach of the NFL's Pittsburgh Steelers for 15 seasons and won Super Bowl XL. Following the 1979 season, Rein resigned as head football coach at State to accept the same position at LSU, but Rein died in a plane crash before ever coaching a game for the Tigers. Following every season, the NC State football team awards the "Bo Rein Award" to a player that makes a vital contribution in an unsung role.

=== Monte Kiffin era (1980–1982) ===
After Rein's departure, NC State hired Arkansas defensive coordinator Monte Kiffin, father of LSU and former Ole Miss, Florida Atlantic, Oakland Raiders, Tennessee and USC head coach Lane Kiffin, as head coach. Kiffin served three seasons at State and his teams compiled a 16–17 record. Kiffin's defensive coordinator during his three seasons at NCSU was Pete Carroll. Kiffin decided to leave NCSU after three seasons to pursue coaching opportunities in the NFL.

=== Tom Reed era (1983–1985) ===
Tom Reed was hired away from Miami (OH) to take over as head coach of the Wolfpack after Kiffin's departure. State struggled under Reed's leadership, posting three consecutive 3–8 yearly records en route to a 9–24 overall mark. Under mounting pressure from fans, alumni and the school administration, Reed resigned after the 1985 season.

=== Dick Sheridan era (1986–1992) ===
State chose Dick Sheridan, head coach at Furman, to take over as head coach of the Wolfpack football program in late 1986. Under the tutelage of coach Sheridan, the Wolfpack compiled a record of 52–29–3. State made six bowl appearances (two wins) and finished ranked in either the AP or Coaches poll three times. Sheridan retired unexpectedly after seven seasons, citing health concerns and emotional issues.

=== Mike O'Cain era (1993–1999) ===
Mike O'Cain was promoted from quarterbacks coach to head coach after Sheridan's retirement. Under O'Cain, the Wolfpack compiled a record of 41–40. O'Cain's seven-year tenure saw three bowl appearances, including a win in the 1994 Peach Bowl. The latter part of O'Cain's tenure saw mostly mediocre teams. His 1995 and 1996 teams finished with 3–8 records, and although the Wolfpack improved to finish 6–5, 7–5 and 6–6 the next three years, he went 0–7 against archrival North Carolina. NCSU fired O'Cain after the 1999 season.

=== Chuck Amato era (2000–2006) ===
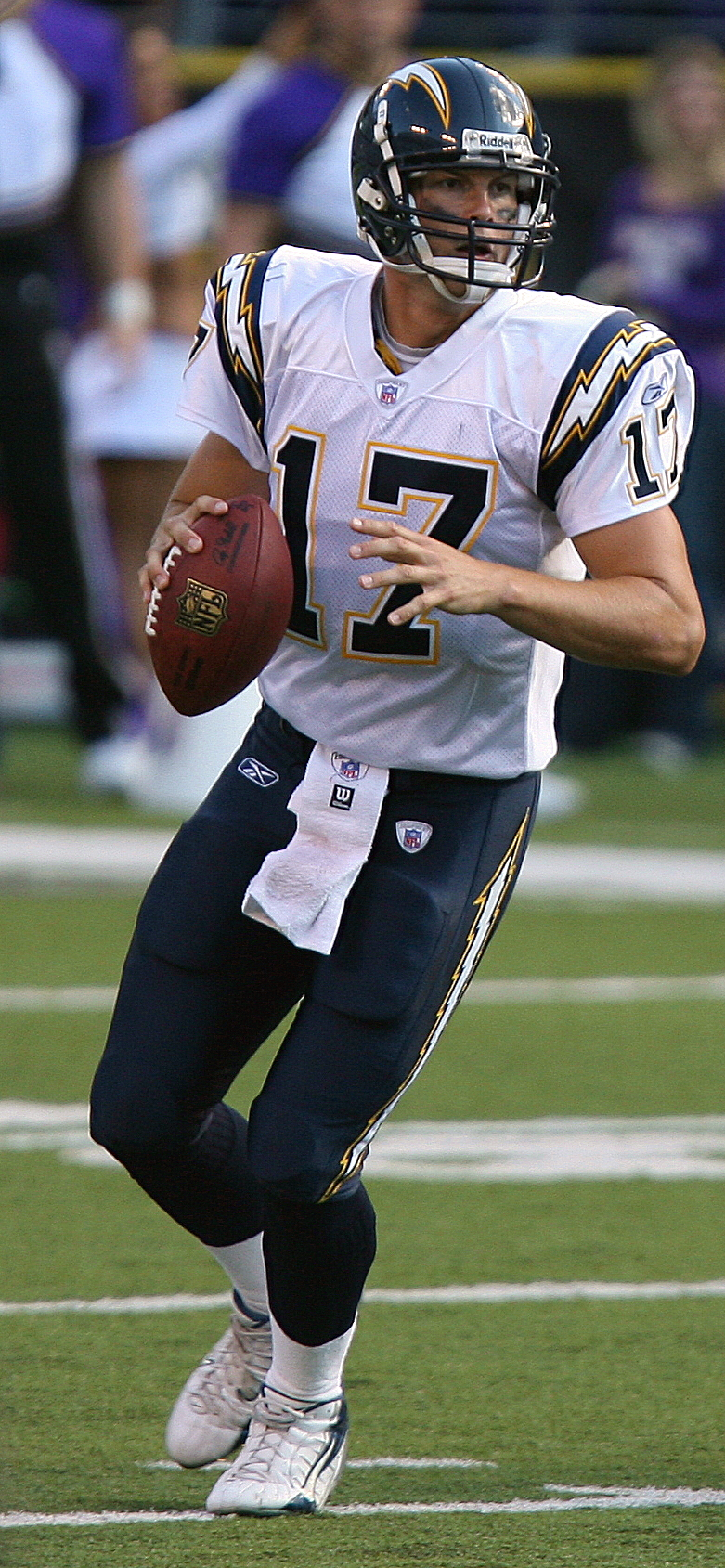
Philip Rivers played at NCSU from 2000 to 2003

In 2000, longtime college football assistant and NCSU alum Chuck Amato was hired as State's head football coach. Although Amato had no head coaching or coordinating experience, NCSU felt that Amato's 18-year tenure as defensive line coach under Bobby Bowden at Florida State, winning two national championships, would help boost recruiting, ticket sales, and program prestige.

Amato accumulated an overall record of 49–37, including a record of 34–17 during the four-year period from 2000 through 2003 while Philip Rivers was the Wolfpack's starting quarterback. Amato's most successful season was in 2002 when the Wolfpack won a school-record 11 games and defeated Notre Dame in the Gator Bowl. That team finished ranked No. 12 in the AP poll, their highest final ranking in 29 years. Amato's tenure in Raleigh crested after Rivers graduated and left for the NFL. The Wolfpack finished 5–6 in 2004, 7–5 in 2005, and 3–9 in 2006. On November 26, 2006, Amato was fired by NC State athletics director Lee Fowler after a seven–game losing streak capped off the 2006 season. Noted losses include an upset by Akron, a third straight loss to archrival North Carolina, and a loss at home to East Carolina. Highlights of the 2006 season include wins against Boston College and Florida State. In a statement, Fowler acknowledged Amato's "excitement and enthusiasm." He continued, "This enthusiasm fueled an $87 million renovation to Carter–Finley Stadium." Nonetheless, mediocre 2005 and 2006 seasons led to the decision "to take the program in a new direction." Even with Rivers as quarterback, Amato's teams never won more than five games in conference play, and actually finished six games under .500 in ACC play.

=== Tom O'Brien era (2007–2012) ===
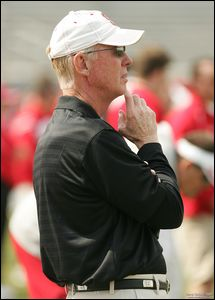
Coach Tom O'Brien (2007-12)

Tom O'Brien was hired away from Boston College and named NCSU head football coach in December 2006. He inherited a team that had gone 3–9 and lost its last seven games. In his first year, after opening the season 1–5, his team pulled together and won four straight games, including a win over 18th-ranked Virginia and tough road wins at East Carolina and Miami. Despite the slow start, his first Wolfpack squad went into the season finale with a bowl bid on the line.

The 2008 season will go down as one of the best of O'Brien's tenure, as the Wolfpack became the first in Atlantic Coast Conference history to start the season 0–4 in league play and finish 4–0, with an overall record of 6–7. The bid to the Papajohns.com Bowl marked the ninth bowl invitation in the past 10 years for O'Brien. His freshman quarterback, Russell Wilson, who would go on to become a Super Bowl winning quarterback for the NFL's Seattle Seahawks, became the first rookie in the history of the Atlantic Coast Conference to be named first-team all-conference at his position and it marked the sixth time in his 19 years in the league that a quarterback under O'Brien's tutelage was named the All-ACC signal caller. In 2009, the Wolfpack posted wins over Pittsburgh of the Big East and a third-straight win over North Carolina, but was decimated by injuries and finished the season 5–7.

After being picked to finish fourth in the Atlantic Division in the preseason in 2010, the Wolfpack finished with a record of 9–4 and tied for second in the ACC, was one game away from playing for an ACC title and was the third league team picked in the bowl selections. O'Brien's squad was the first Wolfpack team to garner nine wins since 2003 posted State's first winning season in five years. With the Champs Sports Bowl victory over West Virginia, the 2010 squad tied the second highest win total in school history while finishing 9–4. In 2011, led by future Tampa Bay Buccaneers starting quarterback Mike Glennon, the Wolfpack had an 8–5 record.

On November 25, 2012, O'Brien received notice from NC State that he had been dismissed effective immediately despite navigating the team to a 7–5 regular-season record. Athletic director Debbie Yow cited several reasons. She was concerned over lagging season-ticket sales, as well as his approach to recruiting. O'Brien's recruiting classes were frequently in the bottom half of the nation, and Yow wanted a coach who could bring top 25-type talent to Raleigh. NCSU was obligated to pay $1.2 million of non-state funds to O'Brien, as his contract ran through the 2015 season. NCSU ultimately paid O'Brien only $200,000 after the buyout was renegotiated so he could become an assistant at Virginia.

=== Dave Doeren era (2013–2026) ===
On December 1, 2012, Debbie Yow announced that Northern Illinois head coach Dave Doeren would be the new head coach of the Wolfpack. His initial signed contract paid $1.8 million annually. In Doeren's first season at the helm, the Wolfpack compiled a record of 3–9 and failed to win an ACC game. In his second season, they improved to 8–5 (one of the fastest turnarounds in school history), and won the 2014 St. Petersburg Bowl. They also posted a decisive 35–7 win against archrival North Carolina. Doeren accomplished all this with the 3rd youngest team in the nation.

The next year, Doeren's team finished 7–6, losing the 2015 Belk Bowl. The team was led by quarterback Jacoby Brissett, who was eventually selected by the New England Patriots in the 2016 NFL draft. For the 2016 season, the Wolfpack again finished 7–6. NC State began the season with a victory over William & Mary. After losing the following week to East Carolina, State won three straight, defeating Old Dominion, Wake Forest and Notre Dame (in a game infamously played during Hurricane Matthew). NC State would then lose four games in a row, first in a heartbreaker against No. 3 Clemson, then to No. 7 Louisville, and finally to Boston College and No. 19 Florida State. The Wolfpack would close the season with a win over Syracuse, a loss to Miami, a victory in the regular season finale against archrival North Carolina and a win over Vanderbilt in the Independence Bowl in Shreveport, Louisiana. On Thursday, October 5, 2017, at 8:00 pm, NC State played Louisville where quarterbacks Ryan Finley (NCSU) and Lamar Jackson (LOU) faced off in front of a national TV audience on ESPN College Football Thursday Primetime. Ryan Finley threw the football for 367 yards and Lamar Jackson threw the football for 354 yards. NC State won its first ACC divisional match-up against Louisville, with a final score of 39–25. On February 24, 2022, Doeren and NC State agreed to terms on a raise and contract extension that would keep the coach in Raleigh through 2026.

From 2021 to 2025, Dave Doeren's teams defeated arch-rival UNC 5 consecutive times. He amassed an overall 9-4 record against the in state rival.

Dave Doeren was fired by the Wolfpack on October 24, 2026, after a disappointing 3-4 start to the season, including blowout losses to ACC foes Virginia and Wake Forest.

=== Philip Rivers era (2026–) ===
On November 13, 2026, athletic director Boo Corrigan announced that former star quarterback Philip Rivers had signed a five-year contract to coach the Wolfpack beginning with the 2027 season. Rivers will receive $3.25 million per year in base pay, roughly half of Doeren's final annual salary.

== Conference affiliations ==
NC State has been both independent and affiliated with multiple conferences.

- Independent (1892–1897)
- Southern Intercollegiate Athletic Association (1898–1906)
- South Atlantic Intercollegiate Athletic Association (1907–1921)
- Southern Conference (1922–1952)
- Atlantic Coast Conference (1953–present)

== Championships ==
=== Conference championships ===
NC State has won 11 conference championships in three different conferences.

Year	Conference	Coach	Record	Conf. Record
1907	South Atlantic Intercollegiate Athletic Association	Mickey Whitehurst	6–0–1	5–0–0
1910	South Atlantic Intercollegiate Athletic Association	Eddie Green	4–0–2	2–0–2
1913	South Atlantic Intercollegiate Athletic Association	Eddie Green	6–1	2–0
1927	Southern Conference	Gus Tebell	9–1	4–0
1957	Atlantic Coast Conference	Earle Edwards	7–1–2	5–0–1
1963†	Atlantic Coast Conference	Earle Edwards	8–3	6–1
1964	Atlantic Coast Conference	Earle Edwards	5–5	5–2
1965†	Atlantic Coast Conference	Earle Edwards	6–4	5–2‡
1968	Atlantic Coast Conference	Earle Edwards	6–4	6–1
1973	Atlantic Coast Conference	Lou Holtz	9–3	6–0
1979	Atlantic Coast Conference	Bo Rein	7–4	5–1

† Co-champion
‡ On-field record was 4–3, but adjusted to 5–2 due to South Carolina's use of an ineligible player, resulting in an ACC co-championship

== Head coaches ==
There have been 33 head coaches at NC State.

Years	Coach	ACC Record	Overall Record	Pct.
1892, 1896–97	Perrin Busbee	—	3–2–0	.600
1893–95	Bart Gatling	—	3–4–1	.437
1898–99	W. C. Riddick	—	1–3–2	.333
1900–01	John McKee	—	1–6–0	.143
1902–03	Art Devlin	—	7–8–2	.471
1904	Willis Kienholz	—	3–1–2	.667
1905	George S. Whitney	—	4–1–1	.750
1906	Willie Heston	—	3–1–4	.625
1907–08	Mickey Whitehurst	—	12–1–1	.893
1909–13	Eddie Green	—	25–8–2	.743
1914–15	Jack Hegarty	—	5–6–2	.461
1916	Brit Patterson	—	2–5–0	.286
1917, 1921–23	Harry Hartsell	—	16–18–4	.474
1918	Tal Stafford	—	1–3–0	.250
1919–20	Bill Fetzer	—	14–5–0	.737
1924	Buck Shaw	—	2–6–2	.300
1925–29	Gus Tebell	—	21–25–2	.479
1930	John Van Liew	—	2–8–0	.200
1931–33	Clipper Smith	—	10–12–5	.463
1934–36	Hunk Anderson	—	11–17–1	.396
1937–43	Williams Newton	—	24–39–6	.391
1944–51	Beattie Feathers	—	37–38–3	.494
1952–53	Horace Hendrickson	0–3–0	4–16–0	.200
1954–70	Earle Edwards	55–45–5	77–88–8	.468
1971	Al Michaels	2–5–0	3–8–0	.273
1972–75	Lou Holtz	16–5–2	33–12–3	.719
1976–79	Bo Rein	15–8–0	27–18–1	.619
1980–82	Monte Kiffin	8–10–0	16–17–0	.485
1983–85	Tom Reed	4–17–0	9–24–0	.273
1986–92	Dick Sheridan	31–18–1	52–29–3	.637
1993–99	Mike O'Cain	26–30–0	41–40–0	.506
2000–06	Chuck Amato	25–31–0	49–37–0	.570
2007–12	Tom O'Brien	22–26–0	40–35–0	.533
2013–26	Dave Doeren	47–51–0	87–65–0	.572

== Bowl games ==
NC State has participated in 38 bowl games as of the conclusion of the 2025 season, amassing a record of 19–18–1.

No.	Date	Bowl	Opponent	Result
1	January 1, 1947	Gator Bowl	Oklahoma	L 13–34
2	December 21, 1963	Liberty Bowl	Mississippi State	L 12–16
3	December 16, 1967	Liberty Bowl	Georgia	W 14–7
4	December 29, 1972	Peach Bowl	West Virginia	W 49–13
5	December 17, 1973	Liberty Bowl	Kansas	W 31–18
6	December 23, 1974	Bluebonnet Bowl	Houston	T 31–31
7	December 31, 1975	Peach Bowl	West Virginia	L 10–13
8	December 31, 1977	Peach Bowl	Iowa State	W 24–14
9	December 23, 1978	Tangerine Bowl	Pittsburgh	W 30–17
10	December 31, 1986	Peach Bowl	Virginia Tech	L 24–25
11	December 31, 1988	Peach Bowl	Iowa	W 28–23
12	December 31, 1989	Copper Bowl	Arizona	L 10–17
13	December 28, 1990	All-American Bowl	Southern Miss	W 31–27
14	January 1, 1992	Peach Bowl	East Carolina	L 34–37
15	December 31, 1992	Gator Bowl	Florida	L 10–27
16	January 1, 1994	Hall of Fame Bowl	Michigan	L 7–42
17	January 1, 1995	Peach Bowl	Mississippi State	W 28–24
18	December 29, 1998	Micron PC Bowl	Miami (FL)	L 23–46
19	December 28, 2000	MicronPC.com Bowl	Minnesota	W 38–30
20	December 20, 2001	Tangerine Bowl	Pittsburgh	L 19–34
21	January 1, 2003	Gator Bowl	Notre Dame	W 28–6
22	December 22, 2003	Tangerine Bowl	Kansas	W 56–26
23	December 31, 2005	Meineke Car Care Bowl	South Florida	W 14–0
24	December 29, 2008	PapaJohns.com Bowl	Rutgers	L 23–29
25	December 28, 2010	Champs Sports Bowl	West Virginia	W 23–7
26	December 27, 2011	Belk Bowl	Louisville	W 31–24
27	December 31, 2012	Music City Bowl	Vanderbilt	L 24–38
28	December 26, 2014	St. Petersburg Bowl	UCF	W 34–27
29	December 30, 2015	Belk Bowl	Mississippi State	L 28–51
30	December 26, 2016	Independence Bowl	Vanderbilt	W 41–17
31	December 29, 2017	Sun Bowl	Arizona State	W 52–31
32	December 31, 2018	Gator Bowl	Texas A&M	L 13–52
33	January 2, 2021	Gator Bowl	Kentucky	L 21–23
34	December 28, 2021	Holiday Bowl	UCLA	Canceled
35	December 30, 2022	Duke's Mayo Bowl	Maryland	L 12–16
36	December 28, 2023	Pop-Tarts Bowl	Kansas State	L 19–28
37	December 28, 2024	Military Bowl	East Carolina	L 21–26
38	December 19, 2025	Gasparilla Bowl	Memphis	W 31–7

== Final poll rankings ==
NC State rankings in final AP and Coaches polls.

Year	Record	Final AP Poll Rank	Final Coaches Poll Rank
1946	8–3–0	18	—
1947	5–3–1	17	—
1957	7–1–2	15	20
1967	9–2–0	—	17
1972	8–3–1	17	—
1973	9–3–0	16	—
1974	9–2–1	11	9
1977	8–4–0	—	19
1978	9–3–0	18	19
1988	8–3–1	—	17
1991	9–3–0	24	25
1992	9–3–1	17	15
1994	9–3–0	17	17
2002	11–3	12	11
2010	9–4	25	25
2017	9–4	23	23
2021	9–3	20	19
2023	9–4	21	21

== Facilities ==
=== Riddick Stadium ===
From 1891 until 1907, the school's first teams played on the open fields that surrounded campus, either at Pullen Park, at the old North Carolina State Fairgrounds or on the farm tracts on the "other" side of the railroad tracks. In 1907, faculty members, alumni and students began collecting money to enclose a large tract of land behind the Main Building that would become the home of the football and baseball teams. The Aggies played their first game there against Randolph Macon, recording a 20–0 win. Wooden grandstands slowly rose on the site, and it was named Riddick Field in 1912, after popular professor W.C. Riddick, who is remembered as the father of athletics at the school.

The stadium did not age gracefully. At its height, it only had 14,000 permanent seats and never held more than 23,000 seats total.

=== Carter–Finley Stadium ===
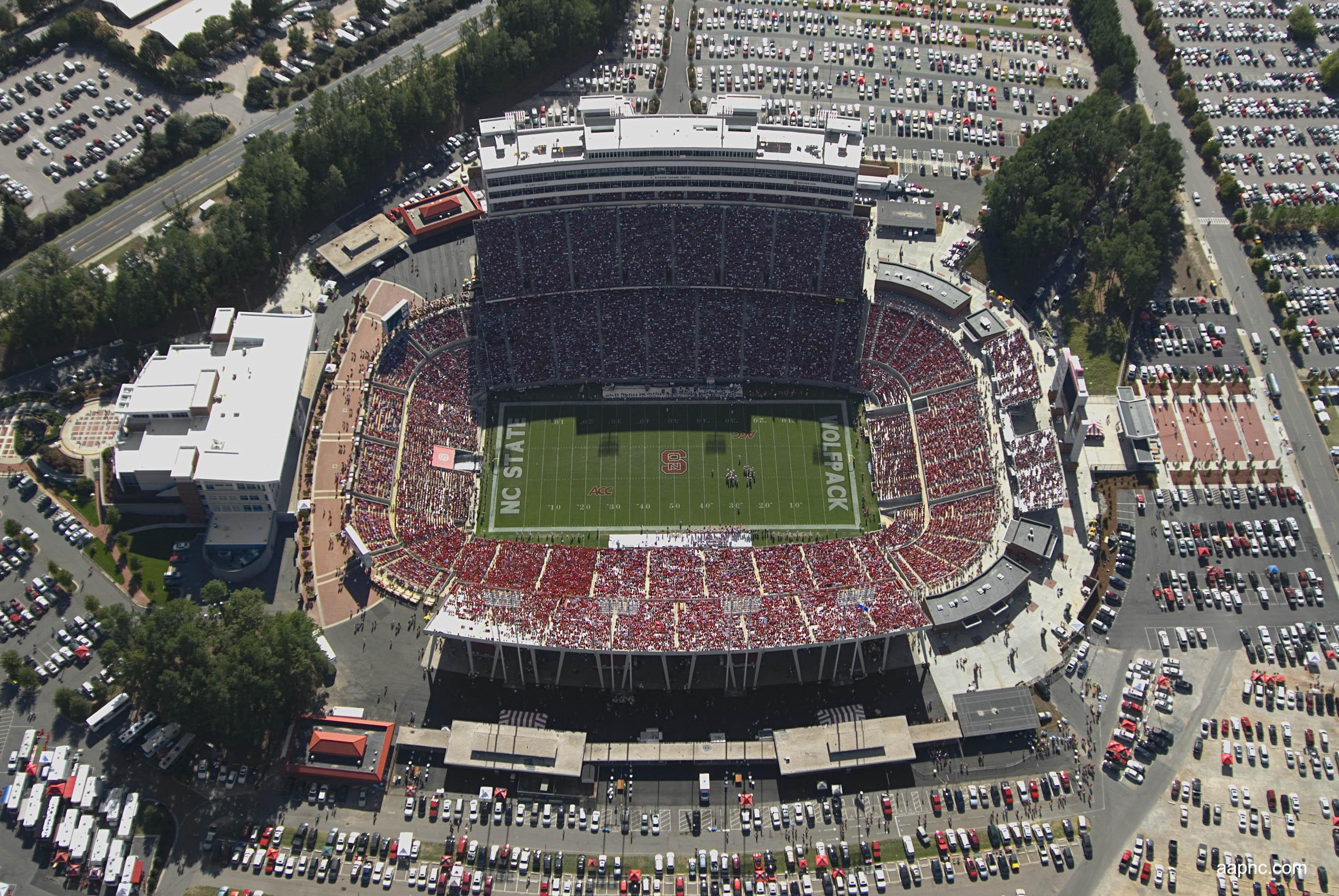
Carter–Finley Stadium opened in 1966.

Although Riddick Stadium was considered obsolete as early as the 1950s, it wasn't until 1966 that Riddick was replaced with a much more modern stadium. It was named Carter Stadium in honor of Harry C. & Wilbert J. "Nick" Carter, both graduates of the university. They were major contributors to the original building of the stadium. In 1979, it became Carter–Finley Stadium, named after Albert E. Finley, another major philanthropist and contributor to the university. The stadium's seating capacity is 56,919.

Carter-Finley has been the home to some of the school's most decorated athletes: Gerald Warren, Dennis Byrd, the Buckey twins (Don and Dave), ACC-career rushing leader Ted Brown, Joe McIntosh, Erik Kramer, Jamie Barnette, Torry Holt, ACC-passing leader Philip Rivers, NFL No. 1 pick Mario Williams, and Russell Wilson.

On October 8, 2016, NC State celebrated its 50th season at Carter–Finley Stadium with a dramatic 10–3 win over Notre Dame Fighting Irish in the driving rain in the middle of Hurricane Matthew. NC State boasted a 2–0 record against the Fighting Irish, winning both of their meetings up to that time by a combined score of 38–9. In both games, Notre Dame had yet to score a touchdown against the Wolfpack.

== Mascot ==
Since the 1960s, the Wolfpack has been represented at athletic events by its mascots, Mr. and Ms. Wuf. In print, the 'Strutting Wolf' is used and is known by the name 'Tuffy.' In September 2010, a purebred Tamaskan Dog became the new live mascot.

== Rivalries ==
=== Clemson ===
Bordering state rival Clemson leads the all-time series over NC State 60–31–1 through the 2023 season. The name of the rivalry is derived from the textile industry which has historical importance to the economies of both North Carolina and South Carolina and the fact that both schools are among the largest university-level textile schools in the world. Both NC State and Clemson were members of the Atlantic Division of the Atlantic Coast Conference, and thus played each other every year. The rivalry game is no longer protected in the expanded ACC and therefore will not be played every year going forward. The two schools did play during the 2023 season in Raleigh, with NC State emerging victorious, 24-17, and at Clemson during the 2024 season with Clemson winning 59-35. The Wolfpack has now split two out of the last four meetings against the Tigers.

=== Duke ===
This game is part of the larger Tobacco Road rivalry between North Carolina Power 5 universities NC State, North Carolina, Duke and Wake Forest. The series with Duke dates back to 1924 and was played every year uninterrupted from then until 2003 except for 1944. After the Atlantic Coast Conference split into non-geographical divisions in 2004, the Wolfpack and Blue Devils were placed in opposite divisions and weren't designated as each other's annual cross divisional opponent, thereby ending the annual series and making the rivalry intermittent. With the ACC ending the divisional format after the 2022 season in favor of an arrangement that calls for three annual conference opponents with five rotating, the four North Carolina schools were designated as all three of each other's annual conference opponents, thus reviving the annual series between the Wolfpack and Blue Devils for the foreseeable future. Duke dominated the early years of the rivalry but NC State has won 15 of 20 since 1990. Duke leads the all-time series 43–37–5.

=== East Carolina ===
NC State leads the all-time series with non-Tobacco Road in-state rival East Carolina 20–14 with the most recent game being played in 2025, which resulted in NC State beating East Carolina 24-17 in Raleigh, NC. The NC State and East Carolina rivalry dates back to the first meeting between the two schools in 1970, when they began playing on an annual basis which lasted until 1987. Both schools have other larger and more prominent rivalries, but this series does stir up passion in both Greenville and Raleigh. NC State has won 4 out of the last 5 meetings against the Pirates.

=== North Carolina ===
This game is part of the larger Tobacco Road rivalry between North Carolina Power 5 universities NC State, North Carolina, Duke and Wake Forest. The Wolfpack's rivalry with North Carolina is generally regarded as the most prominent college football game in the state of North Carolina. The Tar Heels lead the all-time series 68–41–6 through the 2025 season. The game is played annually at the end of every season during Thanksgiving week. Since the formation of the ACC in 1953, North Carolina leads the series 37–36, and NC State holds a 17–9 series advantage since 2000, including winning 14 out of the last 19 games against UNC-Chapel Hill. Previously, the two schools were members of separate divisions in the Atlantic Coast Conference, but were designated as cross-over rivals, and thus played each other every year. As the ACC has expanded, the State-Carolina game has been designated as a protected rivalry, and the two schools will continue to play against each other on a yearly basis. NC State has won the last 5 games in the series, winning the latest contest by a score of 42-19. Current head coach Dave Doeren is 9-4 against Carolina, including a 5-1 record in Chapel Hill.

=== Wake Forest ===
This game is part of the larger Tobacco Road rivalry between North Carolina Power 5 universities NC State, North Carolina, Duke and Wake Forest. NC State leads the all-time series with Wake Forest 70–43–6 through the 2025 season. The rivalry game holds the distinction as the longest continuous rivalry between 2 ACC schools, and currently it is the second longest active streak in the nation. NC State and Wake Forest have played consecutively every year since 1910.

The two schools last played during the 2025 season in Winston-Salem, with NC State winning 34-24.

== Individual achievements and awards ==
=== National award winners ===
- **Bobby Dodd Coach of the Year Award**

Dick Sheridan – (1986)

- **Lou Groza Award**

Marc Primanti – (1996)
Chris Dunn – (2022)

- **Outland Trophy**

Jim Ritcher – (1979)

- **Jack Tatum Trophy**

David Amerson – (2011)

- **Ted Hendricks Award**

Bradley Chubb – (2017)

- **Bronko Nagurski Trophy**

Bradley Chubb – (2017)

- **Rimington Trophy**

Garrett Bradbury – (2018)

- **Dick Butkus Award**

Payton Wilson - (2023)

- **Chuck Bednarik Award**

Payton Wilson - (2023)

- **Patrick Mannelly Award**

Joe Shimko - (2023)

=== List of All-Americans ===
All records per NC State Athletics.

- John Ripple, T (1918)
- Mack Stout (1930)
- Steve Sabol, C (1935)
- Ty Coon, T (1938, 1939)
- Elmer Costa, T (1949, 1950)
- Dick Christy, HB (1957)
- Roman Gabriel, QB (1960, 1961)
- Don Montgomery, DE (1963)
- Dennis Byrd, DT (1966, **1967**)
- Fred Combs, DB (1967)
- Gerald Warren, K (1967, 1968)
- Ron Carpenter, DT (1968)
- Carey Metts, C (1968)
- Bill Yoest, G (**1973**)
- Stan Fritts, FB (1974)
- Don Buckey, SE (1975)
- Johnny Evans, P (1977)
- Ted Brown, RB (**1978**)
- Jim Ritcher, C (**1978**, **1979**†)
- Vaughan Johnson, LB (1983)
- Nasrallah Worthen, WR (1986, 1988)
- Jesse Campbell, SS (1989, 1990)
- Mike Reid, SS (1992)
- Sebastian Savage, CB (1992)
- Steve Videtich, K (1994)
- Marc Primanti, K (**1996**)
- Torry Holt, WR (**1998**)
- Lloyd Harrison, CB (1998, 1999)
- Koren Robinson, WR (2000)
- Levar Fisher, LB (2000)
- Terrence Holt, FS (2002)
- Mario Williams, DE (2005)
- Nate Irving, LB (2010)
- David Amerson, CB (2011)
- Scott Thompson, LS (2014)
- Joe Thuney, T (2015)
- Nyheim Hines, RB/All-Purpose (2017)
- Bradley Chubb, DE (**2017**†)
- Garrett Bradbury, C (**2018**)
- Terrone Prescod, G (2018)
- Alim McNeil, DT (2020)
- Ikem Ekwonu, T (**2021**†)
- Chris Dunn, K (**2022**)
- Payton Wilson, LB (**2023**†)

Years in Bold indicate Consensus 1st team All-American

† Unanimous All-American

=== First-Team Walter Camp All-Americans ===
- Dennis Byrd, DE (1967)
- Bill Yoest, G (1973)
- Jim Ritcher, C (1979)
- David Amerson, CB (2011)
- Bradley Chubb, DE (2017)
- Garrett Bradbury, C (2018)
- Ikem Ekwonu, OT (2021)
- Chris Dunn, K (2022)
- Payton Wilson, LB (2023)

=== Retired numbers ===
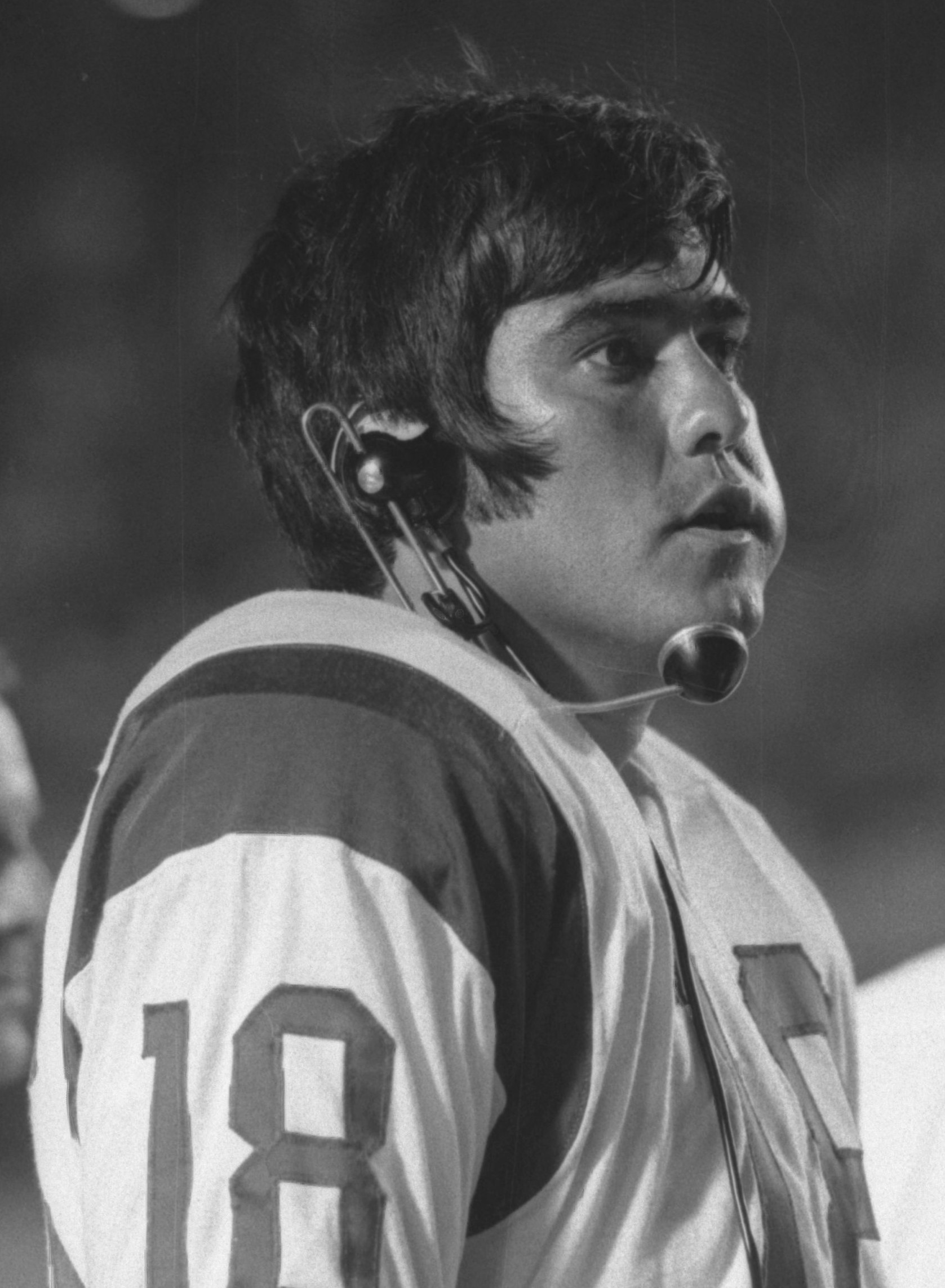
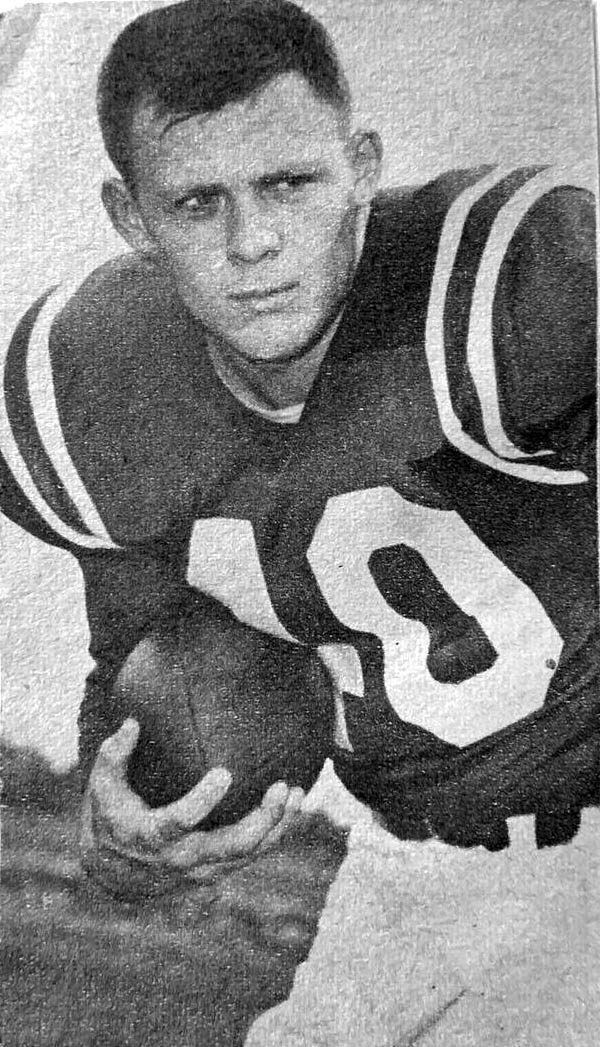
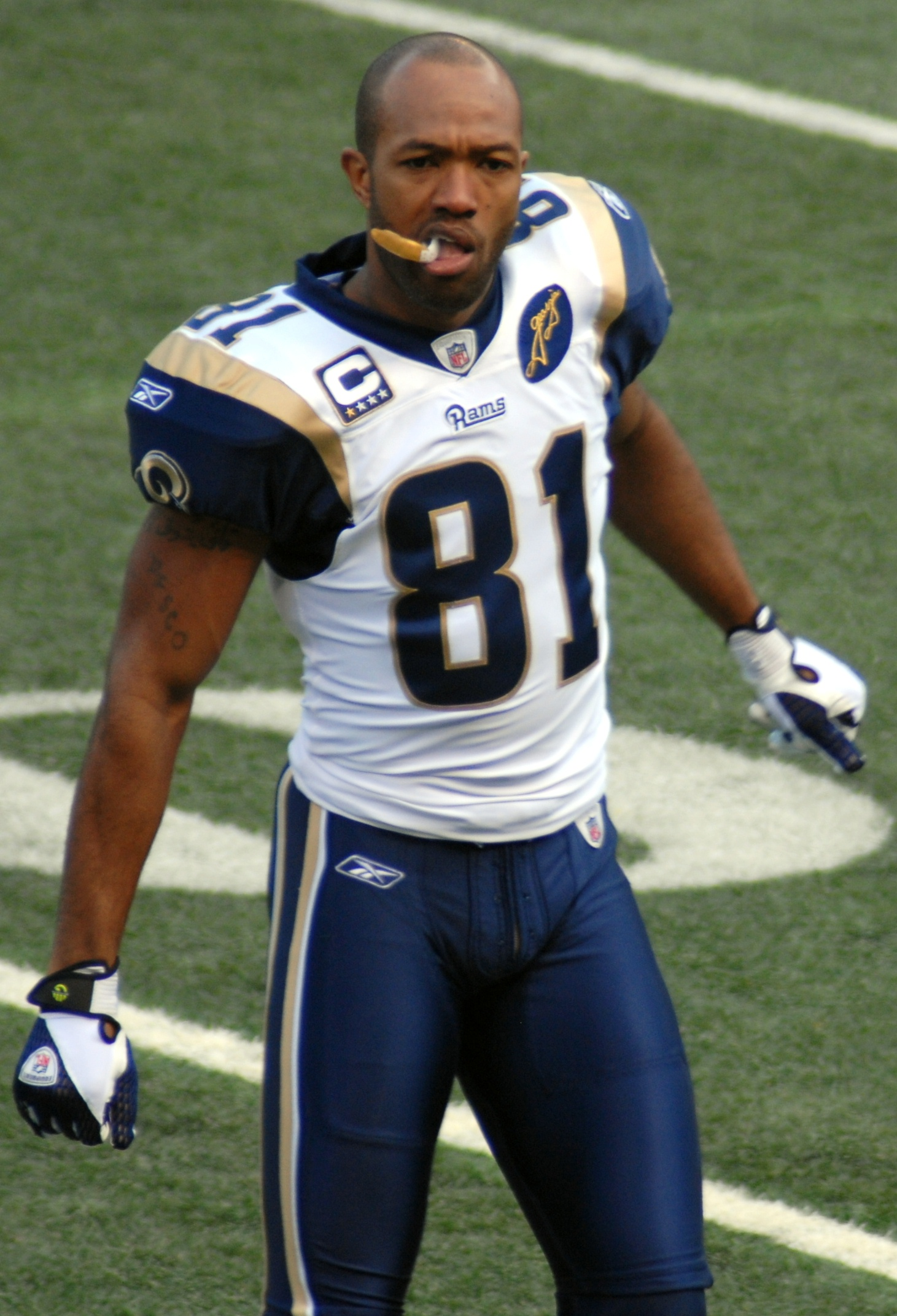
Fltr: Roman Gabriel, Dick Christy, and Torry Holt, who have their 18, 40, and 81 numbers retired

NC State Wolfpack retired numbers
No.	Player	Pos.	Tenure	No. ret.	Ref.
17	Philip Rivers	QB	2000–2003	2003	
18	Roman Gabriel	QB	1958–1961	1962	
23	Ted Brown	RB	1975–1978	1978	
40	Dick Christy	RB	1954–1957	1997	
51	Jim Ritcher	C	1976–1979	1987	
63	Bill Yoest	OT	1970–1973	2003	
77	Dennis Byrd	DE	1964–1967		
81	Torry Holt	WR	1995–1998	1999	

=== Honored jerseys ===
Those jersey numbers remain available. Future players wearing these numbers will have a patch recognizing former players.

NC State Wolfpack honored jerseys
No.	Player	Pos.	Tenure
**9**	Mario Williams	DE	2003–2005
**9**	Bradley Chubb	DE	2014–2017
**16**	Russell Wilson	QB	2007–2010

=== Atlantic Coast Conference awards ===
ACC Player of the Year
1957	Dick Christy
1960	Roman Gabriel
1961	Roman Gabriel
1973	Willie Burden
1986	Erik Kramer
1998	Torry Holt
2003	Philip Rivers
Offensive Player of the Year
1998	Torry Holt
2003	Philip Rivers
Defensive Player of the Year
2000	Levar Fisher
2017	Bradley Chubb
2023	Payton Wilson

ACC Rookie of the Year
1975	Ted Brown
1981	Joe McIntosh
1986	Ray Agnew
1988	Jesse Campbell
1998	Ray Robinson
1999	Koren Robinson
2000	Philip Rivers
2002	T. A. McLendon
2008	Russell Wilson
2023	Kevin "KC" Concepcion

Brian Piccolo Award
1977	Ralph Stringer
1991	Scott Adell
2009	Toney Baker
2010	Nate Irving†
Jacobs Blocking Trophy
1973	Bill Yoest
1978	Jim Ritcher
1979	Jim Ritcher
2021	Ikem Ekwonu

ACC Coach of the Year
1957	Earle Edwards
1963	Earle Edwards†
1965	Earle Edwards
1967	Earle Edwards
1972	Lou Holtz
1986	Dick Sheridan

† co-winner

=== Wolfpack in the NFL draft ===
Number 1 overall picks

- 1962 – Roman Gabriel – QB – Oakland Raiders in the 1962 AFL draft (signed with the Los Angeles Rams of the NFL.)
- 2006 – Mario Williams – DE – Houston Texans

== Hall of Fame inductees ==
=== College Football Hall of Fame ===
Six former NC State players and four former head coaches have been inducted into the College Football Hall of Fame as of 2022.

Name	Position	Inducted
Buck Shaw	Head coach	1972
Jack McDowall	HB	1975
Roman Gabriel	QB	1989
Jim Ritcher	C	1998
Lou Holtz	Head coach	2008
Jim Donnan	Head coach	2009
Dennis Byrd	DT	2010
Ted Brown	RB	2013
Torry Holt	WR	2019
Dick Sheridan	Head coach	2020

=== Pro Football Hall of Fame ===
Name	Position	Inducted
Bill Cowher	Head coach	2020

=== Canadian Football Hall of Fame ===
Name	Position	Team	Career	Inducted	Ref.
Willie Burden	RB	Calgary Stampeders	1974–1981	2001	

== Future opponents including ACC games ==
The ACC schedules from 2024–2030 are available at: ACC Announces Future Conference Football Schedule Model

Year	Non-conference opponents				ACC opponents								
2026	Richmond (9/12)	at Vanderbilt (9/19)	Appalachian State (9/26)		California	Duke	Louisville	Syracuse	Wake Forest	at Florida State	at North Carolina	at Stanford	at Virginia
2027	North Carolina A&T (8/28)	Kansas State (9/25)	Louisiana Tech (10/2)		Clemson	Miami	North Carolina	Pittsburgh	at Duke	at SMU	at Syracuse	at Virginia	at Wake Forest
2028	at East Carolina (9/2)	at Kansas State (9/16)	at Appalachian State (9/30)		Boston College	Duke	SMU	Wake Forest	at California	at Clemson	at Louisville	at North Carolina	
2029	Troy (8/25)	at South Florida (9/8)	Campbell (9/22)	Notre Dame (10/6)	Miami	North Carolina	Pittsburgh	Virginia	at Duke	at Florida State	at SMU	at Wake Forest	
2030	Charlotte (9/7)	TBD	TBD	TBD	Duke	Louisville	Stanford	Wake Forest	at Boston College	at North Carolina	at Pittsburgh	at Virginia Tech	
2031	at Charlotte (9/6)	at Notre Dame (11/22)	TBD	TBD									
2032	TBD	TBD	TBD	TBD									
2033	TBD	TBD	TBD	TBD									
2034	TBD	TBD	TBD	TBD									
2035	Notre Dame (11/10)	TBD	TBD	TBD									
