= Mickey Whitehurst =

American sportsman (1873–1953)

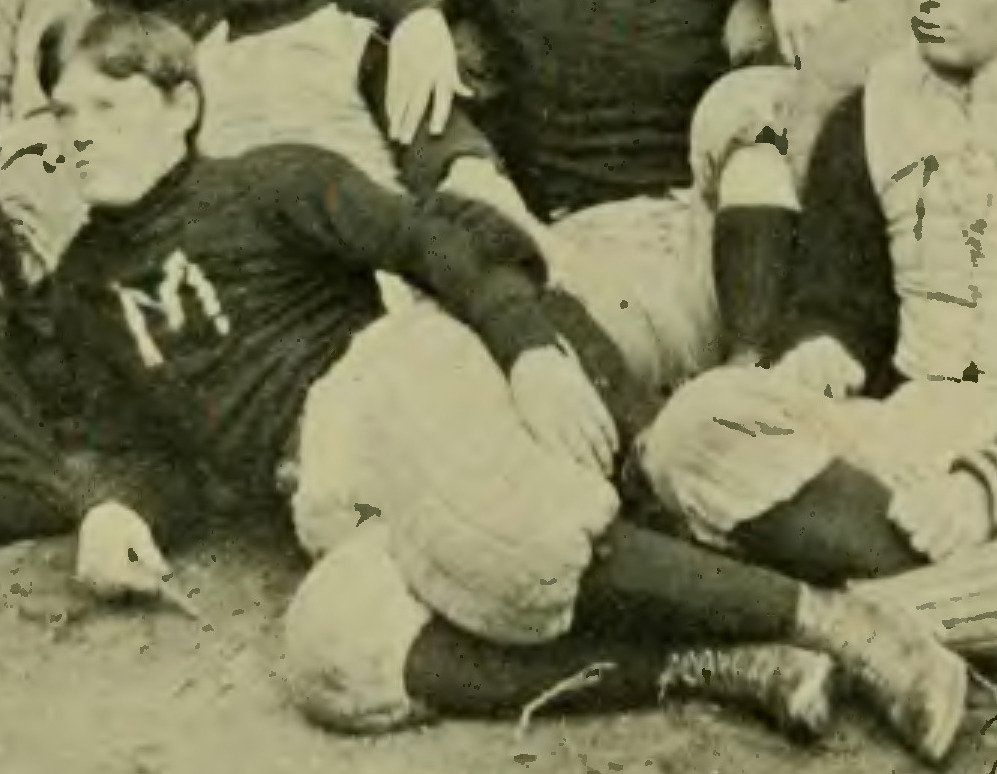
- Whitehurst in 1897

Biographical details
- Born: August 20, 1873; Baltimore, Maryland, U.S.
- Died: December 1953; Tampa, Florida, U.S.
- Education: University of Maryland

Coaching career (HC unless noted)
- 1901–1906: Western Maryland
- 1907–1908: North Carolina A&M
- 1912: Western Maryland

Head coaching record
- Overall: 45–28–3

Accomplishments and honors

Championships
- 1 SAIAA (1907)

Milton Morris "Mickey" Whitehurst (August 20, 1873 – December 1953) was an American sportsman. As a wrestler, he competed in the men's freestyle bantamweight at the 1904 Summer Olympics. Whitehurst played ice hockey for the University of Maryland, and was part of the team that won the Northampton Hockey Champions in 1898. Whitehurst also coached the football team at the North Carolina College of Agriculture and Mechanic Arts in 1907 and 1908.

== Head coaching record ==
| Year | Team | Overall | Conference | Standing | Bowl/playoffs |
|---|---|---|---|---|---|
Western Maryland Green Terror (Independent) (1901–1906)
| 1901 | Western Maryland | 4–6 | | | |
| 1902 | Western Maryland | 5–3–1 | | | |
| 1903 | Western Maryland | 5–3 | | | |
| 1904 | Western Maryland | 5–1–1 | | | |
| 1905 | Western Maryland | 6–5 | | | |
| 1906 | Western Maryland | 3–6 | | | |
North Carolina A&M Aggies (South Atlantic Intercollegiate Athletic Association) (1907–1908)
| 1907 | North Carolina A&M | 6–0–1 | 4–0 | 1st | |
| 1908 | North Carolina A&M | 6–1 | 4–1 | 3rd | |
| North Carolina A&M: | | 12–1–1 | 8–1 | | |
Western Maryland Green Terror (Independent) (1912)
| 1912 | Western Maryland | 5–3 | | | |
| Western Maryland: | | 33–27–2 | | | |
| Total: | | 45–28–3 | | | |
National championship Conference title Conference division title or championship game berth
