= Bart Gatling =

American football coach

Biographical details
- Born: April 12, 1871; Raleigh, North Carolina, U.S.
- Died: August 2, 1950 (aged 79); Raleigh, North Carolina, U.S.

Coaching career (HC unless noted)
- 1893–1895: North Carolina A&M

Head coaching record
- Overall: 4–4–1

Bartholomew Moore Gatling (April 12, 1871 – August 2, 1950) was an American college football coach and lawyer. He served as the head football coach at North Carolina College of Agriculture and Mechanic Arts—now known as North Carolina State University—from 1893 to 1895, compiling a record of 4–4–1.

Gatling was born in Raleigh, North Carolina to John Gatling, a prominent lawyer and former member of the North Carolina Senate, and Sarah Louis Moore Gatling. He earned a Bachelor of Arts from the University of North Carolina in 1892 and a Bachelor of Laws degree from Harvard Law School in 1895. Gatling practiced law in Raleigh and was the chairman of the Wake Democratic Executive Committee. He was Raleigh's postmaster from 1915 to 1922. Gatling continued his law practice until his death, on August 2, 1950, at his birthplace in Raleigh.

== Head coaching record ==
Year	Team	Overall	Conference	Standing	Bowl/playoffs
North Carolina A&M Aggies (Independent) (1893–1895)
1893	North Carolina A&M	2–0			
1894	North Carolina A&M	0–2			
1895	North Carolina A&M	2–2–1			
North Carolina A&M:		4–4–1			
Total:		4–4–1			
