= 2026 Troy Trojans football team =

American college football season

2026 Troy Trojans football
- Conference: Sun Belt Conference
- West Division
- Record: 4–7 (2–5 Sun Belt)
- Head coach: Gerad Parker (3rd season)
- Offensive coordinator: Adam Austin (1st season)
- Defensive coordinator: Dontae Wright (3rd season)
- Co-defensive coordinator: Nathan Burton (3rd season)
- Home stadium: Veterans Memorial Stadium

2026 Sun Belt Conference football standings
	Conf.			Overall
Team	W		L	W		L
East Division
Georgia Southern	6	–	1	7	–	4
James Madison	5	–	2	8	–	3
Appalachian State	4	–	3	7	–	4
Coastal Carolina	3	–	4	4	–	7
Marshall	3	–	4	6	–	5
Georgia State	2	–	5	5	–	6
Old Dominion	2	–	5	3	–	8
West Division
Louisiana Tech xy	7	–	0	9	–	2
Louisiana	5	–	2	8	–	3
South Alabama	4	–	3	6	–	5
Arkansas State	2	–	5	4	–	7
Troy	2	–	5	4	–	7
Southern Miss	2	–	5	3	–	8
Louisiana–Monroe	2	–	5	2	–	9
Championship: TBD vs. Louisiana Tech
$ – Conference champion; x – Division champion/co-champions; y – Championship game participant; As of November 22, 2026; Rankings from AP poll

The 2026 Troy Trojans football team will represent Troy University as a member of the West Division of the Sun Belt Conference during the 2026 NCAA Division I FBS football season. They are led by third-year head coach Gerad Parker and will play their home games at Veterans Memorial Stadium in Troy, Alabama.

== Preseason ==
=== Media poll ===
In the Sun Belt preseason coaches' poll, the Trojans were picked to finish first place in the West division.

Defensive lineman Donnie Smith was named the Preseason Defensive Player of the Year. Punter Evan Crenshaw was named the Preseason Special Teams Player of the Year. Defensive lineman Donnie Smith and punter Evan Crenshaw were awarded to be in the preseason All-Sun Belt first team defense and special teams, respectively. Quarterback Goose Crowder, offensive lineman Jordon Jones, defensive back Justin Powe and associated press player Jordan Lovett were awarded to be in the preseason All-Sun Belt second team offense, defense and special teams, respectively.

== Schedule ==
The football schedule was announced on March 13, 2026.

Date	Time	Opponent	Site	TV	Result	Attendance
September 5	6:00 p.m.	Sam Houston*	Veterans Memorial Stadium; Troy, AL	ESPN+	W 24–21	24,356
September 12	3:00 p.m.	Alabama State*	Veterans Memorial Stadium; Troy, AL	ESPN+	W 34–17	26,634
September 19	6:00 p.m.	at No. 20 Missouri*	Faurot Field; Columbia, MO	SECN+	L 17–27	63,609
September 26	6:30 p.m.	at Utah State*	Maverik Stadium; Logan, UT	CBSSN	L 10–21	22,037
October 6	7:00 p.m.	Southern Miss	Veterans Memorial Stadium; Troy, AL	ESPN2	W 55–34	21,933
October 17	4:00 p.m.	at Louisiana	Cajun Field; Lafayette, LA	ESPN+	L 6–33	20,623
October 24	3:00 p.m.	Louisiana–Monroe	Veterans Memorial Stadium; Troy, AL	ESPN+	L 14–21	23,741
October 29	6:30 p.m.	at James Madison	Bridgeforth Stadium; Harrisonburg, VA	ESPN2	W 24–21 ^{OT}	25,005
November 7	3:00 p.m.	Louisiana Tech^{†}	Veterans Memorial Stadium; Troy, AL	ESPN+	L 17–41	22,349
November 14	6:00 p.m.	at South Alabama	Hancock Whitney Stadium; Mobile, AL (Battle for the Belt)	ESPN+	L 13–27	22,269
November 21	3:00 p.m.	Georgia Southern	Veterans Memorial Stadium; Troy, AL	ESPN+	L 7–45	18,977
November 28	2:00 p.m.	at Arkansas State	Centennial Bank Stadium; Jonesboro, AR	ESPN+		
*Non-conference game; ^{†}Homecoming; Rankings from AP Poll and CFP Rankings released prior to game; All times are in Central time

== Personnel ==
=== Transfers ===
Outgoing
Player	Position	New school
Mojo Dortch	WR	Withdrawn
DJ Jackson Jr.	EDGE	Oklahoma State
DJ Epps	WR	West Virginia
Jaquez White	CB	Virginia Tech
Amare Garrett	CB	Unknown
Rondell Carter	S	Unknown
Jackson Thomas	WR	Unknown
Keion Dunlap	S	Unknown
Tae Meadows	RB	Auburn
Paul Bowling	IOL	Florida State
Zerian Hudson	IOL	Unknown
Dylan Mann	DL	Delaware
ShuMond Johnson	EDGE	Southern Illinois
Kam Weaver	LB	Unknown
Billy Gilmore	IOL	West Alabama
Trashun Griffin	EDGE	Middle Tennessee
Roman Mothershed	WR	LSU
Chad Barham	TE	Central Arkansas
Malik Ellis	IOL	Nicholls
Malaki Pegues	DL	Tennessee Tech
Kyler Gibson	OT	Austin Peay
Trent Henry	CB	Unknown
Paddy McAteer	K	Indiana
Ui Ale	QB	Unknown
Matt Henry	IOL	Unknown
Tray Taylor	WR	Unknown
KC Bradford	S	Unknown
Vysen Lang	OL	Prairie View A&M
Casey Fua'au	OL	Delaware State
Trey Cooley	RB	Washington

Incoming
Player	Position	Previous school
Keno Jones	LB	Barton
Luke Petit	IOL	Furman
Jaheim Merriweather	RB	Purdue
Marcus Goree Jr.	CB	Tennessee
Ty Clemons	DL	Boston College
TJ Lott	WR	Old Dominion
Ethan Head	K	West Virginia
Jordon Jones	OT	Ohio
Jonathan Pennix	CB	Southern Miss
Kavion Henderson	EDGE	Arkansas
Knai Cook	S	Charleston Southern
Bryce Steele	LB	Boston College
Jalen Ballard	K	Ole Miss
Darion Rivers	OT	NC State
Jaden Pete	QB	Tarleton State

=== Roster ===
2026 Troy Trojans football team roster
Players
Coaches
Offense

Pos.	#	Name	Class
RB	0	Gavin Griffin	Jr
RB	1	Jordan Lovett	Jr
WR	2	Jywon Boyd	So
RB	3	Jaheim Merriweather	Jr
WR	4	Noreel White	So
WR	5	Mojo Dortch	Jr
QB	6	Jack James	Fr
WR	7	Kristian Tate	Jr
WR	8	TK Keyes	So
QB	9	Goose Crowder	Sr
QB	10	Tucker Kilcrease	Sr
QB	11	Rodge Waldrop	So
WR	12	Hayden Jackson	Jr
WR	13	Ky McNulty	So
TE	14	Marquis Harris	Jr
WR	15	TJ Lott	Jr
QB	17	Jaden Pete	Sr
WR	18	Howard Kinchen	Jr
TE	19	Nick Hampton	Fr
RB	21	AC Walters	Fr
RB	22	Bryce Burgess	Jr
RB	25	Dennis Palmer	So
RB	26	DeWhitt Betterson Jr.	Sr
OL	50	Luke Petit	Sr
OL	54	Caleb Ash	So
OL	55	Jordon Jones	Sr
OL	56	Sharvon Pierre	Fr
OL	57	Noah Mercer	Jr
OL	58	Elijah Prather	Jr
OL	63	Gavin Bowlin	Fr
OL	65	Tyler Cappi	Sr
OL	66	Jatorian Blackmon	Fr
OL	67	Trinton Pritchett	Fr
OL	71	Antwone Breland	Jr
OL	72	Patrick Screws Jr.	Jr
OL	73	Tyler Bell	Jr
OL	74	Tra'jon Townsend	Jr
OL	75	Parks Glaze	Fr
OL	77	Darion Rivers	Jr
OL	80	JT Tang	So
WR	81	Jah'Marren Jackson	Fr
WR	82	Dylan Denson	Fr
TE	85	Fabian Rogosch	Sr
TE	88	Jackson Worley	Jr

Defense

Pos.	#	Name	Class
DT	0	Kam Curry	Sr
CB	1	Jabari Strait	Sr
LB	2	Bryce Steele	Sr
SPR	3	Doug Nelson	Jr
LB	4	TJ Thompson	Sr
BAN	5	Lonnie Smith	Jr
S	6	Justin Powe	Sr
CB	7	Jordan Turner	Jr
S	8	Marcus Goree Jr.	So
S	9	Jamarion Keyes	Jr
S	10	Knai Cook	Jr
DT	11	Ty Clemons	Sr
CB	12	Shemar Welch	So
SPR	13	Daivon Nelson	Sr
CB	14	Jonathan Pennix	Jr
LB	15	Keno Jones	Sr
S	16	Antonious Steele	Fr
CB	17	Marlin Odom	So
SPR	18	Jordan Perry	Sr
S	19	Jon Bocchino	Fr
LB	20	Keyshawn Campbell	Jr
CB	21	Tai Terrell	Jr
BAN	22	Donnie Smith	Sr
LB	23	JT Alvis	Fr
DE	25	Kavion Henderson	So
S	27	OJ Vaughan Jr.	So
CB	28	Jaxon Penn	Fr
S	29	Joe Lott	So
CB	37	Jalen Peterson	Fr
DT	40	RJ Shamberger	Fr
DE	41	Makel Green	Fr
LB	44	Luke Hodge	Sr
BAN	45	Jordan Ferrell	So
LB	46	Gavyn Baker	So
DT	69	Jermaine Paramore	So
DE	88	Will Norman	Jr
DT	93	RaKeem Davis	Jr
DT	95	Miquon Merriweather	Jr

Special teams

Pos.	#	Name	Class
K	16	Jalen Ballard	Sr
K	20	Jaden Tynes	Fr
LS	24	Kinnick Manley	Sr
P	28	Evan Crenshaw	Sr
K	33	Ethan Head	Jr
K	38	Hayden Wolfe	Jr
P	49	Austin Lewis	Fr
LS	87	Colton Walls	Jr

Head coach

- Gerad Parker (Kentucky)

Coordinators/assistant coaches

- Adam Austin (Arizona)
  Offensive coordinator/QB
- Dontae Wright (Miami (OH))
  Defensive coordinator/S
- Gary Banks (Troy)
  Wide receivers
- Chris Boone (Southern Miss)
  Outside linebackers
- Re'quan Boyette (Duke)
  Running backs
- Nathan Burton (Georgia Tech)
  Co-defensive coordinator/ILB
- Caleb Carbine (Troy)
  Offensive linemen
- Brandon Cooper (UT Martin)
  Cornerbacks
- Justin Manning (North Carolina Central)
  Defensive linemen
- Kevin Reihner (Stanford)
  Tight ends/tackles
- Ben Sowders (Western Kentucky)
  Director of strength and performance

Legend

- (C) Team captain
- (S) Suspended
- (I) Ineligible
- Injured
- Redshirt

Roster
Last update: 11 March 2026

== Game summaries ==
=== Sam Houston ===
Sam Houston Bearkats (0–0) at Troy Trojans (0–0) – Game summary

Quarter	1	2	3	4	Total
Bearkats	7	7	0	7	21
Trojans	7	7	3	7	24

at Veterans Memorial Stadium • Troy, Alabama

- Date: September 5
- Game time: 6:00 p.m. CDT
- Game weather: Sunny • Temperature: 83 °F (28 °C) • Wind: SW at 4 mph
- Game attendance: 24,356
- Referee: Ron Hudson
- TV announcers (ESPN+): Will Kollmeyer, Ben Stanfield and Rosie Langello

Game information

First quarter

- SHSU – Grady O'Neill 14-yard pass from Landyn Locke (Sam Carpenter kick), 7:47. Bearkats 7–0. Drive: 6 plays, 83 yards, 2:32.
- TROY – Fabian Rogosch 19-yard pass from Goose Crowder (Ethan Head kick), 4:06. Tied 7–7. Drive: 9 plays, 75 yards, 3:41.

Second quarter

- TROY – TK Keyes 28-yard pass from Goose Crowder (Ethan Head kick), 14:54. Trojans 14–7. Drive: 6 plays, 72 yards, 2:13.
- SHSU – Darrick Bledsoe III 14-yard pass from Landyn Locke (Sam Carpenter kick), 11:59. Tied 14–14. Drive: 6 plays, 75 yards, 2:55.

Third quarter

- TROY – Ethan Head 32-yard field goal, 14:11. Trojans 17–14. Drive: 4 plays, 0 yards, 0:41.

Fourth quarter

- TROY – TJ Lott 18-yard pass from Goose Crowder (Ethan Head kick), 10:42. Trojans 24–14. Drive: 9 plays, 87 yards, 4:35.
- SHSU – Chris Reed 31-yard pass from Landyn Locke (Sam Carpenter kick), 1:03. Trojans 24–21. Drive: 9 plays, 85 yards, 3:17.

Statistics	SHSU	TROY
First downs	22	18
Plays–yards	84–373	66–342
Rushes–yards	24–38	42–177
Passing yards	335	165
Passing: comp–att–int	30–46–1	12–24–0
Turnovers	1	0
Time of possession	30:51	29:09

Team	Category	Player	Statistics
Sam Houston	Passing	Landyn Locke	30/46, 335 yards, 3 TD, INT
Sam Houston	Rushing	Alton McCaskill	13 carries, 51 yards
Sam Houston	Receiving	Grady O'Neill	7 receptions, 86 yards, TD
Troy	Passing	Goose Crowder	12/24, 165 yards, 3 TD
Troy	Rushing	Gavin Griffin	16 carries, 81 yards
Troy	Receiving	TK Keyes	2 receptions, 48 yards, TD

=== Alabama State (FCS) ===
Alabama State Hornets (FCS) (2–0) at Troy Trojans (1–0) – Game summary

Quarter	1	2	3	4	Total
Hornets (FCS)	7	0	10	0	17
Trojans	14	17	3	0	34

at Veterans Memorial Stadium • Troy, Alabama

- Date: September 12
- Game time: 3:00 p.m. CDT
- Game weather: Cloudy • Temperature: 86 °F (30 °C) • Wind: SW at 7 mph
- Game attendance: 26,634
- Referee: Scott Broadway
- TV announcers (ESPN+): Will Kollmeyer, Ben Stanfield, Rosie Langello and Gavan Baxley

Game information

First quarter

- TROY – TK Keyes 73-yard pass from Goose Crowder (Ethan Head kick), 13:25. Trojans 7–0. Drive: 3 plays, 90 yards, 1:31.
- ALST – Jamarie Hostzclaw 50-yard run (Andrew Abu-Akel kick), 10:51. Tied 7–7. Drive: 6 plays, 81 yards, 2:27.
- TROY – Jaheim Merriweather 69-yard run (Ethan Head kick), 5:56. Trojans 14–7. Drive: 1 play, 69 yards, 0:14.

Second quarter

- TROY – Ethan Head 24-yard field goal, 11:52. Trojans 17–7. Drive: 12 plays, 49 yards, 6:32.
- TROY – Jaheim Merriweather 6-yard run (Ethan Head kick), 3:41. Trojans 24–7. Drive: 10 plays, 61 yards, 4:55.
- TROY – Jaheim Merriweather 1-yard run (Ethan Head kick), 0:15. Trojans 31–7. Drive: 4 plays, 42 yards, 0:52.

Third quarter

- ALST – John Austin 19-yard pass from Andrew Body (Andrew Abu-Akel kick), 11:33. Trojans 31–14. Drive: 2 plays, 34 yards, 0:36.
- ALST – Andrew Abu-Akel 37-yard field goal, 8:41. Trojans 31–17. Drive: 5 plays, 10 yards, 1:56.
- TROY – Ethan Head 47-yard field goal, 5:00. Trojans 34–17. Drive: 10 plays, 35 yards, 3:33.

Fourth quarter

- No scoring plays.

Statistics	ALST	TROY
First downs	15	19
Plays–yards	58–221	68–417
Rushes–yards	34–116	39–226
Passing yards	105	201
Passing: comp–att–int	13–24–0	14–29–0
Turnovers	1	0
Time of possession	27:05	32:55

Team	Category	Player	Statistics
Alabama State	Passing	Andrew Body	13/23, 105 yards, TD
Alabama State	Rushing	Jamarie Hostzclaw	12 carries, 80 yards, TD
Alabama State	Receiving	Franck Pierre	1 reception, 27 yards
Troy	Passing	Goose Crowder	14/27, 201 yards, TD
Troy	Rushing	Jaheim Merriweather	13 carries, 127 yards, 3 TD
Troy	Receiving	TK Keyes	5 receptions, 119 yards, TD

=== at No. 20 Missouri ===
Troy Trojans (2–0) at No. 20 Missouri Tigers (2–0) – Game summary

Quarter	1	2	3	4	Total
Trojans	10	7	0	0	17
No. 20 Tigers	0	24	0	3	27

at Faurot Field • Columbia, Missouri

- Date: September 19
- Game time: 6:00 p.m. CDT
- Game weather: Sunny • Temperature: 91 °F (33 °C) • Wind: SW 5 mph
- Game attendance: 63,609
- Referee: Tim Barker
- TV announcers (SECN+): Kevin Fitzgerald (play-by-play) and Charles Arbuckle (analyst)

Game information

First quarter

- TROY – TK Keyes 76-yard pass from Goose Crowder (Ethan Head kick), 14:15. Trojans 7–0. Drive: 2 plays, 75 yards, 0:45.
- TROY – Ethan Head 27-yard field goal, 0:50. Trojans 10–0. Drive: 19 plays, 81 yards, 10:32.

Second quarter

- MIZ – Blake Craig 35-yard field goal, 11:18. Trojans 10–3. Drive: 5 plays, 18 yards, 1:18.
- MIZ – DaMarion Fowlkes 68-yard punt return (Blake Craig kick), 9:39. Tied 10–10. Drive: 3 plays, -5 yards, 1:39.
- MIZ – Donovan Olugbode 12-yard pass from Austin Simmons (Blake Craig kick), 2:03. Tigers 17–10. Drive: 3 plays, 18 yards, 1:03.
- MIZ – Jamal Roberts 13-yard run (Blake Craig kick), 1:44. Tigers 24–10. Drive: 1 play, 13 yards, 0:06.
- TROY – Howard Kinchen 55-yard pass from Goose Crowder (Ethan Head kick), 0:06. Tigers 24–17. Drive: 6 plays, 75 yards, 1:38.

Fourth quarter

- MIZ – Blake Craig 36-yard field goal, 7:18. Tigers 27–17. Drive: 7 plays, 51 yards, 3:21.

Statistics	TROY	MIZ
First downs	18	13
Plays–yards	72-323	47-230
Rushes–yards	40-93	28-139
Passing yards	230	91
Passing: comp–att–int	18-32-1	10-19-0
Time of possession	37:23	22:37

Team	Category	Player	Statistics
Troy	Passing	Goose Crowder	18/32, 230 yards, 2 TDs, INT
Troy	Rushing	Gavin Griffin	17 carries, 56 yards
Troy	Receiving	TK Keyes	2 receptions, 83 yards, TD
Missouri	Passing	Austin Simmons	10/19, 91 yards, TD
Missouri	Rushing	Jamal Roberts	22 carries, 128 yards, TD
Missouri	Receiving	Donovan Olugbode	3 receptions, 31 yards, TD

=== at Utah State ===
Troy Trojans (2–1) at Utah State Aggies (0–3) – Game summary

Quarter	1	2	3	4	Total
Trojans	7	3	0	0	10
Aggies	7	0	14	0	21

at Maverik Stadium • Logan, Utah

- Date: September 26
- Game time: 6:30 p.m. CDT
- Game weather: Sunny
- Game attendance: 22,037
- Referee: Chris Snead
- TV announcers (CBSSN): Jordan Kent, Doug Pederson and Brandon Baylor

Game information

First quarter

- USU - Javon Robinson 57-yard pass from Grady Brosterhous (Kian Afrookhteh kick), 13:46. Aggies 7-0. Drive: 1 play, 57 yards, 0:11.
- TROY - Howard Kinchen 13-yard pass from Goose Crowder (Ethan Head kick), 7:56. Tied 7-7. Drive: 11 plays, 75 yards, 5:48.

Second quarter

- TROY - Ethan Head 45-yard field goal, 10:24. Trojans 10-7. Drive: 7 plays, 53 yards, 3:22.

Third quarter

- USU - Eli Wood 5-yard pass from Grady Brosterhous (Kian Afrookhteh kick), 11:02. Aggies 14-10. Drive: 9 plays, 75 yards, 3:58.
- USU - Javen Jacobs 6-yard run (Kian Afrookhteh kick), 4:51. Aggies 21-10. Drive: 6 plays, 80 yards, 3:09.

Fourth quarter

No scoring plays

Statistics	TROY	USU
First downs	26	19
Plays–yards	80–395	59–413
Rushes–yards	31–169	31–171
Passing yards	226	242
Passing: comp–att–int	25–49–3	18–28–1
Time of possession	34:16	25:42

Team	Category	Player	Statistics
Troy	Passing	Goose Crowder	25/49, 226 yards, TD, 3 INT
Troy	Rushing	Gavin Griffin	11 carries, 66 yards
Troy	Receiving	Noreel White	6 receptions, 75 yards
Utah State	Passing	Grady Brosterhous	18/28, 242 yards, 2 TD, INT
Utah State	Rushing	Grady Brosterhous	15 carries, 89 yards
Utah State	Receiving	Eli Wood	7 receptions, 96 yards, TD

=== Southern Miss ===
Southern Miss Golden Eagles (1–3) at Troy Trojans (2–2) – Game summary

Quarter	1	2	3	4	Total
Golden Eagles	0	7	20	7	34
Trojans	17	14	10	14	55

at Veterans Memorial Stadium • Troy, Alabama

- Date: October 6
- Game time: 7:00 p.m. CDT
- Game weather: Clear • Temperature: 72 °F (22 °C) • Wind: NE at 7 miles per hour (11 km/h)
- Game attendance: 21,933
- Referee: Brandon Kirkland
- TV announcers (ESPN2): Clay Matvick (play-by-play) and Rocky Boiman (analyst)

Game information

First quarter

- (10:11) TROY – Jordan Lovett 15-yard run, Ethan Head kick (Drive: 10 plays, 75 yards, 4:49; Troy 7–0)
- (4:37) TROY – Ethan Head 34-yard field goal (Drive: 10 plays, 49 yards, 4:13; Troy 10–0)
- (1:53) TROY – Goose Crowder 9-yard run, Ethan Head kick (Drive: 3 plays, 59 yards, 1:17; Troy 17–0)

Second quarter

- (12:09) USM – Mario Sanders 2-yard pass from Landry Lyddy, Creighton Wilbanks kick (Drive: 12 plays, 75 yards, 4:44; Troy 17–7)
- (6:20) TROY – Goose Crowder 1-yard run, Ethan Head kick (Drive: 12 plays, 78 yards, 5:42; Troy 24–7)
- (0:21) TROY – Nick Hampton 5-yard pass from Goose Crowder, Ethan Head kick (Drive: 10 plays, 75 yards, 4:26; Troy 31–7)

Third quarter

- (14:43) USM – AJ Little 75-yard pass from Mario Sanders (Drive: 2 plays, 75 yards, 0:17; Troy 31–13)
- (12:13) TROY – Jordan Lovett 46-yard pass from Goose Crowder, Ethan Head kick (Drive: 5 plays, 82 yards, 2:23; Troy 38–13)
- (5:25) USM – Mario Sanders 27-yard pass from Landry Lyddy, Creighton Wilbanks kick (Drive: 6 plays, 69 yards, 2:20; Troy 38–20)
- (2:12) TROY – Ethan Head 22-yard field goal (Drive: 6 plays, 76 yards, 3:07; Troy 41–20)
- (1:03) USM – Robert Briggs 44-yard run, Creighton Wilbanks kick (Drive: 5 plays, 75 yards, 1:09; Troy 41–27)

Fourth quarter

- (6:50) TROY – Jaheim Merriweather 1-yard run, Ethan Head kick (Drive: 8 plays, 74 yards, 4:29; Troy 48–27)
- (4:38) USM – Jamarice Wilder 1-yard run, Creighton Wilbanks kick (Drive: 6 plays, 75 yards, 2:12; Troy 48–34)
- (1:51) TROY – Gavin Griffin 12-yard run, Ethan Head kick (Drive: 7 plays, 36 yards, 2:47; Troy 55–34)

Statistics	USM	TROY
First downs	30	33
Plays–yards	66–512	80–662
Rushes–yards	27–121	59–437
Passing yards	391	225
Passing: comp–att–int	25–39–2	18–21–0
Time of possession	20:38	39:22

Team	Category	Player	Statistics
Southern Miss	Passing	Landry Lyddy	24/37, 316 yards, 2 TD, INT
Southern Miss	Rushing	Robert Briggs	2 carries, 44 yards, TD
Southern Miss	Receiving	Kaden Saunders	7 receptions, 138 yards
Troy	Passing	Goose Crowder	18/21, 225 yards, 2 TD
Troy	Rushing	Goose Crowder	17 carries, 145 yards, 2 TD
Troy	Receiving	Jordan Lovett	2 receptions, 53 yards, TD

=== at Louisiana ===
Troy Trojans (3–2) at Louisiana Ragin' Cajuns (4–2) – Game summary

Quarter	1	2	3	4	Total
Trojans	0	0	0	0	0
Ragin' Cajuns	0	0	0	0	0

at Cajun Field • Lafayette, Louisiana

- Date: October 17
- Game time: 4:00 p.m. CDT
- Game attendance: 20,623
- TV: ESPN+

Game information

First quarter
Second quarter
Third quarter
Fourth quarter

Statistics	TROY	LA
First downs		
Plays–yards		
Rushes–yards		
Passing yards		
Passing: comp–att–int		
Time of possession		

Team	Category	Player	Statistics
Troy	Passing		
Troy	Rushing		
Troy	Receiving		
Louisiana	Passing		
Louisiana	Rushing		
Louisiana	Receiving		

=== Louisiana–Monroe ===
Louisiana–Monroe Warhawks (0–6) at Troy Trojans (3–3) – Game summary

Quarter	1	2	3	4	Total
Warhawks	0	0	0	0	0
Trojans	0	0	0	0	0

at Veterans Memorial Stadium • Troy, Alabama

- Date: October 24
- Game time: 3:00 p.m. CDT
- Game attendance: 23,741
- TV: ESPN+

Game information

First quarter
Second quarter
Third quarter
Fourth quarter

Statistics	ULM	TROY
First downs		
Plays–yards		
Rushes–yards		
Passing yards		
Passing: comp–att–int		
Time of possession		

Team	Category	Player	Statistics
Louisiana–Monroe	Passing		
Louisiana–Monroe	Rushing		
Louisiana–Monroe	Receiving		
Troy	Passing		
Troy	Rushing		
Troy	Receiving		

=== at James Madison ===
Troy Trojans (3–4) at James Madison Dukes (7–1) – Game summary

Quarter	1	2	3	4	Total
Trojans	0	0	0	0	0
Dukes	0	0	0	0	0

at Bridgeforth Stadium • Harrisonburg, Virginia

- Date: October 29
- Game time: 6:30 p.m. CDT
- Game attendance: 25,005
- TV: ESPN+

Game information

First quarter
Second quarter
Third quarter
Fourth quarter

Statistics	TROY	JMU
First downs		
Plays–yards		
Rushes–yards		
Passing yards		
Passing: comp–att–int		
Time of possession		

Team	Category	Player	Statistics
Troy	Passing		
Troy	Rushing		
Troy	Receiving		
James Madison	Passing		
James Madison	Rushing		
James Madison	Receiving		

=== Louisiana Tech ===
Louisiana Tech Bulldogs (6–2) at Troy Trojans (4–4) – Game summary

Quarter	1	2	3	4	Total
Bulldogs	0	0	0	0	0
Trojans	0	0	0	0	0

at Veterans Memorial Stadium • Troy, Alabama

- Date: November 7
- Game time: 3:00 p.m. CDT
- Game attendance: 22,349
- TV: ESPN+

Game information

First quarter
Second quarter
Third quarter
Fourth quarter

Statistics	LT	TROY
First downs		
Plays–yards		
Rushes–yards		
Passing yards		
Passing: comp–att–int		
Time of possession		

Team	Category	Player	Statistics
Louisiana Tech	Passing		
Louisiana Tech	Rushing		
Louisiana Tech	Receiving		
Troy	Passing		
Troy	Rushing		
Troy	Receiving		

=== at South Alabama (Battle for the Belt) ===
Troy Trojans (4–5) at South Alabama Jaguars (4–5) – Game summary

Quarter	1	2	3	4	Total
Trojans	0	7	0	7	14
Jaguars	14	3	10	0	27

at Hancock Whitney Stadium • Mobile, Alabama

- Date: November 14
- Game time: 6:00 p.m. CDT
- Game weather: Sunny
- Game attendance: 22,269
- Referee: Jay Hagood
- TV announcers (ESPN+): Pat Greenwood (play-by-play) and Brian Genard (analyst)

Game information

First quarter

- (13:34) USA – Trae'von Dunbar 46-yard run, Dylan Freebury kick (Drive: 5 plays, 68 yards, 1:19; South Alabama 7–0)
- (0:37) USA – Trae'von Dunbar 44-yard run, Dylan Freebury kick (Drive: 6 plays, 61 yards, 2:20; South Alabama 14–0)

Second quarter

- (11:21) TROY – Goose Crowder 45-yard run, Hayden Wolfe kick (Drive: 4 plays, 54 yards, 1:48; South Alabama 14–7)
- (4:02) USA – Dylan Freebury 29-yard field goal (Drive: 17 plays, 62 yards, 7:12; South Alabama 17–7)

Third quarter

- (10:52) USA – Dylan Freebury 24-yard field goal (Drive: 6 plays, 71 yards, 2:40; South Alabama 20–7)
- (5:11) USA – Bishop Davenport 28-yard run, Dylan Freebury kick (Drive: 4 plays, 54 yards, 1:52; South Alabama 27–7)

Fourth quarter

- (14:11) TROY – Nick Hampton 4-yard pass from Goose Crowder, Hayden Wolfe kick (Drive: 13 plays, 81 yards, 5:56; South Alabama 27–14)

Statistics	TROY	USA
First downs	20	17
Plays–yards	74–354	60–368
Rushes–yards	33–123	39–246
Passing yards	231	122
Passing: comp–att–int	24–41–0	9–21–0
Time of possession	32:32	27:28

Team	Category	Player	Statistics
Troy	Passing	Goose Crowder	24/41, 231 yards, TD
Troy	Rushing	Goose Crowder	11 carries, 58 yards, TD
Troy	Receiving	Noreel White	4 receptions, 55 yards
South Alabama	Passing	Bishop Davenport	9/21, 122 yards
South Alabama	Rushing	Trae'von Dunbar	14 carries, 153 yards, 2 TD
South Alabama	Receiving	Trae Stevenson	1 reception, 46 yards

=== Georgia Southern ===
Georgia Southern Eagles (6–4) at Troy Trojans (4–6) – Game summary

Quarter	1	2	3	4	Total
Eagles	0	0	0	0	0
Trojans	0	0	0	0	0

at Veterans Memorial Stadium • Troy, Alabama

- Date: November 21
- Game time: 3:00 p.m. CDT
- TV: ESPN+

Game information

First quarter
Second quarter
Third quarter
Fourth quarter

Statistics	GASO	TROY
First downs		
Plays–yards		
Rushes–yards		
Passing yards		
Passing: comp–att–int		
Time of possession		

Team	Category	Player	Statistics
Georgia Southern	Passing		
Georgia Southern	Rushing		
Georgia Southern	Receiving		
Troy	Passing		
Troy	Rushing		
Troy	Receiving		

=== at Arkansas State ===
Troy Trojans (0–0) at Arkansas State Red Wolves (0–0) – Game summary

Quarter	1	2	3	4	Total
Trojans	0	0	0	0	0
Red Wolves	0	0	0	0	0

at Centennial Bank Stadium • Jonesboro, Arkansas

- Date: November 28
- Game time: 2:00 p.m. CDT
- TV: ESPN+

Game information

First quarter
Second quarter
Third quarter
Fourth quarter

Statistics	TROY	ARST
First downs		
Plays–yards		
Rushes–yards		
Passing yards		
Passing: comp–att–int		
Time of possession		

Team	Category	Player	Statistics
Troy	Passing		
Troy	Rushing		
Troy	Receiving		
Arkansas State	Passing		
Arkansas State	Rushing		
Arkansas State	Receiving		
