= 2026 Arkansas State Red Wolves football team =

American college football season

2026 Arkansas State Red Wolves football
- Conference: Sun Belt Conference
- West Division
- Record: 4–7 (2–5 Sun Belt)
- Head coach: Butch Jones (6th season; first 10 games); Jalen Ortiz (interim; remainder of season)
- Offensive coordinator: Garrett Altman (1st season)
- Defensive coordinator: Griff McCarley (2nd season)
- Home stadium: Centennial Bank Stadium

2026 Sun Belt Conference football standings
	Conf.			Overall
Team	W		L	W		L
East Division
Georgia Southern	6	–	1	7	–	4
James Madison	5	–	2	8	–	3
Appalachian State	4	–	3	7	–	4
Coastal Carolina	3	–	4	4	–	7
Marshall	3	–	4	6	–	5
Georgia State	2	–	5	5	–	6
Old Dominion	2	–	5	3	–	8
West Division
Louisiana Tech xy	7	–	0	9	–	2
Louisiana	5	–	2	8	–	3
South Alabama	4	–	3	6	–	5
Arkansas State	2	–	5	4	–	7
Troy	2	–	5	4	–	7
Southern Miss	2	–	5	3	–	8
Louisiana–Monroe	2	–	5	2	–	9
Championship: TBD vs. Louisiana Tech
$ – Conference champion; x – Division champion/co-champions; y – Championship game participant; As of November 22, 2026; Rankings from AP poll

The 2026 Arkansas State Red Wolves football team is the program that is represeting Arkansas State University in the Sun Belt Conference's West Division during the 2026 NCAA Division I FBS football season. The Red Wolves are led by Butch Jones in his sixth year as the head coach. The Red Wolves will play home games at Centennial Bank Stadium, located in Jonesboro, Arkansas.

== Offseason ==
=== Transfers ===
==== Outgoing ====
Player	Position	Destination
Odi Udom	DT	Abilene Christian
Ja'Quez Cross	RB	Appalachian State
Jaxson Dunn	P	Appalachian State
Drew Nicolson	LS	Arizona
Cody Sigler	DL	Auburn
Cedric Franklin II	CB	Ball State
Royce Baucom	IOL	Chattanooga
Kemari Nix	S	Delaware State
Gideon Herbert	EDGE	East Tennessee State
Tyrell Lewis	QB	Garden City CC
Cedric Hawkins	RB	Harding
Tyler Fortenberry	TE	Iowa State
Jaylen Raynor	QB	Iowa State
Jax Brown	QB	Kilgore
TJ Hill	S	Lehigh
Omarion Brown	RB	Louisiana
Damarcco Blanton	WR	Louisiana–Monroe
Riley McGehee	OT	Memphis
Demarcus Baker	S	Mississippi Gulf Coast CC
Josh Flowers	QB	Mississippi Gulf Coast CC
DJ Watkins	CB	Mississippi Gulf Coast CC
Jackson Waller	P	NC State
Aaron Alexander	LB	North Texas
Kobe Williams	IOL	Northwest Mississippi CC
Kameron Thomas	RB	Northwestern State
TJ Starks	WR	Pittsburg State
Jerry Horne	QB	South Alabama
Terry Kirksey Jr.	LB	South Alabama
Drew Collins	EDGE	South Carolina
Josh Stone	CB	Southeast Missouri State
Zuri Madison	IOL	Southern
Walker Davis	IOL	Southern Arkansas
Devyn Curtis	LB	Tennessee State
DD Murray	RB	Texas A&M
Javante Mackey	EDGE	Texas State
Jordan Sample	LB	Texas State
Quincy Wright	DL	Utah State
Antwine Beale	CB	Unknown
Chase Bogle	LB	Unknown
Quan Lee	WR	Unknown
Chris Pearson	LB	Unknown
Emmanuel Stevenson	TE	Unknown
Bryan Whitehead	EDGE	Unknown
Aidan Wright	LB	Unknown
Trenton Alan Yowe	CB	Unknown
AG McGhee	S	Withdrawn
Tristian Smith	IOL	Withdrawn

==== Incoming ====
Player	Position	Previous school
Tyeland Coleman	DL	Florida State
Manasse Itete	IOL	Florida State
Joshua Burrell	TE	Furman
Riley Smith	LS	Furman
Dontrae Henderson	CB	Indiana
Jaden Hamm	TE	Kansas
Five Hamilton	CB	Kennesaw State
Tre Stevens	LB	Lafayette
Nicolas Kalume	EDGE	Maine
Elias Sherman	DL	Maine
AJ Thomas	EDGE	McNeese
Shakai Woods	DL	Middle Tennessee
Joshua Ofor	LB	NC State
Sterling Wiggins	OT	North Carolina A&T
Donquarius Parker	EDGE	North Carolina Central
Daniel Vuckovic	P	Northern Illinois
Talan Chandler	IOL	Northwestern
Sam Hultz	DL	Pittsburg State
Bryson Ross	CB	Portland State
Jaden Haly	QB	Sacred Heart
Sultan Badmus	EDGE	Temple
Trey Owens	QB	Texas
Landry Cannon	IOL	Tulane
Jaylen Heyward	S	UCF
Kam Moore	LB	UCF
Noah Flores	CB	Utah State
Corey Reddick Jr.	RB	Valdosta State
Boski Barrett	WR	Vanderbilt
Drew Dickey	QB	Vanderbilt
Jeremy St-Hilaire	QB	Vanderbilt
Makai Shahid	S	Youngstown State

== Preseason ==
=== Media poll ===
In the Sun Belt preseason coaches' poll, the Red Wolves were picked to finish third place in the West division.

Running back Kenyon Clay, offensive lineman Tristian Smith, wide receiver Chauncy Cobb and defensive back AG McGhee were awarded to be in the preseason All-Sun Belt first team offense and defense. Kicker Clune Van Andel and return specialist and associated press player Chauncy Cobb were named to the All-Sun Belt first team special teams.

== Personnel ==
2026 Arkansas State Red Wolves football team roster
Players
Coaches
Offense

Pos.	#	Name	Class
WR	0	Nana Burris	Sr
WR	2	Chauncy Cobb	Jr
WR	3	Hunter Summers	Jr
RB	4	Devin Spencer	Jr
RB	5	Kenyon Clay	Sr
QB	6	Ethan Crawford	Jr
QB	7	Drew Dickey	Sr
RB	8	Corey Reddick	Sr
QB	9	Trey Owens	So
WR	10	Jaylen Bonelli	Sr
TE	11	Tyler Little	Jr
QB	12	Jérémy St-Hilaire	So
WR	13	Boski Barrett	So
WR	14	Andre Feast	Fr
WR	15	Andrew Jones	Fr
TE	16	Joshua Burrell	GS
TE	17	Jabari Bush	So
WR	18	Romel Stevens	Fr
TE	19	Jaden Hamm	Jr
WR	21	Deshaun Fedd	Fr
RB	22	Ezell Jolly	Jr
RB	23	Solomon Baggett	Fr
RB	24	Nasir Allen	Fr
RB	30	Damon Sisa	So
TE	31	Devyn Curtis	Sr
TE	41	Coleman Parmer	Fr
OL	50	Wil Saxton	Sr
OL	51	Cade Channell	Fr
OL	52	Mason Myers	Jr
OL	53	Talan Chandler	So
OL	55	Aleric Watson	Sr
OL	57	Dan'tay Ward Jr.	Fr
OL	58	Cameron Ambrose	Sr
OL	63	Aiden Kehm	So
OL	64	Noah Hacker	Fr
OL	65	Cape Johnson	Jr
OL	68	Tristian Smith	Sr
OL	69	Cooper Sherrod	Fr
OL	70	Manasse Itete	So
OL	71	Tanner Welch	Jr
OL	72	Sterling Wiggins	Jr
OL	73	Kobe Williams	So
OL	74	Landry Cannon	Jr
OL	75	JB Hoehn	Fr
OL	76	Trason Hunt	Fr
OL	77	Gabe Fortson	So
OL	79	Baker North	So
WR	80	Kena Rego	Fr
WR	81	Dallas Boozer	Fr
TE	82	Ezra Burgess	Jr
WR	84	Reed Linder	Sr
TE	86	AJ Carlson	So
TE	89	Andrew Staten	Fr

Defense

Pos.	#	Name	Class
CB	0	Dontrae Henderson	So
CB	1	Braden Jackson	Jr
CB	2	Jaylen Heyward	So
CB	3	Noah Flores	Jr
S	4	Makai Shahid	Jr
S	5	Five Hamilton	Jr
S	6	AG McGhee	Sr
CB	7	Courtney Patterson	Fr
S	8	Brandon Barnes	Jr
LB	9	Kam Moore	Sr
DE	10	Tony Carter	So
DE	11	Sultan Badmus	Jr
S	12	Bryson Ross	Jr
CB	13	Kyle Williams	So
DE	14	Donquarius Parker	Sr
S	15	Brandon Greil	Sr
S	16	Joe Drew	So
CB	17	Marquis Williams	So
S	18	Malekhi Weedon	So
CB	19	James Reed III	Sr
DE	20	TJ Grant	Jr
S	21	Malik McConico	Sr
LB	22	Nigel Nelson	So
LB	23	Tre Stevens	Jr
LB	24	Joshua Ofor	So
LB	25	Keoni Denny	Jr
DE	27	AJ Thomas	Jr
LB	28	Daniel Demery	Jr
CB	29	Luke Wisham	So
S	32	Paul Risper	Fr
LB	35	Rasheem Turner	Fr
LB	38	Noah Hamlin	Fr
DE	41	Aidan Wright	Fr
DE	42	Shaun Williams	Fr
DT	44	Sam Hultz	Sr
DE	45	Nicolas Kalume	Jr
LB	46	Nick Miller	Fr
DE	90	Lincoln Stueve	Fr
DT	91	Tyeland Coleman	Jr
DT	92	Elias Sherman	Jr
DT	95	Ryan Reese	So
DE	96	Ronnie Blossom	Fr
DT	98	Shakai Woods	Jr
DT	99	TJ Spann	Jr
DT		Trent Mapp	Jr

Special teams

Pos.	#	Name	Class
K	25	Clayton Amaya	Jr
LS	31	Xavier Ross	So
K	34	Clune Van Andel	Sr
K	39	Ethan Bowman	Fr
LS	42	Kyle Nill	Fr
LS	88	Riley Smith	Jr
P	90	Daniel Vuckovic	Jr

Head coach

- Butch Jones (Ferris State)

Coordinators/assistant coaches

- Garrett Altman (TCU)
  Offensive coordinator
- Griffin McCarley (West Alabama)
  Defensive coordinator
- Kwame Agyeman (Oregon)
  Safeties
- Nick Grimes (Sam Houston State)
  Offensive line / Run game coordinator
- Kenny Hill (TCU)
  Running backs
- Alex Jones (Tennessee)
  Tight ends
- Derrick Lett (Bowling Green State)
  Wide receivers
- Jalen Ortiz (Wyoming)
  Cornerbacks
- Rashad Pittman (Pittsburg State)
  Defensive tackles
- Malcolm Robinson (Minnesota)
  Defensive ends
- Kody Schexnayder (Mississippi State)
  Special teams coordinator

Legend

- (C) Team captain
- (S) Suspended
- (I) Ineligible
- Injured
- Redshirt

Roster
Last update: 1 June 2026

== Schedule ==
Date	Time	Opponent	Site	TV	Result	Attendance
September 5	6:00 p.m.	at Memphis*	Simmons Bank Liberty Stadium; Memphis, TN (Paint Bucket Bowl)	ESPN+	L 24–42	45,632
September 12	6:00 p.m.	West Georgia*	Centennial Bank Stadium; Jonesboro, AR	ESPN+	W 52–7	16,678
September 19	7:00 p.m.	at TCU*	Amon G. Carter Stadium; Fort Worth, TX	ESPNU	L 7–31	46,139
September 26	6:00 p.m.	Kennesaw State*	Centennial Bank Stadium; Jonesboro, AR	ESPN+	W 17–14	19,087
October 3	7:00 p.m.	at Louisiana	Cajun Field; Lafayette, LA	ESPN+	L 20–23	21,211
October 8	6:30 p.m.	South Alabama	Centennial Bank Stadium; Jonesboro, AR	ESPN2	L 49–56	14,237
October 17	6:00 p.m.	at Southern Miss	Renasant Stadium; Hattiesburg, MS	ESPN+	W 23–13	22,585
October 24	6:00 p.m.	Georgia State^{†}	Centennial Bank Stadium; Jonesboro, AR	ESPN+	W 38–32	17,767
November 7	2:00 p.m.	Louisiana–Monroe	Centennial Bank Stadium; Jonesboro, AR	ESPN+	L 17–19	17,185
November 14	12:00 p.m.	at Coastal Carolina	Brooks Stadium; Conway, SC	ESPN+	L 21–28	16,785
November 21	6:00 p.m.	at Louisiana Tech	Joe Aillet Stadium; Ruston, LA	ESPN+	L 3–48	15,316
November 28	2:00 p.m.	Troy	Centennial Bank Stadium; Jonesboro, AR	ESPN+		
*Non-conference game; ^{†}Homecoming; All times are in Central time

== Game summaries ==
=== at Memphis (Paint Bucket Bowl) ===
Arkansas State Red Wolves (0–0) at Memphis Tigers (0–0) – Game summary

Quarter	1	2	3	4	Total
Red Wolves	3	14	7	0	24
Tigers	0	21	14	7	42

at Simmons Bank Liberty Stadium • Memphis, Tennessee

- Date: September 5
- Game time: 6:00 p.m. CDT
- Game weather: Sunny • Temperature: 99 °F (37 °C) • Wind: E at 6 miles per hour (9.7 km/h)
- Game attendance: 45,632
- Referee: Steven Robinson
- TV announcers (ESPN+): Jeff Hem (play-by-play) and Kenechi Udeze (analyst)

Game information

First quarter

- ARST – Clune Van Andel 48-yard field goal, 1:44. Red Wolves 3–0. Drive: 6 plays, 5 yards, 3:42.

Second quarter

- MEM – Jaylin Carter 2-yard run (Philippe Laforge kick), 12:02. Tigers 7–3. Drive: 10 plays, 75 yards, 4:41.
- ARST – Kenyon Clay 1-yard run (Clune Van Andel kick), 7:42. Red Wolves 10–7. Drive: 8 plays, 75 yards, 4:20.
- MEM – Aidan O'Callaghan 7-yard pass from Marcus Stokes (Philippe Laforge kick), 3:37. Tigers 14–10. Drive: 9 plays, 85 yards, 4:01.
- ARST – Kenyon Clay 75-yard pass from Trey Owens (Clune Van Andel kick), 3:26. Red Wolves 17–14. Drive: 1 play, 75 yards, 0:11.
- MEM – Jermane Hayes 31-yard pass from Marcus Stokes (Philippe Laforge kick), 0:40. Tigers 21–17. Drive: 7 plays, 75 yards, 2:46.

Third quarter

- MEM – Jaylin Carter 13-yard run (Philippe Laforge kick), 12:19. Tigers 28–17. Drive: 6 plays, 75 yards, 2:41.
- ARST – Timothy Carter 1-yard run (Clune Van Andel kick), 4:12. Tigers 28–24. Drive: 5 plays, 72 yards, 2:04.
- MEM – Jaylin Carter 74-yard run (Philippe Laforge kick), 3:25. Tigers 35–24. Drive: 2 plays, 84 yards, 0:41.

Fourth quarter

- MEM – Jaylin Carter 24-yard run (Philippe Laforge kick), 3:31. Tigers 42–24. Drive: 8 plays, 67 yards, 4:42.

Statistics	ARST	MEM
First downs	22	24
Plays–yards	59–434	63–523
Rushes–yards	29–109	48–335
Passing yards	325	188
Passing: comp–att–int	21–30–4	12–15–2
Turnovers	4	2
Time of possession	30:33	29:27

Team	Category	Player	Statistics
Arkansas State	Passing	Trey Owens	21/30, 325 yards, TD, 4 INT
Arkansas State	Rushing	Kenyon Clay	13 carries, 50 yards, TD
Arkansas State	Receiving	Hunter Summers	5 receptions, 98 yards
Memphis	Passing	Marcus Stokes	12/15, 188 yards, 2 TD, 2 INT
Memphis	Rushing	Jaylin Carter	19 carries, 183 yards, 4 TD
Memphis	Receiving	Brady Kluse	1 reception, 40 yards

=== West Georgia (FCS) ===
West Georgia Wolves (FCS) (0–2) at Arkansas State Red Wolves (0–1) – Game summary

Quarter	1	2	3	4	Total
Wolves (FCS)	0	7	0	0	7
Red Wolves	0	21	17	14	52

at Centennial Bank Stadium • Jonesboro, Arkansas

- Date: September 12
- Game time: 6:00 p.m. CDT
- Game weather: Sunny • Temperature: 93 °F (34 °C) • Wind: NW at 5 mph
- Game attendance: 16,678
- Referee: Marty Adams
- TV announcers (ESPN+): Graham Doty and Pete Cordelli

Game information

First quarter

- No scoring plays.

Second quarter

- ARST – Chauncy Cobb 28-yard pass from Trey Owens (Clune Van Andel kick), 12:50. Red Wolves 7–0. Drive: 10 plays, 84 yards, 5:18.
- ARST – Jaylen Bonelli 30-yard pass from Trey Owens (Clune Van Andel kick), 5:28. Red Wolves 14–0. Drive: 8 plays, 57 yards, 4:43.
- ARST – Noah Flores 68-yard fumble return (Clune Van Andel kick), 1:19. Red Wolves 21–0.
- UWG – T.J. Lockley 37-yard pass from Colton Fitzgerald (Logan Lopez kick), 0:05. Red Wolves 21–7. Drive: 9 plays, 60 yards, 1:14.

Third quarter

- ARST – Five Hamilton 91-yard interception return (Clune Van Andel kick), 11:13. Red Wolves 28–7.
- ARST – Kenyon Clay 5-yard run (Clune Van Andel kick), 8:26. Red Wolves 35–7. Drive: 6 plays, 31 yards, 2:36.
- ARST – Clune Van Andel 25-yard field goal, 1:43. Red Wolves 38–7. Drive: 10 plays, 31 yards, 5:14.

Fourth quarter

- ARST – Drew Dickey 4-yard run (Clune Van Andel kick), 9:49. Red Wolves 45–7. Drive: 10 plays, 70 yards, 5:49.
- ARST – Solomon Baggett 33-yard run (Clune Van Andel kick), 2:31. Red Wolves 52–7. Drive: 4 plays, 80 yards, 2:34.

Statistics	UWG	ARST
First downs	13	21
Plays–yards	58–246	57–391
Rushes–yards	24–72	40–256
Passing yards	174	135
Passing: comp–att–int	19–34–2	13–17–0
Turnovers	4	1
Time of possession	27:58	32:02

Team	Category	Player	Statistics
West Georgia	Passing	Colton Fitzgerald	14/24, 149 yards, TD, 2 INT
West Georgia	Rushing	Christian Monfort	6 carries, 20 yards
West Georgia	Receiving	T.J. Lockley	6 receptions, 76 yards, TD
Arkansas State	Passing	Trey Owens	13/17, 135 yards, 2 TD
Arkansas State	Rushing	Solomon Baggett	8 carries, 70 yards, TD
Arkansas State	Receiving	Chauncy Cobb	4 receptions, 54 yards, TD

=== at TCU ===
Arkansas State Red Wolves (1-1) at TCU Horned Frogs (1-1) – Game summary

Quarter	1	2	3	4	Total
Red Wolves	0	7	0	0	7
Horned Frogs	7	7	7	10	31

at Amon G. Carter Stadium • Fort Worth, Texas

- Date: September 19
- Game time: 7:00 p.m. CDT
- Game weather: Sunny • Temperature: 96 °F (36 °C) • Wind: SE 11 mph
- Game attendance: 46,139
- Referee: Luke Richmond
- TV announcers (ESPNU): Ted Emrich (play-by-play) and Fozzy Whittaker (analyst)

Game information

First quarter

- TCU – Jeremy Payne 3-yard run (Nate McCashland kick), 8:36. Horned Frogs 7–0. Drive: 10 plays, 76 yards, 4:51.

Second quarter

- TCU – Ed Small 17-yard pass from Jaden Craig (Nate McCashland kick), 5:10. Horned Frogs 14–0. Drive: 5 plays, 77 yards, 2:24.
- ARST – Ezell Jolly 1-yard run (Clune Van Andel kick), 1:05. Horned Frogs 14–7. Drive: 4 plays, 84 yards, 0:44.

Third quarter

- TCU – Ka'Morreun Pimpton 9-yard pass from Jaden Craig (Nate McCashland kick), 0:17. Horned Frogs 21–7. Drive: 14 plays, 99 yards, 8:00.

Fourth quarter

- TCU – Nate McCashland 29-yard field goal, 8:36. Horned Frogs 24–7. Drive: 11 plays, 78 yards, 6:54.
- TCU – Kari Ashley 29-yard pass from Jaden Craig (Nate McCashland kick), 1:52. Horned Frogs 31–7. Drive: 4 plays, 33 yards, 2:12.

Statistics	ARST	TCU
First downs	11	21
Plays–yards	54-261	68-468
Rushes–yards	30-128	39-131
Passing yards	133	337
Passing: comp–att–int	11-24-0	21-29-1
Time of possession	25:26	34:34

Team	Category	Player	Statistics
Arkansas State	Passing	Trey Owens	11/24, 133 yards
Arkansas State	Rushing	Trey Owens	7 carries, 58 yards
Arkansas State	Receiving	Hunter Summers	3 receptions, 47 yards
TCU	Passing	Jaden Craig	21/29, 337 yards, 3 TDs, INT
TCU	Rushing	Jeremy Payne	24 carries, 86 yards, TD
TCU	Receiving	Ed Small	7 receptions, 164 yards, TD

=== Kennesaw State ===
Kennesaw State Owls (1–2) at Arkansas State Red Wolves (1–2) – Game summary

Quarter	1	2	3	4	Total
Owls	0	0	0	0	0
Red Wolves	0	0	0	0	0

at Centennial Bank Stadium • Jonesboro, Arkansas

- Date: September 26
- Game time: 6:00 p.m. CDT
- TV announcers (ESPN+): Graham Doty and Pete Cordelli

Game information

First quarter
Second quarter
Third quarter
Fourth quarter

Statistics	KENN	ARST
First downs		
Plays–yards		
Rushes–yards		
Passing yards		
Passing: comp–att–int		
Time of possession		

Team	Category	Player	Statistics
Kennesaw State	Passing		
Kennesaw State	Rushing		
Kennesaw State	Receiving		
Arkansas State	Passing		
Arkansas State	Rushing		
Arkansas State	Receiving		

=== at Louisiana ===
Arkansas State Red Wolves (2–2) at Louisiana Ragin' Cajuns (3–1) – Game summary

Quarter	1	2	3	4	Total
Red Wolves	0	0	0	0	0
Ragin' Cajuns	0	0	0	0	0

at Cajun Field • Lafayette, Louisiana

- Date: October 3
- Game time: 7:00 p.m. CDT
- Game attendance: 21,211
- TV announcers (ESPN+): Dan McDonald (play-by-play) and Eric Mouton (analyst)

Statistics	ARST	LA
First downs		
Plays–yards		
Rushes–yards		
Passing yards		
Passing: comp–att–int		
Time of possession		

Team	Category	Player	Statistics
Arkansas State	Passing		
Arkansas State	Rushing		
Arkansas State	Receiving		
Louisiana	Passing		
Louisiana	Rushing		
Louisiana	Receiving		

=== South Alabama ===
South Alabama Jaguars (3–2) at Arkansas State Red Wolves (2–3) – Game summary

Quarter	1	2	3	4	Total
Jaguars	14	20	15	7	56
Red Wolves	7	21	7	14	49

at Centennial Bank Stadium • Jonesboro, Arkansas

- Date: October 8
- Game time: 6:30 p.m. CDT
- Game weather: Sunny • Temperature: 83 °F (28 °C) • Wind: NE at 6 miles per hour (9.7 km/h)
- Game attendance: 14,237
- Referee: Jeremy Parker
- TV announcers (ESPN2): Dave Neal (play-by-play) and Cole Cubelic (analyst)

Game information

First quarter

- (7:21) USA – PJ Martin 6-yard run, Davis Little kick (Drive: 13 plays, 78 yards, 6:09; South Alabama 7–0)
- (1:44) ARST – Timothy Carter 1-yard run, Clune Van Andel kick (Drive: 11 plays, 80 yards, 5:33; Tied 7–7)
- (1:31) USA – Keenan Phillips 100-yard kickoff return, Davis Little kick (South Alabama 14–7)

Second quarter

- (12:56) ARST – Hunter Summers 19-yard pass from Trey Owens, Clune Van Andel kick (Drive: 7 plays, 86 yards, 3:30; Tied 14–14)
- (6:16) ARST – Timothy Carter 1-yard run, Clune Van Andel kick (Drive: 10 plays, 57 yards, 5:16; Arkansas State 21–14)
- (4:37) USA – Keenan Phillips 3-yard run, Davis Little kick (Drive: 4 plays, 74 yards, 1:39; Tied 21–21)
- (1:51) USA – Jared Hollins 3-yard run, Davis Little kick (Drive: 6 plays, 28 yards, 2:01; South Alabama 28–21)
- (1:29) USA – Jared Hollins 3-yard run (Drive: 2 plays, 12 yards, 0:09; South Alabama 34–21)
- (0:32) ARST – Hunter Summers 20-yard pass from Trey Owens, Clune Van Andel kick (Drive: 4 plays, 73 yards, 0:52; South Alabama 34–28)

Third quarter

- (13:29) USA – Keenan Phillips 23-yard run, Jared Hollins rush (Drive: 3 plays, 74 yards, 1:27; South Alabama 42–28)
- (4:36) USA – Rod Gibbs 7-yard pass from Jared Hollins, David Little kick (Drive: 6 plays, 26 yards, 3:29; South Alabama 49–28)
- (1:10) ARST – Solomon Baggett 4-yard pass from Trey Owens, Clune Van Andel kick (Drive: 9 plays, 75 yards, 3:26; South Alabama 49–35)

Fourth quarter

- (14:52) USA – Keenan Phillips 42-yard run, Davis Little kick (Drive: 4 plays, 75 yards, 1:18; South Alabama 56–35)
- (12:18) ARST – Jabari Bush 15-yard pass from Trey Owens, Clune Van Andel kick (Drive: 2 plays, 15 yards, 0:09; South Alabama 56–42)
- (6:51) ARST – Trey Owens 1-yard run, Clune Van Andel kick (Drive: 10 plays, 81 yards, 3:14; South Alabama 56–49)

Statistics	USA	ARST
First downs	21	31
Plays–yards	60–372	70–516
Rushes–yards	50–296	27–98
Passing yards	76	418
Passing: comp–att–int	6–10–0	32–43–2
Time of possession	28:39	31:21

Team	Category	Player	Statistics
South Alabama	Passing	Jared Hollins	6/10, 76 yards, TD
South Alabama	Rushing	Keenan Phillips	19 carries, 157 yards, 3 TD
South Alabama	Receiving	Brendan Jenkins	1 reception, 36 yards
Arkansas State	Passing	Trey Owens	32/43, 418 yards, 4 TD, 2 INT
Arkansas State	Rushing	Trey Owens	11 carries, 28 yards, TD
Arkansas State	Receiving	Hunter Summers	9 receptions, 145 yards, 2 TD

=== at Southern Miss ===
Arkansas State Red Wolves (2–4) at Southern Miss Golden Eagles (1–4) – Game summary

Quarter	1	2	3	4	Total
Red Wolves	0	0	0	0	0
Golden Eagles	0	0	0	0	0

at M. M. Roberts Stadium • Hattiesburg, Mississippi

- Date: October 17

Statistics	ARST	USM
First downs		
Plays–yards		
Rushes–yards		
Passing yards		
Passing: comp–att–int		
Time of possession		

Team	Category	Player	Statistics
Arkansas State	Passing		
Arkansas State	Rushing		
Arkansas State	Receiving		
Southern Miss	Passing		
Southern Miss	Rushing		
Southern Miss	Receiving		

=== Georgia State ===
Georgia State Panthers (4–2) at Arkansas State Red Wolves (3–4) – Game summary

Quarter	1	2	3	4	Total
Panthers	0	0	0	0	0
Red Wolves	0	0	0	0	0

at Centennial Bank Stadium • Jonesboro, Arkansas

- Date: October 24
- Game time: 6:00 p.m. CDT

Game information

First quarter
Second quarter
Third quarter
Fourth quarter

Statistics	GAST	ARST
First downs		
Plays–yards		
Rushes–yards		
Passing yards		
Passing: comp–att–int		
Time of possession		

Team	Category	Player	Statistics
Georgia State	Passing		
Georgia State	Rushing		
Georgia State	Receiving		
Arkansas State	Passing		
Arkansas State	Rushing		
Arkansas State	Receiving		

=== Louisiana–Monroe ===
Louisiana–Monroe Warhawks (1–7) at Arkansas State Red Wolves (4–4) – Game summary

Quarter	1	2	3	4	Total
Warhawks	0	0	0	0	0
Red Wolves	0	0	0	0	0

at Centennial Bank Stadium • Jonesboro, Arkansas

- Date: November 7
- Game time: 2:00 p.m. CDT

Game information

First quarter
Second quarter
Third quarter
Fourth quarter

Statistics	ULM	ARST
First downs		
Plays–yards		
Rushes–yards		
Passing yards		
Passing: comp–att–int		
Time of possession		

Team	Category	Player	Statistics
Louisiana–Monroe	Passing		
Louisiana–Monroe	Rushing		
Louisiana–Monroe	Receiving		
Arkansas State	Passing		
Arkansas State	Rushing		
Arkansas State	Receiving		

=== at Coastal Carolina ===
Arkansas State Red Wolves (4–5) at Coastal Carolina Chanticleers (3–6) – Game summary

Quarter	1	2	3	4	Total
Red Wolves	0	0	0	0	0
Chanticleers	0	0	0	0	0

at Brooks Stadium • Conway, South Carolina

- Date: November 14

Statistics	ARST	CCU
First downs		
Plays–yards		
Rushes–yards		
Passing yards		
Passing: comp–att–int		
Time of possession		

Team	Category	Player	Statistics
Arkansas State	Passing		
Arkansas State	Rushing		
Arkansas State	Receiving		
Coastal Carolina	Passing		
Coastal Carolina	Rushing		
Coastal Carolina	Receiving		

=== at Louisiana Tech ===
Arkansas State Red Wolves (4–6) at Louisiana Tech Bulldogs (8–2) – Game summary

Quarter	1	2	3	4	Total
Red Wolves	0	0	0	0	0
Bulldogs	0	0	0	0	0

at Joe Aillet Stadium • Ruston, Louisiana

- Date: November 21

Statistics	ARST	LT
First downs		
Plays–yards		
Rushes–yards		
Passing yards		
Passing: comp–att–int		
Time of possession		

Team	Category	Player	Statistics
Arkansas State	Passing		
Arkansas State	Rushing		
Arkansas State	Receiving		
Louisiana Tech	Passing		
Louisiana Tech	Rushing		
Louisiana Tech	Receiving		

=== Troy ===
Troy Trojans (0–0) at Arkansas State Red Wolves (0–0) – Game summary

Quarter	1	2	3	4	Total
Trojans	0	0	0	0	0
Red Wolves	0	0	0	0	0

at Centennial Bank Stadium • Jonesboro, Arkansas

- Date: November 28
- Game time: 2:00 p.m. CDT

Game information

First quarter
Second quarter
Third quarter
Fourth quarter

Statistics	TROY	ARST
First downs		
Plays–yards		
Rushes–yards		
Passing yards		
Passing: comp–att–int		
Time of possession		

Team	Category	Player	Statistics
Troy	Passing		
Troy	Rushing		
Troy	Receiving		
Arkansas State	Passing		
Arkansas State	Rushing		
Arkansas State	Receiving		
