= 2026 Sun Belt Conference football season =

- League: NCAA Division I Football Bowl Subdivision
- Sport: Football
- Duration: September 4, 2026 – December 4, 2026
- Teams: 14

2027 NFL draft

Regular season

SBC Championship Game

Seasons
- ← 2025 2027 →

2026 Sun Belt Conference football standings
	Conf.			Overall
Team	W		L	W		L
East Division
Georgia Southern	6	–	1	7	–	4
James Madison	5	–	2	8	–	3
Appalachian State	4	–	3	7	–	4
Coastal Carolina	3	–	4	4	–	7
Marshall	3	–	4	6	–	5
Georgia State	2	–	5	5	–	6
Old Dominion	2	–	5	3	–	8
West Division
Louisiana Tech xy	7	–	0	9	–	2
Louisiana	5	–	2	8	–	3
South Alabama	4	–	3	6	–	5
Arkansas State	2	–	5	4	–	7
Troy	2	–	5	4	–	7
Southern Miss	2	–	5	3	–	8
Louisiana–Monroe	2	–	5	2	–	9
Championship: TBD vs. Louisiana Tech
$ – Conference champion; x – Division champion/co-champions; y – Championship game participant; As of November 22, 2026; Rankings from AP poll

The 2026 Sun Belt Conference football season is the 26th season of college football play for the Sun Belt Conference (SBC) as part of the 2026 NCAA Division I FBS football season. The season will begin on September 4, 2026, and will conclude with the Conference Championship Game on December 4, 2026. The conference consists of 14 football members split into two divisions. The conference released its full season schedule on March 13, 2026.

== Conference realignment ==
Prior to the 2026–27 season, the Sun Belt saw one team depart the conference, while one new team joined the conference, keeping the overall total of teams at 14. Texas State University left the Sun Belt to join the Pac-12 Conference, which they had initially announced prior to the 2025 season. Louisiana Tech University joined the Sun Belt in 2026 after departing Conference USA. The move by Louisiana Tech was not initially approved by CUSA, and the school appeared in both the CUSA and Sun Belt's original schedules for 2026. Louisiana Tech initiated a lawsuit against CUSA, claiming that CUSA declined to facilitate a resolution despite numerous notices of Louisiana Tech's intent to depart the conference. The school and CUSA settled out of court a month later, allowing Louisiana Tech to officially move to the Sun Belt on July 1, while CUSA received an undisclosed amount in exit fees.

== Preseason ==
=== Preseason Media Poll ===
The SBC released its preseason poll on July 13. James Madison was named the favorite to win the East Division, while Troy was named the favorite to win the West Division.

East
Predicted finish	Team	Votes (1st place)
1	James Madison	94 (11)
2	Old Dominion	73 (1)
3	Marshall	67
4	Georgia Southern	53 (1)
5	Coastal Carolina	45 (1)
6	Appalachian State	43
7	Georgia State	17

West
Predicted finish	Team	Votes (1st place)
1	Troy	96 (12)
2	Louisiana	75 (1)
3	Arkansas State	69
4	Louisiana Tech	55
5	Southern Miss	47 (1)
6	South Alabama	31
7	Louisiana–Monroe	19

=== Preseason All-Conference teams ===
- Offensive Player of the Year: Carlos Del Rio-Wilson (RS Senior, Marshall, quarterback)
- Defensive Player of the Year: Donnie Smith (Senior, Troy, defensive lineman)
- Special Teams Player of the Year: Evan Crenshaw (Senior, Troy, punter)

Position	Player	Team
First Team Offense
QB	Carlos Del Rio-Wilson	Marshall
RB	Kenyon Clay	Arkansas State
RB	Devin Roche	Old Dominion
OL	Tristian Smith	Arkansas State
OL	Zach Greenberg	James Madison
OL	AJ Vinson	Louisiana–Monroe
OL	Tariq Montgomery	Marshall
OL	Jalen Slappy	Marshall
TE	Toby Payne	Marshall
WR	Chauncy Cobb	Arkansas State
WR	Shelton Sampson Jr.	Louisiana
WR	Adrian Norton	Marshall
First Team Defense
DL	Aiden Benton	Appalachian State
DL	MJ Stroud	Georgia Southern
DL	Amar Thomas	James Madison
DL	Donnie Smith	Troy
LB	Colton Phares	Appalachian State
LB	Noah Flemmings	Louisiana–Monroe
LB	Kolbe Fields	Louisiana Tech
DB	AG McGhee	Arkansas State
DB	Ja’Marion Wayne	Coastal Carolina
DB	Chance Gamble	Georgia Southern
DB	Brent Gordon Jr.	Louisiana
DB	Daytione Smith	Marshall
First Team Special Teams
K	Clune Van Andel	Arkansas State
P	Evan Crenshaw	Troy
RS	Chauncy Cobb	Arkansas State
AP	Chauncy Cobb	Arkansas State

Position	Player	Team
Second Team Offense
QB	Goose Crowder	Troy
RB	George Pettaway	James Madison
RB	Keenan Phillips	South Alabama
OL	Tyriq Poindexter	Appalachian State
OL	Kaden Moreau	Louisiana
OL	Ethan Hubbard	South Alabama
OL	Kenton Jerido	South Alabama
OL	Jordon Jones	Troy
TE	Eli Finley	Louisiana Tech
WR	Josh Dallas	Georgia Southern
WR	Nic Trujillo	Louisiana–Monroe
WR	Anthony Eager	South Alabama
Second Team Defense
DL	Anthony Bynum	Georgia Southern
DL	Fitzgerald West Jr.	Louisiana
DL	Braydin Ward	Marshall
DL	Chris Forbes	Old Dominion
LB	Tray Brown	Coastal Carolina
LB	Brandon Tyson	Georgia Southern
LB	Javae Gilmore	Marshall
DB	Myles Woods	Coastal Carolina
DB	Jabari Tiller	Louisiana–Monroe
DB	Mario Easterly	Old Dominion
DB	Zion Frink	Old Dominion
DB	Justin Powe	Troy
Second Team Special Teams
K	Tripp Bryant	Georgia Southern
P	Alex Smith	Georgia Southern
RS	Xayvion Turner-Bradshaw	Marshall
AP	Jordan Lovett	Troy

== Head Coaches ==
- On November 30, 2025, Coastal Carolina fired head coach Tim Beck. On December 11, 2025, the school announced Ryan Beard as the new head coach.
- On December 6, 2025, Southern Miss head coach Charles Huff was announced as the new head coach of Memphis in the American Conference. On December 11, 2025, Blake Anderson was announced as Southern Miss's new head coach for 2026.
- On December 6, 2025, James Madison head coach Bob Chesney was announced as the new head coach of UCLA in the Big Ten Conference. On the same day, James Madison announced Billy Napier as their new head coach.

Team	Head coach	Previous job	Years at school	Overall record	Sun Belt record	Sun Belt titles
Appalachian State	Dowell Loggains	South Carolina (Offensive coordinator/QBs coach)	2	5–8 (.385)	2–6 (.250)	0
Arkansas State	Butch Jones	Alabama (assistant coach)	6	110–91 (.547)	16–24 (.400)	0
Coastal Carolina	Ryan Beard	Missouri State (head coach)	1	19–16 (.543)	0–0 (–)	0
Georgia Southern	Clay Helton	USC (head coach)	5	73–49 (.598)	16–16 (.500)	0
Georgia State	Dell McGee	Georgia (RB coach/run game coordinator)	3	5–20 (.200)	1–15 (.063)	0
James Madison	Billy Napier	Florida (head coach)	1	62–35 (.639)	27–5 (.844)	0
Louisiana	Michael Desormeaux	Louisiana (co-offensive coordinator)	5	29–25 (.537)	19–13 (.594)	0
Louisiana–Monroe	Bryant Vincent	New Mexico (offensive coordinator)	3	15–22 (.405)	4–12 (.250)	0
Louisiana Tech	Sonny Cumbie	Texas Tech (offensive coordinator/interim head coach)	5	21–34 (.382)	0–0 (–)	0
Marshall	Tony Gibson	NC State (Defensive coordinator/Linebackers coach)	2	5–7 (.417)	3–5 (.375)	0
Old Dominion	Ricky Rahne	Penn State (offensive coordinator)	7	30–33 (.476)	22–18 (.550)	0
South Alabama	Major Applewhite	South Alabama (offensive coordinator)	3	26–25 (.510)	8–8 (.500)	0
Southern Miss	Blake Anderson	Southern Miss (offensive coordinator)	1	74–55 (.574)	39–18 (.684)	0
Troy	Gerad Parker	Notre Dame (offensive coordinator)	3	12–20 (.375)	9–7 (.563)	0

== Rankings ==
		Pre	Wk 1	Wk 2	Wk 3	Wk 4	Wk 5	Wk 6	Wk 7	Wk 8	Wk 9	Wk 10	Wk 11	Wk 12	Wk 13	Wk 14	Wk 15	Final
Appalachian State	AP																	
Appalachian State	C																	
Appalachian State	CFP	Not released																
Arkansas State	AP																	
Arkansas State	C																	
Arkansas State	CFP	Not released																
Coastal Carolina	AP																	
Coastal Carolina	C																	
Coastal Carolina	CFP	Not released																
Georgia Southern	AP																	
Georgia Southern	C																	
Georgia Southern	CFP	Not released																
Georgia State	AP																	
Georgia State	C																	
Georgia State	CFP	Not released																
James Madison	AP	RV	RV	RV	RV	RV	RV	RV	RV									
James Madison	C	RV			RV	RV	RV	RV	RV	RV								
James Madison	CFP	Not released																
Louisiana	AP																	
Louisiana	C																	
Louisiana	CFP	Not released																
Louisiana–Monroe	AP																	
Louisiana–Monroe	C																	
Louisiana–Monroe	CFP	Not released																
Louisiana Tech	AP																	
Louisiana Tech	C																	
Louisiana Tech	CFP	Not released																
Marshall	AP																	
Marshall	C																	
Marshall	CFP	Not released																
Old Dominion	AP																	
Old Dominion	C																	
Old Dominion	CFP	Not released																
South Alabama	AP																	
South Alabama	C																	
South Alabama	CFP	Not released																
Southern Miss	AP																	
Southern Miss	C																	
Southern Miss	CFP	Not released																
Troy	AP																	
Troy	C																	
Troy	CFP	Not released																

Legend
	Improvement in ranking
	Drop in ranking
	Not ranked previous week
	No change in ranking from previous week
RV	Received votes but were not ranked in Top 25 of poll
т	Tied with team above or below also with this symbol

AP -

Coaches -

CFP -

== Schedule ==
The 2026 schedule was released on February 13, 2026.

Index to colors and formatting
Sun Belt member won
Sun Belt member lost
Sun Belt teams in **bold**

=== Week 1 ===
Date	Time	Visiting team	Home team	Site	TV	Result	Attendance	Ref.
September 4	6:00 p.m.	North Carolina A&T	**Georgia State**	Center Parc Stadium • Atlanta, GA	ESPN+	**W** 59–10	16,703	
September 5	11:00 a.m.	**Coastal Carolina**	West Virginia	Milan Puskar Stadium • Morgantown, WV	TNT	**L** 24–31	54,158	
September 5	11:00 a.m.	Liberty	**James Madison**	Bridgeforth Stadium • Harrisonburg, VA (Battle of the Blue Ridge)	ESPNU	**W** 20–13	25,035	
September 5	2:30 p.m.	**Marshall**	No. 18 Penn State	Beaver Stadium • University Park, PA	FS1	**L** 0–45	108,489	
September 5	2:30 p.m.	Maine	**Appalachian State**	Kidd Brewer Stadium • Boone, NC	ESPN+	**W** 55–3	33,664	
September 5	4:00 p.m.	Alcorn State	**Southern Miss**	Renasant Stadium • Hattiesburg, MS	ESPN+	**W** 49–3	26,246	
September 5	5:00 p.m.	Norfolk State	**Old Dominion**	S.B. Ballard Stadium • Norfolk, VA (rivalry)	ESPN+	**W** 31–10	21,944	
September 5	6:00 p.m.	**Arkansas State**	Memphis	Simmons Bank Liberty Stadium • Memphis, TN (Paint Bucket Bowl)	ESPN+	**L** 24–42	46,352	
September 5	6:00 p.m.	Charleston Southern	**Georgia Southern**	Paulson Stadium • Statesboro, GA	ESPN+	**W** 31–0	22,426	
September 5	6:00 p.m.	Southeastern Louisiana	**South Alabama**	Hancock Whitney Stadium • Mobile, AL	ESPN+	**W** 39–14	15,087	
September 5	6:00 p.m.	Sam Houston	**Troy**	Veterans Memorial Stadium • Troy, AL	ESPN+	**W** 24–21	24,356	
September 5	6:30 p.m.	**Louisiana–Monroe**	Mississippi State	Davis Wade Stadium • Starkville, MS	ESPNU	**L** 13–62	48,771	
September 5	6:30 p.m.	Northwestern State	**Louisiana Tech**	Joe Aillet Stadium • Ruston, LA (rivalry)	ESPN+	**W** 80–6	13,108	
September 5	7:00 p.m.	No. 14 (FCS) Lamar	**Louisiana**	Cajun Field • Lafayette, LA (Sabine Shoe)	ESPN+	**W** 38–7	20,851	
^{#}Rankings from AP Poll released prior to game. All times are in Central Time.

=== Week 2 ===
Date	Time	Visiting team	Home team	Site	TV	Result	Attendance	Ref.
September 12	11:00 a.m.	**Old Dominion**	Virginia Tech	Lane Stadium • Blacksburg, VA	The CW	**L** 21–44	65,632	
September 12	11:00 a.m.	**Appalachian State**	East Carolina	Dowdy–Ficklen Stadium • Greenville, NC	ESPNU	**W** 27–24	40,074	
September 12	11:00 a.m.	Wagner	**James Madison**	Bridgeforth Stadium • Harrisonburg, VA	ESPN+	**W** 87–3	25,028	
September 12	2:30 p.m.	**Louisiana–Monroe**	UAB	Protective Stadium • Birmingham, AL	ESPN+	**L** 20–26	21,153	
September 12	3:00 p.m.	Alabama State	**Troy**	Veterans Memorial Stadium • Troy, AL	ESPN+	**W** 34–17	26,634	
September 12	6:00 p.m.	**South Alabama**	Tulane	Yulman Stadium • New Orleans, LA	ESPN+	**L** 24–28	24,323	
September 12	6:00 p.m.	West Georgia	**Arkansas State**	Centennial Bank Stadium • Jonesboro, AR	ESPN+	**W** 52–7	16,678	
September 12	6:00 p.m.	**Georgia State**	Kennesaw State	Fifth Third Stadium • Kennesaw, GA	ESPN+	**W** 31–17	11,040	
September 12	6:00 p.m.	Middle Tennessee	**Marshall**	Joan C. Edwards Stadium • Huntington, WV	ESPN+	**W** 28–26	25,662	
September 12	6:30 p.m.	**Louisiana Tech**	No. 9 LSU	Tiger Stadium • Baton Rouge, LA	SECN+	**L** 14–45	102,321	
September 12	6:30 p.m.	**Georgia Southern**	Clemson	Memorial Stadium • Clemson, SC	ACCN	**L** 7–22	81,150	
September 12	6:30 p.m.	Fordham	**Coastal Carolina**	Brooks Stadium • Conway, SC	ESPN+	**W** 45–7	22,273	
September 12	6:45 p.m.	**Southern Miss**	Auburn	Jordan–Hare Stadium • Auburn, AL	SECN	**L** 8–43	88,043	
September 12	10:00 p.m.	**Louisiana**	No. 14 USC	Los Angeles Memorial Coliseum • Los Angeles, CA	BTN	**L** 30–49	60,019	
^{#}Rankings from AP Poll released prior to game. All times are in Central Time.

=== Week 3 ===
Date	Time	Visiting team	Home team	Site	TV	Result	Attendance	Ref.
September 19	10:30 a.m.	**Coastal Carolina**	Delaware	Delaware Stadium • Newark, DE	CBSSN	**L** 14–22	17,937	
September 19	3:00 p.m.	**Louisiana Tech**	Baylor	McLane Stadium • Waco, TX	ESPNU	**L** 19–36	41,343	
September 19	3:30 p.m.	Southeastern Louisiana	**Louisiana–Monroe**	Malone Stadium • Monroe, LA	ESPN+	**L** 35–38		
September 19	5:00 p.m.	East Carolina	**Old Dominion**	S.B. Ballard Stadium • Norfolk, VA	ESPN+	**L** 17–20	21,444	
September 19	5:00 p.m.	Charlotte	**Appalachian State**	Kidd Brewer Stadium • Boone, NC	ESPN+	**W** 26–21	28,296	
September 19	5:30 p.m.	**Marshall**	Missouri State	Robert W. Plaster Stadium • Springfield, MO	CBSSN	**W** 30–24	16,010	
September 19	6:00 p.m.	**Troy**	No. 20 Missouri	Faurot Field • Columbia, MO	SECN+	**L** 17–27	63,609	
September 19	6:00 p.m.	**Georgia State**	UCF	Acrisure Bounce House • Orlando, FL	ESPN+	**L** 30–44	44,620	
September 19	6:00 p.m.	UConn	**Southern Miss**	Renasant Stadium • Hattiesburg, MS	ESPN+	**L** 20–48	23,025	
September 19	6:00 p.m.	Ohio	**South Alabama**	Hancock Whitney Stadium • Mobile, AL	ESPN+	**W** 41–35	15,232	
September 19	6:00 p.m.	**Georgia Southern**	Jacksonville State	AmFirst Stadium • Jacksonville, AL	ESPN+	**L** 27–31	16,142	
September 19	7:00 p.m.	**Arkansas State**	TCU	Amon G. Carter Stadium • Fort Worth, TX	ESPNU	**L** 7–31	46,139	
September 19	6:00 p.m.	UAB	**Louisiana**	Cajun Field • Lafayette, LA	ESPN+	**W** 21–14	18,216	
September 19	9:00 p.m.	**James Madison**	San Diego State	Snapdragon Stadium • San Diego, CA	The CW	**W** 26–13	26,487	
^{#}Rankings from AP Poll released prior to game. All times are in Central Time.

=== Week 4 ===
Date	Time	Visiting team	Home team	Site	TV	Result	Attendance	Ref.
September 24	6:30 p.m.	Liberty	**Coastal Carolina**	Brooks Stadium • Conway, SC (rivalry)	ESPN	**L** 17–34	22,116	
September 26	11:45 a.m.	**South Alabama**	Kentucky	Kroger Field • Lexington, KY	SECN	**L** 21–45	61,127	
September 26	1:00 p.m.	Northern Illinois	**Georgia State**	Center Parc Stadium • Atlanta, GA	ESPN+	**W** 35–14	16,608	
September 26	2:30 p.m.	Gardner-Webb	**Marshall**	Joan C. Edwards Stadium • Huntington, WV	ESPN+	**W** 36–35	25,710	
September 26	3:00 p.m.	No. 25 Houston	**Georgia Southern**	Paulson Stadium • Statesboro, GA	ESPN2	**L** 28–42	24,112	
September 26	5:00 p.m.	**James Madison**	**Old Dominion**	S.B. Ballard Stadium • Norfolk, VA (Royal Rivalry)	ESPN+	**JMU** 46–20	20,035	
September 26	5:30 p.m.	**Louisiana**	Charlotte	Jerry Richardson Stadium • Charlotte, NC	ESPN+	**W** 34–7	14,311	
September 26	6:00 p.m.	Kennesaw State	**Arkansas State**	Centennial Bank Stadium • Jonesboro, AR	ESPN+	**W** 17–14	19,087	
September 26	6:00 p.m.	**Southern Miss**	Tulane	Yulman Stadium • New Orleans, LA (Battle for the Bell)	ESPN+	**L** 21–24	22,984	
September 26	6:30 p.m.	**Appalachian State**	NC State	Carter–Finley Stadium • Raleigh, NC	ESPNU	**L** 31–41	56,919	
September 26	6:30 p.m.	**Troy**	Utah State	Maverik Stadium • Logan, UT	CBSSN	**L** 10–21	22,037	
September 26	7:00 p.m.	Florida Atlantic	**Louisiana–Monroe**	Malone Stadium • Monroe, LA	ESPN+	**L** 17–45	15,326	
^{#}Rankings from AP Poll released prior to game. All times are in Central Time.

=== Week 5 ===
Date	Time	Visiting team	Home team	Site	TV	Result	Attendance	Ref.
October 3	2:30 p.m.	**Old Dominion**	Georgia State	Center Parc Stadium • Atlanta, GA	ESPN+	**GSU** 42–10	17,854	
October 3	2:45 p.m.	**Marshall**	James Madison	Bridgeforth Stadium • Harrisonburg, VA	ESPNU	**JMU** 45–17	25,034	
October 3	6:00 p.m.	**Louisiana–Monroe**	South Alabama	Hancock Whitney Stadium • Mobile, AL	ESPN+	**SOAL** 52–35	12,800	
October 3	6:00 p.m.	**Georgia Southern**	Coastal Carolina	Brooks Stadium • Conway, SC	ESPN+	**GASO** 31–24	20,576	
October 3	6:30 p.m	Army	Louisiana Tech	Joe Aillet Stadium • Ruston, LA	ESPN+	**W** 31–29	18,326	
October 3	7:00 p.m.	**Arkansas State**	Louisiana	Cajun Field • Lafayette, LA	ESPN+	**ULL** 23–20	21,211	
^{#}Rankings from AP Poll released prior to game. All times are in Central Time.

=== Week 6 ===
Date	Time	Visiting team	Home team	Site	TV	Result	Attendance	Ref.
October 6	7:00 p.m.	Southern Miss	Troy	Veterans Memorial Stadium • Troy, AL	ESPN2	**TROY** 55–34	21,933	
October 8	6:30 p.m.	South Alabama	Arkansas State	Centennial Bank Stadium • Jonesboro, AR	ESPN2	**SOAL** 56–49	14,237	
October 10	12:00 p.m.	Old Dominion	Appalachian State	Kidd Brewer Stadium • Boone, NC	ESPN+	**ODU** 10–3	27,011	
October 10	6:00 p.m.	Coastal Carolina	Marshall	Joan C. Edwards Stadium • Huntington, WV	ESPN+	**CCU** 27–21	23,029	
October 10	6:30 p.m.	James Madison	Georgia Southern	Paulson Stadium • Statesboro, GA	ESPNU	**JMU** 27–24	20,545	
October 10	6:30 p.m.	Louisiana	Louisiana Tech	Joe Aillet Stadium • Ruston, LA (rivalry)	ESPN+	**LT** 32–31	20,035	
^{#}Rankings from AP Poll released prior to game. All times are in Central Time.

=== Week 7 ===
Date	Time	Visiting team	Home team	Site	TV	Result	Attendance	Ref.
October 15	6:30 p.m.	Georgia Southern	Old Dominion	S.B. Ballard Stadium • Norfolk, VA	ESPN2	**GASO** 23–15	17,912	
October 16	7:00 p.m.	Appalachian State	Coastal Carolina	Brooks Stadium • Conway, SC (rivalry)	ESPN2	**APPST** 35–32	19,485	
October 17	11:00 a.m.	Georgia State	James Madison	Bridgeforth Stadium • Harrisonburg, VA	ESPNU	**JMU** 49–22	25,225	
October 17	4:00 p.m.	Troy	Louisiana	Cajun Field • Lafayette, LA	ESPN+	**ULL** 33–6	20,623	
October 17	6:00 p.m.	Arkansas State	Southern Miss	Renasant Stadium • Hattiesburg, MS	ESPN+	**ARKST** 23–13	22,585	
October 17	7:00 p.m.	Louisiana Tech	Louisiana–Monroe	Malone Stadium • Monroe, LA (rivalry)	ESPN+	**LT** 24–0	20,653	
^{#}Rankings from AP Poll released prior to game. All times are in Central Time.

=== Week 8 ===
Date	Time	Visiting team	Home team	Site	TV	Result	Attendance	Ref.
October 20	6:30 p.m.	South Alabama	Marshall	Joan C. Edwards Stadium • Huntington, WV	ESPN2	**MRSH** 20–13	21,904	
October 22	6:00 p.m.	James Madison	Appalachian State	Kidd Brewer Stadium • Boone, NC	ESPNU	**APPST** 34–31 ^{OT}	33,322	
October 24	3:00 p.m.	Louisiana–Monroe	Troy	Veterans Memorial Stadium • Troy, AL	ESPN+	**ULM** 21–14	23,741	
October 24	4:00 p.m.	Old Dominion	Louisiana Tech	Joe Aillet Stadium • Ruston, LA	ESPN+	**LT** 26–0	20,444	
October 24	4:00 p.m.	Louisiana	Southern Miss	Renasant Stadium • Hattiesburg, MS	ESPN+	**USM** 35–31	23,244	
October 24	6:00 p.m.	Georgia State	Arkansas State	Centennial Bank Stadium • Jonesboro, AR	ESPN+	**ARKST** 38–32	17,767	
^{#}Rankings from AP Poll released prior to game. All times are in Central Time.

=== Week 9 ===
Date	Time	Visiting team	Home team	Site	TV	Result	Attendance	Ref.
October 29	6:30 p.m.	Troy	James Madison	Bridgeforth Stadium • Harrisonburg, VA	ESPN2	**TROY** 24–21 ^{OT}	25,005	
October 31	12:00 p.m.	Marshall	Old Dominion	S.B. Ballard Stadium • Norfolk, VA	ESPN+	**MRSH** 36–23	17,093	
October 31	1:00 p.m.	Coastal Carolina	Georgia State	Center Parc Stadium • Atlanta, GA	ESPN+	**CCU** 31–20	13,681	
October 31	2:00 p.m.	Louisiana Tech	South Alabama	Hancock Whitney Stadium • Mobile, AL	ESPN+	**LT** 35–20	13,078	
October 31	2:30 p.m.	Southern Miss	Louisiana–Monroe	Malone Stadium • Monroe, LA	ESPN+	**USM** 35–21	9,086	
October 31	5:30 p.m.	Appalachian State	Georgia Southern	Paulson Stadium • Statesboro, GA (rivalry)	ESPN+	**GASO** 19–3	22,832	
^{#}Rankings from AP Poll released prior to game. All times are in Central Time.

=== Week 10 ===
Date	Time	Visiting team	Home team	Site	TV	Result	Attendance	Ref.
November 5	7:00 p.m.	James Madison	Southern Miss	Renasant Stadium • Hattiesburg, MS	ESPN2	**JMU** 54–23	24,182	
November 7	12:00 p.m.	Old Dominion	Coastal Carolina	Brooks Stadium • Conway, SC	ESPN+	**ODU** 21–8	16,092	
November 7	1:30 p.m.	Georgia State	Appalachian State	Kidd Brewer Stadium • Boone, NC	ESPN+	**GSU** 39–23	31,944	
November 7	2:00 p.m.	Louisiana-Monroe	Arkansas State	Centennial Bank Stadium • Jonesboro, AR	ESPN+	**ULM** 19–17	17,185	
November 7	2:30 p.m.	Marshall	Georgia Southern	Paulson Stadium • Statesboro, GA	ESPN+	**GASO** 49–13	24,023	
November 7	3:00 p.m.	Louisiana Tech	Troy	Veterans Memorial Stadium • Troy, AL	ESPN+	**LT** 41–17	22,349	
November 7	4:00 p.m.	South Alabama	Louisiana	Cajun Field • Lafayette, LA	ESPN+	**ULL** 28–26	14,194	
^{#}Rankings from AP Poll released prior to game. All times are in Central Time.

=== Week 11 ===
Date	Time	Visiting team	Home team	Site	TV	Result	Attendance	Ref.
November 12	8:00 p.m.	Louisiana	**Louisiana–Monroe**	Malone Stadium • Monroe, LA (Battle on the Bayou)	ESPN2	**ULL** 42–21	9,002	
November 14	11:00 a.m.	James Madison	UConn	Pratt & Whitney Stadium at Rentschler Field • East Hartford, CT	CBSSN	**L** 22–46	25,530	
November 14	12:00 p.m.	Arkansas State	**Coastal Carolina**	Brooks Stadium • Conway, SC	ESPN+	**CCU** 28–21	16,785	
November 14	2:30 p.m.	Georgia Southern	**Georgia State**	Center Parc Stadium • Atlanta, GA (rivalry)	ESPN+	**GASO** 34–17	19,452	
November 14	4:00 p.m.	Southern Miss	**Louisiana Tech**	Joe Aillet Stadium • Ruston, LA (Rivalry in Dixie)	ESPN+	**LT** 63–31	15,423	
November 14	5:00 p.m.	Appalachian State	**Marshall**	Joan C. Edwards Stadium • Huntington, WV (rivalry)	ESPN+	**APPST** 20–16	23,675	
November 14	6:00 p.m.	Troy	**South Alabama**	Hancock Whitney Stadium • Mobile, AL (rivalry)	ESPN+	**SOAL** 27–14	22,269	
^{#}Rankings from AP Poll released prior to game. All times are in Central Time.

=== Week 12 ===
Date	Time	Visiting team	Home team	Site	TV	Result	Attendance	Ref.
November 21	1:30 p.m.	Louisiana–Monroe	**Appalachian State**	Kidd Brewer Stadium • Boone, NC	ESPN+	**APPST** 17–16 ^{OT}	28,624	
November 21	2:00 p.m.	Coastal Carolina	**Louisiana**	Cajun Field • Lafayette, LA	ESPN+	**ULL** 38–24	19,367	
November 21	2:30 p.m.	Old Dominion	UConn	Pratt & Whitney Stadium at Rentschler Field • East Hartford, CT	CBSSN	**L** 21–29	27,006	
November 21	3:00 p.m.	Georgia Southern	**Troy**	Veterans Memorial Stadium • Troy, AL	EPSN+	**GASO** 45–7	18,977	
November 21	3:00 p.m.	Georgia State	**Marshall**	Joan C. Edwards Stadium • Huntington, WV	ESPN+	**MRSH** 28–27	24,560	
November 21	3:00 p.m.	South Alabama	**Southern Miss**	Renasant Stadium • Hattiesburg, MS	ESPN+	**SOAL** 40–35	27,608	
November 21	6:00 p.m.	Arkansas State	**Louisiana Tech**	Joe Aillet Stadium • Ruston, LA	ESPN+	**LT** 48–3	15,316	
^{#}Rankings from AP Poll released prior to game. All times are in Central Time.

=== Week 13 ===
Date	Time	Visiting team	Home team	Site	TV	Result	Attendance	Ref.
November 27	2:00 p.m.	Appalachian State	South Alabama	Hancock Whitney Stadium • Mobile, AL	ESPN+			
November 28		Coastal Carolina	James Madison	Bridgeforth Stadium • Harrisonburg, VA				
November 28		Louisiana Tech	Georgia Southern	Paulson Stadium • Statesboro, GA				
November 28		Louisiana	Georgia State	Center Parc Stadium • Atlanta, GA				
November 28		Marshall	Louisiana–Monroe	Malone Stadium • Monroe, LA				
November 28		Southern Miss	Old Dominion	S.B. Ballard Stadium • Norfolk, VA				
November 28		Troy	Arkansas State	Centennial Bank Stadium • Jonesboro, AR				
^{#}Rankings from AP Poll released prior to game. All times are in Central Time.

=== Week 14 - Conference championship ===
Date	Time	Visiting team	Home team	Site	TV	Result	Attendance	Ref.
December 4		East division winner	Louisiana Tech	TBD • TBD				
^{#}Rankings from AP Poll released prior to game. All times are in Central Time.

== Sun Belt records vs. other conferences ==
2026–2027 records against non-conference foes, including bowl games:

Regular season

Power Four Conferences	Record
ACC	0–3
Big 12	0–5
Big Ten	0–2
Notre Dame	0–0
SEC	0–5
Power 5 Total	0–16
Other FBS Conferences	Record
American	5–6
CUSA	6–2
Independents (Excluding Notre Dame)	0–1
MAC	1–0
Mountain West	1–0
Pac-12	1–1
Other FBS Total	14–10
FCS Opponents	Record
Football Championship Subdivision	12–1
Total Non-Conference Record	26–27

=== Sun Belt vs Power 4 matchups ===
This is a list of games the Sun Belt has scheduled versus power conference teams (ACC, Big Ten, Big 12, Notre Dame and SEC). All rankings are from the current AP Poll at the time of the game.

Date	Conference	Visitor	Home	Site	Score
September 5	Big 12	Coastal Carolina	West Virginia	Milan Puskar Stadium • Morgantown, WV	L 24–31
September 5	Big Ten	Marshall	No. 18 Penn State	Beaver Stadium • University Park, PA	L 0–45
September 5	SEC	Louisiana–Monroe	Mississippi State	Davis Wade Stadium • Starkville, MS	L 13–62
September 12	ACC	Old Dominion	Virginia Tech	Lane Stadium • Blacksburg, VA	L 21–44
September 12	SEC	Louisiana Tech	No. 9 LSU	Tiger Stadium • Baton Rouge, LA	L 14–45
September 12	ACC	Georgia Southern	Clemson	Memorial Stadium • Clemson, SC	L 7–22
September 12	SEC	Southern Miss	Auburn	Jordan–Hare Stadium • Auburn, AL	L 8–43
September 12	Big Ten	Louisiana	No. 14 USC	Los Angeles Memorial Coliseum • Los Angeles, CA	L 30–49
September 19	SEC	Troy	No. 20 Missouri	Faurot Field • Columbia, MO	L 17–27
September 19	Big 12	Louisiana Tech	Baylor	McLane Stadium • Waco, TX	L 19–36
September 19	Big 12	Georgia State	UCF	Acrisure Bounce House • Orlando, FL	L 30–44
September 19	Big 12	Arkansas State	TCU	Amon G. Carter Stadium • Fort Worth, TX	L 7–31
September 26	Big 12	No. 25 Houston	Georgia Southern	Paulson Stadium • Statesboro, GA	L 28–42
September 26	ACC	Appalachian State	NC State	Carter–Finley Stadium • Raleigh, NC	L 31–41
September 26	SEC	South Alabama	Kentucky	Kroger Field • Lexington, KY	L 21–45

=== Sun Belt vs other FBS matchups ===
The following games include Sun Belt teams competing against teams from the American, C-USA, MAC, Mountain West, or Pac-12.

Date	Conference	Visitor	Home	Site	Score
September 5	C-USA	Liberty	James Madison	Bridgeforth Stadium • Harrisonburg, VA	W 20–13
September 5	American	Arkansas State	Memphis	Simmons Bank Liberty Stadium • Memphis, TN	L 24–42
September 5	C-USA	Sam Houston	Troy	Veterans Memorial Stadium • Troy, AL	W 24–21
September 12	American	Appalachian State	East Carolina	Dowdy–Ficklen Stadium • Greenville, NC	W 27–24
September 12	American	Louisiana–Monroe	UAB	Protective Stadium • Birmingham, AL	L 20–26
September 12	American	South Alabama	Tulane	Yulman Stadium • New Orleans, LA	L 24–28
September 12	C-USA	Georgia State	Kennesaw State	Fifth Third Stadium • Kennesaw, GA	W 31–17
September 12	C-USA	Middle Tennessee	Marshall	Joan C. Edwards Stadium • Huntington, WV	W 28–26
September 19	C-USA	Coastal Carolina	Delaware	Delaware Stadium • Newark, DE	L 14–22
September 19	American	East Carolina	Old Dominion	S.B. Ballard Stadium • Norfolk, VA	L 17–20
September 19	American	Charlotte	Appalachian State	Kidd Brewer Stadium • Boone, NC	W 26–21
September 19	C-USA	Marshall	Missouri State	Robert W. Plaster Stadium • Springfield, MO	W 30–24
September 19	MAC	Ohio	South Alabama	Hancock Whitney Stadium • Mobile, AL	W 41–35
September 19	C-USA	Georgia Southern	Jacksonville State	AmFirst Stadium • Jacksonville, AL	L 27–31
September 19	American	UAB	Louisiana	Cajun Field • Lafayette, LA	W 21–14
September 19	Pac-12	James Madison	San Diego State	Snapdragon Stadium • San Diego, CA	W 26–13
September 24	C-USA	Liberty	Coastal Carolina	Brooks Stadium • Conway, SC	
September 26	American	Louisiana	Charlotte	Jerry Richardson Stadium • Charlotte, NC	W 34–7
September 26	American	Florida Atlantic	Louisiana–Monroe	Malone Stadium • Monroe, LA	L 17–45
September 26	American	Southern Miss	Tulane	Yulman Stadium • New Orleans, LA	L 21–24
September 26	Mountain West	Northern Illinois	Georgia State	Center Parc Stadium • Atlanta, GA	W 35–14
September 26	C-USA	Kennesaw State	Arkansas State	Centennial Bank Stadium • Jonesboro, AR	W 17–14
September 26	Pac-12	Troy	Utah State	Maverik Stadium • Logan, UT	L 10–21
October 3	American	Army	Louisiana Tech	Joe Aillet Stadium • Ruston, LA	W 31–29

=== Sun Belt vs FBS independents matchups ===
The following regular season games include Sun Belt teams competing against FBS Independents, which only includes UConn for 2026.

Date	Visitor	Home	Site	Score
September 19	UConn	Southern Miss	Renasant Stadium • Hattiesburg, MS	L 20–48
November 14	James Madison	UConn	Pratt & Whitney Stadium at Rentschler Field • East Hartford, CT	
November 21	Old Dominion	UConn	Pratt & Whitney Stadium at Rentschler Field • East Hartford, CT	

=== Sun Belt vs. FCS matchups ===
The following games include Sun Belt teams competing against FCS schools.

Date	Visitor	Home	Site	Score
September 4	North Carolina A&T	Georgia State	Center Parc Stadium • Atlanta, GA	W 59–10
September 5	Maine	Appalachian State	Kidd Brewer Stadium • Boone, NC	W 55–3
September 5	Alcorn State	Southern Miss	Renasant Stadium • Hattiesburg, MS	W 49–3
September 5	Norfolk State	Old Dominion	S.B. Ballard Stadium • Norfolk, VA	W 31–10
September 5	Charleston Southern	Georgia Southern	Paulson Stadium • Statesboro, GA	W 31–0
September 5	Southeastern Louisiana	South Alabama	Hancock Whitney Stadium • Mobile, AL	W 39–14
September 5	Northwestern State	Louisiana Tech	Joe Aillet Stadium • Ruston, LA	W 80–6
September 5	Lamar	Louisiana	Cajun Field • Lafayette, LA	W 38–7
September 12	Wagner	James Madison	Bridgeforth Stadium • Harrisonburg, VA	W 87–3
September 12	Alabama State	Troy	Veterans Memorial Stadium • Troy, AL	W 34–17
September 12	West Georgia	Arkansas State	Centennial Bank Stadium • Jonesboro, AR	W 52–7
September 12	Fordham	Coastal Carolina	Brooks Stadium • Conway, SC	W 45–7
September 19	Southeastern Louisiana	Louisiana–Monroe	Malone Stadium • Monroe, LA	L 35–38
September 26	Gardner–Webb	Marshall	Joan C. Edwards Stadium • Huntington, WV	W 36–35

== Awards and honors ==
=== Player of the week honors ===
Week	Offensive			Defensive			Special Teams		
Week	Player	Team	Position	Player	Team	Position	Player	Team	Position
Week 1	Deuce Bailey	Coastal Carolina	QB	Kobi Albert	Southern Miss	DB	Dedrick Latulas	Louisiana Tech	RS
Week 2	Cameran Brown	Georgia State	QB	Robert Stevens III	Arkansas State	LB	Michael Scott	James Madison	RS
Week 3	Malachi Singleton	Appalachian State	QB	Collin Jacob	Louisiana	DB	Patrick Rea	James Madison	P
Week 4	Camden Coleman	James Madison	QB	Brent Gordon Jr.	Louisiana	DB	Isaiah Stone	Georgia State	RS
Week 5	Cameran Brown (2)	Georgia State	QB	Xavier Esqillion	Georgia State	LB	Tony Sterner	Louisiana	RS
Week 6	Blake Baker	Louisiana Tech	QB	Javen Gibson	Old Dominion	DL	Keenan Phillips	South Alabama	RS
Week 7	Jaquari Lewis	Appalachian State	RB	Anthony Bynum	Georgia Southern	LB	Tripp Bryant	Georgia Southern	K
Week 8	Trey Owens	Arkansas State	QB	Colton Phares	Appalachian State	LB	James London	Appalachian State	K
Week 9	Steven Robinson	Southern Miss	RB	Justin Powe	Troy	DB	Tripp Bryant (2)	Georgia Southern	K
