= 2026 Coastal Carolina Chanticleers football team =

American college football season

2026 Coastal Carolina Chanticleers football
- Conference: Sun Belt Conference
- East Division
- Record: 4–7 (3–4 Sun Belt)
- Head coach: Ryan Beard (1st season)
- Offensive coordinator: Nick Petrino (1st season)
- Defensive coordinator: L. D. Scott (1st season)
- Home stadium: Brooks Stadium

2026 Sun Belt Conference football standings
	Conf.			Overall
Team	W		L	W		L
East Division
Georgia Southern	6	–	1	7	–	4
James Madison	5	–	2	8	–	3
Appalachian State	4	–	3	7	–	4
Coastal Carolina	3	–	4	4	–	7
Marshall	3	–	4	6	–	5
Georgia State	2	–	5	5	–	6
Old Dominion	2	–	5	3	–	8
West Division
Louisiana Tech xy	7	–	0	9	–	2
Louisiana	5	–	2	8	–	3
South Alabama	4	–	3	6	–	5
Arkansas State	2	–	5	4	–	7
Troy	2	–	5	4	–	7
Southern Miss	2	–	5	3	–	8
Louisiana–Monroe	2	–	5	2	–	9
Championship: TBD vs. Louisiana Tech
$ – Conference champion; x – Division champion/co-champions; y – Championship game participant; As of November 22, 2026; Rankings from AP poll

The 2026 Coastal Carolina Chanticleers football team represents Coastal Carolina University in the Sun Belt Conference's East Division during the 2026 NCAA Division I FBS football season. Led by first-year head coach Ryan Beard, the Chanticleers play their home games at Brooks Stadium, located in Conway, South Carolina.

== Offseason ==
=== Coaching staff additions ===
Name	New Position	Previous Team	Previous Position	Source
Nick Petrino	Offensive Coordinator	Missouri State	Offensive Coordinator	
L.D. Scott	Defensive Coordinator	Missouri State	Defensive Coordinator	
Nelson Fishback	Special Teams Coordinator	New Mexico State	Special Teams Coordinator	
Everette Sands	Running Backs Coach	UTSA	Running Backs	

== Preseason ==
=== Media poll ===
In the Sun Belt preseason coaches' poll, the Chanticleers were picked to finish fifth place in the East division.

Defensive back Ja'Marion Wayne was named to the Preseason All-Sun Belt first team defense. Linebacker Tray Brown and defensive back Myles Woods were named to the second team defense.

== Schedule ==
Date	Time	Opponent	Site	TV	Result	Attendance
September 5	12:00 p.m.	at West Virginia*	Milan Puskar Stadium; Morgantown, WV	TNT/TruTV	L 24–31	54,158
September 12	7:30 p.m.	Fordham*	Brooks Stadium; Conway, SC	ESPN+	W 45–7	22,273
September 19	11:30 a.m.	at Delaware*	Delaware Stadium; Newark, DE	CBSSN	L 14–22	17,937
September 24	7:30 p.m.	Liberty*	Brooks Stadium; Conway, SC (rivalry)	ESPN	L 17–34	22,116
October 3	7:00 p.m.	Georgia Southern	Brooks Stadium; Conway, SC	ESPN+	L 24–31	20,576
October 10	7:00 p.m.	at Marshall	Joan C. Edwards Stadium; Huntington, WV	ESPN+	W 27–21	23,029
October 16	8:00 p.m.	Appalachian State	Brooks Stadium; Conway, SC (rivalry)	ESPN2	L 32–35	19,485
October 31	2:00 p.m.	at Georgia State	Center Parc Stadium; Atlanta, GA	ESPN+	W 31–20	13,681
November 7	1:00 p.m.	Old Dominion^{†}	Brooks Stadium; Conway, SC	ESPN+	L 8–21	16,092
November 14	1:00 p.m.	Arkansas State	Brooks Stadium; Conway, SC	ESPN+	W 28–21	16,785
November 21	3:00 p.m.	at Louisiana	Cajun Field; Lafayette, LA	ESPN+	L 24–38	19,367
November 28	2:00 p.m.	at James Madison	Bridgeforth Stadium; Harrisonburg, VA	ESPN+		
*Non-conference game; ^{†}Homecoming; All times are in Eastern time

== Game summaries ==
=== at West Virginia ===
Coastal Carolina Chanticleers (0–0) at West Virginia Mountaineers (0–0) – Game summary

Quarter	1	2	3	4	Total
Chanticleers	0	0	7	17	24
Mountaineers	14	10	0	7	31

at Milan Puskar Stadium • Morgantown, West Virginia

- Date: September 5
- Game time: 12:00 p.m. EDT
- Game weather: Cloudy • Temperature: 72 °F (22 °C) • Wind: SW 1 mph
- Game attendance: 54,158
- Referee: Luke Richmond
- TV announcers (TNT): J.B. Long (play-by-play), Mike Golic Jr. (analyst), and Coy Wire (sideline reporter)

Game information

First quarter

- WVU – Cam Cook 3-yard run (Jack Cassidy kick), 14:13. Mountaineers 7–0. Drive: 2 plays, 75 yards, 0:47.
- WVU – Armoni Weaver-Bomar 49-yard pass from Michael Hawkins Jr. (Jack Cassidy kick), 2:14. Mountaineers 14–0. Drive: 9 plays, 92 yards, 3:33.

Second quarter

- WVU – Jack Cassidy 38-yard field goal, 13:51. Mountaineers 17–0. Drive: 7 plays, 21 yards, 2:22.
- WVU – Cam Cook 1-yard run (Jack Cassidy kick), 1:18. Mountaineers 24–0. Drive: 17 plays, 86 yards, 6:35.

Third quarter

- CCU – Clayton Coppock Jr. 34-yard pass from Deuce Bailey (Nico Cavanillas Alti kick), 3:57. Mountaineers 24–7. Drive: 12 plays, 99 yards, 7:13.

Fourth quarter

- CCU – Colton Hinton 13-yard pass from Deuce Bailey (Nico Cavanillas Alti kick), 12:56. Mountaineers 24–14. Drive: 3 plays, 71 yards, 0:33.
- WVU – Michael Hawkins Jr. 11-yard run (Jack Cassidy kick), 2:58. Mountaineers 31–14. Drive: 5 plays, 75 yards, 3:00.
- CCU – Clayton Coppock Jr. 37-yard pass from Deuce Bailey (Nico Cavanillas Alti kick), 1:51. Mountaineers 31–21. Drive: 5 plays, 35 yards, 1:07.
- CCU – Nico Cavanillas Alti 32-yard field goal, 0:27. Mountaineers 31–24. Drive: 6 plays, 65 yards, 1:07.

Statistics	CCU	WVU
First downs	22	18
Plays–yards	64-425	75-413
Rushes–yards	27–52	61–281
Passing yards	373	132
Passing: comp–att–int	21-37-0	11-14-0
Turnovers	2	1
Time of possession	27:04	32:56

Team	Category	Player	Statistics
Coastal Carolina	Passing	Deuce Bailey	21/37, 373 yards, 3 TD
Coastal Carolina	Rushing	Jevon Edwards	10 carries, 20 yards
Coastal Carolina	Receiving	Clayton Coppock Jr.	4 receptions, 83 yards, 2 TD
West Virginia	Passing	Michael Hawkins Jr.	11/14, 132 yards, TD
West Virginia	Rushing	Cam Cook	30 carries, 142 yards, 2 TD
West Virginia	Receiving	Armoni Weaver-Bomar	1 reception, 49 yards, TD

=== Fordham (FCS) ===
Fordham Rams (FCS) (0–2) at Coastal Carolina Chanticleers (0–1) – Game summary

Quarter	1	2	3	4	Total
Rams (FCS)	0	7	0	0	7
Chanticleers	7	21	10	7	45

at Brooks Stadium • Conway, South Carolina

- Date: September 12
- Game time: 7:30 p.m. EDT
- Game weather: Sunny • Temperature: 82 °F (28 °C) • Wind: N 8 mph
- Game attendance: 18,113
- Referee: Chris Brison
- TV announcers (ESPN+): Dom Izzo (play-by-play) and Kyle Emanuel (analyst)

Game information

First quarter

- CCU – Dominic Lee-Knicely 5-yard run (Nico Cavanillas Alti kick), 10:09. Chanticleers 7–0. Drive: 10 plays, 75 yards, 4:51.

Second quarter

- FORD – Nodin Tracy 6-yard pass from Gunnar Smith (Bennett Henderson kick), 13:09. Tied 7–7. Drive: 9 plays, 51 yards, 4:58.
- CCU – Colton Hinton 65-yard pass from Deuce Bailey (Nico Cavanillas Alti kick), 11:11. Chanticleers 14–7. Drive: 4 plays, 78 yards, 1:53.
- CCU – Robby Washington 23-yard pass from Deuce Bailey (Nico Cavanillas Alti kick), 5:01. Chanticleers 21–7. Drive: 3 plays, 36 yards, 1:25.
- CCU – Clayton Coppock Jr. 12-yard pass from Deuce Bailey (Nico Cavanillas Alti kick), 0:39. Chanticleers 28–7. Drive: 2 plays, 16 yards, 0:08.

Third quarter

- CCU – Dominic Lee-Knicely 18-yard run (Nico Cavanillas Alti kick), 9:15. Chanticleers 35–7. Drive: 9 plays, 81 yards, 3:31.
- CCU – Nico Cavanillas Alti 56-yard field goal, 0:15. Chanticleers 38–7. Drive: 6 plays, 21 yards, 2:02.

Fourth quarter

- CCU – Jaden Allen-Hendrix 5-yard run (Nico Cavanillas Alti kick), 10:57. Chanticleers 45–7. Drive: 5 plays, 32 yards, 2:47.

Statistics	FOR	CCU
First downs	11	23
Plays–yards	54–215	69–460
Rushes–yards	33–114	41–251
Passing yards	101	209
Passing: Comp–Att–Int	9–21–3	13–28–0
Turnovers	4	0
Time of possession	30:05	29:55

Team	Category	Player	Statistics
Fordham	Passing	Gunnar Smith	9/20, 101 yards, TD, 2 INT
Fordham	Rushing	Gunnar Smith	11 carries, 40 yards
Fordham	Receiving	Nodin Tracy	4 receptions, 56 yards, TD
Coastal Carolina	Passing	Deuce Bailey	12/25, 203 yards, 3 TD
Coastal Carolina	Rushing	Jaden Allen-Hendrix	7 carries, 58 yards, TD
Coastal Carolina	Receiving	Colton Hinton	3 receptions, 101 yards, TD

=== at Delaware ===
Coastal Carolina Chanticleers (1–1) at Delaware Fightin' Blue Hens (1–1) – Game summary

Quarter	1	2	3	4	Total
Chanticleers	7	7	0	0	14
Fightin' Blue Hens	0	15	0	7	22

at Delaware Stadium • Newark, Delaware

- Date: September 19
- Game time: 11:30 a.m. EDT
- Game weather: Sunny
- Game attendance: 17,937
- Referee: Ron Hudson
- TV announcers (CBSSN): Alex Barrio (play-by-play) and Doug Pederson (analyst)

Game information

First quarter

- CCU – Goldie Lawrence 62-yard pass from Deuce Bailey (Nico Cavanillas Alti kick), 7:51. Chanticleers 7–0. Drive: 5 plays, 95 yards, 2:19.

Second quarter

- DEL – Sean Wilson 40-yard pass from Nick Minicucci (Tucker Smack kick), 12:38. Tied 7–7. Drive: 5 plays, 70 yards, 2:14.
- CCU – Colton Hinton 27-yard pass from Deuce Bailey (Nico Cavanillas Alti kick), 8:19. Chanticleers 14–7. Drive: 9 plays, 72 yards, 4:13.
- DEL – Jo Silver 2-yard run (Nick Minicucci two-point conversion run), 0:35. Fighting Blue Hens 15–14. Drive: 6 plays, 60 yards, 1:11.

Fourth quarter

- DEL – Sean Wilson 36-yard pass from Nick Minicucci (Tucker Smack kick), 8:19. Fighting Blue Hens 22–14. Drive: 1 play, 36 yards, 0:08.

Statistics	CCU	DEL
First downs	21	22
Total yards	385	395
Rushing yards	135	93
Passing yards	250	302
Passing: Comp–Att–Int	16-26-0	24-32-0
Time of possession	27:52	32:08

Team	Category	Player	Statistics
Coastal Carolina	Passing	Deuce Bailey	16/26, 250 yards, 2 TDs
Coastal Carolina	Rushing	Jevon Edwards	14 carries, 49 yards
Coastal Carolina	Receiving	Goldie Lawrence	1 reception, 62 yards, TD
Delaware	Passing	Nick Minicucci	24/32, 302 yards, 2 TDs
Delaware	Rushing	Viron Ellison Jr.	6 carries, 30 yards
Delaware	Receiving	Sean Wilson	9 receptions, 185 yards, 2 TDs

=== Liberty (rivalry) ===
Liberty Flames (2–1) at Coastal Carolina Chanticleers (1–2) – Game summary

Quarter	1	2	3	4	Total
Flames	10	0	0	14	24
Chanticleers	3	14	0	0	17

at Brooks Stadium • Conway, South Carolina

- Date: September 24
- Game time: 7:30 p.m. EDT
- Game weather: Cloudy • Temperature: 65 °F (18 °C) • Wind: S 12 MPH
- Game attendance: 22,116
- Referee: Jeremee Tate
- TV announcers (ESPN): Matt Barrie (play-by-play), Chase Daniel (analyst) and Paul Carcaterra (sideline reporter)

Game information

First Quarter

- (9:43) LIB – Chase Reeves 29-yard field goal (Drive: 7 plays, 69 yards, 3:17; Flames 3–0)
- (5:19) CCU – Nico Cavanillas Alti 41-yard field goal (Drive: 13 plays, 52 yards, 4:24; Tied 3–3)
- (3:13) LIB – Makai Jackson 58-yard pass from Deshawn Purdie, Chase Reeves kick (Drive: 5 plays, 75 yards, 2:06; Flames 10–3)

Second Quarter

- (5:26) CCU – Colton Hinton 24-yard pass from Deuce Bailey, Nico Cavanillas Alti kick (Drive: 9 plays, 73 yards, 4:03; Tied 10–10)
- (0:24) CCU – Tristian Gardner 39-yard pass from Deuce Bailey, Nico Cavanillas Alti kick (Drive: 8 plays, 80 yards, 1:08; Chanticleers 17–10)

Third Quarter

- (13:10) LIB – Makai Jackson 33-yard pass from Deshawn Purdie, Chase Reeves kick (Drive: 4 plays, 77 yards, 1:44; Tied 17–17)
- (4:52) LIB – Chase Reeves 24-yard field goal (Drive: 10 plays, 65 yards, 5:56; Flames 20–17)

Fourth Quarter

- (12:06) LIB – Ethan Vasko 8-yard run, Chase Reeves kick (Drive: 8 plays, 45 yards, 4:51; Flames 27–17)
- (1:02) LIB – Kam Davis 6-yard run from Ethan Vasko, Tyler Black kick (Drive: 3 plays, 20 yards, 0:57; Flames 34–17)

Statistics	LIB	CCU
First downs	24	18
Total yards	485	292
Rushing yards	263	79
Passing yards	222	213
Passing: Comp–Att–Int	12–18–0	17–35–2
Turnovers	2	2
Time of possession	32:41	27:19

Team	Category	Player	Statistics
Liberty	Passing	Deshawn Purdie	11/16, 216 yards, 2 TD
Liberty	Rushing	Kam Davis	18 carries, 166 yards
Liberty	Receiving	Makai Jackson	5 receptions, 149 yards, 2 TD
Coastal Carolina	Passing	Deuce Bailey	17/34, 213 yards, 2 TD, 2 INT
Coastal Carolina	Rushing	Deuce Bailey	15 carries, 31 yards
Coastal Carolina	Receiving	Tristian Gardner	4 receptions, 86 yards, TD

=== Georgia Southern ===
Georgia Southern Eagles (1–3) at Coastal Carolina Chanticleers (1–3) – Game summary

Quarter	1	2	Total
Eagles			0
Chanticleers			0

at Brooks Stadium • Conway, South Carolina

- Date: October 3
- Game time: 7:00 p.m. EDT
- Game attendance: 20,576
- TV: ESPN+

Game information

First Quarter

Second Quarter

Third Quarter

Fourth Quarter

Statistics	GASO	CCU
First downs		
Total yards		
Rushing yards		
Passing yards		
Passing: Comp–Att–Int		
Time of possession		

Team	Category	Player	Statistics
Georgia Southern	Passing		
Georgia Southern	Rushing		
Georgia Southern	Receiving		
Coastal Carolina	Passing		
Coastal Carolina	Rushing		
Coastal Carolina	Receiving		

=== at Marshall ===
Coastal Carolina Chanticleers (1–4) at Marshall Thundering Herd (3–2) – Game summary

Quarter	1	2	3	4	Total
Chanticleers	3	10	14	0	27
Thundering Herd	0	0	7	14	21

at Joan C. Edwards Stadium • Huntington, West Virginia

- Date: October 10
- Game time: 7:00 p.m. EDT
- Game weather: Sunny
- Game attendance: 23,029
- Referee: Brandon Kirkland
- TV announcers (ESPN+): Keith Morehouse (play-by-play), Mark Martin (analyst), and Ben Westfall (sideline)

Game information

First quarter

- (8:58) CCU – Nico Cavanillas Alti 26 yard field goal (Drive: 4 plays, 1 yard, 1:59; Coastal Carolina 3–0)

Second quarter

- (12:31) CCU – Karmello English 7 yard pass from Deuce Bailey, Mitch Weisenborn kick (Drive: 4 plays, 40 yards, 1:49; Coastal Carolina 10–0)
- (3:33) CCU – Nico Cavanillas Alti 40 yard field goal(Drive: 10 plays, 58 yards, 5:06; Coastal Carolina 13–0)

Third quarter

- (14:42) CCU – Dominic Lee-Knicely 70 yard run, Mitch Weisenborn kick (Drive: 1 play, 70 yards, 0:12; Coastal Carolina 20–0)
- (11:47) CCU – Jaden Allen-Hendrix 2 yard run, Mitch Weisenborn kick (Drive: 7 plays, 28 yards, 2:55; Coastal Carolina 27–0)
- (2:46) MRSH – Judah Price 50 yard run, Jorge Diaz Nicolas kick (Drive: 4 plays, 87 yards, 1:24; Coastal Carolina 27–7)

Fourth quarter

- (2:52) MRSH – Judah Price 9 yard pass from Zion Turner, Jorge Diaz Nicolas kick (Drive: 4 plays, 34 yards, 1:10; Coastal Carolina 27–14)
- (2:14) MRSH – Owen Sweeney 19 yard pass from Zion Turner, Jorge Diaz Nicolas kick (Drive: 3 plays, 50 yards, 0:34; Coastal Carolina 27–21)

Statistics	CCU	MRSH
First downs	16	25
Total yards	308	505
Rushing yards	235	221
Passing yards	73	284
Passing: Comp–Att–Int	8–18–1	21–37–3
Time of possession	30:51	29:09

Team	Category	Player	Statistics
Coastal Carolina	Passing	Deuce Bailey	8/18, 73 yards, INT
Coastal Carolina	Rushing	Dominic Lee-Knicely	25 carries, 169 yards, TD
Coastal Carolina	Receiving	Dominic Lee-Knicely	3 receptions, 42 yards
Marshall	Passing	Zion Turner	18/27, 219 yards, 2 TD
Marshall	Rushing	Judah Price	12 carries, 124 yards, TD
Marshall	Receiving	Adrian Norton	4 receptions, 77 yards

=== Appalachian State (rivalry) ===
Appalachian State Mountaineers (3–2) at Coastal Carolina Chanticleers (2–4) – Game summary

Quarter	1	2	3	4	Total
Mountaineers	14	0	14	7	35
Chanticleers	7	17	0	8	32

at Brooks Stadium • Conway, South Carolina

- Date: October 16
- Game time: 8:00 p.m. EDT
- Game attendance: 19,485
- TV: ESPN2

Game information

First Quarter

Second Quarter

Third Quarter

Fourth Quarter

Statistics	APP	CCU
First downs		
Total yards		
Rushing yards		
Passing yards		
Passing: Comp–Att–Int		
Time of possession		

Team	Category	Player	Statistics
Appalachian State	Passing		
Appalachian State	Rushing		
Appalachian State	Receiving		
Coastal Carolina	Passing		
Coastal Carolina	Rushing		
Coastal Carolina	Receiving		

=== at Georgia State ===
Coastal Carolina Chanticleers (2–5) at Georgia State Panthers (4–3) – Game summary

Quarter	1	2	Total
Chanticleers			0
Panthers			0

at Center Parc Stadium • Atlanta, Georgia

- Date: October 31
- Game time: 2:00 p.m. EDT
- Game attendance: 13,681
- TV: ESPN+

Game information

First quarter

Second quarter

Third quarter

Fourth quarter

Statistics	CCU	GAST
First downs		
Total yards		
Rushing yards		
Passing yards		
Passing: Comp–Att–Int		
Turnovers		
Time of possession		

Team	Category	Player	Statistics
Coastal Carolina	Passing		
Coastal Carolina	Rushing		
Coastal Carolina	Receiving		
Georgia State	Passing		
Georgia State	Rushing		
Georgia State	Receiving		

=== Old Dominion ===
Old Dominion Monarchs (2–7) at Coastal Carolina Chanticleers (3–5) – Game summary

Quarter	1	2	Total
Monarchs			0
Chanticleers			0

at Brooks Stadium • Conway, South Carolina

- Date: November 7
- Game time: 1:00 p.m. EDT
- Game attendance: 16,092
- TV: ESPN+

Game information

First Quarter

Second Quarter

Third Quarter

Fourth Quarter

Statistics	ODU	CCU
First downs		
Total yards		
Rushing yards		
Passing yards		
Passing: Comp–Att–Int		
Time of possession		

Team	Category	Player	Statistics
Old Dominion	Passing		
Old Dominion	Rushing		
Old Dominion	Receiving		
Coastal Carolina	Passing		
Coastal Carolina	Rushing		
Coastal Carolina	Receiving		

=== Arkansas State ===
Arkansas State Red Wolves (4–5) at Coastal Carolina Chanticleers (3–6) – Game summary

Quarter	1	2	Total
Red Wolves			0
Chanticleers			0

at Brooks Stadium • Conway, South Carolina

- Date: November 14
- Game time: 1:00 p.m. EDT
- Game attendance: 16,785
- TV: ESPN+

Game information

First Quarter

Second Quarter

Third Quarter

Fourth Quarter

Statistics	ARST	CCU
First downs		
Total yards		
Rushing yards		
Passing yards		
Passing: Comp–Att–Int		
Time of possession		

Team	Category	Player	Statistics
Arkansas State	Passing		
Arkansas State	Rushing		
Arkansas State	Receiving		
Coastal Carolina	Passing		
Coastal Carolina	Rushing		
Coastal Carolina	Receiving		

=== at Louisiana ===
Coastal Carolina Chanticleers (4–6) at Louisiana Ragin' Cajuns (7–3) – Game summary

Quarter	1	2	Total
Chanticleers			0
Ragin' Cajuns			0

at Cajun Field • Lafayette, Louisiana

- Date: November 21
- Game time: 3:00 p.m. EDT
- TV: ESPN+

Game information

First quarter

Second quarter

Third quarter

Fourth quarter

Statistics	CCU	LA
First downs		
Total yards		
Rushing yards		
Passing yards		
Passing: Comp–Att–Int		
Time of possession		

Team	Category	Player	Statistics
Coastal Carolina	Passing		
Coastal Carolina	Rushing		
Coastal Carolina	Receiving		
Louisiana	Passing		
Louisiana	Rushing		
Louisiana	Receiving		

=== at James Madison ===
Coastal Carolina Chanticleers (0–0) at James Madison Dukes (8–3) – Game summary

Quarter	1	2	Total
Chanticleers			0
Dukes			0

at Bridgeforth Stadium • Harrisonburg, Virginia

- Date: November 28
- Game time: 2:00 p.m. EDT
- TV: ESPN+

Game information

First quarter

Second quarter

Third quarter

Fourth quarter

Statistics	CCU	JMU
First downs		
Total yards		
Rushing yards		
Passing yards		
Passing: Comp–Att–Int		
Time of possession		

Team	Category	Player	Statistics
Coastal Carolina	Passing		
Coastal Carolina	Rushing		
Coastal Carolina	Receiving		
James Madison	Passing		
James Madison	Rushing		
James Madison	Receiving		
