= 2026 Louisiana Tech Bulldogs football team =

American college football season

2026 Louisiana Tech Bulldogs football

Sun Belt West Division champion
- Conference: Sun Belt Conference
- Record: 9–2 (7–0 Sun Belt)
- Head coach: Sonny Cumbie (5th season)
- Offensive coordinator: Nathan Young (1st season)
- Offensive scheme: Spread
- Defensive coordinator: Luke Olson (2nd season)
- Base defense: 3–3–5
- Home stadium: Joe Aillet Stadium

2026 Sun Belt Conference football standings
	Conf.			Overall
Team	W		L	W		L
East Division
Georgia Southern	6	–	1	7	–	4
James Madison	5	–	2	8	–	3
Appalachian State	4	–	3	7	–	4
Coastal Carolina	3	–	4	4	–	7
Marshall	3	–	4	6	–	5
Georgia State	2	–	5	5	–	6
Old Dominion	2	–	5	3	–	8
West Division
Louisiana Tech xy	7	–	0	9	–	2
Louisiana	5	–	2	8	–	3
South Alabama	4	–	3	6	–	5
Arkansas State	2	–	5	4	–	7
Troy	2	–	5	4	–	7
Southern Miss	2	–	5	3	–	8
Louisiana–Monroe	2	–	5	2	–	9
Championship: TBD vs. Louisiana Tech
$ – Conference champion; x – Division champion/co-champions; y – Championship game participant; As of November 22, 2026; Rankings from AP poll

The 2026 Louisiana Tech Bulldogs football team represents Louisiana Tech University (LT) during the 2026 NCAA Division I FBS football season as a first-year member of the Sun Belt Conference. The Bulldogs are led by fifth-year head coach Sonny Cumbie and play home games at Joe Aillet Stadium in Ruston, Louisiana.

The Bulldogs won their first conference division since 2019 with a 63-31 win over the Southern Miss Golden Eagles, their first as a member of the Sun Belt Conference. They will play for the Sun Belt Conference Championship on December 4, vying for their first conference championship since 2011, when they were members of the Western Athletic Conference.

== Offseason ==
=== Move to the Sun Belt ===
Prior to the 2025 season, the Sun Belt Conference extended an invitation to Louisiana Tech to join the conference as early as the 2026 season, pending exit negotiations between the university and Conference USA (CUSA). Louisiana Tech accepted the invitation to join the conference no later than 2027, later agreeing to join beginning with the 2026–27 academic year. After months of negotiations between the university and CUSA, no financial settlement had been reached between the two parties; this resulted in the Bulldogs initially being on both the CUSA and Sun Belt football schedules for the 2026 season.

In March 2026, the University of Louisiana System, which includes Louisiana Tech, filed a lawsuit against Conference USA, saying "CUSA has declined to engage in meaningful resolution and has instead placed Louisiana Tech on its 2026–27 athletic schedule in disregard of Tech’s explicit and repeated written notice that it would not participate in Conference USA competition beginning July 1, 2026." A month later, the two parties reached an agreement and the lawsuit was dropped, letting Louisiana Tech join the Sun Belt on July 1, 2026 while Conference USA received an unknown amount in exit fees.

=== Transfers ===
==== Outgoing ====
Player	Position	Destination
Fred Robertson	RB	Alcorn State
Jay Simon	WR	Arkansas–Monticello
JayT Jackson	CB	Bowling Green
Cam Hill	S	Central Arkansas
Jordan Pierro	CB	Eastern Washington
Mekhi Mason	LB	Kansas State
Sentel Simpson	S	Kilgore College
Evan Bullock	QB	Lamar
Omiri Wiggins	RB	McNeese
Michael Richard	S	Michigan State
Jhamal Shelby Jr.	CB	Nicholls
Clay Thevenin	RB	Rutgers
Christian Davis	DL	SMU
Daejawn Smith	WR	Southern
Kolby Thomas	WR	Southern Arkansas
Toby Mealer	OL	Southern Miss
John Hoyet Chance	P	TCU
Jacob Fields	S	TCU
Teddy Booras	QB	Texas A&M–Kingsville
Marques Singleton Jr.	WR	Texas A&M–Kingsville
Jayden Madkins	DL	Tulsa
Marlion Jackson	WR	Virginia Tech

==== Incoming ====
Player	Position	Previous school
Ahkhari Johnson	CB	Arkansas
Hunter Rioux	K	Butler CC
Kaden McIver	DL	Diablo Valley College
Marcus Calwise Jr.	WR	Eastern Kentucky
Trent Sims	LS	FIU
Tye Hylton	OL	Florida State
Taeden Rogers	CB	Golden West College
MJ Moultrie II	S	Hampton
Harrison Williams	RB	Harding
Jaden Miller	RB	Keiser
Sergio Snider	RB	Navarro College
Ty Jones	S	Norfolk State
Talyn Shettron	WR	Oklahoma State
Demario Bookhart	CB	South Carolina State
Joshua Brantley	TE	Tulane
Janard Lockhardt	CB	Tyler JC
Jamon Lee Jr.	OL	Tyler JC
Justice Williams	DL	West Florida

== Preseason ==
=== Media poll ===
In the Sun Belt preseason coaches' poll, the Bulldogs were picked to finish fourth place in the West division.

Linebacker Kolbe Fields was awarded to be in the preseason All-Sun Belt first team defense. Tight end Eli Finley was awarded to be in the preseason All-Sun Belt second team offense.

== Schedule ==
Date	Time	Opponent	Site	TV	Result	Attendance
September 5	6:30 p.m.	Northwestern State*	Joe Aillet Stadium; Ruston, LA (rivalry)	ESPN+	W 80–6	13,108
September 12	6:30 p.m.	at No. 8 LSU*	Tiger Stadium; Baton Rouge, LA	SECN+	L 14–45	102,321
September 19	3:00 p.m.	at Baylor*	McLane Stadium; Waco, TX	ESPNU	L 19–36	41,343
October 3	6:30 p.m.	Army*	Joe Aillet Stadium; Ruston, LA	ESPN+	W 31–29	18,326
October 10	6:30 p.m.	Louisiana	Joe Aillet Stadium; Ruston, LA (rivalry)	ESPN+	W 32–31	20,035
October 17	7:00 p.m.	at Louisiana–Monroe	FMOL Health/St. Francis Stadium; Monroe, LA (rivalry)	ESPN+	W 24–0	20,653
October 24	4:00 p.m.	Old Dominion^{†}	Joe Aillet Stadium; Ruston, LA	ESPN+	W 26–0	20,444
October 31	2:00 p.m.	at South Alabama	Hancock Whitney Stadium; Mobile, AL	ESPN+	W 35–20	13,078
November 7	3:00 p.m.	at Troy	Veterans Memorial Stadium; Troy, AL	ESPN+	W 41–17	22,349
November 14	4:00 p.m.	Southern Miss	Joe Aillet Stadium; Ruston, LA (Rivalry in Dixie)	ESPN+	W 63–31	15,423
November 21	6:00 p.m.	Arkansas State	Joe Aillet Stadium; Ruston, LA	ESPN+	W 48–3	15,316
November 28	11:00 a.m.	at Georgia Southern	Paulson Stadium; Statesboro, GA	ESPNU		
*Non-conference game; ^{†}Homecoming; Rankings from AP Poll (and CFP Rankings, after November 3) – Released prior to game; All times are in Central time

== Game summaries ==
=== Northwestern State (FCS, rivalry) ===
Northwestern State Demons (FCS) (0–1) at Louisiana Tech Bulldogs (0–0) – Game summary

Quarter	1	2	3	4	Total
Demons (FCS)	3	0	0	3	6
Bulldogs	21	42	14	3	80

at Joe Aillet Stadium • Ruston, Louisiana

- Date: September 5
- Game time: 6:30 p.m. CDT
- Game weather: Sunny, 91 °F (33 °C)
- Game attendance: 13,108
- Referee: Brandon Kirkland
- TV announcers (ESPN+): Malcolm Butler (play-by-play), Luke McCown (analyst) and Madison Kaufman (sideline)

Game information

First quarter

- NWST – Payne Williams III 33-yard field goal, 8:59. Demons 3–0. Drive: 11 plays, 49 yards, 6:01.
- LT – Jalen Mickens 75-yard pass from Blake Baker (Kaegan Kent kick), 8:48. Bulldogs 7–3. Drive: 1 play, 75 yards, 0:11.
- LT – Jay Wilkerson 27-yard pass from Blake Baker (Kaegan Kent kick), 7:52. Bulldogs 14–3. Drive: 3 plays, 38 yards, 0:51.
- LT – Talyn Shettron 16-yard pass from Joshua Brantley (Kaegan Kent kick), 4:04. Bulldogs 21–3. Drive: 6 plays, 48 yards, 2:17.

Second quarter

- LT –Dylone Brooks 28-yard run (Kaegan Kent kick), 13:48. Bulldogs 28–3. Drive: 8 plays, 75 yards, 2:56.
- LT – Talyn Shettron 37-yard run (Kaegan Kent kick), 11:25. Bulldogs 35–3. Drive: 2 plays, 49 yards, 0:51.
- LT – Eli Finley 9-yard pass from Blake Baker (Kaegan Kent kick), 7:51. Bulldogs 42–3. Drive: 6 plays, 46 yards, 1:55.
- LT – Dedrick Latulas 58-yard punt return (Kaegan Kent kick), 6:17. Bulldogs 49–3. Drive: 3 plays, -2 yards, 1:34.
- LT – Sergio Snider 2-yard run (Kaegan Kent kick), 4:05. Bulldogs 56–3. Drive: 3 plays, 8 yards, 1:14.
- LT – Jaden Miller 7-yard run (Kaegan Kent kick), 1:44. Bulldogs 63–3. Drive: 3 plays, 65 yards, 0:47.

Third quarter

- LT – Luke Watkins 35-yard pass from Trey Kukuk (Kaegan Kent kick), 13:22. Bulldogs 70–3. Drive: 4 plays, 60 yards, 1:32.
- LT – Dedrick Latulas 6-yard pass from Trey Kukuk (Hunter Rioux kick), 6:28. Bulldogs 77–3. Drive: 10 plays, 46 yards, 5:06.

Fourth quarter

- LT – Hunter Rioux 49-yard field goal, 8:56. Bulldogs 80–3. Drive: 6 plays, 23 yards, 2:12.
- NWST – Payne Williams III 37-yard field goal, 0:47. Bulldogs 80–6. Drive: 14 plays, 55 yards, 8:09.

Statistics	NWST	LT
First downs	7	23
Plays–yards	61–129	59–528
Rushes–yards	45–86	37–232
Passing yards	43	296
Passing: comp–att–int	5–16–1	17–22–0
Turnovers	1	0
Time of possession	35:08	24:52

Team	Category	Player	Statistics
Northwestern State	Passing	Abram Johnston	5/13, 43 yards, INT
Northwestern State	Rushing	Sage Ingram	13 carries, 48 yards
Northwestern State	Receiving	Dylan Rhodes	2 receptions, 25 yards
Louisiana Tech	Passing	Blake Baker	10/14, 232 yards, 3 TD
Louisiana Tech	Rushing	Trey Kukuk	5 carries, 50 yards
Louisiana Tech	Receiving	Jalen Mickens	3 receptions, 133 yards, TD

=== at No. 8 LSU ===
Louisiana Tech Bulldogs (1–0) at No. 8 LSU Tigers (1–0) – Game summary

Quarter	1	2	3	4	Total
Bulldogs	0	7	0	7	14
No. 8 Tigers	10	0	14	21	45

at Tiger Stadium • Baton Rouge, Louisiana

- Date: September 12
- Game time: 6:30 p.m. CDT
- Game weather: Cloudy • Temperature: 87 °F (31 °C) • Wind: SW at 7 mph
- Game attendance: 102,321
- Referee: James Carter
- TV announcers (SECN+): Clay Matvick, Rocky Boiman, and Laura Stickells

Game information

First quarter

- LSU – Scott Starzyk 29-yard field goal, 6:36. Tigers 3–0. Drive: 11 plays, 52 yards, 5:01.
- LSU – Sam Leavitt 5-yard run (Scott Starzyk kick), 3:46. Tigers 10–0. Drive: 3 plays, 44 yards, 1:11.

Second quarter

- LT – Jordan McRae 100-yard interception return (Kaegan Kent kick), 1:53. Tigers 10–7.

Third quarter

- LSU – Scott Starzyk 25-yard field goal, 10:12. Tigers 13–7. Drive: 6 plays, 46 yards, 2:57.
- LSU – Sam Leavitt 9-yard run (Sam Leavitt–Malachi Thomas pass), 4:32. Tigers 21–7. Drive: 6 plays, 60 yards, 2:20.
- LSU – Scott Starzyk 23-yard field goal, 2:12. Tigers 24–7. Drive: 4 plays, 6 yards, 1:33.

Fourth quarter

- LSU – Sam Leavitt 5-yard run (Scott Starzyk kick), 13:32. Tigers 31–7. Drive: 5 plays, 73 yards, 1:40.
- LSU – Trey'Dez Green 10-yard pass from Sam Leavitt (Scott Starzyk kick), 9:39. Tigers 38–7. Drive: 6 plays, 20 yards, 2:02.
- LT – Jalen Mickens 67-yard pass from Blake Baker (Kaegan Kent kick), 8:08. Tigers 38–14. Drive: 3 plays, 68 yards, 1:23.
- LSU – Landen Clark 7-yard run (Scott Starzyk kick), 1:48. Tigers 45–14. Drive: 7 plays, 45 yards, 2:32.

Statistics	LT	LSU
First downs	8	26
Plays–yards	55–140	85–528
Rushes–yards	31–(-3)	44–147
Passing yards	143	381
Passing: comp–att–int	14–24–1	27–41–3
Turnovers	3	4
Time of possession	25:51	34:09

Team	Category	Player	Statistics
Louisiana Tech	Passing	Blake Baker	11/21, 128 yards, TD, INT
Louisiana Tech	Rushing	Andrew Burnette	6 carries, 16 yards
Louisiana Tech	Receiving	Jalen Mickens	6 receptions, 101 yards, TD
LSU	Passing	Sam Leavitt	25/38, 344 yards, TD, 3 INT
LSU	Rushing	Dilin Jones	18 carries, 66 yards
LSU	Receiving	Trey'Dez Green	6 receptions, 104 yards, TD

=== At Baylor ===
Louisiana Tech Bulldogs (1–1) at Baylor Bears (1–1) – Game summary

Quarter	1	2	3	4	Total
Bulldogs	7	0	0	12	19
Bears	7	13	9	7	36

at McLane Stadium • Waco, Texas

- Date: September 19
- Game time: 3:00 p.m. CDT
- Game weather: Sunny • Temperature: 94 °F (34 °C) • Wind: SE at 6 miles per hour (9.7 km/h)
- Game attendance: 41,343
- Referee: Rory Bernard
- TV announcers (ESPNU): Chuckie Kempf (play-by-play) and Dustin Fox (analyst)

Game information

First quarter

- BAY – Nate Bennett 25-yard run (Rhett Armstrong kick), 10:37. Bears 7–0. Drive: 10 plays, 75 yards, 4:23.
- LT – Andrew Burnette 2-yard run (Kaegan Kent kick), 3:38. Tied 7–7. Drive: 15 plays, 75 yards, 6:59.

Second quarter

- BAY – Dawson Pendergrass 1-yard run (Rhett Armstrong kick), 12:08. Bears 14–7. Drive: 13 plays, 75 yards, 6:30.
- BAY – Louis Brown IV 51-yard pass from Nate Bennett (Rhett Armstrong kick), 10:38. Bears 21–7. Drive: 1 play, 51 yards, 0:07.

Third quarter

- BAY – Jayden McGowan 43-yard pass from Nate Bennett (two-point conversion failed), 10:14. Bears 26–7. Drive: 2 plays, 55 yards, 0:46.
- BAY – Rhett Armstrong 23-yard field goal, 1:45. Bears 29–7. Drive: 5 plays, 23 yards, 2:02.

Fourth quarter

- LT – Eli Finley 19-yard pass from Trey Kukuk (two-point conversion failed), 8:18. Bears 29–13. Drive: 7 plays, 53 yards, 3:34.
- LT – Jalen Mickens 2-yard run (two-point conversion failed), 5:14. Bears 29–19. Drive: 4 plays, 47 yards, 1:20.
- BAY – Jayden McGowan 36-yard pass from Nate Bennett (Rhett Armstrong kick), 4:10. Bears 36–19. Drive: 4 plays, 47 yards, 1:03.

Statistics	LT	BAY
First downs	25	22
Total yards	362	418
Rushing yards	139	165
Passing yards	223	253
Turnovers	2	2
Time of possession	32:18	27:42

Team	Category	Player	Statistics
Louisiana Tech	Passing	Trey Kukuk	25/44, 223 yards, TD, INT
Louisiana Tech	Rushing	Trey Kukuk	11 carries, 75 yards
Louisiana Tech	Receiving	Eli Finley	8 receptions, 65 yards, TD
Baylor	Passing	Nate Bennett	21/24, 253 yards, 3 TDs
Baylor	Rushing	Ryelan Morris	4 carries, 55 yards
Baylor	Receiving	Jayden McGowan	2 receptions, 79 yards, 2 TDs

=== Army ===
Army Black Knights (2–1) at Louisiana Tech Bulldogs (1–2) – Game summary

Quarter	1	2	3	4	Total
Black Knights	0	0	0	0	0
Bulldogs	0	0	0	0	0

at Joe Aillet Stadium • Ruston, Louisiana

- Date: October 3
- Game time: 6:30 p.m. CDT
- Game attendance: 18,326
- TV announcers (ESPN+): Malcolm Butler (play-by-play) and Luke McCown (analyst)

Statistics	ARMY	LT
First downs		
Total yards		
Rushing yards		
Passing yards		
Turnovers		
Time of possession		

Team	Category	Player	Statistics
Army	Passing		
Army	Rushing		
Army	Receiving		
Louisiana Tech	Passing		
Louisiana Tech	Rushing		
Louisiana Tech	Receiving		

=== Louisiana (rivalry) ===
Louisiana Ragin' Cajuns (4–1) at Louisiana Tech Bulldogs (2–2) – Game summary

Quarter	1	2	3	4	Total
Ragin' Cajuns	0	0	0	0	0
Bulldogs	0	0	0	0	0

at Joe Aillet Stadium • Ruston, Louisiana

- Date: October 10
- Game time: 6:30 p.m. CDT
- TV announcers (ESPN+): Malcolm Butler (play-by-play) and Luke McCown (analyst)

Statistics	LA	LT
First downs		
Total yards		
Rushing yards		
Passing yards		
Turnovers		
Time of possession		

Team	Category	Player	Statistics
Louisiana	Passing		
Louisiana	Rushing		
Louisiana	Receiving		
Louisiana Tech	Passing		
Louisiana Tech	Rushing		
Louisiana Tech	Receiving		

=== At Louisiana–Monroe (rivalry) ===
Louisiana Tech Bulldogs (3–2) at Louisiana–Monroe Warhawks (0–5) – Game summary

Quarter	1	2	3	4	Total
Bulldogs	0	0	0	0	0
Warhawks	0	0	0	0	0

at Malone Stadium • Monroe, Louisiana

- Date: October 17

Statistics	LT	ULM
First downs		
Total yards		
Rushing yards		
Passing yards		
Turnovers		
Time of possession		

Team	Category	Player	Statistics
Louisiana Tech	Passing		
Louisiana Tech	Rushing		
Louisiana Tech	Receiving		
Louisiana–Monroe	Passing		
Louisiana–Monroe	Rushing		
Louisiana–Monroe	Receiving		

=== Old Dominion ===
Old Dominion Monarchs (2–5) at Louisiana Tech Bulldogs (4–2) – Game summary

Quarter	1	2	3	4	Total
Monarchs	0	0	0	0	0
Bulldogs	0	0	0	0	0

at Joe Aillet Stadium • Ruston, Louisiana

- Date: October 24

Statistics	ODU	LT
First downs		
Total yards		
Rushing yards		
Passing yards		
Turnovers		
Time of possession		

Team	Category	Player	Statistics
Old Dominion	Passing		
Old Dominion	Rushing		
Old Dominion	Receiving		
Louisiana Tech	Passing		
Louisiana Tech	Rushing		
Louisiana Tech	Receiving		

=== At South Alabama ===
Louisiana Tech Bulldogs (5–2) at South Alabama Jaguars (4–3) – Game summary

Quarter	1	2	3	4	Total
Bulldogs	7	21	7	0	35
Jaguars	14	6	0	0	20

at Hancock Whitney Stadium • Mobile, Alabama

- Date: October 31
- Game time: 2:00 p.m. CDT
- Game weather: Sunny
- Game attendance: 13,078
- Referee: Jeremy Parker
- TV announcers (ESPN+): Pat Greenwood (play-by-play) and Brian Genard (analyst)

Game information

First quarter

- (9:33) USA – Anthony Eager 10-yard pass from Jared Hollins, Davis Little kick (Drive: 7 plays, 51 yards, 3:21; South Alabama 7–0)
- (8:12) LT – Andrew Burnette 4-yard run, Kaegan Kent kick (Drive: 4 plays, 91 yards, 1:12; Tied 7–7)
- (0:39) USA – Anthony Eager 9-yard pass from Jared Hollins, Davis Little kick (Drive: 14 plays, 75 yards, 7:33; South Alabama 14–7)

Second quarter

- (13:03) LT – Marcus Calwise Jr. 22-yard pass from Blake Baker, Kaegan Kent kick (Drive: 8 plays, 82 yards, 2:30; Tied 14–14)
- (8:50) LT – Jalen Mickens 27-yard pass from Trey Kukuk, Kaegan Kent kick (Drive: 4 plays, 53 yards, 1:37; Louisiana Tech 21–14)
- (6:47) USA – Keenan Phillips 11-yard run (Drive: 4 plays, 75 yards, 2:03; Louisiana Tech 21–20)
- (3:12) LT – Blake Baker 35-yard pass from Blake Baker, Kaegan Kent kick (Drive: 8 plays, 75 yards, 3:35; Louisiana Tech 21–20)

Third quarter

- (0:39) LT – Luke Watkins 4-yard pass from Blake Baker, Kaegan Kent kick (Drive: 2 plays, 10 yards, 0:41; Louisiana Tech 21–20)

Fourth quarter

No scoring plays

Statistics	LT	USA
First downs	16	24
Total yards	315	397
Rushing yards	121	205
Passing yards	194	192
Turnovers	0	2
Time of possession	26:37	33:23

Team	Category	Player	Statistics
Louisiana Tech	Passing	Blake Baker	10/16, 167 yards, 3 TD
Louisiana Tech	Rushing	Rayshun Hurt	6 carries, 40 yards
Louisiana Tech	Receiving	Marcus Calwise Jr.	3 receptions, 68 yards, 2 TD
South Alabama	Passing	Jared Hollins	14/31, 192 yards, 2 TD, INT
South Alabama	Rushing	PJ Martin	12 carries, 82 yards
South Alabama	Receiving	Anthony Eager	7 receptions, 102 yards, 2 TD

=== At Troy ===
Louisiana Tech Bulldogs (6–2) at Troy Trojans (4–4) – Game summary

Quarter	1	2	3	4	Total
Bulldogs	0	0	0	0	0
Trojans	0	0	0	0	0

at Veterans Memorial Stadium • Troy, Alabama

- Date: November 7
- Game time: 3:00 p.m. CDT
- TV: ESPN+

Statistics	LT	TROY
First downs		
Total yards		
Rushing yards		
Passing yards		
Turnovers		
Time of possession		

Team	Category	Player	Statistics
Louisiana Tech	Passing		
Louisiana Tech	Rushing		
Louisiana Tech	Receiving		
Troy	Passing		
Troy	Rushing		
Troy	Receiving		

=== Southern Miss (Rivalry in Dixie) ===
Southern Miss Golden Eagles (3–6) at Louisiana Tech Bulldogs (7–2) – Game summary

Quarter	1	2	3	4	Total
Golden Eagles	0	0	0	0	0
Bulldogs	0	0	0	0	0

at Joe Aillet Stadium • Ruston, Louisiana

- Date: November 14

Statistics	USM	LT
First downs		
Total yards		
Rushing yards		
Passing yards		
Turnovers		
Time of possession		

Team	Category	Player	Statistics
Southern Miss	Passing		
Southern Miss	Rushing		
Southern Miss	Receiving		
Louisiana Tech	Passing		
Louisiana Tech	Rushing		
Louisiana Tech	Receiving		

=== Arkansas State ===
Arkansas State Red Wolves (4–6) at Louisiana Tech Bulldogs (8–2) – Game summary

Quarter	1	2	3	4	Total
Red Wolves	0	0	0	0	0
Bulldogs	0	0	0	0	0

at Joe Aillet Stadium • Ruston, Louisiana

- Date: November 21

Statistics	ARST	LT
First downs		
Total yards		
Rushing yards		
Passing yards		
Turnovers		
Time of possession		

Team	Category	Player	Statistics
Arkansas State	Passing		
Arkansas State	Rushing		
Arkansas State	Receiving		
Louisiana Tech	Passing		
Louisiana Tech	Rushing		
Louisiana Tech	Receiving		

=== At Georgia Southern ===
Louisiana Tech Bulldogs at Georgia Southern Eagles – Game summary

Quarter	1	2	3	4	Total
Bulldogs	0	0	0	0	0
Eagles	0	0	0	0	0

at Paulson Stadium • Statesboro, Georgia

- Date: November 28

Statistics	LT	GASO
First downs		
Total yards		
Rushing yards		
Passing yards		
Turnovers		
Time of possession		

Team	Category	Player	Statistics
Louisiana Tech	Passing		
Louisiana Tech	Rushing		
Louisiana Tech	Receiving		
Georgia Southern	Passing		
Georgia Southern	Rushing		
Georgia Southern	Receiving		
