= 2026 American Conference football season =

- League: NCAA Division I Football Bowl Subdivision
- Sport: Football
- Duration: August 29, 2026–December 12, 2026
- Teams: 14
- TV partner(s): ABC, ESPN, ESPN2, ESPNU, and CBS Sports Network

2027 NFL draft

Regular season

American Conference Championship Game
- Date: December 5, 2026

Seasons
- ← 2025 2027 →

2026 American Conference football standings
	Conf.			Overall
Team	W		L	W		L
UTSA	6	–	1	9	–	2
Memphis	5	–	2	8	–	3
East Carolina	5	–	2	7	–	4
North Texas	5	–	2	7	–	4
UAB	4	–	3	6	–	5
Army	4	–	3	5	–	5
Tulsa	4	–	3	7	–	4
Florida Atlantic	4	–	3	7	–	4
Tulane	4	–	3	6	–	5
Navy	3	–	4	4	–	6
South Florida	2	–	5	6	–	5
Rice	1	–	6	2	–	9
Charlotte	1	–	6	1	–	10
Temple	1	–	6	2	–	9
Championship: December 5, 2026
As of November 22, 2026; Rankings from AP poll

The 2026 American Conference football season is the 35th NCAA Division I FBS Football season of the American Conference. It is the 14th season for the conference after the breakup of the former Big East Conference (whose charter legally belongs to the American), and the 12th season of the College Football Playoff in place. The American is considered a member of the Group of Six (G6) together with Conference USA, the MAC, Mountain West Conference, Pac-12 Conference, and the Sun Belt Conference. The conference has 14 football members for the 2026–27 season.

== Head coaches ==
- On October 3, 2025, UAB fired its head coach Trent Dilfer. UAB named its offensive coordinator Alex Mortensen as the interim head coach, before later promoting him to permanent head coach.
- On November 25, 2025, North Texas head coach Eric Morris was announced as the next head coach of Oklahoma State in the Big 12 Conference beginning in 2026. Neal Brown was announced as the new head coach for North Texas on December 2, 2025.
- On November 30, 2025, three American Conference head coaches were announced as new head coaches of Southeastern Conference programs.
  - Memphis head coach Ryan Silverfield was announced as the new head coach at Arkansas. On December 6, 2025, Charles Huff, previously head coach at Southern Miss, was named the Tigers' new head coach.
  - South Florida head coach Alex Golesh was announced as Auburn's new head coach. On December 3, 2025, Ohio State offensive coordinator Brian Hartline was named the Bulls' new head coach, effective with the end of the Buckeyes' College Football Playoff (CFP) run.
  - Tulane head coach Jon Sumrall was announced as the new head coach at Florida. He continued to coach the Green Wave in the American championship game and the CFP. On December 13, 2026, Tulane announced Will Hall as its new head coach, effective with the Green Wave's elimination from the CFP.

=== Records ===
Team	Head coach	Years at school	Overall record	Record at school	AAC record
Army	Jeff Monken	13	127–79 (.617)	89–63 (.586)	12–5 (.706)
Charlotte	Tim Albin	2	59–38 (.608)	1–11 (.083)	0–8 (.000)
East Carolina	Blake Harrell	3	14–5 (.737)	14–5 (.737)	10–3 (.769)
Florida Atlantic	Zach Kittley	2	4–8 (.333)	4–8 (.333)	3–5 (.375)
Memphis	Charles Huff	1	39–25 (.609)	0–0 (–)	0–0 (–)
Navy	Brian Newberry	4	26–12 (.684)	26–12 (.684)	17–7 (.708)
North Texas	Neal Brown	1	72–51 (.585)	0–0 (–)	0–0 (–)
Rice	Scott Abell	2	91–60 (.603)	5–8 (.385)	2–6 (.250)
South Florida	Brian Hartline	1	0–0 (–)	0–0 (–)	0–0 (–)
Temple	K. C. Keeler	2	276–119–1 (.698)	5–7 (.417)	3–5 (.375)
Tulane	Will Hall	1	70–50 (.583)	0–0 (–)	0–0 (–)
Tulsa	Tre Lamb	2	31–33 (.484)	4–8 (.333)	1–7 (.125)
UAB	Alex Mortensen	1	2–4 (.333)	2–4 (.333)	2–3 (.400)
UTSA	Jeff Traylor	7	53–26 (.671)	53–26 (.671)	15–9 (.625)

Note:

- Records shown after the 2025 season
- Years at school includes 2026 season

== Rankings ==
		Pre	Wk 1	Wk 2	Wk 3	Wk 4	Wk 5	Wk 6	Wk 7	Wk 8	Wk 9	Wk 10	Wk 11	Wk 12	Wk 13	Wk 14	Wk 15	Final
Army	AP																	
Army	C																	
Army	CFP	Not released																
Charlotte	AP																	
Charlotte	C																	
Charlotte	CFP	Not released																
East Carolina	AP																	
East Carolina	C																	
East Carolina	CFP	Not released																
Florida Atlantic	AP																	
Florida Atlantic	C																	
Florida Atlantic	CFP	Not released																
Memphis	AP	RV	RV															
Memphis	C	RV	RV					RV			RV							
Memphis	CFP	Not released																
Navy	AP	RV	RV															
Navy	C	RV	RV															
Navy	CFP	Not released																
North Texas	AP																	
North Texas	C								RV	RV	RV							
North Texas	CFP	Not released																
Rice	AP																	
Rice	C																	
Rice	CFP	Not released																
South Florida	AP																	
South Florida	C																	
South Florida	CFP	Not released																
Temple	AP																	
Temple	C																	
Temple	CFP	Not released																
Tulane	AP	RV																
Tulane	C																	
Tulane	CFP	Not released																
Tulsa	AP			RV	RV													
Tulsa	C			RV	RV													
Tulsa	CFP	Not released																
UAB	AP																	
UAB	C																	
UAB	CFP	Not released																
UTSA	AP									RV	RV							
UTSA	C					RV		RV	RV	RV	RV							
UTSA	CFP	Not released																

Legend
	Improvement in ranking
	Drop in ranking
	Not ranked previous week
	No change in ranking from previous week
RV	Received votes but were not ranked in Top 25 of poll
т	Tied with team above or below also with this symbol

AP -

Coaches -

CFP -

== Schedule ==
The 2026 season was released on February 2.

Index to colors and formatting
American member won
American member lost
American teams in **bold**

=== Week 0 ===
Date	Time	Visiting team	Home team	Site	TV	Result	Attendance	Ref.
August 29	10:00 p.m.	**Memphis**	UNLV	Allegiant Stadium • Paradise, NV	FOX	**W** 27–21	31,384	
^{#}Rankings from AP Poll released prior to game. All times are in Eastern Time.

=== Week 1 ===
Date	Time	Visiting team	Home team	Site	TV	Result	Attendance	Ref.
September 3	9:00 p.m.	**UAB**	Illinois	Gies Memorial Stadium • Champaign, IL	BTN	**L** 23–42	52,673	
September 5	12:00 p.m.	Bryant	**Army**	Michie Stadium • West Point, NY	CBSSN	**W** 59–3	21,538	
September 5	12:00 p.m.	**East Carolina**	No. 13 Alabama	Bryant–Denny Stadium • Tuscaloosa, AL	ABC	**L** 10–48	100,077	
September 5	12:00 p.m.	**North Texas**	No. 6 Indiana	Memorial Stadium • Bloomington, IN	FOX	**L** 16–52	54,493	
September 5	2:00 p.m.	No. 6 (FCS) Rhode Island	**Temple**	Lincoln Financial Field • Philadelphia, PA	ESPN+	**W** 38–14	13,484	
September 5	3:30 p.m.	**Tulane**	Duke	Wallace Wade Stadium • Durham, NC	ACCN	**L** 3–17	16,113	
September 5	3:30 p.m.	The Citadel	**Charlotte**	Jerry Richardson Stadium • Charlotte, NC	ESPN+	**L** 41–43 ^{3OT}	13,274	
September 5	3:30 p.m.	UT Rio Grande Valley	**UTSA**	Alamodome • San Antonio, TX	ESPN+	**W** 45–16	33,403	
September 5	3:30 p.m.	Towson	**Navy**	Navy–Marine Corps Memorial Stadium • Annapolis, MD	CBSSN	**W** 42–15	32,654	
September 5	3:45 p.m.	Oklahoma State	**Tulsa**	Skelly Field at H. A. Chapman Stadium • Tulsa, OK (rivalry)	ESPNU	**W** 24–10	28,520	
September 5	7:00 p.m.	Houston Christian	**Rice**	Rice Stadium • Houston, TX	ESPN+	**W** 31–3	15,128	
September 5	7:00 p.m.	Arkansas State	**Memphis**	Simmons Bank Liberty Stadium • Memphis, TN (Paint Bucket Bowl)	ESPN+	**W** 42–24	45,632	
September 5	7:00 p.m.	FIU	**South Florida**	Raymond James Stadium • Tampa, FL	ESPN+	**W** 19–9	41,847	
September 5	7:45 p.m.	**Florida Atlantic**	Florida	Ben Hill Griffin Stadium • Gainesville, FL	SECN	**L** 21–66	90,295	
^{#}Rankings from AP Poll released prior to game. All times are in Eastern Time.

=== Week 2 ===
Date	Time	Visiting team	Home team	Site	TV	Result	Attendance	Ref.
September 12	12:00 p.m.	Appalachian State	**East Carolina**	Dowdy–Ficklen Stadium • Greenville, NC	ESPNU	**L** 24–27	40,074	
September 12	12:00 p.m.	**South Florida**	**Army**	Michie Stadium • West Point, NY	CBSSN	**USF** 28–24	23,670	
September 12	12:00 p.m.	No. 16 Penn State	**Temple**	Lincoln Financial Field • Philadelphia, PA	ESPN2	**L** 9–27	61,714	
September 12	3:30 p.m.	Louisiana–Monroe	**UAB**	Protective Stadium • Birmingham, AL	ESPN+	**W** 26–20	21,153	
September 12	3:30 p.m.	**UTSA**	Texas State	UFCU Stadium • San Marcos, TX (I-35 Rivalry)	The CW	**W** 31–26	22,019	
September 12	3:30 p.m.	**Rice**	No. 3 Notre Dame	Notre Dame Stadium • Notre Dame, IN	NBC	**L** 0–52	77,622	
September 12	3:45 p.m.	UNLV	**North Texas**	DATCU Stadium • Denton, TX	ESPNU	**W** 44–6	20,331	
September 12	6:00 p.m.	**Memphis**	Boise State	Albertsons Stadium • Boise, ID	USA	**L** 20–38	34,439	
September 12	7:00 p.m.	South Alabama	**Tulane**	Yulman Stadium • New Orleans, LA	ESPN+	**W** 28–24	24,323	
September 12	7:00 p.m.	**Tulsa**	Sam Houston	Bowers Stadium • Huntsville, TX	ESPN+	**W** 23–17		
September 12	7:30 p.m.	**Navy**	**Florida Atlantic**	Flagler Credit Union Stadium • Boca Raton, FL	ESPNU	**FAU** 38–30	22,273	
September 12	7:45 p.m.	**Charlotte**	No. 9 Ole Miss	Vaught–Hemingway Stadium • Oxford, MS	ESPN2	**L** 9–41	68,134	
^{#}Rankings from AP Poll released prior to game. All times are in Eastern Time.

=== Week 3 ===
Date	Time	Visiting team	Home team	Site	TV	Result	Attendance	Ref.
September 19	12:00 p.m.	**North Texas**	Texas State	UFCU Stadium • San Marcos, TX	USA	**L** 35–49	14,166	
September 19	12:00 p.m.	**Tulane**	Kansas State	Bill Snyder Family Football Stadium • Manhattan, KS	ESPN2	**L** 20–31	51,846	
September 19	3:00 p.m.	**Temple**	Toledo	Glass Bowl • Toledo, OH	CBSSN	**L** 48–49 ^{OT}	19,011	
September 19	6:00 p.m.	**Charlotte**	Appalachian State	Kidd Brewer Stadium • Boone, NC	ESPN+	**L** 21–26	28,296	
September 19	6:00 p.m.	**East Carolina**	Old Dominion	S.B. Ballard Stadium • Norfolk, VA	ESPN+	**W** 20–17	21,444	
September 19	6:00 p.m.	FIU	**Florida Atlantic**	Flagler Credit Union Stadium • Boca Raton, FL (Shula Bowl)	ESPN+	**W** 16–10	20,714	
September 19	7:00 p.m.	UT Martin	**Memphis**	Simmons Bank Liberty Stadium • Memphis, TN	ESPN+	**W** 45–21	30,840	
September 19	7:00 p.m.	Western Michigan	**Rice**	Rice Stadium • Houston, TX	ESPN+	**L** 21–28	14,255	
September 19	7:00 p.m.	East Texas A&M	**Tulsa**	Skelly Field at H. A. Chapman Stadium • Tulsa, OK	ESPN+	**W** 42–0	16,288	
September 19	7:00 p.m.	Delaware State	**South Florida**	Raymond James Stadium • Tampa, FL	ESPN+	**W** 59–17	32,345	
September 19	8:00 p.m.	**UTSA**	No. 1 Texas	Darrell K Royal–Texas Memorial Stadium • Austin, TX	SECN+	**L** 6–30	32,345	
September 19	8:00 p.m.	**UAB**	Louisiana	Cajun Field • Lafayette, LA	ESPN+	**L** 14–21	18,216	
^{#}Rankings from AP Poll released prior to game. All times are in Eastern Time.

=== Week 4 ===
Date	Time	Visiting team	Home team	Site	TV	Result	Attendance	Ref.
September 25	4:00 p.m.	**Army**	**Temple**	Lincoln Financial Field • Philadelhpia, PA	ESPN	**ARMY** 21–17	13,449	
September 25	7:00 p.m.	**Navy**	**UAB**	Protective Stadium • Birmingham, AL	ESPN	**UAB** 24–20	24,647	
September 26	12:00 p.m.	Colorado State	**UTSA**	Alamodome • San Antonio, TX	ESPNU	**W** 59–45	17,109	
September 26	4:00 p.m.	North Carolina Central	**East Carolina**	Dowdy–Ficklen Stadium • Greenville, NC	ESPN+	**W** 42–9	43,772	
September 26	5:00 p.m.	**South Florida**	Bowling Green	Doyt Perry Stadium • Bowling Green, OH	ESPN+	**W** 14–6	22,265	
September 26	6:30 p.m.	Louisiana	**Charlotte**	Jerry Richardson Stadium • Charlotte, NC	ESPN+	**L** 7–34	14,311	
September 26	7:00 p.m.	Southern Miss	**Tulane**	Yulman Stadium • New Orleans, LA (Battle for the Bell)	ESPN+	**W** 24–21	22,984	
September 26	7:30 p.m.	Houston Christian	**North Texas**	DATCU Stadium • Denton, TX	ESPN+	**W** 63–14	21,718	
September 26	8:00 p.m.	**Florida Atlantic**	Louisiana–Monroe	Malone Stadium • Monroe, LA	ESPN+	**W** 45–17	15,326	
September 26	8:00 p.m.	**Tulsa**	Arkansas	Donald W. Reynolds Razorback Stadium • Fayetteville, AR	SECN+	**L** 6–34	72,890	
September 26	10:00 p.m.	**Rice**	Fresno State	Valley Children's Stadium • Fresno, CA	The CW	**L** 24–38	39,001	
^{#}Rankings from AP Poll released prior to game. All times are in Eastern Time.

=== Week 5 ===
Date	Time	Visiting team	Home team	Site	TV	Result	Attendance	Ref.
October 1	9:00 p.m.	**North Texas**	**Tulsa**	Skelly Field at H. A. Chapman Stadium • Tulsa, OK	ESPN	**UNT** 45–44 ^{OT}	14,938	
October 3	11:00 a.m.	**Memphis**	**Charlotte**	Jerry Richardson Stadium • Charlotte, NC	ESPN+	**MEM** 59–8	8,856	
October 3	12:00 p.m.	**Navy**	Air Force	Falcon Stadium • USAF Academy, CO (Commander-in-Chief's Trophy)	CBS	**L** 9–14	39,441	
October 3	3:30 p.m.	Samford	**UAB**	Protective Stadium • Birmingham, AL	ESPN+	**W** 33–14	22,126	
October 3	6:00 p.m.	Texas Southern	**Florida Atlantic**	Flagler Credit Union Stadium • Boca Raton, FL	ESPN+	**W** 66–10	23,736	
October 3	7:00 p.m.	**UTSA**	**Rice**	Rice Stadium • Houston, TX	ESPN+	**UTSA** 16–14	16,739	
October 3	7:30 p.m.	**Temple**	**South Florida**	Raymond James Stadium • Tampa, FL	ESPNU	**TEM** 17–13	36,349	
October 3	7:30 p.m.	**Army**	Louisiana Tech	Joe Aillet Stadium • Ruston, LA	ESPN+	**L** 29–31	18,326	
^{#}Rankings from AP Poll released prior to game. All times are in Eastern Time.

=== Week 6 ===
Date	Time	Visiting team	Home team	Site	TV	Result	Attendance	Ref.
October 8	7:30 p.m.	**South Florida**	UTSA	Alamodome • San Antonio, TX	ESPN	**UTSA** 31–24	17,632	
October 10	12:00 p.m.	**Tulane**	Army	Michie Stadium • West Point, NY	CBSSN	**ARMY** 20–17	29,722	
October 10	1:00 p.m.	**Rice**	East Carolina	Dowdy–Ficklen Stadium • Greenville, NC	ESPN+	**ECU** 28–12	33,968	
October 10	3:30 p.m.	**Tulsa**	Navy	Navy–Marine Corps Memorial Stadium • Annapolis, MD	CBSSN	**NAVY** 34–26	30,963	
October 10	3:30 p.m.	**Charlotte**	North Texas	DATCU Stadium • Denton, TX	ESPN+	**UNT** 50–10	17,411	
October 10	3:45 p.m.	UConn	Temple	Lincoln Financial Field • Philadelphia, PA	ESPNU	**L** 20–34	21,112	
October 10	7:00 p.m.	**UAB**	Memphis	Simmons Bank Liberty Stadium • Memphis, TN (Battle for the Bones)	ESPN2	**MEM** 38–13	30,322	
^{#}Rankings from AP Poll released prior to game. All times are in Eastern Time.

=== Week 7 ===
Date	Time	Visiting team	Home team	Site	TV	Result	Attendance	Ref.
October 15	7:30 p.m.	**East Carolina**	UAB	Protective Stadium • Birmingham, AL	ESPN	**UAB** 30–17 ^{OT}	19,834	
October 16	7:30 p.m.	**Memphis**	Tulane	Yulman Stadium • New Orleans, LA	ESPN	**TULN** 31–17	20,083	
October 17	12:00 p.m.	**Florida Atlantic**	Army	Michie Stadium • West Point, NY	CBSSN	**ARMY** 56–24	28,537	
October 17	1:00 p.m.	**Charlotte**	Temple	Lincoln Financial Field • Philadelphia, PA	ESPN+	**CHAR** 38–31	11,589	
October 17	4:30 p.m.	**Tulsa**	Rice	Rice Stadium • Houston, TX	ESPN+	**TLSA** 38–17	14,626	
October 17	7:00 p.m.	Kent State	South Florida	Raymond James Stadium • Tampa, FL	ESPN+	**W** 29–2	31,384	
October 17	8:00 p.m.	**Navy**	UTSA	Alamodome • San Antonio, TX	ESPNU	**UTSA** 38–34	23,297	
^{#}Rankings from AP Poll released prior to game. All times are in Eastern Time.

=== Week 8 ===
Date	Time	Visiting team	Home team	Site	TV	Result	Attendance	Ref.
October 22	7:30 p.m.	**East Carolina**	**Memphis**	Simmons Bank Liberty Stadium • Memphis, TN	ESPN2	**MEM** 41–34	27,788	
October 23	8:30 p.m.	**Army**	**Tulsa**	Skelly Field at H. A. Chapman Stadium • Tulsa, OK	ESPN2	**ARMY** 38–35	20,247	
October 24	12:00 p.m.	**Rice**	**Florida Atlantic**	Flagler Credit Union Stadium • Boca Raton, FL	ESPNU	**FAU** 51–49	14,212	
October 24	3:30 p.m.	**North Texas**	**Navy**	Navy–Marine Corps Memorial Stadium • Annapolis, MD	CBSSN	**UNT** 49–39	33,166	
October 24	8:00 p.m.	**UTSA**	**Tulane**	Yulman Stadium • New Orleans, LA	ESPNU	**UTSA** 42–19	19,015	
^{#}Rankings from AP Poll released prior to game. All times are in Eastern Time.

=== Week 9 ===
Date	Time	Visiting team	Home team	Site	TV	Result	Attendance	Ref.
October 29	7:30 p.m.	**Florida Atlantic**	North Texas	DATCU Stadium • Denton, TX	ESPN	**UNT** 48–41	22,092	
October 30	7:00 p.m.	**Tulane**	Charlotte	Jerry Richardson Stadium • Charlotte, NC	ESPN2	**TULN** 38–31 ^{OT}	8,106	
October 31	12:00 p.m.	No. 5 Notre Dame	Navy	Gillette Stadium • Foxborough, MA (rivalry)	ABC	**L** 13–35	61,293	
October 31	12:00 p.m.	**UAB**	South Florida	Raymond James Stadium • Tampa, FL	ESPNU	**USF** 30–10	22,829	
October 31	3:00 p.m.	**Temple**	East Carolina	Dowdy–Ficklen Stadium • Greenville, NC	ESPN+	**ECU** 17–9	30,213	
October 31	8:00 p.m.	**Army**	Memphis	Simmons Bank Liberty Stadium • Memphis, TN	ESPNU	**MEM** 49–22	32,502	
^{#}Rankings from AP Poll released prior to game. All times are in Eastern Time.

=== Week 10 ===
Date	Time	Visiting team	Home team	Site	TV	Result	Attendance	Ref.
November 5	7:30 p.m.	**UTSA**	Florida Atlantic	Flagler Credit Union Stadium • Boca Raton, FL	ESPN	**FAU** 60–29	19,115	
November 6	7:30 p.m.	**South Florida**	East Carolina	Dowdy–Ficklen Stadium • Greenville, NC	ESPN2	**ECU** 20–17	33,708	
November 7	12:00 p.m.	**Tulsa**	Tulane	Yulman Stadium • New Orleans, LA	ESPNU	**TLSA** 60–10	27,539	
November 7	3:30 p.m.	**Temple**	Navy	Navy-Marine Corps Memorial Stadium • Annapolis, MD	CBSSN	**NAVY** 42–35	31,132	
November 7	3:30 p.m.	**Charlotte**	UAB	Protective Stadium • Birmingham, AL	ESPN+	**UAB** 23–12	17,931	
November 7	4:00 p.m.	**Rice**	North Texas	DATCU Stadium • Denton, TX	ESPNU	**UNT** 52–23	23,443	
November 7	7:30 p.m.	Air Force	Army	Michie Stadium • West Point, NY (Commander-in-Chief's Trophy)	CBS	**L** 21–24	33,575	
^{#}Rankings from AP Poll released prior to game. All times are in Eastern Time.

=== Week 11 ===
Date	Time	Visiting team	Home team	Site	TV	Result	Attendance	Ref.
November 12	8:00 p.m.	Memphis	South Florida	Raymond James Stadium • Tampa, FL	ESPN	**MEM** 52–41		
November 14	1:00 p.m.	UAB	Temple	Lincoln Financial Field • Philadelphia, PA	ESPN+	**UAB** 36–10		
November 14	1:00 p.m.	East Carolina	Charlotte	Jerry Richardson Stadium • Charlotte, NC	ESPN+	**ECU** 17–16		
November 14	6:30 p.m.	Tulane	Rice	Rice Stadium • Houston, TX	ESPN+	**TULN** 20–17		
November 14	7:15 p.m.	Florida Atlantic	Tulsa	Skelly Field at H. A. Chapman Stadium • Tulsa, OK	ESPN+	**TLSA** 38–21		
November 14	9:00 p.m.	North Texas	UTSA	Alamodome • San Antonio, TX	ESPNU	**UTSA** 35–16		
^{#}Rankings from AP Poll released prior to game. All times are in Eastern Time.

=== Week 12 ===
Date	Time	Visiting team	Home team	Site	TV	Result	Attendance	Ref.
November 19	7:30 p.m.	Rice	Temple	Lincoln Financial Field • Philadelphia, PA	ESPN	**RICE** 31–27		
November 21	12:00 p.m.	Memphis	Navy	Navy–Marine Corps Memorial Stadium • Annapolis, MD	ESPN2	**NAVY** 38–34		
November 21	12:00 p.m.	North Texas	Tulane	Yulman Stadium • New Orleans, LA	ESPNU	**TULN** 28–24		
November 21	12:00 p.m.	East Carolina	Army	Michie Stadium • West Point, NY	CBSSN	**ECU** 10–6		
November 21	2:00 p.m.	Charlotte	Tulsa	Skelly Field at H. A. Chapman Stadium • Tulsa, OK	ESPN+	**TLSA** 42–14		
November 21	2:30 p.m.	South Florida	Florida Atlantic	Flagler Credit Union Stadium • Boca Raton, FL	ESPN+	**FAU** 35–14		
November 21	8:00 p.m.	UTSA	UAB	Protective Stadium • Birmingham, AL	ESPNU	**UTSA** 19–17		
^{#}Rankings from AP Poll released prior to game. All times are in Eastern Time.

=== Week 13 ===
Date	Time	Visiting team	Home team	Site	TV	Result	Attendance	Ref.
November 28		Florida Atlantic	East Carolina	Dowdy–Ficklen Stadium • Greenville, NC				
November 28		Tulane	South Florida	Raymond James Stadium • Tampa, FL				
November 27		Tulsa	UTSA	Alamodome • San Antonio, TX	ESPN			
November 27		Temple	Memphis	Simmons Bank Liberty Stadium • Memphis, TN	ESPN			
November 28		Army	Rice	Rice Stadium • Houston, TX				
November 28		Navy	Charlotte	Jerry Richardson Stadium • Charlotte, NC				
November 28		UAB	North Texas	DATCU Stadium • Denton, TX				
^{#}Rankings from AP Poll released prior to game. All times are in Eastern Time.

=== Week 14 - Conference Championship ===
Date	Time	Visiting team	Home team	Site	TV	Result	Attendance	Ref.
December 5	8:00 p.m.	TBD	TBD	TBD • TBD	ABC			
^{#}Rankings from AP Poll released prior to game. All times are in Eastern Time.

=== Week 15 ===
Date	Time	Visiting team	Home team	Site	TV	Result	Attendance	Ref.
December 12	3:00 p.m.	**Navy**	**Army**	MetLife Stadium • East Rutherford, NJ (127th Army–Navy Game, Commander-in-Chief's Trophy)	CBS			
^{#}Rankings from AP Poll released prior to game. All times are in Eastern Time.

== American records vs. other conferences ==
2026–2027 records against non-conference foes, including bowl games:

Regular season & bowls

Power Four Conferences	Record
ACC	0–1
Big 12	1–1
Big Ten	0–3
Notre Dame	0–2
SEC	0–5
Power 5 Total	1–12
Other FBS Conferences	Record
CUSA	3–0
Independents (Excluding Notre Dame)	0–1
MAC	2–2
Mountain West	2–1
Pac-12	2–3
Sun Belt	6–5
Other FBS Total	15–12
FCS Opponents	Record
Football Championship Subdivision	12–1
Total Non-Conference Record	28–25

=== American vs Power 4 matchups ===
This is a list of regular season games the American has scheduled versus power conference teams (ACC, Big Ten, Big 12, Notre Dame and SEC). All rankings are from the current AP Poll at the time of the game.

Date	Conference	Visitor	Home	Site	Score
September 3	Big Ten	UAB	Illinois	Gies Memorial Stadium • Champaign, IL	L 23–42
September 5	SEC	East Carolina	No. 13 Alabama	Bryant–Denny Stadium • Tuscaloosa, AL	L 10–48
September 5	Big Ten	North Texas	No. 6 Indiana	Memorial Stadium • Bloomington, IN	L 16–52
September 5	ACC	Tulane	Duke	Wallace Wade Stadium • Durham, NC	L 3–17
September 5	Big 12	Oklahoma State	Tulsa	Skelly Field at H. A. Chapman Stadium • Tulsa, OK	W 24–10
September 5	SEC	Florida Atlantic	Florida	Ben Hill Griffin Stadium • Gainesville, FL	L 21–66
September 12	Big Ten	No. 16 Penn State	Temple	Lincoln Financial Field • Philadelphia, PA	L 9–27
September 12	Independent	Rice	No. 3 Notre Dame	Notre Dame Stadium • Notre Dame, IN	L 0–52
September 12	SEC	Charlotte	No. 9 Ole Miss	Vaught–Hemingway Stadium • Oxford, MS	L 9–41
September 19	Big 12	Tulane	Kansas State	Bill Snyder Family Football Stadium • Manhattan, KS	L 20–31
September 19	SEC	UTSA	No. 1 Texas	Darrell K Royal–Texas Memorial Stadium • Austin, TX	L 6–30
September 26	SEC	Tulsa	Arkansas	Donald W. Reynolds Razorback Stadium • Fayetteville, AR	L 6–34
October 31	Independent	Navy	No. 5 Notre Dame	Gillette Stadium • Foxborough, MA	L 13–35

=== American vs other FBS matchups ===
The following regular season games include American teams competing against teams from the CUSA, MAC, Mountain West, Pac-12 or Sun Belt.

Date	Conference	Visitor	Home	Site	Score
August 29	Mountain West	Memphis	UNLV	Allegiant Stadium • Paradise, NV	W 27–21
September 5	Sun Belt	Arkansas State	Memphis	Simmons Bank Liberty Stadium • Memphis, TN	W 42–24
September 5	CUSA	FIU	South Florida	Raymond James Stadium • Tampa, FL	W 19–9
September 12	Sun Belt	Appalachian State	East Carolina	Dowdy–Ficklen Stadium • Greenville, NC	L 24–27
September 12	Sun Belt	Louisiana–Monroe	UAB	Protective Stadium • Birmingham, AL	W 26–20
September 12	Pac-12	UTSA	Texas State	UFCU Stadium • San Marcos, TX	W 31–26
September 12	Mountain West	UNLV	North Texas	DATCU Stadium • Denton, TX	W 44–6
September 12	Pac-12	Memphis	Boise State	Albertsons Stadium • Boise, ID	L 20–38
September 12	Sun Belt	South Alabama	Tulane	Yulman Stadium • New Orleans, LA	W 28–24
September 12	CUSA	Tulsa	Sam Houston	Bowers Stadium • Huntsville, TX	W 23–17
September 19	Pac-12	North Texas	Texas State	UFCU Stadium • San Marcos, TX	L 35–49
September 19	MAC	Temple	Toledo	Glass Bowl • Toledo, OH	L 48–49 ^{OT}
September 19	Sun Belt	Charlotte	Appalachian State	Kidd Brewer Stadium • Boone, NC	L 21–26
September 19	Sun Belt	East Carolina	Old Dominion	S.B. Ballard Stadium • Norfolk, VA	W 20–17
September 19	CUSA	FIU	Florida Atlantic	Flagler Credit Union Stadium • Boca Raton, FL	W 16–10
September 19	MAC	Western Michigan	Rice	Rice Stadium • Houston, TX	L 21–28
September 19	Sun Belt	UAB	Louisiana	Cajun Field • Lafayette, LA	L 14–21
September 26	Sun Belt	Louisiana	Charlotte	Jerry Richardson Stadium • Charlotte, NC	L 34–7
September 26	Sun Belt	Florida Atlantic	Louisiana–Monroe	Malone Stadium • Monroe, LA	W 45–17
September 26	Sun Belt	Southern Miss	Tulane	Yulman Stadium • New Orleans, LA	W 21–24
September 26	MAC	South Florida	Bowling Green	Doyt Perry Stadium • Bowling Green, OH	W 14–6
September 26	Pac-12	Colorado State	UTSA	Alamodome • San Antonio, TX	W 45–59
September 26	Pac-12	Rice	Fresno State	Valley Children's Stadium • Fresno, CA	L 24–38
October 3	Sun Belt	Army	Louisiana Tech	Joe Aillet Stadium • Ruston, LA	L 29–31
October 3	Mountain West	Navy	Air Force	Falcon Stadium • USAF Academy, CO	L 9–14
October 17	MAC	Kent State	South Florida	Raymond James Stadium • Tampa, FL	W 29–2
November 7	Mountain West	Air Force	Army	Michie Stadium • West Point, NY	

=== American vs FBS independents matchups ===
The following regular season games include American teams competing against FBS Independents, which only includes UConn for 2026.

Date	Visitor	Home	Site	Score
October 10	UConn	Temple	Lincoln Financial Field • Philadelphia, PA	L 20–34

=== American vs. FCS matchups ===
The following regular season games include American teams competing against FCS schools.

Date	Visitor	Home	Site	Score
September 5	Bryant	Army	Michie Stadium • West Point, NY	W 59–3
September 5	Rhode Island	Temple	Lincoln Financial Field • Philadelphia, PA	W 38–14
September 5	The Citadel	Charlotte	Jerry Richardson Stadium • Charlotte, NC	L 41–43 ^{3OT}
September 5	UT Rio Grande Valley	UTSA	Alamodome • San Antonio, TX	W 45–16
September 5	Towson	Navy	Navy–Marine Corps Memorial Stadium • Annapolis, MD	W 42–15
September 5	Houston Christian	Rice	Rice Stadium • Houston, TX	W 31–3
September 19	UT Martin	Memphis	Simmons Bank Liberty Stadium • Memphis, TN	W 45–21
September 19	East Texas A&M	Tulsa	Skelly Field at H. A. Chapman Stadium • Tulsa, OK	W 42–0
September 19	Delaware State	South Florida	Raymond James Stadium • Tampa, FL	W 59–17
September 26	North Carolina Central	East Carolina	Dowdy–Ficklen Stadium • Greenville, NC	W 9–42
September 26	Houston Christian	North Texas	DATCU Stadium • Denton, TX	W 14–63
October 3	Samford	UAB	Protective Stadium • Birmingham, AL	W 33–14
October 3	Texas Southern	Florida Atlantic	Flagler Credit Union Stadium • Boca Raton, FL	W 66–10

== Awards and honors ==
=== Player of the week honors ===
Week	Offensive			Defensive			Special Teams		
Week	Player	Team	Position	Player	Team	Position	Player	Team	Position
Week 1	Jaylin Carter	Memphis	RB	Chris Thompson Jr.	Tulsa	LB	Nico Gramatica	South Florida	K
Week 2	Caden Veltkamp	Florida Atlantic	QB	Ike Esonwune	UAB	LB	Jonah Delange	UAB	K
Week 3	D. J. Crowther	South Florida	RB	Ayden Ducanson	East Carolina	S	Trequan Jones	Tulsa	RB/KR
Week 4	Maurice Turner	Tulane	RB	Marlin Dean	UAB	DE	Easton Messer	Florida Atlantic	PR/WR
Week 5	Marcus Stokes	Memphis	QB	Darion White	UTSA	LB	Leonard Farrow	Florida Atlantic	KR/RB
Week 6	Tayven Jackson	North Texas	QB	Davion Rhodes	North Texas	DE	Dawson Jones	Army	K
Week 7	Cale Hellums	Army	QB	Kevin Adams III	Tulsa	S	Caile Hogan	UTSA	P
Week 8	Easton Messer	Florida Atlantic	WR	Owen Pewee	UTSA	LB	Dawson Jones (2)	Army	K
Week 9	Marcus Stokes (2)	Memphis	QB	C. J. Hicks	South Florida	DE	TJ Smith	Tulane	KR
