= 2026 Louisiana–Monroe Warhawks football team =

American college football season

2026 Louisiana–Monroe Warhawks football
- Conference: Sun Belt Conference
- West Division
- Record: 2–9 (2–5 Sun Belt)
- Head coach: Bryant Vincent (3rd season)
- Offensive coordinator: Jesse Montalto (1st season)
- Defensive coordinator: Troy Reffett (2nd season)
- Home stadium: FMOL Health/St. Francis Stadium

2026 Sun Belt Conference football standings
	Conf.			Overall
Team	W		L	W		L
East Division
Georgia Southern	6	–	1	7	–	4
James Madison	5	–	2	8	–	3
Appalachian State	4	–	3	7	–	4
Coastal Carolina	3	–	4	4	–	7
Marshall	3	–	4	6	–	5
Georgia State	2	–	5	5	–	6
Old Dominion	2	–	5	3	–	8
West Division
Louisiana Tech xy	7	–	0	9	–	2
Louisiana	5	–	2	8	–	3
South Alabama	4	–	3	6	–	5
Arkansas State	2	–	5	4	–	7
Troy	2	–	5	4	–	7
Southern Miss	2	–	5	3	–	8
Louisiana–Monroe	2	–	5	2	–	9
Championship: TBD vs. Louisiana Tech
$ – Conference champion; x – Division champion/co-champions; y – Championship game participant; As of November 22, 2026; Rankings from AP poll

The 2026 Louisiana–Monroe Warhawks football team will represent the University of Louisiana at Monroe in the Sun Belt Conference playing in the West Division during the 2026 NCAA Division I FBS football season. The Warhawks will be led by Bryant Vincent in his third season as their head coach. The Warhawks will also play their home games at the newly-renamed FMOL Health/St. Francis Stadium, which is located in Monroe, Louisiana.

== Preseason ==
=== Media poll ===
In the Sun Belt preseason coaches' poll, the Warhawks were picked to finish last place in the West division.

== Schedule ==
The football schedule was announced on March 13, 2026.

Date	Time	Opponent	Site	TV	Result	Attendance
September 5	6:30 p.m.	at Mississippi State*	Davis Wade Stadium; Starkville, MS	ESPNU	L 13–62	48,771
September 12	2:30 p.m.	at UAB*	Protective Stadium; Birmingham, AL	ESPN+	L 20–26	21,153
September 19	3:30 p.m.	Southeastern Louisiana*	FMOL Health/St. Francis Stadium; Monroe, LA	ESPN+	L 35–38	13,211
September 26	7:00 p.m.	Florida Atlantic*^{†}	FMOL Health/St. Francis Stadium; Monroe, LA	ESPN+	L 17–45	15,326
October 3	6:00 p.m.	at South Alabama	Hancock Whitney Stadium; Mobile, AL	ESPN+	L 35–52	12,800
October 17	7:00 p.m.	Louisiana Tech	FMOL Health/St. Francis Stadium; Monroe, LA (rivalry)	ESPN+	L 0–24	20,653
October 24	3:00 p.m.	at Troy	Veterans Memorial Stadium; Troy, AL	ESPN+	W 21–14	23,741
October 31	2:30 p.m.	Southern Miss	FMOL Health/St. Francis Stadium; Monroe, LA	ESPN+	L 21–35	9,086
November 7	2:00 p.m.	at Arkansas State	Centennial Bank Stadium; Jonesboro, AR	ESPN+	W 19–17	17,185
November 12	8:00 p.m.	Louisiana	FMOL Health/St. Francis Stadium; Monroe, LA (Battle on the Bayou)	ESPN2	L 21–42	9,002
November 21	1:30 p.m.	at Appalachian State	Kidd Brewer Stadium; Boone, NC	ESPN+	L 16–17 ^{OT}	28,624
November 28	12:00 p.m.	Marshall	FMOL Health/St. Francis Stadium; Monroe, LA	ESPN+		
*Non-conference game; ^{†}Homecoming; Rankings from AP Poll and CFP Rankings released prior to game; All times are in Central time

== Personnel ==
=== Transfers ===
Outgoing
Player	Position	Destination
Jerome Simmons	DL	Oregon
Stephen Saywahn	S	Unknown
D'Shaun Ford	RB	Unknown
Ozarrio Smith	RB	Unknown
Jaden Hamlin	DL	Unknown
Que McBroom	IOL	Unknown
Seidrion Langston	LB	South Alabama
Brandon Thomas	WR	Unknown
Tyrell Reed Jr.	RB	Unknown
Tyler Griffin	WR	East Tennessee State
Jonathan Bibbs	WR	UCF
Ziggy Loa	EDGE	Northern Arizona
Tae Woody	DL	Texas State
Braylon McReynolds	RB	UAB
Amarion Ware	DL	Unknown
Kamrin Canterbury	CB	Unknown
Kevontay Wells	DL	Unknown
Hunter Herring	TE	Auburn

Incoming
Player	Position	Previous Team
Parker Fulghum	WR	Clemson
Armoni Rue	CB	Michigan State
Damarcco Blanton	WR	Arkansas State
Larell Howling	CB	Coastal Carolina
Taijh Overton	S	Arkansas
CJ Wilson Jr.	EDGE	Butler
Bryson Roland	RB	Arkansas Tech
Chris Payne	S	Lake Erie
Sean Dugery	IOL	Memphis
Cade Callahan	TE	Merrimack
Jase Hoath	TE	Tennessee State
Abram Murray	K	California
Austin Carlisle	QB	Houston
Derrick Jameson	RB	Utah State
Le'Kell McGowan	EDGE	Memphis
Bryce Anderson	TE	Memphis
Julian Walker	RB	Saint Vincent
Willie Wilson	S	American International
Bright Fagbamiye	OT	Tiffin
Don Chaney Jr.	RB	Charlotte
Colton Vatne	DL	Mississippi Valley State

== Game summaries ==
=== at Mississippi State ===
Louisiana–Monroe Warhawks (0–0) at Mississippi State Bulldogs (0–0) – Game summary

Quarter	1	2	3	4	Total
Warhawks	0	3	10	0	13
Bulldogs	21	20	7	14	62

at Davis Wade Stadium • Starkville, Mississippi

- Date: September 5
- Game time: 6:30 p.m.
- Game weather: Clear • Temperature: 91 °F (33 °C) • Wind: SE 6 mph
- Game attendance: 48,711
- Referee: David Smith
- TV announcers (ESPNU): Doug Sherman (play-by-play), Tom Luginbill (analyst) and Lauren Sisler (sideline)

Game information

First quarter

- MSST – Sanfrisco Magee 6-yard pass from Kamario Taylor (Kyle Ferrie kick), 12:21. Bulldogs 7–0. Drive: 10 plays, 75 yards, 2:39.
- MSST – Zion Ragins 22-yard pass from Kamario Taylor (Kyle Ferrie kick), 10:20. Bulldogs 14–0. Drive: 3 plays, 34 yards, 0:32.
- MSST – Kamario Taylor 26-yard run (Kyle Ferrie kick), 5:58. Bulldogs 21–0. Drive: 7 plays, 78 yards, 2:32.

Second quarter

- ULM – Abram Murray 43-yard field goal, 14:56. Bulldogs 21–3. Drive: 14 plays, 50 yards, 6:02.
- MSST – Anthony Evans III 10-yard pass from Kamario Taylor (Kyle Ferrie kick), 13:15. Bulldogs 28–3. Drive: 7 plays, 75 yards, 1:41.
- MSST – Kyle Ferrie 26-yard field goal, 8:32. Bulldogs 31–3. Drive: 7 plays, 51 yards, 3:03.
- MSST – Kyle Ferrie 32-yard field goal, 3:59. Bulldogs 34–3. Drive: 11 plays, 66 yards, 2:59.
- MSST – Xavier Gayten 14-yard run (Kyle Ferrie kick), 0:35. Bulldogs 41–3. Drive: 7 plays, 80 yards, 1:17.

Third quarter

- MSST – Marquis Johnson 70-yard pass from Kamario Taylor (Kyle Ferrie kick), 13:36. Bulldogs 48–3. Drive: 2 plays, 70 yards, 0:14.
- ULM – Derrick Jameson 40-yard pass from Austin Carlisle (Abram Murray kick), 10:14. Bulldogs 48–10. Drive: 7 plays, 75 yards, 3:22.
- ULM – Abram Murray 52-yard field goal, 3:45. Bulldogs 48–13. Drive: 8 plays, 50 yards, 3:07.

Fourth quarter

- MSST – J.J. Hill 57-yard run (Kyle Ferrie kick), 7:50. Bulldogs 55–13. Drive: 4 plays, 78 yards, 1:32.
- MSST – J.J. Hill 8-yard run (Kyle Ferrie kick), 2:44. Bulldogs 62–13. Drive: 7 plays, 69 yards, 3:49.

Statistics	ULM	MSST
First downs	14	35
Plays–yards	68–278	79–762
Rushes–yards	40–138	37–345
Passing yards	140	417
Passing: comp–att–int	16–28–0	27–42–0
Turnovers	0	0
Time of possession	31:47	28:13

Team	Category	Player	Statistics
Louisiana–Monroe	Passing	Austin Carlisle	6/10, 73 yards, TD
Louisiana–Monroe	Rushing	Austin Carlisle	7 carries, 50 yards
Louisiana–Monroe	Receiving	Derrick Jameson	1 reception, 40 yards, TD
Mississippi State	Passing	Kamario Taylor	22/34, 354 yards, 4 TD
Mississippi State	Rushing	J.J. Hill	7 carries, 118 yards, 2 TD
Mississippi State	Receiving	Anthony Evans III	7 receptions, 118 yards, TD

=== at UAB ===
Louisiana–Monroe Warhawks (0–1) at UAB Blazers (0–1) – Game summary

Quarter	1	2	3	4	Total
Warhawks	7	10	3	0	20
Blazers	0	10	3	13	26

at Protective Stadium • Birmingham, Alabama

- Date: September 12
- Game time: 2:30 p.m. CDT
- Game weather: Sunny • Temperature: 91 °F (33 °C) • Wind: W at 5 miles per hour (8.0 km/h)
- Game attendance: 21,153
- Referee: Steven Anderson
- TV announcers (ESPN+): Mike Morgan and Kenechi Udeze

Game information

First quarter

- ULM – CJ Phillip 1-yard run (Abram Murray kick), 5:09. Warhawks 7–0. Drive: 12 plays, 57 yards, 5:45.

Second quarter

- UAB – Jonah Delange 41-yard field goal, 14:11. Warhawks 7–3. Drive: 13 plays, 52 yards, 5:58.
- ULM – Austin Carlisle 7-yard run (Abram Murray kick), 10:58. Warhawks 14–3. Drive: 7 plays, 75 yards, 3:13.
- UAB – Bam McReynolds 27-yard run (Jonah Delange kick), 6:45. Warhawks 14–10. Drive: 9 plays, 75 yards, 4:13.
- ULM – Abram Murray 32-yard field goal, 0:00. Warhawks 17–10. Drive: 4 plays, 4 yards, 1:25.

Third quarter

- ULM – Abram Murray 24-yard field goal, 10:24. Warhawks 20–10. Drive: 11 plays, 59 yards, 4:36.
- UAB – Jonah Delange 45-yard field goal, 7:00. Warhawks 20–13. Drive: 9 plays, 56 yards, 3:18.

Fourth quarter

- UAB – Jonah Delange 34-yard field goal, 13:32. Warhawks 20–16. Drive: 14 plays, 63 yards, 6:03.
- UAB – EJ Reid 43-yard pass from Ryder Burton (Jonah Delange kick), 9:34. Blazers 23–20. Drive: 4 plays, 53 yards, 2:50.
- UAB – Jonah Delange 42-yard field goal, 1:10. Blazers 26–20. Drive: 11 plays, 41 yards, 4:40.

Statistics	ULM	UAB
First downs	19	23
Plays–yards	63–257	68–381
Rushes–yards	43–201	52–266
Passing yards	56	115
Passing: comp–att–int	10–20–1	8–16–1
Turnovers	1	2
Time of possession	28:07	31:53

Team	Category	Player	Statistics
Louisiana–Monroe	Passing	Austin Carlisle	10/19, 56 yards, INT
Louisiana–Monroe	Rushing	Austin Carlisle	17 carries, 93 yards, TD
Louisiana–Monroe	Receiving	Marcellus Jackson	3 receptions, 21 yards
UAB	Passing	Ryder Burton	8/16, 115 yards, TD, INT
UAB	Rushing	Rod Robinson II	21 carries, 114 yards
UAB	Receiving	EJ Reid	4 receptions, 65 yards, TD

=== vs. Southeastern Louisiana (FCS) ===
Southeastern Louisiana Lions (FCS) (1–2) at Louisiana–Monroe Warhawks (0–2) – Game summary

Quarter	1	2	3	4	Total
Lions (FCS)	7	17	7	7	38
Warhawks	0	13	7	15	35

at FMOL Health/St. Francis Stadium • Monroe, Louisiana

- Date: September 19
- Game time: 3:30 p.m. CDT
- Game weather: Sunny • Temperature: 97 °F (36 °C) • Wind: SE 8 mph
- Referee: Brandon Kirkland
- TV announcers (ESPN+): Sean Fox (play-by-play) and Desmund Lighten (analyst)

Game information

First quarter

- SELA – Lonnie Shinn 31-yard pass from Kyle Lowe (Drew Talley kick), 3:10. Lions 7-0. Drive: 12 plays, 80 yards, 5:17.

Second quarter

- ULM – Parker Fulghum 17-yard pass from Austin Carlisle (Abram Murray PAT failed), 14:00. Lions 7–6. Drive: 6 plays, 29 yards, 2:36.
- SELA – Tristan Goodly 3-yard pass from Kyle Lowe (Drew Talley kick), 8:38. Lions 14–6. Drive: 5 plays, 34 yards, 2:34.
- SELA – Kyree Paul 17-yard run (Drew Talley kick), 4:10. Lions 21–6. Drive: 5 plays, 53 yards, 2:37.
- ULM – Nic Trujillo 8-yard pass from Austin Carlisle (Abram Murray kick), 0:32. Lions 21–13. Drive: 10 plays, 78 yards, 3:31.
- SELA – Drew Talley 43-yard field goal, 0:00. Lions 24–13. Drive: 6 plays, 49 yards, 0:32.

Third quarter

- SELA – Dhkai Joseph 78-yard punt return (Drew Talley kick), 5:33. Lions 31–13. Drive: 3 plays, -5 yards, 2:03.
- ULM – Derrick Jameson 32-yard run (Abram Murray kick), 2:00. Lions 31–20. Drive: 8 plays, 75 yards, 3:34.

Fourth quarter

- SELA – Richard McKneely 11-yard interception return (Drew Talley kick), 14:44. Lions 38–20. Drive: 1 play, 0 yards, 0:08.
- ULM – Derrick Jameson 2-yard run (Derrick Jameson two-point conversion run), 10:54. Lions 38–28. Drive: 9 plays, 75 yards, 3:50.
- SELA – Nic Trujillo 47-yard pass from Aidan Armenta (Abram Murray kick), 3:03. Lions 38–35. Drive: 8 plays, 97 yards, 2:48.

Statistics	SELA	ULM
First downs	15	27
Plays–yards	55-279	80-511
Rushes–yards	30-124	35-180
Passing yards	155	331
Passing: comp–att–int	18-25-0	29-45-2
Time of possession	26:31	33:29

Team	Category	Player	Statistics
Southeastern Louisiana	Passing	Kyle Lowe	18/25, 155 yards, 2 TDs
Southeastern Louisiana	Rushing	Chad Elzy Jr.	8 carries, 58 yards
Southeastern Louisiana	Receiving	Lonnie Shinn	4 receptions, 49 yards, TD
Louisiana–Monroe	Passing	Austin Carlisle	19/24, 183 yards, 2 TDs, 2 INTs
Louisiana–Monroe	Rushing	Derrick Jameson	9 carries, 85 yards, 2 TDs
Louisiana–Monroe	Receiving	Parker Fulghum	5 receptions, 88 yards, TD

=== vs. Florida Atlantic ===
Florida Atlantic Owls (2–1) at Louisiana–Monroe Warhawks (0–3) – Game summary

Quarter	1	2	Total
Owls			0
Warhawks			0

at FMOL Health/St. Francis Stadium • Monroe, Louisiana

- Date: September 26
- Game time: 7:00 p.m. CDT
- TV: ESPN+

Statistics	FAU	ULM
First downs		
Plays–yards		
Rushes–yards		
Passing yards		
Passing: comp–att–int		
Time of possession		

Team	Category	Player	Statistics
Florida Atlantic	Passing		
Florida Atlantic	Rushing		
Florida Atlantic	Receiving		
Louisiana–Monroe	Passing		
Louisiana–Monroe	Rushing		
Louisiana–Monroe	Receiving		

=== at South Alabama ===
Louisiana–Monroe Warhawks (0–4) at South Alabama Jaguars (2–2) – Game summary

Quarter	1	2	3	4	Total
Warhawks	7	7	14	7	35
Jaguars	21	10	14	7	52

at Hancock Whitney Stadium • Mobile, Alabama

- Date: October 3
- Game time: 6:00 p.m. CDT
- Game weather: Sunny
- Game attendance: 12,800
- Referee: Bruce Austin
- TV announcers (ESPN+): Pat Greenwood (play-by-play) and Brian Genard (analyst)

Game information

First quarter

- (14:08) USA – Brendan Jenkins 27-yard pass from Jared Hollins, Davis Little kick (Drive: 2 plays, 75 yards, 0:52; South Alabama 7–0)
- (13:13) USA – Masey Lewis 21-yard fumble recovery, Davis Little kick (South Alabama 14–0)
- (9:22) ULM – Zach Palmer-Smith 31-yard run, Abram Murray kick (Drive: 8 plays, 75 yards, 3:51; South Alabama 14–7)
- (5:24) USA – Keenan Phillips 1-yard run, Davis Little kick (Drive: 8 plays, 75 yards, 3:58; South Alabama 21–7)

Second quarter

- (9:27) USA – PJ Martin 1-yard run, Davis Little kick (Drive: 18 plays, 86 yards, 8:44; South Alabama 28–7)
- (5:06) ULM – Aidan Armenta pass incomplete, Abram Murray kick (Drive: 9 plays, 75 yards, 4:21; South Alabama 28–14)
- (0:06) USA – Davis Little 37-yard field goal (Drive: 7 plays, 32 yards, 1:00; South Alabama 31–14)

Third quarter

- (11:42) USA – Anthony Eager 35-yard pass from Jared Hollins, Davis Little kick (Drive: 4 plays, 49 yards, 1:54; South Alabama 38–14)
- (8:21) ULM – Bryce Anderson 2-yard pass from Aidan Armenta, Abram Murray kick (Drive: 7 plays, 75 yards, 3:21; South Alabama 38–21)
- (6:54) USA – Anthony Eager 69-yard pass from Jared Hollins, Davis Little kick (Drive: 3 plays, 88 yards, 1:20; South Alabama 45–21)
- (2:53) ULM – Aidan Armenta 1-yard run, Abram Murray kick (Drive: 12 plays, 65 yards, 4:01; South Alabama 45–28)

Fourth quarter

- (2:31) USA – Trae'von Dunbar 32-yard run, Davis Little kick (Drive: 6 plays, 80 yards, 3:37; South Alabama 52–28)
- (0:53) ULM – Darrion Gilliam 9-yard pass from Aidan Armenta, Abram Murray kick (Drive: 7 plays, 75 yards, 1:38; South Alabama 52–35)

Statistics	ULM	USA
First downs	21	20
Plays–yards	69–442	65–570
Rushes–yards	28–87	46–249
Passing yards	355	321
Passing: comp–att–int	25–41–1	14–19–0
Time of possession	28:58	31:02

Team	Category	Player	Statistics
Louisiana–Monroe	Passing	Aidan Armenta	25/41, 355 yards, 2 TD, INT
Louisiana–Monroe	Rushing	Zach Palmer-Smith	8 carries, 54 yards, TD
Louisiana–Monroe	Receiving	Marcellus Jackson	5 receptions, 93 yards
South Alabama	Passing	Jared Hollins	14/19, 321 yards, 3 TD
South Alabama	Rushing	Trae'von Dunbar	12 carries, 91 yards, TD
South Alabama	Receiving	Anthony Eager	4 receptions, 168 yards, 2 TD

=== vs. Louisiana Tech (rivalry) ===
Louisiana Tech Bulldogs (3–2) at Louisiana–Monroe Warhawks (0–5) – Game summary

Quarter	1	2	3	4	Total
Bulldogs	0	0	0	0	0
Warhawks	0	0	0	0	0

at FMOL Health/St. Francis Stadium • Monroe, Louisiana

- Date: October 17

Statistics	LT	ULM
First downs		
Total yards		
Rushing yards		
Passing yards		
Turnovers		
Time of possession		

Team	Category	Player	Statistics
Louisiana Tech	Passing		
Louisiana Tech	Rushing		
Louisiana Tech	Receiving		
Louisiana–Monroe	Passing		
Louisiana–Monroe	Rushing		
Louisiana–Monroe	Receiving		

=== at Troy ===
Louisiana–Monroe Warhawks (0–6) at Troy Trojans (3–3) – Game summary

Quarter	1	2	3	4	Total
Warhawks	0	0	0	0	0
Trojans	0	0	0	0	0

at Veterans Memorial Stadium • Troy, Alabama

- Date: October 24
- Game time: 3:00 p.m. CDT

Game information

First quarter
Second quarter
Third quarter
Fourth quarter

Statistics	ULM	TROY
First downs		
Plays–yards		
Rushes–yards		
Passing yards		
Passing: comp–att–int		
Time of possession		

Team	Category	Player	Statistics
Louisiana–Monroe	Passing		
Louisiana–Monroe	Rushing		
Louisiana–Monroe	Receiving		
Troy	Passing		
Troy	Rushing		
Troy	Receiving		

=== vs. Southern Miss ===
Southern Miss Golden Eagles (2–5) at Louisiana–Monroe Warhawks (1–6) – Game summary

Quarter	1	2	3	4	Total
Golden Eagles	0	0	0	0	0
Warhawks	0	0	0	0	0

at FMOL Health/St. Francis Stadium • Monroe, Louisiana

- Date: October 31

Game information

First quarter
Second quarter
Third quarter
Fourth quarter

Statistics	USM	ULM
First downs		
Plays–yards		
Rushes–yards		
Passing yards		
Passing: comp–att–int		
Turnovers		
Time of possession		

Team	Category	Player	Statistics
Southern Miss	Passing		
Southern Miss	Rushing		
Southern Miss	Receiving		
Louisiana–Monroe	Passing		
Louisiana–Monroe	Rushing		
Louisiana–Monroe	Receiving		

=== at Arkansas State ===
Louisiana–Monroe Warhawks (1–7) at Arkansas State Red Wolves (4–4) – Game summary

Quarter	1	2	3	4	Total
Warhawks	0	0	0	0	0
Red Wolves	0	0	0	0	0

at Centennial Bank Stadium • Jonesboro, Arkansas

- Date: November 7
- Game time: 2:00 p.m. CDT

Game information

First quarter
Second quarter
Third quarter
Fourth quarter

Statistics	ULM	ARST
First downs		
Plays–yards		
Rushes–yards		
Passing yards		
Passing: comp–att–int		
Time of possession		

Team	Category	Player	Statistics
Louisiana–Monroe	Passing		
Louisiana–Monroe	Rushing		
Louisiana–Monroe	Receiving		
Arkansas State	Passing		
Arkansas State	Rushing		
Arkansas State	Receiving		

=== vs. Louisiana (Battle on the Bayou) ===
Louisiana Ragin' Cajuns (6–3) at Louisiana–Monroe Warhawks (2–7) – Game summary

Quarter	1	2	3	4	Total
Ragin' Cajuns	0	0	0	0	0
Warhawks	0	0	0	0	0

at FMOL Health/St. Francis Stadium • Monroe, Louisiana

- Date: November 12
- Game time: 8:00 p.m.

Statistics	LA	ULM
First downs		
Plays–yards		
Rushes–yards		
Passing yards		
Passing: comp–att–int		
Time of possession		

Team	Category	Player	Statistics
Louisiana	Passing		
Louisiana	Rushing		
Louisiana	Receiving		
Louisiana–Monroe	Passing		
Louisiana–Monroe	Rushing		
Louisiana–Monroe	Receiving		

=== at Appalachian State ===
Louisiana–Monroe Warhawks (2–8) at Appalachian State Mountaineers (6–4) – Game summary

Quarter	1	2	3	4	Total
Warhawks	0	0	0	0	0
Mountaineers	0	0	0	0	0

at Kidd Brewer Stadium • Boone, North Carolina

- Date: November 21

Statistics	ULM	APP
First downs		
Plays–yards		
Rushes–yards		
Passing yards		
Passing: comp–att–int		
Time of possession		

Team	Category	Player	Statistics
Louisiana–Monroe	Passing		
Louisiana–Monroe	Rushing		
Louisiana–Monroe	Receiving		
Appalachian State	Passing		
Appalachian State	Rushing		
Appalachian State	Receiving		

=== vs. Marshall ===
Marshall Thundering Herd (0–0) at Louisiana–Monroe Warhawks (0–0) – Game summary

Quarter	1	2	3	4	Total
Thundering Herd	0	0	0	0	0
Warhawks	0	0	0	0	0

at FMOL Health/St. Francis Stadium • Monroe, Louisiana

- Date: November 28

Game information

First quarter
Second quarter
Third quarter
Fourth quarter

Statistics	MRSH	ULM
First downs		
Plays–yards		
Rushes–yards		
Passing yards		
Passing: comp–att–int		
Time of possession		

Team	Category	Player	Statistics
Marshall	Passing		
Marshall	Rushing		
Marshall	Receiving		
Louisiana–Monroe	Passing		
Louisiana–Monroe	Rushing		
Louisiana–Monroe	Receiving		
