= 2026 UAB Blazers football team =

American college football season

2026 UAB Blazers football
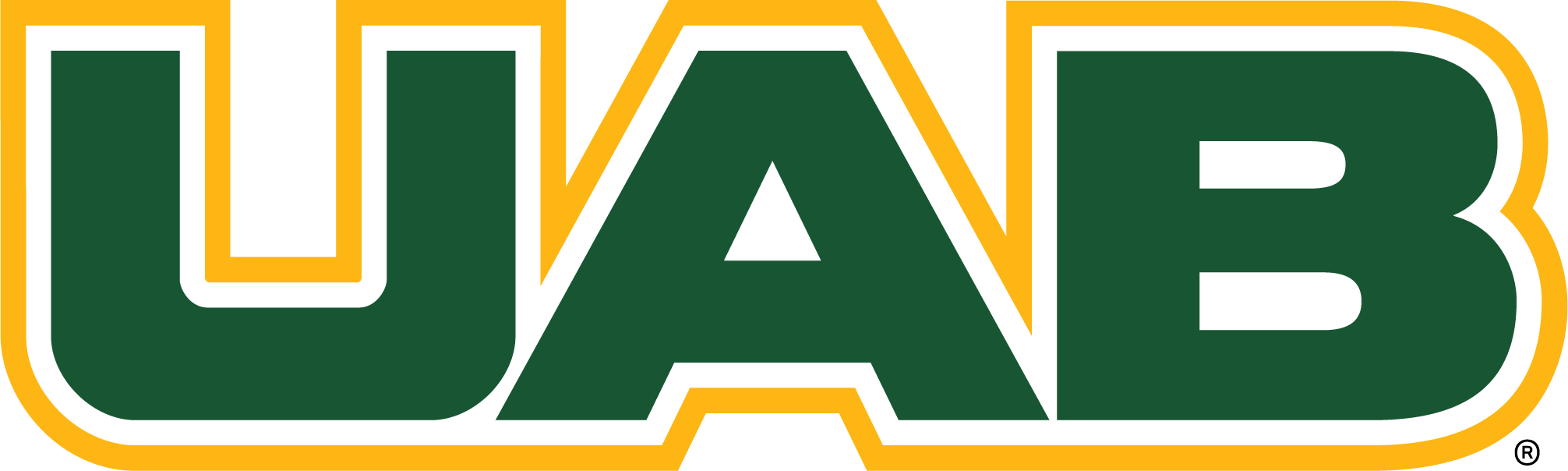
- Conference: American Conference
- Record: 6–5 (4–3 American)
- Head coach: Alex Mortensen (1st season)
- Offensive scheme: Multiple
- Defensive coordinator: Todd Grantham (1st season)
- Base defense: 3–4
- Home stadium: Protective Stadium

Uniform
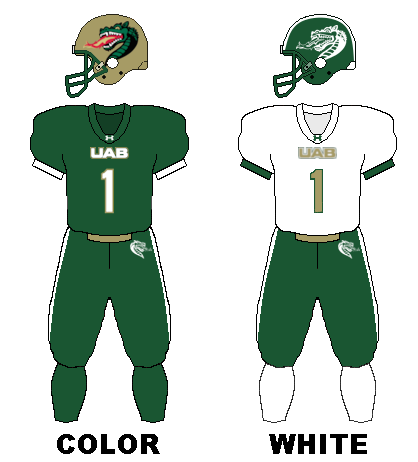

2026 American Conference football standings
	Conf.			Overall
Team	W		L	W		L
UTSA	6	–	1	9	–	2
Memphis	5	–	2	8	–	3
East Carolina	5	–	2	7	–	4
North Texas	5	–	2	7	–	4
UAB	4	–	3	6	–	5
Army	4	–	3	5	–	5
Tulsa	4	–	3	7	–	4
Florida Atlantic	4	–	3	7	–	4
Tulane	4	–	3	6	–	5
Navy	3	–	4	4	–	6
South Florida	2	–	5	6	–	5
Rice	1	–	6	2	–	9
Charlotte	1	–	6	1	–	10
Temple	1	–	6	2	–	9
Championship: December 5, 2026
As of November 22, 2026; Rankings from AP poll

The 2026 UAB Blazers football team represents the University of Alabama at Birmingham as a member of the American Conference during the 2026 NCAA Division I FBS football season. Led by first-year head coach Alex Mortensen, the Blazers play their home games at Protective Stadium in Birmingham, Alabama.

== Offseason ==
=== Transfers ===
==== Outgoing ====
Player	Position	Destination
Logan Moore	OT	Baylor
James Steel	DL	Delaware
Kyle McKinney	S	Delta State
Josiah Crawford	S	Fordham
Eamon Smalls	DL	Kansas
Perry Fisher	CB	Kennesaw State
Ja'Lyen Judson	CB	Kennesaw State
Xavier Daisy	WR	Kentucky
Jeremiah Vessel	S	Liberty
Brandon Sneh	OT	Mississippi State
Corri Milliner	WR	North Texas
JaSire Peterson	DL	Northern Arizona
Iverson Hooks	WR	Oregon
Elijah Lagg	TE	Pittsburgh
AJ Brown	S	Rice
Tariq Watson	CB	Rice
Brandon Franklin	LB	Samford
Eli Ennis	LB	Stephen F. Austin
Ezra Odinjor	EDGE	Toledo
Zach Johnson	EDGE	Toledo
Devin Hightower	LB	Tulsa
Jonathan Allen	DL	Virginia
Solomon Beebe	RB	Virginia
Tylan McNichols	LB	Wake Forest
Fred Owens	DL	West Alabama
Josh Baka	S	Unknown
Trace Campbell	QB	Unknown
Mason Chorak	IOL	Unknown
Jaylyn Ferguson	WR	Unknown
Patrick Foley	P	Unknown
Payton Kirkland	IOL	Unknown
Wyatt Martin	K	Unknown
Aaron Mattingly	TE	Unknown
Daniel Mincey	IOL	Unknown
Amorie Morrison	EDGE	Unknown
Caleb Moser	LS	Unknown
Pierre Royster	S	Unknown
J.C. Sivley	TE	Unknown
Eddy Toussom	EDGE	Unknown
AJ Johnson	WR	Withdrawn
Calib Perez	IOL	Withdrawn

==== Incoming ====
Player	Position	Previous team
Kris Wokomah	S	Baylor
Sterling Sanders	DL	Boston College
Raymond Macias	DL	Campbell
Ja'Vin Simpkins	RB	Coastal Carolina
Shaun Myers	LB	Colorado
Mantrez Walker	LB	Colorado
Samuel Riddy Jr.	OT	East Carolina
Braden Sullivan	LB	Eastern Kentucky
Tylin Jackson	EDGE	Eastern Washington
Scott Isacks III	TE	Florida
Que Billingsley	CB	Gardner–Webb
Rod Robinson II	RB	Georgia
Marlin Dean	EDGE	Georgia State
Noah Nelson	DL	Georgia State
Amos Talalele	OL	Kansas State
Eli Hall	EDGE	Liberty
Bam McReynolds	RB	Louisiana–Monroe
Badger Hargett	P	LSU
Darrell Sweeting	CB	Marshall
Jeremiah Jordan	S	Memphis
CJ Smith	WR	Memphis
Jaylen Thompson	S	Memphis
Muaaz Byard	LB	Middle Tennessee
Diezel Wilkinson	S	Montana
Blanche Gold	EDGE	Morgan State
Chris Spencer	DL	Old Dominion
KJ Daniels	WR	Oklahoma
Ike Esonwune	LB	Oklahoma State
Draden Fullbright	CB	Oklahoma State
Jotavion Pierce	S	Oklahoma State
Keyon Cox	OT	Oregon State
Anta'Veon McKenzie	S	Sacramento State
Elijah Pratt	S	SMU
Guylijah Theodule	CB	Southern Miss
Ty Mims	WR	Texas State
Sean Persson	TE	Toledo
Courage Ugochukwu	CB	Utah State
EJ Reid	WR	Wake Forest
Cooper Young	IOL	West Virginia
Cam Cunningham	DL	Youngstown State

== Schedule ==
Date	Time	Opponent	Site	TV	Result	Attendance
September 3	8:00 p.m.	at Illinois*	Gies Memorial Stadium; Champaign, IL	BTN	L 23–42	52,673
September 12	2:30 p.m.	Louisiana–Monroe*	Protective Stadium; Birmingham, AL	ESPN+	W 26–20	21,153
September 19	7:00 p.m.	at Louisiana*	Cajun Field; Lafayette, LA	ESPN+	L 14–21	18,216
September 25	6:00 p.m.	Navy	Protective Stadium; Birmingham, AL	ESPN	W 24–20	24,647
October 3	2:30 p.m.	Samford*	Protective Stadium; Birmingham, AL	ESPN+	W 33–14	22,126
October 10	6:00 p.m.	at Memphis	Simmons Bank Liberty Stadium; Memphis, TN (Battle for the Bones)	ESPN2	L 13–38	30,322
October 15	6:30 p.m.	East Carolina^{†}	Protective Stadium; Birmingham, AL	ESPN	W 30–17 ^{OT}	19,834
October 31	11:00 a.m.	at South Florida	Raymond James Stadium; Tampa, FL	ESPNU	L 10–30	22,829
November 7	2:30 p.m.	Charlotte	Protective Stadium; Birmingham, AL	ESPN+	W 23–12	17,931
November 14	12:00 p.m.	at Temple	Lincoln Financial Field; Philadelphia, PA	ESPN+	W 36–10	11,881
November 21	7:00 p.m.	UTSA	Protective Stadium; Birmingham, AL	ESPNU	L 17–19	17,176
November 28	3:00 p.m.	at North Texas	DATCU Stadium; Denton, TX	ESPNU		
*Non-conference game; ^{†}Homecoming; All times are in Central time

== Personnel ==
2026 UAB Blazers football team roster
Players
Coaches
Offense

Pos.	#	Name	Class
WR	0	Ty Mims	Sr
WR	1	CJ Smith	Sr
RB	2	Rod Robinson II	Jr
RB	3	Bam McReynolds	Sr
WR	4	EJ Reid	So
QB	5	Ryder Burton	Jr
WR	6	KJ Daniels	So
RB	7	Ja'Vin Simpkins	Jr
WR	8	Kaleb Brown	Sr
WR	9	A. J. Johnson	GS
RB	10	Marquise Collins	Jr
QB	11	Adrian Posse	So
QB	12	Vanden Dugger	Fr
WR	12	Jaylen Elder	So
WR	13	CD Gill	Fr
WR	14	Jailen Holmes	Jr
QB	16	Nate Rogers	So
QB	17	Brogan McNab	Fr
QB	18	Cam Jennings	So
TE	19	Gabriel Cline	Fr
RB	21	Hudson Higgins	Fr
RB	22	Drew Patterson	Fr
RB	28	JR Mosley	Fr
RB	30	Amari Brundidge	So
TE	40	Brayden Johnson	So
TE	44	Scott Isacks	Sr
OL	51	Payton Kirkland	Jr
OL	52	Hudson Reed	Fr
OL	55	Barrett Maddox	Jr
OL	57	Aidan Platt	Fr
OL	58	Ryan Gunter	Sr
OL	59	Jaden Ligon	So
OL	64	Cooper Young	Jr
OL	66	Donovan Lawrence	So
OL	67	Wes Wiggins	Fr
OL	68	Adam Lepkowski	GS
OL	69	Kade Martin	So
OL	70	Amos Talalele	So
OL	71	Kyrik Mason	GS
OT	74	Barry Walker	So
OL	75	Calib Perez	Sr
OL	77	Keyon Cox	Jr
OL	78	Nelson Ramirez	Sr
OL	79	Samuel Riddy	Jr
WR	80	Malik Muhammad	So
WR	83	Levi Brayton	Fr
WR	84	Lamar White	So
TE	85	Antonio Ferguson	Jr
TE	87	Sean Persson	So

Defense

Pos.	#	Name	Class
DB	0	Jotavian Pierce	Fr
DB	1	Darrell Sweeting	Jr
DB	2	Guylijah Theodule	Jr
LB	3	Ike Esonwune	Jr
DB	4	Draden Fullbright	Fr
CB	5	Delvon Gulley	Jr
OLB	5	Marlin Dean	GS
DB	6	Que Billingsley	Jr
OLB	7	Blanche Gold	Sr
DT	8	Nigel Tate	GS
DL	9	Noah Nelson	Sr
DB	10	Kris Wokomah	So
DB	11	Anta'Veon McKenzie	So
DB	12	Elijah Pratt	Fr
DB	13	Jeremiah Jordan	Sr
LB	14	Mantrez Walker	Fr
DL	15	Elijah Hall	Sr
CB	16	Isaiah Crozier	Jr
DL	17	Tylin Jackson	Jr
LB	19	Malachi Character	Fr
LB	21	Shaun Myers	GS
DB	22	Courage Ugochukwu	Sr
DB	23	Mykale Hrabowski	Fr
DB	24	Diezel Wilkinson	Jr
DB	25	Jaylen Thompson	So
LB	26	Gage Messick	Sr
LB	32	Colby Archie	Jr
LB	33	Braden Sullivan	Jr
LB	35	Muaaz Byard	Sr
CB	36	Julius Lane Jr.	Fr
S	37	Love Kirby	So
LB	43	Braxtyn Davies	Fr
LB	48	Phillip Davison Jr.	So
LB	49	Jacoby Bridges	So
DL	52	Sterling Sanders	Fr
DT	54	Kyle Mosley	So
DE	56	Myles Cook	So
DE	58	J'Quan Mason	So
DE	59	Chris Burge	So
DL	89	Rod Orr Jr.	GS
DL	90	Chris Spencer	Sr
DL	95	Cam Cunningham	Sr
DL	99	Raymond Macias	So

Special teams

Pos.	#	Name	Class
P	32	Badger Hargett	Jr
K	35	Owen Simpson	So
K	39	Jonah Delange	Sr
LS	46	Evan Bishop	Jr

Head coach

- Alex Mortensen

Coordinators/assistant coaches

- Lyle Henley – Assistant head coach/director of sports performance
- Todd Grantham – Defensive coordinator
- John Jones – Special teams coordinator/defensive ends
- Danny Mitchell – Quarterbacks
- Hindley Brigham – Running backs
- Matt McCants – Offensive line
- Gordon Steele – Run game coordinator/offensive line
- Kevin Garver – Wide receivers/pass game coordinator
- Luke Godsey – Assistant quarterbacks coach
- Reilly Jeffers – Tight ends/recruiting coordinator - offense
- Sam Mills III – Defensive line
- Brent Vieselmeyer – Secondary
- Lionel Stokes – Cornerbacks
- Nigel Madison – Inside linebackers
- Anthony Marciano – Assistant inside linebackers coach
- Corbin Grantham – Assistant defensive backs coach
- Ryan McNamara – Safeties
- Jack Henninger – Quality control – offense
- Zach Peterson – Quality control – offense
- Spencer Duncan – Quality control – defense
- Charlie Eger – Quality control – offense
- Bryant Novick – Assistant strength and conditioning coach
- Santonio Jones – Strength and conditioning
- Rip Scherer – Consultant to head coach

Legend

- (C) Team captain
- (S) Suspended
- (I) Ineligible
- Injured
- Redshirt

Roster

== Game summaries ==
=== at Illinois ===
UAB Blazers (0–0) at Illinois Fighting Illini (0–0) – Game summary

Quarter	1	2	3	4	Total
Blazers	3	10	3	7	23
Fighting Illini	14	7	7	14	42

at Gies Memorial Stadium • Champaign, Illinois

- Date: September 3
- Game time: 8:00 p.m. CDT
- Game weather: Clear • Temperature: 82 °F (28 °C) • Wind: S at 4 miles per hour (6.4 km/h)
- Game attendance: 52,673
- Referee: Jason Nickelby
- TV announcers (BTN): Mark Followill, Rhett Lewis and Caroline Hendershot

Game information

First quarter

- ILL – Collin Dixon 18-yard pass from Katin Houser (Ethan Moczulski kick), 7:55. Fighting Illini 7–0. Drive: 3 plays, 30 yards, 1:03.
- UAB – Jonah Delange 26-yard field goal, 2:24. Fighting Illini 7–3. Drive: 12 plays, 67 yards, 5:31.
- ILL – Ca'Lil Valentine 51-yard run (Ethan Moczulski kick), 1:18. Fighting Illini 14–3. Drive: 3 plays, 75 yards, 1:06.

Second quarter

- UAB – Jonah Delange 23-yard field goal, 5:50. Fighting Illini 14–6. Drive: 6 plays, 27 yards, 3:23.
- UAB – Roderick Robinson II 10-yard pass from Ryder Burton (Jonah Delange kick), 0:18. Fighting Illini 14–13. Drive: 10 plays, 50 yards, 2:45.
- ILL – Ty Robinson 54-yard pass from Katin Houser (Ethan Moczulski kick), 0:00. Fighting Illini 21–13. Drive: 3 plays, 66 yards, 0:13.

Third quarter

- ILL – Collin Dixon 14-yard pass from Katin Houser (Ethan Moczulski kick), 10:15. Fighting Illini 28–13. Drive: 11 plays, 75 yards, 4:45.
- UAB – Jonah Delange 35-yard field goal, 3:58. Fighting Illini 28–16. Drive: 11 plays, 58 yards, 6:17.

Fourth quarter

- ILL – Katin Houser 6-yard run (Ethan Moczulski kick), 12:25. Fighting Illini 35–16. Drive: 13 plays, 75 yards, 6:33.
- ILL – Ismael Kante 59-yard interception return (Ethan Moczulski kick), 5:48. Fighting Illini 42–16.
- UAB – Ryder Burton 5-yard run (Jonah Delange kick), 0:09. Fighting Illini 42–23. Drive: 12 plays, 75 yards, 5:39.

Statistics	UAB	ILL
First downs	24	17
Plays–yards	79–413	43–332
Rushes–yards	48–194	26–150
Passing yards	219	182
Passing: comp–att–int	18–31–1	13–17–0
Turnovers	1	0
Time of possession	41:03	18:57

Team	Category	Player	Statistics
UAB	Passing	Ryder Burton	18/31, 219 yards, TD, INT
UAB	Rushing	Roderick Robinson II	14 carries, 59 yards
UAB	Receiving	CJ Smith	2 receptions, 57 yards
Illinois	Passing	Katin Houser	13/17, 182 yards, 3 TD
Illinois	Rushing	Ca'Lil Valentine	11 carries, 88 yards, TD
Illinois	Receiving	Collin Dixon	6 receptions, 70 yards, 2 TD

=== Louisiana–Monroe ===
Louisiana–Monroe Warhawks (0–1) at UAB Blazers (0–1) – Game summary

Quarter	1	2	3	4	Total
Warhawks	7	10	3	0	20
Blazers	0	10	3	13	26

at Protective Stadium • Birmingham, Alabama

- Date: September 12
- Game time: 2:30 p.m. CDT
- Game weather: Sunny • Temperature: 91 °F (33 °C) • Wind: W at 5 miles per hour (8.0 km/h)
- Game attendance: 21,153
- Referee: Steven Anderson
- TV announcers (ESPN+): Mike Morgan and Kenechi Udeze

Game information

First quarter

- ULM – CJ Phillip 1-yard run (Abram Murray kick), 5:09. Warhawks 7–0. Drive: 12 plays, 57 yards, 5:45.

Second quarter

- UAB – Jonah Delange 41-yard field goal, 14:11. Warhawks 7–3. Drive: 13 plays, 52 yards, 5:58.
- ULM – Austin Carlisle 7-yard run (Abram Murray kick), 10:58. Warhawks 14–3. Drive: 7 plays, 75 yards, 3:13.
- UAB – Bam McReynolds 27-yard run (Jonah Delange kick), 6:45. Warhawks 14–10. Drive: 9 plays, 75 yards, 4:13.
- ULM – Abram Murray 32-yard field goal, 0:00. Warhawks 17–10. Drive: 4 plays, 4 yards, 1:25.

Third quarter

- ULM – Abram Murray 24-yard field goal, 10:24. Warhawks 20–10. Drive: 11 plays, 59 yards, 4:36.
- UAB – Jonah Delange 45-yard field goal, 7:00. Warhawks 20–13. Drive: 9 plays, 56 yards, 3:18.

Fourth quarter

- UAB – Jonah Delange 34-yard field goal, 13:32. Warhawks 20–16. Drive: 14 plays, 63 yards, 6:03.
- UAB – EJ Reid 43-yard pass from Ryder Burton (Jonah Delange kick), 9:34. Blazers 23–20. Drive: 4 plays, 53 yards, 2:50.
- UAB – Jonah Delange 42-yard field goal, 1:10. Blazers 26–20. Drive: 11 plays, 41 yards, 4:40.

Statistics	ULM	UAB
First downs	19	23
Plays–yards	63–257	68–381
Rushes–yards	43–201	52–266
Passing yards	56	115
Passing: comp–att–int	10–20–1	8–16–1
Turnovers	1	2
Time of possession	28:07	31:53

Team	Category	Player	Statistics
Louisiana–Monroe	Passing	Austin Carlisle	10/19, 56 yards, INT
Louisiana–Monroe	Rushing	Austin Carlisle	17 carries, 93 yards, TD
Louisiana–Monroe	Receiving	Marcellus Jackson	3 receptions, 21 yards
UAB	Passing	Ryder Burton	8/16, 115 yards, TD, INT
UAB	Rushing	Rod Robinson II	21 carries, 114 yards
UAB	Receiving	EJ Reid	4 receptions, 65 yards, TD

=== at Louisiana ===
UAB Blazers (1–1) at Louisiana Ragin' Cajuns (1–1) – Game summary

Quarter	1	2	3	4	Total
Blazers	0	7	0	7	14
Ragin' Cajuns	7	14	0	0	21

at Our Lady of Lourdes Stadium • Lafayette, Louisiana

- Date: September 19
- Game time: 7:00 p.m. CDT
- Game weather: Clear • Temperature: 90 °F (32 °C) • Wind: SE at 4 miles per hour (6.4 km/h)
- Game attendance: 18,216
- Referee: Edwin Lee
- TV announcers (ESPN+): Dan McDonald (play-by-play) and Eric Mouton (analyst)

Game information

First quarter

- LA – Steven Blanco 1-yard run (Tony Sterner kick), 8:52. Ragin' Cajuns 7–0. Drive: 13 plays, 80 yards, 6:01.

Second quarter

- LA – Lunch Winfield 9-yard run (Tony Sterner kick), 14:51. Ragin' Cajuns 14–0. Drive: 7 plays, 40 yards, 2:21.
- UAB – Chris Burge 13-yard fumble return (Jonah Delange kick), 7:56. Ragin' Cajuns 14–7. Drive: 1 play, -21 yards, 0:14.
- LA – Lunch Winfield 11-yard run (Tony Sterner kick), 0:44. Ragin' Cajuns 21–7. Drive: 7 plays, 75 yards, 1:09.

Fourth quarter

- UAB – Nate Rogers 11-yard run (Jonah Delange kick), 8:59. Ragin' Cajuns 21–14. Drive: 2 plays, 13 yards, 0:39.

Statistics	UAB	LA
First downs	11	21
Plays–yards	58-218	72-335
Rushes–yards	31-74	53-225
Passing yards	144	110
Passing: comp–att–int	15-27-1	14-19-0
Time of possession	24:37	35:23

Team	Category	Player	Statistics
UAB	Passing	Ryder Burton	15/25, 144 yards, INT
UAB	Rushing	Rod Robinson II	13 carries, 52 yards
UAB	Receiving	Ty Mims	4 receptions, 57 yards
Louisiana	Passing	Lunch Winfield	15/20, 110 yards
Louisiana	Rushing	Lunch Winfield	19 carries, 91 yards, 2 TDs
Louisiana	Receiving	Landon Strother	5 receptions, 41 yards

=== Navy ===
Navy Midshipmen (1–1) at UAB Blazers (1–2) – Game summary

Quarter	1	2	Total
Midshipmen			0
Blazers			0

at Protective Stadium • Birmingham, Alabama

- Date: September 25
- Game time: 6:00 p.m. CDT
- TV announcers (ESPN): Anish Shroff, Andre Ware and Morgan Uber

Statistics	NAVY	UAB
First downs		
Plays–yards		
Rushes–yards		
Passing yards		
Passing: comp–att–int		
Time of possession		

Team	Category	Player	Statistics
Navy	Passing		
Navy	Rushing		
Navy	Receiving		
UAB	Passing		
UAB	Rushing		
UAB	Receiving		

=== Samford (FCS) ===
Samford Bulldogs (1–3) at UAB Blazers (2–2) – Game summary

Quarter	1	2	Total
Bulldogs (FCS)			0
Blazers			0

at Protective Stadium • Birmingham, Alabama

- Date: October 3
- Game time: 2:30 p.m. CDT
- TV: ESPN+

Statistics	SAM	UAB
First downs		
Plays–yards		
Rushes–yards		
Passing yards		
Passing: comp–att–int		
Time of possession		

Team	Category	Player	Statistics
Samford	Passing		
Samford	Rushing		
Samford	Receiving		
UAB	Passing		
UAB	Rushing		
UAB	Receiving		

=== at Memphis (Battle for the Bones) ===
UAB Blazers (3–2) at Memphis Tigers (4–1) – Game summary

Quarter	1	2	Total
Blazers			0
Tigers			0

at Simmons Bank Liberty Stadium • Memphis, Tennessee

- Date: October 10
- Game time: TBD

Statistics	UAB	MEM
First downs		
Plays–yards		
Rushes–yards		
Passing yards		
Passing: comp–att–int		
Time of possession		

Team	Category	Player	Statistics
UAB	Passing		
UAB	Rushing		
UAB	Receiving		
Memphis	Passing		
Memphis	Rushing		
Memphis	Receiving		

=== East Carolina ===
East Carolina Pirates (3–2) at UAB Blazers (3–3) – Game summary

Quarter	1	2	Total
Pirates			0
Blazers			0

at Protective Stadium • Birmingham, Alabama

- Date: October 15
- Game time: 6:30 p.m. CDT
- TV: ESPN/ESPN2

Statistics	ECU	UAB
First downs		
Plays–yards		
Rushes–yards		
Passing yards		
Passing: comp–att–int		
Time of possession		

Team	Category	Player	Statistics
East Carolina	Passing		
East Carolina	Rushing		
East Carolina	Receiving		
UAB	Passing		
UAB	Rushing		
UAB	Receiving		

=== at South Florida ===
UAB Blazers (4–3) at South Florida Bulls (5–2) – Game summary

Quarter	1	2	Total
Blazers			0
Bulls			0

at Raymond James Stadium • Tampa, Florida

- Date: October 31
- Game time: TBD

Statistics	UAB	USF
First downs		
Plays–yards		
Rushes–yards		
Passing yards		
Passing: comp–att–int		
Time of possession		

Team	Category	Player	Statistics
UAB	Passing		
UAB	Rushing		
UAB	Receiving		
South Florida	Passing		
South Florida	Rushing		
South Florida	Receiving		

=== Charlotte ===
Charlotte 49ers (1–7) at UAB Blazers (4–4) – Game summary

Quarter	1	2	Total
49ers			0
Blazers			0

at Protective Stadium • Birmingham, Alabama

- Date: November 7
- Game time: TBD

Statistics	CLT	UAB
First downs		
Plays–yards		
Rushes–yards		
Passing yards		
Passing: comp–att–int		
Time of possession		

Team	Category	Player	Statistics
Charlotte	Passing		
Charlotte	Rushing		
Charlotte	Receiving		
UAB	Passing		
UAB	Rushing		
UAB	Receiving		

=== at Temple ===
UAB Blazers (5–4) at Temple Owls (2–7) – Game summary

Quarter	1	2	Total
Blazers			0
Owls			0

at Lincoln Financial Field • Philadelphia, Pennsylvania

- Date: November 14
- Game time: TBD

Statistics	UAB	TEM
First downs		
Plays–yards		
Rushes–yards		
Passing yards		
Passing: comp–att–int		
Time of possession		

Team	Category	Player	Statistics
UAB	Passing		
UAB	Rushing		
UAB	Receiving		
Temple	Passing		
Temple	Rushing		
Temple	Receiving		

=== UTSA ===
UTSA Roadrunners (8–2) at UAB Blazers (6–4) – Game summary

Quarter	1	2	Total
Roadrunners			0
Blazers			0

at Protective Stadium • Birmingham, Alabama

- Date: November 21
- Game time: TBD

Statistics	UTSA	UAB
First downs		
Plays–yards		
Rushes–yards		
Passing yards		
Passing: comp–att–int		
Time of possession		

Team	Category	Player	Statistics
UTSA	Passing		
UTSA	Rushing		
UTSA	Receiving		
UAB	Passing		
UAB	Rushing		
UAB	Receiving		

=== at North Texas ===
UAB Blazers (6–5) at North Texas Mean Green (7–4) – Game summary

Quarter	1	2	Total
Blazers			0
Mean Green			0

at DATCU Stadium • Denton, Texas

- Date: November 28
- Game time: TBD

Statistics	UAB	UNT
First downs		
Plays–yards		
Rushes–yards		
Passing yards		
Passing: comp–att–int		
Time of possession		

Team	Category	Player	Statistics
UAB	Passing		
UAB	Rushing		
UAB	Receiving		
North Texas	Passing		
North Texas	Rushing		
North Texas	Receiving		
