= 2026 South Alabama Jaguars football team =

American college football season

2026 South Alabama Jaguars football
- Conference: Sun Belt Conference
- West Division
- Record: 6–5 (4–3 Sun Belt)
- Head coach: Major Applewhite (3rd season)
- Defensive coordinator: Todd Orlando (1st season)
- Co-defensive coordinator: Jason Washington (2nd season)
- Home stadium: Hancock Whitney Stadium

2026 Sun Belt Conference football standings
	Conf.			Overall
Team	W		L	W		L
East Division
Georgia Southern	6	–	1	7	–	4
James Madison	5	–	2	8	–	3
Appalachian State	4	–	3	7	–	4
Coastal Carolina	3	–	4	4	–	7
Marshall	3	–	4	6	–	5
Georgia State	2	–	5	5	–	6
Old Dominion	2	–	5	3	–	8
West Division
Louisiana Tech xy	7	–	0	9	–	2
Louisiana	5	–	2	8	–	3
South Alabama	4	–	3	6	–	5
Arkansas State	2	–	5	4	–	7
Troy	2	–	5	4	–	7
Southern Miss	2	–	5	3	–	8
Louisiana–Monroe	2	–	5	2	–	9
Championship: TBD vs. Louisiana Tech
$ – Conference champion; x – Division champion/co-champions; y – Championship game participant; As of November 22, 2026; Rankings from AP poll

The 2026 South Alabama Jaguars football team is representing the University of South Alabama as they are a member of the Sun Belt Conference during the 2026 NCAA Division I FBS football season. They are led by third-year head coach Major Applewhite and also will play their home games at Hancock Whitney Stadium in Mobile, Alabama.

== Preseason ==
=== Media poll ===
In the Sun Belt preseason coaches' poll, the Jaguars were picked to finish sixth place in the West division.

Running back Keenan Phillips, offensive linemen Ethan Hubbard, Kenton Jerido and wide receiver Anthony Eager were awarded to be in the preseason All-Sun Belt second team offense, respectively.

== Schedule ==
The football schedule was announced on March 13, 2026.

Date	Time	Opponent	Site	TV	Result	Attendance
September 5	6:00 p.m.	Southeastern Louisiana*	Hancock Whitney Stadium; Mobile, AL	ESPN+	W 39–14	15,087
September 12	6:00 p.m.	at Tulane*	Yulman Stadium; New Orleans, LA	ESPN+	L 24–28	24,323
September 19	6:00 p.m.	Ohio*	Hancock Whitney Stadium; Mobile, AL	ESPN+	W 41–36	15,232
September 26	11:45 a.m.	at Kentucky*	Kroger Field; Lexington, KY	SECN	L 21–45	61,127
October 3	6:00 p.m.	Louisiana–Monroe^{†}	Hancock Whitney Stadium; Mobile, AL	ESPN+	W 52–35	12,800
October 8	6:30 p.m.	at Arkansas State	Centennial Bank Stadium; Jonesboro, AR	ESPN2	W 56–49	14,237
October 20	6:30 p.m.	at Marshall	Joan C. Edwards Stadium; Huntington, WV	ESPN2	L 13–20	21,904
October 31	2:00 p.m.	Louisiana Tech	Hancock Whitney Stadium; Mobile, AL	ESPN+	L 20–35	13,078
November 7	4:00 p.m.	at Louisiana	Cajun Field; Lafayette, LA	ESPN+	L 26–28	14,194
November 14	6:00 p.m.	Troy	Hancock Whitney Stadium; Mobile, AL (Battle for the Belt)	ESPN+	W 27–14	22,269
November 21	3:00 p.m.	at Southern Miss	M. M. Roberts Stadium; Hattiesburg, MS	ESPN+	W 40–35	27,608
November 27	2:00 p.m.	Appalachian State	Hancock Whitney Stadium; Mobile, AL	ESPN+		
*Non-conference game; ^{†}Homecoming; All times are in Central time

== Personnel ==
=== Transfers ===
Outgoing
Player	Position	New school
Nehemiah Chandler	CB	Florida State
Ed Smith IV	DL	Tulane
Malachi Preciado	IOL	Tulsa
RJ Moss Jr.	DL	FIU
Jeremy Scott	WR	TCU
Nathan Jennings	DL	FIU
Ty Goodwill	S	Cincinnati
Achilles Woods	DL	LSU
Dalton Hughes	LB	Tulane
Janier Armstead	DL	Sacred Heart
Kenton Jerido	IOL	Withdrawn
Hamilton DiBoyan	K	Austin Peay
Dominic Wiseman	DL	Kentucky
Wesley Miller	S	FIU
Blayne Myrick	LB	Miami (OH)
Tyler Thomas	EDGE	Kentucky
Trent Thomas	TE	Tennessee
Asher Hale	IOL	Baylor
Brec Long	TE	North Texas
Jordan Davis	OT	UCLA
Leavy Johnson	IOL	North Alabama
Adrian Griffin	DL	Alabama A&M
Brian Dillard	CB	Unknown
Ni Mansell	IOL	Unknown
Tywon Wray Jr.	S	Northwestern State
Ti Mims	WR	Unknown
Bubba Thompson	QB	West Florida
Brayden Ramey	OT	Unknown
Davaris Pilcher	CB	Delta State
Noah Boyd	OL	Pearl River CC
Saivion Kenon	CB	Unknown

Incoming
Player	Position	Previous school
Shalik Hubbard	IOL	Monmouth
Masey Lewis	EDGE	McNeese
Everett Hunter	TE	Nicholls
Jaylen Moson	CB	Utah
Peyton Argent	K	South Carolina
D.J. Moore	S	Georgia Tech
Andrew Hines	DL	Eastern Kentucky
Khayree Lee Jr.	IOL	LSU
Dylan Chiedo	EDGE	Furman
Seidrion Langston	LB	Louisiana–Monroe
Dylan Freebury	K	Colorado State
Jerry Horne	QB	Arkansas State
Diego Camboia	OL	Mississippi Valley State
Miguel Camboia	WR	Mississippi Valley State
Christian Ross	EDGE	Holy Cross
Cam McFarlin	TE	Arkansas Tech
Max Roth	K	Lincoln (MO)
Anthony Jeffery	RB	Kent State
Terry Kirksey Jr.	LB	Arkansas State

=== Recruiting class ===
College recruiting (2026)
Name	Hometown	School	Height	Weight	40^{‡}	Commit date
Xavious "Xae" Anderson; LB	Hogansville, GA	Callaway HS	6 ft 1 in (1.85 m)	215 lb (98 kg)	–	Dec 3, 2025
Xavious "Xae" Anderson; LB	Recruit ratings: 247Sports: ESPN: (74)					
Deon Callins; DB	Birmingham, AL	Clay-Chalkville HS	5 ft 11 in (1.80 m)	180 lb (82 kg)	–	Dec 3, 2025
Deon Callins; DB	Recruit ratings: 247Sports: ESPN: (74)					
Elliott Chaney; OL	Oxford, MS	Oxford HS	6 ft 5 in (1.96 m)	285 lb (129 kg)	–	Dec 3, 2025
Elliott Chaney; OL	Recruit ratings: 247Sports: ESPN: (72)					
Lavonte Cole; RB	Thomasville, GA	Thomasville HS	5 ft 11 in (1.80 m)	190 lb (86 kg)	–	Dec 3, 2025
Lavonte Cole; RB	Recruit ratings: 247Sports: ESPN: (76)					
Trakarris Collier; DB	Mobile, AL	Mary G. Montgomery HS	6 ft 0 in (1.83 m)	180 lb (82 kg)	–	Dec 5, 2025
Trakarris Collier; DB	Recruit ratings: 247Sports: ESPN: (73)					
Tyray Darensburg; LB	Chalmette, LA	Chalmette HS	6 ft 0 in (1.83 m)	205 lb (93 kg)	–	Dec 3, 2025
Tyray Darensburg; LB	Recruit ratings: 247Sports: ESPN: (73)					
Teryn Green; S	Vicksburg, MS	Hartfield Academy	6 ft 0 in (1.83 m)	195 lb (88 kg)	–	Dec 3, 2025
Teryn Green; S	Recruit ratings: 247Sports: ESPN: (73)					
Zech Hall; LB	Havana, FL	Gadsden County HS	6 ft 2 in (1.88 m)	200 lb (91 kg)	–	Dec 3, 2025
Zech Hall; LB	Recruit ratings: 247Sports: ESPN: (74)					
Rodney Hunter; DL	Memphis, TN	Whitehaven HS; Mississippi Gulf Coast CC	6 ft 4 in (1.93 m)	290 lb (130 kg)	–	Dec 3, 2025
Rodney Hunter; DL	Recruit ratings: 247Sports: ESPN: (71)					
Brayden Hurst; DL	Ponchatoula, LA	Ponchatoula HS	6 ft 2 in (1.88 m)	275 lb (125 kg)	–	Dec 3, 2025
Brayden Hurst; DL	Recruit ratings: 247Sports: ESPN: (73)					
Taylor Jacobs Jr. QB	Tallahassee, FL	Lincoln HS	6 ft 1 in (1.85 m)	185 lb (84 kg)	–	Dec 3, 2025
Taylor Jacobs Jr. QB	Recruit ratings: 247Sports: ESPN: (73)					
Tomareo Johnson; S	Pascagoula, MS	Pascagoula HS	6 ft 2 in (1.88 m)	190 lb (86 kg)	–	Dec 3, 2025
Tomareo Johnson; S	Recruit ratings: 247Sports: ESPN: (76)					
Brody Jones; WR	Fairhope, AL	St. Michael Catholic HS	5 ft 10 in (1.78 m)	163 lb (74 kg)	–	Jun 19, 2025
Brody Jones; WR	Recruit ratings: 247Sports: ESPN: (74)					
Artem Korchagin; OL	Thomasville, GA	Thomas County Central HS	6 ft 4 in (1.93 m)	315 lb (143 kg)	–	Dec 5, 2025
Artem Korchagin; OL	Recruit ratings: 247Sports: ESPN: (74)					
Khatori Marion; WR	Mobile, AL	Baker HS	5 ft 11 in (1.80 m)	170 lb (77 kg)	–	Dec 3, 2025
Khatori Marion; WR	Recruit ratings: 247Sports: ESPN: (73)					
Julius Mathis; TE	Lexington, MS	Holmes County Central HS	6 ft 4 in (1.93 m)	215 lb (98 kg)	–	Dec 4, 2025
Julius Mathis; TE	Recruit ratings: 247Sports: ESPN: (74)					
Jordan Morris; TE	Apache Junction, AZ	Red Mountain HS; Butler CC	6 ft 4 in (1.93 m)	225 lb (102 kg)	–	Dec 3, 2025
Jordan Morris; TE	Recruit ratings: 247Sports: ESPN: (71)					
Demetress Mosley; LB	Pensacola, FL	Pine Forest HS	6 ft 3 in (1.91 m)	210 lb (95 kg)	–	Dec 3, 2025
Demetress Mosley; LB	Recruit ratings: 247Sports:					
Aydan Newell; OL	Brandon, MS	Brandon HS	6 ft 3 in (1.91 m)	305 lb (138 kg)	–	Dec 5, 2025
Aydan Newell; OL	Recruit ratings: 247Sports:					
Kam'Ron Robinson; S	Winona, MS	Winona HS; Holmes CC	6 ft 0 in (1.83 m)	180 lb (82 kg)	–	Dec 3, 2025
Kam'Ron Robinson; S	Recruit ratings: 247Sports: ESPN: (73)					
Aaden Shamburger; QB	Spanish Fort, AL	Spanish Fort HS	6 ft 2 in (1.88 m)	170 lb (77 kg)	–	Dec 3, 2025
Aaden Shamburger; QB	Recruit ratings: 247Sports: ESPN: (74)					
Antwon Thomas; DL	Cleveland, MS	Cleveland Central HS	6 ft 6 in (1.98 m)	230 lb (100 kg)	–	Dec 5, 2025
Antwon Thomas; DL	Recruit ratings: 247Sports:					
Cam'Ron Thompson; OL	Savannah, GA	Jenkins HS	6 ft 3 in (1.91 m)	300 lb (140 kg)	–	Dec 5, 2025
Cam'Ron Thompson; OL	Recruit ratings: 247Sports: ESPN: (77)					
Camen Upshaw; DB	Perry, FL	Lowndes HS	6 ft 0 in (1.83 m)	200 lb (91 kg)	–	Dec 3, 2025
Camen Upshaw; DB	Recruit ratings: 247Sports: ESPN: (72)					
Devon Waller; OL	Detroit, MI	Sandy Creek HS; Coffeyville CC	6 ft 3 in (1.91 m)	305 lb (138 kg)	–	Jan 14, 2026
Devon Waller; OL	Recruit ratings: 247Sports:					
Andrew Washburn; DL	Mooresville, NC	Mooresville HS; Southwest Mississippi CC	6 ft 4 in (1.93 m)	277 lb (126 kg)	–	Jan 20, 2026
Andrew Washburn; DL	Recruit ratings: 247Sports:					
Jarvis Washington; WR	Baton Rouge, LA	The Dunham School	6 ft 4 in (1.93 m)	185 lb (84 kg)	–	Dec 3, 2025
Jarvis Washington; WR	Recruit ratings: 247Sports: ESPN: (73)					
Tre Webb; CB	New Orleans, LA	Dr. King Charter HS; Copiah–Lincoln CC	6 ft 0 in (1.83 m)	170 lb (77 kg)	–	Dec 3, 2025
Tre Webb; CB	Recruit ratings: 247Sports: ESPN: (75)					
Dominic White; WR	Bessemer, AL	Minor HS	6 ft 1 in (1.85 m)	180 lb (82 kg)	–	Dec 3, 2025
Dominic White; WR	Recruit ratings: 247Sports: ESPN: (75)					
Tyler Wiley; DL	Oxford, MS	Lafayette HS	6 ft 4 in (1.93 m)	275 lb (125 kg)	–	Feb 4, 2026
Tyler Wiley; DL	Recruit ratings: 247Sports:					
Colby Williams; CB	Plainfield, IL	Plainfield Central HS; Snow College	6 ft 0 in (1.83 m)	180 lb (82 kg)	–	Jan 19, 2026
Colby Williams; CB	Recruit ratings: 247Sports:					
Caleb Wynn; RB	Anniston, AL	Oxford HS	5 ft 11 in (1.80 m)	205 lb (93 kg)	–	Dec 3, 2025
Caleb Wynn; RB	Recruit ratings: 247Sports: ESPN: (74)					

=== Roster ===
2026 South Alabama Jaguars football team roster
Players
Coaches
Offense

Pos.	#	Name	Class
RB	0	PJ Martin	Jr
WR	1	Anthony Eager	Jr
WR	2	Jeremiah Jones-Thomas	So
RB	3	Keenan Phillips	Jr
QB	4	Bishop Davenport	Sr
WR	6	Micah Woods	GS
QB	7	Jared Hollins	So
WR	8	Noah Toster	Jr
TE	9	Rod Gibbs	Sr
WR	10	Khatori Marion	Fr
WR	11	Trae Stevenson	Fr
WR	12	Brendan Jenkins	Sr
WR	13	Jarvis Washington Jr.	Fr
TE	14	Maddox Lynch	Fr
QB	15	Taylor Jacobs Jr.	Fr
QB	16	Aaden Shamburger	Fr
RB	17	Anthony Jeffery	So
QB	18	Jerry Horne	Fr
WR	19	Jerrian Graham	So
RB	20	Lavonte Cole	Fr
RB	21	Trae'von Dunbar	So
RB	22	Caleb Wynn	Fr
WR	23	Dominic White	Fr
RB	24	Julyon Jordan	Fr
RB	26	Donovan Crow	Fr
WR	27	Tylen Campbell	Sr
TE	34	Cam McFarlin	So
OL	51	Diego Camboia	Jr
OL	52	Andre Woods	So
OL	56	Naol Andarge	Jr
OL	57	Shalik Hubbard	Sr
OL	58	Cam'Ron Thompson	Fr
OL	60	Devon Waller	Jr
OL	61	Julius Kidd	Sr
OL	62	Kyle Greak	Fr
OL	64	Jamal Siler	So
OL	66	Devin White	Fr
OL	67	Artem Korchagin Jr.	Fr
OL	68	Reese Osei-Wusu	Jr
OL	69	Kenton Jerido	Sr
OL	70	Elliott Chaney	Fr
OL	71	Jaylen Booker	So
OL	72	Ethan Hubbard	Jr
OL	73	Jamal Scott	Fr
OL	77	Kearius Bivens	Fr
OL	79	Eric Mahan	Fr
WR	81	Miguel Camboia	Sr
TE	82	Julius Mathis	Fr
TE	83	Everett Hunter	Sr
TE	84	Nate Forystek	Jr
WR	85	Brian Barnes	Jr
TE	87	Jordan Morris	Jr
TE	88	Owen Carlson	Fr
WR	89	Brandon Nolan	Fr

Defense

Pos.	#	Name	Class
S	1	DJ Moore	Sr
S	2	Jayvon Henderson	Sr
CB	3	Tre Webb III	Jr
S	4	Kohl Bradley	Fr
LB	6	Kaydon Degraffenreid	Jr
CB	7	Deuce Vance	Fr
S	8	Dallas Young	Jr
DL	9	Emmanuel Waller	Sr
LB	10	William Felton IV	So
LB	11	Parker Shattuck	Jr
CB	12	Jaylen Moson	Jr
S	13	Kam Robinson	Jr
S	14	Cole Blaylock	Jr
CB	15	Colby Williams	Jr
LB	16	Seidrion Langston	Sr
LB	17	Christian Ross	Sr
DL	18	Mase Lewis	Sr
CB	19	TJ Collier	Fr
LB	20	Tirrell Johnson Jr.	Sr
S	21	Deon Callins	Fr
LB	22	Caleb Dozier	So
CB	23	Cube Gurley	So
CB	24	Damyrion Darby	Jr
LB	25	Tre'Mon Henry	Jr
LB	26	Xavious Anderson Jr.	Fr
LB	27	Zechariah Hall	Fr
S	28	Tomareo Johnson Jr.	Fr
S	29	Kaleb Jackson	Jr
LB	30	Perry Hand	Fr
S	31	Dashaun Caffee	So
S	32	Camen Upshaw	Fr
LB	33	Tyray Darensburg	Fr
CB	34	Bradley Thomas	Sr
S	35	Matthew Laseter	So
S	36	Teryn Green	Fr
CB	37	Evan Jones	Fr
S	38	Braiden Cheshire	Fr
DL	39	Rodney Hunter	Jr
DL	41	Tyler Carter	So
LB	42	Dylan Chiedo	Jr
LB	43	Jacob Porco	So
LB	44	Donnie Arnold	So
LB	45	Demetress Mosley	Fr
LB	48	Jordan Williams	Jr
DL	49	Tre Brown	Jr
LB	53	Latrelle Latt	So
DL	56	Stephen Johnson	Jr
DL	75	Tyler Wiley	Fr
DL	80	Brayden Hurst	Fr
DL	85	Andrew Washburn	Sr
DL	90	E'Mauri Smiley	So
DL	93	Jeremiah Waldrond	Sr
DL	94	Andrew Hines	So

Special teams

Pos.	#	Name	Class
K	35	Davis Little	So
K	37	Dylan Freebury	Fr
K	38	Peyton Argent	Jr
P	40	Aleksi Pulkkinen	Sr
LS	44	Baxter Turner	Jr
LS	47	Grant Rountree	So
K/P	98	Christopher Aikman	Fr

Head coach

- Major Applewhite (Texas)

Coordinators/assistant coaches

- Todd Orlando (Wisconsin)
  Defensive coordinator / inside linebackers
- Tommy Perry (Texas A&M)
  Special teams coordinator
- Jason Washington (Texas State)
  Co-defensive coordinator / cornerbacks
- Tim Rattay (Louisiana Tech)
  Passing game coordinator / receivers
- Tre' Williams (Auburn)
  Outside linebackers
- Broderick Fobbs (Grambling State)
  Running backs
- Zach Crisler (Arkansas State)
  Quarterbacks
- Adam Mann (Huntington)
  Tight ends
- Bryant Ross (Alabama A&M)
  Offensive line
- Chris Achuff (Bloomsburg)
  Defensive line
- Tyson Kee (Southeastern (FL))
  Safeties
- Rod Grace (UT Martin)
  Director of strength & conditioning

Legend

- (C) Team captain
- (S) Suspended
- (I) Ineligible
- Injured
- Redshirt

Roster

== Game summaries ==
=== Southeastern Louisiana (FCS) ===
Southeastern Louisiana Lions (0–1) at South Alabama Jaguars (0–0) – Game summary

Quarter	1	2	3	4	Total
Lions (FCS)	7	0	7	0	14
Jaguars	19	3	10	7	39

at Hancock Whitney Stadium • Mobile, Alabama

- Date: September 5
- Game time: 6:00 p.m. CDT
- Game weather: Sunny
- Game attendance: 15,087
- Referee: Jeff Pruitt
- TV announcers (ESPN+): Pat Greenwood (play-by-play) and Brian Genard (analyst)

Game information

First quarter

- (13:19) USA – Brendan Jenkins 26-yard pass from Bishop Davenport, Davis Little kick (Drive: 5 plays, 55 yards, 1:33; South Alabama 7–0)
- (6:07) USA – Davis Little 35-yard field goal (Drive: 11 plays, 45 yards, 5:24; South Alabama 10–0)
- (4:59) USA – 0-yard safety (South Alabama 12–0)
- (2:38) USA – Trae'von Dunbar 1-yard run, Davis Little kick (Drive: 8 plays, 50 yards, 2:21; South Alabama 19–0)
- (1:16) SELA – Lonnie Shinn Jr. 12-yard pass from Kyle Lowe, Drew Talley kick (Drive: 4 plays, 76 yards, 1:16; South Alabama 19–7)

Second quarter

- (0:00) USA – Davis Little 30-yard field goal (Drive: 9 plays, 32 yards, 1:48; South Alabama 22–7)

Third quarter

- (12:46) SELA – Lonnie Shinn Jr. 7-yard pass from Kyle Lowe, Drew Talley kick (Drive: 4 plays, 65 yards, 2:14; South Alabama 22–14)
- (7:04) USA – Davis Little 26-yard field goal (Drive: 11 plays, 45 yards, 5:33; South Alabama 25–14)
- (4:06) USA – Bishop Davenport 2-yard run, Davis Little kick (Drive: 4 plays, 9 yards, 1:39; South Alabama 32–14)

Fourth quarter

- (9:02) USA – PJ Martin 3-yard run, Davis Little kick (Drive: 15 plays, 47 yards, 8:15; South Alabama 32–14)

Statistics	SELA	USA
First downs	11	27
Plays–yards	37–231	86–395
Rushes–yards	17–45	59–241
Passing yards	186	154
Passing: comp–att–int	12–20–2	18–27–0
Turnovers	2	0
Time of possession	19:51	40:09

Team	Category	Player	Statistics
Southeastern Louisiana	Passing	Kyle Lowe	12/20, 186 yards, 2 TD, 2 INT
Southeastern Louisiana	Rushing	Calvin Smith Jr.	8 carries, 38 yards
Southeastern Louisiana	Receiving	Chad Elzy	2 receptions, 70 yards
South Alabama	Passing	Bishop Davenport	18/27, 154 yards, TD
South Alabama	Rushing	PJ Martin	18 carries, 69 yards, TD
South Alabama	Receiving	Brendan Jenkins	5 receptions, 78 yards, TD

=== at Tulane ===
South Alabama Jaguars (1–0) at Tulane Green Wave (0–1) – Game summary

Quarter	1	2	3	4	Total
Jaguars	10	0	7	7	24
Green Wave	0	14	7	7	28

at Yulman Stadium • New Orleans, Louisiana

- Date: September 12
- Game time: 6:00 p.m. CDT
- Game weather: Cloudy • Temperature: 83 °F (28 °C) • Wind: SW 7 mph
- Game attendance: 24,323
- Referee: Reid Jackson
- TV announcers (ESPN+): Jack Benjamin, Henry Burris and Maria Trivelpiece

Game information

First quarter

- (8:03) USA – Davis Little 40-yard field goal (Drive: 11 plays, 63 yards, 5:00; South Alabama 3–0)
- (1:31) USA – PJ Martin 16-yard run, Davis Little kick (Drive: 6 plays, 73 yards, 2:32; South Alabama 10–0)

Second quarter

- (14:57) TULN – Johnnie Daniels 2-yard run, Jackson Courville kick (Drive: 4 plays, 65 yards, 1:34; South Alabama 10–7)
- (1:55) TULN – Johnnie Daniels 3-yard run, Jackson Courville kick (Drive: 7 plays, 95 yards, 3:36; Tulane 14–10)

Third quarter

- (12:17) USA – Anthony Eager 43-yard pass from Bishop Davenport, Davis Little kick (Drive: 5 plays, 92 yards, 2:41; South Alabama 17–14)
- (4:53) TULN – Jaylin Lucas 80-yard run, Jackson Courville kick (Drive: 2 plays, 80 yards, 0:18; Tulane 21–17)

Fourth quarter

- (11:49) USA – Brendan Jenkins 17-yard pass from Bishop Davenport, Davis Little kick (Drive: 12 plays, 70 yards, 7:58; South Alabama 24–21)
- (1:17) TULN – Destyn Hill 14-yard pass from Kadin Semonza, Jackson Courville kick (Drive: 7 plays, 78 yards, 3:22; Tulane 28–24)

Statistics	USA	TULN
First downs	26	13
Plays–yards	72–478	51–424
Rushes–yards	40–182	29–212
Passing yards	296	212
Passing: comp–att–int	22–32–0	14–22–0
Turnovers	0	0
Time of possession	37:40	22:20

Team	Category	Player	Statistics
South Alabama	Passing	Bishop Davenport	22/32, 296 yards, 2 TD
South Alabama	Rushing	PJ Martin	15 carries, 73 yards, TD
South Alabama	Receiving	Brendan Jenkins	9 receptions, 119 yards, TD
Tulane	Passing	Kadin Semonza	14/22, 212 yards, TD
Tulane	Rushing	Jaylin Lucas	11 carries, 214 yards, TD
Tulane	Receiving	Destyn Hill	4 receptions, 91 yards, TD

=== Ohio ===
Ohio Bobcats (1–1) at South Alabama Jaguars (1–1) – Game summary

Quarter	1	2	3	4	Total
Bobcats	7	0	14	15	36
Jaguars	14	10	7	10	41

at Hancock Whitney Stadium • Mobile, Alabama

- Date: September 19
- Game time: 6:00 p.m. CDT
- Game weather: Sunny
- Game attendance: 15,232
- Referee: Billy Williams
- TV announcers (ESPN+): Pat Greenwood (play-by-play) and Brian Genard (analyst)

Game information

First quarter

- (12:07) USA – Keenan Phillips 6-yard run, Davis Little kick (Drive: 7 plays, 75 yards, 2:53; South Alabama 7–0)
- (4:37) OHIO – Riley Neer 5-yard pass from Matt Vezza, Will Hryszko kick (Drive: 13 plays, 78 yards, 7:26; Tied 7–7)
- (1:39) USA – Rod Gibbs 34-yard pass from Jared Hollins, Davis Little kick (Drive: 6 plays, 75 yards, 2:58; South Alabama 14–7)

Second quarter

- (14:24) USA – Trae'von Dunbar 32-yard run, Davis Little kick (Drive: 2 plays, 36 yards, 0:29; South Alabama 21–7)
- (0:52) USA – Davis Little 32-yard field goal (Drive: 18 plays, 66 yards, 7:57; South Alabama 24–7)

Third quarter

- (13:59) OHIO – Victor Rosa 33-yard run, Will Hryszko kick (Drive: 2 plays, 41 yards, 0:50; South Alabama 24–14)
- (12:09) OHIO – Riley Neer 9-yard pass from Matt Vezza, Will Hryszko kick (Drive: 2 plays, 25 yards, 0:30; South Alabama 24–21)
- (8:05) USA – PJ Martin 1-yard run, Davis Little kick (Drive: 10 plays, 75 yards, 4:04; South Alabama 31–21)

Fourth quarter

- (8:21) USA – Trae'von Dunbar 5-yard run, Davis Little kick (Drive: 14 plays, 81 yards, 7:53; South Alabama 38–21)
- (5:20) OHIO – AJ Miller 10-yard pass from Levi Davis, AJ Miller pass (Drive: 9 plays, 63 yards, 2:51; South Alabama 38–29)
- (1:10) USA – Davis Little 21-yard field goal (Drive: 4 plays, 7 yards, 1:37; South Alabama 41–29)
- (0:00) OHIO – Dom Dorwart 21-yard pass from Levi Davis, Will Hryszko kick (Drive: 6 plays, 70 yards, 1:05; South Alabama 41–36)

Statistics	OHIO	USA
First downs	22	21
Plays–yards	59–387	70–458
Rushes–yards	28–153	50–266
Passing yards	234	192
Passing: comp–att–int	21–31–1	13–20–0
Turnovers	2	0
Time of possession	27:30	32:30

Team	Category	Player	Statistics
Ohio	Passing	Levi Davis	9/15, 121 yards, 2 TD
Ohio	Rushing	Victor Rosa	13 carries, 78 yards, TD
Ohio	Receiving	Dom Dorwart	5 receptions, 61 yards, TD
South Alabama	Passing	Jared Hollins	13/20, 192 yards, TD
South Alabama	Rushing	Keenan Phillips	18 carries, 116 yards, TD
South Alabama	Receiving	Jeremiah Jones-Thomas	6 receptions, 74 yards

=== at Kentucky ===
South Alabama Jaguars (2–1) at Kentucky Wildcats (2–1) – Game summary

Quarter	1	2	3	4	Total
Jaguars	0	21	0	0	21
Wildcats	7	17	7	14	45

at Kroger Field • Lexington, Kentucky

- Date: September 26
- Game time: 11:45 a.m. CDT
- Game weather: Sunny • Temperature: 72 °F (22 °C) • Wind: NE at 8 miles per hour (13 km/h)
- Game attendance: 61,127
- Referee: Jeff Heaser
- TV announcers (SECN): Dave Neal, Cole Cubelic and Tori Petry

Game information

First quarter

- (0:37) UK – CJ Baxter 3-yard run, Adam Zouagui kick (Drive: 10 plays, 73 yards, 5:44; Kentucky 7–0)

Second quarter

- (14:17) USA – PJ Martin 7-yard run, Davis Little kick (Drive: 3 plays, 15 yards, 0:27; Tied 7–7)
- (10:14) USA – Anthony Eager 36-yard pass from Jared Hollins, Davis Little kick (Drive: 3 plays, 57 yards, 1:05; South Alabama 14–7)
- (4:57) UK – Jovantae Barnes 7-yard run, Adam Zouagui kick (Drive: 11 plays, 76 yards, 5:11; Tied 14–14)
- (1:22) USA – Jeremiah Jones-Thomas 19-yard pass from Jared Hollins, Davis Little kick (Drive: 9 plays, 75 yards, 3:35; South Alabama 21–14)
- (1:12) UK – Jason Patterson 75-yard run, Adam Zouagui kick (Drive: 1 play, 75 yards, 0:10; Tied 21–21)
- (0:16) UK – Adam Zouagui 34-yard field goal (Drive: 4 plays, 5 yards, 0:49; Kentucky 24–21)

Third quarter

- (13:13) UK – Jason Patterson 15-yard run, Adam Zouagui kick (Drive: 4 plays, 75 yards, 1:47; Kentucky 31–21)

Fourth quarter

- (12:55) UK – Jason Patterson 2-yard run, Adam Zouagui kick (Drive: 6 plays, 69 yards, 3:12; Kentucky 38–21)
- (10:45) UK – Shane Carr 15-yard pass from Kenny Minchey, Adam Zouagui kick (Drive: 3 plays, 33 yards, 1:09; Kentucky 45–21)

Statistics	USA	UK
First downs	19	26
Plays–yards	74–354	68–567
Rushes–yards	31–88	42–390
Passing yards	266	177
Passing: comp–att–int	23–43–2	19–26–0
Turnovers	2	2
Time of possession	28:19	31:41

Team	Category	Player	Statistics
South Alabama	Passing	Jared Hollins	23/43, 266 yards, 2 TD, 2 INT
South Alabama	Rushing	PJ Martin	9 carries, 48 yards, TD
South Alabama	Receiving	Jeremiah Jones-Thomas	6 receptions, 91 yards, TD
Kentucky	Passing	Kenny Minchey	19/25, 177 yards, TD
Kentucky	Rushing	CJ Baxter	16 carries, 149 yards, TD
Kentucky	Receiving	Kenny Darby	3 receptions, 43 yards

=== Louisiana–Monroe ===
Louisiana–Monroe Warhawks (0–4) at South Alabama Jaguars (2–2) – Game summary

Quarter	1	2	3	4	Total
Warhawks	7	7	14	7	35
Jaguars	21	10	14	7	52

at Hancock Whitney Stadium • Mobile, Alabama

- Date: October 3
- Game time: 6:00 p.m. CDT
- Game weather: Sunny
- Game attendance: 12,800
- Referee: Bruce Austin
- TV announcers (ESPN+): Pat Greenwood (play-by-play) and Brian Genard (analyst)

Game information

First quarter

- (14:08) USA – Brendan Jenkins 27-yard pass from Jared Hollins, Davis Little kick (Drive: 2 plays, 75 yards, 0:52; South Alabama 7–0)
- (13:13) USA – Masey Lewis 21-yard fumble recovery, Davis Little kick (South Alabama 14–0)
- (9:22) ULM – Zach Palmer-Smith 31-yard run, Abram Murray kick (Drive: 8 plays, 75 yards, 3:51; South Alabama 14–7)
- (5:24) USA – Keenan Phillips 1-yard run, Davis Little kick (Drive: 8 plays, 75 yards, 3:58; South Alabama 21–7)

Second quarter

- (9:27) USA – PJ Martin 1-yard run, Davis Little kick (Drive: 18 plays, 86 yards, 8:44; South Alabama 28–7)
- (5:06) ULM – Aidan Armenta pass incomplete, Abram Murray kick (Drive: 9 plays, 75 yards, 4:21; South Alabama 28–14)
- (0:06) USA – Davis Little 37-yard field goal (Drive: 7 plays, 32 yards, 1:00; South Alabama 31–14)

Third quarter

- (11:42) USA – Anthony Eager 35-yard pass from Jared Hollins, Davis Little kick (Drive: 4 plays, 49 yards, 1:54; South Alabama 38–14)
- (8:21) ULM – Bryce Anderson 2-yard pass from Aidan Armenta, Abram Murray kick (Drive: 7 plays, 75 yards, 3:21; South Alabama 38–21)
- (6:54) USA – Anthony Eager 69-yard pass from Jared Hollins, Davis Little kick (Drive: 3 plays, 88 yards, 1:20; South Alabama 45–21)
- (2:53) ULM – Aidan Armenta 1-yard run, Abram Murray kick (Drive: 12 plays, 65 yards, 4:01; South Alabama 45–28)

Fourth quarter

- (2:31) USA – Trae'von Dunbar 32-yard run, Davis Little kick (Drive: 6 plays, 80 yards, 3:37; South Alabama 52–28)
- (0:53) ULM – Darrion Gilliam 9-yard pass from Aidan Armenta, Abram Murray kick (Drive: 7 plays, 75 yards, 1:38; South Alabama 52–35)

Statistics	ULM	USA
First downs	21	20
Plays–yards	69–442	65–570
Rushes–yards	28–87	46–249
Passing yards	355	321
Passing: comp–att–int	25–41–1	14–19–0
Time of possession	28:58	31:02

Team	Category	Player	Statistics
Louisiana–Monroe	Passing	Aidan Armenta	25/41, 355 yards, 2 TD, INT
Louisiana–Monroe	Rushing	Zach Palmer-Smith	8 carries, 54 yards, TD
Louisiana–Monroe	Receiving	Marcellus Jackson	5 receptions, 93 yards
South Alabama	Passing	Jared Hollins	14/19, 321 yards, 3 TD
South Alabama	Rushing	Trae'von Dunbar	12 carries, 91 yards, TD
South Alabama	Receiving	Anthony Eager	4 receptions, 168 yards, 2 TD

=== at Arkansas State ===
South Alabama Jaguars (3–2) at Arkansas State Red Wolves (2–3) – Game summary

Quarter	1	2	3	4	Total
Jaguars	14	20	15	7	56
Red Wolves	7	21	7	14	49

at Centennial Bank Stadium • Jonesboro, Arkansas

- Date: October 8
- Game time: 6:30 p.m. CDT
- Game weather: Sunny • Temperature: 83 °F (28 °C) • Wind: NE at 6 miles per hour (9.7 km/h)
- Game attendance: 14,237
- Referee: Jeremy Parker
- TV announcers (ESPN2): Dave Neal (play-by-play) and Cole Cubelic (analyst)

Game information

First quarter

- (7:21) USA – PJ Martin 6-yard run, Davis Little kick (Drive: 13 plays, 78 yards, 6:09; South Alabama 7–0)
- (1:44) ARST – Timothy Carter 1-yard run, Clune Van Andel kick (Drive: 11 plays, 80 yards, 5:33; Tied 7–7)
- (1:31) USA – Keenan Phillips 100-yard kickoff return, Davis Little kick (South Alabama 14–7)

Second quarter

- (12:56) ARST – Hunter Summers 19-yard pass from Trey Owens, Clune Van Andel kick (Drive: 7 plays, 86 yards, 3:30; Tied 14–14)
- (6:16) ARST – Timothy Carter 1-yard run, Clune Van Andel kick (Drive: 10 plays, 57 yards, 5:16; Arkansas State 21–14)
- (4:37) USA – Keenan Phillips 3-yard run, Davis Little kick (Drive: 4 plays, 74 yards, 1:39; Tied 21–21)
- (1:51) USA – Jared Hollins 3-yard run, Davis Little kick (Drive: 6 plays, 28 yards, 2:01; South Alabama 28–21)
- (1:29) USA – Jared Hollins 3-yard run (Drive: 2 plays, 12 yards, 0:09; South Alabama 34–21)
- (0:32) ARST – Hunter Summers 20-yard pass from Trey Owens, Clune Van Andel kick (Drive: 4 plays, 73 yards, 0:52; South Alabama 34–28)

Third quarter

- (13:29) USA – Keenan Phillips 23-yard run, Jared Hollins rush (Drive: 3 plays, 74 yards, 1:27; South Alabama 42–28)
- (4:36) USA – Rod Gibbs 7-yard pass from Jared Hollins, David Little kick (Drive: 6 plays, 26 yards, 3:29; South Alabama 49–28)
- (1:10) ARST – Solomon Baggett 4-yard pass from Trey Owens, Clune Van Andel kick (Drive: 9 plays, 75 yards, 3:26; South Alabama 49–35)

Fourth quarter

- (14:52) USA – Keenan Phillips 42-yard run, Davis Little kick (Drive: 4 plays, 75 yards, 1:18; South Alabama 56–35)
- (12:18) ARST – Jabari Bush 15-yard pass from Trey Owens, Clune Van Andel kick (Drive: 2 plays, 15 yards, 0:09; South Alabama 56–42)
- (6:51) ARST – Trey Owens 1-yard run, Clune Van Andel kick (Drive: 10 plays, 81 yards, 3:14; South Alabama 56–49)

Statistics	USA	ARST
First downs	21	31
Plays–yards	60–372	70–516
Rushes–yards	50–296	27–98
Passing yards	76	418
Passing: comp–att–int	6–10–0	32–43–2
Time of possession	28:39	31:21

Team	Category	Player	Statistics
South Alabama	Passing	Jared Hollins	6/10, 76 yards, TD
South Alabama	Rushing	Keenan Phillips	19 carries, 157 yards, 3 TD
South Alabama	Receiving	Brendan Jenkins	1 reception, 36 yards
Arkansas State	Passing	Trey Owens	32/43, 418 yards, 4 TD, 2 INT
Arkansas State	Rushing	Trey Owens	11 carries, 28 yards, TD
Arkansas State	Receiving	Hunter Summers	9 receptions, 145 yards, 2 TD

=== at Marshall ===
South Alabama Jaguars (4–2) at Marshall Thundering Herd (3–3) – Game summary

Quarter	1	2	3	4	Total
Jaguars	3	3	0	7	13
Thundering Herd	0	6	7	7	20

at Joan C. Edwards Stadium • Huntington, West Virginia

- Date: October 20
- Game time: 6:30 p.m. CDT
- Game weather: Sunny
- Game attendance: 21,904
- Referee: Scott Broadway
- TV announcers (ESPN2): Clay Matvick (play-by-play) and Rocky Boiman (analyst)

Game information

First quarter

- (1:54) USA – Davis Little 29 yard field goal (Drive: 9 plays, 70 yards, 4:57; South Alabama 3–0)

Second quarter

- (11:49) MRSH – Jorge Diaz Nicolas 47 yard goal (Drive: 12 plays, 46 yards, 5:05; Tied 3–3)
- (1:55) MRSH – Jorge Diaz Nicolas 48 yard goal (Drive: 7 plays, 21 yards, 2:42; Marshall 6–3)
- (0:00) USA – Davis Little 42 yard field goal (Drive: 12 plays, 31 yards, 1:49; Tied 6–6)

Third quarter

- (3:25) MRSH – Zion Turner 3 yard run, Jorge Diaz Nicolas kick (Drive: 6 plays, 55 yards, 2:48; Marshall 13–6)

Fourth quarter

- (4:38) USA – PJ Martin 19 yard run, Davis Little kick (Drive: 13 plays, 80 yards, 6:00; Tied 13–13)
- (1:49) MRSH – Judah Price 5 yard run, Jorge Diaz Nicolas kick (Drive: 8 plays, 75 yards, 2:49; Marshall 20–13)

Statistics	USA	MRSH
First downs	19	20
Plays–yards	75–326	66–328
Rushes–yards	42–178	33–147
Passing yards	148	181
Passing: comp–att–int	12–33–1	21–33–0
Turnovers	1	0
Time of possession	30:38	29:22

Team	Category	Player	Statistics
South Alabama	Passing	Jared Hollis	12/33, 148 yards, INT
South Alabama	Rushing	Keenan Phillips	16 carries, 70 yards
South Alabama	Receiving	Brendan Jenkins	4 receptions, 75 yards
Marshall	Passing	Zion Turner	21/33, 181 yards
Marshall	Rushing	Khalil Wilkins	8 carries, 69 yards
Marshall	Receiving	Toby Payne	7 receptions, 69 yards

=== Louisiana Tech ===
Louisiana Tech Bulldogs (5–2) at South Alabama Jaguars (4–3) – Game summary

Quarter	1	2	3	4	Total
Bulldogs	7	21	7	0	35
Jaguars	14	6	0	0	20

at Hancock Whitney Stadium • Mobile, Alabama

- Date: October 31
- Game time: 2:00 p.m. CDT
- Game weather: Sunny
- Game attendance: 13,078
- Referee: Jeremy Parker
- TV announcers (ESPN+): Pat Greenwood (play-by-play) and Brian Genard (analyst)

Game information

First quarter

- (9:33) USA – Anthony Eager 10-yard pass from Jared Hollins, Davis Little kick (Drive: 7 plays, 51 yards, 3:21; South Alabama 7–0)
- (8:12) LT – Andrew Burnette 4-yard run, Kaegan Kent kick (Drive: 4 plays, 91 yards, 1:12; Tied 7–7)
- (0:39) USA – Anthony Eager 9-yard pass from Jared Hollins, Davis Little kick (Drive: 14 plays, 75 yards, 7:33; South Alabama 14–7)

Second quarter

- (13:03) LT – Marcus Calwise Jr. 22-yard pass from Blake Baker, Kaegan Kent kick (Drive: 8 plays, 82 yards, 2:30; Tied 14–14)
- (8:50) LT – Jalen Mickens 27-yard pass from Trey Kukuk, Kaegan Kent kick (Drive: 4 plays, 53 yards, 1:37; Louisiana Tech 21–14)
- (6:47) USA – Keenan Phillips 11-yard run (Drive: 4 plays, 75 yards, 2:03; Louisiana Tech 21–20)
- (3:12) LT – Blake Baker 35-yard pass from Blake Baker, Kaegan Kent kick (Drive: 8 plays, 75 yards, 3:35; Louisiana Tech 21–20)

Third quarter

- (0:39) LT – Luke Watkins 4-yard pass from Blake Baker, Kaegan Kent kick (Drive: 2 plays, 10 yards, 0:41; Louisiana Tech 21–20)

Fourth quarter

No scoring plays

Statistics	LT	USA
First downs	16	24
Plays–yards	57–315	75–397
Rushes–yards	40–121	44–205
Passing yards	194	192
Passing: comp–att–int	11–17–0	14–31–1
Time of possession	26:37	33:23

Team	Category	Player	Statistics
Louisiana Tech	Passing	Blake Baker	10/16, 167 yards, 3 TD
Louisiana Tech	Rushing	Rayshun Hurt	6 carries, 40 yards
Louisiana Tech	Receiving	Marcus Calwise Jr.	3 receptions, 68 yards, 2 TD
South Alabama	Passing	Jared Hollins	14/31, 192 yards, 2 TD, INT
South Alabama	Rushing	PJ Martin	12 carries, 82 yards
South Alabama	Receiving	Anthony Eager	7 receptions, 102 yards, 2 TD

=== at Louisiana ===
South Alabama Jaguars (4–4) at Louisiana Ragin' Cajuns (5–3) – Game summary

Quarter	1	2	3	4	Total
Jaguars	7	10	6	3	26
Ragin' Cajuns	7	14	7	0	28

at Cajun Field • Lafayette, Louisiana

- Date: November 7
- Game time: 4:00 p.m. CDT
- Game weather: Sunny • Temperature: 74 °F (23 °C) • Wind: N at 9 miles per hour (14 km/h)
- Game attendance: 14,194
- Referee: Brandon Kirkland
- TV announcers (ESPN+): Dan McDonald (play-by-play), Steve Peloquin (analyst) and Ben Schafer (sideline)

Game information

First quarter

- (14:48) LA – JJ Garner 100-yard kickoff return, Tony Sterner kick (Louisiana 7–0)
- (2:11) USA – Bishop Davenport 1-yard run, Dylan Freebury kick (Drive: 14 plays, 63 yards, 6:03; Tied 7–7)

Second quarter

- (14:51) USA – JJ Garner 65-yard run, Tony Sterner kick (Drive: 5 plays, 86 yards, 2:15; Louisiana 14–7)
- (9:28) USA – Jaylen Moson 72-yard interception, Dylan Freebury kick (Tied 14–14)
- (4:16) LA – Lunch Winfield 14-yard run, Tony Sterner kick (Drive: 8 plays, 78 yards, 5:04; Louisiana 21–14)
- (1:13) USA – Dylan Freebury 44-yard field goal (Drive: 9 plays, 44 yards, 2:57; Louisiana 21–17)

Third quarter

- (3:52) LA – Shelton Sampson Jr. 27-yard pass from Lunch Winfield, Tony Sterner kick (Drive: 6 plays, 81 yards, 2:36; Louisiana 28–17)
- (3:18) USA – Bishop Davenport 45-yard run (Drive: 2 plays, 89 yards, 0:29; Louisiana 28–23)

Fourth quarter

- (10:26) USA – Dylan Freebury 50-yard field goal (Drive: 9 plays, 41 yards, 4:29; Louisiana 28–26)

Statistics	USA	LA
First downs	17	19
Plays–yards	57–369	58–459
Rushes–yards	35–159	44–312
Passing yards	210	147
Passing: comp–att–int	16–22–1	10–14–1
Time of possession	28:23	31:37

Team	Category	Player	Statistics
South Alabama	Passing	Bishop Davenport	16/22, 210 yards, INT
South Alabama	Rushing	Bishop Davenport	11 carries, 57 yards, 2 TD
South Alabama	Receiving	Brendan Jenkins	6 receptions, 101 yards
Louisiana	Passing	Lunch Winfield	10/14, 147 yards, TD, INT
Louisiana	Rushing	JJ Garner	10 carries, 136 yards, TD
Louisiana	Receiving	Trenton Chaney	2 receptions, 46 yards

=== Troy (Battle for the Belt) ===
Troy Trojans (4–5) at South Alabama Jaguars (4–5) – Game summary

Quarter	1	2	3	4	Total
Trojans	0	7	0	7	14
Jaguars	14	3	10	0	27

at Hancock Whitney Stadium • Mobile, Alabama

- Date: November 14
- Game time: 6:00 p.m. CDT
- Game weather: Sunny
- Game attendance: 22,269
- Referee: Jay Hagood
- TV announcers (ESPN+): Pat Greenwood (play-by-play) and Brian Genard (analyst)

Game information

First quarter

- (13:34) USA – Trae'von Dunbar 46-yard run, Dylan Freebury kick (Drive: 5 plays, 68 yards, 1:19; South Alabama 7–0)
- (0:37) USA – Trae'von Dunbar 44-yard run, Dylan Freebury kick (Drive: 6 plays, 61 yards, 2:20; South Alabama 14–0)

Second quarter

- (11:21) TROY – Goose Crowder 45-yard run, Hayden Wolfe kick (Drive: 4 plays, 54 yards, 1:48; South Alabama 14–7)
- (4:02) USA – Dylan Freebury 29-yard field goal (Drive: 17 plays, 62 yards, 7:12; South Alabama 17–7)

Third quarter

- (10:52) USA – Dylan Freebury 24-yard field goal (Drive: 6 plays, 71 yards, 2:40; South Alabama 20–7)
- (5:11) USA – Bishop Davenport 28-yard run, Dylan Freebury kick (Drive: 4 plays, 54 yards, 1:52; South Alabama 27–7)

Fourth quarter

- (14:11) TROY – Nick Hampton 4-yard pass from Goose Crowder, Hayden Wolfe kick (Drive: 13 plays, 81 yards, 5:56; South Alabama 27–14)

Statistics	TROY	USA
First downs	20	17
Plays–yards	74–354	60–368
Rushes–yards	33–123	39–246
Passing yards	231	122
Passing: comp–att–int	24–41–0	9–21–0
Time of possession	32:32	27:28

Team	Category	Player	Statistics
Troy	Passing	Goose Crowder	24/41, 231 yards, TD
Troy	Rushing	Goose Crowder	11 carries, 58 yards, TD
Troy	Receiving	Noreel White	4 receptions, 55 yards
South Alabama	Passing	Bishop Davenport	9/21, 122 yards
South Alabama	Rushing	Trae'von Dunbar	14 carries, 153 yards, 2 TD
South Alabama	Receiving	Trae Stevenson	1 reception, 46 yards

=== at Southern Miss ===
South Alabama Jaguars (5–5) at Southern Miss Golden Eagles (3–7) – Game summary

Quarter	1	2	3	4	Total
Jaguars	13	6	0	21	40
Golden Eagles	7	7	15	6	35

at Renasant Stadium • Hattiesburg, Mississippi

- Date: November 21
- Game time: 3:00 p.m. CDT
- Game weather: Sunny
- Referee: Steven Robinson
- TV announcers (ESPN+): Jason Baker (play-by-play) and Larry Boyd (analyst)

Game information

First quarter

- (11:39) USA – Bishop Davenport 3-yard run (Drive: 8 plays, 75 yards, 3:21; South Alabama 6–0)
- (7:17) USA – Anthony Eager 38-yard pass from Bishop Davenport, Dylan Freebury kick (Drive: 7 plays, 70 yards, 3:35; South Alabama 13–0)
- (4:56) USM – Steven Robinson 23-yard run, Creighton Wilbanks kick (Drive: 6 plays, 60 yards, 2:13; South Alabama 13–7)

Second quarter

- (12:19) USA – Dylan Freebury 29-yard field goal (Drive: 14 plays, 64 yards, 7:37; South Alabama 16–7)
- (6:30) USM – Grant Page 46-yard pass from John White, Creighton Wilbanks kick (Drive: 6 plays, 64 yards, 1:49; South Alabama 16–14)
- (0:41) USA – Dylan Freebury 33-yard field goal (Drive: 10 plays, 64 yards, 2:17; South Alabama 19–14)

Third quarter

- (6:34) USM – Jamarice Wilder 1-yard run, Steven Robinson pass (Drive: 5 plays, 25 yards, 1:56; Southern Miss 22–19)
- (0:45) USM – Mario Sanders 50-yard pass from John White, Creighton Wilbanks kick (Drive: 6 plays, 86 yards, 2:45; Southern Miss 29–19)

Fourth quarter

- (13:23) USA – Anthony Eager 13-yard pass from Bishop Davenport, Dylan Freebury kick (Drive: 6 plays, 75 yards, 2:16; Southern Miss 29–26)
- (7:48) USA – PJ Martin 50-yard run, Dylan Freebury kick (Drive: 5 plays, 86 yards, 2:27; South Alabama 33–29)
- (1:57) USA – PJ Martin 6-yard run, Dylan Freebury kick (Drive: 10 plays, 50 yards, 5:08; South Alabama 40–29)
- (0:53) USM – Mario Sanders 45-yard pass from John White (Drive: 5 plays, 82 yards, 0:57; South Alabama 40–35)

Statistics	USA	USM
First downs	28	19
Plays–yards	79–514	60–415
Rushes–yards	51–247	24–121
Passing yards	267	294
Passing: comp–att–int	20–28–0	21–36–1
Time of possession	37:13	22:47

Team	Category	Player	Statistics
South Alabama	Passing	Bishop Davenport	20/28, 267 yards, 2 TD
South Alabama	Rushing	PJ Martin	16 carries, 128 yards, 2 TD
South Alabama	Receiving	Trae Stevenson	6 receptions, 128 yards
Southern Miss	Passing	John White	21/35, 294 yards, 3 TD, INT
Southern Miss	Rushing	Steven Robinson	11 carries, 82 yards, TD
Southern Miss	Receiving	Mario Sanders	7 receptions, 143 yards, 2 TD

=== Appalachian State ===
Appalachian State Mountaineers (7–4) at South Alabama Jaguars (6–5) – Game summary

Quarter	1	2	3	4	Total
Mountaineers	0	0	0	0	0
Jaguars	0	0	0	0	0

at Hancock Whitney Stadium • Mobile, Alabama

- Date: November 27
- Game time: 2:00 p.m. CDT
- TV: ESPN+

Game information

First quarter
Second quarter
Third quarter
Fourth quarter

Statistics	APP	USA
First downs		
Plays–yards		
Rushes–yards		
Passing yards		
Passing: comp–att–int		
Time of possession		

Team	Category	Player	Statistics
Appalachian State	Passing		
Appalachian State	Rushing		
Appalachian State	Receiving		
South Alabama	Passing		
South Alabama	Rushing		
South Alabama	Receiving		
