= Alex Mortensen =

American football player and coach (born 1985)

Current position
- Title: Head coach
- Team: UAB
- Conference: American
- Record: 8–9

Biographical details
- Born: November 24, 1985 (age 40); Atlanta, Georgia, U.S.

Playing career
- 2004–2005: Arkansas
- 2006–2007: Samford
- 2008: Arkansas
- 2009: Tennessee Titans (Note: Offseason and/or practice squad member only)
- Position: Quarterback

Coaching career (HC unless noted)
- 2012: New Mexico Highlands (QB)
- 2013: St. Louis Rams (AC)
- 2014–2016: Alabama (GA)
- 2017–2019: Alabama (analyst)
- 2019: Birmingham Iron (WR)
- 2020–2022: Alabama (analyst)
- 2023–2025: UAB (OC)
- 2025: UAB (interim HC)
- 2026–present: UAB

Head coaching record
- Overall: 8–9

Alexander Christian Mortensen (born November 24, 1985) is an American football coach and former player who is the head coach at the University of Alabama at Birmingham. He played college football as a quarterback for the University of Arkansas and Samford University. He was signed by the Tennessee Titans as an undrafted free agent in 2009.

== Early life ==
Mortensen attended Landmark Christian School in Atlanta, Georgia. He was named the 2003 Atlanta Journal-Constitution Class-A Offensive Player of the Year at Landmark Christian. As a senior, he completed 159-of-269 passes for 2,565 yards and 29 touchdowns, was named first-team all-state by the Associated Press and the Atlanta Journal-Constitution and was a three-time all-state selection. The team posted a record of 29–7 over his last three seasons. He was also selected to the Tom Lemming's Prep Football Report All-America squad, which ranked him as the No. 25 overall quarterback in the country and the No. 1 quarterback in Georgia and was rated as the No. 29 pro-style quarterback in the nation by Rivals.com. He received the Headmaster's Award for student leadership in high school.

== College career ==
Mortensen began his college career at Arkansas before transferring to Samford, then returning to Arkansas to finish. Mortensen's cumulative stats in college were 40-84 for 372 yards, four touchdowns and four interceptions.

In 2005, Mortensen announced: "On Friday, I had a bittersweet meeting with Coach Nutt when I told him that I would be leaving the University of Arkansas and that I will transfer to Samford University in Birmingham, Alabama, beginning this fall of 2006."

== Professional career ==
Pre-draft measurables
Height	Weight	40-yard dash	10-yard split	20-yard split	Vertical jump	Broad jump	Bench press
6 ft 2 in (1.88 m)	222 lb (101 kg)	4.82 s	1.64 s	2.75 s	33 1/2 in (0.85 m)	9 ft 7 in (2.92 m)	21 reps
All values from Arkansas Razorbacks pro day.

=== Tennessee Titans ===
After going undrafted in the 2009 NFL draft, Mortensen was signed by the Tennessee Titans as an undrafted free agent. He played an offensive series in the Hall of Fame Game against the Buffalo Bills on August 9, completing 1-of-2 with an interception returned for a touchdown by Bills cornerback Reggie Corner. Two days later, the Titans waived Mortensen.

== Coaching career ==
In 2012, Mortensen joined New Mexico Highlands University as their passing game coordinator. He then spent 2013 as a coaching assistant with the St. Louis Rams. In 2014, he joined the Alabama Crimson Tide as an offensive graduate assistant.

In 2018, Mortensen became the wide receivers coach for the Birmingham Iron of the Alliance of American Football.

Mortensen was named offensive coordinator of the UAB Blazers by head coach Trent Dilfer on December 2, 2022. Mortensen replaced Dilfer as interim head coach on October 12, 2025, after UAB fired Dilfer. In his head coaching debut, Mortensen led UAB to an upset of #22 Memphis.

Following the 2025 season, Mortensen was retained as the permanent head coach for UAB.

== Personal life ==
Mortensen is the son of late ESPN NFL analyst Chris Mortensen and Micki Mortensen.

== Head coaching record ==
Year	Team	Overall	Conference	Standing	Bowl/playoffs
UAB Blazers (American Conference) (2025–present)
2025	UAB	2–4 (Note: Mortensen replaced Trent Dilfer after six games)	2–3	T–11th	
2026	UAB	6–5	4–3		
UAB:		8–9	6–6		
Total:		8–9			
