= Roderick Robinson II =

American football player (born 2004)

No. 2 – UAB Blazers
- Position: Running back
- Class: Redshirt Junior

Personal information
- Born: December 30, 2004 (age 21)
- Listed height: 6 ft 1 in (1.85 m)
- Listed weight: 235 lb (107 kg)

Career information
- High school: Lincoln (San Diego, California)
- College: Georgia (2023–2025); UAB (2026–present)
- Stats at ESPN

Roderick Quintin Robinson II (born December 30, 2004) is an American college football running back for the UAB Blazers. He previously played for the Georgia Bulldogs.

== Early life ==
Robinson attended Lincoln High School in San Diego, California. As a junior, he ran for 1,273 yards and 17 touchdowns, before committing to UCLA. The following year in a game against Mater Dei Catholic High School, Robinson recorded 476 rushing yards and eight touchdowns, tying local records. Robinson helped lead Lincoln to a state championship, rushing for four touchdowns in the title game victory. He finished his senior season with 2,378 rushing yards and 37 touchdowns, being named the MaxPreps California Player of the Year. A four-star recruit, Robinson flipped his commitment to play college football from UCLA to the University of Georgia.

== College career ==
As an early enrollee, Robinson reportedly impressed both teammates and coaches. In his first two career collegiate games, he rushed for 89 yards and two touchdowns, before being sidelined by an ankle injury. As a freshman, Robinson appeared in five games, recording 23 carries for 196 yards and two touchdowns. Returning as the team's leading rusher as a sophomore in 2024, he competed with Trevor Etienne for Georgia's starting running back job. Prior to Georgia's 2024 season opener against Clemson, Robinson was ruled out after undergoing surgery to repair a toe injury.

On January 16, 2026, Robinson announced his decision to transfer to the University of Alabama at Birmingham to play for the UAB Blazers.

=== Statistics ===
College statistics
Season	Team	Games	Rushing				Receiving			
Season	Team	GP	Att	Yards	Avg	TD	Rec	Yards	Avg	TD
2023	Georgia	5	24	196	8.2	2	–	–	–	–
2024	Georgia	2	4	3	0.8	0	2	34	17.0	0
2025	Georgia	10	6	22	3.7	0	2	13	6.5	1
2026	UAB	1	14	59	4.2	0	2	14	7.0	1
Career		18	48	280	5.8	2	6	61	10.2	2
