= Jesse Montalto =

American college football coach

Current position
- Title: Offensive coordinator
- Team: Louisiana–Monroe
- Conference: Sun Belt

Playing career
- 2001–2004: Upper Iowa
- Position: Wide receiver

Coaching career (HC unless noted)
- 2005–2006: Upper Iowa (WR)
- 2007–2008: Upper Iowa (OC/QB)
- 2009–2013: Upper Iowa (QB)
- 2014–2017: Ellsworth
- 2018–2025: Iowa Central
- 2026–present: Louisiana–Monroe (OC)

Head coaching record
- Overall: 69–65
- Bowls: 10–0 (junior college)

Jesse Montalto is an American college football coach. He is the offensive coordinator at the University of Louisiana at Monroe, a position he had held since 2026. Montalto served as the head football coach at Ellsworth Community College in Iowa Falls, Iowa from 2014 to 2017 and Iowa Central Community College in Fort Dodge, Iowa from 2018 to 2025.

Montalto played college football as a wide receiver at Upper Iowa University from 2001 to 2004. He was then an assistant football coach at his alma mater for nine seasons before he was hired at Ellsworth. A native of West Palm Beach, Florida, Montalto was inducted into the Upper Iowa University Athletics Hall of Fame in 2017.

== Head coaching record ==
Year	Team	Overall	Conference	Standing	Bowl/playoffs	NJCAA^{#}
Ellsworth Panthers (Iowa Community College Athletic Conference) (2014–2017)
2014	Ellsworth	3–8	0–2	3rd	W Graphic Edge Bowl	
2015	Ellsworth	7–5	1–1	2nd	W Graphic Edge Bowl	18
2016	Ellsworth	6–6	1–1	2nd	W Graphic Edge Bowl	
2017	Ellsworth	4–8	1–1	2nd	W Graphic Edge Bowl	
Ellsworth:		20–27	3–5			
Iowa Central Tritons (Iowa Community College Athletic Conference) (2018–2025)
2018	Iowa Central	8–4	1–1	2nd	W Graphic Edge Bowl	13
2019	Iowa Central	2–9	0–2	3rd		
2020–21	Iowa Central	2–6	0–4	3rd		
2021	Iowa Central	9–2	2–2	2nd	W Graphic Edge Bowl	7
2022	Iowa Central	7–4	1–1	2nd	W Game One Bowl	10
2023	Iowa Central	7–4	1–1	2nd	W Game One Bowl	7
2024	Iowa Central	6–6	1–1	2nd	W Game One Bowl	
2025	Iowa Central	8–4	1–1	2nd	W Game One Bowl	9
Iowa Central:		49–38	7–13			
Total:		69–65				
