= 2026 Auburn Tigers football team =

American college football season

2026 Auburn Tigers football
- Conference: Southeastern Conference
- Record: 7–4 (4–4 SEC)
- Head coach: Alex Golesh (1st season)
- Offensive coordinator: Joel Gordon (1st season)
- Co-offensive coordinator: Kodi Burns (4th season)
- Offensive scheme: Veer and shoot
- Defensive coordinator: D. J. Durkin (3rd season)
- Co-defensive coordinator: Tim Banks (1st season)
- Base defense: Multiple
- Home stadium: Jordan–Hare Stadium

2026 Southeastern Conference football standings
	Conf.			Overall
Team	W		L	W		L
No. 1 Georgia y	8	–	1	10	–	1
No. 5 Texas	6	–	2	9	–	2
No. 9 Tennessee	6	–	2	9	–	2
No. 3 Alabama	6	–	2	9	–	2
No. 22 Oklahoma	5	–	3	7	–	4
No. 24 Florida	5	–	4	7	–	4
No. 16 Kentucky	5	–	4	7	–	4
No. 25 Ole Miss	4	–	4	7	–	4
Auburn	4	–	4	7	–	4
Missouri	4	–	4	7	–	4
No. 21 South Carolina	4	–	5	6	–	5
LSU	3	–	5	6	–	5
Mississippi State	2	–	6	5	–	6
Arkansas	2	–	6	4	–	7
Texas A&M	1	–	7	4	–	7
Vanderbilt	1	–	7	4	–	7
Championship: Georgia vs TBD
^ – College Football Playoff participant; $ – Conference champion; y – Championship game participant; As of November 22, 2026; Rankings from CFP rankings

The 2026 Auburn Tigers football team represents Auburn University as a member of the Southeastern Conference (SEC) during the 2026 NCAA Division I FBS football season. The Tigers are being led by first-year head coach Alex Golesh. They play their home games at Jordan–Hare Stadium located in Auburn, Alabama.

== Offseason ==
Positions key
Offense	Defense	Special teams
QB — Quarterback; RB — Running back; FB — Fullback; WR — Wide receiver; TE — Tight end; OL — Offensive lineman; T — Tackle; G — Guard; C — Center	DL — Defensive lineman; DT — Defensive tackle (Note: Includes nose tackle (NT)); DE — Defensive end; EDGE — Edge rusher; LB — Linebacker (Note: Includes middle linebacker (MLB/MIKE), weakside linebacker (WILL), strongside linebacker (SAM), off-ball linebacker, and outside linebacker (OLB)); DB — Defensive back; CB — Cornerback; S — Safety (Note: Includes free safety (FS) and strong safety (SS))	K — Kicker (Note: Also known as a placekicker (PK)); P — Punter; LS — Long snapper; RS — Return specialist (Note: Includes kickoff and punt returners)

=== Entered NFL draft ===
Five Auburn players were drafted in 2026.

Player	Position	Round	Pick	Drafted by
Keldric Faulk	DE	1	31	Tennessee Titans
Keyron Crawford	DE	3	67	Las Vegas Raiders
Connor Lew	C	4	128	Cincinnati Bengals
Jeremiah Wright	G	4	132	New Orleans Saints
Bobby Jamison-Travis	DT	6	186	New York Giants

=== Transfer portal ===
==== Departures ====
Thirty-seven Auburn players elected to enter the NCAA Transfer Portal during or after the 2025 season.

Departing transfers
Name	Pos.	Height/weight	Class	Hometown	New school	Sources
Damari Alston	RB	5'9", 214	Senior	Atlanta, GA	Tulsa	
Antonio Coleman	OL	6'1", 256	Freshman	Saraland, AL	Alabama A&M	
Raion Strader	CB	6'0", 185	Junior	Pittsburgh, PA	Pittsburgh	
Perry Thompson	WR	6'3", 220	Sophomore	Foley, AL	Minnesota	
Caleb Wheatland	LB	6'1", 231	Senior	Chantilly, VA	Michigan State	
Horatio Fields	WR	6'2", 201	Redshirt Senior	Douglasville, GA	Ole Miss	
A'mon Lane-Ganus	CB	5'10", 180	Sophomore	Moody, AL	USF	
Hollis Davidson III	TE	6'5", 238	Freshman	Peachtree City, GA	Alabama A&M	
Malcolm Simmons	WR	6'0", 186	Sophomore	Alexander City, AL	Texas Tech	
DeAndre Carter	OL	6'4", 355	Freshman	Santa Ana, CA	Iowa State	
Favour Ebuka Edwin	OT	6'6", 317	Freshman	McDonough, GA	Georgia Tech	
Cam'Ron King	WR	6'0", 195	Freshman	Ocala, FL	Georgia Southern	
Seth Wilfred	OL	6'5", 339	Junior	Las Vegas, NV	Utah State	
Jay Crawford	CB	5'11", 179	Sophomore	Lilburn, GA	Ole Miss	
Malik Blocton	DL	6'3", 291	Sophomore	Pike Road, AL	LSU	
Towns McGough	K	6'0", 185	Sophomore	Auburn, AL	California	
Jamonta Waller	OL	6'0", 256	Freshman	Picayune, MS	Arkansas	
Amaris Williams	DE	6'2", 260	Sophomore	Clinton, NC	Georgia	
Ashton Daniels	QB	6'2", 219	Senior	Buford, GA	Florida State	
Kayin Lee	CB	5'11", 180	Junior	Ellenwood, GA	Tennessee	
Donovan Starr	CB	5'11", 182	Freshman	Brentwood, TN	Clemson	
Robert Woodyard Jr.	LB	6'0", 245	Junior	Mobile, AL	Missouri	
Xavier Chaplin	OT	6'7", 348	Redshirt Junior	Seabrook, SC	Florida State	
Kensley Louidor-Faustin	S	5'11", 183	Sophomore	Naples, FL	Missouri	
Cam Coleman	WR	6'3", 201	Sophomore	Phenix City, AL	Texas	
Deuce Knight	QB	6'4", 217	Freshman	Lucedale, MS	Ole Miss	
Dylan Senda	OL	6'5", 320	Redshirt Sophomore	Dearborn, MI	Toledo	
Preston Howard	TE	6'5", 236	Redshirt Junior	Owings Mills, MD	Maryland	
Jackson Arnold	QB	6'1", 219	Junior	Denton, TX	UNLV	
James Ash	DL	6'3", 302	Redshirt Senior	Tampa, FL	TBD	
Taye Seymore	S	5'11", 200	Sophomore	Atlanta, GA	North Texas	
Durell Robinson	RB	6'0", 207	Redshirt Sophomore	Baltimore, MD	Colorado State	
Broderick Shull	OT	6'5", 327	Freshman	Bixby, OK	Oregon State	
DJ Barber	LB	5'11", 219	Sophomore	Pinson, AL	Alabama A&M	
Tyler Johnson	OT	6'6", 323	Sophomore	Natchitoches, LA	Kansas State	
Eric Singleton Jr.	WR	5'10", 180	Junior	Douglasville, GA	Florida	
Tyler Brown	DL	5'11", 235	Freshman	Macon, GA	TBD	

==== Incoming ====
Over the offseason, Auburn added thirty-nine players from the transfer portal. According to 247Sports, Auburn had the No. 13 ranked transfer class in the country.

Incoming transfers
Name	Pos.	Height/weight	Class	Hometown	Prev. school	Sources
Locklan Hewlett	QB	6'1", 195	Freshman	St. Augustine, FL	USF	
Christian Neptune	WR	5'11", 189	Freshman	Cantonment, FL	USF	
Kory Pettigrew	WR	6'1", 180	Freshman	Perry, GA	USF	
Nykahi Davenport	RB	6'0", 216	Sophomore	Roswell, GA	USF	
Jonathan Echols	TE	6'6", 235	Sophomore	Bradenton, FL	USF	
Fred Gaskin	S	5'10", 198	Sophomore	Ocala, FL	USF	
Gavin Jenkins	CB	6'2", 181	Freshman	Lake Butler, FL	USF	
Jeremiah Koger	WR	6'3", 209	Freshman	Baltimore, MD	USF	
Byrum Brown	QB	6'3", 232	Senior	Rolesville, NC	USF	
Xavier Newsom	TE	6'6", 240	Freshman	Detroit, MI	Howard	
Chas Nimrod	WR	6'2", 198	Redshirt Junior	Bentonville, AR	USF	
Stanton Ramil	OT	6'7", 312	Redshirt Sophomore	Alabaster, AL	Michigan State	
Cody Sigler	DL	6'3", 297	Redshirt Junior	New Hope, AL	Arkansas State	
Keshaun Singleton	WR	6'3", 215	Redshirt Freshman	Norcross, GA	USF	
Joseph Simmons	OT	6'5", 322	Redshirt Junior	Wilmington, DE	James Madison	
Saint Farrior	OL	6'3", 335	Redshirt Sophomore	Durham, NC	Appalachian State	
Jake Johnson	TE	6'6", 240	Redshirt Junior	Bogart, GA	North Carolina	
Nate Johnson	DE	6'5", 252	Junior	Gaffney, SC	Missouri	
Andre Jordan Jr.	CB	6'1", 175	Junior	Federal Way, WA	UCLA	
Bryson Washington	RB	6'0", 216	Redshirt Sophomore	Franklin, TX	Baylor	
Shamar Arnoux	CB	6'2", 189	Freshman	Carrollton, GA	Florida State	
Cole Best	OL	6'4", 315	Junior	Winter Park, FL	USF	
Cole Skinner	OL	6'5", 325	Junior	Point Pleasant Beach, NJ	USF	
Tristan Ti'a	QB	6'2", 205	Freshman	Pleasanton, CA	Oregon State	
Walter Mathis Jr.	DL	6'2", 285	Freshman	Savannah, GA	LSU	
Jacob Strand	OT	6'5", 302	Senior	Canby, OR	Oregon State	
TJ Hedrick	OT	6'4", 320	Freshman	Naples, FL	Ole Miss	
Scrap Richardson	WR	6'0", 185	Freshman	Greenville, GA	Notre Dame	
Da'Shawn Womack	DE	6'5", 265	Junior	Baltimore, MD	Ole Miss	
Jack Leyrer	OT	6'5", 300		Dallas, TX	Stanford	
Jack Luttrell	S	6'0", 188	Redshirt Sophomore	Moultrie, GA	Arizona	
Hudson Powell	LS	6'3", 230	Senior	Nashville, TN	Miami (OH)	
Kamari Todd	CB	6'1", 170	Freshman	Gardendale, AL	Chattanooga	
Hunter Herring	QB	6'4", 200		Monroe, LA	Louisiana–Monroe	
Kenneth McManus IV	OL	6'2", 320	Freshman	Washington, DC	Akron	
Tae Meadows	RB	5'10", 180	Senior	Roanoke, AL	Troy	
Deryc Plazz	OT	6'4", 310	Freshman	Jacksonville, FL	Miami (FL)	
Arlis Boardingham	TE	6'3", 245	Redshirt Junior	Van Nuys, CA	Bowling Green	
Michael Matthews-Canty	LB	6'3", 215	Sophomore	Fredericksburg, VA	Hampton	

=== Recruiting ===
College recruiting (2026)
Name	Hometown	School	Height	Weight	Commit date
Wayne Henry; S	Baltimore, MD	Saint Frances Academy	5 ft 9 in (1.75 m)	160 lb (73 kg)	Aug 5, 2024
Wayne Henry; S	Recruit ratings: 247Sports: On3: ESPN: (76)				
Parker Pritchett; IOL	Columbus, GA	George Washington Carver High School	6 ft 5 in (1.96 m)	310 lb (140 kg)	Apr 5, 2025
Parker Pritchett; IOL	Recruit ratings: 247Sports: On3: ESPN: (80)				
Adam Balogoung-Ali; LB	West Palm Beach, FL	Cardinal Newman High School	6 ft 2 in (1.88 m)	210 lb (95 kg)	Jul 8, 2025
Adam Balogoung-Ali; LB	Recruit ratings: 247Sports: On3: ESPN: (82)				
Travis Wakefield; LS	Nashville, TN	Lipscomb Academy	6 ft 2 in (1.88 m)	212 lb (96 kg)	Jul 9, 2025
Travis Wakefield; LS	Recruit ratings: 247Sports: On3: ESPN: (68)				
Wilson Zierer; OT	Rabun Gap, GA	Rabun Gap-Nacoochee School	6 ft 6 in (1.98 m)	280 lb (130 kg)	Jul 17, 2025
Wilson Zierer; OT	Recruit ratings: 247Sports: On3: ESPN: (80)				
Jaquez Wilkes; LB	Wadley, AL	Wadley High School	6 ft 4 in (1.93 m)	220 lb (100 kg)	Jul 21, 2025
Jaquez Wilkes; LB	Recruit ratings: 247Sports: On3: ESPN: (82)				
Shadarius Toodle; LB	Mobile, AL	Cottage Hill Christian Academy	6 ft 3 in (1.91 m)	215 lb (98 kg)	Oct 14, 2025
Shadarius Toodle; LB	Recruit ratings: 247Sports: On3: ESPN: (81)				
Shadrick Toodle Jr. S	Mobile, AL	Cottage Hill Christian Academy	6 ft 3 in (1.91 m)	199 lb (90 kg)	Oct 14, 2025
Shadrick Toodle Jr. S	Recruit ratings: 247Sports: On3: ESPN: (74)				
Damarcus Broughton; TE	Semmes, AL	Mary G. Montgomery High School	6 ft 5 in (1.96 m)	220 lb (100 kg)	Dec 1, 2025
Damarcus Broughton; TE	Recruit ratings: 247Sports: On3: ESPN: (73)				
DeShawn Spencer; WR	Saraland, AL	Saraland High School	5 ft 11 in (1.80 m)	163 lb (74 kg)	Dec 2, 2025
DeShawn Spencer; WR	Recruit ratings: 247Sports: On3: ESPN: (78)				
Tavian Branch; DL	Taylor, PA	Riverside High School	6 ft 3 in (1.91 m)	300 lb (140 kg)	Dec 3, 2025
Tavian Branch; DL	Recruit ratings: 247Sports: On3: ESPN: (77)				
Rhys Brush; QB	Seffner, FL	Armwood High School	6 ft 2 in (1.88 m)	180 lb (82 kg)	Dec 3, 2025
Rhys Brush; QB	Recruit ratings: 247Sports: On3: ESPN: (75)				
Brian Williams Jr. WR	Orlando, FL	The First Academy	6 ft 4 in (1.93 m)	190 lb (86 kg)	Dec 3, 2025
Brian Williams Jr. WR	Recruit ratings: 247Sports: On3: ESPN: (77)				
Mason Mathis; OT	Pace, FL	Pace High School	6 ft 5 in (1.96 m)	320 lb (150 kg)	Dec 5, 2025
Mason Mathis; OT	Recruit ratings: 247Sports: On3: ESPN: (76)				
Bear McWhorter; IOL	White, GA	Cass High School	6 ft 4 in (1.93 m)	302 lb (137 kg)	Dec 15, 2025
Bear McWhorter; IOL	Recruit ratings: 247Sports: On3: ESPN: (81)				
Brady Marchese; WR	Cartersville, GA	Cartersville High School	6 ft 1 in (1.85 m)	185 lb (84 kg)	Dec 28, 2025
Brady Marchese; WR	Recruit ratings: 247Sports: On3: ESPN: (84)				
Overall recruit ranking: 247Sports: 31 On3: 42 ESPN: 29
Note: In many cases, Scout, Rivals, 247Sports, On3, and ESPN may conflict in their listings of height and weight.; In these cases, the average was taken. ESPN grades are on a 100-point scale.; Sources: "2026 Player commitments - Auburn". ESPN.; "2026 Team Ranking". Rivals.com.; "Auburn Football 2026 commits". 247Sports.; "2026 Auburn football recruits". On3.

== Preseason ==
=== Spring game ===
The Tigers hosted spring practice sessions three days a week beginning on March 17, and ending with the spring game, "A-Day" on Saturday, April 18. In the game, Team White defeated Team Blue by a score of 66–43.

2026 A-Day Spring Game

Quarter	1	2	3	4	Total
Blue	13	10	12	8	43
White	16	17	11	22	66

at Jordan–Hare Stadium, Auburn, AL

- Date: April 18, 2026
- Game time: 2:00 pm CDT
- Game attendance: 34,276

=== Award watch lists ===
Listed in the order that they were released

Award	Player	Position	Year	Source
Maxwell Award	Byrum Brown	QB	Sr.	
Maxwell Award	Jeremiah Cobb	RB	Sr.	
Bronko Nagurski Trophy	Xavier Atkins	LB	Jr.	
Patrick Mannelly Award	Hudson Powell	LS	Sr.	
Rimington Trophy	Cole Best	C	Sr.	
Lou Groza Award	Alex McPherson	PK	R-Sr.	
Paul Hornung Award	Rayshawn Pleasant	CB	R-Sr.	
Lombardi Award	Xavier Atkins	LB	Jr.	
Wuerffel Trophy	Alex McPherson	K	R-Sr.	
Butkus Award	Xavier Atkins	LB	Jr.	
Walter Camp Award	Xavier Atkins	LB	Jr.	
Biletnikoff Award	Keshaun Singleton	WR	R-Jr.	
Johnny Unitas Golden Arm Award	Byrum Brown	QB	Sr.	
Comeback Player of the Year Award	Champ Anthony	S	Sr.	
Comeback Player of the Year Award	Chas Nimrod	WR	R-Sr.	
Chuck Bednarik Award	Xavier Atkins	LB	Jr.	
Manning Award	Byrum Brown	QB	Sr.	
Earl Campbell Tyler Rose Award	Bryson Washington	RB	R-Jr.	

=== SEC media days ===
SEC media poll
Predicted finish	Team	Votes (1st place)
1	Georgia	2,519 (88)
2	Texas	2,449 (57)
3	Ole Miss	2,004 (6)
4	Texas A&M	1,967 (5)
5	LSU	1,961 (2)
6	Alabama	1,930 (3)
7	Oklahoma	1,914 (2)
8	Tennessee	1,320
9	Florida	1,217
10	Missouri	1,105
11	South Carolina	956
12	Auburn	936
13	Vanderbilt	751
14	Kentucky	546 (1)
15	Mississippi State	467
16	Arkansas	262

=== Preseason SEC awards ===
2026 Preseason All-SEC teams

==== Media ====
First Team

Position	Player	Class
Defense
LB	Xavier Atkins	Jr.

Third Team

Position	Player	Class
Defense
DB	Champ Anthony	Sr.
Special Teams
PK	Alex McPherson	R-Sr.

==== Coaches ====
First Team

Position	Player	Class
Defense
LB	Xavier Atkins	Jr.

Third Team

Position	Player	Class
Special Teams
PK	Alex McPherson	R-Sr.

=== Preseason All-Americans ===
Preseason All-American Honors
Player	Position	Class	Designation	AP	Athlon	CBS Sports	ESPN	SN	WCFF
Xavier Atkins	LB	Jr.	1st Team Defense	✓	✓	✓	✓	✓	✓

Other All-Americans teams
Player	Position	Class	Selector(s)
Rayshawn Pleasant	RS	RS-Senior	3rd Team Specialists (Athlon)
Xavier Atkins	LB	Junior	2nd Team Defense (USA Today, SI)

== Schedule ==
Date	Time	Opponent	Site	TV	Result	Attendance
September 5	2:30 p.m.	vs. Baylor*	Mercedes-Benz Stadium; Atlanta, GA (Aflac Kickoff Game, SEC Nation)	ABC	W 17–16	55,068
September 12	6:45 p.m.	Southern Miss*	Jordan–Hare Stadium; Auburn, AL	SECN	W 43–8	88,043
September 19	6:00 p.m.	Florida	Jordan–Hare Stadium; Auburn, AL (rivalry, SEC Nation)	ESPN	L 39–44	88,043
September 26	3:15 p.m.	Vanderbilt^{†}	Jordan–Hare Stadium; Auburn, AL	SECN	W 21–15	88,043
October 3	2:30 p.m.	at No. 17 Tennessee	Neyland Stadium; Knoxville, TN (rivalry)	ESPN	L 14–24	101,915
October 17	2:30 p.m.	at No. 1 Georgia	Sanford Stadium; Athens, GA (Deep South's Oldest Rivalry)	ESPN	W 27–24	93,033
October 24	11:00 a.m.	No. 18 LSU	Jordan–Hare Stadium; Auburn, AL (Tiger Bowl, SEC Nation)	ABC	L 17–38	88,043
October 31	11:45 a.m.	at No. 12 Ole Miss	Vaught–Hemingway Stadium; Oxford, MS (rivalry)	SECN	L 15–45	67,041
November 7	11:45 a.m.	Arkansas	Jordan–Hare Stadium; Auburn, AL	SECN	W 26–23	88,043
November 14	3:15 p.m. (Note: The game between Auburn and Mississippi State on November 14 was originally scheduled to begin at 11:00 a.m. on ESPN2, but was delayed until 3:15 p.m. on SEC Network due to the 2026 FAA nationwide ground stop.)	at Mississippi State	Davis Wade Stadium; Starkville, MS	SECN	W 41–9	49,275
November 21	2:30 p.m.	Samford*	Jordan–Hare Stadium; Auburn, AL	SECN	W 59–17	88,043
November 28	6:30 p.m.	at Alabama	Bryant–Denny Stadium; Tuscaloosa, AL (Iron Bowl)	ABC		
*Non-conference game; ^{†}Homecoming; Rankings from AP Poll (and CFP Rankings, after November 3) – Released prior to game; All times are in Central time; Source:

== Game summaries ==
=== vs. Baylor (Aflac Kickoff Game) ===
Baylor Bears (0–0) vs. Auburn Tigers (0–0) – Game summary

Quarter	1	2	3	4	Total
Bears	0	7	0	9	16
Tigers	3	7	0	7	17

at Mercedes-Benz Stadium • Atlanta, Georgia

- Date: September 5
- Game time: 2:47 p.m. CDT
- Game weather: None (retractable roof closed)
- Game attendance: 55,068
- Referee: Tutashinda Salaam
- TV announcers (ABC): Joe Tessitore, Jesse Palmer and Taylor McGregor
- Recap

Game information

First quarter

- AUB – Alex McPherson 43-yard field goal, 8:13. Auburn 3–0. Drive: 7 plays, 45 yards, 1:52.

Second quarter

- AUB – Jeremiah Cobb 15-yard rush (Alex McPherson kick), 3:51. Auburn 10–0. Drive: 5 plays, 57 yards, 2:01.
- BAY – Louis Brown IV 14-yard pass from DJ Lagway (Rhett Armstrong kick), 1:30. Auburn 10–7. Drive: 9 plays, 75 yards, 2:21.

Third quarter

- No scoring plays.

Fourth quarter

- BAY – Rhett Armstrong 22-yard field goal, 7:12. Tied 10–10. Drive: 13 plays, 45 yards, 4:34.
- AUB – Byrum Brown 11-yard rush (Alex McPherson kick), 3:21. Auburn 17–10. Drive: 10 plays, 75 yards, 3:50.
- BAY – Gavin Freeman 5-yard pass from DJ Lagway (Matthew Klopfenstein pass from DJ Lagway failed), 0:09. Auburn 17–16. Drive: 14 plays, 75 yards, 3:12.

Statistics	BAY	AUB
First downs	27	24
Plays–yards	99–436	76–389
Rushes–yards	45–103	41–130
Passing yards	333	259
Passing: comp–att–int	27–54–1	26–35–3
Turnovers	2	3
Time of possession	32:32	27:28

Team	Category	Player	Statistics
Baylor	Passing	DJ Lagway	27/54, 333 yards, 2 TD, INT
Baylor	Rushing	Dawson Pendergrass	25 rushes, 88 yards
Baylor	Receiving	Gavin Freeman	12 receptions, 154 yards, TD
Auburn	Passing	Byrum Brown	26/35, 259 yards, 3 INT
Auburn	Rushing	Jeremiah Cobb	12 rushes, 53 yards, TD
Auburn	Receiving	Keshaun Singleton	7 receptions, 89 yards

=== Southern Miss ===
Southern Miss Golden Eagles (1–0) at Auburn Tigers (1–0) – Game summary

Quarter	1	2	3	4	Total
Golden Eagles	0	8	0	0	8
Tigers	17	10	16	0	43

at Jordan–Hare Stadium • Auburn, Alabama

- Date: September 12
- Game time: 7:50 p.m. CDT
- Game weather: Sunny
- Game attendance: 88,043
- Referee: Tim Barker
- TV announcers (SECN): Matt Schumacker, Aaron Murray and Taylor Davis
- Recap

Game information

First quarter

- AUB – Andre Jordan Jr. 29-yard interception return (Alex McPherson kick), 14:50. Auburn 7–0.
- AUB – Jonathan Echols 22-yard pass from Byrum Brown (Alex McPherson kick), 3:45. Auburn 10–0. Drive: 8 plays, 93 yards, 2:51.
- AUB – Alex McPherson 47-yard field goal, 1:31. Auburn 17–0. Drive: 5 plays, 30 yards, 0:48.

Second quarter

- AUB – DeShawn Spencer 8-yard pass from Byrum Brown (Alex McPherson kick), 6:40. Auburn 24–0. Drive: 8 plays, 85 yards, 3:08.
- USM – Steven Robinson 1-yard pass from Ethan Hampton (Jeremiah Beck Jr. pass from Ethan Hampton), 0:24. Auburn 24–8. Drive: 14 plays, 75 yards, 6:16.
- AUB – Alex McPherson 55-yard field goal, 0:00. Auburn 27–8. Drive: 4 plays, 33 yards, 0:19.

Third quarter

- AUB – Byrum Brown 5-yard pass from Christian Neptune (Alex McPherson kick), 9:56. Auburn 34–8. Drive: 12 plays, 65 yards, 4:57.
- AUB – USM safety, 3:26. Auburn 36–8.
- AUB – Omar Mabson II 2-yard rush (Alex McPherson kick), 0:09. Auburn 43–8. Drive: 10 plays, 64 yards, 3:09.

Fourth quarter

- No scoring plays.

Statistics	USM	AUB
First downs	11	31
Plays–yards	58–221	85–613
Rushes–yards	25–50	51–343
Passing yards	171	270
Passing: comp–att–int	22–33–2	21–34–0
Turnovers	2	1
Time of possession	27:11	32:49

Team	Category	Player	Statistics
Southern Miss	Passing	Ethan Hampton	18/27, 146 yards, TD, 2 INT
Southern Miss	Rushing	Steven Robinson	15 carries, 51 yards
Southern Miss	Receiving	AJ Little	4 receptions, 27 yards
Auburn	Passing	Byrum Brown	18/29, 226 yards, 2 TD
Auburn	Rushing	Omar Mabson II	15 carries, 108 yards, TD
Auburn	Receiving	Chas Nimrod	7 receptions, 52 yards

=== Florida (rivalry) ===
Florida Gators (2–0) at Auburn Tigers (2–0) – Game summary

Quarter	1	2	3	4	Total
Gators	7	13	14	10	44
Tigers	3	14	7	15	39

at Jordan–Hare Stadium • Auburn, Alabama

- Date: September 19
- Game time: 6:05 p.m. CDT
- Game weather: Cloudy • Temperature: 74 °F (23 °C) • Wind: SW 7 miles per hour (11 km/h)
- Game attendance: 88,043
- Referee: Adam Savoie
- TV announcers (ESPN): Tom Hart, Roddy Jones and Quint Kessenich
- Recap

Game information

First quarter

- FLA – Jadan Baugh 2-yard rush (Patrick Durkin kick), 12:06. Florida 7–0. Drive: 3 plays, 41 yards, 2:06.
- AUB – Alex McPherson 40-yard field goal, 8:08. Florida 7–3. Drive: 4 plays, -14 yards, 1:45.

Second quarter

- FLA – Duke Clark 20-yard rush (Patrick Durkin kick), 14:49. Florida 14–3. Drive: 16 plays, 75 yards, 8:19.
- AUB – Jeremiah Cobb 2-yard rush (Alex McPherson kick), 12:38. Florida 14–10. Drive: 8 plays, 75 yards, 2:11.
- FLA – Patrick Durkin 26-yard field goal, 8:15. Florida 17–10. Drive: 11 plays, 67 yards, 4:23.
- AUB – Keshaun Singleton 4-yard pass from Byrum Brown (Alex McPherson kick), 5:21. Tied 17–17. Drive: 9 plays, 75 yards, 2:54.
- FLA – Patrick Durkin 28-yard field goal, 0:09. Florida 20–17. Drive: 11 plays, 65 yards, 5:12.

Third quarter

- FLA – Jadan Baugh 33-yard rush (Patrick Durkin kick), 13:34. Florida 27–17. Drive: 3 plays, 75 yards, 1:26.
- FLA – Dallas Wilson 20-yard pass from Aaron Philo (Patrick Durkin kick), 6:30. Florida 34–17. Drive: 12 plays, 69 yards, 6:29.
- AUB – DeShawn Spencer 10-yard-pass from Byrum Brown (Alex McPherson kick), 1:24. Florida 34–24. Drive: 15 plays, 75 yards, 5:06.

Fourth quarter

- FLA – Jadan Baugh 53-yard rush (Patrick Durkin kick), 12:38. Florida 41–24. Drive: 7 plays, 75 yards, 3:46.
- AUB – Byrum Brown 21-yard rush (Arlis Boardingham pass from Byrum Brown), 6:10. Florida 41–32. Drive: 7 plays, 90 yards, 2:35.
- FLA – Patrick Durkin 40-yard field goal, 2:53. Florida 44–32. Drive: 8 plays, 21 yards, 3:16.
- AUB – Chas Nimrod 35-yard pass from Byrum Brown (Alex McPherson kick), 0:24. Florida 44–39. Drive: 8 plays, 75 yards, 2:29.

Statistics	FLA	AUB
First downs	24	22
Plays–yards	76–495	66–373
Rushes–yards	53–243	31–102
Passing yards	252	271
Passing: comp–att–int	16–23–1	20–35–1
Turnovers	1	1
Time of possession	39:16	20:44

Team	Category	Player	Statistics
Florida	Passing	Aaron Philo	15/22, 204 yards, TD, INT
Florida	Rushing	Jadan Baugh	26 rushes, 162 yards, 3 TD
Florida	Receiving	Vernell Brown III	5 receptions, 86 yards
Auburn	Passing	Byrum Brown	20/35, 271 yards, 3 TD, INT
Auburn	Rushing	Byrum Brown	18 rushes, 65 yards, TD
Auburn	Receiving	Keshaun Singleton	7 receptions, 99 yards, TD

=== Vanderbilt ===
Vanderbilt Commodores (3–0) at Auburn Tigers (2–1) – Game summary

Quarter	1	2	3	4	Total
Commodores	3	0	6	6	15
Tigers	7	7	7	0	21

at Jordan–Hare Stadium • Auburn, Alabama

- Date: September 26
- Game time: 3:20 p.m. CDT
- Game weather: Sunny • Temperature: 81 °F (27 °C) • Wind: NW 6 miles per hour (9.7 km/h)
- Game attendance: 88,043
- Referee: David Smith
- TV announcers (SECN): Taylor Zarzour, Matt Stinchcomb and Michella Chester
- Recap

Game information

First quarter

- VAN – Brock Taylor 39-yard field goal, 9:29. Vanderbilt 3–0. Drive: 4 plays, 3 yards, 1:59.
- AUB – Chas Nimrod 33-yard pass from Byrum Brown (Alex McPherson kick), 7:25. Auburn 7–3. Drive: 6 plays, 75 yards, 2:04.

Second quarter

- AUB – Cade Carlson 10-yard blocked punt recovery (Alex McPherson kick), 8:56. Auburn 14–3.

Third quarter

- VAN – Sedrick Alexander 3-yard rush (Jared Curtis pass failed), 7:07. Auburn 14–9. Drive: 14 plays, 75 yards, 7:53.
- AUB – Byrum Brown 2-yard rush (Alex McPherson kick), 4:40. Auburn 21–9. Drive: 8 plays, 75 yards, 2:27.

Fourth quarter

- VAN – Brock Taylor 47-yard field goal, 12:17. Auburn 21–12. Drive: 16 plays, 46 yards, 7:23.
- VAN – Brock Taylor 45-yard field goal, 6:26. Auburn 21–15. Drive: 9 plays, 51 yards, 3:13.

Statistics	VAN	AUB
First downs	22	15
Plays–yards	75–311	58–279
Rushes–yards	41–112	31–139
Passing yards	199	140
Passing: comp–att–int	22–34–1	18–27–1
Turnovers	1	1
Time of possession	37:28	22:32

Team	Category	Player	Statistics
Vanderbilt	Passing	Jared Curtis	22/33, 199 yards, INT
Vanderbilt	Rushing	Jared Curtis	18 rushes, 46 yards
Vanderbilt	Receiving	Junior Sherrill	6 receptions, 95 yards
Auburn	Passing	Byrum Brown	18/27, 140 yards, TD, INT
Auburn	Rushing	Jeremiah Cobb	8 rushes, 58 yards
Auburn	Receiving	Chas Nimrod	5 receptions, 52 yards, TD

=== at No. 17 Tennessee (rivalry) ===
Auburn Tigers (3–1) at No. 17 Tennessee Volunteers (3–1) – Game summary

Quarter	1	2	3	4	Total
Tigers	0	7	0	7	14
No. 17 Volunteers	0	3	14	7	24

at Neyland Stadium • Knoxville, Tennessee

- Date: October 3
- Game time: 2:35 p.m. CDT
- Game weather: Cloudy • Temperature: 80 °F (27 °C) • Wind: N 5 miles per hour (8.0 km/h)
- Game attendance: 101,915
- Referee: Steve Marlowe
- TV announcers (ESPN): Bob Wischusen, Louis Riddick and Stormy Buonantony
- Recap

Game information

First quarter

No scoring

Second quarter

- TENN – Cooper Ranvier 36-yard field goal, 9:51. Tennessee 3–0. Drive: 10 plays, 24 yards, 4:55.
- AUB – Byrum Brown 7-yard rush (Alex McPherson kick), 3:48. Auburn 7–3. Drive: 4 plays, 19 yards, 1:13.

Third quarter

- TENN – DeSean Bishop 25-yard rush (Cooper Ranvier kick), 8:49. Tennessee 10–7. Drive: 6 plays, 82 yards, 2:46.
- TENN – DeSean Bishop 44-yard rush (Cooper Ranvier kick), 5:15. Tennessee 17–7. Drive: 1 play, 44 yards, 0:10.

Fourth quarter

- AUB – Arlis Boardingham 16-yard pass from Byrum Brown (Alex McPherson kick), 10:57. Tennessee 17–14. Drive: 4 plays, 94 yards, 1:06.
- TENN – DeSean Bishop 5-yard rush (Cooper Ranvier kick), 3:30. Tennessee 24–14. Drive: 5 plays, 24 yards, 3:04.

Statistics	AUB	TENN
First downs	17	17
Plays–yards	65–345	67–323
Rushes–yards	32–186	49–237
Passing yards	159	86
Passing: comp–att–int	22–33–2	11–18–1
Turnovers	3	2
Time of possession	28:23	31:37

Team	Category	Player	Statistics
Auburn	Passing	Byrum Brown	22/33, 159 yards, TD, 2 INT
Auburn	Rushing	Byrum Brown	19 rushes, 107 yards, TD
Auburn	Receiving	Keshaun Singleton	7 receptions, 54 yards
Tennessee	Passing	George MacIntyre	8/10, 86 yards
Tennessee	Rushing	DeSean Bishop	34 rushes, 220 yards, 3 TD
Tennessee	Receiving	Mike Matthews	4 receptions, 57 yards

=== at No. 1 Georgia (Deep South's Oldest Rivalry) ===
Auburn Tigers (3–2) at No. 1 Georgia Bulldogs (6–0) – Game summary

Quarter	1	2	3	4	Total
Tigers	7	10	7	3	27
No. 1 Bulldogs	14	0	0	10	24

at Sanford Stadium • Athens, Georgia

- Date: October 17
- Game time: 2:35 p.m. CDT
- Game weather: Sunny • Temperature: 70 °F (21 °C) • Wind: NE 13 miles per hour (21 km/h)
- Game attendance: 93,033
- Referee: Daniel Gautreaux
- TV announcers (ESPN): Dave Pasch, Dusty Dvoracek and Taylor McGregor
- Recap

Game information

First quarter

- UGA – Dwight Phillips Jr. 15-yard rush (Peyton Woodring kick), 12:03. Georgia 7–0. Drive: 5 plays, 75 yards, 2:57.
- UGA – Lawson Luckie 24-yard pass from Gunner Stockton (Peyton Woodring kick), 6:49. Georgia 14–0. Drive: 7 plays, 89 yards, 3:25.
- AUB – Keshaun Singleton 24-yard pass from Byrum Brown (Alex McPherson kick), 3:07. Georgia 14–7. Drive: 9 plays, 75 yards, 3:42.

Second quarter

- AUB – Chas Nimrod 9-yard pass from Byrum Brown (Alex McPherson kick), 6:32. Tied 14–14. Drive: 11 plays, 64 yards, 4:06.
- AUB – Alex McPherson 49-yard field goal, 1:20. Auburn 17–14. Drive: 10 plays, 33 yards, 3:10.

Third quarter

- AUB – Byrum Brown 5-yard rush (Alex McPherson kick), 11:28. Auburn 24–14. Drive: 9 plays, 76 yards, 3:27.

Fourth quarter

- UGA – Peyton Woodring 42-yard field goal, 14:15. Auburn 24–17. Drive: 14 plays, 49 yards, 7:02.
- UGA – London Humphreys 4-yard pass from Gunner Stockton (Peyton Woodring kick), 2:58. Tied 24–24. Drive: 13 plays, 94 yards, 5:16.
- AUB – Alex McPherson 34-yard field goal, 0:00. Auburn 27–24. Drive: 5 plays, 40 yards, 0:58.

Statistics	AUB	UGA
First downs	23	24
Plays–yards	74–366	65–440
Rushes–yards	46–192	28–113
Passing yards	174	327
Passing: comp–att–int	16–28–0	25–37–2
Turnovers	0	3
Time of possession	29:33	30:27

Team	Category	Player	Statistics
Auburn	Passing	Byrum Brown	15/26, 150 yards, TD
Auburn	Rushing	Byrum Brown	26 rushes, 115 yards, TD
Auburn	Receiving	Chas Nimrod	6 receptions, 60 yards, TD
Georgia	Passing	Gunner Stockton	22/34, 272 yards, 2 TD, 2 INT
Georgia	Rushing	Dwight Phillips Jr.	10 rushes, 68 yards, TD
Georgia	Receiving	Craig Dandridge	4 receptions, 88 yards

=== No. 18 LSU (rivalry) ===
No. 18 LSU Tigers (5–2) at Auburn Tigers (4–2) – Game summary

Quarter	1	2	3	4	Total
No. 18 LSU	10	21	0	7	38
Auburn	3	7	0	7	17

at Jordan–Hare Stadium • Auburn, Alabama

- Date: October 24
- Game time: 11:07 a.m. CDT
- Game weather: Sunny • Temperature: 65 °F (18 °C) • Wind: NE at 12 miles per hour (19 km/h)
- Game attendance: 88,043
- Referee: James Carter
- TV announcers (ABC): Sean McDonough, Greg McElroy and Katie George

Game information

First quarter
Second quarter
Third quarter
Fourth quarter

Statistics	LSU	AUB
First downs	29	16
Plays–yards	80–552	65–271
Rushes–yards	34–165	35–67
Passing yards	387	204
Passing: comp–att–int	32–46–0	20–30–0
Turnovers	0	0
Time of possession	33:41	26:19

Team	Category	Player	Statistics
LSU	Passing	Sam Leavitt	32/45, 387 yards, 3 TD
LSU	Rushing	Dilin Jones	21 carries, 92 yards, TD
LSU	Receiving	Jackson Harris	9 receptions, 178 yards, 2 TD
Auburn	Passing	Byrum Brown	15/24, 160 yards
Auburn	Rushing	Byrum Brown	19 carries, 21 yards, TD
Auburn	Receiving	Keshaun Singleton	4 receptions, 64 yards

=== at No. 12 Ole Miss (rivalry) ===
Auburn Tigers (4–3) at No. 12 Ole Miss Rebels (5–2) – Game summary

Quarter	1	2	3	4	Total
Tigers	0	9	6	0	15
No. 12 Rebels	0	14	10	21	45

at Vaught–Hemingway Stadium • Oxford, Mississippi

- Date: October 31
- Game time: 11:47 a.m. CDT
- Game weather: Cloudy • Temperature: 72 °F (22 °C) • Wind: SE 8 miles per hour (13 km/h)
- Game attendance: 67,041
- Referee: Jason Autrey
- TV announcers (SECN): Matt Schumacker, Aaron Murray and Taylor Davis
- Recap

Game information

First quarter

- No scoring plays

Second quarter

- MISS – Will Echoles 1-yard rush (Lucas Carneiro kick), 14:57. Ole Miss 7–0. Drive: 17 plays, 89 yards, 6:59.
- AUB – Chas Nimrod 21-yard pass from Byrum Brown (Alex McPherson kick blocked), 7:59. Ole Miss 7–6. Drive: 14 plays, 75 yards, 6:58.
- MISS – Shekai Mills-Knight 1-yard rush (Lucas Carneiro kick), 2:26. Ole Miss 14–6. Drive: 14 plays, 86 yards, 4:53.
- AUB – Alex McPherson 29-yard field goal, 0:05. Ole Miss 14–9. Drive: 11 plays, 64 yards, 2:21.

Third quarter

- MISS – Lucas Carneiro 20-yard field goal, 9:46. Ole Miss 17–9. Drive: 11 plays, 57 yards, 4:09.
- AUB – Byrum Brown 7-yard rush (Byrum Brown pass failed), 6:20. Ole Miss 17–15. Drive: 10 plays, 75 yards, 3:26.
- MISS – Trinidad Chambliss 26-yard rush (Lucas Carneiro kick), 3:25. Ole Miss 24–15. Drive: 8 plays, 75 yards, 2:55.

Fourth quarter

- MISS – Caleb Cunningham 6-yard pass from Trinidad Chambliss (Lucas Carneiro kick), 12:53. Ole Miss 31–15. Drive: 11 plays, 72 yards, 3:58.
- MISS – Horatio Fields 28-yard pass from Trinidad Chambliss (Lucas Carneiro kick), 10:23. Ole Miss 38–15. Drive: 3 plays, 42 yards, 0:58.
- MISS – Deuce Knight 17-yard rush (Lucas Carneiro kick), 3:27. Ole Miss 45–15. Drive: 9 plays, 56 yards, 4:21.

Statistics	AUB	MISS
First downs	24	30
Plays–yards	70–312	84–487
Rushes–yards	27–63	49–224
Passing yards	249	263
Passing: comp–att–int	29–43–0	22–35–1
Turnovers	2	1
Time of possession	27:22	32:38

Team	Category	Player	Statistics
Auburn	Passing	Byrum Brown	25/38, 195 yards, TD
Auburn	Rushing	Jeremiah Cobb	7 rushes, 35 yards
Auburn	Receiving	Christian Neptune	5 receptions, 53 yards
Ole Miss	Passing	Trinidad Chambliss	22/34, 263 yards, 2 TD, INT
Ole Miss	Rushing	Shekai Mills-Knight	16 rushes, 71 yards, TD
Ole Miss	Receiving	Horatio Fields	6 receptions, 73 yards, TD

=== Arkansas ===
Arkansas Razorbacks (3–5) at Auburn Tigers (4–4) – Game summary

Quarter	1	2	3	4	Total
Razorbacks	3	7	3	10	23
Tigers	0	3	6	17	26

at Jordan–Hare Stadium • Auburn, Alabama

- Date: November 7
- Game time: 11:47 a.m. CST
- Game weather: Sunny • Temperature: 63 °F (17 °C) • Wind: NW 8 miles per hour (13 km/h)
- Game attendance: 88,043
- Referee: Ted Pitts
- TV announcers (SECN): Taylor Zarzour, Matt Stinchcomb and Michella Chester
- Recap

Game information

First quarter

- ARK – Max Gilbert 38-yard field goal, 2:28. Arkansas 3–0. Drive: 12 plays, 57 yards, 6:09.

Second quarter

- ARK – Braylen Russell 2-yard rush (Max Gilbert kick), 11:21. Arkansas 10–0. Drive: 4 plays, 66 yards, 1:13.
- AUB – Alex McPherson 33-yard field goal, 0:03. Arkansas 10–3. Drive: 9 plays, 57 yards, 1:44.

Third quarter

- AUB – Chas Nimrod 15-yard pass from Byrum Brown (Alex McPherson kick failed), 5:01. Arkansas 10–9. Drive: 12 plays, 67 yards, 5:01.
- ARK – Max Gilbert 37-yard field goal, 1:36. Arkansas 13–9. Drive: 6 plays, 56 yards, 3:25.

Fourth quarter

- AUB – Byrum Brown 5-yard rush (Alex McPherson kick), 12:50. Auburn 16–13. Drive: 12 plays, 75 yards, 3:46.
- ARK – Max Gilbert 46-yard field goal, 9:32. Tied 16–16. Drive: 8 plays, 44 yards, 3:12.
- AUB – Keshaun Singleton 28-yard pass from Byrum Brown (Alex McPherson kick), 3:56. Auburn 23–16. Drive: 4 plays, 65 yards, 1:53.
- ARK – Antonio Jordan 23-yard pass from KJ Jackson (Max Gilbert kick), 1:54. Tied 23–23. Drive: 5 plays, 75 yards, 2:02.
- AUB – Alex McPherson 43-yard field goal, 0:33. Auburn 26–23. Drive: 10 plays, 50 yards, 1:21.

Statistics	ARK	AUB
First downs	20	21
Plays–yards	74–352	74–363
Rushes–yards	44–172	40–183
Passing yards	180	180
Passing: comp–att–int	14–30–1	23–34–0
Turnovers	2	0
Time of possession	33:16	26:44

Team	Category	Player	Statistics
Arkansas	Passing	KJ Jackson	14/30, 180 yards, TD, INT
Arkansas	Rushing	Cam Settles	16 rushes, 100 yards
Arkansas	Receiving	Chris Marshall	5 receptions, 65 yards
Auburn	Passing	Byrum Brown	23/34, 180 yards, 2 TD
Auburn	Rushing	Byrum Brown	23 rushes, 120 yards, TD
Auburn	Receiving	Keshaun Singleton	6 receptions, 58 yards, TD

=== at Mississippi State ===
Auburn Tigers (5–4) at Mississippi State Bulldogs (4–5) – Game summary

Quarter	1	2	3	4	Total
Tigers	10	17	14	0	41
Bulldogs	0	7	0	2	9

at Davis Wade Stadium • Starkville, Mississippi

- Date: November 14
- Game time: 3:20 p.m. CST
- Game weather: Sunny • Temperature: 56 °F (13 °C) • Wind: NE 6 miles per hour (9.7 km/h)
- Game attendance: 49,275
- Referee: David Smith
- TV announcers (SECN): Lowell Galindo, Kirk Morrison and Dawn Davenport
- Recap

Game information

First quarter

- AUB – Keshaun Singleton 26-yard pass from Byrum Brown (Alex McPherson kick), 8:39. Auburn 7–0. Drive: 3 plays, 38 yards, 0:50.
- AUB – Alex McPherson 37-yard field goal, 1:44. Auburn 10–0. Drive: 10 plays, 61 yards, 4:06.

Second quarter

- MSST – Sanfrisco Magee 34-yard pass from AJ Swann (Kyle Ferrie kick), 14:51. Auburn 10–7. Drive: 6 plays, 75 yards, 1:53.
- AUB – Byrum Brown 1-yard rush (Alex McPherson kick), 6:52. Auburn 17–7. Drive: 1 play, 1 yards, 0:05.
- AUB – Jeremiah Cobb 10-yard rush (Alex McPherson kick), 4:23. Auburn 24–7. Drive: 4 plays, 21 yards, 1:31.
- AUB – Alex McPherson 31-yard field goal, 0:00. Auburn 27–7. Drive: 8 plays, 33 yards, 1:21.

Third quarter

- AUB – Chas Nimrod 35-yard pass from Byrum Brown (Alex McPherson kick), 9:16. Auburn 34–7. Drive: 4 plays, 54 yards, 0:54.
- AUB – Keshaun Singleton 42-yard pass from Byrum Brown (Alex McPherson kick), 5:52. Auburn 41–7. Drive: 5 plays, 74 yards, 1:51.

Fourth quarter

- MSST – AUB safety, 13:54. Auburn 41–9.

Statistics	AUB	MSST
First downs	21	16
Plays–yards	71–371	74–262
Rushes–yards	43–142	46–46
Passing yards	229	216
Passing: comp–att–int	20–28–1	17–28–0
Turnovers	1	4
Time of possession	29:55	30:05

Team	Category	Player	Statistics
Auburn	Passing	Byrum Brown	19/26, 232 yards, 3 TD, INT
Auburn	Rushing	Jeremiah Cobb	10 rushes, 50 yards, TD
Auburn	Receiving	Keshaun Singleton	7 receptions, 103 yards, 2 TD
Mississippi State	Passing	Parker Puckett	10/14, 68 yards
Mississippi State	Rushing	Fluff Bothwell	12 rushes, 36 yards
Mississippi State	Receiving	Anthony Evans III	4 receptions, 89 yards

=== Samford (FCS) ===
Samford Bulldogs (4–7) at Auburn Tigers (6–4) – Game summary

Quarter	1	2	3	4	Total
Bulldogs (FCS)	3	0	7	7	17
Tigers	14	38	0	7	59

at Jordan–Hare Stadium • Auburn, Alabama

- Date: November 21
- Game time: 2:35 p.m. CST
- Game weather: Cloudy • Temperature: 62 °F (17 °C) • Wind: NE 12 miles per hour (19 km/h)
- Game attendance: 88,043
- Referee: Steve Marlowe
- TV announcers (SECN): Dave Neal, Cole Cubelic and Tori Petry
- Recap

Game information

First quarter

- AUB – Jeremiah Cobb 62-yard rush (Alex McPherson kick), 14:48. Auburn 7–0. Drive: 1 play, 62 yards, 0:12.
- SAM – Ty Ippolito 30-yard field goal, 9:28. Auburn 7–3. Drive: 12 plays, 63 yards, 5:21.
- AUB – Chas Nimrod 63-yard pass from Byrum Brown (Alex McPherson kick), 9:13. Auburn 14–3. Drive: 1 play, 63 yards, 0:09.

Second quarter

- AUB – Keshaun Singleton 35-yard pass from Tristan Ti'a (Alex McPherson kick), 14:53. Auburn 21–3. Drive: 5 plays, 46 yards, 1:53.
- AUB – Tristan Ti'a 1-yard rush (Alex McPherson kick), 12:05. Auburn 28–3. Drive: 4 plays, 44 yards, 1:01.
- AUB – Keshaun Singleton 33-yard pass from Tristan Ti'a (Alex McPherson kick), 9:23. Auburn 35–3. Drive: 3 plays, 62 yards, 1:04.
- AUB – Jeremiah Cobb 47-yard pass from Tristan Ti'a (Alex McPherson kick), 4:09. Auburn 42–3. Drive: 5 plays, 74 yards, 1:46.
- AUB – Keshaun Singleton 28-yard pass from Tristan Ti'a (Alex McPherson kick), 0:13. Auburn 49–3. Drive: 3 plays, 83 yards, 0:24.
- AUB – Alex McPherson 40-yard field goal, 0:00. Auburn 52–3. Drive: 3 plays, 31 yards, 0:11.

Third quarter

- SAM – Marquise Henderson 9-yard pass from Will Shields (Ty Ippolito kick), 3:37. Auburn 52–10. Drive: 8 plays, 78 yards, 4:26.

Fourth quarter

- SAM – Nicholas Bookman 25-yard pass from Charlie Gilliam (Ty Ippolito kick), 12:28. Auburn 52–17. Drive: 9 plays, 83 yards, 3:23.
- AUB – Jonathan Echols 6-yard pass from Rhys Brush (Alex McPherson kick), 7:59. Auburn 59–17. Drive: 12 plays, 68 yards, 4:29.

Statistics	SAM	AUB
First downs	21	26
Plays–yards	75–332	61–672
Rushes–yards	32–88	30–192
Passing yards	244	480
Passing: comp–att–int	23–43–0	28–31–0
Turnovers	0	1
Time of possession	38:02	21:58

Team	Category	Player	Statistics
Samford	Passing	Will Shields	15/32, 138 yards, TD
Samford	Rushing	Ken Cherry	14 rushes, 64 yards
Samford	Receiving	Marquise Henderson	5 receptions, 75 yards, TD
Auburn	Passing	Tristan Ti'a	17/18, 341 yards, 4 TD
Auburn	Rushing	Jeremiah Cobb	10 rushes, 120 yards, TD
Auburn	Receiving	Chas Nimrod	7 receptions, 157 yards, TD

=== at Alabama (Iron Bowl) ===
Auburn Tigers (7–4) at Alabama Crimson Tide (9–2) – Game summary

Quarter	1	2	3	4	Total
Tigers	0	0	0	0	0
Crimson Tide	0	0	0	0	0

at Bryant–Denny Stadium • Tuscaloosa, Alabama

- Date: November 28
- Game time: 6:30 p.m. CST
- TV announcers (ABC): Chris Fowler, Kirk Herbstreit and Holly Rowe

Game information

First quarter
Second quarter
Third quarter
Fourth quarter

Statistics	AUB	ALA
First downs		
Plays–yards		
Rushes–yards		
Passing yards		
Passing: comp–att–int		
Turnovers		
Time of possession		

Team	Category	Player	Statistics
Auburn	Passing		
Auburn	Rushing		
Auburn	Receiving		
Alabama	Passing		
Alabama	Rushing		
Alabama	Receiving		

== Personnel ==
=== Coaching staff ===
Name	Position	Consecutive season in current position
Alex Golesh	Head coach	1st
Joel Gordon	Offensive coordinator/Quarterbacks coach	1st
Kodi Burns	Associate head coach/Co-offensive coordinator/Wide receivers coach	1st
D. J. Durkin	Defensive coordinator/Inside linebackers coach	3rd
Tim Banks	Co-defensive coordinator/Safeties coach	1st
Jacob Bronowski	Special teams coordinator	1st
Larry Porter	Running backs coach	1st
Larry Scott	Tight ends coach	1st
Tyler Hudanick	Offensive line coach	1st
Vontrell King-Williams	Defensive line coach	3rd
Coleman Hutzler	Bucks/Edges coach	1st
Brad Wilson	Outside linebackers coach	1st
DeMarcus Van Dyke	Cornerbacks coach	1st
