= 2026 South Florida Bulls football team =

American college football season

2026 South Florida Bulls football
- Conference: American Conference
- Record: 6–5 (2–5 American)
- Head coach: Brian Hartline (1st season)
- Offensive coordinator: Tim Beck (1st season; games 1–11)
- Offensive scheme: Power spread
- Defensive coordinator: Josh Aldridge (1st season)
- Base defense: Multiple 3–4
- Home stadium: Raymond James Stadium

2026 American Conference football standings
	Conf.			Overall
Team	W		L	W		L
UTSA	6	–	1	9	–	2
Memphis	5	–	2	8	–	3
East Carolina	5	–	2	7	–	4
North Texas	5	–	2	7	–	4
UAB	4	–	3	6	–	5
Army	4	–	3	5	–	5
Tulsa	4	–	3	7	–	4
Florida Atlantic	4	–	3	7	–	4
Tulane	4	–	3	6	–	5
Navy	3	–	4	4	–	6
South Florida	2	–	5	6	–	5
Rice	1	–	6	2	–	9
Charlotte	1	–	6	1	–	10
Temple	1	–	6	2	–	9
Championship: December 5, 2026
As of November 22, 2026; Rankings from AP poll

The 2026 South Florida Bulls football team represents the University of South Florida (USF) as member of the American Conference during the 2026 NCAA Division I FBS football season. Led by first-year head coach Brian Hartline, the Bulls play home games at Raymond James Stadium in Tampa, Florida.

== Offseason ==
=== Transfers ===
==== Outgoing ====
Player	Position	Destination
Cole Best	IOL	Auburn
Byrum Brown	QB	Auburn
Nykahi Davenport	RB	Auburn
Jonathan Echols	TE	Auburn
Fred Gaskin III	S	Auburn
Locklan Hewlett	QB	Auburn
Gavin Jenkins	CB	Auburn
Jeremiah Koger	WR	Auburn
Christian Neptune	WR	Auburn
Chas Nimrod	WR	Auburn
Kory Pettigrew	WR	Auburn
Cole Skinner	IOL	Auburn
Keshaun Singleton	WR	Auburn
Jaylen Johnson	RB	Bethune–Cookman
Brandon Winton	WR	East Tennessee State
Jonas Duclona	CB	Georgia Tech
Khalil Walker	IOL	Hawaii
Rocco Nicholl	LB	Kent State
Adam Zouagui	K	Kentucky
Izaiah Guy	CB	Liberty
Boogsie Silvera	S	Sacramento State
Jarvis Lee	CB	SMU
Ira Singleton	EDGE	SMU
Derrick McCormick Jr.	LB	South Carolina State
Marcelis Tate	QB	Tennessee State
Kajuan Banks	CB	Tulane
James Chenault	CB	Utah
Tyreek Major	IOL	Western Kentucky
Dinellson Exume	DL	Unknown
Dorian Mallary Jr.	CB	Unknown
Traevon Mitchell	DL	Unknown
K'wan Powell	RB	Unknown
Tyler Williams	WR	Unknown
Alvon Isaac	RB	Withdrawn

==== Incoming ====
Player	Position	Previous school
Michael Wooten	IOL	Arizona
A'mon Lane-Ganus	CB	Auburn
Tayvion Beasley	CB	BYU
Ethan Green	OT	Cincinnati
Julius Tate	IOL	Coastal Carolina
Armani Winfield	WR	Colorado State
D.J. Crowther	RB	Dartmouth
Terry Simmons Jr.	DL	Duke
Teddy Foster	CB	Florida
Grayson Howard	LB	Florida
Luke Clyburn	TE	Furman
Caleb Cook	IOL	Georgia Southern
Ayden Jackson	S	Georgia Southern
Amarion Fortenberry	CB	Kansas State
Jayden Bradford	QB	Liberty
Michael Van Buren Jr.	QB	LSU
Za'Quan Bryan	CB	Minnesota
Jaron Glover	WR	Mississippi State
Luke Kromenhoek	QB	Mississippi State
Cash Hudson	IOL	Missouri State
Jason Collins Jr.	RB	Morgan State
Kahari Finley	OT	Morgan State
Jaylin Acevedo	OT	Navy
Major Dillard	DL	Norfolk State
Malcolm Ziglar	S	North Carolina
C. J. Hicks	EDGE	Ohio State
Bryson Rodgers	WR	Ohio State
Kade Caton	TE	Oregon
Shamar Meikle	EDGE	Oregon State
Arhmad Branch	WR	Purdue
Sam Robinson	LB	Rutgers
JR Rosenberg	S	Texas A&M
KJ Cooper	QB	Texas Southern
Kenny Odom	WR	UTEP
Terrell Jones	DL	Virginia
Cameron Seldon	WR	Virginia Tech
Don Volante	LS	West Florida
Israel Boyce	S	West Virginia
Marshon Oxley	EDGE	West Virginia
Asani Redwood	DL	West Virginia
Lawson Thorn	K	Wingate

== Schedule ==
Date	Time	Opponent	Site	TV	Result	Attendance
September 5	7:00 p.m.	FIU*	Raymond James Stadium; Tampa, FL	ESPN+	W 19–9	41,847
September 12	12:00 p.m.	at Army	Michie Stadium; West Point, NY	CBSSN	W 28–24	23,670
September 19	7:00 p.m.	Delaware State*	Raymond James Stadium; Tampa, FL	ESPN+	W 59–17	32,345
September 26	5:00 p.m.	at Bowling Green*	Doyt Perry Stadium; Bowling Green, OH	ESPN+	W 14–6	22,265
October 3	7:30 p.m.	Temple	Raymond James Stadium; Tampa, FL	ESPNU	L 13–17	36,349
October 8	7:30 p.m.	at UTSA	Alamodome; San Antonio, TX	ESPN	L 24–31	17,632
October 17	7:00 p.m.	Kent State*^{†}	Raymond James Stadium; Tampa, FL	ESPN+	W 29–2	31,384
October 31	12:00 p.m.	UAB	Raymond James Stadium; Tampa, FL	ESPNU	W 30–10	22,829
November 6	7:30 p.m.	at East Carolina	Dowdy–Ficklen Stadium; Greenville, NC	ESPN2	L 17–20	33,708
November 12	8:00 p.m.	Memphis	Raymond James Stadium; Tampa, FL	ESPN	L 41–52	
November 21	2:30 p.m.	at Florida Atlantic	Flagler Credit Union Stadium; Boca Raton, FL	ESPN+	L 14–35	18,881
November 28	3:30 p.m.	Tulane	Raymond James Stadium; Tampa, FL	ESPN+		
*Non-conference game; ^{†}Homecoming; All times are in Eastern time

== Game summaries ==
=== FIU ===
FIU Panthers (0–0) at South Florida Bulls (0–0) – Game summary

Quarter	1	2	3	4	Total
Panthers	0	0	3	6	9
Bulls	3	3	0	13	19

at Raymond James Stadium • Tampa, Florida

- Date: September 5
- Game time: 7:00 p.m. EDT
- Game weather: Sunny • Temperature: 93 °F (34 °C)
- Game attendance: 41,847
- Referee: Edwin Lee
- TV announcers (ESPN+): AJ Ricketts (play-by-play), Patrick Murray (analyst) and Maria Trivelpiece (sideline)

Game information

First quarter

- USF – Nico Gramatica 37-yard field goal, 0:00. Bulls 3–0. Drive: 10 plays, 39 yards, 5:27.

Second quarter

- USF – Nico Gramatica 53-yard field goal, 10:26. Bulls 6–0. Drive: 6 plays, 15 yards, 2:42.

Third quarter

- FIU – Robert Czeremcha 29-yard field goal, 9:04. Bulls 6–3. Drive: 14 plays, 63 yards, 5:56.

Fourth quarter

- USF – D. J. Crowther 1-yard run (Nico Gramatica kick), 13:07. Bulls 13–3. Drive: 9 plays, 35 yards, 5:25.
- USF – Nico Gramatica 30-yard field goal, 7:03. Bulls 16–3. Drive: 9 plays, 24 yards, 4:08.
- USF – Nico Gramatica 29-yard field goal, 1:44. Bulls 19–3. Drive: 7 plays, 29 yards, 2:33.
- FIU – James Resar 21-yard pass from JJ Kohl, 0:00. Bulls 19–9. Drive: 7 plays, 87 yards, 1:40.

Statistics	FIU	USF
First downs	19	14
Plays–yards	75–381	56–208
Rushes–yards	25–80	38–108
Passing yards	301	100
Passing: comp–att–int	31–50–2	11–18–0
Turnovers	3	0
Time of possession	29:51	30:09

Team	Category	Player	Statistics
FIU	Passing	JJ Kohl	31/50, 301 yards, TD, 2 INT
FIU	Rushing	JJ Kohl	6 carries, 31 yards
FIU	Receiving	Maguire Anderson	8 receptions, 87 yards
South Florida	Passing	Michael Van Buren Jr.	11/18, 100 yards
South Florida	Rushing	Jason Collins Jr.	17 carries, 59 yards
South Florida	Receiving	Arhmad Branch	5 receptions, 47 yards

=== at Army ===
South Florida Bulls (1–0) at Army Black Knights (1–0) – Game summary

Quarter	1	2	3	4	Total
Bulls	7	0	7	14	28
Black Knights	0	14	0	10	24

at Michie Stadium • West Point, New York

- Date: September 12
- Game time: 12:00 p.m. EDT
- Game weather: Sunny • Temperature: 73 °F (23 °C) • Wind: S at 6 miles per hour (9.7 km/h)
- Game attendance: 23,670
- Referee: Kevin Randall
- TV announcers (CBSSN): Jack Gordon, Taylor McHargue and Tina Cervasio

Game information

First quarter

- USF – Bryson Rodgers 7-yard pass from Michael Van Buren Jr. (Nico Gramatica kick), 11:00. Bulls 7–0. Drive: 7 plays, 75 yards, 4:00.

Second quarter

- ARMY – Zach Mundell 24-yard pass from Cale Hellums (Dawson Jones kick), 11:48. Tied 7–7. Drive: 11 plays, 90 yards, 6:14.
- ARMY – Godspower Nwawuihe 4-yard pass from Cale Hellums (Dawson Jones kick), 0:19. Black Knights 14–0. Drive: 19 plays, 92 yards, 9:57.

Third quarter

- USF – Michael Van Buren Jr. 18-yard run (Nico Gramatica kick), 9:03. Tied 14–14. Drive: 8 plays, 74 yards, 4:00.

Fourth quarter

- ARMY – Dawson Jones 27-yard field goal, 14:05. Black Knights 17–14. Drive: 9 plays, 44 yards, 4:16.
- ARMY – Godspeed Nwawuihe 10-yard run (Dawson Jones kick), 5:06. Black Knights 24–14. Drive: 9 plays, 80 yards, 5:57.
- USF – Michael Van Buren Jr. 24-yard run (Nico Gramatica kick), 3:20. Black Knights 24–21. Drive: 6 plays, 75 yards, 1:47.
- USF – Joshua Porter 38-yard pass from Michael Van Buren Jr. (Nico Gramatica kick), 0:23. Bulls 28–24. Drive: 10 plays, 81 yards, 1:27.

Statistics	USF	ARMY
First downs	21	21
Plays–yards	55–369	62–347
Rushes–yards	25–130	51–219
Passing yards	239	128
Passing: comp–att–int	19–30–1	10–11–0
Turnovers	0	1
Time of possession	24:14	35:46

Team	Category	Player	Statistics
South Florida	Passing	Michael Van Buren Jr.	19/30, 239 yards, 2 TD
South Florida	Rushing	Michael Van Buren Jr.	5 carries, 45 yards, 2 TD
South Florida	Receiving	Joshua Porter	3 receptions, 67 yards, TD
Army	Passing	Cale Hellums	9/10, 91 yards, 2 TD
Army	Rushing	Godspower Nwawuihe	20 carries, 94 yards, TD
Army	Receiving	Zach Mundell	3 receptions, 47 yards, TD

=== Delaware State (FCS) ===
Delaware State Hornets (FCS) (2–1) at South Florida Bulls (2–0) – Game summary

Quarter	1	2	3	4	Total
Hornets (FCS)	7	10	0	0	17
Bulls	14	14	14	17	59

at Raymond James Stadium • Tampa, Florida

- Date: September 19
- Game time: 7:00 p.m. EDT
- Game weather: Rain • Temperature: 90 °F (32 °C)
- Game attendance: 32,345
- Referee: Steven Anderson
- TV announcers (ESPN+): TJ Rives (play-by-play) and Henry Burris (analyst)

Statistics	DSU	USF
First downs	17	33
Plays–yards	58–353	66–611
Rushes–yards	31–103	31–290
Passing yards	250	321
Passing: comp–att–int	17–27–0	25–35–0
Turnovers	1	1
Time of possession	31:21	28:39

Team	Category	Player	Statistics
Delaware State	Passing	Ui Ale	16/22, 249 yards, 2 TD
Delaware State	Rushing	Ui Ale	4 carries, 49 yards
Delaware State	Receiving	Nathan Stewart	2 receptions, 102 yards, TD
South Florida	Passing	Michael Van Buren Jr.	23/32, 300 yards, TD
South Florida	Rushing	D. J. Crowther	8 carries, 101 yards, 3 TD
South Florida	Receiving	Joshua Parker	8 receptions, 106 yards, TD

=== at Bowling Green ===
South Florida Bulls (3–0) at Bowling Green Falcons (0–3) – Game summary

Quarter	1	2	3	4	Total
Bulls	0	0	0	14	14
Falcons	3	3	0	0	6

at Doyt Perry Stadium • Bowling Green, Ohio

- Date: September 26
- Game time: 5:00 p.m. EDT
- Game weather: Sunny • Temperature: 70 °F (21 °C) • Wind: NE at 9 miles per hour (14 km/h)
- Game attendance: 22,265
- Referee: Chris La Mange
- TV announcers (ESPN+): Kelsie Kasper and Ryan Cavanaugh

Game information

First quarter

- BGSU – Travis Kenner 43-yard field goal, 10:06. Falcons 3–0. Drive: 4 plays, 7 yards, 1:57.

Second quarter

- BGSU – Travis Kenner 28-yard field goal, 7:26. Falcons 6–0. Drive: 11 plays, 39 yards, 5:37.

Third quarter

- No scoring plays.

Fourth quarter

- USF – Luke Kromenhoek 2-yard run (Nico Gramatica kick), 12:07. Bulls 7–6. Drive: 6 plays, 44 yards, 2:50.
- USF – D. J. Crowther 1-yard run (Nico Gramatica kick), 5:34. Bulls 14–6. Drive: 6 plays, 72 yards, 2:43.

Statistics	USF	BGSU
First downs	16	14
Plays–yards	53–214	61–207
Rushes–yards	42–162	33–85
Passing yards	52	122
Passing: comp–att–int	7–11–0	16–28–0
Time of possession	27:26	32:34

Team	Category	Player	Statistics
South Florida	Passing	Michael Van Buren Jr.	7/11, 52 yards
South Florida	Rushing	D. J. Crowther	23 carries, 143 yards, TD
South Florida	Receiving	Bryson Rodgers	2 receptions, 22 yards
Bowling Green	Passing	Jay Kastantin	16/28, 122 yards
Bowling Green	Rushing	Austyn Dendy	18 carries, 48 yards
Bowling Green	Receiving	Winn Sharp	5 receptions, 56 yards

=== Temple ===
Temple Owls (1–3) at South Florida Bulls (4–0) – Game summary

Quarter	1	2	Total
Owls			0
Bulls			0

at Raymond James Stadium • Tampa, Florida

- Date: October 3
- Game time: TBD

Statistics	TEM	USF
First downs		
Plays–yards		
Rushes–yards		
Passing yards		
Passing: comp–att–int		
Time of possession		

Team	Category	Player	Statistics
Temple	Passing		
Temple	Rushing		
Temple	Receiving		
South Florida	Passing		
South Florida	Rushing		
South Florida	Receiving		

=== at UTSA ===
South Florida Bulls (4–1) at UTSA Roadrunners (4–1) – Game summary

Quarter	1	2	Total
Bulls			0
Roadrunners			0

at Alamodome • San Antonio, Texas

- Date: October 8
- Game time: 7:30 p.m. EDT
- TV: ESPN/ESPN2

Statistics	USF	UTSA
First downs		
Plays–yards		
Rushes–yards		
Passing yards		
Passing: comp–att–int		
Time of possession		

Team	Category	Player	Statistics
South Florida	Passing		
South Florida	Rushing		
South Florida	Receiving		
UTSA	Passing		
UTSA	Rushing		
UTSA	Receiving		

=== Kent State ===
Kent State Golden Flashes (2–4) at South Florida Bulls (4–2) – Game summary

Quarter	1	2	Total
Golden Flashes			0
Bulls			0

at Raymond James Stadium • Tampa, Florida

- Date: October 17
- Game time: TBD

Statistics	KENT	USF
First downs		
Plays–yards		
Rushes–yards		
Passing yards		
Passing: comp–att–int		
Time of possession		

Team	Category	Player	Statistics
Kent State	Passing		
Kent State	Rushing		
Kent State	Receiving		
South Florida	Passing		
South Florida	Rushing		
South Florida	Receiving		

=== UAB ===
UAB Blazers (4–3) at South Florida Bulls (5–2) – Game summary

Quarter	1	2	Total
Blazers			0
Bulls			0

at Raymond James Stadium • Tampa, Florida

- Date: October 31
- Game time: TBD

Statistics	UAB	USF
First downs		
Plays–yards		
Rushes–yards		
Passing yards		
Passing: comp–att–int		
Time of possession		

Team	Category	Player	Statistics
UAB	Passing		
UAB	Rushing		
UAB	Receiving		
South Florida	Passing		
South Florida	Rushing		
South Florida	Receiving		

=== at East Carolina ===
South Florida Bulls (6–2) at East Carolina Pirates (4–4) – Game summary

Quarter	1	2	Total
Bulls			0
Pirates			0

at Dowdy–Ficklen Stadium • Greenville, North Carolina

- Date: November 6
- Game time: 7:30 p.m. CST
- TV: ESPN2

Statistics	USF	ECU
First downs		
Plays–yards		
Rushes–yards		
Passing yards		
Passing: comp–att–int		
Time of possession		

Team	Category	Player	Statistics
South Florida	Passing		
South Florida	Rushing		
South Florida	Receiving		
East Carolina	Passing		
East Carolina	Rushing		
East Carolina	Receiving		

=== Memphis ===
Memphis Tigers (7–2) at South Florida Bulls (6–3) – Game summary

Quarter	1	2	Total
Tigers			0
Bulls			0

at Raymond James Stadium • Tampa, Florida

- Date: November 12
- Game time: 8:00 p.m. EST
- TV: ESPN

Statistics	MEM	USF
First downs		
Plays–yards		
Rushes–yards		
Passing yards		
Passing: comp–att–int		
Time of possession		

Team	Category	Player	Statistics
Memphis	Passing		
Memphis	Rushing		
Memphis	Receiving		
South Florida	Passing		
South Florida	Rushing		
South Florida	Receiving		

=== at Florida Atlantic ===
South Florida Bulls (6–4) at Florida Atlantic Owls (6–4) – Game summary

Quarter	1	2	Total
Bulls			0
Owls			0

at Flagler Credit Union Stadium • Boca Raton, Florida

- Date: November 21
- Game time: TBD

Statistics	USF	FAU
First downs		
Plays–yards		
Rushes–yards		
Passing yards		
Passing: comp–att–int		
Time of possession		

Team	Category	Player	Statistics
South Florida	Passing		
South Florida	Rushing		
South Florida	Receiving		
Florida Atlantic	Passing		
Florida Atlantic	Rushing		
Florida Atlantic	Receiving		

=== Tulane ===
Tulane Green Wave (6–5) at South Florida Bulls (6–5) – Game summary

Quarter	1	2	Total
Green Wave			0
Bulls			0

at Raymond James Stadium • Tampa, Florida

- Date: November 28
- Game time: TBD

Statistics	TULN	USF
First downs		
Plays–yards		
Rushes–yards		
Passing yards		
Passing: comp–att–int		
Time of possession		

Team	Category	Player	Statistics
Tulane	Passing		
Tulane	Rushing		
Tulane	Receiving		
South Florida	Passing		
South Florida	Rushing		
South Florida	Receiving		

== Personnel ==
=== Roster ===
2026 South Florida Bulls football team roster
Players
Coaches
Offense

Pos.	#	Name	Class
WR	0	Cameron Seldon	Sr
WR	1	Bryson Rodgers	Jr
RB	2	Jason Collins Jr.	Jr
QB	3	Michael Van Buren Jr.	Jr
WR	4	Arhmad Branch	Jr
RB	5	D. J. Crowther	Sr
WR	6	Mudia Reuben	GS
WR	7	Jaron Glover	Sr
TE	8	Wyatt Sullivan	Sr
WR	9	Armani Winfield	Sr
QB	10	KJ Cooper	Sr
WR	11	Dmari Roberts	Fr
WR	12	Jaden Alexis	GS
WR	14	Arkese Parks	So
RB	15	Alvon Isaac	So
QB	16	Jayden Bradford	So
QB	17	Luke Kromenhoek	So
WR	18	Kenny Odom	Sr
WR	19	JeyQuan Smith	Jr
RB	22	Chase Garnett	Fr
RB	24	Tray Kinkle	So
RB	25	Jayson Franklin	Fr
WR	27	Jayden Davis	Jr
TE	47	Evan Dangler	GS
OL	54	Braden Carter	So
OL	55	James Jenkins	Jr
OL	58	TJ Lawrence	So
OL	59	Devin Davis	GS
OL	60	Khalil Collins	Fr
OL	61	Julius Tate	So
OL	65	Jaylin Acevedo	So
OL	66	Teriyan Morman	So
OL	67	Thomas Shrader	GS
OL	70	Gerrick Gordon Jr.	Fr
OL	71	Kahari Finley	Sr
OL	72	Cash Hudson	Sr
OL	73	Caleb Harris	Fr
OL	74	Jordan Harrison	Fr
OL	76	Colin Bellomy	Fr
OL	77	Michael Wooten	Sr
OL	78	Caleb Cook	GS
OL	79	Ethan Green	Sr
WR	80	Joshua Porter	Jr
TE	81	Tayte Crable	Fr
WR	82	Gabe Legrand	Fr
TE	85	Kade Caton	So
TE	87	Luke Clyburn	GS
TE	88	Brandon Kubay	Fr
TE	89	Ryley Zalusky	Jr

Defense

Pos.	#	Name	Class
LB	0	Grayson Howard	Jr
DE	1	C. J. Hicks	GS
S	2	Tavin Ward	GS
CB	3	Za'Quan Bryan	Jr
DE	4	Michael Williams II	GS
DB	5	Ayden Jackson	Sr
LB	6	Rodney Hill	Jr
LB	7	Sam Robinson	So
CB	8	Amarion Fortenberry	Jr
S	9	Israel Boyce	Jr
LB	10	Shamar Meikle	Jr
DT	11	Asani Redwood	Sr
DB	12	Jabari Smith	So
S	13	Malcolm Ziglar	Jr
DE	14	Eli Jones	Fr
DB	15	Tayvion Beasley	Sr
CB	16	Teddy Foster	So
CB	17	Masiyah Limehouse	Fr
DE	18	Levi Smiley	So
DE	19	Peter Ramil
S	20	A'Mon Lane-Ganus	So
S	21	Victor Zidor	Sr
CB	22	Ja'Kyri Watson	Fr
S	23	Cedrick Hawkins Jr.	Jr
S	24	Amari Jones	Fr
LB	25	Zavier Hamilton	So
S	26	CJ Cresser Jr.	Fr
S	27	Jermichael Gillis	Fr
DT	28	Ryan Jenkins	Jr
CB	29	Deylen Platt	So
LB	30	Lorenzo Barnes	Fr
CB	31	Jair Murphy	Jr
LB	32	Demetrius Geathers Jr.	Fr
LB	33	Ashon Mosley	So
CB	34	Keyshaun Birks	Fr
CB	35	Herlin Perry Jr.	Fr
LB	36	DeAngelo Bowden	Fr
S	38	Derrick Nichols III	Fr
LB	40	Gavin Leach	So
DB	41	George Brown IV	So
LB	44	Dennis King III	Fr
LB	45	Marshon Oxley	Sr
DE	49	Harrysson Ngassa	So
LB	51	Michael Harris	Jr
LB	52	Christian Smith	Fr
LB	55	Greg Otten	Jr
DL	56	Terry Simmons Jr.	Jr
DT	77	Major Dillard	Sr
DE	90	Terrell Jones	Sr
DT	93	Richard Scott III	So
LB	94	Brooks Williams Jr.	Fr
DL	95	Iverson Garcia-Ponce	Fr
DT	96	Sager Quinn	Fr
DT	98	Marcus Williams	Fr
DL	99	Jahari Grant	Jr

Special teams

Pos.	#	Name	Class
K	7	Nico Gramatica	Jr
K	10	Gaston Gramatica	Fr
K	37	Lawson Thorn	Jr
P	39	Luke Goater	Fr
LS	48	Turner McLaughlin	So
LS	49	Easton Bonnett	So

Head coach

- Brian Hartline

Coordinators/assistant coaches

- Josh Aldridge (Defensive coordinator/inside linebackers)
- Tim Beck (Offensive coordinator)
- Sean Binckes (Tight ends)
- Elijah Brooks (Running backs)
- Chad Creamer (Special teams coordinator/outside linebackers)
- Mike Hartline (Quarterbacks)
- Keith Jones Jr. (Defensive line)
- Antwaine Richardson (Stars)
- James Rowe (Cornerbacks)
- Mike Sollenne (Run game coordinator/offensive line)
- Danny Verpaele (Safeties)
- Myles White (Wide receivers)

Legend

- (C) Team captain
- (S) Suspended
- (I) Ineligible
- Injured
- Redshirt

Roster
Last update: 27 September 2026
