= 2026 Southern Miss Golden Eagles football team =

American college football season

2026 Southern Miss Golden Eagles football
- Conference: Sun Belt Conference
- West Division
- Record: 3–8 (2–5 Sun Belt)
- Head coach: Blake Anderson (1st season)
- Offensive coordinator: Kyle Cefalo (1st season)
- Offensive scheme: Spread
- Defensive coordinator: Joe Bolden (1st season)
- Base defense: 4–2–5
- Home stadium: Renasant Stadium

2026 Sun Belt Conference football standings
	Conf.			Overall
Team	W		L	W		L
East Division
Georgia Southern	6	–	1	7	–	4
James Madison	5	–	2	8	–	3
Appalachian State	4	–	3	7	–	4
Coastal Carolina	3	–	4	4	–	7
Marshall	3	–	4	6	–	5
Georgia State	2	–	5	5	–	6
Old Dominion	2	–	5	3	–	8
West Division
Louisiana Tech xy	7	–	0	9	–	2
Louisiana	5	–	2	8	–	3
South Alabama	4	–	3	6	–	5
Arkansas State	2	–	5	4	–	7
Troy	2	–	5	4	–	7
Southern Miss	2	–	5	3	–	8
Louisiana–Monroe	2	–	5	2	–	9
Championship: TBD vs. Louisiana Tech
$ – Conference champion; x – Division champion/co-champions; y – Championship game participant; As of November 22, 2026; Rankings from AP poll

The 2026 Southern Miss Golden Eagles football team represents the University of Southern Mississippi in the Sun Belt Conference's West Division during the 2026 NCAA Division I FBS football season. The Golden Eagles are led by first-year head coach Blake Anderson. The Golden Eagles play their home games at Renasant Stadium, located in Hattiesburg, Mississippi.

== Preseason ==
=== Media poll ===
In the Sun Belt preseason coaches' poll, Southern Miss was picked to finish fifth place in the West Division.

== Schedule ==
Date	Time	Opponent	Site	TV	Result	Attendance
September 5	4:00 p.m.	Alcorn State*	Renasant Stadium; Hattiesburg, MS	ESPN+	W 49–3	26,246
September 12	6:45 p.m.	at Auburn*	Jordan–Hare Stadium; Auburn, AL	SECN	L 8–43	88,043
September 19	6:00 p.m.	UConn*	Renasant Stadium; Hattiesburg, MS	ESPN+	L 20–48	23,025
September 26	6:00 p.m.	at Tulane*	Yulman Stadium; New Orleans, LA (Battle for the Bell)	ESPN+	L 21–24	22,984
October 6	7:00 p.m.	at Troy	Veterans Memorial Stadium; Troy, AL	ESPN2	L 34–55	21,933
October 17	6:00 p.m.	Arkansas State	Renasant Stadium; Hattiesburg, MS	ESPN+	L 13–23	22,585
October 24	4:00 p.m.	Louisiana^{†}	Renasant Stadium; Hattiesburg, MS	ESPN+	W 35–31	23,244
October 31	2:30 p.m.	at Louisiana–Monroe	Malone Stadium; Monroe, LA	ESPN+	W 35–21	9,086
November 5	7:00 p.m.	James Madison	Renasant Stadium; Hattiesburg, MS	ESPN2	L 23–54	24,182
November 14	4:00 p.m.	at Louisiana Tech	Joe Aillet Stadium; Ruston, LA (Rivalry in Dixie)	ESPN+	L 31–63	15,423
November 21	3:00 p.m.	South Alabama	Renasant Stadium; Hattiesburg, MS	ESPN+	L 35–40	27,608
November 28	12:00 p.m.	at Old Dominion	S.B. Ballard Stadium; Norfolk, VA	ESPN+		
*Non-conference game; ^{†}Homecoming; All times are in Central time

== Game summaries ==
=== Alcorn State (FCS) ===
Alcorn State Braves (FCS) (1–0) at Southern Miss Golden Eagles (0–0) – Game summary

Quarter	1	2	3	4	Total
Braves (FCS)	3	0	0	0	3
Golden Eagles	7	14	21	7	49

at Renasant Stadium • Hattiesburg, Mississippi

- Date: September 5
- Game time: 4:00 p.m. CDT
- Game weather: Sunny, 94 °F (34 °C)
- Game attendance: 26,246
- Referee: Brian Holland
- TV announcers (ESPN+): Jason Baker (play-by-play) and Larry Boyd (analyst)

Game information

First quarter

- ALCN – Kenyon Bowyer 22-yard field goal, 5:52. Braves 3–0. Drive: 4 plays, 5 yards, 1:38.
- USM – Steven Robinson 2-yard run (Creighton Willbanks kick), 2:29. Golden Eagles 7–3. Drive: 10 plays, 75 yards, 3:23.

Second quarter

- USM – Mario Sanders 38-yard pass from Ethan Hampton (Creighton Willbanks kick), 10:55. Golden Eagles 14–3. Drive: 11 plays, 80 yards, 3:53.
- USM – Jamarice Wilder 2-yard run (Creighton Willbanks kick), 0:08. Golden Eagles 21–3. Drive: 13 plays, 97 yards, 4:41.

Third quarter

- USM – Steven Robinson 3-yard run (Creighton Willbanks kick), 11:12. Golden Eagles 28–3. Drive: 8 plays, 70 yards, 3:41.
- USM – Jamarice Wilder 29-yard run (Creighton Willbanks kick), 9:23. Golden Eagles 35–3. Drive: 2 plays, 42 yards, 0:19.
- USM – Steven Robinson 2-yard run (Creighton Willbanks kick), 2:00. Golden Eagles 42–3. Drive: 6 plays, 36 yards, 2:09.

Fourth quarter

- USM – Robert Henderson 1-yard run (Creighton Willbanks kick), 11:11. Golden Eagles 49–3. Drive: 9 plays, 76 yards, 3:51.

Statistics	ALCN	USM
First downs	11	32
Plays–yards	58–223	84–543
Rushes–yards	35–104	57–317
Passing yards	119	226
Passing: comp–att–int	15–23–4	15–27–1
Turnovers	5	1
Time of possession	28:39	31:21

Team	Category	Player	Statistics
Alcorn State	Passing	Jaylon Tolbert	15/22, 119 yards, 4 INT
Alcorn State	Rushing	Joshua Tate	8 carries, 33 yards
Alcorn State	Receiving	Tyree Kelly	3 receptions, 39 yards
Southern Miss	Passing	Ethan Hampton	13/23, 180 yards, TD, INT
Southern Miss	Rushing	Steven Robinson	23 carries, 123 yards, 3 TD
Southern Miss	Receiving	Mario Sanders	6 receptions, 94 yards, TD

=== at Auburn ===
Southern Miss Golden Eagles (1–0) at Auburn Tigers (1–0) – Game summary

Quarter	1	2	3	4	Total
Golden Eagles	0	8	0	0	8
Tigers	17	10	16	0	43

at Jordan–Hare Stadium • Auburn, Alabama

- Date: September 12
- Game time: 6:45 p.m. CDT
- Game weather: Sunny
- Game attendance: 88,043
- Referee: Tim Barker
- TV announcers (SECN): Matt Schumacker (play-by-play), Aaron Murray (analyst) and Taylor Davis (sideline)

Game information

First quarter

- AUB – Andre Jordan Jr. 29–yard interception return (Alex McPherson kick), 14:50. Auburn 7–0.
- AUB – Jonathan Echols 22–yard pass from Byrum Brown (Alex McPherson kick), 3:45. Auburn 10–0. Drive: 8 plays, 93 yards, 2:51.
- AUB – Alex McPherson 47-yard field goal, 1:31. Auburn 17–0. Drive: 5 plays, 30 yards, 0:48.

Second quarter

- AUB – DeShawn Spencer 8–yard pass from Byrum Brown (Alex McPherson kick), 6:40. Auburn 24–0. Drive: 8 plays, 85 yards, 3:08.
- USM – Steven Robinson 1–yard pass from Ethan Hampton (Jeremiah Beck Jr. pass from Ethan Hampton), 0:24. Auburn 24–8. Drive: 14 plays, 75 yards, 6:16.
- AUB – Alex McPherson 55-yard field goal, 0:00. Auburn 27–8. Drive: 4 plays, 33 yards, 0:19.

Third quarter

- AUB – Byrum Brown 5–yard pass from Christian Neptune (Alex McPherson kick), 9:56. Auburn 34–8. Drive: 12 plays, 65 yards, 4:57.
- AUB – Cody Sigler sack of Ethan Hampton for safety, 3:26. Auburn 36–8.
- AUB – Omar Mabson II 2–yard run (Alex McPherson kick), 0:09. Auburn 43–8. Drive: 10 plays, 64 yards, 3:09.

Fourth quarter

- No scoring plays.

Statistics	USM	AUB
First downs	11	31
Plays–yards	58–221	85–613
Rushes–yards	25–50	51–343
Passing yards	171	270
Passing: comp–att–int	22–33–2	21–34–0
Turnovers	2	1
Time of possession	27:11	32:49

Team	Category	Player	Statistics
Southern Miss	Passing	Ethan Hampton	18/27, 146 yards, TD, 2 INT
Southern Miss	Rushing	Steven Robinson	15 carries, 51 yards
Southern Miss	Receiving	AJ Little	4 receptions, 27 yards
Auburn	Passing	Byrum Brown	18/29, 226 yards, 2 TD
Auburn	Rushing	Omar Mabson II	15 carries, 108 yards, TD
Auburn	Receiving	Chas Nimrod	7 receptions, 52 yards

=== UConn ===
UConn Huskies (1–1) at Southern Miss Golden Eagles (1–1) – Game summary

Quarter	1	2	3	4	Total
Huskies	14	13	14	7	48
Golden Eagles	3	3	7	7	20

at Renasant Stadium • Hattiesburg, Mississippi

- Date: September 19
- Game time: 6:00 p.m. CDT
- Game weather: Sunny • Temperature: 95 °F (35 °C) • Wind: W 2 mph
- Game attendance: 23,025
- Referee: Tim Hedgepeth
- TV announcers (ESPN+): Jason Baker (play-by-play) and Larry Boyd (analyst)

Game information

First quarter

- CONN – Shamar Porter 38-yard pass from Kalieb Osborne (Jack O'Connor kick), 10:11. Huskies 7–0. Drive: 9 plays, 75 yards, 4:49.
- CONN – Kalieb Osborne 5-yard run (Jack O'Connor kick), 6:19. Huskies 14–0. Drive: 7 plays, 46 yards, 2:48.
- USM – Creighton Wilbanks 47-yard field goal, 0:30. Huskies 14–3. Drive: 10 plays, 51 yards, 2:49.

Second quarter

- CONN – Jack O'Connor 46-yard field goal, 11:05. Huskies 17–3. Drive: 11 plays, 47 yards, 4:23.
- CONN – Cyncir Bowers 42-yard run (Jack O'Connor kick), 8:47. Huskies 24–3. Drive: 3 plays, 63 yards, 1:06.
- USM – Creighton Wilbanks 34-yard field goal, 3:15. Huskies 24–6. Drive: 15 plays, 59 yards, 5:32.
- CONN – Jack O'Connor 29-yard field goal, 0:00. Huskies 27–6. Drive: 6 plays, 52 yards, 0:33.

Third quarter

- CONN – Trey Cornist 1-yard pass from Kalieb Osborne (Jack O'Connor kick), 7:26. Huskies 34–6. Drive: 11 plays, 59 yards, 6:01.
- CONN – Anas Luqman 24-yard interception return (Jack O'Connor kick), 7:17. Huskies 41–6. Drive: 1 play, 0 yards, 0:09.
- USM – Steven Robinson 1-yard run (Creighton Wilbanks kick), 5:53. Huskies 41–13. Drive: 4 plays, 75 yards, 1:24.

Fourth quarter

- CONN – Kalieb Osborne 11-yard run (Jack O'Connor kick), 8:16. Huskies 48–13. Drive: 5 plays, 51 yards, 2:46.
- USM – Jaylen Himes 10-yard pass from Landry Lyddy (Creighton Wilbanks kick), 0:23. Huskies 48–20. Drive: 7 plays, 80 yards, 1:55.

Statistics	CONN	USM
First downs	24	21
Plays–yards	71-436	78-401
Rushes–yards	46-213	27-102
Passing yards	223	299
Passing: comp–att–int	18-25-0	29-51-2
Turnovers	0	2
Time of possession	34:04	25:56

Team	Category	Player	Statistics
UConn	Passing	Kalieb Osborne	16/22, 214 yards, 2 TDs
UConn	Rushing	Cyncir Bowers	11 carries, 84 yards, TD
UConn	Receiving	Shamar Porter	2 receptions, 50 yards, TD
Southern Miss	Passing	Landry Lyddy	14/25, 194 yards, TD, INT
Southern Miss	Rushing	Steven Robinson	18 carries, 72 yards, TD
Southern Miss	Receiving	Mario Sanders	7 receptions, 81 yards

=== at Tulane (Battle for the Bell) ===
Southern Miss Golden Eagles (1–2) at Tulane Green Wave (1–2) – Game summary

Quarter	1	2	3	4	Total
Golden Eagles	0	0	0	0	0
Green Wave	0	0	0	0	0

at Yulman Stadium • New Orleans, Louisiana

- Date: September 26
- Game time: 6:00 p.m. CDT
- Game attendance: 22,984
- TV announcers (ESPN+): Jack Benjamin (play-by-play), Henry Burris (analyst) and Maria Trivelpiece (sideline)

Statistics	USM	TULN
First downs		
Plays–yards		
Rushes–yards		
Passing yards		
Passing: comp–att–int		
Time of possession		

Team	Category	Player	Statistics
Southern Miss	Passing		
Southern Miss	Rushing		
Southern Miss	Receiving		
Tulane	Passing		
Tulane	Rushing		
Tulane	Receiving		

=== at Troy ===
Southern Miss Golden Eagles (1–3) at Troy Trojans (2–2) – Game summary

Quarter	1	2	3	4	Total
Golden Eagles	0	7	20	7	34
Trojans	17	14	10	14	55

at Veterans Memorial Stadium • Troy, Alabama

- Date: October 6
- Game time: 7:00 p.m. CDT
- Game weather: Clear • Temperature: 72 °F (22 °C) • Wind: NE at 7 miles per hour (11 km/h)
- Game attendance: 21,933
- Referee: Brandon Kirkland
- TV announcers (ESPN2): Clay Matvick (play-by-play) and Rocky Boiman (analyst)

Game information

First quarter

- (10:11) TROY – Jordan Lovett 15-yard run, Ethan Head kick (Drive: 10 plays, 75 yards, 4:49; Troy 7–0)
- (4:37) TROY – Ethan Head 34-yard field goal (Drive: 10 plays, 49 yards, 4:13; Troy 10–0)
- (1:53) TROY – Goose Crowder 9-yard run, Ethan Head kick (Drive: 3 plays, 59 yards, 1:17; Troy 17–0)

Second quarter

- (12:09) USM – Mario Sanders 2-yard pass from Landry Lyddy, Creighton Wilbanks kick (Drive: 12 plays, 75 yards, 4:44; Troy 17–7)
- (6:20) TROY – Goose Crowder 1-yard run, Ethan Head kick (Drive: 12 plays, 78 yards, 5:42; Troy 24–7)
- (0:21) TROY – Nick Hampton 5-yard pass from Goose Crowder, Ethan Head kick (Drive: 10 plays, 75 yards, 4:26; Troy 31–7)

Third quarter

- (14:43) USM – AJ Little 75-yard pass from Mario Sanders (Drive: 2 plays, 75 yards, 0:17; Troy 31–13)
- (12:13) TROY – Jordan Lovett 46-yard pass from Goose Crowder, Ethan Head kick (Drive: 5 plays, 82 yards, 2:23; Troy 38–13)
- (5:25) USM – Mario Sanders 27-yard pass from Landry Lyddy, Creighton Wilbanks kick (Drive: 6 plays, 69 yards, 2:20; Troy 38–20)
- (2:12) TROY – Ethan Head 22-yard field goal (Drive: 6 plays, 76 yards, 3:07; Troy 41–20)
- (1:03) USM – Robert Briggs 44-yard run, Creighton Wilbanks kick (Drive: 5 plays, 75 yards, 1:09; Troy 41–27)

Fourth quarter

- (6:50) TROY – Jaheim Merriweather 1-yard run, Ethan Head kick (Drive: 8 plays, 74 yards, 4:29; Troy 48–27)
- (4:38) USM – Jamarice Wilder 1-yard run, Creighton Wilbanks kick (Drive: 6 plays, 75 yards, 2:12; Troy 48–34)
- (1:51) TROY – Gavin Griffin 12-yard run, Ethan Head kick (Drive: 7 plays, 36 yards, 2:47; Troy 55–34)

Statistics	USM	TROY
First downs	30	33
Plays–yards	66–512	80–662
Rushes–yards	27–121	59–437
Passing yards	391	225
Passing: comp–att–int	25–39–2	18–21–0
Time of possession	20:38	39:22

Team	Category	Player	Statistics
Southern Miss	Passing	Landry Lyddy	24/37, 316 yards, 2 TD, INT
Southern Miss	Rushing	Robert Briggs	2 carries, 44 yards, TD
Southern Miss	Receiving	Kaden Saunders	7 receptions, 138 yards
Troy	Passing	Goose Crowder	18/21, 225 yards, 2 TD
Troy	Rushing	Goose Crowder	17 carries, 145 yards, 2 TD
Troy	Receiving	Jordan Lovett	2 receptions, 53 yards, TD

=== Arkansas State ===
Arkansas State Red Wolves (2–4) at Southern Miss Golden Eagles (1–4) – Game summary

Quarter	1	2	3	4	Total
Red Wolves	0	0	0	0	0
Golden Eagles	0	0	0	0	0

at Renasant Stadium • Hattiesburg, Mississippi

- Date: October 17
- Game time: 6:00 p.m. CDT
- Game attendance: 22,585
- TV: ESPN+

Statistics	ARST	USM
First downs		
Plays–yards		
Rushes–yards		
Passing yards		
Passing: comp–att–int		
Time of possession		

Team	Category	Player	Statistics
Arkansas State	Passing		
Arkansas State	Rushing		
Arkansas State	Receiving		
Southern Miss	Passing		
Southern Miss	Rushing		
Southern Miss	Receiving		

=== Louisiana ===
Louisiana Ragin' Cajuns (5–2) at Southern Miss Golden Eagles (1–5) – Game summary

Quarter	1	2	3	4	Total
Ragin' Cajuns	0	0	0	0	0
Golden Eagles	0	0	0	0	0

at Renasant Stadium • Hattiesburg, Mississippi

- Date: October 24
- Game time: 4:00 p.m. CDT
- Game attendance: 23,244
- TV: ESPN+

Statistics	LA	USM
First downs		
Plays–yards		
Rushes–yards		
Passing yards		
Passing: comp–att–int		
Time of possession		

Team	Category	Player	Statistics
Louisiana	Passing		
Louisiana	Rushing		
Louisiana	Receiving		
Southern Miss	Passing		
Southern Miss	Rushing		
Southern Miss	Receiving		

=== at Louisiana–Monroe ===
Southern Miss Golden Eagles (2–5) at Louisiana–Monroe Warhawks (1–6) – Game summary

Quarter	1	2	3	4	Total
Golden Eagles	0	0	0	0	0
Warhawks	0	0	0	0	0

at FMOL Health/St. Francis Stadium • Monroe, Louisiana

- Date: October 31
- Game time: 2:30 p.m. CDT
- Game attendance: 9,086
- TV: ESPN+

Game information

First quarter
Second quarter
Third quarter
Fourth quarter

Statistics	USM	ULM
First downs		
Plays–yards		
Rushes–yards		
Passing yards		
Passing: comp–att–int		
Turnovers		
Time of possession		

Team	Category	Player	Statistics
Southern Miss	Passing		
Southern Miss	Rushing		
Southern Miss	Receiving		
Louisiana–Monroe	Passing		
Louisiana–Monroe	Rushing		
Louisiana–Monroe	Receiving		

=== James Madison ===
James Madison Dukes (7–2) at Southern Miss Golden Eagles (3–5) – Game summary

Quarter	1	2	3	4	Total
Dukes	0	0	0	0	0
Golden Eagles	0	0	0	0	0

at Renasant Stadium • Hattiesburg, Mississippi

- Date: November 5
- Game time: 7:00 p.m.
- Game attendance: 24,182
- TV: ESPN+

Statistics	JMU	USM
First downs		
Plays–yards		
Rushes–yards		
Passing yards		
Passing: comp–att–int		
Time of possession		

Team	Category	Player	Statistics
James Madison	Passing		
James Madison	Rushing		
James Madison	Receiving		
Southern Miss	Passing		
Southern Miss	Rushing		
Southern Miss	Receiving		

=== at Louisiana Tech (Rivalry in Dixie) ===
Southern Miss Golden Eagles (3–6) at Louisiana Tech Bulldogs (7–2) – Game summary

Quarter	1	2	3	4	Total
Golden Eagles	0	0	0	0	0
Bulldogs	0	0	0	0	0

at Joe Aillet Stadium • Ruston, Louisiana

- Date: November 14
- Game time: 4:00 p.m. CDT
- Game attendance: 15,423
- TV: ESPN+

Statistics	USM	LT
First downs		
Total yards		
Rushing yards		
Passing yards		
Turnovers		
Time of possession		

Team	Category	Player	Statistics
Southern Miss	Passing		
Southern Miss	Rushing		
Southern Miss	Receiving		
Louisiana Tech	Passing		
Louisiana Tech	Rushing		
Louisiana Tech	Receiving		

=== South Alabama ===
South Alabama Jaguars (5–5) at Southern Miss Golden Eagles (3–7) – Game summary

Quarter	1	2	3	4	Total
Jaguars	13	6	0	21	40
Golden Eagles	7	7	15	6	35

at Renasant Stadium • Hattiesburg, Mississippi

- Date: November 21
- Game time: 3:00 p.m. CDT
- Game weather: Sunny
- Referee: Steven Robinson
- TV announcers (ESPN+): Jason Baker (play-by-play) and Larry Boyd (analyst)

Game information

First quarter

- (11:39) USA – Bishop Davenport 3-yard run (Drive: 8 plays, 75 yards, 3:21; South Alabama 6–0)
- (7:17) USA – Anthony Eager 38-yard pass from Bishop Davenport, Dylan Freebury kick (Drive: 7 plays, 70 yards, 3:35; South Alabama 13–0)
- (4:56) USM – Steven Robinson 23-yard run, Creighton Wilbanks kick (Drive: 6 plays, 60 yards, 2:13; South Alabama 13–7)

Second quarter

- (12:19) USA – Dylan Freebury 29-yard field goal (Drive: 14 plays, 64 yards, 7:37; South Alabama 16–7)
- (6:30) USM – Grant Page 46-yard pass from John White, Creighton Wilbanks kick (Drive: 6 plays, 64 yards, 1:49; South Alabama 16–14)
- (0:41) USA – Dylan Freebury 33-yard field goal (Drive: 10 plays, 64 yards, 2:17; South Alabama 19–14)

Third quarter

- (6:34) USM – Jamarice Wilder 1-yard run, Steven Robinson pass (Drive: 5 plays, 25 yards, 1:56; Southern Miss 22–19)
- (0:45) USM – Mario Sanders 50-yard pass from John White, Creighton Wilbanks kick (Drive: 6 plays, 86 yards, 2:45; Southern Miss 29–19)

Fourth quarter

- (13:23) USA – Anthony Eager 13-yard pass from Bishop Davenport, Dylan Freebury kick (Drive: 6 plays, 75 yards, 2:16; Southern Miss 29–26)
- (7:48) USA – PJ Martin 50-yard run, Dylan Freebury kick (Drive: 5 plays, 86 yards, 2:27; South Alabama 33–29)
- (1:57) USA – PJ Martin 6-yard run, Dylan Freebury kick (Drive: 10 plays, 50 yards, 5:08; South Alabama 40–29)
- (0:53) USM – Mario Sanders 45-yard pass from John White (Drive: 5 plays, 82 yards, 0:57; South Alabama 40–35)

Statistics	USA	USM
First downs	28	19
Plays–yards	79–514	60–415
Rushes–yards	51–247	24–121
Passing yards	267	294
Passing: comp–att–int	20–28–0	21–36–1
Time of possession	37:13	22:47

Team	Category	Player	Statistics
South Alabama	Passing	Bishop Davenport	20/28, 267 yards, 2 TD
South Alabama	Rushing	PJ Martin	16 carries, 128 yards, 2 TD
South Alabama	Receiving	Trae Stevenson	6 receptions, 128 yards
Southern Miss	Passing	John White	21/35, 294 yards, 3 TD, INT
Southern Miss	Rushing	Steven Robinson	11 carries, 82 yards, TD
Southern Miss	Receiving	Mario Sanders	7 receptions, 143 yards, 2 TD

=== at Old Dominion (Oyster Bowl) ===
Southern Miss Golden Eagles (0–0) at Old Dominion Monarchs (0–0) – Game summary

Quarter	1	2	3	4	Total
Golden Eagles	0	0	0	0	0
Monarchs	0	0	0	0	0

at S.B. Ballard Stadium • Norfolk, Virginia

- Date: November 28
- Game time: 12:00 p.m. CDT
- TV: ESPN+

Game information

First quarter
Second quarter
Third quarter
Fourth quarter

Statistics	USM	ODU
First downs		
Plays–yards		
Rushes–yards		
Passing yards		
Passing: comp–att–int		
Turnovers		
Time of possession		

Team	Category	Player	Statistics
Southern Miss	Passing		
Southern Miss	Rushing		
Southern Miss	Receiving		
Old Dominion	Passing		
Old Dominion	Rushing		
Old Dominion	Receiving		
