= Joel Gordon (American football) =

American football coach

Current position
- Title: Offensive coordinator & quarterbacks coach
- Team: Auburn
- Conference: SEC

Playing career
- 1999–2002: Shepherd
- Position: Quarterback

Coaching career (HC unless noted)
- 2003–2004: North Carolina Wesleyan (GA)
- 2005–2007: Shepherd (QB/WR)
- 2008–2010: Emory and Henry (OC)
- 2011–2015: Shepherd (QB/WR)
- 2016–2017: Iowa State (OA)
- 2018: Iowa State (QB)
- 2019–2022: Iowa State (PGC/QB)
- 2023–2025: South Florida (OC/QB)
- 2026–present: Auburn (OC/QB)

Joel Gordon is an American football coach who is currently the offensive coordinator and quarterbacks coach for the Auburn Tigers.

== Coaching career ==
=== Early career ===
Gordon got his first coaching job at North Carolina Wesleyan as a graduate assistant and quarterback coach. In 2005, Gordon was hired to coach the quarterbacks and wide receivers for Shepherd. In 2008, Gordon was hired as the offensive coordinator at Emory & Henry. Then in 2011, Gordon was hired back by Shepherd as the quarterbacks and receivers coach.

=== Iowa State ===
In 2016, Gordon was hired by the Iowa State Cyclones as an offensive analyst. In 2018, Gordon was promoted by the Cyclones to serve as the team's quarterbacks coach. In 2019, Gordon was once again promoted by Iowa State this time to serve as the passing game coordinator and quarterbacks coach. In his time as the quarterbacks coach for Iowa State he coached current 49ers and pro bowl quarterback Brock Purdy.

=== South Florida ===
In 2023, Gordon joined the South Florida Bulls as offensive coordinator and quarterbacks coach under head coach Alex Golesh. He directed a high-tempo offense that transformed the program from a 1–11 record in 2022 to bowl eligibility, highlighted by quarterback Byrum Brown's breakout campaign of 3,292 passing yards, 809 rushing yards, and 37 total touchdowns—the first 3,000-yard passer in USF history. Under his guidance, Byrum Brown rebounded from a 2024 injury to post career highs of 3,850 passing yards, 1,025 rushing yards, and 45 total touchdowns. (joining Jayden Daniels as one of only two FBS players to throw for 3000+ and rush for 1000+ yards) In 2025, Gordon's unit ranked third nationally in total offense and fifth in scoring offense, powering USF to a 9–3 record.
