= Luke Kromenhoek =

American football player (born 2005)

No. 17 – South Florida Bulls
- Position: Quarterback
- Class: Redshirt Sophomore

Personal information
- Born: January 14, 2005 (age 21)
- Listed height: 6 ft 4 in (1.93 m)
- Listed weight: 220 lb (100 kg)

Career information
- High school: Benedictine Military School (Savannah, Georgia)
- College: Florida State (2024); Mississippi State (2025); South Florida (2026–present)
- Stats at ESPN

Luke Austin Kromenhoek (born January 14, 2005) is an American college football quarterback for the South Florida Bulls. He previously played for Florida State and Mississippi State.

== Early life ==
Kromenhoek grew up in Savannah, Georgia, and attended Benedictine Military School. He primarily played safety, receiver, and tight end during his first two years at Benedictine Military. He passed for 2,576 yards with 27 touchdowns and three interceptions and rushed for 453 yards and seven touchdowns as a junior. Kromenhoek passed for 2,578 yards and 24 touchdowns during his senior year. Kromenhoek was a consensus four-star recruit and committed to play college football at Florida State during his sophomore year.

== College career ==
=== Florida State ===
Kromenhoek joined the Florida State Seminoles as an early enrollee in January 2024.

On December 10, 2024, Kromenhoek announced that he would enter the NCAA transfer portal.

=== Mississippi State ===
On December 17, 2024, it was announced that Kromenhoek would transfer to Mississippi State.

On December 18, 2025, Kromenhoek announced that he would enter the transfer portal for the second time.

=== USF ===
On January 6, 2026, Kromenhoek committed to the USF Bulls.

=== Statistics ===
Year	Team	Games			Passing								Rushing			
Year	Team	GP	GS	Record	Cmp	Att	Pct	Yds	Y/A	TD	Int	Rtg	Att	Yds	Avg	TD
2024	Florida State	6	2	1–1	44	84	52.4	502	6.0	3	2	109.6	63	113	1.8	0
2025	Mississippi State	3	0	—	5	9	55.6	73	8.1	0	0	123.7	8	25	3.1	1
2026	South Florida	8	2	0–2	48	72	66.7	510	7.1	4	0	144.5	72	287	4.0	5
Career		17	4	1–3	97	165	58.8	1,085	6.6	7	2	125.6	143	1425	3.0	6
