= Kamari Todd =

American football player

No. 33 – Auburn Tigers
- Position: Cornerback
- Class: Sophomore

Personal information
- Listed height: 6 ft 1 in (1.85 m)
- Listed weight: 170 lb (77 kg)

Career information
- High school: Gardendale (Gardendale, Alabama)
- College: Chattanooga (2025); Auburn (2026–present)
- Stats at ESPN

Kamari Todd is an American football cornerback for the Auburn Tigers. He previously played for the Chattanooga Mocs.

== Early life ==
Todd played for Gardendale High School. As a junior, he was named athlete of the week by CBS 42. Todd was a team captain in his senior year, and his stats included 82 tackles, an interception, and two punt blocks. During his time at Gardendale, he was coached by William Eads, the wide receivers coach. Todd received offers from seven NCAA Division I colleges.

== College career ==
=== Chattanooga ===
Todd committed to Chattanooga in February 2025 as an unranked recruit. After playing in the first four games of the season, he made his first start against The Citadel Bulldogs. He made a season-high thirteen tackles against the VMI Keydets. He finished the season with 50 tackles, 1.5 tackles for loss, and one interception.

=== Auburn ===
After entering the transfer portal, Todd committed to Auburn on January 19, 2026. He was the fifth cornerback signed by Auburn during the transfer window. The new position coach DeMarcus Van Dyke said that the goal for Todd would be to continue to develop him in his first season on the team.
