= Rhys Brush =

American football player (born 2007)

No. 19 – Auburn Tigers
- Position: Quarterback
- Class: Freshman

Personal information
- Born: November 6, 2007 (age 19)
- Listed height: 6 ft 2 in (1.88 m)
- Listed weight: 187 lb (85 kg)

Career information
- High school: Armwood (Seffner, Florida)
- College: Auburn (2026–present)

Rhys Brush (born November 6, 2007) is an American football quarterback for the Auburn Tigers.

== Early life ==
Brush played for Armwood High School. He first started for the team as a sophomore in 2023, completing 108 passes for 1,640 yards and 23 touchdowns. As a senior, he passed for 1,685 yards and 24 touchdowns prior to the playoff semifinals in December 2025. Throughout his career, he totaled 6,213 yards, 88 touchdowns, and 9 interceptions.

== College career ==
=== Auburn ===
Brush originally committed to South Florida in February 2025. Following head coach Alex Golesh's decision to take the head coaching job at Auburn University, Brush announced that he would flip his commitment and join the Auburn Tigers. He was the 75th-highest rated quarterback recruit according to 247Sports.
