= Keshaun Singleton =

American football player

No. 11 – Auburn Tigers
- Position: Wide receiver
- Class: Redshirt Junior

Personal information
- Born: Norcross, Georgia, U.S.
- Listed height: 6 ft 3 in (1.91 m)
- Listed weight: 220 lb (100 kg)

Career information
- High school: Meadowcreek (Norcross, Georgia)
- College: South Florida Bulls (2023–2025); Auburn Tigers (2026–present)
- Stats at ESPN

Keshaun Singleton is an American football wide receiver for the Auburn Tigers. He previously played for the South Florida Bulls.

== College career ==
=== South Florida ===
Singleton committed to South Florida in the 2023 season. He made his first start in the 2024 season, against the UAB Blazers. He caught four passes for 105 yards in the game, including his first career touchdown.

Singleton played in every game in 2025, and was the team's leading receiver. He announced that he would enter the transfer portal in December 2025, following the departure of head coach Alex Golesh to join the Auburn Tigers.

=== Auburn Tigers ===
Singleton committed to Auburn in January 2026. He stated that he chose to transfer to Auburn because he trusted Golesh to lead the team. He also expressed interest in reuniting with Byrum Brown, who he played with at South Florida.

== Personal life ==
Singleton was born in Norcross, Georgia.
