= Brady Marchese =

American football player

No. 12 – Auburn Tigers
- Position: Wide receiver
- Class: Freshman

Personal information
- Listed height: 6 ft 1 in (1.85 m)
- Listed weight: 190 lb (86 kg)

Career information
- High school: Cartersville (Cartersville, Georgia)
- College: Auburn (2026–present)

Brady Marchese is an American football wide receiver for the Auburn Tigers.

== Early life ==
Marchese played for Cartersville High School in Cartersville, Georgia. He was rated as the number 42 wide receiver in the country and the number 29 player from Georgia by 247Sports. In his junior season, Marchese totaled 1,051 yards and 11 touchdowns. He then caught 41 passes for 981 yards and 15 touchdowns in his senior season.

== College career ==
Marchese initially committed to the Georgia Bulldogs in March 2025. He flipped his commitment to the Michigan Wolverines in early December. However, after head coach Sherrone Moore was fired later that month, he requested a release from his signing and committed to Auburn.

=== Auburn ===
After signing, Marchese became one of three freshmen receivers on the roster. With a top speed of 22 miles per hour, ESPN writers Craig Haubert and Tom Luginbill wrote that Marchese fit neatly into Auburn's current system, and that he had a clear path to become one of the team's leading playmakers.

== Externals ==
- Auburn Tigers bio
