= Andre Jordan Jr. =

American football player (born 2005)

No. 22 – Auburn Tigers
- Position: Cornerback
- Class: Senior

Personal information
- Born: March 8, 2005 (age 21); Federal Way, Washington, U.S.
- Listed height: 6 ft 2 in (1.88 m)
- Listed weight: 193 lb (88 kg)

Career information
- High school: Federal Way
- College: Oregon State (2023–2024); UCLA (2025); Auburn (2026–present)
- Stats at ESPN

Andre Jordan Jr. (born March 8, 2005) is an American football cornerback for the Auburn Tigers. He previously played for the UCLA Bruins and the Oregon State Beavers.

== College career ==
=== Oregon State Beavers ===
Jordan did not take a redshirt in his freshman year, instead choosing to play throughout the season. He played in the final seven games of the year during that 2023 season. In 2024, he started in nine of the team's games. He totaled 38 tackles in his time at Oregon State.

=== UCLA Bruins ===
Jordan committed to UCLA following the 2024 season. In the preseason, he was expected to start for the team. He started in seven games during 2025, and led the team with ten passes defended. He announced that he would enter the transfer portal in December.

=== Auburn Tigers ===
Jordan signed with Auburn in January 2026. He previously considered transferring to the Arizona State Sun Devils, but decided against it. He spoke positively of the new position coach at Auburn, DeMarcus Van Dyke.
