= Xavier Newsom =

American football player (born 2007)

No. 83 – Auburn Tigers
- Position: Tight end
- Class: Redshirt Freshman

Personal information
- Born: February 15, 2007 (age 19)
- Listed height: 6 ft 6 in (1.98 m)
- Listed weight: 240 lb (109 kg)

Career information
- High school: Martin Luther King Jr. (Detroit, Michigan)
- College: Howard (2025); Auburn (2026–present)
- Stats at ESPN

Xavier Newsom (born February 15, 2007) is an American college football tight end for the Auburn Tigers. He previously played for the Howard Bison.

== Early life ==
Newsom played for Martin Luther King Jr. Senior High School. He was named in The Detroit News 2023 high school football team selection as a defensive lineman. He was listed as one of the top defensive linemen in Michigan by Sports Illustrated. He was rated as a three-star recruit by 247Sports following his senior season.

== College career ==
=== Howard ===
Newsom signed with Howard on December 4, 2024 as a tight end. He played seven games during the season, with one catch. His lone catch came against the Morgan State Bears, for a nine-yard touchdown. He entered the transfer portal on January 5, 2026.

=== Auburn ===
Newsom visited Auburn soon after entering the transfer portal. He committed to the team on January 6, the day after his visit.
