= Locklan Hewlett =

American football player

No. 3 – Auburn Tigers
- Position: Quarterback
- Class: Redshirt Sophomore

Personal information
- Born: St. Augustine, Florida, U.S.
- Listed height: 6 ft 1 in (1.85 m)
- Listed weight: 200 lb (91 kg)

Career information
- High school: St. Augustine (St. Augustine, Florida)
- College: South Florida (2025); Auburn Tigers (2026–present)
- Stats at ESPN

Locklan Hewlett is an American football quarterback who plays for the Auburn Tigers. He previously played for the South Florida Bulls.

== College career ==
Hewlett originally committed to the Wake Forest Demon Deacons in June 2023. He chose to decommit and re-open his recruitment in March 2024.

=== South Florida ===
Hewlett flipped his commitment to South Florida in May 2025. He took his first career snap against the Boise State Broncos. He threw a 45-yard fake punt touchdown pass, which was also his only play of the game. The play was named the play of the day by ESPN. He also played in the 2025 Cure Bowl, where he threw 11 passes for 45 yards.

=== Auburn ===
Hewlett announced that he would be transferring to Auburn University in January 2026. His decision came after Auburn hired former South Florida head coach Alex Golesh.

== Personal life ==
Hewlett's father, Will, is a quarterback trainer.
