= Chas Nimrod =

American football player (born 2003)

No. 5 – Auburn Tigers
- Position: Wide receiver
- Class: Redshirt Senior

Personal information
- Born: July 30, 2003 (age 23)
- Listed height: 6 ft 2 in (1.88 m)
- Listed weight: 198 lb (90 kg)

Career information
- High school: Bentonville (Bentonville, Arkansas)
- College: Tennessee (2022–2024); South Florida (2025); Auburn (2026–present)
- Stats at ESPN

Charles Michael Nimrod (born July 30, 2003) is an American college football wide receiver for the Auburn Tigers. He previously played for the Tennessee Volunteers and South Florida Bulls.

== Early life ==
Nimrod played for Bentonville High School in Bentonville, Arkansas. He was rated as the 6th best player in the class of 2022 players in the state by 247Sports, as well as the 70th highest-rated receiver.

== College career ==
=== Tennessee ===
Nimrod committed to Tennessee on August 5, 2021. He played in two games across the 2022 season and was placed on a redshirt. In 2023, he had a career high of five catches against Georgia. He caught ten passes for 121 yards in 2024. Nimrod entered the transfer portal in December 2024.

=== South Florida ===
Nimrod committed to South Florida on January 4, 2025. He played only six games in 2025 but recorded 23 catches for 466 yards and three touchdowns. He entered the transfer portal in December 2025.

=== Auburn ===
Nimrod committed to Auburn on January 6, 2026, following head coach Alex Golesh from South Florida. After spring practice began, quarterback Byrum Brown praised Nimrod and stated that he expected Nimrod to reach 1,000 receiving yards on the season.
