= Omar Mabson II =

American football player (born 2007)

No. 29 – Auburn Tigers
- Position: Running back
- Class: Sophomore

Personal information
- Born: August 9, 2007 (age 19); Bessemer, Alabama, U.S.
- Listed height: 5 ft 9 in (1.75 m)
- Listed weight: 215 lb (98 kg)

Career information
- High school: Auburn (Auburn, Alabama)
- College: Auburn (2025–present)
- Stats at ESPN

Omar Mabson II (born August 9, 2007) is an American football running back who currently plays for the Auburn Tigers.

== Early life ==
Mabson attended Auburn High School, playing for the Auburn High School Tigers. He was considered a star running back during his time at the school. Despite being a junior, he reclassified to the class of 2025 in December 2024. Keith Etheredge, the high school football coach, stated that Mabson was "ready to play college football." On3.com ranked him as the 66th best running back in the class of 2025.

== College career ==
=== Auburn ===
Mabson committed to Auburn University in January 2025. Head coach Hugh Freeze identified Mabson as a standout running back during the 2025 preseason. He played his first game against the Ball State Cardinals, rushing for 25 yards. He scored his first touchdown against the Missouri Tigers. He finished the season with 16 rushes for 71 yards, as well as four receptions for 42 yards.
