= DeMarcus Van Dyke =

American football player (born 1989)

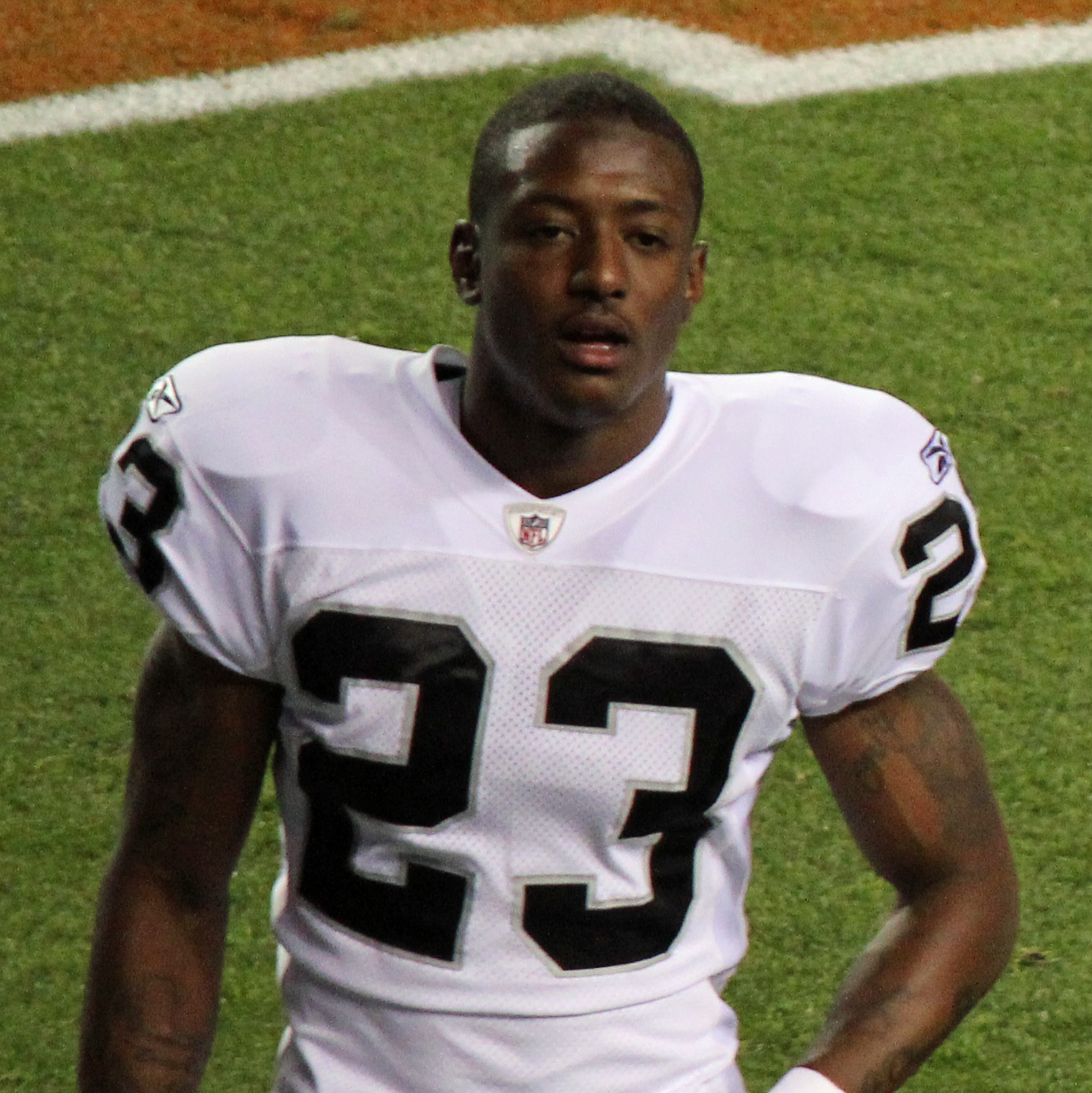
- Van Dyke with the Oakland Raiders in 2011

Auburn Tigers
- Title: Cornerbacks coach

Personal information
- Born: January 17, 1989 (age 37); Miami, Florida, U.S.
- Listed height: 6 ft 1 in (1.85 m)
- Listed weight: 187 lb (85 kg)

Career information
- Position: Cornerback (No. 23, 30)
- High school: Monsignor Edward Pace (Miami Gardens, Florida)
- College: Miami (FL)
- NFL draft: 2011: 3rd round, 81st overall pick

Career history

Playing
- Oakland Raiders (2011); Pittsburgh Steelers (2012–2013); Kansas City Chiefs (2014)*; Minnesota Vikings (2015)*; Atlanta Falcons (2016)*
- * Offseason or practice squad member only

Coaching
- ASA Miami (2017) Cornerbacks coach; Miami (FL) (2018) Defensive quality control analyst; Miami (FL) (2021) Cornerbacks coach; Miami (FL) (2022) Defensive quality control analyst; FIU (2023) Cornerbacks coach; South Florida (2024–2025) Cornerbacks coach; Auburn (2026–present) Cornerbacks coach

Operations
- Miami (FL) (2019–2020) Assistant director of recruiting

Career NFL statistics
- Total tackles: 50
- Fumble recoveries: 1
- Pass deflections: 4
- Interceptions: 1
- Stats at Pro Football Reference

DeMarcus Van Dyke (born January 17, 1989) is an American former professional football player who was a cornerback in the National Football League (NFL) for the Oakland Raiders and Pittsburgh Steelers. Van Dyke is currently the cornerbacks coach for the Auburn Tigers. He was selected by the Raiders in the 3rd round, 81st overall of the 2011 NFL draft. He played college football for the Miami Hurricanes. He was also a member of the Kansas City Chiefs, Minnesota Vikings, and Atlanta Falcons.

== Early life ==
Van Dyke attended Monsignor Edward Pace High School in Miami Gardens, Florida, where he was a two-sport star in both football and track. He played high school football on both sides of the ball for coach Joe Zaccheo. As a defensive back in his junior season, Van Dyke had 12 passes broken up, four interceptions and returned two kickoffs and four punts for touchdowns. He also played as a wide receiver very little his junior year, but still managed to recorded eight receptions for 197 yards. In his senior season in 2006, he recorded 56 tackles and seven interceptions (one returned for a touchdown), while also playing wide receiver on offense a lot more and caught 21 passes for 417 yards. He only had 12 total kick returns since teams often chose to kick away from him.

Also a standout track & field athlete at Monsignor, Van Dyke was one of the state's top sprinters. He posted a career-best time of 21.31 seconds in the 200-meter dash at the 2007 FHSAA 2A Region 4, while also anchoring the 4 × 100 meter relay team to victory with a time of 41.47 seconds. At the 2007 FHSAA 1A Outdoor State Finals, he anchored the 4 × 100 relay team that claimed the state title with a school-record time of 40.78 seconds. He also placed second in the 200-meter race (21.46 s) behind Deonte Thompson.

=== Recruiting ===
Van Dyke was ranked as the No. 16 athlete and the No. 21 player in the state of Florida by Rivals.com. He was rated the No. 15 cornerback and the No. 7 player in the state by Scout.com. He was ranked as the No. 15 player in state by The Orlando Sentinel and the No. 25 player by St. Petersburg Times. He was a member of The Atlanta Journal-Constitution Super Southern 100. He was also rated as the No. 11 player in the state and the No. 12 defensive back in the nation by SuperPrep.

== College career ==
Van Dyke was a dual-sport athlete at the University of Miami (football and track). During his collegiate career at Miami, Van Dyke played in 51 games with 21 starts, totalling 80 tackles (including three for loss), 10 passes defended and three interceptions.

=== Freshman ===
As a freshman in 2007, Van Dyke started eight of 12 games at either left or right cornerback and tallied 14 tackles. He started at right cornerback in his first collegiate game and saw action on 41 plays, making three tackles (two solo) against Marshall. He started at left cornerback and made two solo tackles at Oklahoma. He started at left cornerback and made one solo tackle against Texas A&M. He made three tackles (two solo) in a win at FSU. He started at right cornerback and made two solo tackles. He started at right cornerback against NC State and made two solo tackles. At Virginia Tech, he started at left cornerback and made one solo tackle. At Boston College, he started at left cornerback and made one solo tackle.

=== Sophomore ===
As a sophomore in 2008, Van Dyke changed his jersey number from 30 to 8. He played in all 13 games and made two starts (at NC State and vs. Cal) at right cornerback. He recorded 16 tackles (11 solo, five assisted) and had a pass breakup. He made three tackles at Duke. He also had a pair tackles against Virginia Tech and at NC State. He tallied a career-high five tackles, all solo, against Cal in the Emerald Bowl.

In track & field, Van Dyke ran a season-best time in the 100 metres in the prelims of the ACC Championships with a time of 10.70 seconds. His season-best time in the 200 metres also came in the ACC Championships with a prelim time of 21.54 seconds. He was a member of the 4 × 100 meter relay team that ran a season-best time of 40.67 seconds for a second-place finish at the Georgia Tech Invitational. Also a member of the 4 × 100 relay that placed sixth at the ACC Championships with a time of 40.75 seconds. Indoors, his personal-best time of 6.81 seconds in the 60 metres came at the ACC Championships in the prelims, but placed eighth in the finals with a time of 6.91 seconds.

=== Junior ===
As a junior in 2009, Van Dyke played in 12 games and started eight at the cornerback position. He recorded his first career interception with the 'Canes trailing in the fourth quarter at Wake Forest. He tallied four tackles in back-to-back weeks versus Clemson and at Wake Forest. He set a career-high in total tackles (6) and solo stops (5) against Wisconsin in the Champs Sports Bowl. He also had three pass break-ups on the year. He recorded a tackle for a loss in back-to-back games at UCF and versus Clemson.

In track & field, Van Dyke ran a 6.47 in his only attempt in the 55-meter hurdles at the Tom Jones Invitational.

=== Senior ===
As a senior in 2010, Van Dyke played in 13 games, starting three. He spent time at left cornerback and in the nickel package. He had a season-high four solo stops at Clemson. He had two tackles at Ohio State. He tallied a single solo tackle against FAMU, FSU, North Carolina and at Georgia Tech. He posted 10 assisted stops on the season, including three at Duke. He had one tackle for a loss of two yards against North Carolina. He forced and recovered a fumble at Clemson. He picked off two passes on the season, including one at Pittsburgh that he returned for 74 yards. He also recorded five pass break-ups.

In track & field, Van Dyke's season-best effort in the 100-meter dash came in the prelims of the ACC Championships with a career-best time of 10.61 seconds. He ran the second leg of the 4 × 100 meter relay team that advanced to the NCAA semifinals, ran a season-best time of 39.57 seconds at the NCAA quarterfinals (setting a school record) and placed fifth at the Penn Relays with a time of 40.35 seconds. Indoors, his season-best effort in the 60-meter dash came in the prelims of the National Open at 6.84 seconds, in the final he finished fourth in 6.87 seconds. He ran the anchor leg of the 4 × 400 meter relay team that finished with a time of 3:15.49 at the Tyson Invitational.

== Professional career ==
Pre-draft measurables
Height	Weight	Arm length	Hand span	Wingspan	40-yard dash	10-yard split	20-yard split	20-yard shuttle	Three-cone drill	Vertical jump	Broad jump	Bench press
6 ft 0 3/4 in (1.85 m)	176 lb (80 kg)	31 3/8 in (0.80 m)	9 in (0.23 m)	6 ft 2 1/8 in (1.88 m)	4.37 s	1.58 s	2.58 s	4.09 s	6.97 s	33.5 in (0.85 m)	10 ft 1 in (3.07 m)	5 reps
All values from NFL Combine

=== Oakland Raiders ===
Van Dyke was selected by the Oakland Raiders in the 3rd round 81st overall of the 2011 NFL draft. As a rookie, he was used sparingly, contributing 15 tackles and one interception.

=== Pittsburgh Steelers ===
Van Dyke was signed by the Pittsburgh Steelers on September 7, 2012.

=== Kansas City Chiefs ===
On January 12, 2014, the Kansas City Chiefs signed Van Dyke.

=== Minnesota Vikings ===
On January 8, 2015, the Minnesota Vikings signed Van Dyke.

=== Atlanta Falcons ===
On March 15, 2016, the Atlanta Falcons signed Van Dyke. On September 3, 2016, he was placed on injured reserve with a concussion. On September 10, he was released from injured reserve.

== Coaching career ==
DeMarcus is currently the cornerbacks coach for Auburn University, a role he was hired for in 2026. In the 2024 and 2025 seasons, Van Dyke was the cornerbacks coach for the University of South Florida. Previously, he served Florida International University as the cornerbacks coach (2023), the University of Miami as a defensive quality control analyst (2018, 2022), cornerbacks coach (2021), and assistant director of recruiting (2019-2020). In 2017 he was the cornerbacks coach as ASA College in Miami.

== Personal life ==
Van Dyke's cousin, David is a cornerback that played collegiately for Tennessee State. They were teammates on the Kansas City Chiefs during the 2014 offseason.

DeMarcus is a Miami Gardens, FL native and is married to Kiawana Van Dyke, they live in Miramar, FL. The couple has a son, DeMarcus Jr. and a daughter, Kai.
