= Alex Golesh =

American football coach (born 1984)

Current position
- Title: Head coach
- Team: Auburn
- Conference: SEC
- Record: 7–4
- Annual salary: $7.38 million

Biographical details
- Born: June 24, 1984 (age 42); Moscow, Russian SFSR, Soviet Union
- Education: Ohio State

Coaching career (HC unless noted)
- 2003: Westerville Central HS (OH) (DL)
- 2004–2005: Ohio State (SA)
- 2006–2007: Northern Illinois (GA)
- 2008: Oklahoma State (GA)
- 2009: Toledo (RB/RC)
- 2010–2011: Toledo (TE/RC)
- 2012–2013: Illinois (TE/RC)
- 2014: Illinois (TE/HB/RC)
- 2015: Illinois (TE/ST)
- 2016–2019: Iowa State (TE/RC)
- 2020: UCF (co-OC/TE)
- 2021–2022: Tennessee (OC/TE)
- 2023–2025: South Florida
- 2026–present: Auburn

Head coaching record
- Overall: 30–19
- Bowls: 2–0

Aleksey Golesh (/ˈɡoʊlɪʃ/) (Russian: Алексей Голеш, IPA: [ɐlʲɪkˈsʲej ˈgolʲɨʂ]) (born June 24, 1984) is a Russian-American college football coach who is currently the head football coach at Auburn University. He previously served as the head football coach at the University of South Florida. Prior to that role he was the offensive coordinator and tight ends coach at the University of Tennessee.

== Personal life ==
Born in Moscow, Golesh moved to the United States when he was seven amidst the dissolution of the Soviet Union, growing up in Brooklyn, New York, and Dublin, Ohio. He was a three-year letter winner on the football team at Dublin Scioto High School. Golesh and his wife, Alexis, have a daughter and a son, Corbin and Barrett.

== Coaching career ==
Golesh began his coaching career as an assistant coach working with the defensive line at Westerville Central High School in Ohio, whose football program was in its first year. He was later hired as a student assistant at Ohio State in 2004 where he earned his degree in 2006. He also spent time coaching at Northern Illinois and Oklahoma State as a graduate assistant.

=== Toledo ===
Golesh was hired as the running backs coach and recruiting coordinator at Toledo in 2009 working under Tim Beckman, who he also worked under at Oklahoma State as a defensive graduate assistant. He was later shifted to the tight ends coach in 2010. Golesh aided the Toledo program in securing the No. 1 recruiting class in the Mid-American Conference in consecutive years.

=== Illinois ===
Golesh followed Beckman to Illinois in 2012, working once again as the tight ends coach and recruiting coordinator. He also added running backs coach duties in 2014 and was later promoted to special teams coordinator in 2015.

=== Iowa State ===
Golesh was hired as the tight ends coach and recruiting coordinator at Iowa State in 2016 under Matt Campbell, who he worked with at Toledo. In the season before Golesh came to Ames, Iowa State tight ends caught a combined five passes. In 2019, Cyclone tight ends caught 75 passes under his direction and played a pivotal role in the team's success. Golesh mentored all-conference performers at tight end in 2017, 2018 and 2019, as the Cyclones recorded a pair of 8–5 seasons and back-to-back bowl berths in 2017 and 2018. In 2018, Iowa State broke its school record for conference victories in a season (six), tying for third in the Big 12 for the best conference finish 40 years. In 2019, the Cyclones ended 7–6 after an appearance in the Camping World Bowl in Orlando, for their third consecutive bowl invitation.

Sophomore tight end starter Charlie Kolar caught 51 passes for 697 yards (most yards all-time by a Cyclone tight end in a season) and seven touchdowns, helping him earn second-team All-America honors from Pro Football Focus and first-team All-Big 12 recognition, as well as first-team Academic All-America notice. He also was a semifinalist for the Mackey Award as one of the nation's top tight ends. Teammate Chase Allen earned second-team All-Big 12 honors as Golesh's unit completed the rare feat of sweeping both All-Big 12 tight end awards. The tight end production helped Iowa State rank 11th nationally and second in the Big 12 in passing offense at 311.3 yards per game. Both Charlie Kolar and Chase Allen participated in the 2022 NFL Combine.

=== UCF ===
Golesh was hired as a co-offensive coordinator and tight ends coach at UCF in 2020, working under Josh Heupel and alongside co-offensive coordinator Anthony Tucker. Despite the challenges presented by the unique COVID-19 shortened season, the Knights shined offensively in Golesh's first year, ranking second in the FBS in total offense (568.1), fourth in passing offense (357.4), seventh in total passing yards (3,574) and eighth nationally in scoring offense (42.2). Under his guidance, Dillon Gabriel finished the season throwing for over 3,500 yards, 32 touchdowns, and only 4 interceptions. Jacob Harris broke out as a hybrid "flex" receiver-tight end under Golesh, with 30 receptions for 539 yards and 8 touchdowns (third-most in the AAC), earning conference honors and was a fourth-round selection by the Los Angeles Rams in the 2021 NFL draft.

=== Tennessee ===
Golesh followed Heupel to Tennessee as offensive coordinator and tight ends coach in 2021. During the 2021 season, Golesh helped Tennessee shatter eight team single-season records, including points (511), total offensive yards (6,174), touchdowns (67), point after touchdowns made (67), total first downs (316), rushing first downs (164), fewest interceptions thrown (3) and passing efficiency (167.10). Tennessee improved their scoring offense by 101 spots, going from 108th in the country in 2020 to seventh in 2021. In 2022, Golesh once again led the Volunteers to their best offense in school history, finishing as the top ranked offense in the nation with 46.1 points per game.

=== South Florida ===
On December 4, 2022, Golesh was hired as USF's sixth head coach, inheriting a program that had gone 4–29 over the previous three seasons. In his first year, Golesh led the Bulls to a 7–6 record, including a 45–0 shutout victory over Syracuse in the Boca Raton Bowl—marking the program's first bowl win since 2017.

The following season, USF again finished 7–6, highlighted by a thrilling 41–39 five-overtime win over San Jose State in the Hawaiʻi Bowl. Golesh became the first coach in program history to secure bowl eligibility and victories in his first two seasons. Wide receiver Sean Atkins, a former walk-on who emerged as a key target, became the first USF receiver to surpass 1,000 receiving yards in program history and finished his career as the Bulls' all-time leader in receiving yards and receptions.

Golesh's third season was a breakout, culminating in a 9–3 record—the Bulls' first 9-win campaign since 2017 and their best overall mark in eight years. The team ranked third nationally in total offense and fifth in scoring, returning to the AP Top 25 (peaking at No. 18) for the first time in seven years. Key early victories included a dominant 34–7 upset over No. 25 Boise State in Week 1 and an 18–15 road win against No. 13 Florida in Week 2, both signature triumphs that propelled USF to a 6–1 start. The season ended with a 52–3 rout of Rice on November 30, securing bowl eligibility for the third straight year under Golesh.

Central to the 2025 success was quarterback Byrum Brown, who thrived in Golesh's up-tempo veer/shoot offense. Building on his 2023 breakout—where Brown led the AAC in total offense (3,823 yards), he became the first USF quarterback to throw for 3,000 yards and rush for 1000 in a season, and finished first in the AAC and 7th in FBS in total yards per game (318.6). Brown surpassed USF's single-season passing yards record previously set by Quinton Flowers and Matt Grothe while becoming the program's first 3,000-yard passer. Over three seasons at USF, Golesh compiled a 23–15 record, a 19 win improvement over the previous head coach.

=== Auburn ===
After being linked to the Arkansas head coach opening for numerous weeks, Golesh finalized a six-year deal to become the head coach of the Auburn Tigers on November 30, 2025.

== Head coaching record ==
Year	Team	Overall	Conference	Standing	Bowl/playoffs
South Florida Bulls (American Athletic Conference / American Conference) (2023–2025)
2023	South Florida	7–6	4–4	T–5th	W Boca Raton
2024	South Florida	7–6	4–4	T–6th	W Hawaii
2025	South Florida	9–3	6–2	T–4th	Cure*
South Florida:		23–15	14–10	*Left for Auburn prior to bowl game	
Auburn Tigers (Southeastern Conference) (2026–present)
2026	Auburn	7–4	4–4		
Auburn:		7–4	4–4		
Total:		30–19			
