= Byrum Brown =

American football player (born 2004)

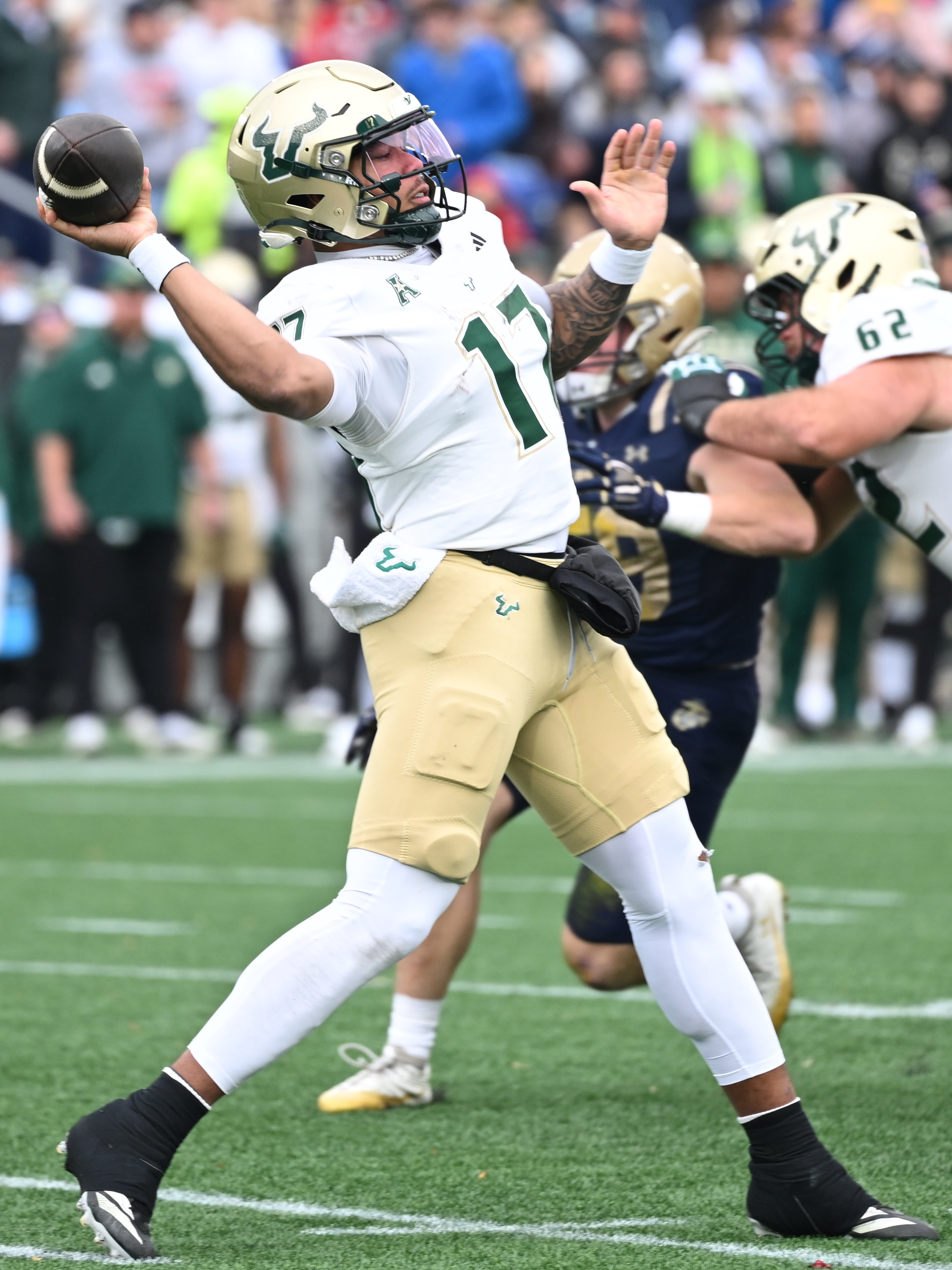
- Brown in 2025

No. 17 – Auburn Tigers
- Position: Quarterback
- Class: Senior

Personal information
- Born: September 29, 2004 (age 22)
- Listed height: 6 ft 3 in (1.91 m)
- Listed weight: 232 lb (105 kg)

Career information
- High school: Rolesville (Rolesville, North Carolina)
- College: South Florida (2022–2025); Auburn (2026–present)

Awards and highlights
- Second-team All-AAC (2025)
- Stats at ESPN

Byrum Brown (born September 29, 2004) is an American college football quarterback for the Auburn Tigers. He previously played for the South Florida Bulls.

== Early life & education ==
Brown attended Rolesville High School in Rolesville, North Carolina, where he completed 464 of 758 passes for 8,122 yards and 87 touchdowns to 21 interceptions, and rushed for 2,074 yards and 26 touchdowns. He committed to play college football at the University of South Florida. He graduated from USF magna cum laude in fall 2025 with a degree in Health Sciences with a 3.77 GPA.

== College career ==
=== South Florida Bulls ===
==== 2022 season ====
Brown made his first start in 2022 against Tulsa, where he completed 21 of 25 passes for 240 yards and three touchdowns and rushed for 76 yards and a touchdown in a 48–42 loss to Tulsa. He finished the 2022 season, completing 36 of 50 passes for 404 yards and five touchdowns to one interception, while also rushing for 179 yards and three touchdowns.

==== 2023 season ====
Heading into the 2023 season, Brown was named South Florida's starting quarterback. In week 2 of the 2023 season, he completed 20 of 34 passing attempts for 197 yards and three touchdowns, while also rushing for two touchdowns, as he helped South Florida snap an 11 game losing streak beating Florida A&M. In week 4, Brown completed 22 of 29 pass attempts for 435 yards and two touchdowns and rushed for 82 yards in a win over Rice. He was named the AAC Offensive Player of the Week, Davey O'Brien Award "Great 8" Quarterbacks of the week, and the Manning Award "Stars of the Week". In week 5, Brown helped the Bulls snap a 19-game road losing streak by defeating Navy 44-30. In that game, he completed 26 of 34 pass attempts for 338 yards and three touchdowns. In a week 9 loss to the Memphis Tigers, Brown completed 31 of 39 pass attempts for 357 yards, five touchdowns and one interception, while rushing for 100 yards on 23 attempts. In the final game of the regular season, he had 296 total yards of offense and five touchdowns in a 48-14 rout of Charlotte, earning AAC Offensive Player of the Week for a 2nd time, and clinching a Bulls bowl game for the first time since 2018.

Brown surpassed USF's single-season passing yards record previously set by Quinton Flowers and Matt Grothe while becoming the program's first 3,000 yard passer. He finished first in the AAC and 7th in FBS in total yards (3,823) and total yards per game (318.6), and was first in the AAC and 12th in FBS in points responsible for (17.3 ppg).

Brown led the Bulls to a 45-0 victory over Syracuse in the Boca Raton Bowl. He completed 19 of 26 pass attempts for 214 yards and three touchdowns and rushed for 64 yards on 14 attempts, earning Offensive MVP honors.

==== 2024 season ====
Brown entered his junior season on several national award watch lists, including the Maxwell Award, Walter Camp Player of the Year Award, Davey O’Brien National Quarterback Award, Johnny Unitas Golden Arm Award, and Manning Award. He started the first five games but suffered a lower leg injury against Tulane on September 28, missing the next seven games. He appeared briefly for two snaps in the Hawai'i Bowl on December 24. In six games (five starts), Brown completed 78 of 132 passes (59.1%) for 836 yards, two touchdowns, and no interceptions. He rushed 68 times for 269 yards and three touchdowns.

==== 2025 season ====
As a senior, Brown started all 12 regular-season games for the Bulls, who finished 9–3. He completed 226 of 341 passes (66.3%) for 3,158 yards, 28 touchdowns, and seven interceptions. Brown rushed 175 times for 1,008 yards and 14 touchdowns, becoming the 12th FBS player to pass for 3,000 yards and rush for 1,000 in a season. He accounted for 42 total touchdowns and earned second-team All-AAC honors. Brown earned Second-team All-AAC honors. He was named a 2025 Military Bowl STEM Scholar-Athlete and a Davey O’Brien Award semifinalist, and appeared on watch lists for the Maxwell, Walter Camp, Davey O’Brien, Manning, and Comeback Player of the Year awards. Other accolades included the 2025 Shrine Bowl 1,000, four Davey O’Brien "Great 8" selections (Weeks 1, 2, 7, 11), two Manning Stars of the Week awards (Weeks 7, 11), one American Conference Offensive Player of the Week (Week 2), and six American Conference Weekly Honorable Mentions (Weeks 1, 6, 7, 8, 9, 11).

Brown opted out of the Cure Bowl against Old Dominion on December 17 giving backup quarterback Gaston Moore the starting position, but served as an assistant coach on the sideline.

On December 22, 2025, Brown announced his intention to enter the NCAA transfer portal.

=== Auburn Tigers ===
==== 2026 season ====
On January 6, 2026, Brown announced his commitment to the Auburn Tigers, following South Florida coach Alex Golesh.

=== Statistics ===
Year	Team	Games			Passing								Rushing				Receiving			
Year	Team	GP	GS	Record	Cmp	Att	Pct	Yds	Y/A	TD	Int	Rtg	Att	Yds	Avg	TD	Rec	Yds	Avg	TD
2022	South Florida	4	2	0–2	36	50	72.0	404	8.1	5	1	168.9	31	179	5.8	3	0	0	0.0	0
2023	South Florida	13	13	7–6	276	427	64.6	3,292	7.7	26	11	144.3	203	809	4.0	11	2	36	18.0	0
2024	South Florida	6	5	2−3	78	132	59.1	836	6.3	2	0	117.3	68	269	4.0	3	1	12	12.0	1
2025	South Florida	12	12	9−3	226	341	66.3	3,158	9.3	28	7	167.1	175	1,008	5.8	14	0	0	0.0	0
2026	Auburn	11	11	7−4	202	308	65.6	2,035	6.6	15	8	132.0	177	644	3.6	9	1	5	5.0	1
Career		46	43	25–18	818	1,258	65.0	9,725	7.7	76	27	145.6	654	2,909	4.4	40	4	53	13.3	2
