= 2026 Old Dominion Monarchs football team =

American college football season

2026 Old Dominion Monarchs football
- Conference: Sun Belt Conference
- East Division
- Record: 3–8 (2–5 Sun Belt)
- Head coach: Ricky Rahne (7th season)
- Offensive coordinator: Kody Cook (1st season)
- Offensive scheme: Veer and shoot
- Defensive coordinator: Blake Seiler (7th season)
- Base defense: 3–2–6
- Home stadium: S.B. Ballard Stadium

2026 Sun Belt Conference football standings
| | Conf. | | | Overall |
| Team | W | | L | W | | L |
|---|---|---|---|---|---|---|
East Division
| Georgia Southern | 6 | – | 1 | 7 | – | 4 |
| James Madison | 5 | – | 2 | 8 | – | 3 |
| Appalachian State | 4 | – | 3 | 7 | – | 4 |
| Coastal Carolina | 3 | – | 4 | 4 | – | 7 |
| Marshall | 3 | – | 4 | 6 | – | 5 |
| Georgia State | 2 | – | 5 | 5 | – | 6 |
| Old Dominion | 2 | – | 5 | 3 | – | 8 |
West Division
| Louisiana Tech xy | 7 | – | 0 | 9 | – | 2 |
| Louisiana | 5 | – | 2 | 8 | – | 3 |
| South Alabama | 4 | – | 3 | 6 | – | 5 |
| Arkansas State | 2 | – | 5 | 4 | – | 7 |
| Troy | 2 | – | 5 | 4 | – | 7 |
| Southern Miss | 2 | – | 5 | 3 | – | 8 |
| Louisiana–Monroe | 2 | – | 5 | 2 | – | 9 |
Championship: TBD vs. Louisiana Tech
$ – Conference champion; x – Division champion/co-champions; y – Championship game participant; As of November 22, 2026; Rankings from AP poll

The 2026 Old Dominion Monarchs football team will represent Old Dominion University in the Sun Belt Conference's East Division during the 2026 NCAA Division I FBS football season. The Monarchs will be led by Ricky Rahne in his seventh year as the head coach. The Monarchs play their home games at S.B. Ballard Stadium, located in Norfolk, Virginia.

== Schedule ==
The football schedule was announced on March 26, 2026.

| Date | Time | Opponent | Site | TV | Result | Attendance |
|---|---|---|---|---|---|---|
| September 5 | 6:00 p.m. | Norfolk State* | S.B. Ballard Stadium; Norfolk, VA (rivalry) | ESPN+ | W 31–10 | 21,944 |
| September 12 | 12:00 p.m. | at Virginia Tech* | Lane Stadium; Blacksburg, VA | The CW | L 21–44 | 65,632 |
| September 19 | 6:00 p.m. | East Carolina* | S.B. Ballard Stadium; Norfolk, VA | ESPN+ | L 17–20 | 21,444 |
| September 26 | 6:00 p.m. | James Madison | S.B. Ballard Stadium; Norfolk, VA (Royal Rivalry) | ESPN+ | L 20–46 | 20,035 |
| October 3 | 3:30 p.m. | at Georgia State | Center Parc Stadium; Atlanta, GA | ESPN+ | L 10–42 | 17,854 |
| October 10 | 1:00 p.m. | at Appalachian State | Kidd Brewer Stadium; Boone, NC | ESPN+ | W 10–3 | 27,011 |
| October 15 | 7:30 p.m. | Georgia Southern | S.B. Ballard Stadium; Norfolk, VA | ESPN2 | L 15–23 | 17,912 |
| October 24 | 5:00 p.m. | at Louisiana Tech | Joe Aillet Stadium; Ruston, LA | ESPN+ | L 0–26 | 20,444 |
| October 31 | 1:00 p.m. | Marshall^{†} | S.B. Ballard Stadium; Norfolk, VA | ESPN+ | L 23–36 | 17,093 |
| November 7 | 1:00 p.m. | at Coastal Carolina | Brooks Stadium; Conway, SC | ESPN+ | W 21–8 | 16,092 |
| November 21 | 3:30 p.m. | at UConn* | Pratt & Whitney Stadium at Rentschler Field; East Hartford, CT | CBSSN | L 21–29 | 27,006 |
| November 28 | 1:00 p.m. | Southern Miss | S.B. Ballard Stadium; Norfolk, VA (Oyster Bowl) | ESPN+ | | |
*Non-conference game; ^{†}Homecoming; All times are in Eastern time

== Preseason ==
=== Media poll ===
In the Sun Belt preseason coaches' poll, the Monarchs were picked to finish second place in the East division.

Running back Devin Roche was awarded to be in the preseason All-Sun Belt first team offense. Defensive lineman Chris Forbes and defensive backs Mario Easterly and Zion Frink were named to the second team.

== Game summaries ==
=== Norfolk State ===
During this game, the ODU players wore special jerseys to honor LTC Brandon Shah, who was killed in a shooting at Old Dominion University earlier in the year.

Norfolk State Spartans (1–0) at Old Dominion Monarchs (0–0) – Game summary

| Quarter | 1 | 2 | 3 | 4 | Total |
|---|---|---|---|---|---|
| Spartans | 0 | 7 | 3 | 0 | 10 |
| Monarchs | 7 | 10 | 14 | 0 | 31 |

at S.B. Ballard Stadium • Norfolk, VA

- Date: September 5
- Game time: 6:00 p.m.
- Game weather: Sunny • Temperature: 83 °F (28 °C)
- Game attendance: 21,944
- Referee: Rory Bernard
- TV announcers (ESPN+): Scott Jackson (play-by-play) and Andy Mashaw (analyst)

Game information

First quarter

- ODU – Quinn Henicle 13-yard run (Nathanial Eichner kick), 4:37. Monarchs 7–0. Drive: 6 plays, 80 yards, 2:48.

Second quarter

- ODU – TJ Johnson 11-yard pass from Quinn Henicle (Nathanial Eichner kick), 13:46. Monarchs 14–0. Drive: 8 plays, 45 yards, 4:02.
- ODU – Nathanial Eichner 37-yard field goal, 3:15. Monarchs 17–0. Drive: 7 plays, 36 yards, 3:00.
- NORF – Deljay Bailey 3-yard run (Marco Peery kick), 0:25. Monarchs 17–7. Drive: 3 plays, 22 yards, 0:52.

Third quarter

- NORF – Marco Peery 37-yard field goal, 9:03. Monarchs 17–10. Drive: 8 plays, 43 yards, 3:51.
- ODU – TJ Johnson 14-yard pass from Quinn Henicle (Nathanial Eichner kick), 4:18. Monarchs 24–10. Drive: 10 plays, 76 yards, 4:40.
- ODU – Quinn Henicle 2-yard run (Nathanial Eichner kick), 0:42. Monarchs 31–10. Drive: 2 plays, 12 yards, 0:53.

Fourth quarter

- No scoring plays.

| Statistics | NORF | ODU |
|---|---|---|
| First downs | 12 | 16 |
| Plays–yards | 60–220 | 55–319 |
| Rushes–yards | 40–126 | 42–182 |
| Passing yards | 94 | 137 |
| Passing: Comp–Att–Int | 14–20–1 | 9–13–1 |
| Turnovers | 3 | 2 |
| Time of possession | 32:19 | 27:41 |

| Team | Category | Player | Statistics |
|---|---|---|---|
| Norfolk State | Passing | Deljay Bailey | 14/20, 94 yards, INT |
| Norfolk State | Rushing | Jalyn Daniels | 11 carries, 84 yards |
| Norfolk State | Receiving | Paul Billups II | 7 receptions, 49 yards |
| Old Dominion | Passing | Quinn Henicle | 9/12, 137 yards, 2 TD, INT |
| Old Dominion | Rushing | Quinn Henicle | 13 carries, 68 yards, 2 TD |
| Old Dominion | Receiving | Leon Haughton Jr. | 2 receptions, 46 yards |

=== at Virginia Tech ===
Old Dominion Monarchs (1–0) at Virginia Tech Hokies (1–0) – Game summary

| Quarter | 1 | 2 | 3 | 4 | Total |
|---|---|---|---|---|---|
| Monarchs | 3 | 3 | 7 | 8 | 21 |
| Hokies | 17 | 17 | 3 | 7 | 44 |

at Lane Stadium • Blacksburg, Virginia

- Date: September 12
- Game time: 12:00 p.m.
- Game weather: Cloudy • Temperature: 74 °F (23 °C) • Wind: N 0 mph
- Game attendance: 65,632
- Referee: Nolan Dumas
- TV announcers (The CW): Thom Brennaman (play-by-play), Jason Cabinda (analyst) and Wes Bryant (sideline reporter)

Game information

First quarter

- VT – John Love 39-yard field goal, 10:23. Hokies 3–0. Drive: 11 plays, 54 yards, 4:37.
- VT – Marcellous Hawkins Jr. 20-yard run (John Love kick), 3:01. Hokies 10–0. Drive: 14 plays, 77 yards, 5:42.
- VT – Tyson Flowers 14-yard fumble return (John Love kick), 2:29. Hokies 17–0. Drive: 1 play, -6 yards, 0:05.
- ODU – Nathanial Eichner 34-yard field goal, 0:04. Hokies 17–3. Drive: 7 plays, 59 yards, 2:25.

Second quarter

- VT – Luke Reynolds 10-yard pass from Ethan Grunkemeyer (John Love kick), 8:23. Hokies 24–3. Drive: 14 plays, 75 yards, 6:41.
- VT – Luke Reynolds 16-yard pass from Ethan Grunkemeyer (John Love kick), 6:51. Hokies 31–3. Drive: 3 plays, 20 yards, 1:24.
- VT – John Love 22-yard field goal, 3:10. Hokies 34–3. Drive: 4 plays, -3 yards, 1:25.
- ODU – Nathanial Eichner 51-yard field goal, 0:00. Hokies 34–6. Drive: 1 play, 0 yards, 0:09.

Third quarter

- VT – John Love 25-yard field goal, 6:33. Hokies 37–6. Drive: 12 plays, 73 yards, 5:38.
- ODU – Leon Haughton Jr. 7-yard pass from Quinn Henicle (Nathanial Eichner kick), 1:14. Hokies 37–13. Drive: 11 plays, 75 yards, 5:19.

Fourth quarter

- VT – Ethan Grunkemeyer 1-yard run (John Love kick), 11:03. Hokies 44–13. Drive: 12 plays, 84 yards, 5:07.
- ODU – Quinn Henicle 76-yard run (Quinn Henicle two-point conversion run), 7:49. Hokies 44–21. Drive: 2 plays, 85 yards, 1:05.

| Statistics | ODU | VT |
|---|---|---|
| First downs | 11 | 26 |
| Plays–yards | 52–310 | 86–416 |
| Rushes–yards | 31–123 | 42–89 |
| Passing yards | 187 | 327 |
| Passing: comp–att–int | 13–21–0 | 32–44–0 |
| Turnovers | 3 | 2 |
| Time of possession | 21:30 | 38:30 |

| Team | Category | Player | Statistics |
|---|---|---|---|
| Old Dominion | Passing | Quinn Henicle | 13/21, 187 yards, TD |
| Old Dominion | Rushing | Quinn Henicle | 16 carries, 83 yards, TD |
| Old Dominion | Receiving | Josh Rodriguez | 3 receptions, 89 yards |
| Virginia Tech | Passing | Ethan Grunkemeyer | 31/42, 327 yards, 2 TD |
| Virginia Tech | Rushing | Jeffrey Overton Jr. | 14 carries, 47 yards |
| Virginia Tech | Receiving | Luke Reynolds | 8 receptions, 108 yards, 2 TD |

=== East Carolina ===
East Carolina Pirates (0–2) at Old Dominion Monarchs (1–1) – Game summary

| Quarter | 1 | 2 | 3 | 4 | Total |
|---|---|---|---|---|---|
| Pirates | 7 | 3 | 7 | 3 | 20 |
| Monarchs | 0 | 17 | 0 | 0 | 17 |

at S.B. Ballard Stadium • Norfolk, Virginia

- Date: September 19
- Game time: 6:00 p.m.
- Game weather: Sunny • Temperature: 80 °F (27 °C) • Wind: NE 9 mph
- Game attendance: 21,444
- Referee: Charles Lamertina
- TV announcers (ESPN+): Scott Jackson (play-by-play) and Andy Mashaw (analyst)

Game information

First quarter

- ECU – Ja'Keith Hamilton 25-yard pass from Jason Dickerson (Noah Perez kick), 6:03. Pirates 7–0. Drive: 2 plays, 28 yards, 0:41.

Second quarter

- ODU – Nathanial Eichner 38-yard field goal, 9:17. Pirates 7–3. Drive: 6 plays, 60 yards, 3:12.
- ODU – Daevon Iles 23-yard fumble returned (Nathanial Eichner kick), 8:12. Monarchs 10–7. Drive: 3 plays, -2 yards, 1:05.
- ODU – Quinn Henicle 18-yard run (Nathanial Eichner kick), 4:14. Monarchs 17–7. Drive: 5 plays, 35 yards, 1:48.
- ECU – Noah Perez 36-yard field goal, 0:02. Monarchs 17–10. Drive: 7 plays, 56 yards, 1:03.

Third quarter

- ECU – Ayden Duncanson 67-yard interception return (Noah Perez kick), 12:36. Tied 17–17. Drive: 5 plays, 37 yards, 2:20.

Fourth quarter

- ECU – Noah Perez 24-yard field goal, 9:39. Pirates 20–17. Drive: 12 plays, 77 yards, 7:07.

| Statistics | ECU | ODU |
|---|---|---|
| First downs | 17 | 15 |
| Plays–yards | 68–276 | 64–274 |
| Rushes–yards | 47–173 | 44–180 |
| Passing yards | 103 | 94 |
| Passing: comp–att–int | 11–21–0 | 8–20–1 |
| Turnovers | 1 | 2 |
| Time of possession | 30:37 | 29:23 |

| Team | Category | Player | Statistics |
|---|---|---|---|
| East Carolina | Passing | Mitch Griffis | 4/12, 58 yards |
| East Carolina | Rushing | TJ Engleman Jr. | 16 carries, 99 yards |
| East Carolina | Receiving | Dillon Lorick | 1 reception, 27 yards |
| Old Dominion | Passing | Quinn Henicle | 8/20, 94 yards, INT |
| Old Dominion | Rushing | Devin Roche | 18 carries, 102 yards |
| Old Dominion | Receiving | Zialis Blackmon | 1 reception, 42 yards |

=== James Madison ===
James Madison Dukes (3–0) at Old Dominion Monarchs (1–2) – Game summary

| Quarter | 1 | 2 | 3 | 4 | Total |
|---|---|---|---|---|---|
| Dukes | 17 | 13 | 6 | 10 | 46 |
| Monarchs | 7 | 10 | 0 | 3 | 20 |

at S.B. Ballard Stadium • Norfolk, Virginia

- Date: September 26
- Game time: 6:00 p.m.
- Game attendance: 20,035
- TV: ESPN+

| Statistics | JMU | ODU |
|---|---|---|
| First downs | 20 | 14 |
| Plays–yards | 79–405 | 68–247 |
| Rushes–yards | 37–162 | 28–(-14) |
| Passing yards | 243 | 261 |
| Passing: comp–att–int | 24–42–1 | 20–40–1 |
| Turnovers | 1 | 2 |
| Time of possession | 33:06 | 26:54 |

| Team | Category | Player | Statistics |
|---|---|---|---|
| James Madison | Passing | Camden Coleman | 24/42, 243 yards, 4 TD, INT |
| James Madison | Rushing | George Pettaway | 16 carries, 110 yards |
| James Madison | Receiving | Corey Scott | 4 catches, 57 yards, TD |
| Old Dominion | Passing | Ryan Huff | 20/39, 261 yards, TD, INT |
| Old Dominion | Rushing | Devin Roche | 8 carries, 18 yards |
| Old Dominion | Receiving | TJ Johnson | 5 catches, 105 yards |

=== at Georgia State ===
Old Dominion Monarchs (1–3) at Georgia State Panthers (3–1) – Game summary

| Quarter | 1 | 2 | 3 | 4 | Total |
|---|---|---|---|---|---|
| Monarchs | 3 | 0 | 7 | 0 | 10 |
| Panthers | 14 | 14 | 14 | 0 | 42 |

at Center Parc Stadium • Atlanta, Georgia

- Date: October 3
- Game attendance: 17,854

Game information

First quarter
Second quarter
Third quarter
Fourth quarter

| Statistics | ODU | GAST |
|---|---|---|
| First downs | 11 | 23 |
| Plays–yards | 62–142 | 68–470 |
| Rushes–yards | 34–63 | 44–187 |
| Passing yards | 79 | 283 |
| Passing: comp–att–int | 13–28–0 | 15–24–0 |
| Turnovers | 1 | 1 |
| Time of possession | 25:28 | 34:32 |

| Team | Category | Player | Statistics |
|---|---|---|---|
| Old Dominion | Passing | Quinn Henicle | 8/15, 49 yards |
| Old Dominion | Rushing | Devin Roche | 9 carries, 37 yards |
| Old Dominion | Receiving | Josh Rodriguez | 3 catches, 22 yards |
| Georgia State | Passing | Cameran Brown | 14/20, 284 yards, 6 TD |
| Georgia State | Rushing | Qwantavius Wiggins | 15 carries, 87 yards |
| Georgia State | Receiving | Derrick Avery Jr. | 2 catches, 91 yards, TD |

=== at Appalachian State ===
Old Dominion Monarchs (1–4) at Appalachian State Mountaineers (3–1) – Game summary

| Quarter | 1 | 2 | 3 | 4 | Total |
|---|---|---|---|---|---|
| Monarchs | 0 | 0 | 2 | 8 | 10 |
| Mountaineers | 0 | 0 | 3 | 0 | 3 |

at Kidd Brewer Stadium • Boone, North Carolina

- Date: October 10
- Game attendance: 27,011

| Statistics | ODU | APP |
|---|---|---|
| First downs | 16 | 9 |
| Plays–yards | 81–304 | 55–158 |
| Rushes–yards | 61–207 | 28–92 |
| Passing yards | 97 | 66 |
| Passing: comp–att–int | 10–20–2 | 7–27–2 |
| Turnovers | 3 | 3 |
| Time of possession | 38:50 | 21:10 |

| Team | Category | Player | Statistics |
|---|---|---|---|
| Old Dominion | Passing | Quinn Henicle | 10/20, 97 yards, 2 INT |
| Old Dominion | Rushing | Devin Roche | 23 carries, 101 yards |
| Old Dominion | Receiving | Kendall Harris | 3 catches, 50 yards |
| Appalachian State | Passing | Malachi Singleton | 5/23, 72 yards, INT |
| Appalachian State | Rushing | Jaquari Lewis | 10 carries, 41 yards |
| Appalachian State | Receiving | Darrin Fugitt | 2 catches, 20 yards |

=== Georgia Southern ===
Georgia Southern Eagles (2–4) at Old Dominion Monarchs (2–4) – Game summary

| Quarter | 1 | 2 | 3 | 4 | Total |
|---|---|---|---|---|---|
| Eagles | 0 | 0 | 0 | 0 | 0 |
| Monarchs | 0 | 0 | 0 | 0 | 0 |

at S.B. Ballard Stadium • Norfolk, Virginia

- Date: October 15
- Game time: 7:30 p.m.

Game information

First quarter
Second quarter
Third quarter
Fourth quarter

| Statistics | GASO | ODU |
|---|---|---|
| First downs | | |
| Plays–yards | | |
| Rushes–yards | | |
| Passing yards | | |
| Passing: comp–att–int | | |
| Turnovers | | |
| Time of possession | | |

| Team | Category | Player | Statistics |
|---|---|---|---|
| Georgia Southern | Passing | | |
| Georgia Southern | Rushing | | |
| Georgia Southern | Receiving | | |
| Old Dominion | Passing | | |
| Old Dominion | Rushing | | |
| Old Dominion | Receiving | | |

=== at Louisiana Tech ===
Old Dominion Monarchs (2–5) at Louisiana Tech Bulldogs (4–2) – Game summary

| Quarter | 1 | 2 | 3 | 4 | Total |
|---|---|---|---|---|---|
| Monarchs | 0 | 0 | 0 | 0 | 0 |
| Bulldogs | 0 | 0 | 0 | 0 | 0 |

at Joe Aillet Stadium • Ruston, Louisiana

- Date: October 24

| Statistics | ODU | LT |
|---|---|---|
| First downs | | |
| Total yards | | |
| Rushing yards | | |
| Passing yards | | |
| Passing: comp–att–int | | |
| Turnovers | | |
| Time of possession | | |

| Team | Category | Player | Statistics |
|---|---|---|---|
| Old Dominion | Passing | | |
| Old Dominion | Rushing | | |
| Old Dominion | Receiving | | |
| Louisiana Tech | Passing | | |
| Louisiana Tech | Rushing | | |
| Louisiana Tech | Receiving | | |

=== Marshall ===
Marshall Thundering Herd (4–3) at Old Dominion Monarchs (2–6) – Game summary

| Quarter | 1 | 2 | 3 | 4 | Total |
|---|---|---|---|---|---|
| Thundering Herd | 17 | 10 | 3 | 6 | 36 |
| Monarchs | 7 | 3 | 7 | 6 | 23 |

at S.B. Ballard Stadium • Norfolk, Virginia

- Date: October 31
- Game time: 1:00 p.m.
- Game weather: Sunny • Temperature: 62 °F (17 °C) • Wind: W 11 mph
- Game attendance: 17,093
- Referee: Brandon Kirkland
- TV announcers (ESPN+): Scott Jackson (play-by-play) and Andy Mashaw (analyst)

Game information

First quarter

- (12:57) MRSH – TJ Lester 4 yard run, Jorge Diaz Nicolas kick (Drive: 4 plays, 26 yards, 1:37; Marshall 7–0)
- (6:50) MRSH – TJ Lester 49 yard run, Jorge Diaz Nicolas kick (Drive: 1 play, 49 yards, 0:08; Marshall 14–0)
- (4:19) ODU – Maurki James 6 yard run, Andrew Nelms kick (Drive: 5 plays, 77 yards, 2:23; Marshall 14–7)
- (1:27) MRSH – Jorge Diaz Nicolas 35 yard field goal (Drive: 7 plays, 52 yards, 2:47; Marshall 17–7)

Second quarter

- (10:53) ODU – Andrew Nelms 21 yard field goal (Drive: 8 plays, 64 yards, 3:48; Marshall 17–10)
- (1:13) MRSH – Jorge Diaz Nicolas 30 yard field goal (Drive: 12 plays, 78 yards, 4:27; Marshall 20–10)
- (0:00) MRSH – Xayvion Turner-Bradshaw 100 yard field goal return, Jorge Diaz Nicolas kick (Marshall 27–10)

Third quarter

- (13:03) ODU – Brandon Crutchfield 44 yard interception, Andrew Nelms kick (Marshall 27–17)
- (7:15) MRSH – Jorge Diaz Nicolas 34 yard field goal (Drive: 5 plays, 15 yards, 2:20; Marshall 30–17)

Fourth quarter

- (12:34) MRSH – Jorge Diaz Nicolas 30 yard field goal (Drive: 13 plays, 68 yards, 6:33; Marshall 33–17)
- (5:52) MRSH – Jorge Diaz Nicolas 24 yard field goal (Drive: 4 plays, 6 yards, 2:13; Marshall 36–17)
- (3:54) ODU – Maurki James 14 yard run, Jaxon Potter pass failed (Drive: 7 plays, 55 yards, 1:50; Marshall 36–23)

| Statistics | MRSH | ODU |
|---|---|---|
| First downs | 17 | 20 |
| Plays–yards | 72–338 | 74–409 |
| Rushes–yards | 54–196 | 29–80 |
| Passing yards | 142 | 329 |
| Passing: comp–att–int | 8–18–1 | 23–45–3 |
| Turnovers | 1 | 4 |
| Time of possession | 35:12 | 24:48 |

| Team | Category | Player | Statistics |
|---|---|---|---|
| Marshall | Passing | Carlos Del Rio-Wilson | 3/9, 66 yards |
| Marshall | Rushing | Judah Price | 15 carries, 82 yards |
| Marshall | Receiving | Chris Culliver | 2 receptions, 67 yards |
| Old Dominion | Passing | Jaxon Potter | 23/44, 329 yards, 3 INT |
| Old Dominion | Rushing | Trey Hall | 8 carries, 41 yards |
| Old Dominion | Receiving | Josh Rodriguez | 9 receptions, 143 yards |

=== at Coastal Carolina ===
Old Dominion Monarchs (2–7) at Coastal Carolina Chanticleers (3–5) – Game summary

| Quarter | 1 | 2 | 3 | 4 | Total |
|---|---|---|---|---|---|
| Monarchs | 0 | 0 | 0 | 0 | 0 |
| Chanticleers | 0 | 0 | 0 | 0 | 0 |

at Brooks Stadium • Conway, South Carolina

- Date: November 7

Game information

First Quarter

Second Quarter

Third Quarter

Fourth Quarter

| Statistics | ODU | CCU |
|---|---|---|
| First downs | | |
| Total yards | | |
| Rushing yards | | |
| Passing yards | | |
| Passing: Comp–Att–Int | | |
| Turnovers | | |
| Time of possession | | |

| Team | Category | Player | Statistics |
|---|---|---|---|
| Old Dominion | Passing | | |
| Old Dominion | Rushing | | |
| Old Dominion | Receiving | | |
| Coastal Carolina | Passing | | |
| Coastal Carolina | Rushing | | |
| Coastal Carolina | Receiving | | |

=== at UConn ===
Old Dominion Monarchs (3–7) at UConn Huskies (5–5) – Game summary

| Quarter | 1 | 2 | 3 | 4 | Total |
|---|---|---|---|---|---|
| Monarchs | 0 | 0 | 0 | 0 | 0 |
| Huskies | 0 | 0 | 0 | 0 | 0 |

at Rentschler Field • East Hartford, Connecticut

- Date: November 21
- Game time: 3:30 p.m.

Game information

First quarter
Second quarter
Third quarter
Fourth quarter

| Statistics | ODU | CONN |
|---|---|---|
| First downs | | |
| Plays–yards | | |
| Rushes–yards | | |
| Passing yards | | |
| Passing: comp–att–int | | |
| Turnovers | | |
| Time of possession | | |

| Team | Category | Player | Statistics |
|---|---|---|---|
| Old Dominion | Passing | | |
| Old Dominion | Rushing | | |
| Old Dominion | Receiving | | |
| UConn | Passing | | |
| UConn | Rushing | | |
| UConn | Receiving | | |

=== Southern Miss—Oyster Bowl ===
Southern Miss Golden Eagles (0–0) at Old Dominion Monarchs (0–0) – Game summary

| Quarter | 1 | 2 | 3 | 4 | Total |
|---|---|---|---|---|---|
| Golden Eagles | 0 | 0 | 0 | 0 | 0 |
| Monarchs | 0 | 0 | 0 | 0 | 0 |

at S.B. Ballard Stadium • Norfolk, Virginia

- Date: November 28

Game information

First quarter
Second quarter
Third quarter
Fourth quarter

| Statistics | USM | ODU |
|---|---|---|
| First downs | | |
| Plays–yards | | |
| Rushes–yards | | |
| Passing yards | | |
| Passing: comp–att–int | | |
| Turnovers | | |
| Time of possession | | |

| Team | Category | Player | Statistics |
|---|---|---|---|
| Southern Miss | Passing | | |
| Southern Miss | Rushing | | |
| Southern Miss | Receiving | | |
| Old Dominion | Passing | | |
| Old Dominion | Rushing | | |
| Old Dominion | Receiving | | |
