= 2026 James Madison Dukes football team =

American college football season

2026 James Madison Dukes football
- Conference: Sun Belt Conference
- East Division
- Record: 8–3 (5–2 Sun Belt)
- Head coach: Billy Napier (1st season)
- Offensive coordinator: Cam Aiken (1st season)
- Offensive scheme: Spread option
- Defensive coordinator: Robert Bala (1st season)
- Base defense: 3–3–5
- Home stadium: Bridgeforth Stadium

2026 Sun Belt Conference football standings
| | Conf. | | | Overall |
| Team | W | | L | W | | L |
|---|---|---|---|---|---|---|
East Division
| Georgia Southern | 6 | – | 1 | 7 | – | 4 |
| James Madison | 5 | – | 2 | 8 | – | 3 |
| Appalachian State | 4 | – | 3 | 7 | – | 4 |
| Coastal Carolina | 3 | – | 4 | 4 | – | 7 |
| Marshall | 3 | – | 4 | 6 | – | 5 |
| Georgia State | 2 | – | 5 | 5 | – | 6 |
| Old Dominion | 2 | – | 5 | 3 | – | 8 |
West Division
| Louisiana Tech xy | 7 | – | 0 | 9 | – | 2 |
| Louisiana | 5 | – | 2 | 8 | – | 3 |
| South Alabama | 4 | – | 3 | 6 | – | 5 |
| Arkansas State | 2 | – | 5 | 4 | – | 7 |
| Troy | 2 | – | 5 | 4 | – | 7 |
| Southern Miss | 2 | – | 5 | 3 | – | 8 |
| Louisiana–Monroe | 2 | – | 5 | 2 | – | 9 |
Championship: TBD vs. Louisiana Tech
$ – Conference champion; x – Division champion/co-champions; y – Championship game participant; As of November 22, 2026; Rankings from AP poll

The 2026 James Madison Dukes football team represents in the Sun Belt Conference's East Division during the 2026 NCAA Division I FBS football season. The Dukes are led by Billy Napier in his first season as the head coach. The Dukes play their home games at the Bridgeforth Stadium, located in Harrisonburg, Virginia.

== Offseason ==
=== Transfers ===
==== Outgoing ====
| Player | Position | Destination |
|---|---|---|
| Joseph Simmons | OL | Auburn |
| Andrew VanSlyke | P/K | Buffalo |
| Justin Eaglin | CB | Colorado |
| Immanuel Ezeogu | DE | Colorado |
| Blake Kendall Jr. | QB | Eastern Kentucky |
| Lacota Dippre | TE | Florida |
| Jamarcus Smith | WR | Garden City CC |
| Kai Callen | DB | Idaho State |
| Tyler Brown | S | Iowa |
| Trent Wilson | OL | Iowa |
| Jacob Hohenshelt | OL | Lafayette |
| Milt Ferguson | DB | Lenoir–Rhyne |
| Chauncey Logan | CB | Memphis |
| Phillip Harris | DB | New Hampshire |
| Ayo Adeyi | RB | Oklahoma State |
| Cristiano Rosa | K | Penn State |
| Tre Leonard | RB | Prairie View A&M |
| Yamir Knight | WR | SMU |
| Jerald James | DE | Towson |
| Alonza Barnett III | QB | UCF |
| DJ Barksdale | CB | UCLA |
| Landon Ellis | WR | UCLA |
| Aiden Gobaira | DL | UCLA |
| Trent Hendrick | LB | UCLA |
| Wayne Knight | RB | UCLA |
| Josh Phifer | TE | UCLA |
| JD Rayner | OL | UCLA |
| Riley Robell | OL | UCLA |
| Drew Spinogatti | LB | UCLA |
| Carter Sweazie | OL | UCLA |
| Sahir West | DL | UCLA |
| Stephen Hollander | DB | West Chester |
| Jacob Bailey | OL | Western Michigan |
| Max Lipinski | K | William & Mary |

==== Incoming ====
| Player | Position | Previous school |
|---|---|---|
| Josh Manecke | OL | Army |
| Andrew Bennett | P | Charlotte |
| Tyler Brown | OL | Colorado |
| Nick Herman | RB | Drake |
| Mitchell Dietzel | LS | Eastern Michigan |
| Mason Purham | DE | Emory & Henry |
| Jeremiah Harrison | WR | East Tennessee State |
| Cole Keller | TE | East Tennessee State |
| Hayden Ross | LS | East Tennessee State |
| Frankie Tinilau | OL | East Tennessee State |
| Jayon Harvey | DB | Findlay |
| Daniel Michel | OL | FIU |
| Noel Portnjagin | OL | Florida |
| Enoch Wangoy | OL | Florida |
| Terrence Jones | DB | Fordham |
| Jakolbi Wilson | DT | Fort Hays State |
| Lathan Croley | LB | Holy Cross |
| KD Mosley | TE | Howard |
| Danny Royster | DE | Indianapolis |
| Kaedin Massey | OL | Kansas State |
| Kei’Trone Simpson | DE | Lamar |
| Malachi Fannin-Render | RB | Liberty |
| Kylan Billiot | WR | LSU |
| Arrington Maiden | QB | Memphis |
| Baylen Woodman | K | Middle Tennessee |
| Seth Cromwell | RB | Northern Arizona |
| Nakian Jackson | LB | Nevada |
| Rasheed Lovelace | DT | Nicholls |
| Damier Minkah | CB | Shepherd |
| Javis Mynatt | DB | Texas State |
| Dwayne Kelly | CB | Toledo |
| Davi Belfort | QB | UCF |
| Micah Matthews | WR | Virginia Tech |
| DJ Fox | OL | Wisconsin–River Falls |
| Terell Thomas | Edge | Washburn |
| Noah Grevious | WR | VMI |
| JT Hooten | LB | West Alabama |
| Thatcher Miller | TE | West Chester |
| Kevin Roberts | DT | West Florida |
| Corey Scott | WR | West Florida |
| Chukwunedu Okeke | DT | Western Kentucky |
| Ernest Willor Jr. | DE | Wisconsin |

== Schedule ==
| Date | Time | Opponent | Site | TV | Result | Attendance |
|---|---|---|---|---|---|---|
| September 5 | 12:00 p.m. | Liberty* | Bridgeforth Stadium; Harrisonburg, VA (Battle of the Blue Ridge) | ESPNU | W 20–13 | 25,035 |
| September 12 | 3:30 p.m. | Wagner* | Bridgeforth Stadium; Harrisonburg, VA | ESPN+ | W 87–3 | 25,028 |
| September 19 | 10:00 p.m. | at San Diego State* | Snapdragon Stadium; San Diego, CA | The CW | W 26–13 | 26,487 |
| September 26 | 6:00 p.m. | at Old Dominion | S.B. Ballard Stadium; Norfolk, VA (Royal Rivalry) | ESPN+ | W 46–20 | 20,035 |
| October 3 | 3:45 p.m. | Marshall | Bridgeforth Stadium; Harrisonburg, VA | ESPNU | W 45–17 | 25,034 |
| October 10 | 7:30 p.m. | at Georgia Southern | Paulson Stadium; Statesboro, GA | ESPNU | W 27–24 | 20,545 |
| October 17 | 12:00 p.m. | Georgia State | Bridgeforth Stadium; Harrisonburg, VA | ESPNU | W 49–22 | 25,225 |
| October 22 | 7:00 p.m. | at Appalachian State | Kidd Brewer Stadium; Boone, NC | ESPNU | L 31–34 ^{OT} | 33,322 |
| October 29 | 7:30 p.m. | Troy | Bridgeforth Stadium; Harrisonburg, VA | ESPN2 | L 21–24 ^{OT} | 25,005 |
| November 5 | 8:00 p.m. | at Southern Miss | M. M. Roberts Stadium; Hattiesburg, MS | ESPN2 | W 54–23 | 24,182 |
| November 14 | 12:00 p.m. | at UConn* | Pratt & Whitney Stadium at Rentschler Field; East Hartford, CT | CBSSN | L 22–46 | 25,530 |
| November 28 | 2:00 p.m. | Coastal Carolina | Bridgeforth Stadium; Harrisonburg, VA | ESPN+ | | |
*Non-conference game; All times are in Central time

== Game summaries ==
=== Liberty (Battle of the Blue Ridge) ===
Liberty Flames (0–0) at James Madison Dukes (0–0) – Game summary

| Quarter | 1 | 2 | 3 | 4 | Total |
|---|---|---|---|---|---|
| Flames | 0 | 6 | 0 | 7 | 13 |
| Dukes | 7 | 10 | 3 | 0 | 20 |

at Bridgeforth Stadium • Harrisonburg, Virginia

- Date: September 5
- Game time: 12:00 p.m. EDT
- Game weather: Sunny
- Game attendance: 25,035
- Referee: Rodney Burnette
- TV announcers (ESPNU): Cooper Boardman (play-by-play) and Craig Haubert (analyst)

Game information

First quarter

- JMU – George Pettaway 7-yard run (Morgan Suarez kick), 4:23. Dukes 7–0. Drive: 12 plays, 80 yards, 4:16.

Second quarter

- LIB – Chase Reeves 30-yard field goal, 8:57. Dukes 7–3. Drive: 16 plays, 62 yards, 10:26.
- JMU – Morgan Suarez 46-yard field goal, 5:57. Dukes 10–3. Drive: 6 plays, 37 yards, 3:00.
- JMU – Corey Scott 5-yard pass from JC Evans (Morgan Suarez kick), 1:53. Dukes 17–3. Drive: 7 plays, 67 yards, 2:57.
- LIB – Chase Reeves 42-yard field goal, 0:00. Dukes 17–6. Drive: 7 plays, 51 yards, 1:53.

Third quarter

- JMU – Morgan Suarez 32-yard field goal, 11:11. Dukes 20–6. Drive: 9 plays, 45 yards, 3:41.

Fourth quarter

- LIB – Makai Jackson 34 yard pass from Deshawn Purdie (Chase Reeves kick), 8:33. Dukes 20–13. Drive: 4 plays, 61 yards, 1:28.

| Statistics | LIB | JMU |
|---|---|---|
| First downs | 19 | 15 |
| Plays–yards | 65–321 | 49–291 |
| Rushes–yards | 38–91 | 31–173 |
| Passing yards | 230 | 118 |
| Passing: Comp–Att–Int | 17–27–0 | 12-18–0 |
| Turnovers | 0 | 0 |
| Time of possession | 37:17 | 22:38 |

| Team | Category | Player | Statistics |
|---|---|---|---|
| Liberty | Passing | Deshawn Purdie | 17/27, 230 yards, TD |
| Liberty | Rushing | Kam Davis | 16 carries, 52 yards |
| Liberty | Receiving | Makai Jackson | 3 receptions, 73 yards, TD |
| James Madison | Passing | JC Evans | 7/9, 61 yards, TD |
| James Madison | Rushing | JC Evans | 9 carries, 69 yards |
| James Madison | Receiving | Noah Grevious | 4 receptions, 39 yards |

=== Wagner (FCS) ===
Wagner Seahawks (FCS) (1–1) at James Madison Dukes (1–0) – Game summary

| Quarter | 1 | 2 | 3 | 4 | Total |
|---|---|---|---|---|---|
| Seahawks (FCS) | 3 | 0 | 0 | 0 | 3 |
| Dukes | 21 | 21 | 24 | 21 | 87 |

at Bridgeforth Stadium • Harrisonburg, Virginia

- Date: September 12
- Game time: 3:30 p.m. EDT
- Game weather: Sunny
- Game attendance: 25,028
- Referee: Jeremy Parker
- TV announcers (ESPN+): Curt Dudley (play-by-play) and Brian Barlow (analyst)

Game information

First quarter

- JMU – Miles Halbert 9-yard punt return (Morgan Suarez kick), 13:31. Dukes 7–0. Drive: 3 plays, 4 yards, 1:29.
- WAG – Johnny DiSalvatore 40-yard field goal, 9:01. Dukes 7–3. Drive: 10 plays, 53 yards, 4:30.
- JMU – George Pettaway 1-yard run (Morgan Suarez kick), 7:46. Dukes 14–3. Drive: 3 plays, 5 yards, 1:01.
- JMU – George Pettaway 1-yard run (Morgan Suarez kick), 1:16. Dukes 21–3. Drive: 12 plays, 66 yards, 4:12.

Second quarter

- JMU – George Pettaway 32-yard run (Morgan Suarez kick), 13:09. Dukes 28–3. Drive: 2 plays, 34 yards, 0:36.
- JMU – Nick Herman 15-yard run (Morgan Suarez kick), 4:23. Dukes 35–3. Drive: 4 plays, 52 yards, 0:58.
- JMU – Michael Scott 76-yard punt return (Morgan Suarez kick), 1:00. Dukes 42–3. Drive: 6 plays, 14 yards, 2:07.

Third quarter

- JMU – Nick Herman 77-yard run (Morgan Suarez kick), 14:20. Dukes 49–3. Drive: 2 plays, 82 yards, 0:35.
- JMU – Michael Scott 66-yard punt return (Morgan Suarez kick), 12:04. Dukes 56–3. Drive: 3 plays, 8 yards, 2:16.
- JMU – Za'Ron Collins 18-yard pass from Camden Coleman (Morgan Suarez kick), 8:22. Dukes 63–3. Drive: 6 plays, 82 yards, 1:56.
- JMU – Morgan Suarez 46-yard field goal, 1:52. Dukes 66–3. Drive: 9 plays, 53 yards, 3:48.

Fourth quarter

- JMU – KD Mosley 20-yard pass from Arrington Maiden (Morgan Suarez kick), 14:39. Dukes 73–3. Drive: 2 plays, 39 yards, 0:27.
- JMU – Miles Halbert 44-yard pass from Arrington Maiden (Morgan Suarez kick), 6:48. Dukes 80–3. Drive: 7 plays, 81 yards, 3:14.
- JMU – Phoenix Donghia 1-yard run (Morgan Suarez kick), 0:22. Dukes 87–3. Drive: 6 plays, 70 yards, 1:50.

| Statistics | WAG | JMU |
|---|---|---|
| First downs | 10 | 27 |
| Plays–yards | 67–204 | 62–588 |
| Rushes–yards | 40–86 | 35–290 |
| Passing yards | 118 | 298 |
| Passing: Comp–Att–Int | 14–27–0 | 20–27–0 |
| Turnovers | 2 | 1 |
| Time of possession | 37:24 | 22:36 |

| Team | Category | Player | Statistics |
|---|---|---|---|
| Wagner | Passing | Benjamin Newman | 11/20, 101 yards |
| Wagner | Rushing | Uriah Moats-Maynard | 14 carries, 33 yards |
| Wagner | Receiving | Zion Fowler-El | 4 receptions, 45 yards |
| James Madison | Passing | Camden Coleman | 12/18, 171 yards, TD |
| James Madison | Rushing | Nick Herman | 8 carries, 132 yards, 2 TD |
| James Madison | Receiving | Corey Scott | 3 receptions, 52 yards |

=== at San Diego State ===
James Madison Dukes (2–0) at San Diego State Aztecs (1–1) – Game summary

| Quarter | 1 | 2 | 3 | 4 | Total |
|---|---|---|---|---|---|
| Dukes | 10 | 9 | 0 | 7 | 26 |
| Aztecs | 0 | 0 | 7 | 6 | 13 |

at Snapdragon Stadium • San Diego, California

- Date: September 19
- Game time: 10:00 p.m. EDT
- Game weather: Clear • Temperature: 71 °F (22 °C) • Wind: N at 4 miles per hour (6.4 km/h)
- Game attendance: 26,487
- Referee: John Love
- TV announcers (CW): Chris Fisher (play-by-play), Will Blackmon (analyst) and Michael Bumpus (sideline reporter)

Game information

First quarter

- JMU – Camden Coleman 4-yard run (Morgan Suarez kick), 12:14. Dukes 7–0. Drive: 6 plays, 75 yards, 2:46.
- JMU – Morgan Suarez 46-yard field goal, 4:03. Dukes 10–0. Drive: 14 plays, 55 yards, 4:38.

Second quarter

- JMU – Morgan Suarez 32-yard field goal, 14:13. Dukes 13–0. Drive: 10 plays, 60 yards, 3:31.
- JMU – Cole Keller 7-yard pass from Camden Coleman (two-point pass conversion failed), 0:30. Dukes 19–0. Drive: 2 plays, 9 yards, 0:26.

Third quarter

- SDSU – Javion Kinnard 3-yard run (Cooper DiLeva kick), 6:47. Dukes 19–7. Drive: 11 plays, 82 yards, 4:19.

Fourth quarter

- JMU – Cole Keller 20-yard pass from Camden Coleman (Morgan Suarez kick), 12:54. Dukes 26–7. Drive: 8 plays, 74 yards, 3:11.
- SDSU – Nathan Acevedo 14-yard pass from Jayden Denegal (two-point conversion run failed), 8:52. Dukes 26–13. Drive: 10 plays, 75 yards, 4:02.

| Statistics | JMU | SDSU |
|---|---|---|
| First downs | 20 | 21 |
| Plays–yards | 74-417 | 77-401 |
| Rushes–yards | 47-171 | 44-192 |
| Passing yards | 246 | 209 |
| Passing: comp–att–int | 19-27-0 | 18-33-2 |
| Time of possession | 30:19 | 29:41 |

| Team | Category | Player | Statistics |
|---|---|---|---|
| James Madison | Passing | Camden Coleman | 19/27, 246 yards, 2 TD |
| James Madison | Rushing | George Pettaway | 20 carries, 82 yards |
| James Madison | Receiving | Braeden Wisloski | 5 receptions, 90 yards |
| San Diego State | Passing | Jayden Denegal | 18/33, 209 yards, TD, 2 INT |
| San Diego State | Rushing | Javion Kinnard | 33 carries, 181 yards, TD |
| San Diego State | Receiving | Javion Kinnard | 4 receptions, 70 yards |

=== at Old Dominion (Royal Rivalry) ===
James Madison Dukes (3–0) at Old Dominion Monarchs (1–2) – Game summary

| Quarter | 1 | 2 | 3 | 4 | Total |
|---|---|---|---|---|---|
| Dukes | 0 | 0 | 0 | 0 | 0 |
| Monarchs | 0 | 0 | 0 | 0 | 0 |

at S.B. Ballard Stadium • Norfolk, Virginia

- Date: September 26
- Game time: 6:00 p.m. EDT
- Game attendance: 20,035
- TV: ESPN+

| Statistics | JMU | ODU |
|---|---|---|
| First downs | | |
| Plays–yards | | |
| Rushes–yards | | |
| Passing yards | | |
| Passing: comp–att–int | | |
| Time of possession | | |

| Team | Category | Player | Statistics |
|---|---|---|---|
| James Madison | Passing | | |
| James Madison | Rushing | | |
| James Madison | Receiving | | |
| Old Dominion | Passing | | |
| Old Dominion | Rushing | | |
| Old Dominion | Receiving | | |

=== Marshall ===
Marshall Thundering Herd (3–1) at James Madison Dukes (4–0) – Game summary

| Quarter | 1 | 2 | 3 | 4 | Total |
|---|---|---|---|---|---|
| Thundering Herd | 7 | 7 | 3 | 0 | 17 |
| Dukes | 10 | 28 | 0 | 7 | 45 |

at Bridgeforth Stadium • Harrisonburg, Virginia

- Date: October 3
- Game time: 3:45 p.m. EDT
- Game weather: Sunny
- Game attendance: 25,034
- Referee: Marty Adams
- TV announcers (ESPNU): Ted Emrich (play-by-play) and Fozzy Whittaker (analyst)

Game information

First quarter

- (6:35) MRSH – Xayvion Turner-Bradshaw 3 yard pass from Carlos Del Rio-Wilson, Jorge Diaz Nicolas kick (Drive: 14 plays, 89 yards, 6:16; Marshall 7–0)
- (5:40) JMU – Corey Scott 53 yard pass from Camden Coleman, Morgan Suarez kick (Drive: 3 plays, 55 yards, 0:46; Tied 7–7)
- (2:38) JMU – Morgan Suarez 22 yard field goal (Drive: 5 plays, 43 yards, 1:56; James Madison 10–7)

Second quarter

- (14:26) MRSH – TJ Lester 1 yard run, Jorge Diaz Nicolas kick (Drive: 8 plays, 76 yards, 3:07; Marshall 14–10)
- (11:52) JMU – Corey Scott 12 yard pass from Camden Coleman, Morgan Suarez kick (Drive: 6 plays, 81 yards, 2:29; James Madison 17–14)
- (9:46) JMU – George Pettaway 73 yard run, Morgan Suarez kick (Drive: 2 plays, 73 yards, 0:16; James Madison 24–14)
- (2:45) JMU – George Pettaway 33 yard run, Morgan Suarez kick (Drive: 9 plays, 80 yards, 2:44; James Madison 31–14)
- (0:26) JMU – Noah Grevious 20 yard pass from Camden Coleman, Morgan Suarez kick (Drive: 6 plays, 54 yards, 1:12; James Madison 38–14)

Third quarter

- (7:18) MRSH – Jorge Diaz Nicolas 27 yard field goal (Drive: 5 plays, 3 yards, 1:38; James Madison 38–17)

Fourth quarter

- (0:50) JMU – Nick Harmon 3 yard run, Morgan Suarez kick (Drive: 11 plays, 80 yards, 5:04; James Madison 45–17)

| Statistics | MRSH | JMU |
|---|---|---|
| First downs | 23 | 25 |
| Plays–yards | 81–444 | 67–573 |
| Rushes–yards | 30–135 | 35–310 |
| Passing yards | 309 | 263 |
| Passing: comp–att–int | 29–51–2 | 21–32–0 |
| Turnovers | 2 | 1 |
| Time of possession | 31:55 | 28:05 |

| Team | Category | Player | Statistics |
|---|---|---|---|
| Marshall | Passing | Carlos Del Rio-Wilson | 21/37, 221 yards, TD, INT |
| Marshall | Rushing | Jo'Shon Barbie | 7 carries, 44 yards |
| Marshall | Receiving | Khalil Wilkins | 2 receptions, 62 yards |
| James Madison | Passing | Camden Coleman | 21/32, 263 yards, 3 TD |
| James Madison | Rushing | George Pettaway | 14 carries, 206 yards, 2 TD |
| James Madison | Receiving | Corey Scott | 5 receptions, 104 yards, 2 TD |

=== at Georgia Southern ===
James Madison Dukes (5–0) at Georgia Southern Eagles (2–3) – Game summary

| Quarter | 1 | 2 | 3 | 4 | Total |
|---|---|---|---|---|---|
| Dukes | 0 | 0 | 0 | 0 | 0 |
| Eagles | 0 | 0 | 0 | 0 | 0 |

at Paulson Stadium • Statesboro, Georgia

- Date: October 10
- Game time: 7:30 p.m. EDT
- Game attendance: 20,545
- TV: ESPNU

| Statistics | JMU | GASO |
|---|---|---|
| First downs | | |
| Plays–yards | | |
| Rushes–yards | | |
| Passing yards | | |
| Passing: comp–att–int | | |
| Time of possession | | |

| Team | Category | Player | Statistics |
|---|---|---|---|
| James Madison | Passing | | |
| James Madison | Rushing | | |
| James Madison | Receiving | | |
| Georgia Southern | Passing | | |
| Georgia Southern | Rushing | | |
| Georgia Southern | Receiving | | |

=== Georgia State ===
Georgia State Panthers (4–1) at James Madison Dukes (6–0) – Game summary

| Quarter | 1 | 2 | 3 | 4 | Total |
|---|---|---|---|---|---|
| Panthers | 0 | 0 | 0 | 0 | 0 |
| Dukes | 0 | 0 | 0 | 0 | 0 |

at Bridgeforth Stadium • Harrisonburg, Virginia

- Date: October 17
- Game time: 12:00 p.m. EDT
- Game attendance: 25,225
- TV: ESPNU

Game information

First quarter

Second quarter

Third quarter

Fourth quarter

| Statistics | GAST | JMU |
|---|---|---|
| First downs | | |
| Total yards | | |
| Rushing yards | | |
| Passing yards | | |
| Passing: Comp–Att–Int | | |
| Time of possession | | |

| Team | Category | Player | Statistics |
|---|---|---|---|
| Georgia State | Passing | | |
| Georgia State | Rushing | | |
| Georgia State | Receiving | | |
| James Madison | Passing | | |
| James Madison | Rushing | | |
| James Madison | Receiving | | |

=== at Appalachian State ===
James Madison Dukes (7–0) at Appalachian State Mountaineers (4–2) – Game summary

| Quarter | 1 | 2 | 3 | 4 | Total |
|---|---|---|---|---|---|
| Dukes | 0 | 0 | 0 | 0 | 0 |
| Mountaineers | 0 | 0 | 0 | 0 | 0 |

at Kidd Brewer Stadium • Boone, North Carolina

- Date: October 22
- Game time: 7:00 p.m. EDT
- Game attendance: 33,322
- TV announcers (ESPNU): Taylor Zarzour (play-by-play), Jeff Woody (analyst) and Michella Chester (sideline)

| Statistics | JMU | APP |
|---|---|---|
| First downs | | |
| Plays–yards | | |
| Rushes–yards | | |
| Passing yards | | |
| Passing: comp–att–int | | |
| Time of possession | | |

| Team | Category | Player | Statistics |
|---|---|---|---|
| James Madison | Passing | | |
| James Madison | Rushing | | |
| James Madison | Receiving | | |
| Appalachian State | Passing | | |
| Appalachian State | Rushing | | |
| Appalachian State | Receiving | | |

=== Troy ===
Troy Trojans (3–4) at James Madison Dukes (7–1) – Game summary

| Quarter | 1 | 2 | 3 | 4 | Total |
|---|---|---|---|---|---|
| Trojans | 0 | 0 | 0 | 0 | 0 |
| Dukes | 0 | 0 | 0 | 0 | 0 |

at Bridgeforth Stadium • Harrisonburg, Virginia

- Date: October 29
- Game time: 7:30 p.m. EDT
- Game attendance: 25,005
- TV: ESPN2

Game information

First quarter

Second quarter

Third quarter

Fourth quarter

| Statistics | TROY | JMU |
|---|---|---|
| First downs | | |
| Total yards | | |
| Rushing yards | | |
| Passing yards | | |
| Passing: Comp–Att–Int | | |
| Time of possession | | |

| Team | Category | Player | Statistics |
|---|---|---|---|
| Troy | Passing | | |
| Troy | Rushing | | |
| Troy | Receiving | | |
| James Madison | Passing | | |
| James Madison | Rushing | | |
| James Madison | Receiving | | |

=== at Southern Miss ===
James Madison Dukes (7–2) at Southern Miss Golden Eagles (3–5) – Game summary

| Quarter | 1 | 2 | 3 | 4 | Total |
|---|---|---|---|---|---|
| Dukes | 0 | 0 | 0 | 0 | 0 |
| Golden Eagles | 0 | 0 | 0 | 0 | 0 |

at M.M. Roberts Stadium • Hattiesburg, Mississippi

- Date: November 5
- Game time: 8:00 p.m. EDT
- Game attendance: 24,182
- TV: ESPN2

| Statistics | JMU | USM |
|---|---|---|
| First downs | | |
| Plays–yards | | |
| Rushes–yards | | |
| Passing yards | | |
| Passing: comp–att–int | | |
| Time of possession | | |

| Team | Category | Player | Statistics |
|---|---|---|---|
| James Madison | Passing | | |
| James Madison | Rushing | | |
| James Madison | Receiving | | |
| Southern Miss | Passing | | |
| Southern Miss | Rushing | | |
| Southern Miss | Receiving | | |

=== at UConn ===
James Madison Dukes (8–2) at UConn Huskies (4–5) – Game summary

| Quarter | 1 | 2 | 3 | 4 | Total |
|---|---|---|---|---|---|
| Dukes | 6 | 7 | 0 | 9 | 22 |
| Huskies | 10 | 10 | 6 | 20 | 46 |

at Rentschler Field • East Hartford, Connecticut

- Date: November 14
- Game time: 12:00 p.m. EDT
- Game weather: Cloudy • Temperature: 45 °F (7 °C) • Wind: NW at 9 miles per hour (14 km/h)
- Game attendance: 25,530
- Referee: Nolan Dumas
- TV announcers (CBSSN): Chris Lewis (play-by-play), Doug Pederson (analyst) and Hailey Sutton (sideline)

Game information

First quarter

- CONN - O'Connor, Jack 28 yd field goal, 9:21. Huskies 3–0. Drive: 12 plays, 65 yards, TOP 05:39
- JMU - Evans, JC 1 yd run (Run no good), 2:24. Dukes 6–3. Drive: 14 plays, 79 yards, TOP 06:53
- CONN - Wilson, Ky 100 yd kickoff return (O'Connor, Jack kick), 2:09. Huskies 10–6. Drive: 1 plays, 100 yards, TOP 0:00

Second quarter

- JMU - Wisloski, Braeden 16 yd pass from Evans, JC (Suarez, Morgan kick), 2:02. Dukes 13–10. Drive: 8 plays, 78 yards, TOP 04:27
- CONN - Porter, Shamar 67 yd pass from Osborne, Kalieb (Baker, Mike kick), 1:30. Huskies 17–13. Drive: 3 plays, 84 yards, TOP 00:28
- CONN - Baker, Mike 21 yd field goal, 0:00. Huskies 20–13. Drive: 3 plays, 56 yards, TOP 00:32

Third quarter

- CONN - Bowers, Cyncir 9 yd run (run no good), 0:55. Huskies 26–13. Drive: 11 plays, 72 yards, TOP 05:14

Fourth quarter

- JMU - Suarez, Morgan 36 yd field goal, 13:12. Huskies 26–16. Drive: 9 plays, 57 yards, TOP 02:43
- CONN - Willoughby, JD 35 yd pass from Osborne, Kalieb (Baker, Mike kick), 10:42. Huskies 33–16. Drive: 6 plays, 82 yards, TOP 02:24
- CONN - Bowers, Cyncir 2 yd pass from Osborne, Kalieb (kick no good), 5:44. Huskies 39–16. Drive: 6 plays, 59 yards, TOP 03:24
- JMU - Evans, JC 3 yd run (pass no good), 3:53. Huskies 39–22. Drive: 5 plays, 56 yards, TOP 01:45
- CONN - Bowers, Cyncir 17 yd run (Baker, Mike kick), 2:39. Huskies 46–22. Drive: 5 plays, 44 yards, TOP 01:13

| Statistics | JMU | CONN |
|---|---|---|
| First downs | 21 | 27 |
| Plays–yards | 69–331 | 68–504 |
| Rushes–yards | 27–95 | 48–230 |
| Passing yards | 236 | 274 |
| Passing: comp–att–int | 27–42–1 | 16–20–0 |
| Turnovers | 1 | 0 |
| Time of possession | 28:07 | 31:53 |

| Team | Category | Player | Statistics |
|---|---|---|---|
| James Madison | Passing | JC Evans | 27/42, 236 yards, TD |
| James Madison | Rushing | JC Evans | 17 carries, 49 yards, 2 TD |
| James Madison | Receiving | Braeden Wisloski | 7 receptions, 75 yards, TD |
| UConn | Passing | Kalieb Osborne | 16/20, 274 yards, 3 TD |
| UConn | Rushing | Cyncir Bowers | 25 carries, 123 yards, 2 TD |
| UConn | Receiving | Shamar Porter | 4 receptions, 135 yards, TD |

=== Coastal Carolina ===
Coastal Carolina Chanticleers (0–0) at James Madison Dukes (8–3) – Game summary

| Quarter | 1 | 2 | 3 | 4 | Total |
|---|---|---|---|---|---|
| Chanticleers | 0 | 0 | 0 | 0 | 0 |
| Dukes | 0 | 0 | 0 | 0 | 0 |

at Bridgeforth Stadium • Harrisonburg, Virginia

- Date: November 28
- Game time: 2:00 p.m. EDT
- TV: ESPN+

Game information

First quarter

Second quarter

Third quarter

Fourth quarter

| Statistics | CCU | JMU |
|---|---|---|
| First downs | | |
| Total yards | | |
| Rushing yards | | |
| Passing yards | | |
| Passing: Comp–Att–Int | | |
| Time of possession | | |

| Team | Category | Player | Statistics |
|---|---|---|---|
| Coastal Carolina | Passing | | |
| Coastal Carolina | Rushing | | |
| Coastal Carolina | Receiving | | |
| James Madison | Passing | | |
| James Madison | Rushing | | |
| James Madison | Receiving | | |

== Personnel ==
2026 James Madison Dukes football team roster
Players
Coaches
Offense

| Pos. | # | Name | Class |
|---|---|---|---|
| TE | 0 | Cole Keller | Sr |
| QB | 1 | JC Evans | So |
| WR | 2 | Jayden Mines | Sr |
| WR | 3 | Corey Scott | Jr |
| QB | 5 | Arrington Maiden | So |
| RB | 6 | George Pettaway | Sr |
| QB | 7 | Camden Coleman | Sr |
| WR | 8 | Jeremiah Harrison | So |
| WR | 9 | Davi Belfort | So |
| WR | 10 | Braeden Wisloski | Sr |
| WR | 11 | Noah Grevious | So |
| WR | 12 | Za'Ron Collins | Jr |
| TE | 13 | KD Mosley | Jr |
| QB | 14 | Tanner Vibabul | Fr |
| WR | 15 | Elijah Moss | Fr |
| WR | 16 | Arrion Concepcion | So |
| WR | 17 | Michael Scott | So |
| WR | 18 | Kylan Billiot | So |
| RB | 20 | Malachi Fannin-Render | So |
| RB | 21 | Jackson McCarter | So |
| RB | 23 | Nick Herman | So |
| WR | 24 | Kaleb Smith | Fr |
| RB | 27 | Phoenix Donghia | Fr |
| WR | 28 | Micah Matthews | So |
| WR | 30 | Trace Burney | Fr |
| RB | 33 | Trashon Dye | So |
| RB | 34 | Seth Cromwell | Sr |
| WR | 40 | Zion Hudson | Fr |
| WR | 43 | Miles Halbert | So |
| TE | 44 | Max Roche | Fr |
| OL | 50 | Jesse Sears | Fr |
| OL | 52 | Jack Harris | Fr |
| OL | 53 | Daniel Michel | Jr |
| OL | 54 | Jonah Smith | Fr |
| OL | 55 | JaKobe Campbell | So |
| OL | 56 | Tyler Brown | GS |
| OL | 58 | Griffin Hart | Jr |
| OL | 60 | Zach Greenberg | Sr |
| OL | 65 | Parker Cunningham | So |
| OL | 70 | Noel Portnjagin | So |
| OL | 71 | Deacon Rawls | So |
| OL | 72 | Kaedin Massey | So |
| OL | 73 | Evan Bushong | So |
| OL | 74 | Sani Reed | So |
| OL | 75 | Wyatt Maines | So |
| OL | 76 | Frankie Tinilau | Jr |
| OL | 77 | DJ Fox | Sr |
| OL | 78 | Josh Manecke | Jr |
| WR | 81 | Chase Pensyl | So |
| TE | 82 | Thatcher Miller | Sr |
| WR | 83 | Xavier McDonald | Fr |
| TE | 84 | Brian Hnat | So |
| TE | 85 | Ryder Post | So |
| TE | 86 | Ethan Gurela | So |
| WR | 88 | Dylan Williams | Jr |
| TE | 89 | Thomas Guillemette | Fr |

Defense

| Pos. | # | Name | Class |
|---|---|---|---|
| EDGE | 0 | Mason Purham | Jr |
| CB | 1 | Damier Minkah | Jr |
| LB | 2 | Nakian Jackson | Sr |
| LB | 3 | Gannon Weathersby | Sr |
| DL | 5 | Kevin Roberts | Jr |
| CB | 6 | DJ Kelly | So |
| CB | 7 | Roddrey McWilliams | So |
| S | 7 | Javis Mynatt | Sr |
| DL | 8 | Amar Thomas | Sr |
| EDGE | 9 | Kei'Trone Simpson | Sr |
| DL | 10 | Chukwunedu Okeke | Jr |
| CB | 11 | LaRon Dues | Fr |
| LB | 12 | Lathan Croley | Jr |
| EDGE | 13 | Ernest Willor Jr. | So |
| S | 14 | KJ Flowe | Jr |
| LB | 15 | JT Hooten | So |
| S | 16 | TJ McGill | Jr |
| EDGE | 17 | Danny Royster | Sr |
| S | 18 | Jase Rhodes | Fr |
| S | 22 | Chase Regan | Jr |
| CB | 23 | Ken Willis | Sr |
| S | 24 | Jayon Harvey | Jr |
| S | 25 | Terrance Jones | Jr |
| LB | 26 | Jayden Studio | Jr |
| CB | 27 | Jamal Olford | So |
| CB | 28 | Kamden Jennings | Fr |
| CB | 29 | KJ Wright | Fr |
| S | 30 | D'Kwan Thomas | Fr |
| S | 31 | Seth Gathers | So |
| S | 32 | Chase Miller | Sr |
| CB | 33 | Trey Gibson | Fr |
| S | 35 | Joshua Prince | So |
| LB | 40 | Josiah Perry | Fr |
| CB | 41 | George Lovelace | So |
| LB | 42 | JT Kouame-Yao | 5th |
| EDGE | 44 | Kacey Gilliam | Fr |
| LB | 45 | Lee Johnson | So |
| S | 47 | Kevin Kabasele | So |
| DL | 51 | Chris Bispham | Fr |
| DL | 55 | Rasheed Lovelace | Sr |
| DL | 88 | Kells Bush | Sr |
| EDGE | 90 | Cory Simon | Fr |
| DL | 91 | Jakolbi Wilson | Sr |
| EDGE | 92 | Grayson Gilmore | So |
| DL | 93 | Mychal McMullin | Jr |
| EDGE | 98 | Turner Schmidt | Jr |
| DL | 99 | Cole Webster | So |

Special teams

| Pos. | # | Name | Class |
|---|---|---|---|
| K | 5 | Morgan Suarez | Sr |
| P | 11 | Patrick Rea | Sr |
| LS | 37 | Hayden Ross | So |
| LS | 47 | Mitchell Dietzel | Sr |
| P | 84 | Andrew Bennett | So |
| K | 95 | Baylen Woodman | So |

Head coach

- Billy Napier

Coordinators/assistant coaches

- Cam Aiken (Offensive coordinator)
- Robert Bala (Defensive coordinator)
- Rob Wenger (Special teams coordinator)
- Aaron Pflugrad (Quarterbacks)
- William Peagler (Running backs)
- RJ Fleming (Wide receivers)
- Rob Sale (Offensive line)
- Bryan Schor (Tight ends)
- Kali James Jr. (Defensive line)
- Josh Linam (Co-defensive coordinator / linebackers)
- Dave Plungas (Assistant head coach / outside linebackers)
- Jireh Wilson (Edges)
- Kyle Barnes (Cornerbacks)
- Brandon Bailey (Safeties)
- Alex Loytty (Special teams analyst)

Legend

- (C) Team captain
- (S) Suspended
- (I) Ineligible
- Injured
- Redshirt

Roster
Last update: October 17, 2026
