= 2026 Marshall Thundering Herd football team =

American college football season

2026 Marshall Thundering Herd football
- Conference: Sun Belt Conference
- East Division
- Record: 6–5 (3–4 Sun Belt)
- Head coach: Tony Gibson (2nd season)
- Offensive coordinator: Rod Smith (2nd season; fired November 15); Gunter Brewer (interim)
- Offensive scheme: Spread option
- Defensive coordinator: Brad Lambert (1st season)
- Base defense: 3–3–5
- Home stadium: Joan C. Edwards Stadium

2026 Sun Belt Conference football standings
	Conf.			Overall
Team	W		L	W		L
East Division
Georgia Southern	6	–	1	7	–	4
James Madison	5	–	2	8	–	3
Appalachian State	4	–	3	7	–	4
Coastal Carolina	3	–	4	4	–	7
Marshall	3	–	4	6	–	5
Georgia State	2	–	5	5	–	6
Old Dominion	2	–	5	3	–	8
West Division
Louisiana Tech xy	7	–	0	9	–	2
Louisiana	5	–	2	8	–	3
South Alabama	4	–	3	6	–	5
Arkansas State	2	–	5	4	–	7
Troy	2	–	5	4	–	7
Southern Miss	2	–	5	3	–	8
Louisiana–Monroe	2	–	5	2	–	9
Championship: TBD vs. Louisiana Tech
$ – Conference champion; x – Division champion/co-champions; y – Championship game participant; As of November 22, 2026; Rankings from AP poll

The 2026 Marshall Thundering Herd football team will represent Marshall University in the Sun Belt Conference's East Division during the 2026 NCAA Division I FBS football season. The Thundering Herd will be led by Tony Gibson in his second year as the head coach. The Thundering Herd play their home games at the Joan C. Edwards Stadium, located in Huntington, West Virginia.

== Preseason ==
=== Media poll ===
In the Sun Belt preseason coaches' poll, the Thundering Herd were picked to finish third place in the East division.

Quarterback Carlos Del Rio-Wilson was named the Preseason Offensive Player of the Year. Quarterback Carlos Del Rio-Wilson, tight end Toby Payne, wide receiver Adrian Norton, offensive linemen Jalen Slappy and Tariq Montgomery, and defensive back Daytione Smith were awarded to be in the preseason All-Sun Belt first team offensive and defensive teams, respectively. Defensive end Braydin Ward, linebacker Javae Gilmore, and return specialist Xayvion Turner-Bradshaw were awarded to be in the preseason All-Sun Belt second team defense and special teams, respectively.

== Schedule ==
Date	Time	Opponent	Site	TV	Result	Attendance
September 5	3:30 p.m.	at No. 18 Penn State*	Beaver Stadium; University Park, PA	FS1	L 0–45	108,489
September 12	7:00 p.m.	Middle Tennessee*	Joan C. Edwards Stadium; Huntington, WV	ESPN+	W 28–26	25,662
September 19	6:30 p.m.	at Missouri State*	Robert W. Plaster Stadium; Springfield, MO	CBSSN	W 30–24	16,010
September 26	3:30 p.m.	Gardner–Webb*^{†}	Joan C. Edwards Stadium; Huntington, WV	ESPN+	W 36–35	25,710
October 3	3:45 p.m.	at James Madison	Bridgeforth Stadium; Harrisonburg, VA	ESPNU	L 17–45	25,034
October 10	7:00 p.m.	Coastal Carolina	Joan C. Edwards Stadium; Huntington, WV	ESPN+	L 21–27	23,029
October 20	7:30 p.m.	South Alabama	Joan C. Edwards Stadium; Huntington, WV	ESPN2	W 20–13	21,904
October 31	1:00 p.m.	at Old Dominion	S.B. Ballard Stadium; Norfolk, VA	ESPN+	W 36–23	17,093
November 7	3:30 p.m.	at Georgia Southern	Paulson Stadium; Statesboro, GA	ESPN+	L 13–49	24,023
November 14	6:00 p.m.	Appalachian State	Joan C. Edwards Stadium; Huntington, WV (rivalry)	ESPN+	L 16–20	23,675
November 21	4:00 p.m.	Georgia State	Joan C. Edwards Stadium; Huntington, WV	ESPN+	W 28–27	24,560
November 28	1:00 p.m.	at Louisiana–Monroe	Malone Stadium; Monroe, LA	ESPN+		
*Non-conference game; ^{†}Homecoming; Rankings from AP Poll and CFP Rankings released prior to game; All times are in Eastern time

== Personnel ==
=== Roster ===
2026 Marshall Thundering Herd football team roster
Players
Coaches
Offense

Pos.	#	Name	Class
WR	0	De'Andre Tamarez	Sr
QB	1	Zion Turner	Sr
WR	2	Adrian Norton	Sr
WR	3	Chris Culliver	Jr
QB	4	Khalil Wilkins	So
WR	5	Xayvion Turner-Bradshaw	Sr
RB	6	Jo'Shon Barbie	Sr
QB	7	Carlos Del Rio-Wilson	Sr
WR	8	Sherone White Jr.	So
WR	9	Christian Hamilton	Jr
WR	10	Judah Price	So
WR	11	Drew Williams	Fr
QB	12	Koi Fagan	Fr
WR	13	Brennan Chambers	Fr
WR	15	Josiah McLaurin	So
WR	16	Jalyn Abercrombie	Fr
QB	17	Dylan Barber	Fr
WR	18	Justin Haggerty	Jr
WR	19	Tony Martin	Jr
WR	20	Owen Sweeney	So
RB	21	TJ Lester	So
RB	22	Anthony Quinn Jr.	Fr
WR	23	Chase Massey	So
WR	24	Aiden Burke	Fr
OL	50	Jae'Von White	Fr
OL	52	Rhett McGrew	Fr
OL	53	Mason Ramsey	Fr
OL	54	Drake Lanham	Fr
OL	55	Holden Grieger	So
OL	56	Andrew Dudley	Fr
OL	57	Logan Greer	Jr
OL	59	Evan Ferguson	Sr
OL	61	Da'Ron Parks	Fr
OL	62	Marwan Diab	Fr
OL	64	Jaquez Joiner	Fr
OL	65	Parker Brault	Fr
OL	66	Eli Kaufman	Fr
OL	67	Jack Laird	Fr
OL	69	William Sandfoss	Fr
OL	70	Jalen Slappy	Sr
OL	73	Robby Martin	So
OL	74	Justin Lyles	Fr
OL	76	Tariq Montgomery	Sr
OL	77	Isaac Clary	Jr
OL	78	Xavier Bausley	Sr
TE	80	Shawn Rouse	Jr
TE	81	Toby Payne	Sr
WR	84	Nico Wiedmann	So
TE	85	Tracy Stephens	Jr
TE	86	Brandon Hettwer	Fr

Defense

Pos.	#	Name	Class
DB	0	Caleb Clark-Glover	Jr
CB	1	Boogie Trotter	Sr
DB	2	Charles McCartherens	Jr
S	3	Terrente Hinton	Sr
DB	4	Philipp Davis	Jr
LB	5	Javae Gilmore	Sr
LB	6	Jalen Marshall	GS
EDGE	7	Kelvon McBride	Jr
CB	8	Eddie Pleasant III	Jr
CB	9	Brayden Hall	Sr
LB	10	Chason Clark	Jr
DB	11	Josh Pierre-Louis	GS
DB	12	Louikenzy Jules	Jr
DL	14	Mickel Williams	Sr
S	15	Tristan Lester	Fr
S	16	Kendell Anderson	Jr
S	17	Daytione Smith	Sr
DB	18	Daniel Harris	Jr
S	19	Zah Jackson	Fr
S	20	Zeke Gunn	Fr
EDGE	21	Keydel Painter	Jr
S	22	Jaycee Houston	Fr
DB	23	Sammy Etienne	Fr
DL	24	Jacarius Clayton	Sr
LB	25	Andrew Hamad	So
LB	27	Cannon Lewis	So
S	28	Aumad Edwards	Fr
CB	29	Jason Haggerty	Jr
LB	30	Jaasai Simmons	Fr
LB	31	Brysen Davies	Fr
S	32	Pete Schuh	Sr
LB	33	Andre Parker	Fr
DL	34	Caden Turner	Fr
CB	37	Atley Cowan	So
ATH	39	Dawson Hill	Fr
LB	40	Ryan Ayers	Sr
DL	44	Kenyatta Hardge	So
LB	47	EahJay McAdams	Fr
DL	49	Mekhi Lockhart	Fr
DL	51	Jaxson Cunningham	So
DL	52	Mikailin Warren	Jr
DL	55	Cole Funderburk	Fr
DL	58	Braydin Ward	Jr
DL	90	B.J. Carter	Fr
DL	92	Cam Chmura	So
DL	95	Donovan Garrett	So
DT	97	Nate Blanc	Fr
DL	98	Terry Nwabuisi-Ezeala	Fr
DL	99	Simeon John	Jr

Special teams

Pos.	#	Name	Class
LS	35	Riley Winkler	Fr
K	41	Jorge Diaz Nicolas	Fr
LS	43	Chase Ortiz	So
K	90	Samuel Guiden Krebs	Fr
P	91	Cooper Heimbach	Fr
K	96	Ty Powell	Fr

Head coach

- Tony Gibson (Glenville State)

Coordinators/assistant coaches

- Rod Smith (Glenville State)
  Offensive coordinator/QB
- Brad Lambert (Kansas State)
  Defensive coordinator/LB
- Jackson White (Marshall)
  Special teams coordinator
- Anthony Leonard (West Virginia)
  Run game coordinator/DL
- Bob McClain (Waynesburg)
  Offensive line
- Rod McDowell (Clemson)
  Running backs
- Gunter Brewer (Wake Forest)
  Tight ends
- Chansi Stuckey (Clemson)
  Wide receivers
- Dean Hood (Ohio Wesleyan)
  Safeties
- Chip West (Livingstone)
  Cornerbacks

Legend

- (C) Team captain
- (S) Suspended
- (I) Ineligible
- Injured
- Redshirt

Roster
Last update: 6 August 2026

== Game summaries ==
=== at No. 18 Penn State ===
Marshall Thundering Herd (0–0) at No. 18 Penn State Nittany Lions (0–0) – Game summary

Quarter	1	2	3	4	Total
Thundering Herd	0	0	0	0	0
No. 18 Nittany Lions	17	7	14	7	45

at Beaver Stadium • University Park, Pennsylvania

- Date: September 5
- Game time: 3:30 p.m.
- Game weather: 76 °F (24 °C) • Partly Sunny
- Game attendance: 108,489
- Referee: Mark Kluczynski
- TV announcers (FS1): Jack Kizer (play-by-play) and Mark Helfrich (analyst)

Game information

First quarter

- (12:26) PSU – Ryan Barker 38-yard field goal (Drive: 6 plays, 30 yards, 2:27; Penn State 3–0)
- (8:35) PSU – Koby Howard 42-yard pass from Rocco Becht, Ryan Barker kick (Drive: 4 plays, 62 yards, 2:00; Penn State 10–0)
- (4:49) PSU – Brett Eskildsen 25-yard pass from Rocco Becht, Ryan Barker kick (Drive: 6 plays, 66 yards, 2:27; Penn State 17–0)

Second quarter

- (1:18) PSU – Benjamin Brahmer 8-yard pass from Rocco Becht, Ryan Barker kick (Drive: 11 plays, 87 yards, 5:09; Penn State 24–0)

Third quarter

- (11:14) PSU – Zay Robinson 39-yard pass from Rocco Becht, Ryan Barker kick (Drive: 4 plays, 74 yards, 1:52; Penn State 31–0)
- (6:16) PSU – Quinton Martin Jr. 6-yard run, Ryan Barker kick (Drive: 6 plays, 54 yards, 2:39; Penn State 38–0)

Fourth quarter

- (7:59) PSU – Cam Wallace 6-yard run, Ryan Barker kick (Drive: 6 plays, 30 yards, 3:18; Penn State 45–0)

Statistics	MRSH	PSU
First downs	11	25
Plays–yards	54–147	72–487
Rushes–yards	26–44	45–163
Passing yards	103	324
Passing: comp–att–int	19–28–1	20–27–0
Turnovers	2	0
Time of possession	23:47	36:13

Team	Category	Player	Statistics
Marshall	Passing	Carlos Del Rio-Wilson	17/25, 102 yards
Marshall	Rushing	Carlos Del Rio-Wilson	13 carries, 30 yards
Marshall	Receiving	Toby Payne	8 receptions, 55 yards
Penn State	Passing	Rocco Becht	13/18, 271 yards, 4 TD
Penn State	Rushing	Carson Hansen	11 carries, 48 yards
Penn State	Receiving	Koby Howard	6 receptions, 161 yards, TD

=== Middle Tennessee ===
Middle Tennessee Blue Raiders (1–0) at Marshall Thundering Herd (0–1) – Game summary

Quarter	1	2	3	4	Total
Blue Raiders	7	6	7	6	26
Thundering Herd	7	7	0	14	28

at Joan C. Edwards Stadium • Huntington, West Virginia

- Date: September 12
- Game time: 7:00 p.m.
- Game weather: Sunny
- Game attendance: 25,662
- Referee: Reed Brotherton
- TV announcers (ESPN+): Keith Morehouse (play-by-play) and Mark Martin (analyst)

Game information

First quarter

- (10:36) MRSH – Xayvion Turner-Bradshaw 69 yard pass from Carlos Del Rio-Wilson, Jorge Diaz Nicolas kick (Drive: 4 plays, 84 yards, 1:30; Marshall 7–0)
- (9:08) MTSU – Kalen Woods 1 yard fumble recovery, Dominic Bourgeois kick (Tied 7–7)

Second quarter

- (14:54) MTSU – Dominic Bourgeois 52 yard field goal (Drive: 10 plays, 52 yards, 6:47; Middle Tennessee 10–7)
- (8:31) MRSH – Carlos Del Rio-Wilson 4 yard run, Jorge Diaz Nicolas kick (Drive: 11 plays, 75 yards, 6:22; Marshall 14–10)
- (3:50) MTSU – Dominic Bourgeois 35 yard field goal (Drive: 10 plays, 58 yards, 4:41; Marshall 14–13)

Third quarter

- (5:36) MTSU – Cam'ron Lacy 11 yard pass from Roman Gagliano, Dominic Bourgeois kick (Drive: 10 plays, 52 yards, 6:47; Middle Tennessee 20–14)

Fourth quarter

- (12:06) MRSH – Xayvion Turner-Bradshaw 0 yard run, Jorge Diaz Nicolas kick (Drive: 10 plays, 68 yards, 3:38; Marshall 21–20)
- (4:18) MRSH – TJ Lester 2 yard run, Jorge Diaz Nicolas kick (Drive: 1 play, 2 yards, 0:05; Marshall 28–20)
- (0:50) MTSU – AJ Jones 15 yard pass from Roman Gagliano, Roman Gagliano pass failed (Drive: 10 plays, 75 yards, 3:28; Marshall 28–26)

Statistics	MTSU	MRSH
First downs	22	19
Plays–yards	69–352	61–310
Rushes–yards	22–109	38–129
Passing yards	243	181
Passing: comp–att–int	25–47–1	15–23–0
Turnovers	1	1
Time of possession	32:46	27:14

Team	Category	Player	Statistics
Middle Tennessee	Passing	Roman Gagliano	25/47, 243 yards, 2 TD, INT
Middle Tennessee	Rushing	Roman Gagliano	8 carries, 58 yards
Middle Tennessee	Receiving	Cam'ron Lacy	9 receptions, 72 yards
Marshall	Passing	Carlos Del Rio-Wilson	7/8, 93 yards, TD
Marshall	Rushing	Carlos Del Río-Wilson	10 carries, 43 yards, TD
Marshall	Receiving	Xayvion Turner-Bradshaw	2 receptions, 79 yards, TD

=== at Missouri State ===
Marshall Thundering Herd (1–1) at Missouri State Bears (1–1) – Game summary

Quarter	1	2	3	4	Total
Thundering Herd	14	3	10	3	30
Bears	10	0	14	0	24

at Robert W. Plaster Stadium • Springfield, Missouri

- Date: September 19
- Game time: 6:30 p.m.
- Game weather: Sunny • Temperature: 95 °F (35 °C) • Wind: SW 11 mph
- Game attendance: 16,010
- Referee: Chris Brison
- TV announcers (CBSSN): Jason Knapp (play-by-play) and Emory Hunt (analyst)

Game information

First quarter

- (9:24) MRSH – TJ Lester 39 yard pass from Carlos Del Rio-Wilson, Jorge Diaz Nicolas kick (Drive: 7 plays, 80 yards, 3:17; Marshall 7–0)
- (5:45) MOST – Yousef Obeid 35 yard field goal (Drive: 10 plays, 67 yards, 3:39; Marshall 7–3)
- (2:25) MRSH – Jo'Shon Barbie 1 yard run, Jorge Diaz Nicolas kick (Drive: 7 plays, 60 yards, 3:14; Marshall 14–3)
- (0:12) MOST – Witt Edwards 38 yard pass from Skyler Locklear, Yousef Obeid kick (Drive: 6 plays, 75 yards, 2:13; Marshall 14–10)

Second quarter

- (8:14) MRSH – Jorge Diaz Nicolas 28 yard field goal (Drive: 13 plays, 65 yards, 6:51; Marshall 17–10)

Third quarter

- (13:36) MRSH – Carlos Del Rio-Wilson 6 yard run, Jorge Diaz Nicolas kick (Drive: 4 plays, 48 yards, 1:20; Marshall 24–10)
- (9:56) MOST – Jambres Dubar 1 yard run, Yousef Obeid kick (Drive: 8 plays, 75 yards, 3:40; Marshall 24–17)
- (5:40) MRSH – Jorge Diaz Nicolas 32 yard field goal (Drive: 10 plays, 46 yards, 4:10; Marshall 27–17)
- (2:06) MOST – Jeron Askren 25 yard pass from Skyler Locklear, Yousef Obeid kick (Drive: 9 plays, 75 yards, 3:34; Marshall 27–24)

Fourth quarter

- (10:20) MRSH – Jorge Diaz Nicolas 31 yard field goal (Drive: 13 plays, 64 yards, 6:40; Marshall 30–24)

Statistics	MRSH	MOST
First downs	25	24
Plays–yards	71–464	65–506
Rushes–yards	45–267	36–186
Passing yards	197	320
Passing: comp–att–int	17–26–0	20–29–1
Turnovers	1	1
Time of possession	34:29	25:31

Team	Category	Player	Statistics
Marshall	Passing	Carlos Del Rio-Wilson	16/25, 176 yards, TD
Marshall	Rushing	Jo'Shon Barbie	12 carries, 81 yards, TD
Marshall	Receiving	Xayvion Turner-Bradshaw	6 receptions, 73 yards
Missouri State	Passing	Skyler Locklear	19/28, 309 yards, 2 TD, INT
Missouri State	Rushing	Ramone Green Jr.	15 carries, 76 yards
Missouri State	Receiving	Isaiah Myers	7 receptions, 141 yards

=== Gardner–Webb (FCS) ===
Gardner–Webb Runnin' Bulldogs (1–3) at Marshall Thundering Herd (2–1) – Game summary

Quarter	1	2	3	4	Total
Runnin' Bulldogs (FCS)	14	7	7	7	35
Thundering Herd	10	17	0	9	36

at Joan C. Edwards Stadium • Huntington, West Virginia

- Date: September 26
- Game time: 3:30 p.m.
- Game weather: Sunny
- Game attendance: 25,710
- Referee: Jermey Parker
- TV announcers (ESPN+): Keith Morehouse (play-by-play), Mark Martin (analyst), and Ben Westfall (sideline)

Game information

First quarter

- (12:07) GWEB – Kory Jones 11 yard pass from Cole Pennington, Tyler Simpson kick (Drive: 6 plays, 75 yards, 2:53; Gardner–Webb 7–0)
- (8:59) MRSH – Xayvion Turner-Bradshaw 48 yard pass from Carlos Del Rio-Wilson, Jorge Diaz Nicolas kick (Drive: 6 plays, 72 yards, 3:01; Tied 7–7)
- (8:47) GWEB – Giovanni Adopte 75 yard pass from Cole Pennington, Tyler Simpson kick (Drive: 1 play, 75 yards, 0:12; Gardner–Webb 14–7)
- (6:49) MRSH – Jorge Diaz Nicolas 54 yard field goal (Drive: 6 plays, 36 yards, 1:51; Gardner–Webb 14–10)

Second quarter

- (8:18) MRSH – Jo'Shon Barbie 8 yard pass from Carlo Del Rio-Wilson, Jorge Diaz Nicolas kick (Drive: 11 plays, 91 yards, 6:42; Marshall 17–14)
- (5:24) GWEB – Ruben Tshilombo 36 yard fumble recovery, Tyler Simpson kick (Gardner–Webb 21–17)
- (1:56) MRSH – Jo'Shon Barbie 5 yard run, Jorge Diaz Nicolas kick (Drive: 9 plays, 59 yards, 3:28; Marshall 24–21)
- (0:00) MRSH – Jorge Diaz Nicolas 21 yard field goal (Drive: 4 plays, 15 yards, 0:36; Marshall 27–21)

Third quarter

- (3:11) GWEB – Kory Jones 25 yard pass from Cole Pennington, Tyler Simpson kick (Drive: 15 plays, 91 yards, 6:21; Gardner–Webb 28–27)

Fourth quarter

- (9:24) GWEB – Giovanni Adopte 44 yard pass from Cole Pennington, Tyler Simpson kick (Drive: 9 plays, 80 yards, 4:04; Gardner–Webb 35–27)
- (6:06) MRSH – Xayvion Turner-Bradshaw 34 yard pass from Carlos Del Rio-Wilson, Carlos Del Rio-Wilson run failed (Drive: 8 plays, 74 yards, 3:18; Gardner–Webb 35–33)
- (0:03) MRSH – Jorge Diaz Nicolas 32 yard field goal (Drive: 10 plays, 66 yards, 1:54; Marshall 36–35)

Statistics	GWEB	MRSH
First downs	19	27
Plays–yards	60–458	70–569
Rushes–yards	27–160	35–156
Passing yards	298	413
Passing: comp–att–int	22–33–0	27–40–1
Turnovers	1	2
Time of possession	26:47	33:13

Team	Category	Player	Statistics
Gardner–Webb	Passing	Cole Pennington	22/33, 298 yards, 4 TD
Gardner–Webb	Rushing	Christian Vann	14 carries, 99 yards
Gardner–Webb	Receiving	Giovanni Adopte	7 receptions, 179 yards, 2 TD
Marshall	Passing	Carlos Del Rio-Wilson	26/38, 386 yards, 3 TD, INT
Marshall	Rushing	Carlos Del Rio-Wilson	14 carries, 48 yards
Marshall	Receiving	Xayvion Turner-Bradshaw	7 receptions, 131 yards, 2 TD

=== at James Madison ===
Marshall Thundering Herd (3–1) at James Madison Dukes (4–0) – Game summary

Quarter	1	2	3	4	Total
Thundering Herd	7	7	3	0	17
Dukes	10	28	0	7	45

at Bridgeforth Stadium • Harrisonburg, Virginia

- Date: October 3
- Game time: 3:45 p.m.
- Game weather: Sunny
- Game attendance: 25,034
- Referee: Marty Adams
- TV announcers (ESPNU): Ted Emrich (play-by-play) and Fozzy Whittaker (analyst)

Game information

First quarter

- (6:35) MRSH – Xayvion Turner-Bradshaw 3 yard pass from Carlos Del Rio-Wilson, Jorge Diaz Nicolas kick (Drive: 14 plays, 89 yards, 6:16; Marshall 7–0)
- (5:40) JMU – Corey Scott 53 yard pass from Camden Coleman, Morgan Suarez kick (Drive: 3 plays, 55 yards, 0:46; Tied 7–7)
- (2:38) JMU – Morgan Suarez 22 yard field goal (Drive: 5 plays, 43 yards, 1:56; James Madison 10–7)

Second quarter

- (14:26) MRSH – TJ Lester 1 yard run, Jorge Diaz Nicolas kick (Drive: 8 plays, 76 yards, 3:07; Marshall 14–10)
- (11:52) JMU – Corey Scott 12 yard pass from Camden Coleman, Morgan Suarez kick (Drive: 6 plays, 81 yards, 2:29; James Madison 17–14)
- (9:46) JMU – George Pettaway 73 yard run, Morgan Suarez kick (Drive: 2 plays, 73 yards, 0:16; James Madison 24–14)
- (2:45) JMU – George Pettaway 33 yard run, Morgan Suarez kick (Drive: 9 plays, 80 yards, 2:44; James Madison 31–14)
- (0:26) JMU – Noah Grevious 20 yard pass from Camden Coleman, Morgan Suarez kick (Drive: 6 plays, 54 yards, 1:12; James Madison 38–14)

Third quarter

- (7:18) MRSH – Jorge Diaz Nicolas 27 yard field goal (Drive: 5 plays, 3 yards, 1:38; James Madison 38–17)

Fourth quarter

- (0:50) JMU – Nick Harmon 3 yard run, Morgan Suarez kick (Drive: 11 plays, 80 yards, 5:04; James Madison 45–17)

Statistics	MRSH	JMU
First downs	23	25
Plays–yards	81–444	67–573
Rushes–yards	30–135	35–310
Passing yards	309	263
Passing: comp–att–int	29–51–2	21–32–0
Turnovers	2	1
Time of possession	31:55	28:05

Team	Category	Player	Statistics
Marshall	Passing	Carlos Del Rio-Wilson	21/37, 221 yards, TD, INT
Marshall	Rushing	Jo'Shon Barbie	7 carries, 44 yards
Marshall	Receiving	Khalil Wilkins	2 receptions, 62 yards
James Madison	Passing	Camden Coleman	21/32, 263 yards, 3 TD
James Madison	Rushing	George Pettaway	14 carries, 206 yards, 2 TD
James Madison	Receiving	Corey Scott	5 receptions, 104 yards, 2 TD

=== Coastal Carolina ===
Coastal Carolina Chanticleers (1–4) at Marshall Thundering Herd (3–2) – Game summary

Quarter	1	2	3	4	Total
Chanticleers	3	10	14	0	27
Thundering Herd	0	0	7	14	21

at Joan C. Edwards Stadium • Huntington, West Virginia

- Date: October 10
- Game time: 7:00 p.m.
- Game weather: Sunny
- Game attendance: 23,029
- Referee: Brandon Kirkland
- TV announcers (ESPN+): Keith Morehouse (play-by-play), Mark Martin (analyst), and Ben Westfall (sideline)

Game information

First quarter

- (8:58) CCU – Nico Cavanillas Alti 26 yard field goal (Drive: 4 plays, 1 yard, 1:59; Coastal Carolina 3–0)

Second quarter

- (12:31) CCU – Karmello English 7 yard pass from Deuce Bailey, Mitch Weisenborn kick (Drive: 4 plays, 40 yards, 1:49; Coastal Carolina 10–0)
- (3:33) CCU – Nico Cavanillas Alti 40 yard field goal(Drive: 10 plays, 58 yards, 5:06; Coastal Carolina 13–0)

Third quarter

- (14:42) CCU – Dominic Lee-Knicely 70 yard run, Mitch Weisenborn kick (Drive: 1 play, 70 yards, 0:12; Coastal Carolina 20–0)
- (11:47) CCU – Jaden Allen-Hendrix 2 yard run, Mitch Weisenborn kick (Drive: 7 plays, 28 yards, 2:55; Coastal Carolina 27–0)
- (2:46) MRSH – Judah Price 50 yard run, Jorge Diaz Nicolas kick (Drive: 4 plays, 87 yards, 1:24; Coastal Carolina 27–7)

Fourth quarter

- (2:52) MRSH – Judah Price 9 yard pass from Zion Turner, Jorge Diaz Nicolas kick (Drive: 4 plays, 34 yards, 1:10; Coastal Carolina 27–14)
- (2:14) MRSH – Owen Sweeney 19 yard pass from Zion Turner, Jorge Diaz Nicolas kick (Drive: 3 plays, 50 yards, 0:34; Coastal Carolina 27–21)

Statistics	CCU	MRSH
First downs	16	25
Plays–yards	63–308	78–505
Rushes–yards	45–235	41–221
Passing yards	73	284
Passing: comp–att–int	8–18–1	21–37–3
Turnovers	1	6
Time of possession	30:51	29:09

Team	Category	Player	Statistics
Coastal Carolina	Passing	Deuce Bailey	8/18, 73 yards, INT
Coastal Carolina	Rushing	Dominic Lee-Knicely	25 carries, 169 yards, TD
Coastal Carolina	Receiving	Dominic Lee-Knicely	3 receptions, 42 yards
Marshall	Passing	Zion Turner	18/27, 219 yards, 2 TD
Marshall	Rushing	Judah Price	12 carries, 124 yards, TD
Marshall	Receiving	Adrian Norton	4 receptions, 77 yards

=== South Alabama ===
South Alabama Jaguars (4–2) at Marshall Thundering Herd (3–3) – Game summary

Quarter	1	2	3	4	Total
Jaguars	3	3	0	7	13
Thundering Herd	0	6	7	7	20

at Joan C. Edwards Stadium • Huntington, West Virginia

- Date: October 20
- Game time: 7:30 p.m.
- Game weather: Sunny
- Game attendance: 21,904
- Referee: Scott Broadway
- TV announcers (ESPN2): Clay Matvick (play-by-play) and Rocky Boiman (analyst)

Game information

First quarter

- (1:54) USA – Davis Little 29 yard field goal (Drive: 9 plays, 70 yards, 4:57; South Alabama 3–0)

Second quarter

- (11:49) MRSH – Jorge Diaz Nicolas 47 yard field goal (Drive: 12 plays, 46 yards, 5:05; Tied 3–3)
- (1:55) MRSH – Jorge Diaz Nicolas 48 yard field goal (Drive: 7 plays, 21 yards, 2:42; Marshall 6–3)
- (0:00) USA – Davis Little 42 yard field goal (Drive: 12 plays, 31 yards, 1:49; Tied 6–6)

Third quarter

- (3:25) MRSH – Zion Turner 3 yard run, Jorge Diaz Nicolas kick (Drive: 6 plays, 55 yards, 2:48; Marshall 13–6)

Fourth quarter

- (4:38) USA – PJ Martin 19 yard run, Davis Little kick (Drive: 13 plays, 80 yards, 6:00; Tied 13–13)
- (1:49) MRSH – Judah Price 5 yard run, Jorge Diaz Nicolas kick (Drive: 8 plays, 75 yards, 2:49; Marshall 20–13)

Statistics	USA	MRSH
First downs	19	20
Plays–yards	75–326	66–328
Rushes–yards	42–178	33–147
Passing yards	148	181
Passing: comp–att–int	12–33–1	21–33–0
Turnovers	1	0
Time of possession	30:38	29:22

Team	Category	Player	Statistics
South Alabama	Passing	Jared Hollis	12/33, 148 yards, INT
South Alabama	Rushing	Keenan Phillips	16 carries, 70 yards
South Alabama	Receiving	Brendan Jenkins	4 receptions, 75 yards
Marshall	Passing	Zion Turner	21/33, 181 yards
Marshall	Rushing	Khalil Wilkins	8 carries, 69 yards
Marshall	Receiving	Toby Payne	7 receptions, 69 yards

=== at Old Dominion ===
Marshall Thundering Herd (4–3) at Old Dominion Monarchs (2–6) – Game summary

Quarter	1	2	3	4	Total
Thundering Herd	17	10	3	6	36
Monarchs	7	3	7	6	23

at S.B. Ballard Stadium • Norfolk, Virginia

- Date: October 31
- Game time: 1:00 p.m.
- Game weather: Sunny • Temperature: 62 °F (17 °C) • Wind: W 11 mph
- Game attendance: 17,093
- Referee: Brandon Kirkland
- TV announcers (ESPN+): Scott Jackson (play-by-play) and Andy Mashaw (analyst)

Game information

First quarter

- (12:57) MRSH – TJ Lester 4 yard run, Jorge Diaz Nicolas kick (Drive: 4 plays, 26 yards, 1:37; Marshall 7–0)
- (6:50) MRSH – TJ Lester 49 yard run, Jorge Diaz Nicolas kick (Drive: 1 play, 49 yards, 0:08; Marshall 14–0)
- (4:19) ODU – Maurki James 6 yard run, Andrew Nelms kick (Drive: 5 plays, 77 yards, 2:23; Marshall 14–7)
- (1:27) MRSH – Jorge Diaz Nicolas 35 yard field goal (Drive: 7 plays, 52 yards, 2:47; Marshall 17–7)

Second quarter

- (10:53) ODU – Andrew Nelms 21 yard field goal (Drive: 8 plays, 64 yards, 3:48; Marshall 17–10)
- (1:13) MRSH – Jorge Diaz Nicolas 30 yard field goal (Drive: 12 plays, 78 yards, 4:27; Marshall 20–10)
- (0:00) MRSH – Xayvion Turner-Bradshaw 100 yard field goal return, Jorge Diaz Nicolas kick (Marshall 27–10)

Third quarter

- (13:03) ODU – Brandon Crutchfield 44 yard interception, Andrew Nelms kick (Marshall 27–17)
- (7:15) MRSH – Jorge Diaz Nicolas 34 yard field goal (Drive: 5 plays, 15 yards, 2:20; Marshall 30–17)

Fourth quarter

- (12:34) MRSH – Jorge Diaz Nicolas 30 yard field goal (Drive: 13 plays, 68 yards, 6:33; Marshall 33–17)
- (5:52) MRSH – Jorge Diaz Nicolas 24 yard field goal (Drive: 4 plays, 6 yards, 2:13; Marshall 36–17)
- (3:54) ODU – Maurki James 14 yard run, Jaxon Potter pass failed (Drive: 7 plays, 55 yards, 1:50; Marshall 36–23)

Statistics	MRSH	ODU
First downs	17	20
Plays–yards	72–338	74–409
Rushes–yards	54–196	29–80
Passing yards	142	329
Passing: comp–att–int	8–18–1	23–45–3
Turnovers	1	4
Time of possession	35:12	24:48

Team	Category	Player	Statistics
Marshall	Passing	Carlos Del Rio-Wilson	3/9, 66 yards
Marshall	Rushing	Judah Price	15 carries, 82 yards
Marshall	Receiving	Chris Culliver	2 receptions, 67 yards
Old Dominion	Passing	Jaxon Potter	23/44, 329 yards, 3 INT
Old Dominion	Rushing	Trey Hall	8 carries, 41 yards
Old Dominion	Receiving	Josh Rodriguez	9 receptions, 143 yards

=== at Georgia Southern ===
Marshall Thundering Herd (5–3) at Georgia Southern Eagles (4–4) – Game summary

Quarter	1	2	3	4	Total
Thundering Herd	7	0	0	6	13
Eagles	14	7	14	14	49

at Paulson Stadium • Statesboro, Georgia

- Date: November 7
- Game time: 3:30 p.m.
- Game weather: Sunny • Temperature: 75 °F (24 °C) • Wind: S 4 mph
- Game attendance: 24,023
- Referee: Jeremy Parker
- TV announcers (ESPN+): Danny Waugh (play-by-play), Jayson Foster (analyst), and Capers Childs (sideline reporter)

Game information

First quarter

- (3:11) GASO – Jeremiah Ware 23 yard pass from Max Johnson, Tripp Bryant kick (Drive: 6 plays, 49 yards, 2:40; Georgia Southern 7–0)
- (3:04) GASO – Chace Callicut 24 yard interception, Tripp Bryant kick (Georgia Southern 14–0)
- (2:08) MRSH – Jo'Shon Barbie 45 yard run, Jorge Diaz Nicolas kick (Drive: 3 plays, 75 yards, 0:56; Georgia Southern 14–7)

Second quarter

- (5:11) GASO – Alex Taylor 70 yard pass from Max Johnson, Tripp Bryant kick (Drive: 1 play, 70 yards, 0:10; Georgia Southern 21–7)

Third quarter

- (8:31) GASO – Andre Greene Jr. 1 yard pass from Max Johnson, Tripp Bryant kick (Drive: 7 plays, 52 yards, 3:47; Georgia Southern 28–7)
- (1:35) GASO – Jeremiah Ware 45 yard pass from Max Johnson, Tripp Bryant kick (Drive: 8 plays, 91 yards, 4:37; Georgia Southern 35–7)

Fourth quarter

- (14:52) GASO – Max Johnson 16 yard run, Tripp Bryant kick (Drive: 3 plays, 28 yards, 0:55; Georgia Southern 42–7)
- (9:12) GASO – Ty Cummings 16 yard run, Tripp Bryant kick (Drive: 8 plays, 60 yards, 3:42; Georgia Southern 49–7)
- (7:04) MRSH – Khalil Wilkins 66 yard run, run failed (Drive: 4 plays, 84 yards, 2:03; Georgia Southern 49–13)

Statistics	MRSH	GASO
First downs	21	21
Plays–yards	68–412	63–454
Rushes–yards	39–250	33–167
Passing yards	162	287
Passing: comp–att–int	13–29–2	21–30–0
Turnovers	2	0
Time of possession	29:05	30:55

Team	Category	Player	Statistics
Marshall	Passing	Zion Turner	11/26, 141 yards, 2 INT
Marshall	Rushing	Jo'Shon Barbie	12 carries, 83 yards, TD
Marshall	Receiving	Owen Sweeney	4 receptions, 46 yards
Georgia Southern	Passing	Max Johnson	19/26, 271 yards, 4 TD
Georgia Southern	Rushing	Tyrese Woodgett	6 carries, 41 yards
Georgia Southern	Receiving	Jeremiah Ware	5 receptions, 94 yards, 2 TD

=== Appalachian State (The Old Mountain Feud) ===
Appalachian State Mountaineers (5–4) at Marshall Thundering Herd (5–4) – Game summary

Quarter	1	2	3	4	Total
Mountaineers	0	0	0	0	0
Thundering Herd	0	0	0	0	0

at Joan C. Edwards Stadium • Huntington, West Virginia

- Date: November 14

Game information

First quarter
Second quarter
Third quarter
Fourth quarter

Statistics	APP	MRSH
First downs		
Plays–yards		
Rushes–yards		
Passing yards		
Passing: comp–att–int		
Time of possession		

Team	Category	Player	Statistics
Appalachian State	Passing		
Appalachian State	Rushing		
Appalachian State	Receiving		
Marshall	Passing		
Marshall	Rushing		
Marshall	Receiving		

=== Georgia State ===
Georgia State Panthers (5–5) at Marshall Thundering Herd (5–5) – Game summary

Quarter	1	2	3	4	Total
Panthers	14	7	0	6	27
Thundering Herd	0	13	0	15	28

at Joan C. Edwards Stadium • Huntington, West Virginia

- Date: November 21
- Game time: 4:00 p.m.
- Game weather: Sunny
- Game attendance: 24,560
- Referee: Brandon Kirkland
- TV announcers (ESPN+): Keith Morehouse (play-by-play), Mark Martin (analyst), and Ben Westfall (sideline)

Game information

First quarter

- (8:09) GAST – Grant Hollier 4 yard pass from Ayden Pereira, Samer Layous kick (Drive: 10 plays, 78 yards, 4:43; Georgia State 7–0)
- (5:50) GAST – Derrick Avery Jr. 55 yard pass from Ayden Pereira, Samer Layous kick (Drive: 1 play, 55 yards, 0:08; Georgia State 14–0)

Second quarter

- (13:01) MRSH – Xayvion Turner-Bradshaw 21 yard pass from Carlos Del Rio-Wilson, Jorge Diaz Nicolas kick (Drive: 5 plays, 35 yards, 2:41; Georgia State 14–7)
- (9:42) MRSH – Chris Culliver 94 yard pass from Carlos Del Rio-Wilson, Jorge Diaz Nicolas kick blocked (Drive: 2 plays, 90 yards, 0:53; Georgia State 14–13)
- (2:34) GAST – Lanear McCrary Jr. 4 yard run, Samer Layous kick (Drive: 13 plays, 75 yards, 7:08; Georgia State 21–13)

Third quarter
No scoring plays
Fourth quarter

- (10:03) MRSH – Toby Payne 5 yard pass from Carlos Del Rio-Wilson, Owen Sweeney pass to Carlos Del Rio-Wilson (Drive: 11 plays, 84 yards, 6:11; Tied 21–21)
- (6:30) MRSH – Carlos Del Rio-Wilson 2 yard run, Jorge Diaz Nicolas kick (Drive: 5 plays, 57 yards, 1:55; Marshall 28–21)
- (0:02) GAST – Rodshaun Dorsey 31 yard pass from Ayden Pereira, Samer Layous kick failed (Drive: 6 plays, 76 yards, 0:41; Marshall 28–27)

Statistics	GAST	MRSH
First downs	22	16
Plays–yards	73–458	59–351
Rushes–yards	43–209	36–152
Passing yards	249	199
Passing: comp–att–int	16–30–1	12–23–0
Turnovers	1	0
Time of possession	33:58	26:02

Team	Category	Player	Statistics
Georgia State	Passing	Ayden Pereira	16/29, 249 yards, 3 TD, INT
Georgia State	Rushing	Qwantavius Wiggins	13 carries, 114 yards
Georgia State	Receiving	Rodshaun Dorsey	6 receptions, 61 yards, TD
Marshall	Passing	Carlos Del Rio-Wilson	12/23, 199 yards, 3 TD
Marshall	Rushing	Judah Price	8 carries, 48 yards
Marshall	Receiving	Chris Culliver	1 reception, 94 yards, TD

=== at Louisiana–Monroe ===
Marshall Thundering Herd (6–5) at Louisiana–Monroe Warhawks (2–9) – Game summary

Quarter	1	2	3	4	Total
Thundering Herd	0	0	0	0	0
Warhawks	0	0	0	0	0

at Malone Stadium • Monroe, Louisiana

- Date: November 28
- Game time: 1:00 p.m.
- TV: ESPN+

Game information

First quarter
Second quarter
Third quarter
Fourth quarter

Statistics	MRSH	ULM
First downs		
Plays–yards		
Rushes–yards		
Passing yards		
Passing: comp–att–int		
Time of possession		

Team	Category	Player	Statistics
Marshall	Passing		
Marshall	Rushing		
Marshall	Receiving		
Louisiana–Monroe	Passing		
Louisiana–Monroe	Rushing		
Louisiana–Monroe	Receiving		
