= Bowling Green High School (Kentucky) =

Secondary school in Kentucky

Coordinates: 36.9644°N 86.4420°W

Location
- 1801 Rockingham Lane; Bowling Green, (Warren County), Kentucky 42104; United States

Information
- Type: Public high school
- School district: Bowling Green Independent Schools
- Principal: Kyle McGraw
- Staff: 79.17 (FTE)
- Enrollment: 1,290 (2023-2024)
- Student to teacher ratio: 16.29
- Colors: Purple and old gold
- Nickname: Purples
- Website: https://bghs.bgreen.kyschools.us/o/bghs

Bowling Green High School is a public high school in Bowling Green, Kentucky, United States. It is a part of the Bowling Green Independent School District. The school's teams are called the purples and the school's colors are purple, gold, and white.

== History ==
Both Bowling Green High School and Louisville Male, another high school located in Louisville, Kentucky, were seeking the same education objectives. In aftermath, both schools agreed to work in unison and have the same school colors, the “purples” mascot, and the “H” to symbolize their schools. Louisville Male would later go on to change their mascot to the "bulldogs", but Bowling Green High School remained the purples.

The school has recently started upgrading with a renovation project that began in May 2018 with a groundbreaking. Phase I was completed in 2020. Phase I included the construction of 80% of the classrooms of the current facility, with 90,000 square feet (8,400 m^{2}) built. In 2020 the Bowling Green Independent School District Finance Corp. issued $17 million bonds for the second phase of renovations to ensure a source of funding for them. In June 2020 the second phase was to begin. The new building was to be built around the original swimming pool, which was to be demolished in Phase II and replaced with another pool. The former pool was called the "Dome of Champions", and it closed on March 15, 2021. In October 2021 the current swimming pool is to open. In 2021 the district proceeded with the fourth phase, and the remainder of the former facility is to be razed. The students and staff expect to be completely in the new building by the Spring of 2022.

== Notable alumni ==
- Deuce Bailey, college football quarterback for the Coastal Carolina Chanticleers
- Robert Reynolds, Retired NFL football player
- Patrick Forbes (baseball) Kentucky Mr. Baseball and 1st Round pick in 2025 MLB draft by Arizona
- Terry Taylor, Current NBA basketball player for the Chicago Bulls
- Kevin Willard, head men's basketball coach at Villanova University
