= 2026 Georgia Southern Eagles football team =

American college football season

2026 Georgia Southern Eagles football
- Conference: Sun Belt Conference
- East Division
- Record: 7–4 (6–1 Sun Belt)
- Head coach: Clay Helton (5th season)
- Offensive coordinator: Ryan Aplin (3rd season)
- Defensive coordinator: Mike Mutz (1st season)
- Home stadium: Paulson Stadium

2026 Sun Belt Conference football standings
	Conf.			Overall
Team	W		L	W		L
East Division
Georgia Southern	6	–	1	7	–	4
James Madison	5	–	2	8	–	3
Appalachian State	4	–	3	7	–	4
Coastal Carolina	3	–	4	4	–	7
Marshall	3	–	4	6	–	5
Georgia State	2	–	5	5	–	6
Old Dominion	2	–	5	3	–	8
West Division
Louisiana Tech xy	7	–	0	9	–	2
Louisiana	5	–	2	8	–	3
South Alabama	4	–	3	6	–	5
Arkansas State	2	–	5	4	–	7
Troy	2	–	5	4	–	7
Southern Miss	2	–	5	3	–	8
Louisiana–Monroe	2	–	5	2	–	9
Championship: TBD vs. Louisiana Tech
$ – Conference champion; x – Division champion/co-champions; y – Championship game participant; As of November 22, 2026; Rankings from AP poll

The 2026 Georgia Southern Eagles football team represent Georgia Southern University in the Sun Belt Conference's East Division during the 2026 NCAA Division I FBS football season. The Eagles are led by Clay Helton in his fifth year as the head coach. The Eagles play their home games at Paulson Stadium, which is located in Statesboro, Georgia.

== Offseason ==
=== 2026 NFL draft ===
The Eagles did not have any players selected in the NFL Draft, though several received invitations to NFL rookie mini-camps following the draft. Wide receivers Camden Brown and Marcus Sanders Jr. signed with the Dallas Cowboys and Minnesota Vikings as undrafted free agents.

=== Transfers ===
==== Incoming ====
Player	Position	Previous school
Diego Aviles	ILB	Wingate
O'Marion Brown	DL	Wofford
Anthony Bynum	OLB	Middle Tennessee
Mo Clipper Jr.	OL	Charlotte
Festus Davies	OLB	West Georgia
Greg Delaine	DB	Syracuse
Blake Ford	K	North Texas
Chason Glenn	LS	Georgia Military
Andre Greene Jr.	WR	Virginia
Ashton Hollins	WR	Illinois
Max Johnson	QB	North Carolina
Noble Johnson	WR	Arizona State
Jakyri Jones	DB	Southeastern Louisiana
Cam King	WR	Auburn
Noah Mangham	DB	Abilene Christian
Aidan McCowan	DB	Nicholls
Kam Mikell	WR	Colorado
Rashon Myles Jr.	ILB	Abilene Christian
Cole Norred	OL	East Tennessee State
King Phillips	WR	Texas A&M–Kingsville
Josh Raymond	OL	Florida State
Aaron Sears	DB	Stephen F. Austin
Alex Taylor	WR	North Carolina
Tyrese Woodgett	RB	Georgia Military

== Schedule ==
Date	Time	Opponent	Site	TV	Result	Attendance
September 5	7:00 p.m.	Charleston Southern*	Paulson Stadium; Statesboro, GA	ESPN+	W 31–0	22,426
September 12	9:30 p.m. (Note: Start time delayed from 7:30 p.m. due to thunderstorms.)	at Clemson*	Memorial Stadium; Clemson, SC	ACCN	L 7–22	81,150
September 19	7:00 p.m.	at Jacksonville State*	AmFirst Stadium; Jacksonville, AL	ESPN+	L 27–31	16,142
September 26	4:00 p.m.	No. 25 Houston*	Paulson Stadium; Statesboro, GA	ESPNU	L 28–42	24,112
October 3	7:00 p.m.	at Coastal Carolina	Brooks Stadium; Conway, SC	ESPN+	W 31–24	20,576
October 10	7:30 p.m.	James Madison	Paulson Stadium; Statesboro, GA	ESPNU	L 24–27	20,545
October 15	7:30 p.m.	at Old Dominion	S.B. Ballard Stadium; Norfolk, VA	ESPN2	W 23–15	17,912
October 31	6:30 p.m.	Appalachian State	Paulson Stadium; Statesboro, GA (Deeper Than Hate)	ESPN+	W 19–3	22,832
November 7	3:30 p.m.	Marshall^{†}	Paulson Stadium; Statesboro, GA	ESPN+	W 49–13	24,023
November 14	3:30 p.m.	at Georgia State	Center Parc Stadium; Atlanta, GA (Modern Day Hate)	ESPN+	W 34–17	19,452
November 21	4:00 p.m.	at Troy	Veterans Memorial Stadium; Troy, AL	ESPN+	W 45–7	18,977
November 28	12:00 p.m.	Louisiana Tech	Paulson Stadium; Statesboro, GA	ESPNU		
*Non-conference game; ^{†}Homecoming; Rankings from AP Poll (and CFP Rankings, after November 3) – Released prior to game; All times are in Eastern time

== Game summaries ==
=== Charleston Southern (FCS) ===
Charleston Southern Buccaneers (0–1) at Georgia Southern Eagles (0–0) – Game summary

Quarter	1	2	3	4	Total
Buccaneers (FCS)	0	0	0	0	0
Eagles	21	3	7	0	31

at Paulson Stadium • Statesboro, Georgia

- Date: September 5
- Game time: 7:00 p.m. EDT
- Game weather: Sunny • Temperature: 93 °F (34 °C) • Wind: W at 5 miles per hour (8.0 km/h)
- Game attendance: 22,426
- Referee: Marty Adams
- TV announcers (ESPN+): Danny Waugh (play-by-play), Jayson Foster (analyst), and Capers Childs (sideline reporter)

Game information

First quarter

- (8:51) GASO – Jamarian Samuel 7-yard run, Tripp Bryant kick (Drive: 14 plays, 75 yards, 6:09; GASO 7–0)
- (6:58) GASO – Ashton Hollins 57-yard pass from Max Johnson, Tripp Bryant kick (Drive: 1 play, 57 yards, 0:09; GASO 14–0)
- (0:16) GASO – Weston Bryan 1-yard run, Tripp Bryant kick (Drive: 11 plays, 69 yards, 5:10; GASO 21–0)

Second quarter

- (0:19) GASO – Tripp Bryant 32-yard field goal (Drive: 8 plays, 36 yards, 0:52; GASO 24–0)

Third quarter

- (7:17) GASO – Ty Cummings 18-yard run, Tripp Bryant kick (Drive: 9 plays, 90 yards, 4:28; GASO 31–0)

Fourth quarter

- No scoring plays.

Statistics	CHSO	GASO
First downs	10	26
Plays–yards	60–117	77–513
Rushes–yards	31–8	30–162
Passing yards	109	351
Passing: comp–att–int	9–29–1	33–47–1
Turnovers	2	1
Time of possession	24:04	35:56

Team	Category	Player	Statistics
Charleston Southern	Passing	Lek Powell	4/15, 35 yards
Charleston Southern	Rushing	Dwayne Wright	6 carries, 14 yards
Charleston Southern	Receiving	KD Dorsey	1 reception, 28 yards
Georgia Southern	Passing	Max Johnson	28/39, 281 yards, TD
Georgia Southern	Rushing	Jamarian Samuel	4 carries, 46 yards
Georgia Southern	Receiving	Ashton Hollins	8 receptions, 106 yards, TD

=== at Clemson ===
Georgia Southern Eagles (1–0) at Clemson Tigers (0–1) – Game summary

Quarter	1	2	3	4	Total
Eagles	0	7	0	0	7
Tigers	7	9	0	6	22

at Memorial Stadium • Clemson, South Carolina

- Date: September 12
- Game time: 7:30 p.m. EDT
- Game weather: Cloudy • Temperature: 75 °F (24 °C) • Wind: SW at 2 miles per hour (3.2 km/h)
- Game attendance: 81,150
- Referee: Darryl DeBerry
- TV announcers (ACCN): Wes Durham (play-by-play), Max Browne (analyst) and Madison Fitzpatrick (sideline reporter)

Game information

First quarter

- (11:01) CLEM – T. J. Moore 10-yard pass from Christopher Vizzina, Nolan Hauser kick (Drive: 7 plays, 27 yards, 2:25; CLEM 7–0)

Second quarter

- (14:57) CLEM – Nolan Hauser 20-yard field goal (Drive: 6 plays, 15 yards, 2:46; CLEM 10–0)
- (4:54) CLEM – Nolan Hauser 34-yard field goal (Drive: 6 plays, 47 yards, 2:23; CLEM 13–0)
- (3:03) GASO – Ashton Hollins 42-yard pass from Max Johnson, Tripp Bryant kick (Drive: 6 plays, 75 yards, 1:51; CLEM 13–7)
- (0:00) CLEM – Nolan Hauser 38-yard field goal (Drive: 11 plays, 55 yards, 3:03; CLEM 16–7)

Fourth quarter

- (6:26) CLEM – Nolan Hauser 50-yard field goal (Drive: 7 plays, 33 yards, 3:19; CLEM 19–7)
- (3:10) CLEM – Nolan Hauser 49-yard field goal (Drive: 4 plays, 0 yards, 1:30; CLEM 22–7)

Statistics	GASO	CLEM
First downs	14	22
Plays–yards	66–266	74–347
Rushes–yards	18–22	39–150
Passing yards	244	197
Passing: comp–att–int	27–48–0	20–35–1
Turnovers	1	2
Time of possession	28:18	31:42

Team	Category	Player	Statistics
Georgia Southern	Passing	Max Johnson	27/47, 244 yards, TD
Georgia Southern	Rushing	David Mbadinga	3 carries, 11 yards
Georgia Southern	Receiving	Ashton Hollins	5 receptions, 97 yards, TD
Clemson	Passing	Tait Reynolds	16/27, 178 yards
Clemson	Rushing	Gideon Davidson	14 carries, 62 yards
Clemson	Receiving	T. J. Moore	7 receptions, 103 yards, TD

=== at Jacksonville State ===
Georgia Southern Eagles (1–1) at Jacksonville State Gamecocks (1–2) – Game summary

Quarter	1	2	3	4	Total
Eagles	3	21	3	0	27
Gamecocks	0	10	7	14	31

at AmFirst Stadium • Jacksonville, Alabama

- Date: September 19
- Game time: 7:00 p.m. EDT
- Game weather: Sunny • Temperature: 92 °F (33 °C) • Wind: N at 5 mph
- Game attendance: 16,142
- Referee: Rodney Burnette
- TV announcers (ESPN+): Eli Gold (play-by-play), Jeff Burger (analyst), and Erica Schoeman (sideline reporter)

Game information

First quarter

- (7:08) GASO – Tripp Bryant 22-yard field goal (Drive: 14 plays, 71 yards, 7:52; GASO 3–0)

Second quarter

- (12:30) GASO – Weston Bryan 10-yard run, Tripp Bryant kick (Drive: 7 plays, 50 yards, 2:23; GASO 10–0)
- (9:50) GASO – Weston Bryan 2-yard run, Tripp Bryant kick (Drive: 6 plays, 22 yards, 2:26; GASO 17–0)
- (7:09) JVST – Jalen Likely 13-yard pass from Caden Creel, Garrison Rippa kick (Drive: 5 plays, 75 yards, 2:41; GASO 17–7)
- (2:07) JVST – Garrison Rippa 35-yard field goal (Drive: 7 plays, 75 yards, 2:56; GASO 17–10)
- (0:32) GASO – Weston Bryan 2-yard run, Tripp Bryant kick (Drive: 7 plays, 75 yards, 1:32; GASO 24–10)

Third quarter

- (7:45) JVST – Deondre Johnson 18-yard pass from Caden Creel, Garrison Rippa kick (Drive: 13 plays, 75 yards, 7:15; GASO 24–17)
- (2:06) GASO – Tripp Bryant 43-yard field goal (Drive: 10 plays, 61 yards, 5:33; GASO 27–17)

Fourth quarter

- (11:17) JVST – Lucas Farrington 26-yard run, Garrison Rippa kick (Drive: 4 plays, 53 yards, 1:33; GASO 27–24)
- (8:16) JVST – Caleb Nix 75-yard punt return, Garrison Rippa kick (Drive: 5 plays, 13 yards, 3:01; JVST 31–27)

Statistics	GASO	JVST
First downs	22	17
Plays–yards	72-369	49-302
Rushes–yards	39-182	25-108
Passing yards	187	194
Passing: comp–att–int	23-33-1	17-24-0
Turnovers	1	1
Time of possession	36:23	23:37

Team	Category	Player	Statistics
Georgia Southern	Passing	Max Johnson	23/33, 187 yards, INT
Georgia Southern	Rushing	David Mbadinga	18 carries, 103 yards
Georgia Southern	Receiving	Josh Dallas	7 receptions, 43 yards
Jacksonville State	Passing	Caden Creel	17/24, 194 yards, 2 TDs
Jacksonville State	Rushing	Lucas Farrington	4 carries, 44 yards, TD
Jacksonville State	Receiving	Deondre Johnson	3 receptions, 61 yards, TD

=== No. 25 Houston ===
No. 25 Houston Cougars (2–1) at Georgia Southern Eagles (1–2) – Game summary

Quarter	1	2	3	4	Total
No. 25 Cougars	14	14	7	7	42
Eagles	0	14	7	7	28

at Paulson Stadium • Statesboro, Georgia

- Date: September 26
- Game time: 4:00 p.m. EDT
- Game weather: Sunny • Temperature: 81 °F (27 °C) • Wind: S at 6 mph (9.7 km/h)
- Game attendance: 24,112
- Referee: Brandon Kirkland
- TV announcers (ESPNU): Courtney Lyle (play-by-play) and Rene Ingoglia (analyst)

Game information

First quarter

- HOU – Conner Weigman 5-yard run (Jonathan Dimas kick), 10:30. Cougars 7–0. Drive: 6 plays, 37 yards, 2:11.
- HOU – Koby Young 22-yard pass from Conner Weigman (Jonathan Dimas kick), 2:31. Cougars 14–0. Drive: 8 plays, 67 yards, 4:11.

Second quarter

- GASO – Alex Taylor 40-yard pass from Max Johnson (Tripp Bryant kick), 13:32. Cougars 14–7. Drive: 7 plays, 75 yards, 3:59.
- GASO – Ty Cummings 2-yard run (Tripp Bryant kick), 9:28. Tied 14–14. Drive: 8 plays, 54 yards, 4:01.
- HOU – Conner Weigman 1-yard run (Jonathan Dimas kick), 5:48. Cougars 21–14. Drive: 9 plays, 75 yards, 3:40.
- HOU – Traville Frederick Jr. 2-yard pass from Conner Weigman (Jonathan Dimas kick), 0:52. Cougars 28–14. Drive: 9 plays, 75 yards, 2:51.

Third quarter

- HOU – Trent Walker 23-yard pass from Conner Weigman (Jonathan Dimas kick), 11:25. Cougars 35–14. Drive: 8 plays, 73 yards, 3:30.
- GASO – Alex Taylor 23-yard pass from Max Johnson (Tripp Bryant kick), 6:34. Cougars 35–21. Drive: 9 plays, 76 yards, 4:45.

Fourth quarter

- HOU – Amare Thomas 11-yard pass from Conner Weigman (Jonathan Dimas kick), 14:10. Cougars 42–21. Drive: 14 plays, 86 yards, 7:20.
- GASO – River Helms 5-yard pass from Max Johnson (Tripp Bryant kick), 8:20. Cougars 42–28. Drive: 12 plays, 75 yards, 5:50.

Statistics	HOU	GASO
First downs	28	22
Plays–yards	63–441	65–355
Rushes–yards	41–202	26–66
Passing yards	239	289
Passing: comp–att–int	17–22–0	27–39–0
Time of possession	28:39	31:21

Team	Category	Player	Statistics
Houston	Passing	Conner Weigman	17/22, 239 yards, 4 TD
Houston	Rushing	Re'Shaun Sanford II	17 carries, 120 yards
Houston	Receiving	Trent Walker	6 receptions, 83 yards, TD
Georgia Southern	Passing	Max Johnson	26/38, 284 yards, 3 TD
Georgia Southern	Rushing	David Mbadinga	6 carries, 37 yards
Georgia Southern	Receiving	Alex Taylor	6 receptions, 119 yards, 2 TD

=== at Coastal Carolina ===
Georgia Southern Eagles (1–3) at Coastal Carolina Chanticleers (1–3) – Game summary

Quarter	1	2	3	4	Total
Eagles	0	0	0	0	0
Chanticleers	0	0	0	0	0

at Brooks Stadium • Conway, South Carolina

- Date: October 3
- Game time: 7:00 p.m. EDT
- Game attendance: 20,576
- TV: ESPN+

Game information

First Quarter

Second Quarter

Third Quarter

Fourth Quarter

Statistics	GASO	CCU
First downs		
Total yards		
Rushing yards		
Passing yards		
Passing: Comp–Att–Int		
Time of possession		

Team	Category	Player	Statistics
Georgia Southern	Passing		
Georgia Southern	Rushing		
Georgia Southern	Receiving		
Coastal Carolina	Passing		
Coastal Carolina	Rushing		
Coastal Carolina	Receiving		

=== James Madison ===
James Madison Dukes (5–0) at Georgia Southern Eagles (2–3) – Game summary

Quarter	1	2	3	4	Total
Dukes	0	0	0	0	0
Eagles	0	0	0	0	0

at Paulson Stadium • Statesboro, Georgia

- Date: October 10
- Game time: 7:30 p.m. EDT
- Game attendance: 20,545
- TV: ESPNU

Statistics	JMU	GASO
First downs		
Plays–yards		
Rushes–yards		
Passing yards		
Passing: comp–att–int		
Time of possession		

Team	Category	Player	Statistics
James Madison	Passing		
James Madison	Rushing		
James Madison	Receiving		
Georgia Southern	Passing		
Georgia Southern	Rushing		
Georgia Southern	Receiving		

=== at Old Dominion ===
Georgia Southern Eagles (2–4) at Old Dominion Monarchs (2–4) – Game summary

Quarter	1	2	3	4	Total
Eagles	0	0	0	0	0
Monarchs	0	0	0	0	0

at S.B. Ballard Stadium • Norfolk, Virginia

- Date: October 15
- Game time: 7:30 p.m.
- Game attendance: 17,912
- TV: ESPN2

Game information

First quarter
Second quarter
Third quarter
Fourth quarter

Statistics	GASO	ODU
First downs		
Plays–yards		
Rushes–yards		
Passing yards		
Passing: comp–att–int		
Turnovers		
Time of possession		

Team	Category	Player	Statistics
Georgia Southern	Passing		
Georgia Southern	Rushing		
Georgia Southern	Receiving		
Old Dominion	Passing		
Old Dominion	Rushing		
Old Dominion	Receiving		

=== Appalachian State (Deeper Than Hate) ===
Appalachian State Mountaineers (5–2) at Georgia Southern Eagles (3–4) – Game summary

Quarter	1	2	3	4	Total
Mountaineers	0	0	0	0	0
Eagles	0	0	0	0	0

at Paulson Stadium • Statesboro, Georgia

- Date: October 31
- Game time: 6:30 p.m. EDT
- Game attendance: 22,832
- TV: ESPN+

Game information

First quarter
Second quarter
Third quarter
Fourth quarter

Statistics	APP	GASO
First downs		
Plays–yards		
Rushes–yards		
Passing yards		
Passing: comp–att–int		
Time of possession		

Team	Category	Player	Statistics
Appalachian State	Passing		
Appalachian State	Rushing		
Appalachian State	Receiving		
Georgia Southern	Passing		
Georgia Southern	Rushing		
Georgia Southern	Receiving		

=== Marshall ===
Marshall Thundering Herd (5–3) at Georgia Southern Eagles (4–4) – Game summary

Quarter	1	2	3	4	Total
Thundering Herd	0	0	0	0	0
Eagles	0	0	0	0	0

at Paulson Stadium • Statesboro, Georgia

- Date: November 7
- Game time: 3:30 p.m. EDT
- Game attendance: 24,023
- TV: ESPN+

Game information

First quarter
Second quarter
Third quarter
Fourth quarter

Statistics	MRSH	GASO
First downs		
Plays–yards		
Rushes–yards		
Passing yards		
Passing: comp–att–int		
Time of possession		

Team	Category	Player	Statistics
Marshall	Passing		
Marshall	Rushing		
Marshall	Receiving		
Georgia Southern	Passing		
Georgia Southern	Rushing		
Georgia Southern	Receiving		

=== at Georgia State (Modern Day Hate) ===
Georgia Southern Eagles (5–4) at Georgia State Panthers (5–4) – Game summary

Quarter	1	2	3	4	Total
Eagles	0	0	0	0	0
Panthers	0	0	0	0	0

at Center Parc Stadium • Atlanta, Georgia

- Date: November 14
- Game time: 3:30 p.m. EDT
- Game attendance: 19,452
- TV: ESPN+

Game information

First quarter
Second quarter
Third quarter
Fourth quarter

Statistics	GASO	GAST
First downs		
Plays–yards		
Rushes–yards		
Passing yards		
Passing: comp–att–int		
Turnovers		
Time of possession		

Team	Category	Player	Statistics
Georgia Southern	Passing		
Georgia Southern	Rushing		
Georgia Southern	Receiving		
Georgia State	Passing		
Georgia State	Rushing		
Georgia State	Receiving		

=== at Troy ===
Georgia Southern Eagles (6–4) at Troy Trojans (4–6) – Game summary

Quarter	1	2	3	4	Total
Eagles	0	0	0	0	0
Trojans	0	0	0	0	0

at Veterans Memorial Stadium • Troy, Alabama

- Date: November 21
- Game time: 4:00 p.m. EDT
- TV: ESPN+

Game information

First quarter
Second quarter
Third quarter
Fourth quarter

Statistics	GASO	TROY
First downs		
Plays–yards		
Rushes–yards		
Passing yards		
Passing: comp–att–int		
Time of possession		

Team	Category	Player	Statistics
Georgia Southern	Passing		
Georgia Southern	Rushing		
Georgia Southern	Receiving		
Troy	Passing		
Troy	Rushing		
Troy	Receiving		

=== Louisiana Tech ===
Louisiana Tech Bulldogs (0–0) at Georgia Southern Eagles (0–0) – Game summary

Quarter	1	2	3	4	Total
Bulldogs	0	0	0	0	0
Eagles	0	0	0	0	0

at Paulson Stadium • Statesboro, Georgia

- Date: November 28
- Game time: 12:00 p.m. EDT
- TV: ESPNU

Statistics	LT	GASO
First downs		
Total yards		
Rushing yards		
Passing yards		
Turnovers		
Time of possession		

Team	Category	Player	Statistics
Louisiana Tech	Passing		
Louisiana Tech	Rushing		
Louisiana Tech	Receiving		
Georgia Southern	Passing		
Georgia Southern	Rushing		
Georgia Southern	Receiving		
