= Tony Gibson (American football) =

American football coach (born 1972)

Current position
- Title: Head coach
- Team: Marshall
- Conference: Sun Belt
- Record: 11–12
- Annual salary: $1 million

Biographical details
- Born: October 12, 1972 (age 54); Van, West Virginia, U.S.

Playing career
- 1991–1994: Glenville State
- Position: Defensive Back

Coaching career (HC unless noted)
- 1995: Gilmer County High School (WV)
- 1996: Glenville State (DB)
- 1997–1998: Cumberland (ST/DB)
- 1999–2000: West Virginia Tech (DC)
- 2001–2007: West Virginia (DB)
- 2008–2010: Michigan (AHC/ST/DB)
- 2011: Pittsburgh (PGC/S)
- 2012: Arizona (AHC/ST/S)
- 2013: West Virginia (S)
- 2014–2018: West Virginia (DC/LB)
- 2019: NC State (DC/S)
- 2020–2024: NC State (DC/LB)
- 2025–present: Marshall

Head coaching record
- Overall: 11–12

Tony Gibson (born October 12, 1972) is an American college football coach who is currently the head football coach at Marshall University. He previously served as defensive coordinator for West Virginia and NC State.

== College years ==
Gibson attended Glenville State from 1991 to 1994 where he played as a defensive back, winning two WVIAC championships.

== Coaching career ==
Gibson got his start in college coaching at his alma mater as a defensive backs coach. In 2001, he broke into the FBS ranks as the defensive backs coach at West Virginia, a job he would hold until 2007. In 2008, when West Virginia head coach Rich Rodriguez was hired to the same job at Michigan, he brought Gibson with him to serve as assistant head coach, special teams and defensive backs coach. Gibson, was fired from Michigan alongside Rodriguez following the 2010 season. He then had one year stints at Pitt and Arizona in a variety of roles before returning to West Virginia in 2013 as the safeties coach and was subsequently promoted to defensive coordinator in 2014. Following West Virginia head coach Dana Holgorsen's departure in 2019, new head coach Neal Brown chose not to keep Gibson as the team's defensive coordinator. In 2019, Gibson was hired as the defensive coordinator for NC State.

On December 8, 2024, it was announced that Gibson was hired as head coach at Marshall, replacing Charles Huff.

== Personal life ==
Gibson and his wife have two children.

== Head coaching record ==
| Year | Team | Overall | Conference | Standing | Bowl/playoffs |
|---|---|---|---|---|---|
Marshall Thundering Herd (Sun Belt Conference) (2025–present)
| 2025 | Marshall | 5–7 | 3–5 | 5th (East) | |
| 2026 | Marshall | 6–5 | 3–4 | (East) | |
| Marshall: | | 11–12 | 6–9 | | |
| Total: | | 11–12 | | | |
