= Joseph Jefferson (American football) =

American football player (born 1980)

No. 29
- Position: Cornerback

Personal information
- Born: February 15, 1980 (age 46); Russellville, Kentucky, U.S.

Career information
- High school: Logan County (Russellville)
- College: Western Kentucky
- NFL draft: 2002: 3rd round, 74th overall pick

Career history
- Indianapolis Colts (2002–2005)

Career NFL statistics
- Tackles: 49
- Interceptions: 1
- Stats at Pro Football Reference

Joseph Jerome Jefferson Jr. (born February 15, 1980) is an American former professional football player who was a cornerback in the National Football League (NFL). He was selected by the Indianapolis Colts in the third round of the 2002 NFL draft with the 74th overall pick.

== Career ==
Before playing for the NFL, Jefferson was a standout football and basketball player at Logan County High School in Russellville, Kentucky. He was hampered by injuries his entire NFL career. The most games he ever played in a season was 10, including two postseason appearances, in 2004. Injuries made him miss the entire 2003 season. Jefferson had 49 career tackles (38 solo, 11 assisted) and one interception. He also had one career kick return, which he returned 11 yards.

== Personal life ==
Jefferson's cousin is current Coastal Carolina quarterback, Deuce Bailey.
