= Khalil Wilkins =

American football player

No. 14 – Marshall Thundering Herd
- Position: Quarterback
- Class: (redshirt) Sophomore

Personal information
- Listed height: 6 ft 4 in (1.93 m)
- Listed weight: 203 lb (92 kg)

Career information
- High school: Riverdale Baptist (Upper Marlboro, Maryland)
- College: West Virginia (2024–2025); Marshall (2026–present)
- Stats at ESPN

Khalil Wilkins is an American college football quarterback for the Marshall Thundering Herd. He previously played for the West Virginia Mountaineers.

== Early life ==
Wilkins began his high school career at Roosevelt High School in Washington D.C., before transferring to Riverdale Baptist School in Upper Marlboro, Maryland for his senior year. As a senior, he threw for 1,100 yards and 15 touchdowns while also rushing for 330 yards and four touchdowns. A three-star recruit, he committed to play college football at West Virginia University.

== College career ==
Wilkins redshirted in 2024. Against Utah the following season, he threw for 63 yards and his first career touchdown. Following his performance, Wilkins was named the Mountaineers starting quarterback against BYU. In his first career start, he threw for 81 yards and two interceptions while also rushing for 89 yards and a touchdown in a 38–24 loss. Wilkins ended the season throwing for 185 yards and a touchdown, while also rushing for 243 yards and two touchdowns. He entered the transfer portal at the conclusion of the season.

On January 18, 2026, Wilkins announced his decision to transfer to Marshall University to play for the Marshall Thundering Herd.

=== Statistics ===
Season	Team	Games			Passing								Rushing				Receiving			
Season	Team	GP	GS	Record	Comp	Att	Pct	Yards	Avg	TD	Int	Rate	Att	Yards	Avg	TD	Rec	Yards	Avg	TD
2024	West Virginia	Redshirt (redshirt)																		
2025	West Virginia	6	1	0–1	16	36	44.4	185	5.1	1	2	85.7	58	243	4.2	2	—	—	—	—
2026	Marshall	10	1	0–1	8	16	50.0	116	7.3	0	0	111.3	44	323	7.3	1	6	99	16.5	0
Career		16	2	0−2	24	52	46.2	301	5.8	1	2	93.4	102	566	5.5	3	6	99	16.5	0
