= Deuce Bailey =

American football player (born 2007)

No. 2 – Coastal Carolina Chanticleers
- Position: Quarterback
- Class: Redshirt Freshman

Personal information
- Born: January 2, 2007 (age 19); Bowling Green, Kentucky, U.S.
- Listed height: 6 ft 1 in (1.85 m)
- Listed weight: 190 lb (86 kg)

Career information
- High school: Bowling Green (Bowling Green, Kentucky)
- College: Missouri State (2025); Coastal Carolina (2026–present)
- Stats at ESPN

Craig "Deuce" Bailey (born January 2, 2007) is an American college football quarterback for the Coastal Carolina Chanticleers. He previously played for the Missouri State Bears.

== Early life ==
Bailey attended Bowling Green High School in Bowling Green, Kentucky. He won the Kentucky Class 5A state championships in his junior and senior seasons and was named the championship game MVP both years. He passed for 3,517 yards with 43 touchdowns and eight rushing touchdowns his junior year and 3,183 yards with 45 touchdowns and 423 rushing yards and five rushing touchdowns his senior year. Bailey committed to Missouri State University to play college football.

== College career ==
Bailey was a backup to Jacob Clark at Missouri State in 2025. He appeared in three games and started one in place of Clark. In his first career start he completed 16 of 28 passes for 278 yards with one passing and one rushing touchdown. For the season he completed 23 of 47 passes for 335 yards and two passing touchdowns with 81 rushing yards and a touchdown. After Missouri State head coach Ryan Beard left for Coastal Carolina University, Bailey entered the transfer portal and followed his coach to Coastal Carolina. He opened the season as the starter and in his first game passed for 373 yards and three touchdowns.

== Personal life ==
Bailey's cousin is former Indianapolis Colts cornerback, Joseph Jefferson.
