= Jaxon Potter =

American football player

No. 2 – Old Dominion Monarchs
- Position: Quarterback
- Class: (redshirt) Junior

Personal information
- Listed height: 6 ft 5 in (1.96 m)
- Listed weight: 205 lb (93 kg)

Career information
- High school: Santa Margarita Catholic (Rancho Santa Margarita, California)
- College: Washington State (2023–2025); Old Dominion (2026–present)
- Stats at ESPN

Jaxon Potter is an American college football quarterback for the Old Dominion Monarchs. He previously played for the Washington State Cougars.

== Early life ==
Potter attended Santa Margarita Catholic High School in Rancho Santa Margarita, California. He was rated as a three-star recruit and the 78th overall quarterback in the class of 2023, and committed to play college football for the Washington State Cougars.

== College career ==
=== Washington State ===
As a freshman in 2023, Potter did not play in any games, taking a redshirt. In 2024, he completed both of his pass attempts for 26 yards versus Hawaii. Heading into the 2025 season, Potter competed for the starting job with Zevi Eckhaus, Ajani Sheppard, and Julian Duggar for the Cougars starting job, ultimately earning the team's starting position. During his first start Potter completed 24 of his 31 pass attempts for 209 yards and a touchdown, as he led his team on a game-winning drive versus Idaho.

On December 4, 2025, Potter announced that he would enter the transfer portal.

=== Old Dominion ===
On January 13, 2026, Potter announced that he would transfer to Old Dominion.

=== College statistics ===
Season	Team	Games			Passing								Rushing			
Season	Team	GP	GS	Record	Cmp	Att	Pct	Yds	Avg	TD	Int	Rtg	Att	Yds	Avg	TD
2023	Washington State	Redshirt (redshirt)														
2024	Washington State	2	0	—	2	2	100.0	26	13.0	0	0	209.2	0	0	0.0	0
2025	Washington State	3	3	2–1	67	95	70.5	604	6.4	4	3	131.5	5	8	1.6	0
Career		5	3	2–1	69	97	71.1	630	6.5	4	3	133.1	5	8	1.6	0
