= Carlos Del Rio-Wilson =

American football player (born 2002)

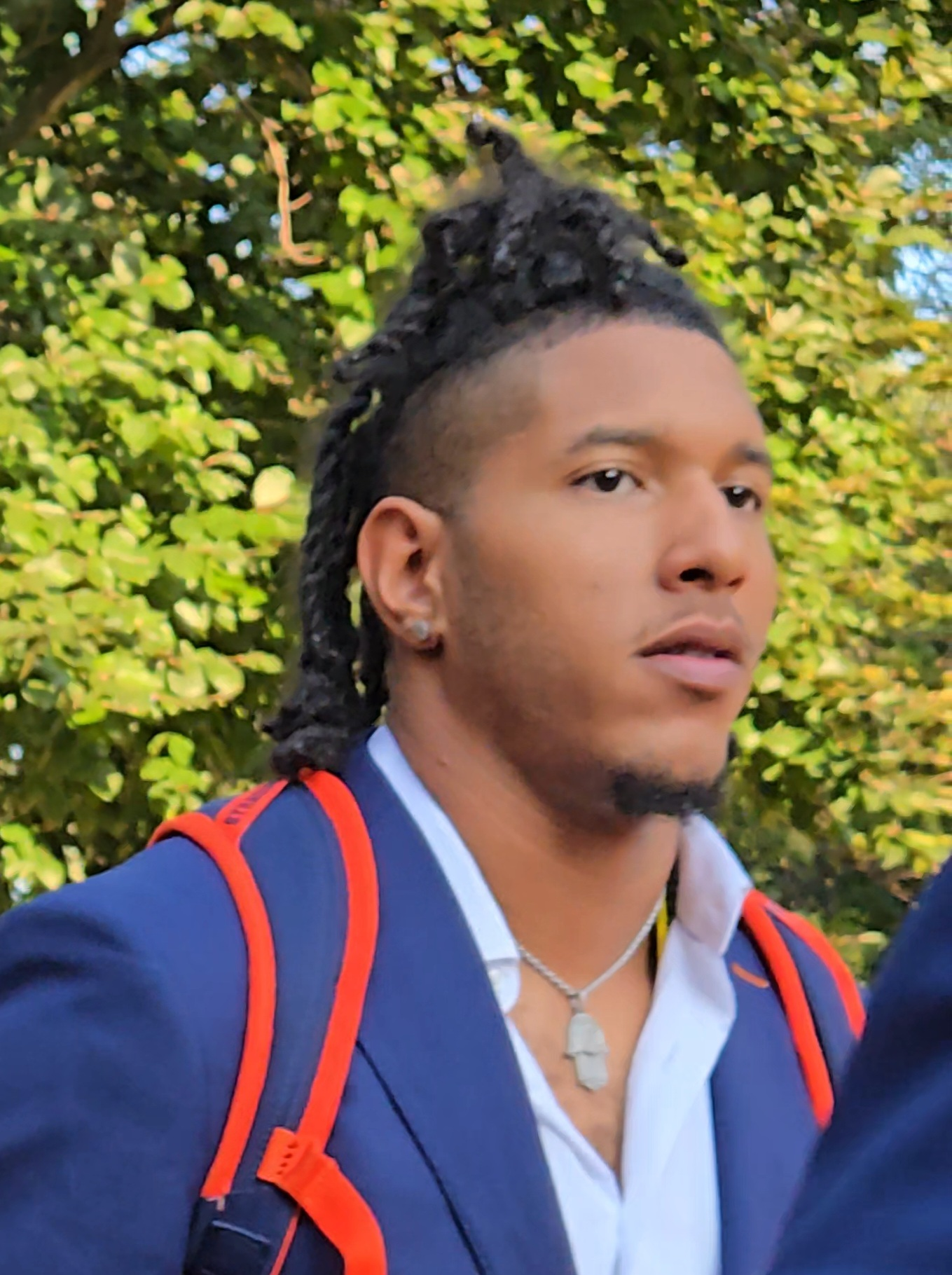
- Del Rio-Wilson with Syracuse in 2024

No. 7 – Marshall Thundering Herd
- Position: Quarterback
- Class: (redshirt) Senior

Personal information
- Born: September 24, 2002 (age 24); Atlanta, Georgia, U.S.
- Listed height: 6 ft 2 in (1.88 m)
- Listed weight: 234 lb (106 kg)

Career information
- High school: Cartersville (Cartersville, Georgia)
- College: Florida (2021); Syracuse (2022–2024); Marshall (2025–present)
- Stats at ESPN

Carlos Del Rio-Wilson (born September 24, 2002) is an American college football quarterback second string for the Marshall Thundering Herd. He previously played for the Florida Gators and Syracuse Orange.

== Early life ==
Del Rio-Wilson attended Cartersville High School in Cartersville, Georgia. As a senior, he threw for 1,599 yards and 14 touchdowns. A four-star recruit, Del Rio-Wilson committed to play college football at the University of Florida.

== College career ==
After redshirting in his lone season at Florida, Del Rio-Wilson transferred to Syracuse University. He received his first significant playing time against Notre Dame, in relief of injured starter Garrett Shrader, throwing for 190 yards, a touchdown, and an interception. The following week, he made his first career start against Pittsburgh. Del Rio-Wilson finished the 2022 season throwing for 342 yards, a touchdown, and two interceptions. After not playing during the 2024 season due to injury, he entered the transfer portal for a second time.

On January 12, 2025, Del Rio-Wilson announced his decision to transfer to Marshall University. After serving as the backup quarterback in the season opener against Georgia, he became the team's full-time starter against Eastern Kentucky. Against Middle Tennessee, Del Rio-Wilson threw for 261 yards and totaled five touchdowns in a 42–28 victory and being named Sun Belt Offensive Player of the Week for his efforts.

On December 15, 2025, it was reported that Del Rio-Wilson would return to the Herd in 2026.

=== Statistics ===
Season	Team	Games			Passing								Rushing			
Season	Team	GP	GS	Record	Cmp	Att	Pct	Yds	Avg	TD	Int	Rtg	Att	Yds	Avg	TD
2021	Florida	Redshirted (redshirt)														
2022	Syracuse	7	1	0–1	22	51	43.1	342	6.7	1	2	98.1	25	43	1.7	0
2023	Syracuse	7	1	0–1	26	51	51.0	282	5.5	3	6	93.3	21	105	5.0	1
2024	Syracuse	DNP														
2025	Marshall	11	10	5–5	171	256	66.8	2,043	8.0	17	5	151.8	160	660	4.1	6
2026	Marshall	9	7	4–3	117	194	60.3	1,412	7.3	9	5	131.6	97	321	3.3	3
Career		34	19	9−10	336	552	60.9	4,079	7.4	30	18	134.4	303	1,129	3.7	10
