= UTSA Roadrunners football statistical leaders =

The UTSA Roadrunners football statistical leaders are individual statistical leaders of the UTSA Roadrunners football program in various categories, including passing, rushing, receiving, total offense, defensive stats, kicking, and scoring. Within those areas, the lists identify single-game, single-season and career leaders. Since the 2023 season, the Roadrunners have represented the University of Texas at San Antonio in the NCAA Division I FBS American Conference.

UTSA began competing in intercollegiate football in 2011. Therefore, the Roadrunners do not have the typical issues with statistical leaderboards like these -- there is no era from the early 20th century in which complete records do not exist. On the other hand, players appearing on these lists often have relatively low statistic totals because the team has not yet existed long enough for many players to produce big numbers.

Recordkeeping notes:

- Since UTSA did not start football competition until 2011, it was not affected by the NCAA's practice of not counting statistics amassed in FBS bowl games, or playoff games in Division I FCS, toward official season statistics until 2002. UTSA did not qualify for the FCS playoffs in its first season in 2011, which was its only season of FCS playoff eligibility. In 2012, it began its transition to FBS, completing it in advance of the 2014 season. Since becoming eligible for bowl games in 2014, the Roadrunners have played in six bowl games, giving players in those seasons an extra game to amass statistics.
- Conference USA, in which UTSA was a member from 2013 to 2022, has held a championship game since 2005. UTSA played in (and won) the game in 2021 and 2022, giving players in those seasons yet another game to amass statistics. Similarly, the American has held a championship game since 2015, although UTSA has yet to qualify for that game.
- Due to COVID-19 issues, the NCAA ruled that the 2020 season would not count against the athletic eligibility of any football player, giving everyone who played in that season the opportunity for five years of eligibility instead of the normal four.
- From 2018 through 2025, players were allowed to participate in as many as four games in a redshirt season; previously, playing in even one game "burned" the redshirt. In 2024 and 2025, postseason games did not count against the four-game limit. These changes to redshirt rules have given very recent players several extra games to accumulate statistics.
- A more recent change that will significantly affect future career leaderboards was introduced in 2026 with full implementation starting with the 2027 freshman class. Going forward, redshirting will be prohibited, but players will have five years of full athletic eligibility, provided that they are no older than 19 when they first enroll in a postsecondary institution. Players who had remaining eligibility under previous rules at the end of the 2025 season will benefit from the new rule.

These lists are updated through Week 3 of the 2026 season. Players active for UTSA in 2026 are in bold.

== Passing ==
=== Passing yards ===
Career
Rank	Player	Yards	Years
1	Frank Harris	11,858	2019 2020 2021 2022 2023
2	**Owen McCown**	7,420	2023 2024 2025 2026
3	Eric Soza	6,952	2011 2012 2013
4	Dalton Sturm	5,768	2014 2015 2016 2017
5	Lowell Narcisse	1,643	2019 2020
6	Tucker Carter	1,273	2013 2014
7	Blake Bogenschutz	1,179	2014 2015
8	Cordale Grundy	993	2018 2019
9	Eddie Lee Marburger	777	2021 2022 2023 2024
10	Jordan Weeks	766	2018 2019 2020

Single season
Rank	Player	Yards	Year
1	Frank Harris	4,059	2022
2	**Owen McCown**	3,424	2024
3	Frank Harris	3,177	2021
4	**Owen McCown**	2,995	2025
5	Eric Soza	2,719	2013
6	Frank Harris	2,506	2023
7	Dalton Sturm	2,185	2017
8	Dalton Sturm	2,170	2016
9	Eric Soza	2,148	2011
10	Eric Soza	2,085	2012

Single game
Rank	Player	Yards	Year	Opponent
1	**Owen McCown**	434	2024	Tulsa
2	Frank Harris	414	2022	Middle Tennessee
3	Frank Harris	411	2023	South Florida
4	Frank Harris	395	2023	East Carolina
5	Frank Harris	392	2022	Texas Southern
6	Frank Harris	382	2022	UTEP
7	**Owen McCown**	379	2024	North Texas
8	**Owen McCown**	370	2025	Tulane
9	Dalton Sturm	367	2017	Southern Miss
10	Frank Harris	359	2022	Army
	Owen McCown	359	2026	Navy

=== Passing touchdowns ===
Career
Rank	Player	TDs	Years
1	Frank Harris	92	2019 2020 2021 2022 2023
2	**Owen McCown**	63	2023 2024 2025 2026
3	Dalton Sturm	49	2014 2015 2016 2017
4	Eric Soza	46	2011 2012 2013
5	Lowell Narcisse	11	2019 2020
6	Eddie Lee Marburger	7	2021 2022 2023 2024
7	Tucker Carter	5	2013 2014
	Cordale Grundy	5	2018 2019
9	Blake Bogenschutz	4	2014 2015
	Jared Johnson	4	2016

Single season
Rank	Player	TDs	Year
1	Frank Harris	32	2022
2	**Owen McCown**	30	2025
3	Frank Harris	27	2021
4	**Owen McCown**	25	2024
5	Eric Soza	20	2012
	Dalton Sturm	20	2016
7	Frank Harris	18	2023
8	Dalton Sturm	15	2017
9	Eric Soza	14	2011
10	Dalton Sturm	13	2015

Single game
Rank	Player	TDs	Year	Opponent
1	Frank Harris	6	2021	Western Kentucky (Note: This was the regularly scheduled game between the two teams. They also played in the 2021 C-USA championship game.)
2	**Owen McCown**	5	2025	East Carolina
3	Eric Soza	4	2012	Louisiana Tech
	Dalton Sturm	4	2015	Louisiana Tech
	Dalton Sturm	4	2017	Southern
	Frank Harris	4	2022	Texas Southern
	Frank Harris	4	2022	UAB
	Frank Harris	4	2022	North Texas (C-USA Championship Game)
	Frank Harris	4	2023	East Carolina
	**Owen McCown**	4	2024	Tulsa
	**Owen McCown**	4	2024	Memphis
	**Owen McCown**	4	2025	Incarnate Word
	**Owen McCown**	4	2025	Tulane

== Rushing ==
=== Rushing yards ===
Career
Rank	Player	Yards	Years
1	Sincere McCormick	3,929	2019 2020 2021
2	Jarveon Williams	2,393	2013 2014 2015 2016
3	Robert Henry Jr.	2,339	2023 2024 2025
4	Frank Harris	2,143	2019 2020 2021 2022 2023
5	Kevorian Barnes	1,803	2021 2022 2023 2024
6	David Glasco II	1,752	2011 2012 2013 2014
7	Brenden Brady	1,751	2018 2019 2020 2021 2022
8	Jalen Rhodes	1,728	2015 2016 2017
9	Dalton Sturm	1,227	2014 2015 2016 2017
10	Evans Okotcha	1,162	2011 2012 2013

Single season
Rank	Player	Yards	Year
1	Sincere McCormick	1,479	2021
2	Sincere McCormick	1,467	2020
3	Robert Henry Jr.	1,045	2025
4	Jarveon Williams	1,042	2015
5	Sincere McCormick	983	2019
6	Jarveon Williams	900	2016
7	Will Henderson III	866	2025
8	Kevorian Barnes	851	2022
9	Jalen Rhodes	827	2016
10	Kevorian Barnes	715	2023

Single game
Rank	Player	Yards	Year	Opponent
1	Sincere McCormick	251	2020	North Texas
2	Sincere McCormick	204	2021	Western Kentucky (C-USA Championship Game)
3	Sincere McCormick	197	2020	Texas State
4	Sincere McCormick	189	2019	UTEP
5	Will Henderson III	185	2025	Charlotte
6	Sincere McCormick	184	2021	Memphis
7	Jarveon Williams	181	2015	Charlotte
8	A'Marion Peterson	179	2026	UTSA
9	Robert Henry Jr.	178	2024	Temple
10	Robert Henry Jr.	177	2025	Texas A&M

=== Rushing touchdowns ===
Career
Rank	Player	TDs	Years
1	Sincere McCormick	34	2019 2020 2021
2	Frank Harris	28	2019 2020 2021 2022 2023
3	Robert Henry Jr.	27	2023 2024 2025
4	David Glasco II	20	2011 2012 2013 2014
5	Jarveon Williams	19	2013 2014 2015 2016
6	Jalen Rhodes	18	2015 2016 2017
7	Brenden Brady	17	2018 2019 2020 2021 2022
8	Eric Soza	16	2011 2012 2013
9	Kevorian Barnes	14	2021 2022 2023 2024
10	Evans Okotcha	10	2011 2012 2013

Single season
Rank	Player	TDs	Year
1	Sincere McCormick	15	2021
2	Sincere McCormick	11	2020
	Robert Henry Jr.	11	2023
4	Jalen Rhodes	9	2016
	Frank Harris	9	2020
	Brenden Brady	9	2022
	Frank Harris	9	2022
	Robert Henry Jr.	9	2025
9	Evans Okotcha	8	2012
	Jarveon Williams	8	2015
	Jarveon Williams	8	2016
	Sincere McCormick	8	2019
	Brandon High Jr.	8	2024

Single game
Rank	Player	TDs	Year	Opponent
1	A'Marion Peterson	4	2026	UTSA
2	Evans Okotcha	3	2012	Georgia State
	Eric Soza	3	2012	Idaho
	Jalen Rhodes	3	2016	Southern Miss
	Jarveon Williams	3	2016	Middle Tennessee
	Frank Harris	3	2020	Texas State
	Sincere McCormick	3	2020	Louisiana Tech
	Sincere McCormick	3	2021	Memphis
	Sincere McCormick	3	2021	Louisiana Tech
	Sincere McCormick	3	2021	Western Kentucky (C-USA Championship Game)
	Frank Harris	3	2022	Rice
	Frank Harris	3	2023	South Florida
	**A'Marion Peterson**	3	2026	South Florida

== Receiving ==
=== Receptions ===
Career
Rank	Player	Rec	Years
1	Joshua Cephus	313	2019 2020 2021 2022 2023
2	Zakhari Franklin	261	2019 2020 2021 2022
3	Devin McCuin	152	2023 2024 2025
4	Kam Jones	130	2011 2012 2013 2014
5	Kerry Thomas Jr.	127	2014 2015 2016 2017
6	De'Corian Clark	113	2019 2020 2021 2022 2024
7	Oscar Cardenas	95	2020 2021 2022 2023 2024
8	Aaron Grubb	94	2012 2013 2014 2015
9	Tykee Ogle-Kellogg	89	2018 2019 2020 2021 2022 2023
10	Kenny Harrison	88	2011 2012 2013 2014

Single season
Rank	Player	Rec	Year
1	Zakhari Franklin	93	2022
2	Joshua Cephus	89	2023
3	Joshua Cephus	87	2022
4	Zakhari Franklin	81	2021
5	Joshua Cephus	71	2021
6	Devin McCuin	65	2025
7	Joshua Cephus	58	2020
8	Kerry Thomas Jr.	52	2015
	De'Corian Clark	52	2021
10	De'Corian Clark	51	2022

Single game
Rank	Player	Rec	Year	Opponent
1	Zakhari Franklin	12	2020	Army
2	Joshua Cephus	11	2022	North Texas (Note: This was the regularly scheduled game between the two teams. They also played in the 2022 C-USA championship game.)
	Joshua Cephus	11	2022	North Texas (C-USA Championship Game)
	Devin McCuin	11	2024	Kennesaw State
5	Kerry Thomas Jr.	10	2015	Charlotte
	Greg Campbell Jr.	10	2017	Southern Miss
	Kerry Thomas Jr.	10	2017	Marshall
	Zakhari Franklin	10	2021	Illinois
	Zakhari Franklin	10	2021	UTEP
	Zakhari Franklin	10	2022	Houston
	Joshua Cephus	10	2022	Army
	Zakhari Franklin	10	2022	Army
	Zakhari Franklin	10	2022	North Texas (C-USA Championship Game)
	David Amador II	10	2025	Tulane

=== Receiving yards ===
Career
Rank	Player	Yards	Years
1	Joshua Cephus	3,639	2019 2020 2021 2022 2023
2	Zakhari Franklin	3,349	2019 2020 2021 2022
3	Devin McCuin	1,696	2023 2024 2025
4	Kerry Thomas Jr.	1,630	2014 2015 2016 2017
5	De'Corian Clark	1,573	2019 2020 2021 2022 2024
6	Kam Jones	1,478	2011 2012 2013 2014
7	Tykee Ogle-Kellogg	1,358	2018 2019 2020 2021 2022 2023
8	Josh Stewart	1,200	2016 2017
9	Oscar Cardenas	1,138	2020 2021 2022 2023 2024
10	David Amador II	921	2023 2024 2025

Single season
Rank	Player	Yards	Year
1	Joshua Cephus	1,151	2023
2	Zakhari Franklin	1,137	2022
3	Zakhari Franklin	1,027	2021
4	Joshua Cephus	985	2022
5	Joshua Cephus	819	2021
6	De'Corian Clark	755	2021
7	De'Corian Clark	741	2022
8	Devin McCuin	726	2025
9	Zakhari Franklin	694	2020
10	Josh Stewart	682	2016

Single game
Rank	Player	Yards	Year	Opponent
1	De'Corian Clark	217	2022	Texas Southern
2	Joshua Cephus	183	2023	East Carolina
3	Joshua Cephus	163	2023	South Florida
4	De'Corian Clark	160	2021	Western Kentucky
5	Zakhari Franklin	155	2021	Illinois
6	Kerry Thomas Jr.	145	2016	Charlotte
7	Zakhari Franklin	144	2022	North Texas (C-USA Championship Game)
8	Tykee Ogle-Kellogg	142	2022	UTEP
9	De'Corian Clark	139	2022	Middle Tennessee
10	Zakhari Franklin	138	2020	Army

=== Receiving touchdowns ===
Career
Rank	Player	TDs	Years
1	Zakhari Franklin	37	2019 2020 2021 2022
2	Joshua Cephus	28	2019 2020 2021 2022 2023
3	Kerry Thomas Jr.	17	2014 2015 2016 2017
4	De'Corian Clark	16	2019 2020 2021 2022 2024
	Devin McCuin	16	2023 2024 2025
6	Tykee Ogle-Kellogg	15	2018 2019 2020 2021 2022 2023
7	Oscar Cardenas	9	2020 2021 2022 2023 2024
8	Josh Stewart	8	2016 2017
	Patrick Overmyer	8	2024 2025
10	Cole Hubble	6	2011 2012 2013 2014
	Kenny Bias	6	2012 2013 2014
	David Morgan II	6	2011 2013 2014 2015
	Willie McCoy	6	2023 2024
	David Amador II	6	2023 2024 2025

Single season
Rank	Player	TDs	Year
1	Zakhari Franklin	15	2022
2	Zakhari Franklin	12	2021
3	Joshua Cephus	10	2023
4	Kerry Thomas Jr.	8	2016
	De'Corian Clark	8	2022
	Devin McCuin	8	2025
7	Zakhari Franklin	7	2020
	De'Corian Clark	7	2021
	Tykee Ogle-Kellogg	7	2023
10	Joshua Cephus	6	2021

Single game
Rank	Player	TDs	Year	Opponent
1	De'Corian Clark	3	2021	Western Kentucky
	De'Corian Clark	3	2022	Texas Southern
	Zakhari Franklin	3	2022	North Texas (C-USA Championship Game)
4	25 times by 18 players	2	Most recent: Mekhi Anderson 2026 vs. Florida Atlantic	

== Total offense ==
Total offense is the sum of passing and rushing statistics. It does not include receiving or returns.

=== Total offense yards ===
Career
Rank	Player	Yards	Years
1	Frank Harris	14,001	2019 2020 2021 2022 2023
2	Eric Soza	7,971	2011 2012 2013
3	**Owen McCown**	7,855	2023 2024 2025 2026
4	Dalton Sturm	6,995	2014 2015 2016 2017
5	Sincere McCormick	3,929	2019 2020 2021
6	Jarveon Williams	2,396	2013 2014 2015 2016
7	Robert Henry Jr.	2,339	2023 2024 2025
8	Lowell Narcisse	2,261	2019 2020
9	Kevorian Barnes	1,803	2021 2022 2023 2024
10	David Glasco II	1,752	2011 2012 2013 2014

Single season
Rank	Player	Yards	Year
1	Frank Harris	4,659	2022
2	**Owen McCown**	3,764	2024
3	Frank Harris	3,743	2021
4	Eric Soza	3,088	2013
5	**Owen McCown**	3,019	2025
6	Frank Harris	2,829	2023
7	Dalton Sturm	2,730	2017
8	Eric Soza	2,450	2012
9	Dalton Sturm	2,483	2016
10	Eric Soza	2,433	2011

Single game
Rank	Player	Yards	Year	Opponent
1	Frank Harris	523	2023	South Florida
2	**Owen McCown**	467	2024	North Texas
3	Frank Harris	445	2022	Middle Tennessee
4	Frank Harris	423	2022	Texas Southern
5	**Owen McCown**	412	2024	Tulsa
6	Frank Harris	400	2021	Western Kentucky
	Frank Harris	400	2022	Houston
	Frank Harris	400	2023	East Carolina
9	Frank Harris	396	2022	UTEP
10	Dalton Sturm	395	2015	Southern Miss

=== Touchdowns responsible for ===
"Touchdowns responsible for" is the official NCAA term for combined passing and rushing touchdowns.

Career
Rank	Player	TDs	Years
1	Frank Harris	120	2019 2020 2021 2022 2023
2	**Owen McCown**	67	2023 2024 2025 2026
3	Eric Soza	62	2011 2012 2013
4	Dalton Sturm	56	2014 2015 2016 2017
5	Sincere McCormick	34	2019 2020 2021
6	Robert Henry Jr.	27	2023 2024 2025
7	David Glasco II	20	2011 2012 2013 2014
	Jarveon Williams	20	2013 2014 2015 2016
9	Jalen Rhodes	18	2015 2016 2017 2018
	Brenden Brady	18	2018 2019 2020 2021 2022

Single season
Rank	Player	TDs	Year
1	Frank Harris	41	2022
2	Frank Harris	33	2021
3	**Owen McCown**	31	2025
4	**Owen McCown**	28	2024
5	Eric Soza	26	2012
6	Dalton Sturm	24	2016
7	Frank Harris	22	2023
8	Frank Harris	21	2020
9	Eric Soza	19	2013
10	Eric Soza	17	2011
	Dalton Sturm	17	2017

Single game
Rank	Player	TDs	Year	Opponent
1	Frank Harris	6	2021	Western Kentucky
	Frank Harris	6	2023	South Florida
3	Dalton Sturm	5	2017	Southern
	Frank Harris	5	2020	UTEP
	Frank Harris	5	2022	Texas Southern
	Frank Harris	5	2022	Rice
	Frank Harris	5	2022	North Texas (C-USA Championship Game)
	**Owen McCown**	5	2025	East Carolina
9	18 times by 5 players	4	Most recent: **A'Marion Peterson** , 2026 vs. North Texas	

== Defense ==
=== Interceptions ===
Career
Rank	Player	Ints	Years
1	Triston Wade	12	2011 2012 2013 2014
2	Nate Gaines	9	2015 2016 2017
3	Corey Mayfield Jr.	7	2018 2019 2020 2021 2022
4	Bennett Okotcha	6	2013 2014 2015
	Michael Egwuagu	6	2013 2014 2015 2016
	Cassius Grady	6	2018 2019
	Zah Frazier	6	2022 2023 2024

Single season
Rank	Player	Ints	Year
1	Nate Gaines	6	2017
	Zah Frazier	6	2024
3	Clifford Chattman	5	2022
4	Triston Wade	4	2012
	Erik Brown	4	2012
	Triston Wade	4	2014
	Bennett Okotcha	4	2015
	Cassius Grady	4	2018
	Rashad Wisdom	4	2020
10	Trevor Baker	3	2015
	Michael Egwuagu	3	2015
	Nate Gaines	3	2015
	Corey Mayfield Jr.	3	2022
	Tyan Milton	3	2025
	Shad Banks Jr.	3	2025

Single game
Rank	Player	Ints	Year	Opponent
1	Nate Gaines	2	2015	UTEP
	Triston Wade	2	2013	Tulsa
	Bennett Okotcha	2	2015	Southern Miss
	Zah Frazier	2	2024	East Carolina
	Zah Frazier	2	2024	North Texas
	Zah Frazier	2	2024	Temple

=== Tackles ===
Career
Rank	Player	Tackles	Years
1	Jamal Ligon	335	2020 2021 2022 2023 2024
2	Rashad Wisdom	314	2019 2020 2021 2022 2023
3	Triston Wade	293	2011 2012 2013 2014
4	Trevor Harmanson	245	2019 2020 2021 2022
5	Drew Douglas	242	2012 2013 2014 2015
6	Nic Johnston	220	2011 2012 2013 2014
7	Steven Kurfehs	214	2011 2012 2013
8	Michael Egwuagu	211	2013 2014 2015 2016
9	Nate Gaines	200	2015 2016 2017

Single season
Rank	Player	Tackles	Year
1	Josiah Tauaefa	115	2016
2	Brandon Reeves	95	2012
	Rashad Wisdom	95	2020
4	Triston Wade	94	2013
	CJ Levine	94	2018
6	Duke Wheeler	92	2015
	Shad Banks Jr.	92	2025
8	Jamal Ligon	90	2022
9	La'Kel Bass	87	2016
	Rashad Wisdom	87	2021

Single game
Rank	Player	Tackles	Year	Opponent
1	Jamal Ligon	19	2020	Middle Tennessee
2	Cody Rogers	16	2011	McNeese State
	Kelechi Nwachuku	16	2020	Army

=== Sacks ===
Career
Rank	Player	Sacks	Years
1	Marcus Davenport	22.0	2014 2015 2016 2017
	Trey Moore	22.0	2021 2022 2023
3	Jimmori Robinson	15.0	2021 2022 2023 2024
4	Jason Neill	14.0	2011 2012 2013 2014 2015
5	Trumane Bell II	13.5	2019 2020 2021 2022 2023
6	Clarence Hicks	12.5	2019 2020 2021
7	DeQuarius Henry	11.5	2017 2018 2019 2020 2021
8	Lorenzo Dantzler	11.0	2018 2019 2020 2021
9	Jamal Ligon	10.0	2020 2021 2022 2023 2024
10	Cody Rogers	9.0	2011 2012 2013 2014

Single season
Rank	Player	Sacks	Year
1	Trey Moore	14.0	2023
2	Clarence Hicks	10.5	2021
	Jimmori Robinson	10.5	2024
4	Jason Neill	8.5	2015
	Marcus Davenport	8.5	2017
6	Marlon Smith	8.0	2011
	Trey Moore	8.0	2022
8	Marcus Davenport	6.5	2016
9	Brandon Reeves	6.0	2011
	Josiah Tauaefa	6.0	2016

Single game
Rank	Player	Sacks	Year	Opponent
1	Marlon Smith	4.0	2011	McMurry
	Jimmori Robinson	4.0	2024	Temple

== Kicking ==
=== Field goals made ===
Career
Rank	Player	FGs	Years
1	Jared Sackett	55	2017 2018 2022
2	Hunter Duplessis	50	2018 2019 2020 2021
3	Sean Ianno	49	2011 2012 2013 2014
4	**Michael Petro**	21	2024 2025 2026
5	Tate Sandell	20	2022 2023 2024
6	Chase Allen	18	2023 2024
7	Victor Falcon	13	2015 2016 2017
8	Daniel Portillo	10	2014 2015 2016
9	Kristian Stern	5	2011 2012 2013 2014

Single season
Rank	Player	FGs	Year
1	Hunter Duplessis	24	2021
2	Jared Sackett	22	2022
3	Jared Sackett	19	2017
3	Tate Sandell	19	2024
5	Sean Ianno	17	2014
5	Hunter Duplessis	17	2020
5	**Michael Petro**	17	2025
8	Jared Sackett	14	2018
9	Chase Allen	13	2023
10	Victor Falcon	12	2016

Single game
Rank	Player	FGs	Year	Opponent
1	Sean Ianno	4	2011	Bacone
1	Sean Ianno	4	2012	South Alabama
1	Sean Ianno	4	2014	Southern Miss
1	Tate Sandell	4	2024	North Texas
5	23 times by 6 players	3	Most recent: **Michael Petro**, 2026 vs. Rice	

=== Field goal percentage ===
Career
Rank	Player	FG%	Years
1	**Michael Petro**	84.0%	2024 2025 2026
2	Kristian Stern	83.3%	2011 2012 2013 2014
3	Hunter Duplessis	82.0%	2018 2019 2020 2021
4	Jared Sackett	80.9%	2017 2018 2022
5	Tate Sandell	80.0%	2022 2023 2024
6	Chase Allen	75.0%	2023 2024
7	Sean Ianno	69.0%	2011 2012 2013 2014
8	Victor Falcon	65.0%	2015 2016 2017
9	Daniel Portillo	58.8%	2014 2015 2016

Single season
Rank	Player	FG%	Year
1	Chase Allen	86.7%	2023
2	Jared Sackett	86.4%	2017
3	Hunter Duplessis	85.0%	2020
3	**Michael Petro**	85.0%	2025
5	Kristian Stern	83.3%	2012
6	Tate Sandell	82.6%	2024
7	Hunter Duplessis	81.8%	2019
8	Jared Sackett	81.5%	2022
9	Sean Ianno	81.0%	2014
10	Hunter Duplessis	80.0%	2021

== Scoring ==
=== Points ===
Career
Rank	Player	Points	Years
1	Hunter Duplessis	278	2018 2019 2020 2021
2	Jared Sackett	265	2017 2018 2022
3	Sean Ianno	256	2011 2012 2013 2014
4	Zakhari Franklin	224	2019 2020 2021 2022
5	Sincere McCormick	210	2019 2020 2021

Single season
Rank	Player	Points	Year
1	Hunter Duplessis	135	2021
2	Jared Sackett	125	2022
3	**Michael Petro**	107	2025
4	Zakhari Franklin	92	2022
4	Tate Sandell	92	2024
6	Hunter Duplessis	91	2020
7	Sincere McCormick	90	2013

Single game
Rank	Player	Points	Year	Opponent
1	A'Marion Peterson	24	2026	UTSA
2	17 times by 11 players	18	Most recent: **A'Marion Peterson**, 2026 vs. South Florida	

=== Touchdowns ===
In official NCAA statistics, touchdown totals include touchdowns scored. Accordingly, these lists include rushing, receiving, and return touchdowns, but not passing touchdowns.

Career
Rank	Player	TDs	Years
1	Zakhari Franklin	37	2019 2020 2021 2022
2	Sincere McCormick	35	2019 2020 2021
3	Robert Henry Jr.	30	2023 2024 2025
4	Joshua Cephus	29	2019 2020 2021 2022 2023
4	Frank Harris	29	2019 2020 2021 2022 2023
6	David Glasco II	20	2011 2012 2013 2014
6	Jalen Rhodes	20	2015 2016 2017 2018

Single season
Rank	Player	TDs	Year
1	Sincere McCormick	15	2021
	Zakhari Franklin	15	2022
3	Zakhari Franklin	12	2021
4	Evans Okotcha	11	2012
4	Sincere McCormick	11	2020
4	Robert Henry Jr.	11	2023
4	Robert Henry Jr.	11	2025

Single game
Rank	Player	TDs	Year	Opponent
1	A'Marion Peterson	4	2026	UTSA
2	17 times by 11 players	3	Most recent: **A'Marion Peterson**, 2026 vs. South Florida	
