= List of UTSA Roadrunners in the NFL draft =

This is a list of UTSA Roadrunners football players in the NFL draft.

== Key ==
B	Back	K	Kicker	NT	Nose tackle
C	Center	LB	Linebacker	FB	Fullback
DB	Defensive back	P	Punter	HB	Halfback
DE	Defensive end	QB	Quarterback	WR	Wide receiver
DT	Defensive tackle	RB	Running back	G	Guard
E	End	T	Offensive tackle	TE	Tight end

== Selections ==
Year	Round	Pick	Player	Team	Position
2016	6	188	David Morgan II	Minnesota Vikings	TE
2018	1	14	Marcus Davenport	New Orleans Saints	DE
2022	4	134	Spencer Burford	San Francisco 49ers	T
2022	5	153	Riq Woolen	Seattle Seahawks	DB
2025	5	169	Zah Frazier	Chicago Bears	DB

== Notable undrafted players ==
Note: No drafts held before 1920

Debut year	Player name	Position	Debut NFL/AFL team	Notes
2015	Triston Wade	FS	Seattle Seahawks	
2016	Jason Neill	DT	Dallas Cowboys	
2016	Brian Price	NT	Green Bay Packers	
2017	Jarveon Williams	RB	Cincinnati Bengals	
2019	Kevin Strong	NT	Detroit Lions	
2019	Josiah Tauaefa	LB	New York Giants	
2020	Eric Banks	DE	Los Angeles Rams	
2022	Sincere McCormick	RB	Las Vegas Raiders	
2022	Leroy Watson	OT	Atlanta Falcons	
2024	Joshua Cephus	WR	Jacksonville Jaguars	
2024	Brandon Matterson	DE	Denver Broncos	
2024	Rashad Wisdom	S	Tampa Bay Buccaneers	
