= Owen McCown =

American football player (born 2003)

- McCown in 2026

No. 2 – UTSA Roadrunners
- Position: Quarterback
- Class: (redshirt) Senior

Personal information
- Born: February 14, 2003 (age 23); Dallas, Texas, U.S.
- Listed height: 6 ft 1 in (1.85 m)
- Listed weight: 190 lb (86 kg)

Career information
- High school: Rusk (Rusk, Texas)
- College: Colorado (2022); UTSA (2023–present)
- Stats at ESPN

Owen McCown (born February 14, 2003) is an American college football quarterback for the UTSA Roadrunners. He previously played for the Colorado Buffaloes.

== Early life ==
McCown was born in Dallas, Texas and played high school football at Rusk High School in Rusk, Texas. As a senior, he threw for 3,363 yards and 47 touchdowns with just four interceptions. McCown committed to play college football for the Colorado Buffaloes.

== College career ==
=== Colorado ===
McCown got his first career start in week 4 of the 2022 season versus UCLA where he completed 26 of 42 passing attempts for 258 yards and a touchdown with an interception, along with a touchdown on the ground. In his last start of the season, he completed 13 of 21 pass attempts for 104 yards and an interception, while also adding 18 yards on the ground, in a win versus California. McCown finished the 2022 season making three starts while throwing for 600 yards and two touchdowns with two interceptions. After the season, McCown announced his intention to enter the NCAA transfer portal.

=== UTSA ===
McCown transferred to play for the UTSA Roadrunners. McCown entered the 2023 season as the backup quarterback to Frank Harris and Eddie Lee Marburger. After UTSA trailed 31–0 at halftime against No. 23 Tennessee in Week 4, McCown relieved Marburger and, in his Roadrunners debut, completed 18 of 20 passes for 172 yards, two touchdowns, and one interception. McCown served as the primary backup quarterback when Harris returned from injury later in the season. In the 2023 Frisco Bowl against Marshall, McCown made his first career start for UTSA and completed 22 of 31 passes for 251 yards, two touchdowns, and two interceptions in a 35–17 victory.

In 2024, McCown won the starting quarterback job and started all 13 games, completing 294 of 467 passes for 3,424 yards with 25 touchdowns and 10 interceptions, while also rushing for 340 yards and three scores, totaling 3,764 yards of offense. Against Tulsa, McCown threw for a school-record 434 passing yards and four touchdowns in a 45–46 loss, setting a new UTSA single-game passing yardage record. He led the Roadrunners to a 7–6 record and a bowl victory over Coastal Carolina in the 2024 Myrtle Beach Bowl, where he was named the game’s Most Valuable Player after passing for 254 yards with a touchdown and rushing for a score. During the following offseason in July 2025, an incident involving McCown and former Memphis player Tahj Ra-El regarding alleged sign-stealing was publicly circulated. The situation stemmed from the teams' matchup on November 2, 2024, when Ra-El, who was no longer part of the Memphis program, reportedly sent Memphis' playbook to McCown. Both teams addressed the matter publicly, and no formal NCAA sanctions were reported.

In 2025, McCown remained UTSA’s starting quarterback, completing 277 of 410 passes for 2,995 yards and 30 touchdowns with seven interceptions on the season. He led the Roadrunners to a 7–6 record and their third consecutive bowl victory, defeating Florida International in the 2025 First Responder Bowl, where he was again named game Most Valuable Player after throwing for 295 yards and three touchdowns.

During the regular season, McCown tied the NCAA single-game completion-percentage benchmark for games with a minimum of 30 pass attempts and set a program single-game completion-percentage record by completing 31 of 33 passes for 370 yards and four touchdowns in a 48–26 win over Tulane. His performance matched the mark previously set by Kyle Allen in 2017. For his performance, he was named the American Athletic Conference Offensive Player of the Week. He also threw a career-high five touchdown passes in a 58–24 victory against East Carolina.

=== Statistics ===
Year	Team	Games			Passing								Rushing			
Year	Team	GP	GS	Record	Cmp	Att	Pct	Yds	Y/A	TD	Int	Rtg	Att	Yds	Avg	TD
2022	Colorado	4	3	1−2	57	100	57.0	600	6.0	2	2	110.0	27	38	1.4	2
2023	UTSA	7	1	1−0	43	58	74.1	442	7.6	4	3	150.6	15	51	3.4	0
2024	UTSA	13	13	7−6	294	467	63.0	3,424	7.3	25	10	137.0	86	340	3.9	3
2025	UTSA	13	13	7−6	277	410	67.6	2,995	7.3	30	7	149.7	45	24	0.5	1
2026	UTSA	9	9	7−2	189	278	68.0	2,016	7.3	13	4	141.5	51	124	2.4	1
Career		46	39	23−16	860	1,313	65.5	9,477	7.2	74	26	140.8	224	577	2.6	7

== Personal life ==
McCown is the son of former NFL quarterback Josh McCown, and nephew of his brother, also a former NFL quarterback, Luke McCown.
