= 2024 Myrtle Beach Bowl =

Postseason college football bowl game

- 5th Myrtle Beach Bowl
Coastal Carolina Chanticleers	UTSA Roadrunners
(6–6)	(6–6)
Sun Belt	The American
15	44
Head coach: Tim Beck	Head coach: Jeff Traylor
	1	2	3	4	Total
Coastal Carolina	0	0	0	15	15
UTSA	0	21	6	17	44
- Date: December 23, 2024
- Season: 2024
- Stadium: Brooks Stadium
- Location: Conway, South Carolina
- MVP: Owen McCown (QB, UTSA)
- Favorite: UTSA by 13.5
- National anthem: Lakieta Bagwell-Graves
- Referee: Rodney Burnette (CUSA)
- Attendance: 8,164

United States TV coverage
- Network: ESPN
- Announcers: Taylor Zarzour (play-by-play), Matt Stinchcomb (analyst), and Alyssa Lang (sideline)

International TV coverage
- Network: ESPN Brazil
- Announcers: ESPN Brazil: Matheus Pinheiro (play-by-play) and Deivis Chiodini (analyst)

The 2024 Myrtle Beach Bowl was a college football bowl game played on December 23, 2024, at Brooks Stadium located in Conway, South Carolina. The fifth annual Myrtle Beach Bowl featured Coastal Carolina and UTSA. The game began at approximately 11:00 a.m. EST and aired on ESPN. The Myrtle Beach Bowl was one of the 2024–25 bowl games concluding the 2024 FBS football season.

Despite the game being held at their home stadium, Coastal Carolina University leaders told fans the game was considered a neutral site due to the official host of the game being Visit Myrtle Beach.

== Teams ==
=== UTSA Roadrunners ===
UTSA compiled a 6–6 record (4–4 in conference), winning three of their final four games to become bowl eligible. The Roadrunners faced one ranked team, losing to Texas, 56–7. This was UTSA's fifth consecutive season with a bowl game appearance.

=== Coastal Carolina Chanticleers ===
Coastal Carolina posted a 6–6 record (3–5) in conference, losing six of their final nine games after starting the season with three consecutive wins. The Chanticleers did not face any ranked FBS teams during the season. This was also Coastal Carolina's fifth consecutive season with a bowl game appearance.

== Game summary ==
2024 Myrtle Beach Bowl

Quarter	1	2	3	4	Total
Coastal Carolina	0	0	0	15	15
UTSA	0	21	6	17	44

at Brooks Stadium • Conway, South Carolina

- Date: Monday, December 23, 2024
- Game time: 11:03 a.m. EST
- Game weather: Sunny • Temperature: 41 °F (5 °C) • Wind: 8 mph (13 km/h) south
- Game attendance: 8,164
- Referee: Rodney Burnette
- TV announcers (ESPN): Taylor Zarzour (play-by-play), Matt Stinchcomb (analyst), and Alyssa Lang (sideline)
- Box score

Game information

First Quarter

- No scoring.

Second Quarter

- (14:00) UTSA – Brandon High Jr. 9-yard run (Tate Sandell kick) 7 plays, 62 yards, TOP 02:13 (UTSA 7–0)
- (10:36) UTSA – Owen McCown 35-yard run (Tate Sandell kick) 4 plays, 81 yards, TOP 01:45 (UTSA 14–0)
- (07:12) UTSA – Patrick Overmyer 6-yard pass from Owen McCown (Tate Sandell kick) 4 plays, 57 yards, TOP 01:04 (UTSA 21–0)

Third Quarter

- (11:13) UTSA – Tate Sandell 38-yard FG 9 plays, 50 yards, TOP 03:47 (UTSA 24–0)
- (07:23) UTSA – Tate Sandell 27-yard FG 6 plays, 47 yards, TOP 02:21 (UTSA 27–0)

Fourth Quarter

- (14:52) CCU – Bryson Graves 50-yard pass from Tad Hudson (Kade Hensley kick) 2 plays, 50 yards, TOP 00:26 (UTSA 27–7)
- (14:40) UTSA – Chris Carpenter 93-yard kickoff return (Tate Sandell kick) 0 plays, 0 yards, TOP 00:12 (UTSA 34–7)
- (08:07) UTSA – Tate Sandell 29-yard FG 6 plays, 44 yards, TOP 03:26 (UTSA 37–7)
- (04:43) CCU – Senika McKie 9-yard pass from Tad Hudson (Tad Hudson pass to Brooks Johnson for 2-point conversion) 8 plays, 75 yards, TOP 03:24 (UTSA 37–15)
- (04:28) UTSA – Will Henderson III 51-yard run (Michael Petro kick) 1 play, 51 yards, TOP 00:15 (UTSA 44–15)

=== Statistics ===
Statistics	CCU	UTSA
First downs	16	23
Plays–yards	69–273	64–513
Rushes–yards	41–98	31–257
Passing yards	173	256
Passing: comp–att–int	17–28–1	24–33–1
Time of possession	33:37	26:23

Team	Category	Player	Statistics
Coastal Carolina	Passing	Tad Hudson	17/25 173 Yards 2TD
Coastal Carolina	Rushing	Braydon Bennett	22 attempts 53 yards
Coastal Carolina	Receiving	Bryson Graves	2 Catches 53 yards
UTSA	Passing	Owen McCown	23/30 253 yards 1TD 1 INT
UTSA	Rushing	Will Henderson III	5 attempts 81 yards 1TD
UTSA	Receiving	David Amador II	7 catches 110 yards
