= 2016 New Mexico Bowl =

2016 Gildan New Mexico Bowl
- 11th New Mexico Bowl
UTSA Roadrunners	New Mexico Lobos
(6–6)	(8–4)
C-USA	Mountain West
20	23
Head coach: Frank Wilson	Head coach: Bob Davie
	1	2	3	4	Total
UTSA	3	3	0	14	20
New Mexico	7	3	6	7	23
- Date: December 17, 2016
- Season: 2016
- Stadium: University Stadium
- Location: Albuquerque, New Mexico
- MVP: Offense: New Mexico QB Lamar Jordan; Defense:New Mexico LB Dakota Cox
- Favorite: New Mexico by 7
- National anthem: Senior Airman Rashaun Carter
- Referee: Jason McArthur (Sun Belt)
- Attendance: 29,688
- Payout: US$456,250

United States TV coverage
- Network: ESPN; ESPN Radio
- Announcers: Adam Amin, Mack Brown, Molly McGrath (ESPN); Roy Philpott, Clint Stoerner, Kevin Weidl (ESPN Radio)

The 2016 New Mexico Bowl was a college football bowl game played on December 17, 2016, at University Stadium in Albuquerque, New Mexico. The eleventh annual New Mexico Bowl, was one of the 2016–17 bowl games that concluded the 2016 FBS football season. The game aired on ESPN. Sponsored by clothing company Gildan Activewear, the game was officially known as the Gildan New Mexico Bowl.

== Teams ==
The game featured the UTSA Roadrunners of Conference USA against the New Mexico Lobos of the Mountain West Conference.

This was the third meeting between the schools, with the all-time series tied at 1–1. The previous meeting was on October 14, 2014, where the Lobos defeated the Roadrunners by a score of 21–9.

=== UTSA ===
The New Mexico Bowl was the first bowl appearance for the Roadrunners.

=== New Mexico ===
Powered by a triple option offense, the Lobos were led by coach Bob Davie who envisioned the offense he eventually installed while coaching at Notre Dame and playing against the service academies, who used the scheme effectively. The Lobos' offense led the Football Bowl Subdivision in rushing yards. Although both Austin Apodaca and Lamar Jordan had both started at quarterback for New Mexico during the season, Jordan was the more potent runner, whose 658 rushing yards ranked third on the team. A trio of running backs made large contributions to the rushing attack: senior Teriyon Gipson averaged 9.2 yards per rush to lead the team with 1209 yards, sophomore Tyrone Owens led the team with 134 rushes for 1084 yards, and junior Richard McQuarley rushed for a team-leading 16 touchdowns.

== Game summary ==
UTSA started the game with the ball; they put together a 65-yard drive over the next 6:15 and scored the first points of the game after Victor Falcon converted on a 23-yard field goal. New Mexico opened their storing with 4 seconds left in the first quarter with a 1-yard touchdown run. The first quarter ended 7–3, Lobos. With 1:32 left in the second quarter, Victor Falcon hit a 28-yard field goal to bring UTSA within 1 at 7–6. With time expiring in the first half, Jason Sanders converted a 52-yard field goal to put the Lobos up 10–6 at halftime. To open the second half, Teriyon Gipson capped a 10-play, 75-yard drive with a 10-yard touchdown rush. The extra point was blocked so New Mexico led 16–6. After trading punts UTSA got a drive into New Mexico territory but Dalton Sturm was picked off from the UNM 34. The Lobos went 3-and-out and punted. UTSA got good field position but faced a 4th and 15 from the Lobos 35. Sturm threw a 19-yard pass for the first down. 2 plays later he found Trevor Stevens, a senior wide receiver who had only caught 7 passes ever for his 1st career touchdown. The PAT was good and it was 16–13 Lobos. UNM drove down the field until they had a 4th and 1 at the 5 yard line. They converted and then Richard McQuarley got a 1-yard touchdown run to put UNM up 23–13. UTSA would strike at the end of the game but the Lobos recovered the onside kick.

=== Scoring summary ===
Scoring summary

Quarter	Time	Drive			Team	Scoring information	Score	
Quarter	Time	Plays	Yards	TOP	Team	Scoring information	UTSA	UNM
1	8:41	13	65	6:15	UTSA	23-yard field goal by Victor Falcon	3	0
1	0:04	9	66	4:21	UNM	Richard McQuarley 1-yard touchdown run, Jason Sanders kick good	3	7
2	1:32	13	49	6:40	UTSA	28-yard field goal by Victor Falcon	6	7
2	0:00	5	40	1:32	UNM	52-yard field goal by Jason Sanders	6	10
3	9:54	10	75	5:06	UNM	Teriyon Gipson 10-yard touchdown run, Jason Sanders kick no good	6	16
4	9:43	10	53	5:41	UTSA	Trevor Stevens 16-yard touchdown reception from Dalton Sturm, Victor Falcon kick good	13	16
4	2:22	12	75	7:21	UNM	Richard McQuarley 1-yard touchdown run, Jason Sanders kick good	13	23
4	0:25	9	80	1:58	UTSA	JaBryce Taylor 6-yard touchdown reception from Dalton Sturm, Victor Falcon kick good	20	23
"TOP" = time of possession. For other American football terms, see Glossary of American football.							20	23

=== Statistics ===
Statistics	UTSA	UNM
First downs	20	17
Third down efficiency	7–14	6–13
Rushes–yards	38–246 (6.5)	52–219 (4.2)
Passing yards	118	77
Passing: Comp–Att–Int	10–26–1	3–6–0
Time of possession	29:11	30:42

Category	Team	Player	Statistics
Passing	UTSA	Dalton Sturm	10/26, 118 yds, 2 TD, 1 INT
Passing	UNM	Lamar Jordan	3/4, 77 yds
Rushing	UTSA	Jarveon Williams	16 car, 125 yds
Rushing	UNM	Lamar Jordan	13 car, 81 yds
Receiving	UTSA	Kerry Thomas Jr.	4 rec, 45 yds
Receiving	UNM	Dameon Gamblin	1 rec, 34 yds
