= 2023 UTSA Roadrunners football team =

American college football season

2023 UTSA Roadrunners football

Frisco Bowl champion

Frisco Bowl, W 35–17 vs. Marshall
- Conference: American Athletic Conference
- Record: 9–4 (7–1 AAC)
- Head coach: Jeff Traylor (4th season)
- Offensive coordinator: Justin Burke (1st season)
- Offensive scheme: Multiple
- Defensive coordinator: Jess Loepp (3rd season)
- Base defense: 3–4
- Home stadium: Alamodome

2023 American Athletic Conference football standings
	Conf.			Overall
Team	W		L	W		L
No. 22 SMU y$	8	–	0	11	–	3
Tulane y	8	–	0	11	–	3
UTSA	7	–	1	9	–	4
Memphis	6	–	2	10	–	3
South Florida	4	–	4	7	–	6
Rice	4	–	4	6	–	7
Navy	4	–	4	5	–	7
North Texas	3	–	5	5	–	7
UAB	3	–	5	4	–	8
Florida Atlantic	3	–	5	4	–	8
Charlotte	2	–	6	3	–	9
Tulsa	2	–	6	4	–	8
Temple	1	–	7	3	–	9
East Carolina	1	–	7	2	–	10
Championship: SMU 26, Tulane 14
$ – Conference champion; y – Championship game participant; Rankings from AP Poll

The 2023 UTSA Roadrunners football team represented the University of Texas at San Antonio as a member of American Athletic Conference (The American or AAC) during the 2023 NCAA Division I FBS football season. They were led by fourth-year head coach Jeff Traylor. The Roadrunners played their home games at the Alamodome in San Antonio. This was their inaugural season as a member of the American Athletic Conference. The UTSA Roadrunners football team drew an average home attendance of 28,876 in 2023.

== Offseason ==
=== NFL departures ===
Name	Pos.	NFL team	Type
Trelon Smith	RB	Atlanta Falcons	rookie minicamp invite
Jared Sackett	K	Denver Broncos	rookie minicamp invite
Clifford Chattman	S	Atlanta Falcons	Free Agent Signing
Ahofitu Maka	OL	New York Giants	rookie minicamp invite
Corey Mayfield Jr.	CB	Baltimore Ravens	Free Agent signing

=== Outgoing transfers ===
Over the off-season, UTSA has lost fourteen players through the NCAA transfer portal. Eight are currently committed while the remainder are still actively pursuing new schools.

Name	Pos.	New school
Tye Edwards	RB	Northern Iowa
Caden Holt	LB	Blinn College
Xavier Player	CB	Texas Southern
Chace Davis	DL	Bowling Green
Dre Spriggs	WR	UTEP
Cameron Peters	QB	Kilgore College
Ronald Gurley Jr.	S	Unknown
River Gordon	IOL	Incarnate Word
JaCorey Hyder	TE	Lamar
Diego Tello	QB	Trinity Valley Community College
Isiah Davis	WR	Stephen F. Austin
Caleb Lewis	EDGE	Incarnate Word
Zakhari Franklin	WR	Ole Miss
Malik Jones	S	Abilene Christian

=== Incoming transfers ===
Over the off-season, UTSA added ten players through the transfer portal.

Name	Pos.	Class	Previous school
Rocko Griffin	RB	Sr	Vanderbilt
Owen McCown	QB	So	Colorado
Elliott Davison	S	Sr	Incarnate Word
Kameryn Alexander	CB	Sr	Sam Houston
Jackson Anderson	IOL	So	Colorado
Daron Allman	LB	Sr	Angelo State
Syrus Dumas	CB	Sr	New Mexico State
Chase Allen	K	Jr	Alabama
Jackson Anderson	IOL	RS-So	Colorado
Bryce Grays	S	RS-Fr	Washington State

== Preseason ==
The preseason AAC poll was released on July 25, 2023. The Roadrunners were predicted to finish second in the conference.

== Schedule ==
UTSA and The American announced the 2023 football schedule on February 21, 2023. On March 13 the game between UTSA and Army was moved from Saturday September 16 to Friday September 15.

Date	Time	Opponent	Site	TV	Result	Attendance
September 2	6:00 p.m.	at Houston*	TDECU Stadium; Houston, TX	FS1	L 14–17	37,862
September 9	2:30 p.m.	Texas State*	Alamodome; San Antonio, TX (I-35 Rivalry)	ESPN+	W 20–13	49,342
September 15	6:00 p.m.	Army*	Alamodome; San Antonio, TX	ESPN	L 29–37	27,138
September 23	3:00 p.m.	at No. 23 Tennessee*	Neyland Stadium; Knoxville, TN	SECN	L 14–45	101,915
October 7	1:00 p.m.	at Temple	Lincoln Financial Field; Philadelphia, PA	ESPN+	W 49–34	18,388
October 14	7:00 p.m.	UAB	Alamodome; San Antonio, TX	ESPNU	W 41–20	23,808
October 21	5:00 p.m.	at Florida Atlantic	FAU Stadium; Boca Raton, FL	ESPN+	W 36–10	17,241
October 28	2:30 p.m.	East Carolina^{†}	Alamodome; San Antonio, TX	ESPN+	W 41–27	22,629
November 4	2:00 p.m.	at North Texas	DATCU Stadium; Denton, TX	ESPN+	W 37–29	17,354
November 11	6:30 p.m.	Rice	Alamodome; San Antonio, TX	ESPNU	W 34–14	28,245
November 17	8:00 p.m.	South Florida	Alamodome; San Antonio, TX	ESPN2	W 49–21	22,096
November 24	2:30 p.m.	at No. 23 Tulane	Yulman Stadium; New Orleans, LA	ABC	L 16–29	25,103
December 19	8:00 p.m.	vs. Marshall*	Toyota Stadium; Frisco, TX (Frisco Bowl)	ESPN	W 35–17	11,215
*Non-conference game; ^{†}Homecoming; Rankings from AP Poll (and CFP Rankings, after November 1) - Released prior to game; All times are in Central time

== Coaching staff ==
Name	Position	Consecutive seasons at UTSA	Alma Mater
Jeff Traylor	Head coach	4	Stephen F. Austin (1990)
Justin Burke	Associate head coach Offensive coordinator Tight ends	4	Louisville (2011)
Jess Loepp	Defensive Coordinator; Safeties	4	University of Central Oklahoma (2000)
Jerrett Anderson	Assistant Offensive-line coach	1	New Mexico (1993)
Sean Davis	Quarterbacks	1	Azusa Pacific (2006)
Nick Graham	Defensive Pass Game Coordinator; Cornerbacks	4	University of Tulsa (2013)
Julian Griffin	Running Backs; NFL Liaison	4	University of Louisiana at Monroe (2012)
Siddiq Haynes	Defensive Line	2	University of Delaware (2011)
Joe Price	Associate Head Coach; Offensive Pass Game Coordinator; Wide Receivers	1	Harding University (2009)
Brad Sherrod	Linebackers	3	Duke University (1993)
Kurt Traylor	Running game Coordinator	4	Texas A&M University–Commerce (1995)

== Game summaries ==
=== At Houston ===
	1	2	3	4	Total
Roadrunners	7	0	0	7	14
Cougars	7	3	7	0	17

=== Texas State ===
Texas State Bobcats at UTSA Roadrunners – Game summary

Quarter	1	2	3	4	Total
Bobcats	0	10	0	3	13
Roadrunners	3	7	7	3	20

at Alamodome, San Antonio, Texas

- Date: September 9
- Game time: 2:30 p.m. CDT
- Game weather: None (played indoors)
- Game attendance: 49,342
- Referee: Kevin Randall
- TV announcers (ESPN+): Lincoln Rose, Stanford Routt, and Morgan Uber
- Box score, Recap

Game information
First quarter
- UTSA – Chase Allen 46-yard field goal, 3:01. Roadrunners 3–0. Drive: 11 plays, 39 yards, 3:54.

Second quarter

- UTSA – Rocko Griffin 20-yard run (Chase Allen kick), 12:48. Roadrunners 10–0. Drive: 6 plays, 57 yards, 1:57.
- TXST – Jahmyl Jeter 3-yard run (Mason Shipley kick), 5:11. Roadrunners 10–7. Drive: 11 plays, 66 yards, 3:50.
- TXST – Mason Shipley 42-yard field goal, 0:16. Tied 10–10. Drive: 8 plays, 64 yards, 1:12.

Third quarter

- UTSA – Willie McCoy 20-yard pass from Frank Harris (Chase Allen kick), 3:14. Roadrunners 17–10. Drive: 8 plays, 68 yards, 2:38.

Fourth quarter

- TXST – Mason Shipley 43-yard field goal, 10:37. Roadrunners 17–13. Drive: 5 plays, 36 yards, 2:31.
- UTSA – Chase Allen 43-yard field goal, 5:47. Roadrunners 20–13. Drive: 14 plays, 46 yards, 4:42.

Statistics

Statistics	TXST	UTSA
First downs	13	28
Total yards	242	372
Rushing yards	31	158
Passing yards	211	214
Turnovers	0	1
Time of possession	22:37	37:23

Team	Category	Player	Statistics
Texas State	Passing	T. J. Finley	16/30, 211 yards
Texas State	Rushing	Ismail Mahdi	6 rushes, 23 yards
Texas State	Receiving	Drew Donley	5 receptions, 79 yards
UTSA	Passing	Frank Harris	26/37, 214 yards, TD
UTSA	Rushing	Kevorian Barnes	26 rushes, 103 yards
UTSA	Receiving	Tykee Ogle-Kellogg	6 receptions, 78 yards

=== Army ===
Army Black Knights at UTSA Roadrunners

Quarter	1	2	3	4	Total
Black Knights	14	6	10	7	37
Roadrunners	0	14	7	8	29

at Alamodome, San Antonio, TX

- Date: September 15, 2023
- Game time: 6:00 p.m. CDT
- Game weather: Temperature: 72 °F (22 °C) • Weather: Indoor
- Game attendance: 27,138
- Referee: Tim Rich
- TV announcers (ESPN): Anish Shroff (play-by-play), Andre Ware (analyst) & Paul Carcaterra (sideline)
- ESPN – Army starts fast, holds off UTSA 37–29 /// Box Score, Army at UTSA /// Army Pregame Notes /// UTSA Pregame Notes /// Postgame Notes

Game information

First quarter

- (07:32) ARMY TD – Hayden Reed 1-yard rush, Quinn Maretzki kick
  Drive: 16 plays, 75 yards, 7:28; Army 7–0
- (01:15) ARMY TD – Jakobi Buchanan 10-yard rush, Quinn Maretzki kick
  Drive: 9 plays, 41 yards, 5:51; Army 14–0

Second quarter

- (12:45) UTSA TD – Robert Henry Jr. 19-yard rush, Chase Allen kick
  Drive: 11 plays, 75 yards, 3:30; Army 14–7
- (07:59) ARMY FG – Quinn Maretzki 23-yard field goal
  Drive: 8 plays, 69 yards, 4:46; Army 17–7
- (01:06) ARMY FG – Quinn Maretzki 45-yard field goal
  Drive: 13 plays, 45 yards, 4:44; Army 20–7
- (00:00) UTSA TD – Tykee Ogle-Kellogg 46-yard pass from Eddie Lee Marburger, Chase Allen kick
  Drive: 9 plays, 75 yards, 1:06; Army 20–14

Third quarter

- (09:13) ARMY FG – Quinn Maretzki 36-yard field goal
  Drive: 7 plays, 30 yards, 4:06; Army 23–14
- (07:04) UTSA TD – Joshua Cephus 44-yard pass from Eddie Lee Marburger, Chase Allen kick
  Drive: 6 plays, 75 yards, 2:09; Army 23–21
- (06:09) ARMY TD – Noah Short 25-yard pass from Bryson Daily, Quinn Maretzki kick
  Drive: 2 plays, 80 yards, 0:48; Army 30–21

Fourth quarter

- (06:45) ARMY TD – Bryson Daily 3-yard rush, Quinn Maretzki kick
  Drive: 14 plays, 70 yards, 8:37; Army 37–21
- (06:12) UTSA TD – Devin McCuin 72-yard pass from Eddie Lee Marburger, Devin McCuin pass
  Drive: 2 plays, 75 yards, 0:33; Army 37–29

Passing

- ARMY – Bryson Daily: 7/17, 133 yards, 1 TD
- UTSA – Eddie Lee Marburger: 17/25, 239 yards, 3 TD

Rushing

- ARMY – Hayden Reed: 20 carries, 107 yards, 1 TD
- UTSA – Rocko Griffin: 7 carries, 53 yards

Receiving

- ARMY – Isaiah Alston: 2 receptions, 68 yards
- UTSA – Joshua Cephus: 8 receptions, 84 yards, 1 TD

Defense

- ARMY – Leo Lowin: 7 total tackles (4 solo, 3 assisted)
- UTSA – Martavius French: 10 total tackles (4 solo, 6 assisted), 0.5 tackles for loss, 1 quarterback hurry

Statistics	ARMY	UTSA
First downs	23	14
3rd down efficiency	8–20	4–10
4th down efficiency	6–6	1–2
Plays–yards	83–442	49–360
Rushes–yards	65–254	22–121
Passing yards	188	239
Passing: Comp–Att–Int	8–18–0	17–27–0
Penalties–yards	0–0	5–35
Turnovers	0	1
Time of possession	44:25	15:35

=== at No. 23 Tennessee ===
Game Four – UTSA Roadrunners (1-2) at No. 23 Tennessee Volunteers (2-1) – Game summary

Quarter	1	2	3	4	Total
UTSA	0	0	14	0	14
No. 23 Tennessee	14	17	0	14	45

at Neyland Stadium • Knoxville, Tennessee

- Date: Saturday, September 23, 2023
- Game time: 4:00 p.m. EST
- Game weather: Sunny, 81 °F (27 °C)
- Game attendance: 101,915
- Referee: Jason Autrey
- TV announcers (SECN): Dave Neal (play-by-play), Derek Mason (analyst), Taylor Davis (sideline)

Game information

First quarter

- (14:40) TENN – Joe Milton III 81-yard run (Charles Campbell kick) (Drive: 1 play, 81 yards, 0:14; Tennessee 7-0)
- (10:03) TENN – Dylan Sampson 10-yard run (Charles Campbell kick) (Drive: 9 plays, 62 yards, 2:56; Tennessee 14-0)

Second quarter

- (14:23) TENN – Kaleb Webb 18-yard pass from Joe Milton III (Charles Campbell kick) (Drive: 2 plays, 43 yards, 0:26; Tennessee 21-0)
- (11:10) TENN – Ramel Keyton 48-yard pass from Joe Milton III (Charles Campbell kick) (Drive: 4 plays, 60 yards, 1:17; Tennessee 28-0)
- (3:21) TENN – Charles Campbell 29-yard field goal (Drive: 5 plays, 39 yards, 1:43; Tennessee 31-0)

Third quarter

- (7:32) UTSA – Joshua Cephus 3-yard pass from Owen McCown (Chase Allen kick) (Drive: 15 plays, 75 yards, 7:28; Tennessee 31-7)
- (5:16) UTSA – Tykee Ogle-Kellogg 43-yard pass from Owen McCown (Chase Allen kick) (Drive: 4 plays, 66 yards, 1:13; Tennessee 31-14)

Fourth quarter

- (12:42) TENN – Jabari Small 2-yard run (Charles Campbell kick) (Drive: 12 plays, 66 yards, 4:40; Tennessee 38-14)
- (10:17) TENN – Dylan Sampson 41-yard run (Charles Campbell kick) (Drive: 2 plays, 70 yards, 0:33; Tennessee 45-14)

Statistics	UTSA	TENN
First downs	16	21
Total yards	81–319	66–512
Rushing yards	40–88	33–303
Passing yards	231	209
Passing: Comp–Att–Int	30–41–2	18–33–0
Time of possession	37:12	22:48

Team	Category	Player	Statistics
UTSA	Passing	Owen McCown	18/20, 170 yards, 2 TD, INT
UTSA	Rushing	Kevorian Barnes	13 rushes, 40 yards
UTSA	Receiving	Joshua Cephus	7 receptions, 58 yards, TD
Tennessee	Passing	Joe Milton III	18/31, 209 yards, 2 TD
Tennessee	Rushing	Dylan Sampson	11 carries, 139 yards, 2 TD
Tennessee	Receiving	Ramel Keyton	1 reception, 48 yards, TD

=== At Temple ===
	1	2	3	4	Total
Roadrunners	7	21	7	14	49
Owls	14	7	0	13	34

=== UAB ===
	1	2	3	4	Total
Blazers	7	6	7	0	20
Roadrunners	21	3	7	10	41

=== At Florida Atlantic ===
UTSA Roadrunners (3–3) vs Florida Atlantic Owls (3–3) – Game summary

Quarter	1	2	3	4	Total
Roadrunners	7	13	9	7	36
Owls	10	0	0	0	10

at FAU Stadium • Boca Raton, Florida

- Date: October 21
- Game time: 6:00 p.m. EDT
- Game weather: Sunny • Temperature: 87 °F (31 °C) • Wind: NW at 7 miles per hour (11 km/h)
- Game attendance: 17,241
- Referee: Kevin Randall
- TV announcers (ESPN+): Richard Cross (play-by-play), Taylor McHargue (analyst)

Game information

First quarter

- (9:43) UTSA – Robert Henry Jr. 15 yard run, Chase Allen kick (Drive: 14 plays, 75 yards, 5:17; UTSA 7–0)
- (6:20) FAU – Logan Lupo 37 yard field goal (Drive: 11 plays, 56 yards, 3:23; UTSA 7–3)
- (0:23) FAU – Latrell Jean 11 yard interception return, Logan Lupo kick (Florida Atlantic 10–7)

Second quarter

- (11:51) UTSA – Chase Allen 34 yard field goal (Drive: 9 plays, 58 yards, 3:32; Tied 10–10)
- (6:47) UTSA – Willie McCoy 10 yard pass from Frank Harris, Chase Allen kick (Drive: 9 plays, 65 yards, 3:44; UTSA 17–10)
- (0:00) UTSA – Chase Allen 37 yard field goal (Drive: 4 plays, 17 yards, 0:26; UTSA 20–10)

Third quarter

- (8:16) UTSA – Tykee Ogle-Kellogg 42 yard pass from Frank Harris, Chase Allen kick (Drive: 6 plays, 77 yards, 2:28; UTSA 27–10)
- (1:24) UTSA – Team safety (UTSA 29–10)

Fourth quarter

- (2:32) UTSA – Rocko Griffin 6 yard run, Chase Allen kick (Drive: 6 plays, 26 yards, 3:21; UTSA 36–10)

Statistics	UTSA	Florida Atlantic
First downs	27	12
Plays–yards	79–437	62–162
Rushes–yards	43–176	28–20
Passing yards	261	142
Passing: comp–att–int	26–36–2	19–34–2
Turnovers		
Time of possession	35:33	24:27

Team	Category	Player	Statistics
UTSA	Passing	Frank Harris	26/35, 261 yards, 2 TD, 2 INT
UTSA	Rushing	Kevorian Barnes	10 carries, 56 yards
UTSA	Receiving	Devin McCuin	5 receptions, 64 yards
Florida Atlantic	Passing	Daniel Richardson	19/34, 142 yards, 2 INT
Florida Atlantic	Rushing	Larry McCammon	15 carries, 30 yards
Florida Atlantic	Receiving	Je’Quan Burton	5 receptions, 68 yards

=== East Carolina ===
East Carolina Pirates (1-6) vs UTSA Roadrunners (4-3) – Game summary

Quarter	1	2	3	4	Total
Pirates	17	3	0	7	27
Roadrunners	14	17	3	7	41

at Alamodome • San Antonio, Texas

- Date: October 28th
- Game time: 3:30 p.m. EST
- Game attendance: 22,629
- TV: ESPN+

Game information

First quarter

Second quarter

Third quarter

Fourth quarter

Statistics	East Carolina	UTSA
First downs		
Plays–yards	–	–
Rushes–yards	–	–
Passing yards		
Passing: comp–att–int	––	––
Turnovers		
Time of possession		

Team	Category	Player	Statistics
East Carolina	Passing		
East Carolina	Rushing		
East Carolina	Receiving		
UTSA	Passing		
UTSA	Rushing		
UTSA	Receiving		

=== At North Texas ===
	1	2	3	4	Total
Roadrunners	10	17	3	7	37
Mean Green	0	13	0	16	29

=== Rice ===
Rice Owls at UTSA Roadrunners – Game summary

Quarter	1	2	3	4	Total
Owls	0	7	0	7	14
Roadrunners	3	7	21	3	34

at Alamodome, San Antonio, Texas

- Date: November 11
- Game time: 5:30 p.m. CST
- Game weather: None (played indoors)
- Game attendance: 28,245
- Referee: Tim Rich
- TV announcers (ESPNU): Drew Carter and Dustin Fox

Game information
First quarter
- UTSA – Chase Allen 26-yard field goal, 7:00. Roadrunners 3–0. Drive: 10 plays, 58 yards, 3:38.

Second quarter

- UTSA – Joshua Cephus 6-yard pass from Frank Harris (Chase Allen kick), 0:57. Roadrunners 10–0. Drive: 9 plays, 62 yards, 3:43.
- RICE – Luke McCaffrey 27-yard pass from A. J. Padgett (Tim Horn kick), 0:22. Roadrunners 10–7. Drive: 4 plays, 75 yards, 0:35.

Third quarter

- UTSA – Robert Henry Jr. 1-yard run (Chase Allen kick), 9:46. Roadrunners 17–7. Drive: 9 plays, 63 yards, 3:47.
- UTSA – Chris Carpenter 50-yard punt return (Chase Allen kick), 8:01. Roadrunners 24–7.
- UTSA – Rocko Griffin 1-yard run (Chase Allen kick), 3:24. Roadrunners 31–7. Drive: 5 plays, 52 yards, 2:08.

Fourth quarter

- UTSA – Tate Sandell 47-yard field goal, 5:09. Roadrunners 34–7. Drive: 5 plays, 15 yards, 2:25.
- RICE – Landon Ransom-Goelz 22-yard pass from A. J. Padgett (Tim Horn kick), 1:11. Roadrunners 34–14. Drive: 9 plays, 75 yards, 3:58.

Statistics

Statistics	RICE	UTSA
First downs	17	23
Total yards	229	381
Rushing yards	47	199
Passing yards	182	182
Turnovers	1	1
Time of possession	29:49	30:11

Team	Category	Player	Statistics
Rice	Passing	A. J. Padgett	17/28, 182 yards, 2 TD
Rice	Rushing	Dean Connors	8 rushes, 34 yards
Rice	Receiving	Luke McCaffrey	6 receptions, 68 yards, TD
UTSA	Passing	Frank Harris	15/24, 175 yards, TD
UTSA	Rushing	Rocko Griffin	12 rushes, 81 yards, TD
UTSA	Receiving	Joshua Cephus	5 receptions, 53 yards, TD

=== South Florida ===
	1	2	3	4	Total
Bulls	7	7	7	0	21
Roadrunners	7	21	14	7	49

=== At No. 23 Tulane ===
UTSA Roadrunners (8–3) vs No. 23 Tulane Green Wave (10–1) – Game summary

Quarter	1	2	3	4	Total
Roadrunners	7	3	0	6	16
No. 23 Green Wave	7	16	0	6	29

at Yulman Stadium, New Orleans, LA

- Date: November 24, 2023
- Game time: 2:30 p.m. CDT
- Game weather: Cloudy • Temperature: 59 °F (15 °C) • Wind: NE 7 mph
- Game attendance: 25,103
- Referee: Luke Richmond
- TV: ABC

Game information

First Quarter

- (13:47) TUL – Chris Brazzell II 7-yard pass from Michael Pratt, Valentino Ambrosio kick (Drive: 3 plays, 10 yards, 0:45; Tulane 7–0)
- (9:22) UTSA – Rocko Griffin 23-yard run, Chase Allen kick (Drive: 3 plays, 30 yards, 0:55; Tied 7–7)

Second Quarter

- (14:08) UTSA – Chase Allen 40-yard field goal (Drive: 8 plays, 34 yards, 2:58; UTSA 10–7)
- (11:53) TUL – Valentino Ambrosio 47-yard field goal (Drive: 6 plays, 46 yards, 2:15; Tied 10–10)
- (5:40) TUL – Valentino Ambrosio 26-yard field goal (Drive: 6 plays, 68 yards, 3:17; Tulane 13–10)
- (3:27) TUL – Mahki Hughes 2-yard run, Valentino Ambrosio kick (Drive: 5 plays, 48 yards, 1:32; Tulane 20–10)
- (0:00) TUL – Valentino Ambrosio 23-yard field goal (Drive: 8 plays, 38 yards, 1:50; Tulane 23–10)

Third Quarter

No scoring

Fourth Quarter

- (5:18) TUL – Chris Brazzell II 3-yard pass from Michael Pratt (Drive: 5 plays, 32 yards, 2:08; Tulane 29–10)
- (1:33) UTSA – Oscar Cardenas 9-yard pass from Frank Harris (Drive: 14 plays, 75 yards, 3:45; Tulane 29–16)

Statistics	UTSA	TUL
First downs	21	13
Total yards	375	352
Rushing yards	177	227
Passing yards	198	125
Turnovers	5	1
Time of possession	31:42	28:18

Team	Category	Player	Statistics
UTSA	Passing	Frank Harris	25/38, 198 yards, TD, 2 INT
UTSA	Rushing	Kevorian Barnes	12 carries, 92 yards
UTSA	Receiving	Joshua Cephus	6 receptions, 83 yards
Tulane	Passing	Michael Pratt	9/22, 125 yards, 2 TD
Tulane	Rushing	Makhi Hughes	26 carries, 166 yards, TD
Tulane	Receiving	Chris Brazzell II	5 receptions, 93 yards, 2 TD

=== vs Marshall (Frisco Bowl) ===
2023 Scooter's Coffee Frisco Bowl – UTSA Roadrunners (8–4) vs. Marshall Thundering Herd (6–6)

Quarter	1	2	3	4	Total
UTSA	0	21	7	7	35
Marshall	7	10	0	0	17

at Toyota Stadium • Frisco, Texas

- Date: Saturday, December 19, 2023
- Game time: 8:00 p.m. CST
- Game weather: Clear • Temperature: 50 °F (10 °C) • Wind: 11 mph (18 km/h) SE
- Game attendance: 11,215
- Referee: Rodney Burnette
- TV announcers (ESPN): Jorge Sedano (play-by-play), Rocky Boiman (analyst), and Dawn Davenport (sideline)
- Box score

Game information

First Quarter

- (8:52) MU – Ethan Payne 1 yard run, Rece Verhoff kick (Drive: 2 plays, 7 yards, 0:22; Marshall 7–0)

Second Quarter

- (14:48) MU – Rasheen Ali 64 yard run, Rece Verhoff kick (Drive: 3 plays, 73 yards, 1:12; Marshall 14–0)
- (11:26) UTSA – Robert Henry Jr. 3 yard run, Chase Allen kick (Drive: 8 plays, 62 yards, 3:22; Marshall 14–7)
- (8:53) UTSA – Joshua Cephus 44 yard pass from Owen McCown, Chase Allen kick (Drive: 4 plays, 65 yards, 1:18; Tied 14–14)
- (5:12) MU – Rece Verhoff 44 yard field goal (Drive: 6 plays, 49 yards, 3:41; Marshall 17–14)
- (0:47) UTSA – Robert Henry 1 yard run, Chase Allen kick (Drive: 13 plays, 75 yards, 4:25; UTSA 21–17)

Third Quarter

- (4:49) UTSA – David Amador 19 yard pass from Owen McCown, Chase Allen kick (Drive: 10 plays, 63 yards, 3:59; UTSA 28–17)

Fourth Quarter

- (8:39) UTSA – Rocko Griffin 17 yard run, Chase Allen kick (Drive: 1 play, 17 yards, 0:07; UTSA 35–17)

Statistics	UTSA	MRSH
First downs	20	13
Plays–yards	72–386	68–367
Rushes–yards	41–135	34–109
Passing yards	251	258
Passing: comp–att–int	22–31–2	15–34–1
Turnovers		
Time of possession	29:59	30:01

Team	Category	Player	Statistics
UTSA	Passing	Owen McCown	22/31, 251 yards, 2 TD, 2 INT
UTSA	Rushing	Rocko Griffin	11 carries, 43 yards, TD
UTSA	Receiving	Joshua Cephus	7 receptions, 102 yards, TD
Marshall	Passing	Cole Pennington	15/33, 258 yards
Marshall	Rushing	Rasheen Ali	9 carries, 92 yards, TD
Marshall	Receiving	Jayden Harrison	6 receptions, 132 yards

== Rankings ==
Ranking movements Legend: ██ Increase in ranking ██ Decrease in ranking — = Not ranked RV = Received votes
	Week															
Poll	Pre	1	2	3	4	5	6	7	8	9	10	11	12	13	14	Final
AP	RV	—	—	—	—	—	—	—	—	—	—	—	—	—	—	RV
Coaches	RV	RV	—	—	—	—	—	—	—	—	—	—	RV	—	—	RV
CFP	Not released									—	—	—	—	—	—	Not released
