= 2026 UTSA Roadrunners football team =

American college football season

2026 UTSA Roadrunners football
- Conference: American Conference
- Record: 9–2 (6–1 American)
- Head coach: Jeff Traylor (7th season)
- Offensive coordinator: Rick Bowie (1st season)
- Offensive scheme: Up-tempo spread
- Defensive coordinator: Jess Loepp (6th season)
- Base defense: 3–4
- Home stadium: Alamodome

2026 American Conference football standings
	Conf.			Overall
Team	W		L	W		L
UTSA	6	–	1	9	–	2
Memphis	5	–	2	8	–	3
East Carolina	5	–	2	7	–	4
North Texas	5	–	2	7	–	4
UAB	4	–	3	6	–	5
Army	4	–	3	5	–	5
Tulsa	4	–	3	7	–	4
Florida Atlantic	4	–	3	7	–	4
Tulane	4	–	3	6	–	5
Navy	3	–	4	4	–	6
South Florida	2	–	5	6	–	5
Rice	1	–	6	2	–	9
Charlotte	1	–	6	1	–	10
Temple	1	–	6	2	–	9
Championship: December 5, 2026
As of November 22, 2026; Rankings from AP poll

The 2026 UTSA Roadrunners football team represents the University of Texas at San Antonio (UTSA) as a member of the American Conference during the 2026 NCAA Division I FBS football season. Led by seventh-year head coach Jeff Traylor, the Roadrunners play their home games at the Alamodome in San Antonio.

== Schedule ==
Date	Time	Opponent	Site	TV	Result	Attendance
September 5	2:30 p.m.	UT Rio Grande Valley*	Alamodome; San Antonio, TX	ESPN+	W 45–16	33,403
September 12	2:30 p.m.	at Texas State*	UFCU Stadium; San Marcos, TX (I-35 Rivalry)	The CW	W 31–26	22,019
September 19	7:00 p.m.	at No. 1 Texas*	Darrell K Royal–Texas Memorial Stadium; Austin, TX	SECN+	L 6–30	103,753
September 26	11:00 a.m.	Colorado State*	Alamodome; San Antonio, TX	ESPNU	W 59–45	17,109
October 3	6:00 p.m.	at Rice	First Community Stadium; Houston, TX	ESPN+	W 16–14	16,739
October 8	6:30 p.m.	South Florida	Alamodome; San Antonio, TX	ESPN	W 31–24	17,632
October 17	7:00 p.m.	Navy	Alamodome; San Antonio, TX	ESPNU	W 38–34	23,297
October 24	7:00 p.m.	at Tulane	Yulman Stadium; New Orleans, LA	ESPNU	W 42–19	19,015
November 5	7:00 p.m.	at Florida Atlantic	Flagler Credit Union Stadium; Boca Raton, FL	ESPN	L 29–60	19,115
November 14	8:00 p.m.	North Texas^{†}	Alamodome; San Antonio, TX	ESPNU	W 35–16	25,151
November 21	7:00 p.m.	at UAB	Protective Stadium; Birmingham, AL	ESPNU	W 19–17	17,176
November 27	11:00 a.m.	Tulsa	Alamodome; San Antonio, TX	ESPN		
*Non-conference game; ^{†}Homecoming; Rankings from AP Poll (and CFP Rankings, after November 3) – Released prior to game; All times are in Central time

== Game summaries ==
=== UT Rio Grande Valley (FCS) ===
UT Rio Grande Valley Vaqueros (1–0) at UTSA Roadrunners (0–0) – Game summary

Quarter	1	2	3	4	Total
Vaqueros (FCS)	0	6	0	10	16
Roadrunners	7	24	0	14	45

at Alamodome • San Antonio, Texas

- Date: September 5
- Game time: 2:30 p.m. CDT
- Game weather: none (played indoors)
- Game attendance: 33,403
- Referee: Cory Hanson
- TV announcers (ESPN+): David Saltzmann and Brad Hopkins

Game information

First quarter

- UTSA – AJ Wilson Jr. 36-yard pass from Owen McCown (Michael Petro kick), 6:51. Roadrunners 7–0. Drive: 8 plays, 80 yards, 3:22.

Second quarter

- UTSA – Brandon Young Jr. 7-yard pass from Owen McCown (Michael Petro kick), 13:16. Roadrunners 14–0. Drive: 7 plays, 43 yards, 2:21.
- UTSA – Ahamad Chapman 49-yard interception return (Michael Petro kick), 12:40. Roadrunners 21–0.
- RGV – Brysen Gardner 44-yard field goal, 7:11. Roadrunners 21–3. Drive: 13 plays, 68 yards, 5:23.
- UTSA – Will Henderson III 75-yard run (Michael Petro kick), 7:00. Roadrunners 28–3. Drive: 1 play, 75 yards, 0:11.
- UTSA – Michael Petro 30-yard field goal, 0:54. Roadrunners 31–3. Drive: 7 plays, 49 yards, 2:40.
- RGV – Brysen Gardner 24-yard field goal, 0:00. Roadrunners 31–6. Drive: 8 plays, 65 yards, 0:54.

Third quarter

- No scoring plays.

Fourth quarter

- UTSA – DJ Allen Jr. 62-yard pass from Owen McCown (Michael Petro kick), 10:41. Roadrunners 38–6. Drive: 2 plays, 61 yards, 0:45.
- RGV – Brysen Gardner 40-yard field goal, 6:15. Roadrunners 38–9. Drive: 8 plays, 47 yards, 3:28.
- UTSA – A'Marion Peterson 53-yard run (Michael Petro kick), 2:56. Roadrunners 45–9. Drive: 5 plays, 83 yards, 3:14.
- RGV – Atzel Chavez Jr. 1-yard run (Brysen Gardner kick), 0:04. Roadrunners 45–16. Drive: 9 plays, 74 yards, 2:44.

Statistics	RGV	UTSA
First downs	22	23
Plays–yards	81–422	58–527
Rushes–yards	34–177	29–252
Passing yards	245	275
Passing: comp–att–int	26–47–2	22–29–0
Turnovers	2	0
Time of possession	34:49	25:11

Team	Category	Player	Statistics
UT Rio Grande Valley	Passing	Garret Rangel	19/32, 152 yards
UT Rio Grande Valley	Rushing	Broderick Taylor	6 carries, 73 yards
UT Rio Grande Valley	Receiving	Jaydon Smith	2 receptions, 68 yards
UTSA	Passing	Owen McCown	22/27, 275 yards, 3 TD
UTSA	Rushing	Will Henderson III	9 carries, 101 yards, TD
UTSA	Receiving	DJ Allen Jr.	3 receptions, 116 yards, TD

=== at Texas State (I–35 Rivalry) ===
UTSA Roadrunners (1–0) at Texas State Bobcats (0–1) – Game summary

Quarter	1	2	3	4	Total
Roadrunners	7	0	10	14	31
Bobcats	0	17	6	3	26

at UFCU Stadium • San Marcos, Texas

- Date: September 12
- Game time: 2:30 p.m. CDT
- Game weather: Sunny
- Game attendance: 22,019
- Referee: John Love
- TV announcers (The CW): Rick Allen, Will Blackmon and Michael Bumpus

Game information

First quarter

- (4:54) UTSA - Brandon Young Jr. 1-yard pass from Owen McCown (Michael Petro kick), (Drive: 11 plays, 48 yards, 5:06; UTSA 7-0)

Second quarter

- (13:09) TXST - Davian Jackson 16-yard run (Jacob Bonilla kick), (Drive: 2 plays, 81 yards, 0:33; Tied 7-7)
- (7:16) TXST - Brad Jackson 6-yard run (Jacob Bonilla kick), (Drive: 8 plays, 49 yards, 2:32; Texas State 14-7)
- (0:00) TXST - Jacob Bonilla 51-yard field goal, (Drive: 10 plays, 47 yards, 2:14; Texas State 17-7)

Third quarter

- (13:01) UTSA - Mekhi Anderson 44-yard pass from David Amador II (Michael Petro kick), (Drive: 6 plays, 75 yards, 1:59; Texas State 17-14)
- (7:46) UTSA - Michael Petro 34-yard field goal, (Drive: 7 plays, 22 yards, 2:15; Tied 17-17)
- (0:00) TXST - Chris Dawn Jr. 13-yard pass from Brad Jackson (Dylan Cunanan PAT failed), (Drive: 7 plays, 60 yards, 2:37; Texas State 23-17)

Fourth quarter

- (11:54) UTSA - A'Marion Peterson 2-yard run (Michael Petro kick), (Drive: 7 plays, 65 yards, 3:00; UTSA 24-23)
- (4:36) TXST - Jacob Bonilla 26-yard field goal, (Drive: 14 plays, 67 yards, 7:18; Texas State 26-24)
- (0:14) UTSA - Brandon High Jr. 25-yard run (Michael Petro kick), (Drive: 14 plays, 82 yards, 4:17; UTSA 31-26)

Statistics	UTSA	TXST
First downs	22	27
Plays–yards	74–398	80–481
Rushes–yards	31–140	50–289
Passing yards	258	192
Passing: Comp–Att–Int	29–43–0	17–30–2
Turnovers	0	3
Time of possession	28:20	31:40

Team	Category	Player	Statistics
UTSA	Passing	Owen McCown	28/42, 214 yards, TD
UTSA	Rushing	Will Henderson III	14 carries, 80 yards
UTSA	Receiving	Mekhi Anderson	5 receptions, 83 yards, TD
Texas State	Passing	Brad Jackson	17/30, 192 yards, TD, 2 INT
Texas State	Rushing	Torrance Burgess Jr.	17 carries, 149 yards
Texas State	Receiving	Kylen Evans	5 receptions, 96 yards

=== at No. 1 Texas ===
UTSA Roadrunners (2–0) at No. 1 Texas Longhorns (2–0) – Game summary

Quarter	1	2	3	4	Total
Roadrunners	3	0	3	0	6
No. 1 Longhorns	10	10	3	7	30

at Darrell K Royal–Texas Memorial Stadium • Austin, Texas

- Date: September 19
- Game time: 7:00 p.m. CDT
- Game weather: Sunny
- Game attendance: 103,753
- Referee: Daniel Gautreaux
- TV announcers (SECN+): Clay Matvick, Rocky Boiman and Austyn Iven

Game information

First quarter

- (13:34) TEX - Cam Coleman 24-yard pass from Arch Manning (Gianni Spetic kick), (Drive: 4 plays, 37 yards, 1:17; Texas 7-0)
- (7:05) UTSA - Michael Petro 34-yard field goal (Drive: 13 plays, 59 yards, 6:29; Texas 7-3)
- (7:05) TEX - Gianni Spetic 52-yard field goal (Drive: 13 plays, 50 yards, 5:35; Texas 10-3)

Second quarter

- (11:26) TEX - Cam Coleman 3-yard pass from Arch Manning (Gianni Spetic kick), (Drive: 7 plays, 57 yards, 3:19; Texas 17-3)
- (0:10) TEX - Gianni Spetic 34-yard field goal (Drive: 8 plays, 36 yards, 1:23; Texas 20-3)

Third quarter

- (12:44) UTSA - Brayden Doane 43-yard field goal (Drive: 5 plays, 10 yards, 0:56; Texas 20-6)
- (6:07) TEX - Gianni Spetic 23-yard field goal (Drive: 9 plays, 34 yards, 3:18; Texas 23-6)

Fourth quarter

- (8:57) TEX - Derrek Cooper 1-yard run (Gianni Spetic kick), (Drive: 8 plays, 66 yards, 3:58; Texas 30-6)

Statistics	UTSA	TEX
First downs	9	27
Plays–yards	47-142	83-400
Rushes–yards	24-72	48-228
Passing yards	23-70	35-172
Passing: comp–att–int	14-23-1	18-35-0
Time of possession	22:59	36:51

Team	Category	Player	Statistics
UTSA	Passing	Owen McCown	14/23, 70 yards, INT
UTSA	Rushing	Will Henderson III	10 carries, 48 yards
UTSA	Receiving	Brandon High Jr.	3 receptions, 20 yards
Texas	Passing	Arch Manning	17/33, 164 yards, 2 TD
Texas	Rushing	Arch Manning	9 carries, 63 yards
Texas	Receiving	Cam Coleman	4 receptions, 59 yards, 2 TD

=== Colorado State ===
Colorado State Rams (2–1) at UTSA Roadrunners (2–1) – Game summary

Quarter	1	2	3	4	Total
Rams	14	7	14	10	45
Roadrunners	21	14	7	17	59

at Alamodome • San Antonio, Texas

- Date: September 26
- Game time: 11:00 a.m. CDT
- Game weather: Indoor
- Game attendance: 17,109
- Referee: Charles Lamertina
- TV announcers (ESPNU): Mike Corey and Craig Haubert

Game information

First quarter

- CSU - Mel Brown 94-yard kickoff return (Kali Nguma kick), 14:48. Rams 7-0. Drive: 0 plays, 0 yards, 0:00.
- CSU - Terrence Smith Jr. 74-yard pass from K'saan Farrar (Kali Nguma kick), 13:16. Rams 14-0. Drive: 1 play, 74 yards, 0:09.
- UTSA - Brandon High Jr. 16-yard run (Michael Petro kick), 9:03. Rams 14-7. Drive: 12 plays, 75 yards, 4:13.
- UTSA - Will Henderson III 13-yard run (Michael Petro kick), 5:12. Tied 14-14. Drive: 5 plays, 51 yards, 1:54.
- UTSA - David Amador II 27-yard pass from Owen McCown (Michael Petro kick), 2:04. Roadrunners 21-14. Drive: 4 plays, 57 yards, 1:23.

Second quarter

- UTSA - DJ Allen Jr. 58-yard pass from Owen McCown (Michael Petro kick), 13:29. Roadrunners 28-14. Drive: 5 plays, 80 yards, 1:31.
- UTSA - A'Marion Peterson 5-yard run (Michael Petro kick), 6:48. Roadrunners 35-14. Drive: 10 plays, 59 yards, 4:54.
- CSU - Nader Chirchi 5-yard pass from K'saan Farrar (Kali Nguma kick), 1:55. Roadrunners 35-21. Drive: 11 plays, 75 yards, 4:53.

Third quarter

- CSU - Durell Robinson 1-yard run (Kali Nguma kick), 11:40. Roadrunners 35-28. Drive: 5 plays, 66 yards, 1:39.
- UTSA - Mekhi Anderson 100-yard kickoff return (Michael Petro kick), 11:27. Roadrunners 42-28. Drive: 0 plays, 0 yards, 0:00.
- CSU - Durell Robinson 3-yard run (Kali Nguma kick), 4:06. Roadrunners 42-35. Drive: 15 plays, 75 yards, 7:21.

Fourth quarter

- UTSA - Mekhi Anderson 14-yard pass from Owen McCown (Michael Petro kick), 14:14. Roadrunners 49-35. Drive: 10 plays, 71 yards, 4:45.
- CSU - RJ Vick 18-yard run (Kali Nguma kick), 8;55. Roadrunners 49-42. Drive: 10 plays, 76 yards, 5:13.
- UTSA - Michael Petro 46-yard field goal, 4:56. Roadrunners 52-42. Drive: 10 plays, 47 yards, 3:59.
- CSU - Kali Nguma 51-yard field goal, 2:09. Roadrunners 52-45. Drive: 10 plays, 38 yards, 2:47.
- UTSA - A'Marion Peterson 47-yard run (Michael Petro kick), 2:00. Roadrunners 59-45. Drive: 1 play, 47 yards, 0:08.

Statistics	CSU	UTSA
First downs	21	25
Plays–yards	72–500	78–542
Rushes–yards	32–156	42–239
Passing yards	344	303
Passing: comp–att–int	29–46–1	20–30–0
Time of possession	31:17	28:43

Team	Category	Player	Statistics
Colorado State	Passing	K'saan Farrar	29/46, 344 yards, 2 TD, INT
Colorado State	Rushing	Mel Brown	12 carries, 90 yards
Colorado State	Receiving	Terrence Smith Jr.	6 receptions, 102 yards, TD
UTSA	Passing	Owen McCown	20/20, 303 yards, 3 TD
UTSA	Rushing	Will Henderson III	14 carries, 89 yards, TD
UTSA	Receiving	DJ Allen Jr.	5 receptions, 87 yards, TD

=== at Rice ===
UTSA Roadrunners (3–1) at Rice Owls (1–3) – Game summary

Quarter	1	2	3	4	Total
Roadrunners	6	10	0	0	16
Owls	7	0	0	7	14

at First Community Stadium • Houston, Texas

- Date: October 3
- Game time: 6:00 p.m. CDT
- Game weather: Cloudy
- Game attendance: 16,739
- Referee: Matt Overton
- TV announcers (ESPN+): David Saltzman (play-by-play), Patrick Murray (analyst), and Smacker Miles (sideline reporter)

Statistics	UTSA	RICE
First downs	20	12
Plays–yards	72-304	60-232
Rushes–yards	43-166	46-144
Passing yards	138	88
Passing: comp–att–int	19-29-1	6--14
Time of possession	32:06	27:54

Team	Category	Player	Statistics
UTSA	Passing	Owen McCown	19/29 148 yards 1 INT
UTSA	Rushing	Will Henderson III	18 carries 90 yards 1 TD
UTSA	Receiving	David Amador II	7 catches 48 yards
Rice	Passing	Jacurri Brown	6/14 88 yards
Rice	Rushing	Jacurri Brown	17 carries 98 yards 1 TD
Rice	Receiving	Ben Grice	1 catch 40 yards

=== South Florida ===
South Florida Bulls (4–1) at UTSA Roadrunners (4–1) – Game summary

Quarter	1	2	3	4	Total
Bulls	14	3	0	7	24
Roadrunners	7	3	10	11	31

at Alamodome • San Antonio, Texas

- Date: October 8
- Game time: 6:30 p.m. CDT
- Game weather: None (indoors)
- Game attendance: 17,632
- Referee: Tim Rich
- TV announcers (ESPN): Matt Barrie (play-by-play), Chase Daniel (analyst), and Paul Carcaterra (sideline)

Statistics	USF	UTSA
First downs	19	25
Plays–yards	61-288	75-486
Rushes–yards	31-123	43-291
Passing yards	177	209
Passing: comp–att–int	16-30-0	22-32-0
Time of possession	27:35	32:25

Team	Category	Player	Statistics
South Florida	Passing	Michael Van Buren Jr.	16/29, 177 yards, 2 TD
South Florida	Rushing	D.J. Crowther	20 carries, 89 yards, TD
South Florida	Receiving	Bryson Rodgers	5 receptions, 72 yards, TD
UTSA	Passing	Owen McCown	22/31, 209 yards
UTSA	Rushing	A'Marion Peterson	12 carries, 92 yards, 3 TD
UTSA	Receiving	David Amador II	9 receptions, 70 yards

=== Navy ===
Navy Midshipmen (2–3) at UTSA Roadrunners (5–1) – Game summary

Quarter	1	2	3	4	Total
Midshipmen	7	13	0	14	34
Roadrunners	0	21	3	14	38

at Alamodome • San Antonio, Texas

- Date: October 17
- Game time: 7:00 p.m CDT
- Game weather: none (iindoors)
- Referee: Kevin Randall
- TV announcers (ESPNU): Ted Emrich (play-by-play) and Fozzy Whittaker (analyst).

Statistics	NAVY	UTSA
First downs		
Plays–yards		
Rushes–yards		
Passing yards		
Passing: comp–att–int		
Time of possession		

Team	Category	Player	Statistics
Navy	Passing		
Navy	Rushing		
Navy	Receiving		
UTSA	Passing		
UTSA	Rushing		
UTSA	Receiving		

=== at Tulane ===
UTSA Roadrunners (6–1) at Tulane Green Wave (3–3) – Game summary

Quarter	1	2	3	4	Total
Roadrunners	14	7	14	7	42
Green Wave	7	6	0	6	19

at Yulman Stadium • New Orleans, Louisiana

- Date: October 24
- Game time: 705 pm
- Game weather: Sunny
- Game attendance: 19,015
- Referee: Charlie Lamertina
- TV announcers (ESPNU): Ted Emrich (play-by-play) and Fozzy Whittaker (analyst)

Statistics	UTSA	TULN
First downs		
Plays–yards		
Rushes–yards		
Passing yards		
Passing: comp–att–int		
Time of possession		

Team	Category	Player	Statistics
UTSA	Passing		
UTSA	Rushing		
UTSA	Receiving		
Tulane	Passing		
Tulane	Rushing		
Tulane	Receiving		

=== at Florida Atlantic ===
UTSA Roadrunners (7–1) at Florida Atlantic Owls (5–3) – Game summary

Quarter	1	2	3	4	Total
Roadrunners	7	15	7	0	29
Owls	21	14	15	10	60

at Flagler Credit Union Stadium • Boca Raton, Florida

- Date: November 5
- Game time: 7:00 p.m. CST
- TV: ESPN/ESPN2

Statistics	UTSA	FAU
First downs		
Plays–yards		
Rushes–yards		
Passing yards		
Passing: comp–att–int		
Time of possession		

Team	Category	Player	Statistics
UTSA	Passing		
UTSA	Rushing		
UTSA	Receiving		
Florida Atlantic	Passing		
Florida Atlantic	Rushing		
Florida Atlantic	Receiving		

=== North Texas ===
North Texas Mean Green (7–2) at UTSA Roadrunners (7–2) – Game summary

Quarter	1	2	3	4	Total
Mean Green	0	3	7	6	16
Roadrunners	7	14	0	14	35

at Alamodome • San Antonio, Texas

- Date: November 14
- Game time: TBD
- TV announcers (ESPNU): Richard Cross and Fozzy Whittaker

Statistics	UNT	UTSA
First downs		
Plays–yards		
Rushes–yards		
Passing yards		
Passing: comp–att–int		
Time of possession		

Team	Category	Player	Statistics
North Texas	Passing		
North Texas	Rushing		
North Texas	Receiving		
UTSA	Passing		
UTSA	Rushing		
UTSA	Receiving		

=== at UAB ===
UTSA Roadrunners (8–2) at UAB Blazers (6–4) – Game summary

Quarter	1	2	3	4	Total
Roadrunners	0	14	3	2	19
Blazers	0	14	0	3	17

at Protective Stadium • Birmingham, Alabama

- Date: November 21
- Game time: TBD

Statistics	UTSA	UAB
First downs		
Plays–yards		
Rushes–yards		
Passing yards		
Passing: comp–att–int		
Time of possession		

Team	Category	Player	Statistics
UTSA	Passing		
UTSA	Rushing		
UTSA	Receiving		
UAB	Passing		
UAB	Rushing		
UAB	Receiving		

=== Tulsa ===
Tulsa Golden Hurricane (7–4) at UTSA Roadrunners (9–2) – Game summary

Quarter	1	2	Total
Golden Hurricane			0
Roadrunners			0

at Alamodome • San Antonio, Texas

- Date: November 28
- Game time: TBD

Statistics	TLSA	UTSA
First downs		
Plays–yards		
Rushes–yards		
Passing yards		
Passing: comp–att–int		
Time of possession		

Team	Category	Player	Statistics
Tulsa	Passing		
Tulsa	Rushing		
Tulsa	Receiving		
UTSA	Passing		
UTSA	Rushing		
UTSA	Receiving		

== Roster ==
2026 UTSA Roadrunners football team roster
Players
Coaches
Offense

Pos.	#	Name	Class
WR	0	David Amador II	RJr
RB	1	Will Henderson III	RSo
QB	2	Owen McCown	RSr
WR	4	Mekhi Anderson	RSo
RB	7	Brandon High Jr.	RJr
QB	11	Brandon Tennison	RJr
QB	12	Max Gerlich	RFr
WR	13	Jamel Hardy Jr.	RJr
WR	15	DJ Allen Jr.	RSr
QB	16	Maguire Gasperson	Fr
WR	17	James Madison II	RSo
QB	18	Mark Wiepert	RFr
WR	19	TJ West	RJr
RB	21	JC Solitaire	Sr
RB	22	Bryson Donnell	RSr
RB	23	Mykha Green	Fr
WR	24	Mekhi Rice	Sr
RB	25	Frankie Arthur Jr.	RSo
WR	26	Tangoh Njoh	RSo
RB	28	A'Marion Peterson	RJr
WR	31	Caleb Garcia	Sr
WR	33	Cael Meisman	Jr
RB	37	Londen Bickham	Fr
RB	38	TJ Andrews	RSo
RB	42	Mason Culton	RJr
OL	50	Payton Williams	Fr
OL	52	Preston Huneycutt	RSo
OL	53	Sekope Wallace	Jr
OL	55	MJ Senegal	RJr
OL	57	Ben Rios	RSr
OL	59	Joseph Ugwu Jr.	RSo
OL	65	Jarrett Henry	RJr
OL	66	Davion Hurth	RSo
OL	68	Josiah Evans	Fr
OL	69	Eucebio Ramos	RSr
OL	70	Deandre Marshall	RSr
OL	71	Jaylen Garth	RSr
OL	72	Ibrahim "EB" Kebe	RFr
OL	73	A'marion Breland	RFr
OL	74	Darrell Jones	Sr
OL	75	Jonah Miller	RSr
OL	76	Luke Lapeze	RSr
OL	77	Devron Williams Jr.	RSo
OL	79	Daniel Simpson	Fr
WR	80	Wyatt Smiley	RFr
TE	81	Miles Campbell	RSr
WR	82	Prince Hall	Fr
TE	83	Will Traylor	Fr
WR	84	AJ Wilson	Sr
TE	85	Ty Rupe	RFr
TE	86	Isaiah Butler-Tanner	RFr
WR	87	Chris Dupree	Fr
TE	88	Trysten Laughlin	Fr
TE	89	Brandon Young Jr.	Jr

Defense

Pos.	#	Name	Class
DL	0	Jeremiah Bailey	RSr
OLB	1	Camron Cooper	RJr
LB	2	Owen Pewee	RSr
CB	3	RJ Lester Jr.	RSo
LB	4	Brandon Tucker	RSr
LB	5	Darion White	RSr
DL	6	Jusiah Sampleton	Sr
CB	7	Ahamad Chapman	RSo
CB	8	Asaad Chapman	Jr
DL	9	Jameian Buxton	Sr
CB	10	Lawrence Brown Jr.	RJr
S	11	Cameron Upshaw Jr.	RJr
S	12	Marcellus Wilkerson	RSr
S	14	Joel Rogers	RSo
LB	16	Chris Bryson II	RJr
DL	19	Johnny Bowens III	RSo
CB	20	Zach Morris	RSr
S	21	Jarvse "Duece" Dickerson	Fr
S	22	Elijah Newell	RSo
LB	24	Willie Nelson III	RSo
S	25	Nate Robinson Jr.	Jr
LB	26	Bryce Grays	RSr
CB	27	Jakevian Rodgers	RJr
CB	28	Louie Hogan	Sr
S	29	Xavier Walton	Sr
LB	30	Bobby Brown	Fr
OLB	31	Dylan Spencer	RSo
OLB	32	Elijah Baldwin	RSo
LB	34	James Walley Jr.	RJr
S	35	Ben Brewer	RSo
OLB	36	TJ Laurent	Jr
S	37	Tristan Escobar	RFr
CB	40	Baylor Smith	Fr
LB	41	Nathaniel Ortega	So
LB	42	Lane Rogers	Fr
DL	44	Collins Acheampong	RSo
DL	47	Tim Huff Jr.	RSr
DL	48	Jacob Lopez-Veasey	Fr
DL	49	Hudson Pickett	Fr
LB	50	Michael Owoeye	RSr
LB	51	Aden Hall	Fr
LB	53	Eze Osondu	RSo
LB	54	Jamarri Vinson	So
LB	55	Amare Johnson	RJr
OLB	56	Caleb Barrow	Fr
LB	57	Tysan Breaux	Fr
LB	58	Braeden Lott	Fr
OLB	59	Cole Ramseur	Sr
DL	88	Byron Porter	So
DL	90	Donald "DJ" Quaite Jr.	RJr
DL	92	Jaylan Jones	RSo
DL	94	Eddy Smith	RSo
DL	95	Drenon Fite III	RSr
DL	96	Corey Walls	RFr
DL	97	King Justice	RFr
DL	99	Tai Leonard	RSr

Special teams

Pos.	#	Name	Class
PK	3	Michael Petro	RJr
P	30	Caile Hogan	Jr
PK	32	Jason Cardenas	Fr
PK	46	Braydon Doane	Fr
LS	60	William Hodges	Jr
LS	67	Jon Stephens III	RFr
PK	98	Jesse Perez	RFr

Head coach

- Jeff Traylor

Coordinators/assistant coaches

- Jess Loepp – Defensive Coordinator/Safeties
- Rick Bowie – Offensive Coordinator
- Kurt Traylor – Run Game Coordinator/Offensive Line
- Nick Graham – Assistant Head Coach/Cornerbacks
- Zach Brown – Special Teams Coordinator/Nickels
- Hunter Rittimann – Associate Head Coach for Offense/Tight Ends
- Tommie Robinson – Running Backs
- Galen Scott – Defensive Pass Game Coordinator/Linebackers
- DeNarius McGhee – Wide Receivers
- Jermial Ashley – Defensive Line
- Dr. Pavit Patel – Pass Game Specialist/Quarterbacks Coach
- Tim Yoder – Assistant Tight Ends & Running Backs Coach/Game Management Coordinator
- Malik Walker – Safeties Coach
- Chris Nelson – Defensive Tackles Coach
- Colyn Givens – Outside Linebackers Coach
- Cordale Grundy – Assistant Wide Receivers Coach
- Eyan Means – Assistant Wide Receivers Coach
- John Cotton – Specialists Coach/Assistant Special Teams Coordinator
- Marcus Alexander – Graduate Assistant (Offense)
- Eli Henderson – Graduate Assistant (Offense)
- Dayven Coleman – Graduate Assistant (Defense)
- Jack Swensen – Graduate Assistant (Defense)
- Mike Giglio – General Manager
- Andrew Acosta – Director of Football Operations
- Parker Cundiff – Assistant General Manager/Player Personnel/NFL Liaison
- Mia Rincon – Director of Recruiting
- Damon Williams – Director of Football Relations and Player Engagement
- Shawn Lewis – Player Development Coordinator
- Alexis Dawson – Administrative Associate
- Alex Nicasio – Football Video Coordinator
- Jeremiah Bledsoe – Production Assistant
- Allison Maguire – Football Creative Coordinator
- Christopher Taleghani – Graphics Designer
- Jared Ka'aiohelo – Director of Sports Performance for Football
- Reese Vogel – Senior Associate Director, Sports Performance
- Miguel Compean – Assistant Sports Performance Coach
- Zachary Hill – Assistant Sports Performance Coach
- Jamie Tago – Assistant Sports Performance Coach
- Connor Coker – Assistant AD/Equipment Operations
- Georgia Davidson-Erwin – Assistant Equipment Manager
- Brian Benitez – Associate Director / Head Football Trainer
- Justine Humphrey – Assistant Athletic Trainer/Football
- Randi Hollie – Assistant Athletic Trainer
- Amber Del-Moral – Resident Athletic Trainer
- Ariel Sauseda – Resident Athletic Trainer

Legend

- (C) Team captain
- (S) Suspended
- (I) Ineligible
- Injured
- Redshirt

Roster
