= Rashad Wisdom =

American football player (born 2001)

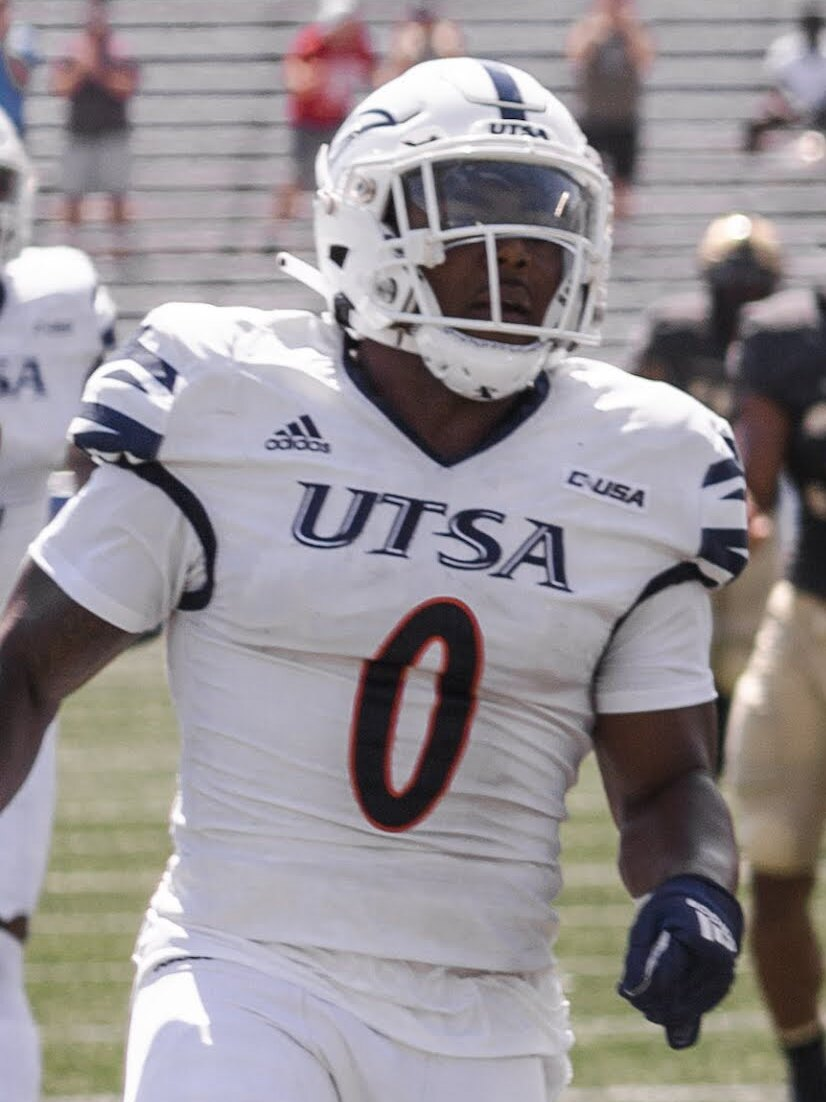
- Wisdom with UTSA in 2022

Profile
- Position: Safety

Personal information
- Born: June 6, 2001 (age 25)
- Listed height: 5 ft 9 in (1.75 m)
- Listed weight: 210 lb (95 kg)

Career information
- High school: Judson (Converse, Texas)
- College: UTSA (2019–2023)
- NFL draft: 2024: undrafted

Career history
- Tampa Bay Buccaneers (2024–2026)

Career NFL statistics as of 2025
- Total tackles: 3
- Fumble recoveries: 1
- Stats at Pro Football Reference

Rashad Wisdom (born June 6, 2001) is an American professional football safety. He played college football for the UTSA Roadrunners and was signed by the Buccaneers as an undrafted free agent in 2024.

== Early life ==
Wisdom was born on June 6, 2001, and grew up in Converse, Texas. He grew up playing football as a running back before switching to safety while attending Judson High School. He was named first-team all-district as a sophomore, junior and senior while being named honorable mention all-state in his last two years. He concluded his stint at Judson having totaled 218 tackles, seven interceptions, 14 pass breakups and four fumble recoveries. He committed to play college football for the UTSA Roadrunners.

== College career ==
As a freshman at UTSA in 2019, Wisdom started 12 games and recorded 44 tackles, being named to the Conference USA All-Freshman team. In 2020, he was named first-team All-Conference USA after leading the team with 95 tackles and tying for the school record with four interceptions. He started 13 of 14 games in 21, repeating as a first-team all-conference selection while recording a team-leading 88 tackles. In 2022, he appeared in six games, missing the rest due to injury, and posted 27 tackles. He then started 13 games in his last year, 2023, tallying 61 tackles and five pass breakups. Wisdom concluded his collegiate career having appeared in 57 games and made a UTSA-record 315 tackles.

== Professional career ==
Pre-draft measurables
Height	Weight	Arm length	Hand span	Wingspan	40-yard dash	10-yard split	20-yard split	20-yard shuttle	Three-cone drill	Vertical jump	Broad jump
5 ft 8 5/8 in (1.74 m)	203 lb (92 kg)	29 in (0.74 m)	9 1/4 in (0.23 m)	5 ft 10 1/2 in (1.79 m)	4.50 s	1.52 s	2.59 s	4.11 s	6.89 s	37.0 in (0.94 m)	9 ft 10 in (3.00 m)
All values from Pro Day

After going unselected in the 2024 NFL draft, Wisdom signed with the Tampa Bay Buccaneers as an undrafted free agent. He was waived on August 27, 2024, before being re-signed to the practice squad two days later.

Wisdom signed a reserve/future contract with Tampa Bay on January 14, 2025. Wisdom made the team's 53-man roster for the 2025 season. On September 30, Wisdom was placed on injured reserve due to a quadriceps injury. He was activated on December 17, ahead of the team's Week 16 matchup against the Carolina Panthers.

On August 30, 2026, Wisdom was waived by the Buccaneers as a part of final roster cuts; he was re-signed to the team's practice squad the following day. Wisdom was released by Tampa Bay on September 2.

== Personal life ==
Wisdom's father, Richard, played for the U.S. national under-16 soccer team. His brother, Bryce, died in 2020 from cancer.
