= Jason Neill =

American gridiron football player (born 1992)

No. 64, 91, 96
- Position: Defensive tackle

Personal information
- Born: October 28, 1992 (age 34); Flower Mound, Texas, U.S.
- Listed height: 6 ft 3 in (1.91 m)
- Listed weight: 277 lb (126 kg)

Career information
- High school: Marcus (TX)
- College: UTSA (2011–2015)
- NFL draft: 2016: undrafted

Career history
- Dallas Cowboys (2016)*; Cleveland Browns (2016)*; Calgary Stampeders (2016)*; Hamilton Tiger-Cats (2017–2018); Tampa Bay Vipers (2020)
- * Offseason or practice squad member only

Awards and highlights
- Second-team All-C-USA (2015)

Career CFL statistics
- Games played: 23
- Tackles: 18
- Quarterback sacks: 0
- Stats at CFL.ca

Jason Andrew Neill (born October 28, 1992) is an American former football defensive tackle in the Canadian Football League (CFL) for the Hamilton Tiger-Cats. He also was a member of the Tampa Bay Vipers in the XFL. He played college football at the University of Texas at San Antonio.

== Early life ==
Neill attended Edward S. Marcus High School. He began playing on the football team as a quarterback. As a junior, he was converted into a defensive lineman, became a starter and received first-team All-District 6-5A honors.

As a senior in 2010, he tallied 66 tackles, 5 sacks and one interception, receiving first-team All-District 8-5A and District 8-5A Defensive Player of the Year honors.

== College career ==
Neill accepted a football scholarship from the University of Texas at San Antonio. As a true freshman in 2011, he appeared in all 10 games with 6 starts at defensive end. He collected 14 tackles (4 for loss), one sack and one interception. He had 6 tackles (2 for loss) and one sack against McNeese State University. He returned an interception 67 yards for a touchdown in the season finale against Minot State University.

As a sophomore in 2012, he appeared in 10 games. He missed 2 contests with an injury. He registered 12 tackles (2 for loss), one sack and 2 passes defensed. He has 4 tackles and one sack against Texas A&M University–Commerce. He made 4 tackles against Northwestern Oklahoma State University.

As a junior in 2013, he received a medical redshirt after suffering a season-ending knee injury in the season opener against the University of New Mexico, where he made a tackle before leaving in the second half.

As a four-year junior in 2014, he appeared in all 12 games with 4 starts, totaling 29 tackles (6.5 for loss), 3.5 sacks (led the team) and 2 forced fumbles. He made 8 tackles and 1.5 sacks against Oklahoma State University.

As a fifth year senior in 2015, he started in all 12 games and tallied 56 tackles. He set single-season school records with 8.5 sacks and 11 tackles for loss. He had 9 tackles (4 for loss) and 2 sacks against the University of North Texas. He made 9 tackles and 2 sacks against Rice University. He finished his college career as the school's All-time leader in sacks (14) and tackles for loss (23.5).

== Professional career ==
=== Dallas Cowboys ===
Neill was signed as an undrafted free agent by the Dallas Cowboys after the 2016 NFL draft on May 6. He was released before the start of training camp on May 24, 2016.

=== Cleveland Browns ===
On July 31, 2016, he signed with the Cleveland Browns as a free agent, with the intention of playing at linebacker. On September 3, 2016, he was released before the start of the season.

=== Calgary Stampeders ===
On September 27, 2016, he was signed to the Calgary Stampeders' practice roster. He was released on October 18, 2016.

=== Hamilton Tiger-Cats ===
On April 18, 2017, he signed with the Hamilton Tiger-Cats. On June 17, 2017, he was added to the practice roster. He appeared in 8 games with 7 starts at defensive tackle, making 6 tackles. In 2018, he started 15 games at defensive tackle, making 12 defensive tackles and 2 special teams tackles.

=== Tampa Bay Vipers ===
On October 15, 2019, Neill was drafted in the 9th round during phase three in the 2020 XFL draft by the Tampa Bay Vipers. He appeared in 4 games with 2 starts at defensive end, making 1.5 tackles. On April 10, 2020, he had his contract terminated when the league suspended operations due to the COVID-19 pandemic.
