= Triston Wade =

American football player (born 1993)

No. 38
- Position: Safety

Personal information
- Born: May 19, 1993 (age 33); Tyler, Texas, U.S.
- Listed height: 6 ft 0 in (1.83 m)
- Listed weight: 170 lb (77 kg)

Career information
- High school: Tyler
- College: UTSA (2011–2014)
- NFL draft: 2015: undrafted

Career history
- Seattle Seahawks (2015)*
- * Offseason or practice squad member only

Awards and highlights
- Second-team All-WAC (2012); Second-team All-C-USA (2013)

Triston Wade (born May 19, 1993) is an American former football safety. He signed with the Seattle Seahawks of the National Football League (NFL) as an undrafted free agent after the 2015 NFL draft. He played college football for UTSA Roadrunners.

== Early life ==
Wade was born on May 19, 1993, in Tyler, Texas. He attended Tyler High School in Tyler, Texas. In 2010 he earned Second-Team Class 4A All-State and First-Team All-East Texas honors after having 122 tackles, six interceptions, and a pair of forced fumbles. He was also named the District 14-4A Defensive Most Valuable Player.

== College career ==
In 2011, Wade's true freshman season, he played in all ten games, earning starts in four of them. He had 39 tackles, two interceptions, and three fumbles forced on the season. In 2012, Wade played and started all twelve games for the Roadrunners. He earned First-Team All-WAC honors after ending the season tied for the team lead with four interceptions. He finished the season with 74 tackles, four interceptions, and eleven pass breakups. In the season opener he forced a fumble on a kickoff return and also had an interception alongside a career-high eleven tackles in the season opener against the South Alabama Jaguars. After that performance he earned WAC Defensive Player of the Week and an honorable mention for the Jim Thorpe Defensive Back of the Week.

In 2013, Wade was voted as a team captain and was named to the Second-Team All-C-USA team. On the year he had 94 total tackles, which is good enough for second in UTSA history, he also had two interceptions and seven pass breakups. He had both of his interceptions in a game against Tulsa, with one of them being returned 82 yards for a touchdown.

In 2014, Wade's senior season, he was once again named a team captain. He started all eleven games for the team with a team-leading 81 tackles, four interceptions, and thirteen pass breakups. He was one of fifteen Jim Thorpe Award semifinalists. He finished his career as UTSA's all-time leader in tackles (288), pass breakups (34), interceptions (12), forced fumbles (8), and fumble recoveries (6).

=== Statistics ===
| Year | Team | Games | Stats | | | | | | | | | |
| Year | Team | GP | SOLO | AST | TOT | TFL | SACK | INT | PD | FF | FR | BLK |
|---|---|---|---|---|---|---|---|---|---|---|---|---|
| 2011 | UTSA | 10 | 23 | 16 | 39 | 1 | 0 | 2 | 0 | 1 | 0 | 0 |
| 2012 | UTSA | 12 | 45 | 29 | 74 | 1 | 0 | 4 | 11 | 4 | 2 | 0 |
| 2013 | UTSA | 12 | 54 | 40 | 94 | 2 | 0 | 2 | 7 | 0 | 0 | 0 |
| 2014 | UTSA | 12 | 47 | 39 | 86 | 0.5 | 0 | 4 | 14 | 1 | 2 | 0 |
| Career | | 46 | 145 | 112 | 257 | 3.5 | 0 | 12 | 33 | 5 | 4 | 0 |

== Professional career ==
Pre-draft measurables
| Height | Weight | Arm length | Hand span | 40-yard dash | 10-yard split | 20-yard split | 20-yard shuttle | Three-cone drill | Vertical jump | Broad jump | Bench press |
|---|---|---|---|---|---|---|---|---|---|---|---|
| 5 ft 11 7/8 in (1.83 m) | 185 lb (84 kg) | 31 1/4 in (0.79 m) | 9 in (0.23 m) | 4.57 s | 1.54 s | 2.69 s | 4.20 s | 7.33 s | 35 1/2 in (0.90 m) | 10 ft 1 in (3.07 m) | 7 reps |
All values from pro day

On May 8, 2015, Wade signed with the Seattle Seahawks of the National Football League (NFL) after going undrafted in the 2015 NFL draft. He was waived on August 31, 2015.

== Personal life ==
He is the son of Yu-Tandrain Smith and the late Reginald Wade.
