= Zah Frazier =

American football player (born 2000)

Profile
- Position: Cornerback

Personal information
- Born: October 5, 2000 (age 26); Cedartown, Georgia, U.S.
- Listed height: 6 ft 3 in (1.91 m)
- Listed weight: 186 lb (84 kg)

Career information
- High school: Cedartown (GA)
- College: Southern Illinois (2019); Coffeyville (2020–2021); UTSA (2022–2024)
- NFL draft: 2025: 5th round, 169th overall pick

Career history
- Chicago Bears (2025)*
- * Offseason or practice squad member only

Awards and highlights
- First-team All-AAC (2024); First-team Junior College All-American (2021)
- Stats at Pro Football Reference

Zahquan Frazier (born October 5, 2000) is an American professional football cornerback. He played college football for the Southern Illinois Salukis, Coffeyville Red Ravens and UTSA Roadrunners. Frazier was selected by the Chicago Bears in the fifth round of the 2025 NFL draft. He was released by the Bears in May 2026.

== Early life ==
Frazier was born on October 5, 2000, in Cedartown, Georgia. He attended Cedartown High School where he competed in football, basketball and track and field. He was an all-region selection as a junior, then an honorable mention all-area and first-team all-region selection as a senior in 2019. He committed to play college football for the Southern Illinois Salukis, the lone team to give him an offer.

== College career ==
Frazier appeared in four games for Southern Illinois in 2019, then transferred to Coffeyville Community College for the 2020 season. With the Coffeyville Red Ravens in 2020, he totaled nine tackles and three interceptions while being named second-team all-conference. He then made 26 tackles and placed 10th in the National Junior College Athletic Association (NJCAA) with 11 pass breakups in 2021, being named first-team all-conference and a first-team junior college All-American.

Frazier was a highly-regarded junior college recruit and initially committed to the Kentucky Wildcats before flipping to the UTSA Roadrunners, becoming UTSA's highest-ranked recruit in program history. However, he saw limited action in the 2022 season due to issues in learning the team's playbook. He then faced academic issues in 2023 that led to him being inactive until the ninth game, serving as the scout team wide receiver. He returned for a final year in 2024 and had a breakout season, setting the school record and placing second nationally with six interceptions. He was named first-team All-American Athletic Conference (AAC) and third-team All-American by Phil Steele, as well as first-team All-Texas by Dave Campbell's Texas Football. He was invited to the 2025 East–West Shrine Bowl and to the NFL Scouting Combine, being the sixth player in UTSA history to be invited to the latter.

== Professional career ==
Pre-draft measurables
Height	Weight	Arm length	Hand span	40-yard dash	10-yard split	20-yard split	20-yard shuttle	Three-cone drill	Vertical jump	Broad jump	Bench press
6 ft 2 7/8 in (1.90 m)	186 lb (84 kg)	32 7/8 in (0.84 m)	8 1/4 in (0.21 m)	4.36 s	1.51 s	2.54 s	4.26 s	7.00 s	37.0 in (0.94 m)	10 ft 6 in (3.20 m)	14 reps
All values from NFL Combine/Pro Day

Frazier was selected by the Chicago Bears with the 169th pick in the fifth round of the 2025 NFL draft. He did not play in his rookie season, having missed the offseason program and being placed on the non-football injury list for a "personal reason".

On May 7, 2026, Frazier was waived by the Bears.
