= Josiah Tauaefa =

American football player (born 1997)

No. 48
- Position: Linebacker

Personal information
- Born: March 5, 1997 (age 29); Dallas, Texas, U.S.
- Listed height: 6 ft 1 in (1.85 m)
- Listed weight: 235 lb (107 kg)

Career information
- High school: Lake Dallas (Corinth, Texas)
- College: UTSA
- NFL draft: 2019: undrafted

Career history
- New York Giants (2019)

Career NFL statistics
- Total tackles: 6
- Forced fumbles: 1
- Stats at Pro Football Reference

Josiah Tauaefa (born March 5, 1997) is an American former professional football player who was a linebacker in the National Football League (NFL). He played college football for the UTSA Roadrunners.

== Early life ==
Tauaefa grew up in Corinth, Texas and attended Lake Dallas High School, where he played fullback, linebacker and tight end on the football team. He was named the District 6-4A Defensive Most Valuable Player as a junior and named the District 6-5A Defensive Most Valuable Player and first-team all-district on offense as a senior.

== College career ==
Tauaefa spent four seasons as a member of the UTSA Roadrunners, redshirting his freshman year. In his redshirt freshman season, Tauaefa recorded a school-record 115 tackles (nine for loss), six sacks and an interception and was named first-team All-Conference USA, the conference Freshman of the Year, and became the first UTSA player to be named a Freshman All-American. As a redshirt junior, Tauaefa made a team-leading 113 total tackles and also led the Roadrunners with 11.5 tackles for loss and 4.5 sacks and was named honorable mention All-Conference USA. Tauaefa declared for the NFL draft following his redshirt junior season, forgoing his final year of eligibility and graduating from UTSA in 2018 with a degree in communications.

== Professional career ==
Tauaefa signed with the New York Giants as an undrafted free agent on April 27, 2019. He was cut by the Giants at the end of training camp but was re-signed to the team's practice squad on September 1, 2019. Tauaefa was promoted to the Giants' active roster on October 1, 2019. Tauaefa made his NFL debut on October 6, 2019 against the Minnesota Vikings, making three tackles (two for a loss).

Tauaefa was placed on the reserve/COVID-19 list by the Giants on August 4, 2020, but was activated the next day. He was waived on September 5, 2020.
