= Sincere McCormick =

American football player (born 2000)

No. 35 – San Francisco 49ers
- Position: Running back
- Roster status: Practice squad

Personal information
- Born: September 10, 2000 (age 26); Long Beach, California, U.S.
- Listed height: 5 ft 8 in (1.73 m)
- Listed weight: 204 lb (93 kg)

Career information
- High school: Judson (Converse, Texas)
- College: UTSA (2019–2021)
- NFL draft: 2022: undrafted

Career history
- Las Vegas Raiders (2022–2024); San Francisco 49ers (2025)*; Arizona Cardinals (2025)*; Denver Broncos (2025)*; Minnesota Vikings (2025)*; San Francisco 49ers (2026–present)*
- * Offseason or practice squad member only

Awards and highlights
- Third-team All-American (2021); 2× C-USA Offensive Player of the Year (2020, 2021); 2× First-team All-C-USA (2020, 2021); C-USA Rookie of the Year (2019)

Career NFL statistics as of 2025
- Rushing yards: 183
- Rushing average: 4.7
- Stats at Pro Football Reference

Sincere McCormick (born September 10, 2000) is an American professional football running back for the San Francisco 49ers of the National Football League (NFL). He played college football for the UTSA Roadrunners and was signed by the Las Vegas Raiders as an undrafted free agent in 2022.

== College career ==
As a freshman in 2019, McCormick rushed for 983 yards and eight touchdowns on 177 carries, an average of 5.6 yards per carry. He was selected as the Conference USA Freshman of the Year.

As a sophomore in 2020, he rushed for 1,467 yards, second most among all Division I FBS players. He was selected as the Conference USA Offensive Player of the Year, a semifinalist for the Doak Walker Award, and a second-team All-American.

As a junior in 2021, he rushed for 1,479 yards, fifth best among all Division I FBS players. After carrying 42 times for 184 yards and three touchdowns against Memphis, he was named National Player of the Week. He also helped lead the 2021 UTSA Roadrunners football team to a 12–1 record. In the 2021 Conference USA Football Championship Game, McCormick was named the Most Valuable Player, after rushing for 204 yards and three touchdowns on 36 carries.

== Professional career ==
Pre-draft measurables
Height	Weight	Arm length	Hand span	Wingspan	40-yard dash	10-yard split	20-yard split	20-yard shuttle	Three-cone drill	Vertical jump	Broad jump	Bench press
5 ft 8 1/2 in (1.74 m)	205 lb (93 kg)	29 7/8 in (0.76 m)	9 1/8 in (0.23 m)	6 ft 1 1/2 in (1.87 m)	4.60 s	1.59 s	2.70 s	4.41 s	7.14 s	33.5 in (0.85 m)	9 ft 8 in (2.95 m)	21 reps
All values from NFL Combine/Pro Day

=== Las Vegas Raiders ===
McCormick signed with the Las Vegas Raiders on May 4, 2022. He was placed on injured reserve on May 24.

On August 29, 2023, McCormick was waived by the Raiders and re-signed to the practice squad. He signed a reserve/future contract with Las Vegas on January 8, 2024.

On August 27, 2024, McCormick was waived by the Raiders and re-signed to the practice squad. He was promoted to the active roster on December 3.

On August 26, 2025, McCormick was waived by the Raiders as part of final roster cuts.

=== San Francisco 49ers (first stint) ===
On August 28, 2025, McCormick signed with the San Francisco 49ers' practice squad. On November 18, he was released from the practice squad.

=== Arizona Cardinals ===
On November 21, 2025, McCormick signed with the Arizona Cardinals' practice squad. He was released by the Cardinals on December 2.

=== Denver Broncos ===
On December 8, 2025, McCormick signed with the Denver Broncos' practice squad. On December 16, he was released from the practice squad.

=== Minnesota Vikings ===
On December 31, 2025, McCormick was signed to the Minnesota Vikings' practice squad.

=== San Francisco 49ers (second stint) ===
On April 28, 2026, McCormick signed with the San Francisco 49ers. He was waived by San Francisco on May 28. On June 10, McCormick re-signed with the 49ers on a one-year contract. He was waived by San Francisco as a part of final roster cuts on August 30, then subsequently re-signed to the practice squad the next day.

== NFL career statistics ==
Year	Team	Games		Rushing					Receiving					Fumbles	
Year	Team	GP	GS	Att	Yds	Avg	Lng	TD	Rec	Yds	Avg	Lng	TD	Fum	Lost
2024	LV	5	2	39	183	4.7	29	0	6	29	4.8	15	0	0	0
Career		5	2	39	183	4.7	29	0	6	29	4.8	15	0	0	0
