= Joshua Cephus =

American football player (born 2001)

No. 18 – Edmonton Elks
- Position: Wide receiver
- Roster status: Active
- CFL status: American

Personal information
- Born: March 5, 2001 (age 25); Houston, Texas, U.S.
- Listed height: 6 ft 2 in (1.88 m)
- Listed weight: 193 lb (88 kg)

Career information
- High school: Dekaney (Houston, Texas)
- College: UTSA (2019–2023)
- NFL draft: 2024: undrafted

Career history
- Jacksonville Jaguars (2024–2025); Edmonton Elks (2026–present)

Awards and highlights
- Grey Cup champion (2026); First-team All-AAC (2023); Second-team All-Conference USA (2022)

Career NFL statistics
- Games played: 1
- Stats at Pro Football Reference

Joshua Cephus (born March 5, 2001) is an American professional football wide receiver for the Edmonton Elks of the Canadian Football League (CFL). He played college football for the UTSA Roadrunners.

== Early life ==
Cephus attended Dekaney High School. He committed to play college football for the UTSA Roadrunners in 2019.

== College career ==
During the 2019 season with eight receptions 153 yards and a touchdown. In the 2020 season, Cephus finished the year with 58 receptions for 547 yards and five touchdowns. During the 2021 season, Cephus tallied 71 receptions for 819 yards and six touchdowns, as for his performance he was named honorable mention all Conference-USA. During the 2022 season, Cephus notched 87 receptions for 985 yards and six touchdowns. In week seven of the 2023 season, Cephus recorded seven receptions for 55 yards and two touchdowns, as he set the Roadrunners career record for reception's as he helped UTSA to a win over UAB. In week thirteen, Cephus hauled in 163 receiving yards and a touchdown, as he set the UTSA all-time receiving yards record in a win over South Florida. In the 2023 Frisco Bowl, Cephus hauled in seven receptions for 103 yards and a touchdown in a win over Marshall. In the game, he set the UTSA single-season receiving yards record, as he was named the offensive MVP of the bowl. Cephus finished the 2023 season with 89 receptions for 1,151 yards and ten touchdowns. For his performance on the 2023 season, Cephus was named first team all Conference-American.

== Professional career ==
Pre-draft measurables
Height	Weight	Arm length	Hand span	Wingspan	40-yard dash	10-yard split	20-yard split	20-yard shuttle	Three-cone drill	Vertical jump	Broad jump
6 ft 2 1/8 in (1.88 m)	193 lb (88 kg)	31 5/8 in (0.80 m)	9 1/8 in (0.23 m)	6 ft 4 in (1.93 m)	4.62 s	1.52 s	2.64 s	4.37 s	7.12 s	32.5 in (0.83 m)	10 ft 2 in (3.10 m)
All values from Pro Day

=== Jacksonville Jaguars ===
Cephus signed with the Jacksonville Jaguars as an undrafted free agent on April 30, 2024. He was waived on August 27, and re-signed to the practice squad. He signed a reserve/future contract with Jacksonville on January 6, 2025. He was waived/injured by the Jaguars on August 20.

=== Edmonton Elks ===
On May 7, 2026, Cephus signed with the Edmonton Elks of the Canadian Football League (CFL).

== Personal life ==
On December 9, 2022, Cephus was arrested for a DWI after having a blood alcohol concentration of 0.15 or higher, twice the legal limit. After pleading no contest, Cephus was sentenced to 15 months of probation.
