= Jarveon Williams =

American football player (born 1995)

No. 39, 40
- Position: Running back

Personal information
- Born: January 3, 1995 (age 31); Converse, Texas, U.S.
- Listed height: 5 ft 9 in (1.75 m)
- Listed weight: 205 lb (93 kg)

Career information
- High school: Converse (TX) Judson
- College: UTSA
- NFL draft: 2017: undrafted

Career history
- Cincinnati Bengals (2017); Montreal Alouettes (2019)
- Stats at Pro Football Reference

Jarveon Marquai Williams (born January 3, 1995) is an American former football running back who played for Cincinnati Bengals of the National Football League (NFL) and the Montreal Alouettes of the Canadian Football League (CFL). He played college football at the University of Texas at San Antonio.

== Professional career ==
Williams signed with the Cincinnati Bengals as an undrafted free agent on May 5, 2017. He was waived on September 2, 2017, and was signed to the practice squad the next day. He was promoted to the active roster on December 16, 2017.

On August 31, 2018, Williams was waived by the Bengals.
