= UTSA Roadrunners football =

American college football team

2026 UTSA Roadrunners football team
- First season: 2011; 15 years ago
- Athletic director: Lisa Campos
- Head coach: Jeff Traylor; 6th season, 53–26 (.671)
- Location: San Antonio, Texas
- Stadium: Alamodome (capacity: 34,984, expandable to 64,000)
- NCAA division: Division I FBS
- Conference: American
- Nickname: Roadrunners
- Colors: Navy blue, orange, and white
- All-time record: 98–87–0 (.530)
- Bowl record: 3–4 (.429)

Conference championships
- CUSA: 2021, 2022

Division championships
- CUSA West: 2021
- Rivalries: Texas State (rivalry); North Texas

Uniforms
- Fight song: Go Roadrunners, Go!
- Mascot: Rowdy
- Marching band: "The Spirit Of San Antonio" (SOSA)
- Website: goutsa.com/football

The UTSA Roadrunners football program represents the University of Texas at San Antonio (UTSA) in the sport of American football. The Roadrunners compete in the Football Bowl Subdivision (FBS) of the National Collegiate Athletic Association (NCAA) and the American Conference. They are coached by Jeff Traylor, who started in 2020. The Roadrunners play their home games at the Alamodome, which has a seating capacity of 65,000 but whose capacity for UTSA games is normally restricted to 34,984 (reduced from a previous value of 36,582).

== History ==
=== Start-up and organization (2006–2010) ===
In February 2006, the University of Texas at San Antonio approached Carr Sports Associates, Inc. to conduct a feasibility study and make recommendations to the university regarding an expansion of the athletics department. In November of that year, UTSA was given the final results of that study. Following the recommendations of CSA, the university facilitated a student referendum in September 2007 to gauge support for a fee increase. Nearly 66% of student voters supported the fee increase.

In December 2008, after the approval of the UTSA administration, the university presented the University of Texas System Board of Regents with a long-term plan that followed the feasibility study recommendations to build an $84 million athletic complex and the fee increase for their approval. It was approved by the board soon thereafter.

In January 2009, UTSA launched a campaign to raise money for the program dubbed the "Step Up UTSA" initiative. With a goal of $15 million USD, the campaign is meant to help fund coaches salaries, player scholarships, and construction of practice fields.

On February 4, 2009, former Miami head coach Larry Coker announced he had applied for the head coaching job. Later that month it was announced that Coker along with Tulsa's co-defensive coordinator Paul Randolph and Mel Tjeerdsma, head coach from Northwest Missouri State were the finalists for the position. On March 5, 2009, the San Antonio Express-News reported that Larry Coker, who had won the 2001 national championship as head coach of the Hurricanes, had earned the position. The next day Coker was officially announced as the Roadrunners' first head football coach in a press conference. On April 22, 2009, Coker announced the addition of Mike Menefee, Eric Roark, and David Ross to the roster as assistant football coaches.

On June 4, 2009, UTSA unveiled the team's inaugural helmet design. The design was done by Ohio-based Rickabaugh Graphics, and had final approval by Coker. On January 20, 2010, the program announced the hiring of Travis Bush as offensive coordinator. Bush had previously worked in the same capacity for his alma mater, Texas State.

Although plans for conference and subdivision affiliation were unclear, Lynn Hickey, UTSA's athletic director had strongly hinted at plans for UTSA to join its current conference, the Southland Conference (a member of the Division I FCS subdivision), in September 2009. However, in late January 2010, Hickey stated that the football program would attempt to join the Division I FBS subdivision by 2014 instead, citing an overall disappointment for previous plans. This entailed UTSA joining the subdivision as an independent until finding admission to a conference.

On February 3, 2010, National Signing Day, UTSA officially announced its inaugural signing class. The twenty-seven students consisted mainly of incoming freshmen, including two transfer students who were sophomores at the university. Seven of the student athletes were considered all-state performers from their high school careers. The class was heavily recruited from the Greater San Antonio area, as fourteen players were from such area high schools. Each player for the inaugural class was redshirted during the 2010 NCAA Division I FCS football season.

On March 16, 2010, UTSA announced Neal Neathery as defensive coordinator for the team. Neathery had last served in the same position for Drake.

In an effort to move the program to the FBS, UTSA had discussions with the Western Athletic Conference (WAC) about joining that conference after they lost Boise State to the Mountain West Conference during the summer of 2010.

In July 2010, the Northside Independent School District announced a three-year agreement that allowed UTSA to use Dub Farris Athletic Complex for practice. On September 15, 2010, UTSA held its first-ever practice at the stadium.

UTSA began practicing in August 2010, and began competing as an NCAA Division I FCS independent on September 3, 2011.

On November 10, 2010, it was reported that the WAC had offered UTSA, along with fellow Southland member Texas State and non-football Sun Belt Conference member Denver, an invitation to join its conference that would take effect in 2012. Denver would continue in its non-football status. Such an invitation was an effort to offset the departures of Boise State, Fresno State, and Nevada to the Mountain West Conference during the early stages of the early-2010s conference realignment. The following day, UTSA announced it had accepted the invitation.

=== Larry Coker era (2011–2015) ===
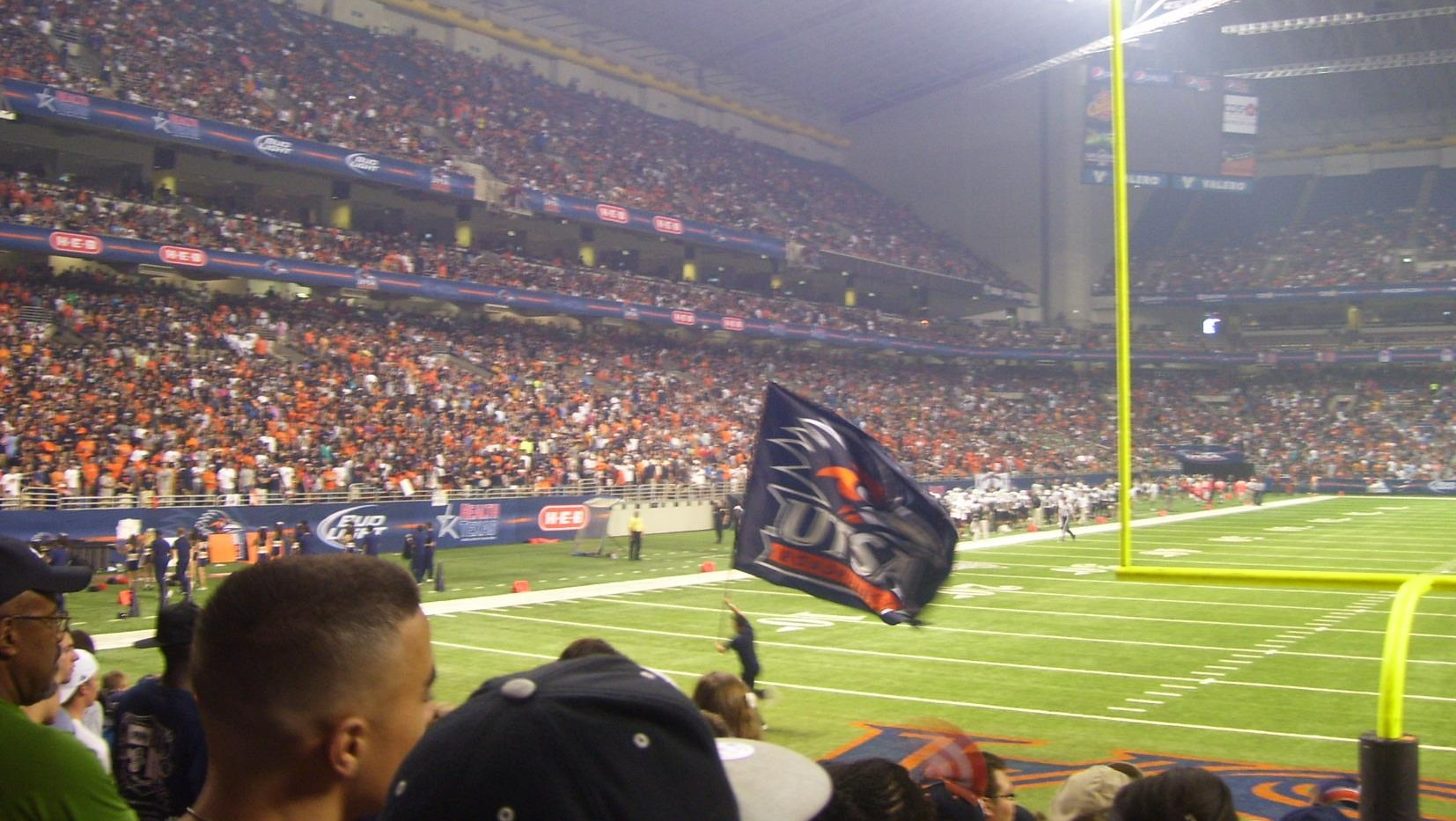
UTSA's inaugural football game

In 2011, UTSA started its inaugural season playing its first-ever game against Northeastern State on September 3, 2011, at the Alamodome. With attendance of 56,743, UTSA set a record for the highest-attended game for an NCAA Division I FBS start-up program. UTSA finished their first season with a record of 4–6, and set a record for the largest average home attendance for a new football program with 35,521. This topped the previous record from South Florida of 33,038 in 1997.

In 2012, UTSA followed up its initial campaign with an 8–4 second season as an FBS transitional member, including going 3–3 in the WAC. UTSA closed out its season with a 38–31 win over rival Texas State before an announced crowd of 39,032 at the Alamodome. For the 2012 season, UTSA averaged 29,226 in attendance. Due to being a transitional FBS member, UTSA was not eligible for a bowl.

In April 2012, it was announced that UTSA would join Conference USA on July 1, 2013, following its approval from the University of Texas System Board of Regents to allow the school to accept an invitation, negotiate and finalize terms with the league.

In 2013, UTSA played a full schedule of FBS opponents. In their second year of 2 transitional FBS seasons, UTSA was eligible for the C-USA championship. UTSA was only eligible for a bowl under certain criteria, such as if there were not enough bowl eligible teams. UTSA counted as an FBS opponent for bowl eligibility in 2013, and became fully bowl eligible in 2014. UTSA opened the 2013 season with a victory on the road against MWC member New Mexico, before losing at home to Big 12 member Oklahoma State before an announced crowd of 40,977. For the season, despite being picked last in the preseason media poll, UTSA finished at 7–5 overall, with a 6–2 record in conference, and averaged 29,214 in attendance. UTSA finished second in the West division, behind Rice. As a second year FBS transition team, UTSA however, was not selected for a bowl.

In 2014, UTSA opened with a 27–7 win over Houston in the opening of new TDECU Stadium. UTSA, however, finished with a disappointing 4–8 overall record and 3–5 in conference play. For the season, UTSA averaged 27,576 fans per game, including a season high of 33,472 against Arizona.

In 2015, UTSA finished with a disappointing 3–9 overall record. After a difficult non conference slate which saw UTSA start out 0–4, UTSA finished 3–5 in the conference, tied for 3rd out of 6 teams in the western division.

Larry Coker resigned on January 5, 2016, after compiling a 26–32 record in his 5 years as the Roadrunners' head coach.

In the 2016 NFL draft UTSA tight end David Morgan II became the school's first player to be drafted when he was selected in the 6th round (188th overall) by the Minnesota Vikings as well as the program's first All-American.

=== Frank Wilson era (2016–2019) ===
In January 2016, Frank Wilson was hired as UTSA's second ever head coach, replacing Larry Coker. In his first year as head coach, Wilson helped lead the Roadrunners to a 6–6 regular season record, marking the first time the Roadrunners became bowl eligible. UTSA was ultimately selected for its first bowl game in program history, the 2016 New Mexico Bowl. Wilson was also responsible for recruiting Frank Harris, a San Antonio-area quarterback who would become a city icon in his seven-year tenure with the program and lead the Roadrunners to their first two conference titles.

On September 9, 2017, UTSA had a landmark 17–10 victory over Baylor which gave UTSA its first ever victory over a Power Five team. UTSA would ultimately finish 6–5 for the season (one game against the Houston Cougars was canceled due to the aftereffects of Hurricane Harvey). Although UTSA was bowl eligible again, they did not receive an invite, ending their season.

On April 26, 2018, defensive end Marcus Davenport became the first Roadrunner to be a first-round draft pick, being selected 14th overall by the New Orleans Saints in the 2018 NFL draft.

In the 2018 season, UTSA struggled through its non-conference schedule, going 1–3 (their lone win being against rival Texas State). UTSA then won two consecutive conference games to improve to 3–3, but dropped its remaining six games to finish 3–9.

After another struggle in the 2019 season, in which the Roadrunners finished 4–8 overall and 3–5 in conference play, UTSA fired Wilson on December 1, 2019 after 4 seasons and a 19–29 overall record.

=== Jeff Traylor era (2020–present) ===
On December 9, 2019, Arkansas running backs coach Jeff Traylor was hired as the 3rd head coach in the program's history. Upon accepting the position Traylor was tasked with shaping the program's culture and did so by introducing the "210 Triangle of Toughness". The "Triangle of Toughness" grew to be more than just representing San Antonio (through the city's area code), but the identity of the program. Players and coaches are expected to embody all traits of the triangle: Selflessness, perfect effort, integrity, passion and toughness. After going 2-0 in Coach Traylor's first season as Head Coach, the program received votes in the Associated Press Top 25 Poll for the first time. Traylor also became the first head coach in program history to start his career with three wins after beating MTSU on September 25, 2020. UTSA finished the 2020 regular season with a record of 7-4 along with a second bowl game appearance in program history at the First Responder Bowl. In Traylor's second season at the helm UTSA would go on to complete the 2021 regular season campaign with an 11-1 record. This would account for the most wins in a single regular season and the longest win streak in program history.

Under Coach Traylor the UTSA Football program earned its first top 25 rankings in week 8 of the 2021 season. The rankings included ESPN's Power Rankings (#24), USA Today Sports AFCA Coach's Poll (#25), and in the Associated Press Top 25 (#24). UTSA was controversially left out of the initial College Football Playoff ranking for the 2021 season and became the second undefeated team to be excluded from the initial ranking in history. However the following week the Roadrunners made history once again becoming ranked by the College Football Playoff Selection Committee for the first time in program history. This also marked the first time in program history that UTSA was ranked in all three polls/rankings (Associated Press #15, USA Today Sports AFCA Coach's Poll #16, and #23 in the College Football Playoff Selection Committee rankings). On October 21, 2021, it was announced that UTSA had joined the American and started participating as a conference member in 2023.

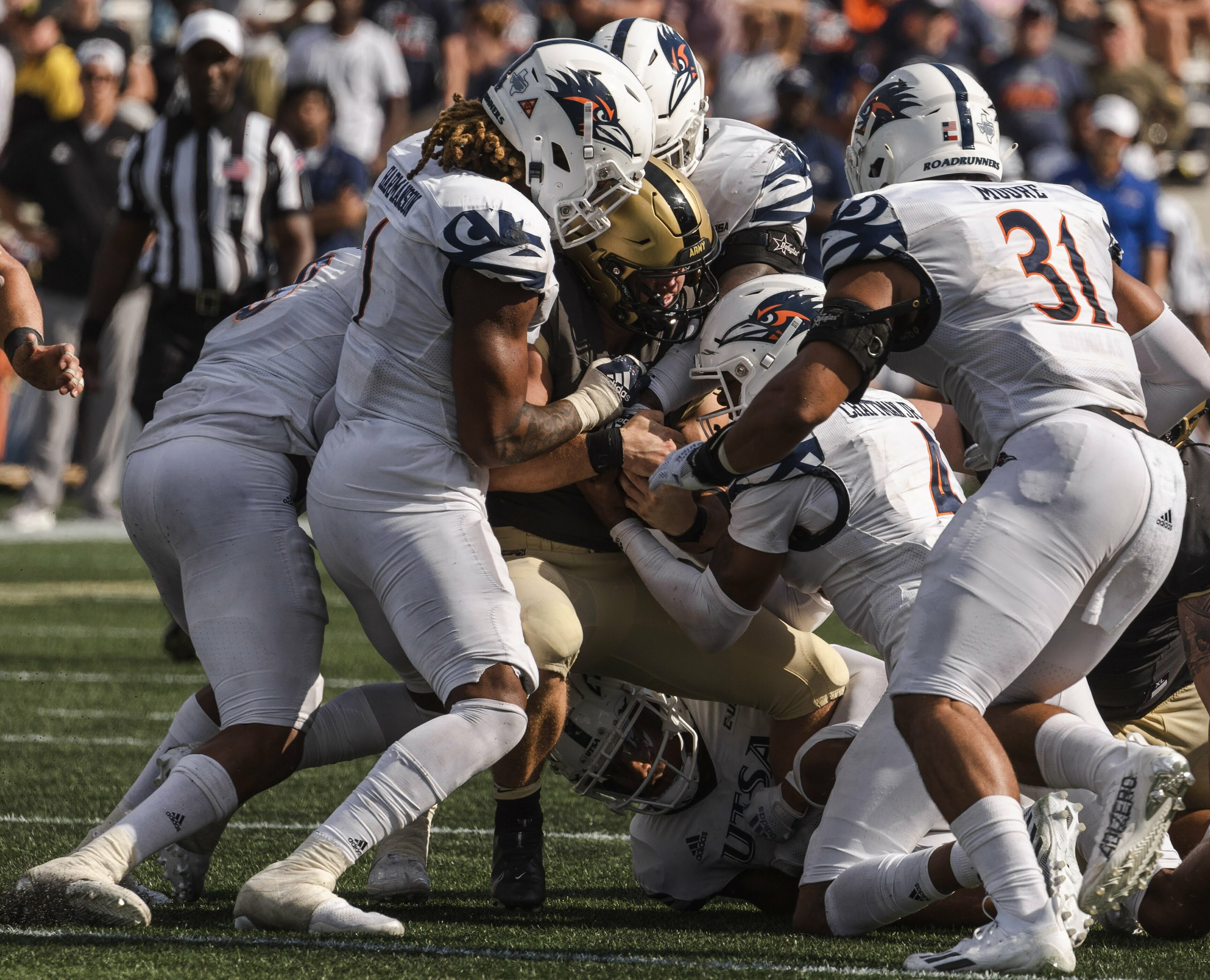
A game between UTSA and Army in 2022

== Conference affiliations ==
- FCS Independent (2011)
- Western Athletic Conference (2012)
- Conference USA (2013–2022)
- American Conference (2023–present)

== Championships ==
=== Conference championships ===
Season	Conference	Coach	Overall Record	Conference Record
2021	Conference USA	Jeff Traylor	12–2	7–1
2022	Conference USA	Jeff Traylor	11–3	8–0

=== Division championships ===
Season	Division	Coach	Opponent	CG Result
2021	Conference USA - West	Jeff Traylor	Western Kentucky	W 49–41

== Bowl games ==
UTSA has played in seven bowl games, compiling a record of 3–4. In 2016, UTSA tied an NCAA record for fastest program to reach a bowl game (as measured from the start of varsity play), doing so in their sixth season.

Season	Coach	Bowl	Opponent	Result
2016	Frank Wilson	New Mexico Bowl	New Mexico	L 20–23
2020	Jeff Traylor	First Responder Bowl	No. 19 Louisiana	L 24–31
2021	Jeff Traylor	Frisco Bowl	No. 24 San Diego State	L 24–38
2022	Jeff Traylor	Cure Bowl	No. 24 Troy	L 12–18
2023	Jeff Traylor	Frisco Bowl	Marshall	W 35–17
2024	Jeff Traylor	Myrtle Beach Bowl	Coastal Carolina	W 44–15
2025	Jeff Traylor	First Responder Bowl	FIU	W 57–20

== Rivalries ==
=== Texas State ===
The I-35 Rivalry is the rivalry between Texas State and UTSA. The teams first met in 2012, both as members of the WAC. In 2013, Texas State moved to the Sun Belt Conference and UTSA moved to Conference USA, temporarily halting the matchups. The series was renewed in 2017 and has been played five times since then. UTSA holds a 5–2 record in the series through the 2025 season.

=== North Texas ===
North Texas and UTSA first met in 2013. That year both were first year members of Conference USA. UTSA and North Texas have played 10 times with both teams winning five. The first game was played at Apogee Stadium in Denton on November 23, 2013. North Texas needed to win the game to clinch the Conference USA West division. UTSA stunned the Mean Green when they won the game 21–13. The Roadrunner win allowed Rice to become the west division champions. UTSA won three of the first four meetings. North Texas got their first win in the series in 2015. In 2017 North Texas stunned UTSA with a last minute drive of 90 yards to win the game. That began a streak of three wins in a row by the Mean Green against UTSA. The Roadrunners snapped that streak with a win in 2020. In 2021 North Texas gave UTSA their only loss of the season in the final game of the regular season. UTSA stunned North Texas in 2022 by completing a 90-yard game winning drive in the Alamodome. The two met on December 2 in the Alamodome with UTSA winning the Conference USA Championship game. In their first meeting in The American Conference play UTSA won their first game in Denton in ten years.

=== Incarnate Word Cardinals ===
Incarnate Word and UTSA first met in 2019. Even though the two schools are only a few miles apart in San Antonio, they had taken different paths in college football, with UTSA competing in the FBS since 2012 and UIW building its program in the FCS.

== Future non-conference opponents ==
Announced schedules as of November 19, 2026.

2027	2028	2029	2030	2031	2032
at Sam Houston	at Texas State	Texas State	Sam Houston	Texas State	at Air Force
Abilene Christian	at Texas	at UNLV	at Texas State		
at LSU	Air Force		at Texas		
Texas State					
