= Marlin Dean =

American football player

No. 4 – UAB Blazers
- Position: Defensive end
- Class: Senior

Personal information
- Listed height: 6 ft 5 in (1.96 m)
- Listed weight: 240 lb (109 kg)

Career information
- High school: IMG Academy (Bradenton, Florida)
- College: Georgia (2021); Butler CC (2023); Utah State (2024); Georgia State (2025); UAB (2026–present)

Awards and highlights
- CFP national champion (2021)
- Stats at ESPN

Marlin Dean is an American college football defensive end for the UAB Blazers. He previously played for the Butler Grizzlies, Georgia Bulldogs, Georgia State Panthers, and Utah State Aggies.

== Early life ==
Dean attended Elbert County High School in Elbert County, Georgia for his first three seasons before transferring to IMG Academy for his senior season. Coming out of high school, he committed to play college football for the Georgia Bulldogs over offers from Auburn, Georgia, Colorado, West Virginia, East Carolina, Georgia State, Florida State, South Carolina, and Georgia Tech.

== College career ==
In two years at Georgia in 2021 and 2022, Dean notched two tackles in one game played. After the 2022 season, he entered the NCAA transfer portal. Dean transferred to play for the Butler Grizzlies. He posted 25 tackles with 10 being for a loss, seven and a half sacks, and two forced fumbles in 2023 and again entered the NCAA transfer portal after the season.

Dean transferred to play for the Utah State Aggies. In 2024, he tallied six tackles and a sack and a half in nine games, after which he again entered the transfer portal. Dean transferred to play for the Georgia State Panthers. He finished the 2025 season with 32 tackles, a sack, a safety, and a forced fumble in 11 games, after which he again entered the transfer portal.

Dean transferred to play for the UAB Blazers. In week four of the 2026 season, he recorded 12 tackles with four and a half for a loss, two and a half sacks, and three forced fumbles in a win over Navy, earning American Conference Defensive Player of the Week honors. In week 10, Dean notched four tackles, three sacks, and a forced fumble in a win against Charlotte.
