= 2026 East Carolina Pirates football team =

American college football season

2026 East Carolina Pirates football
- Conference: American Conference
- Record: 7–4 (5–2 American)
- Head coach: Blake Harrell (2nd season)
- Offensive coordinator: Jordan Davis (1st season)
- Offensive scheme: Spread
- Defensive coordinator: Jordon Hankins (1st season)
- Co-defensive coordinator: Roy Tesh (1st season)
- Base defense: 4–3
- Home stadium: Dowdy–Ficklen Stadium

2026 American Conference football standings
	Conf.			Overall
Team	W		L	W		L
UTSA	6	–	1	9	–	2
Memphis	5	–	2	8	–	3
East Carolina	5	–	2	7	–	4
North Texas	5	–	2	7	–	4
UAB	4	–	3	6	–	5
Army	4	–	3	5	–	5
Tulsa	4	–	3	7	–	4
Florida Atlantic	4	–	3	7	–	4
Tulane	4	–	3	6	–	5
Navy	3	–	4	4	–	6
South Florida	2	–	5	6	–	5
Rice	1	–	6	2	–	9
Charlotte	1	–	6	1	–	10
Temple	1	–	6	2	–	9
Championship: December 5, 2026
As of November 22, 2026; Rankings from AP poll

The 2026 East Carolina Pirates football team is who represents East Carolina University as they a member of the American Conference playing during the 2026 NCAA Division I FBS football season. They are led by second-year head coach Blake Harrell, and play their home games at Dowdy-Ficklen Stadium in Greenville, North Carolina.

== Schedule ==
Date	Time	Opponent	Site	TV	Result	Attendance
September 5	12:00 p.m.	at No. 13 Alabama*	Bryant-Denny Stadium; Tuscaloosa, AL	ABC	L 10–48	100,077
September 12	12:00 p.m.	Appalachian State*	Dowdy–Ficklen Stadium; Greenville, NC	ESPNU	L 24–27	40,074
September 19	6:00 p.m.	at Old Dominion*	S.B. Ballard Stadium; Norfolk, VA	ESPN+	W 20–17	21,444
September 26	4:00 p.m.	North Carolina Central*	Dowdy–Ficklen Stadium; Greenville, NC	ESPN+	W 42–9	43,772
October 10	1:00 p.m.	Rice^{†}	Dowdy–Ficklen Stadium; Greenville, NC	ESPN+	W 28–12	33,968
October 15	7:30 p.m.	at UAB	Protective Stadium; Birmingham, AL	ESPN	L 17–30 ^{OT}	19,834
October 22	7:30 p.m.	at Memphis	Simmons Bank Liberty Stadium; Memphis, TN	ESPN2	L 34–41 ^{OT}	27,788
October 31	3:00 p.m.	Temple	Dowdy–Ficklen Stadium; Greenville, NC	ESPN+	W 17–9	30,213
November 6	7:30 p.m.	South Florida	Dowdy–Ficklen Stadium; Greenville, NC	ESPN2	W 20–17	33,708
November 14	1:00 p.m.	at Charlotte	Jerry Richardson Stadium; Charlotte, NC	ESPN+	W 17–16	13,209
November 21	12:00 p.m.	at Army	Michie Stadium; West Point, NY	CBSSN	W 10–6	26,425
November 28	1:00 p.m.	Florida Atlantic	Dowdy–Ficklen Stadium; Greenville, NC	ESPN+		
*Non-conference game; ^{†}Homecoming; Rankings from AP Poll and CFP Rankings released prior to game; All times are in Eastern time

== Game summaries ==
=== at No. 13 Alabama ===
East Carolina Pirates (0–0) at No. 13 Alabama Crimson Tide (0–0) – Game summary

Quarter	1	2	3	4	Total
Pirates	0	7	3	0	10
No. 13 Crimson Tide	10	28	0	10	48

at Bryant–Denny Stadium • Tuscaloosa, Alabama

- Date: September 5
- Game time: 12:00 p.m. EDT / 11:00 a.m. CDT
- Game weather: Sunny • Temperature: 90 °F (32 °C) • Wind: S at 4 miles per hour (6.4 km/h)
- Game attendance: 100,077
- Referee: Jason Autrey
- TV announcers (ABC): Bob Wischusen, Louis Riddick and Stormy Buonantony

Game information

First quarter

- ALA – Conor Talty 41-yard field goal, 9:30. Crimson Tide 3–0. Drive: 9 plays, 46 yards, 5:24.
- ALA – EJ Crowell 3-yard run (Conor Talty kick), 4:12. Crimson Tide 10–0. Drive: 9 plays, 86 yards, 4:02.

Second quarter

- ALA – Daniel Hill 4-yard run (Conor Talty kick), 14:48. Crimson Tide 17–0. Drive: 6 plays, 26 yards, 2:24.
- ECU – Jeremiah Melvin 1-yard pass from Mitch Griffis (Noah Perez kick), 13:41. Crimson Tide 17–7. Drive: 3 plays, 75 yards, 1:07.
- ALA – Daniel Hill 2-yard run (Conor Talty kick), 10:02. Crimson Tide 24–7. Drive: 7 plays, 86 yards, 3:33.
- ALA – Yhonzae Pierre 27-yard interception return (Conor Talty kick), 9:15. Crimson Tide 31–7.
- ALA – Keelon Russell 3-yard run (Conor Talty kick), 0:14. Crimson Tide 38–7. Drive: 15 plays, 80 yards, 6:11.

Third quarter

- ECU – Noah Perez 34-yard field goal, 10:54. Crimson Tide 38–10. Drive: 6 plays, 14 yards, 2:39.

Fourth quarter

- ALA – Trae'shawn Brown 2-yard run (Conor Talty kick), 14:57. Crimson Tide 45–10. Drive: 9 plays, 77 yards, 3:17.
- ALA – Conor Talty 21-yard field goal, 6:15. Crimson Tide 48–10. Drive: 12 plays, 70 yards, 7:10.

Statistics	ECU	ALA
First downs	5	28
Plays–yards	41–162	81–487
Rushes–yards	22–2	49–227
Passing yards	160	260
Passing: comp–att–int	11–19–1	19–32–0
Turnovers	1	1
Time of possession	21:07	38:53

Team	Category	Player	Statistics
East Carolina	Passing	Mitch Griffis	10/16, 137 yards, TD, INT
East Carolina	Rushing	Ashton Gray	6 carries, 17 yards
East Carolina	Receiving	Tyler Johnson	1 reception, 68 yards
Alabama	Passing	Keelon Russell	18/30, 256 yards
Alabama	Rushing	Keelon Russell	13 carries, 86 yards, TD
Alabama	Receiving	Ryan Coleman-Williams	5 receptions, 130 yards

=== Appalachian State ===
Appalachian State Mountaineers (1–0) at East Carolina Pirates (0–1) – Game summary

Quarter	1	2	3	4	Total
Mountaineers	3	14	10	0	27
Pirates	7	3	7	7	24

at Dowdy–Ficklen Stadium • Greenville, North Carolina

- Date: September 12
- Game time: 12:00 p.m. EDT
- Game weather: Cloudy • Temperature: 86 °F (30 °C)
- Game attendance: 40,074
- Referee: Edwin Lee
- TV announcers (ESPNU): Tiffany Greene and Jay Walker

Game information

First quarter

- ECU – Michael Allen 2-yard run (Noah Perez kick), 4:11. Pirates 7–0. Drive: 8 plays, 83 yards, 2:57.
- APP – James London 41-yard field goal, 0:44. Pirates 7–3. Drive: 7 plays, 44 yards, 3:22.

Second quarter

- APP – Malachi Singleton 4-yard run (James London kick), 14:17. Mountaineers 10–7. Drive: 4 plays, 12 yards, 1:18.
- APP – Jaquari Lewis 10-yard run (James London kick), 8:44. Mountaineers 17–7. Drive: 7 plays, 83 yards, 3:51.
- ECU – Noah Perez 33-yard field goal, 1:21. Mountaineers 17–10. Drive: 7 plays, 60 yards, 2:11.

Third quarter

- APP – Treyaun Webb 13-yard run (James London kick), 12:12. Mountaineers 24–10. Drive: 7 plays, 80 yards, 2:45.
- ECU – Jason Dickerson 61-yard pass from Mitch Griffis (Noah Perez kick), 10:36. Mountaineers 24–17. Drive: 5 plays, 75 yards, 1:36.
- APP – James London 34-yard field goal, 3:57. Mountaineers 27–17. Drive: 4 plays, 6 yards, 2:03.

Fourth quarter

- ECU – Ja'Keith Hamilton 7-yard pass from Mitch Griffis (Noah Perez kick), 0:21. Mountaineers 27–24. Drive: 9 plays, 60 yards, 1:35.

Statistics	APP	ECU
First downs	21	22
Plays–yards	72–396	72–417
Rushes–yards	44–129	35–187
Passing yards	267	230
Passing: comp–att–int	20–28–0	21–37–1
Turnovers	0	2
Time of possession	36:06	23:54

Team	Category	Player	Statistics
Appalachian State	Passing	Malachi Singleton	20/28, 267 yards
Appalachian State	Rushing	Jaquari Lewis	17 carries, 73 yards, TD
Appalachian State	Receiving	Sam Pickett III	4 receptions, 86 yards
East Carolina	Passing	Mitch Griffis	21/37, 230 yards, 2 TD, INT
East Carolina	Rushing	Ashton Gray	16 carries, 99 yards
East Carolina	Receiving	Jeremiah Melvin	7 receptions, 94 yards

=== at Old Dominion ===
East Carolina Pirates (0–2) at Old Dominion Monarchs (1–1) – Game summary

Quarter	1	2	3	4	Total
Pirates	7	3	7	3	20
Monarchs	0	17	0	0	17

at S.B. Ballard Stadium • Norfolk, Virginia

- Date: September 19
- Game time: 6:00 p.m. EDT
- Game weather: Sunny • Temperature: 80 °F (27 °C) • Wind: NE 9 mph
- Game attendance: 21,444
- Referee: Charles Lamertina
- TV announcers (ESPN+): Scott Jackson (play-by-play) and Andy Mashaw (analyst)

Game information

First quarter

- ECU – Ja'Keith Hamilton 25-yard pass from Jason Dickerson (Noah Perez kick), 6:03. Pirates 7–0. Drive: 2 plays, 28 yards, 0:41.

Second quarter

- ODU – Nathanial Eichner 38-yard field goal, 9:17. Pirates 7–3. Drive: 6 plays, 60 yards, 3:12.
- ODU – Daevon Iles 23-yard fumble returned (Nathanial Eichner kick), 8:12. Monarchs 10–7. Drive: 3 plays, -2 yards, 1:05.
- ODU – Quinn Henicle 18-yard run (Nathanial Eichner kick), 4:14. Monarchs 17–7. Drive: 5 plays, 35 yards, 1:48.
- ECU – Noah Perez 36-yard field goal, 0:02. Monarchs 17–10. Drive: 7 plays, 56 yards, 1:03.

Third quarter

- ECU – Ayden Duncanson 67-yard interception return (Noah Perez kick), 12:36. Tied 17–17. Drive: 5 plays, 37 yards, 2:20.

Fourth quarter

- ECU – Noah Perez 24-yard field goal, 9:39. Pirates 20–17. Drive: 12 plays, 77 yards, 7:07.

Statistics	ECU	ODU
First downs	17	15
Plays–yards	68–276	64–274
Rushes–yards	47–173	44–180
Passing yards	103	94
Passing: comp–att–int	11–21–0	8–20–1
Turnovers	1	2
Time of possession	30:37	29:23

Team	Category	Player	Statistics
East Carolina	Passing	Mitch Griffis	4/12, 58 yards
East Carolina	Rushing	TJ Engleman Jr.	16 carries, 99 yards
East Carolina	Receiving	Dillon Lorick	1 reception, 27 yards
Old Dominion	Passing	Quinn Henicle	8/20, 94 yards, INT
Old Dominion	Rushing	Devin Roche	18 carries, 102 yards
Old Dominion	Receiving	Zialis Blackmon	1 reception, 42 yards

=== North Carolina Central (FCS) ===
North Carolina Central Eagles (FCS) (2–2) at East Carolina Pirates (1–2) – Game summary

Quarter	1	2	3	4	Total
Eagles (FCS)	0	0	0	0	0
Pirates	0	0	0	0	0

at Dowdy–Ficklen Stadium • Greenville, North Carolina

- Date: September 26
- Game time: 4:00 p.m. EDT
- TV announcers (ESPN+): Evan Budrovich (play-by-play) and Jay Sonnhalter (analyst)

Statistics	NCCU	ECU
First downs		
Plays–yards		
Rushes–yards		
Passing yards		
Passing: comp–att–int		
Time of possession		

Team	Category	Player	Statistics
North Carolina Central	Passing		
North Carolina Central	Rushing		
North Carolina Central	Receiving		
East Carolina	Passing		
East Carolina	Rushing		
East Carolina	Receiving		

=== Rice ===
Rice Owls (1–4) at East Carolina Pirates (2–2) – Game summary

Quarter	1	2	3	4	Total
Owls	0	0	0	0	0
Pirates	0	0	0	0	0

at Dowdy–Ficklen Stadium • Greenville, North Carolina

- Date: October 10
- Game time: 1:00 p.m.
- TV: ESPN+

Statistics	RICE	ECU
First downs		
Plays–yards		
Rushes–yards		
Passing yards		
Passing: comp–att–int		
Time of possession		

Team	Category	Player	Statistics
Rice	Passing		
Rice	Rushing		
Rice	Receiving		
East Carolina	Passing		
East Carolina	Rushing		
East Carolina	Receiving		

=== at UAB ===
East Carolina Pirates (3–2) at UAB Blazers (3–3) – Game summary

Quarter	1	2	3	4	Total
Pirates	0	0	0	0	0
Blazers	0	0	0	0	0

at Protective Stadium • Birmingham, Alabama

- Date: October 15
- Game time: 7:30 p.m. EDT
- TV: ESPN/ESPN2

Statistics	ECU	UAB
First downs		
Plays–yards		
Rushes–yards		
Passing yards		
Passing: comp–att–int		
Time of possession		

Team	Category	Player	Statistics
East Carolina	Passing		
East Carolina	Rushing		
East Carolina	Receiving		
UAB	Passing		
UAB	Rushing		
UAB	Receiving		

=== at Memphis ===
East Carolina Pirates (3–3) at Memphis Tigers (5–2) – Game summary

Quarter	1	2	3	4	Total
Pirates	0	0	0	0	0
Tigers	0	0	0	0	0

at Simmons Bank Liberty Stadium • Memphis, Tennessee

- Date: October 22
- Game time: 7:30 p.m. EDT
- TV announcers (ESPN2): Matt Barrie play by play, Chase Daniel, analyst & Paul Carcaterra reporter

Statistics	ECU	MEM
First downs		
Plays–yards		
Rushes–yards		
Passing yards		
Passing: comp–att–int		
Time of possession		

Team	Category	Player	Statistics
East Carolina	Passing		
East Carolina	Rushing		
East Carolina	Receiving		
Memphis	Passing		
Memphis	Rushing		
Memphis	Receiving		

=== Temple ===
Temple Owls (2–5) at East Carolina Pirates (3–4) – Game summary

Quarter	1	2	3	4	Total
Owls	0	0	0	0	0
Pirates	0	0	0	0	0

at Dowdy–Ficklen Stadium • Greenville, North Carolina

- Date: October 31
- Game time: TBD

Statistics	TEM	ECU
First downs		
Plays–yards		
Rushes–yards		
Passing yards		
Passing: comp–att–int		
Time of possession		

Team	Category	Player	Statistics
Temple	Passing		
Temple	Rushing		
Temple	Receiving		
East Carolina	Passing		
East Carolina	Rushing		
East Carolina	Receiving		

=== South Florida ===
South Florida Bulls (6–2) at East Carolina Pirates (4–4) – Game summary

Quarter	1	2	3	4	Total
Bulls	0	0	0	0	0
Pirates	0	0	0	0	0

at Dowdy–Ficklen Stadium • Greenville, North Carolina

- Date: November 6
- Game time: 7:30 p.m. EST
- TV: ESPN2

Statistics	USF	ECU
First downs		
Plays–yards		
Rushes–yards		
Passing yards		
Passing: comp–att–int		
Time of possession		

Team	Category	Player	Statistics
South Florida	Passing		
South Florida	Rushing		
South Florida	Receiving		
East Carolina	Passing		
East Carolina	Rushing		
East Carolina	Receiving		

=== at Charlotte ===
East Carolina Pirates (5–4) at Charlotte 49ers (1–8) – Game summary

Quarter	1	2	3	4	Total
Pirates	0	0	0	0	0
49ers	0	0	0	0	0

at Jerry Richardson Stadium • Charlotte, North Carolina

- Date: November 14
- Game time: TBD

Statistics	ECU	CLT
First downs		
Plays–yards		
Rushes–yards		
Passing yards		
Passing: comp–att–int		
Time of possession		

Team	Category	Player	Statistics
East Carolina	Passing		
East Carolina	Rushing		
East Carolina	Receiving		
Charlotte	Passing		
Charlotte	Rushing		
Charlotte	Receiving		

=== at Army ===
East Carolina Pirates (6–4) at Army Black Knights (5–4) – Game summary

Quarter	1	2	3	4	Total
Pirates	0	0	0	0	0
Black Knights	0	0	0	0	0

at Michie Stadium • West Point, New York

- Date: November 21
- Game time: 12:00 p.m. EST
- TV: CBSSN

Statistics	ECU	ARMY
First downs		
Plays–yards		
Rushes–yards		
Passing yards		
Passing: comp–att–int		
Time of possession		

Team	Category	Player	Statistics
East Carolina	Passing		
East Carolina	Rushing		
East Carolina	Receiving		
Army	Passing		
Army	Rushing		
Army	Receiving		

=== Florida Atlantic ===
Florida Atlantic Owls (7–4) at East Carolina Pirates (7–4) – Game summary

Quarter	1	2	3	4	Total
Owls	0	0	0	0	0
Pirates	0	0	0	0	0

at Dowdy–Ficklen Stadium • Greenville, North Carolina

- Date: November 27 or 28
- Game time: TBD

Statistics	FAU	ECU
First downs		
Plays–yards		
Rushes–yards		
Passing yards		
Passing: comp–att–int		
Time of possession		

Team	Category	Player	Statistics
Florida Atlantic	Passing		
Florida Atlantic	Rushing		
Florida Atlantic	Receiving		
East Carolina	Passing		
East Carolina	Rushing		
East Carolina	Receiving		

== Personnel ==
=== Roster ===
2026 East Carolina Pirates football team roster
Players
Coaches
Offense

Pos.	#	Name	Class
WR	0	Kyler Pearson	Sr
WR	1	Ray Ray Joseph	Jr
WR	2	Tyler Johnson	Sr
RB	3	Ashton Gray	So
RB	4	TJ Engleman Jr.	So
RB	5	DeJuan Lacy	So
TE	6	Kanen Hamlett	Sr
QB	7	Cole Hodge	Fr
WR	7	Landon Sides	Sr
TE	8	Ismael Smith Flores	Jr
QB	9	Emory Williams	Jr
WR	10	Brock Spalding	Sr
WR	11	Jeremiah Melvin	So
QB	12	Mitch Griffis	Sr
QB	13	Trey Burke	Fr
WR	14	Dillon Lorick	So
WR	15	Ja'Keith Hamilton	Jr
WR	17	Johnny Williams	Fr
WR	19	Jaquaize Pettaway	Sr
RB	21	Michael Allen	Sr
RB	22	Michael Beatty	So
RB	23	Meliq McGowan	Fr
WR	24	Jason Dickerson	So
WR	25	McCallum Wright	Jr
RB	26	DaMari Gantt	So
TE	45	Mason Brown	Jr
OL	50	Joshua Battle	Fr
OL	52	Zach Caulder	Sr
OL	54	Niko Paic	Sr
OL	55	Ethan Kramer	Sr
OL	56	Bryson Esser	Jr
OL	57	Ian Hemilright	So
OL	58	Brandon Best	Sr
OL	59	Xavier Massey	Fr
OL	61	Brooks Culp	Fr
OL	63	Alex Luebke	Fr
OL	65	Preston Broadway	Fr
OL	66	Marleo Neolien	Jr
OL	67	Cayman Reynolds	Fr
OL	68	Tre Hardison	Sr
OL	69	Kendall Walton	Fr
OL	70	Peyton Reeder	Fr
OL	71	Bryce Weaver	Jr
OL	72	Christian Harris	Jr
OL	73	Karson Jones	Jr
OL	74	Jeremiah Williams	Jr
OL	75	Hayes Creel	Sr
OL	77	Ja'Vaughn Hargett	Fr
OL	79	Justin Garrard	Fr
WR	80	Ty Johnson	So
WR	81	Mason Scott	So
TE	82	Gage Reale	Sr
WR	84	Connor Hodge	Fr
TE	86	Kaleb Morrow	Fr
WR	87	Trenton Cloud	So
WR	88	Dawson Quarterman	Fr
TE	89	Jacob Holland	Fr

Defense

Pos.	#	Name	Class
DL	0	Jasiyah Robinson	Sr
LB	1	Jackson Barker	Sr
DB	2	Jaylen Bowden	Sr
DB	3	Zyeir Gamble	Jr
DB	4	Kevon Merrell	Jr
DL	5	Kieran Davis	Jr
DB	6	DeMarius Hines	So
DB	7	Ashton Levells-Mitchell	Sr
DB	8	Kamaurri McKinley	Jr
DL	9	Kendrick DuJour	Sr
LB	10	Crews Law	So
LB	11	DJ Johnson Jr.	Jr
DB	12	Myles Pollard	Sr
DB	13	Ayden Duncanson	Jr
DB	14	Derrion Horsley	Fr
DB	15	Christian Peterson	Jr
DB	17	Rae'mon Mosby	So
DB	19	Jurnee Lattimore	So
LB	20	Cade Law	Sr
DB	21	Jonathan Akins	So
DB	22	Angelo Ross	Fr
DB	23	Josh Benton	Sr
DB	23	Tavius Horne Jr.	Fr
DB	24	Durante Speer	Fr
LB	25	Stephen Collier	Fr
DB	26	Alex Moye	So
DB	27	Miles Gaddy	So
DB	28	David Coleman Jr.	Fr
LB	30	Reagan Printy	So
DB	31	Djimon McLendon	Fr
LB	32	LJ Porter	Fr
DL	33	Terande Spencer	Fr
DB	34	Adam Cole	Jr
LB	35	Landon Lewis	Fr
DB	37	Amare Mack	Fr
DB	38	Riley Robinson	Fr
DB	39	Callaway Williams	Fr
DL	40	Dylon Worthen	Fr
LB	41	Jayden Olden	So
LB	42	Julien Davis	Jr
LB	43	Jordan David Miles	So
DL	44	Preston Carr	Sr
LB	49	Chad Fairchild	Fr
DL	50	Evan Powell	Fr
DL	51	Zyon Ratchford	Fr
OLB	53	Matt Payes	Fr
DL	55	Dominick Moody	Fr
DL	88	Rion Roseborough	Jr
DL	90	Josiah Dwyer	Fr
DL	91	Miles Parker	So
DL	94	Javon Williams	So
DL	95	Ethan Wilson	Fr
DL	97	Jacoby Martin	So
DL	98	Torin Brazell	So
DL	99	Kelton Smith	Fr

Special teams

Pos.	#	Name	Class
K	43	Noah Perez	Sr
P	48	Tomas O'Halloran	So
LS	53	Blake Shirley	Sr
P	83	Elliot Huether	Sr
K	93	Everett Scott	Jr
K	95	Andrew Conrad	Sr
LS	97	Cole Walker	So

Head coach

- Blake Harrell

Coordinators/assistant coaches

- Jordan Davis – Offensive Coordinator/Quarterbacks
- Jordon Hankins – Defensive Coordinator/Linebackers
- Roy Tesh – Co-Defensive Coordinator/Defensive Line
- Julian Griffin – Running Backs
- Alex Huettel – Offensive Line/Run Game Coordinator
- Hunter MacKay – Tight Ends/Passing Game Coordinator
- Damon Magazu – Safeties
- Juan Soto – Wide Receivers
- Tarron Williams – Cornerbacks
- Rico Zackery – Outside Linebackers
- Bryan Butterworth – Nickels
- Ryan Smith – Special Teams Coordinator
- Ryan McManus – Senior Offensive Analyst
- Caedon Malone – Senior Defensive Analyst
- John Straniero – Senior Defensive Analyst
- Ayden Ressa – Offensive Graduate Assistant Coach
- Teagan Wilk – Defensive Graduate Assistant Coach/Recruiting
- Jordan Williams – Defensive Graduate Assistant Coach
- Lance Ware – Chief of Staff
- Steve Shankweiler – Director of High School & Alumni Relations/Special Assistant To Head Coach
- Devontay Love-Taylor – Director of Player Personnel/Recruiting and General Manager
- Lydia Brinkley – Director of Football Operations
- Brian Rucker – Director of Player Development
- Mason Baggett – Director, Strength and Conditioning
- Mark Hatcher – Recruiting Coordinator
- Taryn Smith – Director of On-Campus Recruiting
- Alex Johnson – Recruiting Graduate Assistant
- Ethan Key – Director of Scouting

Legend

- (C) Team captain
- (S) Suspended
- (I) Ineligible
- Injured
- Redshirt

Roster
Last update: 6/3/26

=== Transfers ===
==== Outgoing ====
Player	Position	Destination
Raheim Jeter	QB	Alcorn State
O'Marion Lewis	S	Campbell
Jyron Waiters	WR	Campbell
Jordy Lowery	CB	Florida
London Montgomery	RB	Florida
Desirrio Riles	TE	Florida State
Ja'Marley Riddle	S	Georgia
Katin Houser	QB	Illinois
Key Crowell	CB	Illinois State
Parker Jenkins	RB	Lamar
Leivi Semaia	IOL	Midwestern State
Jimarion McCrimon	OT	NC State
Justin Benton	DL	North Texas
Chaston Ditta	QB	North Texas
Dru McClough	IOL	Presbyterian
Yannick Smith	WR	SMU
Emmanuel Poku	IOL	South Carolina
Bernard Lackey Jr.	S	Southwest Mississippi Community College
Xavier McIver	DL	Southern Miss
Samuel Riddy Jr.	OT	UAB
Jayvontay Conner	TE	Vanderbilt
Zion Wilson	DL	Virginia
Kendric Davis	LB	West Georgia
Malik Leverett	WR	West Georgia
Daniel Baker	OL	Winston-Salem State
Eddie Love Jr.	RB	Unknown
Jonathan Stokes	OL	Unknown
Marcus Branthoover	OL	Unknown
Timothy Patterson	DB	Unknown
Trenton Cloud	WR	Withdrawn
Samuel Dankah	LB	Withdrawn

==== Incoming ====
Player	Position	Previous school
Zyeir Gamble	S	Appalachian State
Kanen Hamlett	TE	Appalachian State
Ashton Levells-Mitchell	CB	FIU
Ja'Keith Hamilton	WR	Furman
McCallum Wright	WR	Hampden–Sydney
Brandon Best	IOL	Kennesaw State
Rae'mon Mosby	CB	Louisville
Michael Allen	RB	Marshall
Cade Law	LB	Memphis
Crews Law	LB	Memphis
Myles Pollard	S	Memphis
Ray Ray Joseph	WR	Miami (FL)
Emory Williams	QB	Miami (FL)
Jaylen Bowden	CB	Minnesota
Ashton Gray	RB	North Texas
Landon Sides	WR	North Texas
Ethan Kramer	IOL	Northern Arizona
Hayes Creel	OT	Southern Miss
Elliot Huether	P	St. Thomas (MN)
Mitch Griffis	QB	Texas Tech
Christian Peterson	S	UCF
Ismael Smith Flores	TE	UT Rio Grande Valley
Niko Paic	IOL	Valparaiso
Jeremiah Melvin	WR	Wake Forest
Blake Shirley	LS	Wofford
