= 2026 Memphis Tigers football team =

American college football season

2026 Memphis Tigers football
- Conference: American Conference

Ranking
- AP: No. 24
- Record: 8–3 (5–2 American)
- Head coach: Charles Huff (1st season)
- Offensive coordinator: Kevin Decker (1st season)
- Co-offensive coordinator: David Weeks (1st season)
- Offensive scheme: Veer and shoot
- Defensive coordinator: Lance Guidry (1st season)
- Base defense: 4–2–5
- Home stadium: Simmons Bank Liberty Stadium

2026 American Conference football standings
	Conf.			Overall
Team	W		L	W		L
UTSA	6	–	1	9	–	2
Memphis	5	–	2	8	–	3
East Carolina	5	–	2	7	–	4
North Texas	5	–	2	7	–	4
UAB	4	–	3	6	–	5
Army	4	–	3	5	–	5
Tulsa	4	–	3	7	–	4
Florida Atlantic	4	–	3	7	–	4
Tulane	4	–	3	6	–	5
Navy	3	–	4	4	–	6
South Florida	2	–	5	6	–	5
Rice	1	–	6	2	–	9
Charlotte	1	–	6	1	–	10
Temple	1	–	6	2	–	9
Championship: December 5, 2026
As of November 22, 2026; Rankings from AP poll

The 2026 Memphis Tigers football team is the program that represents the University of Memphis as a member of the American Conference during the 2026 NCAA Division I FBS football season. Led by first-year head coach Charles Huff, the Tigers play their home games at Simmons Bank Liberty Stadium in Memphis, Tennessee.

== Schedule ==
Date	Time	Opponent	Site	TV	Result	Attendance
August 29	9:00 p.m.	at UNLV*	Allegiant Stadium; Paradise, NV	FOX	W 27–21	31,384
September 5	6:00 p.m.	Arkansas State*	Simmons Bank Liberty Stadium; Memphis, TN (Paint Bucket Bowl)	ESPN+	W 42–24	46,352
September 12	5:00 p.m.	at Boise State*	Albertsons Stadium; Boise, ID	USA	L 20–38	34,439
September 19	6:00 p.m.	UT Martin*	Simmons Bank Liberty Stadium; Memphis, TN	ESPN+	W 45–21	30,840
October 3	10:00 a.m.	at Charlotte	Jerry Richardson Stadium; Charlotte, NC	ESPN+	W 59–8	8,856
October 10	6:00 p.m.	UAB	Simmons Bank Liberty Stadium; Memphis, TN (Battle for the Bones)	ESPN2	W 38–13	30,322
October 16	6:30 p.m.	at Tulane	Yulman Stadium; New Orleans, LA	ESPN	L 17–31	20,083
October 22	6:30 p.m.	East Carolina	Simmons Bank Liberty Stadium; Memphis, TN	ESPN2	W 41–34 ^{OT}	27,788
October 31	7:00 p.m.	Army	Simmons Bank Liberty Stadium; Memphis, TN	ESPNU	W 49–22	32,502
November 12	7:00 p.m.	at South Florida	Raymond James Stadium; Tampa, FL	ESPN	W 52–41	
November 21	11:00 a.m.	at Navy	Navy–Marine Corps Memorial Stadium; Annapolis, MD	ESPN2	L 34–38	29,080
November 27	2:30 p.m.	Temple	Simmons Bank Liberty Stadium; Memphis, TN	ESPN		
*Non-conference game; All times are in Central time

== Rankings ==
Ranking movements Legend: ██ Increase in ranking ██ Decrease in ranking — = Not ranked RV = Received votes
	Week															
Poll	Pre	1	2	3	4	5	6	7	8	9	10	11	12	13	14	Final
AP	RV	RV	—	—	—	—	—	—	—	—	—	24				
Coaches	RV	RV	—	—	—	—	RV	—	—	RV	—	RV				
CFP	Not released									—	—	—				Not released

== Game summaries ==
=== at UNLV ===
Memphis Tigers (0–0) at UNLV Rebels (0–0) – Game summary

Quarter	1	2	3	4	Total
Tigers	0	7	17	3	27
Rebels	0	14	7	0	21

at Allegiant Stadium • Paradise, Nevada

- Date: August 29
- Game time: 9:00 p.m. CDT
- Game weather: none (played indoors)
- Game attendance: 31,384
- Referee: Christian Watson
- TV announcers (FOX): Tim Brando, Devin Gardner and Josh Sims

Game information

First quarter

- No scoring plays.

Second quarter

- UNLV – Tavian McNair 38-yard pass from Jackson Arnold (Ramon Villela kick), 8:14. Rebels 7–0. Drive: 9 plays, 86 yards, 4:30.
- MEM – Hunter Tipton 16-yard pass from Marcus Stokes (Philippe Laforge kick), 5:24. Tied 7–7. Drive: 7 plays, 75 yards, 2:50.
- UNLV – Jackson Arnold 6-yard run (Ramon Villela kick), 1:56. Rebels 14–7. Drive: 8 plays, 75 yards, 3:28.

Third quarter

- MEM – Stonka Burnside 48-yard pass from Marcus Stokes (Philippe Laforge kick), 13:07. Tied 14–14. Drive: 5 plays, 70 yards, 1:46.
- UNLV – Kayden McGee 22-yard pass from Jackson Arnold (Ramon Villela kick), 10:15. Rebels 21–14. Drive: 6 plays, 85 yards, 2:48.
- MEM – Jaylin Carter 36-yard run (Philippe Laforge kick), 8:38. Tied 21–21. Drive: 3 plays, 57 yards, 1:30.
- MEM – Philippe Laforge 32-yard field goal, 0:43. Tigers 24–21. Drive: 9 plays, 53 yards, 2:27.

Fourth quarter

- MEM – Philippe Laforge 36-yard field goal, 12:11. Tigers 27–21. Drive: 8 plays, 58 yards, 2:40.

Statistics	MEM	UNLV
First downs	20	23
Plays–yards	60–418	79–460
Rushes–yards	34–195	41–169
Passing yards	223	291
Passing: comp–att–int	15–26–0	25–38–0
Turnovers	1	0
Time of possession	24:51	35:09

Team	Category	Player	Statistics
Memphis	Passing	Marcus Stokes	15/26, 223 yards, 2 TD
Memphis	Rushing	Jaylin Carter	15 carries, 97 yards, TD
Memphis	Receiving	Jemyri Davis	3 receptions, 62 yards
UNLV	Passing	Jackson Arnold	25/37, 291 yards, 2 TD
UNLV	Rushing	Jackson Arnold	21 carries, 54 yards, TD
UNLV	Receiving	Jai'Den Thomas	6 receptions, 54 yards

=== Arkansas State (Paint Bucket Bowl) ===
Arkansas State Red Wolves (0–0) at Memphis Tigers (1–0) – Game summary

Quarter	1	2	3	4	Total
Red Wolves	3	14	7	0	24
Tigers	0	21	14	7	42

at Simmons Bank Liberty Stadium • Memphis, Tennessee

- Date: September 5
- Game time: 6:00 p.m. CDT
- Game weather: Sunny • Temperature: 99 °F (37 °C) • Wind: E at 6 miles per hour (9.7 km/h)
- Game attendance: 45,632
- Referee: Steven Robinson
- TV announcers (ESPN+): Jeff Hem (play-by-play) and Kenechi Udeze (analyst)

Game information

First quarter

- ARST – Clune Van Andel 48-yard field goal, 1:44. Red Wolves 3–0. Drive: 6 plays, 5 yards, 3:42.

Second quarter

- MEM – Jaylin Carter 2-yard run (Philippe Laforge kick), 12:02. Tigers 7–3. Drive: 10 plays, 75 yards, 4:41.
- ARST – Kenyon Clay 1-yard run (Clune Van Andel kick), 7:42. Red Wolves 10–7. Drive: 8 plays, 75 yards, 4:20.
- MEM – Aidan O'Callaghan 7-yard pass from Marcus Stokes (Philippe Laforge kick), 3:37. Tigers 14–10. Drive: 9 plays, 85 yards, 4:01.
- ARST – Kenyon Clay 75-yard pass from Trey Owens (Clune Van Andel kick), 3:26. Red Wolves 17–14. Drive: 1 play, 75 yards, 0:11.
- MEM – Jermane Hayes 31-yard pass from Marcus Stokes (Philippe Laforge kick), 0:40. Tigers 21–17. Drive: 7 plays, 75 yards, 2:46.

Third quarter

- MEM – Jaylin Carter 13-yard run (Philippe Laforge kick), 12:19. Tigers 28–17. Drive: 6 plays, 75 yards, 2:41.
- ARST – Timothy Carter 1-yard run (Clune Van Andel kick), 4:12. Tigers 28–24. Drive: 5 plays, 72 yards, 2:04.
- MEM – Jaylin Carter 74-yard run (Philippe Laforge kick), 3:25. Tigers 35–24. Drive: 2 plays, 84 yards, 0:41.

Fourth quarter

- MEM – Jaylin Carter 24-yard run (Philippe Laforge kick), 3:31. Tigers 42–24. Drive: 8 plays, 67 yards, 4:42.

Statistics	ARST	MEM
First downs	22	24
Plays–yards	59–434	63–523
Rushes–yards	29–109	48–335
Passing yards	325	188
Passing: comp–att–int	21–30–4	12–15–2
Turnovers	4	2
Time of possession	30:33	29:27

Team	Category	Player	Statistics
Arkansas State	Passing	Trey Owens	21/30, 325 yards, TD, 4 INT
Arkansas State	Rushing	Kenyon Clay	13 carries, 50 yards, TD
Arkansas State	Receiving	Hunter Summers	5 receptions, 98 yards
Memphis	Passing	Marcus Stokes	12/15, 188 yards, 2 TD, 2 INT
Memphis	Rushing	Jaylin Carter	19 carries, 183 yards, 4 TD
Memphis	Receiving	Brady Kluse	1 reception, 40 yards

=== at Boise State ===
Memphis Tigers (2–0) at Boise State Broncos (0–1) – Game summary

Quarter	1	2	3	4	Total
Tigers	7	13	0	0	20
Broncos	3	14	14	7	38

at Albertsons Stadium • Boise, Idaho

- Date: September 12
- Game time: 5:00 p.m. CDT
- Game weather: Sunny
- Game attendance: 34,439
- Referee: Chris Snead
- TV announcers (USA Network): Nate Gatter, Ryan Leaf and Lauren Green

Game information

First quarter

- BOIS – Canaan Moore 39-yard pass field goal, 9:37. Broncos 3–0. Drive: 12 plays, 53 yards, 5:23.
- MEM - Hunter Tipton 87-yard pass from Marcus Stokes (Philippe Laforge kick), 2:14. Tigers 7-3. Drive: 2 plays, 87 yards, 0:20.

Second quarter

- MEM – Philippe Laforge 33-yard field goal, 9:33. Tigers 10–3. Drive: 6 plays, 83 yards, 2:53.
- MEM – Jaylin Carter 80-yard pass run (Philippe Laforge kick), 7:10. Tigers 17–3. Drive: 1 play, 80 yards, 0:13.
- BOIS – Akeem Wright 37-yard pass from Maddux Madsen (Canaan Moore kick), 2:28. Tigers 17–10. Drive: 8 plays, 75 yards, 4:42.
- BOIS – Rasean Jones 19-yard run (Canaan Moore kick), 1:07. Tied 17–17. Drive: 2 plays, 90 yards, 0:46.
- MEM - Philippe Laforge 36-yard field goal, 0:00. Tigers 20-17. Drive: 7 plays, 57 yards, 1:07.

Third quarter

- BOIS – Sire Gaines 11-yard run (Canaan Moore kick), 8:06. Broncos 24-20. Drive: 10 plays, 77 yards, 4:53.
- BOIS – Cam Bates 72-yard punt return (Canaan Moore kick), 6:27. Broncos 31–20. Drive: 3 plays, 4 yards, 1:39.

Fourth quarter

- BOIS – Maddux Madsen 1-yard run (Canaan Moore kick), 13:30. Broncos 38–20. Drive: 10 plays, 98 yards, 5:30.

Statistics	MEM	BOIS
First downs	17	28
Plays–yards	52–519	75–578
Rushes–yards	26–135	47–357
Passing yards	384	221
Passing: comp–att–int	17–26–1	17–28–0
Turnovers	1	0
Time of possession	20:04	39:56

Team	Category	Player	Statistics
Memphis	Passing	Marcus Stokes	17/25, 384 yards, TD, INT
Memphis	Rushing	Jaylin Carter	9 carries, 95 yards, TD
Memphis	Receiving	Hunter Tipton	9 receptions, 229 yards, TD
Boise State	Passing	Maddux Madsen	17/28, 221 yards, TD
Boise State	Rushing	Dylan Riley	19 carries, 206 yards
Boise State	Receiving	Akeem Wright	4 receptions, 84 yards, TD

=== UT Martin (FCS) ===
UT Martin Skyhawks (FCS) (1–2) at Memphis Tigers (2–1) – Game summary

Quarter	1	2	3	4	Total
Skyhawks (FCS)	0	7	0	14	21
Tigers	10	14	7	14	45

at Simmons Bank Liberty Stadium • Memphis, Tennessee

- Date: September 19
- Game time: 6:00 p.m. CDT
- Game weather: Sunny • Temperature: 96 °F (36 °C) • Wind: SW at 4 miles per hour (6.4 km/h)
- Game attendance: 30,840
- Referee: Justin Ackley
- TV announcers (ESPN+): Jeff Hem (play-by-play) and Doc Holliday (analyst)

Statistics	UTM	MEM
First downs	14	28
Plays–yards	57–291	75–572
Rushes–yards	28–114	40–299
Passing yards	177	273
Passing: comp–att–int	17–29–0	28–35–1
Turnovers	0	1
Time of possession	28:46	31:14

Team	Category	Player	Statistics
UT Martin	Passing	Tate Surber	17/29, 177 yards, 2 TD
UT Martin	Rushing	Jaydon Peete	6 carries, 38 yards
UT Martin	Receiving	Deuce Oliver	4 receptions, 69 yards
Memphis	Passing	Marcus Stokes	26/32, 258 yards, 4 TD
Memphis	Rushing	Jordan Thompson	6 carries, 110 yards, TD
Memphis	Receiving	Jermane Hayes	8 receptions, 57 yards

=== at Charlotte ===
Memphis Tigers (3–1) at Charlotte 49ers (0–4) – Game summary

Quarter	1	2	Total
Tigers			0
49ers			0

at Jerry Richardson Stadium • Charlotte, North Carolina

- Date: October 3
- Game time: 10:00 a.m. CDT
- Game attendance: 8,856
- TV: ESPN+

Statistics	MEM	CLT
First downs		
Plays–yards		
Rushes–yards		
Passing yards		
Passing: comp–att–int		
Time of possession		

Team	Category	Player	Statistics
Memphis	Passing		
Memphis	Rushing		
Memphis	Receiving		
Charlotte	Passing		
Charlotte	Rushing		
Charlotte	Receiving		

=== UAB (Battle for the Bones) ===
UAB Blazers (3–2) at Memphis Tigers (4–1) – Game summary

Quarter	1	2	Total
Blazers			0
Tigers			0

at Simmons Bank Liberty Stadium • Memphis, Tennessee

- Date: October 10
- Game time: 6:00 p.m. CDT
- Game attendance: 30,322
- TV: ESPN2

Statistics	UAB	MEM
First downs		
Plays–yards		
Rushes–yards		
Passing yards		
Passing: comp–att–int		
Time of possession		

Team	Category	Player	Statistics
UAB	Passing		
UAB	Rushing		
UAB	Receiving		
Memphis	Passing		
Memphis	Rushing		
Memphis	Receiving		

=== at Tulane ===
Memphis Tigers (5–1) at Tulane Green Wave (2–3) – Game summary

Quarter	1	2	Total
Tigers			0
Green Wave			0

at Yulman Stadium • New Orleans, Louisiana

- Date: October 16
- Game time: 6:30 p.m. CDT
- Game attendance: 20,083
- TV: ESPN

Statistics	MEM	TULN
First downs		
Plays–yards		
Rushes–yards		
Passing yards		
Passing: comp–att–int		
Time of possession		

Team	Category	Player	Statistics
Memphis	Passing		
Memphis	Rushing		
Memphis	Receiving		
Tulane	Passing		
Tulane	Rushing		
Tulane	Receiving		

=== East Carolina ===
East Carolina Pirates (3–3) at Memphis Tigers (5–2) – Game summary

Quarter	1	2	Total
Pirates			0
Tigers			0

at Simmons Bank Liberty Stadium • Memphis, Tennessee

- Date: October 22
- Game time: 6:30 p.m. CDT
- Game attendance: 27,788
- TV announcers (ESPN2): Matt Barrie (play-by-play), Chase Daniel (analyst) and Paul Carcaterra (sideline)

Statistics	ECU	MEM
First downs		
Plays–yards		
Rushes–yards		
Passing yards		
Passing: comp–att–int		
Time of possession		

Team	Category	Player	Statistics
East Carolina	Passing		
East Carolina	Rushing		
East Carolina	Receiving		
Memphis	Passing		
Memphis	Rushing		
Memphis	Receiving		

=== Army ===
Army Black Knights (5–2) at Memphis Tigers (6–2) – Game summary

Quarter	1	2	Total
Black Knights			0
Tigers			0

at Simmons Bank Liberty Stadium • Memphis, Tennessee

- Date: October 31
- Game time: 7:00 p.m. CDT
- Game attendance: 32,502
- TV: ESPNU

Statistics	ARMY	MEM
First downs		
Plays–yards		
Rushes–yards		
Passing yards		
Passing: comp–att–int		
Time of possession		

Team	Category	Player	Statistics
Army	Passing		
Army	Rushing		
Army	Receiving		
Memphis	Passing		
Memphis	Rushing		
Memphis	Receiving		

=== at South Florida ===
Memphis Tigers (7–2) at South Florida Bulls (6–3) – Game summary

Quarter	1	2	Total
Tigers			0
Bulls			0

at Raymond James Stadium • Tampa, Florida

- Date: November 12
- Game time: 7:00 p.m. CST
- TV: ESPN

Statistics	MEM	USF
First downs		
Plays–yards		
Rushes–yards		
Passing yards		
Passing: comp–att–int		
Time of possession		

Team	Category	Player	Statistics
Memphis	Passing		
Memphis	Rushing		
Memphis	Receiving		
South Florida	Passing		
South Florida	Rushing		
South Florida	Receiving		

=== at Navy ===
Memphis Tigers (8–2) at Navy Midshipmen (3–6) – Game summary

Quarter	1	2	Total
Tigers			0
Midshipmen			0

at Navy–Marine Corps Memorial Stadium • Annapolis, Maryland

- Date: November 21
- Game time: 11:00 a.m. CST
- TV announcers (ESPN): Anish Shroff, Andre Ware, and Morgan Uber

Statistics	MEM	NAVY
First downs		
Plays–yards		
Rushes–yards		
Passing yards		
Passing: comp–att–int		
Time of possession		

Team	Category	Player	Statistics
Memphis	Passing		
Memphis	Rushing		
Memphis	Receiving		
Navy	Passing		
Navy	Rushing		
Navy	Receiving		

=== Temple ===
Temple Owls (2–9) at Memphis Tigers (8–3) – Game summary

Quarter	1	2	Total
Owls			0
Tigers			0

at Simmons Bank Liberty Stadium • Memphis, Tennessee

- Date: November 28
- Game time: TBD

Statistics	TEM	MEM
First downs		
Plays–yards		
Rushes–yards		
Passing yards		
Passing: comp–att–int		
Time of possession		

Team	Category	Player	Statistics
Temple	Passing		
Temple	Rushing		
Temple	Receiving		
Memphis	Passing		
Memphis	Rushing		
Memphis	Receiving		

== Roster ==
2026 Memphis Tigers football team roster
Players
Coaches
Offense

Pos.	#	Name	Class
TE	0	Hunter Tipton	RSr
WR	1	Tychaun Chapman	RSr
QB	2	Marcus Stokes	RJr
QB	3	Air Noland	RSo
WR	4	Terrell Timmons Jr.	RSr
WR	5	Stonka Burnside	RSo
RB	6	Jaylin Carter	So
RB	7	Dallan Hayden	RSr
WR	8	Bryce Dorsey	RSo
QB	9	Denzel Gardner	RFr
TE	10	TJ Johnson	RJr
WR	11	Jermane Hayes	So
WR	12	Brady Kluse	Jr
WR	13	Jemyri Davis	RJr
TE	14	Aidan O'Callaghan	RSo
QB	15	Gavin Owens	Fr
QB	16	Grant Troutman	RFr
WR	17	Alante Brown	GS
WR	19	Jaylin Taylor	Fr
WR	21	Zechariah Jenkins	Fr
RB	22	Eric Perry	Fr
RB	23	Jordan Thompson	Fr
RB	28	Manny Covey	RJr
RB	30	Isaiah McGill	RFr
OL	50	Koby Keenum	RJr
OL	55	Maarten Woudsma	RSr
OL	56	Jordan Foy	Jr
OL	58	Bryce Vaughn	RFr
OL	59	Aaron Karas	RSr
OL	66	Carde Smith	RFr
OL	70	Jabarius Oliver	So
OL	71	Xavier Allen	Sr
OL	72	Eddie Alford	Fr
OL	73	Phillip Gray	RSr
OL	74	Richard Thigpen	Fr
OL	75	Skyler Grant	GS
OL	76	Parker Mitchell	RSr
OL	77	Brian Grant	RSr
OL	78	Riley McGehee	Jr
OL	79	Chance Holloman	RSr
WR	80	Joshua Joseph	Fr
TE	81	Marshall Smith Jr.	Fr
WR	82	Justice Spann	RSo
WR	85	Jamar Jenkins	RFr
TE	86	Jonathan Harding	RFr
TE	87	Garrett Essner	Fr

Defense

Pos.	#	Name	Class
S	0	Ian Foster	RJr
CB	1	Ellis Ellis Jr.	RSr
CB	2	Chauncey Logan Jr.	RSr
S	3	Dylan Smith	RJr
DL	4	Joseph Head Jr.	RJr
S	5	Ahmere Foster	Sr
S	6	Dylan King	RSr
CB	7	Darius Malcolm Jr.	RSo
CB	8	Anthony Richard Jr.	GS
LB	9	Mike Montgomery	Sr
DL	10	Justin Wallace	RSr
DL	11	Jaden McKinney	Sr
S	12	Beni Mwamba	Jr
DL	13	Stone Chaney	RSo
DL	14	J'Mond Tapp	RSr
DL	15	Elijah Kinsler	RSo
LB	16	Jah'keevi Garnett	Jr
S	17	Chase Pinkston	RSo
DL	18	Xavier Miles	RJr
CB	19	Ethan Wilder	RSo
S	21	Khalil Foster	RFr
LB	22	Zach Ruffin	So
LB	23	Jayden Parrish	RSo
S	24	Nick Burden	Fr
LB	25	JJ Clayton	So
CB	26	Jaylen Lewis	RFr
S	27	Jordan Bell	RSo
CB	28	Dilan Williamson	RSr
S	29	Tim Sims	Fr
CB	31	Johnny Moody	Fr
S	32	Charlie Harrell	RJr
LB	33	Donovan Mathena	RSr
LB	34	Kadan Spratling	Fr
DL	35	Deangelo Thompson Jr.	RFr
S	36	Jamariez Robinson	RSo
LB	37	Jacory Johnson	RSo
CB	38	Xavier Thompson	RFr
LB	39	Desmond Cox	Fr
LB	40	Trey McDonald	GS
LB	41	Tylon Nash	RSr
LB	42	Christian Thatcher	RFr
LB	43	Wolf Walker	RFr
DL	44	Evan Harvey	Fr
DL	45	Gary Green	Jr
LB	46	Elijah Fernandez	Fr
CB	49	Josiah Brown	Fr
DL	54	Amir Leonard-Jean Charles	RFr
DL	56	KJ Miles	RSr
DL	90	Taylor Burton	Sr
DL	92	JaQuentin Madison	RFr
DL	93	Jabari Ishmael	RSr
DL	94	J'Mari Monette	RSr
DL	95	Eric Thomas	RFr
DL	97	Jacari Gatling	RFr
DL	99	Devan Lowe	Sr

Special teams

Pos.	#	Name	Class
P	30	Harrison Tuck	Sr
P	32	Jake Snyder	Fr
K	33	Oliver Castaneda	RSo
LS	42	Ben Majors	Fr
K	47	Tarik Ahmetbasic	RJr
LS	54	Weston Simmons	RJr
K	80	Philippe Laforge	So

Head coach

- Charles Huff

Coordinators/assistant coaches

- Telly Lockette – Assistant Head Coach / Running Backs Coach
- Kevin Decker – Offensive Coordinator / Quarterbacks Coach
- Lance Guidry – Defensive Coordinator / Linebackers Coach
- David Weeks – Co-Offensive Coordinator / Tight Ends Coach
- Tim Conner – Special Teams Coordinator
- Andy Kwon – Offensive Line Coach
- Aaron Dobson – Wide Receivers Coach
- Eric Mathies – Defensive Line Coach
- Dominique Bowman – Defensive Backs / Safeties Coach
- Tim Duffie – Defensive Backs / Cornerbacks Coach
- Mac Goode – Assistant Linebackers Coach
- Sharrod Everett – Chief of Staff / Chief Operating Officer
- Corey Phillips – General Manager
- Reed Grable – Assistant General Manager
- Kate Roll – Director of Football Administration / Head Coach Operations
- Ben Ashford – Director of Football Athletic Performance
- Drew White – Assistant Director of Athletic Performance
- Qua Scott – Assistant Strength & Conditioning Coach
- Aaron Estes – Head Football Athletic Trainer
- Michelle Gersuk – Associate Athletic Trainer
- Lorenzo Soto – Associate Director, Sports Medicine
- Joseph Hulefeld – Assistant Athletic Trainer
- Ethan Ajeska – Athletic Training Fellow
- Jack Jacoby – Director of Player Personnel
- Baker Parrish – Assistant Director of Player Personnel
- Mat Rumshock – Director of Football Technology
- Rodney Saulsberry, Sr. – Director of Player Development & High School Relations
- Akiliyah Sumlin – Director of Recruiting
- Marc Hohorst – Equipment Manager
- Ezra McElroy – Assistant Equipment Manager
- Janasia Phillips – Director of Football Nutrition
- Brian Braswell – Senior Offensive Analyst
- Matt Harper – Senior Special Teams Analyst
- Kerry Joseph – Senior Defensive Analyst
- Eli Altizer – Offensive Analyst / Tight Ends
- Torrence Brown – Defensive Analyst / Defensive Line
- Drew Chance – Offensive Analyst / Quarterbacks
- Ryan Favre – Offensive Analyst / Offensive Line
- Preston Grim – Offensive Analyst
- Trent Holler – Offensive Analyst / Offensive Line
- Connor Ingram – Special Teams Analyst
- Rodney Saulsberry, Jr. – Defensive Analyst / Defensive Backs
- Blaine Suprean – Offensive Analyst / Wide Receivers

Legend

- (C) Team captain
- (S) Suspended
- (I) Ineligible
- Injured
- Redshirt

Roster
