= 2026 Charlotte 49ers football team =

American college football season

2026 Charlotte 49ers football
- Conference: American Conference
- Record: 1–10 (1–6 American)
- Head coach: Tim Albin (2nd season)
- Offensive coordinator: Todd Fitch (2nd season)
- Offensive scheme: Spread option
- Defensive coordinator: Nate Faanes (2nd season)
- Base defense: 4–2–5
- Home stadium: Jerry Richardson Stadium

2026 American Conference football standings
	Conf.			Overall
Team	W		L	W		L
UTSA	6	–	1	9	–	2
Memphis	5	–	2	8	–	3
East Carolina	5	–	2	7	–	4
North Texas	5	–	2	7	–	4
UAB	4	–	3	6	–	5
Army	4	–	3	5	–	5
Tulsa	4	–	3	7	–	4
Florida Atlantic	4	–	3	7	–	4
Tulane	4	–	3	6	–	5
Navy	3	–	4	4	–	6
South Florida	2	–	5	6	–	5
Rice	1	–	6	2	–	9
Charlotte	1	–	6	1	–	10
Temple	1	–	6	2	–	9
Championship: December 5, 2026
As of November 22, 2026; Rankings from AP poll

The 2026 Charlotte 49ers football team represents the University of North Carolina at Charlotte as a member of the American Conference during 2026 NCAA Division I FBS football season. They are led by second-year head coach Tim Albin and play their home games at Jerry Richardson Stadium in Charlotte, North Carolina.

== Schedule ==
Date	Time	Opponent	Site	TV	Result	Attendance
September 5	3:30 p.m.	The Citadel*	Jerry Richardson Stadium; Charlotte, North Carolina	ESPN+	L 41–43 ^{3OT}	13,274
September 12	7:45 p.m.	at No. 9 Ole Miss*	Vaught–Hemingway Stadium; Oxford, Mississippi	ESPN2	L 9–41	68,134
September 19	6:00 p.m.	at Appalachian State*	Kidd Brewer Stadium; Boone, North Carolina	ESPN+	L 21–26	28,296
September 26	6:30 p.m.	Louisiana*	Jerry Richardson Stadium; Charlotte, North Carolina	ESPN+	L 7–34	14,311
October 3	11:00 a.m.	Memphis^{†}	Jerry Richardson Stadium; Charlotte, North Carolina	ESPN+	L 8–59	8,856
October 10	3:30 p.m.	at North Texas	DATCU Stadium; Denton, Texas	ESPN+	L 10–50	17,411
October 17	1:00 p.m.	at Temple	Lincoln Financial Field; Philadelphia, Pennsylvania	ESPN+	W 38–31	11,589
October 30	7:00 p.m.	Tulane	Jerry Richardson Stadium; Charlotte, North Carolina	ESPN2	L 31–38 ^{OT}	8,106
November 7	3:30 p.m.	at UAB	Protective Stadium; Birmingham, Alabama	ESPN+	L 12–23	17,931
November 14	1:00 p.m.	East Carolina	Jerry Richardson Stadium; Charlotte, North Carolina	ESPN+	L 16–17	13,209
November 21	2:00 p.m.	at Tulsa	H.A. Chapman Stadium; Tulsa, Oklahoma	ESPN+	L 14–42	13,686
November 28	12:00 p.m.	Navy	Jerry Richardson Stadium; Charlotte, North Carolina	ESPN+		
*Non-conference game; ^{†}Homecoming; Rankings from AP Poll - Released prior to game; All times are in Eastern time

== Game summaries ==
=== The Citadel (FCS) ===
The Citadel Bulldogs (FCS) (0–1) at Charlotte 49ers (0–0) – Game summary

Quarter	1	2	3	4	OT	2OT	3OT	Total
Bulldogs (FCS)	7	0	14	7	7	6	2	43
49ers	7	7	7	7	7	6	0	41

at Jerry Richardson Stadium • Charlotte, North Carolina

- Date: September 5
- Game time: 3:30 p.m. EDT
- Game weather: Cloudy, 96 °F (36 °C)
- Game attendance: 13,274
- Referee: Tim Rich
- TV announcers (ESPN+): Tom Werme and Reginald Walker Jr.
- Box score, Recap

Game information
First quarter
- CIT – Gavin Garcia 2-yard run (Evan Kiely kick), 7:23. Bulldogs 7–0. Drive: 5 plays, 48 yards, 2:20.
- CLT – Khamani Alexander 66-yard run (Ian Kelly kick), 6:03. Tied 7–7. Drive: 3 plays, 75 yards, 1:20.

Second quarter

- CLT – Derrick Eley 43-yard pass from Cole Gonzales (Ian Kelly kick), 5:47. 49ers 14–7. Drive: 4 plays, 72 yards, 2:00.

Third quarter

- CIT – Sebastian Boyle 56-yard run (Evan Kiely kick), 12:48. Tied 14–14. Drive: 4 plays, 75 yards, 2:12.
- CLT – Cole Gonzales 11-yard run (Ian Kelly kick), 7:38. 49ers 21–14. Drive: 8 plays, 62 yards, 5:07.
- CIT – Gavin Garcia 1-yard run (Evan Kiely kick), 1:32. Tied 21–21. Drive: 10 plays, 75 yards, 6:06.

Fourth quarter

- CIT – Nick Billoups 2-yard run (Evan Kiely kick), 12:11. Bulldogs 28–21. Drive: 6 plays, 35 yards, 3:08.
- CLT – Jaylen Hampton 6-yard pass from Cole Gonzales (Ian Kelly kick), 0:24. Tied 28–28. Drive: 14 plays, 72 yards, 3:10.

Overtime

- CIT – Gavin Garcia 25-yard run (Evan Kiely kick). Bulldogs 35–28. Drive: 2 plays, 25 yards.
- CLT – Cole Gonzales 8-yard run (Ian Kelly kick). Tied 35–35. Drive: 4 plays, 25 yards.

Second overtime

- CLT – Jaylen Hampton 18-yard pass from Cole Gonzales (pass failed). 49ers 41–35. Drive: 2 plays, 25 yards.
- CIT – Nick Billoups 2-yard run (run failed). Tied 41–41. Drive: 5 plays, 25 yards.

Third overtime

- CIT – Whit Hobgood two-point pass from Nick Billoups. Bulldogs 43–41.

Statistics	CIT	CLT
First downs	16	21
Plays–yards	63–400	74–538
Rushes–yards	50–268	33–216
Passing yards	132	322
Passing: comp–att–int	9–13–0	28–41–2
Turnovers	0	2
Time of possession	29:45	30:15

Team	Category	Player	Statistics
The Citadel	Passing	Nick Billoups	7/10, 91 yards
The Citadel	Rushing	Gavin Garcia	21 carries, 137 yards, 3 TD
The Citadel	Receiving	Ismael Zamor	3 receptions, 56 yards
Charlotte	Passing	Cole Gonzales	28/41, 322 yards, 3 TD, 2 INT
Charlotte	Rushing	Khamani Alexander	14 carries, 138 yards, TD
Charlotte	Receiving	Jaylen Hampton	8 receptions, 117 yards, 2 TD

=== at No. 9 Ole Miss ===
Charlotte 49ers (0–1) at No. 9 Ole Miss Rebels (1–0) – Game summary

Quarter	1	2	3	4	Total
49ers	0	0	6	3	9
No. 9 Rebels	7	20	0	14	41

at Vaught–Hemingway Stadium • Oxford, Mississippi

- Date: September 12
- Game time: 7:45 p.m. EDT / 6:45 p.m. CDT
- Game weather: Cloudy • Temperature: 81 °F (27 °C) • Wind: S at 2 miles per hour (3.2 km/h)
- Game attendance: 68,134
- Referee: Jeff Heaser
- TV announcers (ESPN2): Roy Philpott, Brock Osweiler and Lauren Sisler

Game information

First quarter

- MISS – Kewan Lacy 9-yard run (Lucas Carneiro kick), 10:39. Rebels 7–0. Drive: 10 plays, 75 yards, 4:21.

Second quarter

- MISS – Johntay Cook II 14-yard pass from Trinidad Chambliss (Lucas Carneiro kick), 13:55. Rebels 14–0. Drive: 7 plays, 67 yards, 2:40.
- MISS – Kewan Lacy 2-yard run (Lucas Carneiro kick), 8:39. Rebels 21–0. Drive: 8 plays, 74 yards, 3:16.
- MISS – Lucas Carneiro 57-yard field goal, 4:32. Rebels 24–0. Drive: 6 plays, 15 yards, 2:37.
- MISS – Lucas Carneiro 41-yard field goal, 0:00. Rebels 27–0. Drive: 2 plays, 14 yards, 0:04.

Third quarter

- CLT – Ian Kelly 28-yard field goal, 10:23. Rebels 27–3. Drive: 8 plays, 64 yards, 4:37.
- CLT – Ian Kelly 24-yard field goal, 1:43. Rebels 27–6. Drive: 12 plays, 59 yards, 6:49.

Fourth quarter

- MISS – Horatio Fields 9-yard pass from Trinidad Chambliss (Lucas Carneiro kick), 14:49. Rebels 34–6. Drive: 7 plays, 75 yards, 1:54.
- CLT – Ian Kelly 28-yard field goal, 9:53. Rebels 34–9. Drive: 8 plays, 64 yards, 4:56.
- MISS – Deuce Knight 7-yard run (Lucas Carneiro kick), 7:10. Rebels 41–9. Drive: 8 plays, 70 yards, 2:37.

Statistics	CLT	MISS
First downs	17	25
Plays–yards	61–322	58–420
Rushes–yards	33–143	24–127
Passing yards	179	293
Passing: comp–att–int	20–28–1	27–34–1
Turnovers	1	1
Time of possession	37:14	22:46

Team	Category	Player	Statistics
Charlotte	Passing	Cole Gonzales	14/21, 128 yards, INT
Charlotte	Rushing	Chance Williams	9 carries, 74 yards
Charlotte	Receiving	Derrick Eley	2 receptions, 56 yards
Ole Miss	Passing	Trinidad Chambliss	23/26, 225 yards, 2 TD
Ole Miss	Rushing	Kewan Lacy	13 carries, 87 yards, 2 TD
Ole Miss	Receiving	Deuce Alexander	8 receptions, 76 yards

=== at Appalachian State ===
Charlotte 49ers (0–2) at Appalachian State Mountaineers (2–0) – Game summary

Quarter	1	2	3	4	Total
49ers	0	7	0	14	21
Mountaineers	3	10	6	7	26

at Kidd Brewer Stadium • Boone, North Carolina

- Date: September 19
- Game time: 6:00 p.m. EDT
- Game weather: Cloudy
- Game attendance: 28,296
- Referee: Reid Jackson
- TV announcers (ESPN+): David Jackson (play-by-play) and Avery Hall (analyst)

Game information

First quarter

- APP – James Landon 41-yard field goal, 9:50. Mountaineers 3–0. Drive: 6 plays, 41 yards, 2:00.

Second quarter

- APP – Jaquari Lewis 2-yard run (James London kick), 4:34. Mountaineers 10–0. Drive: 14 plays, 74 yards, 6:52.
- CLT – Khamani Alexander 1-yard run (Ian Kelly kick), 0:35. Mountaineers 10–7. Drive: 8 plays, 68 yards, 1:11.
- APP – James London 47-yard field goal, 0:00. Mountaineers 13–7. Drive: 5 plays, 46 yards, 0:35.

Third quarter

- APP – Chris Lofton 3-yard pass from Malachi Singleton (pass failed), 4:28. Mountaineers 19–7. Drive: 4 plays, 27 yards, 2:02.

Fourth quarter

- APP – Jackson Grier 7-yard pass from Malachi Singleton (James London kick), 12:08. Mountaineers 26–7. Drive: 12 plays, 74 yards, 4:59.
- CLT – Khamani Alexander 1-yard run (Khamani Alexander run), 7:00. Mountaineers 26–15. Drive: 12 plays, 75 yards, 5:08.
- CLT – Collin Gill 36-yard interception return (pass failed), 1:58. Mountaineers 26–21. Drive: 3 plays, -5 yards, 0:19.

Statistics	CLT	APP
First downs	15	22
Plays–yards	60–247	76–435
Rushes–yards	25–36	33–90
Passing yards	211	345
Passing: comp–att–int	22–35–2	29–43–1
Turnovers	2	2
Time of possession	26:32	33:28

Team	Category	Player	Statistics
Charlotte	Passing	Cole Gonzales	22/35, 211 yards, 2 INT
Charlotte	Rushing	Henry Rutledge	7 carries, 29 yards
Charlotte	Receiving	Jaden Barnes	10 receptions, 97 yards
Appalachian State	Passing	Malachi Singleton	28/42, 331 yards, 2 TD, INT
Appalachian State	Rushing	Jaquari Lewis	11 carries, 46 yards, TD
Appalachian State	Receiving	Chris Lofton	6 receptions, 90 yards, TD

=== Louisiana ===
Louisiana Ragin' Cajuns (2–1) at Charlotte 49ers (0–3) – Game summary

Quarter	1	2	Total
Ragin' Cajuns			0
49ers			0

at Jerry Richardson Stadium • Charlotte, North Carolina

- Date: September 26
- Game time: 6:30 p.m. EDT
- TV announcers (ESPN+): Tom Werme and Reginald Walker Jr.

Statistics	LA	CLT
First downs		
Plays–yards		
Rushes–yards		
Passing yards		
Passing: comp–att–int		
Time of possession		

Team	Category	Player	Statistics
Louisiana	Passing		
Louisiana	Rushing		
Louisiana	Receiving		
Charlotte	Passing		
Charlotte	Rushing		
Charlotte	Receiving		

=== Memphis ===
Memphis Tigers (3–1) at Charlotte 49ers (0–4) – Game summary

Quarter	1	2	Total
Tigers			0
49ers			0

at Jerry Richardson Stadium • Charlotte, North Carolina

- Date: October 3
- Game time: TBD

Statistics	MEM	CLT
First downs		
Plays–yards		
Rushes–yards		
Passing yards		
Passing: comp–att–int		
Time of possession		

Team	Category	Player	Statistics
Memphis	Passing		
Memphis	Rushing		
Memphis	Receiving		
Charlotte	Passing		
Charlotte	Rushing		
Charlotte	Receiving		

=== at North Texas ===
Charlotte 49ers (0–5) at North Texas Mean Green (3–2) – Game summary

Quarter	1	2	Total
49ers			0
Mean Green			0

at DATCU Stadium • Denton, Texas

- Date: October 10
- Game time: TBD

Statistics	CLT	UNT
First downs		
Plays–yards		
Rushes–yards		
Passing yards		
Passing: comp–att–int		
Time of possession		

Team	Category	Player	Statistics
Charlotte	Passing		
Charlotte	Rushing		
Charlotte	Receiving		
North Texas	Passing		
North Texas	Rushing		
North Texas	Receiving		

=== at Temple ===
Charlotte 49ers (0–6) at Temple Owls (2–4) – Game summary

Quarter	1	2	3	4	Total
49ers	7	0	14	17	38
Owls	7	7	7	10	31

at Lincoln Financial Field • Philadelphia, Pennsylvania

- Date: October 17
- Game time: 1:00 p.m. EDT
- Game weather: Cloudy • Temperature: 60 °F (16 °C) • Wind: N 12 mph
- Game attendance: 11,589
- Referee: Matt Overton
- TV announcers (ESPN+): Joe Tordy and Barrett Brooks
- Box score, Recap

Game information
First quarter
- CLT – Khamani Alexander 1-yard run (Aiden Bui kick), 10:13. 49ers 7–0. Drive: 7 plays, 67 yards, 3:24.
- TEM – Keveun Mason 21-yard run (Carl Hardin kick), 4:18. Tied 7–7. Drive: 12 plays, 75 yards, 5:55.

Second quarter

- TEM – Ajani Sheppard 7-yard run (Carl Hardin kick), 1:38. Owls 14–7. Drive: 7 plays, 84 yards, 2:54.

Third quarter

- CLT – Derrick Eley 24-yard pass from Conner Harrell (Aiden Bui kick), 12:11. Tied 14–14. Drive: 6 plays, 73 yards, 2:43.
- CLT – Conner Harrell 8-yard run (Aiden Bui kick), 7:17. 49ers 21–14. Drive: 7 plays, 68 yards, 3:29.
- TEM – Ajani Sheppard 44-yard run (Carl Hardin kick), 6:26. Tied 21–21. Drive: 2 plays, 75 yards, 0:47.

Fourth quarter

- CLT – Gus McGee 9-yard pass from Conner Harrell (Aiden Bui kick), 14:12. 49ers 28–21. Drive: 6 plays, 78 yards, 2:58.
- TEM – Peter Clarke 4-yard pass from Ajani Sheppard (Carl Hardin kick), 11:04. Tied 28–28. Drive: 6 plays, 81 yards, 2:58.
- CLT – Conner Harrell 10-yard run (Aiden Bui kick), 8:40. 49ers 35–28. Drive: 5 plays, 65 yards, 2:18.
- CLT – Aiden Bui 47-yard field goal, 1:48. 49ers 38–28. Drive: 9 plays, 26 yards, 3:39.
- TEM – Carl Hardin 28-yard field goal, 0:48. 49ers 38–31. Drive: 7 plays, 65 yards, 1:00.

Statistics	CLT	TEM
First downs	26	20
Plays–yards	69–449	61–455
Rushes–yards	38–168	34–206
Passing yards	281	249
Passing: comp–att–int	23–31–0	17–27–0
Turnovers	1	0
Time of possession	32:49	27:11

Team	Category	Player	Statistics
Charlotte	Passing	Conner Harrell	23/31, 281 yards, 2 TD
Charlotte	Rushing	Henry Rutledge	17 carries, 123 yards
Charlotte	Receiving	Derrick Eley	6 receptions, 96 yards, TD
Temple	Passing	Ajani Sheppard	15/23, 236 yards, TD
Temple	Rushing	Ajani Sheppard	7 carries, 70 yards, 2 TD
Temple	Receiving	Peter Clarke	5 receptions, 127 yards, TD

=== Tulane ===
Tulane Green Wave (3–4) at Charlotte 49ers (1–6) – Game summary

Quarter	1	2	Total
Green Wave			0
49ers			0

at Jerry Richardson Stadium • Charlotte, North Carolina

- Date: October 30
- Game time: 7:00 p.m. EDT
- TV: ESPN2

Statistics	TULN	CLT
First downs		
Plays–yards		
Rushes–yards		
Passing yards		
Passing: comp–att–int		
Time of possession		

Team	Category	Player	Statistics
Tulane	Passing		
Tulane	Rushing		
Tulane	Receiving		
Charlotte	Passing		
Charlotte	Rushing		
Charlotte	Receiving		

=== at UAB ===
Charlotte 49ers (1–7) at UAB Blazers (4–4) – Game summary

Quarter	1	2	Total
49ers			0
Blazers			0

at Protective Stadium • Birmingham, Alabama

- Date: November 7
- Game time: TBD

Statistics	CLT	UAB
First downs		
Plays–yards		
Rushes–yards		
Passing yards		
Passing: comp–att–int		
Time of possession		

Team	Category	Player	Statistics
Charlotte	Passing		
Charlotte	Rushing		
Charlotte	Receiving		
UAB	Passing		
UAB	Rushing		
UAB	Receiving		

=== East Carolina ===
East Carolina Pirates (5–4) at Charlotte 49ers (1–8) – Game summary

Quarter	1	2	Total
Pirates			0
49ers			0

at Jerry Richardson Stadium • Charlotte, North Carolina

- Date: November 14
- Game time: TBD

Statistics	ECU	CLT
First downs		
Plays–yards		
Rushes–yards		
Passing yards		
Passing: comp–att–int		
Time of possession		

Team	Category	Player	Statistics
East Carolina	Passing		
East Carolina	Rushing		
East Carolina	Receiving		
Charlotte	Passing		
Charlotte	Rushing		
Charlotte	Receiving		

=== at Tulsa ===
Charlotte 49ers (1–9) at Tulsa Golden Hurricane (6–4) – Game summary

Quarter	1	2	Total
49ers			0
Golden Hurricane			0

at Skelly Field at H. A. Chapman Stadium • Tulsa, Oklahoma

- Date: November 21
- Game time: TBD

Statistics	CLT	TLSA
First downs		
Plays–yards		
Rushes–yards		
Passing yards		
Passing: comp–att–int		
Time of possession		

Team	Category	Player	Statistics
Charlotte	Passing		
Charlotte	Rushing		
Charlotte	Receiving		
Tulsa	Passing		
Tulsa	Rushing		
Tulsa	Receiving		

=== Navy ===
Navy Midshipmen (4–6) at Charlotte 49ers (1–10) – Game summary

Quarter	1	2	Total
Midshipmen			0
49ers			0

at Jerry Richardson Stadium • Charlotte, North Carolina

- Date: November 28
- Game time: TBD

Statistics	NAVY	CLT
First downs		
Plays–yards		
Rushes–yards		
Passing yards		
Passing: comp–att–int		
Time of possession		

Team	Category	Player	Statistics
Navy	Passing		
Navy	Rushing		
Navy	Receiving		
Charlotte	Passing		
Charlotte	Rushing		
Charlotte	Receiving		

== Personnel ==
=== Coaching staff ===
On January 26, 2026, the 49ers announced the hiring of defensive ends coach Victor Cabral and would promote defensive analyst Tariq Drake as the cornerbacks coach.

Name	Position	Seasons at Charlotte	Alma mater	Previous
Tim Albin	Head coach	2	NW OK St. (1988)	Head coach (Ohio)
Todd Fitch	Associate Head coach/Offensive coordinator/Quarterbacks	2	Ohio Wesleyan (1985)	Offensive analyst (LSU)
Brian Haines	Assistant head coach, Running backs, Special teams	2	Marietta College (2004)	Runningbacks/Special teams coordinator (App. St.)
Nate Faanes	Defensive coordinator/Linebackers	2	Winona St. (2015)	Co-defensive coordinator (Ohio)
Tre' Bell	Defensive backs/Defensive passing coordinator	2	UConn (2018)	Defensive analyst (WVU)
Victor Cabral	Defensive ends	1	Georgia Southern (2006)	Outside linebackers coach (WVU)
Tariq Drake	Cornerbacks	2	Ohio (2021)	Defensive analyst (Charlotte)
Brian Metz	Tight ends/Recruiting coordinator	2	Notre Dame (2013)	Tight ends/Recruiting coordinator (Ohio)
Vince Reynolds	Defensive tackles	2	Northern Illinois (2004)	Defensive line coach/Defensive run game coordinator (Arkansas St.)
Allen Rudolph	Offensive line/Run game coordinator	2	Southern Miss. (1995)	Offensive line (Ohio)
Paul Turner	Wide receivers/Passing game coordinator	2	LA Tech (2016)	Lead offensive analyst (LSU)

=== Roster ===
2026 Charlotte 49ers football team roster
Players
Coaches
Offense

Pos.	#	Name	Class
WR	0	Cam Pedro	RSr
WR	1	Jaden Barnes	Sr
WR	2	Jaylen Hampton	RSo
TE	3	Logan Mauldin	RSr
WR	4	Tank Boston	RSo
RB	5	Khamani Alexander	RSo
RB	6	D'Mariun Perteet	RJr
RB	7	Chance Williams	RSr
WR	8	Zyheem Collick	RSo
QB	9	Cole Gonzales	RSr
QB	10	Jaylen White	Fr
WR	11	KD Hunter-Gibson	Sr
QB	12	Grayson Loftis	RJr
WR	13	Caleb Tucker	Fr
WR	14	Adam Hopkins IV	RJr
QB	15	Conner Harrell	RSr
QB	16	Luke McNulty	RFr
TE	17	Gus McGee	GS
WR	18	Seth Franklin	RJr
TE	19	Brody Dawyot	Fr
WR	20	Donte Nicholson	Fr
RB	21	Henry Rutledge	GS
RB	24	Jariel Cobb	So
WR	38	Sean Manuel	RFr
OL	50	Rod Green	RSr
OL	54	Isaac Sikes-Rasby	RFr
OL	55	Mathias Nielsen	Sr
OL	56	Jake Allen	Fr
OL	57	Luke Sandy	RSr
OL	61	Reginhard Pierre-Nau	RJr
OL	65	Nic Cruji	RSr
OL	66	Omarion Davis	RSr
OL	67	Dom Silvia	RSo
OL	68	Cody Taylor	Fr
OL	71	Amar Harper	So
OL	74	J'ven Williams	RJr
OL	75	Kristos Fernandez	GS
OL	76	Isaiah Bullerdick	RSr
OL	77	Dylan Nolan-Cook	Jr
OL	79	Tristen Brown	RFr
WR	80	Jeremiah Hoffman	RFr
TE	81	Brady Rhoads	RSo
TE	83	Grant Laskey	RSo
TE	85	Jason Jeffares	RJr
TE	88	Lane Wadle	Jr
WR	89	Derrick Eley	RSo

Defense

Pos.	#	Name	Class
DB	0	Collin Gill	RJr
DB	1	Jameel Croft Jr.	RJr
DL	2	Jaylon Johnson	Sr
DB	3	Dy'Lon Womack	So
DB	4	Tradarius Smith	Jr
DB	6	Nireek Sharpe	Jr
DL	7	DJ Burgess	RSr
DL	8	Macyo Williams	GS
DL	9	Curtis Simpson	RSo
LB	10	Jerry Wall III	Jr
DB	11	DeQuinder Williams II	RSo
DB	12	CJ Clinkscales	RSr
LB	13	Gavin Willis	Sr
DL	14	Kendal Brown	RSo
DL	15	Ayo Tifase	RSr
DB	16	Shamar McIntosh	RSo
DB	17	Kameron Manley	RSo
DB	18	Chase Usher	Fr
LB	19	Kadin Schmitz	Sr
DB	20	Zayden Laing-Taylor	RSo
DB	21	Maddox West	Fr
DB	22	Kaden Catoe	Fr
DL	23	Darius Wallace	RSo
DB	24	Josh Hines	Fr
LB	25	Gray Patterson	Fr
DB	26	Devon St. Clair	RFr
DB	28	Cornell Allen	RSo
LB	30	Stellan Bowman	RSo
DB	31	Tyson Craig	RFr
LB	32	La'Trell Sellers	Fr
DL	33	Colin Bussey	Fr
LB	36	Parker Startz	RSo
DL	44	Max Jansenvanvuren	Fr
LB	45	Mikey Domanik	Fr
LB	46	Will Estes	RFr
DL	51	Jamarrion Solomon	RSr
DL	55	Shaku Sangarie	RJr
DL	77	Lewis Price-Law	RFr
DL	85	Caleb Irving	RSo
DL	88	D'Nas White	RSo
DL	90	Chris Morton	RFr
DL	94	Takeo Massey	RFr
DL	95	Devin Ancrum	RFr
DL	99	Jaylen Doss	RFr

Special teams

Pos.	#	Name	Class
LS	33	Henry Searcy	RFr
P	44	Ian Kelly	RFr
K	84	Aiden Bui	RFr
P	95	Bronson Long	RSr

Head coach

- Tim Albin (Northwestern Oklahoma State)

Coordinators/assistant coaches

- Todd Fitch (Ohio Wesleyan)
  Offensive coordinator/quarterbacks
- Brian Haines (Marietta)
  Special teams coordinator/running backs
- Nate Faanes (Winona State)
  Defensive coordinator/linebackers
- Tre' Bell (Connecticut)
  Defensive backs/defensive pass game coordinator
- Victor Cabral (Georgia Southern)
  Defensive ends
- Tariq Drake (Ohio)
  Cornerbacks
- Brian Metz (Notre Dame)
  Tight ends/recruiting coordinator
- Vince Reynolds (Northern Illinois)
  Defensive tackles
- Allen Rudolph (Southern Miss)
  Offensive line/run game coordinator
- Paul Turner (Louisiana Tech)
  Wide receivers/pass game coordinator

Legend

- (C) Team captain
- (S) Suspended
- (I) Ineligible
- Injured
- Redshirt

Roster

=== Recruiting class ===
The following recruits and transfers have signed letters of intent or verbally committed to the Charlotte 49ers football program for the 2026 recruiting year.

College recruiting
Name	Hometown	School	Height	Weight	40^{‡}	Commit date
Jake Allen; IOL	Jackson, OH	Jackson HS	6 ft 3 in (1.91 m)	280 lb (130 kg)	–	Apr 1, 2025
Jake Allen; IOL	Recruit ratings: 247Sports: ESPN: (73)					
Alchino Blakely; S	Snellville, GA	South Gwinnett HS	5 ft 10 in (1.78 m)	190 lb (86 kg)	–	Apr 8, 2025
Alchino Blakely; S	Recruit ratings: 247Sports: ESPN: (73)					
Kaiden Bower; DL	Carmel, IN	Carmel HS	6 ft 3 in (1.91 m)	240 lb (110 kg)	–	Jun 3, 2025
Kaiden Bower; DL	Recruit ratings: 247Sports: ESPN: (73)					
Colin Bussey; EDGE	Douglasville, GA	New Manchester HS	6 ft 3 in (1.91 m)	250 lb (110 kg)	–	Nov 27, 2025
Colin Bussey; EDGE	Recruit ratings: 247Sports: ESPN: (79)					
Kaden Catoe; CB	Greensboro, NC	Grimsley HS	6 ft 0 in (1.83 m)	165 lb (75 kg)	–	May 27, 2025
Kaden Catoe; CB	Recruit ratings: 247Sports:					
Brody Dawyot; TE	Salem, VA	Glenvar HS	6 ft 5 in (1.96 m)	220 lb (100 kg)	–	Jun 22, 2025
Brody Dawyot; TE	Recruit ratings: 247Sports: ESPN: (74)					
Mikey Domanik; LB	Marietta, GA	Carlton J. Kell HS	6 ft 2 in (1.88 m)	225 lb (102 kg)	–	Jun 3, 2025
Mikey Domanik; LB	Recruit ratings: 247Sports: ESPN: (73)					
Amar Harper; OT	Magee, MS	Itawamba CC	6 ft 6 in (1.98 m)	315 lb (143 kg)	–	Dec 3, 2025
Amar Harper; OT	Recruit ratings: 247Sports: ESPN: (73)					
Josh Hines; S	Charlotte, NC	Myers Park HS	6 ft 2 in (1.88 m)	195 lb (88 kg)	–	Apr 23, 2025
Josh Hines; S	Recruit ratings: 247Sports: ESPN: (74)					
Max Jansenvanvuren; EDGE	Waterford, MI	Mott HS	6 ft 5 in (1.96 m)	260 lb (120 kg)	–	Mar 31, 2025
Max Jansenvanvuren; EDGE	Recruit ratings: 247Sports: ESPN: (75)					
Zayden Laing-Taylor; CB	Fort Lauderdale, FL	Butler CC	5 ft 11 in (1.80 m)	190 lb (86 kg)	–	Dec 3, 2025
Zayden Laing-Taylor; CB	Recruit ratings: 247Sports: ESPN: (74)					
Mason McGill; IOL	Gainesville, GA	North Hall HS	6 ft 4 in (1.93 m)	270 lb (120 kg)	–	Jun 23, 2025
Mason McGill; IOL	Recruit ratings: 247Sports:					
Donte Nicholson; WR	Charlotte, NC	West Charlotte HS	6 ft 0 in (1.83 m)	175 lb (79 kg)	–	Jun 27, 2025
Donte Nicholson; WR	Recruit ratings: 247Sports:					
Dylan Nolan-Cook; OT	Scottsdale, AZ	Hutchinson CC	6 ft 5 in (1.96 m)	305 lb (138 kg)	–	Nov 3, 2025
Dylan Nolan-Cook; OT	Recruit ratings: 247Sports: ESPN: (74)					
Gray Patterson; LB	Fort Mill, SC	Fort Mill HS	6 ft 3 in (1.91 m)	215 lb (98 kg)	–	Sep 18, 2025
Gray Patterson; LB	Recruit ratings: 247Sports:					
JP Patterson; S	McKinney, TX	Navarro College	6 ft 0 in (1.83 m)	205 lb (93 kg)	–	Nov 25, 2025
JP Patterson; S	Recruit ratings: 247Sports: ESPN: (72)					
Reginhard Pierre-Nau; IOL	Jonesboro, GA	Northwest Mississippi CC	6 ft 2 in (1.88 m)	300 lb (140 kg)	–	Dec 3, 2025
Reginhard Pierre-Nau; IOL	Recruit ratings: 247Sports: ESPN: (72)					
La'Trell Sellers; LB	Hazlehurst, GA	Jeff Davis HS	6 ft 2 in (1.88 m)	210 lb (95 kg)	–	Dec 3, 2025
La'Trell Sellers; LB	Recruit ratings: 247Sports: ESPN: (77)					
Nireek Sharpe; CB	Stockbridge, GA	Holmes CC	6 ft 0 in (1.83 m)	175 lb (79 kg)	–	Oct 20, 2025
Nireek Sharpe; CB	Recruit ratings: 247Sports: ESPN: (74)					
Tradarius Smith; CB	Port Gibson, MS	Pearl River CC	6 ft 2 in (1.88 m)	190 lb (86 kg)	–	Nov 30, 2025
Tradarius Smith; CB	Recruit ratings: 247Sports: ESPN: (72)					
Cody Taylor; IOL	Greenwood, AR	Greenwood HS	6 ft 3 in (1.91 m)	310 lb (140 kg)	–	Jun 7, 2025
Cody Taylor; IOL	Recruit ratings: Rivals: 247Sports: ESPN: (77)					
Caleb Tucker; WR	Bryant, AR	Bryant HS	6 ft 0 in (1.83 m)	185 lb (84 kg)	–	Jun 22, 2025
Caleb Tucker; WR	Recruit ratings: 247Sports: ESPN: (72)					
Jarell Turner; CB	Columbia, SC	Richland Northeast HS	6 ft 0 in (1.83 m)	175 lb (79 kg)	–	
Jarell Turner; CB	Recruit ratings: 247Sports:					
Chase Usher; CB	Tyrone, GA	Sandy Creek HS	5 ft 10 in (1.78 m)	175 lb (79 kg)	–	Jun 1, 2025
Chase Usher; CB	Recruit ratings: 247Sports: ESPN: (72)					
Jerry Wall III; LB	Olive Branch, MS	Northwest Mississippi CC	6 ft 1 in (1.85 m)	210 lb (95 kg)	–	Nov 27, 2025
Jerry Wall III; LB	Recruit ratings: 247Sports: ESPN: (72)					
Maddox West; S	Smyrna, GA	Campbell HS	6 ft 0 in (1.83 m)	174 lb (79 kg)	–	Dec 3, 2025
Maddox West; S	Recruit ratings: 247Sports:					
Jaylen White; QB	Clearwater, FL	Clearwater HS	6 ft 0.5 in (1.84 m)	195 lb (88 kg)	–	Jun 6, 2025
Jaylen White; QB	Recruit ratings: Rivals: 247Sports: ESPN: (76)					
Overall recruit ranking: Rivals: 93 247Sports: 96 ESPN: NA
‡ Refers to 40-yard dash; Note: In many cases, Scout, Rivals, 247Sports, On3, and ESPN may conflict in their listings of height, weight and 40 time.; In these cases, the average was taken. ESPN grades are on a 100-point scale.; Sources: "Charlotte Football Commitments". Rivals.; "2026 Charlotte Football Commits". Scout.; "ESPN". ESPN.; "Scout.com Team Recruiting Rankings". Scout.; "2026 Team Ranking". Rivals.com.

=== Key transfers ===
Player	Position	Previous	Hometown	High school	Class	Height	Weight
Khamani Alexander	Running back	Appalachian State	Homestead, FL	Belen Jesuit Prep	RS-FR	6'-2"	195 lbs
Devin Ancrum	Defensive lineman	North Carolina	Buford, GA	Mill Creek	FR	6'-3"	280 lbs
Jaden Barnes	Wide receiver	Appalachian State	Fairburn, GA	Langston Hughes	JR	5'-8"	162 lbs
Tank Boston	Cornerback	NC State	Anderson, SC	Westside	SO	6'-0"	175 lbs
Zyheem Collick	Wide receiver	Bryant	Snow Hill, MD	Snow Hill	SO	5'-11"	170 lbs
Jameel Croft	Cornerback	Kansas	Detroit, MI	Martin Luther King Jr.	RS-SO	6'-1"	165 lbs
Nicolas Cruji	Inside offensive lineman	Maine	Mississauga, ON	Wyoming Seminary Prep	RS-JR	6'-4"	305 lbs
Cole Gonzales	Quarterback	Pittsburgh	Ocala, FL	Trinity Catholic	SR	6'-0"	195 lbs
Logan Mauldin	Tight end	McNeese	Charlotte, NC	Myers Park	RS-SR	6'-3"	220 lbs
Shamar McIntosh	Safety	Maryland	Washington, D.C.	St. John's College	SO	6'-2"	185 lbs
Mathias Nielsen	Offensive tackle	Virginia Union	Bagsværd, Denmark	Gentofte HF	JR	6'-2"	295 lbs
Cam Pedro	Wide receiver	Southeast Missouri State	Suwanee, GA	Collins Hill	RS-JR	5'-11"	165 lbs
D'Mariun Perteet	Running back	Coastal Carolina	Batesville, MS	South Panola	JR	5'-10"	200 lbs
Lewis Price	Defensive lineman	Wingate	Fort Mill, SC	Catawba Ridge	FR	6'-4"	295 lbs
Luke Sandy	Inside offensive lineman	Wyoming	Parker, CO	Legend	RS-JR	6'-2"	285 lbs
Shaku Sangarie	Defensive lineman	Drake	Jacksonville, FL	Atlantic Coast	RS-SO	6'-2"	250 lbs
Henry Searcy	Long snapper	Pittsburgh	Tallahassee, FL	Lawton Chiles	FR	6'-3"	180 lbs
Lane Wadle	Tight end	Georgia State	Greenfield, IN	Greenfield-Central	SO	6'-5"	245 lbs
D'Nas White	Defensive lineman	Catawba	Concord, NC	Jay M. Robinson	RS-FR	6'-5"	310 lbs
Chance Williams	Running back	Cincinnati	Baton Rouge, LA	Scotlandville Magnet	SR	5'-10"	172 lbs
J'ven Williams	Inside offensive lineman	Penn State	Reading, PA	Wyomissing Area	RS-SO	6'-5"	319 lbs

=== Departing players ===
==== Outgoing transfers ====
Player	Position	New school
Connor Adair	TE	Campbell
Evan Austin	WR	Campbell
Andrew Bennett	P	James Madison
Dwight Bootle II	CB	Arizona
Mason Bowers	OT	Unknown
Liam Boyd	K	Michigan State
Ta'ir Brooks	WR	Unknown
Miles Burris	WR	Akron
Aydan Cannon	DB	Davidson
Don Chaney Jr.	RB	Louisiana–Monroe
Maurice Clipper Jr.	IOL	Georgia Southern
Antonio Cotman Jr.	DB	Virginia Union
Drew Cunningham	IOL	North Texas
Jake Davids	RB	Unknown
Devin Davis	IOL	South Florida
Rod Gainey Jr.	RB	LSU
Tyler Gibson	OT	UCF
Cary Grant	S	Appalachian State
Duke Guenther	RB	Unknown
Justin Hayes	LB	Unknown
Cheick Kaba	DL	Unknown
Aiden Martinez	IOL	Unknown
Jayden McGowan	WR	Baylor
Xavier Miles	DL	Memphis
Javen Nicholas	WR	Duke
JJ Okate	LB	Unknown
Umar Rockhead	OT	Norfolk State
Eli Samples	IOL	Withdrawn
Curtis Simpson	EDGE	Withdrawn
CJ Stokes	RB	Unknown
Yamil Talib	EDGE	Colorado
Zach Wilcke	QB	Northwestern State
Gavin Willis	LB	Withdrawn
Jake Young	TE	Western Carolina
