= Marcus Stokes (American football) =

American football player

No. 2 – Memphis Tigers
- Position: Quarterback
- Class: Redshirt Junior

Personal information
- Born: Fairfax, Virginia, U.S.
- Listed height: 6 ft 2 in (1.88 m)
- Listed weight: 209 lb (95 kg)

Career information
- High school: Nease (Ponte Vedra, Florida)
- College: West Florida (2023–2025); Memphis (2026–present)

Awards and highlights
- Gulf South Conference Offensive Player of the Week (2024); Harlon Hill Trophy Finalist (2025)

Marcus Stokes is an American football quarterback for the Memphis Tigers. He previously played for the West Florida Argonauts.

== Early life ==
Marcus Stokes was born in Fairfax, Virginia. He grew up playing basketball and football, recording a 4.82-second 40-yard dash and 30.5-inch vertical jump. Stokes attended Nease High School, the alma mater of Tim Tebow and played as a dual-threat quarterback.

At Nease High School, under Head Coach and Charleston Southern University HOF QB Collin Drafts, Stokes emerged as a top quarterback prospect. In his junior year (2021), he threw for 2,672 yards and 22 touchdowns with nine interceptions, while rushing for 496 yards and six touchdowns, leading Nease to a 9-4 record and the regional finals in Florida's second-highest classification. In his senior year (2022), he completed 136 of 248 passes (54.8%) for 1,867 yards, 13 touchdowns, and 11 interceptions, and rushed for 582 yards and 13 touchdowns, though Nease finished 2-8. Over two seasons, Stokes amassed 4,498 yards and 58 total touchdowns.

Rated a four-star recruit by 247Sports and the No. 11 quarterback by ESPN, Stokes was an Elite 11 finalist. He initially committed to Penn State in April 2022, flipped to Florida in July, but had his scholarship withdrawn in November 2022.

== College career ==
=== West Florida (2023–2025) ===
Stokes signed with the University of West Florida Argonauts, a Division II program, on February 1, 2023. In his redshirt freshman season (2024), he started eight games, completing 112 of 209 passes for 1,540 yards and 14 touchdowns. His performance in a Gulf South Conference game against Delta State earned him GSC Offensive Player of the Week honors in October 2024.

Following a 2025 season at West Florida featuring 3,297 passing yards, 30 passing touchdowns, and 13 interceptions, he complemented by 367 yards and 10 scores on the ground. Stokes earned Gulf South Conference Offensive Player of the Year honors and was a finalist for the Harlon Hill Trophy, Stokes entered the NCAA transfer portal on December 2, 2025.

=== Memphis Tigers (2026–present) ===
On January 7, 2026, Stokes announced his commitment to the Memphis Tigers, an NCAA Division I FBS program in the American Athletic Conference, under head coach Charles Huff. Stokes has two years of eligibility remaining.

== Career statistics ==
=== College ===
Year	Team	Games			Passing								Rushing			
Year	Team	GP	GS	Record	Cmp	Att	Pct	Yds	Y/A	TD	Int	Rtg	Att	Yds	Avg	TD
2023	West Florida	3	0	—	3	4	75.0	53	13.2	0	0	186.3	6	57	9.5	0
2024	West Florida	8	8	5–3	112	209	53.6	1,540	7.4	14	8	129.9	65	163	2.5	3
2025	West Florida	12	12	10–2	223	368	60.6	3,297	8.9	30	13	155.7	82	367	4.5	10
2026	Memphis	4	4	3–1	70	98	71.4	1,053	10.7	9	3	185.9	27	91	3.4	0
D-II career		23	20	15–5	338	581	58.2	4,890	8.4	44	21	146.6	153	587	3.8	13
FBS career		4	4	3–1	70	98	71.4	1,053	10.7	9	3	185.9	27	91	3.4	0

== Controversy ==
In November 2022, the University of Florida withdrew Stokes's scholarship offer after a video surfaced on social media showing him using a racial slur while singing a rap song. Stokes issued a public apology, stating, "I deeply apologize for the words in the song that I chose to say. It was hurtful and offensive to many people, and I regret that." After the incident, Stokes received offers from Albany State University and the University of West Florida, with Albany State later rescinding its offer due to community backlash. West Florida's coaching staff reviewed the incident before signing him.
