= 2026 North Texas Mean Green football team =

American college football season

2026 North Texas Mean Green football
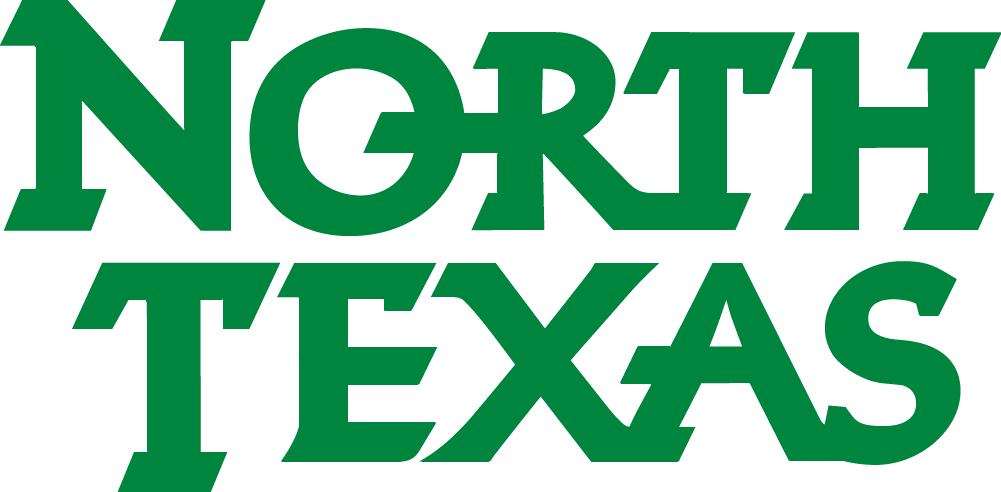
- Conference: American Conference
- Record: 7–4 (5–2 American)
- Head coach: Neal Brown (1st season)
- Offensive scheme: Spread
- Defensive coordinator: Matt Powledge (1st season)
- Co-defensive coordinator: Bradley Dale Peveto (1st season)
- Base defense: Multiple 3–4
- Home stadium: DATCU Stadium

2026 American Conference football standings
	Conf.			Overall
Team	W		L	W		L
UTSA	6	–	1	9	–	2
Memphis	5	–	2	8	–	3
East Carolina	5	–	2	7	–	4
North Texas	5	–	2	7	–	4
UAB	4	–	3	6	–	5
Army	4	–	3	5	–	5
Tulsa	4	–	3	7	–	4
Florida Atlantic	4	–	3	7	–	4
Tulane	4	–	3	6	–	5
Navy	3	–	4	4	–	6
South Florida	2	–	5	6	–	5
Rice	1	–	6	2	–	9
Charlotte	1	–	6	1	–	10
Temple	1	–	6	2	–	9
Championship: December 5, 2026
As of November 22, 2026; Rankings from AP poll

The 2026 North Texas Mean Green football team represents the University of North Texas as a member of the American Conference during the 2026 NCAA Division I FBS football season. Led by first-year head coach Neal Brown, the Mean Green play their home games at DATCU Stadium in Denton, Texas.

== Schedule ==
Date	Time	Opponent	Site	TV	Result	Attendance
September 5	11:00 a.m.	at No. 6 Indiana*	Memorial Stadium; Bloomington, IN (Big Noon Kickoff)	FOX	L 16–52	54,493
September 12	2:45 p.m.	UNLV*	DATCU Stadium; Denton, TX	ESPNU	W 44–6	20,331
September 19	11:00 a.m.	at Texas State*	UFCU Stadium; San Marcos, TX	USA	L 35–49	14,166
September 26	6:30 p.m.	Houston Christian*	DATCU Stadium; Denton, TX	ESPN+	W 63–14	21,718
October 1	8:00 p.m.	at Tulsa	Skelly Field at H. A. Chapman Stadium; Tulsa, OK	ESPN	W 45–44 ^{OT}	14,938
October 10	2:30 p.m.	Charlotte	DATCU Stadium; Denton, TX	ESPN+	W 50–10	17,411
October 24	2:30 p.m.	at Navy	Navy–Marine Corps Memorial Stadium; Annapolis, MD	CBSSN	W 49–39	33,166
October 29	6:30 p.m.	Florida Atlantic	DATCU Stadium; Denton, TX	ESPN	W 48–41	22,092
November 7	3:00 p.m.	Rice	DATCU Stadium; Denton, TX	ESPNU	W 52–23	23,443
November 14	8:00 p.m.	at UTSA	Alamodome; San Antonio, TX	ESPNU	L 16–35	25,151
November 21	11:00 a.m.	at Tulane	Yulman Stadium; New Orleans, LA	ESPNU	L 24–28	16,203
November 28	3:00 p.m.	UAB	DATCU Stadium; Denton, TX	ESPNU		
*Non-conference game; Rankings from AP Poll (and CFP Rankings, after November 3) – Released prior to game; All times are in Mountain time

== Game summaries ==
=== at No. 6 Indiana ===
North Texas Mean Green (0–0) at No. 6 Indiana Hoosiers (0–0) – Game summary

Quarter	1	2	3	4	Total
Mean Green	0	6	10	0	16
No. 6 Hoosiers	14	10	7	21	52

at Memorial Stadium • Bloomington, Indiana

- Date: September 5
- Game time: 11:00 a.m. CDT
- Game weather: Sunny • Temperature: 91 °F (33 °C) • Wind: SE at 7 miles per hour (11 km/h)
- Game attendance: 54,493
- Referee: Chris Coyte
- TV announcers (FOX): Gus Johnson (play-by-play), Joel Klatt (analyst), and Jenny Taft (sideline)

Game information

First quarter

- IU – Nick Marsh 15-yard pass from Josh Hoover (Nico Radicic kick), 13:36. Hoosiers 7–0. Drive: 3 plays, 20 yards, 1:13.
- IU – Turbo Richard 2-yard run (Nico Radicic kick), 0:13. Hoosiers 14–0. Drive: 10 plays, 61 yards, 5:39.

Second quarter

- UNT – Dominic De Freitas 47-yard field goal, 9:48. Hoosiers 14–3. Drive: 9 plays, 41 yards, 5:25.
- IU – Charlie Becker 9-yard pass from Josh Hoover (Nico Radicic kick), 6:46. Hoosiers 21–3. Drive: 5 plays, 51 yards, 2:53.
- UNT – Dominic De Freitas 33-yard field goal, 1:57. Hoosiers 21–6. Drive: 9 plays, 60 yards, 4:49.
- IU – Nico Radicic 49-yard field goal, 1:24. Hoosiers 24–6. Drive: 5 plays, 26 yards, 0:30.

Third quarter

- UNT – Jahiem White 9-yard run (Dominic De Freitas kick), 11:40. Hoosiers 24–13. Drive: 6 plays, 75 yards, 3:20.
- IU – Charlie Becker 35-yard pass from Josh Hoover (Nico Radicic kick), 9:56. Hoosiers 31–13. Drive: 4 plays, 35 yards, 1:42.
- UNT – Dominic De Freitas 38-yard field goal, 1:18. Hoosiers 31–16. Drive: 8 plays, 38 yards, 4:02.

Fourth quarter

- IU – Davion Chandler 42-yard pass from Josh Hoover (Nico Radicic kick), 12:51. Hoosiers 38–16. Drive: 7 plays, 77 yards, 3:19.
- IU – Turbo Richard 1-yard run (Nico Radicic kick), 5:26. Hoosiers 45–16. Drive: 9 plays, 30 yards, 5:36.
- IU – Grant Wilson 43-yard run (Nico Radicic kick), 1:47. Hoosiers 52–16. Drive: 1 play, 43 yards, 0:08.

Statistics	UNT	IU
First downs	19	18
Plays–yards	67–367	46–365
Rushes–yards	38–152	30–134
Passing yards	215	231
Passing: Comp–Att–Int	23–29-1	13–16-0
Turnovers	1	0
Time of possession	37:22	22:38

Team	Category	Player	Statistics
North Texas	Passing	Tayven Jackson	22/28, 192 yards, INT
North Texas	Rushing	Jahiem White	14 carries, 61 yards, TD
North Texas	Receiving	Corri Milliner	4 receptions, 66 yards
Indiana	Passing	Josh Hoover	13/16, 231 yards, 4 TD
Indiana	Rushing	Turbo Richard	15 carries, 58 yards, 2 TD
Indiana	Receiving	Charlie Becker	4 receptions, 64 yards, 2 TD

=== UNLV ===
UNLV Rebels (1–1) at North Texas Mean Green (0–1) – Game summary

Quarter	1	2	3	4	Total
Rebels	0	3	3	0	6
Mean Green	13	7	14	10	44

at DATCU Stadium • Denton, Texas

- Date: September 12
- Game time: 2:45 p.m. CDT
- Game weather: Sunny • Temperature: 100 °F (38 °C) • Wind: N at 9 miles per hour (14 km/h)
- Game attendance: 20,331
- Referee: Christian Watson
- TV announcers (ESPNU): Chuckie Kempf and Dustin Fox

Game information

First quarter

- UNT – Dominic De Freitas 35-yard field goal, 10:48. Mean Green 3–0. Drive: 6 plays, 28 yards, 2:37.
- UNT – Dominic De Freitas 27-yard field goal, 6:27. Mean Green 6–0. Drive: 7 plays, 14 yards, 2:27.
- UNT – Jahiem White 32-yard pass from Tayven Jackson (Dominic De Freitas kick), 3:51. Mean Green 13–0. Drive: 3 plays, 49 yards, 1:19.

Second quarter

- UNLV – Ramon Villela 39-yard field goal, 5:38. Mean Green 13–3. Drive: 7 plays, 19 yards, 3:32.
- UNT – Tayven Jackson 3-yard run (Dominic De Freitas kick), 1:56. Mean Green 20–3. Drive: 8 plays, 75 yards, 3:42.

Third quarter

- UNT – Jahiem White 5-yard run (Dominic De Freitas kick), 12:32. Mean Green 27–3. Drive: 6 plays, 75 yards, 2:28.
- UNLV – Ramon Villela 37-yard field goal, 10:45. Mean Green 27–6. Drive: 6 plays, 55 yards, 1:38.
- UNT – Max Reese 16-yard pass from Tayven Jackson (Dominic De Freitas kick), 5:39. Mean Green 34–6. Drive: 11 plays, 75 yards, 5:06.

Fourth quarter

- UNT – Brendon Haygood 9-yard run (Dominic De Freitas kick), 8:24. Mean Green 41–6. Drive: 7 plays, 46 yards, 2:28.
- UNT – Dominic De Freitas 41-yard field goal, 1:12. Mean Green 44–6. Drive: 7 plays, 32 yards, 4:08.

Statistics	UNLV	UNT
First downs	18	22
Plays–yards	72–301	67–444
Rushes–yards	39–98	38–183
Passing yards	203	261
Passing: comp–att–int	19–33–1	17–29–0
Turnovers	4	0
Time of possession	27:45	32:15

Team	Category	Player	Statistics
UNLV	Passing	Jackson Arnold	18/27, 194 yards
UNLV	Rushing	Jai'Den Thomas	10 carries, 37 yards
UNLV	Receiving	Taz Reddicks	5 receptions, 75 yards
North Texas	Passing	Tayven Jackson	15/26, 233 yards, 2 TD
North Texas	Rushing	Jahiem White	12 carries, 124 yards, TD
North Texas	Receiving	Corri Milliner	3 receptions, 65 yards

=== at Texas State ===
North Texas Mean Green (1–1) at Texas State Bobcats (0–2) – Game summary

Quarter	1	2	3	4	Total
Mean Green	7	21	0	7	35
Bobcats	21	7	7	14	49

at UFCU Stadium • San Marcos, Texas

- Date: September 19
- Game time: 11:00 a.m. CDT
- Game weather: Sunny
- Game attendance: 14,166
- Referee: Chris Wiggins
- TV announcers (USA Network): Nate Gatter, Ryan Leaf and Lauren Green

Game information

First quarter

- (10:53) TXST - Chris Dawn Jr. 12-yard pass from Brad Jackson (Jacob Bonilla kick), (Drive: 10 plays, 75 yards, 4:07; Texas State 7-0)
- (8:43) TXST - Chris Dawn Jr. 39-yard pass from Brad Jackson (Jacob Bonilla kick), (Drive: 3 plays, 62 yards, 0:36; Texas State 14-0)
- (3:18) UNT - Jahiem White 1-yard run (Dominic De Freitas kick), (Drive: 9 plays, 75 yards, 5:25; Texas State 14-7)
- (0:42) TXST - Davian Jackson 1-yard run (Jacob Bonilla kick), (Drive: 6 plays, 85 yards, 2:30; Texas State 21-7)

Second quarter

- (12:13) UNT - Kyle Koch 13-yard pass from Tayven Jackson (Dominic De Freitas kick), (Drive: 8 plays, 65 yards, 3:21; Texas State 21-14)
- (5:25) UNT - Brendon Haygood 2-yard run (Dominic De Freitas kick), (Drive: 10 plays, 93 yards, 3:34; Tied 21-21)
- (3:20) TXST - Blake Smith 41-yard pass from Brad Jackson (Jacob Bonilla kick), (Drive: 5 plays, 62 yards, 1:56; Texas State 28-21)
- (0:47) UNT - Corri Milliner 5-yard pass from Tayven Jackson (Dominic De Freitas kick), (Drive: 9 plays, 75 yards, 2:33; Tied 28-28)

Third quarter

- (4:10) TXST - Davian Jackson 1-yard run (Jacob Bonilla kick), (Drive: 8 plays, 67 yards, 3:20; Texas State 35-28)

Fourth quarter

- (8:14) TXST - Davian Jackson 13-yard pass from Brad Jackson (Jacob Bonilla kick), (Drive: 12 plays, 89 yards, 5:47; Texas State 42-28)
- (5:24) UNT - Jahiem White 18-yard pass from Tayven Jackson (Dominic De Freitas kick), (Drive: 7 plays, 75 yards, 2:50; Texas State 42-35)
- (3:07) TXST - Davian Jackson 57-yard run (Jacob Bonilla kick), (Drive: 5 plays, 80 yards, 2:14; Texas State 49-35)

Statistics	UNT	TXST
First downs	33	30
Plays–yards	85–605	71–605
Rushes–yards	29–113	49–337
Passing yards	492	268
Passing: comp–att–int	42–56–1	16–22–0
Turnovers	2	0
Time of possession	32:35	27:25

Team	Category	Player	Statistics
North Texas	Passing	Tayven Jackson	43/57, 483 yards, 3 TD, INT
North Texas	Rushing	Brendon Haygood	11 carries, 50 yards, TD
North Texas	Receiving	Justin Stevenson	10 receptions, 122 yards
Texas State	Passing	Brad Jackson	16/22, 268 yards, 4 TD
Texas State	Rushing	Torrance Burgess Jr.	25 carries, 214 yards
Texas State	Receiving	Chris Dawn Jr.	4 receptions, 107 yards, 2 TD

=== Houston Christian (FCS) ===
Houston Christian Huskies (FCS) (2–2) at North Texas Mean Green (1–2) – Game summary

Quarter	1	2	3	4	Total
Huskies (FCS)	0	0	0	0	0
Mean Green	0	0	0	0	0

at DATCU Stadium • Denton, Texas

- Date: September 26
- Game time: 6:30 p.m. CDT
- TV announcers (ESPN+): Will Conerly and LaDarrin McLane

Statistics	HCU	UNT
First downs		
Plays–yards		
Rushes–yards		
Passing yards		
Passing: comp–att–int		
Time of possession		

Team	Category	Player	Statistics
Houston Christian	Passing		
Houston Christian	Rushing		
Houston Christian	Receiving		
North Texas	Passing		
North Texas	Rushing		
North Texas	Receiving		

=== at Tulsa ===
North Texas Mean Green (2–2) at Tulsa Golden Hurricane (3–1) – Game summary

Quarter	1	2	3	4	Total
Mean Green	0	0	0	0	0
Golden Hurricane	0	0	0	0	0

at Skelly Field at H. A. Chapman Stadium • Tulsa, Oklahoma

- Date: October 1
- Game time: 8:00 p.m. CDT
- TV: ESPN

Statistics	UNT	TLSA
First downs		
Plays–yards		
Rushes–yards		
Passing yards		
Passing: comp–att–int		
Time of possession		

Team	Category	Player	Statistics
North Texas	Passing		
North Texas	Rushing		
North Texas	Receiving		
Tulsa	Passing		
Tulsa	Rushing		
Tulsa	Receiving		

=== Charlotte ===
Charlotte 49ers (0–5) at North Texas Mean Green (3–2) – Game summary

Quarter	1	2	3	4	Total
49ers	0	0	0	0	0
Mean Green	0	0	0	0	0

at DATCU Stadium • Denton, Texas

- Date: October 10
- Game time: TBD

Statistics	CLT	UNT
First downs		
Plays–yards		
Rushes–yards		
Passing yards		
Passing: comp–att–int		
Time of possession		

Team	Category	Player	Statistics
Charlotte	Passing		
Charlotte	Rushing		
Charlotte	Receiving		
North Texas	Passing		
North Texas	Rushing		
North Texas	Receiving		

=== at Navy ===
North Texas Mean Green (4–2) at Navy Midshipmen (2–4) – Game summary

Quarter	1	2	3	4	Total
Mean Green	0	0	0	0	0
Midshipmen	0	0	0	0	0

at Navy–Marine Corps Memorial Stadium • Annapolis, Maryland

- Date: October 24
- Game time: 2:30 p.m. CDT
- TV: CBSSN

Statistics	UNT	NAVY
First downs		
Plays–yards		
Rushes–yards		
Passing yards		
Passing: comp–att–int		
Time of possession		

Team	Category	Player	Statistics
North Texas	Passing		
North Texas	Rushing		
North Texas	Receiving		
Navy	Passing		
Navy	Rushing		
Navy	Receiving		

=== Florida Atlantic ===
Florida Atlantic Owls (5–2) at North Texas Mean Green (5–2) – Game summary

Quarter	1	2	3	4	Total
Owls	0	0	0	0	0
Mean Green	0	0	0	0	0

at DATCU Stadium • Denton, Texas

- Date: October 29
- Game time: 6:30 p.m. CDT
- TV: ESPN/ESPN2

Statistics	FAU	UNT
First downs		
Plays–yards		
Rushes–yards		
Passing yards		
Passing: comp–att–int		
Time of possession		

Team	Category	Player	Statistics
Florida Atlantic	Passing		
Florida Atlantic	Rushing		
Florida Atlantic	Receiving		
North Texas	Passing		
North Texas	Rushing		
North Texas	Receiving		

=== Rice ===
Rice Owls (1–7) at North Texas Mean Green (6–2) – Game summary

Quarter	1	2	3	4	Total
Owls	0	0	0	0	0
Mean Green	0	0	0	0	0

at DATCU Stadium • Denton, Texas

- Date: November 7
- Game time: TBD

Statistics	RICE	UNT
First downs		
Plays–yards		
Rushes–yards		
Passing yards		
Passing: comp–att–int		
Time of possession		

Team	Category	Player	Statistics
Rice	Passing		
Rice	Rushing		
Rice	Receiving		
North Texas	Passing		
North Texas	Rushing		
North Texas	Receiving		

=== at UTSA ===
North Texas Mean Green (7–2) at UTSA Roadrunners (7–2) – Game summary

Quarter	1	2	3	4	Total
Mean Green	0	0	0	0	0
Roadrunners	0	0	0	0	0

at Alamodome • San Antonio, Texas

- Date: November 14
- Game time: TBD

Statistics	UNT	UTSA
First downs		
Plays–yards		
Rushes–yards		
Passing yards		
Passing: comp–att–int		
Time of possession		

Team	Category	Player	Statistics
North Texas	Passing		
North Texas	Rushing		
North Texas	Receiving		
UTSA	Passing		
UTSA	Rushing		
UTSA	Receiving		

=== at Tulane ===
North Texas Mean Green (7–3) at Tulane Green Wave (5–5) – Game summary

Quarter	1	2	3	4	Total
Mean Green	0	0	0	0	0
Green Wave	0	0	0	0	0

at Yulman Stadium • New Orleans, Louisiana

- Date: November 21
- Game time: TBD

Statistics	UNT	TULN
First downs		
Plays–yards		
Rushes–yards		
Passing yards		
Passing: comp–att–int		
Time of possession		

Team	Category	Player	Statistics
North Texas	Passing		
North Texas	Rushing		
North Texas	Receiving		
Tulane	Passing		
Tulane	Rushing		
Tulane	Receiving		

=== UAB ===
UAB Blazers (6–5) at North Texas Mean Green (7–4) – Game summary

Quarter	1	2	3	4	Total
Blazers	0	0	0	0	0
Mean Green	0	0	0	0	0

at DATCU Stadium • Denton, Texas

- Date: November 28
- Game time: TBD

Statistics	UAB	UNT
First downs		
Plays–yards		
Rushes–yards		
Passing yards		
Passing: comp–att–int		
Time of possession		

Team	Category	Player	Statistics
UAB	Passing		
UAB	Rushing		
UAB	Receiving		
North Texas	Passing		
North Texas	Rushing		
North Texas	Receiving		

== Roster ==
2026 North Texas Mean Green football team roster
Players
Coaches
Offense

Pos.	#	Name	Class
WR	0	Corri Milliner	Sr
RB	1	Jahiem White	Sr
QB	2	Tayven Jackson	GS
WR	3	TJ Chukwurah	GS
RB	4	Nick Osho	GS
WR	6	Josiah Martin	Jr
TE	7	Max Reese	GS
WR	8	Shandon King	Sr
QB	9	Chaston Ditta	So
QB	10	Ziondre Williams	Fr
WR	11	Dalton Carnes	GS
QB	12	Chris Jimerson Jr.	So
WR	13	Justin Stevenson	Sr
WR	14	Kyle Koch	Jr
WR	16	James Tyre	Sr
TE	17	Brec Long	Sr
WR	18	Lathon Latiolais	Fr
WR	19	Grayson O'Bara	GS
RB	20	Adarion Nettles	Fr
RB	22	Colin Page	GS
RB	29	Brendon Haygood	So
RB	36	Keenan Jackson Jr.	So
OL	50	Jahzari Priester	Sr
OL	53	Dylan Shaw	Sr
OL	54	Henry Fenuku	So
OL	56	Austin Odette	Fr
OL	57	Chandler Strong	GS
OL	61	Drew Cunningham	Jr
OL	62	Amarion Berry	Jr
OL	64	Roberto Rodriguez	So
OL	66	Willie Goodacre	Jr
OL	68	Keon Johnson	Sr
OL	70	Brody Hamilton	So
OL	71	Johnny Williams IV	Sr
OL	72	Neto Umeozulu	GS
OL	73	Julio Madero IV	Jr
OL	74	Francisco Adams	Fr
OL	77	Caden Voltaire	Fr
OL	78	KC Ekwu	Fr
WR	80	Baron Tipton	Jr
TE	82	Connor Vaughn	GS
WR	84	Jackson Muckelroy	Sr
TE	85	Drew Clemens	So
RB	86	Zachary Yang	So
WR	87	Eli Nikolas	Fr
TE	88	Victor Aderungboye	Jr
TE	89	Jerious Singletary	Fr

Defense

Pos.	#	Name	Class
S	0	Brandon Jones	So
CB	1	Keshawn Davila	Sr
S	2	Taye Seymore	Sr
LB	3	Zakye Barker	GS
S	4	CJ Coombes	Sr
CB	5	Chase Canada	Sr
DL	6	Udoka Ezeani	GS
LB	7	Aaron Alexander	GS
CB	8	Caden Jenkins	Sr
S	9	Cameren Jenkins	Sr
DL	10	David Onuoha	GS
DL	11	Steven Curtis	Sr
S	12	Tyson Wilson	Sr
S	13	Graham Gillespie	GS
S	14	Bryce Garza	So
DL	15	Justin Benton	Sr
S	16	BJ Allen Jr.	GS
LB	17	Cedric Roberts	Jr
DL	18	Mo Diawara	GS
CB	19	Jaden Allen	Jr
CB	20	Taylor Starling	Sr
S	21	Jason Cross Jr.	Jr
S	22	Julian Knox Sr.	Jr
DL	23	Christian Lorenzo	GS
CB	24	Peyton Taylor	Sr
CB	25	Ja'Bree Bickham	So
CB	27	Zach Johnson	Sr
LB	30	Chantz Johnson	Sr
S	31	Aaden Little	Fr
CB	32	Anthony Benford II	Sr
LB	34	Brenden Reese	So
CB	35	Kaeden Swann	Fr
LB	36	Jaden Manning	So
S	38	Alonzo Welch	Fr
LB	40	Kailer Pettijohn	Fr
DL	41	Cason Applewhite	Fr
DL	42	Brayden Knox	So
DL	44	Dylan Williams	Fr
LB	45	Kenton Allen	GS
DL	51	Keelene Bradley	GS
DL	52	Courage Osawe Jr.	Jr
DL	53	Rohan Sturgeon	Fr
DL	58	Nolan Clark	GS
DL	88	Wesley Hudson	Sr
DL	91	Davion Rhodes	GS
DL	92	Grady Holmes	Fr
DL	93	Terrell Washington	Jr
DL	94	Caleb Lathan	Jr
DL	96	AJ Brown	So
DL	97	Demetrie Morgan	GS
DL	98	Curlee Thomas IV	GS
DL	99	Avion Carter	Sr

Special teams

Pos.	#	Name	Class
P	37	Ian Ratliff	Sr
P	46	Luke Crudgington	Fr
K	48	Michael Taylor II	Fr
LS	51	Brodie Scoggins	So
LS	52	Jacob Poff	So
K	90	Dominic De Freitas	So

Head coach

- Neal Brown

Coordinators/assistant coaches

- Jeff Crosby – Special Teams Coordinator
- Matt Powledge – Defensive Coordinator
- Bradley Dale Peveto – Co-Defensive Coordinator, Linebackers
- Ray Gates – Special Assistant to the Head Coach/Edges
- Mike Bloesch – Run Game Coordinator, Tight Ends
- Tyler Allen – Assistant Coach, Quarterbacks
- Ben Black – Assistant Coach, Defensive Line
- Dozier Dean – Assistant Coach, Inside Wide Receivers
- Corey Jordan – Assistant Coach, Cornerbacks
- Matt Mattox – Assistant Coach, Offensive Line
- Kishawn McClain – Assistant Coach, Wide Receivers
- Kirkland Parker – Assistant Coach, Safeties
- Chad Scott – Assistant Coach, Running Backs
- Sean Reagan – Special Assistant to the Head Coach - Offense
- Deuce Hogan – Assistant Quarterbacks Coach
- Jeremy Jones – Assistant Offensive Line Coach
- Christian Rizzi – Assistant Special Teams Coach
- Josh Petersen – Special Assistant to the Defensive Coordinator
- Errin Joe – General Manager, Football
- Patrick Johnston – Assistant AD, Chief of Staff
- Tommy Mainord – Senior Associate AD, NIL / Director of Football Strategy
- Jordan Diaz – Head Strength and Conditioning Coach
- Wesley Harwell – Director, Player Personnel
- Marielle McLoughlin – Director, Football Operations
- Cody Rieger – Director, Football Video
- Katelyn Smith – Director, On-Campus Recruiting
- Jarae Thurmond – Assistant General Manager/Director of Scouting
- Garrett Williams – Associate Strength & Conditioning Coach
- Cameron Howe – Assistant Director, Football Video / Offensive Assistant
- Daniel Reakes – Assistant Director, Player Personnel
- Mo Al-Sayyed – Assistant Director, Football Video/Offensive Analyst
- Kaya Mathews – Assistant Director, On-Campus Recruiting
- Seth Solano – Asst. Strength & Conditioning Coach

Legend

- (C) Team captain
- (S) Suspended
- (I) Ineligible
- Injured
- Redshirt

Roster
