= 2026 Navy Midshipmen football team =

American college football season

2026 Navy Midshipmen football
- Conference: American Conference
- Record: 4–6 (3–4 American)
- Head coach: Brian Newberry (4th season)
- Offensive coordinator: Drew Cronic (3rd season)
- Offensive scheme: Wing-T
- Defensive coordinator: Eric Lewis (1st season)
- Co-defensive coordinator: Ricky Brown (1st season)
- Base defense: 4–2–5
- Home stadium: Navy–Marine Corps Memorial Stadium

2026 American Conference football standings
	Conf.			Overall
Team	W		L	W		L
UTSA	6	–	1	9	–	2
Memphis	5	–	2	8	–	3
East Carolina	5	–	2	7	–	4
North Texas	5	–	2	7	–	4
UAB	4	–	3	6	–	5
Army	4	–	3	5	–	5
Tulsa	4	–	3	7	–	4
Florida Atlantic	4	–	3	7	–	4
Tulane	4	–	3	6	–	5
Navy	3	–	4	4	–	6
South Florida	2	–	5	6	–	5
Rice	1	–	6	2	–	9
Charlotte	1	–	6	1	–	10
Temple	1	–	6	2	–	9
Championship: December 5, 2026
As of November 22, 2026; Rankings from AP poll

The 2026 Navy Midshipmen football team represents the United States Naval Academy (Navy) as a member of the American Conference during the 2026 NCAA Division I FBS football season. They are led by fourth-year head coach Brian Newberry and play their home games at Navy–Marine Corps Memorial Stadium in Annapolis, Maryland.

== Schedule ==
Date	Time	Opponent	Site	TV	Result	Attendance
September 5	3:30 p.m.	Towson*	Navy–Marine Corps Memorial Stadium; Annapolis, MD	CBSSN	W 42–15	32,654
September 12	7:30 p.m.	at Florida Atlantic	Flagler Credit Union Stadium; Boca Raton, FL	ESPNU	L 30–38	22,273
September 25	7:00 p.m.	at UAB	Protective Stadium; Birmingham, AL	ESPN	L 20–24	24,647
October 3	12:00 p.m.	at Air Force*	Falcon Stadium; USAF Academy, CO (Commander-in-Chief's Trophy)	CBS	L 9–14	39,441
October 10	3:30 p.m.	Tulsa	Navy–Marine Corps Memorial Stadium; Annapolis, MD	CBSSN	W 34–26	30,963
October 17	8:00 p.m.	at UTSA	Alamodome; San Antonio, TX	ESPNU	L 34–38	23,297
October 24	3:30 p.m.	North Texas^{†}	Navy–Marine Corps Memorial Stadium; Annapolis, MD	CBSSN	L 39–49	33,166
October 31	12:00 p.m.	vs. No. 5 Notre Dame*	Gillette Stadium; Foxborough, MA (Rip Miller Trophy)	ABC	L 13–35	61,293
November 7	3:30 p.m.	Temple	Navy–Marine Corps Memorial Stadium; Annapolis, MD	CBSSN	W 42–35	31,132
November 21	12:00 p.m.	Memphis	Navy–Marine Corps Memorial Stadium; Annapolis, MD	ESPN2	W 38–34	29,080
November 28	12:00 p.m.	at Charlotte	Jerry Richardson Stadium; Charlotte, NC	ESPN+		
December 12	3:00 p.m.	vs. Army*	MetLife Stadium; East Rutherford, NJ (Army–Navy Game, Commander-in-Chief's Trophy, College Gameday)	CBS		
*Non-conference game; ^{†}Homecoming; Rankings from AP Poll (and CFP Rankings, after November 3) – Released prior to game; All times are in Eastern time

== Game summaries ==
=== Towson (FCS) ===
Towson Tigers (FCS) (0–1) at Navy Midshipmen (0–0) – Game summary

Quarter	1	2	3	4	Total
Tigers (FCS)	0	12	3	0	15
Midshipmen	14	14	7	7	42

at Navy–Marine Corps Memorial Stadium • Annapolis, Maryland

- Date: September 5
- Game time: 3:30 p.m. EDT
- Game weather: Cloudy • Temperature: 80 °F (27 °C) • Wind: NE at 6 miles per hour (9.7 km/h)
- Game attendance: 32,654
- Referee: Matt Overton
- TV announcers (CBSSN): Chris Lewis, Randy Cross and Brandon Baylor

Game information

First quarter

- NAVY – Braxton Woodson 38-yard run (Nolan Bartley kick), 10:21. Midshipmen 7–0. Drive: 6 plays, 75 yards, 3:01.
- NAVY – Vic Listorti 35-yard run (Nolan Bartley kick), 3:37. Midshipmen 14–0. Drive: 9 plays, 88 yards, 4:16.

Second quarter

- TOW – Aaron Enterline 48-yard pass from Andrew Indorf (Zaydaan Faridi kick failed), 14:52. Midshipmen 14–6. Drive: 7 plays, 75 yards, 3:45.
- NAVY – Jackson Gutierrez 3-yard run (Nolan Bartley kick), 9:32. Midshipmen 21–6. Drive: 11 plays, 64 yards, 5:12.
- TOW – Jacob Zollar 30-yard pass from Andrew Indorf (pass failed), 7:50. Midshipmen 21–12. Drive: 4 plays, 75 yards, 1:42.
- NAVY – Braxton Woodson 8-yard run (Nolan Bartley kick), 0:24. Midshipmen 28–12. Drive: 8 plays, 50 yards, 1:48.

Third quarter

- NAVY – Jackson Gutierrez 2-yard run (Nolan Bartley kick), 7:46. Midshipmen 35–12. Drive: 13 plays, 75 yards, 7:14.
- TOW – Zaydaan Faridi 40-yard field goal, 3:14. Midshipmen 35–15. Drive: 8 plays, 53 yards, 4:32.

Fourth quarter

- NAVY – Braxton Woodson 4-yard run (Nolan Bartley kick), 8:39. Midshipmen 42–15. Drive: 12 plays, 65 yards, 6:04.

Statistics	TOW	NAVY
First downs	13	30
Plays–yards	39–246	79–527
Rushes–yards	20–39	73–506
Passing yards	207	21
Passing: comp–att–int	14–19–0	3–6–0
Turnovers	0	0
Time of possession	20:10	39:50

Team	Category	Player	Statistics
Towson	Passing	Andrew Indorf	13/18, 208 yards, 2 TD
Towson	Rushing	Kemarrion Battles	8 carries, 25 yards
Towson	Receiving	Aaron Enterline	2 receptions, 69 yards, TD
Navy	Passing	Braxton Woodson	3/6, 21 yards
Navy	Rushing	Braxton Woodson	23 carries, 200 yards, 3 TD
Navy	Receiving	Michael Barrow	2 receptions, 11 yards

=== at Florida Atlantic ===
Navy Midshipmen (1–0) at Florida Atlantic Owls (0–1) – Game summary

Quarter	1	2	3	4	Total
Midshipmen	7	0	7	16	30
Owls	14	17	7	0	38

at Flagler Credit Union Stadium • Boca Raton, Florida

- Date: September 12
- Game time: 7:30 p.m. EDT
- Game weather: Cloudy • Temperature: 81 °F (27 °C) • Wind: SE at 6 miles per hour (9.7 km/h)
- Game attendance: 22,273
- Referee: Charles Lamertina
- TV announcers (ESPNU): Courtney Lyle and Rene Ingoglia

Game information

First quarter

- FAU – Easton Messer 76-yard pass from Caden Veltkamp (Collin Rogers kick), 14:18. Owls 7–0. Drive: 2 plays, 75 yards, 0:42.
- NAVY – Braxton Woodson 48-yard run (Nolan Bartley kick), 13:12. Tied 7–7. Drive: 3 plays, 75 yards, 1:06.
- FAU – Easton Messer 36-yard pass from Caden Veltkamp (Collin Rogers kick), 6:59. Owls 14–7. Drive: 3 plays, 72 yards, 0:45.

Second quarter

- FAU – Kelby Valsin 30-yard pass from Caden Veltkamp (Collin Rogers kick), 5:26. Owls 21–7. Drive: 9 plays, 79 yards, 4:25.
- FAU – Dominique Henry 13-yard pass from Caden Veltkamp (Collin Rogers kick), 0:19. Owls 28–7. Drive: 9 plays, 75 yards, 2:17.
- FAU – Collin Rogers 60-yard field goal, 0:00. Owls 31–7. Drive: 2 plays, 5 yards, 0:07.

Third quarter

- FAU – AJ Johnson 5-yard pass from Caden Veltkamp (Collin Rogers kick), 2:39. Owls 38–7. Drive: 16 plays, 80 yards, 7:13.
- NAVY – Jordan Collins 64-yard pass from Jackson Gutierrez (Nolan Bartley kick), 1:16. Owls 38–14. Drive: 3 plays, 75 yards, 1:23.

Fourth quarter

- NAVY – Charles Robinson 8-yard pass from Jackson Gutierrez (run failed), 5:41. Owls 38–20. Drive: 11 plays, 85 yards, 5:31.
- NAVY – Team safety, 3:12. Owls 38–22.
- NAVY – Jackson Gutierrez 49-yard run (Jackson Gutierrez–Vic Listorti pass), 1:46. Owls 38–30. Drive: 6 plays, 58 yards, 1:21.

Statistics	NAVY	FAU
First downs	18	27
Plays–yards	60–393	78–373
Rushes–yards	37–246	45–(-8)
Passing yards	147	386
Passing: comp–att–int	9–23–1	27–33–0
Turnovers	2	0
Time of possession	26:10	33:50

Team	Category	Player	Statistics
Navy	Passing	Jackson Gutierrez	6/12, 100 yards, 2 TD
Navy	Rushing	Braxton Woodson	12 carries, 96 yards, TD
Navy	Receiving	Jordan Collins	2 receptions, 68 yards, TD
Florida Atlantic	Passing	Caden Veltkamp	27/32, 386 yards, 5 TD
Florida Atlantic	Rushing	Ethan Ervin	17 carries, 67 yards
Florida Atlantic	Receiving	Easton Messer	8 receptions, 179 yards, 2 TD

=== at UAB ===
Navy Midshipmen (1–1) at UAB Blazers (1–2) – Game summary

Quarter	1	2	3	4	Total
Midshipmen	0	13	7	0	20
Blazers	0	17	0	7	24

at Protective Stadium • Birmingham, Alabama

- Date: September 25
- Game time: 7:00 p.m. EDT
- Game weather: Cloudy • Temperature: 77 °F (25 °C) • Wind: N at 6 miles per hour (9.7 km/h)
- Game attendance: 24,647
- Referee: Kevin Randall
- TV announcers (ESPN): Anish Shroff, Andre Ware, and Morgan Uber

Statistics	NAVY	UAB
First downs	24	15
Plays–yards	71–353	54–290
Rushes–yards	58–249	34–116
Passing yards	104	174
Passing: comp–att–int	4–13–0	13–20–1
Turnovers	2	1
Time of possession	34:22	25:38

Team	Category	Player	Statistics
Navy	Passing	Jackson Gutierrez	4/13, 104 yards
Navy	Rushing	Jackson Gutierrez	34 carries, 134 yards, TD
Navy	Receiving	Vic Listorti	1 reception, 39 yards
Navy	Receiving	Truman Brasfield	1 reception, 39 yards
UAB	Passing	Ryder Burton	13/20, 174 yards, TD, INT
UAB	Rushing	Braylon McReynolds	8 carries, 71 yards, 2 TD
UAB	Receiving	Ty Mims	3 receptions, 76 yards, TD

=== at Air Force (Commander-in-Chief's Trophy) ===
Navy Midshipmen (1–2) at Air Force Falcons (2–1) – Game summary

Quarter	1	2	3	4	Total
Midshipmen	0	3	6	0	9
Falcons	0	14	0	0	14

at Falcon Stadium • USAF Academy, Colorado

- Date: October 3
- Game time: 12:00 p.m. EDT
- Game weather: Sunny • Temperature: 71 °F (22 °C) • Wind: NW at 9 mph
- Game attendance: 39,441
- Referee: Tim Rich
- TV announcers (CBS): Rich Waltz (play-by-play), Adam Breneman (analyst),Brian Kelly (analyst) and Jordan Giorgio (sideline)

Game information

First quarter
Second quarter
Third quarter
Fourth quarter

Statistics	NAVY	AFA
First downs	11	17
Plays–yards	48–253	71–270
Rushes–yards	30–110	59–188
Passing yards	143	82
Passing: comp–att–int	8–18–0	6–12–2
Turnovers	1	2
Time of possession	23:59	36:01

Team	Category	Player	Statistics
Navy	Passing	Jackson Gutierrez	7/15, 140 yards, TD
Navy	Rushing	Michael Barrow	9 carries, 44 yards
Navy	Receiving	Truman Brasfield	1 reception, 68 yards, TD
Air Force	Passing	Liam Szarka	6/11, 82 yards, 2 INT
Air Force	Rushing	Liam Szarka	25 carries, 81 yards, 2 TD
Air Force	Receiving	Jonah Dawson	3 receptions, 39 yards

=== Tulsa ===
Tulsa Golden Hurricane (3–2) at Navy Midshipmen (1–3) – Game summary

Quarter	1	2	3	4	Total
Golden Hurricane	14	6	6	0	26
Midshipmen	7	7	6	14	34

at Navy–Marine Corps Memorial Stadium • Annapolis, Maryland

- Date: October 10
- Game time: 3:30 p.m. EDT
- Game weather: Cloudy • Temperature: 71 °F (22 °C) • Wind: NE at 5 mph
- Game attendance: 30,963
- Referee: Reid Jackson
- TV announcers (CBSSN): John Sadak (play-by-play), Randy Cross (analyst), and Brandon Baylor (sideline)

Statistics	TLSA	NAVY
First downs	16	24
Plays–yards	67–376	74–481
Rushes–yards	28–98	67–386
Passing yards	278	95
Passing: comp–att–int	22–39–0	5–7–1
Turnovers	0	4
Time of possession	25:29	34:31

Team	Category	Player	Statistics
Tulsa	Passing	Baylor Hayes	21/38, 268 yards, TD
Tulsa	Rushing	Javon Ross	2 carries, 36 yards
Tulsa	Receiving	Javon Ross	7 receptions, 90 yards
Navy	Passing	Jackson Gutierrez	5/7, 95 yards, TD, INT
Navy	Rushing	Jackson Gutierrez	41 carries, 232 yards, 3 TD
Navy	Receiving	Truman Brasfield	1 receptions, 58 yards, TD

=== at UTSA ===
Navy Midshipmen (2–3) at UTSA Roadrunners (5–1) – Game summary

Quarter	1	2	3	4	Total
Midshipmen	7	13	0	14	34
Roadrunners	0	21	3	14	38

at Alamodome • San Antonio, Texas

- Date: October 17
- Game time: 8:00 p.m. EDT
- Game attendance: 23,297
- Referee: Kevin Randall
- TV announcers (ESPNU): Ted Emrich (play-by-play) and Fozzy Whittaker (analyst)

Statistics	NAVY	UTSA
First downs	17	22
Plays–yards	56–477	70–469
Rushes–yards	48–294	32–110
Passing yards	183	359
Passing: comp–att–int	4–8–0	28–38–0
Turnovers	0	0
Time of possession	28:15	31:45

Team	Category	Player	Statistics
Navy	Passing	Jackson Gutierrez	3/7, 120 yards, 2 TD
Navy	Rushing	Jackson Gutierrez	21 carries, 139 yards, 2 TD
Navy	Receiving	Jordan Collins	2 receptions, 117 yards, 2 TD
UTSA	Passing	Owen McCown	28/38, 359 yards, 3 TD
UTSA	Rushing	Will Henderson III	16 carries, 78 yards, TD
UTSA	Receiving	David Amador II	7 receptions, 71 yards

=== North Texas ===
North Texas Mean Green (4–2) at Navy Midshipmen (2–4) – Game summary

Quarter	1	2	Total
Mean Green			0
Midshipmen			0

at Navy–Marine Corps Memorial Stadium • Annapolis, Maryland

- Date: October 24
- Game time: 3:30 p.m. EDT
- TV announcers (CBSSN): John Sadak (play-by-play), Randy Cross (analyst) and Brandon Baylor (sideline)

Statistics	UNT	NAVY
First downs		
Plays–yards		
Rushes–yards		
Passing yards		
Passing: comp–att–int		
Time of possession		

Team	Category	Player	Statistics
North Texas	Passing		
North Texas	Rushing		
North Texas	Receiving		
Navy	Passing		
Navy	Rushing		
Navy	Receiving		

=== vs. No. 5 Notre Dame (rivalry) ===
No. 5 Notre Dame Fighting Irish (6–1) vs. Navy Midshipmen (2–5) – Game summary

Quarter	1	2	3	4	Total
No. 5 Fighting Irish	7	7	14	7	35
Midshipmen	3	10	0	0	13

at Gillette Stadium • Foxborough, Massachusetts

- Date: October 31
- Game time: 12:00 p.m. EDT
- TV announcers (ABC): Bob Wischusen (play-by-play), Louis Riddick (analyst), and Stormy Buonantony (sideline)

Game information

First quarter
Second quarter
Third quarter
Fourth quarter

Statistics	ND	NAVY
First downs		
Plays–yards		
Rushes–yards		
Passing yards		
Passing: comp–att–int		
Turnovers		
Time of possession		

Team	Category	Player	Statistics
Notre Dame	Passing		
Notre Dame	Rushing		
Notre Dame	Receiving		
Navy	Passing		
Navy	Rushing		
Navy	Receiving		

=== Temple ===
Temple Owls (2–6) at Navy Midshipmen (2–6) – Game summary

Quarter	1	2	Total
Owls			0
Midshipmen			0

at Navy–Marine Corps Memorial Stadium • Annapolis, Maryland

- Date: November 7
- Game time: 3:30 p.m. EST

Statistics	TEM	NAVY
First downs		
Plays–yards		
Rushes–yards		
Passing yards		
Passing: comp–att–int		
Time of possession		

Team	Category	Player	Statistics
Temple	Passing		
Temple	Rushing		
Temple	Receiving		
Navy	Passing		
Navy	Rushing		
Navy	Receiving		

=== Memphis ===
Memphis Tigers (8–2) at Navy Midshipmen (3–6) – Game summary

Quarter	1	2	Total
Tigers			0
Midshipmen			0

at Navy–Marine Corps Memorial Stadium • Annapolis, Maryland

- Date: November 21
- Game time: 12:00 p.m. EST
- TV announcers (ESPN2): Anish Shroff (play-by-play), Andre Ware (analyst), and Morgan Uber (sideline)

Statistics	MEM	NAVY
First downs		
Plays–yards		
Rushes–yards		
Passing yards		
Passing: comp–att–int		
Time of possession		

Team	Category	Player	Statistics
Memphis	Passing		
Memphis	Rushing		
Memphis	Receiving		
Navy	Passing		
Navy	Rushing		
Navy	Receiving		

=== at Charlotte ===
Navy Midshipmen (4–6) at Charlotte 49ers (1–10) – Game summary

Quarter	1	2	Total
Midshipmen			0
49ers			0

at Jerry Richardson Stadium • Charlotte, North Carolina

- Date: November 28
- Game time: TBD

Statistics	NAVY	CLT
First downs		
Plays–yards		
Rushes–yards		
Passing yards		
Passing: comp–att–int		
Time of possession		

Team	Category	Player	Statistics
Navy	Passing		
Navy	Rushing		
Navy	Receiving		
Charlotte	Passing		
Charlotte	Rushing		
Charlotte	Receiving		

=== vs. Army (Army–Navy Game) ===
Navy Midshipmen (0–0) vs. Army Black Knights (0–0) – Game summary

Quarter	1	2	Total
Midshipmen			0
Black Knights			0

at MetLife Stadium • East Rutherford, New Jersey

- Date: December 12
- Game time: 3:00 p.m. EST
- TV announcers (CBS): Brad Nessler, Charles Davis and Jenny Dell

Statistics	NAVY	ARMY
First downs		
Plays–yards		
Rushes–yards		
Passing yards		
Passing: comp–att–int		
Time of possession		

Team	Category	Player	Statistics
Navy	Passing		
Navy	Rushing		
Navy	Receiving		
Army	Passing		
Army	Rushing		
Army	Receiving		
