= Quinn Henicle =

American football player

No. 10 – Old Dominion Monarchs
- Position: Quarterback
- Class: Redshirt Sophomore

Personal information
- Listed height: 6 ft 2 in (1.88 m)
- Listed weight: 215 lb (98 kg)

Career information
- High school: Downingtown (Downingtown, Pennsylvania)
- College: Old Dominion (2024–present)
- Stats at ESPN

Quinn Henicle is an American football quarterback for the Old Dominion Monarchs.

== Early life ==
Henicle attended Downingtown High School in Downingtown, Pennsylvania, and committed to play college football for the Old Dominion Monarchs.

== College career ==
In week 3 of the 2024 season, Henicle ran for a 65-yard touchdown versus Virginia Tech. In the 2024 regular season finale, he made his first career start, completing 9 of 12 pass attempts for 143 yards and two touchdowns, while adding 206 yards and two touchdowns on the ground in a win over Arkansas State. Henicle finished the 2024 season completing 14 of 25 pass attempts for 181 yards and two touchdowns, while rushing for 278 yards and three touchdowns. In the 2025 Cure Bowl, he completed 11 of 25 pass attempts for 127 yards and rushed for 107 yards and two touchdowns in a victory over South Florida. Heading into the 2026 season, Henicle was named the Monarchs starting quarterback.
