= Lane Wadle =

American football player (born 2005)

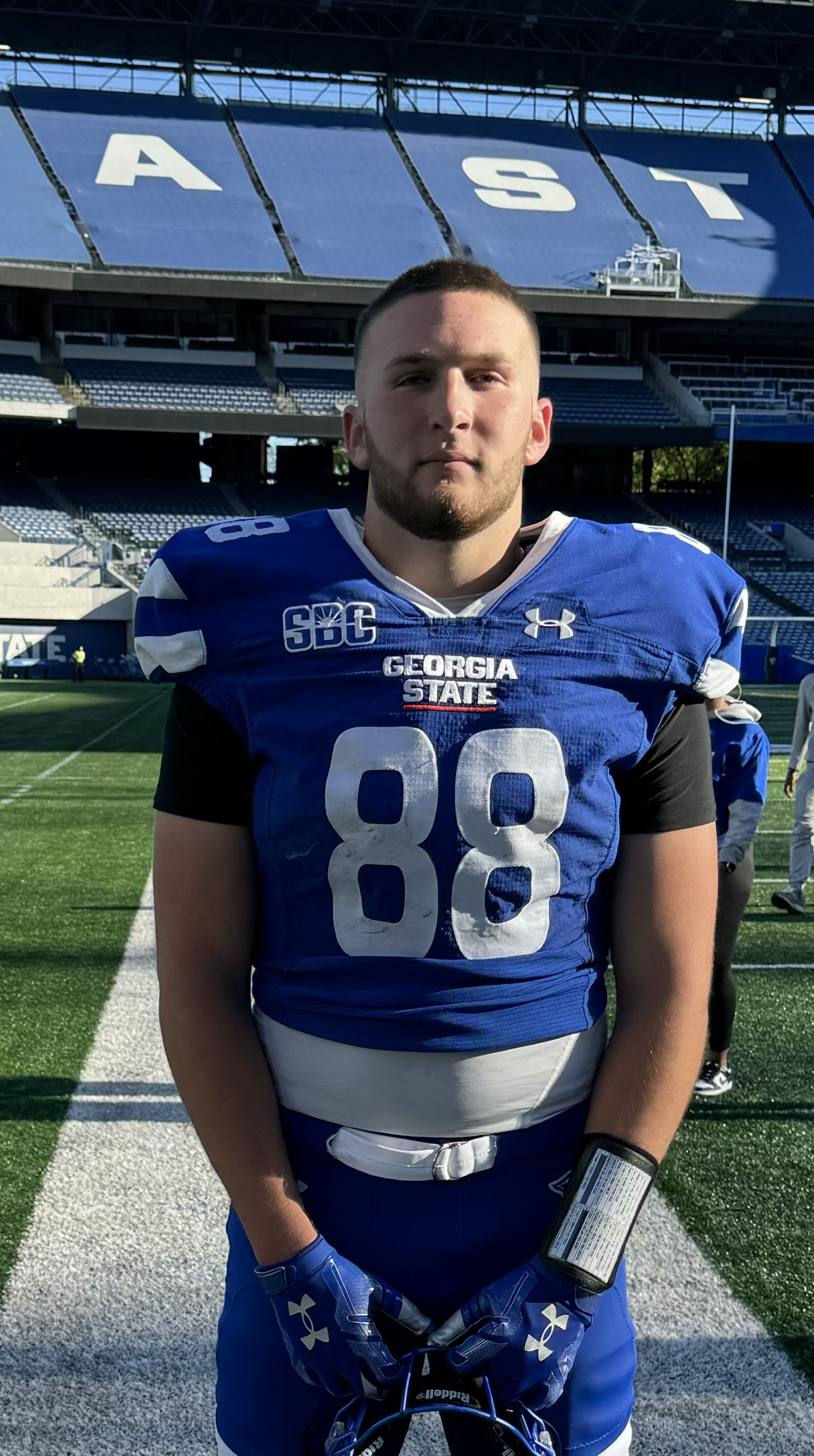
- Wadle at the Georgia State Spring Game in 2024

No. 88 – Charlotte 49ers
- Position: Tight end
- Class: Junior

Personal information
- Born: December 20, 2005 (age 20); Greenfield, Indiana, U.S.
- Listed height: 6 ft 5 in (1.96 m)
- Listed weight: 245 lb (111 kg)

Career information
- High school: Greenfield-Central (Greenfield, Indiana)
- College: Georgia State (2024–2025)

Lane Daniel Wadle (born December 20, 2005) is an American college football tight end. He previously played for the Georgia State Panthers. Currently he plays for Charlotte 49ers football.

== Early life ==
Wadle was born on December 20, 2005, in Greenfield, Indiana. He later attended Greenfield Central High School. His freshman season in 2020 was largely interrupted due to COVID-19. He became a standout football player there, finishing his high school career with 28 receptions for 245 yards and 5 touchdowns.

Considered to be a top prospect from Indiana, he was previously committed to attend Georgia Tech University and Northern Illinois University. However, he de-committed from both of these universities prior to signing his National Letter of Intent on December 20, 2023, instead committing to play at Georgia State University.

He was deemed a nationally 3-star rated player by 247sports and On3 recruiting platforms and was considered by 247sports to be in the top 1.5% of all 2024 recruits. He was also selected as ESPN's 18th highest nationally ranked tight end prospect in the class of 2024.
