= 2026 Army Black Knights football team =

American college football season

2026 Army Black Knights football
- Conference: American Conference
- Record: 5–5 (4–3 American)
- Head coach: Jeff Monken (13th season)
- Offensive coordinator: Cody Worley (3rd season)
- Offensive scheme: Triple option
- Defensive coordinator: Daryl Dixon (1st season)
- Base defense: 3–4
- Home stadium: Michie Stadium

2026 American Conference football standings
	Conf.			Overall
Team	W		L	W		L
UTSA	6	–	1	9	–	2
Memphis	5	–	2	8	–	3
East Carolina	5	–	2	7	–	4
North Texas	5	–	2	7	–	4
UAB	4	–	3	6	–	5
Army	4	–	3	5	–	5
Tulsa	4	–	3	7	–	4
Florida Atlantic	4	–	3	7	–	4
Tulane	4	–	3	6	–	5
Navy	3	–	4	4	–	6
South Florida	2	–	5	6	–	5
Rice	1	–	6	2	–	9
Charlotte	1	–	6	1	–	10
Temple	1	–	6	2	–	9
Championship: December 5, 2026
As of November 22, 2026; Rankings from AP poll

The 2026 Army Black Knights football team is who represents the United States Military Academy (Army) in the American Conference during the 2026 NCAA Division I FBS football season. The Black Knights are led by Jeff Monken for now his 13th year as head coach of the team, and play their home games at Michie Stadium, which is located on the academy grounds in West Point, New York.

== Schedule ==
Date	Time	Opponent	Site	TV	Result	Attendance
September 5	12:00 p.m.	Bryant*	Michie Stadium; West Point, New York	CBSSN	W 59–3	21,538
September 12	12:00 p.m.	South Florida	Michie Stadium; West Point, New York	CBSSN	L 24–28	23,670
September 25	4:00 p.m.	at Temple	Lincoln Financial Field; Philadelphia, Pennsylvania	ESPN	W 21–17	13,449
October 3	7:30 p.m.	at Louisiana Tech*	Joe Aillet Stadium; Ruston, Louisiana	ESPN+	L 29–31	18,326
October 10	12:00 p.m.	Tulane	Michie Stadium; West Point, New York	CBSSN	W 20–17	29,722
October 17	12:00 p.m.	Florida Atlantic	Michie Stadium; West Point, New York	CBSSN	W 56–24	28,537
October 23	8:30 p.m.	at Tulsa	H.A. Chapman Stadium; Tulsa, Oklahoma	ESPN2	W 38–35	20,247
October 31	8:00 p.m.	at Memphis	Simmons Bank Liberty Stadium; Memphis, Tennessee	ESPNU	L 22–49	32,502
November 7	7:30 p.m.	Air Force*	Michie Stadium; West Point, New York (Commander-in-Chief's Trophy, Big Noon Kickoff)	CBS	L 21–24	33,575
November 21	12:00 p.m.	East Carolina	Michie Stadium; West Point, New York	CBSSN	L 6–10	26,425
November 28	2:00 p.m.	at Rice	First Community Stadium; Houston, Texas	ESPN+		
December 12	3:00 p.m.	vs. Navy*	MetLife Stadium; East Rutherford, New Jersey (Army-Navy Game, Commander-in-Chief's Trophy, College Gameday)	CBS		
*Non-conference game; All times are in Eastern time

== Game summaries ==
=== Bryant (FCS) ===
Bryant Bulldogs (FCS) (1–0) at Army Black Knights (0–0) – Game summary

Quarter	1	2	3	4	Total
Bulldogs (FCS)	0	3	0	0	3
Black Knights	21	10	14	14	59

at Michie Stadium • West Point, New York

- Date: September 5
- Game time: 12:00 p.m. EDT
- Game attendance: 21,538
- TV announcers (CBSSN): Jack Gordon, Taylor McHargue and Tina Cervasio

Game information

First quarter

- ARMY – Zach Mundell 15-yard run (Dawson Jones kick), 11:05. Black Knights 7–0. Drive: 5 plays, 39 yards, 2:18.
- ARMY – Cale Hellums 27-yard run (Dawson Jones kick), 7:36. Black Knights 14–0. Drive: 5 plays, 72 yards, 1:59.
- ARMY – Cale Hellums 37-yard run (Dawson Jones kick), 0:54. Black Knights 21–0. Drive: 10 plays, 75 yards, 4:54.

Second quarter

- ARMY – Brady Anderson 30-yard run (Dawson Jones kick), 7:24. Black Knights 28–0. Drive: 8 plays, 67 yards, 4:12.
- BRY – Nicholas Stoyanovich 28-yard field goal, 2:09. Black Knights 28–3. Drive: 12 plays, 64 yards, 5:09.
- ARMY – Dawson Jones 37-yard field goal, 0:48. Black Knights 31–3. Drive: 9 plays, 55 yards, 1:21.

Third quarter

- ARMY – Zach Mundell 66-yard run (Dawson Jones kick), 13:20. Black Knights 38–3. Drive: 3 plays, 72 yards, 1:32.
- ARMY – Godspower Nawauihe 2-yard run (Dawson Jones kick), 10:21. Black Knights 45–3. Drive: 3 plays, 29 yards, 1:06.

Fourth quarter

- ARMY – Carson Smith 6-yard run (Bryson Hosea kick), 10:43. Black Knights 52–3. Drive: 8 plays, 82 yards, 4:54.
- ARMY – Ethan Washington 1-yard run (Bryson Hosea kick), 5:12. Black Knights 59–3. Drive: 7 plays, 46 yards, 3:51.

Statistics	BRY	ARMY
First downs	9	31
Plays–yards	53–165	70–648
Rushes–yards	30–67	57–569
Passing yards	98	79
Passing: comp–att–int	11–23–0	7–13–0
Turnovers	0	0
Time of possession	27:02	32:58

Team	Category	Player	Statistics
Bryant	Passing	Brennan Myer	9/18, 88 yards
Bryant	Rushing	Jordan Bennett	8 carries, 29 yards
Bryant	Receiving	Keylijah Williams	1 reception, 24 yards
Army	Passing	Cale Hellums	4/9, 59 yards
Army	Rushing	Zach Mundell	4 carries, 105 yards, 2 TD
Army	Receiving	Samari Howard	3 receptions, 52 yards

=== South Florida ===
South Florida Bulls (1–0) at Army Black Knights (1–0) – Game summary

Quarter	1	2	3	4	Total
Bulls	7	0	7	14	28
Black Knights	0	14	0	10	24

at Michie Stadium • West Point, New York

- Date: September 12
- Game time: 12:00 p.m. EDT
- Game weather: Sunny • Temperature: 73 °F (23 °C) • Wind: S at 6 miles per hour (9.7 km/h)
- Game attendance: 23,670
- Referee: Kevin Randall
- TV announcers (CBSSN): Jack Gordon, Taylor McHargue and Tina Cervasio

Game information

First quarter

- USF – Bryson Rodgers 7-yard pass from Michael Van Buren Jr. (Nico Gramatica kick), 11:00. Bulls 7–0. Drive: 7 plays, 75 yards, 4:00.

Second quarter

- ARMY – Zach Mundell 24-yard pass from Cale Hellums (Dawson Jones kick), 11:48. Tied 7–7. Drive: 11 plays, 90 yards, 6:14.
- ARMY – Godspower Nwawuihe 4-yard pass from Cale Hellums (Dawson Jones kick), 0:19. Black Knights 14–0. Drive: 19 plays, 92 yards, 9:57.

Third quarter

- USF – Michael Van Buren Jr. 18-yard run (Nico Gramatica kick), 9:03. Tied 14–14. Drive: 8 plays, 74 yards, 4:00.

Fourth quarter

- ARMY – Dawson Jones 27-yard field goal, 14:05. Black Knights 17–14. Drive: 9 plays, 44 yards, 4:16.
- ARMY – Godspeed Nwawuihe 10-yard run (Dawson Jones kick), 5:06. Black Knights 24–14. Drive: 9 plays, 80 yards, 5:57.
- USF – Michael Van Buren Jr. 24-yard run (Nico Gramatica kick), 3:20. Black Knights 24–21. Drive: 6 plays, 75 yards, 1:47.
- USF – Joshua Porter 38-yard pass from Michael Van Buren Jr. (Nico Gramatica kick), 0:23. Bulls 28–24. Drive: 10 plays, 81 yards, 1:27.

Statistics	USF	ARMY
First downs	21	21
Plays–yards	55–369	62–347
Rushes–yards	25–130	51–219
Passing yards	239	128
Passing: comp–att–int	19–30–1	10–11–0
Turnovers	0	1
Time of possession	24:14	35:46

Team	Category	Player	Statistics
South Florida	Passing	Michael Van Buren Jr.	19/30, 239 yards, 2 TD
South Florida	Rushing	Michael Van Buren Jr.	5 carries, 45 yards, 2 TD
South Florida	Receiving	Joshua Porter	3 receptions, 67 yards, TD
Army	Passing	Cale Hellums	9/10, 91 yards, 2 TD
Army	Rushing	Godspower Nwawuihe	20 carries, 94 yards, TD
Army	Receiving	Zach Mundell	3 receptions, 47 yards, TD

=== at Temple ===
Army Black Knights (1–1) at Temple Owls (1–2) – Game summary

Quarter	1	2	3	4	Total
Black Knights	7	0	7	7	21
Owls	7	0	7	3	17

at Lincoln Financial Field • Philadelphia, Pennsylvania

- Date: September 25
- Game time: 4:00 p.m. EDT
- Game weather: Cloudy • Temperature: 68 °F (20 °C)
- Game attendance: 13,449
- Referee: Tim Rich
- TV announcers (ESPN): Clay Matvick (play-by-play) and Rocky Boiman (analyst)

Statistics	ARMY	TEM
First downs	22	17
Plays–yards	63–315	52–459
Rushes–yards	57–279	32–217
Passing yards	36	242
Passing: comp–att–int	3–6–0	11–20–0
Turnovers	0	0
Time of possession	38:01	21:59

Team	Category	Player	Statistics
Army	Passing	Cale Hellums	3/6, 36 yards
Army	Rushing	Cale Hellums	22 carries, 104 yards, 3 TD
Army	Receiving	Godspower Nwawuihe	1 receptions, 20 yards
Temple	Passing	Ajani Sheppard	11/20, 242 yards, 2 TD
Temple	Rushing	Samuel Brown	10 carries, 96 yards
Temple	Receiving	Samuel Brown	1 reception, 78 yards, TD

=== at Louisiana Tech ===
Army Black Knights (2–1) at Louisiana Tech Bulldogs (1–2) – Game summary

Quarter	1	2	3	4	Total
Black Knights	7	0	8	14	29
Bulldogs	7	7	14	3	31

at Joe Aillet Stadium • Ruston, Louisiana

- Date: October 3
- Game time: 7:30 p.m. EDT
- Game weather: Cloudy • Temperature: 82 °F (28 °C) • Wind: SW at 9 miles per hour (14 km/h)
- Game attendance: 18,326
- Referee: Scott Broadway
- TV announcers (ESPN+): Malcolm Butler (play-by-play) and Luke McCown (analyst)

Statistics	ARMY	LT
First downs	25	20
Plays–yards	69–421	57–503
Rushes–yards	45–270	33–244
Passing yards	151	259
Passing: comp–att–int	12–24–1	17–24–0
Turnovers	1	0
Time of possession	32:05	27:55

Team	Category	Player	Statistics
Army	Passing	Cale Hellums	12/24, 151 yards, TD, INT
Army	Rushing	Samari Howard	12 carries, 158 yards, TD
Army	Receiving	Brady Anderson	4 receptions, 79 yards
Louisiana Tech	Passing	Trey Kukuk	16/22, 185 yards
Louisiana Tech	Rushing	Dylone Brooks	7 carries, 119 yards, TD
Louisiana Tech	Receiving	Dylone Brooks	2 receptions, 81 yards, TD

=== Tulane ===
Tulane Green Wave (2–2) at Army Black Knights (2–2) – Game summary

Quarter	1	2	3	4	Total
Green Wave	0	3	7	7	17
Black Knights	7	0	0	13	20

at Michie Stadium • West Point, New York

- Date: October 10
- Game time: 12:00 p.m. EDT
- Game weather: Sunny • Temperature: 61 °F (16 °C) • Wind: N at 5 miles per hour (8.0 km/h)
- Game attendance: 29,722
- Referee: Kevin Randall
- TV announcers (CBSSN): Jack Gordon (play-by-play), Taylor McHargue (analyst) and Tina Cervasio (sideline)

Statistics	TULN	ARMY
First downs	15	19
Plays–yards	52–280	65–348
Rushes–yards	26–122	59–329
Passing yards	158	19
Passing: comp–att–int	14–26–1	3–6–0
Turnovers	1	0
Time of possession	24:26	35:34

Team	Category	Player	Statistics
Tulane	Passing	Kadin Semonza	14/26, 158 yards, TD, INT
Tulane	Rushing	Johnnie Daniels	8 carries, 67 yards
Tulane	Receiving	Destyn Hill	5 receptions, 54 yards
Army	Passing	Cale Hellums	3/6, 19 yards
Army	Rushing	Cale Hellums	38 carries, 223 yards, 2 TD
Army	Receiving	Zach Mundell	1 reception, 11 yards

=== Florida Atlantic ===
Florida Atlantic Owls (4–1) at Army Black Knights (3–2) – Game summary

Quarter	1	2	3	4	Total
Owls	14	0	3	7	24
Black Knights	14	21	7	14	56

at Michie Stadium • West Point, New York

- Date: October 17
- Game time: 12:00 p.m. EDT
- Game weather: Cloudy • Temperature: 50 °F (10 °C) • Wind: N at 12 miles per hour (19 km/h)
- Game attendance: 28,537
- Referee: Edwin Lee
- TV announcers (CBSSN): Jack Gordon (play-by-play), Taylor McHargue (analyst) and Tina Cervasio (sideline)

Statistics	FAU	ARMY
First downs	28	22
Plays–yards	77–432	62–481
Rushes–yards	28–108	60–479
Passing yards	324	2
Passing: comp–att–int	34–49–1	1–2–0
Turnovers	3	0
Time of possession	27:12	32:48

Team	Category	Player	Statistics
Florida Atlantic	Passing	Caden Veltkamp	33/48, 318 yards, 3 TD, INT
Florida Atlantic	Rushing	Ethan Ervin	10 carries, 46 yards
Florida Atlantic	Receiving	Easton Messer	14 receptions, 102 yards, TD
Army	Passing	Cale Hellums	1/2, 2 yards
Army	Rushing	Cale Hellums	25 carries, 195 yards, 5 TD
Army	Receiving	Samari Howard	1 reception, 2 yards

=== at Tulsa ===
Army Black Knights (4–2) at Tulsa Golden Hurricane (4–3) – Game summary

Quarter	1	2	Total
Black Knights			0
Golden Hurricane			0

at Skelly Field at H. A. Chapman Stadium • Tulsa, Oklahoma

- Date: October 23
- Game time: 8:30 p.m. EDT
- TV announcers (ESPN2): Courtney Lyle (play-by-play) and Rene Ingoglia (analyst)

Statistics	ARMY	TLSA
First downs		
Plays–yards		
Rushes–yards		
Passing yards		
Passing: comp–att–int		
Turnovers		
Time of possession		

Team	Category	Player	Statistics
Army	Passing		
Army	Rushing		
Army	Receiving		
Tulsa	Passing		
Tulsa	Rushing		
Tulsa	Receiving		

=== at Memphis ===
Army Black Knights (5–2) at Memphis Tigers (6–2) – Game summary

Quarter	1	2	Total
Black Knights			0
Tigers			0

at Simmons Bank Liberty Stadium • Memphis, Tennessee

- Date: October 31
- Game time: TBD

Statistics	ARMY	MEM
First downs		
Plays–yards		
Rushes–yards		
Passing yards		
Passing: comp–att–int		
Time of possession		

Team	Category	Player	Statistics
Army	Passing		
Army	Rushing		
Army	Receiving		
Memphis	Passing		
Memphis	Rushing		
Memphis	Receiving		

=== Air Force (Commander-in-Chief's Trophy) ===
Air Force Falcons (6–2) at Army Black Knights (5–3) – Game summary

Quarter	1	2	Total
Falcons			0
Black Knights			0

at Michie Stadium • West Point, New York

- Date: November 7
- Game time: 7:30 p.m. EST
- TV: CBS

Game information

First quarter
Second quarter
Third quarter
Fourth quarter

Statistics	AFA	ARMY
First downs		
Plays–yards		
Rushes–yards		
Passing yards		
Passing: comp–att–int		
Turnovers		
Time of possession		

Team	Category	Player	Statistics
Air Force	Passing		
Air Force	Rushing		
Air Force	Receiving		
Army	Passing		
Army	Rushing		
Army	Receiving		

=== East Carolina ===
East Carolina Pirates (6–4) at Army Black Knights (5–4) – Game summary

Quarter	1	2	Total
Pirates			0
Black Knights			0

at Michie Stadium • West Point, New York

- Date: November 21
- Game time: 12:00 p.m. EST
- TV: CBSSN

Statistics	ECU	ARMY
First downs		
Plays–yards		
Rushes–yards		
Passing yards		
Passing: comp–att–int		
Time of possession		

Team	Category	Player	Statistics
East Carolina	Passing		
East Carolina	Rushing		
East Carolina	Receiving		
Army	Passing		
Army	Rushing		
Army	Receiving		

=== at Rice ===
Army Black Knights (5–5) at Rice Owls (2–9) – Game summary

Quarter	1	2	Total
Black Knights			0
Owls			0

at First Community Stadium • Houston, Texas

- Date: November 28
- Game time: TBD

Statistics	ARMY	RICE
First downs		
Plays–yards		
Rushes–yards		
Passing yards		
Passing: comp–att–int		
Time of possession		

Team	Category	Player	Statistics
Army	Passing		
Army	Rushing		
Army	Receiving		
Rice	Passing		
Rice	Rushing		
Rice	Receiving		

=== vs. Navy (Army–Navy Game) ===
Navy Midshipmen (0–0) vs. Army Black Knights (0–0) – Game summary

Quarter	1	2	Total
Midshipmen			0
Black Knights			0

at MetLife Stadium • East Rutherford, New Jersey

- Date: December 12
- Game time: 3:00 p.m. EST
- TV announcers (CBS): Brad Nessler, Charles Davis and Jenny Dell

Statistics	NAVY	ARMY
First downs		
Plays–yards		
Rushes–yards		
Passing yards		
Passing: comp–att–int		
Time of possession		

Team	Category	Player	Statistics
Navy	Passing		
Navy	Rushing		
Navy	Receiving		
Army	Passing		
Army	Rushing		
Army	Receiving		

== Coaching staff ==
Army Black Knights
Name	Position	Consecutive season at Army in current position	Previous position
Jeff Monken	Head coach	12th	Georgia Southern head coach (2010–2013)
Cody Worley	Offensive coordinator and quarterbacks coach	2nd	Army run game coordinator and quarterbacks coach (2023)
Daryl Dixon	Defensive coordinator	1st	Army cornerback coach (2019)
Sean Saturnio	Special teams coordinator	6th	Army tight ends coach (2018–2019)
John Loose	Assistant head coach and outside linebackers coach	6th	Army defensive coordinator (2019)
Cheston Blackshear	Tight ends coach	2nd	Florida offensive quality control (2022–2023)
Sean Cronin	Defensive line coach	4th	Colorado State linebackers coach (2020–2021)
Blake Powers	Running backs coach	2nd	Army tight ends coach (2023)
Aaron Smith	Wide receivers coach	4th	UConn wide receivers coach (2017–2021)
Justin Weaver	Inside linebackers coach	3rd	USMAPS (NY) head coach (2022)
Collin Shank	Defensive quality control	3rd	Army graduate assistant (2022)
Tristan Yeomans	Offensive quality control	3rd	Charlotte special teams assistant (2022)
