= 2024 Army Black Knights football team =

American college football season

2024 Army Black Knights football

AAC champion Independence Bowl champion

AAC Championship Game, W 35–14 vs. Tulane

Independence Bowl, W 27–6 vs. Louisiana Tech
- Conference: American Athletic Conference

Ranking
- Coaches: No. 21
- AP: No. 21
- Record: 12–2 (8–0 AAC)
- Head coach: Jeff Monken (11th season)
- Offensive coordinator: Cody Worley (1st season)
- Offensive scheme: Triple option
- Defensive coordinator: Nate Woody (5th season)
- Base defense: 3–4
- Home stadium: Michie Stadium

2024 American Athletic Conference football standings
	Conf.			Overall
Team	W		L	W		L
No. 21 Army y$	8	–	0	12	–	2
Tulane y	7	–	1	9	–	5
Navy	6	–	2	10	–	3
No. 24 Memphis	6	–	2	11	–	2
East Carolina	5	–	3	8	–	5
South Florida	4	–	4	7	–	6
UTSA	4	–	4	7	–	6
Charlotte	4	–	4	5	–	7
North Texas	3	–	5	6	–	7
Rice	3	–	5	4	–	8
Temple	2	–	6	3	–	9
UAB	2	–	6	3	–	9
Florida Atlantic	1	–	7	3	–	9
Tulsa	1	–	7	3	–	9
Championship: Army 35, Tulane 14
$ – Conference champion; y – Championship game participant; Rankings from AP Poll

The 2024 Army Black Knights football team represented the United States Military Academy in the American Athletic Conference (The American or AAC) during the 2024 NCAA Division I FBS football season. The Black Knights, led by Jeff Monken in his eleventh year as head coach, played their home games at Michie Stadium, located in West Point, New York.

The 2024 season was Army's first in The American after having spent almost all of its football history as an FBS independent. This was the fifth season under Monken that the Black Knights have had at least 9 wins, and the first season since 1949 to start 9–0. With their win in the Independence Bowl over Louisiana Tech, the team became the second armed services school to record 12 wins in a single season after the 1985 Air Force Falcons.

== Preseason ==
=== AAC media poll ===
The American Athletic Conference released its media prediction poll on July 23, 2024. The Black Knights were predicted to finish fifth in the conference.

== Schedule ==
Date	Time	Opponent	Rank	Site	TV	Result	Attendance
August 30	6:00 p.m.	Lehigh*		Michie Stadium; West Point, NY	CBSSN	W 42–7	23,760
September 7	12:00 p.m.	at Florida Atlantic		FAU Stadium; Boca Raton, FL	CBSSN	W 24–7	21,810
September 21	12:00 p.m.	Rice		Michie Stadium; West Point, NY	CBSSN	W 37–14	26,654
September 26	7:30 p.m.	at Temple		Lincoln Financial Field; Philadelphia, PA	ESPN	W 42–14	13,255
October 5	12:00 p.m.	at Tulsa		Skelly Field at H. A. Chapman Stadium; Tulsa, OK	ESPNU	W 49–7	24,409
October 12	12:00 p.m.	UAB		Michie Stadium; West Point, NY	CBSSN	W 44–10	29,002
October 19	12:00 p.m.	East Carolina	No. 23	Michie Stadium; West Point, NY	ESPN2	W 45–28	29,044
November 2	12:00 p.m.	Air Force*	No. 21	Michie Stadium; West Point, NY (Commander-in-Chief's Trophy)	CBS	W 20–3	30,046
November 9	3:30 p.m.	at North Texas	No. 25	DATCU Stadium; Denton, TX	ESPN2	W 14–3	28,519
November 23	7:00 p.m.	vs. No. 6 Notre Dame*	No. 19	Yankee Stadium; Bronx, NY (Shamrock Series, rivalry)	NBC	L 14–49	47,342
November 30	12:00 p.m.	UTSA		Michie Stadium; West Point, NY	CBSSN	W 29–24	22,120
December 6	8:00 p.m.	Tulane	No. 24	Michie Stadium; West Point, NY (AAC Championship Game)	ABC	W 35–14	14,016
December 14	3:00 p.m.	vs. Navy*	No. 22	Northwest Stadium; Landover, MD (Army–Navy Game, Commander-in-Chief's Trophy)	CBS	L 13–31	60,726
December 28	9:15 p.m.	vs. Louisiana Tech*	No. 22	Independence Stadium; Shreveport, LA (Independence Bowl)	ESPN	W 27–6	34,283
*Non-conference game; Rankings from AP Poll (and CFP Rankings, after November 5) - Released prior to game; All times are in Eastern time

== Rankings ==
Ranking movements Legend: ██ Increase in ranking ██ Decrease in ranking — = Not ranked RV = Received votes
	Week																
Poll	Pre	1	2	3	4	5	6	7	8	9	10	11	12	13	14	15	Final
AP	—	—	—	—	—	RV	RV	23	23	21	18	16	18	25	24	19	21
Coaches	—	—	—	—	—	RV	RV	24	23	21	19	17	17	22	23	18	21
CFP	Not released										25	24	19	—	24	22	Not released

== Game summaries ==
=== Lehigh (FCS) ===
Lehigh Mountain Hawks (FCS) (0–0) at Army Black Knights (0–0) – Game summary

Quarter	1	2	3	4	Total
Mountain Hawks (FCS)	7	0	0	0	7
Black Knights	7	14	7	14	42

at Michie Stadium • West Point, New York

- Date: August 30
- Game time: 6:00 p.m. EDT
- Game weather: Clear • Temperature: 69 °F (21 °C) • Wind: N at 2 miles per hour (3.2 km/h)
- Game attendance: 23,760
- Referee: Dan Scanlan
- TV announcers (CBSSN): Dave Ryan (play-by-play), Adam Breneman (analyst), and Tina Cervasio (sideline reporter)
- Box score

Game information

First quarter

- (5:57) ARMY – Bryson Daily 1 yard run, Trey Gronotte kick (Drive: 9 plays, 80 yards, 4:55; Army 7–0)
- (0:43) LEH – Luke Yoder 18 yard run, Nick Garrido kick (Drive: 9 plays, 75 yards, 5:14; Tied 7–7)

Second quarter

- (10:21) ARMY – Bryson Daily 1 yard run, Trey Gronotte kick (Drive: 13 plays, 76 yards, 5:17; Army 14–7)
- (2:59) ARMY – Kanye Udoh 13 yard run, Trey Gronotte kick (Drive: 10 plays, 79 yards, 6:15; Army 21–7)

Third quarter

- (8:32) ARMY – Noah Short 3 yard run, Trey Gronotte kick (Drive: 10 plays, 77 yards, 6:20; Army 28–7)

Fourth quarter

- (8:28) ARMY – Kanye Udoh 1 yard run, Trey Gronotte kick (Drive: 12 plays, 80 yards, 6:51; Army 35–7)
- (0:19) ARMY – Jake Rendina 3 yard run, Trey Gronotte kick (Drive: 8 plays, 56 yards, 2:50; Army 42–7)

Statistics	LEH	ARMY
First downs	16	26
Total yards	52–282	64–432
Rushing yards	33–172	56–375
Passing yards	110	57
Passing: Comp–Att–Int	10–19–2	5–8–0
Time of possession	26:56	33:04

Team	Category	Player	Statistics
Lehigh	Passing	Dante Perri	6/11, 64 yards
Lehigh	Rushing	Luke Yoder	10 carries, 51 yards, 1 TD
Lehigh	Receiving	Mason Humphrey	5 receptions, 61 yards
Army	Passing	Bryson Daily	3/6, 35 yards
Army	Rushing	Noah Short	8 carries, 83 yards, 1 TD
Army	Receiving	Casey Reynolds	1 reception, 22 yards

=== at Florida Atlantic ===
Army Black Knights (1–0) at Florida Atlantic Owls (0–1) – Game summary

Quarter	1	2	3	4	Total
Black Knights	14	0	3	7	24
Owls	0	7	0	0	7

at FAU Stadium • Boca Raton, Florida

- Date: September 7
- Game time: 12:00 p.m. EDT
- Game weather: Sunny • Temperature: 91 °F (33 °C) • Wind: SE at 11 miles per hour (18 km/h)
- Game attendance: 21,810
- Referee: Tim Rich
- TV announcers (CBSSN): Jordan Kent (play-by-play) and Logan Ryan (analyst)

Game information

First quarter

- (8:38) ARMY – Kanye Udoh 8 yard run, Trey Gronotte kick (Drive: 8 plays, 82 yards, 4:57; Army 7–0)
- (0:47) ARMY – Casey Reynolds 44 yard pass from Bryson Daily, Trey Gronotte kick (Drive: 3 plays, 64 yards, 1:39; Army 14–0)

Second quarter

- (0:53) FAU – Omari Hayes 8 yard pass from Cam Fancher, Morgan Suarez kick (Drive: 9 plays, 68 yards, 2:44; Army 14–7)

Third quarter

- (11:00) ARMY – Trey Gronotte 35 yard field goal (Drive: 6 plays, 57 yards, 4:00; Army 17–7)

Fourth quarter

- (13:57) ARMY – Matthew Rhodes 23 yard run, Trey Gronotte kick (Drive: 15 plays, 96 yards, 10:33; Army 24–7)

Statistics	ARMY	FAU
First downs	21	16
Plays–yards	62–449	53–235
Rushes–yards	58–405	16–42
Passing yards	44	193
Passing: Comp–Att–Int	1–4–0	25–37–1
Time of possession	38:39	21:21

Team	Category	Player	Statistics
Army	Passing	Bryson Daily	1/4, 44 yards, 1 TD
Army	Rushing	Noah Short	11 carries, 160 yards
Army	Receiving	Casey Reynolds	1 reception, 44 yards, 1 TD
Florida Atlantic	Passing	Cam Fancher	25/37, 193 yards, 1 TD, 1 INT
Florida Atlantic	Rushing	CJ Campbell Jr.	8 carries, 20 yards
Florida Atlantic	Receiving	Omari Hayes	4 carries, 45 yards, 1 TD

=== Rice ===
Rice Owls (1–2) at Army Black Knights (2–0) – Game summary

Quarter	1	2	3	4	Total
Owls	0	0	7	7	14
Black Knights	7	21	9	0	37

at Michie Stadium • West Point, New York

- Date: September 21
- Game time: 12:00 p.m. EDT
- Game weather: Sunny • Temperature: 72 °F (22 °C) • Wind: NE at 5 miles per hour (8.0 km/h)
- Game attendance: 26,654
- Referee: Steven Anderson
- TV announcers (CBSSN): Dave Ryan (play-by-play), Adam Breneman (analyst), and Tina Cervasio (sideline reporter)

Game information

First quarter

- (12:08) ARMY – Noah Short 41 yard pass from Bryson Daily, Trey Gronotte kick (Drive: 5 plays, 70 yards, 2:52; Army 7–0)

Second quarter

- (14:20) ARMY – Bryson Daily 7 yard run, Trey Gronotte kick (Drive: 17 plays, 90 yards, 10:52; Army 14–0)
- (1:56) ARMY – Bryson Daily 2 yard run, Trey Gronotte kick (Drive: 9 plays, 57 yards, 5:33; Army 21–0)
- (0:28) ARMY – Casey Reynolds 17 yard pass from Bryson Daily, Trey Gronotte kick (Drive: 7 plays, 50 yards, 1:16; Army 28–0)

Third quarter

- (13:09) ARMY – Team safety (Army 30–0)
- (5:55) RICE – Matt Sykes 16 yard pass from E.J. Warner, Enock Gota kick (Drive: 7 plays, 38 yards, 3:33; Army 30–7)
- (0:02) ARMY – Bryson Daily 1 yard run, Trey Gronotte kick (Drive: 9 plays, 75 yards, 5:53; Army 37–7)

Fourth quarter

- (14:20) RICE – Christian Francisco 5 yard pass from E.J. Warner, Enock Gota kick (Drive: 13 plays, 70 yards, 3:07; Army 37–14)

Statistics	RICE	ARMY
First downs	18	21
Plays–yards	57–297	69–408
Rushes–yards	13–41	56–288
Passing yards	256	120
Passing: Comp–Att–Int	29–44–2	9–13–0
Time of possession	20:55	39:05

Team	Category	Player	Statistics
Rice	Passing	E.J. Warner	28/43, 235 yards, 2 TD, 2 INT
Rice	Rushing	Dean Connors	9 carries, 51 yards
Rice	Receiving	Matt Sykes	6 receptions, 82 yards, 1 TD
Army	Passing	Bryson Daily	6/9, 107 yards, 2 TD
Army	Rushing	Bryson Daily	23 carries, 145 yards, 3 TD
Army	Receiving	Noah Short	2 receptions, 47 yards, 1 TD

=== at Temple ===
Army Black Knights (3–0) at Temple Owls (1–3) – Game summary

Quarter	1	2	3	4	Total
Black Knights	7	7	14	14	42
Owls	0	0	6	8	14

at Lincoln Financial Field • Philadelphia, Pennsylvania

- Date: September 26
- Game time: 7:30 p.m. EDT
- Game weather: Cloudy • Temperature: 77 °F (25 °C) • Wind: S at 5 miles per hour (8.0 km/h)
- Game attendance: 13,255
- Referee: Charles Lamertina
- TV announcers (ESPN): Matt Barrie (play-by-play), Dan Mullen (analyst), and Harry Lyles Jr. (sideline reporter)

Game information

First quarter

- (9:48) ARM – Noah Short 61-yard run, Trey Gronotte kick (Drive: 3 plays, 86 yards, 1:32; Army 7–0)

Second quarter

- (11:50) ARM – Bryson Daily 8-yard run, Trey Gronotte kick (Drive: 13 plays, 89 yards, 8:29; Army 14–0)

Third quarter

- (10:50) ARM – Bryson Daily 9-yard run, Trey Gronotte kick (Drive: 7 plays, 75 yards, 4:10; Army 21–0)
- (5:22) ARM – Kanye Udoh 28-yard run, Trey Gronotte kick (Drive: 6 plays, 52 yards, 3:44; Army 28–0)
- (1:10) TEM – Dante Wright 29-yard pass from Evan Simon (Drive: 7 plays, 75 yards, 4:12; Army 28–6)

Fourth quarter

- (11:19) TEM – Daniel Evert 54-yard pass from Evan Simon, Antonio Jones pass (Drive: 6 plays, 65 yards, 2:23; Army 28–14)
- (7:36) ARM – Bryson Daily 12-yard run, Trey Gronotte kick (Drive: 6 plays, 75 yards, 3:43; Army 35–14)
- (1:54) ARM – Cam Schurr 18-yard pass from Dewayne Coleman, Trey Gronotte kick (Drive: 8 plays, 46 yards, 4:25; Army 42–14)

Statistics	ARMY	TEM
First downs	23	12
Plays–yards	63–489	52–219
Rushes–yards	57–417	22–-5
Passing yards	72	224
Passing: Comp–Att–Int	3–6–0	19–30–1
Time of possession	35:14	24:40

Team	Category	Player	Statistics
Army	Passing	Bryson Daily	2/5, 54 yards
Army	Rushing	Bryson Daily	24 carries, 152 yards, 3 TD
Army	Receiving	Noah Short	1 reception, 27 yards
Temple	Passing	Evan Simon	19/30, 224 yards, 2 TD, INT
Temple	Rushing	Joquez Smith	4 carries, 8 yards
Temple	Receiving	Dante Wright	8 receptions, 98 yards, TD

=== at Tulsa ===
Army Black Knights (4–0) at Tulsa Golden Hurricane (2–3) – Game summary

Quarter	1	2	3	4	Total
Black Knights	7	14	21	7	49
Golden Hurricane	7	0	0	0	7

at H. A. Chapman Stadium • Tulsa, Oklahoma

- Date: October 5
- Game time: 12:00 p.m. EDT
- Game weather: Sunny • Temperature: 79 °F (26 °C) • Wind: S at 10 miles per hour (16 km/h)
- Game attendance: 24,409
- Referee: Darryl DeBerry
- TV announcers (ESPNU): Courtney Lyle (play-by-play) and Rene Ingoglia (analyst)

Game information

First quarter

- (10:30) ARMY – Noah Short 37-yard pass from Bryson Daily, Trey Gronotte kick (Drive: 3 plays, 42 yards, 1:28; Army 7–0)
- (3:14) TLSA – Cooper Legas 1-yard run, Seth Morgan kick (Drive: 16 plays, 75 yards, 7:12; Tied 7–7)

Second quarter

- (5:02) ARMY – Bryson Daily 4-yard run, Trey Gronotte kick (Drive: 6 plays, 70 yards, 3:26; Army 14–7)
- (1:49) ARMY – Noah Short 58-yard pass from Bryson Daily, Trey Gronotte kick (Drive: 4 plays, 68 yards, 1:41; Army 21–7)

Third quarter

- (13:33) ARMY – Kanye Udoh 61-yard run, Trey Gronotte kick (Drive: 3 plays, 75 yards, 1:27; Army 28–7)
- (6:44) ARMY – Kanye Udoh 63-yard run, Trey Gronotte kick (Drive: 2 plays, 72 yards, 0:50; Army 35–7)
- (0:14) ARMY – Bryson Daily 27-yard run, Trey Gronotte kick (Drive: 8 plays, 53 yards, 4:53; Army 42–7)

Fourth quarter

- (7:40) ARMY – Dewayne Coleman 4-yard run, Trey Gronotte kick (Drive: 12 plays, 69 yards, 6:39; Army 49–7)

Statistics	ARMY	TLSA
First downs	18	17
Plays–yards	46–481	72–268
Rushes–yards	40–321	42–159
Passing yards	160	109
Passing: Comp–Att–Int	6–6–0	21–30–0
Time of possession	25:31	34:29

Team	Category	Player	Statistics
Army	Passing	Bryson Daily	5/5, 140 yards, 2 TD
Army	Rushing	Kanye Udoh	6 carries, 137 yards, 2 TD
Army	Receiving	Noah Short	3 receptions, 121 yards, 2 TD
Tulsa	Passing	Kirk Francis	16/22, 84 yards
Tulsa	Rushing	Cooper Legas	17 carries, 81 yards, TD
Tulsa	Receiving	Kamdyn Benjamin	7 receptions, 44 yards

=== UAB ===
UAB Blazers (1–4) at Army Black Knights (5–0) – Game summary

Quarter	1	2	3	4	Total
Blazers	3	0	0	7	10
Black Knights	20	14	7	3	44

at Michie Stadium • West Point, New York

- Date: October 12
- Game time: 12:00 p.m. EDT
- Game weather: Sunny
- Game attendance: 29,002
- Referee: Reid Jackson
- TV announcers (CBSSN): Dave Ryan (play-by-play), Adam Breneman (analyst), and Tina Cervasio (sideline reporter)

Game information

First quarter

- (13:38) ARMY – Bryson Daily 29-yard run, Trey Gronotte kick (Drive: 1 play, 34 yards, 0:10; Army 7–0)
- (9:47) UAB – Jonah Delange 51-yard field goal (Drive: 11 plays, 42 yards, 3:51; Army 7–3)
- (5:00) ARMY – Bryson Daily 9-yard run (Drive: 8 plays, 65 yards, 4:47; Army 13–3)
- (2:45) ARMY – Bryson Daily 13-yard run, Trey Gronotte kick (Drive: 3 plays, 37 yards, 1:27; Army 20–3)

Second quarter

- (9:42) ARMY – Kanye Udoh 12-yard run, Trey Gronotte kick (Drive: 10 plays, 73 yards, 6:35; Army 27–3)
- (3:23) ARMY – Casey Reynolds 50-yard pass from Bryson Daily, Trey Gronotte kick (Drive: 4 plays, 95 yards, 2:18; Army 34–3)

Third quarter

- (7:34) ARMY – Bryson Daily 6-yard run, Dawson Jones kick (Drive: 12 plays, 75 yards, 7:26; Army 41–3)

Fourth quarter

- (14:55) ARMY – Trey Gronotte 23-yard field goal (Drive: 11 plays, 50 yards, 6:21; Army 44–3)
- (2:01) UAB – Amare Thomas 8-yard pass from Jalen Kitna, Jonah Delange kick (Drive: 17 plays, 90 yards, 6:43; Army 44–10)

Statistics	UAB	ARMY
First downs	18	28
Plays–yards	63–303	64–515
Rushes–yards	24–61	56–413
Passing yards	242	102
Passing: Comp–Att–Int	25–39–2	3–8–0
Time of possession	24:54	35:06

Team	Category	Player	Statistics
UAB	Passing	Jalen Kitna	25/39, 242 yards, TD, 2 INT
UAB	Rushing	Lee Beebe Jr.	9 carries, 36 yards
UAB	Receiving	Kam Shanks	9 receptions, 119 yards
Army	Passing	Bryson Daily	3/7, 102 yards, TD
Army	Rushing	Bryson Daily	12 carries, 136 yards, 4 TD
Army	Receiving	Casey Reynolds	2 receptions, 84 yards, TD

=== East Carolina ===
East Carolina Pirates (3–3) at No. 23 Army Black Knights (6–0) – Game summary

Quarter	1	2	3	4	Total
Pirates	0	0	7	21	28
No. 23 Black Knights	7	17	14	7	45

at Michie Stadium • West Point, New York

- Date: October 19
- Game time: 12:00 p.m. EDT
- Game weather: Sunny • Temperature: 61 °F (16 °C) • Wind: NW at 4 miles per hour (6.4 km/h)
- Game attendance: 29,044
- Referee: Henry Johns
- TV announcers (ESPN2): Roy Philpott (play-by-play), Sam Acho (analyst), and Taylor Davis (sideline reporter)

Game information

First quarter

- (10:32) ARMY – Miles Stewart 13-yard pass from Bryson Daily, Trey Gronotte kick (Drive: 5 plays, 66 yards, 3:27; Army 7–0)

Second quarter

- (14:56) ARMY – Trey Gronotte 32-yard field goal (Drive: 14 plays, 64 yards, 8:38; Army 10–0)
- (9:10) ARMY – Bryson Daily 17-yard run, Trey Gronotte kick (Drive: 8 plays, 48 yards, 4:24; Army 17–0)
- (7:19) ARMY – Bryson Daily 21-yard run, Trey Gronotte kick (Drive: 1 play, 31 yards, 0:08; Army 24–0)

Third quarter

- (9:12) ARMY – Bryson Daily 1-yard run, Trey Gronotte kick (Drive: 11 plays, 75 yards, 5:48; Army 31–0)
- (7:20) ECU – Chase Sowell 53-yard pass from Katin Houser, Noah Perez kick (Drive: 5 plays, 77 yards, 1:46; Army 31–7)
- (3:10) ARMY – Bryson Daily 3-yard run, Trey Gronotte kick (Drive: 7 plays, 75 yards, 4:10; Army 38–7)

Fourth quarter

- (9:47) ECU – Katin Houser 1-yard run, Noah Perez kick (Drive: 10 plays, 75 yards, 4:51; Army 38–14)
- (6:30) ECU – Anthony Smith 11-yard pass from Katin Houser (Drive: 6 plays, 35 yards, 1:05; Army 38–20)
- (4:43) ARMY – Bryson Daily 4-yard run, Trey Gronotte kick (Drive: 3 plays, 44 yards, 1:42; Army 45–20)
- (2:39) ECU – Winston Wright Jr. 12-yard pass from Katin Houser, Chase Sowell pass (Drive: 7 plays, 75 yards, 2:04; Army 45–28)

Statistics	ECU	ARMY
First downs	20	22
Plays–yards	58–369	66–442
Rushes–yards	20–87	56–295
Passing yards	282	147
Passing: Comp–Att–Int	24–38–1	7–10–0
Time of possession	22:40	37:20

Team	Category	Player	Statistics
East Carolina	Passing	Katin Houser	24/38, 282 yards, 3 TD, INT
East Carolina	Rushing	Rahjai Harris	9 carries, 34 yards
East Carolina	Receiving	Chase Sowell	7 receptions, 138 yards, TD
Army	Passing	Bryson Daily	7/10, 147 yards, TD
Army	Rushing	Bryson Daily	31 carries, 171 yards, 5 TD
Army	Receiving	Casey Reynolds	3 receptions, 85 yards

=== Air Force ===
Air Force Falcons (1–6) at No. 21 Army Black Knights (7–0) – Game summary

Quarter	1	2	3	4	Total
Falcons	0	3	0	0	3
No. 21 Black Knights	3	3	7	7	20

at Michie Stadium • West Point, New York

- Date: November 2
- Game time: 12:00 p.m. EDT
- Game weather: Sunny • Temperature: 56 °F (13 °C) • Wind: NW 8 miles per hour (13 km/h)
- Game attendance: 30,046
- Referee: Cal McNeill
- TV announcers (CBS): Rich Waltz (play-by-play), Ross Tucker (analyst), and Tiffany Blackmon (sideline reporter)

Game information

First quarter

- (6:35) ARMY – Trey Gronotte 30-yard field goal (Drive: 11 plays, 57 yards, 6:13; Army 3–0)

Second quarter

- (12:37) ARMY – Trey Gronotte 32-yard field goal (Drive: 8 plays, 29 yards, 3:51; Army 6–0)
- (1:47) AFA – Matthew Dapore 32-yard field goal (Drive: 11 plays, 49 yards, 5:13; Army 6–3)

Third quarter

- (9:59) ARMY – Kanye Udoh 12-yard run, Trey Gronotte kick (Drive: 9 plays, 65 yards, 5:01; Army 13–3)

Fourth quarter

- (1:46) ARMY – Kanye Udoh 25-yard run, Trey Gronotte kick (Drive: 1 play, 25 yards, 0:05; Army 20–3)

Statistics	AFA	ARMY
First downs	15	14
Plays–yards	60–209	52–255
Rushes–yards	40–117	43–207
Passing yards	92	48
Passing: Comp–Att–Int	10–20–3	5–9–0
Time of possession	31:51	28:09

Team	Category	Player	Statistics
Air Force	Passing	Quentin Hayes	7/14, 54 yards, INT
Air Force	Rushing	Quentin Hayes	22 carries, 61 yards
Air Force	Receiving	Cade Harris	5 receptions, 52 yards
Army	Passing	Dewayne Coleman	5/8, 48 yards
Army	Rushing	Kanye Udoh	22 carries, 158 yards, 2 TD
Army	Receiving	Casey Reynolds	1 reception, 24 yards

=== at North Texas ===
No. 25 Army Black Knights (8–0) at North Texas Mean Green (5–3) – Game summary

Quarter	1	2	3	4	Total
No. 25 Black Knights	7	0	0	7	14
Mean Green	3	0	0	0	3

at DATCU Stadium • Denton, Texas

- Date: November 9
- Game time: 3:30 p.m. EST
- Game weather: Sunny • Temperature: 70 °F (21 °C) • Wind: W 4 miles per hour (6.4 km/h)
- Game attendance: 28,519
- Referee: Edwin Lee
- TV announcers (ESPN2): Mike Monaco (play-by-play), Kirk Morrison (analyst), and Dawn Davenport (sideline reporter)

Game information

First quarter

- (8:10) UNT – Kali Nguma 31-yard field goal (Drive: 18 plays, 62 yards, 6:50; North Texas 3–0)
- (2:22) ARMY – Bryson Daily 10-yard run, Trey Gronotte kick (Drive: 9 plays, 48 yards, 5:47; Army 7–3)

Second quarter

No scoring plays

Third quarter

No scoring plays

Fourth quarter

- (11:44) ARMY – Bryson Daily 2-yard run, Trey Gronotte kick (Drive: 21 plays, 94 yards, 13:46; Army 14–3)

Statistics	ARMY	UNT
First downs	23	18
Plays–yards	68–308	55–283
Rushes–yards	64–293	18–69
Passing yards	15	214
Passing: Comp–Att–Int	2–4–1	24–37–2
Time of possession	41:37	18:15

Team	Category	Player	Statistics
Army	Passing	Bryson Daily	2/4, 15 yards, INT
Army	Rushing	Bryson Daily	36 carries, 153 yards, 2 TD
Army	Receiving	Josh Horton	1 reception, 8 yards
North Texas	Passing	Chandler Morris	24/37, 214 yards, 2 INT
North Texas	Rushing	Shane Porter	6 carries, 33 yards
North Texas	Receiving	Damon Ward Jr.	4 receptions, 63 yards

=== vs. No. 6 Notre Dame (rivalry) ===
No. 19 Army Black Knights (9–0) vs No. 6 Notre Dame Fighting Irish (9–1) – Game summary

Quarter	1	2	3	4	Total
No. 19 Black Knights	0	7	0	7	14
No. 6 Fighting Irish	14	14	14	7	49

at Yankee Stadium • Bronx, New York

- Date: November 23
- Game time: 7:00 p.m. EST
- Game weather: Temperature: 45 °F (7 °C) • Wind: W 10 MPH • Weather: Cloudy
- Game attendance: 47,352
- Referee: Mike Roche
- TV announcers (NBC/Peacock): Noah Eagle (play-by-play), Todd Blackledge (analyst), and Kathryn Tappen (sideline reporter)

Game information

First quarter

- (10:24) ND – Jordan Faison 28-yard run, Mitch Jeter kick (Drive: 5 plays, 68 yards, 2:17; Notre Dame 7–0)
- (6:30) ND – Jeremiyah Love 6-yard pass from Reily Leonard, Mitch Jeter kick (Drive: 3 plays, 7 yards, 1:38; Notre Dame 14–0)

Second quarter

- (13:53) ARMY – Bryson Daily 4-yard run, Trey Gronotte kick (Drive: 12 plays, 75 yards, 7:37; Notre Dame 14–7)
- (4:35) ND – Jeremiyah Love 14-yard run, Mitch Jeter kick (Drive: 3 plays, 41 yards, 1:23; Notre Dame 21–7)
- (0:26) ND – Jadarian Price 2-yard run, Mitch Jeter kick (Drive: 8 plays, 50 yards, 2:14; Notre Dame 28–7)

Third quarter

- (14:44) ND – Jeremiyah Love 68-yard run, Mitch Jeter kick (Drive: 1 play, 68 yards, 0:10; Notre Dame 35–7)
- (0:45) ND – Jadarian Price 10-yard run, Mitch Jeter kick (Drive: 8 plays, 57 yards, 3:33; Notre Dame 42–7)

Fourth quarter

- (10:40) ND – Aneyas Williams 58-yard run, Mitch Jeter kick (Drive: 1 play, 58 yards, 0:12; Notre Dame 49–7)
- (0:22) ARMY – Bryson Daily 1-yard run, Trey Gronotte kick (Drive: 17 plays, 75 yards, 10:18; Notre Dame 49–14)

Statistics	ARMY	ND
First downs	15	20
Plays–yards	67–233	47–462
Rushes–yards	58–207	29–273
Passing yards	26	189
Passing: Comp–Att–Int	4–9–0	14–18–0
Time of possession	39:49	20:11

Team	Category	Player	Statistics
Army	Passing	Bryson Daily	4/8, 26 yards
Army	Rushing	Bryson Daily	39 carries, 139 yards, 2 TD
Army	Receiving	Casey Reynolds	1 reception, 11 yards
Notre Dame	Passing	Riley Leonard	10/13, 148 yards, 2 TD
Notre Dame	Rushing	Jeremiyah Love	7 carries, 130 yards, 2 TD
Notre Dame	Receiving	Jordan Faison	2 receptions, 46 yards, TD

=== UTSA ===
UTSA Roadrunners (6–5) at Army Black Knights (9–1) – Game summary

Quarter	1	2	3	4	Total
Roadrunners	7	3	7	7	24
Black Knights	7	6	3	13	29

at Michie Stadium • West Point, New York

- Date: November 30
- Game time: 12:00 p.m. EST
- Game weather: Temperature: 36 °F (2 °C) • Wind: West at 10 miles per hour (16 km/h) • Weather: Clear
- Game attendance: 22,120
- Referee: Charles Lamertina
- TV announcers (CBSSN): Dave Ryan (play-by-play), Adam Breneman (analyst), and Tina Cervasio (sideline reporter)

Game information

First quarter

- (7:23) ARMY – Tyrell Robinson 41-yard pass from Bryson Daily, Trey Gronotte kick (Drive: 13 plays, 75 yards, 7:37; Army 7–0)
- (4:45) UTSA – Brandon High Jr. 10-yard run, Tate Sandell kick (Drive: 7 plays, 53 yards, 2:32; Tied 7–7)

Second quarter

- (5:17) ARMY – Trey Gronotte 39-yard field goal (Drive: 8 plays, 44 yards, 3:05; Army 10–7)
- (1:39) UTSA – Tate Sandell 33-yard field goal (Drive: 12 plays, 58 yards, 3:30; Tied 10–10)
- (0:00) ARMY – Trey Gronotte 35-yard field goal (Drive: 5 plays, 29 yards, 0:15; Army 13–10)

Third quarter

- (10:13) UTSA – Devin McCuin 23-yard pass from Owen McCown, Tate Sandell kick (Drive: 11 plays, 75 yards, 4:47; UTSA 17–13)
- (1:34) ARMY – Trey Gronotte 22-yard field goal (Drive: 14 plays, 70 yards, 8:39; UTSA 17–16)

Fourth quarter

- (12:19) ARMY – Bryson Daily 1-yard run, 2-point conversion failed (Drive: 5 plays, 16 yards, 2:37; Army 22–17)
- (10:26) ARMY – Bryson Daily 42-yard run, Trey Gronotte kick (Drive: 2 plays, 46 yards, 0:51; Army 29–17)
- (9:10) UTSA – Brandon High Jr. 6-yard run, Tate Sandell kick (Drive: 4 plays, 75 yards, 1:16; Army 29–24)

Statistics	UTSA	ARMY
First downs	16	22
Plays–yards	54–324	77–407
Rushes–yards	26–117	60–217
Passing yards	207	190
Passing: Comp–Att–Int	17–28–2	10–17–0
Time of possession	19:34	40:26

Team	Category	Player	Statistics
UTSA	Passing	Owen McCown	17/28, 207 yards, TD, 2 INT
UTSA	Rushing	Brandon High Jr.	16 carries, 61 yards, 2 TD
UTSA	Receiving	Devin McCuin	3 receptions, 82 yards, TD
Army	Passing	Bryson Daily	10/17, 190 yards, TD
Army	Rushing	Bryson Daily	27 carries, 147 yards, 2 TD
Army	Receiving	Casey Reynolds	4 receptions, 81 yards

=== Tulane (AAC Championship) ===
Tulane Green Wave (9–3) at No. 24 Army Black Knights (10–1) – Game summary

Quarter	1	2	3	4	Total
Green Wave	0	7	0	7	14
No. 24 Black Knights	7	14	7	7	35

at Michie Stadium • West Point, NY

- Date: December 6
- Game time: 7:00 p.m. EST
- Game weather: Temperature: 27 °F (−3 °C) • Wind: W at 7 miles per hour (11 km/h) • Weather: Fair
- Game attendance: 14,016
- Referee: Tim Rich
- TV announcers (ABC): Dave Pasch (play-by-play), Dusty Dvoracek, (color analyst) and Taylor McGregor (sideline reporter)

Game information

First quarter

- (3:48) ARMY – Bryson Daily 5-yard run, Trey Gronotte kick (Drive: 11 plays, 72 yards, 6:36; Army 7–0)

Second quarter

- (10:18) ARMY – Bryson Daily 3-yard run, Trey Gronotte kick (Drive: 3 plays, 80 yards, 1:26; Army 14–0)
- (1:40) ARMY – Bryson Daily 4-yard run, Trey Gronotte kick (Drive: 5 plays, 21 yards, 1:00; Army 21–0)
- (0:44) TULN – Mario Williams 42-yard pass from Darian Mensah, Patrick Durkin kick (Drive: 4 plays, 60 yards, 0:52; Army 21–7)

Third quarter

- (8:29) UTSA – Bryson Daily 7-yard run, Trey Gronotte kick (Drive: 11 plays, 75 yards, 6:31; Army 28–7)

Fourth quarter

- (6:29) ARMY – Kanye Udoh 1-yard run, Trey Gronotte kick (Drive: 16 plays, 84 yards, 10:44; Army 35–7)
- (1:10) TULN – Alex Bauman 2-yard pass from Darian Mensah, Patrick Durkin kick (Drive: 16 plays, 80 yards, 5:13; Army 35–14)

Statistics	TULN	ARMY
First downs	17	20
Plays–yards	55–324	59–352
Rushes–yards	29–115	57–335
Passing yards	209	17
Passing: Comp–Att–Int	17–25–1	2–2–0
Time of possession	25:40	34:20

Team	Category	Player	Statistics
Tulane	Passing	Darian Mensah	17/25, 209 yards, 2 TD, INT
Tulane	Rushing	Makhi Hughes	14 carries, 66 yards
Tulane	Receiving	Mario Williams	6 receptions, 109 yards, TD
Army	Passing	Bryson Daily	2/2, 17 yards
Army	Rushing	Kanye Udoh	20 carries, 158 yards, TD
Army	Receiving	Casey Reynolds	1 reception, 9 yards

=== vs. Navy (Army–Navy Game) ===
Navy Midshipmen (8–3) vs No. 22 Army Black Knights (11–1) - (125th Army-Navy Game) – Game summary

Quarter	1	2	3	4	Total
Midshipmen	7	7	7	10	31
No. 22 Black Knights	0	7	3	3	13

at Northwest Stadium • Landover, Maryland

- Date: December 14
- Game time: 3:00 p.m. EST
- Game weather: Temperature: 38 °F (3 °C) • Wind: E at 6 miles per hour (9.7 km/h) • Weather: Sunny
- Game attendance: 60,726
- Referee: Kevin Randall
- TV announcers (CBS): Brad Nessler (play-by-play), Gary Danielson (analyst), Jenny Dell (sideline reporter)

Game information

First quarter

- (8:56) NAVY – Blake Horvath 1-yard run, Nathan Kirkwood kick (Drive: 12 plays, 65 yards, 6:04; Navy 7–0)

Second quarter

- (11:30) NAVY – Brandon Chatman 18-yard pass from Blake Horvath, Nathan Kirkwood kick (Drive: 3 plays, 44 yards, 1:15; Navy 14–0)
- (6:29) ARMY – Hayden Reed 23-yard pass from Bryson Daily, Trey Gronotte kick (Drive: 8 plays, 65 yards, 5:01; Navy 14–7)

Third quarter

- (8:15) ARMY – Trey Gronotte 39-yard field goal (Drive: 11 plays, 47 yards, 6:40; Navy 14–10)
- (6:34) NAVY – Eli Heidenreich 52-yard pass from Blake Horvath, Nathan Kirkwood kick (Drive: 3 plays, 58 yards, 1:33; Navy 21–10)

Fourth quarter

- (14:44) ARMY – Trey Gronotte 31-yard field goal (Drive: 13 plays, 45 yards, 6:43; Navy 21–13)
- (8:50) NAVY – Blake Horvath 1-yard run, Nathan Kirkwood kick (Drive: 10 plays, 75 yards, 5:49; Navy 28–13)
- (3:45) NAVY – Nathan Kirkwood 27-yard field goal (Drive: 6 plays, 57 yards, 3:39; Navy 31–13)

Statistics	NAVY	ARMY
First downs	15	13
Plays–yards	55–378	55–178
Rushes–yards	46–271	39–113
Passing yards	107	65
Passing: Comp–Att–Int	4–9–0	7–16–3
Time of possession	29:40	30:20

Team	Category	Player	Statistics
Navy	Passing	Blake Horvath	4/9, 107 yards, 2 TD
Navy	Rushing	Blake Horvath	24 carries, 196 yards, 2 TD
Navy	Receiving	Eli Heidenreich	1 reception, 52 yards, TD
Army	Passing	Bryson Daily	7/16, 65 yards, TD, 3 INT
Army	Rushing	Kanye Udoh	14 carries, 53 yards
Army	Receiving	Hayden Reed	3 receptions, 29 yards, TD

This year's Army uniform honors the storied legacy of the 101st Airborne Division known as the Screaming Eagles. They lived their motto, "Rendezvous with Destiny", when they marched into the town of Bastogne in response to the Nazi offensive that would become known as the Battle of the Bulge. Encircled by Nazi forces, they endured three weeks of relentless close combat in freezing weather and deep snow. The black with snow-topped shoulders uniform reflects "the canopy of fog and snow giving way to the shadows beneath the snow-covered pine forest in the Ardennes."

The typography on the back of the uniforms is a version of Anthony McAuliffe's, the acting 101st Airborne Division's commander, reply of "Nuts!" or "Go to Hell!" to the Nazi commander asking his squad to surrender.

A star patch on the jersey is "The Invasion Star", which was used on American aircraft and vehicles to help to ID soldiers on the battlefield. The seven gaps on the patch represent the seven roads at Bastogne. The patch on the left sleeve is the patch of the 101st Airborne, while the patch on the right sleeve is the American flag that was worn on the jumpsuit of the 101st paratroopers.

Black Helmets include a parachute logo and "Screaming Eagles" on the front. Players will be randomly assigned one of four card suit helmets: "clubs" (327th Glider Infantry Regiment), "diamonds" (501st Paratroopers Infantry Regiment), "heart" (502nd PIR), and "spades" (506th PIR) with each card suit representing a symbol for the 101st paratroopers and glider troops to use to identify respective units.

=== vs Louisiana Tech (Independence Bowl) ===
2024 Independence Bowl
Louisiana Tech Bulldogs vs. No. 22 Army Black Knights – Game summary

Quarter	1	2	3	4	Total
Bulldogs	0	3	3	0	6
No. 22 Black Knights	14	7	0	6	27

at Independence Stadium, Shreveport, Louisiana

- Date: December 28
- Game time: 9:15 p.m. EST
- Game weather: Clear Temperature: 54 °F (12 °C) Wind: 12 mph (19 km/h) northeast
- Game attendance: 34,283
- Referee: Jeremy Valentine
- TV announcers (ESPN): Lowell Galindo (play-by-play), Fozzy Whittaker (analyst), and Tori Petry (analyst)
- Box score

Game information
First quarter
- ARMY - Trey Gronotte 15-yard run (Trey Gronotte kick), 9:32. Army 70. Drive: 8 play, 80 yards, 4:05.
- ARMY - Hayden Reed 12-yard run (Trey Gronotte kick), 1:28. Army 140. Drive: 10 play, 80 yards, 5:39.

Second quarter

- LT - Drew Henderson 27-yard field goal, 14:15. Army 143. Drive: 7 plays, 56 yards, 2:13.
- ARMY - Bryson Daily 8-yard run (Trey Gronotte kick), 1:54. Army 213. Drive: 21 plays, 75 yards, 12:21.

Third quarter

- LT - Drew Henderson 44-yard field goal, 2:11. Army 216. Drive: 11 plays, 39 yards, 5:33.

Fourth quarter

- ARMY - Bryson Daily 3-yard run (2-point run conversion failed), 14:56. Army 276. Drive: 5 plays, 75 yard, 2:15.

Statistics	LT	ARMY
First downs	11	26
Total yards	218	386
Rushing yards	49	321
Passing yards	169	65
Turnovers	1	1
Time of possession	19:52	40:08

Team	Category	Player	Statistics
Louisiana Tech	Passing	Evan Bullock	14/28, 169 yards, INT
Louisiana Tech	Rushing	Omiri Wiggins	8 carries, 40 yards
Louisiana Tech	Receiving	Tru Edwards	8 receptions, 92 yards
Army	Passing	Bryson Daily	2/9, 65 yards
Army	Rushing	Bryson Daily	27 carries, 127 yards, 3 TD
Army	Receiving	David Crossan	1 reception, 52 yards

== Coaching staff ==
Army Black Knights
Name	Position	Consecutive season at Army in current position	Previous position
Jeff Monken	Head coach	11th	Georgia Southern head coach (2010–2013)
Cody Worley	Offensive coordinator and quarterbacks coach	1st	Army run game coordinator and quarterbacks coach (2023)
Nate Woody	Defensive coordinator	4th	Michigan defensive analyst (2020)
Sean Saturnio	Special teams coordinator	5th	Army tight ends coach (2018–2019)
John Loose	Assistant head coach and outside linebackers coach	5th	Army defensive coordinator (2019)
Mike Viti	Offensive line coach	3rd	Army running backs coach (2017–2021)
Cheston Blackshear	Tight ends coach	1st	Florida offensive quality control (2022–2023)
Sean Cronin	Defensive line coach	3rd	Colorado State linebackers coach (2020–2021)
Daryl Dixon	Cornerbacks coach	6th	Army outside linebackers coach (2016–2018)
Matt Drinkall	Offensive line coach	1st	Army co-offensive coordinator and offensive line coach (2023)
Blake Powers	Running backs coach	1st	Army tight ends coach (2023)
Aaron Smith	Wide receivers coach	3rd	UConn wide receivers coach (2017–2021)
Drew Thatcher	H-backs coach	1st	Army offensive coordinator (2023)
Danny Verpaele	Safeties coach	2nd	Kennesaw State defensive coordinator and defensive backs coach (2020–2022)
Justin Weaver	Inside linebackers coach	2nd	USMAPS (NY) head coach (2022)
Collin Shank	Defensive quality control	2nd	Army graduate assistant (2022)
Tristan Yeomans	Offensive quality control	2nd	Charlotte special teams assistant (2022)
