= 2026 Rice Owls football team =

American college football season

2026 Rice Owls football
- Conference: American Conference
- Record: 2–9 (1–6 American)
- Head coach: Scott Abell (2nd season)
- Offensive coordinator: Vince Munch (2nd season)
- Offensive scheme: Spread option
- Defensive coordinator: Jon Kay (2nd season)
- Base defense: Multiple 3–4
- Home stadium: First Community Stadium

2026 American Conference football standings
	Conf.			Overall
Team	W		L	W		L
UTSA	6	–	1	9	–	2
Memphis	5	–	2	8	–	3
East Carolina	5	–	2	7	–	4
North Texas	5	–	2	7	–	4
UAB	4	–	3	6	–	5
Army	4	–	3	5	–	5
Tulsa	4	–	3	7	–	4
Florida Atlantic	4	–	3	7	–	4
Tulane	4	–	3	6	–	5
Navy	3	–	4	4	–	6
South Florida	2	–	5	6	–	5
Rice	1	–	6	2	–	9
Charlotte	1	–	6	1	–	10
Temple	1	–	6	2	–	9
Championship: December 5, 2026
As of November 22, 2026; Rankings from AP poll

The 2026 Rice Owls football team will represent Rice University as a member of the American Conference during the 2026 NCAA Division I FBS football season. Led by second-year head coach Scott Abell, the Owls will play their home games at Rice Stadium in Houston, Texas.

== Schedule ==
Date	Time	Opponent	Site	TV	Result	Attendance
September 5	6:00 p.m.	Houston Christian*	Rice Stadium; Houston, TX	ESPN+	W 31–3	15,128
September 12	2:30 p.m.	at No. 3 Notre Dame*	Notre Dame Stadium; Notre Dame, IN	NBC	L 0–52	77,622
September 19	6:00 p.m.	Western Michigan*	Rice Stadium; Houston, TX	ESPN+	L 21–28	14,255
September 26	9:00 p.m.	at Fresno State*	Valley Children's Stadium; Fresno, CA	The CW	L 24–38	39,001
October 3	6:00 p.m.	UTSA	First Community Stadium; Houston, TX	ESPN+	L 14–16	16,739
October 10	12:00 p.m.	at East Carolina	Dowdy–Ficklen Stadium; Greenville, NC	ESPN+	L 12–28	33,968
October 17	3:30 p.m.	Tulsa	First Community Stadium; Houston, TX	ESPN+	L 17–38	14,626
October 24	11:00 a.m.	at Florida Atlantic	Flagler Credit Union Stadium; Boca Raton, FL	ESPNU	L 49–51	14,212
November 7	3:00 p.m.	at North Texas	DATCU Stadium; Denton, TX	ESPNU	L 23–52	23,443
November 14	3:30 p.m.	Tulane^{†}	First Community Stadium; Houston, TX	ESPN+	L 17–20	18,921
November 19	6:30 p.m.	at Temple	Lincoln Financial Field; Philadelphia, PA	ESPN	W 31–27	10,411
November 28	1:00 p.m.	Army	First Community Stadium; Houston, TX	ESPN+		
*Non-conference game; ^{†}Homecoming; Rankings from AP Poll - Released prior to game; All times are in Central time

== Game summaries ==
=== Houston Christian (FCS) ===
Houston Christian Huskies (FCS) (1–0) at Rice Owls (0–0) – Game summary

Quarter	1	2	3	4	Total
Huskies (FCS)	3	0	0	0	3
Owls	7	10	0	14	31

at Rice Stadium • Houston, Texas

- Date: September 5
- Game time: 6:00 p.m. CDT
- Game weather: Cloudy • Temperature: 87 °F (31 °C) • Wind: SE at 7 miles per hour (11 km/h)
- Game attendance: 15,128
- Referee: Austin Mezzacasa
- TV announcers (ESPN+): Chris Elliott and LaDarrin McLane

Game information

First quarter

- HCU – Lukasz Smolen 42-yard field goal, 9:24. Huskies 3–0. Drive: 9 plays, 24 yards, 1:47.
- RICE – D'Andre Hardeman Jr. 2-yard run (Enock Gota kick), 1:02. Owls 7–3. Drive: 15 plays, 71 yards, 8:18.

Second quarter

- RICE – Quinton Jackson 7-yard run (Enock Gota kick), 9:32. Owls 14–3. Drive: 10 plays, 53 yards, 4:34.
- RICE – Enock Gota 26-yard field goal, 2:31. Owls 17–3. Drive: 11 plays, 72 yards, 5:46.

Third quarter

- No scoring plays.

Fourth quarter

- RICE – Quinton Jackson 12-yard run (Enock Gota kick), 13:19. Owls 24–3. Drive: 11 plays, 60 yards, 5:54.
- RICE – Gael Ochoa 29-yard run (Enock Gota kick), 10:16. Owls 31–3. Drive: 3 plays, 44 yards, 1:06.

Statistics	HCU	RICE
First downs	13	27
Plays–yards	58–244	80–493
Rushes–yards	35–148	70–465
Passing yards	96	28
Passing: comp–att–int	8–23–1	4–10–0
Turnovers	1	0
Time of possession	20:28	39:32

Team	Category	Player	Statistics
Houston Christian	Passing	Cutter Stewart	6/17, 61 yards, INT
Houston Christian	Rushing	Champ Dozier	8 carries, 86 yards
Houston Christian	Receiving	Jamaal Hall II	2 receptions, 27 yards
Rice	Passing	Gael Ochoa	2/5, 17 yards
Rice	Rushing	Tyvonn Byars	16 carries, 104 yards
Rice	Receiving	Davis Lane	2 receptions, 11 yards

=== at No. 3 Notre Dame ===
Rice Owls (1–0) at No. 3 Notre Dame Fighting Irish (1–0) – Game summary

Quarter	1	2	3	4	Total
Owls	0	0	0	0	0
No. 3 Fighting Irish	21	21	10	0	52

at Notre Dame Stadium • Notre Dame, Indiana

- Date: September 12
- Game time: 2:30 p.m. CDT
- Game weather: Clear, 82 ºF (28ºC); Wind SW 8 per hour
- Game attendance: 77,622
- Referee: Nate Black
- TV announcers (NBC): Dan Hicks, Jason Garrett and Caroline Pineda

Game information

First quarter

- (14:46) ND – Boubacar Traore 24-yard fumble return (Drive: 2 plays, -1 yards, 0:14; Notre Dame 0–7)
- (10:30) ND – Jordan Faison 25-yard pass from CJ Carr (Drive: 3 plays, 38 yards, 1:06; Notre Dame 0–14)
- (3:51) ND – Jordan Faison 11-yard pass from CJ Carr (Drive: 7 plays, 58 yards, 4:07; Notre Dame 0–21)

Second quarter

- (13:43) ND – Nolan James 1-yard run (Drive: 8 plays, 64 yards, 2:55; Notre Dame 0–28)
- (4:26) ND – Nolan James 1-yard run (Drive: 2 plays, 6 yards, 0:29; Notre Dame 0–35)
- (1:17) ND – Micah Gilbert 39-yard pass from CJ Carr (Drive: 2 plays, 38 yards, 0:42; Notre Dame 0–42)

Third quarter

- (11:41) ND – Cooper Flanagan 2-yard pass from CJ Carr (Drive: 6 plays, 75 yards, 3:19; Notre Dame 0–49)
- (3:51) ND – Spencer Porath 36-yard field goal (Drive: 10 plays, 49 yards, 5:01; Notre Dame 0–52)

Fourth quarter

- No scoring plays.

Statistics	RICE	ND
First downs	7	24
Plays–yards	46–128	65–578
Rushes–yards	36–34	32–118
Passing yards	64	360
Passing: comp–att–int	8–12–0	25–33–0
Turnovers	4	0
Time of possession	27:42	32:18

Team	Category	Player	Statistics
Rice	Passing	Jacurri Brown	8/12, 64 yards
Rice	Rushing	Jacurri Brown	16 carries, 32 yards
Rice	Receiving	Barry Jackson Jr.	1 reception, 30 yards
Notre Dame	Passing	CJ Carr	16/20, 253 yards, 4 TD
Notre Dame	Rushing	Jonaz Walton	8 carries, 48 yards
Notre Dame	Receiving	Jerome Bettis Jr.	2 receptions, 61 yards

=== Western Michigan ===
Western Michigan Broncos (1–1) at Rice Owls (1–1) – Game summary

Quarter	1	2	3	4	Total
Broncos	7	7	0	14	28
Owls	0	7	7	7	21

at Rice Stadium • Houston, Texas

- Date: September 19
- Game time: 6:00 p.m. CDT
- Game weather: Sunny • Temperature: 91 °F (33 °C) • Wind: SE at 5 miles per hour (8.0 km/h)
- Game attendance: 14,255
- Referee: Matt Packowski
- TV announcers (ESPN+): Chris Elliott and Kenechi Udeze

Statistics	WMU	RICE
First downs	17	20
Plays–yards	63–333	62–330
Rushes–yards	42–217	44–209
Passing yards	116	121
Passing: comp–att–int	14–21–0	11–18–0
Turnovers	1	0
Time of possession	32:53	27:07

Team	Category	Player	Statistics
Western Michigan	Passing	Broc Lowry	14/20, 116 yards, TD
Western Michigan	Rushing	Jalen Buckley	13 carries, 117 yards, TD
Western Michigan	Receiving	Aveion Chenault	3 receptions, 62 yards, TD
Rice	Passing	Jacurri Brown	11/18, 121 yards, TD
Rice	Rushing	Jacurri Brown	23 carries, 128 yards, TD
Rice	Receiving	Barry Jackson Jr.	4 receptions, 47 yards, TD

=== at Fresno State ===
Rice Owls (1–2) at Fresno State Bulldogs (2–1) – Game summary

Quarter	1	2	3	4	Total
Owls	7	10	0	7	24
Bulldogs	0	14	10	14	38

at Valley Children's Stadium • Fresno, California

- Date: September 26
- Game time: 9:00 p.m. CDT
- Game weather: Clear • Temperature: 86 °F (30 °C) • Wind: SE at 5 miles per hour (8.0 km/h)
- Game attendance: 39,001
- Referee: Reid Jackson
- TV announcers (The CW): Rick Allen, Will Blackmon and Michael Bumpus

Game information

First quarter

- (5:38) RICE - Ben Grice 88-yard run (Enock Gota kick), (Drive: 1 play, 88 yards, 0:06; Rice 7-0)

Second quarter

- (12:51) FRES - Josiah Freeman 6-yard pass from Jayden Mandal (Manaki Watanabe kick), (Drive: 8 plays, 69 yards, 4:38; Tied 7-7)
- (8:34) RICE - Max Mosey 40-yard pass from Jacurri Brown (Enock Gota kick), (Drive: 8 plays, 75 yards, 4:16; Rice 14-7)
- (1:04) FRES - Jahlil McClain 28-yard pass from Jayden Mandal (Manaki Watanabe kick), (Drive: 6 plays, 64 yards, 0:46; Tied 14-14)
- (0:01) RICE - Enock Gota 22-yard field goal, (Drive: 9 plays, 66 yards, 1:04; Rice 17-14)

Third quarter

- (9:47) FRES - Manaki Watanabe 29-yard field goal, (Drive: 12 plays, 42 yards, 5:13; Tied 17-17)
- (4:44) FRES - Ezekiel Avit 7-yard pass from Jayden Mandal (Manaki Watanabe kick), (Drive: 5 plays, 19 yards, 2:23; Fresno State 24-17)

Fourth quarter

- (13:00) FRES - Julius Gillick 5-yard run (Manaki Watanabe kick), (Drive: 9 plays, 65 yards, 5:09; Fresno State 31-17)
- (8:58) RICE - Jacurri Brown 50-yard run (Enock Gota kick), (Drive: 9 plays, 78 yards, 3:56; Fresno State 31-24)
- (7:37) FRES - Rayshon Luke 52-yard run (Manaki Watanabe kick), (Drive: 3 plays, 75 yards, 1:21; Fresno State 38-24)

Statistics	RICE	FRES
First downs	22	23
Plays–yards	63–463	68–459
Rushes–yards	46–344	34–249
Passing yards	119	210
Passing: comp–att–int	8–17–1	22–34–0
Time of possession	27:22	32:38

Team	Category	Player	Statistics
Rice	Passing	Jacurri Brown	8/17, 119 yards, TD, INT
Rice	Rushing	Jacurri Brown	19 carries, 141 yards, TD
Rice	Receiving	Max Mosey	1 reception, 40 yards, TD
Fresno State	Passing	Jayden Mandal	22/34, 210 yards, 3 TD
Fresno State	Rushing	Rayshon Luke	11 carries, 167 yards, TD
Fresno State	Receiving	Josiah Freeman	6 receptions, 66 yards, TD

=== UTSA ===
UTSA Roadrunners (3–1) at Rice Owls (1–3) – Game summary

Quarter	1	2	Total
Roadrunners			0
Owls			0

at First Community Stadium • Houston, Texas

- Date: October 3
- Game time: 6:00 p.m. CDT
- TV: ESPN+

Statistics	UTSA	RICE
First downs		
Plays–yards		
Rushes–yards		
Passing yards		
Passing: comp–att–int		
Time of possession		

Team	Category	Player	Statistics
UTSA	Passing		
UTSA	Rushing		
UTSA	Receiving		
Rice	Passing		
Rice	Rushing		
Rice	Receiving		

=== at East Carolina ===
Rice Owls (1–4) at East Carolina Pirates (2–2) – Game summary

Quarter	1	2	Total
Owls			0
Pirates			0

at Dowdy–Ficklen Stadium • Greenville, North Carolina

- Date: October 10
- Game time: 12:00 p.m. CDT
- TV: ESPN+

Statistics	RICE	ECU
First downs		
Plays–yards		
Rushes–yards		
Passing yards		
Passing: comp–att–int		
Time of possession		

Team	Category	Player	Statistics
Rice	Passing		
Rice	Rushing		
Rice	Receiving		
East Carolina	Passing		
East Carolina	Rushing		
East Carolina	Receiving		

=== Tulsa ===
Tulsa Golden Hurricane (3–3) at Rice Owls (1–5) – Game summary

Quarter	1	2	Total
Golden Hurricane			0
Owls			0

at First Community Stadium • Houston, Texas

- Date: October 17
- Game time: TBD

Statistics	TLSA	RICE
First downs		
Plays–yards		
Rushes–yards		
Passing yards		
Passing: comp–att–int		
Time of possession		

Team	Category	Player	Statistics
Tulsa	Passing		
Tulsa	Rushing		
Tulsa	Receiving		
Rice	Passing		
Rice	Rushing		
Rice	Receiving		

=== at Florida Atlantic ===
Rice Owls (1–6) at Florida Atlantic Owls (4–2) – Game summary

Quarter	1	2	Total
Rice			0
Florida Atlantic			0

at Flagler Credit Union Stadium • Boca Raton, Florida

- Date: October 24
- Game time: TBD

Statistics	RICE	FAU
First downs		
Plays–yards		
Rushes–yards		
Passing yards		
Passing: comp–att–int		
Time of possession		

Team	Category	Player	Statistics
Rice	Passing		
Rice	Rushing		
Rice	Receiving		
Florida Atlantic	Passing		
Florida Atlantic	Rushing		
Florida Atlantic	Receiving		

=== at North Texas ===
Rice Owls (1–7) at North Texas Mean Green (6–2) – Game summary

Quarter	1	2	Total
Owls			0
Mean Green			0

at DATCU Stadium • Denton, Texas

- Date: November 7
- Game time: TBD p.m. CST

Statistics	RICE	UNT
First downs		
Plays–yards		
Rushes–yards		
Passing yards		
Passing: comp–att–int		
Time of possession		

Team	Category	Player	Statistics
Rice	Passing		
Rice	Rushing		
Rice	Receiving		
North Texas	Passing		
North Texas	Rushing		
North Texas	Receiving		

=== Tulane ===
Tulane Green Wave (4–5) at Rice Owls (1–8) – Game summary

Quarter	1	2	Total
Green Wave			0
Owls			0

at First Community Stadium • Houston, Texas

- Date: November 14
- Game time: TBD

Statistics	TULN	RICE
First downs		
Plays–yards		
Rushes–yards		
Passing yards		
Passing: comp–att–int		
Time of possession		

Team	Category	Player	Statistics
Tulane	Passing		
Tulane	Rushing		
Tulane	Receiving		
Rice	Passing		
Rice	Rushing		
Rice	Receiving		

=== at Temple ===
Rice Owls (1–9) at Temple Owls (2–8) – Game summary

Quarter	1	2	Total
Rice			0
Temple			0

at Lincoln Financial Field • Philadelphia, Pennsylvania

- Date: November 19
- Game time: 6:30 p.m. CST
- TV: ESPN

Statistics	RICE	TEM
First downs		
Plays–yards		
Rushes–yards		
Passing yards		
Passing: comp–att–int		
Time of possession		

Team	Category	Player	Statistics
Rice	Passing		
Rice	Rushing		
Rice	Receiving		
Temple	Passing		
Temple	Rushing		
Temple	Receiving		

=== Army ===
Army Black Knights (5–5) at Rice Owls (2–9) – Game summary

Quarter	1	2	Total
Black Knights			0
Owls			0

at First Community Stadium • Houston, Texas

- Date: November 28
- Game time: TBD

Statistics	ARMY	RICE
First downs		
Plays–yards		
Rushes–yards		
Passing yards		
Passing: comp–att–int		
Time of possession		

Team	Category	Player	Statistics
Army	Passing		
Army	Rushing		
Army	Receiving		
Rice	Passing		
Rice	Rushing		
Rice	Receiving		

== Roster ==
2026 Rice Owls football team roster
Players
Coaches
Offense

Pos.	#	Name	Class
WR	0	Payton Matthews	So
QB	2	Lucas Scheerhorn	RSo
QB	4	Gael Ochoa	RSo
WR	5	Davis Lane	RSr
WR	6	Ben Grice	RSo
WR	7	Barry Jackson Jr.	RJr
WR	8	Colin Leahey	RFr
TE	9	Preston Zinter	RJr
RB	10	Quinton Jackson	RSr
QB	11	Jacurri Brown	RSr
WR	13	Max Mosey	RSr
QB	14	Ayden Wilhelm	Fr
QB	15	Patrick Crayton Jr.	RFr
WR	17	Jake Renda	RSr
WR	18	Owen Carter	RSo
WR	19	Jordan Clark	RFr
WR	21	Sawyer Rice	Fr
WR	22	Michael Sifford	Fr
WR	23	Chris Bruce	RJr
WR	24	Larry DeBose IV	RSo
TE	25	Rhys Phillips	RSo
RB	26	Tyvonn Byars	So
RB	27	Dionne Sims	Fr
RB	28	D’Andre Hardeman Jr.	So
WR	29	Jai Jacobs-Ford	Fr
RB	30	Carson Morgan	RJr
RB	33	Justin Powell	Fr
TE	41	Preston Healy	Fr
OL	50	Patrick Valent	RJr
OL	53	Luke Miller	RSo
OL	56	Nate Bledsoe	RJr
OL	57	Leyonte Chandler	Fr
OL	58	Peyton Farmer	RJr
OL	59	Colter Alberding	RFr
OL	60	Leo Bluhm	RSr
OL	62	Cullen Witt	RSo
OL	67	Luke Needham	RJr
OL	68	Scott Becker	RSr
OL	70	Bennett Eivens	Fr
OL	71	Cole Principe	So
OL	73	Justin Michaelis	RFr
OL	74	Clay Mitchell	Fr
OL	76	Marcus Page Jr.	Fr
OL	77	Ian Bothwell	RFr
OL	78	Erben Birkhoff	RFr
WR	81	Braylen Walker	RSr
TE	82	Colten Cole	Fr
WR	83	Jackson Ranucci	RSo
TE	84	Will Swartz	RFr
TE	86	James Falk	RJr
TE	87	Jackson DeAtley	Fr
WR	88	Keenan Arcega-Whiteside	RFr
WR	89	Preston Jackson	Fr

Defense

Pos.	#	Name	Class
S	0	Daveon Hook	GS
CB	1	Zach Cody	RSo
DB	2	Jo Chavez	Jr
S	3	Koa Akui	RSr
CB	4	Tariq Watson	RSr
CB	5	Jerrick Harper	Sr
S	6	Dylan Stephens	So
DB	7	AJ Brown	RSr
DL	8	Joseph Mutombo	RJr
CB	10	Kyren Condoll	RSo
DL	11	Christopher Clark-Jolivet	RJr
CB	12	Jamir Benjamin	RSo
EDGE	13	Tariq May	RSr
LB	14	Beau Barton	RJr
DL	15	Matthew Aribisala	RSr
DL	16	Chibby Nwajuaku	RSr
S	18	Ahran Ogbor	So
S	20	Bailey Fletcher	RSo
DL	21	JD Singletary	Fr
CB	24	Jordan Mitchell	Fr
DB	25	Caden VerMaas	RFr
S	27	Michael Amey III	RFr
S	32	Seth Brown	Fr
LB	33	Stone Combs	GS
LB	34	Kaleb Blanton	RSo
CB	35	Elijah Brown	Fr
S	36	Austin Lee	Fr
LB	40	Jayden Cupitt	Fr
EDGE	42	DeReyon Jenkins	RFr
DL	43	Ian Harrell	Fr
LB	44	Cooper King	RJr
LB	54	Austin Harnetiaux	RSr
LB	55	CJ Witten	RFr
EDGE	56	Seth Clarke	Fr
DL	57	Aquantis Clemmons	RJr
DL	88	Tyler Lavallier	Fr
DL	91	DD Oliver	RFr
DL	92	Luca Akirtava	RFr
DL	93	Quincy Tchikou	Fr
DL	94	Braden Bays	RFr
DL	95	Brock Reddic	RSo
DL	96	Dillan Botts	Sr
DL	97	Chris Knauls	Fr
DL	98	Robert Rooks	RFr

Special teams

Pos.	#	Name	Class
K	28	Enock Gota	RSr
P	29	Charlie Durkin	RSr
K	49	Tommy Bauchiero	Fr
LS	51	Phoenix Derichsweiler	RFr
LS	52	Morrow Evans	RSo

Head coach

- Scott Abell

Coordinators/assistant coaches

- Wayne Lineburg – Assistant Head Coach/Tight Ends
- Vince Munch – Offensive Coordinator/Offensive Line
- Jon Kay – Defensive Coordinator
- Porter Abell – Pass Game Coordinator/Quarterbacks
- Austin Eisenhofer – Run Game Coordinator/Inside Receivers
- Mark Hogan – Linebackers/Special Teams Coordinator
- Brian Brown – Outside Receivers
- Kerry Cooks – Safeties
- Tevin Madison – Cornerbacks
- Eli Rasheed – Defensive Line
- Taylor Sauer – Rush Ends
- Johnathan Wilson – Running Backs
- Clay Davie – Assistant Offensive Line
- Tafon Mainsah – Assistant Safeties
- Nick Schrage – Assistant Special Teams
- Coy Williams – Assistant Backfield
- Mario Magana Jr. – Defensive Graduate Assistant
- Kyle Persons – Defensive Graduate Assistant
- Izeya Floyd – Offensive Graduate Assistant
- Eli Turner Jr – Offensive Graduate Assistant
- Lew Caralla – Head Strength & Conditioning Coach
- Corey Bell – Associate Strength & Conditioning Coach
- Colin Belvin – Assistant Strength & Conditioning Coach / Director of Football Sports Science
- Gage Gambrell – Assistant Strength & Conditioning Coach
- Nick Decker – Chief of Staff/Director of Football Operations
- Steven Jackson – General Manager
- Sydney Davis – Director of Internal Operations/Assistant to the Head Coach
- Chad Johnson – Director of Player Personnel and High School Relations
- Ryan Haworth – Video Coordinator
- Jude Holloway – Assistant Video Cooridnator
- Alex Shields – Director of Recruiting/Assistant Director of Football Operations
- Zefa Tullis-Thompson – Assistant Director of Recruiting & Football Operations/Office Coordinator
- Nick Baker – On-Campus Recruiting Coordinator/Scouting Assistant.
- Tyler Calhoun – Coordinator of Football Scouting
- Kiersten Hardeman – Director of Creative Media
- Lloyd McFarquar – Recruiting Assistant
- Will Fife – Assistant Athletic Director of Equipment Operations
- Wesley Smith – Equipment Assistant
- Luis Mendez – Equipment Assistant

Legend

- (C) Team captain
- (S) Suspended
- (I) Ineligible
- Injured
- Redshirt

Roster
