= 2024 Independence Bowl =

Postseason college football bowl game

2024 Radiance Technologies Independence Bowl
- 48th Independence Bowl
Louisiana Tech Bulldogs	Army Black Knights
(5–7)	(11–2)
Conference USA	The American
6	27
Head coach: Sonny Cumbie	Head coach: Jeff Monken
	AP / Coaches / CFP; 19 / 18 / 22
	1	2	3	4	Total
Louisiana Tech	0	3	3	0	6
Army	14	7	0	6	27
- Date: December 28, 2024
- Season: 2024
- Stadium: Independence Stadium
- Location: Shreveport, Louisiana
- MVP: Off.: Bryson Daily (QB, Army); Def.: Kalib Fortner (LB, Army)
- Favorite: Army by 14.5
- Referee: Jeremy Valentine (MAC)
- Attendance: 34,283

United States TV coverage
- Network: ESPN
- Announcers: Lowell Galindo (play-by-play), Fozzy Whittaker (analyst), and Tori Petry (sideline)

The 2024 Independence Bowl was a college football bowl game played on December 28, 2024, at Independence Stadium located in Shreveport, Louisiana. The game began at approximately 8:15 p.m. CST and aired on ESPN. The Independence Bowl was one of the 2024–25 bowl games concluding the 2024 FBS football season. The game was sponsored by engineering services company Radiance Technologies and was officially known as the 2024 Radiance Technologies Independence Bowl.

The 48th annual Independence Bowl game was originally set to feature Marshall and Army. However, Marshall withdrew from the contest after a number of its players entered the NCAA transfer portal. Louisiana Tech was named as Marshall's replacement on December 14. Marshall was subsequently fined $100,000 by their conference, the Sun Belt, for opting out of the bowl.

== Teams ==
The original match-up of Marshall and Army was announced on December 8. However, Marshall withdrew from the game after a plethora of players entered the NCAA transfer portal following the departure of head coach Charles Huff to Southern Miss. Louisiana Tech was selected to replace Marshall.

=== Louisiana Tech Bulldogs ===
Louisiana Tech ended their regular season with a 5–7 record (4–4 in conference play). The Bulldogs began the season with four losses in five games, then went 4–4 in their remaining eight games. They did not face any ranked FBS teams. Louisiana Tech plays their home games at Joe Aillet Stadium in Ruston, Louisiana, approximately 70 miles (110 km) east of Shreveport, Louisiana, home of the Independence Bowl.

=== Army Black Knights ===
Army played to a 10–1 record (8–0 in conference play) and earned a spot in the American Athletic Conference Championship Game, where they defeated Tulane, 35–14. They then faced Navy in the annual Army–Navy Game and suffered a 31–13 defeat. The only other team to defeat Army was the one ranked team they faced, Notre Dame. Army entered the bowl with an 11–2 record and ranked 22nd in the final College Football Playoff (CFP) rankings, 19th in the AP poll.

== Game summary ==
2024 Radiance Technologies Independence Bowl

Quarter	1	2	3	4	Total
Louisiana Tech	0	3	3	0	6
No. 22 Army	14	7	0	6	27

at Independence Stadium • Shreveport, Louisiana

- Date: Saturday, December 28, 2024
- Game time: 8:22 p.m. CST
- Game weather: Clear • Temperature: 54 °F (12 °C) • Wind: 12 mph (19 km/h) northeast
- Game attendance: 34,283
- Referee: Jeremy Valentine
- TV announcers (ESPN): Lowell Galindo (play-by-play), Fozzy Whittaker (analyst), and Tori Petry (sideline)
- Box score

Game information
First quarter
- ARMY – Trey Gronotte 15-yard run (Trey Gronotte kick), 9:32. Army 7–0. Drive: 8 play, 80 yards, 4:05.
- ARMY – Hayden Reed 12-yard run (Trey Gronotte kick), 1:28. Army 14–0. Drive: 10 play, 80 yards, 5:39.

Second quarter

- LT – Drew Henderson 27-yard field goal, 14:15. Army 14–3. Drive: 7 plays, 56 yards, 2:13.
- ARMY – Bryson Daily 8-yard run (Trey Gronotte kick), 1:54. Army 21–3. Drive: 21 plays, 75 yards, 12:21.

Third quarter

- LT – Drew Henderson 44-yard field goal, 2:11. Army 21–6. Drive: 11 plays, 39 yards, 5:33.

Fourth quarter

- ARMY – Bryson Daily 3-yard run (2-point run conversion failed), 14:56. Army 27–6. Drive: 5 plays, 75 yard, 2:15.

=== Statistics ===
Statistics	LT	ARMY
First downs	11	26
Plays–yards	50–218	73–386
Rushes–yards	49	321
Passing yards	169	65
Passing: comp–att–int	14–28–1	2–9–0
Time of possession	19:52	40:08

Team	Category	Player	Statistics
Louisiana Tech	Passing	Evan Bullock	14/28, 169 yards, INT
Louisiana Tech	Rushing	Omiri Wiggins	8 carries, 40 yards
Louisiana Tech	Receiving	Tru Edwards	8 receptions, 92 yards
Army	Passing	Bryson Daily	2/9, 65 yards
Army	Rushing	Bryson Daily	27 carries, 127 yards, 3 TD
Army	Receiving	David Crossan	1 reception, 52 yards
