= Bryson Daily =

American Soldier and former college football player

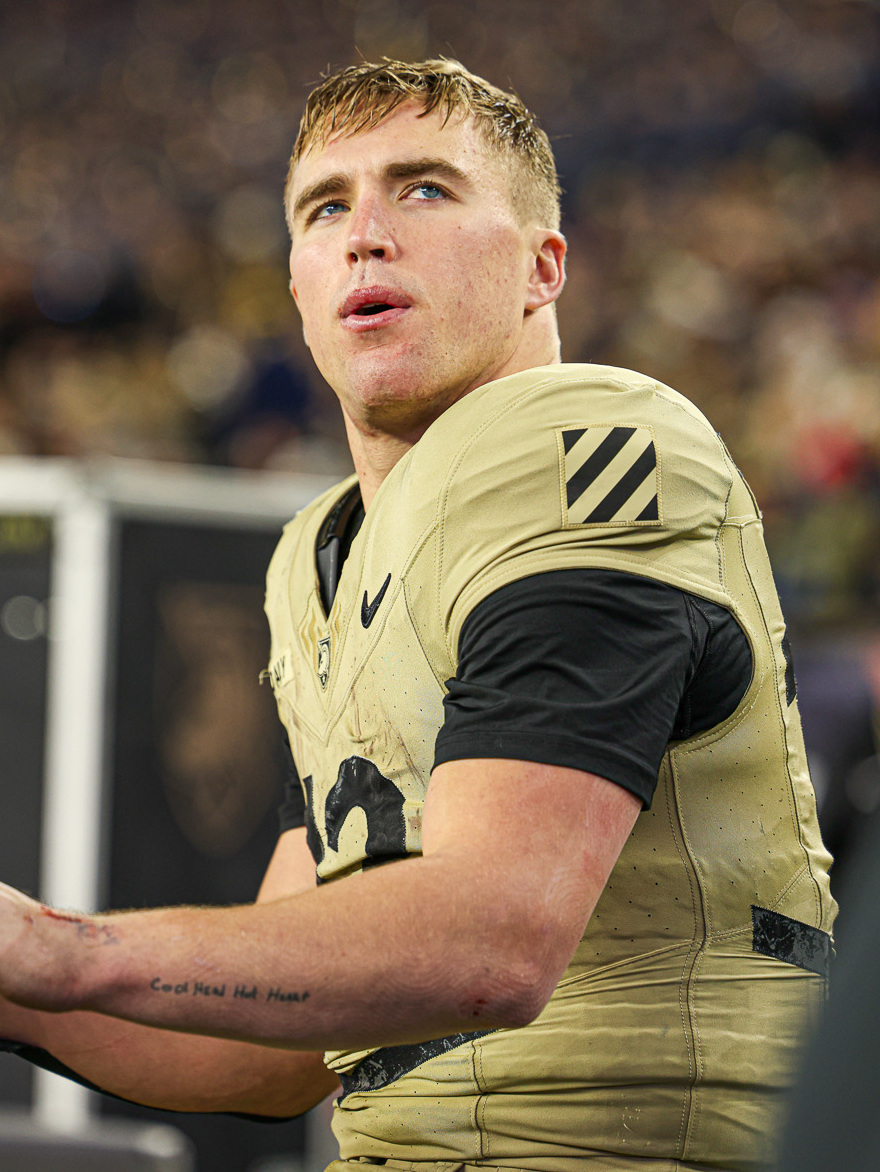
- Daily in 2023

No. 13
- Position: Quarterback

Personal information
- Listed height: 6 ft 0 in (1.83 m)
- Listed weight: 221 lb (100 kg)

Career information
- High school: Abernathy (Abernathy, Texas)
- College: Army (2021–2024)

Awards and highlights
- NCAA rushing touchdowns leader (2024); NCAA scoring leader (2024); AAC Offensive Player of the Year (2024); First-team All-AAC (2024); American Athletic Conference Football Championship Game MVP (2024)
- Stats at ESPN

Bryson Daily is an American former college football player who was a quarterback for the Army Black Knights.

== Early life ==
Daily attended Abernathy High School in Abernathy, Texas, where he lettered in football, basketball and baseball. He completed 314 of 646 pass attempts for 4,833 yards, 64 touchdowns and 40 interceptions, rushed for 6,326 yards and 97 touchdowns, and hauled in two receptions for 77 yards. Daily committed to play college football at the United States Military Academy.

== College career ==
As a freshman in 2021, Daily appeared in only one game. In 2022, he appeared in five games and finished the season with 12 rushing attempts for 163 yards and two touchdowns. In week 7 game against Louisiana–Monroe, Daily made his first career touchdown while running for 64 yards. In week 11 game against UMass, he ran six times for 79 yards and a touchdown.

Prior to the 2023 season, Daily was named to the Earl Campbell Tyler Rose Award watchlist. During the season, he was named as the starting quarterback making his first career start against Louisiana-Monroe. In week 2 game against Delaware State, Daily completed eight out of 11 passing attempts for 193 yards and three touchdowns along with nine carries for 65 yards and two rushing touchdowns. In week 4 game against Syracuse, he completed nine of 21 passing attempts for 145 yards with one touchdown and two interceptions. In week 6 game against Troy, Daily completed three of 4 pass attempts for 15 yards and completed 46 rushing yards for 10 attempts before suffering a leg injury before halftime.

During the 2024 season, Daily led the Black Knights to their 1st American Athletic Conference Championship and a #21 final AP rank. At the 2024 Independence Bowl against Louisiana Tech, Daily set an FBS record for most rushing touchdowns in a season by a quarterback with his 32nd rushing touchdown of the season. His 32 rushing TDs placed him tied for 3rd place on the NCAA's all-time single-season rushing TDs list behind only Barry Sanders and Montee Ball. At the end of the season, the National Quarterback Club (NQBC) named Daily the National Collegiate Quarterback of the Year. Daily was also named the AAC Offensive Player of the Year and finished 6th in voting for the Heisman Trophy.

=== Statistics ===
Legend
	Led the NCAA
**Bold**	Career high

Year	Team	Games			Passing								Rushing			
Year	Team	GP	GS	Record	Comp	Att	Pct	Yards	Avg	TD	Int	Rate	Att	Yards	Avg	TD
2021	Army	1	0	0−0	0	0	0.0	0	0.0	0	0	0.0	0	0	0.0	0
2022	Army	5	0	0−0	0	1	0.0	0	0.0	0	0	0.0	12	163	**13.6**	2
2023	Army	11	10	6−4	**60**	**120**	50.0	913	7.6	7	**6**	123.2	215	901	4.2	7
2024	Army	**13**	**13**	**11−2**	54	103	**52.4**	**1,007**	**10.0**	**9**	4	**155.6**	**310**	**1,659**	5.4	**32**
Career		30	23	17−6	114	224	50.9	1,920	8.6	16	10	137.5	537	2,723	5.1	41

== Military career ==
Following his graduation in 2025, Daily began his five-year service obligation in the United States Army as an infantry officer.
