= Gael Ochoa =

American football player

No. 4 – Rice Owls
- Position: Quarterback
- Class: Redshirt Sophomore

Personal information
- Listed height: 6 ft 1 in (1.85 m)
- Listed weight: 197 lb (89 kg)

Career information
- High school: Pebble Hills (El Paso, Texas)
- College: UNLV (2024–2025); Rice (2026–present)
- Stats at ESPN

Gael Ochoa is an American football quarterback for the Rice Owls. He previously played for the UNLV Rebels.

== Early life ==
Ochoa attended Pebble Hills High School in El Paso, Texas. He was a three-year starter at quarterback. As a senior, he passed for 2,107 yards and 15 touchdowns and ran for 886 yards and three touchdowns. Ochoa committed to play college football for the UTEP Miners. However, he flipped his commitment to play for the UNLV Rebels.

== College career ==
In two seasons at UNLV from 2024 to 2025, Ochoa recorded two carries in three games played. After the 2025 season, he entered the NCAA transfer portal.

Ochoa transferred to play for the Rice Owls. In week 8 of the 2026 season, he made his first career start, rushing for 259 yards and four touchdowns on 12 carries, while also throwing a 71-yard touchdown pass in a loss to Florida Atlantic. For his performance versus Florida Atlantic, Ochoa was named the Latino Player of the Week.
