= 2026 Florida Atlantic Owls football team =

American college football season

2026 Florida Atlantic Owls football
- Conference: American Conference
- Record: 7–4 (4–3 American)
- Head coach: Zach Kittley (2nd season)
- Offensive scheme: Air raid
- Defensive coordinator: Brett Dewhurst (2nd season)
- Base defense: Multiple 4–2–5
- Home stadium: Flagler Credit Union Stadium

2026 American Conference football standings
| | Conf. | | | Overall |
| Team | W | | L | W | | L |
|---|---|---|---|---|---|---|
| UTSA | 6 | – | 1 | 9 | – | 2 |
| Memphis | 5 | – | 2 | 8 | – | 3 |
| East Carolina | 5 | – | 2 | 7 | – | 4 |
| North Texas | 5 | – | 2 | 7 | – | 4 |
| UAB | 4 | – | 3 | 6 | – | 5 |
| Army | 4 | – | 3 | 5 | – | 5 |
| Tulsa | 4 | – | 3 | 7 | – | 4 |
| Florida Atlantic | 4 | – | 3 | 7 | – | 4 |
| Tulane | 4 | – | 3 | 6 | – | 5 |
| Navy | 3 | – | 4 | 4 | – | 6 |
| South Florida | 2 | – | 5 | 6 | – | 5 |
| Rice | 1 | – | 6 | 2 | – | 9 |
| Charlotte | 1 | – | 6 | 1 | – | 10 |
| Temple | 1 | – | 6 | 2 | – | 9 |
Championship: December 5, 2026
As of November 22, 2026; Rankings from AP poll

The 2026 Florida Atlantic Owls football team is who represents Florida Atlantic University as a member of the American Conference during the 2026 NCAA Division I FBS football season. They are led by second-year head coach Zach Kittley, and finally play their home games at Flagler Credit Union Stadium in Boca Raton, Florida.

== Schedule ==
| Date | Time | Opponent | Site | TV | Result | Attendance |
|---|---|---|---|---|---|---|
| September 5 | 7:45 p.m. | at Florida* | Ben Hill Griffin Stadium; Gainesville, FL | SECN | L 21–66 | 90,295 |
| September 12 | 7:30 p.m. | Navy | Flagler Credit Union Stadium; Boca Raton, FL | ESPNU | W 38–30 | 22,273 |
| September 19 | 6:00 p.m. | FIU* | Flagler Credit Union Stadium; Boca Raton, FL (Shula Bowl) | ESPN+ | W 16–10 | 20,714 |
| September 26 | 8:00 p.m. | at Louisiana–Monroe* | FMOL Health/St. Francis Stadium; Monroe, LA | ESPN+ | W 45–17 | 15,326 |
| October 3 | 6:00 p.m. | Texas Southern* | Flagler Credit Union Stadium; Boca Raton, FL | ESPN+ | W 66–10 | 23,736 |
| October 17 | 12:00 p.m. | at Army | Michie Stadium; West Point, NY | CBSSN | L 24–56 | 28,537 |
| October 24 | 12:00 p.m. | Rice | Flagler Credit Union Stadium; Boca Raton, FL | ESPNU | W 51–49 | 14,212 |
| October 29 | 7:30 p.m. | at North Texas | DATCU Stadium; Denton, TX | ESPN | L 41–48 | 22,092 |
| November 5 | 7:30 p.m. | UTSA | Flagler Credit Union Stadium; Boca Raton, FL | ESPN | W 60–29 | 19,115 |
| November 14 | 7:15 p.m. | at Tulsa | H.A. Chapman Stadium; Tulsa, OK | ESPN+ | L 21–38 | 17,384 |
| November 21 | 2:30 p.m. | South Florida | Flagler Credit Union Stadium; Boca Raton, FL | ESPN+ | W 35–14 | 18,881 |
| November 28 | 1:00 p.m. | at East Carolina | Dowdy–Ficklen Stadium; Greenville, NC | ESPN+ | | |
*Non-conference game; All times are in Eastern time

== Game summaries ==
=== at Florida ===
Florida Atlantic Owls (0–0) at Florida Gators (0–0) – Game summary

| Quarter | 1 | 2 | 3 | 4 | Total |
|---|---|---|---|---|---|
| Owls | 0 | 14 | 7 | 0 | 21 |
| Gators | 17 | 21 | 14 | 14 | 66 |

at Ben Hill Griffin Stadium • Gainesville, Florida

- Date: September 5
- Game time: 7:45 p.m. EDT
- Game weather: Cloudy • Temperature: 83 °F (28 °C) • Wind: SW at 3 miles per hour (4.8 km/h)
- Game attendance: 90,295
- Referee: James Carter
- TV announcers (SECN): Matt Schumacker, Aaron Murray and Taylor Davis

Game information

First quarter

- FLA – Vernell Brown III 49-yard pass from Aaron Philo (Patrick Durkin kick), 8:41. Gators 7–0. Drive: 7 plays, 94 yards, 3:20.
- FLA – Bailey Stockton 12-yard pass from Aaron Philo (Patrick Durkin kick), 6:28. Gators 14–0. Drive: 3 plays, 48 yards, 0:50.
- FLA – Patrick Durkin 53-yard field goal, 2:06. Gators 17–0. Drive: 7 plays, 42 yards, 3:24.

Second quarter

- FAU – Ethan Ervin 1-yard run (Collin Rogers kick), 13:54. Gators 17–7. Drive: 13 plays, 75 yards, 3:12.
- FLA – Aaron Philo 3-yard run (Patrick Durkin kick), 11:02. Gators 24–7. Drive: 6 plays, 75 yards, 2:52.
- FAU – Caden Veltkamp 7-yard run (Collin Rogers kick), 6:50. Gators 24–14. Drive: 12 plays, 78 yards, 4:07.
- FLA – Jadan Baugh 12-yard run (Patrick Durkin kick), 4:05. Gators 31–14. Drive: 8 plays, 75 yards, 2:45.
- FLA – Jadan Baugh 7-yard run (Patrick Durkin kick), 2:50. Gators 38–14. Drive: 3 plays, 29 yards, 1:10.

Third quarter

- FLA – Jadan Baugh 6-yard run (Patrick Durkin kick), 13:08. Gators 45–14. Drive: 4 plays, 75 yards, 1:52.
- FLA – Duke Clark 10-yard pass from Aaron Philo (Patrick Durkin kick), 4:21. Gators 52–14. Drive: 8 plays, 79 yards, 4:47.
- FAU – Kelby Valsin 20-yard pass from Caden Veltkamp (Collin Rogers kick), 1:15. Gators 52–21. Drive: 9 plays, 75 yards, 3:06.

Fourth quarter

- FLA – Duke Clark 4-yard run (Patrick Durkin kick), 12:24. Gators 59–21. Drive: 8 plays, 75 yards, 3:51.
- FLA – Micah Jones 6-yard pass from Tramell Jones Jr. (Liam Padron kick), 0:25. Gators 66–21. Drive: 11 plays, 89 yards, 6:14.

| Statistics | FAU | FLA |
|---|---|---|
| First downs | 25 | 30 |
| Plays–yards | 90–396 | 67–624 |
| Rushes–yards | 37–120 | 41–281 |
| Passing yards | 276 | 343 |
| Passing: comp–att–int | 34–53–2 | 20–26–1 |
| Turnovers | 3 | 1 |
| Time of possession | 28:24 | 31:36 |

| Team | Category | Player | Statistics |
|---|---|---|---|
| FAU | Passing | Caden Veltkamp | 34/52, 276 yards, TD, 2 INT |
| FAU | Rushing | Leonard Farrow | 10 carries, 51 yards |
| FAU | Receiving | Kelby Vaslin | 10 receptions, 96 yards, TD |
| Florida | Passing | Aaron Philo | 16/21, 275 yards, 3 TD, INT |
| Florida | Rushing | Jadan Baugh | 14 carries, 160 yards, 3 TD |
| Florida | Receiving | Vernell Brown III | 6 receptions, 117 yards, TD |

=== Navy ===
Navy Midshipmen (1–0) at Florida Atlantic Owls (0–1) – Game summary

| Quarter | 1 | 2 | 3 | 4 | Total |
|---|---|---|---|---|---|
| Midshipmen | 7 | 0 | 7 | 16 | 30 |
| Owls | 14 | 17 | 7 | 0 | 38 |

at Flagler Credit Union Stadium • Boca Raton, Florida

- Date: September 12
- Game time: 7:30 p.m. EDT
- Game weather: Cloudy • Temperature: 81 °F (27 °C) • Wind: SE at 6 miles per hour (9.7 km/h)
- Game attendance: 22,273
- Referee: Charles Lamertina
- TV announcers (ESPNU): Courtney Lyle and Rene Ingoglia

Game information

First quarter

- FAU – Easton Messer 76-yard pass from Caden Veltkamp (Collin Rogers kick), 14:18. Owls 7–0. Drive: 2 plays, 75 yards, 0:42.
- NAVY – Braxton Woodson 48-yard run (Nolan Bartley kick), 13:12. Tied 7–7. Drive: 3 plays, 75 yards, 1:06.
- FAU – Easton Messer 36-yard pass from Caden Veltkamp (Collin Rogers kick), 6:59. Owls 14–7. Drive: 3 plays, 72 yards, 0:45.

Second quarter

- FAU – Kelby Valsin 30-yard pass from Caden Veltkamp (Collin Rogers kick), 5:26. Owls 21–7. Drive: 9 plays, 79 yards, 4:25.
- FAU – Dominique Henry 13-yard pass from Caden Veltkamp (Collin Rogers kick), 0:19. Owls 28–7. Drive: 9 plays, 75 yards, 2:17.
- FAU – Collin Rogers 60-yard field goal, 0:00. Owls 31–7. Drive: 2 plays, 5 yards, 0:07.

Third quarter

- FAU – AJ Johnson 5-yard pass from Caden Veltkamp (Collin Rogers kick), 2:39. Owls 38–7. Drive: 16 plays, 80 yards, 7:13.
- NAVY – Jordan Collins 64-yard pass from Jackson Gutierrez (Nolan Bartley kick), 1:16. Owls 38–14. Drive: 3 plays, 75 yards, 1:23.

Fourth quarter

- NAVY – Charles Robinson 8-yard pass from Jackson Gutierrez (run failed), 5:41. Owls 38–20. Drive: 11 plays, 85 yards, 5:31.
- NAVY – Team safety, 3:12. Owls 38–22.
- NAVY – Jackson Gutierrez 49-yard run (Jackson Gutierrez–Vic Listorti pass), 1:46. Owls 38–30. Drive: 6 plays, 58 yards, 1:21.

| Statistics | NAVY | FAU |
|---|---|---|
| First downs | 18 | 27 |
| Plays–yards | 60–393 | 78–373 |
| Rushes–yards | 37–246 | 45–(-8) |
| Passing yards | 147 | 386 |
| Passing: comp–att–int | 9–23–1 | 27–33–0 |
| Turnovers | 2 | 0 |
| Time of possession | 26:10 | 33:50 |

| Team | Category | Player | Statistics |
|---|---|---|---|
| Navy | Passing | Jackson Gutierrez | 6/12, 100 yards, 2 TD |
| Navy | Rushing | Braxton Woodson | 12 carries, 96 yards, TD |
| Navy | Receiving | Jordan Collins | 2 receptions, 68 yards, TD |
| Florida Atlantic | Passing | Caden Veltkamp | 27/32, 386 yards, 5 TD |
| Florida Atlantic | Rushing | Ethan Ervin | 17 carries, 67 yards |
| Florida Atlantic | Receiving | Easton Messer | 8 receptions, 179 yards, 2 TD |

=== FIU (Shula Bowl) ===
FIU Panthers (1–1) at Florida Atlantic Owls (1–1) – Game summary

| Quarter | 1 | 2 | 3 | 4 | Total |
|---|---|---|---|---|---|
| Panthers | 0 | 7 | 0 | 3 | 10 |
| Owls | 10 | 0 | 6 | 0 | 16 |

at Flagler Credit Union Stadium • Boca Raton, Florida

- Date: September 19
- Game time: 6:00 p.m. EDT
- Game weather: Cloudy • Temperature: 82 °F (28 °C) • Wind: SW at 3 mph
- Game attendance: 20,714
- Referee: Matt Overton
- TV announcers (ESPN+): AJ Ricketts (play-by-play), Patrick Murray (analyst) and Maria Trivelpiece (sideline)

| Statistics | FIU | FAU |
|---|---|---|
| First downs | 21 | 17 |
| Plays–yards | 78–357 | 67–258 |
| Rushes–yards | 35–95 | 31–56 |
| Passing yards | 262 | 202 |
| Passing: comp–att–int | 22–43–3 | 24–36–0 |
| Turnovers | 3 | 0 |
| Time of possession | 28:39 | 26:12 |

| Team | Category | Player | Statistics |
|---|---|---|---|
| FIU | Passing | JJ Kohl | 22/43, 262 yards, 3 INT |
| FIU | Rushing | Anthony Carrie | 19 carries, 44 yards |
| FIU | Receiving | Maguire Anderson | 8 receptions, 139 yards |
| Florida Atlantic | Passing | Caden Veltkamp | 24/36, 202 yards |
| Florida Atlantic | Rushing | Ethan Ervin | 13 carries, 36 yards |
| Florida Atlantic | Receiving | Easton Messer | 7 receptions, 83 yards |

=== at Louisiana–Monroe ===
Florida Atlantic Owls (2–1) at Louisiana–Monroe Warhawks (0–3) – Game summary

| Quarter | 1 | 2 | Total |
|---|---|---|---|
| Owls | | | 0 |
| Warhawks | | | 0 |

at Malone Stadium • Monroe, Louisiana

- Date: September 26
- Game time: 8:00 p.m. EDT
- TV: ESPN+

| Statistics | FAU | ULM |
|---|---|---|
| First downs | | |
| Plays–yards | | |
| Rushes–yards | | |
| Passing yards | | |
| Passing: comp–att–int | | |
| Time of possession | | |

| Team | Category | Player | Statistics |
|---|---|---|---|
| Florida Atlantic | Passing | | |
| Florida Atlantic | Rushing | | |
| Florida Atlantic | Receiving | | |
| Louisiana–Monroe | Passing | | |
| Louisiana–Monroe | Rushing | | |
| Louisiana–Monroe | Receiving | | |

=== Texas Southern (FCS) ===
Texas Southern Tigers (1–3) at Florida Atlantic Owls (3–1) – Game summary

| Quarter | 1 | 2 | Total |
|---|---|---|---|
| Tigers (FCS) | | | 0 |
| Owls | | | 0 |

at Flagler Credit Union Stadium • Boca Raton, Florida

- Date: October 3
- Game time: 6:00 p.m. EDT
- TV: ESPN+

| Statistics | TXSO | FAU |
|---|---|---|
| First downs | | |
| Plays–yards | | |
| Rushes–yards | | |
| Passing yards | | |
| Passing: comp–att–int | | |
| Time of possession | | |

| Team | Category | Player | Statistics |
|---|---|---|---|
| Texas Southern | Passing | | |
| Texas Southern | Rushing | | |
| Texas Southern | Receiving | | |
| Florida Atlantic | Passing | | |
| Florida Atlantic | Rushing | | |
| Florida Atlantic | Receiving | | |

=== at Army ===
Florida Atlantic Owls (4–1) at Army Black Knights (3–2) – Game summary

| Quarter | 1 | 2 | Total |
|---|---|---|---|
| Owls | | | 0 |
| Black Knights | | | 0 |

at Michie Stadium • West Point, New York

- Date: October 17
- Game time: 12:00 p.m. EDT
- TV: CBSSN

| Statistics | FAU | ARMY |
|---|---|---|
| First downs | | |
| Plays–yards | | |
| Rushes–yards | | |
| Passing yards | | |
| Passing: comp–att–int | | |
| Time of possession | | |

| Team | Category | Player | Statistics |
|---|---|---|---|
| Florida Atlantic | Passing | | |
| Florida Atlantic | Rushing | | |
| Florida Atlantic | Receiving | | |
| Army | Passing | | |
| Army | Rushing | | |
| Army | Receiving | | |

=== Rice ===
Rice Owls (1–6) at Florida Atlantic Owls (4–2) – Game summary

| Quarter | 1 | 2 | Total |
|---|---|---|---|
| Rice | | | 0 |
| Florida Atlantic | | | 0 |

at Flagler Credit Union Stadium • Boca Raton, Florida

- Date: October 24
- Game time: TBD

| Statistics | RICE | FAU |
|---|---|---|
| First downs | | |
| Plays–yards | | |
| Rushes–yards | | |
| Passing yards | | |
| Passing: comp–att–int | | |
| Time of possession | | |

| Team | Category | Player | Statistics |
|---|---|---|---|
| Rice | Passing | | |
| Rice | Rushing | | |
| Rice | Receiving | | |
| Florida Atlantic | Passing | | |
| Florida Atlantic | Rushing | | |
| Florida Atlantic | Receiving | | |

=== at North Texas ===
Florida Atlantic Owls (5–2) at North Texas Mean Green (5–2) – Game summary

| Quarter | 1 | 2 | Total |
|---|---|---|---|
| Owls | | | 0 |
| Mean Green | | | 0 |

at DATCU Stadium • Denton, Texas

- Date: October 29
- Game time: 7:30 p.m. EDT
- TV: ESPN/ESPN2

| Statistics | FAU | UNT |
|---|---|---|
| First downs | | |
| Plays–yards | | |
| Rushes–yards | | |
| Passing yards | | |
| Passing: comp–att–int | | |
| Time of possession | | |

| Team | Category | Player | Statistics |
|---|---|---|---|
| Florida Atlantic | Passing | | |
| Florida Atlantic | Rushing | | |
| Florida Atlantic | Receiving | | |
| North Texas | Passing | | |
| North Texas | Rushing | | |
| North Texas | Receiving | | |

=== UTSA ===
UTSA Roadrunners (7–1) at Florida Atlantic Owls (5–3) – Game summary

| Quarter | 1 | 2 | Total |
|---|---|---|---|
| Roadrunners | | | 0 |
| Owls | | | 0 |

at Flagler Credit Union Stadium • Boca Raton, Florida

- Date: November 5
- Game time: 7:30 p.m.
- TV announcers (ESPN): Matt Barrie (play by play), Chase Daniel (analyst), and Paul Carcaterra (reporter)

| Statistics | UTSA | FAU |
|---|---|---|
| First downs | | |
| Plays–yards | | |
| Rushes–yards | | |
| Passing yards | | |
| Passing: comp–att–int | | |
| Time of possession | | |

| Team | Category | Player | Statistics |
|---|---|---|---|
| UTSA | Passing | | |
| UTSA | Rushing | | |
| UTSA | Receiving | | |
| Florida Atlantic | Passing | | |
| Florida Atlantic | Rushing | | |
| Florida Atlantic | Receiving | | |

=== at Tulsa ===
Florida Atlantic Owls (6–3) at Tulsa Golden Hurricane (5–4) – Game summary

| Quarter | 1 | 2 | Total |
|---|---|---|---|
| Owls | | | 0 |
| Golden Hurricane | | | 0 |

at Skelly Field at H. A. Chapman Stadium • Tulsa, Oklahoma

- Date: November 14
- Game time: TBD

| Statistics | FAU | TLSA |
|---|---|---|
| First downs | | |
| Plays–yards | | |
| Rushes–yards | | |
| Passing yards | | |
| Passing: comp–att–int | | |
| Time of possession | | |

| Team | Category | Player | Statistics |
|---|---|---|---|
| Florida Atlantic | Passing | | |
| Florida Atlantic | Rushing | | |
| Florida Atlantic | Receiving | | |
| Tulsa | Passing | | |
| Tulsa | Rushing | | |
| Tulsa | Receiving | | |

=== South Florida ===
South Florida Bulls (6–4) at Florida Atlantic Owls (6–4) – Game summary

| Quarter | 1 | 2 | Total |
|---|---|---|---|
| Bulls | | | 0 |
| Owls | | | 0 |

at Flagler Credit Union Stadium • Boca Raton, Florida

- Date: November 21
- Game time: TBD

| Statistics | USF | FAU |
|---|---|---|
| First downs | | |
| Plays–yards | | |
| Rushes–yards | | |
| Passing yards | | |
| Passing: comp–att–int | | |
| Time of possession | | |

| Team | Category | Player | Statistics |
|---|---|---|---|
| South Florida | Passing | | |
| South Florida | Rushing | | |
| South Florida | Receiving | | |
| Florida Atlantic | Passing | | |
| Florida Atlantic | Rushing | | |
| Florida Atlantic | Receiving | | |

=== at East Carolina ===
Florida Atlantic Owls (7–4) at East Carolina Pirates (7–4) – Game summary

| Quarter | 1 | 2 | Total |
|---|---|---|---|
| Owls | | | 0 |
| Pirates | | | 0 |

at Dowdy–Ficklen Stadium • Greenville, North Carolina

- Date: November 27 or 28
- Game time: TBD

| Statistics | FAU | ECU |
|---|---|---|
| First downs | | |
| Plays–yards | | |
| Rushes–yards | | |
| Passing yards | | |
| Passing: comp–att–int | | |
| Time of possession | | |

| Team | Category | Player | Statistics |
|---|---|---|---|
| Florida Atlantic | Passing | | |
| Florida Atlantic | Rushing | | |
| Florida Atlantic | Receiving | | |
| East Carolina | Passing | | |
| East Carolina | Rushing | | |
| East Carolina | Receiving | | |

== Personnel ==
=== Roster ===
2026 Florida Atlantic Owls football team roster
Players
Coaches
Offense

| Pos. | # | Name | Class |
|---|---|---|---|
| WR | 0 | Branden Hoch | So |
| TE | 1 | AJ Johnson | GS |
| WR | 2 | Kelby Valsin | Sr |
| WR | 3 | Tucker Holloway | GS |
| WR | 4 | Antojuan Woody | Sr |
| RB | 5 | Leonard Farrow | GS |
| WR | 6 | RJ Garcia II | GS |
| QB | 7 | Jordan Magwood | So |
| WR | 8 | Easton Messer | GS |
| WR | 9 | Dominique Henry | GS |
| QB | 10 | Caden Veltkamp | GS |
| TE | 11 | Brooks Johnson | GS |
| QB | 12 | Jeremiah Daoud | Fr |
| WR | 13 | Jahmari Powell-Wonson | Jr |
| QB | 15 | Michael Valentino | Jr |
| WR | 16 | Elijah West | Fr |
| WR | 17 | Nicsaint Joseph Jr. | Fr |
| QB | 18 | Drew Devillier | Jr |
| RB | 21 | Ethan Ervin | So |
| RB | 22 | Brady Tillman III | Sr |
| WR | 26 | Chase Hanning | Sr |
| RB | 28 | Kaden Shields-Dutton | Jr |
| RB | 33 | Almari Brown | Jr |
| RB | 34 | Germanuel Tanelus | GS |
| OL | 50 | Owen Cheatham | Fr |
| OL | 51 | Aedyn Buchanan | Fr |
| OL | 52 | Logan Husband | So |
| OL | 55 | Rain Banick | So |
| OL | 57 | Ja'Kavion Nonar | GS |
| OL | 58 | Aiden Jones | Jr |
| OL | 60 | Aqil Meredith-Smith | So |
| OL | 62 | Vincent Fiacable | GS |
| OL | 63 | JJ Rochford | Fr |
| OL | 64 | Vincent Forney | Jr |
| OL | 65 | Braden Cunningham | Jr |
| OL | 67 | Alejandro Schmitt | Fr |
| OL | 70 | Jaylen Gamble | So |
| OL | 71 | Landon Rapkiewicz | So |
| OL | 72 | Ovie Dubre | Sr |
| OL | 73 | Kortez Winslow | Sr |
| OL | 74 | Ben Galloway | Sr |
| OL | 75 | Mauricio Hinds | Jr |
| OL | 76 | Aiden Ford | So |
| OL | 77 | Keon Rohé | Jr |
| OL | 78 | Carson Osmus | Jr |
| WR | 80 | Grayson Gibson | Fr |
| WR | 81 | Dyson Sims | Jr |
| WR | 82 | Dveyoun Bonwell-Witte | Fr |
| WR | 83 | Spencer Martin | Fr |
| TE | 86 | Owen Pollock | Fr |
| TE | 87 | Peter Cannon | Fr |
| TE | 88 | Marcus Vinson | GS |
| TE | 93 | Maika Kurkowski | So |

Defense

| Pos. | # | Name | Class |
|---|---|---|---|
| DB | 0 | Damon Allen | So |
| DL | 1 | CJ Doggette Jr. | GS |
| DL | 2 | Wilky Denaud | Sr |
| DB | 3 | Derrick Rogers | Sr |
| DB | 4 | Damarius McGhee | GS |
| EDGE | 5 | Deshaun Batiste | Sr |
| LB | 6 | Leon Hart Jr. | GS |
| LB | 7 | Khmari Johnson | Sr |
| CB | 8 | Chris Tooley III | Sr |
| EDGE | 9 | Jonathan Bax | Sr |
| EDGE | 10 | Josh Roberts | So |
| EDGE | 11 | Gavench Marcelin | Jr |
| EDGE | 12 | Jay Crable | Sr |
| DT | 13 | Earl Miller Jr. | GS |
| DL | 14 | Tycoolhill Luman | Jr |
| EDGE | 15 | Tyclean Luman | Jr |
| DB | 16 | Wallace Foster IV | Jr |
| LB | 17 | Char'Quez Lee | Jr |
| EDGE | 18 | Jackson Forte | Sr |
| LB | 18 | Joseph Sipp Jr. | GS |
| DB | 19 | Tyson Rooks | GS |
| DB | 20 | Bo Simpson-Nealy | Sr |
| LB | 21 | Nate Fischer | Jr |
| S | 22 | Jayden Sweeney | GS |
| DB | 23 | JK Johnson | GS |
| DB | 24 | Ahlston Ware | Sr |
| DB | 25 | Kam Herring | Jr |
| DB | 26 | Amar Reynolds | Jr |
| DB | 27 | Travis Jackson | Fr |
| LB | 28 | Zyere Horton | GS |
| DB | 30 | Justin Weatherall | Fr |
| EDGE | 31 | Kenyon Garner | Jr |
| DB | 32 | Sean Williams | Fr |
| DB | 33 | Ja'Cari Jackson | Fr |
| DB | 34 | Brenden Guidroz | Fr |
| LB | 35 | Tito Nunez | Jr |
| DB | 36 | Darius Smith | So |
| DB | 37 | Ethan Bruehl Gonzalez | Sr |
| DB | 38 | Christopher Tank Jr. | Fr |
| DB | 39 | RJ Lampkin | Sr |
| LB | 40 | Josiah Farmer | So |
| LB | 42 | Larry Spring | Fr |
| LB | 43 | Hector Chavez | So |
| EDGE | 44 | Roman Garcia IV | Sr |
| DB | 45 | Thomas Jackson | Jr |
| EDGE | 55 | Alexander Kocher | GS |
| DL | 56 | Gabriel Birnbaum | Jr |
| DL | 62 | Enyce Sledge | GS |
| EDGE | 89 | Nick Toussaint | Sr |
| DL | 91 | Lebron Edmond | Jr |
| DL | 94 | Corey Clark | GS |
| DL | 95 | Nimari Brantley | So |
| DL | 97 | Samuel Benoit | So |
| DL | 98 | Blake Burris | GS |
| DL | 99 | Nate Lovelace | Fr |

Special teams

| Pos. | # | Name | Class |
|---|---|---|---|
| K | 41 | Collin Rogers | GS |
| P | 49 | Alex Grace | Jr |
| LS | 54 | Walker Adkinson | GS |
| LS | 56 | Blake Thomas | Fr |
| P | 91 | Reed Chandley | Jr |
| K | 96 | Lliam Peterson | So |

Head coach

- Zach Kittley

Coordinators/assistant coaches

- Brett Dewhurst – Defensive Coordinator
- Tyler Schovanec – Special Teams Coordinator
- Chris Perkins – Running Backs
- Jajuan Dulaney – Tight Ends
- Stephen Hamby – Offensive Line
- Devin Santana – Defensive Tackles / Run Game Coordinator
- Brandon Lacy – Ends / Rush
- Antonio Fenelus – Defensive Backs
- Aaron Schwanz – Inside Linebackers
- Trent Vasey – Wide Receiver Coach
- Harrison Hanna – Football Chief of Staff
- Taylor Brown – Executive Director of Player Personnel
- Cris Carter – Executive Director of Player Engagement
- David Draper – Director of Football Operations
- Matt Wiesner – Director of Scouting / NFL Liaison
- Shane Marinelli – Assistant Director Player Personnel / High School Relations
- Faith Padgett – Director of Recruiting
- Margot Kessler – Assistant Director of Operations and Recruiting / Assistant to the Head Coach
- Dillon Coletto – Director of Video & Technology
- Joshua Geller – Assistant Director of Video & Technology
- Dylan Heinen – Director of Football Creative
- Brandon Lee – Head Strength and Conditioning Coach
- Bryson Breeding – Associate Head Strength and Conditioning Coach
- Xavier Dampeer – Assistant Strength and Conditioning Coach
- Patrick Goodwin – Director of Football Performance Nutrition
- Farrah Chojnacki – Assistant Director of Football Performance Nutrition
- Colin Spencer – Assistant Outside Linebacker / Edge Coach
- Korel Smith – Nickel Coach
- Kosi Eldridge – Assistant Inside Linebacker Coach
- Cagen Clark – Assistant Wide Receivers Coach
- Christian Clark – Defensive Graduate Assistant (DL)
- Gavin Cook – Defensive Graduate Assistant (DB)
- Mike Csaszar – Special Teams Graduate Assistant
- Braylon Jones – Offensive Graduate Assistant (OL)
- Bill Sanders – Head Athletic Trainer (Football)
- Brad Marsic – Associate Athletic Trainer (Football) and Director of Rehabilitation
- Ciara Celestino – Assistant Athletic Trainer (Football)
- Raleigh Illig – Assistant Athletic Trainer (Football)
- Madelyn Kalady – Assistant Athletic Trainer (Football)
- Anthony Fortier – Assistant AD/Equipment Operations and Logistics
- Elisabeth Flores – Assistant Football Equipment Manager
- Cliff McCray – Team Chaplain

Legend

- (C) Team captain
- (S) Suspended
- (I) Ineligible
- Injured
- Redshirt

Roster

=== Transfers ===
==== Outgoing ====
| Player | Position | Destination |

==== Incoming ====
| Player | Position | Previous school |

=== Coaching staff additions ===
| Name | New position | Previous team | Previous position |
