= 2024 American Athletic Conference Football Championship Game =

- 10th AAC Championship Game
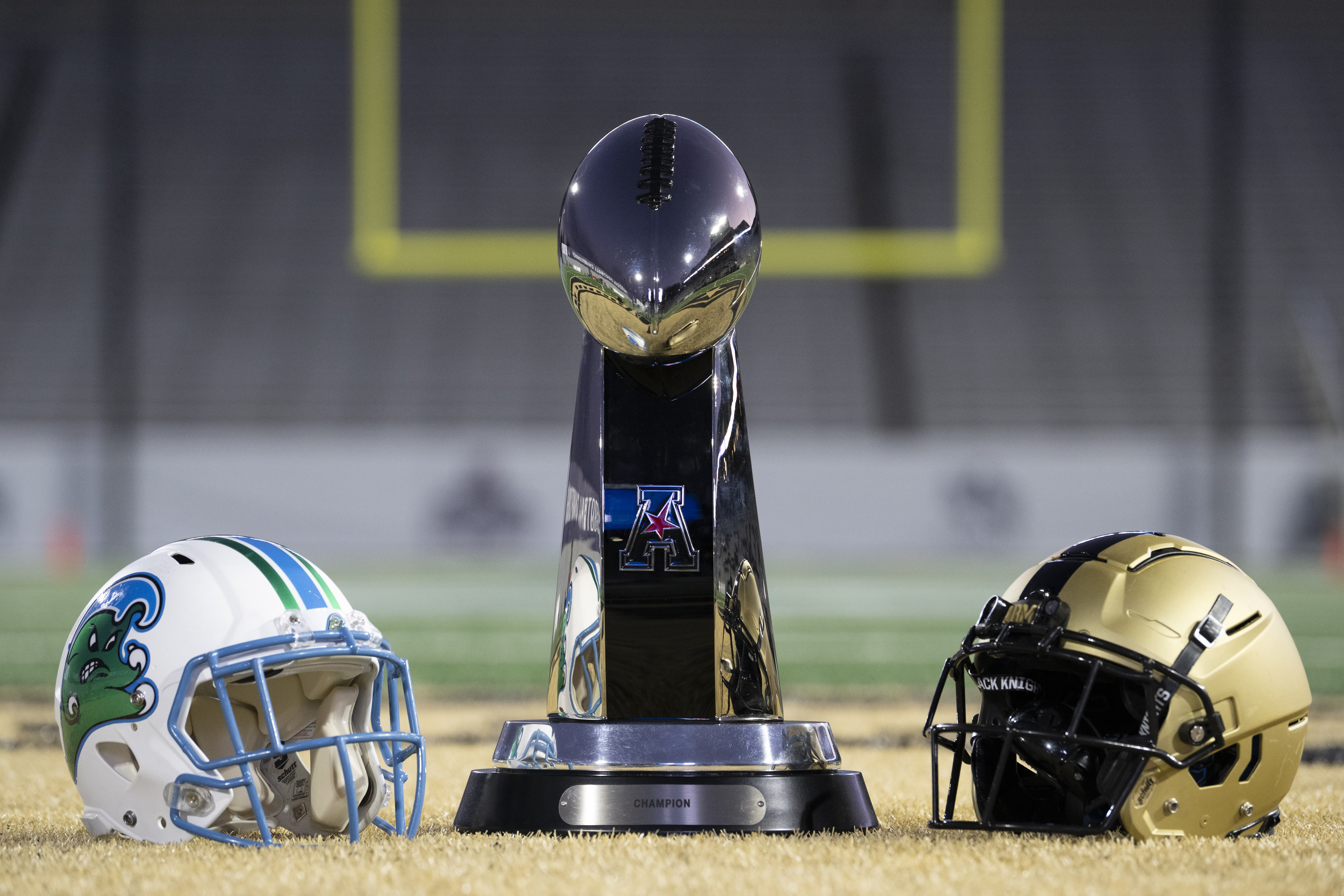
- The championship trophy on Blaik Field before the game
Tulane Green Wave	Army Black Knights
(9–3)	(10–1)
14	35
Head coach: Jon Sumrall	Head coach: Jeff Monken
	AP / Coaches / CFP; 24 / 23 / 24
	1	2	3	4	Total
Tulane	0	7	0	7	14
Army	7	14	7	7	35
- Date: December 6, 2024
- Season: 2024
- Stadium: Michie Stadium
- Location: West Point, New York
- MVP: Bryson Daily, QB, Army
- Favorite: Tulane by 4
- Referee: Tim Rich
- Attendance: 14,016

United States TV coverage
- Network: ABC; ESPN Radio
- Announcers: ABC: Dave Pasch (play-by-play), Dusty Dvoracek (analyst), and Taylor McGregor (sideline reporter); ESPN Radio: Sean Kelley (play-by-play), Kelly Stouffer (analyst), and Ian Fitzsimmons (sideline reporter)

2024 American Athletic Conference football standings
	Conf.			Overall
Team	W		L	W		L
No. 21 Army y$	8	–	0	12	–	2
Tulane y	7	–	1	9	–	5
Navy	6	–	2	10	–	3
No. 24 Memphis	6	–	2	11	–	2
East Carolina	5	–	3	8	–	5
South Florida	4	–	4	7	–	6
UTSA	4	–	4	7	–	6
Charlotte	4	–	4	5	–	7
North Texas	3	–	5	6	–	7
Rice	3	–	5	4	–	8
Temple	2	–	6	3	–	9
UAB	2	–	6	3	–	9
Florida Atlantic	1	–	7	3	–	9
Tulsa	1	–	7	3	–	9
Championship: Army 35, Tulane 14
$ – Conference champion; y – Championship game participant; Rankings from AP Poll

The 2024 American Athletic Conference Football Championship Game was a college football game played on December 6, 2024 to determine the champion of the American Athletic Conference (The American) for the 2024 season. It was the tenth American Athletic Conference Football Championship Game. The game was scheduled to start at 8:00 p.m. EST and air on ABC. The game featured the Tulane Green Wave against the Army Black Knights. Army defeated Tulane 35-14 for its first conference championship in program history.

According to ESPN, the Black Knights' feat of no penalties, turnovers, or punts in the game was the first such performance by an FBS team in at least 20 years.

This was the last championship game played under the "American Athletic Conference" name. On July 21, 2025, the conference dropped the word "Athletic" from its name, becoming the American Conference.

== Teams ==
The 2024 American Conference Championship Game featured the Tulane Green Wave and the Army Black Knights. This was the third consecutive American title game appearance for Tulane and its third overall. This was the first American title game appearance for Army, which was in its first season in The American.

The site of the game was determined during the final week of the conference season. (Note: Army has one regular-season game remaining, namely its annual rivalry game against fellow American Conference football affiliate Navy on December 14. However, as part of the agreement by which Army became a football member of the conference, the Army–Navy Game is designated as a non-conference game.) Tulane's loss to Memphis on November 28, combined with Army's win over UTSA two days later, gave Army the outright regular-season title and hosting rights.

This was the 24th meeting between Tulane and Army; going into the game, the Green Wave led the all-time series 13-9-1.

=== Tulane Green Wave ===
Tulane clinched a spot in the game following its win over Navy on November 16.

=== Army Black Knights ===
Army clinched a spot in the game on November 16, one week after its win over North Texas.

=== Scoring summary ===
2024 American Athletic Conference Championship Game
Tulane Green Wave (9–3, 7–1) vs. No. 24 Army Black Knights (11–1, 8–0)

Quarter	1	2	3	4	Total
Tulane	0	7	0	7	14
No. 24 Army	7	14	7	7	35

at Michie Stadium • West Point, NY

- Date: Saturday, December 6, 2024
- Game time: 8:00 p.m. EST
- Game weather: Temperature: 27 °F (−3 °C) • Wind: W at 7 miles per hour (11 km/h) • Weather: Fair
- Referee: Tim Rich
- TV announcers (ABC): Dave Pasch (play-by-play), Dusty Dvoracek (analyst), and Taylor McGregor (sideline reporter)
  ESPN Radio: Sean Kelley (play-by-play), Kelly Stouffer (analyst), and Ian Fitzsimmons (sideline reporter)

Game information

First Quarter

- (3:48) ARMY – Bryson Daily 5 yard rush, Trey Gronotte kick (Drive: 11 plays, 72 yards, 6:36; Army 7–0)

Second Quarter

- (10:18) ARMY – Bryson Daily 3 yard rush, Trey Gronotte kick ('Drive: 3 plays, 80 yards, 1:26; Army 14–0)
- (1:40) ARMY – Bryson Daily 4 yard rush, Trey Gronotte kick ('Drive: 5 plays, 21 yards, 1:00; Army 21–0)
- (0:44) TULN – Mario Williams 42 yard pass from Darian Mensah, Patrick Durkin kick ('Drive: 4 plays, 60 yards, 0:52; Army 21–7)

Third Quarter

- (8:29) ARMY – Bryson Daily 7 yard rush, Trey Gronotte kick ('Drive: 11 plays, 75 yards, 6:31; Army 28–7)

Fourth Quarter

- (6:29) ARMY – Kanye Udoh 1 yard rush, Trey Gronotte kick ('Drive: 16 plays, 84 yards, 10:44; Army 35–7)
- (1:10) TULN – Alex Bauman 2 yard pass from Darian Mensah, Patrick Durkin kick ('Drive: 16 plays, 80 yards, 5:13; Army 35–14)

Statistics	TULN	ARMY
First downs	17	20
Plays–yards	54–324	59–352
Rushes–yards	29–115	57–335
Passing yards	209	17
Passing: comp–att–int	17–25–1	2–2–0
Time of possession	25:40	34:20

Team	Category	Player	Statistics
Tulane	Passing	Darian Mensah	17/25, 209 yards, 2 TD, INT
Tulane	Rushing	Makhi Hughes	14 carries, 66 yards
Tulane	Receiving	Mario Williams	6 receptions, 109 yards, TD
Army	Passing	Bryson Daily	2/2, 17 yards
Army	Rushing	Kanye Udoh	20 carries, 158 yards, TD
Army	Receiving	Casey Reynolds	1 reception, 9 yards
