= Sean Saturnio =

American football coach (born 1967)

Current position
- Title: Associate Head Coach/Special Teams Coordinator
- Team: Army
- Conference: The American

Biographical details
- Born: June 30, 1967 (age 59); Hilo, Hawai'i, U.S.
- Education: University of Hawaiʻi at Mānoa (1992)

Playing career
- 1985–1986: Beloit
- 1987–1988: Hawai'i
- Position: Wide receiver

Coaching career (HC unless noted)
- 2000: Waipahu HS (Varsity assistant)
- 2001: Waipahu HS (JV Coach)
- 2002–2010: Waipahu HS
- 2012–2013: Georgia Southern (TE)
- 2014–2015: Army (FB)
- 2016–2017: Army (TE/ST)
- 2018–2019: Army (TE)
- 2020–2025: Army (ST)
- 2026–present: Army (AHC/ST)

Administrative career (AD unless noted)
- 2011: Georgia Southern (director of player development)

Accomplishments and honors

Awards
- AFCA Assistant Coach of the Year (2024); First Staff All-American (2023); OIA Division I Coach of the Year (2008); OIA Division II Coach of the Year (2004)

Sean Saturnio (born June 30, 1967) is an American football coach who is currently the special teams coordinator for the Army Black Knights.

== Coaching career ==
=== Waipahu HS ===
Saturnio spent over a decade at Waipahu High School in Waipahu, Hawai'i, serving as head coach from 2002 to 2010. The team qualified for the playoffs in six of ten seasons. He was named the Oahu Interscholastic Association (OIA) Division I Coach of the Year in 2008 and Division II Coach of the Year in 2004.

=== Georgia Southern ===
In 2011, Saturnio joined Georgia Southern as the Director of Player Development. He transitioned to coaching tight ends and assisting with the offensive line in 2012. During his tenure, the team made two consecutive NCAA FCS Semifinal appearances.

=== Army ===
Saturnio joined the Army Black Knights coaching staff in 2014 as the fullbacks coach. He later served as the tight ends coach from 2018 to 2019 and has been the special teams coordinator since 2020.

In 2024, the unit blocked multiple punts resulting in touchdowns and set a program record with 57 successful PATs in a season. Following the 2024 season, Saturnio was named the AFCA Assistant Coach of the Year.

== Personal life ==
Saturnio graduated from the University of Hawai'i with a degree in Elementary Education and a minor in Hawaiian Studies in 1992. In 2014, he married his wife, Sharon. They have four children.
