= Cody Worley =

American football player and coach

Cody Worley is an American football coach and former quarterback, who is currently the offensive coordinator for the Army Black Knights. He is the incoming head coach for the Furman Paladins.

== Early life and playing career ==
Worley attended Calhoun High School in Calhoun, Georgia, where he played quarterback. He played college football for the Furman Paladins from 2007 to 2010. As a starter in 2010, Worley threw for 1,496 yards and accounted for 19 touchdowns.

== Coaching career ==
Worley got his first coaching job in 2011 as an offensive quality control coach for The Citadel. Heading into the 2013 season, he was promoted to quarterbacks coach. In 2014, Worley joined Kennesaw State as quarterbacks coach. In 2020, he was hired as the quarterbacks coach at Army. Ahead of the 2024 season, Worley was promoted to serve as the team's offensive coordinator. On November 17, 2026, Worley was named as the next head coach for the Furman Paladins.
