= 2024 Tulane Green Wave football team =

American college football season

2024 Tulane Green Wave football

AAC Championship Game, L 14–35 vs Army

Gasparilla Bowl, L 8–33 vs. Florida
- Conference: American Athletic Conference
- Record: 9–5 (7–1 AAC)
- Head coach: Jon Sumrall (1st season)
- Offensive coordinator: Joe Craddock (1st season)
- Co-offensive coordinator: Evan McKissack (1st season)
- Offensive scheme: West Coast
- Defensive coordinator: Greg Gasparato (1st season)
- Co-defensive coordinator: Tayler Polk (1st season)
- Base defense: 4–2–5
- Home stadium: Yulman Stadium

2024 American Athletic Conference football standings
	Conf.			Overall
Team	W		L	W		L
No. 21 Army y$	8	–	0	12	–	2
Tulane y	7	–	1	9	–	5
Navy	6	–	2	10	–	3
No. 24 Memphis	6	–	2	11	–	2
East Carolina	5	–	3	8	–	5
South Florida	4	–	4	7	–	6
UTSA	4	–	4	7	–	6
Charlotte	4	–	4	5	–	7
North Texas	3	–	5	6	–	7
Rice	3	–	5	4	–	8
Temple	2	–	6	3	–	9
UAB	2	–	6	3	–	9
Florida Atlantic	1	–	7	3	–	9
Tulsa	1	–	7	3	–	9
Championship: Army 35, Tulane 14
$ – Conference champion; y – Championship game participant; Rankings from AP Poll

The 2024 Tulane Green Wave football team represented Tulane University in the American Athletic Conference (AAC) during the 2024 NCAA Division I FBS football season. The Green Wave were led by Jon Sumrall in his first year as the head coach. The Green Wave played their home games at Yulman Stadium, located in New Orleans.

== Offseason ==
=== Transfers ===
Outgoing
Player	Position	Destination
Phat Watts	WR	Withdrawn
Carson Haggard	QB	Abilene Christian
Chris Brazzell II	WR	Tennessee
D.J. Douglas	CB	Florida
Devean Deal	DL	TCU
Kentrell Webb	CB	Houston
Kai Horton	QB	Withdrawn
Corey Platt Jr.	LB	Houston
Keith Cooper Jr.	DL	Houston
Alex Bauman	TE	Withdrawn
Iverson Celestine	RB	South Alabama
Hunter Summers	WR	Arkansas State
AJ Thomas	EDGE	McNeese
Jai Eugene Jr.	S	Western Kentucky
Noah Gardner	OT	Missouri State
RJ Whitehead	IOL	UTEP
Taylor Love	LB	Tennessee Tech
Jalen Rogers	WR	Florida A&M
Lajuan Owens	IOL	New Mexico
Sully Burns	OT	Texas State
Maxie Baudoin IV	DL	Louisiana
Chadwick Bailey	CB	Bentley
Isaiah Boyd	DL	Albany
Pierson Parent	LS	Houston
Jared Small	LB	Arizona
Terez Traynor	WR	Charlotte
Yash Gupta	WR	Amherst
Kiland Harrison	CB	TBD
Gabe Liu	CB	TBD
DK McGruder	CB	TBD
Tyrek Presley	WR	TBD

Incoming
Player	Position	Previous School
Jalen Geiger	S	Kentucky
Lucius Tillery	CB	Louisiana–Monroe
Jaylon Griffin	WR	UCF
Ty Thompson	QB	Oregon
Micah Robinson	CB	Furman
Chris Rodgers	LB	Troy
Jack Tchienchou	CB	Troy
Terez Traynor	WR	Idaho
Mario Williams	WR	USC
Deshaun Batiste	DL	Troy
Caleb Ransaw	CB	Troy
Shazz Preston	WR	Alabama
Vincent Murphy	C	Western Kentucky
Ronan Chambers	OT	Akron
Khai Prean	WR	LSU
Johnathan Edwards	CB	Indiana State
Derrick Graham	IOL	Texas A&M
Sidney Mbanasor	WR	Utah
Anthony Miller	TE	Indiana
Terrell Allen	DL	Tennessee State
Jacob Barnes	K	Louisiana Tech
Gabe Fortson	IOL	Georgia Tech
Jaylon Griffin	WR	UCF
Sam Howard	LB	Austin Peay
Adin Huntington	DL	Louisiana–Monroe
Javon Carter	DL	Grambling State

== Schedule ==
Date	Time	Opponent	Rank	Site	TV	Result	Attendance
August 29	7:00 p.m.	Southeastern Louisiana*		Yulman Stadium; New Orleans, LA	ESPN+	W 52–0	20,143
September 7	11:00 a.m.	No. 17 Kansas State*		Yulman Stadium; New Orleans, LA	ESPN	L 27–34	25,034
September 14	2:30 p.m.	at No. 15 Oklahoma*		Gaylord Family Oklahoma Memorial Stadium; Norman, OK	ESPN	L 19–34	83,325
September 21	11:00 a.m.	at Louisiana*		Cajun Field; Lafayette, LA	ESPNU	W 41–33	22,534
September 28	11:00 a.m.	South Florida		Yulman Stadium; New Orleans, LA	ESPNU	W 45–10	20,783
October 5	12:00 p.m.	at UAB		Protective Stadium; Birmingham, AL	ESPN+	W 71–20	19,724
October 19	2:30 p.m.	Rice		Yulman Stadium; New Orleans, LA	ESPN+	W 24–10	22,897
October 26	11:00 a.m.	at North Texas		DATCU Stadium; Denton, TX	ESPN2	W 45–37	23,138
October 31	6:30 p.m.	at Charlotte		Jerry Richardson Stadium; Charlotte, NC	ESPN	W 34–3	12,268
November 9	3:00 p.m.	Temple^{†}		Yulman Stadium; New Orleans, LA	ESPNU	W 52–6	30,000
November 16	11:00 a.m.	at Navy	No. 25	Navy–Marine Corps Memorial Stadium; Annapolis, MD	ESPN2	W 35–0	38,914
November 28	6:30 p.m.	Memphis	No. 17	Yulman Stadium; New Orleans, LA	ESPN	L 24–34	25,021
December 6	7:00 p.m.	at No. 24 Army		Michie Stadium; West Point, NY (AAC Championship Game)	ABC	L 14–35	14,016
December 20	2:30 p.m.	vs. Florida*		Raymond James Stadium; Tampa, FL (Gasparilla Bowl)	ESPN2	L 8–33	41,472
*Non-conference game; ^{†}Homecoming; Rankings from AP Poll - Released prior to game; All times are in Central time

== Roster ==
2024 Tulane Green Wave football team roster
Players
Coaches
Offense

Pos.	#	Name	Class
WR	1	Dontae Fleming	Sr
RB	2	Shaadie Clayton-Johnson	Sr
WR	3	Phat Watts	GS
WR	4	Mario Williams	Jr
WR	5	Yulkeith Brown	Sr
WR	6	Shazz Preston	So
QB	7	Ty Thompson	Jr
QB	8	Kellen Tasby	Fr
TE	9	Reggie Brown	Sr
QB	10	Darian Mensah	Fr
WR	11	Sidney Mbanasor	Fr
QB	12	Kai Horton	Jr
QB	13	Jakson Judge	Fr
QB	14	Dagan Bruno	Fr
WR	15	Zycarl Lewis Jr.	Fr
QB	16	Garrett Mmahat	So
WR	17	Khai Prean	Fr
WR	19	Shaun Nicholas	Fr
RB	20	Arnold Barnes III	So
RB	21	Makhi Hughes	So
WR	22	Alex Wigginton	So
RB	24	Trey Cornist	So
RB	25	Jamauri McClure	Fr
WR	26	Walker Davis	Fr
RB	27	Chase Rudin	Fr
WR	28	Seth Gale	Fr
WR	39	Trevor Evans	Jr
RB	40	George Arata	So
TE	45	Jackson Stewart	Fr
RB	46	Tate Jernigan	Sr
TE	48	Jonathan Kahn	Jr
OL	52	Tristen Fortenberry	Fr
OL	55	Dominic Steward	Fr
OL	56	Shadre Hurst	So
OL	58	Caleb Thomas	Sr
OL	60	Jaxon Ducre	Fr
OL	61	Leo Wulffraat	Fr
OL	62	Gabe Fortson	Fr
OL	64	Vincent Murphy	GS
OL	68	Josh Remetich	Sr
OL	69	Rashad Green	Sr
OL	71	Jayce Mitchell	Fr
OL	72	Trey Tuggle	Jr
OL	73	Elijah Baker	Fr
OL	74	Landry Cannon	So
OL	75	Colin O'Carroll	Fr
OL	76	Derrick Graham	Jr
OL	77	Darion Reed	So
OL	78	Reese Baker	Fr
TE	80	Joshua Goines	Fr
WR	81	Luke Besh	Jr
OL	82	Erik Urbaniak	Fr
WR	83	Bryce Bohanon	Jr
WR	84	Lucas Desjardins	Jr
TE	85	Antony Miller	Fr
TE	86	Guiseann Mirtil	Fr
TE	87	Alex Bauman	Jr
TE	88	Blake Gunter	So
TE	89	DJ Cicero	Fr

Defense

Pos.	#	Name	Class
DL	0	Patrick Jenkins	Sr
S	2	Jalen Geiger	GS
LB	4	Chris Rodgers	So
DB	5	Rayshawn Pleasant	So
DB	6	Micah Robinson	Jr
SPR	7	Caleb Ransaw	Jr
DB	8	Johnathan Edwards	Sr
BAN	9	Terrell Allen	Sr
DB	10	Lu Tillery	Jr
DB	11	E'zaiah Shine	Fr
SPR	12	Javion White	Fr
LB	13	Tyler Grubbs	Sr
DB	14	Armani Cargo	Fr
LB	15	Sam Howard	Jr
DB	20	Jahiem Johnson	So
DB	21	Jayden Lewis	Fr
DB	23	Kevin Adams III	So
SPR	26	Shi'Keem Laister	Sr
S	27	Chase Green	Fr
LB	28	Dickson Agu	So
S	29	Jack Tchienchou	Fr
DB	30	Joshua Moore	So
S	31	Carson Klein	Fr
S	32	Bailey Despanie	Jr
DB	33	Rodrek Williams II	Jr
DE	35	Matthew Fobbs-White	So
LB	36	Mandel Eugene Jr.	Jr
LB	37	Harold Lawson	So
S	38	Jared Moorer	Jr
CB	39	Brandon Kim	Jr
LB	41	Makai Williams	So
LB	42	Jean Claude Joseph III	So
SPR	43	Rishi Rattan	Jr
BAN	44	Michael Lunz	Jr
DL	45	Adin Huntington	Sr
BAN	48	Michael Guruli	Fr
BAN	48	Jah'rie Garner	So
BAN	50	Bryce Boutte	Fr
DL	51	Jack Stivers	So
LB	54	Adam Uppuluri	Jr
BAN	59	Dante De Rosa	Jr
DL	70	Kameron Hamilton	Jr
DE	91	Deshaun Batiste	Fr
DE	92	Gerrod Henderson	So
NT	93	Elijah Champaigne	Jr
NT	94	Eric Hicks Jr.	Sr
NT	95	Adonis Friloux	Jr
DL	96	Geordan Guidry	Fr
BAN	97	Javon Carter	Sr
DL	98	Parker Petersen	Jr
LB	99	Jesus Machado	Sr

Special teams

Pos.	#	Name	Class
P	34	William Hudlow	So
K	35	Jacob Barnes	Sr
P	49	Will Karoll	So
K/P	53	Bobby Noel	Jr
LS	57	Ethan Hudak	Sr
P	62	Brice Busch	So
K	63	Ethan Head	Fr
LS	65	Andrew Goodman	So
LS	70	Thomas Peterson	Sr
K	90	Zach Marini	Fr
K	91	Patrick Durkin	Fr
P	92	Ethan Greenberg	So

Head coach

- Jon Sumrall

Coordinators/assistant coaches

- Joe Craddock – Offensive coordinator/quarterbacks
- Greg Gasparato – Defensive coordinator/safeties
- Evan McKissack – Co-offensive coordinator/offensive line
- Tayler Polk – Co-defensive coordinator/inside linebackers
- Bam Hardmon – Run game coordinator/outside linebackers
- Brock Hays – Running backs
- J. J. McCleskey – Defensive backs
- Dan Roushar – Offensive line
- Carter Sheridan – Wide receivers
- Greg McMahon – Special teams coordinator
- Landius Wilkerson – Defensive line
- Tyler Spotts-Orgeron – Offensive analyst/tight ends coach
- Collin D'Angelo – Offensive analyst/quarterbacks coach
- Brayden Berezowitz – Defensive analyst/spears and nickels coach
- Rob Greene – Defensive analyst/safeties coach
- Gunner Hudspeth – Analyst/assistant special teams coach
- Byron Ellis – Chief of Staff
- Cole Heard – General Manager
- Jeremiah Cartwright – Director, football operations
- Derick Bugg – Director, player development
- Rusty Whitt – Director, strength and conditioning
- Colin Kenyon – Assistant, strength and conditioning
- Nick Bell – Assistant, strength and conditioning
- Jonathan Davis – Assistant, strength and conditioning
- Rodney Saulsberry – Graduate assistant
- Peter Hontas – Graduate assistant
- Justin Herrup – Graduate assistant
- Tyler Kelley – Graduate assistant
- Logan Self – Graduate assistant
- Chris Wurl – Graduate assistant

Legend

- (C) Team captain
- (S) Suspended
- (I) Ineligible
- Injured
- Redshirt

Roster
Last update: 9/30/24

== Game summaries ==
=== Southeastern Louisiana (FCS) ===
Southeastern Louisiana Lions (FCS) (0–0) at Tulane Green Wave (0–0) – Game summary

Quarter	1	2	3	4	Total
Lions (FCS)	0	0	0	0	0
Green Wave	7	14	14	17	52

at Yulman Stadium • New Orleans, Louisiana

- Date: August 29th
- Game time: 7:00 p.m. CDT
- Game weather: Rain • Temperature: 80 °F (27 °C) • Wind: SE at 6 miles per hour (9.7 km/h)
- Game attendance: 20,143
- Referee: Darryl DeBerry
- TV announcers (ESPN+): Doug Sherman (play-by-play), Tyoka Jackson (analyst)

Game information

First quarter

- (3:30) TUL – Yulkeith Brown 11 yard pass from Darian Mensah, Jacob Barnes kick (Drive: 11 plays, 75 yards, 5:59; Tulane 7–0)

Second quarter

- (9:45) TUL – Makhi Hughes 2 yard run, Jacob Barnes kick (Drive: 10 plays, 72 yards, 5:10; Tulane 14–0)
- (0:42) TUL – Rayshawn Pleasant 100 yard interception return, Jacob Barnes kick (Tulane 21–0)

Third quarter

- (11:20) TUL – Ty Thompson 8 yard run, Jacob Barnes kick (Drive: 7 plays, 75 yards, 3:40; Tulane 28–0)
- (3:40) TUL – Arnold Barnes III 1 yard run, Jacob Barnes kick (Drive: 6 plays, 57 yards, 2:59; Tulane 35–0)

Fourth quarter

- (14:54) TUL – Alex Bauman 12 yard pass from Darian Mensah, Jacob Barnes kick (Drive: 3 plays, 85 yards, 1:11; Tulane 42–0)
- (10:02) TUL – Ty Thompson 4 yard run, Jacob Barnes kick (Drive: 6 plays, 47 yards, 3:33; Tulane 49–0)
- (2:06) TUL – Jacob Barnes 38 yard field goal (Drive: 11 plays, 67 yards, 5:37; Tulane 52–0)

Statistics	SELA	TULN
First downs	14	25
Plays–yards	53–201	56–472
Rushes–yards	32–102	39–241
Passing yards	99	231
Passing: Comp–Att–Int	14–21–1	13–17–0
Time of possession	29:47	30:13

Team	Category	Player	Statistics
Southeastern Louisiana	Passing	Eli Sawyer	14/19, 99 yards, 1 INT
Southeastern Louisiana	Rushing	Antonio Martin Jr.	13 carries, 68 yards
Southeastern Louisiana	Receiving	Darius Lewis	5 receptions, 44 yards
Tulane	Passing	Darian Mensah	10/12, 205 yards, 2 TD
Tulane	Rushing	Makhi Hughes	14 carries, 59 yards, 1 TD
Tulane	Receiving	Mario Williams	4 receptions, 124 yards

=== No. 17 Kansas State ===
No. 17 Kansas State Wildcats (1–0) at Tulane Green Wave (1–0) – Game summary

Quarter	1	2	3	4	Total
No. 17 Wildcats	3	7	10	14	34
Green Wave	7	13	0	7	27

at Yulman Stadium • New Orleans, Louisiana

- Date: September 7th
- Game time: 11:00 a.m. CDT
- Game weather: Cloudy • Temperature: 76 °F (24 °C) • Wind: NE at 11 miles per hour (18 km/h)
- Game attendance: 25,034
- Referee: Kevin Boitmann
- TV announcers (ESPN): Bob Wischusen (play-by-play), Louis Riddick (analyst), Kris Budden (sideline reporter)

Game information

First quarter

- (3:05) KSU – Chris Tennant 48 yard field goal (Drive: 12 plays, 58 yards, 5:59; Kansas State 3–0)
- (0:49) TUL – Makhi Hughes 3 yard run, Jacob Barnes kick (Drive: 5 plays, 73 yards, 2:09; Tulane 7–3)

Second quarter

- (13:17) TUL – Alex Bauman 36 yard pass from Darian Mensah, Jacob Barnes kick (Drive: 2 plays, 38 yards, 1:03; Tulane 14–3)
- (10:16) KSU – Will Swanson 7 yard pass from Avery Johnson, Chris Tennant kick (Drive: 6 plays, 75 yards, 3:04; Tulane 14–10)
- (4:57) TUL – Jacob Barnes 40 yard field goal (Drive: 11 plays, 57 yards, 5:12; Tulane 17–10)
- (1:01) TUL – Jacob Barnes 41 yard field goal (Drive: 7 plays, 45 yards, 2:44; Tulane 20–10)

Third quarter

- (7:49) KSU – Chris Tennant 28 yard field goal (Drive: 7 plays, 65 yards, 3:38; Tulane 20–13)
- (2:26) KSU – DJ Giddens 45 yard pass from Avery Johnson, Chris Tennant kick (Drive: 5 plays, 66 yards, 2:50; Tied 20–20)

Fourth quarter

- (14:01) TUL – Alex Bauman 13 yard pass from Darian Mensah, Jacob Barnes kick (Drive: 6 plays, 56 yards, 3:17; Tulane 27–20)
- (11:20) KSU – Dylan Edwards 13 yard run, Chris Tennant kick (Drive: 6 plays, 75 yards, 2:41; Tied 27–27)
- (8:13) KSU – Jack Fabris 60 yard fumble recovery, Chris Tennant kick (Kansas State 34–27)

Statistics	KSU	TULN
First downs	19	21
Plays–yards	56–396	66–491
Rushes–yards	33–215	37–149
Passing yards	181	342
Passing: Comp–Att–Int	15–23–0	19–29–1
Time of possession	26:44	33:11

Team	Category	Player	Statistics
Kansas State	Passing	Avery Johnson	15/23, 181 yards, 2 TD
Kansas State	Rushing	DJ Giddens	19 carries, 114 yards
Kansas State	Receiving	DJ Giddens	4 receptions, 63 yards, 1 TD
Tulane	Passing	Darian Mensah	19/29, 342 yards, 2 TD, 1 INT
Tulane	Rushing	Makhi Hughes	21 carries, 128 yards, 1 TD
Tulane	Receiving	Mario Williams	6 receptions, 128 yards

=== at No. 15 Oklahoma ===
Tulane Green Wave (1–1) at No. 15 Oklahoma Sooners (2–0) – Game summary

Quarter	1	2	3	4	Total
Green Wave	0	6	7	6	19
No. 15 Sooners	7	14	3	10	34

at Gaylord Family Oklahoma Memorial Stadium • Norman, Oklahoma

- Date: September 14th
- Game time: 2:30 p.m. CDT
- Game weather: Sunny • Temperature: 91 °F (33 °C) • Wind: SE at 10 miles per hour (16 km/h)
- Game attendance: 83,325
- Referee: Chris Lamertina
- TV announcers (ESPN): Dave Pasch (play-by-play), Dusty Dvoracek (analyst), Taylor McGregor (sideline reporter)

Game information

First quarter

- (7:36) OU – Jackson Arnold 1 yard run, Tyler Keltner kick (Drive: 14 plays, 69 yards, 5:46; Oklahoma 7–0)

Second quarter

- (10:02) OU – Taylor Tatum 9 yard pass from Jackson Arnold, Tyler Keltner kick (Drive: 7 plays, 60 yards, 1:58; Oklahoma 14–0)
- (3:39) OU – Taylor Tatum 1 yard run, Tyler Keltner kick (Drive: 6 plays, 67 yards, 1:36; Oklahoma 21–0)
- (0:19) TULN – Reggie Brown 7 yard pass from Ty Thompson, kick failed (Drive: 11 plays, 75 yards, 3:20; Oklahoma 21–6)

Third quarter

- (9:20) OU – Tyler Keltner 29 yard field goal (Drive: 13 plays, 64 yards, 5:40; Oklahoma 24–6)
- (4:45) TULN – Makhi Hughes 8 yard pass from Darian Mensah, Ethan Head kick (Drive: 9 plays, 75 yards, 4:35; Oklahoma 24–13)

Fourth quarter

- (14:20) TULN – Tyler Grubbs 22 yard interception return, 2-point pass failed (Oklahoma 24–19)
- (6:05) OU – Jackson Arnold 24 yard run, Tyler Keltner kick (Drive: 4 plays, 43 yards, 2:13; Oklahoma 31–19)
- (2:55) OU – Tyler Keltner 39 yard field goal (Drive: 4 plays, 5 yards, 1:39; Oklahoma 34–19)

Statistics	TULN	OU
First downs	16	23
Plays–yards	67–279	75–349
Rushes–yards	34–106	45–182
Passing yards	173	167
Passing: Comp–Att–Int	15–33–1	19–30–1
Time of possession	28:18	31:42

Team	Category	Player	Statistics
Tulane	Passing	Darian Mensah	14/32, 166 yards, 1 TD, 1 INT
Tulane	Rushing	Makhi Hughes	19 carries, 71 yards
Tulane	Receiving	Dontae Fleming	4 receptions, 59 yards
Oklahoma	Passing	Jackson Arnold	18/29, 169 yards, 1 TD, 1 INT
Oklahoma	Rushing	Jackson Arnold	14 carries, 97 yards, 2 TD
Oklahoma	Receiving	Deion Burks	7 receptions, 80 yards

=== at Louisiana ===
Tulane Green Wave (1–2) at Louisiana Ragin' Cajuns (2–0) – Game summary

Quarter	1	2	3	4	Total
Green Wave	0	17	21	3	41
Ragin' Cajuns	7	6	13	7	33

at Cajun Field • Lafayette, Louisiana

- Date: September 21st
- Game time: 11:00 a.m. CDT
- Game weather: Sunny • Temperature: 92 °F (33 °C) • Wind: SE at 4 miles per hour (6.4 km/h)
- Game attendance: 22,534
- Referee: Trennis Livingston
- TV announcers (ESPNU): Mike Corey (play-by-play) and Rene Ingoglia (analyst)

Game information

First quarter

- (7:26) UL – Ben Wooldridge 1-yard run, Kenneth Almendares kick (Drive: 7 plays, 79 yards, 3:53; Louisiana 7–0)

Second quarter

- (14:57) TUL – Ty Thompson 2-yard run, Ethan Head kick (Drive: 15 plays, 65 yards, 7:29; Tied 7–7)
- (9:14) ULL – Kenneth Almendares 20-yard field goal (Drive: 11 plays, 72 yards, 5:43; Louisiana 10–7)
- (2:02) TUL – Ethan Head 37-yard field goal (Drive: 13 plays, 59 yards, 7:08; Tied 10–10)
- (1:40) TUL – Jack Tchienchou 38-yard interception, Ethan Head kick (Tulane 17–10)
- (0:03) ULL – Kenneth Almendares 31-yard field goal (Drive: 12 plays, 61 yards, 1:37; Tulane 17–13)

Third quarter

- (14:47) TUL – Rayshawn Pleasant 94-yard kickoff return, Ethan Head kick (Tulane 24–13)
- (13:06) ULL – Caden Jensen 1-yard pass from Ben Wooldridge (Drive: 3 plays, 75 yards, 1:41; Tulane 24–19)
- (8:57) TUL – Reggie Brown 33-yard pass from Darian Mensah, Ethan Head kick (Drive: 8 plays, 73 yards, 4:05; Tulane 31–19)
- (6:42) ULL – Terrance Carter 36-yard pass from Ben Wooldridge, Kenneth Almendares kick (Drive: 4 plays, 72 yards, 2:04; Tulane 31–26)
- (3:11) TUL – Makhi Hughes 1-yard run, Ethan Head kick (Drive: 6 plays, 73 yards, 3:26; Tulane 38–26)

Fourth quarter

- (13:17) ULL – Ben Wooldridge 2-yard run, Kenneth Almendares kick (Drive: 9 plays, 75 yards, 4:54; Tulane 38–33)
- (5:42) TUL – Ethan Head 38-yard field goal (Drive: 13 plays, 55 yards, 7:35; Tulane 41–33)

Statistics	TULN	ULL
First downs	18	22
Plays–yards	64–355	63–413
Rushes–yards	47–272	28–175
Passing yards	83	238
Passing: Comp–Att–Int	11–17–0	19–35–2
Time of possession	33:57	26:03

Team	Category	Player	Statistics
Tulane	Passing	Darian Mensah	11/17, 83 yards, TD
Tulane	Rushing	Makhi Hughes	23 carries, 166 yards, TD
Tulane	Receiving	Reggie Brown	1 reception, 33 yards, TD
Louisiana	Passing	Ben Wooldridge	19/34, 238 yards, 2 TD, 2 INT
Louisiana	Rushing	Bill Davis	9 carries, 103 yards
Louisiana	Receiving	Terrance Carter	4 receptions, 79 yards, TD

=== South Florida ===
South Florida Bulls (2–2) at Tulane Green Wave (2–2) – Game summary

Quarter	1	2	3	4	Total
Bulls	0	7	3	0	10
Green Wave	14	17	0	14	45

at Yulman Stadium • New Orleans, Louisiana

- Date: September 28th
- Game time: 11:00 a.m. CDT
- Game weather: Sunny • Temperature: 84 °F (29 °C) • Wind: W at 10 miles per hour (16 km/h)
- Game attendance: 20,783
- Referee: Kevin Randall
- TV announcers (ESPNU): Matt Schumacker (play-by-play) and Dustin Fox (analyst)

Game information

First quarter

- (10:37) TULN – Makhi Hughes 5-yard run, Ethan Head kick (Drive: 6 plays, 69 yards, 3:13; Tulane 7–0)
- (4:39) TULN – Dontae Fleming 15-yard pass from Darian Mensah, Ethan Head kick (Drive: 7 plays, 88 yards, 4:17; Tulane 14–0)

Second quarter

- (8:50) TULN – Ethan Head 35-yard field goal (Drive: 14 plays, 68 yards, 8:20; Tulane 17–0)
- (4:18) TULN – Mario Williams 53-yard pass from Darian Mensah, Ethan Head kick (Drive: 4 plays, 74 yards, 1:35; Tulane 24–0)
- (1:54) TULN – Mario Williams 27-yard pass from Darian Mensah, Ethan Head kick (Drive: 2 plays, 29 yards, 0:31; Tulane 31–0)
- (0:34) USF – Byrum Brown 10-yard run, John Cannon kick (Drive: 6 plays, 75 yards, 1:20; Tulane 31–7)

Third quarter

- (6:19) USF – John Cannon 45-yard field goal (Drive: 12 plays, 53 yards, 4:58; Tulane 31–10)

Fourth quarter

- (14:54) TULN – Makhi Hughes 9-yard run, Ethan Head kick (Drive: 12 plays, 75 yards, 6:25; Tulane 38–10)
- (12:28) TULN – Trey Cornist 2-yard run, Ethan Head kick (Drive: 2 plays, 51 yards, 0:28; Tulane 45–10)

Statistics	USF	TULN
First downs	12	30
Plays–yards	53–201	73–528
Rushes–yards	25–26	50–198
Passing yards	175	330
Passing: Comp–Att–Int	16–28–0	19–23–0
Time of possession	17:59	42:01

Team	Category	Player	Statistics
South Florida	Passing	Byrum Brown	12/18, 134 yards
South Florida	Rushing	Nay'Quan Wright	7 carries, 38 yards
South Florida	Receiving	Abdur-Rahmaan Yaseen	5 receptions, 84 yards
Tulane	Passing	Darian Mensah	18/22, 326 yards, 3 TD
Tulane	Rushing	Makhi Hughes	17 carries, 61 yards, 2 TD
Tulane	Receiving	Dontae Fleming	7 receptions, 128 yards, TD

=== at UAB ===
Tulane Green Wave (3–2) at UAB Blazers (1–3) – Game summary

Quarter	1	2	3	4	Total
Green Wave	20	17	20	14	71
Blazers	6	0	0	14	20

at Protective Stadium • Birmingham, Alabama

- Date: October 5th
- Game time: 12:00 p.m. CDT
- Game weather: Sunny • Temperature: 82 °F (28 °C) • Wind: NE at 5 miles per hour (8.0 km/h)
- Game attendance: 19,724
- Referee: Edwin Lee
- TV announcers (ESPN+): Lowell Galindo (play-by-play), Fozzy Whittaker (analyst) and Smacker Miles (sideline)

Game information

First quarter

- (7:33) TUL – Ty Thompson 3-yard run, Ethan Head kick (Drive: 6 plays, 42 yards, 2:26; Tulane 7–0)
- (4:34) UAB – Jonah Delange 33-yard field goal (Drive: 8 plays, 60 yards, 2:59; Tulane 7–3)
- (4:21) TUL – Rayshawn Pleasant 100-yard kickoff return (Tulane 13–3)
- (3:02) TUL – Makhi Hughes 1-yard run, Ethan Head kick (Drive: 2 plays, 12 yards, 1:05; Tulane 20–3)
- (0:44) UAB – Jonah Delange 32-yard field goal (Drive: 6 plays, 66 yards, 2:13; Tulane 20–6)

Second quarter

- (14:46) TUL – Makhi Hughes 51-yard run, Ethan Head kick (Drive: 3 plays, 65 yards, 0:58; Tulane 27–6)
- (6:24) TUL – Ethan Head 25-yard field goal (Drive: 13 plays, 53 yards, 6:37; Tulane 30–6)
- (1:11) TUL – Arnold Barnes III 1-yard run, Ethan Head kick (Drive: 11 plays, 61 yards, 4:15; Tulane 37–6)

Third quarter

- (11:13) TUL – Yulkeith Brown 14-yard pass from Darian Mensah, Ethan Head kick (Drive: 7 plays, 75 yards, 3:47; Tulane 44–6)
- (5:32) TUL – Yulkeith Brown 22-yard pass from Ty Thompson (Drive: 1 play, 22 yards, 0:06; Tulane 50–6)
- (5:18) TUL – Chris Rodgers 29-yard interception, Jacob Barnes kick (Tulane 57–6)

Fourth quarter

- (13:28) UAB – Amare Thomas 73-yard pass from Jalen Kitna, Jonah Delange kick (Drive: 3 plays, 79 yards, 1:28; Tulane 57–13)
- (8:21) TUL – Arnold Barnes III 14-yard run, Jacob Barnes kick (Drive: 9 plays, 75 yards, 5:07; Tulane 64–13)
- (7:04) TUL – Jamauri McClure 29-yard run, Jacob Barnes kick (Drive: 1 play, 29 yards, 0:09; Tulane 71–13)
- (1:22) UAB – Solomon Beebe 6-yard run, Jonah Delange kick (Drive: 13 plays, 75 yards, 5:42; Tulane 71–20)

Statistics	TULN	UAB
First downs	24	13
Plays–yards	68–497	65–305
Rushes–yards	50–317	22–75
Passing yards	180	230
Passing: Comp–Att–Int	14–18–0	21–43–3
Time of possession	33:27	26:33

Team	Category	Player	Statistics
Tulane	Passing	Darian Mensah	12/15, 134 yards, TD
Tulane	Rushing	Makhi Hughes	15 carries, 119 yards, 2 TD
Tulane	Receiving	Yulkeith Brown	4 receptions, 60 yards, 2 TD
UAB	Passing	Jalen Kitna	20/41, 239 yards, TD, 3 INT
UAB	Rushing	Lee Beebe Jr.	9 carries, 78 yards
UAB	Receiving	Amare Thomas	5 receptions, 98 yards, TD

=== Rice ===
Rice Owls (2–4) at Tulane Green Wave (4–2) – Game summary

Quarter	1	2	3	4	Total
Owls	0	7	3	0	10
Green Wave	3	7	0	14	24

at Yulman Stadium • New Orleans, Louisiana

- Date: October 19th
- Game time: 2:30 p.m. CDT
- Game weather: Sunny • Temperature: 77 °F (25 °C) • Wind: NE 12 miles per hour (19 km/h)
- Game attendance: 22,897
- Referee: Charles Lamertina
- TV announcers (ESPN+): James Westling (play-by-play) and Leger Douzable (analyst)

Game information

First quarter

- (1:43) TULN – Jacob Barnes 28-yard field goal (Drive: 10 plays, 36 yards, 6:33; Tulane 3–0)

Second quarter

- (14:12) RICE – Elijah Mojarro 31-yard pass from E. J. Warner, Tim Horn kick (Drive: 5 plays, 75 yards, 2:31; Rice 7–3)
- (1:04) TULN – Makhi Hughes 29-yard pass from Darian Mensah, Jacob Barnes kick (Drive: 6 plays, 62 yards, 2:18; Tulane 10–7)

Third quarter

- (6:48) RICE – Tim Horn 35-yard field goal (Drive: 9 plays, 56 yards, 4:23; Tied 10–10)

Fourth quarter

- (8:22) TULN – Makhi Hughes 1-yard run, Jacob Barnes kick (Drive: 7 plays, 70 yards, 4:28; Tulane 17–10)
- (1:35) TULN – Sam Howard 15-yard fumble recovery, Jacob Barnes kick (Tulane 24–10)

Statistics	RICE	TULN
First downs	16	18
Plays–yards	63–344	65–306
Rushes–yards	17–73	40–154
Passing yards	271	152
Passing: Comp–Att–Int	26–46–3	12–25–0
Time of possession	25:03	34:57

Team	Category	Player	Statistics
Rice	Passing	E. J. Warner	26/46, 271 yards, TD, 3 INT
Rice	Rushing	Dean Connors	11 carries, 76 yards
Rice	Receiving	Kobie Campbell	6 receptions, 100 yards
Tulane	Passing	Darian Mensah	12/25, 152 yards, TD
Tulane	Rushing	Makhi Hughes	27 carries, 140 yards, TD
Tulane	Receiving	Dontae Fleming	2 receptions, 36 yards

=== at North Texas ===
Tulane Green Wave (5–2) at North Texas Mean Green (5–2) – Game summary

Quarter	1	2	3	4	Total
Green Wave	21	10	14	0	45
Mean Green	3	14	7	13	37

at DATCU Stadium • Denton, Texas

- Date: October 26th
- Game time: 11:00 a.m. CDT
- Game weather: Sunny • Temperature: 72 °F (22 °C) • Wind: S 10 miles per hour (16 km/h)
- Game attendance: 23,138
- Referee: Kevin Randall
- TV announcers (ESPN2): Brian Custer (play-by-play), Rod Gilmore (analyst) and Lauren Sisler (sideline)

Game information

First quarter

- (7:50) TULN – Mario Williams 9-yard pass from Darian Mensah, Jacob Barnes kick (Drive: 7 plays, 44 yards, 3:46; Tulane 7–0)
- (4:12) UNT – Kali Nguma 43-yard field goal (Drive: 9 plays, 60 yards, 3:33; Tulane 7–3)
- (2:07) TULN – Yulkeith Brown 30-yard pass from Darian Mensah, Jacob Barnes kick (Drive: 4 plays, 75 yards, 2:05; Tulane 14–3)
- (1:16) TULN – Ty Thompson 17-yard run, Jacob Barnes kick (Drive: 2 plays, 28 yards, 0:44; Tulane 21–3)

Second quarter

- (10:01) UNT – Damon Ward Jr. 26-yard pass from Chandler Morris, Kali Nguma kick (Drive: 5 plays, 57 yards, 2:08; Tulane 21–10)
- (5:50) TULN – Makhi Hughes 2-yard run, Jacob Barnes kick (Drive: 7 plays, 68 yards, 4:11; Tulane 28–10)
- (1:22) UNT – DT Sheffield 30-yard pass from Chandler Morris, Kali Nguma kick (Drive: 4 plays, 47 yards, 0:43; Tulane 28–17)
- (0:28) TULN – Jacob Barnes 47-yard field goal (Drive: 6 plays, 43 yards, 0:53; Tulane 31–17)

Third quarter

- (8:06) TULN – Alex Bauman 14-yard pass from Darian Mensah (Drive: 7 plays, 72 yards, 3:44; Tulane 37–17)
- (5:55) UNT – Chandler Morris 20-yard run, Kali Nguma kick (Drive: 7 plays, 75 yards, 2:11; Tulane 37–24)
- (3:02) TULN – Yulkeith Brown 11-yard run, Yukeith Brown pass (Drive: 1 play, 11 yards, 0:05; Tulane 45–24)

Fourth quarter

- (4:23) UNT – Makenzie McGill II 2-yard run (Drive: 19 plays, 80 yards, 7:20; Tulane 45–30)
- (0:41) UNT – Damon Ward Jr. 10-yard pass from Chandler Morris, Kali Nguma kick (Drive: 11 plays, 90 yards, 1:47; Tulane 45–37)

Statistics	TULN	UNT
First downs	21	28
Plays–yards	60–472	82–525
Rushes–yards	47–297	25–76
Passing yards	175	449
Passing: Comp–Att–Int	10–13–1	38–57–0
Time of possession	30:59	29:01

Team	Category	Player	Statistics
Tulane	Passing	Darian Mensah	10/13, 175 yards, 3 TD, INT
Tulane	Rushing	Makhi Hughes	30 carries, 195 yards, TD
Tulane	Receiving	Dontae Fleming	3 receptions, 92 yards
North Texas	Passing	Chandler Morris	38/57, 449 yards, 3 TD
North Texas	Rushing	Chandler Morris	6 carries, 20 yards, TD
North Texas	Receiving	DT Sheffield	9 receptions, 125 yards, TD

=== at Charlotte ===
Tulane Green Wave (6–2) at Charlotte 49ers (3–5) – Game summary

Quarter	1	2	3	4	Total
Green Wave	3	7	10	14	34
49ers	0	3	0	0	3

at Jerry Richardson Stadium • Charlotte, North Carolina

- Date: October 31st
- Game time: 6:30 p.m. CDT
- Game weather: Clear • Temperature: 70 °F (21 °C)
- Game attendance: 12,268
- Referee: Steven Anderson
- TV announcers (ESPN): Matt Barrie (play-by-play), Dan Mullen (analyst) and Harry Lyles Jr. (sideline)

Game information

First quarter

- (2:00) TULN – Jacob Barnes 34-yard field goal (Drive: 20 plays, 80 yards, 10:58; Tulane 3–0)

Second quarter

- (1:45) TULN – Makhi Hughes 1-yard run, Jacob Barnes kick (Drive: 14 plays, 76 yards, 5:46; Tulane 10–0)
- (0:00) CLT – Stephen Rusnak 29-yard field goal (Drive: 6 plays, 43 yards, 1:38; Tulane 10–3)

Third quarter

- (9:36) TULN – Jacob Barnes 34-yard field goal (Drive: 10 plays, 59 yards, 5:24; Tulane 13–3)
- (8:27) TULN – Micah Robinson 21-yard interception (Tulane 20–3)

Fourth quarter

- (14:08) TULN – Makhi Hughes 1-yard run, Jacob Barnes kick (Drive: 13 plays, 68 yards, 7:19; Tulane 27–3)
- (2:22) TULN – Shaadie Clayton-Johnson 5-yard run, Jacob Barnes kick (Drive: 7 plays, 47 yards, 3:21; Tulane 34–3)

Statistics	TULN	CLT
First downs	29	12
Plays–yards	78–431	44–189
Rushes–yards	49–217	22–120
Passing yards	214	69
Passing: Comp–Att–Int	21–29–0	7–22–1
Time of possession	42:09	17:51

Team	Category	Player	Statistics
Tulane	Passing	Darian Mensah	21/29, 214 yards
Tulane	Rushing	Makhi Hughes	27 carries, 117 yards, 2 TD
Tulane	Receiving	Mario Williams	6 receptions, 96 yards
Charlotte	Passing	Deshawn Purdie	5/12, 66 yards, INT
Charlotte	Rushing	Hahsaun Wilson	6 carries, 68 yards
Charlotte	Receiving	O'Mega Blake	3 receptions, 52 yards

=== Temple ===
Temple Owls (2–6) at Tulane Green Wave (7–2) – Game summary

Quarter	1	2	3	4	Total
Owls	0	0	0	6	6
Green Wave	7	21	14	10	52

at Yulman Stadium • New Orleans, Louisiana

- Date: November 9th
- Game time: 3:00 p.m. CST
- Game weather: Cloudy • Temperature: 80 °F (27 °C) • Wind: SE 15 miles per hour (24 km/h)
- Game attendance: 30,000
- Referee: Darryl DeBerry
- TV announcers (ESPNU): Courtney Lyle (play-by-play) and Rene Ingoglia (analyst)

Game information

First quarter

- (10:16) TULN – Makhi Hughes 4-yard run, Patrick Durkin kick (Drive: 10 plays, 75 yards, 4:44; Tulane 7–0)

Second quarter

- (11:03) TULN – Shazz Preston 53-yard pass from Darian Mensah, Patrick Durkin kick (Drive: 2 plays, 61 yards, 0:42; Tulane 14–0)
- (5:14) TULN – Arnold Barnes III 2-yard run, Patrick Durkin kick (Drive: 7 plays, 57 yards, 4:21; Tulane 21–0)
- (1:45) TULN – Makhi Hughes 3-yard run, Patrick Durkin kick (Drive: 5 plays, 59 yards, 1:15; Tulane 28–0)

Third quarter

- (8:11) TULN – Arnold Barnes III 5-yard run, Patrick Durkin kick (Drive: 10 plays, 68 yards, 5:28; Tulane 35–0)
- (5:23) TULN – Alex Bauman 6-yard pass from Darian Mensah, Patrick Durkin kick (Drive: 4 plays, 67 yards, 1:45; Tulane 42–0)

Fourth quarter

- (14:15) TULN – Patrick Durkin 24-yard field goal (Drive: 8 plays, 50 yards, 4:27; Tulane 45–0)
- (7:23) TULN – Ty Thompson 50-yard run, Ethan Head kick (Drive: 3 plays, 42 yards, 0:58; Tulane 52–0)
- (7:09) TEM – Terrez Worthy 75-yard run (Drive: 1 play, 75 yards, 0:15; Tulane 52–6)

Statistics	TEM	TULN
First downs	5	26
Plays–yards	45–158	75–589
Rushes–yards	23–102	52–327
Passing yards	56	262
Passing: Comp–Att–Int	11–22–0	14–23–1
Time of possession	20:57	39:03

Team	Category	Player	Statistics
Temple	Passing	Evan Simon	11/22, 56 yards
Temple	Rushing	Terrez Worthy	5 carries, 80 yards, TD
Temple	Receiving	Daniel Evert	1 reception, 16 yards
Tulane	Passing	Darian Mensah	14/21, 262 yards, 2 TD, INT
Tulane	Rushing	Makhi Hughes	19 carries, 153 yards, 2 TD
Tulane	Receiving	Mario Williams	4 receptions, 94 yards

=== at Navy ===
No. 25 Tulane Green Wave (8–2) at Navy Midshipmen (7–2) – Game summary

Quarter	1	2	3	4	Total
No. 25 Green Wave	7	7	7	14	35
Midshipmen	0	0	0	0	0

at Navy–Marine Corps Memorial Stadium • Annapolis, Maryland

- Date: November 16th
- Game time: 11:00 a.m. CST
- Game weather: Temperature: 58 °F (14 °C) • Wind: SE at 13 miles per hour (21 km/h) • Weather: Sunny
- Game attendance: 38,914
- Referee: Tim Rich
- TV announcers (ESPN2): Roy Philpott (play-by-play), Sam Acho (analyst), and Taylor Davis (sideline)

Game information

First quarter

- (1:07) TUL – Darian Mensah 14-yard run, Patrick Durkin kick (Drive: 5 plays, 63 yards, 1:58; Tulane 7–0)

Second quarter

- (4:00) TUL – Makhi Hughes 14-yard run, Patrick Durkin kick (Drive: 11 plays, 65 yards, 6:12; Tulane 14–0)

Third quarter

- (6:15) TUL – Makhi Hughes 1-yard run, Patrick Durkin kick (Drive: 13 plays, 65 yards, 8:45; Tulane 21–0)

Fourth quarter

- (9:19) TUL – Alex Bauman 1-yard pass from Darian Mensah, Patrick Durkin kick (Drive: 9 plays, 79 yards, 5:22; Tulane 28–0)
- (7:38) TUL – Arnold Barnes III 1-yard pass from Darian Mensah, Patrick Durkin kick (Drive: 3 plays, 20 yards, 1:35; Tulane 35–0)

Statistics	TULN	NAVY
First downs	20	8
Plays–yards	62–358	46–113
Rushes–yards	48–220	35–100
Passing yards	138	13
Passing: Comp–Att–Int	10–14–0	3–11–1
Time of possession	35:47	24:13

Team	Category	Player	Statistics
Tulane	Passing	Darian Mensah	10/14, 138 yards, 2 TD
Tulane	Rushing	Makhi Hughes	22 carries, 82 yards, 2 TD
Tulane	Receiving	Dontae Fleming	2 receptions, 56 yards
Navy	Passing	Braxton Woodson	3/10, 13 yards, INT
Navy	Rushing	Alex Tecza	7 carries, 31 yards
Navy	Receiving	Luke Hutchinson	2 receptions, 8 yards

=== Memphis ===
Memphis Tigers (9–2) at No. 17 Tulane Green Wave (9–2) – Game summary

Quarter	1	2	3	4	Total
Tigers	7	10	7	10	34
No. 17 Green Wave	10	0	0	14	24

at Yulman Stadium • New Orleans, Louisiana

- Date: November 28th
- Game time: 6:30 p.m. CST
- Game weather: Temperature: 56 °F (13 °C) • Wind: SW at 12 miles per hour (19 km/h) • Weather: Partly Cloudy
- Game attendance: 25,021
- Referee: Kevin Randall
- TV announcers (ESPN): Matt Barrie (play-by-play), Dan Mullen (analyst), and Harry Lyles Jr. (sideline)

Game information

First quarter

- (11:04) MEM – Greg Desrosiers Jr. 17-yard pass from Seth Henigan, Tristian Vandenberg kick (Drive: 8 plays, 75 yards, 3:56; Memphis 7–0)
- (6:58) TUL – Patrick Durkin 44-yard field goal (Drive: 10 plays, 49 yards, 4:06; Memphis 7–3)
- (0:34) TUL – Mario Williams 7-yard pass from Darian Mensah, Patrick Durkin kick (Drive: 8 plays, 63 yards, 4:21; Tulane 10–7)

Second quarter

- (10:40) MEM – Greg Desrosiers Jr. 25-yard pass from Seth Henigan, Tristian Vandenberg kick (Drive: 9 plays, 75 yards, 4:54; Memphis 14–10)
- (1:45) MEM – Tristian Vandenberg 28-yard field goal (Drive: 14 plays, 60 yards, 6:31; Memphis 17–10)

Third quarter

- (11:02) MEM – Greg Desrosiers Jr. 29-yard pass from Seth Henigan, Tristian Vandenberg kick (Drive: 5 plays, 53 yards, 2:22; Memphis 24–10)

Fourth quarter

- (14:57) MEM – Tristian Vandenberg 23-yard field goal (Drive: 16 plays, 65 yards, 8:56; Memphis 27–10)
- (13:29) TUL – Arnold Barnes III 2-yard run, Patrick Durkin kick (Drive: 5 plays, 78 yards, 1:22; Memphis 27–17)
- (2:41) MEM – Mario Anderson Jr. 47-yard run, Tristian Vandenberg kick (Drive: 7 plays, 98 yards, 4:16; Memphis 34–17)
- (1:08) TUL – Shazz Preston 3-yard pass from Darian Mensah, Patrick Durkin kick (Drive: 8 plays, 48 yards, 1:26; Memphis 34–24)

Statistics	MEM	TULN
First downs	26	15
Plays–yards	77–454	51–374
Rushes–yards	48–236	18–57
Passing yards	218	317
Passing: Comp–Att–Int	22–29–0	21–33–1
Time of possession	39:40	20:20

Team	Category	Player	Statistics
Memphis	Passing	Seth Henigan	22/29, 218 yards, 2 TD
Memphis	Rushing	Mario Anderson Jr.	24 carries, 177 yards, TD
Memphis	Receiving	Roc Taylor	7 receptions, 96 yards
Tulane	Passing	Darian Mensah	21/33, 317 yards, 2 TD, INT
Tulane	Rushing	Shaadie Clayton-Johnson	2 carries, 29 yards
Tulane	Receiving	Mario Williams	7 receptions, 130 yards, TD

=== at No. 24 Army (AAC Championship) ===
Tulane Green Wave (9–3) at No. 24 Army Black Knights (10–1) – Game summary

Quarter	1	2	3	4	Total
Green Wave	0	7	0	7	14
No. 24 Black Knights	7	14	7	7	35

at Michie Stadium • West Point, NY

- Date: December 6th
- Game time: 8:00 p.m. CST
- Game weather: Temperature: 27 °F (−3 °C) • Wind: W at 7 miles per hour (11 km/h) • Weather: Fair
- Game attendance: 14,016
- Referee: Tim Rich
- TV announcers (ABC): Dave Pasch (play-by-play), Dusty Dvoracek (color analyst), and Taylor McGregor (sideline reporter)

Game information

First quarter

- (3:48) ARMY – Bryson Daily 5-yard run, Trey Gronotte kick (Drive: 11 plays, 72 yards, 6:36; Army 7–0)

Second quarter

- (10:18) ARMY – Bryson Daily 3-yard run, Trey Gronotte kick (Drive: 3 plays, 80 yards, 1:26; Army 14–0)
- (1:40) ARMY – Bryson Daily 4-yard run, Trey Gronotte kick (Drive: 5 plays, 21 yards, 1:00; Army 21–0)
- (0:44) TULN – Mario Williams 42-yard pass from Darian Mensah, Patrick Durkin kick (Drive: 4 plays, 60 yards, 0:52; Army 21–7)

Third quarter

- (8:29) UTSA – Bryson Daily 7-yard run, Trey Gronotte kick (Drive: 11 plays, 75 yards, 6:31; Army 28–7)

Fourth quarter

- (6:29) ARMY – Kanye Udoh 1-yard run, Trey Gronotte kick (Drive: 16 plays, 84 yards, 10:44; Army 35–7)
- (1:10) TULN – Alex Bauman 2-yard pass from Darian Mensah, Patrick Durkin kick (Drive: 16 plays, 80 yards, 5:13; Army 35–14)

Statistics	TULN	ARMY
First downs	17	20
Plays–yards	55–324	59–352
Rushes–yards	29–115	57–335
Passing yards	209	17
Passing: Comp–Att–Int	17–25–1	2–2–0
Time of possession	25:40	34:20

Team	Category	Player	Statistics
Tulane	Passing	Darian Mensah	17/25, 209 yards, 2 TD, INT
Tulane	Rushing	Makhi Hughes	14 carries, 66 yards
Tulane	Receiving	Mario Williams	6 receptions, 109 yards, TD
Army	Passing	Bryson Daily	2/2, 17 yards
Army	Rushing	Kanye Udoh	20 carries, 158 yards, TD
Army	Receiving	Casey Reynolds	1 reception, 9 yards

=== Florida (Gasparilla Bowl) ===
2024 Gasparilla Bowl
Tulane Green Wave (9–4, 7–1) at Florida Gators (7–5, 4–4)

Quarter	1	2	3	4	Total
Green Wave	0	0	0	8	8
Gators	3	3	10	17	33

at Raymond James Stadium, Tampa, Florida

- Date: December 20th, 2024
- Game time: 2:30 p.m. CST/12:30 p.m. PST
- Game weather: Sunny • Temperature: 66 °F (19 °C) • Wind: 15 mph (24 km/h) northwest
- Game attendance: 41,472
- Referee: Matt Packowski
- TV announcers (ESPN2): Anish Shroff (play-by-play), Andre Ware (analyst), and Paul Carcaterra (sideline)

Game information

First quarter

- (12:51) FLA – Trey Smack 34-yard field goal (Drive: 9 plays, 61 yards, 4:55; Florida 3–0)

Second quarter

- (9:12) FLA – Trey Smack 44-yard field goal (Drive: 9 plays, 54 yards, 5:41; Florida 6–0)

Third quarter

- (9:11) FLA – Trey Smack 24-yard field goal (Drive: 10 plays, 59 yards, 3:58; Florida 9–0)
- (4:03) FLA – Tony Livingston 7-yard pass from DJ Lagway, Trey Smack kick (Drive: 7 plays, 60 yards, 3:22; Florida 16–0)

Fourth quarter

- (13:03) FLA – Trey Smack 30-yard field goal (Drive: 7 plays, 35 yards, 3:02; Florida 19–0)
- (6:29) FLA – KD Daniels 25-yard run, Trey Smack kick (Drive: 4 plays, 34 yards, 1:30; Florida 26–0)
- (1:11) FLA – Anthony Rubio 9-yard run, Trey Smack kick (Drive: 9 plays, 47 yards, 4:43; Florida 33–0)
- (0:29) TULN – Mario Williams 16-yard pass from Ty Thompson, Ty Thompson pass to Zycarl Lewis Jr. for 2-point conversion (Drive: 5 plays, 55 yards, 0:42; Florida 33–8)

Statistics	TULN	UF
First downs	11	26
Total yards	194	529
Rushing yards	69	224
Passing yards	125	305
Passing: Comp–Att–Int	11-30-3	22–35–2
Time of possession	21:03	38:57

Team	Category	Player	Statistics
Tulane	Passing	Ty Thompson	11/29, 125 yards, TD, 3 INT
Tulane	Rushing	Makhi Hughes	8 carries, 29 yards
Tulane	Receiving	Mario Williams	6 receptions, 91 yards, TD
Florida	Passing	DJ Lagway	22/35, 305 yards, TD, 2 INT
Florida	Rushing	Jadan Baugh	14 carries, 70 yards
Florida	Receiving	Chimere Dike	6 receptions, 96 yards

== Rankings ==
Ranking movements Legend: ██ Increase in ranking ██ Decrease in ranking — = Not ranked RV = Received votes
	Week																
Poll	Pre	1	2	3	4	5	6	7	8	9	10	11	12	13	14	15	Final
AP	RV	RV	—	—	—	—	—	—	—	RV	RV	25	20	18	RV	RV	—
Coaches	RV	RV	RV	—	—	RV	RV	RV	RV	RV	RV	RV	20	18	RV	RV	—
CFP	Not released										—	25	20	17	—	—	Not released
