= Andrew Zock =

American football player (born 2005)

No. 0 – Toledo Rockets
- Position: Defensive end
- Class: Junior

Personal information
- Born: December 28, 2005 (age 20)
- Listed height: 6 ft 2 in (1.88 m)
- Listed weight: 250 lb (113 kg)

Career information
- High school: Hawthorne (Hawthorne, Florida)
- College: Mercer (2024–2025); Toledo (2026–present)

Awards and highlights
- Buck Buchanan Award (2025)
- Stats at ESPN

Andrew Zock (born December 28, 2005) is an American college football defensive end for the Toledo Rockets. He previously played for the Mercer Bears. He won the 2025 Buck Buchanan Award as the best defensive player at the NCAA Division I FCS level.

== Early life ==
Zock is from Citra, Florida. He first attended North Marion High School in Citra where he competed in football, basketball, track and field and weightlifting. He posted 69 tackles, 33.5 tackles-for-loss (TFLs) and 20 sacks in his junior year at North Marion, being named the district player of the year as well as all-county and all-state. He then transferred to Hawthorne High School for his senior year and won a state championship after posting 143 tackles, 20 TFLs and 5.5 sacks, being named the All-Area Small School Defensive Player of the Year by the Gainesville Sun. He initially committed to play college football for the Navy Midshipmen. However, he ultimately joined the Mercer Bears to begin his college career.

== College career ==
After playing as a linebacker at Hawthorne, Zock moved to defensive end as a freshman at Mercer in 2024. He tore his meniscus midseason but continued playing and helped the Bears to the NCAA Division I FCS playoffs. He finished the season with 38 tackles, 14.5 TFLs and seven sacks, being named the Southern Conference (SoCon) Freshman of the Year, second-team All-SoCon, and placing fourth in voting for the Jerry Rice Award for the best freshman nationally. He also posted 15 hurries during his freshman year, breaking the school record. As a sophomore, Zock appeared in 12 regular season games, recording 46 tackles, 20 TFLs, 11.5 sacks and 23 quarterback hurries, being named the Buck Buchanan Award winner as the best defensive player at the FCS level.

After the 2025 season, Zock entered the NCAA transfer portal. He transferred to the Toledo Rockets.
