= Hawthorne High School (Florida) =

Public school in Florida, United States

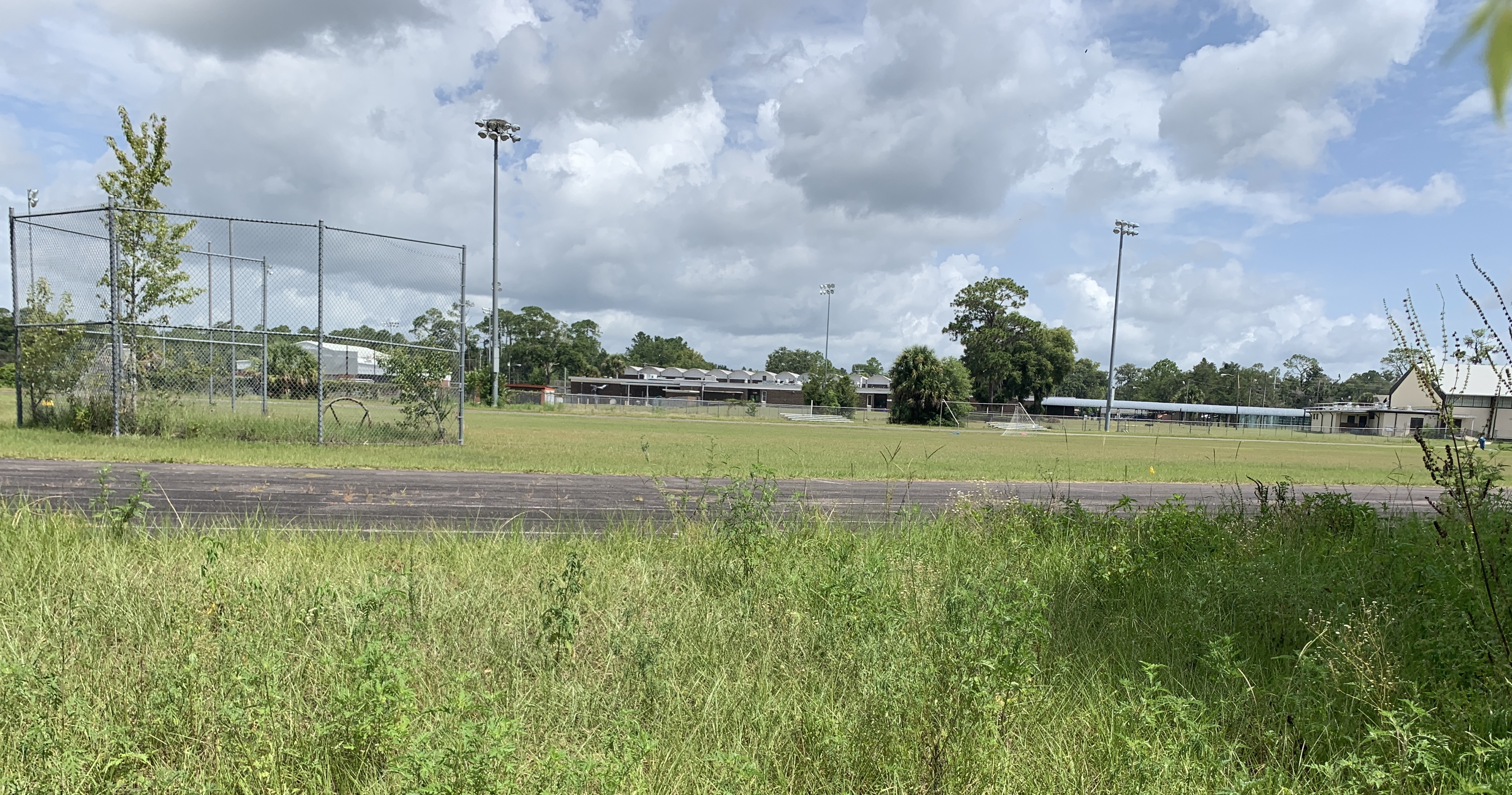

Location
- 21403 Southeast 69th Avenue; Gainesville; Hawthorne, (Alachua County), Florida 32640; United States
- Coordinates: 29.5890°N 82.0938°W

Information
- Type: Public
- Motto: None
- Status: Open
- School board: Alachua County School District
- School district: Alachua County School District
- Superintendent: Kamela Patton
- Principal: John Green
- Staff: 15.68 (FTE)
- Grades: 6-12
- Student to teacher ratio: 31.38
- Campus size: Average
- Colors: Orange and black
- Athletics: Varsity, Junior Varsity, and middle school
- Sports: Baseball, basketball, cheerleading, cross country, football, soccer, softball, track, volleyball, and weightlifting
- Mascot: Hornet
- Team name: Hornets
- Website: www.alachuaschools.net/o/hawthorne

Hawthorne High School and Middle School is a grades 6-12 public high school and middle school in Hawthorne, Florida, United States.

Its boundary includes Hawthorne and Waldo.

== Athletics ==
Hawthorne High and Middle School offers many different sports, including basketball, baseball, cheerleading, football, softball, volleyball, and track.

In 2020, Hawthorne High School won Florida state championships in division 1A for both its girls and boys basketball teams, while its football team also advanced to the state championship game for the first time in the school's history. The girls' basketball team went on to win back to back state championships in 2023 and 2024, while the boys basketball team won their 2nd state title in 5 years (3rd overall) in 2025. Hawthorne's football team has appeared in the state championship game from the 2020 to the 2025 seasons, winning the state title in 2022, 2023, and 2025. The Hornets have totaled 8 state championships between boys basketball, girls basketball and football from the year 2020 to the year 2025.

== Notable alumni ==
- Cornelius Ingram, former American football player, Philadelphia Eagles (2009–2011), University of Florida (2004–09)
- Kevin Lynum, American college basketball coach, Florida A&M University (2018–2020), Norfolk State University (2022–Present)
- Andrew Zock, college football defensive end for the Mercer Bears
- Jailen Ruth, College Football Edge, Vanderbilt Commodores
- CJ Ingram, College Basketball Guard, University of Florida
- Alvon Isaac, College Football Running Back, University of South Florida
