= Buck Buchanan Award =

Football award

- Awarded for: Most Outstanding Defensive Player in the Division I Football Championship Subdivision
- Country: United States
- Presented by: Stats Perform

History
- First award: 1995
- Most recent: Mercer defensive end Andrew Zock
- Website: www.fcs.football

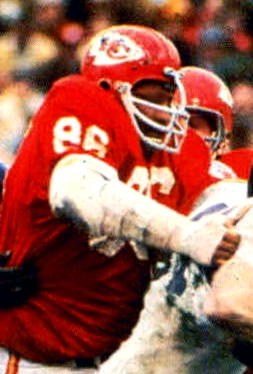
The award is named to honor the late Buck Buchanan.

The Buck Buchanan Award is awarded annually to the most outstanding defensive player in the Division I Football Championship Subdivision (formerly Division I-AA) of college football, and was first given in 1995 after the Walter Payton Award was designated solely for offensive players.

It was named in honor of Pro Football Hall of Fame defensive tackle Buck Buchanan (died 1992), who starred at Grambling State University. Buchanan was an All-American defensive lineman and the first overall pick in the 1963 American Football League (AFL) Draft by the Kansas City Chiefs.

Up until presentations for the 2014 season, the Payton and Buchanan Awards were awarded by The Sports Network. Since STATS LLC, now known as Stats Perform, acquired The Sports Network in February 2015, it has presented all of the major FCS awards. Through the 2011 season, the awards were presented the night before the NCAA Division I Football Championship, but the 2012 awards were presented on December 17, nearly three weeks before that season's championship game.

== Winners ==
Season	Winner	Pos.	School	Ref.
1995	Dexter Coakley	LB	Appalachian State	
1996	Dexter Coakley (2)	LB	Appalachian State	
1997	Chris McNeil	DE	North Carolina A&T	
1998	James Milton	LB	Western Illinois	
1999	Al Lucas	DT	Troy State	
2000	Edgerton Hartwell	LB	Western Illinois	
2001	Derrick Lloyd	LB	James Madison	
2002	Rashean Mathis	CB	Bethune–Cookman	
2003	Jared Allen	DE	Idaho State	
2004	Jordan Beck	LB	Cal Poly	
2005	Chris Gocong	DE	Cal Poly	
2006	Kyle Shotwell	LB	Cal Poly	
2007	Kroy Biermann	DE	Montana	
2008	Greg Peach	DE	Eastern Washington	
2009	Arthur Moats	DE	James Madison	
2010	J. C. Sherritt	LB	Eastern Washington	
2011	Matt Evans	LB	New Hampshire	
2012	Caleb Schreibeis	DE	Montana State	
2013	Brad Daly	DE	Montana State	
2014	Kyle Emanuel	DE	North Dakota State	
2015	Deon King	LB	Norfolk State	
2016	Karter Schult	DE	Northern Iowa	
2017	Darius Jackson	DE	Jacksonville State	
2018	Zach Hall	LB	Southeast Missouri State	
2019	Dante Olson	LB	Montana	
2020–21	Jordan Lewis	DE	Southern	
2021	Isaiah Land	DE	Florida A&M	
2022	Zeke Vandenburgh	LB	Illinois State	
2023	Terrell Allen	DE	Tennessee State	
2024	David Walker	DE	Central Arkansas	
2025	Andrew Zock	DE	Mercer	

== Awards won by school ==
This is a list of the colleges and universities who have had a player win a Buck Buchanan Award. Cal Poly (2004, 2005, 2006) is the only program with three winners. Appalachian State (1995–1996), Eastern Washington (2008, 2010), James Madison (2001, 2009), Montana (2007, 2019), Montana State (2012–2013), and Western Illinois (1998, 2000), are the only schools to win the award twice. Dexter Coakley of Appalachian State is the only player to win the award twice.

School	Awards
Cal Poly	3
Appalachian State^	2
Eastern Washington	2
James Madison^	2
Montana	2
Montana State	2
Western Illinois	2
Bethune–Cookman	1
Central Arkansas	1
Florida A&M	1
Idaho State	1
Illinois State	1
Jacksonville State^	1
Mercer	1
New Hampshire	1
Norfolk State	1
North Carolina A&T	1
North Dakota State	1
Northern Iowa	1
Southeast Missouri State	1
Southern	1
Tennessee State	1
Troy State^	1

^ Team is now a member of the Football Bowl Subdivision (FBS).
