= Cornelius Ingram =

American football player (born 1985)

No. 47, 88, 84
- Position: Tight end

Personal information
- Born: June 10, 1985 (age 41); Hawthorne, Florida, U.S.
- Listed height: 6 ft 4 in (1.93 m)
- Listed weight: 245 lb (111 kg)

Career information
- High school: Hawthorne
- College: Florida
- NFL draft: 2009: 5th round, 153rd overall pick

Career history
- Philadelphia Eagles (2009–2011); Detroit Lions (2011)*; Denver Broncos (2011–2012)*
- * Offseason or practice squad member only

Awards and highlights
- BCS national champion (2007, 2009); Second-team All-SEC (2007)
- Stats at Pro Football Reference

Cornelius Ingram (born June 10, 1985) is an American former professional football player who was a tight end in the National Football League (NFL). He played college football and college basketball for the Florida Gators. He was selected by the Philadelphia Eagles in the fifth round of the 2009 NFL draft and spent three seasons with the team, appearing in no regular season games and spending much of his tenure on the team's practice squad. He spent time on the Detroit Lions' practice squad in 2011 after he was waived by the Eagles during final roster cuts before the start of the season.

== College career ==
Ingram accepted an athletic scholarship to attend the University of Florida, where he played for coach Ron Zook and coach Urban Meyer's Florida Gators football teams from 2004 to 2007. He practiced at quarterback on the scout team for the Gators but did not see any game action. He was the scout team "Player of the Week" vs. Arkansas. He joined coach Billy Donovan's Florida Gators basketball team October 15 for practice and played in 19 games as a true freshman on that squad as a shooting guard.

As a football redshirt freshman in 2005, Ingram played in two games in the season that saw him move from quarterback to tight end. He saw action at quarterback in the victory over Louisiana Tech, directing one offensive drive in the fourth quarter. He appeared in several offensive plays at wide receiver throughout the 2006 Outback Bowl against the Iowa Hawkeyes. The Gators won 31–24. As a sophomore in 2006, he played a role in the Florida Gators' 2006 BCS National Championship. He finished the year with 30 receptions for 380 yards.

Following his 2007 junior season, Ingram was recognized as a second-team All-SEC selection by the Associated Press and conference coaches. He was also a candidate for the John Mackey Award presented to the nation's best tight end. On August 6, 2008, Ingram seriously injured knee ligaments during fall practice. As a result, he missed his entire senior season.

== Professional career ==
=== Philadelphia Eagles ===
Ingram was selected by the Philadelphia Eagles in the fifth round (153rd overall) of the 2009 NFL draft on April 26, 2009, and eventually signed a four-year, $1.9 million contract.

Ingram tore his anterior cruciate ligament during Philadelphia's training camp in 2009. This was the same injury that kept Ingram from playing his senior season at Florida. He was placed on injured reserve on September 1, 2009. He was waived on September 4, 2010 during final cuts, but was re-signed to the Eagles' practice squad on November 11. He was released from the practice squad on December 16. He was re-signed to the practice squad on December 22. His practice squad contract expired after the conclusion of the season. He was re-signed to a future contract on January 11, 2011. He was waived during final cuts on September 2.

=== Detroit Lions ===
The Detroit Lions signed Ingram to their practice squad on September 7, 2011. He was placed on the practice squad/injured list on September 13 and was released with an injury settlement on September 28.

=== Denver Broncos ===
The Denver Broncos signed Ingram to their practice squad on December 27, 2011. On January 16, 2012, Ingram was signed to a reserve/future contract. On August 31, 2012, Ingram was waived and did not make the final 53-man roster. On September 1, 2012, Ingram cleared waivers and was placed on the practice squad. On September 27, 2012, he was released by the Broncos.

== Post-playing career ==
In December 2014, Ingram became the head football coach at his alma mater, Hawthorne High School (Florida). He had previously served as volunteer coach there. In addition to his football activities, Ingram coached the Hawthorne girls basketball team to winning the Florida 1A state championships in 2020, 2023, and 2024. His football program was state runner-up in Florida division 1A in both 2020 and 2021. Ingram led the hornets to their first state title in 2022, beating Northview 13–2 on December 10, 2022. Hawthorne repeated as state champs the following year, defeating Madison County 22–13.

== Personal life ==
Ingram has 3 sons. One of them, CJ Ingram, plays for the Florida Gators men's basketball team.
