= Terrell Allen =

American football player

No. 9
- Position: Defensive lineman

Personal information
- Listed height: 6 ft 0 in (1.83 m)
- Listed weight: 275 lb (125 kg)

Career information
- High school: North Little Rock (Arkansas)
- College: Austin Peay (2020–2021); Tennessee State (2022–2023); Tulane (2024)

Awards and highlights
- Buck Buchanan Award (2023); Big South–OVC Defensive Player of the Year (2023); First-team All-Big South–OVC (2023); First-team All-OVC (2022); Second-team All-OVC (2021)
- Stats at ESPN

Terrell Anthony Allen is an American former college football defensive lineman who played for the Austin Peay Governors, Tennessee State Tigers, and Tulane Green Wave.

== Early life ==
Allen played high school football at North Little Rock High School in North Little Rock, Arkansas. He won the state title in 2017. He recorded 72 tackles and 14 sacks his senior year, earning all-state honors.

== College career ==
Allen first played college football for the Austin Peay Governors from 2020 to 2021. The 2020 season was moved to spring 2021 due to the COVID-19 pandemic. He played in eight games, starting three, during the COVID-19 shortened 2020 season and made 18 tackles. He appeared in all 11 games, starting 10, during the fall 2021 season, totaling 36 tackles, 5 sacks, and two forced fumbles, garnering HERO Sports Sophomore All-American and second-team All-OVC recognition.

Allen transferred to play for the Tennessee State Tigers from 2022 to 2023. He appeared in 10 games, all starts, in 2022, accumulating 36 tackles, 4.5 sacks, and two pass breakups, earning first-team All-OVC honors. He played in all 11 games in 2023, recording 65 tackles (including 28 for loss), 14.5 sacks, five forced fumbles, and one fumble recovery. Allen led the FCS in both sacks and tackles-for-loss. He was also named Big South-OVC Defensive Player of the Year and first-team All Big South-OVC Defense. He won the Buck Buchanan Award as the best FCS defensive player.

Allen transferred to play for the Tulane Green Wave in 2024.

== Professional career ==
Pre-draft measurables
Height	Weight
5 ft 11 3/4 in (1.82 m)	275 lb (125 kg)
Values from Pro Day
