= Hawthorne, Florida =

- City
- City of Hawthorne
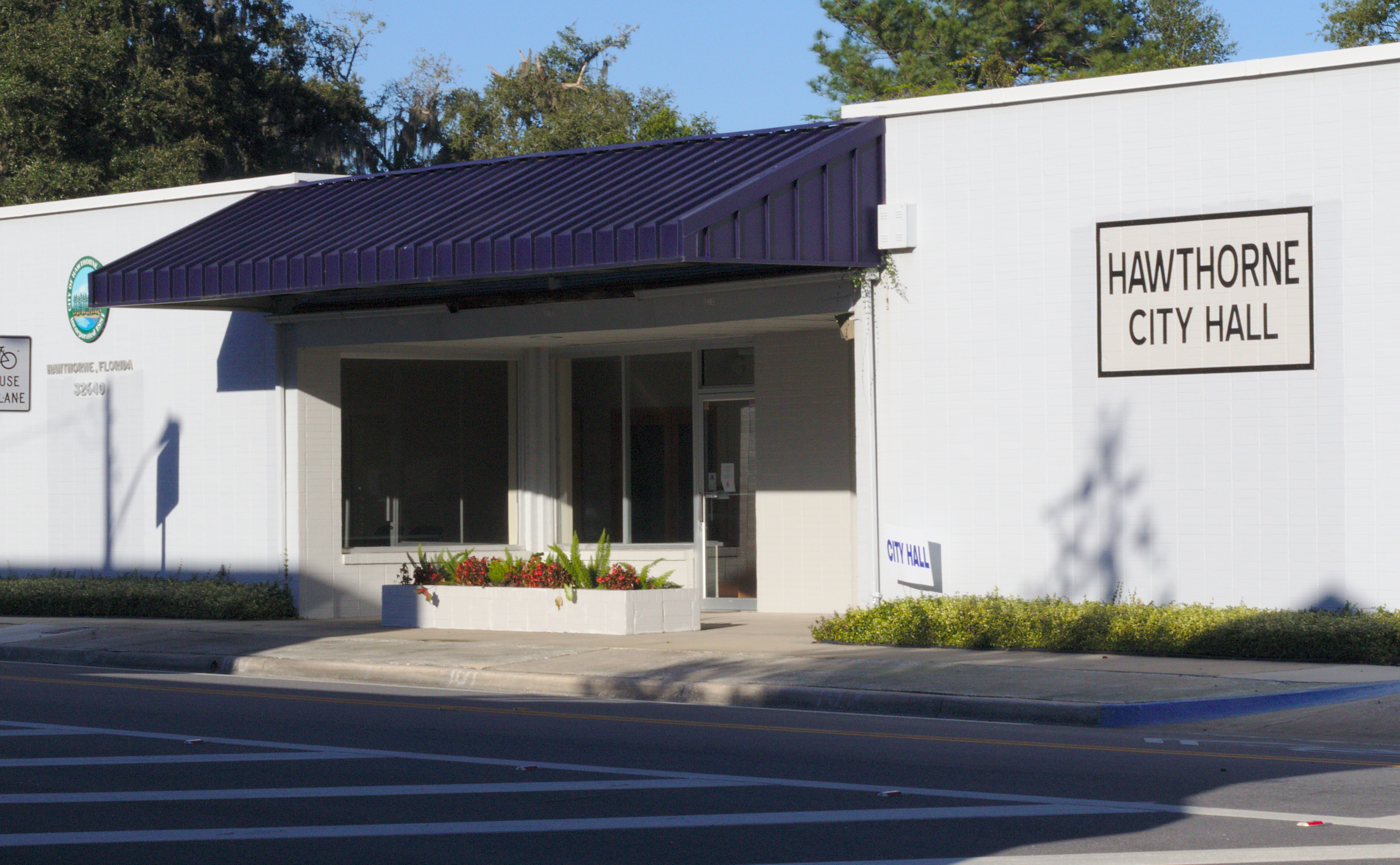
- Hawthorne City Hall, 2018

- Seal

- Location in Alachua County and the state of Florida
- Coordinates: 29°36′12″N 82°06′45″W
- Country: United States
- State: Florida
- County: Alachua
- Settled (Waits Crossing–Jamestown): c. 1854-Late 1870s
- Incorporated (City of Hawthorn): June 23, 1881
- Incorporated (City of Hawthorne): 1950

Government
  - Type: Commission–Manager
  - Mayor: Jacquelyn Randall
  - Vice Mayor: Patricia Bouie-Hutchinson
  - Commissioners: Tommie C. Howard Jr., Raymond Cue, and Randy Martin
  - City Manager: Robert Thompson
  - City Clerk: LaKesha Hawkins-McGruder

Area
  - Total: 7.64 sq mi (19.79 km^{2})
  - Land: 7.38 sq mi (19.11 km^{2})
  - Water: 0.26 sq mi (0.68 km^{2})
- Elevation: 144 ft (44 m)

Population (2020)
  - Total: 1,478
  - Density: 200.3/sq mi (77.33/km^{2})
- Time zone: UTC-5 (Eastern (EST))
  - Summer (DST): UTC-4 (EDT)
- ZIP code: 32640
- Area code: 352
- FIPS code: 12-29275
- GNIS feature ID: 2404666
- Website: www.cityofhawthorne.net

Hawthorne (/ˈhɔːθoʊrn/) is a city in Alachua County, Florida, United States, incorporated in 1881. Indigenous peoples of the Americas had been living in the area since around 100 CE; Hawthorne grew around their trading trails. Throughout its history, Hawthorne has been known for its agriculture, railroad, and rural lifestyle. Hawthorne's population was 1,478 at the 2020 census, up from 1,417 at the 2010 census, with an area of 7.38 sq mi (19.1 km^{2}). It is part of the Gainesville, Florida Metropolitan Statistical Area.

== History ==
People have been living in the Hawthorne area since the mid-Woodland period; a Cades Pond culture (100–600 CE) mound is near the city, and an Alachua culture (600–1700 CE) campsite was found in Hawthorne with aboriginal ceramics and lithics. Timucua-speaking natives were living in North Florida when the Spanish arrived during the 16th century. Natives in Alachua County were allied with Chief Potano, and those in Palatka were allied with Chief Utina. In 1774, William Bartram traveled between western Alachua County and the Palatka area on what he called an "old Spanish highway", an "old Indian and trading trail" which passed through the Hawthorne area. Hawthorne's history is tied to its crossroads.

A road between Micanopy and Palatka via the Hawthorne area appears on an 1837 map. During the 1840s, a mill was constructed on Little Orange Creek, 1.5 miles (2.4 km) east of the center of present-day Hawthorne. The Pleasant Grove Baptist Church was founded at this time, and a post office opened at the mill in 1854. In 1869, the area's first school opened in a log cabin.

Phosphate was discovered near Hawthorne during the late 1870s. Near the same time, the first subdivision was platted. The area had been previously known as Jamestown, named after James M. Hawthorn. A second subdivision, Waits Crossing, was platted in 1881. The subdivisions provided north–south and east–west rights-of-way, which brought rail service. Track was first laid by the Peninsula Railroad in Hawthorne in 1879 for a north–south line intended to connect Waldo and Ocala. Near the same time, track laid by the Florida Southern Railroad reached Hawthorne; its east–west line was intended to connect Palatka and Gainesville. Each railroad company had a depot in the Hawthorne area, about a half-mile apart. A Hawthorn post office was established in 1880, and its spelling was changed to Hawthorne in 1950.

On June 23, 1881, 36 years after Florida became a state, the state legislature officially created the municipal corporation as the City of Hawthorn (and in 1950, it was officially named the "City of Hawthorne", with the "e" added to Hawthorne). Florida Southern began selling land granted to it by the state almost a decade after the railroads were built, including land in Hawthorne described as "in the heart of a famous vegetable region ... large public school, churches, stores, hotels, three cotton gins, wagon repair shop." At this time, Hawthorne was known for its hunting and fishing and "Northern sportsmen frequented the area to enjoy" it. Sportsmen could stay at William Shepard Moore's hotel; he served breakfast early and had hunting dogs, guides, and horses available.

During the 1880s many orange groves were planted in the Hawthorne area, but after the 1894 Great Freeze ruined citrus trees, growers switched to vegetables; the area became known for Sea Island cotton (Pima cotton) around the turn of the 20th century although it had been grown there since at least the early 1880s. The boll weevil halted the cotton trade, however, and Hawthorne diversified into brickmaking, other agriculture, turpentine production, and railroad work. Because two rail lines crossed in the city, it became a transfer point; there was no passenger station, however, and travelers had to walk (or ride) to the connecting line's depot. The Florida state railroad commission declared that the depots were inadequate to accommodate the "traveling public", and required the rail companies to build a segregated union passenger station in Hawthorne by November 1912. Hawthorne was a bustling community in 1913 with a cotton gin, a bank, four general stores, a drug store, three hotels, and two furniture stores.

The city experienced a boom during the 1920s; by late in the decade, Hawthorne had a bank, high school, ice and electric plants, a Western Union, a Railway Express Agency, and a telephone exchange. Although the city suffered during the Great Depression, daily rail service continued; Highway 20 was paved, and a bridge was built over the railroad tracks. The area remained an agricultural center.

The original city hall burned during the mid-to-late 1930s and was replaced by a "white stucco building with Mediterranean influence", which was Hawthorne's city hall until 2018. That year, the city hall moved down the street to an old bank building on the corner of County Road 2082, and the old city hall building began use as a community center.

During the 1940s, agriculture declined because the land had not been replenished. The pulpwood industry began when National Container (a box company later purchased by Owens-Illinois) bought 15,000 acres (6,100 ha) in the area. A state forest was created south of Hawthorne with 40,000 acres (16,000 ha) of purchased land. While there was not much growth after World War II, Hawthorne was still a center for hunting and fishing. Little growth occurred in the 1950s and 1960s; Hawthorne was known for its lima beans, and more farmland was sold to lumber companies. Trees were still tapped for turpentine before that industry ended in the late 1950s. US 301, built during the early 1960s, bypassed downtown Hawthorne to reduce driving times.

Growth revived somewhat during the 1970s. As automobiles became the dominant means of transportation, passenger trains and buses stopped serving the city. Many residents began commuting to Gainesville to work after local industries declined. The area's rural lifestyle became appreciated during the 1980s, although local jobs still existed at sand mines, chicken ranches, and plywood mills. Since the 1980s, Hawthorne has experienced little population growth. (Note: See historical population table in demographics section.)

The city of Hawthorne annexed approximately 1,300 acres owned by Plum Creek Land Company in 2015.

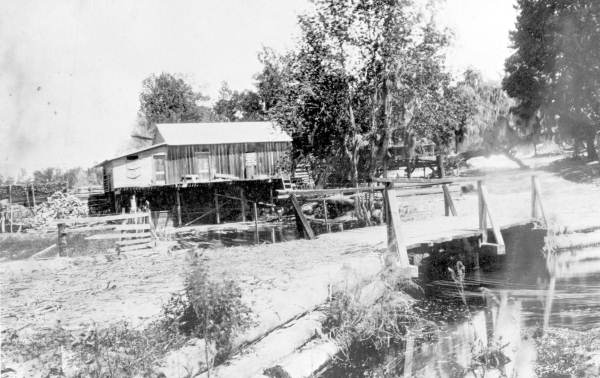
Morrison's Mill, c. 1850

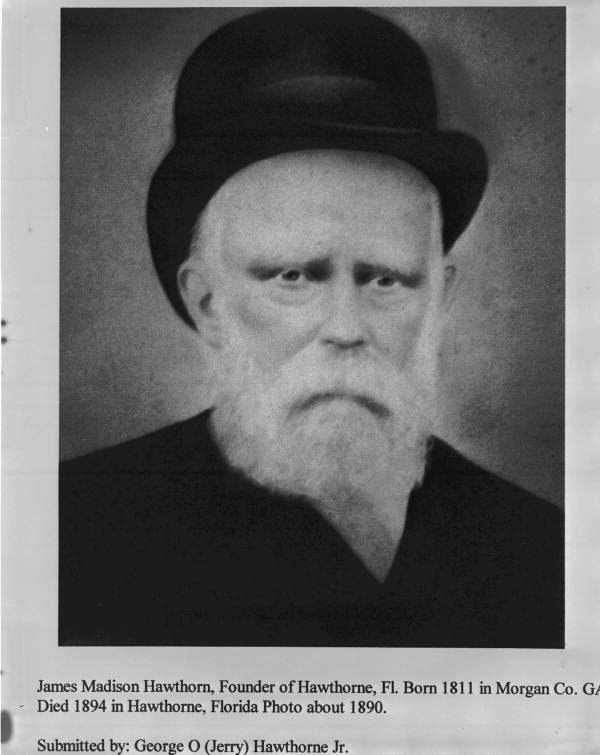
James M. Hawthorn, c. 1890

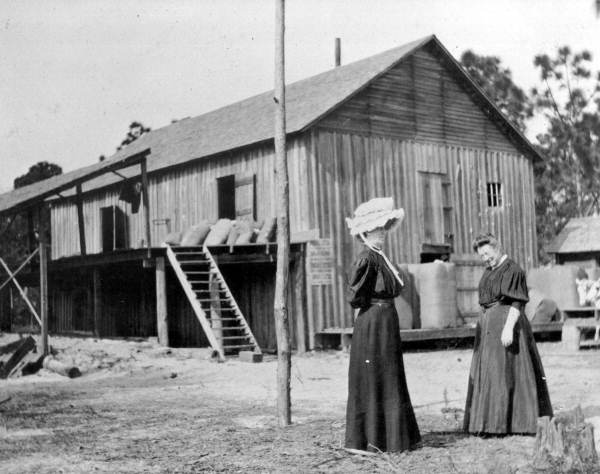
Cotton gin, c. 1900

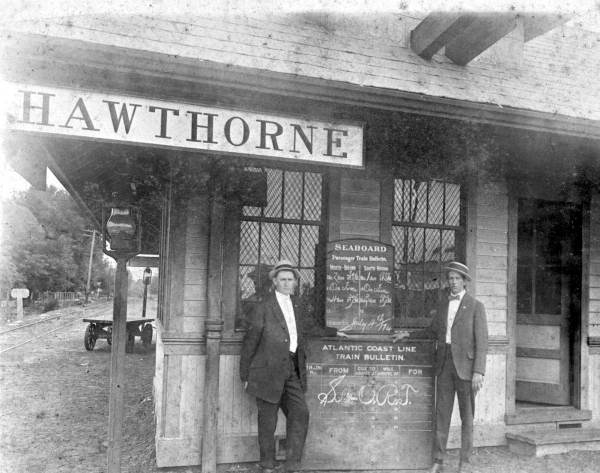
Railroad station, 1914

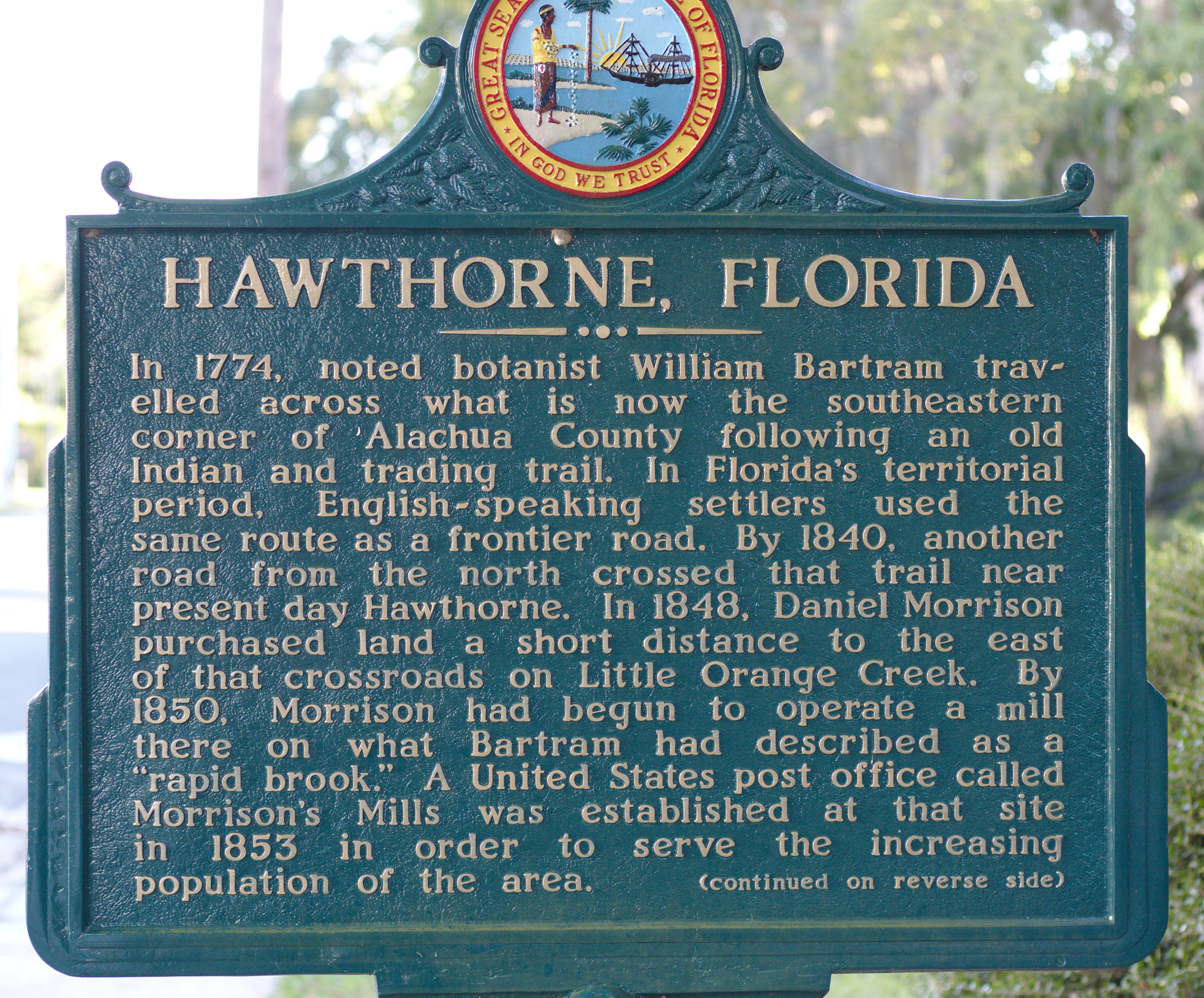
Historical marker, front

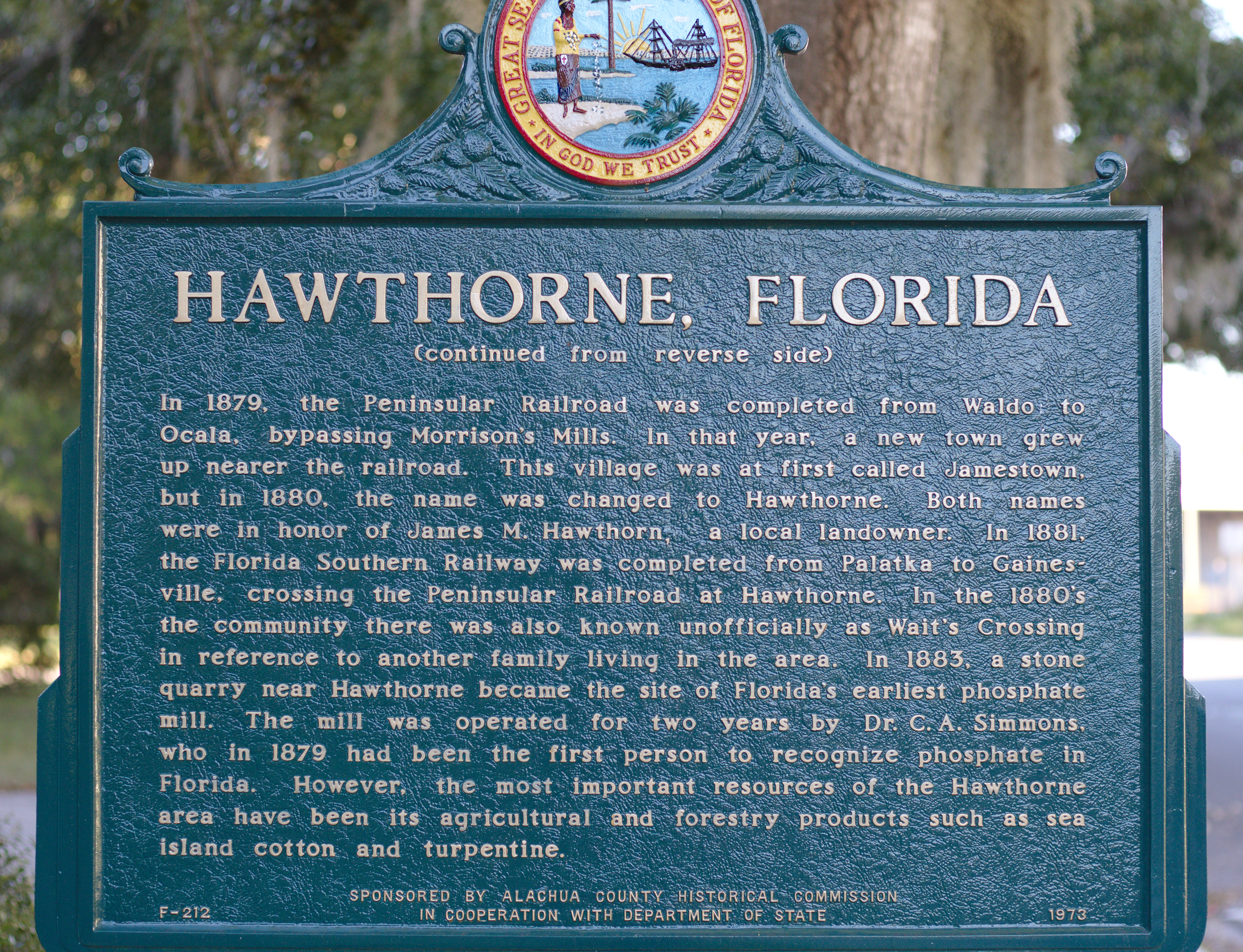
Historical marker, reverse

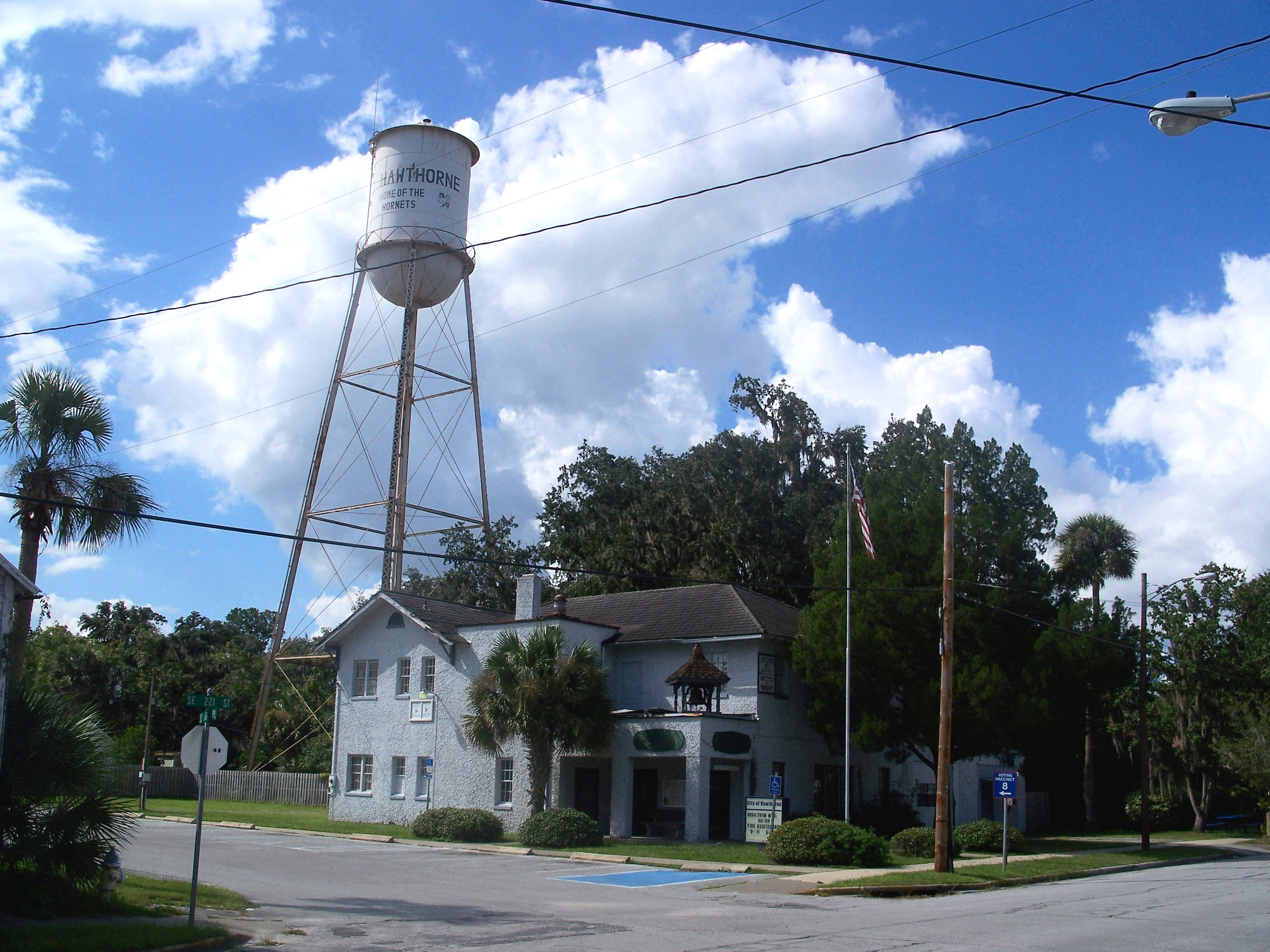
Old city hall, c. 2008

== Geography ==
Hawthorne is on the eastern boundary of Alachua County, and a portion of the city borders the Alachua–Putnam county line. It is 17 miles (27 km) east of Gainesville, the largest city in the county. According to the United States Census Bureau, the city has a total area of 7.06 sq mi (18.3 km^{2}); 6.802 sq mi (17.62 km^{2}) is land, and 0.258 sq mi (0.67 km^{2}) is water.

=== Climate ===
The climate in this area is characterized by hot, humid summers and generally mild winters. According to the Köppen climate classification, the City of Hawthorne has a humid subtropical climate zone (Cfa).

== Demographics ==
Historical population
Census	Pop.	Note	%±
1900	296		—
1910	324		9.5%
1920	543		67.6%
1930	600		10.5%
1940	741		23.5%
1950	1,058		42.8%
1960	1,167		10.3%
1970	1,126		−3.5%
1980	1,303		15.7%
1990	1,305		0.2%
2000	1,415		8.4%
2010	1,417		0.1%
2020	1,478		4.3%
U.S. Decennial Census

=== Racial and ethnic composition ===
Hawthorne racial composition (Hispanics excluded from racial categories) (NH = Non-Hispanic)
Race	Pop 2010	Pop 2020	% 2010	% 2020
White (NH)	724	569	51.09%	38.50%
Black or African American (NH)	640	738	45.17%	49.93%
Native American or Alaska Native (NH)	1	7	0.07%	0.47%
Asian (NH)	4	14	0.28%	0.95%
Pacific Islander or Native Hawaiian (NH)	0	0	0.00%	0.00%
Some other race (NH)	2	17	0.14%	1.15%
Two or more races/Multiracial (NH)	17	63	1.20%	4.26%
Hispanic or Latino (any race)	29	70	2.05%	4.74%
Total	1,417	1,478	100.00%	100.00%

=== 2020 census ===
As of the 2020 census, Hawthorne had a population of 1,478. The median age was 37.4 years. 27.6% of residents were under the age of 18 and 17.4% were 65 years of age or older. For every 100 females there were 89.7 males, and for every 100 females age 18 and over there were 86.1 males age 18 and over.

0.0% of residents lived in urban areas, while 100.0% lived in rural areas.

There were 525 households in Hawthorne, of which 37.9% had children under the age of 18 living in them. Of all households, 39.2% were married-couple households, 17.5% were households with a male householder and no spouse or partner present, and 37.5% were households with a female householder and no spouse or partner present. About 25.3% of all households were made up of individuals and 12.7% had someone living alone who was 65 years of age or older.

There were 609 housing units, of which 13.8% were vacant. The homeowner vacancy rate was 2.7% and the rental vacancy rate was 8.0%.

Hawthorne Comparative Demographics 2013–2017 American Community Survey 5-Year Estimates
	Hawthorne	Alachua County	Florida	United States
Owner-occupied housing, median value	$127,900	$167,000	$178,700	$193,500
Median household income	$37,500	$45,478	$50,883	$57,652
Individuals below poverty level	29.0%	23.3%	15.5%	14.6%
High school degree or higher	82.0%	92.1%	87.6%	87.3%
Bachelor's degree or higher	18.9%	41.4%	28.5%	30.9%
Foreign born	2.26%	9.97%	20.25%	13.14%
Veterans	6.39%	5.95%	7.17%	5.9%

According to the 2012-2016 American Community Survey, median household income in the city was $37,500 and median family income was $46,875. Hawthorne's per capita income was $14,353. About 25.5% of families and 29.0% of the population were below the poverty line, including 34.8% of those under age 18 and 16.6% of those aged 65 or over.

In the 2016-2020 American Community Survey 5-year estimates, there were 292 families residing in the city.

=== 2010 census ===
As of the 2010 United States census, there were 1,417 people, 535 households, and 351 families residing in the city.

In 2010, the population density was 295.2 inhabitants per square mile (114.0/km^{2}). There were 681 housing units, with an average density of 141.9 per square mile (54.8/km^{2}).

In 2010, there were 535 households, out of which 31.6% had children under the age of 18 living with them, 38.3% were married couples living together, 21.0% had a female householder with no husband present, and 36.4% were non-families. 31.4% of all households were made up of individuals and 12.0% had someone living alone who was 65 years of age or older. The average household size was 2.534 and the average family size was 3.15.

In 2010, in the city, the population was spread out with 23.2% under the age of 18, 2.4% from 18 to 21, 52.9% from 21 to 62, and 20.1% who were 62 years of age or older. The median age was 41.5 years. For every 100 females, there were 86.2 males. For every 100 females age 18 and over, there were 86.6 males.

=== 2000 census ===
As of the census of 2000, there were 1,415 people, 537 households, and 374 families residing in the city. The population density was 170.7/km^{2} (442/mi^{2}). There were 598 housing units at an average density of 72.2/km^{2} (187/mi^{2}). The racial makeup of the city was 50.39% White, 48.06% African American, 0.14% Native American, 0.07% Asian, 0.21% from other races, and 1.13% from two or more races. Hispanic or Latino of any race were 1.41% of the population.

In 2000, there were 537 households out of which 30.4% had children under the age of 18 living with them, 43.9% were married couples living together, 21.4% had a female householder with no husband present, and 30.2% were non-families. 26.3% of all households were made up of individuals and 14.0% had someone living alone who was 65 years of age or older. The average household size was 2.64 and the average family size was 3.19.

In 2000, in the city the population was spread out with 28.3% under the age of 18, 8.3% from 18 to 24, 23.7% from 25 to 44, 22.4% from 45 to 64, and 17.2% who were 65 years of age or older. The median age was 38 years. For every 100 females there were 86.2 males. For every 100 females age 18 and over, there were 81.3 males.

In 2000, the median income for a household in the city was $26,008, and the median income for a family was $31,172. Males had a median income of $25,833 versus $20,104 for females. The per capita income for the city was $14,592. About 19.5% of families and 23.8% of the population were below the poverty line, including 39.0% of those under age 18 and 13.3% of those age 65 or over.

== Government ==
Hawthorne is chartered as a commission–manager form of government. The charter officers are the city commission, with five commissioners, a mayor, and a vice-mayor. A city manager is responsible to the commission for the administration of all city affairs.

Since 2021, the mayor of Hawthorne is Jacquelyn Randall.

== Attractions ==
Hawthorne obtained 3,000 acres (1,200 ha) surrounding Little Orange Creek (where a historic mill operated) in 2011. The Little Orange Creek Nature Park opened in 2017. Managed by the city, it is divided into two sections. About 65 acres (26 ha) south of State Road 20 are the nature park, and include parking and an environmental-education and event center. North of State Road 20 are 2,800 acres (1,100 ha) which are "preserved as a conservation area for local plants and wildlife". The preserve has public trails for hiking, bicycling, and horseback riding.

The city also owns and maintains Lindsey Phillips Park, off US Highway 301. The park (on Johnson Lake) has a boat ramp, fishing pier, playground, and picnic facilities.

Several conservation areas are south and west of Hawthorne. Immediately adjacent to the city is the over-11,000-acre (4,500 ha) Lochloosa Wildlife Management Area. Its Cross Creek Trail is part of the Great Florida Birding and Wildlife Trail. Lochloosa Wildlife Management Area provides opportunities for hiking, bicycling, horseback riding, hunting, fishing, canoeing, and boating.

Marjorie Kinnan Rawlings Historic State Park, about fourteen miles southwest of Hawthorne, maintains the "authentic Florida cracker homestead" where Rawlings lived and wrote her Pulitzer Prize-winning books. Although Rawlings did not live in Hawthorne, she used the Hawthorne post office and received mail addressed to "Hawthorn".

== Sports ==
The city owns and maintains Hawthorne Athletic Park, which has four dual-use baseball-softball fields, a multi-purpose field, a playground, concession stand, and picnic facility. A non-profit organization, Hawthorne Youth Sports, offers a variety of sports for children in the area: baseball, softball, t-ball, tackle football, soccer, basketball, and cheerleading. The Hawthorne Hornets football team, coached by former NFL player Cornelius Ingram, plays at the Hawthorne High School football stadium. In 2018, the city opened a wellness center adjacent to Hawthorne Athletic Park; most of the gym members are senior citizens.

== Infrastructure ==
=== Transportation ===
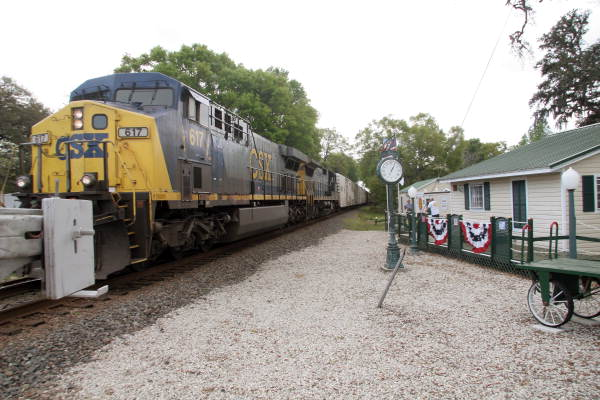
CSX train in Hawthorne

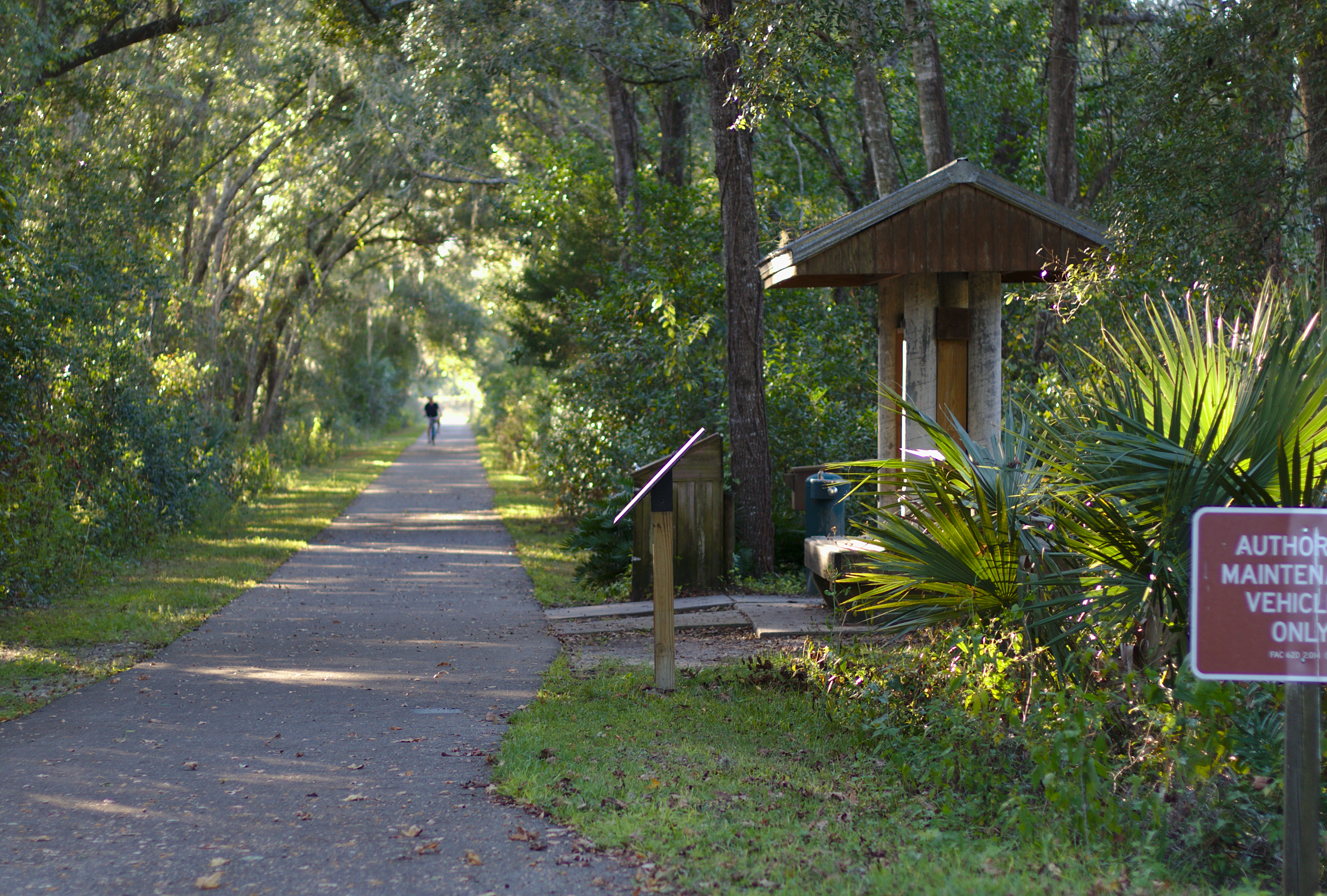
Hawthorne entrance to the Gainesville-Hawthorne State Trail

The city sits at the intersection of US Highway 301 and Florida State Road 20.

CSX Transportation owns the north–south rail line which runs through Hawthorne, and operates a station. The line, part of the Wildwood Subdivision, is used for freight. Its Edgar spur runs from Hawthorne to Edgar (near Interlachen), and the 1912 railroad station is used as a business.

The Gainesville-Hawthorne State Trail connects Gainesville to Hawthorne with a sixteen-mile, paved trail. The trail runs through conservation areas in Alachua County that features wetlands, upland hammocks, and pine flatwoods, and can be used for walking, cycling, and (in parts) horseback riding. It was created through the Rails-to-Trails program, which converted the abandoned railroad between Hawthorne and Gainesville to a recreational trail.

=== Utilities ===
The Department of Public Works provides solid-waste pickup (including recyclable items), potable water, and a sewer system with wastewater services. Electrical power is provided by Florida Power & Light and the Clay Electric Cooperative.

=== Healthcare ===
Medical services are provided by Azalea Health, which operates a clinic in the city. Fifteen hospitals are within 30 miles (48 km) of Hawthorne. The closest are in Gainesville: Shands Hospital, North Florida/South Georgia Veteran Affairs Health Care System, and the North Florida Regional Medical Center. To the east, Putnam Community Medical Center is available for Hawthorne residents who are closer to Palatka. Florida Hospital Ocala and Ocala Regional Medical Center are in Ocala, south of Hawthorne.

In August 2018, Shands Hospital was the only Level I trauma center in Alachua County and its eight adjacent counties. Ocala Regional Medical Center in Marion County and Orange Park Medical Center in Clay County offer Level II trauma services.

=== Emergency services ===
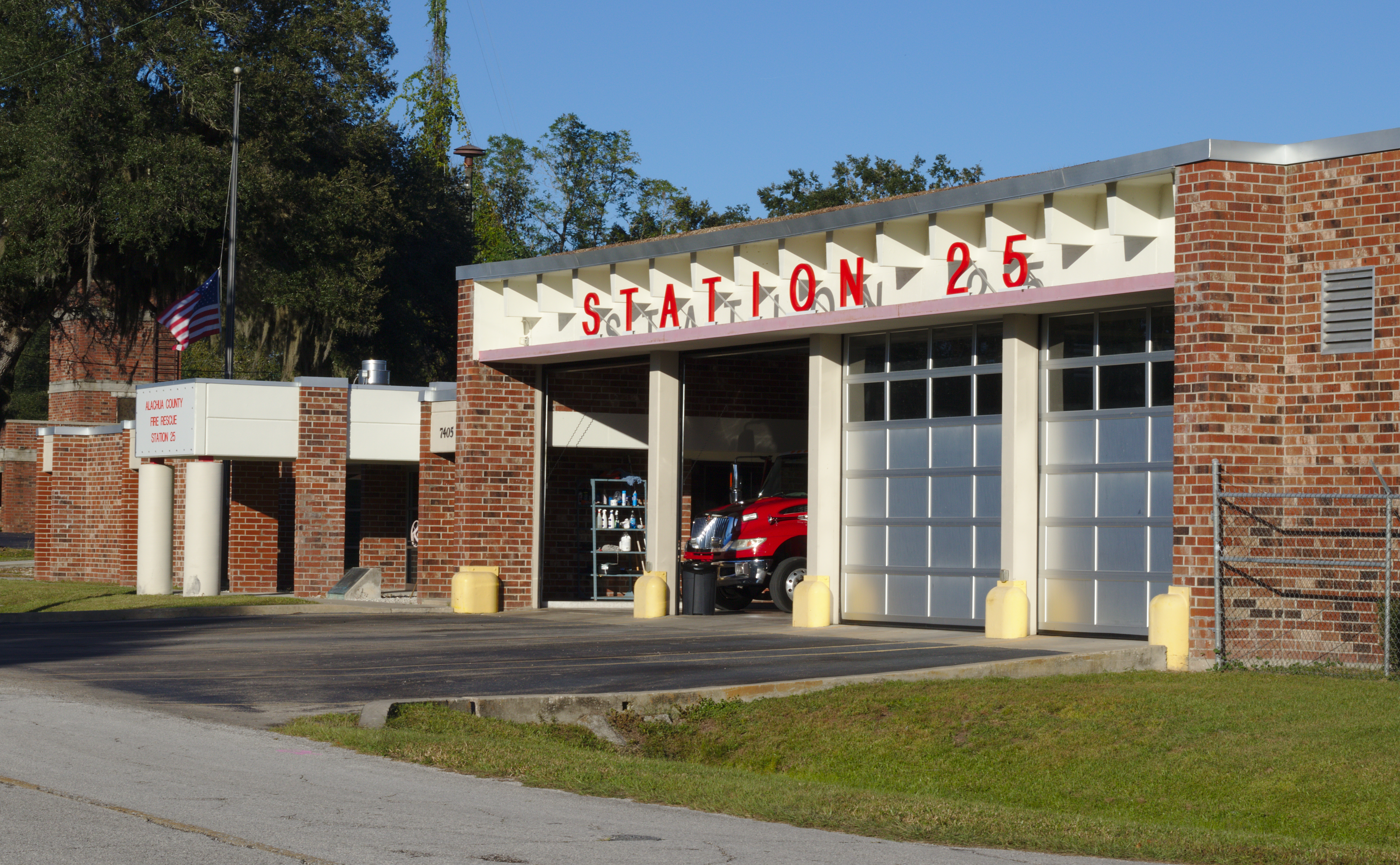
Alachua County Fire Rescue Station 25

Law enforcement in Hawthorne is provided by the Alachua County Sheriff's Office, and emergency services are provided by Alachua County Fire Rescue. In 2015, Alachua County Fire Rescue Station 62 moved into a renovated station in Hawthorne. The station (number 25) houses a fire engine, rescue ambulance, brush truck, and tanker.

== Education ==
Hawthorne is served by the Alachua County Public Schools, which operates Shell Elementary School and Hawthorne Middle/High School. The Alachua County Library District has a branch library in the city. The elementary school was named after Chester Shell, who spearheaded a campaign to open a school for Black children in Hawthorne. The school for Black students opened in 1922 as Hawthorne High School. Schools at that location were known as Hawthorne High School, Shell High School, Shell Middle School, and Shell Elementary School.

== Media ==
Television stations available over the air in Hawthorne are WUFT PBS, WOGX Fox, WCJB-TV ABC, WGFL CBS, and WYME-CD MeTV. There are 22 AM and FM radio stations within a 25-mile (40 km) radius of the city. The Gainesville Sun, The Independent Florida Alligator, and Alachua County Today are local newspapers.

== Notable people ==
- Bo Diddley, musician
- James B. Edwards, Governor of South Carolina
- Cornelius Ingram, NFL player
- D. R. "Billy" Matthews, Congressman from North Florida (1953–1965)

== Sources ==
- "2018 U.S. Gazetteer Files". United States Census Bureau.
- "Alachua County". Jim Forte Postal History.
- "Alachua County Fire Rescue Department History". www.alachuacounty.us. Archived from the original on November 15, 2018.
- "Alachua County Sheriff's Office". www.alachuasheriff.org.
- "American FactFinder". United States Census Bureau.
- Annual Report of the Railroad Commission of the State of Florida, Volumes 11-17. The Commission. 1908.
- Bartram, William (April 30, 2012). Travels of William Bartram. Courier Corporation. ISBN 9780486138664.
- "Hawthorne appoints Jacquelyn Randall as mayor". WCJB. July 26, 2021.
- Capace, Nancy (2001). Encyclopedia of Mississippi. Somerset Publishers, Inc. ISBN 9780403096039.
- Capace, Nancy (2000). Encyclopedia of South Carolina Volume 1 of Encyclopedia of the United States. Somerset Publishers, Inc. ISBN 9780403093472.
- "Census of Population and Housing". Census.gov.
- "2020 Census (P.L. 94-171) Redistricting Data Summary Files". Census.gov.
- Census Reports Tenth Census: Report on cotton production in the United States; and also embracing agricultural and physico-geographical descriptions of the several cotton states and of California Volume 6 of Census Reports Tenth Census, United States. Census Office. United States. Census Office. U.S. Government Printing Office. 1884. p. 13.
- "Chester Shell Elementary School".
- "City Hall, Hawthorne, Fla". ufdc.ufl.edu.
- "The Commission-Manager Form of Government" (PDF).
- "Community Center Hawthorne FL". www.cityofhawthorne.net.
- "CSX Printable System Map". CSX Corporation.
- "DTV Reception Maps". Federal Communications Commission. for zip code 32640
- Cunningham, Ron. "Exploring Florida on two wheels". Gainesville Sun.
- "Dataset Alachua County Property Appraiser GIS". data-acpa.opendata.arcgis.com.
- Downing, R.R. (January 1, 2005). "CSX Transportation Jacksonville Division Timetable No. 4" (PDF). Multimodalways Project.
- "Elected Officials: Municipalities". www.votealachua.com. October 29, 2018.
- "Florida Electric Industry Maps" (PDF). Florida Municipal Electric Association. 2010. Archived from the original (PDF) on October 31, 2018.
- "Florida Fact". news.google.com. Ocala Star-Banner – via Google News Archive Search.
- "Florida Newspapers - Florida Newspaper List". www.usnpl.com.
- Florida, State Library and Archives of. "View of the National Container Corporation mill near the railroad tracks in Jacksonville, Florida". Florida Memory.
- "Florida Trauma Centers" (PDF).
- Fuller, Josephine (February 14, 2019). "Seniors At Hawthorne Wellness Center Keep Their Minds And Bodies Healthy". WUFT.
- "Gainesville-Hawthorne State Park Trail Florida Trails TrailLink.com". www.traillink.com.
- "Gainesville-Hawthorne State Trail". Florida State Parks.
- Grady-Weil, Julia (October 17, 2019). "Hawthorne Climbs Back With $27 Million Makeover". WUFT.
- "A Guide to the Donald Ray (Billy) Matthews Papers". www.library.ufl.edu.
- "Hawthorne Alachua County Library District". www.aclib.us.
- "Hawthorne - Azalea Health". azahealth.org.
- areavibes. "Hawthorne, FL Crime Rates & Crime Map". AreaVibes.
- Hawthorne, Florida, Marker Back (plaque outside First Baptist Church). Hawthorne, Florida: Alachua County Historical Commission in Cooperation with Department of State. 1973.
- Hawthorne, Florida, Marker Front (plaque outside First Baptist Church). Hawthorne, Florida: Alachua County Historical Commission in Cooperation with Department of State. 1973.
- "Hawthorne Historical Marker". July 23, 2017.
- Hawthorne R & T (textual record), Tallahassee, Florida, US: Florida Master Site File, Florida Department of State, Division of Historical Resource, Bureau of Historic Preservation, November 1990, AL02562, archived from the original on November 3, 2018
- Historic Hawthorne Florida Survey and Plan (Report). University of Florida. July 1996.
- Hemmings, E. Thomas (December 1978). "Cades Pond Subsistence, Settlement, and Ceremonialism". The Florida Anthropologist. 31 (4).
- "History". Friends of Little Orange Creek. October 1, 2012.
- "Home". hys.youthsports.tripod.com.
- "Hospitals in hawthorne, florida - US Hospital Finder". www.ushospitalfinder.com.
- Kimble, Josh. "Jacquelyn Randall wins election for Hawthorne City Commission seat". WCJB.
- Kisling, Vernon N. Jr. (January 2014). "Marjorie Kinnan Rawlings and the Cross Creek Mail" (PDF). Florida Postal History Society Journal. 21 (1): 1, 3–5.
- LaPeer, Scott. "HIGH SCHOOL FOOTBALL SPOTLIGHT: Hawthorne Hornets". Gainesville Sun.
- Lee, Williams J. (1837). Map of Florida, 1837 (Map) – via RICHES of Central Florida.
- "Lochloosa Wildlife Conservation Area GFBWT". floridabirdingtrail.com.
- "Lochloosa Wildlife Management Area". myfwc.com.
- Longstreth, James W. (1976). Alachua County Schools and How They Got Their Names. Alachua County School Board.
- "Marjorie Kinnan Rawlings Historic State Park". Florida State Parks.
- Matthew, Northrup & Co. (1888). Map of Florida Showing the Land Grant of the Florida Southern Railway (Map) – via RICHES of Central Florida.
- Milanich, Jerald T. (1996). Timucua. VNR AG. ISBN 9781557864888.
- "Municode Library". library.municode.com.
- "Parks". www.cityofhawthorne.net.
- "Public Works". www.cityofhawthorne.net.
- Pickard, John B. (2001). Historic Alachua County and old Gainesville : a tour guide to the past. Gainesville, FL: Alachua Press. ISBN 978-0967278865. OCLC 50765140.
- "Radio Stations in 32640". radio-locator.com.
- Ramakers, Johan (October 10, 2016). "Bo Diddley 6/2008 - Rock and Roll Paradise". Rock and Roll Paradise.
- Sargent, Alex. "Once the hub of Hawthorne, Little Orange Creek prepares to shine". Gainesville Sun.
- Savage, Larry. "Former Gator Ingram named head coach at alma mater". Gainesville Sun.
- "Schools & Centers Directory / All Schools & Centers". www.sbac.edu.
- "Stations". www.alachuacounty.us. Archived from the original on November 15, 2018.
- "Straight-Line Diagrams Online GIS Web Application". www2.dot.state.fl.us. Archived from the original on March 6, 2014.
- "Surviving Florida Railroad Stations" (PDF). American-Rails.com.
- "Trauma System Florida Department of Health". www.floridahealth.gov.
- "US Board on Geographic Names". United States Geological Survey. October 25, 2007.
- WCJB. "Hawthorne opens new downtown city hall".
- WCJB. "NCFL city welcomes wellness center".
- Webber, Carl (1883). The Eden of the South (Electronic reproduction). New York: Leve & Alden. pp. 60–61. LCCN 01021712.
