= 2024 Navy Midshipmen football team =

American college football season

2024 Navy Midshipmen football

Armed Forces Bowl champion

Armed Forces Bowl, W 21–20 vs. Oklahoma
- Conference: American Athletic Conference
- Record: 10–3 (6–2 AAC)
- Head coach: Brian Newberry (2nd season)
- Offensive coordinator: Drew Cronic (1st season)
- Offensive scheme: Wing-T
- Defensive coordinator: P. J. Volker (2nd season)
- Base defense: 4–2–5
- Home stadium: Navy–Marine Corps Memorial Stadium

2024 American Athletic Conference football standings
	Conf.			Overall
Team	W		L	W		L
No. 21 Army y$	8	–	0	12	–	2
Tulane y	7	–	1	9	–	5
Navy	6	–	2	10	–	3
No. 24 Memphis	6	–	2	11	–	2
East Carolina	5	–	3	8	–	5
South Florida	4	–	4	7	–	6
UTSA	4	–	4	7	–	6
Charlotte	4	–	4	5	–	7
North Texas	3	–	5	6	–	7
Rice	3	–	5	4	–	8
Temple	2	–	6	3	–	9
UAB	2	–	6	3	–	9
Florida Atlantic	1	–	7	3	–	9
Tulsa	1	–	7	3	–	9
Championship: Army 35, Tulane 14
$ – Conference champion; y – Championship game participant; Rankings from AP Poll

The 2024 Navy Midshipmen football team represented the United States Naval Academy in the American Athletic Conference (AAC) during the 2024 NCAA Division I FBS football season. The Midshipmen were led by Brian Newberry in his second year as the head coach. The Midshipmen played their home games at Navy–Marine Corps Memorial Stadium in Annapolis, Maryland.

Despite being picked to finish eleventh in the American Athletic Conference, the Midshipmen instead exceeded their low expectations, finishing 10–3 for their first winning season and first bowl appearance and win since 2019.

== Preseason ==
=== AAC media poll ===
The American Athletic Conference released its media prediction poll on July 23, 2024. The Midshipmen were predicted to finish eleventh in the conference.

== Schedule ==
Date	Time	Opponent	Rank	Site	TV	Result	Attendance
August 31	12:00 p.m.	Bucknell*		Navy–Marine Corps Memorial Stadium; Annapolis, MD	CBSSN	W 49–21	28,763
September 7	3:30 p.m.	Temple		Navy–Marine Corps Memorial Stadium; Annapolis, MD	CBSSN	W 38–11	28,889
September 21	3:30 p.m.	Memphis		Navy–Marine Corps Memorial Stadium; Annapolis, MD	CBSSN	W 56–44	31,268
September 28	12:00 p.m.	at UAB		Protective Stadium; Birmingham, AL	ESPN2	W 41–18	21,536
October 5	12:00 p.m.	at Air Force*		Falcon Stadium; USAF Academy, CO (Commander-in-Chief's Trophy)	CBS	W 34–7	39,441
October 19	3:30 p.m.	Charlotte^{†}	No. 25	Navy–Marine Corps Memorial Stadium; Annapolis, MD	CBSSN	W 51–17	35,094
October 26	12:00 p.m.	vs. No. 12 Notre Dame*	No. 24	MetLife Stadium; East Rutherford, NJ (rivalry)	ABC	L 14–51	76,112
November 2	4:00 p.m.	at Rice		Rice Stadium; Houston, TX	ESPN2	L 10–24	21,253
November 9	12:00 p.m.	at South Florida		Raymond James Stadium; Tampa, FL	ESPN2	W 28–7	34,091
November 16	12:00 p.m.	No. 25 Tulane		Navy–Marine Corps Memorial Stadium; Annapolis, MD	ESPN2	L 0–35	38,914
November 29	12:00 p.m.	at East Carolina		Dowdy–Ficklen Stadium; Greenville, NC	ESPN	W 34–20	35,663
December 14	3:00 p.m.	vs. No. 22 Army*		Northwest Stadium; Landover, MD (Army–Navy Game, Commander-in-Chief's Trophy)	CBS	W 31–13	60,726
December 27	12:00 p.m.	vs. Oklahoma*		Amon G. Carter Stadium; Fort Worth, TX (Armed Forces Bowl)	ESPN	W 21–20	50,754
*Non-conference game; ^{†}Homecoming; Rankings from AP Poll - Released prior to game; All times are in Eastern time

== Rankings ==
Ranking movements Legend: ██ Increase in ranking ██ Decrease in ranking — = Not ranked RV = Received votes
	Week																
Poll	Pre	1	2	3	4	5	6	7	8	9	10	11	12	13	14	15	Final
AP	—	—	—	—	RV	RV	RV	25	24	RV	—	—	—	—	—	—	RV
Coaches	—	—	—	—	RV	RV	RV	RV	24	RV	—	RV	—	—	—	—	RV
CFP	Not released										—	—	—	—	—	—	Not released

== Game summaries ==
=== Bucknell (FCS) ===
Bucknell Bison (FCS) (0–0) at Navy Midshipmen (0–0) – Game summary

Quarter	1	2	3	4	Total
Bison (FCS)	7	0	7	7	21
Midshipmen	6	22	7	14	49

at Navy–Marine Corps Memorial Stadium • Annapolis, Maryland

- Date: August 31st
- Game time: 12:00 p.m. EDT
- Game weather: Cloudy • Temperature: 78 °F (26 °C) • Wind: SE at 9 miles per hour (14 km/h)
- Game attendance: 28,763
- Referee: Steven Anderson
- TV announcers (CBSSN): Carter Blackburn (play-by-play), Randy Cross (analyst), and Sheehan Stanwick-Burch (sideline reporter)

Game information

First quarter

- (13:37) BUCK – Nate Anderson 47 yard pass from Ralph Rucker IV, Matt Schearer kick (Drive: 4 plays, 65 yards, 1:23; Bucknell 7–0)
- (10:44) NAVY – Daba Fofana 49 yard run, kick failed (Drive: 1 play, 49 yards, 0:09; Bucknell 7–6)

Second quarter

- (14:56) NAVY – Alex Tecza 3 yard run, Nathan Kirkwood kick (Drive: 5 plays, 23 yards, 1:36; Navy 13–7)
- (5:29) NAVY – Eli Heidenreich 9 yard pass from Blake Horvath, Nathan Kirkwood kick (Drive: 9 plays, 59 yards, 3:29; Navy 20–7)
- (0:14) NAVY – Brandon Chatman 42 yard pass from Blake Horvath, 2-point pass (Drive: 1 play, 42 yards, 0:14; Navy 28–7)

Third quarter

- (11:12) NAVY – Eli Heidenreich 20 yard pass from Braxton Woodson, Nathan Kirkwood kick (Drive: 9 plays, 49 yards, 3:41; Navy 35–7)
- (3:06) BUCK – Paul Neel 3 yard run, Matt Schearer kick (Drive: 9 plays, 40 yards, 2:44; Navy 35–14)

Fourth quarter

- (8:33) NAVY – Braxton Woodson 1 yard run, Nathan Kirkwood kick (Drive: 7 plays, 58 yards, 3:07; Navy 42–14)
- (2:10) NAVY – Shane Reynolds 5 yard run, Nathan Kirkwood kick (Drive: 7 plays, 31 yards, 4:34; Navy 49–14)
- (0:30) BUCK – Michael Cadden 2 yard run, Matt Schearer kick (Drive: 7 plays, 75 yards, 1:40; Navy 49–21)

Statistics	BUCK	NAVY
First downs	14	20
Plays–yards	68–337	72–437
Rushes–yards	39–131	53–264
Passing yards	206	173
Passing: Comp–Att–Int	15–29–0	10–19–2
Time of possession	26:59	33:01

Team	Category	Player	Statistics
Bucknell	Passing	Ralph Rucker IV	11/24, 122 yards, 1 TD
Bucknell	Rushing	Paul Neel	12 carries, 60 yards, 1 TD
Bucknell	Receiving	TJ Cadden	5 receptions, 97 yards
Navy	Passing	Blake Horvath	7/12, 108 yards, 2 TD, 1 INT
Navy	Rushing	Daba Fofana	8 carries, 82 yards, 1 TD
Navy	Receiving	Eli Heidenreich	4 receptions, 74 yards, 2 TD

=== Temple ===
Temple Owls (0–1) at Navy Midshipmen (1–0) – Game summary

Quarter	1	2	3	4	Total
Owls	0	3	0	8	11
Midshipmen	9	14	15	0	38

at Navy–Marine Corps Memorial Stadium • Annapolis, Maryland

- Date: September 7th
- Game time: 3:30 p.m. EDT
- Game weather: Cloudy • Temperature: 71 °F (22 °C) • Wind: NW at 14 miles per hour (23 km/h)
- Game attendance: 28,889
- Referee: Steven Anderson
- TV announcers (CBSSN): Carter Blackburn (play-by-play), Randy Cross (analyst), and Sheehan Stanwick-Burch (sideline reporter)

Game information

First quarter

- (5:44) NAVY – Team safety (Navy 2–0)
- (0:23) NAVY – Blake Horvath 2 yard run, Nathan Kirkwood kick (Drive: 11 plays, 58 yards, 5:15; Navy 9–0)

Second quarter

- (13:11) NAVY – Blake Horvath 62 yard run, Nathan Kirkwood kick (Drive: 1 play, 62 yards, 0:10; Navy 16–0)
- (8:04) NAVY – Alex Tecza 65 yard run, Nathan Kirkwood kick (Drive: 1 play, 65 yards, 0:08; Navy 23–0)
- (0:00) TEM – Maddux Trujillo 36 yard field goal (Drive: 7 plays, 37 yards, 1:28; Navy 23–3)

Third quarter

- (11:01) NAVY – Eli Heidenreich 31 yard pass from Blake Horvath, 2-point pass (Drive: 9 plays, 81 yards, 3:54; Navy 31–3)
- (2:58) NAVY – Blake Horvath 18 yard run, Nathan Kirkwood kick (Drive: 4 plays, 28 yards, 1:50; Navy 38–3)

Fourth quarter

- (10:00) TEM – Dante Wright 23 yard pass from Forrest Brock, 2-point pass (Drive: 11 plays, 82 yards, 4:53; Navy 38–11)

Statistics	TEM	NAVY
First downs	16	17
Plays–yards	66–312	60–409
Rushes–yards	20–35	51–297
Passing yards	277	112
Passing: Comp–Att–Int	30–46–2	5–9–0
Time of possession	29:10	30:50

Team	Category	Player	Statistics
Temple	Passing	Forrest Brock	30/46, 277 yards, 1 TD, 2 INT
Temple	Rushing	Antwain Littleton II	9 carries, 22 yards
Temple	Receiving	Dante Wright	11 receptions, 101 yards, 1 TD
Navy	Passing	Blake Horvath	5/9, 112 yards, 1 TD
Navy	Rushing	Blake Horvath	15 carries, 122 yards, 3 TD
Navy	Receiving	Eli Heidenreich	4 receptions, 98 yards, 1 TD

=== Memphis ===
Memphis Tigers (3–0) at Navy Midshipmen (2–0) – Game summary

Quarter	1	2	3	4	Total
Tigers	14	3	13	14	44
Midshipmen	7	21	7	21	56

at Navy–Marine Corps Memorial Stadium • Annapolis, Maryland

- Date: September 21st
- Game time: 3:30 p.m. EDT
- Game weather: Sunny • Temperature: 78 °F (26 °C) • Wind: SE at 9 miles per hour (14 km/h)
- Game attendance: 31,268
- Referee: Kevin Randall
- TV announcers (CBSSN): Carter Blackburn (play-by-play), Randy Cross (analyst), and Sheehan Stanwick-Burch (sideline reporter)

Game information

First quarter

- (11:13) MEM – Mario Anderson Jr. 7-yard run, Caden Costa kick (Drive: 9 plays, 65 yards, 3:47; Memphis 7–0)
- (3:11) NAVY – Blake Horvath 5-yard run, Nathan Kirkwood kick (Drive: 10 plays, 77 yards, 5:01; Tied 7–7)
- (1:21) MEM – Brandon Thomas 57-yard run, Caden Costa kick (Drive: 4 plays, 75 yards, 1:50; Memphis 14–7)

Second quarter

- (14:54) NAVY – Eli Heidenreich 39-yard pass from Blake Horvath, Nathan Kirkwood kick (Drive: 4 plays, 75 yards, 1:27; Tied 14–14)
- (9:37) NAVY – Brandon Chatman 12-yard run, Nathan Kirkwood kick (Drive: 7 plays, 52 yards, 3:37; Navy 21–14)
- (2:14) MEM – Caden Costa 29-yard field goal (Drive: 15 plays, 64 yards, 7:23; Navy 21–17)
- (0:11) NAVY – Blake Horvath 3-yard run, Nathan Kirkwood kick (Drive: 9 plays, 75 yards, 2:03; Navy 28–17)

Third quarter

- (12:24) NAVY – Brandon Chatman 46-yard pass from Blake Horvath, Nathan Kirkwood kick (Drive: 5 plays, 75 yards, 2:36; Navy 35–17)
- (10:37) MEM – Roc Taylor 37-yard pass from Seth Henigan, Caden Costa kick (Drive: 5 plays, 72 yards, 1:47; Navy 35–24)
- (1:11) MEM – Mario Anderson Jr. 5-yard run (Drive: 12 plays, 95 yards, 5:28; Navy 35–30)

Fourth quarter

- (14:56) NAVY – Blake Horvath 7-yard run, Nathan Kirkwood kick (Drive: 4 plays, 75 yards, 1:15; Navy 42–30)
- (8:22) NAVY – Blake Horvath 90-yard run, Nathan Kirkwood kick (Drive: 1 play, 90 yards, 0:14; Navy 49–30)
- (6:49) MEM – Marcello Bussey 36-yard pass from Seth Henigan, Koby Drake pass (Drive: 6 plays, 80 yards, 1:25; Navy 49–38)
- (1:22) MEM – Mario Anderson Jr. 1-yard run (Drive: 13 plays, 80 yards, 3:03; Navy 49–44)
- (0:23) NAVY – Rayuan Lane 86-yard interception, Nathan Kirkwood kick (Navy 56–44)

Statistics	MEM	NAVY
First downs	32	21
Plays–yards	95–659	53–566
Rushes–yards	38–274	39–361
Passing yards	385	205
Passing: Comp–Att–Int	33–57–1	10–14–0
Time of possession	35:55	24:05

Team	Category	Player	Statistics
Memphis	Passing	Seth Henigan	32/56, 371 yards, 2 TD, INT
Memphis	Rushing	Brandon Thomas	12 carries, 125 yards, TD
Memphis	Receiving	Kobe Drake	9 receptions, 102 yards
Navy	Passing	Blake Horvath	9/12, 192 yards, 2 TD
Navy	Rushing	Blake Horvath	12 carries, 211 yards, 4 TD
Navy	Receiving	Brandon Chatman	3 receptions, 81 yards, TD

Blake Horvath had a career game day when he completed 9 of 11 passes for 225 yards with two touchdowns. He also had 4 rushing touchdowns totalling 211 yards. Horvath became the first quarterback with six-plus total touchdowns in a game since Malcolm Perry (6 TD against ECU in 2019).

=== at UAB ===
Navy Midshipmen (3–0) at UAB Blazers (1–2) – Game summary

Quarter	1	2	3	4	Total
Midshipmen	7	14	10	10	41
Blazers	0	3	7	8	18

at Protective Stadium • Birmingham, Alabama

- Date: September 28th
- Game time: 12:00 p.m. EDT
- Game weather: Rain • Temperature: 70 °F (21 °C) • Wind: SW at 10 miles per hour (16 km/h)
- Game attendance: 21,536
- Referee: Charles Lamertina
- TV announcers (ESPN2): Roy Philpott (play-by-play), Sam Acho (analyst) and Taylor Davis (sideline reporter)

Game information

First quarter

- (7:52) NAVY – Blake Horvath 20-yard run, Nathan Kirkwood kick (Drive: 7 plays, 61 yards, 3:33; Navy 7–0)

Second quarter

- (9:01) NAVY – Alex Tecza 6-yard run, Nathan Kirkwood kick (Drive: 14 plays, 84 yards, 7:56; Navy 14–0)
- (1:11) UAB – Jonah Delange 35-yard field goal (Drive: 15 plays, 57 yards, 7:45; Navy 14–3)
- (0:31) NAVY – Nathan Kent 77-yard pass from Blake Horvath, Nathan Kirkwood kick (Drive: 2 plays, 75 yards, 0:40; Navy 21–3)

Third quarter

- (13:36) NAVY – Eli Heidenreich 74-yard pass from Blake Horvath, Nathan Kirkwood kick (Drive: 3 plays, 75 yards, 1:24; Navy 28–3)
- (6:49) NAVY – Nathan Kirkwood 45-yard field goal (Drive: 6 plays, 49 yards, 2:47; Navy 31–3)
- (5:08) UAB – Iverson Hooks 39-yard pass from Jacob Zeno, Jonah Delange kick (Drive: 4 plays, 80 yards, 1:36; Navy 31–10)

Fourth quarter

- (10:32) NAVY – Daba Fofana 16-yard run, Nathan Kirkwood kick (Drive: 8 plays, 94 yards, 4:28; Navy 38–10)
- (9:09) UAB – Lee Beebe Jr., 2-yard run, Kam Shanks pass (Drive: 3 plays, 75 yards, 1:17; Navy 38–18)
- (2:14) NAVY – Nathan Kirkwood 46-yard field goal (Drive: 12 plays, 46 yards, 6:55; Navy 41–18)

Statistics	NAVY	UAB
First downs	22	22
Plays–yards	53–452	66–395
Rushes–yards	42–227	43–193
Passing yards	225	202
Passing: Comp–Att–Int	9–11–0	14–23–2
Time of possession	29:49	30:11

Team	Category	Player	Statistics
Navy	Passing	Blake Horvath	9/11, 225 yards, 2 TD
Navy	Rushing	Blake Horvath	13 carries, 84 yards, TD
Navy	Receiving	Eli Heidenreich	3 receptions, 108 yards, TD
UAB	Passing	Jacob Zeno	14/22, 202 yards, TD, 2 INT
UAB	Rushing	Lee Beebe Jr.	15 carries, 82 yards, TD
UAB	Receiving	Terrell McDonald	1 reception, 67 yards

=== at Air Force ===
Navy Midshipmen (4–0) at Air Force Falcons (1–3) – Game summary

Quarter	1	2	3	4	Total
Midshipmen	14	7	6	7	34
Falcons	0	7	0	0	7

at Falcon Stadium • Colorado Springs, Colorado

- Date: October 5th
- Game time: 12:00 p.m. EDT
- Game weather: Temperature: 72 °F (22 °C) • Wind: N/A • Weather: Sunny
- Game attendance: 39,441
- Referee: Tim Rich
- TV announcers (CBS): Rich Waltz (play-by-play), Ross Tucker (analyst), and Tiffany Blackmon (sideline reporter)

Game information

First quarter

- (6:25) NAVY – Blake Horvath 1-yard run, Nathan Kirkwood kick (Drive: 10 plays, 87 yards, 4:39; Navy 7–0)
- (2:34) NAVY – Nathan Kent 34-yard run, Nathan Kirkwood kick (Drive: 4 plays, 41 yards, 1:42; Navy 14–0)

Second quarter

- (11:09) AF – Tre Roberson 45-yard pass from Quentin Hayes (Drive: 5 plays, 81 yards, 2:21; Navy 14–7)
- (2:37) NAVY – Blake Horvath 2-yard run, Nathan Kirkwood kick (Drive: 8 plays, 79 yards, 4:17; Navy 21–7)

Third quarter

- (6:08) Navy – Alex Tecza 7-yard run, Nathan Kirkwood kick (Drive: 5 plays, 75 yards, 3:09; Navy 27–7)

Fourth quarter

- (6:58) Navy – Alex Tecza 12-yard run, Nathan Kirkwood kick (Drive: 5 plays, 75 yards, 3:09; Navy 34–7)

Statistics	NAVY	AFA
First downs	21	14
Plays–yards	63–463	57–273
Rushes–yards	48–329	48–158
Passing yards	134	115
Passing: Comp–Att–Int	9–15–0	5–9–1
Time of possession	30:34	29:26

Team	Category	Player	Statistics
Navy	Passing	Blake Horvath	9/15, 134 yards
Navy	Rushing	Blake Horvath	18 carries, 115 yards, 2 TD
Navy	Receiving	Eli Heidenreich	5 receptions, 101 yards
Air Force	Passing	Quentin Hayes	5/6, 115 yards, TD
Air Force	Rushing	Kade Frew	4 carries, 29 yards
Air Force	Receiving	Tre Roberson	1 reception, 45 yards, TD

Eli Heidenreich is the first player in academy history to rush for 100 yards and have 100 yards receiving in the same game. He ran for exactly 100 yards and caught five passes for 101 yards. This made it the first time since the 2003 season that Navy had two 200-yard rushers and a 100-yard receiver.

=== Charlotte ===
Charlotte 49ers (3–3) at No. 25 Navy Midshipmen (5–0) – Game summary

Quarter	1	2	3	4	Total
49ers	0	10	7	0	17
No. 25 Midshipmen	24	14	13	0	51

at Navy–Marine Corps Memorial Stadium • Annapolis, Maryland

- Date: October 19th
- Game time: 3:30 p.m. EDT
- Game weather: Sunny • Temperature: 66 °F (19 °C) • Wind: SW 4 miles per hour (6.4 km/h)
- Game attendance: 35,094
- Referee: Edwin Lee
- TV announcers (CBSSN): Carter Blackburn (play-by-play), Adam Breneman (analyst), and Sheehan Stanwick-Burch (sideline reporter)

Game information

First quarter

- (13:07) NAVY – Alex Tecza 46-yard pass from Blake Horvath, Nathan Kirkwood kick (Drive: 4 plays, 73 yards, 1:44; Navy 7–0)
- (7:17) NAVY – Alex Tecza 12-yard run, Nathan Kirkwood kick (Drive: 5 plays, 50 yards, 2:46; Navy 14–0)
- (6:20) NAVY – Alex Tecza 2-yard run, Nathan Kirkwood kick (Drive: 3 plays, 17 yards, 0:48; Navy 21–0)
- (3:02) NAVY – Nathan Kirkwood 22-yard field goal (Drive: 7 plays, 41 yards, 3:01; Navy 24–0)

Second quarter

- (13:21) NAVY – Cody Howard 11-yard pass from Blake Horvath, Nathan Kirkwood kick (Drive: 6 plays, 38 yards, 3:16; Navy 31–0)
- (10:24) NAVY – Deshaun Peele 61-yard interception return, Nathan Kirkwood kick (Drive: 2 plays, 26 yards, 2:49; Navy 38–0)
- (8:49) CHAR – Stephen Rusnak 39-yard field goal (Drive: 4 plays, -6 yards, 3:57; Navy 38–3)
- (3:09) CHAR – O'Mega Blake 20-yard pass from Max Brown, Stephen Rusnak kick (Drive: 8 plays, 84 yards, 3:57; Navy 38–10)

Third quarter

- (4:49) NAVY – Brandon Chatman 19-yard pass from Blake Horvath, Nathan Kirkwood PAT failed (Drive: 4 plays, 40 yards, 2:03; Navy 44–10)
- (2:55) CHAR – Duane Thomas Jr. 13-yard pass from Max Brown, Stephen Rusnak kick (Drive: 4 plays, 82 yards, 1:47; Navy 44–17)
- (1:31) NAVY – Deshaun Peele 84-yard interception return, Nathan Kirkwood kick (Drive: 1 play, 0 yards, 0:20; Navy 51–17)

Fourth quarter

No scoring plays

Statistics	CLT	NAVY
First downs	22	18
Plays–yards	70–350	55–288
Rushes–yards	48–187	42–171
Passing yards	163	117
Passing: Comp–Att–Int	8–22–4	7–13–0
Time of possession	32:15	27:45

Team	Category	Player	Statistics
Charlotte	Passing	Max Brown	7/18, 152 yards, 2 TD, 3 INT
Charlotte	Rushing	Catervious Norton	16 carries, 59 yards
Charlotte	Receiving	Miles Burris	1 reception, 48 yards
Navy	Passing	Blake Horvath	7/13, 117 yards, 3 TD
Navy	Rushing	Alex Tecza	8 carries, 68 yards, 2 TD
Navy	Receiving	Alex Tecza	1 reception, 46 yards, TD

=== No. 12 Notre Dame (rivalry) ===
No. 12 Notre Dame Fighting Irish (6–1) vs No. 24 Navy Midshipmen (6–0) – Game summary

Quarter	1	2	3	4	Total
No. 12 Fighting Irish	14	17	13	7	51
No. 24 Midshipmen	0	7	7	0	14

at MetLife Stadium • East Rutherford, New Jersey

- Date: October 26th
- Game time: 12:00 p.m. EDT
- Game weather: Temperature: 63 °F (17 °C) • Wind: SE at 8 miles per hour (13 km/h) • Weather: Sunny
- Game attendance: 76,112
- Referee: Marcus Woods
- TV announcers (ABC): Sean McDonough (play-by-play), Greg McElroy (analyst), and Molly McGrath (sideline reporter)

Game information

First quarter

- (10:28) ND – Riley Leonard 1-yard run, Zac Yoakam kick (Drive: 9 plays, 75 yards, 4:32; Notre Dame 7–0)
- (5:44) ND – Kris Mitchell 6-yard pass from Riley Leonard, Zac Yoakam kick (Drive: 3 plays, 7 yards, 1:19; Notre Dame 14–0)

Second quarter

- (13:33) NAVY – Blake Horvath 47-yard run, Nathan Kirkwood kick (Drive: 5 plays, 80 yards, 2:18; Notre Dame 14–7)
- (12:28) ND – Jeremiyah Love 64-yard run, Zac Yoakam kick (Drive: 3 plays, 75 yards, 1:08; Notre Dame 21–7)
- (5:05) ND – Jeremiyah Love 2-yard run, Zac Yoakam kick (Drive: 9 plays, 40 yards, 4:57; Notre Dame 28–7)
- (0:26) ND – Zac Yoakam 32-yard field goal (Drive: 9 plays, 63 yards, 1:20; Notre Dame 21–7)

Third quarter

- (8:44) NAVY – Eli Heidenreich 1-yard run, Nathan Kirkwood kick (Drive: 12 plays, 75 yards, 6:16; Notre Dame 31–14)
- (5:35) ND – Beaux Collins 1-yard run, Zac Yoakam kick (Drive: 12 plays, 75 yards, 6:16; Notre Dame 38–14)
- (4:18) ND – Jaylen Sneed 0-yard fumble return (Drive: 3 plays, -3 yards, 1:17; Notre Dame 44–14)

Fourth quarter

- (7:08) ND – Kadren Young 4-yard run, Zac Yoakam kick (Drive: 4 plays, 16 yards, 2:12; Notre Dame 51–14)

Statistics	ND	NAVY
First downs	20	17
Plays–yards	65–466	57–310
Rushes–yards	40–265	43–222
Passing yards	201	88
Passing: Comp–Att–Int	15–25–0	7–14–1
Time of possession	30:29	29:31

Team	Category	Player	Statistics
Notre Dame	Passing	Riley Leonard	13/21, 178 yards, 2 TD
Notre Dame	Rushing	Jeremiyah Love	12 carries, 102 yards, 2 TD
Notre Dame	Receiving	Jordan Faison	4 receptions, 52 yards
Navy	Passing	Blake Horvath	7/13, 88 yards, INT
Navy	Rushing	Blake Horvath	13 carries, 129 yards, TD
Navy	Receiving	Alex Tecza	2 receptions, 39 yards

=== at Rice ===
Navy Midshipmen (6–1) at Rice Owls (2–6) – Game summary

Quarter	1	2	3	4	Total
Midshipmen	0	7	0	3	10
Owls	14	3	7	0	24

at Rice Stadium • Houston, Texas

- Date: November 2nd
- Game time: 4:00 p.m. EDT
- Game weather: Rain • Temperature: 76 °F (24 °C) • Wind: SW 10 miles per hour (16 km/h)
- Game attendance: 21,253
- Referee: Reid Jackson
- TV announcers (ESPN2): Mike Monaco (play-by-play), Kirk Morrison (analyst) and Dawn Davenport (sideline)

Game information

First quarter

- (9:30) RICE – Dean Connors 4-yard run, Tim Horn kick (Drive: 5 plays, 45 yards, 2:05; Rice 7–0)
- (2:41) RICE – Matt Sykes 17-yard pass from E. J. Warner, Tim Horn kick (Drive: 7 plays, 62 yards, 3:53; Rice 14–0)

Second quarter

- (12:41) RICE – Tim Horn 47-yard field goal (Drive: 10 plays, 45 yards, 4:01; Rice 17–0)
- (8:48) NAVY – Blake Horvath 9-yard run, Nathan Kirkwood kick (Drive: 8 plays, 75 yards, 3:53; Rice 17–7)

Third quarter

- (2:00) RICE – Dean Connors 9-yard run, Tim Horn kick (Drive: 11 plays, 80 yards, 5:38; Rice 24–7)

Fourth quarter

- (8:34) NAVY – Nathan Kirkwood 21-yard field goal (Drive: 18 plays, 71 yards, 8:26; Rice 24–10)

Statistics	NAVY	RICE
First downs	12	20
Plays–yards	61–260	65–344
Rushes–yards	40–140	25–105
Passing yards	120	239
Passing: Comp–Att–Int	10–21–2	28–40–1
Time of possession	28:46	31:14

Team	Category	Player	Statistics
Navy	Passing	Blake Horvath	10/21, 120 yards, 2 INT
Navy	Rushing	Blake Horvath	16 carries, 64 yards, TD
Navy	Receiving	Eli Heidenreich	3 receptions, 56 yards
Rice	Passing	E. J. Warner	28/40, 239 yards, TD, INT
Rice	Rushing	Dean Connors	18 carries, 105 yards, 2 TD
Rice	Receiving	Matt Sykes	8 receptions, 93 yards, TD

=== at South Florida ===
Navy Midshipmen (6–2) at South Florida Bulls (4–4) – Game summary

Quarter	1	2	3	4	Total
Midshipmen	14	7	0	7	28
Bulls	0	0	0	7	7

at Raymond James Stadium • Tampa, Florida

- Date: November 9th
- Game time: 12:00 p.m. EST
- Game weather: Sunny • Temperature: 84 °F (29 °C) • Wind: W 10 miles per hour (16 km/h)
- Game attendance: 34,091
- Referee: Kevin Randall
- TV announcers (ESPN2): Roy Philpott (play-by-play), Sam Acho (analyst) and Taylor Davis (sideline)

Game information

First quarter

- (12:37) NAVY – Eli Heidenreich 60-yard run, Nathan Kirkwood kick (Drive: 4 plays, 70 yards, 2:23; Navy 7–0)
- (3:26) NAVY – Brandon Chatman 20-yard run, Nathan Kirkwood kick (Drive: 13 plays, 79 yards, 6:52; Navy 14–0)

Second quarter

- (0:02) NAVY – Alex Tecza 38-yard pass from Blake Horvath, Nathan Kirkwood kick (Drive: 2 plays, 53 yards, 0:12; Navy 21–0)

Third quarter

No scoring plays

Fourth quarter

- (11:45) NAVY – Blake Horvath 10-yard run, Nathan Kirkwood kick (Drive: 13 plays, 87 yards, 7:08; Navy 28–0)
- (1:06) USF – Michael Brown-Stephens 13-yard pass from Bryce Archie, John Cannon kick (Drive: 10 plays, 75 yards, 2:53; Navy 28–7)

Statistics	NAVY	USF
First downs	18	17
Plays–yards	70–379	69–342
Rushes–yards	59–321	25–60
Passing yards	58	282
Passing: Comp–Att–Int	6–11–0	26–44–2
Time of possession	38:32	21:28

Team	Category	Player	Statistics
Navy	Passing	Blake Horvath	6/11, 58 yards, TD
Navy	Rushing	Eli Heidenreich	6 carries, 84 yards, TD
Navy	Receiving	Alex Tecza	1 reception, 38 yards, TD
South Florida	Passing	Bryce Archie	26/43, 282 yards, TD, 2 INT
South Florida	Rushing	Kelley Joiner	9 carries, 23 yards
South Florida	Receiving	JeyQuan Smith	2 receptions, 85 yards

=== No. 25 Tulane ===
No. 25 Tulane Green Wave (8–2) at Navy Midshipmen (7–2) – Game summary

Quarter	1	2	3	4	Total
No. 25 Green Wave	7	7	7	14	35
Midshipmen	0	0	0	0	0

at Navy–Marine Corps Memorial Stadium • Annapolis, Maryland

- Date: November 16th
- Game time: 12:00 p.m. EST
- Game weather: Temperature: 58 °F (14 °C) • Wind: SE at 13 miles per hour (21 km/h) • Weather: Sunny
- Game attendance: 38,914
- Referee: Tim Rich
- TV announcers (ESPN2): Roy Philpott (play-by-play), Sam Acho (analyst), and Taylor Davis (sideline)

Game information

First quarter

- (1:07) TUL – Darian Mensah 14-yard run, Patrick Durkin kick (Drive: 5 plays, 63 yards, 1:58; Tulane 7–0)

Second quarter

- (4:00) TUL – Makhi Hughes 14-yard run, Patrick Durkin kick (Drive: 11 plays, 65 yards, 6:12; Tulane 14–0)

Third quarter

- (6:15) TUL – Makhi Hughes 1-yard run, Patrick Durkin kick (Drive: 13 plays, 65 yards, 8:45; Tulane 21–0)

Fourth quarter

- (9:19) TUL – Alex Bauman 1-yard pass from Darian Mensah, Patrick Durkin kick (Drive: 9 plays, 79 yards, 5:22; Tulane 28–0)
- (7:38) TUL – Arnold Barnes III 1-yard pass from Darian Mensah, Patrick Durkin kick (Drive: 3 plays, 20 yards, 1:35; Tulane 35–0)

Statistics	TULN	NAVY
First downs	20	8
Plays–yards	62–358	46–113
Rushes–yards	48–220	35–100
Passing yards	138	13
Passing: Comp–Att–Int	10–14–0	3–11–1
Time of possession	35:47	24:13

Team	Category	Player	Statistics
Tulane	Passing	Darian Mensah	10/14, 138 yards, 2 TD
Tulane	Rushing	Makhi Hughes	22 carries, 82 yards, 2 TD
Tulane	Receiving	Dontae Fleming	2 receptions, 56 yards
Navy	Passing	Braxton Woodson	3/10, 13 yards, INT
Navy	Rushing	Alex Tecza	7 carries, 31 yards
Navy	Receiving	Luke Hutchinson	2 receptions, 8 yards

=== at East Carolina ===
Navy Midshipmen (7–3) at East Carolina Pirates (7–4) – Game summary

Quarter	1	2	3	4	Total
Midshipmen	0	0	14	20	34
Pirates	0	3	0	17	20

at Dowdy–Ficklen Stadium • Greenville, North Carolina

- Date: November 29th
- Game time: 12:00 p.m. EST
- Game weather: Temperature: 48 °F (9 °C) • Wind: NW at 5 miles per hour (8.0 km/h) • Weather: Sunny
- Game attendance: 35,663
- Referee: Edwin Lee
- TV announcers (ESPN): Anish Shroff (play-by-play), Andre Ware (analyst) and Paul Carcaterra (sideline)

Game information

First quarter

- No scoring plays this quarter.

Second quarter

- (9:47) ECU – Andrew Conrad 35-yard field goal (Drive: 4 plays, -1 yards, 1:06; East Carolina 3–0)

Third quarter

- (6:58) NAVY – Brandon Chatman 16-yard run, Nathan Kirkwood kick (Drive: 14 plays, 76 yards, 7:57; Navy 7–3)
- (0:11) NAVY – Eli Heidenreich 36-yard run, Nathan Kirkwood kick (Drive: 5 plays, 57 yards, 2:08; Navy 14–3)

Fourth quarter

- (11:49) ECU – Andrew Conrad 48-yard field goal (Drive: 10 plays, 43 yards, 3:08; Navy 14–6)
- (10:48) NAVY – Nathan Kent 61-yard pass from Baxton Woodson, Nathan Kirkwood kick (Drive: 3 plays, 75 yards, 1:11; Navy 21–6)
- (5:35) ECU – Winston Wright Jr. 9-yard pass from Katin Houser, Andrew Conrad kick (Drive: 16 plays, 78 yards, 5:08; Navy 21–13)
- (2:49) NAVY – Baxton Woodson 38-yard run, Nathan Kirkwood PAT blocked (Drive: 5 plays, 75 yards, 2:46; Navy 27–13)
- (2:06) NAVY – Baxton Woodson 10-yard run, Nathan Kirkwood kick (Drive: 2 plays, 15 yards, 0:09; Navy 33–13)
- (0:11) ECU – Yannick Smith 52-yard pass from Katin Houser, Andrew Conrad kick (Drive: 4 plays, 85 yards, 0:28; Navy 40–20)

Statistics	NAVY	ECU
First downs	21	19
Plays–yards	72–458	70–350
Rushes–yards	53–293	34–131
Passing yards	165	219
Passing: Comp–Att–Int	19–19–0	20–36–1
Time of possession	34:30	25:30

Team	Category	Player	Statistics
Navy	Passing	Baxton Woodson	12/19, 165 yards, TD
Navy	Rushing	Braxton Woodson	15 carries, 125 yards, 2 TD
Navy	Receiving	Nathan Kent	2 receptions, 68 yards, TD
East Carolina	Passing	Katin Houser	20/36, 219 yards, TD, INT
East Carolina	Rushing	Rahjai Harris	19 carries, 88 yards
East Carolina	Receiving	Yannick Smith	3 receptions, 66 yards, TD

=== vs. No. 22 Army (Army–Navy Game) ===
Navy Midshipmen (8–3) vs No. 22 Army Black Knights (11–1) – Game summary

Quarter	1	2	3	4	Total
Midshipmen	7	7	7	10	31
No. 22 Black Knights	0	7	3	3	13

at Northwest Stadium • Landover, Maryland

- Date: December 14th
- Game time: 3:00 p.m. EST
- Game weather: Temperature: 38 °F (3 °C) • Wind: E at 6 miles per hour (9.7 km/h) • Weather: Sunny
- Game attendance: 60,726
- Referee: Kevin Randall
- TV announcers (CBS): Brad Nessler (play-by-play), Gary Danielson (analyst), and Jenny Dell (sideline reporter)

Game information

First quarter

- (8:56) NAVY – Blake Horvath 1-yard run, Nathan Kirkwood kick (Drive: 12 plays, 65 yards, 6:04; Navy 7–0)

Second quarter

- (11:30) NAVY – Brandon Chatman 18-yard pass from Blake Horvath, Nathan Kirkwood kick (Drive: 3 plays, 44 yards, 1:15; Navy 14–0)
- (6:29) ARMY – Hayden Reed 23-yard pass from Bryson Daily, Trey Gronotte kick (Drive: 8 plays, 65 yards, 5:01; Navy 14–7)

Third quarter

- (8:15) ARMY – Trey Gronotte 39-yard field goal (Drive: 11 plays, 47 yards, 6:40; Navy 14–10)
- (6:34) NAVY – Eli Heidenreich 52-yard pass from Blake Horvath, Nathan Kirkwood kick (Drive: 3 plays, 58 yards, 1:33; Navy 21–10)

Fourth quarter

- (14:44) ARMY – Trey Gronotte 31-yard field goal (Drive: 13 plays, 45 yards, 6:43; Navy 21–13)
- (8:50) NAVY – Blake Horvath 1-yard run, Nathan Kirkwood kick (Drive: 10 plays, 75 yards, 5:49; Navy 28–13)
- (3:45) NAVY – Nathan Kirkwood 27-yard field goal (Drive: 6 plays, 57 yards, 3:39; Navy 31–13)

Statistics	NAVY	ARMY
First downs	15	13
Plays–yards	55–378	55–178
Rushes–yards	46–271	39–113
Passing yards	107	65
Passing: Comp–Att–Int	4–9–0	7–16–3
Time of possession	29:30	30:20

Team	Category	Player	Statistics
Navy	Passing	Blake Horvath	4/9, 107 yards, 2 TD
Navy	Rushing	Blake Horvath	24 carries, 196 yards, 2 TD
Navy	Receiving	Eli Heidenreich	1 reception, 52 yards, TD
Army	Passing	Bryson Daily	7/16, 65 yards, TD
Army	Rushing	Kanye Udoh	14 carries, 53 yards
Army	Receiving	Hayden Reed	3 receptions, 29 yards, TD

For this year's 125th Army–Navy Game, the Navy Midshipmen chose to honor the Jolly Rogers which were established in 1943 during World War II as the most lethal Naval Aviation team in U.S. Navy history. They were most feared by their enemies that their tagline is "Fear the Bones" and their callsign is "Victory". The Midshipmen wore navy dark blue uniforms with sleeves featuring an angled stripe, with 9 chevrons that pays tribute to the nine aircraft (like the VF-61 and VF-84) flown throughout the squadron's history. The helmet design has chevrons as well with the skull and bones logo on the sides on a white background.

=== Oklahoma (2024 Armed Forces Bowl) ===
2024 Armed Forces Bowl
Oklahoma Sooners (6-6) vs. Navy Midshipmen (9–3)

Quarter	1	2	3	4	Total
Sooners	14	0	0	6	20
Midshipmen	0	7	7	7	21

at Amon G. Carter Stadium • Fort Worth, Texas

- Date: Friday, December 27, 2024
- Game time: 12:00 p.m. EST
- Game weather: Sunny • Temperature: 58 °F (14 °C) • Wind: 13 mph (21 km/h) south
- Game attendance: 50,754
- Referee: Mike McCabe
- TV announcers (ESPN): Courtney Lyle (play-by-play), Rene Ingoglia (analyst) & Morgan Uber (sideline)

Game information

First quarter

- (11:30) OU – Gavin Sawchuk 21-yard run, Zach Schmit kick (Drive: 9 plays, 75 yards, 4:32; Oklahoma 7–0)
- (5:56) OU – Zion Kearney 56-yard pass from Michael Hawkins, Jr., Zach Schmit kick (Drive: 6 plays, 85 yards, 1:43; Oklahoma 14–0)

Second quarter

- (3:40) NAVY – Alex Tecza 11-yard run, Nathan Kirkwood kick (Drive: 6 plays, 45 yards, 3:36; Oklahoma 14–7)

Third quarter

- (3:49) NAVY – Blake Horvath 95-yard run, Nathan Kirkwood kick (Drive: 2 plays, 96 yards, 1:12; Tied 14–14)

Fourth quarter

- (4:34) NAVY – Blake Horvath 6-yard run, Nathan Kirkwood kick (Drive: 12 plays, 66 yards, 7:32; Navy 21–14)
- (0:06) OU – Jake Roberts 10-yard pass from Michael Hawkins Jr., Two-point conversion failed (Drive: 13 plays, 65 yards, 1:41; Navy 21–20)

Statistics	OU	NAVY
First downs	27	11
Total yards	433	318
Rushes/yards	40–158	40–226
Passing yards	275	92
Passing: Comp–Att–Int	29–44–0	7–13–0
Time of possession	29:50	30:10

Team	Category	Player	Statistics
Oklahoma	Passing	Michael Hawkins Jr.	28/43, 247 yards, 2 TD
Oklahoma	Rushing	Gavin Sawchuk	13 carries, 67 yards, TD
Oklahoma	Receiving	Ivan Carreon	7 receptions, 22 yards
Navy	Passing	Blake Horvath	7/12, 92 yards
Navy	Rushing	Blake Horvath	18 carries, 155 yards, 2 TD
Navy	Receiving	Nathan Kent	1 reception, 32 yards
