= 2024 Florida Atlantic Owls football team =

American college football season

2024 Florida Atlantic Owls football
- Conference: American Athletic Conference
- Record: 3–9 (1–7 AAC)
- Head coach: Tom Herman (2nd season; first 10 games); Chad Lunsford (interim; final 2 games)
- Offensive coordinator: Charlie Frye (2nd season)
- Offensive scheme: Up-tempo
- Defensive coordinator: Roc Bellantoni (2nd season)
- Co-defensive coordinator: Brandon Harris (2nd season)
- Base defense: Multiple
- Home stadium: FAU Stadium

2024 American Athletic Conference football standings
	Conf.			Overall
Team	W		L	W		L
No. 21 Army y$	8	–	0	12	–	2
Tulane y	7	–	1	9	–	5
Navy	6	–	2	10	–	3
No. 24 Memphis	6	–	2	11	–	2
East Carolina	5	–	3	8	–	5
South Florida	4	–	4	7	–	6
UTSA	4	–	4	7	–	6
Charlotte	4	–	4	5	–	7
North Texas	3	–	5	6	–	7
Rice	3	–	5	4	–	8
Temple	2	–	6	3	–	9
UAB	2	–	6	3	–	9
Florida Atlantic	1	–	7	3	–	9
Tulsa	1	–	7	3	–	9
Championship: Army 35, Tulane 14
$ – Conference champion; y – Championship game participant; Rankings from AP Poll

The 2024 Florida Atlantic Owls football team represented Florida Atlantic University in the American Athletic Conference (AAC) during the 2024 NCAA Division I FBS football season. The Owls were led by Tom Herman in his second year as the head coach. The Owls played their home games at FAU Stadium, located in Boca Raton, Florida.

After starting 2–8 overall and 0–6 in conference play, head coach Tom Herman was fired on November 18, 2024. Across parts of two seasons, Herman compiled a 6–16 overall record and a 3–11 conference mark. Special teams coordinator and tight ends coach Chad Lunsford was named the Owls' interim head coach. Lunsford re-hired defensive coordinator Roc Bellantoni, whom Herman had fired a week prior. On December 2, Florida Atlantic announced that Texas Tech offensive coordinator Zach Kittley had been hired as the program's new head coach.

== Transfers ==
=== Outgoing ===
Name	Pos.	New school
A'Ceon Cobb	WR	Florida A&M
Amari Wansley	S	Murray State
Armani Adams	S	Western Michigan
Arthur Jenkins	WR	Albany State
Carter Davis	K	Unknown
Casey Thompson	QB	Oklahoma
Cole Smith	IOL	Unknown
Courtney McBride Jr.	EDGE	South Alabama
Curtis Roberts	LB	Unknown
Daniel Richardson	QB	Florida A&M
Darius McClendon	S	Bowling Green
Decarius Hawthorne	DL	South Florida
Devin Price	WR	Ole Miss
Dorian Hinton	IOL	Texas A&M
Donovan Giles	WR	Arkansas–Pine Bluff
Dwight Toombs II	S	Unknown
Fin Jones	TE	South Florida
Jaden Outar	CB	Garden City CC
Jahbari Hill	CB	North Alabama
Jalen Huff	CB	Unknown
Javion Posey	WR	Unknown
Jaylen Wester	LB	Colorado
Jude Okolo	DL	Marshall
Justice Cross	LB	Murray State
Justin McKithen	WR	Old Dominion
Jymetre Hester	WR	Unknown
Kamaar Bell	IOL	South Carolina
Kobe Stewart	WR	Unknown
LaJohntay Wester	WR	Colorado
Latrell Jean	DL	Temple
Luke Rucker	QB	South Florida
Marlon Krakue	EDGE	North Alabama
Marvin Landy	TE	Unknown
Marvin Scott III	RB	Unknown
Michael Johnson Jr.	QB	Syracuse
Morven Joseph	EDGE	Jacksonville State
Robert Armes	RB	Unknown
Tony Johnson	WR	Cincinnati
Wallace Unamba	IOL	New Mexico

=== Incoming ===
Name	Pos.	Previous school
Kyler Laing	LB	Buffalo
Chisom Ifeanyi	DL	Shippensburg
Prince James Boyd Jr.	DL	Purdue
Phillip Dunnam	S	Indiana
George Johnson III	CB	UMass
Bryce Langston	DL	LSU
Kahzir Brown	CB	Maine
Dominique Henry	WR	BYU
Kasen Weisman	QB	Colorado
CJ Campbell	RB	Florida State
Kobe Stewart	WR	Maine
Marlyn Johnson	WR	Buffalo
Cam Fancher	QB	Marshall
Daughtry Richardson	OT	Florida State
Caleb Coombs	WR	Marshall
Milan Tucker	CB	Appalachian State
Ja'Kavion Nonar	OT	Maryland
Jayden George	QB	Miami (FL)
Eric Brantley Jr.	EDGE	Colorado
Devonta Davis	DL	Jackson State
EJ Horton	WR	West Virginia
Wilky Denaud	DL	Mississippi State

== Schedule ==
Date	Time	Opponent	Site	TV	Result	Attendance
August 30	7:00 p.m.	at Michigan State*	Spartan Stadium; East Lansing, MI	BTN	L 10–16	70,271
September 7	12:00 p.m.	Army	FAU Stadium; Boca Raton, FL	CBSSN	L 7–24	21,810
September 14	6:00 p.m.	FIU*	FAU Stadium; Boca Raton, FL (Shula Bowl)	ESPN+	W 38–20	24,283
September 21	7:00 p.m.	at UConn*	Pratt & Whitney Stadium at Rentschler Field; East Hartford, CT	CBSSN	L 14–48	20,144
September 28	6:00 p.m.	Wagner*	FAU Stadium; Boca Raton, FL	ESPN+	W 41–10	21,151
October 12	7:00 p.m.	North Texas	FAU Stadium; Boca Raton, FL	ESPN2	L 37–41	14,576
October 19	3:30 p.m.	at UTSA	Alamodome; San Antonio, TX	ESPN+	L 24–38	20,802
November 1	7:30 p.m.	South Florida^{†}	FAU Stadium; Boca Raton, FL (rivalry)	ESPN2	L 21–44	20,111
November 7	8:00 p.m.	at East Carolina	Dowdy–Ficklen Stadium; Greenville, NC	ESPN2	L 14–49	30,573
November 16	2:00 p.m.	at Temple	Lincoln Financial Field; Philadelphia, PA	ESPN+	L 15–18 ^{OT}	12,291
November 23	3:00 p.m.	Charlotte	FAU Stadium; Boca Raton, FL	ESPN+	L 27–39	15,066
November 30	3:30 p.m.	at Tulsa	Skelly Field at H. A. Chapman Stadium; Tulsa, OK	ESPN+	W 63–16	15,243
*Non-conference game; ^{†}Homecoming; All times are in Eastern time

== Game summaries ==
=== at Michigan State ===
Florida Atlantic Owls (0–0) at Michigan State Spartans (0–0) – Game summary

Quarter	1	2	3	4	Total
Owls	0	3	7	0	10
Spartans	2	14	0	0	16

at Spartan Stadium • East Lansing, Michigan

- Date: August 30th
- Game time: 7:00 p.m. EDT
- Game weather: Cloudy • Temperature: 84 °F (29 °C) • Wind: W at 6 miles per hour (9.7 km/h)
- Game attendance: 70,271
- Referee: Bryan Banks
- TV announcers (BTN): Jason Ross Jr. (play-by-play), Brock Vereen (analyst)

Game information

First quarter

- (7:49) MSU – Team safety (Michigan State 2–0)

Second quarter

- (11:15) MSU – Aidan Chiles 11 yard run, Jonathan Kim kick (Drive: 3 plays, 18 yards, 0:48; Michigan State 9–0)
- (9:07) MSU – Kay'Ron Lynch-Adams 63 yard run, Jonathan Kim kick (Drive: 1 plays, 63 yards, 0:10; Michigan State 16–0)
- (4:43) FAU – Morgan Suarez 43 yard field goal (Drive: 8 plays, 52 yards, 4:20; Michigan State 16–3)

Third quarter

- (0:07) FAU – Jayshon Platt 10 yard pass from Cam Fancher, Morgan Suarez kick (Drive: 7 plays, 40 yards, 2:52; Michigan State 16–10)

Fourth quarter

- No scoring plays

Statistics	FAU	MSU
First downs	19	15
Plays–yards	72–248	61–293
Rushes–yards	47–132	37–179
Passing yards	116	114
Passing: Comp–Att–Int	12–25–2	10–24–2
Time of possession	29:19	30:41

Team	Category	Player	Statistics
Florida Atlantic	Passing	Cam Fancher	12/25, 116 yards, 1 TD, 2 INT
Florida Atlantic	Rushing	Cam Fancher	25 carries, 67 yards
Florida Atlantic	Receiving	Omari Hayes	5 receptions, 74 yards
Michigan State	Passing	Aidan Chiles	10/24, 114 yards, 2 INT
Michigan State	Rushing	Kay'Ron Lynch-Adams	9 carries, 101 yards, 1 TD
Michigan State	Receiving	Michael Masunas	2 receptions, 29 yards

=== Army ===
Army Black Knights (1–0) at Florida Atlantic Owls (0–1) – Game summary

Quarter	1	2	3	4	Total
Black Knights	14	0	3	7	24
Owls	0	7	0	0	7

at FAU Stadium • Boca Raton, Florida

- Date: September 7th
- Game time: 12:00 p.m. EDT
- Game weather: Sunny • Temperature: 91 °F (33 °C) • Wind: SE at 11 miles per hour (18 km/h)
- Game attendance: 21,810
- Referee: Tim Rich
- TV announcers (CBSSN): Jordan Kent (play-by-play), Logan Ryan (analyst)

Game information

First quarter

- (8:38) ARMY – Kanye Udoh 8 yard run, Trey Gronotte kick (Drive: 8 plays, 82 yards, 4:57; Army 7–0)
- (0:47) ARMY – Casey Reynolds 44 yard pass from Bryson Daily, Trey Gronotte kick (Drive: 3 plays, 64 yards, 1:39; Army 14–0)

Second quarter

- (0:53) FAU – Omari Hayes 8 yard pass from Cam Fancher, Morgan Suarez kick (Drive: 9 plays, 68 yards, 2:44; Army 14–7)

Third quarter

- (11:00) ARMY – Trey Gronotte 35 yard field goal (Drive: 6 plays, 57 yards, 4:00; Army 17–7)

Fourth quarter

- (13:57) ARMY – Matthew Rhodes 23 yard run, Trey Gronotte kick (Drive: 15 plays, 96 yards, 10:33; Army 24–7)

Statistics	ARMY	FAU
First downs	21	16
Plays–yards	62–449	53–235
Rushes–yards	58–405	16–42
Passing yards	44	193
Passing: Comp–Att–Int	1–4–0	25–37–1
Time of possession	38:39	21:21

Team	Category	Player	Statistics
Army	Passing	Bryson Daily	1/4, 44 yards, 1 TD
Army	Rushing	Noah Short	11 carries, 160 yards
Army	Receiving	Casey Reynolds	1 reception, 44 yards, 1 TD
Florida Atlantic	Passing	Cam Fancher	25/37, 193 yards, 1 TD, 1 INT
Florida Atlantic	Rushing	CJ Campbell Jr.	8 carries, 20 yards
Florida Atlantic	Receiving	Omari Hayes	4 carries, 45 yards, 1 TD

=== FIU (Shula Bowl) ===
FIU Panthers (1–1) at Florida Atlantic Owls (0–2) – Game summary

Quarter	1	2	3	4	Total
Panthers	7	0	7	6	20
Owls	7	17	14	0	38

at FAU Stadium • Boca Raton, Florida

- Date: September 14th
- Game time: 6:00 p.m. EDT
- Game weather: Cloudy • Temperature: 91 °F (33 °C) • Wind: N at 7 miles per hour (11 km/h)
- Game attendance: 24,283
- Referee: Darryl DeBerry
- TV announcers (ESPN+): AJ Ricketts (play-by-play), Leger Douzable (analyst), Smacker Miles (sideline reporter)

Game information

First quarter

- (13:45) FIU – Eric Rivers 32 yard pass from Keyone Jenkins, Alejandro Prado kick (Drive: 3 plays, 64 yards, 1:08; FIU 7–0)
- (1:37) FAU – Zuberi Mobley 1 yard run, Morgan Suarez kick (Drive: 3 plays, 12 yards, 0:45; Tied 7–7)

Second quarter

- (10:17) FAU – Zuberi Mobley 72 yard run, Morgan Suarez kick (Drive: 6 plays, 92 yards, 4:43; Florida Atlantic 14–7)
- (6:40) FAU – Morgan Suarez 28 yard field goal (Drive: 5 plays, 27 yards, 2:13; Florida Atlantic 17–7)
- (0:03) FAU – Zuberi Mobley 1 yard run, Morgan Suarez kick (Drive: 9 plays, 63 yards, 1:14; Florida Atlantic 24–7)

Third quarter

- (7:37) FAU – Cam Fancher 12 yard run, Morgan Suarez kick (Drive: 14 plays, 75 yards, 7:23; Florida Atlantic 31–7)
- (4:28) FAU – CJ Campbell Jr. 2 yard run, Morgan Suarez kick (Drive: 4 plays, 30 yards, 1:23; Florida Atlantic 38–7)
- (0:08) FIU – Dean Patterson 26 yard pass from Keyone Jenkins, Alejandro Prado kick (Drive: 12 plays, 75 yards, 4:20; Florida Atlantic 38–14)

Fourth quarter

- (9:42) FIU – JuJu Lewis 16 yard pass from Keyone Jenkins, 2-point run failed (Drive: 7 plays, 80 yards, 2:16; Florida Atlantic 38–20)

Statistics	FIU	FAU
First downs	22	22
Plays–yards	60–368	78–420
Rushes–yards	25–87	52–259
Passing yards	281	161
Passing: Comp–Att–Int	21–35–3	14–26–0
Time of possession	22:01	37:59

Team	Category	Player	Statistics
FIU	Passing	Keyone Jenkins	21/35, 281 yards, 3 TD, 3 INT
FIU	Rushing	Lexington Joseph	7 carries, 37 yards
FIU	Receiving	Eric Rivers	4 receptions, 101 yards, 1 TD
Florida Atlantic	Passing	Cam Fancher	14/26, 161 yards
Florida Atlantic	Rushing	Zuberi Mobley	20 carries, 134 yards, 3 TD
Florida Atlantic	Receiving	CJ Campbell Jr.	4 receptions, 59 yards

=== at UConn ===
Florida Atlantic Owls (1–2) at UConn Huskies (1–2) – Game summary

Quarter	1	2	3	4	Total
Owls	0	0	7	7	14
Huskies	3	14	10	21	48

at Rentschler Field • East Hartford, Connecticut

- Date: September 21st
- Game time: 7:00 p.m. EDT
- Game weather: Cloudy • Temperature: 63 °F (17 °C) • Wind: NE at 7 miles per hour (11 km/h)
- Game attendance: 20,144
- Referee: Rory Bernard
- TV announcers (CBSSN): Jordan Kent (play-by-play), Logan Ryan (analyst) & Keiana Martin (sideline)

Game information

First quarter

- CONN - Chris Freeman 34 yd field goal, 10:09. Huskies 3–0. Drive: 10 plays, 57 yards, TOP 03:52

Second quarter

- CONN - Mel Brown 5 yd pass from Nick Evers (Chris Freeman kick), 11:32. Huskies 10–0. Drive: 12 plays, 80 yards, TOP 06:46
- CONN - Durell Robinson 8 yd run (Chris Freeman kick), 1:50. Huskies 17–0. Drive: 12 plays, 91 yards, TOP 05:56

Third quarter

- CONN - Nick Evers 3 yd run (Chris Freeman kick), 8:09. Huskies 24–0. Drive: 14 plays, 75 yards, TOP 06:51
- CONN - Chris Freeman 35 yd field goal, 5:47. Huskies 27–0. Drive: 4 plays, 6 yards, TOP 01:59
- FAU - CJ Campbell Jr. 3 yd run (Carter Davis kick), 2:17. Huskies 27–7. Drive: 8 plays, 72 yards, TOP 03:24

Fourth quarter

- CONN - Nick Evers 2 yd run (Chris Freeman kick), 14:26. Huskies 34–7. Drive: 6 plays, 75 yards, TOP 02:51
- CONN - Durell Robinson 10 yd run (Chris Freeman kick), 11:45. Huskies 41–7. Drive: 3 plays, 31 yards, TOP 01:12
- FAU - CJ Campbell Jr. 38 yd run (Carter Davis kick), 9:57. Huskies 41–14. Drive: 5 plays, 75 yards, TOP 01:48
- CONN - Shamar Porter 33 yd pass from Joe Fagnano (Chris Freeman kick), 5:02. Huskies 48–14. Drive: 7 plays, 57 yards, TOP 04:54

Statistics	FAU	CONN
First downs	9	32
Plays–yards	42–250	81–542
Rushes–yards	26–163	66–421
Passing yards	87	121
Passing: Comp–Att–Int	9–16–1	10–15–0
Time of possession	18:03	41:57

Team	Category	Player	Statistics
Florida Atlantic	Passing	Cam Fancher	9/15, 87 yards, INT
Florida Atlantic	Rushing	Cam Fancher	8 carries, 71 yards
Florida Atlantic	Receiving	Caleb Coombs	2 receptions, 28 yards
UConn	Passing	Nick Evers	9/14, 88 yards, TD
UConn	Rushing	Mel Brown	21 carries, 156 yards
UConn	Receiving	Skyler Bell	1 reception, 43 yards

=== Wagner (FCS) ===
Wagner Seahawks (FCS) (2–2) at Florida Atlantic Owls (1–3) – Game summary

Quarter	1	2	3	4	Total
Seahawks (FCS)	0	10	0	0	10
Owls	10	7	10	14	41

at FAU Stadium • Boca Raton, Florida

- Date: September 28th
- Game time: 6:00 p.m. EDT
- Game weather: Cloudy • Temperature: 90 °F (32 °C) • Wind: S at 12 miles per hour (19 km/h)
- Game attendance: 21,151
- Referee: Reid Jackson
- TV announcers (ESPN+): Ryan Urquhart (play-by-play), Patrick Murray (analyst) and Natalie Kalibat (sideline)

Game information

First quarter

- (14:28) FAU – CJ Campbell Jr. 4-yard run, Morgan Suarez kick (Drive: 2 plays, 75 yards, 0:32; Florida Atlantic 7–0)
- (8:54) FAU – Carter Davis 51-yard field goal (Drive: 9 plays, 49 yards, 3:40; Florida Atlantic 10–0)

Second quarter

- (11:52) FAU – Zuberi Mobley 22-yard run, Morgan Suarez kick (Drive: 10 plays, 77 yards, 5:23; Florida Atlantic 17–0)
- (8:22) WAG – Chase Stafford 6-yard pass from Jake Cady, Ryan Liszner kick (Drive: 10 plays, 81 yards, 3:24; Florida Atlantic 17–7)
- (2:07) WAG – Matthew Schwindt 25-yard field goal (Drive: 10 plays, 52 yards, 4:07; Florida Atlantic 17–10)

Third quarter

- (6:18) FAU – Morgan Suarez 29-yard field goal (Drive: 11 plays, 81 yards, 5:04; Florida Atlantic 20–10)
- (1:52) FAU – CJ Campbell Jr. 11-yard run, Morgan Suarez kick (Drive: 7 plays, 68 yards, 3:16; Florida Atlantic 27–10)

Fourth quarter

- (12:53) FAU – Kasen Weisman 4-yard run, Morgan Suarez kick (Drive: 5 plays, 34 yards, 1:54; Florida Atlantic 34–10)
- (5:47) FAU – Gemari Sands 1-yard run, Morgan Suarez kick (Drive: 9 plays, 68 yards, 5:02; Florida Atlantic 41–10)

Statistics	WAG	FAU
First downs	13	29
Plays–yards	58–132	71–572
Rushes–yards	26–20	46–215
Passing yards	112	257
Passing: Comp–Att–Int	11–32–0	17–25–2
Time of possession	26:15	33:45

Team	Category	Player	Statistics
Wagner	Passing	Jake Cady	11/30, 112 yards, TD
Wagner	Rushing	Rickey Spruill	8 carries, 15 yards
Wagner	Receiving	Teree McDonald	3 receptions, 43 yards
Florida Atlantic	Passing	Cam Fancher	9/12, 150 yards, INT
Florida Atlantic	Rushing	CJ Campbell Jr.	14 carries, 129 yards, 2 TD
Florida Atlantic	Receiving	Omari Hayes	6 receptions, 137 yards

=== North Texas ===
North Texas Mean Green (4–1) at Florida Atlantic Owls (2–3) – Game summary

Quarter	1	2	3	4	Total
Mean Green	14	3	10	14	41
Owls	7	20	7	3	37

at FAU Stadium • Boca Raton, Florida

- Date: October 12th
- Game time: 7:00 p.m. EDT
- Game weather: Rain • Temperature: 82 °F (28 °C) • Wind: NE at 5 miles per hour (8.0 km/h)
- Game attendance: 14,576
- Referee: Kevin Randall
- TV announcers (ESPN2): Dave Neal (play-by-play), Aaron Murray (analyst) and Ashley ShahAhmadi (sideline)

Game information

First quarter

- (10:29) UNT – Dalton Carnes 19-yard pass from Chandler Morris, Kali Nguma kick (Drive: 14 plays, 75 yards, 4:31; North Texas 7–0)
- (6:38) FAU – Omari Hayes 14-yard pass from Cam Fancher, Morgan Suarez kick (Drive: 7 plays, 75 yards, 3:51; Tied 7–7)
- (5:11) UNT – Nick Rempert 25-yard pass from Chandler Morris, Kali Nguma kick (Drive: 1 play, 25 yards, 0:08; North Texas 14–7)

Second quarter

- (14:19) FAU – Morgan Suarez 26-yard field goal (Drive: 11 plays, 71 yards, 5:45; North Texas 14–10)
- (7:34) FAU – Wyatt Sullivan 28-yard pass from Cam Fancher, Morgan Suarez kick (Drive: 10 plays, 73 yards, 5:28; Florida Atlantic 17–14)
- (4:40) UNT – Kali Nguma 46-yard field goal (Drive: 6 plays, 47 yards, 2:54; Tied 17–17)
- (1:20) FAU – Jabari Smith Jr. 5-yard pass from Cam Fancher, Morgan Suarez kick (Drive: 9 plays, 75 yards, 3:13; Florida Atlantic 24–17)
- (0:02) FAU – Morgan Suarez 32-yard field goal (Drive: 5 plays, 38 yards, 0:28; Florida Atlantic 27–17)

Third quarter

- (9:21) UNT – Makenzie McGill II 3-yard run, Kali Nguma kick (Drive: 7 plays, 65 yards, 2:40; Florida Atlantic 27–24)
- (5:06) FAU – CJ Campbell Jr. 12-yard run, Morgan Suarez kick (Drive: 1 play, 12 yards, 0:07; Florida Atlantic 34–24)
- (0:25) UNT – Kali Nguma 40-yard field goal (Drive: 10 plays, 58 yards, 4:34; Florida Atlantic 34–27)

Fourth quarter

- (4:21) FAU – Morgan Suarez 32-yard field goal (Drive: 7 plays, 18 yards, 3:41; Florida Atlantic 37–27)
- (2:38) UNT – DT Sheffield 8-yard pass from Chandler Morris, Kali Nguma kick (Drive: 8 plays, 75 yards, 1:43; Florida Atlantic 37–34)
- (0:58) UNT – DT Sheffield 3-yard pass from Chandler Morris, Kali Nguma kick (Drive: 5 plays, 58 yards, 0:45; North Texas 41–37)

Statistics	UNT	FAU
First downs	26	26
Plays–yards	71–484	74–519
Rushes–yards	26–148	43–168
Passing yards	336	351
Passing: Comp–Att–Int	27–45–1	22–31–1
Time of possession	23:50	36:10

Team	Category	Player	Statistics
North Texas	Passing	Chandler Morris	27/45, 336 yards, 4 TD, INT
North Texas	Rushing	Shane Porter	9 carries, 70 yards
North Texas	Receiving	DT Sheffield	11 receptions, 126 yards, 2 TD
Florida Atlantic	Passing	Cam Fancher	22/30, 351 yards, 3 TD, INT
Florida Atlantic	Rushing	CJ Campbell Jr.	18 carries, 89 yards, TD
Florida Atlantic	Receiving	Omari Hayes	5 receptions, 89 yards, TD

=== at UTSA ===
Florida Atlantic Owls (2–4) at UTSA Roadrunners (2–4) – Game summary

Quarter	1	2	3	4	Total
Owls	7	10	7	0	24
Roadrunners	3	0	7	14	24

at Alamodome • San Antonio, Texas

- Date: October 19th
- Game time: 3:30 p.m. EDT
- Game weather: None (played indoors)
- Game attendance: 20,802
- Referee: Darryl DeBerry
- TV announcers (ESPN+): Ted Emrich (play-by-play) and LaDarrin McLane (analyst)

Game information

First quarter

- (6:25) UTSA – Tate Sandell 33-yard field goal (Drive: 16 plays, 67 yards, 6:50; UTSA 3–0)
- (1:34) FAU – Cam Fancher 76-yard run, Morgan Suarez kick (Drive: 3 plays, 80 yards, 1:02; Florida Atlantic 7–3)

Second quarter

- (14:51) UTSA – Patrick Overmyer 42-yard pass from Owen McCown, Tate Sandell kick (Drive: 5 plays, 75 yards, 1:43; UTSA 10–7)
- (9:39) FAU – Cam Fancher 6-yard run, Morgan Suarez kick (Drive: 3 plays, 3 yards, 1:35; Florida Atlantic 14–10)
- (7:12) FAU – Carter Davis 50-yard field goal (Drive: 5 plays, 27 yards, 1:45; Florida Atlantic 17–10)
- (0:46) UTSA – Jamel Hardy 10-yard pass from Owen McCown, Tate Sandell kick (Drive: 11 plays, 88 yards, 2:35; Tied 17–17)

Third quarter

- (11:19) UTSA – Robert Henry 1-yard run, Tate Sandell kick (Drive: 9 plays, 75 yards, 3:41; UTSA 24–17)
- (3:58) FAU – Wendol Philord 49-yard fumble recovery, Morgan Suarez kick (Tied 24–24)

Fourth quarter

- (11:21) UTSA – Tate Sandell 41-yard field goal (Drive: 8 plays, 38 yards, 3:25; UTSA 27–24)
- (8:00) UTSA – Tate Sandell 27-yard field goal (Drive: 7 plays, 14 yards, 2:30; UTSA 30–24)
- (2:25) UTSA – Brandon High 29-yard run, Robert Henry rush (Drive: 8 plays, 62 yards, 4:02; UTSA 38–24)

Statistics	FAU	UTSA
First downs	10	26
Plays–yards	54–203	89–485
Rushes–yards	33–100	44–145
Passing yards	103	340
Passing: Comp–Att–Int	10–21–1	26–45–2
Time of possession	24:18	35:42

Team	Category	Player	Statistics
Florida Atlantic	Passing	Cam Fancher	9/19, 96 yards
Florida Atlantic	Rushing	Cam Fancher	15 carries, 56 yards, 2 TD
Florida Atlantic	Receiving	Caleb Coombs	4 receptions, 61 yards
UTSA	Passing	Owen McCown	26/45, 340 yards, 2 TD, 2 INT
UTSA	Rushing	Brandon High	9 carries, 65 yards, TD
UTSA	Receiving	Houston Thomas	3 receptions, 63 yards

=== South Florida ===
South Florida Bulls (3–4) at Florida Atlantic Owls (2–5) – Game summary

Quarter	1	2	3	4	Total
Bulls	0	7	24	13	44
Owls	7	7	7	0	21

at FAU Stadium • Boca Raton, Florida

- Date: November 1st
- Game time: 7:30 p.m. EDT
- Game weather: Sunny
- Game attendance: 20,111
- Referee: Edwin Lee
- TV announcers (ESPN2): Anish Shroff (play-by-play), Andre Ware (analyst) and Paul Carcaterra (sideline)

Game information

First quarter

- (2:09) FAU – CJ Campbell Jr. 9-yard run, Morgan Suarez kick (Drive: 9 plays, 72 yards, 4:28; Florida Atlantic 7–0)

Second quarter

- (7:48) USF – Nay'Quan Wright 64-yard run, John Cannon kick (Drive: 2 plays, 68 yards, 0:33; Tied 7–7)
- (4:45) FAU – CJ Campbell Jr. 30-yard run, Morgan Suarez kick (Drive: 7 plays, 75 yards, 3:03; Florida Atlantic 14–7)

Third quarter

- (12:30) USF – Bryce Archie 1-yard run, John Cannon kick (Drive: 6 plays, 61 yards, 1:39; Tied 14–14)
- (10:25) FAU – CJ Campbell Jr. 63-yard pass from Cam Fancher, Morgan Suarez kick (Drive: 4 plays, 81 yards, 1:57; Florida Atlantic 21–14)
- (7:22) USF – Sean Atkins 13-yard pass from Bryce Archie, John Cannon kick (Drive: 11 plays, 75 yards, 3:03; Tied 21–21)
- (2:25) USF – John Cannon 34-yard field goal (Drive: 6 plays, 58 yards, 1:57; South Florida 24–21)
- (0:46) USF – Kelley Joiner 3-yard pass from Bryce Archie, John Cannon kick (Drive: 4 plays, 22 yards, 1:25; South Florida 31–21)

Fourth quarter

- (12:34) USF – Kelley Joiner 17-yard run, John Cannon kick (Drive: 5 plays, 61 yards, 2:00; South Florida 38–21)
- (10:57) USF – Ta'Ron Keith 42-yard run (Drive: 1 play, 42 yards, 0:09; South Florida 44–21)

Statistics	USF	FAU
First downs	25	22
Plays–yards	75–525	80–485
Rushes–yards	43–319	38–179
Passing yards	206	306
Passing: Comp–Att–Int	19–32–0	22–42–0
Time of possession	26:15	33:45

Team	Category	Player	Statistics
South Florida	Passing	Bryce Archie	19/32, 206 yards, 2 TD
South Florida	Rushing	Nay'Quan Wright	17 carries, 117 yards, TD
South Florida	Receiving	Sean Atkins	6 receptions, 57 yards, TD
Florida Atlantic	Passing	Cam Fancher	22/42, 306 yards, TD
Florida Atlantic	Rushing	CJ Campbell Jr.	12 carries, 90 yards, 2 TD
Florida Atlantic	Receiving	CJ Campbell Jr.	5 receptions, 78 yards, TD

=== at East Carolina ===
Florida Atlantic Owls (2–6) at East Carolina Pirates (4–4) – Game summary

Quarter	1	2	3	4	Total
Owls	0	7	0	7	14
Pirates	21	14	7	7	49

at Dowdy–Ficklen Stadium • Greenville, North Carolina

- Date: November 7th
- Game time: 8:00 p.m. EST
- Game weather: Clear • Temperature: 68 °F (20 °C) • Wind: SW 2 miles per hour (3.2 km/h)
- Game attendance: 30,573
- Referee: Tim Rich
- TV announcers (ESPN2): Taylor Zarzour (play-by-play), Matt Stinchcomb (analyst) and Alyssa Lang (sideline)

Game information

First quarter

- (14:36) ECU – Chase Sowell 50-yard pass from Katin Houser, Andrew Conrad kick (Drive: 2 plays, 75 yards, 0:24; East Carolina 7–0)
- (10:33) ECU – Winston Wright Jr. 47-yard pass from Katin Houser, Andrew Conrad kick (Drive: 4 plays, 78 yards, 1:56; East Carolina 14–0)
- (2:56) ECU – Winston Wright Jr. 8-yard pass from Katin Houser, Andrew Conrad kick (Drive: 9 plays, 80 yards, 2:57; East Carolina 21–0)

Second quarter

- (6:07) FAU – Jabari Smith Jr. 2-yard pass from Kasen Weisman, Morgan Suarez kick (Drive: 12 plays, 66 yards, 6:23; East Carolina 21–7)
- (1:18) ECU – Rahjai Harris 1-yard run, Andrew Conrad kick (Drive: 3 plays, 73 yards, 0:37; East Carolina 28–7)
- (0:17) ECU – Katin Houser 35-yard run, Andrew Conrad kick (Drive: 5 plays, 59 yards, 0:30; East Carolina 35–7)

Third quarter

- (7:05) ECU – Anthony Smith 46-yard pass from Katin Houser, Andrew Conrad kick (Drive: 6 plays, 80 yards, 2:32; East Carolina 42–7)

Fourth quarter

- (7:25) ECU – Jayvontay Conner 2-yard pass from Katin Houser, Andrew Conrad kick (Drive: 16 plays, 80 yards, 8:13; East Carolina 49–7)
- (1:07) FAU – CJ Campbell Jr. 2-yard pass from Kasen Weisman, Morgan Suarez kick (Drive: 15 plays, 81 yards, 6:14; East Carolina 49–14)

Statistics	FAU	ECU
First downs	20	23
Plays–yards	75–399	56–581
Rushes–yards	32–137	34–238
Passing yards	262	343
Passing: Comp–Att–Int	25–43–2	17–22–0
Time of possession	36:48	23:12

Team	Category	Player	Statistics
Florida Atlantic	Passing	Kasen Weisman	20/35, 188 yards, 2 TD, INT
Florida Atlantic	Rushing	Kasen Weisman	6 carries, 41 yards
Florida Atlantic	Receiving	Jabari Smith Jr.	5 receptions, 64 yards, TD
East Carolina	Passing	Katin Houser	17/22, 343 yards, 5 TD
East Carolina	Rushing	Jhari Patterson	3 carries, 61 yards
East Carolina	Receiving	Anthony Smith	3 receptions, 120 yards, TD

=== at Temple ===
Florida Atlantic Owls (2–7) at Temple Owls (2–7) – Game summary

Quarter	1	2	3	4	OT	Total
Florida Atlantic	0	7	0	8	0	15
Temple	3	0	3	9	3	18

at Lincoln Financial Field • Philadelphia, Pennsylvania

- Date: November 16th
- Game time: 2:00 p.m. EST
- Game weather: Sunny • Temperature: 61 °F (16 °C) • Wind: NW 13 miles per hour (21 km/h)
- Game attendance: 12,291
- Referee: Steve Anderson
- TV announcers (ESPN+): James Westling (play-by-play) and Barrett Brooks (analyst)

Game information

First quarter

- (11:52) TEM – Maddux Trujillo 54-yard field goal (Drive: 6 plays, 22 yards, 3:02; Temple 3–0)

Second quarter

- (11:53) FAU – C. J. Campbell Jr., 1-yard run, Morgan Suarez kick (Drive: 8 plays, 82 yards, 3:07; Florida Atlantic 7–3)

Third quarter

- (4:22) TEM – Maddux Trujillo 50-yard field goal (Drive: 7 plays, 24 yards, 2:21; Florida Atlantic 7–6)

Fourth quarter

- (7:15) TEM – Terrez Worthy 1-yard run (Drive: 15 plays, 87 yards, 8:45; Temple 12–7)
- (1:52) TEM – Maddux Trujillo 47-yard field goal (Drive: 8 plays, 40 yards, 4:21; Temple 15–7)
- (0:34) FAU – C. J. Campbell Jr., 1-yard run, Tyriq Starks pass (Drive: 9 plays, 75 yards, 1:18; Tied 15–15)

Overtime

- (0:00) TEM – Maddux Trujillo 39-yard field goal (Drive: 4 plays, 4 yards, 0:00; Temple 18–15)

Statistics	FAU	TEM
First downs	17	18
Plays–yards	67–317	80–348
Rushes–yards	31–123	39–130
Passing yards	194	218
Passing: Comp–Att–Int	19–36–0	24–41–0
Time of possession	22:59	37:01

Team	Category	Player	Statistics
Florida Atlantic	Passing	Kasen Weisman	11/23, 123 yards
Florida Atlantic	Rushing	C. J. Campbell Jr.	20 carries, 70 yards, 2 TD
Florida Atlantic	Receiving	C. J. Campbell Jr.	6 receptions, 57 yards
Temple	Passing	Evan Simon	24/41, 218 yards
Temple	Rushing	Antwain Littleton	13 carries, 54 yards
Temple	Receiving	Dante Wright	14 receptions, 147 yards

=== Charlotte ===
Charlotte 49ers (3–7) at Florida Atlantic Owls (2–8) – Game summary

Quarter	1	2	3	4	Total
49ers	10	6	10	13	39
Owls	3	7	10	7	27

at FAU Stadium • Boca Raton, Florida

- Date: November 23rd
- Game time: 3:00 p.m. EST
- Game weather: Sunny, 69 °F (21 °C)
- Game attendance: 15,066
- Referee: Tim Rich
- TV announcers (ESPN+): Ryan Urquhart (play-by-play), Patrick Murray (analyst) and Natalie Kalibat (sideline)

Game information

First quarter

- (10:36) FAU – Morgan Suarez 20-yard field goal (Drive: 9 plays, 72 yards, 4:24; Florida Atlantic 3–0)
- (8:38) CHA – O'Mega Blake 54-yard pass from Deshawn Purdie, Stephen Rusnak kick (Drive: 4 plays, 75 yards, 1:58; Charlotte 7–3)
- (6:52) CHA – Stephen Rusnak 50-yard field goal (Drive: 4 plays, 3 yards, 0:55; Charlotte 10–3)

Second quarter

- (8:59) CHA – Stephen Rusnak 45-yard field goal (Drive: 7 plays, 66 yards, 3:39; Charlotte 13–3)
- (4:59) FAU – Xavier Terrell 21-yard run, Morgan Suarez kick (Drive: 9 plays, 68 yards, 3:54; Charlotte 13–10)
- (0:34) CHA – Stephen Rusnak 20-yard field goal (Drive: 11 plays, 72 yards, 4:25; Charlotte 16–10)

Third quarter

- (10:11) CHA – Stephen Rusnak 40-yard field goal (Drive: 9 plays, 52 yards, 4:49; Charlotte 19–10)
- (1:59) FAU – Morgan Suarez 24-yard field goal (Drive: 13 plays, 69 yards, 8:12; Charlotte 19–13)
- (1:47) CHA – O'Mega Blake 75-yard pass from Deshawn Purdie, Stephen Rusnak kick (Drive: 1 play, 75 yards, 0:12; Charlotte 26–13)
- (0:49) FAU – Omari Hayes 65-yard pass from Tyriq Starks, Morgan Suarez kick (Drive: 3 plays, 75 yards, 0:58; Charlotte 26–20)

Fourth quarter

- (11:36) FAU – CJ Campbell Jr. 58-yard run, Morgan Suarez kick (Drive: 7 plays, 93 yards, 3:08; Florida Atlantic 27–26)
- (5:25) CHA – O'Mega Blake 47-yard pass from Deshawn Purdie (Drive: 6 plays, 81 yards, 2:15; Charlotte 32–27)
- (2:05) CHA – Katron Evans 22-yard fumble recovery, Stephen Rusnak kick (Charlotte 39–27)

Statistics	CLT	FAU
First downs	13	22
Plays–yards	54–442	73–458
Rushes–yards	24–46	50–279
Passing yards	396	179
Passing: Comp–Att–Int	16–30–1	12–23–0
Time of possession	23:59	36:01

Team	Category	Player	Statistics
Charlotte	Passing	Deshawn Purdie	16/30, 396 yards, 3 TD, INT
Charlotte	Rushing	Cartevious Norton	14 carries, 38 yards
Charlotte	Receiving	O'Mega Blake	5 receptions, 205 yards, 3 TD
Florida Atlantic	Passing	Tyriq Starks	12/23, 179 yards, TD
Florida Atlantic	Rushing	CJ Campbell Jr.	21 carries, 150 yards, TD
Florida Atlantic	Receiving	Omari Hayes	1 reception, 65 yards, TD

=== at Tulsa ===
Florida Atlantic Owls (2–9) at Tulsa Golden Hurricane (3–8) – Game summary

Quarter	1	2	3	4	Total
Owls	0	0	0	0	0
Golden Hurricane	0	0	0	0	0

at H. A. Chapman Stadium • Tulsa, Oklahoma

- Date: November 30th
- Game time: 3:30 p.m. EST
- TV announcers (ESPN+): James Westling (play-by-play), Patrick Murray (analyst) and Smacker Miles (sideline)

Game information

First quarter

Second quarter

Third quarter

Fourth quarter

Statistics	FAU	TLSA
First downs		
Plays–yards	–	–
Rushes–yards	–	–
Passing yards		
Passing: Comp–Att–Int	––	––
Time of possession		

Team	Category	Player	Statistics
Florida Atlantic	Passing		
Florida Atlantic	Rushing		
Florida Atlantic	Receiving		
Tulsa	Passing		
Tulsa	Rushing		
Tulsa	Receiving		
