= 2024 Charlotte 49ers football team =

American college football season

2024 Charlotte 49ers football
- Conference: American Athletic Conference
- Record: 5–7 (4–4 AAC)
- Head coach: Biff Poggi (2nd season; first 10 games); Tim Brewster (interim; final 2 games)
- Offensive coordinator: Mike Miller (2nd season)
- Offensive scheme: Pro-style
- Defensive coordinator: Ryan Osborn (2nd season)
- Base defense: 4–3
- Home stadium: Jerry Richardson Stadium

Uniform
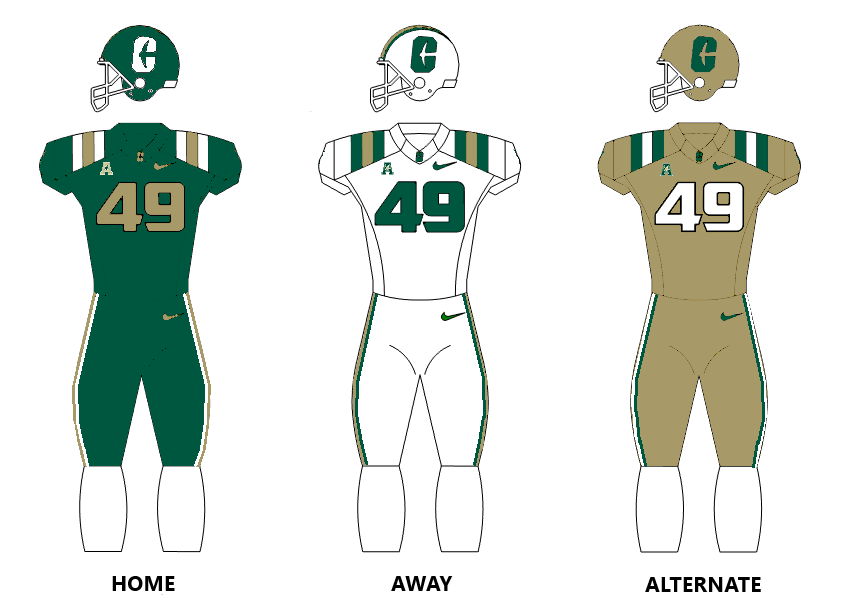

2024 American Athletic Conference football standings
	Conf.			Overall
Team	W		L	W		L
No. 21 Army y$	8	–	0	12	–	2
Tulane y	7	–	1	9	–	5
Navy	6	–	2	10	–	3
No. 24 Memphis	6	–	2	11	–	2
East Carolina	5	–	3	8	–	5
South Florida	4	–	4	7	–	6
UTSA	4	–	4	7	–	6
Charlotte	4	–	4	5	–	7
North Texas	3	–	5	6	–	7
Rice	3	–	5	4	–	8
Temple	2	–	6	3	–	9
UAB	2	–	6	3	–	9
Florida Atlantic	1	–	7	3	–	9
Tulsa	1	–	7	3	–	9
Championship: Army 35, Tulane 14
$ – Conference champion; y – Championship game participant; Rankings from AP Poll

The 2024 Charlotte 49ers football team represented the University of North Carolina at Charlotte in the 2024 NCAA Division I FBS football season. The 49ers played their home games at Jerry Richardson Stadium in Charlotte, North Carolina, and competed in their second season as a member of the American Athletic Conference (AAC).

The 49ers were led by second-year head coach Biff Poggi for their first 10 games. Poggi was fired two days after a 59–24 loss to South Florida, with tight ends coach/associate head coach Tim Brewster being named interim head coach.

== Coaching staff ==
On December 4, offensive line coach and assistant head coach Kyle DeVan accepted the offensive line coach job at his alma mater, Oregon State. On December 7 the 49ers announced the hiring of Colorado tight ends coach Tim Brewster for the same position at Charlotte. He also takes on assistant head coaching duties from the departing DeVan. John Morookian made an internal move from tight ends to offensive line. Jason Barnes joined the coaching staff from the analyst pool to take over wide receivers. On January 8, North Carolina defensive analyst Ty Greenwood was named cornerbacks coach.

Name	Position	Seasons at Charlotte	Alma mater	Previous
Biff Poggi	Head coach	2	Duke (1984)	Associate head coach (Michigan)
Tim Brewster	Associate head coach/tight ends coach	1	Illinois (1983)	Tight ends (Colorado)
Jonathon Jacobson	Assistant head coach/senior advisor	2	Penn (1984)	Chairman of HighSage Ventures
Mike Miller	Offensive coordinator/quarterbacks coach	2	UAB (2014)	Co-offensive coordinator/Tight ends (Maryland)
Ryan Osborn	Defensive coordinator/outside linebackers coach	2	Bridgewater State (2010)	Defensive assistant (Baltimore Ravens)
Jason Barnes	Wide receivers coach	1	So. Car. (2010)	Offensive Analyst (Coastal Car.)
Wayne Dorsey	Defensive line coach	2	Ole Miss (2018)	Defensive line coach (Saint Frances Academy)
Greg Froelich	Running backs coach/special teams coordinator	2	Michigan (2017)	Special teams analyst (Illinois)
Ty Greenwood	Cornerbacks coach	1	Delaware St (2004)	Defensive analyst (North Carolina)
Greer Martini	Linebackers coach	2	Notre Dame (2018)	Graduate assistant (LSU)
John Morookian	Offensive line	2	Toledo (2011)	Offensive analyst (Michigan)
Justin Sanders	Safeties coach	2	Illinois (2012)	Defensive backs coach (Texas Southern)

== Recruiting ==
=== Recruiting class ===
The following recruits and transfers have signed letters of intent or verbally committed to the Charlotte 49ers football program for the 2024 recruiting year.

College recruiting (2024)
Name	Hometown	School	Height	Weight	40^{‡}	Commit date
Connor Adair; TE	,	IMG Academy	6 ft 3 in (1.91 m)	235 lb (107 kg)	–	
Connor Adair; TE	Recruit ratings: No ratings found					
Cornell Allen; S	Richmond, VA	Trinity Episcopal	5 ft 10 in (1.78 m)	165 lb (75 kg)	–	Jun 25, 2023
Cornell Allen; S	Recruit ratings: Scout: Rivals: 247Sports: ESPN:					
Evan Austin; ATH	Ijamsville, MD	Oakdale HS	6 ft 0 in (1.83 m)	175 lb (79 kg)	–	Jun 21, 2023
Evan Austin; ATH	Recruit ratings: Scout: Rivals: 247Sports:					
Kendal Brown; Edge	Lithonia, GA	Arabia Mountain HS	6 ft 4 in (1.93 m)	220 lb (100 kg)	–	Jun 18, 2023
Kendal Brown; Edge	Recruit ratings: Scout: 247Sports:					
Miles Burris; WR	Jacksonville, FL	Trinity Christian Academy	6 ft 2 in (1.88 m)	187 lb (85 kg)	–	Jun 16, 2023
Miles Burris; WR	Recruit ratings: Scout: Rivals: 247Sports:					
Andrew Cunningham; OL	Southlake, TX	Carroll Senior HS	6 ft 3 in (1.91 m)	275 lb (125 kg)	–	Jul 1, 2023
Andrew Cunningham; OL	Recruit ratings: No ratings found					
Kainoa Davis; Edge	Santa Ana, CA	Mater Dei HS	6 ft 5 in (1.96 m)	285 lb (129 kg)	–	Oct 23, 2023
Kainoa Davis; Edge	Recruit ratings: Scout: Rivals: 247Sports:					
De'Gabriel Floyd; LB	Westlake Village, CA	Westlake HS	6 ft 2 in (1.88 m)	235 lb (107 kg)	–	Oct 10, 2023
De'Gabriel Floyd; LB	Recruit ratings: Rivals:					
Rod Gainey Jr. RB	Tampa, FL	Tampa Bay Tech	6 ft 0 in (1.83 m)	210 lb (95 kg)	–	Jun 26, 2023
Rod Gainey Jr. RB	Recruit ratings: Scout: Rivals: 247Sports: ESPN:					
Cary Grant; DB	New Orleans, LA	Warren Easton	6 ft 2 in (1.88 m)	185 lb (84 kg)	–	
Cary Grant; DB	Recruit ratings: No ratings found					
Grant Laskey; TE	Valdosta, GA	Lowndes HS	6 ft 5 in (1.96 m)	230 lb (100 kg)	–	Jun 12, 2023
Grant Laskey; TE	Recruit ratings: Scout: 247Sports:					
Tre McLeod; RB	Wyncote, PA	Cheltenham HS	5 ft 10 in (1.78 m)	190 lb (86 kg)	–	Sep 19, 2023
Tre McLeod; RB	Recruit ratings: Scout: Rivals: 247Sports:					
Deshawn Purdie; QB	Baltimore, MD	Milford Mill Academy	6 ft 4 in (1.93 m)	205 lb (93 kg)	–	Mar 22, 2023
Deshawn Purdie; QB	Recruit ratings: Scout: Rivals: 247Sports: ESPN:					
Umar Rockhead; OT	Charlotte, NC	Mallard Creek High School	6 ft 5 in (1.96 m)	265 lb (120 kg)	–	Jun 18, 2023
Umar Rockhead; OT	Recruit ratings: Scout: Rivals: 247Sports:					
Dominic Silva; OT	Bridgewater, MA	Dexter Southfield School	6 ft 6 in (1.98 m)	320 lb (150 kg)	–	Jun 20, 2023
Dominic Silva; OT	Recruit ratings: Scout: Rivals: 247Sports:					
Darius Wallace; LB	Suwanee, GA	Peachtree Ridge HS	6 ft 3 in (1.91 m)	230 lb (100 kg)	–	
Darius Wallace; LB	Recruit ratings: No ratings found					
Cam'Ron Warren; OT	Chesapeake, VA	Western Branch HS	6 ft 4 in (1.93 m)	290 lb (130 kg)	–	
Cam'Ron Warren; OT	Recruit ratings: 247Sports:					
Kam Weaver; LB	Andalusia, AL	Andalusia HS	6 ft 1 in (1.85 m)	205 lb (93 kg)	–	Jul 9, 2023
Kam Weaver; LB	Recruit ratings: Scout: 247Sports:					
DeQuinder Williams; CB	Charlotte, NC	West Charlotte HS	6 ft 0 in (1.83 m)	175 lb (79 kg)	–	
DeQuinder Williams; CB	Recruit ratings: No ratings found					
			N/A	N/A	–	
Recruit ratings: No ratings found
Overall recruit ranking: Rivals: NA ESPN: NA
‡ Refers to 40-yard dash; Note: In many cases, Scout, Rivals, 247Sports, On3, and ESPN may conflict in their listings of height, weight and 40 time.; In these cases, the average was taken. ESPN grades are on a 100-point scale.; Sources: "Charlotte Football Commitments". Rivals.; "2024 Charlotte Football Commits". Scout.; "ESPN". ESPN.; "Scout.com Team Recruiting Rankings". Scout.; "2024 Team Ranking". Rivals.com.

=== Key transfers ===
Player	Position	Previous	Home Town	High School	Class	Height	Weight
Al-Ma'hi Ali	Defensive back	Saint Francis	Philadelphia, PA	Saint Frances Academy	JR	5'-11"	175 lbs
Sammy Anderson Jr.	Cornerback	Cincinnati	Dayton, OH	Trotwood-Madison	RS-JR	6'-2"	170 lbs
O'Mega Blake	Wide receiver	East Carolina	Rock Hill, SC	South Pointe	RS-JR	6'-2"	180 lbs
Trevon Booker	Cornerback	Campbell	Indianapolis, IN	Lawrence Central	SR	6'-1"	175 lbs
Max Brown	Quarterback	Florida	Tulsa, OK	Lincoln Christian School	RS-FR	6'-3"	200 lbs
Eltayeb Bushra	Safety	Fairmont State	Herndon, VA	Herndon	JR	6'-2"	200 lbs
Dre Butler	Defensive lineman	Michigan State	Covington, GA	Newton	GS	6'-5"	300 lbs
CJ Clinkscales	Cornerback	Boston College	Buford, GA	Buford	RS-FR	5'-7"	173 lbs
Mo Clipper Jr.	Inside offensive lineman	Tennessee	Alpharetta, GA	Milton	RS-FR	6'-4"	305 lbs
Antonio Cotman Jr.	Cornerback	Virginia Tech	Colonial Heights, VA	Life Christian Academy	FR	6'-2"	192 lbs
Derrick Edwards	Safety	Louisville	Cocoa, FL	Space Coast	RS-SO	5'-11"	175 lbs
Tyler Gibson	Offensive tackle	Georgia Tech	Alpharetta, GA	Johns Creek	RS-FR	6'-5"	288 lbs
Montez Green	Wide receiver	Bridgewater	Greenville, NC	JH Rose	SO	6'-1"	180 lbs
Jonny Hassard	Offensive tackle	UMass	Mount Ulla, NC	West Rowan	SR	6'-4"	275 lbs
William Hawkins IV	Wide receiver	Miami (FL)	Wake Forest, NC	Heritage	RS-FR	6'-4"	205 lbs
Jordan Herman	Offensive tackle	Florida	Hutchinson, KS	Fort Mill	RS-SO	6'-8"	370 lbs
Adam Hopkins	Cornerback	Colorado	Thomasville, GA	Thomas County Central	FR	5'-11"	174 lbs
Aidan Kaler	Linebacker	Stony Brook	Sayville, NY	Sayville	SR	6'-2"	230 lbs
Bronson Long	Placekicker	South Dakota Mines	Gothenburg, NE	Gothenburg	RS-FR	6'-4"	200 lbs
D'Andre Martin	EDGE	South Carolina	Colonial Heights, VA	Life Christian Academy	RS-FR	6'-4"	306 lbs
Mitchell Mayes	Offensive tackle	Clemson	Raleigh, NC	Leesville Road	SR	6'-3.5"	305 lbs
Treyveon McGee	Safety	Iowa State	Detroit, MI	Ypsilanti	RS-JR	6'-2"	205 lbs
Avery Morris	Linebacker	UTSA	Humble, TX	Atascocita	SR	6'-2"	204 lbs
Cartevious Norton	Running back	Iowa State	Waycross, GA	Ware County	SO	5'-11"	210 lbs
Justin Olson	Wide receiver	Middle Tennessee	Huntersville, NC	North Mecklenburg	SR	6'-2"	190 lbs
Anthony Romphf	Cornerback	Western Michigan	Southfield, MI	Southfield	RS-JR	6'-0"	180 lbs
Xavier Simmons	Linebacker	Missouri	Greensboro, NC	Northwest Guilford	RS-FR	6'-3"	225 lbs
Stephen Sings V	EDGE	Auburn	Charlotte, NC	Chambers	JR	6'-3"	225 lbs
Jordan Spasojevic-Moko	Inside offensive lineman	Texas A&M	Brisbane, Queensland, Australia	Brisbane Rhinos	RS-JR	6'-5"	300 lbs
Donovan Spellman	Offensive tackle	Appalachian State	Clayton, NC	Knightdale	SO	6'-4"	210 lbs
CJ Stokes	Running back	Michigan	Columbia, SC	Hammond School	SO	5'-10"	188 lbs
Andre Washington	Quarterback	South Carolina State	Hopkins, SC	Ridge View	FR	6'-4"	215 lbs
Chantz Williams	EDGE	Miami (FL)	Orange Park, FL	Oakleaf	JR	6'-4"	240 lbs

=== Departing players ===
==== Outgoing transfers ====
Player	Position	New School
John Anderson	S	None
Panda Askew	IOL	East Carolina
Brian Bates	LB	Delaware State
Carson Black	QB	Catawba
Micah Bowens	QB	Bethune–Cookman
Derek Boykins	LB	None
Jaden Bradley	WR	UNLV
Tymere Burton	LB	East Mississippi CC
TJ Butler	EDGE	None
Shadrick Byrd	RB	Withdrawn
Nico Crawford	LS	Pittsburgh
Jordan Daniels	OL	Western Carolina
Ephraim Deese	DL	Iowa Western CC
Damani Dent	S	Mississippi Gulf Coast CC
Keoni Denny	LB	None
Elisha Edwards	WR	Keiser
Dontez Fagan	CB	West Virginia
Charlie Fish	WR	Wisconsin–La Crosse
Marshall Futrell	OL	Slippery Rock
Ja'Khi Green	OT	UConn
Jai'Lun Hampton	OL	UT Martin
Jack Hestera	WR	Utah State
Nikhai Hill-Green	LB	Colorado
Kameron Howard	S	Alabama
Miguel Jackson	DL	Utah State
Andrew Jacobs	WR	Youngstown State
Demetrius Knight Jr.	LB	South Carolina
Manning Lasso	WR	None
Rene Miller	OL	None
Arabee Muslim	OT	None
Doug Newsome	CB	UT Martin
Omari Orgertrice	S	Johnson C. Smith
Steven Parker	S	Alabama A&M
Quinten Patten	WR	None
BJ Ragland	DL	Chattanooga
Durell Robinson	RB	UConn
Micah Sumpter	OT	East Tennessee State
Roger Walters	WR	Iowa Western CC
Issac Washington	DL	Grambling State
Ezekiel Zeff	DL	None

=== Roster ===
2024 Charlotte 49ers football team roster
Players
Coaches
Offense

Pos.	#	Name	Class
RB	0	Terron Kellman	RSo
QB	1	Max Brown	RSo
WR	2	Isaiah Myers	RSo
WR	3	Jarius Mack	RJr
WR	4	Justin Olson	GS
RB	5	Cartevious Norton	Jr
RB	6	Rod Gainey Jr.	Fr
WR	7	Terez Traynor	RSr
WR	8	Sean Brown	GS
WR	9	O'Mega Blake	RJr
WR	10	Duane Thomas Jr.	So
QB	11	Trexler Ivey	RJr
QB	12	Andre Washington	So
WR	14	Adam Hopkins IV	RFr
QB	15	Deshawn Purdie	Fr
QB	16	Tanner Bushee	Fr
TE	17	Gus McGee	RJr
TE	18	Colin Weber	RJr
WR	19	Xander Lamb	RSo
RB	21	Henry Rutledge	RJr
WR	22	Jack Reynolds	RJr
RB	23	CJ Stokes	RSo
TE	34	Connor Adair	Fr
TE	35	Joey Bearns III	RJr
TE	36	Brady Rhoads	Fr
RB	37	Duke Guenther	Fr
WR	37	Ike White	RSo
RB	38	Hahsaun Wilson	RJr
RB	39	Jake Simmons	Fr
RB	41	Jake Davids	Fr
OL	51	Aiden Martinez	Fr
OL	52	Jonny King	RJr
OL	53	Kendall Stanley	RSo
OL	55	Mo Clipper Jr.	RSo
OL	56	Andrew Adair	RJr
OL	57	Jameson Jensen	Fr
OL	58	Jonny Hassard	RSr
OL	62	Andrew Cunningham	Fr
OL	65	Boston Brinkley	RSo
OL	66	Jordan Spasojevic-Moko	RJr
OL	67	Dom Silvia	Fr
OL	71	P.J. Wilkins	RFr
OL	72	Dominick Kelley	RFr
OL	73	Umar Rockhead	Fr
OL	74	Tyler Gibson	RSo
OL	76	Isaiah Bullerdick	RSo
OL	77	Mitchell Mayes	Sr
OL	79	Jordan Herman	RSo
TE	80	Grant Laskey	Fr
TE	81	Jake Clemons	Sr
WR	82	Evan Austin	Fr
WR	83	Jacob Hamilton	Fr
TE	85	Jason Jeffares	RFr
TE	86	Bryce Kennon	Sr
WR	87	Montez Green	Jr
WR	88	Miles Burris	Fr
WR	89	Derrick Eley	Fr

Defense

Pos.	#	Name	Class
DB	0	Al-Ma'hi Ali	Jr
DB	1	Dontae Balfour	Jr
DB	2	Treyveon McGee	RSr
DL	3	Demon Clowney	RJr
DB	4	C.J. Burton	Sr
DB	5	Antonio Cotman Jr.	RFr
DB	6	Ja'Qurious Conley	RJr
LB	7	Stone Handy	RSr
LB	8	Cam Burden	RJr
DB	9	Cary Grant	Jr
LB	10	Ositadinma Ekwonu	RSr
DB	11	Elijah Culp	RJr
DB	12	CJ Clinkscales	RSo
DL	14	Chantz Williams	RSr
DE	15	Lacota Dippre	RFr
DL	17	Mike Kelly-Lawson	RSr
DL	18	Zion Shockley	RJr
LB	19	Donovan Spellman	Jr
DB	20	Trevon Booker	RSr
DB	21	Breon Noel	RJr
DB	22	DeQuinder Williams II	Fr
DL	23	Charlie Jackson	RSr
DB	24	Tequan Lattimore	RJr
LB	25	Prince Bemah	RSr
LB	26	Xavier Simmons	RSo
DB	28	Cornell Allen	Fr
DB	29	Maguire Neal	Jr
DB	30	Derrick Edwards	RJr
DL	31	Stephen Sings V	Sr
DB	32	Mordecai McDaniel	RJr
DB	33	Seth Franklin	RFr
DB	34	Kameron Manley	Fr
DB	36	Aydan Cannon	Fr
DB	38	Jamari Broady	RSo
LB	39	Aidan Kaler	GS
LB	40	Reid Williford	Jr
LB	41	Justin Hayes	RFr
LB	42	Jonathon Okate	RSo
DB	43	Randy Franklin	RJr
DB	45	Jaavan Mack	Jr
DL	48	Malik Puryear	RJr
DL	53	Kainoa Davis	Fr
DL	55	Colin Coates	So
LB	56	Avery Morris	GS
LB	57	Darius Wallace	Fr
DL	88	Katron Evans	RJr
DL	90	Dez Morgan	Sr
DL	91	Dre Butler	GS
DL	92	Ayo Tifase	RSo
DL	94	Kendal Brown	Fr
DL	97	Jalar Holley	RSr
DL	98	Jefferson Lambert	RSo
DL	99	Dre Martin	RSo

Special teams

Pos.	#	Name	Class
K	44	Hunter Patrick	RJr
LS	45	Anthony Saragusa	Fr
LS	50	Zach Billings	RJr
LS	54	Adam Booker	RSo
P	92	Andrew Bennett	Fr
K	94	Kyle Cunanan	So
K	95	Bronson Long	RSo
P	96	Michael O'Shaughnessy	GS
K	98	Vasilios Fotopoulos	Fr
K	99	Stephen Rusnak	RJr

Head coach

- Biff Poggi (Duke)

Coordinators/assistant coaches

- Tim Brewster (Illinois)
  Associate head coach/tight ends
- Jonathon Jacobson (Penn)
  Assistant head coach/senior advisor
- Mike Miller (UAB)
  Offensive coordinator/quarterbacks
- Ryan Osborn (Bridgewater State)
  Defensive coordinator/outside linebackers
- Jason Barnes (South Carolina)
  Wide receivers
- Wayne Dorsey (Mississippi)
  Defensive line
- Greg Froelich (Michigan)
  Special teams coordinator/running backs
- Ty Greenwood (Delaware State)
  Cornerbacks
- Greer Martini (Notre Dame)
  Linebackers
- John Morookian (Toledo)
  Offensive tackles/tight ends
- Justin Sanders (Illinois)
  Safeties
- Lewis Caralla (Defiance)
  Chief of staff/director of strength & conditioning

Legend

- (C) Team captain
- (S) Suspended
- (I) Ineligible
- Injured
- Redshirt

Roster

=== Depth chart ===
Defense
4–3

FS
Ja'Qurious Conley
Mordecai McDaniel
Treyveon McGee

WLB	MLB	SLB
Ositadinma Ekwonu	Prince Wallace-Bemah	Reid Williford
⋅	Cam Burden	Jonathon Okate
⋅	⋅	⋅

SS
Al-Ma'hi Ali
Maguire Neal
⋅

CB
Dontae Balfour
Trevon Booker
⋅

DE	DT	DT	DE
Stone Handy	Dez Morgan	⋅	Dre Butler
Mike Kelly-Lawson	Colin Coates	⋅	Dre Martin
⋅	⋅	⋅	⋅

CB
Elijah Culp
Derrick Edwards
⋅

Offense
Pro-style

WR
Isaiah Myers
O'Mega Blake
⋅

WR
Jairus Mack
Justin Olson
⋅

LT	LG	C	RG	RT
Jordan Herman	Jordan Spasojevic-Moko	Jonny King	Mitchell Mayes	Kendall Stanley
Dominick Kelley	Andrew Adair	Isaiah Bullerdick	Boston Brinkley	Tyler Gibson
⋅	⋅	⋅	⋅	⋅

TE
Jake Clemons
Bryce Kennon
⋅

WR
Sean Brown
Miles Burris
Terez Traynor

QB
Max Brown
Trexler Ivey
Deshawn Purdie

Special teams
PK Kyle Cunanan
PK Stephen Rusnak
P Michael O'Shaughnessy
P Bronson Long
KR Henry Rutledge
PR Henry Rutledge
LS Adam Booker
H Michael O'Shaughnessy

RB
Cartevious Norton
Terron Kellman
Hahsaun Wilson

== Awards and honors ==
=== Preseason ===
Awards Watch List	Player	Position	Year
Jim Thorpe Award	Dontae Balfour	DB	JR

=== In Season ===
Award	Player	Position	Year	Game
AAC Special Teams Player of the Week	Michael O'Shaughnessy	P	GR	GWU
AAC Offensive Player of the Week	O'Mega Blake	WR	JR	FAU
AAC Special Teams Player of the Week	Stephen Rusnak	K	JR	FAU
AAC Special Teams Player of the Week	Michael O'Shaughnessy	P	GR	UAB

=== Postseason ===
Conference Award	Player	Position	Year
AAC All-Conference Second Team	O'Mega Blake	WR	RJR
AAC All-Conference Third Team	Demon Clowney	DL	RJR
AAC All-Conference Third Team	Stephen Rusnak	PK	RJR

All Conference Honorable Mentions:

Offense: OL – Kendall Stanley, R-So.

Defense: DB – Dontae Balfour, Jr.

== Schedule ==
Date	Time	Opponent	Site	TV	Result	Attendance
August 31	8:00 p.m.	James Madison*	Jerry Richardson Stadium; Charlotte, NC	ESPNU	L 7–30	15,614
September 7	3:30 p.m.	at North Carolina*	Kenan Stadium; Chapel Hill, NC	ACCN	L 20–38	48,431
September 14	6:00 p.m.	Gardner–Webb*	Jerry Richardson Stadium; Charlotte, NC	ESPN+	W 27–26	16,715
September 21	12:00 p.m.	at Indiana*	Memorial Stadium; Bloomington, IN	BTN	L 14–52	43,109
September 28	7:00 p.m.	at Rice	Rice Stadium; Houston, TX	ESPN+	W 21–20	17,455
October 5	3:30 p.m.	East Carolina	Jerry Richardson Stadium; Charlotte, NC	ESPNU	W 55–24	17,102
October 19	3:30 p.m.	at No. 25 Navy	Navy–Marine Corps Memorial Stadium; Annapolis, MD	CBSSN	L 17–51	35,094
October 26	12:00 p.m.	at Memphis	Liberty Bowl Stadium; Memphis, TN	ESPNU	L 28–33	25,478
October 31	7:30 p.m.	Tulane	Jerry Richardson Stadium; Charlotte, NC	ESPN	L 3–34	12,268
November 16	3:30 p.m.	South Florida^{†}	Jerry Richardson Stadium; Charlotte, NC	ESPN+	L 24–59	15,030
November 23	3:00 p.m.	at Florida Atlantic	FAU Stadium; Boca Raton, FL	ESPN+	W 39–27	15,066
November 30	3:30 p.m.	UAB	Jerry Richardson Stadium; Charlotte, NC	ESPN+	W 29–27	8,091
*Non-conference game; ^{†}Homecoming; Rankings from AP Poll and CFP Rankings; All times are in Eastern time

== Television ==
Charlotte 49ers home games and conference road games are broadcast through the American Athletics Conference's television partners ESPN, and ABC Sports.

== Radio ==
Radio coverage for all games are broadcast by IMG College through the Charlotte 49ers Radio Network flagship station WZGV ESPN Radio 730 AM The Game, and the TuneIn Charlotte 49ers IMG Sports Network app. The radio announcers are "Voice of the 49ers" Matt Swierad with play-by-play alongside NFL veteran Al Wallace providing color commentary and Bobby Rosinski providing sideline reports.

== Preseason poll ==
The American Athletic Conference preseason media poll was released at AAC Media Day on July 23, 2024.

- First place votes in ()

Media poll
Predicted finish	Team	Votes (1st place)
1	Memphis	409 (23)
2	UTSA	368 (4)
3	Tulane	362 (2)
4	South Florida	339
5	Army	236 (1)
6	Florida Atlantic	228
7	East Carolina	219
	Rice	219
9	North Texas	216
10	UAB	192
11	Navy	150
12	Tulsa	95
13	Charlotte	77
14	Temple	40

== Game summaries ==
=== James Madison ===
James Madison Dukes (0–0) at Charlotte 49ers (0–0) – Game summary

Quarter	1	2	3	4	Total
Dukes	3	6	7	14	30
49ers	0	7	0	0	7

at Jerry Richardson Stadium • Charlotte, North Carolina

- Date: August 31st
- Game time: 8:00 p.m. EDT
- Game weather: Cloudy • Temperature: 83 °F (28 °C) • Wind: 0 miles per hour (0 km/h)
- Game attendance: 15,614
- Referee: Charles Lamertina
- TV announcers (ESPNU): Justin Kutcher (play-by-play) and Charles Arbuckle (analyst)

Game information

First quarter

- (0:41) JMU – Noe Ruelas 43 yard field goal (Drive: 4 plays, 0 yards, 0:52; James Madison 3–0)

Second quarter

- (8:09) CLT – Isaiah Myers 26 yard pass from Max Brown, Kyle Cunanan kick (Drive: 6 plays, 64 yards, 3:05; Charlotte 7–3)
- (0:49) JMU – George Pettaway 33 yard pass from Alonza Barnett III, kick failed (Drive: 1 play, 33 yards, 0:05; James Madison 9–7)

Third quarter

- (14:16) JMU – Omarion Dollison 73 yard pass from Alonza Barnett III, Noe Ruelas kick (Drive: 2 plays, 75 yards, 0:44; James Madison 16–7)

Fourth quarter

- (14:15) JMU – Ayo Adeyi 8 yard run, Noe Ruelas kick (Drive: 7 plays, 63 yards, 3:12; James Madison 23–7)
- (1:10) JMU – George Pettaway 1 yard run, Noe Ruelas kick (Drive: 7 plays, 52 yards, 3:25; James Madison 30–7)

Statistics	JMU	CLT
First downs	16	17
Plays–yards	60–417	76–324
Rushes–yards	42–198	31–131
Passing yards	219	193
Passing: Comp–Att–Int	10–18–1	22–45–2
Time of possession	28:18	31:42

Team	Category	Player	Statistics
James Madison	Passing	Alonza Barnett III	10/18, 219 yards, 2 TD, 1 INT
James Madison	Rushing	Alonza Barnett III	9 carries, 89 yards
James Madison	Receiving	Omarion Dollison	2 receptions, 80 yards, 1 TD
Charlotte	Passing	Max Brown	22/45, 193 yards, 1 TD, 2 INT
Charlotte	Rushing	Terron Kellman	9 carries, 76 yards
Charlotte	Receiving	Sean Brown	6 receptions, 70 yards

=== at North Carolina ===
Charlotte 49ers (0–1) at North Carolina Tar Heels (1–0) – Game summary

Quarter	1	2	3	4	Total
49ers	3	3	7	7	20
Tar Heels	14	7	10	7	38

at Kenan Memorial Stadium • Chapel Hill, North Carolina

- Date: September 7th
- Game time: 3:30 p.m. EDT
- Game weather: Sunny • Temperature: 81 °F (27 °C) • Wind: NW at 3 miles per hour (4.8 km/h)
- Game attendance: 48,431
- Referee: Kevin Randall
- TV announcers (ACCN): Jorge Sedano (play-by-play), Orlando Franklin (analyst), and Morgan Uber (sideline reporter)

Game information

First quarter

- (8:43) UNC – Bryson Nesbit 30 yard pass from Conner Harrell, Noah Burnette kick (Drive: 9 plays, 94 yards, 3:11; North Carolina 7–0)
- (4:43) CLT – Kyle Cunanan 25 yard field goal (Drive: 10 plays, 67 yards, 4:00; North Carolina 7–3)
- (3:16) UNC – Nate McCollum 37 yard run, Noah Burnette kick (Drive: 5 plays, 75 yards, 1:27; North Carolina 14–3)

Second quarter

- (12:29) CLT – Kyle Cunanan 20 yard field goal (Drive: 9 plays, 72 yards, 5:47; North Carolina 14–6)
- (6:00) UNC – Conner Harrell 4 yard run, Noah Burnette kick (Drive: 13 plays, 75 yards, 6:29; North Carolina 21–6)

Third quarter

- (11:46) CLT – Bryce Kennon 5 yard pass from Deshawn Purdie, Kyle Cunanan kick (Drive: 8 plays, 75 yards, 3:14; North Carolina 21–13)
- (10:54) UNC – Christian Hamilton 58 yard pass from Conner Harrell, Noah Burnette kick (Drive: 2 plays, 74 yards, 0:46; North Carolina 28–13)
- (4:09) UNC – Noah Burnette 44 yard field goal (Drive: 8 plays, 53 yards, 3:45; North Carolina 31–13)

Fourth quarter

- (6:39) UNC – Davion Gause 1 yard run, Liam Boyd kick (Drive: 11 plays, 85 yards, 5:57; North Carolina 38–13)
- (4:51) CLT – Henry Rutledge 28 yard pass from Deshawn Purdie, Kyle Cunanan kick (Drive: 5 plays, 75 yards, 1:48; North Carolina 38–20)

Statistics	CLT	UNC
First downs	13	28
Plays–yards	56–358	71–490
Rushes–yards	25–49	45–269
Passing yards	309	221
Passing: Comp–Att–Int	17–31–0	17–26–1
Time of possession	26:36	33:24

Team	Category	Player	Statistics
Charlotte	Passing	Max Brown	8/12, 175 yards
Charlotte	Rushing	Hahsaun Wilson	8 carries, 29 yards
Charlotte	Receiving	Jairus Mack	5 receptions, 118 yards
North Carolina	Passing	Conner Harrell	16/25, 219 yards, 2 TD, 1 INT
North Carolina	Rushing	Davion Gause	16 carries, 105 yards, 1 TD
North Carolina	Receiving	Christian Hamilton	1 reception, 58 yards, 1 TD

=== Gardner–Webb (FCS) ===
Gardner–Webb Runnin' Bulldogs (FCS) (0–2) at Charlotte 49ers (0–2) – Game summary

Quarter	1	2	3	4	Total
Runnin' Bulldogs (FCS)	3	14	3	6	26
49ers	0	3	3	21	27

at Jerry Richardson Stadium • Charlotte, North Carolina

- Date: September 14th
- Game time: 6:00 p.m. EDT
- Game weather: Sunny • Temperature: 82 °F (28 °C) • Wind: E at 14 miles per hour (23 km/h)
- Game attendance: 16,715
- Referee: Reid Jackson
- TV announcers (ESPN+): James Westling (play-by-play) and Reggie Walker (analyst)

Game information

First quarter

- (6:47) GWEB – Jay Billingsley 30 yard field goal (Drive: 11 plays, 69 yards, 6:07; Gardner–Webb 3–0)

Second quarter

- (8:04) GWEB – Trevor Moffitt 45 yard interception return, Jay Billingsley kick (Gardner–Webb 10–0)
- (0:35) GWEB – Anthony Lowe 30 yard pass from Tyler Ridell, Jay Billingsley kick (Drive: 12 plays, 99 yards, 5:09; Gardner–Webb 17–0)
- (0:00) CLT – Stephen Rusnak 54 yard field goal (Drive: 5 plays, 28 yards, 0:29; Gardner–Webb 17–3)

Third quarter

- (9:02) GWEB – Jay Billingsley 44 yard field goal (Drive: 12 plays, 48 yards, 5:58; Gardner–Webb 20–3)
- (1:23) CLT – Stephen Rusnak 25 yard field goal (Drive: 6 plays, 35 yards, 3:10; Gardner–Webb 20–6)

Fourth quarter

- (9:09) CLT – O'Mega Blake 11 yard pass from Trexler Ivey, 2-point pass failed (Drive: 9 plays, 57 yards, 3:50; Gardner–Webb 20–12)
- (5:20) CLT – Sean Brown 28 yard pass from Trexler Ivey, 2-point pass (Drive: 6 plays, 75 yards, 2:19; Tied 20–20)
- (4:55) CLT – Hahsaun Wilson 39 yard run, Stephen Rusnak kick (Drive: 1 play, 39 yards, 0:09; Charlotte 27–20)
- (1:55) GWEB – Carson Gresock 1 yard run, 2-point pass failed (Drive: 9 plays, 75 yards, 3:00; Charlotte 27–26)

Statistics	GWEB	CLT
First downs	18	20
Plays–yards	67–390	61–349
Rushes–yards	29–50	26–13
Passing yards	340	336
Passing: Comp–Att–Int	23–38–2	27–35–1
Time of possession	32:30	27:30

Team	Category	Player	Statistics
Gardner–Webb	Passing	Tyler Ridell	23/37, 340 yards, 1 TD, 2 INT
Gardner–Webb	Rushing	Edward Saydee	11 carries, 42 yards
Gardner–Webb	Receiving	Anthony Lowe	7 receptions, 122 yards, 1 TD
Charlotte	Passing	Deshawn Purdie	16/23, 194 yards, 1 INT
Charlotte	Rushing	Hahsaun Wilson	6 carries, 52 yards, 1 TD
Charlotte	Receiving	Bryce Kennon	5 receptions, 70 yards

=== at Indiana ===
Charlotte 49ers (1–2) at Indiana Hoosiers (3–0) – Game summary

Quarter	1	2	3	4	Total
49ers	0	14	0	0	14
Hoosiers	10	21	14	7	52

at Memorial Stadium • Bloomington, Indiana

- Date: September 21st
- Game time: 12:00 p.m. EDT
- Game weather: Sunny • Temperature: 80 °F (27 °C) • Wind: E at 4 miles per hour (6.4 km/h)
- Game attendance: 43,109
- Referee: Larry Smith
- TV announcers (BTN): Guy Haberman (play-by-play), Yogi Roth (analyst), and Rhett Lewis (sideline reporter)

Game information

First quarter

- (10:12) IND – Ty Son Lawton 8-yard run, Nicolas Radicic kick (Drive: 6 plays, 49 yards, 3:11; Indiana 7–0)
- (4:08) IND – Nicolas Radicic 27-yard field goal (Drive: 9 plays, 47 yards, 3:41; Indiana 10–0)

Second quarter

- (13:47) CLT – C. J. Stokes 13-yard run, Stephen Rusnak kick (Drive: 10 plays, 75 yards, 5:21; Indiana 10–7)
- (9:50) IND – Justice Ellison 2-yard run, Nicolas Radicic kick (Drive: 8 plays, 75 yards, 3:57; Indiana 17–7)
- (5:19) CLT – Isaiah Myers 25-yard pass from Trexler Ivey, Stephen Rusnak kick (Drive: 9 plays, 75 yards, 4:31; Indiana 17–14)
- (3:05) IND – Kurtis Rourke 12-yard run, Nicolas Radicic kick (Drive: 5 plays, 75 yards, 2:14; Indiana 24–14)
- (0:26) IND – Ke'Shawn Williams 19-yard pass from Kurtis Rourke, Nicolas Radicic kick (Drive: 7 plays, 50 yards, 1:30; Indiana 31–14)

Third quarter

- (12:13) IND – Ty Son Lawton 5-yard run, Nicolas Radicic kick (Drive: 5 plays, 75 yards, 2:47; Indiana 38–14)
- (3:42) IND – Kaelon Black 21-yard run, Nicolas Radicic kick (Drive: 7 plays, 70 yards, 3:17; Indiana 45–14)

Fourth quarter

- (9:36) IND – Elijah Green 13-yard run, Nicolas Radicic kick (Drive: 8 plays, 52 yards, 2:56; Indiana 52–14)

Statistics	CLT	IU
First downs	13	29
Plays–yards	56–256	68–510
Rushes–yards	33–137	41–222
Passing yards	119	288
Passing: Comp–Att–Int	14–23–0	18–27–0
Time of possession	29:41	30:19

Team	Category	Player	Statistics
Charlotte	Passing	Trexler Ivey	14/23, 119 yards, TD
Charlotte	Rushing	Cartevious Norton	11 carries, 58 yards
Charlotte	Receiving	Jarius Mack	3 receptions, 36 yards
Indiana	Passing	Kurtis Rourke	16/20, 258 yards, TD
Indiana	Rushing	Justice Ellison	9 carries, 58 yards, TD
Indiana	Receiving	Myles Price	3 receptions, 77 yards

=== at Rice ===
Charlotte 49ers (1–3) at Rice Owls (1–3) – Game summary

Quarter	1	2	3	4	Total
49ers	0	0	14	7	21
Owls	0	10	0	10	20

at Rice Stadium • Houston, Texas

- Date: September 28th
- Game time: 7:00 p.m. EDT
- Game weather: Sunny • Temperature: 90 °F (32 °C) • Wind: NW at 7 miles per hour (11 km/h)
- Game attendance: 17,455
- Referee: Darryl DeBerry
- TV announcers (ESPN+): Ted Emrich (play-by-play) and Charlie Strong (analyst)

Game information

First quarter

No scoring plays

Second quarter

- (12:04) RICE – Quinton Jackson 13-yard pass from E. J. Warner, Enock Gota kick (Drive: 8 plays, 80 yards, 3:27; Rice 7–0)
- (1:38) RICE – Enock Gota 32-yard field goal (Drive: 10 plays, 24 yards, 3:38; Rice 10–0)

Third quarter

- (10:52) CLT – O'Mega Blake 32-yard pass from Deshawn Purdie, Stephen Rusnak kick (Drive: 5 plays, 66 yards, 2:09; Rice 10–7)
- (2:38) CLT – O'Mega Blake 45-yard pass from Deshawn Purdie, Stephen Rusnak kick (Drive: 10 plays, 84 yards, 5:16; Charlotte 14–10)

Fourth quarter

- (14:46) RICE – Elijah Mojarro 41-yard pass from E. J. Warner, Enock Gota kick (Drive: 7 plays, 75 yards, 2:52; Rice 17–14)
- (6:42) RICE – Enock Gota 25-yard field goal (Drive: 13 plays, 48 yards, 5:24; Rice 20–14)
- (0:47) CLT – Hahsaun Wilson 1-yard run, Stephen Rusnak kick (Drive: 7 plays, 77 yards, 0:58; Charlotte 21–20)

Statistics	CLT	RICE
First downs	17	23
Plays–yards	65–304	71–463
Rushes–yards	29–67	31–209
Passing yards	237	254
Passing: Comp–Att–Int	18–36–1	22–40–0
Time of possession	29:59	30:01

Team	Category	Player	Statistics
Charlotte	Passing	Deshawn Purdie	10/15, 183 yards, 2 TD
Charlotte	Rushing	Cartevious Norton	10 carries, 56 yards
Charlotte	Receiving	O'Mega Blake	5 receptions, 153 yards, 2 TD
Rice	Passing	E. J. Warner	22/40, 254 yards, 2 TD
Rice	Rushing	Dean Connors	14 carries, 121 yards
Rice	Receiving	Matt Sykes	8 receptions, 84 yards

=== East Carolina ===
East Carolina Pirates (3–2) at Charlotte 49ers (2–3) – Game summary

Quarter	1	2	3	4	Total
Pirates	3	7	7	7	24
49ers	14	17	3	21	55

at Jerry Richardson Stadium • Charlotte, North Carolina

- Date: October 5th
- Game time: 3:35 p.m. EDT
- Game weather: Sunny • Temperature: 84 °F (29 °C) • Wind: S at 8 miles per hour (13 km/h)
- Game attendance: 17,102
- Referee: Steven Anderson
- TV announcers (ESPNU): Matt Schumacker (play-by-play) and Dustin Fox (analyst)

Game information

First quarter

- (10:18) - CLT - Cartevious Norton 11-yard run, Stephen Rusnak kick (Drive: 8 plays, 55 yards, 4:34; CLT 7-0)
- (3:38) - CLT - Deshawn Purdie 1-yard run, Stephen Rusnak kick (Drive: 10 plays, 74 yards, 5:47; CLT 14-0)
- (00:45) - ECU - Noah Perez 38-yard field goal (Drive: 8 plays, 55 yards, 2:53; CLT 14-3)

Second quarter

- (12:24) - ECU - Tyler Savage 13-yard pass from Jake Garcia, Noah Perez kick (Drive: 3 plays, 74 yards, TOP 1:02; CLT 14-10)
- (8:40) - CLT - Stephen Rusnak 35-yard field goal (Drive: 8 plays, 35 yards, TOP 3:37; CLT 17-10)
- (3:24) - CLT - Hahsaun Wilson 1-yard run, Stephen Rusnak kick (Drive: 8 plays, 68 yards, 4:24; CLT 24-10)
- (1:40) - CLT - Cartevious Norton 62-yard run, Stephen Rusnak kick (Drive: 2 plays, 62 yards, 0:14; CLT 31-10)

Third quarter

- (12:26) - ECU - London Montgomery 48-yard run, Noah Perez kick (Drive: 7 plays, 78 yards, 2:29; CLT 31-17)
- (4:00) - CLT - Stephen Rusnak 28-yard field goal (Drive: 11 plays, 60 yards, 05:30; CLT 34-14)

Fourth quarter

- (14:53) - CLT - Hahsaun Wilson 23-yard run, Stephen Rusnak kick (Drive: 5 plays, 76 yards, 2:26; CLT 41-17)
- (12:00) - CLT - Hahsaun Wilson 65-yard run, Stephen Rusnak kick (Drive: 3 plays, 79 yards, 1:31; CLT 48-17)
- (10:31) - CLT - Stone Handy 53-yard interception, Stephen Rusnak kick (Drive: 1 play, 53 yards, 1:29; CLT 55-17)
- (10:17) - ECU - Winston Wright Jr. 94-yard kickoff return, Noah Perez kick (Drive: 1 play, 94 yards, 0:00; CLT 55-24)

Statistics	ECU	CLT
First downs	18	26
Plays–yards	62–343	74–517
Rushes–yards	25–148	52–311
Passing yards	195	206
Passing: Comp–Att–Int	17–37–2	13–22–0
Time of possession	19:06	40:54

Team	Category	Player	Statistics
East Carolina	Passing	Jake Garcia	6/8, 111 yards, TD, INT
East Carolina	Rushing	London Montgomery	3 carries, 56 yards, TD
East Carolina	Receiving	Chase Sowell	4 receptions, 82 yards
Charlotte	Passing	Deshawn Purdie	13/22, 206 yards
Charlotte	Rushing	Hahsaun Wilson	15 carries, 164 yards, 3 TD
Charlotte	Receiving	Jairus Mack	3 receptions, 81 yards

=== at No. 25 Navy ===
Charlotte 49ers (3–3) at No. 25 Navy Midshipmen (5–0) – Game summary

Quarter	1	2	3	4	Total
49ers	0	10	7	0	17
No. 25 Midshipmen	24	14	13	0	51

at Navy–Marine Corps Memorial Stadium • Annapolis, Maryland

- Date: October 19th
- Game time: 3:30 p.m. EDT
- Game weather: Sunny • Temperature: 66 °F (19 °C) • Wind: SW 4 miles per hour (6.4 km/h)
- Game attendance: 35,094
- Referee: Edwin Lee
- TV announcers (CBSSN): Carter Blackburn (play-by-play), Adam Breneman (analyst), and Sheehan Stanwick-Burch (sideline reporter)

Game information

First quarter

- (13:07) NAVY – Alex Tecza 46-yard pass from Blake Horvath, Nathan Kirkwood kick (Drive: 4 plays, 73 yards, 1:44; Navy 7–0)
- (7:17) NAVY – Alex Tecza 12-yard run, Nathan Kirkwood kick (Drive: 5 plays, 50 yards, 2:46; Navy 14–0)
- (6:20) NAVY – Alex Tecza 2-yard run, Nathan Kirkwood kick (Drive: 3 plays, 17 yards, 0:48; Navy 21–0)
- (3:02) NAVY – Nathan Kirkwood 22-yard field goal (Drive: 7 plays, 41 yards, 3:01; Navy 24–0)

Second quarter

- (13:21) NAVY – Cody Howard 11-yard pass from Blake Horvath, Nathan Kirkwood kick (Drive: 6 plays, 38 yards, 3:16; Navy 31–0)
- (10:24) NAVY – Deshaun Peele 61-yard interception return, Nathan Kirkwood kick (Drive: 2 plays, 26 yards, 2:49; Navy 38–0)
- (8:49) CHAR – Stephen Rusnak 39-yard field goal (Drive: 4 plays, -6 yards, 3:57; Navy 38–3)
- (3:09) CHAR – O'Mega Blake 20-yard pass from Max Brown, Stephen Rusnak kick (Drive: 8 plays, 84 yards, 3:57; Navy 38–10)

Third quarter

- (4:49) NAVY – Brandon Chatman 19-yard pass from Blake Horvath, Nathan Kirkwood PAT failed (Drive: 4 plays, 40 yards, 2:03; Navy 44–10)
- (2:55) CHAR – Duane Thomas Jr. 13-yard pass from Max Brown, Stephen Rusnak kick (Drive: 4 plays, 82 yards, 1:47; Navy 44–17)
- (1:31) NAVY – Deshaun Peele 84-yard interception return, Nathan Kirkwood kick (Drive: 1 play, 0 yards, 0:20; Navy 51–17)

Fourth quarter

No scoring plays

Statistics	CLT	NAVY
First downs	22	18
Plays–yards	70–350	55–288
Rushes–yards	48–187	42–171
Passing yards	163	117
Passing: Comp–Att–Int	8–22–4	7–13–0
Time of possession	32:15	27:45

Team	Category	Player	Statistics
Charlotte	Passing	Max Brown	7/18, 152 yards, 2 TD, 3 INT
Charlotte	Rushing	Catervious Norton	16 carries, 59 yards
Charlotte	Receiving	Miles Burris	1 reception, 48 yards
Navy	Passing	Blake Horvath	7/13, 117 yards, 3 TD
Navy	Rushing	Alex Tecza	8 carries, 68 yards, 2 TD
Navy	Receiving	Alex Tecza	1 reception, 46 yards, TD

=== at Memphis ===
Charlotte 49ers (3–4) at Memphis Tigers (6–1) – Game summary

Quarter	1	2	3	4	Total
49ers	7	0	0	21	28
Tigers	0	7	14	12	33

at Simmons Bank Liberty Stadium • Memphis, Tennessee

- Date: October 26th
- Game time: 12:00 p.m. EDT
- Game weather: Sunny • Temperature: 67 °F (19 °C) • Wind: NE 11 miles per hour (18 km/h)
- Game attendance: 25,478
- Referee: Reid Jackson
- TV announcers (ESPNU): Courtney Lyle (play-by-play) and Rene Ingoglia (analyst)

Game information

First quarter

- (9:02) CLT – Cartevious Norton 17-yard run, Stephen Rusnak kick (Drive: 8 plays, 67 yards, 4:46; Charlotte 7–0)

Second quarter

- (14:17) MEM – DeMeer Blankumsee 2-yard pass from Seth Henigan, Tristian Vandenberg kick (Drive: 10 plays, 53 yards, 5:33; Tied 7–7)

Third quarter

- (7:49) MEM – Makari Bodiford 14-yard run, Tristian Vandenberg kick (Drive: 11 plays, 94 yards, 5:09; Memphis 14–7)
- (2:23) MEM – Mario Anderson Jr. 11-yard run, Tristian Vandenberg kick (Drive: 9 plays, 52 yards, 4:33; Memphis 21–7)

Fourth quarter

- (14:07) CLT – O'Mega Blake 39-yard pass from Deshawn Purdie, Stephen Rusnak kick (Drive: 8 plays, 75 yards, 3:16; Memphis 21–14)
- (8:02) CLT – Cartevious Norton 5-yard run, Stephen Rusnak kick (Drive: 8 plays, 75 yards, 4:04; Tied 21–21)
- (1:56) MEM – Tristian Vandenberg 21-yard field goal (Drive: 4 plays, 5 yards, 1:08; Memphis 24–21)
- (1:20) CLT – Hahsaun Wilson 18-yard run, Stephen Rusnak kick (Drive: 2 plays, 75 yards, 0:36; Charlotte 28–24)
- (0:31) MEM – Roc Taylor 24-yard pass from Seth Henigan, Tristian Vandenberg kick (Drive: 7 plays, 75 yards, 0:49; Memphis 31–28)
- (0:19) MEM – 0-yard safety (Memphis 33–28)

Statistics	CLT	MEM
First downs	13	23
Plays–yards	52–303	80–424
Rushes–yards	30–113	48–212
Passing yards	190	212
Passing: Comp–Att–Int	9–22–2	20–32–1
Time of possession	23:20	36:40

Team	Category	Player	Statistics
Charlotte	Passing	Deshawn Purdie	5/14, 152 yards, TD, INT
Charlotte	Rushing	Cartevious Norton	17 carries, 86 yards, 2 TD
Charlotte	Receiving	O'Mega Blake	3 receptions, 128 yards, TD
Memphis	Passing	Seth Henigan	20/32, 212 yards, 2 TD, INT
Memphis	Rushing	Mario Anderson Jr.	32 carries, 141 yards, TD
Memphis	Receiving	Roc Taylor	6 receptions, 99 yards, TD

=== Tulane ===
Tulane Green Wave (6–2) at Charlotte 49ers (3–5) – Game summary

Quarter	1	2	3	4	Total
Green Wave	3	7	10	14	34
49ers	0	3	0	0	3

at Jerry Richardson Stadium • Charlotte, North Carolina

- Date: October 31st
- Game time: 7:30 p.m. EDT
- Game weather: Clear • Temperature: 70 °F (21 °C) • Wind: S 7 miles per hour (11 km/h)
- Game attendance: 12,268
- Referee: Steven Anderson
- TV announcers (ESPN): Matt Barrie (play-by-play), Dan Mullen (analyst) and Harry Lyles Jr. (sideline)

Game information

First quarter

- (2:00) TULN – Jacob Barnes 34-yard field goal (Drive: 20 plays, 80 yards, 10:58; Tulane 3–0)

Second quarter

- (1:45) TULN – Makhi Hughes 1-yard run, Jacob Barnes kick (Drive: 14 plays, 76 yards, 5:46; Tulane 10–0)
- (0:00) CLT – Stephen Rusnak 29-yard field goal (Drive: 6 plays, 43 yards, 1:38; Tulane 10–3)

Third quarter

- (9:36) TULN – Jacob Barnes 34-yard field goal (Drive: 10 plays, 59 yards, 5:24; Tulane 13–3)
- (8:27) TULN – Micah Robinson 21-yard interception (Tulane 20–3)

Fourth quarter

- (14:08) TULN – Makhi Hughes 1-yard run, Jacob Barnes kick (Drive: 13 plays, 68 yards, 7:19; Tulane 27–3)
- (2:22) TULN – Shaadie Clayton-Johnson 5-yard run, Jacob Barnes kick (Drive: 7 plays, 47 yards, 3:21; Tulane 34–3)

Statistics	TULN	CLT
First downs	29	12
Plays–yards	78–431	44–189
Rushes–yards	49–217	22–120
Passing yards	214	69
Passing: Comp–Att–Int	21–29–0	7–22–1
Time of possession	42:09	17:51

Team	Category	Player	Statistics
Tulane	Passing	Darian Mensah	21/29, 214 yards
Tulane	Rushing	Makhi Hughes	27 carries, 117 yards, 2 TD
Tulane	Receiving	Mario Williams	6 receptions, 96 yards
Charlotte	Passing	Deshawn Purdie	5/12, 66 yards, INT
Charlotte	Rushing	Hahsaun Wilson	6 carries, 68 yards
Charlotte	Receiving	O'Mega Blake	3 receptions, 52 yards

=== South Florida ===
South Florida Bulls (4–5) at Charlotte 49ers (3–6) – Game summary

Quarter	1	2	3	4	Total
Bulls	7	7	31	14	59
49ers	7	3	7	7	24

at Jerry Richardson Stadium • Charlotte, North Carolina

- Date: November 16th
- Game time: 3:30 p.m. EST
- Game weather: Sunny • Temperature: 66 °F (19 °C) • Wind: NW 2 miles per hour (3.2 km/h)
- Game attendance: 15,030
- Referee: Charles Lamertina
- TV announcers (ESPN+): Justin Kutcher (play-by-play), Reggie Walker (analyst) and Smacker Miles (sideline)

Game information

First quarter

- (5:18) CLT – Cartevious Norton 6-yard run, Stephen Rusnak kick (Drive: 12 plays, 73 yards, 5:47; Charlotte 7–0)
- (1:55) USF – Ta'Ron Keith 16-yard run, John Cannon kick (Drive: 8 plays, 75 yards, 3:24; Tied 7–7)

Second quarter

- (8:38) CLT – Stephen Rusnak 50-yard field goal (Drive: 10 plays, 40 yards, 4:39; Charlotte 10–7)
- (6:41) USF – Nay'Quan Wright 6-yard run, John Cannon kick (Drive: 6 plays, 75 yards, 1:58; South Florida 14–10)

Third quarter

- (12:57) USF – Kelley Joiner 54-yard run, John Cannon kick (Drive: 2 plays, 62 yards, 0:35; South Florida 21–10)
- (10:49) CLT – Cartevious Norton 2-yard run, Stephen Rusnak kick (Drive: 5 plays, 86 yards, 2:02; South Florida 21–17)
- (9:13) USF – Nay'Quan Wright 6-yard run, John Cannon kick (Drive: 5 plays, 70 yards, 1:36; South Florida 28–17)
- (4:26) USF – John Cannon 33-yard field goal (Drive: 5 plays, 17 yards, 2:39; South Florida 31–17)
- (3:38) USF – Brent Austin 14-yard interception, John Cannon kick (South Florida 38–17)
- (1:11) USF – Mac Harris 25-yard fumble recovery, John Cannon kick (South Florida 45–17)

Fourth quarter

- (13:43) CLT – Isaiah Myers 15-yard pass from Deshawn Purdie, Stephen Rusnak kick (Drive: 7 plays, 79 yards, 2:21; South Florida 45–24)
- (13:34) USF – Kelley Joiner 45-yard run, John Cannon kick (Drive: 1 play, 45 yards, 0:09; South Florida 52–24)
- (5:31) USF – Alvon Isaac 9-yard run, John Cannon kick (Drive: 4 plays, 66 yards, 2:08; South Florida 59–24)

Statistics	USF	CLT
First downs	26	22
Plays–yards	65–551	74–347
Rushes–yards	48–425	35–91
Passing yards	126	256
Passing: Comp–Att–Int	11–17–1	17–39–2
Time of possession	25:55	34:05

Team	Category	Player	Statistics
South Florida	Passing	Bryce Archie	11/16, 126 yards, INT
South Florida	Rushing	Kelley Joiner	9 carries, 140 yards, 2 TD
South Florida	Receiving	Nay'Quan Wright	2 receptions, 50 yards
Charlotte	Passing	Deshawn Purdie	17/39, 256 yards, TD, 2 INT
Charlotte	Rushing	Cartevious Norton	10 carries, 30 yards, 2 TD
Charlotte	Receiving	Isaiah Myers	4 receptions, 82 yards, TD

=== at Florida Atlantic ===
Charlotte 49ers (3–7) at Florida Atlantic Owls (2–8) – Game summary

Quarter	1	2	3	4	Total
49ers	10	6	10	13	39
Owls	3	7	10	7	27

at FAU Stadium • Boca Raton, Florida

- Date: November 23rd
- Game time: 3:00 p.m. EST
- Game weather: Sunny • Temperature: 69 °F (21 °C) • Wind: NW 10 miles per hour (16 km/h)
- Game attendance: 15,066
- Referee: Tim Rich
- TV announcers (ESPN+): Ryan Urquhart (play-by-play), Patrick Murray (analyst) and Natalie Kalibat (sideline)

Game information

First quarter

- (10:36) FAU – Morgan Suarez 20-yard field goal (Drive: 9 plays, 72 yards, 4:24; Florida Atlantic 3–0)
- (8:38) CHA – O'Mega Blake 54-yard pass from Deshawn Purdie, Stephen Rusnak kick (Drive: 4 plays, 75 yards, 1:58; Charlotte 7–3)
- (6:52) CHA – Stephen Rusnak 50-yard field goal (Drive: 4 plays, 3 yards, 0:55; Charlotte 10–3)

Second quarter

- (8:59) CHA – Stephen Rusnak 45-yard field goal (Drive: 7 plays, 66 yards, 3:39; Charlotte 13–3)
- (4:59) FAU – Xavier Terrell 21-yard run, Morgan Suarez kick (Drive: 9 plays, 68 yards, 3:54; Charlotte 13–10)
- (0:34) CHA – Stephen Rusnak 20-yard field goal (Drive: 11 plays, 72 yards, 4:25; Charlotte 16–10)

Third quarter

- (10:11) CHA – Stephen Rusnak 40-yard field goal (Drive: 9 plays, 52 yards, 4:49; Charlotte 19–10)
- (1:59) FAU – Morgan Suarez 24-yard field goal (Drive: 13 plays, 69 yards, 8:12; Charlotte 19–13)
- (1:47) CHA – O'Mega Blake 75-yard pass from Deshawn Purdie, Stephen Rusnak kick (Drive: 1 play, 75 yards, 0:12; Charlotte 26–13)
- (0:49) FAU – Omari Hayes 65-yard pass from Tyriq Starks, Morgan Suarez kick (Drive: 3 plays, 75 yards, 0:58; Charlotte 26–20)

Fourth quarter

- (11:36) FAU – CJ Campbell Jr. 58-yard run, Morgan Suarez kick (Drive: 7 plays, 93 yards, 3:08; Florida Atlantic 27–26)
- (5:25) CHA – O'Mega Blake 47-yard pass from Deshawn Purdie (Drive: 6 plays, 81 yards, 2:15; Charlotte 32–27)
- (2:05) CHA – Katron Evans 22-yard fumble recovery, Stephen Rusnak kick (Charlotte 39–27)

Statistics	CLT	FAU
First downs	13	22
Plays–yards	54–442	73–458
Rushes–yards	24–46	50–279
Passing yards	396	179
Passing: Comp–Att–Int	16–30–1	12–23–0
Time of possession	23:59	36:01

Team	Category	Player	Statistics
Charlotte	Passing	Deshawn Purdie	16/30, 396 yards, 3 TD, INT
Charlotte	Rushing	Cartevious Norton	14 carries, 38 yards
Charlotte	Receiving	O'Mega Blake	5 receptions, 205 yards, 3 TD
Florida Atlantic	Passing	Tyriq Starks	12/23, 179 yards, TD
Florida Atlantic	Rushing	CJ Campbell Jr.	21 carries, 150 yards, TD
Florida Atlantic	Receiving	Omari Hayes	1 reception, 65 yards, TD

=== UAB ===
UAB Blazers (3–8) at Charlotte 49ers (4–7) – Game summary

Quarter	1	2	3	4	Total
Blazers	0	14	0	13	27
49ers	7	6	6	10	29

at Jerry Richardson Stadium • Charlotte, North Carolina

- Date: November 30th
- Game time: 3:32 p.m. EST
- Game weather: Clear • Temperature: 46 °F (8 °C) • Wind: W 6 miles per hour (9.7 km/h)
- Game attendance: 8,091
- Referee: Steven Anderson
- TV announcers (ESPN+): Noah Frary (play-by-play), Reggie Walker (analyst) and Savanna Collins (sideline)

Game information

First quarter

- (5:12) CLT – Hahsaun Wilson 7-yard run, Kyle Cunanan kick (Drive: 7 plays, 59 yards, 2:33; Charlotte 7-0)

Second quarter

- (12:08) UAB – Kam Shanks 12-yard pass from Jalen Kitna, Jonah Delange kick (Drive: 7 plays, 60 yards, 2:56; Tied 7-7)
- (1:56) CLT – Kyle Cunanan 21-yard field goal (Drive: 9 plays, 85 yards, TOP 04:40; Charlotte 10-7)
- (0:20) UAB – Corri Milliner 26-yard pass from Jalen Kitna, Jonah Delange kick (Drive: 8 plays, 71 yards, 1:28; UAB 14-10)
- (0:00) CLT – Kyle Cunanan 30-yard field goal (Drive: 4 plays, 62 yards, 0:20; UAB 14-13)

Third quarter

- (4:29) CLT – Cartevious Norton 1-yard run (Drive: 7 plays, 80 yards, 3:12; Charlotte 19-14)

Fourth quarter

- (14:20) UAB – Lee Beebe Jr. 11-yard pass from Jalen Kitna (Drive: 10 plays, 65 yards, 5:09; UAB 20-19)
- (9:29) CLT – Kyle Cunanan 31-yard field goal (Drive: 9 plays, 61 yards, 4:51; Charlotte 22-20)
- (5:12) CLT – O'Mega Blake 46-yard pass from Deshawn Purdie, Kyle Cunanan kick (Drive: 4 plays, 57 yards, 1:35; Charlotte 29-20)
- (2:57) UAB – Lee Beebe Jr. 1-yard run, Jonah Delange kick (Drive: 5 plays, 70 yards, 2:10; Charlotte 29-27)

Statistics	UAB	CLT
First downs	27	19
Plays–yards	63–437	44–355
Rushes–yards	35–128	35–140
Passing yards	309	215
Passing: Comp–Att–Int	28–42–1	9–26–0
Time of possession	34:17	25:43

Team	Category	Player	Statistics
UAB	Passing	Jalen Kitna	26/40, 280 yards, 3 TD, INT
UAB	Rushing	Lee Beebe Jr.	19 carries, 82 yards, TD
UAB	Receiving	Corri Milliner	7 receptions, 126 yards, TD
Charlotte	Passing	Deshawn Purdie	9-26, 215 yards, TD
Charlotte	Rushing	Hahsaun Wilson	14 carries, 84 yards, TD
Charlotte	Receiving	Sean Brown	5 receptions, 100 yards

== Attendance ==
Season	Games	Sellouts	W–L (%)	Attendance	Average	Best
2024	6	3	3–3 (.500)	84,820	14,137	17,102
