= Max Brown (American football) =

American football player (born 2003)

No. 6 – West Virginia Mountaineers
- Position: Quarterback
- Class: (redshirt) Senior

Personal information
- Born: May 7, 2003 (age 23)
- Listed height: 6 ft 2 in (1.88 m)
- Listed weight: 221 lb (100 kg)

Career information
- High school: Lincoln Christian (Tulsa, Oklahoma)
- College: Florida (2022–2023); Charlotte (2024); West Virginia (2025–present)
- Stats at ESPN

Max Brown (born May 7, 2003) is an American college football quarterback for the West Virginia Mountaineers. He previously played for the Florida Gators and the Charlotte 49ers.

== Early life ==
Brown attended Lincoln Christian School in Tulsa, Oklahoma. During his high school career, he had 4,416 passing-yards and 68 touchdowns. As a senior, he was the Oklahoma District 3-3A MVP. Brown committed to the University of Florida to play college football.

== College career ==
=== Florida ===
Brown redshirted his first year at Florida in 2022. He entered 2023 as the backup to Graham Mertz. After Mertz suffered an injury, Brown started his first career game against Florida State. He entered the transfer portal on December 4, 2023.

=== Charlotte ===
On December 11, 2023, Brown announced that he would be transferring to the University of North Carolina at Charlotte.

On November 29, 2024, Brown announced that he would enter the transfer portal for the second time.

=== West Virginia ===
On January 23, 2025, Brown announced that he would transfer to West Virginia University.

=== Statistics ===
| Year | Team | Games | | | Passing | | | | | | | | Rushing | | | |
| Year | Team | GP | GS | Record | Comp | Att | Pct | Yards | Avg | TD | Int | Rate | Att | Yards | Avg | TD |
|---|---|---|---|---|---|---|---|---|---|---|---|---|---|---|---|---|
| 2022 | Florida | Redshirt | | | | | | | | | | | | | | |
| 2023 | Florida | 6 | 1 | 0−1 | 19 | 28 | 67.9 | 192 | 6.9 | 0 | 1 | 118.3 | 23 | 37 | 1.6 | 0 |
| 2024 | Charlotte | 5 | 4 | 0−4 | 43 | 93 | 46.2 | 561 | 6.0 | 3 | 6 | 94.6 | 33 | 72 | 2.2 | 0 |
| Career | | 11 | 5 | 0−5 | 62 | 121 | 51.2 | 753 | 6.2 | 3 | 7 | 100.1 | 56 | 109 | 1.9 | 0 |
