= O'Mega Blake =

American football player (born 2002)

No. 9
- Position: Wide receiver

Personal information
- Born: July 9, 2002 (age 24)
- Listed height: 6 ft 3 in (1.91 m)
- Listed weight: 220 lb (100 kg)

Career information
- High school: South Pointe (Rock Hill, South Carolina)
- College: South Carolina (2021–2023); Charlotte (2024); Arkansas (2025)

Awards and highlights
- Second-team All-AAC (2024)
- Stats at ESPN

O'Mega T. Blake Sr. (born July 9, 2002) is an American former college football wide receiver. He played for the South Carolina Gamecocks, the Charlotte 49ers, and the Arkansas Razorbacks.

== Early life ==
Blake attended South Pointe High School in Rock Hill, South Carolina, where he played wide receiver, quarterback and cornerback. As a senior, he passed 381 yards, ran for 182 and had 709 yards on 50 receptions. Blake committed to the University of South Carolina to play college football.

== College career ==
In his first two years at South Carolina, Blake played in four games and had one reception for one yard. As a redshirt sophomore in 2023, he played in 12 games with four starts and had 19 receptions for 250 yards and two touchdowns. After the season, he transferred to the University of North Carolina at Charlotte. In his lone season at Charlotte in 2024, Blake started nine of 12 games, recording 32 receptions for a team-leading 795 yards and nine touchdowns. After the season he transferred to the University of Arkansas. He opened the season as a starter.

=== Statistics ===
Year	Team	GP	Receiving			
Year	Team	GP	Rec	Yds	Avg	TD
2021	South Carolina	1	0	0	–	0
2022	South Carolina	3	1	1	1.0	0
2023	South Carolina	12	19	250	13.2	2
2024	Charlotte	12	32	795	24.8	9
2025	Arkansas	12	58	769	13.3	5
Career		40	110	1,815	16.5	16
