= 2024 Rice Owls football team =

American college football season

2024 Rice Owls football
- Conference: American Athletic Conference
- Record: 4–8 (3–5 AAC)
- Head coach: Mike Bloomgren (7th season; first 8 games); Pete Alamar (interim; final 4 games)
- Offensive coordinator: Marques Tuiasosopo (4th season)
- Offensive scheme: Pro-style
- Defensive coordinator: Brian Smith (7th season)
- Base defense: Multiple 3–4
- Home stadium: Rice Stadium

2024 American Athletic Conference football standings
| | Conf. | | | Overall |
| Team | W | | L | W | | L |
|---|---|---|---|---|---|---|
| No. 21 Army y$ | 8 | – | 0 | 12 | – | 2 |
| Tulane y | 7 | – | 1 | 9 | – | 5 |
| Navy | 6 | – | 2 | 10 | – | 3 |
| No. 24 Memphis | 6 | – | 2 | 11 | – | 2 |
| East Carolina | 5 | – | 3 | 8 | – | 5 |
| South Florida | 4 | – | 4 | 7 | – | 6 |
| UTSA | 4 | – | 4 | 7 | – | 6 |
| Charlotte | 4 | – | 4 | 5 | – | 7 |
| North Texas | 3 | – | 5 | 6 | – | 7 |
| Rice | 3 | – | 5 | 4 | – | 8 |
| Temple | 2 | – | 6 | 3 | – | 9 |
| UAB | 2 | – | 6 | 3 | – | 9 |
| Florida Atlantic | 1 | – | 7 | 3 | – | 9 |
| Tulsa | 1 | – | 7 | 3 | – | 9 |
Championship: Army 35, Tulane 14
$ – Conference champion; y – Championship game participant; Rankings from AP Poll

The 2024 Rice Owls football team represented Rice University in the American Athletic Conference (AAC) during the 2024 NCAA Division I FBS football season. The Owls were led by Mike Bloomgren in his seventh year as the head coach. The Owls played their home games at Rice Stadium, located in Houston.

== Schedule ==
| Date | Time | Opponent | Site | TV | Result | Attendance |
|---|---|---|---|---|---|---|
| August 31 | 6:00 p.m. | Sam Houston* | Rice Stadium; Houston, TX | ESPN+ | L 14–34 | 17,298 |
| September 7 | 6:00 p.m. | Texas Southern* | Rice Stadium; Houston, TX | ESPN+ | W 69–7 | 17,760 |
| September 14 | 7:00 p.m. | at Houston* | TDECU Stadium; Houston, TX (rivalry) | ESPN+ | L 7–33 | 28,146 |
| September 21 | 11:00 a.m. | at Army | Michie Stadium; West Point, NY | CBSSN | L 14–37 | 26,654 |
| September 28 | 6:00 p.m. | Charlotte | Rice Stadium; Houston, TX | ESPN+ | L 20–21 | 17,455 |
| October 12 | 6:00 p.m. | UTSA | Rice Stadium; Houston, TX | ESPN+ | W 29–27 | 18,660 |
| October 19 | 2:30 p.m. | at Tulane | Yulman Stadium; New Orleans, LA | ESPN+ | L 10–24 | 22,897 |
| October 26 | 2:30 p.m. | at UConn* | Rentschler Field; East Hartford, CT | CBSSN | L 10–17 | 23,711 |
| November 2 | 3:00 p.m. | Navy | Rice Stadium; Houston, TX | ESPN2 | W 24–10 | 21,253 |
| November 8 | 8:00 p.m. | at Memphis | Simmons Bank Liberty Stadium; Memphis, TN | ESPN2 | L 20–27 | 23,692 |
| November 23 | 1:00 p.m. | at UAB | Protective Stadium; Birmingham, AL | ESPN+ | L 14–40 | 16,181 |
| November 30 | 1:00 p.m. | South Florida | Rice Stadium; Houston, TX | ESPN+ | W 35–28 | 16,430 |
*Non-conference game; All times are in Central time

== Game summaries ==
=== Sam Houston ===
Sam Houston Bearkats (0–0) at Rice Owls (0–0) – Game summary

| Quarter | 1 | 2 | 3 | 4 | Total |
|---|---|---|---|---|---|
| Bearkats | 17 | 7 | 10 | 0 | 34 |
| Owls | 0 | 7 | 7 | 0 | 14 |

at Rice Stadium • Houston, Texas

- Date: August 31st
- Game time: 6:00 p.m. CDT
- Game weather: Sunny • Temperature: 85 °F (29 °C) • Wind: NE at 8 miles per hour (13 km/h)
- Game attendance: 17,298
- Referee: Reid Jackson
- TV announcers (ESPN+): Chuckie Kempf (play-by-play), Doc Holliday (analyst)

Game information

First quarter

- (9:42) SHSU – Qua'Vez Humphreys 67 yard pass from Hunter Watson, Christian Pavon kick (Drive: 1 play, 67 yards, 0:12; Sam Houston 7–0)
- (8:52) SHSU – David Fisher 30 yard interception return, Christian Pavon kick (Sam Houston 14–0)
- (3:37) SHSU – Christian Pavon 52 yard field goal (Drive: 9 plays, 42 yards, 3:43; Sam Houston 17–0)

Second quarter

- (11:17) RICE – Kobie Campbell 22 yard pass from E.J. Warner, Tim Horn kick (Drive: 5 plays, 50 yards, 2:40; Sam Houston 17–7)
- (1:53) SHSU – Ife Adeyi 32 yard pass from Hunter Watson, Christian Pavon kick (Drive: 6 plays, 56 yards, 2:10; Sam Houston 24–7)

Third quarter

- (10:17) SHSU – John Gentry 1 yard run, Christian Pavon kick (Drive: 10 plays, 76 yards, 4:39; Sam Houston 31–7)
- (7:31) RICE – Dean Connors 15 yard run, Tim Horn kick (Drive: 7 plays, 65 yards, 2:46; Sam Houston 31–14)
- (3:38) SHSU – Christian Pavon 26 yard field goal (Drive: 10 plays, 67 yards, 3:53; Sam Houston 34–14)

Fourth quarter

- No scoring plays

| Statistics | SHSU | RICE |
|---|---|---|
| First downs | 20 | 14 |
| Plays–yards | 73–407 | 62–274 |
| Rushes–yards | 46–178 | 18–47 |
| Passing yards | 229 | 227 |
| Passing: Comp–Att–Int | 16–27–0 | 27–44–2 |
| Time of possession | 35:20 | 24:40 |

| Team | Category | Player | Statistics |
|---|---|---|---|
| Sam Houston | Passing | Hunter Watson | 16/27, 229 yards, 2 TD |
| Sam Houston | Rushing | Hunter Watson | 14 carries, 57 yards |
| Sam Houston | Receiving | Qua'Vez Humphreys | 3 receptions, 93 yards, 1 TD |
| Rice | Passing | E.J. Warner | 27/44, 227 yards, 1 TD, 2 INT |
| Rice | Rushing | Dean Connors | 12 carries, 52 yards, 1 TD |
| Rice | Receiving | Matt Sykes | 6 receptions, 74 yards |

=== Texas Southern (FCS) ===
Texas Southern Tigers (FCS) (1–0) at Rice Owls (0–1) – Game summary

| Quarter | 1 | 2 | 3 | 4 | Total |
|---|---|---|---|---|---|
| Tigers (FCS) | 0 | 0 | 0 | 7 | 7 |
| Owls | 14 | 24 | 17 | 14 | 69 |

at Rice Stadium • Houston, Texas

- Date: September 7th
- Game time: 6:00 p.m. CDT
- Game weather: Sunny • Temperature: 85 °F (29 °C) • Wind: NE at 13 miles per hour (21 km/h)
- Game attendance: 17,760
- Referee: James Jones
- TV announcers (ESPN+): Shawn Kenney (play-by-play), LaDarrin McLane (analyst)

Game information

First quarter

- (8:43) RICE – Dean Connors 5 yard run, Enock Gota kick (Drive: 8 plays, 68 yards, 3:51; Rice 7–0)
- (1:15) RICE – Braylen Walker 4 yard pass from E.J. Warner, Enock Gota kick (Drive: 11 plays, 56 yards, 5:08; Rice 14–0)

Second quarter

- (11:48) RICE – Matt Sykes 34 yard pass from E.J. Warner, Enock Gota kick (Drive: 1 play, 34 yards, 0:07; Rice 21–0)
- (10:59) RICE – Tyson Flowers 34 yard interception return, Enock Gota kick (Rice 28–0)
- (6:46) RICE – Dean Connors 5 yard run, Enock Gota kick (Drive: 3 plays, 47 yards, 1:22; Rice 35–0)
- (0:02) RICE – Enock Gota 25 yard field goal (Drive: 15 plays, 67 yards, 1:56; Rice 38–0)

Third quarter

- (14:37) RICE – Dean Connors 71 yard run, Enock Gota kick (Drive: 1 play, 71 yards, 0:14; Rice 45–0)
- (8:59) RICE – Enock Gota 44 yard field goal (Drive: 6 plays, 29 yards, 2:58; Rice 48–0)
- (1:04) RICE – Taji Atkins 5 yard run, Enock Gota kick (Drive: 11 plays, 78 yards, 6:28; Rice 55–0)

Fourth quarter

- (10:08) RICE – Taji Atkins 33 yard run, Enock Gota kick (Drive: 3 plays, 45 yards, 1:31; Rice 62–0)
- (7:07) RICE – Coleman Bennett 22 yard run, Tim Horn kick (Drive: 2 plays, 28 yards, 0:54; Rice 69–0)
- (0:14) TXSO – Kordell Rodgers 12 yard pass from Jordon Davis, Gustavo Romero kick (Drive: 13 plays, 75 yards, 6:53; Rice 69–7)

| Statistics | TXSO | RICE |
|---|---|---|
| First downs | 9 | 24 |
| Plays–yards | 53–87 | 64–533 |
| Rushes–yards | 34–38 | 32–329 |
| Passing yards | 49 | 204 |
| Passing: Comp–Att–Int | 10–19–2 | 22–32–1 |
| Time of possession | 33:04 | 26:56 |

| Team | Category | Player | Statistics |
|---|---|---|---|
| Texas Southern | Passing | Jordon Davis | 8/13, 42 yards, 1 TD, 1 INT |
| Texas Southern | Rushing | Danny Green Jr. | 7 carries, 18 yards |
| Texas Southern | Receiving | Kordell Rodgers | 3 receptions, 23 yards, 1 TD |
| Rice | Passing | E.J. Warner | 20/30, 189 yards, 2 TD, 1 INT |
| Rice | Rushing | Dean Connors | 9 carries, 113 yards, 3 TD |
| Rice | Receiving | Matt Sykes | 2 receptions, 47 yards, 1 TD |

=== at Houston (rivalry) ===
Rice Owls (1–1) at Houston Cougars (0–2) – Game summary

| Quarter | 1 | 2 | 3 | 4 | Total |
|---|---|---|---|---|---|
| Owls | 0 | 0 | 0 | 7 | 7 |
| Cougars | 14 | 6 | 6 | 7 | 33 |

at TDECU Stadium • Houston, Texas

- Date: September 14th
- Game time: 7:00 p.m. CDT
- Game weather: Clear • Temperature: 92 °F (33 °C) • Wind: S at 7 miles per hour (11 km/h)
- Game attendance: 28,146
- Referee: Kevin Boitmann
- TV announcers (ESPN+): Lowell Galindo (play-by-play), Fozzy Whittaker (analyst), Tori Petry (sideline reporter)

Game information

First quarter

- (5:30) HOU – Stacy Sneed 65 yard run, Joseph Kim kick (Drive: 2 plays, 75 yards, 0:34; Houston 7–0)
- (3:49) HOU – Mekhi Mews 75 yard punt return, Joseph Kim kick (Houston 14–0)

Second quarter

- (7:29) HOU – Stephon Johnson 44 yard pass from Donovan Smith, kick failed (Drive: 1 play, 44 yards, 0:11; Houston 20–0)

Third quarter

- (2:24) HOU – Donovan Smith 1 yard run, 2-point pass failed (Drive: 1 play, 1 yard, 0:05; Houston 26–0)

Fourth quarter

- (7:10) HOU – Donovan Smith 37 yard run, Joseph Kim kick (Drive: 7 plays, 56 yards, 3:21; Houston 33–0)
- (1:08) RICE – Dean Connors 4 yard run, Enock Gota kick (Drive: 12 plays, 70 yards, 5:56; Houston 33–7)

| Statistics | RICE | HOU |
|---|---|---|
| First downs | 9 | 16 |
| Plays–yards | 51–159 | 63–379 |
| Rushes–yards | 24–75 | 42–237 |
| Passing yards | 84 | 142 |
| Passing: Comp–Att–Int | 16–27–1 | 12–21–0 |
| Time of possession | 28:03 | 31:57 |

| Team | Category | Player | Statistics |
|---|---|---|---|
| Rice | Passing | E.J. Warner | 12/21, 50 yards, 1 INT |
| Rice | Rushing | Dean Connors | 11 carries, 32 yards, 1 TD |
| Rice | Receiving | Christian Francisco | 2 receptions, 26 yards |
| Houston | Passing | Donovan Smith | 12/21, 142 yards, 1 TD |
| Houston | Rushing | Stacy Sneed | 7 carries, 82 yards, 1 TD |
| Houston | Receiving | Stephon Johnson | 1 reception, 44 yards, 1 TD |

=== at Army ===
Rice Owls (1–2) at Army Black Knights (2–0) – Game summary

| Quarter | 1 | 2 | 3 | 4 | Total |
|---|---|---|---|---|---|
| Owls | 0 | 0 | 7 | 7 | 14 |
| Black Knights | 7 | 21 | 9 | 0 | 37 |

at Michie Stadium • West Point, New York

- Date: September 21st
- Game time: 11:00 a.m. CDT
- Game weather: Sunny • Temperature: 72 °F (22 °C) • Wind: NE at 5 miles per hour (8.0 km/h)
- Game attendance: 26,654
- Referee: Steven Anderson
- TV announcers (CBSSN): Dave Ryan (play-by-play), Adam Breneman and Tina Cervasio (sideline reporter)

Game information

First quarter

- (12:08) ARMY – Noah Short 41 yard pass from Bryson Daily, Trey Gronotte kick (Drive: 5 plays, 70 yards, 2:52; Army 7–0)

Second quarter

- (14:20) ARMY – Bryson Daily 7 yard run, Trey Gronotte kick (Drive: 17 plays, 90 yards, 10:52; Army 14–0)
- (1:56) ARMY – Bryson Daily 2 yard run, Trey Gronotte kick (Drive: 9 plays, 57 yards, 5:33; Army 21–0)
- (0:28) ARMY – Casey Reynolds 17 yard pass from Bryson Daily, Trey Gronotte kick (Drive: 7 plays, 50 yards, 1:16; Army 28–0)

Third quarter

- (13:09) ARMY – Team safety (Army 30–0)
- (5:55) RICE – Matt Sykes 16 yard pass from E.J. Warner, Enock Gota kick (Drive: 7 plays, 38 yards, 3:33; Army 30–7)
- (0:02) ARMY – Bryson Daily 1 yard run, Trey Gronotte kick (Drive: 9 plays, 75 yards, 5:53; Army 37–7)

Fourth quarter

- (14:20) RICE – Christian Francisco 5 yard pass from E.J. Warner, Enock Gota kick (Drive: 13 plays, 70 yards, 3:07; Army 37–14)

| Statistics | RICE | ARMY |
|---|---|---|
| First downs | 18 | 21 |
| Plays–yards | 57–297 | 69–408 |
| Rushes–yards | 13–41 | 56–288 |
| Passing yards | 256 | 120 |
| Passing: Comp–Att–Int | 29–44–2 | 9–13–0 |
| Time of possession | 20:55 | 39:05 |

| Team | Category | Player | Statistics |
|---|---|---|---|
| Rice | Passing | E.J. Warner | 28/43, 235 yards, 2 TD, 2 INT |
| Rice | Rushing | Dean Connors | 9 carries, 51 yards |
| Rice | Receiving | Matt Sykes | 6 receptions, 82 yards, 1 TD |
| Army | Passing | Bryson Daily | 6/9, 107 yards, 2 TD |
| Army | Rushing | Bryson Daily | 23 carries, 145 yards, 3 TD |
| Army | Receiving | Noah Short | 2 receptions, 47 yards, 1 TD |

=== Charlotte ===
Charlotte 49ers (1–3) at Rice Owls (1–3) – Game summary

| Quarter | 1 | 2 | 3 | 4 | Total |
|---|---|---|---|---|---|
| 49ers | 0 | 0 | 14 | 7 | 21 |
| Owls | 0 | 10 | 0 | 10 | 20 |

at Rice Stadium • Houston, Texas

- Date: September 28th
- Game time: 6:00 p.m. CDT
- Game weather: Sunny • Temperature: 90 °F (32 °C) • Wind: NW at 7 miles per hour (11 km/h)
- Game attendance: 17,455
- Referee: Darryl DeBerry
- TV announcers (ESPN+): Ted Emrich (play-by-play) and Charlie Strong (analyst)

Game information

First quarter

No scoring plays

Second quarter

- (12:04) RICE – Quinton Jackson 13-yard pass from E. J. Warner, Enock Gota kick (Drive: 8 plays, 80 yards, 3:27; Rice 7–0)
- (1:38) RICE – Enock Gota 32-yard field goal (Drive: 10 plays, 24 yards, 3:38; Rice 10–0)

Third quarter

- (10:52) CHA – O'Mega Blake 32-yard pass from Deshawn Purdie, Stephen Rusnak kick (Drive: 5 plays, 66 yards, 2:09; Rice 10–7)
- (2:38) CHA – O'Mega Blake 45-yard pass from Deshawn Purdie, Stephen Rusnak kick (Drive: 10 plays, 84 yards, 5:16; Charlotte 14–10)

Fourth quarter

- (14:46) RICE – Elijah Mojarro 41-yard pass from E. J. Warner, Enock Gota kick (Drive: 7 plays, 75 yards, 2:52; Rice 17–14)
- (6:42) RICE – Enock Gota 25-yard field goal (Drive: 13 plays, 48 yards, 5:24; Rice 20–14)
- (0:47) CHA – Hahsaun Wilson 1-yard run, Stephen Rusnak kick (Drive: 7 plays, 77 yards, 0:58; Charlotte 21–20)

| Statistics | CLT | RICE |
|---|---|---|
| First downs | 17 | 23 |
| Plays–yards | 65–304 | 71–463 |
| Rushes–yards | 29–67 | 31–209 |
| Passing yards | 237 | 254 |
| Passing: Comp–Att–Int | 18–36–1 | 22–40–0 |
| Time of possession | 29:59 | 30:01 |

| Team | Category | Player | Statistics |
|---|---|---|---|
| Charlotte | Passing | Deshawn Purdie | 10/15, 183 yards, 2 TD |
| Charlotte | Rushing | Cartevious Norton | 10 carries, 56 yards |
| Charlotte | Receiving | O'Mega Blake | 5 receptions, 153 yards, 2 TD |
| Rice | Passing | E. J. Warner | 22/40, 254 yards, 2 TD |
| Rice | Rushing | Dean Connors | 14 carries, 121 yards |
| Rice | Receiving | Matt Sykes | 8 receptions, 84 yards |

=== UTSA ===
UTSA Roadrunners (2–3) at Rice Owls (1–4) – Game summary

| Quarter | 1 | 2 | 3 | 4 | Total |
|---|---|---|---|---|---|
| Roadrunners | 0 | 10 | 3 | 14 | 27 |
| Owls | 0 | 9 | 14 | 6 | 29 |

at Rice Stadium • Houston, Texas

- Date: October 12th
- Game time: 6:00 p.m. CDT
- Game weather: Sunny • Temperature: 86 °F (30 °C) • Wind: S at 7 miles per hour (11 km/h)
- Game attendance: 18,660
- Referee: Steven Anderson
- TV announcers (ESPN+): James Westling (play-by-play), Leger Douzable (analyst) and Smacker Miles (sideline)

Game information

First quarter

No scoring plays

Second quarter

- (6:30) UTSA – Tate Sandell 45-yard field goal (Drive: 15 plays, 55 yards, 6:19; UTSA 3–0)
- (4:57) RICE – E. J. Warner 5-yard run (Drive: 4 plays, 75 yards, 1:33; Rice 6–3)
- (1:50) UTSA – DJ Allen 20-yard pass from Owen McCown, Tate Sandell kick (Drive: 7 plays, 75 yards, 3:07; UTSA 10–6)
- (0:00) RICE – Enock Gota 46-yard field goal (Drive: 7 plays, 31 yards, 1:49; UTSA 10–9)

Third quarter

- (13:35) RICE – Dean Connors 69-yard pass from E. J. Warner, Dean Connors rush (Drive: 3 plays, 75 yards, 1:25; Rice 17–10)
- (11:26) UTSA – Tate Sandell 52-yard field goal (Drive: 7 plays, 18 yards, 1:59; Rice 17–13)
- (8:01) RICE – Dean Connors 8-yard run (Drive: 6 plays, 75 yards, 3:25; Rice 23–13)

Fourth quarter

- (5:40) UTSA – Devin McCuin 6-yard pass from Owen McCown, Tate Sandell kick (Drive: 10 plays, 80 yards, 2:40; Rice 23–20)
- (2:06) UTSA – Houston Thomas 38-yard pass from Owen McCown, Tate Sandell kick (Drive: 5 plays, 54 yards, 2:02; UTSA 27–23)
- (0:04) RICE – Matt Sykes 18-yard pass from E. J. Warner (Drive: 8 plays, 65 yards, 1:57; Rice 29–27)

| Statistics | UTSA | RICE |
|---|---|---|
| First downs | 22 | 21 |
| Plays–yards | 78–394 | 60–389 |
| Rushes–yards | 35–138 | 21–42 |
| Passing yards | 256 | 347 |
| Passing: Comp–Att–Int | 28–43–0 | 25–39–0 |
| Time of possession | 30:33 | 29:27 |

| Team | Category | Player | Statistics |
|---|---|---|---|
| UTSA | Passing | Owen McCown | 28/43, 256 yards, 3 TD |
| UTSA | Rushing | Owen McCown | 9 carries, 53 yards |
| UTSA | Receiving | Devin McCuin | 7 receptions, 83 yards, TD |
| Rice | Passing | E. J. Warner | 25/39, 347 yards, 2 TD |
| Rice | Rushing | Dean Connors | 8 carries, 27 yards, TD |
| Rice | Receiving | Dean Connors | 5 receptions, 109 yards, TD |

=== at Tulane ===
Rice Owls (2–4) at Tulane Green Wave (4–2) – Game summary

| Quarter | 1 | 2 | 3 | 4 | Total |
|---|---|---|---|---|---|
| Owls | 0 | 7 | 3 | 0 | 10 |
| Green Wave | 3 | 7 | 0 | 14 | 24 |

at Yulman Stadium • New Orleans, Louisiana

- Date: October 19th
- Game time: 2:30 p.m. CDT
- Game weather: Sunny • Temperature: 77 °F (25 °C) • Wind: NE 12 miles per hour (19 km/h)
- Game attendance: 22,897
- Referee: Charles Lamertina
- TV announcers (ESPN+): James Westling (play-by-play) and Leger Douzable (analyst)

Game information

First quarter

- (1:43) TULN – Jacob Barnes 28-yard field goal (Drive: 10 plays, 36 yards, 6:33; Tulane 3–0)

Second quarter

- (14:12) RICE – Elijah Mojarro 31-yard pass from E. J. Warner, Tim Horn kick (Drive: 5 plays, 75 yards, 2:31; Rice 7–3)
- (1:04) TULN – Makhi Hughes 29-yard pass from Darian Mensah, Jacob Barnes kick (Drive: 6 plays, 62 yards, 2:18; Tulane 10–7)

Third quarter

- (6:48) RICE – Tim Horn 35-yard field goal (Drive: 9 plays, 56 yards, 4:23; Tied 10–10)

Fourth quarter

- (8:22) TULN – Makhi Hughes 1-yard run, Jacob Barnes kick (Drive: 7 plays, 70 yards, 4:28; Tulane 17–10)
- (1:35) TULN – Sam Howard 15-yard fumble recovery, Jacob Barnes kick (Tulane 24–10)

| Statistics | RICE | TULN |
|---|---|---|
| First downs | 16 | 18 |
| Plays–yards | 63–344 | 65–306 |
| Rushes–yards | 17–73 | 40–154 |
| Passing yards | 271 | 152 |
| Passing: Comp–Att–Int | 26–46–3 | 12–25–0 |
| Time of possession | 25:03 | 34:57 |

| Team | Category | Player | Statistics |
|---|---|---|---|
| Rice | Passing | E. J. Warner | 26/46, 271 yards, TD, 3 INT |
| Rice | Rushing | Dean Connors | 11 carries, 76 yards |
| Rice | Receiving | Kobie Campbell | 6 receptions, 100 yards |
| Tulane | Passing | Darian Mensah | 12/25, 152 yards, TD |
| Tulane | Rushing | Makhi Hughes | 27 carries, 140 yards, TD |
| Tulane | Receiving | Dontae Fleming | 2 receptions, 36 yards |

=== at UConn ===
Rice Owls (2–5) at UConn Huskies (4–3) – Game summary

| Quarter | 1 | 2 | 3 | 4 | Total |
|---|---|---|---|---|---|
| Owls | 3 | 0 | 0 | 7 | 10 |
| Huskies | 0 | 0 | 7 | 10 | 17 |

at Rentschler Field • East Hartford, Connecticut

- Date: October 26th
- Game time: 2:30 p.m. CDT
- Game weather: Temperature: 65 °F (18 °C) • Wind: SE at 13 miles per hour (21 km/h) • Weather: Sunny
- Game attendance: 23,711
- Referee: Gary Patterson
- TV announcers (CBSSN): Jordan Kent (play-by-play), Logan Ryan (color analyst) & Keiana Martin (sideline)

Game information

First quarter

- RICE - Horn, Tim 23 yd field goal, 2:35. Owls 3–0. Drive: 5 plays, 20 yards, TOP 02:13

Second quarter

No scoring plays

Third quarter

- CONN - Robinson, Durell 68 yd run (Freeman, Chris kick), 7:02. Huskies 7–3. Drive: 1 plays, 68 yards, TOP 00:10

Fourth quarter

- CONN - Edwards, Cam 4 yd run (Freeman, Chris kick), 10:15. Huskies 14–3. Drive: 7 plays, 72 yards, TOP 03:52
- CONN - Freeman, Chris 30 yd field goal, 3:40. Huskies 17–3. Drive: 9 plays, 31 yards, TOP 04:54
- RICE - Jackson, Quinton 100 yd kickoff return (Horn, Tim kick), 3:28. Huskies 17–10. Drive: 1 play, 100 yards

| Statistics | RICE | CONN |
|---|---|---|
| First downs | 10 | 18 |
| Plays–yards | 62–178 | 68–309 |
| Rushes–yards | 32–90 | 44–181 |
| Passing yards | 88 | 128 |
| Passing: Comp–Att–Int | 14–30–0 | 9–24–1 |
| Time of possession | 28:26 | 31:34 |

| Team | Category | Player | Statistics |
|---|---|---|---|
| Rice | Passing | Drew Devillier | 14/30, 88 yards |
| Rice | Rushing | Dean Connors | 20 carries, 46 yards |
| Rice | Receiving | Matt Sykes | 3 receptions, 24 yards |
| UConn | Passing | Nick Evers | 9/24, 128 yards, INT |
| UConn | Rushing | Durell Robinson | 15 carries, 132 yards, TD |
| UConn | Receiving | Skyler Bell | 3 receptions, 47 yards |

=== Navy ===
Navy Midshipmen (6–1) at Rice Owls (2–6) – Game summary

| Quarter | 1 | 2 | 3 | 4 | Total |
|---|---|---|---|---|---|
| Midshipmen | 0 | 7 | 0 | 3 | 10 |
| Owls | 14 | 3 | 7 | 0 | 24 |

at Rice Stadium • Houston, Texas

- Date: November 2nd
- Game time: 3:00 p.m. CDT
- Game weather: Rain • Temperature: 76 °F (24 °C) • Wind: SW 10 miles per hour (16 km/h)
- Game attendance: 21,253
- Referee: Reid Jackson
- TV announcers (ESPN2): Mike Monaco (play-by-play), Kirk Morrison (analyst) and Dawn Davenport (sideline)

Game information

First quarter

- (9:30) RICE – Dean Connors 4-yard run, Tim Horn kick (Drive: 5 plays, 45 yards, 2:05; Rice 7–0)
- (2:41) RICE – Matt Sykes 17-yard pass from E. J. Warner, Tim Horn kick (Drive: 7 plays, 62 yards, 3:53; Rice 14–0)

Second quarter

- (12:41) RICE – Tim Horn 47-yard field goal (Drive: 10 plays, 45 yards, 4:01; Rice 17–0)
- (8:48) NAVY – Blake Horvath 9-yard run, Nathan Kirkwood kick (Drive: 8 plays, 75 yards, 3:53; Rice 17–7)

Third quarter

- (2:00) RICE – Dean Connors 9-yard run, Tim Horn kick (Drive: 11 plays, 80 yards, 5:38; Rice 24–7)

Fourth quarter

- (8:34) NAVY – Nathan Kirkwood 21-yard field goal (Drive: 18 plays, 71 yards, 8:26; Rice 24–10)

| Statistics | NAVY | RICE |
|---|---|---|
| First downs | 12 | 20 |
| Plays–yards | 61–260 | 65–344 |
| Rushes–yards | 40–140 | 25–105 |
| Passing yards | 120 | 239 |
| Passing: Comp–Att–Int | 10–21–2 | 28–40–1 |
| Time of possession | 28:46 | 31:14 |

| Team | Category | Player | Statistics |
|---|---|---|---|
| Navy | Passing | Blake Horvath | 10/21, 120 yards, 2 INT |
| Navy | Rushing | Blake Horvath | 16 carries, 64 yards, TD |
| Navy | Receiving | Eli Heidenreich | 3 receptions, 56 yards |
| Rice | Passing | E. J. Warner | 28/40, 239 yards, TD, INT |
| Rice | Rushing | Dean Connors | 18 carries, 105 yards, 2 TD |
| Rice | Receiving | Matt Sykes | 8 receptions, 93 yards, TD |

=== at Memphis ===
Rice Owls (3–6) at Memphis Tigers (7–2) – Game summary

| Quarter | 1 | 2 | 3 | 4 | Total |
|---|---|---|---|---|---|
| Owls | 6 | 7 | 0 | 7 | 20 |
| Tigers | 0 | 17 | 0 | 10 | 27 |

at Simmons Bank Liberty Stadium • Memphis, Tennessee

- Date: November 8th
- Game time: 8:00 p.m. CST
- Game weather: Cloudy • Temperature: 61 °F (16 °C) • Wind: E 7 miles per hour (11 km/h)
- Game attendance: 23,692
- Referee: Charles Lamertina
- TV announcers (ESPN2): Beth Mowins (play-by-play), Andre Ware (analyst) and Paul Carcaterra (sideline)

Game information

First quarter

- (8:20) RICE – Tim Horn 25-yard field goal (Drive: 5 plays, 13 yards, 2:14; Rice 3–0)
- (0:24) RICE – Tim Horn 28-yard field goal (Drive: 11 plays, 76 yards, 5:06; Rice 6–0)

Second quarter

- (6:21) MEM – Brendan Doyle 9-yard pass from Seth Henigan, Tristian Vandenberg kick (Drive: 12 plays, 77 yards, 5:44; Memphis 7–6)
- (1:28) MEM – Mario Anderson Jr. 10-yard run, Tristian Vandenberg kick (Drive: 5 plays, 73 yards, 1:39; Memphis 14–6)
- (0:38) RICE – Matt Sykes 27-yard pass from E. J. Warner, Tim Horn kick (Drive: 5 plays, 75 yards, 0:50; Memphis 14–13)
- (0:02) MEM – Tristian Vandenberg 42-yard field goal (Drive: 6 plays, 51 yards, 0:36; Memphis 17–13)

Third quarter

No scoring plays

Fourth quarter

- (11:42) MEM – Brandon Thomas 14-yard run, Tristian Vandenberg kick (Drive: 10 plays, 92 yards, 4:14; Memphis 24–13)
- (4:23) MEM – Tristian Vandenberg 42-yard field goal (Drive: 6 plays, 17 yards, 3:40; Memphis 27–13)
- (1:55) RICE – Elijah Mojarro 5-yard pass from E. J. Warner, Tim Horn kick (Drive: 8 plays, 75 yards, 2:28; Memphis 27–20)

| Statistics | RICE | MEM |
|---|---|---|
| First downs | 20 | 22 |
| Plays–yards | 68–367 | 72–366 |
| Rushes–yards | 23–121 | 41–207 |
| Passing yards | 246 | 159 |
| Passing: Comp–Att–Int | 29–45–0 | 14–31–1 |
| Time of possession | 30:11 | 29:47 |

| Team | Category | Player | Statistics |
|---|---|---|---|
| Rice | Passing | E. J. Warner | 29/45, 246 yards, 2 TD |
| Rice | Rushing | Quinton Jackson | 6 carries, 70 yards |
| Rice | Receiving | Matt Sykes | 6 receptions, 76 yards, TD |
| Memphis | Passing | Seth Henigan | 14/31, 159 yards, TD, INT |
| Memphis | Rushing | Mario Anderson Jr. | 25 carries, 144 yards, TD |
| Memphis | Receiving | Roc Taylor | 4 receptions, 52 yards |

=== at UAB ===
Rice Owls (3–7) at UAB Blazers (2–8) – Game summary

| Quarter | 1 | 2 | 3 | 4 | Total |
|---|---|---|---|---|---|
| Owls | 14 | 0 | 0 | 0 | 14 |
| Blazers | 14 | 13 | 0 | 13 | 40 |

at Protective Stadium • Birmingham, Alabama

- Date: November 23rd
- Game time: 1:00 p.m. CST
- Game weather: Sunny, 60 °F (16 °C)
- Game attendance: 16,181
- Referee: Darryl DeBerry
- TV announcers (ESPN+): Justin Kutcher (play-by-play) and Dave Steckel (analyst)

Game information

First quarter

- (10:28) RIC – Dean Connors 5-yard run, Tim Horn kick (Drive: 4 plays, 82 yards, 1:51; Rice 7–0)
- (10:10) UAB – Malachi Holt-Bennett 5-yard pass from Jalen Kitna, Jonah Delange kick (Drive: 1 play, 5 yards, 0:05; Tied 7–7)
- (5:28) UAB – Lee Beebe Jr. 48-yard run, Jonah Delange kick (Drive: 7 plays, 80 yards, 3:03; UAB 14–7)
- (3:05) RIC – Colin Giffen 5-yard pass from E. J. Warner, Tim Horn kick (Drive: 1 play, 5 yards, 0:03; Tied 14–14)

Second quarter

- (12:50) UAB – Jonah Delange 32-yard field goal (Drive: 10 plays, 61 yards, 5:15; UAB 17–14)
- (1:45) UAB – Jonah Delange 43-yard field goal (Drive: 4 plays, -2 yards, 0:41; UAB 20–14)
- (0:00) UAB – Adrian Maddox 99-yard interception, Jonah Delange kick (UAB 27–14)

Third quarter

No scoring plays

Fourth quarter

- (11:01) UAB – Lee Beebe Jr. 7-yard run (Drive: 13 plays, 94 yards, 7:28; UAB 33–14)
- (7:42) UAB – Corri Milliner 45-yard pass from Jalen Kitna, Jonah Delange kick (Drive: 1 play, 45 yards, 0:08; UAB 40–14)

| Statistics | RICE | UAB |
|---|---|---|
| First downs | 18 | 21 |
| Plays–yards | 74–337 | 57–364 |
| Rushes–yards | 25–115 | 34–190 |
| Passing yards | 222 | 174 |
| Passing: Comp–Att–Int | 28–49–3 | 18–23–0 |
| Time of possession | 30:44 | 29:16 |

| Team | Category | Player | Statistics |
|---|---|---|---|
| Rice | Passing | E. J. Warner | 28/49, 222 yards, TD, 3 INT |
| Rice | Rushing | Dean Connors | 16 carries, 62 yards, TD |
| Rice | Receiving | Braylen Walker | 2 receptions, 54 yards |
| UAB | Passing | Jalen Kitna | 18/23, 174 yards, 2 TD |
| UAB | Rushing | Lee Beebe Jr. | 16 carries, 161 yards, 2 TD |
| UAB | Receiving | Corri Milliner | 6 receptions, 90 yards, TD |

=== South Florida ===
South Florida Bulls (6–5) at Rice Owls (3–8) – Game summary

| Quarter | 1 | 2 | 3 | 4 | Total |
|---|---|---|---|---|---|
| Bulls | 7 | 0 | 7 | 14 | 28 |
| Owls | 17 | 10 | 8 | 0 | 35 |

at Rice Stadium • Houston, Texas

- Date: November 30th
- Game time: 1:00 p.m. CST
- Game weather: Sunny • Temperature: 61 °F (16 °C) • Wind: E 8 miles per hour (13 km/h)
- Game attendance: 16,430
- Referee: Tim Rich
- TV announcers (ESPN+): David Salzman (play-by-play) and LaDarrin McLane (analyst)

Game information

First quarter

- (12:33) RIC – Drayden Dickmann 31-yard pass from E. J. Warner, Tim Horn kick (Drive: 5 plays, 92 yards, 2:17; Rice 7–0)
- (9:14) USF – Nay'Quan Wright 1-yard run, John Cannon kick (Drive: 10 plays, 75 yards, 3:19; Tied 7–7)
- (7:44) RIC – Quinton Jackosn 12-yard run, Tim Horn kick (Drive: 3 plays, 38 yards, 1:23; Rice 14–7)
- (0:22) RIC – Tim Horn 25-yard field goal (Drive: 6 plays, 15 yards, 1:38; Rice 17–7)

Second quarter

- (6:32) RIC – Dean Connors 23-yard pass from E. J. Warner, Tim Horn kick (Drive: 10 plays, 75 yards, 4:49; Rice 24–7)
- (0:12) RIC – Tim Horn 25-yard field goal (Drive: 11 plays, 58 yards, 5:03; Rice 27–7)

Third quarter

- (12:22) USF – Sean Atkins 16-yard pass from Bryce Archie, John Cannon kick (Drive: 7 plays, 75 yards, 2:38; Rice 27–14)
- (6:26) RIC – Thai Chiaokhiao-Bowman 33-yard pass from E. J. Warner, Matt Sykes pass (Drive: 3 plays, 65 yards, 0:57; Rice 35–14)

Fourth quarter

- (3:09) USF – Keshaun Singleton 28-yard pass from Israel Carter, John Cannon kick (Drive: 9 plays, 87 yards, 2:12; Rice 35–21)
- (2:25) USF – Michael Brown-Stephens 32-yard pass from Israel Carter, John Cannon kick (Drive: 3 plays, 42 yards, 0:28; Rice 35–28)

| Statistics | USF | RICE |
|---|---|---|
| First downs | 18 | 27 |
| Plays–yards | 72–431 | 82–550 |
| Rushes–yards | 30–111 | 40–120 |
| Passing yards | 320 | 430 |
| Passing: Comp–Att–Int | 24–42–1 | 27–42–0 |
| Time of possession | 21:23 | 38:38 |

| Team | Category | Player | Statistics |
|---|---|---|---|
| South Florida | Passing | Bryce Archie | 19/35, 227 yards, TD, INT |
| South Florida | Rushing | Nay'Quan Wright | 6 carries, 35 yards, TD |
| South Florida | Receiving | Sean Atkins | 7 receptions, 110 yards, TD |
| Rice | Passing | E. J. Warner | 27/42, 430 yards, 3 TD |
| Rice | Rushing | Christian Francisco | 12 carries, 42 yards |
| Rice | Receiving | Matt Sykes | 7 receptions, 118 yards |
