= Rayshawn Pleasant =

American football player

No. 4 – Auburn Tigers
- Position: Cornerback
- Class: Redshirt Senior

Personal information
- Listed height: 5 ft 11 in (1.80 m)
- Listed weight: 200 lb (91 kg)

Career information
- High school: West Monroe (West Monroe, Louisiana)
- College: Tulane (2022–2024); Auburn (2025–present)

Awards and highlights
- First-team All-American (2024); Second-team All-AAC (2024)
- Stats at ESPN

Rayshawn Pleasant is an American college football cornerback and return specialist for the Auburn Tigers. He previously played for the Tulane Green Wave. Only player in FBS history to have 5 non-offensive touchdowns within 22 games(reached it the fastest).

== Early life ==
Pleasant attended West Monroe High School in West Monroe, Louisiana. He was rated as a three-star recruit and committed to play college football for the Tulane Green Wave.

== College career ==
=== Tulane ===
As a freshman in 2023, Pleasant appeared in nine games where he notched five tackles. In the 2024 season opener, he returned an interception 100 yards for a touchdown in a 52-0 win over Southeastern Louisiana, earning American Athletic Conference defensive player of the week honors. In week 4, Pleasant notched a 94-yard kickoff return touchdown in a win over Louisiana. In week 6, he returned a kickoff 100 yards for a touchdown in a 71-20 win over UAB, where for his performance he was named the American Athletic special teams player of the week.

On April 16, 2025, Pleasant announced that he would enter the transfer portal.

=== Auburn ===
On April 23, 2025, Pleasant announced that he would transfer to Auburn.
