= 2024 UAB Blazers football team =

American college football season

2024 UAB Blazers football
- Conference: American Athletic Conference
- Record: 3–9 (2–6 AAC)
- Head coach: Trent Dilfer (2nd season)
- Offensive coordinator: Alex Mortensen (2nd season)
- Offensive scheme: Multiple
- Defensive coordinator: Sione Ta'ufo'ou (2nd season)
- Base defense: Multiple 3–4
- Home stadium: Protective Stadium

Uniform
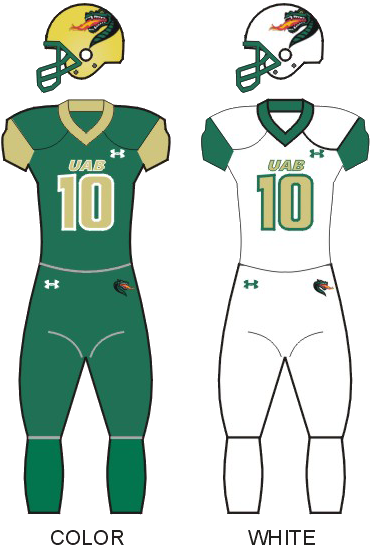

2024 American Athletic Conference football standings
	Conf.			Overall
Team	W		L	W		L
No. 21 Army y$	8	–	0	12	–	2
Tulane y	7	–	1	9	–	5
Navy	6	–	2	10	–	3
No. 24 Memphis	6	–	2	11	–	2
East Carolina	5	–	3	8	–	5
South Florida	4	–	4	7	–	6
UTSA	4	–	4	7	–	6
Charlotte	4	–	4	5	–	7
North Texas	3	–	5	6	–	7
Rice	3	–	5	4	–	8
Temple	2	–	6	3	–	9
UAB	2	–	6	3	–	9
Florida Atlantic	1	–	7	3	–	9
Tulsa	1	–	7	3	–	9
Championship: Army 35, Tulane 14
$ – Conference champion; y – Championship game participant; Rankings from AP Poll

The 2024 UAB Blazers football team represented the University of Alabama at Birmingham (UAB) as a member the American Athletic Conference (AAC) during the 2024 NCAA Division I FBS football season. Led by second-year head coach Trent Dilfer, the Blazers compiled an overall record of 3–9 with a mark of 2–6 in conference play, tying for 11th place in the AAC. UAB played home games at Protective Stadium in Birmingham, Alabama.

== Schedule ==
Date	Time	Opponent	Site	TV	Result	Attendance
August 29	7:00 p.m.	Alcorn State*	Protective Stadium; Birmingham, AL	ESPN+	W 41–3	21,267
September 7	6:00 p.m.	at Louisiana–Monroe*	Malone Stadium; Monroe, LA	ESPN+	L 6–32	12,327
September 14	3:15 p.m.	at Arkansas*	Donald W. Reynolds Razorback Stadium; Fayetteville, AR	SECN	L 27–37	75,021
September 28	11:00 a.m.	Navy	Protective Stadium; Birmingham, AL	ESPN2	L 18–41	21,536
October 5	12:00 p.m.	Tulane	Protective Stadium; Birmingham, AL	ESPN+	L 20–71	19,724
October 12	11:00 a.m.	at Army	Michie Stadium; West Point, NY	CBSSN	L 10–44	29,002
October 19	3:30 p.m.	at South Florida	Raymond James Stadium; Tampa, FL	ESPN+	L 25–35	28,154
November 2	1:30 p.m.	Tulsa	Protective Stadium; Birmingham, AL	ESPN+	W 59–21	17,944
November 9	1:30 p.m.	UConn*	Protective Stadium; Birmingham, AL	ESPN+	L 23–31	18,351
November 16	7:00 p.m.	at Memphis	Simmons Bank Liberty Stadium; Memphis, TN (Battle for the Bones)	ESPN2	L 18–53	24,225
November 23	1:00 p.m.	Rice	Protective Stadium; Birmingham, AL	ESPN+	W 40–14	16,181
November 30	2:30 p.m.	at Charlotte	Jerry Richardson Stadium; Charlotte, NC	ESPN+	L 27–29	8,091
*Non-conference game; All times are in Central time

== Game summaries ==
=== Alcorn State ===
Alcorn State Braves (FCS) (0–0) at UAB Blazers (0–0) – Game summary

Quarter	1	2	3	4	Total
Braves (FCS)	3	0	0	0	3
Blazers	14	14	3	10	41

at Protective Stadium • Birmingham, Alabama

- Date: August 29th
- Game time: 7:00 p.m. CDT
- Game weather: Cloudy • Temperature: 85 °F (29 °C) • Wind: SE at 5 miles per hour (8.0 km/h)
- Game attendance: 21,267
- Referee: Edwin Lee
- TV announcers (ESPN+): Nate Gatter (play-by-play) and Jay Sonnhalter (analyst)

Game information

First quarter

- (10:10) UAB – Lee Beebe Jr. 2 yard run, Jonah Delange kick (Drive: 11 plays, 70 yards, 4:44; UAB 7–0)
- (7:56) UAB – Brandon Hawkins Jr. 9 yard pass from Jacob Zeno, Jonah Delange kick (Drive: 3 plays, 6 yards, 0:38; UAB 14–0)
- (2:36) ALCN – Noah Kiani 29 yard field goal (Drive: 6 plays, 19 yards, 3:00; UAB 14–3)

Second quarter

- (6:26) UAB – Amare Thomas 15 yard pass from Jacob Zeno, Jonah Delange kick (Drive: 6 plays, 17 yards, 3:12; UAB 21–3)
- (1:30) UAB – Lee Beebe Jr. 2 yard run, Jonah Delange kick (Drive: 7 plays, 75 yards, 1:55; UAB 28–3)

Third quarter

- (11:26) UAB – Jonah Delange 41 yard field goal (Drive: 9 plays, 37 yards, 2:20; UAB 31–3)

Fourth quarter

- (12:24) UAB – Jonah Delange 24 yard field goal (Drive: 13 plays, 75 yards, 4:31; UAB 34–3)
- (11:49) UAB – Kam Shanks 57 yard punt return, Jonah Delange kick (UAB 41–3)

Statistics	ALCN	UAB
First downs	12	31
Plays–yards	61–177	86–517
Rushes–yards	40–117	53–302
Passing yards	60	215
Passing: Comp–Att–Int	9–21–1	23–33–1
Time of possession	28:32	31:28

Team	Category	Player	Statistics
Alcorn State	Passing	Roderick Hartsfield	1/2, 31 yards
Alcorn State	Rushing	Tyler Macon	12 carries, 37 yards
Alcorn State	Receiving	Deablo McGee	1 reception, 31 yards
UAB	Passing	Jacob Zeno	23/33, 215 yards, 2 TD, 1 INT
UAB	Rushing	Lee Beebe Jr.	15 carries, 82 yards, 2 TD
UAB	Receiving	Kam Shanks	6 receptions, 73 yards

=== at Louisiana–Monroe ===
UAB Blazers (1–0) at Louisiana–Monroe Warhawks (1–0) – Game summary

Quarter	1	2	3	4	Total
Blazers	3	3	0	0	6
Warhawks	3	10	9	10	32

at Malone Stadium • Monroe, Louisiana

- Date: September 7th
- Game time: 6:00 p.m. CDT
- Game weather: Cloudy • Temperature: 80 °F (27 °C) • Wind: N at 13 miles per hour (21 km/h)
- Game attendance: 12,327
- Referee: Tim Barker
- TV announcers (ESPN+): Sean Fox (play-by-play) and Desmund Lighten (analyst)

Game information

First quarter

- (9:19) ULM – Max Larson 26 yard field goal (Drive: 8 plays, 24 yards, 4:21; Louisiana–Monroe 3–0)
- (6:34) UAB – Jonah Delange 46 yard field goal (Drive: 10 plays, 48 yards, 2:45; Tied 3–3)

Second quarter

- (14:10) ULM – Ahmad Hardy 16 yard run, Max Larson kick (Drive: 3 plays, 28 yards, 1:06; Louisiana–Monroe 10–3)
- (7:34) UAB – Jonah Delange 26 yard field goal (Drive: 15 plays, 70 yards, 6:30; Louisiana–Monroe 10–6)
- (0:03) ULM – Max Larson 37 yard field goal (Drive: 7 plays, 19 yards, 1:54; Louisiana–Monroe 13–6)

Third quarter

- (10:19) ULM – Team safety (Louisiana–Monroe 15–6)
- (4:52) ULM – Hunter Herring 4 yard run, Max Larson kick (Drive: 9 plays, 61 yards, 5:23; Louisiana–Monroe 22–6)

Fourth quarter

- (10:34) ULM – Car'lin Vigers 30 yard interception return, Max Larson kick (Louisiana–Monroe 29–6)
- (3:36) ULM – Max Larson 40 yard field goal (Drive: 5 plays, 15 yards, 2:09; Louisiana–Monroe 32–6)

Statistics	UAB	ULM
First downs	18	18
Plays–yards	68–259	64–296
Rushes–yards	35–92	48–209
Passing yards	167	87
Passing: Comp–Att–Int	22–32–1	9–16–0
Time of possession	26:45	33:15

Team	Category	Player	Statistics
UAB	Passing	Jacob Zeno	22/32, 167 yards, 1 INT
UAB	Rushing	Lee Beebe Jr.	14 carries, 62 yards
UAB	Receiving	Kam Shanks	4 receptions, 43 yards
Louisiana–Monroe	Passing	General Booty	9/16, 87 yards
Louisiana–Monroe	Rushing	Taven Curry	13 carries, 64 yards
Louisiana–Monroe	Receiving	Nate Sullivan Jr.	2 receptions, 22 yards

=== at Arkansas ===
UAB Blazers (1–1) at Arkansas Razorbacks (1–1) – Game summary

Quarter	1	2	3	4	Total
Blazers	10	10	0	7	27
Razorbacks	3	17	7	10	37

at Donald W. Reynolds Razorback Stadium • Fayetteville, Arkansas

- Date: September 14th
- Game time: 3:15 p.m. CDT
- Game weather: Cloudy • Temperature: 84 °F (29 °C) • Wind: E at 10 miles per hour (16 km/h)
- Game attendance: 75,021
- Referee: Jeff Heaser
- TV announcers (SECN): Dave Neal (play-by-play), Aaron Murray (analyst), Ashley ShahAhmadi (sideline reporter)

Game information

First quarter

- (7:33) UAB – Jonah Delange 27 yard field goal (Drive: 15 plays, 66 yards, 7:27; UAB 3–0)
- (6:05) UAB – Kam Shanks 15 yard pass from Jacob Zeno, Jonah Delange kick (Drive: 2 plays, 15 yards, 0:35; UAB 10–0)
- (4:00) ARK – Kyle Ramsey 28 yard field goal (Drive: 7 plays, 13 yards, 2:01; UAB 10–3)

Second quarter

- (14:51) UAB – Amare Thomas 34 yard pass from Jacob Zeno, Jonah Delange kick (Drive: 8 plays, 75 yards, 4:09; UAB 17–3)
- (9:17) ARK – Braylen Russell 2 yard run, Kyle Ramsey kick (Drive: 12 plays, 75 yards, 5:34; UAB 17–10)
- (4:48) ARK – Taylen Green 14 yard run, Kyle Ramsey kick (Drive: 6 plays, 69 yards, 2:25; Tied 17–17)
- (1:53) UAB – Jonah Delange 23 yard field goal (Drive: 8 plays, 70 yards, 2:55; UAB 20–17)
- (1:03) ARK – Kyle Ramsey 51 yard field goal (Drive: 6 plays, 42 yards, 0:50; Tied 20–20)

Third quarter

- (10:00) ARK – Ja'Quinden Jackson 16 yard run, Kyle Ramsey kick (Drive: 11 plays, 84 yards, 4:56; Arkansas 27–20)

Fourth quarter

- (13:31) ARK – Kyle Ramsey 40 yard field goal (Drive: 7 plays, 66 yards, 3:02; Arkansas 30–20)
- (6:55) UAB – Dallas Payne 21 yard pass from Jacob Zeno, Jonah Delange kick (Drive: 12 plays, 83 yards, 6:33; Arkansas 30–27)
- (3:36) ARK – Taylen Green 9 yard run, Kyle Ramsey kick (Drive: 7 plays, 75 yards, 3:19; Arkansas 37–27)

Statistics	UAB	ARK
First downs	22	29
Plays–yards	67–354	64–427
Rushes–yards	35–119	38–266
Passing yards	235	161
Passing: Comp–Att–Int	23–32–1	11–26–1
Time of possession	32:39	27:21

Team	Category	Player	Statistics
UAB	Passing	Jacob Zeno	23/32, 235 yards, 3 TD, 1 INT
UAB	Rushing	Isaiah Jacobs	15 carries, 62 yards
UAB	Receiving	Amare Thomas	5 receptions, 56 yards, 1 TD
Arkansas	Passing	Taylen Green	11/26, 161 yards, 1 INT
Arkansas	Rushing	Ja'Quinden Jackson	15 carries, 147 yards, 1 TD
Arkansas	Receiving	Andrew Armstrong	8 receptions, 137 yards

=== Navy ===
Navy Midshipmen (3–0) at UAB Blazers (1–2) – Game summary

Quarter	1	2	3	4	Total
Midshipmen	7	14	10	10	41
Blazers	0	3	7	8	18

at Protective Stadium • Birmingham, Alabama

- Date: September 28th
- Game time: 11:00 a.m. CDT
- Game weather: Rain • Temperature: 70 °F (21 °C) • Wind: SW at 10 miles per hour (16 km/h)
- Game attendance: 21,536
- Referee: Charles Lamertina
- TV announcers (ESPN2): Roy Philpott (play-by-play), Sam Acho (analyst) and Taylor Davis (sideline)

Game information

First quarter

- (7:52) NAVY – Blake Horvath 20-yard run, Nathan Kirkwood kick (Drive: 7 plays, 61 yards, 3:33; Navy 7–0)

Second quarter

- (9:01) NAVY – Alex Tecza 6-yard run, Nathan Kirkwood kick (Drive: 14 plays, 84 yards, 7:56; Navy 14–0)
- (1:11) UAB – Jonah Delange 35-yard field goal (Drive: 15 plays, 57 yards, 7:45; Navy 14–3)
- (0:31) NAVY – Nathan Kent 77-yard pass from Blake Horvath, Nathan Kirkwood kick (Drive: 2 plays, 75 yards, 0:40; Navy 21–3)

Third quarter

- (13:36) NAVY – Eli Heidenreich 74-yard pass from Blake Horvath, Nathan Kirkwood kick (Drive: 3 plays, 75 yards, 1:24; Navy 28–3)
- (6:49) NAVY – Nathan Kirkwood 45-yard field goal (Drive: 6 plays, 49 yards, 2:47; Navy 31–3)
- (5:08) UAB – Iverson Hooks 39-yard pass from Jacob Zeno, Jonah Delange kick (Drive: 4 plays, 80 yards, 1:36; Navy 31–10)

Fourth quarter

- (10:32) NAVY – Daba Fofana 16-yard run, Nathan Kirkwood kick (Drive: 8 plays, 94 yards, 4:28; Navy 38–10)
- (9:09) UAB – Lee Beebe Jr., 2-yard run, Kam Shanks pass (Drive: 3 plays, 75 yards, 1:17; Navy 38–18)
- (2:14) NAVY – Nathan Kirkwood 46-yard field goal (Drive: 12 plays, 46 yards, 6:55; Navy 41–18)

Statistics	NAVY	UAB
First downs	22	22
Plays–yards	53–452	66–395
Rushes–yards	42–227	43–193
Passing yards	225	202
Passing: Comp–Att–Int	9–11–0	14–23–2
Time of possession	29:49	30:11

Team	Category	Player	Statistics
Navy	Passing	Blake Horvath	9/11, 225 yards, 2 TD
Navy	Rushing	Blake Horvath	13 carries, 84 yards, TD
Navy	Receiving	Eli Heidenreich	3 receptions, 108 yards, TD
UAB	Passing	Jacob Zeno	14/22, 202 yards, TD, 2 INT
UAB	Rushing	Lee Beebe Jr.	15 carries, 82 yards, TD
UAB	Receiving	Terrell McDonald	1 reception, 67 yards

=== Tulane ===
Tulane Green Wave (3–2) at UAB Blazers (1–3) – Game summary

Quarter	1	2	3	4	Total
Green Wave	20	17	20	14	71
Blazers	6	0	0	14	20

at Protective Stadium • Birmingham, Alabama

- Date: October 5th
- Game time: 12:00 p.m. CDT
- Game weather: Sunny • Temperature: 82 °F (28 °C) • Wind: NE at 5 miles per hour (8.0 km/h)
- Game attendance: 19,724
- Referee: Edwin Lee
- TV announcers (ESPN+): Lowell Galindo (play-by-play), Fozzy Whittaker (analyst) and Smacker Miles (sideline)

Game information

First quarter

- (7:33) TUL – Ty Thompson 3-yard run, Ethan Head kick (Drive: 6 plays, 42 yards, 2:26; Tulane 7–0)
- (4:34) UAB – Jonah Delange 33-yard field goal (Drive: 8 plays, 60 yards, 2:59; Tulane 7–3)
- (4:21) TUL – Rayshawn Pleasant 100-yard kickoff return (Tulane 13–3)
- (3:02) TUL – Makhi Hughes 1-yard run, Ethan Head kick (Drive: 2 plays, 12 yards, 1:05; Tulane 20–3)
- (0:44) UAB – Jonah Delange 32-yard field goal (Drive: 6 plays, 66 yards, 2:13; Tulane 20–6)

Second quarter

- (14:46) TUL – Makhi Hughes 51-yard run, Ethan Head kick (Drive: 3 plays, 65 yards, 0:58; Tulane 27–6)
- (6:24) TUL – Ethan Head 25-yard field goal (Drive: 13 plays, 53 yards, 6:37; Tulane 30–6)
- (1:11) TUL – Arnold Barnes III 1-yard run, Ethan Head kick (Drive: 11 plays, 61 yards, 4:15; Tulane 37–6)

Third quarter

- (11:13) TUL – Yulkeith Brown 14-yard pass from Darian Mensah, Ethan Head kick (Drive: 7 plays, 75 yards, 3:47; Tulane 44–6)
- (5:32) TUL – Yulkeith Brown 22-yard pass from Ty Thompson (Drive: 1 play, 22 yards, 0:06; Tulane 50–6)
- (5:18) TUL – Chris Rodgers 29-yard interception, Jacob Barnes kick (Tulane 57–6)

Fourth quarter

- (13:28) UAB – Amare Thomas 73-yard pass from Jalen Kitna, Jonah Delange kick (Drive: 3 plays, 79 yards, 1:28; Tulane 57–13)
- (8:21) TUL – Arnold Barnes III 14-yard run, Jacob Barnes kick (Drive: 9 plays, 75 yards, 5:07; Tulane 64–13)
- (7:04) TUL – Jamauri McClure 29-yard run, Jacob Barnes kick (Drive: 1 play, 29 yards, 0:09; Tulane 71–13)
- (1:22) UAB – Solomon Beebe 6-yard run, Jonah Delange kick (Drive: 13 plays, 75 yards, 5:42; Tulane 71–20)

Statistics	TULN	UAB
First downs	24	13
Plays–yards	68–497	65–305
Rushes–yards	50–317	22–75
Passing yards	180	230
Passing: Comp–Att–Int	14–18–0	21–43–3
Time of possession	33:27	26:33

Team	Category	Player	Statistics
Tulane	Passing	Darian Mensah	12/15, 134 yards, TD
Tulane	Rushing	Makhi Hughes	15 carries, 119 yards, 2 TD
Tulane	Receiving	Yulkeith Brown	4 receptions, 60 yards, 2 TD
UAB	Passing	Jalen Kitna	20/41, 239 yards, TD, 3 INT
UAB	Rushing	Lee Beebe Jr.	9 carries, 78 yards
UAB	Receiving	Amare Thomas	5 receptions, 98 yards, TD

=== at Army ===
UAB Blazers (1–4) at Army Black Knights (5–0) – Game summary

Quarter	1	2	3	4	Total
Blazers	3	0	0	7	10
Black Knights	20	14	7	3	44

at Michie Stadium • West Point, New York

- Date: October 12th
- Game time: 11:00 a.m. CDT
- Game weather: Sunny
- Game attendance: 29,002
- Referee: Reid Jackson
- TV announcers (CBSSN): Dave Ryan (play-by-play), Adam Breneman (analyst) and Tina Cervasio (sideline reporter)

Game information

First quarter

- (13:38) ARMY – Bryson Daily 29-yard run, Trey Gronotte kick (Drive: 1 play, 34 yards, 0:10; Army 7–0)
- (9:47) UAB – Jonah Delange 51-yard field goal (Drive: 11 plays, 42 yards, 3:51; Army 7–3)
- (5:00) ARMY – Bryson Daily 9-yard run (Drive: 8 plays, 65 yards, 4:47; Army 13–3)
- (2:45) ARMY – Bryson Daily 13-yard run, Trey Gronotte kick (Drive: 3 plays, 37 yards, 1:27; Army 20–3)

Second quarter

- (9:42) ARMY – Kanye Udoh 12-yard run, Trey Gronotte kick (Drive: 10 plays, 73 yards, 6:35; Army 27–3)
- (3:23) ARMY – Casey Reynolds 50-yard pass from Bryson Daily, Trey Gronotte kick (Drive: 4 plays, 95 yards, 2:18; Army 34–3)

Third quarter

- (7:34) ARMY – Bryson Daily 6-yard run, Dawson Jones kick (Drive: 12 plays, 75 yards, 7:26; Army 41–3)

Fourth quarter

- (14:55) ARMY – Trey Gronotte 23-yard field goal (Drive: 11 plays, 50 yards, 6:21; Army 44–3)
- (2:01) UAB – Amare Thomas 8-yard pass from Jalen Kitna, Jonah Delange kick (Drive: 17 plays, 90 yards, 6:43; Army 44–10)

Statistics	UAB	ARMY
First downs	18	28
Plays–yards	63–303	64–515
Rushes–yards	24–61	56–413
Passing yards	242	102
Passing: Comp–Att–Int	25–39–2	3–8–0
Time of possession	24:54	35:06

Team	Category	Player	Statistics
UAB	Passing	Jalen Kitna	25/39, 242 yards, TD, 2 INT
UAB	Rushing	Lee Beebe Jr.	9 carries, 36 yards
UAB	Receiving	Kam Shanks	9 receptions, 119 yards
Army	Passing	Bryson Daily	3/7, 102 yards, TD
Army	Rushing	Bryson Daily	12 carries, 136 yards, 4 TD
Army	Receiving	Casey Reynolds	2 receptions, 84 yards, TD

=== at South Florida ===
UAB Blazers (1–5) at South Florida Bulls (2–4) – Game summary

Quarter	1	2	3	4	Total
Blazers	3	6	10	6	25
Bulls	0	7	13	15	35

at Raymond James Stadium • Tampa, Florida

- Date: October 19th
- Game time: 2:30 p.m. CDT
- Game weather: Cloudy • Temperature: 83 °F (28 °C) • Wind: NE 13 miles per hour (21 km/h)
- Game attendance: 28,154
- Referee: Steve Anderson
- TV announcers (ESPN+): Jason Ross Jr. (play-by-play) and Tyoka Jackson (analyst)

Game information

First quarter

- (6:24) UAB – Jonah Delange 41-yard field goal (Drive: 8 plays, 46 yards, 2:43; UAB 3–0)

Second quarter

- (12:21) USF – Keshaun Singleton 67-yard pass from Bryce Archie, John Cannon kick (Drive: 1 play, 67 yards, 0:09; South Florida 7–3)
- (7:34) UAB – Jonah Delange 29-yard field goal (Drive: 12 plays, 64 yards, 4:47; South Florida 7–6)
- (0:21) UAB – Jonah Delange 32-yard field goal (Drive: 11 plays, 85 yards, 1:32; UAB 9–7)

Third quarter

- (13:45) UAB – Amare Thomas 15-yard pass from Jalen Kitna, Jonah Delange kick (Drive: 3 plays, 65 yards, 1:15; UAB 16–7)
- (10:12) UAB – Jonah Delange 48-yard field goal (Drive: 4 plays, 2 yards, 1:06; UAB 19–7)
- (6:25) USF – Ta'Ron Keith 4-yard run, John Cannon kick (Drive: 9 plays, 65 yards, 3:40; UAB 19–14)
- (3:51) USF – Kelley Joiner 10-yard pass from Bryce Archie (Drive: 4 plays, 18 yards, 1:11; South Florida 20–19)

Fourth quarter

- (11:46) UAB – Amare Thomas 7-yard pass from Jalen Kitna, Jonah Delange kick (Drive: 11 plays, 70 yards, 4:55; UAB 25–20)
- (6:17) USF – Kelley Joiner 1-yard run, Michael Brown-Stephens pass (Drive: 3 plays, 16 yards, 0:27; South Florida 28–25)
- (2:55) USF – Kelley Joiner 33-yard run, John Cannon kick (Drive: 3 plays, 36 yards, 1:35; South Florida 35–25)

Statistics	UAB	USF
First downs	26	18
Plays–yards	90–485	73–355
Rushes–yards	34–101	41–154
Passing yards	384	201
Passing: Comp–Att–Int	33–56–1	17–32–1
Time of possession	34:35	25:18

Team	Category	Player	Statistics
UAB	Passing	Jalen Kitna	33/56, 384 yards, 2 TD, INT
UAB	Rushing	Lee Beebe Jr.	18 carries, 68 yards
UAB	Receiving	Amare Thomas	8 receptions, 97 yards, 2 TD
South Florida	Passing	Bryce Archie	17/31, 201 yards, 2 TD, INT
South Florida	Rushing	Kelley Joiner	15 carries, 94 yards, 2 TD
South Florida	Receiving	Keshaun Singleton	4 receptions, 105 yards, TD

=== Tulsa ===
Tulsa Golden Hurricane (3–5) at UAB Blazers (1–6) – Game summary

Quarter	1	2	3	4	Total
Golden Hurricane	0	7	7	7	21
Blazers	21	24	14	0	59

at Protective Stadium • Birmingham, Alabama

- Date: November 2nd
- Game time: 12:30 p.m. CDT
- Game weather: Cloudy • Temperature: 75 °F (24 °C) • Wind: W 4 miles per hour (6.4 km/h)
- Game attendance: 17,944
- Referee: Charles Lamertina
- TV announcers (ESPN+): Courtney Lyle (play-by-play), Leger Douzable (analyst) and Smacker Miles (sideline)

Game information

First quarter

- (12:44) UAB – Armoni Goodwin 20-yard pass from Harrison Barker, Jonah Delange kick (Drive: 5 plays, 75 yards, 2:16; UAB 7–0)
- (8:51) UAB – Bryce Damous 14-yard pass from Jalen Kitna, Jonah Delange kick (Drive: 6 plays, 47 yards, 2:59; UAB 14–0)
- (3:13) UAB – Amare Thomas 16-yard pass from Jalen Kitna, Jonah Delange kick (Drive: 2 plays, 17 yards, 0:44; UAB 21–0)

Second quarter

- (14:50) UAB – Kam Shanks 67-yard pass from Jalen Kitna, Jonah Delange kick (Drive: 5 plays, 73 yards, 1:36; UAB 28–0)
- (9:07) UAB – Jonah Delange 52-yard field goal (Drive: 6 plays, 17 yards, 2:25; UAB 31–0)
- (7:30) UAB – Kam Shanks 58-yard punt return, Jonah Delange kick (UAB 38–0)
- (2:25) UAB – Amare Thomas 15-yard pass from Jalen Kitna, Jonah Delange kick (Drive: 7 plays, 70 yards, 3:40; UAB 45–0)
- (0:17) TLSA – Joseph Williams 13-yard pass from Cooper Legas, Seth Morgan kick (Drive: 7 plays, 50 yards, 0:43; UAB 45–7)

Third quarter

- (8:47) TLSA – Bill Jackson 16-yard pass from Cooper Legas, Seth Morgan kick (Drive: 16 plays, 75 yards, 6:13; UAB 45–14)
- (7:30) UAB – Kam Shanks 34-yard pass from Jalen Kitna, Jonah Delange kick (Drive: 3 plays, 55 yards, 1:07; UAB 52–14)
- (1:00) UAB – Kam Shanks 48-yard pass from Jalen Kitna, Jonah Delange kick (Drive: 8 plays, 84 yards, 3:55; UAB 59–14)

Fourth quarter

- (0:24) TLSA – Corey Smith 6-yard pass from Tim Carpenter, Seth Morgan kick (Drive: 8 plays, 76 yards, 1:25; UAB 59–21)

Statistics	TLSA	UAB
First downs	24	23
Plays–yards	90–423	60–537
Rushes–yards	49–187	23–113
Passing yards	236	424
Passing: Comp–Att–Int	22–41–1	27–37–0
Time of possession	31:50	28:10

Team	Category	Player	Statistics
Tulsa	Passing	Cooper Legas	21/38, 230 yards, 2 TD, INT
Tulsa	Rushing	Viron Ellison Jr.	12 carries, 73 yards
Tulsa	Receiving	Joseph Williams	6 receptions, 112 yards, TD
UAB	Passing	Jalen Kitna	25/32, 404 yards, 6 TD
UAB	Rushing	Lee Beebe Jr.	10 carries, 34 yards
UAB	Receiving	Kam Shanks	5 receptions, 153 yards, 3 TD

=== UConn ===
UConn Huskies (6–3) at UAB Blazers (2–6) – Game summary

Quarter	1	2	3	4	Total
Huskies	3	0	7	21	31
Blazers	3	17	3	0	23

at Protective Stadium • Birmingham, Alabama

- Date: November 9th
- Game time: 1:30 p.m. CST
- Game weather: Temperature: 76 °F (24 °C) • Wind: SE at 8 miles per hour (13 km/h) • Weather: Rainy
- Game attendance: 18,351
- Referee: Tim Hedgepeth
- TV announcers (ESPN+): James Westling (play-by-play), Leger Douzable (analyst) and Maria Trivelpiece (sideline)

Game information

First quarter

- UAB - Delange, Jonah 20 yd field goal, 9:25. Blazers 3–0. Drive: 14 plays, 73 yards, TOP 05:35
- CONN - Freeman, Chris 26 yd field goal, 3:19. Tied 3–3. Drive: 13 plays, 57 yards, TOP 06:06

Second quarter

- UAB - Delange, Jonah 36 yd field goal, 13:07. Blazers 6–3. Drive: 7 plays, 43 yards, TOP 01:53
- UAB - Milliner, Corri 38 yd pass from Kitna, Jalen (Delange, Jonah kick), 7:02. Blazers 13–3. Drive: 8 plays, 76 yards, TOP 04:12
- UAB - Beebe Jr., Lee 25 yd run (Delange, Jonah kick), 0:20. Blazers 20–3. Drive: 5 plays, 42 yards, TOP 01:37

Third quarter

- CONN - Robinson, Durell 1 yd run (Freeman, Chris kick), 7:57. Blazers 20–10. Drive: 15 plays, 75 yards, TOP 07:03
- UAB - Delange, Jonah 32 yd field goal, 3:49. Blazers 23–10. Drive: 9 plays, 61 yards, TOP 04:08

Fourth quarter

- CONN - Porter, Shamar 6 yd pass from Fagnano, Joe (Freeman, Chris kick), 8:45. Blazers 23–17. Drive: 8 plays, 58 yards, TOP 01:14
- CONN - Gathings, Jasaiah 21 yd pass from Fagnano, Joe (Freeman, Chris kick), 8:28. Huskies 24–23. Drive: 2 plays, 21 yards, TOP 00:14
- CONN - Edwards, Cam 48 yd run (Freeman, Chris kick), 2:39. Huskies 31–23. Drive: 4 plays, 59 yards, TOP 02:15

Statistics	CONN	UAB
First downs	20	23
Plays–yards	76–365	76–403
Rushes–yards	40–189	33–170
Passing yards	176	233
Passing: Comp–Att–Int	20–36–1	22–43–2
Time of possession	30:27	29:33

Team	Category	Player	Statistics
UConn	Passing	Nick Evers	15/24, 104 yards, INT
UConn	Rushing	Cam Edwards	11 carries, 82 yards, TD
UConn	Receiving	Jasaiah Gathings	6 receptions, 52 yards, TD
UAB	Passing	Jalen Kitna	22/42, 233 yards, TD, 2 INT
UAB	Rushing	Lee Beebe Jr.	17 carries, 115 yards, TD
UAB	Receiving	Amare Thomas	6 receptions, 88 yards

=== at Memphis ===
UAB Blazers (2–7) at Memphis Tigers (8–2) – Game summary

Quarter	1	2	3	4	Total
Blazers	0	8	3	7	18
Tigers	11	7	7	28	53

at Simmons Bank Liberty Stadium • Memphis, Tennessee

- Date: November 16th
- Game time: 7:00 p.m. CST
- Game weather: Clear • Temperature: 54 °F (12 °C) • Wind: SE 3 miles per hour (4.8 km/h)
- Game attendance: 24,225
- Referee: Edwin Lee
- TV announcers (ESPN2): Brian Custer (play-by-play), Rod Gilmore (analyst) and Tori Petry (sideline)

Game information

First quarter

- (11:38) MEM – Brandon Thomas 2-yard run, Colby Cox pass (Drive: 7 plays, 75 yards, 3:22; Memphis 8–0)
- (3:43) MEM – Tristian Vandenberg 41-yard field goal (Drive: 10 plays, 67 yards, 4:42; Memphis 11–0)

Second quarter

- (6:34) MEM – Anthony Landphere 10-yard pass from Seth Henigan, Tristian Vandenberg kick (Drive: 9 plays, 53 yards, 3:43; Memphis 18–0)
- (1:55) UAB – Kam Shanks 10-yard pass from Jalen Kitna, Terrell McDonald rush (Drive: 10 plays, 70 yards, 4:39; Memphis 18–8)

Third quarter

- (10:57) MEM – Greg Desrosiers Jr. 19-yard pass from Seth Henigan, Tristian Vandenberg kick (Drive: 6 plays, 45 yards, 2:38; Memphis 25–8)
- (6:37) UAB – Jonah Delange 32-yard field goal (Drive: 10 plays, 61 yards, 4:20; Memphis 25–11)

Fourth quarter

- (14:56) MEM – Anthony Landphere 2-yard pass from Seth Henigan, Tristian Vandenberg kick (Drive: 12 plays, 75 yards, 6:41; Memphis 32–11)
- (13:23) UAB – Terrell McDonald 1-yard run, Jonah Delange kick (Drive: 4 plays, 75 yards, 1:33; Memphis 32–18)
- (10:13) MEM – Anthony Landphere 10-yard pass from Seth Henigan, Tristian Vandenberg kick (Drive: 6 plays, 67 yards, 3:03; Memphis 39–18)
- (4:57) MEM – Mario Anderson Jr. 11-yard run, Tristian Vandenberg kick (Drive: 8 plays, 66 yards, 4:05; Memphis 46–18)
- (0:43) MEM – Harris Boyd 4-yard run, Tristian Vandenberg kick (Drive: 4 plays, 21 yards, 1:47; Memphis 53–18)

Statistics	UAB	MEM
First downs	16	31
Plays–yards	64–352	74–526
Rushes–yards	20–28	40–227
Passing yards	324	299
Passing: Comp–Att–Int	28–44–2	23–34–0
Time of possession	25:37	34:23

Team	Category	Player	Statistics
UAB	Passing	Jalen Kitna	27/43, 253 yards, TD, 2 INT
UAB	Rushing	Lee Beebe Jr.	12 carries, 42 yards
UAB	Receiving	Corri Milliner	3 receptions, 74 yards
Memphis	Passing	Seth Henigan	23/34, 299 yards, 4 TD
Memphis	Rushing	Mario Anderson Jr.	22 carries, 138 yards, TD
Memphis	Receiving	Koby Drake	3 receptions, 56 yards

=== Rice ===
Rice Owls (3–7) at UAB Blazers (2–8) – Game summary

Quarter	1	2	3	4	Total
Owls	14	0	0	0	14
Blazers	14	13	0	13	40

at Protective Stadium • Birmingham, Alabama

- Date: November 23rd
- Game time: 1:00 p.m. CST
- Game weather: Sunny, 60 °F (16 °C)
- Game attendance: 16,181
- Referee: Darryl DeBerry
- TV announcers (ESPN+): Justin Kutcher (play-by-play) and Dave Steckel (analyst)

Game information

First quarter

- (10:28) RIC – Dean Connors 5-yard run, Tim Horn kick (Drive: 4 plays, 82 yards, 1:51; Rice 7–0)
- (10:10) UAB – Malachi Holt-Bennett 5-yard pass from Jalen Kitna, Jonah Delange kick (Drive: 1 play, 5 yards, 0:05; Tied 7–7)
- (5:28) UAB – Lee Beebe Jr. 48-yard run, Jonah Delange kick (Drive: 7 plays, 80 yards, 3:03; UAB 14–7)
- (3:05) RIC – Colin Giffen 5-yard pass from E. J. Warner, Tim Horn kick (Drive: 1 play, 5 yards, 0:03; Tied 14–14)

Second quarter

- (12:50) UAB – Jonah Delange 32-yard field goal (Drive: 10 plays, 61 yards, 5:15; UAB 17–14)
- (1:45) UAB – Jonah Delange 43-yard field goal (Drive: 4 plays, -2 yards, 0:41; UAB 20–14)
- (0:00) UAB – Adrian Maddox 99-yard interception, Jonah Delange kick (UAB 27–14)

Third quarter

No scoring plays

Fourth quarter

- (11:01) UAB – Lee Beebe Jr. 7-yard run (Drive: 13 plays, 94 yards, 7:28; UAB 33–14)
- (7:42) UAB – Corri Milliner 45-yard pass from Jalen Kitna, Jonah Delange kick (Drive: 1 play, 45 yards, 0:08; UAB 40–14)

Statistics	RICE	UAB
First downs	18	21
Plays–yards	74–337	57–364
Rushes–yards	25–115	34–190
Passing yards	222	174
Passing: Comp–Att–Int	28–49–3	18–23–0
Time of possession	30:44	29:16

Team	Category	Player	Statistics
Rice	Passing	E. J. Warner	28/49, 222 yards, TD, 3 INT
Rice	Rushing	Dean Connors	16 carries, 62 yards, TD
Rice	Receiving	Braylen Walker	2 receptions, 54 yards
UAB	Passing	Jalen Kitna	18/23, 174 yards, 2 TD
UAB	Rushing	Lee Beebe Jr.	16 carries, 161 yards, 2 TD
UAB	Receiving	Corri Milliner	6 receptions, 90 yards, TD

=== at Charlotte ===
UAB Blazers (3–8) at Charlotte 49ers (4–7) – Game summary

Quarter	1	2	3	4	Total
Blazers	0	14	0	13	27
49ers	7	6	6	10	29

at Jerry Richardson Stadium • Charlotte, North Carolina

- Date: November 30th
- Game time: 2:30 p.m. CST
- Game weather: Clear • Temperature: 46 °F (8 °C) • Wind: W 6 miles per hour (9.7 km/h)
- Game attendance: 8,091
- Referee: Steven Anderson
- TV announcers (ESPN+): Noah Frary (play-by-play), Reggie Walker (analyst) and Savanna Collins (sideline)

Game information

First quarter

- (5:12) CLT – Hahsaun Wilson 7-yard run, Kyle Cunanan kick (Drive: 7 plays, 59 yards, 2:33; Charlotte 7-0)

Second quarter

- (12:08) UAB – Kam Shanks 12-yard pass from Jalen Kitna, Jonah Delange kick (Drive: 7 plays, 60 yards, 2:56; Tied 7-7)
- (1:56) CLT – Kyle Cunanan 21-yard field goal (Drive: 9 plays, 85 yards, TOP 04:40; Charlotte 10-7)
- (0:20) UAB – Corri Milliner 26-yard pass from Jalen Kitna, Jonah Delange kick (Drive: 8 plays, 71 yards, 1:28; UAB 14-10)
- (0:00) CLT – Kyle Cunanan 30-yard field goal (Drive: 4 plays, 62 yards, 0:20; UAB 14-13)

Third quarter

- (4:29) CLT – Cartevious Norton 1-yard run (Drive: 7 plays, 80 yards, 3:12; Charlotte 19-14)

Fourth quarter

- (14:20) UAB – Lee Beebe Jr. 11-yard pass from Jalen Kitna (Drive: 10 plays, 65 yards, 5:09; UAB 20-19)
- (9:29) CLT – Kyle Cunanan 31-yard field goal (Drive: 9 plays, 61 yards, 4:51; Charlotte 22-20)
- (5:12) CLT – O'Mega Blake 46-yard pass from Deshawn Purdie, Kyle Cunanan kick (Drive: 4 plays, 57 yards, 1:35; Charlotte 29-20)
- (2:57) UAB – Lee Beebe Jr. 1-yard run, Jonah Delange kick (Drive: 5 plays, 70 yards, 2:10; Charlotte 29-27)

Statistics	UAB	CLT
First downs	27	19
Plays–yards	63–437	44–355
Rushes–yards	35–128	35–140
Passing yards	309	215
Passing: Comp–Att–Int	28–42–1	9–26–0
Time of possession	34:17	25:43

Team	Category	Player	Statistics
UAB	Passing	Jalen Kitna	26/40, 280 yards, 3 TD, INT
UAB	Rushing	Lee Beebe Jr.	19 carries, 82 yards, TD
UAB	Receiving	Corri Milliner	7 receptions, 126 yards, TD
Charlotte	Passing	Deshawn Purdie	9-26, 215 yards, TD
Charlotte	Rushing	Hahsaun Wilson	14 carries, 84 yards, TD
Charlotte	Receiving	Sean Brown	5 receptions, 100 yards

== Personnel ==
=== NFL departures ===
One Blazer was selected in the 2024 NFL draft.

Player	Position	Team	Round	Pick
Tejhaun Palmer	WR	Arizona Cardinals	6	191

=== Outgoing transfers ===
Player	Position	Destination
Samario Rudolph	WR	Jacksonville State
Jackson Bratton	LB	North Alabama
A.D. Diamond	CB	Unknown
Jalen Nettles	IOL	Southeast Missouri State
Damon Miller	S	Samford
Joey Merritt	WR	San Diego
Xander Echols	LS	Idaho
Jamin Graham	DL	Unknown
Teddy Davenport	WR	Samford
Cort Bradley	IOL	Unknown
Carl Fauntroy	S	Louisiana–Monroe
Connor Knight	DL	McNeese
Fred Farrier II	WR	Kentucky
Elijah Williams	DL	Unknown
Taven Curry	RB	Louisiana–Monroe
BJ Mayes	CB	Texas A&M
Jalen Mayala	EDGE	Unknown
Reise Collier	LB	Ohio
TJ Jones	WR	Withdrawn
Jamarcus Jones	LB	Louisiana Tech
Tyler Thomas	DL	South Alabama
Guerlens Milfort	DL	Unknown
Colby Dempsey	CB	Withdrawn
Mac McWilliams	CB	UCF
Dazalin Worsham	WR	West Georgia
Jamoi Mayes	WR	Cincinnati

=== Incoming transfers ===
Player	Position	Previous team
Jalen Kitna	QB	Florida
OC Brothers	LB	Purdue
LeDarrius Cox	DL	Indiana
DJ Jones	OT	Murray State
Adrian Maddox	CB	Alabama State
JonDarius Morgan	IOL	South Carolina
Armoni Goodwin	RB	LSU
Jamoi Mayes	WR	Chattanooga
Ezra Odinjor	EDGE	Georgia Tech
Sirad Bryant	QB	Georgia Tech
Jax Van Zandt	LB	North Texas
Troy Jakubec	S	Youngstown State
Derrick Shepard Jr.	DL	Cincinnati
Donald Lee	CB	Grambling State
Tyjon Jones	S	Youngstown State
Baron Franks II	IOL	Norfolk State
Demarcus Smith	DL	Ole Miss
Tariq Watson	CB	Minnesota
Jack Nickel	TE	Michigan State
Calib Perez	OT	Duke
