= Caleb Ransaw =

American football player (born 2002)

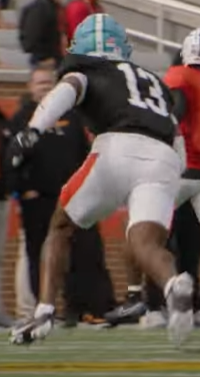
- Ransaw at the 2025 Senior Bowl

No. 27 – Jacksonville Jaguars
- Position: Safety
- Roster status: Injured reserve

Personal information
- Born: December 22, 2002 (age 23); Harvest, Alabama, U.S.
- Listed height: 6 ft 0 in (1.83 m)
- Listed weight: 196 lb (89 kg)

Career information
- High school: Sparkman (Harvest)
- College: Troy (2021–2023); Tulane (2024)
- NFL draft: 2025: 3rd round, 88th overall pick

Career history
- Jacksonville Jaguars (2025–present)

Awards and highlights
- Third-team All-AAC (2024)

Career NFL statistics as of Week 7, 2026
- Total tackles: 10
- Stats at Pro Football Reference

Caleb Ransaw (born December 22, 2002) is an American professional football safety for the Jacksonville Jaguars of the National Football League (NFL). He played college football for the Troy Trojans and Tulane Green Wave and was selected by the Jaguars in the third round of the 2025 NFL draft.

== Early life ==
Ransaw was born on December 22, 2002 to Justin Ransaw and Ashanta Lindsey in Harvest, Alabama. He attended Sparkman High School in his hometown of Harvest and committed to play college football for the Troy Trojans.

== College career ==
=== Troy ===
In his first two seasons with the Trojans in 2021 and 2022, Ransaw appeared in 21 games and totaled 30 tackles and three pass deflections. In 2023, he became a full-time starter and totaled 51 tackles with six being for a loss, two pass deflections, and an interception, earning honorable mention all-Sun Belt Conference. After the season, Ransaw entered his name into the NCAA transfer portal.

=== Tulane ===
Ransaw transferred to play for the Tulane Green Wave. In week 9 of the 2024 season, he notched five tackles with two being for a loss, and a pass deflection in a win over North Texas Mean Green. Ransaw finished his lone season with the Green Wave with 33 tackles with four being for a loss, a sack, and three pass deflections. He also allowed just 11 catches on 24 targets in 265 coverage snaps. After the season, Ransaw declared for the 2025 NFL draft and accepted an invite to play in both the 2025 Reese's Senior Bowl and the 2025 East-West Shrine Bowl. In the Senior Bowl, he recorded an interception in the end zone off of quarterback Tyler Shough which he returned 27 yards.

== Professional career ==
Pre-draft measurables
Height	Weight	Arm length	Hand span	Wingspan	40-yard dash	10-yard split	20-yard split	20-yard shuttle	Three-cone drill	Vertical jump	Broad jump	Bench press
5 ft 11 3/8 in (1.81 m)	197 lb (89 kg)	30 3/4 in (0.78 m)	9 3/4 in (0.25 m)	6 ft 3 5/8 in (1.92 m)	4.33 s	1.52 s	2.50 s	4.34 s	6.93 s	40.0 in (1.02 m)	10 ft 9 in (3.28 m)	16 reps
All values from NFL Combine/Pro Day

Ransaw was selected in the third round, with the 88th pick of the 2025 NFL draft by the Jacksonville Jaguars.

== Personal life ==
Ransaw's cousin is former Alabama and NFL cornerback Dre Kirkpatrick. He is a barber in his spare time.
