= Micah Robinson =

American football player (born 2002)

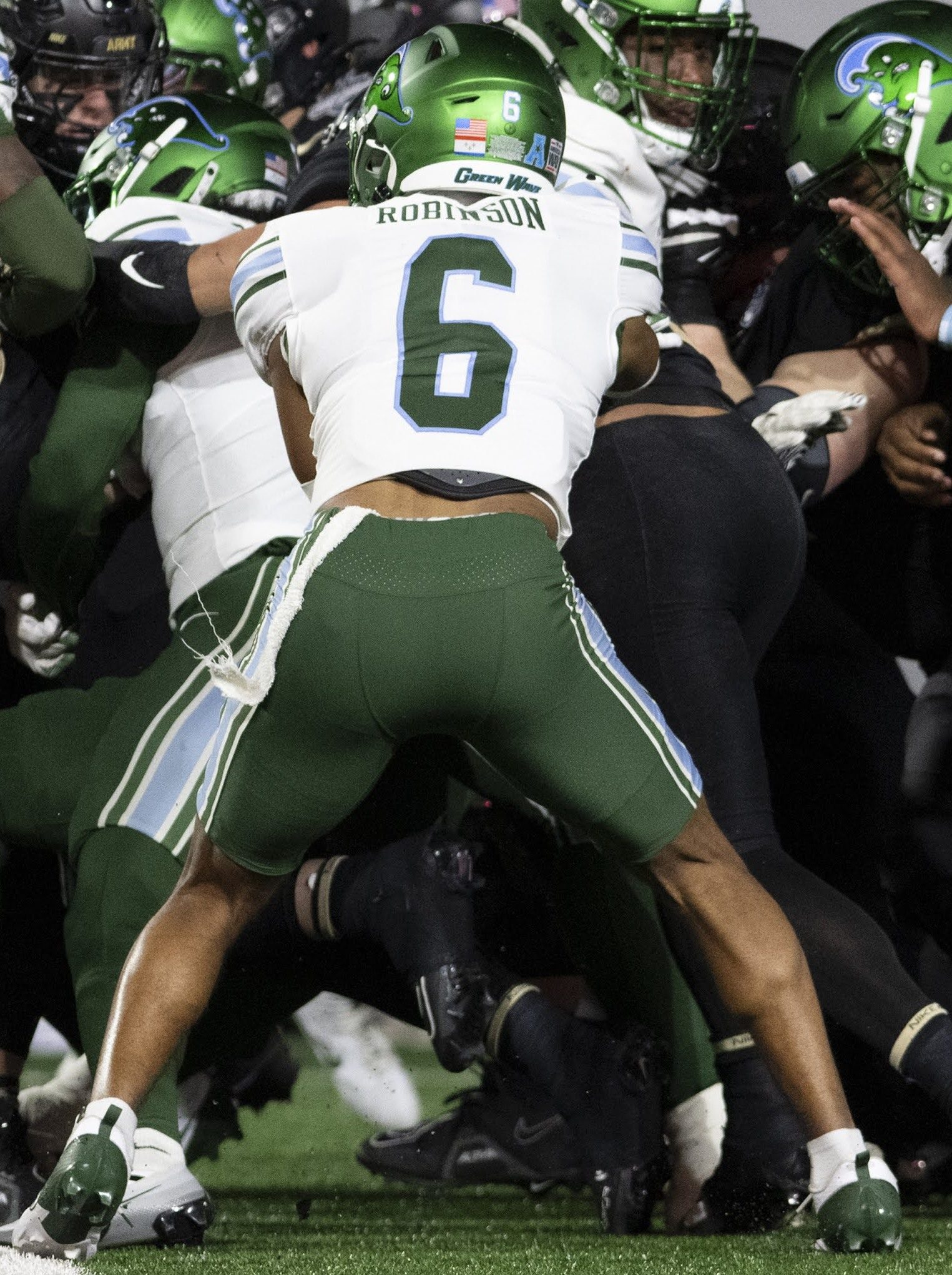

No. 21 – Tennessee Titans
- Position: Cornerback
- Roster status: Active

Personal information
- Born: February 5, 2002 (age 24); Atlanta, Georgia, U.S.
- Listed height: 5 ft 11 in (1.80 m)
- Listed weight: 186 lb (84 kg)

Career information
- High school: Westlake (South Fulton, Georgia)
- College: Furman (2020–2023); Tulane (2024)
- NFL draft: 2025: 7th round, 237th overall pick

Career history
- Green Bay Packers (2025); Tennessee Titans (2025–present)

Awards and highlights
- Second-team All-AAC (2024)

Career NFL statistics as of Week 7, 2026
- Total tackles: 29
- Pass deflections: 2
- Stats at Pro Football Reference

Micah Mekhi Robinson (born February 5, 2002) is an American professional football cornerback for the Tennessee Titans of the National Football League (NFL). He played college football for the Furman Paladins and Tulane Green Wave and was selected by the Green Bay Packers in the seventh round of the 2025 NFL draft.

== Early life ==
Robinson was born on February 5, 2002, in Atlanta, Georgia. He grew up in Atlanta and attended Westlake High School in South Fulton. He played football at Westlake as a cornerback and return specialist, serving as team captain as a senior while helping them reach the state playoffs. He was the team leader in interceptions as a junior and senior, concluding his high school career with eight, and was named an all-region selection as a senior. He also competed in track and field at Westlake, and he graduated from the school in 2020. He committed to play college football for the Furman Paladins.

== College career ==
Robinson began playing for the Paladins in 2020. After appearing as a backup and totaling four tackles in 2020, he began seeing action as a starter in 2021. He totaled 34 tackles in 2021, 35 in 2022, and 34 again in 2023, also posting five interceptions during this time, with a career-high three in 2022. Following four seasons at Furman, he transferred to the Tulane Green Wave for a final season in 2024, concluding his tenure with the Paladins having appeared in 42 games, with 103 tackles and 21 pass breakups. With Tulane in 2024, he started all 14 games while totaling 34 tackles, six passes defended and two interceptions, returning one for a touchdown. He allowed only one touchdown to be scored on him and was named second-team All-American Athletic Conference (AAC) for his performance.

== Professional career ==
Pre-draft measurables
Height	Weight	Arm length	Hand span	40-yard dash	10-yard split	20-yard split	20-yard shuttle	Three-cone drill	Vertical jump	Broad jump	Bench press
5 ft 10 7/8 in (1.80 m)	183 lb (83 kg)	30 7/8 in (0.78 m)	8 3/4 in (0.22 m)	4.42 s	1.52 s	2.55 s	4.55 s	7.14 s	35.0 in (0.89 m)	10 ft 3 in (3.12 m)	14 reps
All values from Pro Day

=== Green Bay Packers ===
Robinson was not invited to the NFL Scouting Combine, but posted a 40-yard dash time of 4.42 seconds at his pro day. He was selected by the Green Bay Packers in the seventh round (237th overall) of the 2025 NFL draft, with the pick being announced by YouTuber Tom Grossi. On May 2, 2025, he signed his rookie contract with the Packers. He was waived on August 27, 2025, and re-signed to the practice squad. He was elevated to the active roster for week 2 of the 2025 season.

=== Tennessee Titans ===
On October 27, 2025, Robinson was signed off of the Packers practice squad by the Tennessee Titans following the trade of Roger McCreary to the Los Angeles Rams. Robinson made his NFL debut on November 2, 2025 against the Los Angeles Chargers.
