= 2024 American Athletic Conference football season =

- League: NCAA Division I Football Bowl Subdivision
- Sport: Football
- Duration: August 31, 2024–December 14, 2024
- Teams: 14
- TV partner(s): ABC, ESPN, ESPN2, ESPNU, and CBS Sports Network

2025 NFL draft
- Top draft pick: Shavon Revel, CB, East Carolina
- Picked by: Dallas Cowboys, 76th overall

Regular season
- Season champions: Army
- Runners-up: Tulane

AAC Championship Game
- Champions: Army
- Runners-up: Tulane
- Finals MVP: Bryson Daily (QB, Army)

Seasons
- ← 2023 2025 →

2024 American Athletic Conference football standings
	Conf.			Overall
Team	W		L	W		L
No. 21 Army y$	8	–	0	12	–	2
Tulane y	7	–	1	9	–	5
Navy	6	–	2	10	–	3
No. 24 Memphis	6	–	2	11	–	2
East Carolina	5	–	3	8	–	5
South Florida	4	–	4	7	–	6
UTSA	4	–	4	7	–	6
Charlotte	4	–	4	5	–	7
North Texas	3	–	5	6	–	7
Rice	3	–	5	4	–	8
Temple	2	–	6	3	–	9
UAB	2	–	6	3	–	9
Florida Atlantic	1	–	7	3	–	9
Tulsa	1	–	7	3	–	9
Championship: Army 35, Tulane 14
$ – Conference champion; y – Championship game participant; Rankings from AP Poll

The 2024 American Athletic Conference football season was the 33rd NCAA Division I FBS Football season of the American Athletic Conference, now known as the American Conference (The American), the 12th and last under its then-current name after the breakup of the former Big East Conference (whose charter legally belongs to The American), and the 10th season of the College Football Playoff in place. The American is considered a member of the Group of Five (G5) together with Conference USA, the MAC, Mountain West Conference and the Sun Belt Conference. The conference had 14 football members for the 2024–25 season.

The conference changed its name to "American Conference" on July 21, 2025.

== Conference realignment ==
Prior to the 2024 season, The American saw the departure of one team and the arrival of another. SMU, the 2023 Conference champions, left The American to join the Atlantic Coast Conference. Army joined The American as a football-only member beginning in 2024 after having played as an independent school in football since 2005. The conference will remain at 14 football members following these moves.

Though Army and Navy are now members of American Conference football, the annual Army–Navy Game will be played as a non-conference game to ensure that its traditional date of the second weekend of December will remain.

== Head coaches ==
=== Changes ===
- On December 3, 2023, Tulane head coach Willie Fritz resigned from his position to take the head coach position at Houston in the Big 12 Conference for the 2024 season. Offensive coordinator and quarterbacks coach Slade Nagle was named the interim head coach. On December 8, Jon Sumrall was announced as Tulane's new head coach for 2024. Sumrall had previously been the head coach at Troy.

=== Records ===
Team	Head coach	Years at school	Overall record	Record at school	AAC record
Army	Jeff Monken	11	106–71 (.599)	70–55 (.560)	0–0 (–)
Charlotte	Biff Poggi	2	3–9 (.250)	3–9 (.250)	2–6 (.250)
East Carolina	Mike Houston	6	103–58 (.640)	24–34 (.414)	14–26 (.350)
Florida Atlantic	Tom Herman	2	58–30 (.659)	4–8 (.333)	3–5 (.375)
Memphis	Ryan Silverfield	5	31–19 (.620)	31–19 (.620)	17–15 (.531)
Navy	Brian Newberry	2	5–7 (.417)	5–7 (.417)	4–4 (.500)
North Texas	Eric Morris	2	29–25 (.537)	5–7 (.417)	3–5 (.375)
Rice	Mike Bloomgren	7	22–46 (.324)	22–46 (.324)	4–4 (.500)
South Florida	Alex Golesh	2	7–6 (.538)	7–6 (.538)	4–4 (.500)
Temple	Stan Drayton	3	6–18 (.250)	6–18 (.250)	2–14 (.125)
Tulane	Jon Sumrall	1	23–4 (.852)	0–0 (–)	0–0 (–)
Tulsa	Kevin Wilson	2	30–55 (.353)	4–8 (.333)	2–6 (.250)
UAB	Trent Dilfer	2	4–8 (.333)	4–8 (.333)	3–5 (.375)
UTSA	Jeff Traylor	5	39–14 (.736)	39–14 (.736)	7–1 (.875)

Note:

- Records shown after the 2023 season
- Years at school includes 2024 season

=== Mid-season changes ===
- On October 20, East Carolina announced that they had fired head coach Mike Houston, citing that changes were needed to "move the program forward". Defensive coordinator Blake Harrell was named the interim head coach. Harrell was promoted to the permanent head coach on November 25.
- On October 27, Rice announced that they had fired head coach Mike Bloomgren. Bloomgren had posted a 24–52 record with the school during his tenure. Associate head coach Pete Alamar was named the interim head coach for the remainder of the season. On November 26, Rice announced the Scott Abell would be the new head coach for the 2025 season. Abell was previously head coach at Davidson
- On November 17, Temple announced that they had fired head coach Stan Drayton. Drayton had posted a 9–25 record in 3 years with the school. Defensive coordinator Everett Withers was named the interim head coach for the remainder of the season. On December 1, Temple announced K. C. Keeler as the new head coach. Keeler had previously been head coach at Sam Houston.
- On November 18, Florida Atlantic announced that they had fired head coach Tom Herman. Associate head coach Chad Lunsford was named the interim head coach for the remainder of the season. On December 2, Florida Atlantic announced Zach Kittley as the new head coach. Kittley had previously been the offensive coordinator at Texas Tech.
- On November 18, Charlotte announced that they had fired head coach Biff Poggi after less than two seasons at the school. Associate head coach Tim Brewster was named the interim head coach for the remainder of the season. On December 7, Charlotte announced Tim Albin as the new head coach for 2024. Albin had previously been head coach of Ohio.
- On November 24, Tulsa announced they had fired head coach Kevin Wilson. Wide receivers coach Ryan Switzer was named the interim head coach for the final game of the season. On December 8, Tulsa announced Tre Lamb as the new head coach for 2025. Lamb had previously been head coach at East Tennessee State.

== Rankings ==
		Pre	Wk 1	Wk 2	Wk 3	Wk 4	Wk 5	Wk 6	Wk 7	Wk 8	Wk 9	Wk 10	Wk 11	Wk 12	Wk 13	Wk 14	Wk 15	Final
Army	AP							RV	23	23	21	18	16	18	25	24	19	21
Army	C							RV	24	23	21	19	17	17	22	23	18	21
Army	CFP	Not released										25	24	19		24	22	
Charlotte	AP																	
Charlotte	C																	
Charlotte	CFP	Not released																
East Carolina	AP																	
East Carolina	C																	
East Carolina	CFP	Not released																
Florida Atlantic	AP																	
Florida Atlantic	C																	
Florida Atlantic	CFP	Not released																
Memphis	AP	RV	RV	RV	RV						RV			RV	RV	25	25	24
Memphis	C	RV	RV	25	23				RV	RV	25	RV	RV	24	23	24	23	23
Memphis	CFP	Not released														25	25	
Navy	AP						RV	RV	25	24	RV							RV
Navy	C						RV	RV	RV	24	RV		RV					RV
Navy	CFP	Not released																
North Texas	AP																	
North Texas	C																	
North Texas	CFP	Not released																
Rice	AP																	
Rice	C																	
Rice	CFP	Not released																
South Florida	AP																	
South Florida	C		RV		RV													
South Florida	CFP	Not released																
Temple	AP																	
Temple	C																	
Temple	CFP	Not released																
Tulane	AP	RV	RV								RV	RV	25	20	18	RV	RV	
Tulane	C	RV	RV	RV				RV	RV	RV	RV	RV	RV	20	18	RV	RV	
Tulane	CFP	Not released											25	20	17			
Tulsa	AP																	
Tulsa	C																	
Tulsa	CFP	Not released																
UAB	AP																	
UAB	C																	
UAB	CFP	Not released																
UTSA	AP	RV	RV															
UTSA	C	RV	RV															
UTSA	CFP	Not released																

Legend
	Improvement in ranking
	Drop in ranking
	Not ranked previous week
	No change in ranking from previous week
RV	Received votes but were not ranked in top 25 of poll
т	Tied with team above or below also with this symbol

== Regular season schedule ==
The 2024 schedule was released on February 29, 2024.

Index to colors and formatting
American member won
American member lost
American teams in **bold**

=== Week 1 ===
Date	Time	Visiting team	Home team	Site	TV	Result	Attendance	Ref.
August 29	8:00 p.m.	Alcorn State	**UAB**	Protective Stadium • Birmingham, AL	ESPN+	**W** 41–3	21,267	
August 29	8:00 p.m.	Southeastern Louisiana	**Tulane**	Yulman Stadium • New Orleans, LA	ESPN+	**W** 52–0	20,143	
August 29	8:00 p.m.	Northwestern State	**Tulsa**	H. A. Chapman Stadium • Tulsa, OK	ESPN+	**W** 62–28	16,483	
August 30	6:00 p.m.	Lehigh	**Army**	Michie Stadium • West Point, NY	CBSSN	**W** 42–7	23,760	
August 30	7:00 p.m.	**Temple**	No. 16 Oklahoma	Gaylord Family Oklahoma Memorial Stadium • Norman, OK	ESPN	**L** 3–51	83,329	
August 30	7:00 p.m.	**Florida Atlantic**	Michigan State	Spartan Stadium • East Lansing, MI	BTN	**L** 10–16	70,271	
August 31	12:00 p.m.	Bucknell	**Navy**	Navy–Marine Corps Memorial Stadium • Annapolis, MD	CBSSN	**W** 49–21	28,763	
August 31	3:30 p.m.	Kennesaw State	**UTSA**	Alamodome • San Antonio, TX	ESPN+	**W** 28–16	25,911	
August 31	5:00 p.m.	**North Texas**	South Alabama	Hancock Whitney Stadium • Mobile, AL	ESPN+	**W** 52–38	15,559	
August 31	6:00 p.m.	Norfolk State	**East Carolina**	Dowdy–Ficklen Stadium • Greenville, NC	ESPN+	**W** 42–3	36,467	
August 31	7:00 p.m.	North Alabama	**Memphis**	Simmons Bank Liberty Stadium • Memphis, TN	ESPN+	**W** 40–0	25,849	
August 31	7:00 p.m.	Sam Houston	**Rice**	Rice Stadium • Houston, TX	ESPN+	**L** 14–34	17,298	
August 31	7:00 p.m.	Bethune-Cookman	**South Florida**	Raymond James Stadium • Tampa, FL	ESPN+	**W** 48–3	36,694	
August 31	8:00 p.m.	James Madison	**Charlotte**	Jerry Richardson Stadium • Charlotte, NC	ESPNU	**L** 7–30	15,614	
^{#}Rankings from AP Poll released prior to game. All times are in Eastern Time.

=== Week 2 ===
Date	Time	Visiting team	Home team	Site	TV	Result	Attendance	Ref.
September 7	12:00 p.m.	**Army**	**Florida Atlantic**	FAU Stadium • Boca Raton, FL	CBSSN	**ARMY** 24–7	21,810	
September 7	12:00 p.m.	Troy	**Memphis**	Simmons Bank Liberty Stadium • Memphis, TN	ESPNU	**W** 38–17	23,246	
September 7	12:00 p.m.	No. 17 Kansas State	**Tulane**	Yulman Stadium • New Orleans, LA	ESPN	**L** 27–34	25,034	
September 7	3:30 p.m.	**Charlotte**	North Carolina	Kenan Memorial Stadium • Chapel Hill, NC	ACCN	**L** 20–38	48,431	
September 7	3:30 p.m.	**Temple**	**Navy**	Navy–Marine Corps Memorial Stadium • Annapolis, MD	CBSSN	**NAVY** 38–11	28,889	
September 7	4:00 p.m.	**UTSA**	Texas State	Bobcat Stadium • San Marcos, TX (I-35 Rivalry)	ESPN+	**L** 10–49	28,000	
September 7	6:00 p.m.	**East Carolina**	Old Dominion	S.B. Ballard Stadium • Norfolk, VA	ESPN+	**W** 20–14	21,944	
September 7	7:00 p.m.	**UAB**	Louisiana–Monroe	JPS Field at Malone Stadium • Monroe, LA	ESPN+	**L** 6–32	12,327	
September 7	7:00 p.m.	Texas Southern	**Rice**	Rice Stadium • Houston, TX	ESPN+	**W** 69–7	17,760	
September 7	7:00 p.m.	**South Florida**	No. 4 Alabama	Bryant–Denny Stadium • Tuscaloosa, AL	ESPN	**L** 16–42	100,077	
September 7	7:00 p.m.	**Tulsa**	Arkansas State	Centennial Bank Stadium • Jonesboro, AR	ESPN+	**L** 24–28	19,316	
September 7	7:30 p.m.	Stephen F. Austin	**North Texas**	DATCU Stadium • Denton, TX	ESPNU	**W** 35–20	23,510	
^{#}Rankings from AP Poll released prior to game. All times are in Eastern Time.

=== Week 3 ===
Date	Time	Visiting team	Home team	Site	TV	Result	Attendance	Ref.
September 14	12:00 p.m.	**Memphis**	Florida State	Doak Campbell Stadium • Tallahassee, FL	ESPN	**W** 20–12	55,107	
September 14	12:00 p.m.	**North Texas**	Texas Tech	Jones AT&T Stadium • Lubbock, TX	FS1	**L** 21–66	57,865	
September 14	12:00 p.m.	No. 13 Oklahoma State	**Tulsa**	H. A. Chapman Stadium • Tulsa, OK (rivalry)	ESPN2	**L** 10–45	30,915	
September 14	2:00 p.m.	Coastal Carolina	**Temple**	Lincoln Financial Field • Philadelphia, PA	ESPN+	**L** 20–28	13,945	
September 14	3:30 p.m.	**Tulane**	No. 15 Oklahoma	Gaylord Family Oklahoma Memorial Stadium • Norman, OK	ESPN	**L** 19–34	83,325	
September 14	4:00 p.m.	Appalachian State	**East Carolina**	Dowdy–Ficklen Stadium • Greenville, NC	ESPN+	**L** 19–21	46,117	
September 14	4:15 p.m.	**UAB**	Arkansas	Donald W. Reynolds Razorback Stadium • Fayetteville, AR	SECN	**L** 27–37	75,021	
September 14	6:00 p.m.	Gardner–Webb	**Charlotte**	Jerry Richardson Stadium • Charlotte, NC	ESPN+	**W** 27–26	16,715	
September 14	6:00 p.m.	FIU	**Florida Atlantic**	FAU Stadium • Boca Raton, FL (Shula Bowl)	ESPN+	**W** 38–20	24,283	
September 14	7:00 p.m.	**UTSA**	No. 2 Texas	Darrell K Royal–Texas Memorial Stadium • Austin, TX	ESPN	**L** 7–56	101,892	
September 14	7:00 p.m.	**South Florida**	Southern Miss	M. M. Roberts Stadium • Hattiesburg, MS	ESPN+	**W** 49–24	23,537	
September 14	8:00 p.m.	**Rice**	Houston	TDECU Stadium • Houston, TX (rivalry)	ESPN+	**L** 7–33	28,146	
^{#}Rankings from AP Poll released prior to game. All times are in Eastern Time.

=== Week 4 ===
Date	Time	Visiting team	Home team	Site	TV	Result	Attendance	Ref.
September 21	12:00 p.m.	**Rice**	**Army**	Michie Stadium • West Point, NY	CBSSN	**ARMY** 37–14	26,654	
September 21	12:00 p.m.	**Charlotte**	Indiana	Memorial Stadium • Bloomington, IN	BTN	**L** 14–52	43,109	
September 21	12:00 p.m.	**Tulane**	Louisiana	Cajun Field • Lafayette, LA	ESPNU	**W** 41–33	22,534	
September 21	2:00 p.m.	Utah State	**Temple**	Lincoln Financial Field • Philadelphia, PA	ESPN+	**W** 45–29	11,384	
September 21	3:30 p.m.	**Memphis**	**Navy**	Navy–Marine Corps Memorial Stadium • Annapolis, MD	CBSSN	**NAVY** 56–44	31,268	
September 21	3:30 p.m.	Houston Christian	**UTSA**	Alamodome • San Antonio, TX	ESPN+	**W** 45–7	20,973	
September 21	6:00 p.m.	**East Carolina**	Liberty	Williams Stadium • Lynchburg, VA	ESPN+	**L** 24–35	24,076	
September 21	7:00 p.m.	**Florida Atlantic**	UConn	Rentschler Field • East Hartford, CT	CBSSN	**L** 14–48	20,144	
September 21	7:00 p.m.	Wyoming	**North Texas**	DATCU Stadium • Denton, TX	ESPN+	**W** 44–17	27,049	
September 21	7:00 p.m.	No. 8 Miami (FL)	**South Florida**	Raymond James Stadium • Tampa, FL	ESPN	**L** 15–50	58,616	
September 21	7:00 p.m.	**Tulsa**	Louisiana Tech	Joe Aillet Stadium • Ruston, LA	ESPN+	**W** 23–20 ^{OT}	18,152	
^{#}Rankings from AP Poll released prior to game. All times are in Eastern Time.

=== Week 5 ===
Date	Time	Visiting team	Home team	Site	TV	Result	Attendance	Ref.
September 26	7:30 p.m.	**Army**	Temple	Lincoln Financial Field • Philadelphia, PA	ESPN	**ARMY** 42–14	13,255	
September 28	12:00 p.m.	**Navy**	UAB	Protective Stadium • Birmingham, AL	ESPN2	**NAVY** 41–18	21,536	
September 28	12:00 p.m.	**South Florida**	Tulane	Yulman Stadium • New Orleans, LA	ESPNU	**TULN** 45–10	20,783	
September 28	4:00 p.m.	**UTSA**	East Carolina	Dowdy–Ficklen Stadium • Greenville, NC	ESPN+	**ECU** 30–20	41,851	
September 28	6:00 p.m.	Wagner	Florida Atlantic	FAU Stadium • Boca Raton, FL	ESPN+	**W** 41–10	21,151	
September 28	7:00 p.m.	**Charlotte**	Rice	Rice Stadium • Houston, TX	ESPN+	**CHAR** 21–20	17,455	
September 28	7:00 p.m.	**Tulsa**	North Texas	DATCU Stadium • Denton, TX	ESPN+	**UNT** 52–20	18,529	
September 28	7:30 p.m.	Middle Tennessee	Memphis	Simmons Bank Liberty Stadium • Memphis, TN	ESPNU	**W** 24–7	25,266	
^{#}Rankings from AP Poll released prior to game. All times are in Eastern Time.

=== Week 6 ===
Date	Time	Visiting team	Home team	Site	TV	Result	Attendance	Ref.
October 5	12:00 p.m.	**Army**	**Tulsa**	H. A. Chapman Stadium • Tulsa, OK	ESPNU	**ARMY** 49–7	24,409	
October 5	12:00 p.m.	**Navy**	Air Force	Falcon Stadium • USAF Academy, CO (Commander-in-Chief's Trophy)	CBS	**W** 34–7	39,441	
October 5	1:00 p.m.	**Tulane**	**UAB**	Protective Stadium • Birmingham, AL	ESPN+	**TULN** 71–20	19,724	
October 5	3:30 p.m.	**East Carolina**	**Charlotte**	Jerry Richardson Stadium • Charlotte, NC	ESPNU	**CHAR** 55–24	17,102	
October 5	3:30 p.m.	**Temple**	UConn	Rentschler Field • East Hartford, CT	CBSSN	**L** 20–29	28,921	
^{#}Rankings from AP Poll released prior to game. All times are in Eastern Time.

=== Week 7 ===
Date	Time	Visiting team	Home team	Site	TV	Result	Attendance	Ref.
October 12	12:00 p.m.	**UAB**	**Army**	Michie Stadium • West Point, NY	CBSSN	**ARMY** 44–10	29,002	
October 12	3:30 p.m.	**Memphis**	**South Florida**	Camping World Stadium • Orlando, FL	ESPN+	**MEM** 21–3	3,365	
October 12	7:00 p.m.	**North Texas**	**Florida Atlantic**	FAU Stadium • Boca Raton, FL	ESPN2	**UNT** 41–37	14,576	
October 12	7:00 p.m.	**UTSA**	**Rice**	Rice Stadium • Houston, TX	ESPN+	**RICE** 29–27	18,660	
^{#}Rankings from AP Poll released prior to game. All times are in Eastern Time.

=== Week 8 ===
Date	Time	Visiting team	Home team	Site	TV	Result	Attendance	Ref.
October 19	12:00 p.m.	East Carolina	No. 23 **Army**	Michie Stadium • West Point, NY	ESPN2	**ARMY** 45–28	29,044	
October 19	2:00 p.m.	Tulsa	**Temple**	Lincoln Financial Field • Philadelphia, PA	ESPN+	**TEM** 20–10	18,721	
October 19	3:30 p.m.	Charlotte	No. 25 **Navy**	Navy–Marine Corps Memorial Stadium • Annapolis, MD	CBSSN	**NAVY** 51–17	35,094	
October 19	3:30 p.m.	UAB	**South Florida**	Raymond James Stadium • Tampa, FL	ESPN+	**USF** 35–25	28,154	
October 19	3:30 p.m.	Florida Atlantic	**UTSA**	Alamodome • San Antonio, TX	ESPN+	**UTSA** 38–24	20,802	
October 19	3:30 p.m.	Rice	**Tulane**	Yulman Stadium • New Orleans, LA	ESPN+	**TULN** 24–10	22,897	
October 19	7:30 p.m.	North Texas	**Memphis**	Simmons Bank Liberty Stadium • Memphis, TN	ESPNU	**MEM** 52–44	24,110	
^{#}Rankings from AP Poll released prior to game. All times are in Eastern Time.

=== Week 9 ===
Date	Time	Visiting team	Home team	Site	TV	Result	Attendance	Ref.
October 26	12:00 p.m.	No. 12 Notre Dame	No. 24 **Navy**	MetLife Stadium • East Rutherford, NJ (rivalry)	ABC	**L** 14–51	76,112	
October 26	12:00 p.m.	**Charlotte**	**Memphis**	Simmons Bank Liberty Stadium • Memphis, TN	ESPNU	**MEM** 33–28	25,478	
October 26	12:00 p.m.	**Tulane**	**North Texas**	DATCU Stadium • Denton, TX	ESPN2	**TULN** 45–37	23,138	
October 26	2:00 p.m.	**Temple**	**East Carolina**	Dowdy–Ficklen Stadium • Greenville, NC	ESPN+	**ECU** 56–34	33,744	
October 26	3:30 p.m.	**Rice**	UConn	Rentschler Field • East Hartford, CT	CBSSN	**L** 10–17	23,711	
October 26	3:30 p.m.	**UTSA**	**Tulsa**	H. A. Chapman Stadium • Tulsa, OK	ESPN+	**TLSA** 46–45	17,439	
^{#}Rankings from AP Poll released prior to game. All times are in Eastern Time.

=== Week 10 ===
Date	Time	Visiting team	Home team	Site	TV	Result	Attendance	Ref.
October 31	7:30 p.m.	**Tulane**	**Charlotte**	Jerry Richardson Stadium • Charlotte, NC	ESPN	**TULN** 34–3	12,268	
November 1	7:30 p.m.	**South Florida**	**Florida Atlantic**	FAU Stadium • Boca Raton, FL	ESPN2	**USF** 44–21	20,111	
November 2	12:00 p.m.	Air Force	No. 21 **Army**	Michie Stadium • West Point, NY (Commander-in-Chief's Trophy)	CBS	**W** 20–3	30,046	
November 2	12:00 p.m.	**Memphis**	**UTSA**	Alamodome • San Antonio, TX	ESPN2	**UTSA** 44–36	17,198	
November 2	2:30 p.m.	**Tulsa**	**UAB**	Protective Stadium • Birmingham, AL	ESPN+	**UAB** 59–21	17,944	
November 2	4:00 p.m.	**Navy**	**Rice**	Rice Stadium • Houston, TX	ESPN2	**RICE** 24–10	21,253	
^{#}Rankings from AP Poll released prior to game. All times are in Eastern Time.

=== Week 11 ===
Date	Time	Visiting team	Home team	Site	TV	Result	Attendance	Ref.
November 7	8:00 p.m.	**Florida Atlantic**	East Carolina	Dowdy–Ficklen Stadium • Greenville, NC	ESPN2	**ECU** 49–14	30,573	
November 8	9:00 p.m.	**Rice**	Memphis	Simmons Bank Liberty Stadium • Memphis, TN	ESPN2	**MEM** 27–20	23,692	
November 9	12:00 p.m.	**Navy**	South Florida	Raymond James Stadium • Tampa, FL	ESPN2	**NAVY** 28–7	34,091	
November 9	2:30 p.m.	UConn	UAB	Protective Stadium • Birmingham, AL	ESPN+	**L** 23–31	18,351	
November 9	3:30 p.m.	No. 25 **Army**	North Texas	DATCU Stadium • Denton, TX	ESPN2	**ARMY** 14–3	28,519	
November 9	4:00 p.m.	**Temple**	Tulane	Yulman Stadium • New Orleans, LA	ESPNU	**TULN** 52–6	30,000	
^{#}Rankings from AP Poll released prior to game. All times are in Eastern Time.

=== Week 12 ===
Date	Time	Visiting team	Home team	Site	TV	Result	Attendance	Ref.
November 14	7:30 p.m.	**East Carolina**	Tulsa	H. A. Chapman Stadium • Tulsa, OK	ESPN	**ECU** 38–31	17,979	
November 15	8:00 p.m.	**North Texas**	UTSA	Alamodome • San Antonio, TX	ESPN2	**UTSA** 48–27	21,350	
November 16	12:00 p.m.	No. 25 **Tulane**	Navy	Navy–Marine Corps Memorial Stadium • Annapolis, MD	ESPN2	**TULN** 35–0	38,914	
November 16	2:00 p.m.	**Florida Atlantic**	Temple	Lincoln Financial Field • Philadelphia, PA	ESPN+	**TEM** 18–15 ^{OT}	12,291	
November 16	3:30 p.m.	**South Florida**	Charlotte	Jerry Richardson Stadium • Charlotte, NC	ESPN+	**USF** 59–24	15,030	
November 16	8:00 p.m.	**UAB**	Memphis	Simmons Bank Liberty Stadium • Memphis, TN (Battle for the Bones)	ESPN2	**MEM** 53–18	24,225	
^{#}Rankings from AP Poll released prior to game. All times are in Eastern Time.

=== Week 13 ===
Date	Time	Visiting team	Home team	Site	TV	Result	Attendance	Ref.
November 22	7:00 p.m.	**Temple**	**UTSA**	Alamodome • San Antonio, TX	ESPN2	**UTSA** 51–27	20,121	
November 23	2:00 p.m.	**Rice**	**UAB**	Protective Stadium • Birmingham, AL	ESPN+	**UAB** 40–14	16,181	
November 23	3:00 p.m.	**Charlotte**	**Florida Atlantic**	FAU Stadium • Boca Raton, FL	ESPN+	**CHAR** 39–27	15,066	
November 23	3:30 p.m.	**East Carolina**	**North Texas**	DATCU Stadium • Denton, TX	ESPN+	**ECU** 40–28	17,387	
November 23	3:30 p.m.	**Tulsa**	**South Florida**	Raymond James Stadium • Tampa, FL	ESPN+	**USF** 63–30	27,623	
November 23	7:00 p.m.	No. 6 Notre Dame	No. 19 **Army**	Yankee Stadium • Bronx, NY (Shamrock Series, rivalry)	NBC	**L** 14–49	47,342	
^{#}Rankings from AP Poll released prior to game. All times are in Eastern Time.

=== Week 14 ===
Date	Time	Visiting team	Home team	Site	TV	Result	Attendance	Ref.
November 28	7:30 p.m.	Memphis	No. 17 **Tulane**	Yulman Stadium • New Orleans, LA	ESPN	**MEM** 34–24	25,021	
November 29	12:00 p.m.	Navy	**East Carolina**	Dowdy–Ficklen Stadium • Greenville, NC	ESPN	**NAVY** 34–20	35,663	
November 30	12:00 p.m.	UTSA	**Army**	Michie Stadium • West Point, NY	CBSSN	**ARMY** 29–24	22,120	
November 30	12:00 p.m.	North Texas	**Temple**	Lincoln Financial Field • Philadelphia, PA	ESPN+	**UNT** 24–17		
November 30	2:00 p.m.	South Florida	**Rice**	Rice Stadium • Houston, TX	ESPN+	**RICE** 35–28	16,430	
November 30	3:30 p.m.	UAB	**Charlotte**	Jerry Richardson Stadium • Charlotte, NC	ESPN+	**CHAR** 29–27	8,091	
November 30	3:30 p.m.	Florida Atlantic	**Tulsa**	H. A. Chapman Stadium • Tulsa, OK	ESPN+	**FAU** 63–16	15,243	
^{#}Rankings from AP Poll released prior to game. All times are in Eastern Time.

=== Championship Game ===
Date	Time	Visiting team	Home team	Site	TV	Result	Attendance	Ref.
December 6	8:00 p.m.	**Tulane**	No. 24 **Army**	Michie Stadium • West Point, NY	ABC	**ARMY** 35–14	14,016	
^{#}Rankings from AP Poll released prior to game. All times are in Eastern Time.

=== Week 16 ===
Date	Time	Visiting team	Home team	Site	TV	Result	Attendance	Ref.
December 14	3:00 p.m.	**Navy**	No. 19 **Army**	Northwest Stadium • Landover, MD (125th Army–Navy Game, Commander-in-Chief's Trophy)	CBS	**NAVY** 31–13		
^{#}Rankings from AP Poll released prior to game. All times are in Eastern Time.

^note1 The Army–Navy game will be played as a non-conference game and will therefore not count in the AAC conference standings.

== Postseason ==
=== Bowl Games ===
Legend
American win
American loss

Bowl game	Date	Site	Television	Time (EST)	AAC team	Opponent	Score	Attendance
Frisco Bowl	December 17	Toyota Stadium • Frisco, TX	ESPN	9:00 p.m.	No. 25 Memphis	West Virginia	W 42–37	12,022
Gasparilla Bowl	December 20	Raymond James Stadium • Tampa, FL	ESPN	3:30 p.m.	Tulane	Florida	L 8–33	41,472
Myrtle Beach Bowl	December 23	Brooks Stadium • Conway, SC	ESPN	11:00 a.m.	UTSA	Coastal Carolina	W 44–15	8,164
Hawaii Bowl	December 24	Clarence T. C. Ching Athletics Complex • Honolulu, HI	ESPN	8:00 p.m.	South Florida	San Jose State	W 41–39^{5OT}	6,720
Armed Forces Bowl	December 27	Amon G. Carter Stadium • Fort Worth, TX	ESPN	12:00 p.m.	Navy	Oklahoma	W 21–20	50,754
Military Bowl	December 28	Navy–Marine Corps Memorial Stadium • Annapolis, MD	ESPN	5:45 p.m.	East Carolina	NC State	W 26-21	23,981
Independence Bowl	December 28	Independence Stadium • Shreveport, LA	ESPN	9:15 p.m.	No. 22 Army	Louisiana Tech^{1}	W 27–6	34,283
First Responder Bowl	January 3, 2025	Gerald J. Ford Stadium • University Park, TX	ESPN	4:00 p.m.	North Texas	Texas State	L 28–30	28,725

- ^{1} Army was originally to play Marshall in the Independence Bowl. However, Marshall withdrew from the bowl due to a high number of their players entering the NCAA transfer portal. Louisiana Tech was selected as their replacement.

== Versus other conference records ==
2024–2025 records against non-conference foes:

Regular season

Power 4 Conferences	Record
ACC	1–2
Big Ten	0–2
Big 12	0–4
Notre Dame	0–0
SEC	0–5
Power 4 Total	1–13
Other FBS conferences	Record
C-USA	4–2
Independents (Excluding Notre Dame)	0–2
MAC	0–0
Mountain West	3–0
Pac-12	0–0
Sun Belt	5–6
Other FBS Total	12–10
FCS Opponents	Record
Football Championship Subdivision	13–0
Total Non-Conference Record	26–23

Post Season

Power 4 Conferences	Record
ACC	1–0
Big Ten	0–0
Big 12	1–0
Notre Dame	0–0
SEC	1–1
Power 4 Total	3–1
Other FBS Conferences	Record
C–USA	1–0
Independents (Excluding Notre Dame)	0–0
MAC	0–0
Mountain West	1–0
Pac-12	0–0
Sun Belt	1–1
Other FBS Total	3–1
Total Bowl Record	6–2

=== Power 4 matchups ===
This is a list of games the American has scheduled versus power conference teams (ACC, Big Ten, Big 12, Notre Dame and SEC). All rankings are from the current AP Poll at the time of the game.

Date	Conference	Visitor	Home	Site	Score
August 30	Big Ten	Florida Atlantic	Michigan State	Spartan Stadium • East Lansing, MI	L 10–16
August 30	SEC	Temple	Oklahoma	Gaylord Family Oklahoma Memorial Stadium • Norman, OK	L 3–51
September 7	ACC	Charlotte	North Carolina	Kenan Memorial Stadium • Chapel Hill, NC	L 20–38
September 7	SEC	South Florida	No. 4 Alabama	Bryant–Denny Stadium • Tuscaloosa, AL	L 16–42
September 7	Big 12	No. 17 Kansas State	Tulane	Yulman Stadium • New Orleans, LA	L 27–34
September 14	SEC	UAB	Arkansas	Donald W. Reynolds Razorback Stadium • Fayetteville, AR	L 27–37
September 14	ACC	Memphis	Florida State	Doak Campbell Stadium • Tallahassee, FL	W 20–12
September 14	Big 12	North Texas	Texas Tech	Jones AT&T Stadium • Lubbock, TX	L 21–66
September 14	Big 12	Rice	Houston	TDECU Stadium • Houston, TX	L 7–33
September 14	SEC	UTSA	No. 2 Texas	Darrell K Royal–Texas Memorial Stadium • Austin, TX	L 7–56
September 14	SEC	Tulane	No. 15 Oklahoma	Gaylord Family Oklahoma Memorial Stadium • Norman, OK	L 19–34
September 14	Big 12	No. 13 Oklahoma State	Tulsa	H. A. Chapman Stadium • Tulsa, OK	L 10–45
September 21	Big Ten	Charlotte	Indiana	Memorial Stadium • Bloomington, IN	L 14–52
September 21	ACC	No. 8 Miami (FL)	South Florida	Raymond James Stadium • Tampa, FL	L 15–50
October 26	Independent	No. 12 Notre Dame	No. 24 Navy	MetLife Stadium • East Rutherford, NJ	L 14–51
November 23	Independent	Notre Dame	Army	Yankee Stadium • Bronx, NY	

=== Group-of-five matchups ===
The following games include American Athletic Conference teams competing against teams from C-USA, the MAC, Mountain West, or Sun Belt.

Date	Conference	Visitor	Home	Site	Score
August 31	Sun Belt	James Madison	Charlotte	Jerry Richardson Stadium • Charlotte, NC	L 7–30
August 31	Sun Belt	North Texas	South Alabama	Hancock Whitney Stadium • Mobile, AL	W 52–38
August 31	C-USA	Sam Houston	Rice	Rice Stadium • Houston, TX	L 14–34
August 31	C-USA	Kennesaw State	UTSA	Alamodome • San Antonio, TX	W 28–16
September 7	Sun Belt	UAB	Louisiana–Monroe	JPS Field at Malone Stadium • Monroe, LA	L 6–32
September 7	Sun Belt	East Carolina	Old Dominion	S.B. Ballard Stadium • Norfolk, VA	W 20–14
September 7	Sun Belt	Troy	Memphis	Simmons Bank Liberty Stadium • Memphis, TN	W 38–17
September 7	Sun Belt	UTSA	Texas State	Bobcat Stadium • San Marcos, TX	L 10–49
September 7	Sun Belt	Tulsa	Arkansas State	Centennial Bank Stadium • Jonesboro, AR	L 24–28
September 14	Sun Belt	Appalachian State	East Carolina	Dowdy–Ficklen Stadium • Greenville, NC	L 19–21
September 14	C-USA	FIU	Florida Atlantic	FAU Stadium • Boca Raton, FL	W 38–20
September 14	Sun Belt	South Florida	Southern Miss	M. M. Roberts Stadium • Hattiesburg, MS	W 49–24
September 14	Sun Belt	Coastal Carolina	Temple	Lincoln Financial Field • Philadelphia, PA	L 20–28
September 21	C-USA	East Carolina	Liberty	Williams Stadium • Lynchburg, VA	L 24–35
September 21	Mountain West	Wyoming	North Texas	DATCU Stadium • Denton, TX	W 44–17
September 21	Mountain West	Utah State	Temple	Lincoln Financial Field • Philadelphia, PA	W 45–29
September 21	Sun Belt	Tulane	Louisiana	Cajun Field • Lafayette, LA	W 41–33
September 21	C-USA	Tulsa	Louisiana Tech	Joe Aillet Stadium • Ruston, LA	W 23–20^{OT}
September 28	C-USA	Middle Tennessee	Memphis	Simmons Bank Liberty Stadium • Memphis, TN	W 24–7
October 5	Mountain West	Navy	Air Force	Falcon Stadium • Colorado Springs, CO	W 34–7
November 2	Mountain West	Air Force	Army	Michie Stadium • West Point, NY	

=== FBS independents matchups ===
The following games include AAC teams competing against FBS independents, which includes UConn or UMass.

Date	Visitor	Home	Site	Score
September 21	Florida Atlantic	UConn	Rentschler Field • East Hartford, CT	L 14–48
October 5	Temple	UConn	Rentschler Field • East Hartford, CT	L 20–29
October 26	Rice	UConn	Rentschler Field • East Hartford, CT	L 10–17
November 9	UConn	UAB	Protective Stadium • Birmingham, AL	L 31–23

=== FCS matchups ===
Date	Visitor	Home	Site	Score
August 29	Alcorn State	UAB	Protective Stadium • Birmingham, AL	W 41–3
August 29	Southeastern Louisiana	Tulane	Yulman Stadium • New Orleans, LA	W 52–0
August 29	Northwestern State	Tulsa	H. A. Chapman Stadium • Tulsa, OK	W 62–28
August 30	Lehigh	Army	Michie Stadium • West Point, NY	W 42–7
August 31	Norfolk State	East Carolina	Dowdy–Ficklen Stadium • Greenville, NC	W 42–3
August 31	North Alabama	Memphis	Simmons Bank Liberty Stadium • Memphis, TN	W 40–0
August 31	Bucknell	Navy	Navy–Marine Corps Memorial Stadium • Annapolis, MD	W 49–21
August 31	Bethune-Cookman	South Florida	Raymond James Stadium • Tampa, FL	W 48–3
September 7	Stephen F. Austin	North Texas	DATCU Stadium • Denton, TX	W 35–20
September 7	Texas Southern	Rice	Rice Stadium • Houston, TX	W 69–7
September 14	Gardner–Webb	Charlotte	Jerry Richardson Stadium • Charlotte, NC	W 27–26
September 21	Houston Christian	UTSA	Alamodome • San Antonio, TX	W 45–7
September 28	Wagner	Florida Atlantic	FAU Stadium • Boca Raton, FL	W 41–10

== Awards and honors ==
=== Player of the week honors ===
Week	Offensive			Defensive			Special Teams		
Week	Player	Team	Position	Player	Team	Position	Player	Team	Position
Week 1	Chandler Morris	North Texas	QB	Rayshawn Pleasant	Tulane	CB	Kamdyn Benjamin	Tulsa	WR/PR
Week 2	Blake Horvath	Navy	QB	Elijah Herring	Memphis	LB	Matthew Rhodes	Army	P/H
Week 3	Seth Henigan	Memphis	QB	Chandler Martin	Memphis	LB	Michael O'Shaughnessy	Charlotte	P
Week 4	Blake Horvath (2)	Navy	QB	Colin Ramos	Navy	LB	Maddux Trujillo; Seth Morgan	Temple; Tulsa	K K
Week 5	Chandler Morris (2)	North Texas	QB	Gerrod Henderson	Tulane	DE	Noah Perez	East Carolina	K
Week 6	Bryson Daily	Army	QB	Jaxson Campbell	Navy	LB	Rayshawn Pleasant	Tulane	CB/KR
Week 7	Bryson Daily (2)	Army	QB	Chandler Martin (2)	Memphis	LB	Kali Nguma	North Texas	K
Week 8	Bryson Daily (3)	Army	QB	Dashaun Peele	Navy	CB	Jonah Delange	UAB	K
Week 9	Cooper Legas	Tulsa	QB	Chandler Martin (3)	Memphis	LB	Quinton Jackson	Rice	RB/KR
Week 10	Jalen Kitna	UAB	QB	Martavius French	UTSA	LB	Kam Shanks	UAB	WR/KR
Week 11	Katin Houser	East Carolina	QB	Kalib Fortner	Army	LB	Riley Riethman	Navy	P
Week 12	Seth Henigan (2)	Memphis	QB	Sam Howard	Tulane	LB	Tate Sandell	UTSA	K
Week 13	O'Mega Blake	Charlotte	WR	Jimmori Robinson	UTSA	LB	Stephen Rusnak	Charlotte	K
Week 14	Greg Desrosiers Jr.	Memphis	RB	Kourtlan Marsh	Memphis	DB	Michael O'Shaughnessy (2)	Charlotte	P

=== American Athletic Individual Awards ===
The following individuals received postseason honors as chosen by the league's head coaches.

Award	Player	School
Offensive Player of the Year	Bryson Daily	Army
Defensive Player of the Year	Jimmori Robinson	UTSA
Special Teams Player of the Year	Jonah Delange	UAB
Rookie of the Year	Joseph Williams	Tulsa
Coach of the Year	Jeff Monken	Army

=== All-Conference Teams ===
The following players were selected part of the All-Conference teams.

Position	Player	Team
First Team Offense
WR	Roc Taylor	Memphis
WR	DT Sheffield	North Texas
WR	Dante Wright	Temple
OT	Xavier Hill	Memphis
OT	Derrick Graham	Tulane
OG	Bill Katsigiannis	Army
OG	Shadre Hurst	Tulane
C	Brady Small	Army
TE	Anthony Landphere	Memphis
QB	Bryson Daily	Army
RB	Mario Anderson Jr.	Memphis
RB	Makhi Hughes	Tulane
First Team Defense
DL	Desmond Little	UAB
DL	William Whitlow	Memphis
DL	Landon Robinson	Navy
DL	Patrick Jenkins	Tulane
LB	Chandler Martin	Memphis
LB	Colin Ramos	Navy
LB	Tyquan King	Temple
LB	Jimmori Robinson	UTSA
CB	Davion Ross	Memphis
CB	Zah Frazier	UTSA
S	Max DiDomenico	Army
S	Rayuan Lane	Navy
First Team Special Teams
K	Jonah Delange	UAB
P	Andrew Stokes	South Florida
RS	Kam Shanks	UAB

Position	Player	Team
Second Team Offense
WR	O'Mega Blake	Charlotte
WR	Chase Sowell	East Carolina
WR	Mario Williams	Tulane
OT	Connor Finucane	Army
OT	Lucas Scott	Army
OG	Paolo Gennarelli	Army
OG	Josh Remetich	Tulane
C	Vincent Murphy	Tulane
TE	Oscar Cardenas	UTSA
QB	Chandler Morris	North Texas
RB	Kanye Udoh	Army
RB	Rahjai Harris	East Carolina
Second Team Defense
DL	Kyle Lewis	Army
DL	Justin Reed	Navy
DL	Decarius Hawthorne	South Florida
DL	Diwun Black	Temple
LB	Zakye Barker	East Carolina
LB	D. J. Woodbury	Temple
LB	Martavius French	UTSA
LB	Tyler Grubbs	Tulane
LB	Sam Howard	Tulane
CB	Dashaun Peele	Navy
CB	Micah Robinson	Tulane
S	Gabriel Taylor	Rice
S	Bailey Despanie	Tulane
Second Team Special Teams
K	Maddux Trujillo	Temple
P	Riley Riethman	Navy
RS	Rayshawn Pleasant	Tulane

Position	Player	Team
Third Team Offense
WR	Kam Shanks	UAB
WR	Sean Atkins	South Florida
WR	Kamdyn Benjamin	Tulsa
OT	Parker Moorer	East Carolina
OT	Rah Green	Tulane
OG	Jonah Gambill	Memphis
OG	Walter Young Bear	Tulsa
C	Trent Holler	Memphis
TE	Alex Bauman	Tulane
QB	Seth Henigan	Memphis
RB	Lee Beebe Jr.	UAB
RB	CJ Campbell Jr.	Florida Atlantic
Third Team Defense
DL	Demon Clowney	Charlotte
DL	Brandon Brown	UTSA
DL	Kam Hamilton	Tulane
DL	Adin Huntington	Tulane
LB	Michael Moore	UAB
LB	Elo Modozie	Army
LB	Andon Thomas	Army
LB	Jaylen Smith	North Texas
LB	Gavin Potter	Tulsa
CB	Ridge Texada	North Texas
CB	Caleb Ransaw	Tulane
S	Omar Rogers	East Carolina
S	CJ Heard	Florida Atlantic
Third Team Special Teams
K	Stephen Rusnak	Charlotte
P	Logan Lupo	Florida Atlantic
RS	DT Sheffield	North Texas

=== National awards ===
- Joe Moore Award: Army offensive line
- AFCA Assistant Coach of the Year: Sean Saturnio, Army special teams coach
- Bowl Challenge Cup highest percentage of bowl wins by conference

=== All-Americans ===
Position	Player	School	Selector
First Team All-Americans
OL	Bill Katsigiannis	Army	(SI)
AP / RS	Kam Shanks	UAB	(TSN, CBS, ESPN)
AP / RS	Rayshawn Pleasant	Tulane	(TSN)

Position	Player	School	Selector
Second Team All-Americans
OL	Lucas Scott	Army	(FWAA)
OL	Bill Katsigiannis	Army	(ESPN)
OL	Brady Small	Army	(USAT)
AP / RS	Rayshawn Pleasant	Tulane	(WCFF, CBS, ESPN)
AP / RS	Winston Wright	East Carolina	(FWAA)

== NFL draft ==
The NFL draft will be held at Lambeau Field in Green Bay, Wisconsin. The following list includes all AAC players in the draft.

=== List of selections ===
Player	Position	School	Draft round	Round pick	Overall pick	Team
Shavon Revel	CB	East Carolina	3	12	76	Dallas Cowboys
Caleb Ransaw	CB	Tulane	3	24	88	Jacksonville Jaguars
Zah Frazier	CB	UTSA	5	31	169	Chicago Bears
Rayuan Lane	S	Navy	6	24	200	Jacksonville Jaguars
Micah Robinson	CB	Tulane	7	21	237	Green Bay Packers
Kobee Minor	DB	Memphis	7	51	257	New England Patriots
