= Kam Shanks =

American football player

No. 5 – Wake Forest Demon Deacons
- Position: Wide receiver
- Class: Redshirt Junior

Personal information
- Listed height: 5 ft 8 in (1.73 m)
- Listed weight: 169 lb (77 kg)

Career information
- High school: Prattville (Prattville, Alabama)
- College: UAB (2023–2024); Arkansas (2025); Wake Forest (2026–present)

Awards and highlights
- First-team All-American (2024); First-team All-AAC (2024)
- Stats at ESPN

Kameron Shanks is an American college football wide receiver and return specialist for the Wake Forest Demon Deacons. He previously played for the UAB Blazers and Arkansas Razorbacks.

== Early life ==
Shanks attended Prattville High School in Prattville, Alabama, and initially committed to play college football for the Liberty Flames over offers from schools such as Tulane, Jacksonville State, UAB, Southern Miss, and Troy. However, he later flipped his commitment to play for the UAB Blazers.

== College career ==
=== UAB ===
As a freshman in 2023, Shanks returned five kickoffs from 93 yards in four games played and took a redshirt. In week 3 of the 2024 season, he hauled in five receptions for 31 yards and a touchdown versus Arkansas. In week 10, Shanks hauled in five receptions for 153 yards and three touchdowns, while also adding 19 yards on the ground, and setting a program record with 139 punt return yards while also adding a punt return touchdown, in a win over Tulsa. For his performance, he was named the American Athletic Conference special teams Player of the week. Shanks finished the 2024 season with 62 catches for 656 yards and six touchdowns, in addition to rushing eight times for 50 yards, while also leading the nation in punt return yards (329) and punt return touchdowns (two). He was named first-team all-conference as a returner, third-team all-conference as a wide receiver, and first-team all-America as a returner. After the season, Shanks entered his name into the NCAA transfer portal.

=== Arkansas ===
Shanks transferred in December 2024 to play for the Arkansas Razorbacks.

On January 3, 2026, Shanks announced that he would enter the transfer portal for the second time.

=== Wake Forest ===
On January 11, 2026, Shanks announced that he would transfer to Wake Forest.
