= Mario Anderson =

American football player (born 2001)

Ottawa Redblacks
- Position: Running back
- Roster status: Active
- CFL status: American

Personal information
- Born: April 24, 2001 (age 25); Summerville, South Carolina, U.S.
- Listed height: 5 ft 8 in (1.73 m)
- Listed weight: 205 lb (93 kg)

Career information
- High school: Stratford (Goose Creek, South Carolina)
- College: Newberry (2019–2022); South Carolina (2023); Memphis (2024)
- NFL draft: 2024: undrafted

Career history
- Saskatchewan Roughriders (2025); Ottawa Redblacks (2026–present)

Awards and highlights
- Grey Cup champion (2025); First-team All-AAC (2024); First-team All-SAC (2021, 2022)
- Stats at CFL.ca

Mario Anderson Jr. (born April 24, 2001) is an American professional football running back for the Ottawa Redblacks of the Canadian Football League (CFL). He played college football for the Newberry Wolves, South Carolina Gamecocks, and Memphis Tigers.

== Early life ==
Anderson attended Stratford High School in Goose Creek, South Carolina. An unranked recruit, he committed to play college football for Newberry College, joining the Division II team as a walk-on.

== College career ==
=== Newberry ===
In four years at Newberry from 2019 to 2022, Anderson rushed 513 times for 3,296 yards and 35 touchdowns and hauled in 21 receptions for 135 yards. He was named first-team all-conference twice in 2021 and 2022, while also being named an All-American and a Harlon Hill Trophy finalist in 2022.

=== South Carolina ===
Anderson transferred to play for the South Carolina Gamecocks. In week 2 of the 2023 season, he rushed six times for 32 yards in a win over Furman. In week 4, Anderson ran for 88 yards and a touchdown on 26 carries in a win over Mississippi State. In week 5, he broke off a 75-yard rushing touchdown against Tennessee. Anderson finished the 2023 season rushing for 707 yards and four touchdowns on 143 carries, while also hauling in 22 receptions for 153 yards and a touchdown. Following the season, he entered his name into the NCAA transfer portal.

=== Memphis ===
Anderson transferred to play for the Memphis Tigers. In week 7 of the 2024 season, he was ejected in the second quarter in a win over South Florida after spitting on Bulls defensive tackle Doug Blue-Eli. In week 8, Anderson rushed for 183 yards and four touchdowns on 22 carries in a win over North Texas. In week 12, he rushed for 138 yards and a touchdown on 22 carries to help beat UAB.

=== Statistics ===
Year	Team	Games		Rushing				Receiving			
Year	Team	GP	GS	Att	Yards	Avg	TD	Rec	Yards	Avg	TD
2019	Newberry	Redshirt (redshirt)									
2020	Newberry	6	-	69	504	7.3	4	3	19	6.3	0
2021	Newberry	13	-	233	1,237	5.3	12	12	91	7.6	0
2022	Newberry	10	-	211	1,560	7.4	19	6	25	4.2	0
2023	South Carolina	12	8	143	707	4.9	3	22	153	7.0	1
2024	Memphis	13	12	236	1,362	5.8	18	52	312	6.0	3
D-II career		29	-	513	3,296	6.4	35	21	135	6.4	0
FBS career		25	20	379	2,069	5.5	21	74	465	6.3	4

== Professional career ==
Pre-draft measurables
Height	Weight	Arm length	Hand span
5 ft 8 1/4 in (1.73 m)	206 lb (93 kg)	28 7/8 in (0.73 m)	9 in (0.23 m)
All values from Pro Day

=== Saskatchewan Roughriders ===
On April 29, 2025, it was announced that Anderson had signed with the Saskatchewan Roughriders. Following training camp, he accepted a practice roster position on June 1, 2025, but was released on June 23, 2025. However, following long-term injuries to backup running backs Thomas Bertrand-Hudon and Ka'Deem Carey, Anderson was re-signed on July 22, 2025.

On May 30, 2026, Anderson was released by the Roughriders as part of final roster cuts.

=== Ottawa Redblacks ===
On June 15, 2026, Anderson signed with the Ottawa Redblacks.
