= Bryce Archie =

American baseball pitcher (born 2004)

Personal information
- Born: April 27, 2004 (age 22) Austell, Georgia, U.S.
- Height: 6 ft 3 in (191 cm)
- Weight: 212 lb (96 kg; 15 st 2 lb)
- Football career

Profile
- Position: Quarterback

Career information
- High school: McEachern High School, (Powder Springs, Georgia)
- College: Coastal Carolina (2022); South Florida (2023–2024)
- Stats at ESPN

Sport
- Baseball career

Cincinnati Reds
- Pitcher
- Bats: Right Throws: Right
- Stats at Baseball Reference

Bryce Benjamin Archie (born April 27, 2004) is an American baseball pitcher in the Cincinnati Reds organization. He was selected by the Reds in the 14th round of the 2025 Major League Baseball draft. Archie previously played college football as a quarterback and baseball as a pitcher for the South Florida Bulls.

== Early life ==
Bryce Archie was born around 2004 in Powder Springs, Georgia, and attended McEachern High School. A three-sport athlete, he played football, baseball, and basketball. In 2021, he won a Georgia 7A regional football title as a quarterback and was named player of the year. On the baseball field, Archie played shortstop and pitcher, reaching 96 MPH as a pitcher and ranking as the 55th-best player in Georgia by Perfect Game. He was also named an Academic All-American in Georgia.

== College career ==
Archie began his college career at Coastal Carolina University, redshirting as a quarterback in 2022 and seeing action in two football games. He transferred to the University of South Florida in spring 2023, joining both the football and baseball teams.

=== Football ===
In 2023, Archie served as a backup quarterback to starter Byrum Brown, appearing in a mid-season game against Florida Atlantic (4/7, 44 yards). When Brown suffered a leg injury in 2024, Archie started the final eight games, completing 58% of his passes for 1,679 yards, 9 touchdowns, and 9 interceptions, with 137 rushing yards and 2 touchdowns. Notable performances included 206 yards and 2 touchdown passes in a 44–21 win over Florida Atlantic, 305 yards and 2 touchdowns against Tulsa, and starting in the 2024 Hawai’i Bowl against San Jose State. Archie’s leadership helped USF secure a second consecutive bowl appearance.

=== Baseball ===
In 2024, Archie joined the South Florida baseball team the week of the season opener. He made his debut against Marist where he threw one scoreless inning. On the season, he appeared in 13 games (3 starts) and recorded 17.2 innings with 18 strikeouts, 29 hits, and 16 runs allowed. In 2025, he appeared in 15 games (3 starts) with a 3.25 ERA, including wins against Maryland, UAB, and Tulane in three consecutive appearances. In the 2025 American Athletic Conference baseball tournament, Archie threw a combined four scoreless innings against East Carolina and Charlotte.

In the 2025 Major League Baseball draft, Archie was drafted by the Cincinnati Reds in the 14th round. His fastball reaches the upper 90s, and he has drawn comparisons to USF alum and MLB All-Star Shane McClanahan.

== Professional career ==
In the 2025 Major League Baseball draft, Archie was selected by the Cincinnati Reds in the 14th round (414th overall) as a right-handed pitcher.

He signed with the Reds on July 21, 2025.

On August 4, 2025, Archie was assigned to the Arizona Complex League Reds (ACL Reds), the Reds' rookie-level affiliate.

As of January 2026, Archie has not yet recorded regular-season professional statistics, having participated only in limited post-draft activity.

== Career statistics ==
=== MiLB ===
Year	Team	Lg	Aff	G	GS	W	L	ERA	CG	SHO	SV	IP	H	R	ER	HR	BB	SO
2026	Daytona	MIDW	CIN	16	0	5	3	3.69	0	0	1	46.1	43	26	19	4	27	46
2026	Dayton	FLOR	CIN															
Career				16	0	5	3	3.69	0	0	1	46.1	43	26	19	4	27	46

=== College football ===
Year	Team	Games			Passing									Rushing		
Year	Team	GP	GS	Record	Cmp	Att	Pct	Yds	Y/A	TD	Int	Rtg	Att	Yds	Avg	TD
2022	Coastal Carolina	2	0	—	1	4	25.0	9	2.3	0	0	43.9	3	18	6.0	0
2023	South Florida	7	0	—	7	15	46.7	53	3.5	0	0	76.3	9	-5	-0.7	0
2024	South Florida	12	8	5–3	172	290	59.3	1,914	6.6	9	10	118.1	68	119	1.9	2
Career		21	8	5–3	180	309	58.3	1,976	6.4	9	10	115.1	80	142	1.8	2

=== College baseball ===
Year	Team	G	GS	W	L	ERA	CG	SHO	SV	IP	H	R	ER	HR	BB	SO
2024	South Florida	13	3	0	2	8.15	0	0	0	17.2	29	16	16	3	14	18
2025	South Florida	15	3	3	1	3.25	0	0	0	44.1	41	20	16	0	16	36
Career		28	6	3	3	4.65	0	0	0	62.0	70	36	32	3	30	54
