= 2024 Tulsa Golden Hurricane football team =

American college football season

2024 Tulsa Golden Hurricane football
- Conference: American Athletic Conference
- Record: 3–9 (1–7 AAC)
- Head coach: Kevin Wilson (2nd season; first 11 games); Ryan Switzer (interim; final game)
- Offensive coordinator: Steve Spurrier Jr. (2nd season)
- Offensive scheme: Spread
- Defensive coordinator: Chris Polizzi (2nd season)
- Base defense: 4–2–5
- Home stadium: Skelly Field at H. A. Chapman Stadium

2024 American Athletic Conference football standings
| | Conf. | | | Overall |
| Team | W | | L | W | | L |
|---|---|---|---|---|---|---|
| No. 21 Army y$ | 8 | – | 0 | 12 | – | 2 |
| Tulane y | 7 | – | 1 | 9 | – | 5 |
| Navy | 6 | – | 2 | 10 | – | 3 |
| No. 24 Memphis | 6 | – | 2 | 11 | – | 2 |
| East Carolina | 5 | – | 3 | 8 | – | 5 |
| South Florida | 4 | – | 4 | 7 | – | 6 |
| UTSA | 4 | – | 4 | 7 | – | 6 |
| Charlotte | 4 | – | 4 | 5 | – | 7 |
| North Texas | 3 | – | 5 | 6 | – | 7 |
| Rice | 3 | – | 5 | 4 | – | 8 |
| Temple | 2 | – | 6 | 3 | – | 9 |
| UAB | 2 | – | 6 | 3 | – | 9 |
| Florida Atlantic | 1 | – | 7 | 3 | – | 9 |
| Tulsa | 1 | – | 7 | 3 | – | 9 |
Championship: Army 35, Tulane 14
$ – Conference champion; y – Championship game participant; Rankings from AP Poll

The 2024 Tulsa Golden Hurricane football team represented the University of Tulsa in the American Athletic Conference (AAC) during the 2024 NCAA Division I FBS football season. The Golden Hurricane were led by Kevin Wilson in his second year as the head coach. The Golden Hurricane played their home games at H. A. Chapman Stadium, located in Tulsa, Oklahoma.

Wilson was fired as the Golden Hurricane's head coach on November 24. Wide receivers coah and recruiting coordinator Ryan Switzer was named interim head coach for the team's final game. The Golden Hurricane's defense finished the season ranked 131 out of 133 FBS teams in total defense, allowing an average of 496.8 yards per game. Tulsa's defense also ranked last in passing defense, allowing 316.0 passing yards per game.

== Schedule ==
| Date | Time | Opponent | Site | TV | Result | Attendance |
|---|---|---|---|---|---|---|
| August 29 | 7:00 p.m. | Northwestern State* | H. A. Chapman Stadium; Tulsa, OK | ESPN+ | W 62–28 | 16,483 |
| September 7 | 6:00 p.m. | at Arkansas State* | Centennial Bank Stadium; Jonesboro, AR | ESPN+ | L 24–28 | 19,316 |
| September 14 | 11:00 a.m. | No. 13 Oklahoma State* | H. A. Chapman Stadium; Tulsa, OK (rivalry) | ESPN2 | L 10–45 | 30,915 |
| September 21 | 6:00 p.m. | at Louisiana Tech* | Joe Aillet Stadium; Ruston, LA | ESPN+ | W 23–20 ^{OT} | 18,152 |
| September 28 | 6:00 p.m. | at North Texas | DATCU Stadium; Denton, TX | ESPN+ | L 20–52 | 18,529 |
| October 5 | 11:00 a.m. | Army | H. A. Chapman Stadium; Tulsa, OK | ESPNU | L 7–49 | 24,409 |
| October 19 | 1:00 p.m. | at Temple | Lincoln Financial Field; Philadelphia, PA | ESPN+ | L 10–20 | 18,721 |
| October 26 | 2:30 p.m. | UTSA^{†} | H. A. Chapman Stadium; Tulsa, OK | ESPN+ | W 46–45 | 17,439 |
| November 2 | 1:30 p.m. | at UAB | Protective Stadium; Birmingham, AL | ESPN+ | L 21–59 | 17,944 |
| November 14 | 6:30 p.m. | East Carolina | H. A. Chapman Stadium; Tulsa, OK | ESPN | L 31–38 | 17,979 |
| November 23 | 2:30 p.m. | at South Florida | Raymond James Stadium; Tampa, FL | ESPN+ | L 30–63 | 27,623 |
| November 30 | 2:30 p.m. | Florida Atlantic | H. A. Chapman Stadium; Tulsa, OK | ESPN+ | L 16–63 | 15,243 |
*Non-conference game; ^{†}Homecoming; Rankings from AP Poll - Released prior to game; All times are in Central time

== Game summaries ==
=== Northwestern State (FCS) ===
Northwestern State Demons (FCS) (0–0) at Tulsa Golden Hurricane (0–0) – Game summary

| Quarter | 1 | 2 | 3 | 4 | Total |
|---|---|---|---|---|---|
| Demons (FCS) | 14 | 0 | 0 | 14 | 28 |
| Golden Hurricane | 14 | 27 | 7 | 14 | 62 |

at H. A. Chapman Stadium • Tulsa, Oklahoma

- Date: August 29th
- Game time: 7:00 p.m. CDT
- Game weather: Sunny • Temperature: 91 °F (33 °C) • Wind: SE at 8 miles per hour (13 km/h)
- Game attendance: 16,483
- Referee: Steven Anderson
- TV announcers (ESPN+): James Westling (play-by-play) and Leger Douzable (analyst)

Game information

First quarter

- (14:13) NWST – Kennieth Lacy 75 yard run, Reed Honshtein kick ('Drive: 2 plays, 75 yards, 0:47; Northwestern State 7–0)
- (9:40) TLSA – Kamdyn Benjamin 36 yard pass from Kirk Francis, Seth Morgan kick (Drive: 7 plays, 80 yards, 2:11; Tied 7–7)
- (7:19) TLSA – Kamdyn Benjamin 66 yard punt return, Seth Morgan kick (Tulsa 14–7)
- (1:06) NWST – Antonio Hall 74 yard missed field goal return, Reed Honshtein kick (Drive: 8 plays, 28 yards, 2:32; Tied 14–14)

Second quarter

- (12:34) TLSA – Jeremiah Ballard 29 yard pass from Kirk Francis, Seth Morgan kick (Drive: 9 plays, 73 yards, 3:03; Tulsa 21–14)
- (7:45) TLSA – Anthony Watkins 33 yard run, kick failed (Drive: 2 plays, 41 yards, 0:44; Tulsa 27–14)
- (4:16) TLSA – Connor Vaughn 20 yard pass from Kirk Francis, Seth Morgan kick (Drive: 5 plays, 52 yards, 2:23; Tulsa 34–14)
- (0:37) TLSA – Connor Vaughn 14 yard pass from Kirk Francis, Seth Morgan kick (Drive: 7 plays, 65 yards, 2:05; Tulsa 41–14)

Third quarter

- (11:22) TLSA – Braylin Presley 19 yard run, Seth Morgan kick (Drive: 7 plays, 75 yards, 3:38; Tulsa 48–14)

Fourth quarter

- (14:39) NWST – Myles Kitt-Denton 12 yard pass from Quaterius Hawkins, Reed Honshtein kick (Drive: 2 plays, 12 yards, 0:13; Tulsa 48–21)
- (14:28) TLSA – Lloyd Avant 100 yard kickoff return, Seth Morgan kick (Tulsa 55–21)
- (10:29) NWST – Chance Newman 4 yard run, Reed Honshtein kick (Drive: 7 plays, 76 yards, 3:52; Tulsa 55–28)
- (4:30) TLSA – Cardell Williams 22 yard run, Seth Morgan kick (Drive: 10 plays, 73 yards, 5:59; Tulsa 62–28)

| Statistics | NWST | TLSA |
|---|---|---|
| First downs | 12 | 31 |
| Plays–yards | 52–243 | 71–622 |
| Rushes–yards | 33–131 | 41–323 |
| Passing yards | 112 | 299 |
| Passing: Comp–Att–Int | 9–19–0 | 23–30–0 |
| Time of possession | 28:30 | 31:30 |

| Team | Category | Player | Statistics |
|---|---|---|---|
| Northwestern State | Passing | Quaterius Hawkins | 4/5, 57 yards, 1 TD |
| Northwestern State | Rushing | Kennieth Lacy | 7 carries, 72 yards, 1 TD |
| Northwestern State | Receiving | Amaaz Eugene | 2 receptions, 34 yards |
| Tulsa | Passing | Kirk Francis | 23/30, 299 yards, 4 TD |
| Tulsa | Rushing | Lloyd Avant | 11 carries, 64 yards |
| Tulsa | Receiving | Zion Steptoe | 5 receptions, 88 yards |

=== at Arkansas State ===
Tulsa Golden Hurricane (1–0) at Arkansas State Red Wolves (1–0) – Game summary

| Quarter | 1 | 2 | 3 | 4 | Total |
|---|---|---|---|---|---|
| Golden Hurricane | 3 | 14 | 7 | 0 | 24 |
| Red Wolves | 7 | 0 | 21 | 0 | 28 |

at Centennial Bank Stadium • Jonesboro, Arkansas

- Date: September 7th
- Game time: 6:00 p.m. CDT
- Game weather: Clear • Temperature: 76 °F (24 °C) • Wind: NE at 15 miles per hour (24 km/h)
- Game attendance: 19,316
- Referee: Charles Lamertina
- TV announcers (ESPN+): Matt Stolz (play-by-play), Darion Griswold (analyst)

Game information

First quarter

- (6:48) TLSA – Seth Morgan 29 yard field goal (Drive: 11 plays, 53 yards, 4:40; Tulsa 3–0)
- (4:45) ARST – Adam Jones 35 yard pass from Jaylen Raynor, Clune Van Andel kick (Drive: 5 plays, 84 yards, 1:57; Arkansas State 7–3)

Second quarter

- (8:57) TLSA – Kamdyn Benjamin 39 yard pass from Kirk Francis, Seth Morgan kick (Drive: 11 plays, 90 yards, 4:57; Tulsa 10–7)
- (2:35) TLSA – Cardell Williams 5 yard run, Seth Morgan kick (Drive: 5 plays, 31 yards, 2:01; Tulsa 17–7)

Third quarter

- (12:40) ARST – Jaylen Raynor 15 yard run, Clune Van Andel kick (Drive: 3 plays, 63 yards, 0:58; Tulsa 17–14)
- (10:53) ARST – Courtney Jackson 77 yard punt return, Clune Van Andel kick (Arkansas State 21–17)
- (9:42) TLSA – Anthony Watkins 2 yard run, Seth Morgan kick (Drive: 3 plays, 65 yards, 1:11; Tulsa 24–21)
- (3:30) ARST – Corey Rucker 5 yard pass from Jaylen Raynor, Clune Van Andel kick (Drive: 14 plays, 79 yards, 6:06; Arkansas State 28–24)

Fourth quarter

- No scoring plays

| Statistics | TLSA | ARST |
|---|---|---|
| First downs | 19 | 24 |
| Plays–yards | 61–362 | 75–396 |
| Rushes–yards | 32–163 | 43–141 |
| Passing yards | 199 | 255 |
| Passing: Comp–Att–Int | 16–29–1 | 21–32–1 |
| Time of possession | 25:37 | 34:23 |

| Team | Category | Player | Statistics |
|---|---|---|---|
| Tulsa | Passing | Kirk Francis | 16/28, 199 yards, 1 TD, 1 INT |
| Tulsa | Rushing | Lloyd Avant | 14 carries, 61 yards |
| Tulsa | Receiving | Kamdyn Benjamin | 6 receptions, 131 yards, 1 TD |
| Arkansas State | Passing | Jaylen Raynor | 21/32, 255 yards, 2 TD, 1 INT |
| Arkansas State | Rushing | Zak Wallace | 16 carries, 78 yards |
| Arkansas State | Receiving | Reagan Ealy | 6 receptions, 68 yards |

=== No. 13 Oklahoma State (rivalry) ===
No. 13 Oklahoma State Cowboys (2–0) at Tulsa Golden Hurricane (1–1) – Game summary

| Quarter | 1 | 2 | 3 | 4 | Total |
|---|---|---|---|---|---|
| No. 13 Cowboys | 7 | 21 | 10 | 7 | 45 |
| Golden Hurricane | 0 | 0 | 0 | 10 | 10 |

at H. A. Chapman Stadium • Tulsa, Oklahoma

- Date: September 14th
- Game time: 11:00 a.m. CDT
- Game weather: Sunny • Temperature: 78 °F (26 °C) • Wind: ESE at 12 miles per hour (19 km/h)
- Game attendance: 30,195
- Referee: Henry Johns
- TV announcers (ESPN2): Beth Mowins (play-by-play), Rod Gilmore (analyst), Lauren Sisler (sideline reporter)

Game information

First quarter

- (8:38) OKST – Brennan Presley 1 yard pass from Alan Bowman, Logan Ward kick (Drive: 16 plays, 75 yards, 6:22; Oklahoma State 7–0)

Second quarter

- (12:47) OKST – De'Zhaun Stribling 8 yard pass from Alan Bowman, Logan Ward kick (Drive: 10 plays, 65 yards, 4:58; Oklahoma State 14–0)
- (9:05) OKST – Taylyn Shettron 78 yard pass from Alan Bowman, Logan Ward kick (Drive: 3 plays, 89 yards, 1:18; Oklahoma State 21–0)
- (3:23) OKST – Josh Ford 18 yard pass from Alan Bowman, Logan Ward kick (Drive: 6 plays, 86 yards, 2:30; Oklahoma State 28–0)

Third quarter

- (8:19) OKST – De'Zhaun Stribling 63 yard pass from Alan Bowman, Logan Ward kick (Drive: 2 plays, 75 yards, 0:31; Oklahoma State 35–0)
- (1:53) OKST – Logan Ward 43 yard field goal (Drive: 4 plays, 3 yards, 2:11; Oklahoma State 38–0)

Fourth quarter

- (10:05) OKST – Sesi Vailahi 1 yard run, Logan Ward kick (Drive: 12 plays, 56 yards, 4:38; Oklahoma State 45–0)
- (6:15) TLSA – Seth Morgan 43 yard field goal (Drive: 9 plays, 50 yards, 3:50; Oklahoma State 45–3)
- (1:55) TLSA – Stephen Kittleman 9 yard run, Seth Morgan kick (Drive: 4 plays, 64 yards, 1:30; Oklahoma State 45–10)

| Statistics | OKST | TLSA |
|---|---|---|
| First downs | 24 | 19 |
| Plays–yards | 74–560 | 69–352 |
| Rushes–yards | 35–129 | 32–116 |
| Passing yards | 431 | 236 |
| Passing: Comp–Att–Int | 28–39–1 | 19–37–1 |
| Time of possession | 30:55 | 29:05 |

| Team | Category | Player | Statistics |
|---|---|---|---|
| Oklahoma State | Passing | Alan Bowman | 24/31, 396 yards, 5 TD, 1 INT |
| Oklahoma State | Rushing | Trent Howland | 10 carries, 53 yards |
| Oklahoma State | Receiving | De'Zhaun Stribling | 7 receptions, 174 yards, 2 TD |
| Tulsa | Passing | Kirk Francis | 14/31, 153 yards, 1 INT |
| Tulsa | Rushing | Anthony Watkins | 9 carries, 40 yards |
| Tulsa | Receiving | Kamdyn Benjamin | 6 receptions, 94 yards |

=== at Louisiana Tech ===
Tulsa Golden Hurricane (1–2) at Louisiana Tech Bulldogs (1–1) – Game summary

| Quarter | 1 | 2 | 3 | 4 | OT | Total |
|---|---|---|---|---|---|---|
| Golden Hurricane | 7 | 3 | 7 | 3 | 3 | 23 |
| Bulldogs | 0 | 7 | 0 | 13 | 0 | 20 |

at Joe Aillet Stadium • Ruston, Louisiana

- Date: September 21st
- Game time: 6:00 p.m. CDT
- Game weather: Sunny • Temperature: 91 °F (33 °C) • Wind: SE at 5 miles per hour (8.0 km/h)
- Game attendance: 18,152
- Referee: Reid Jackson
- TV announcers (ESPN+): Lyn Rollins (play-by-play), Chris Mycoskie (analyst) and Madison Kaufman (sideline)

Game information

First quarter

- TLSA – Anthony Watkins 30-yard run (Seth Morgan kick), 4:05. Golden Hurricane 7–0. Drive: 5 plays, 40 yards, 2:11.

Second quarter

- LT – Jimmy Holiday 1-yard run (Buck Buchanan kick), 11:50. Tied 7–7. Drive: 5 plays, 25 yards, 2:18.
- TLSA – Seth Morgan 32-yard field goal, 4:50. Golden Hurricane 10–7. Drive: 9 plays, 28 yards, 4:25.

Third quarter

- TLSA – Corey Smith 38-yard pass from Kirk Francis (Seth Morgan kick), 0:03. Golden Hurricane 17–7. Drive: 5 plays, 85 yards, 3:14.

Fourth quarter

- LT – Blake Baker 1-yard run (run failed), 12:08. Golden Hurricanes 17–13. Drive: 7 plays, 79 yards, 2:52.
- LT – Eli Finley 24-yard pass from Evan Bullock (Buck Buchanan kick), 3:14. Bulldogs 20–17. Drive: 5 plays, 43 yards, 1:41.
- TLSA – Seth Morgan 45-yard field goal, 0:32. Tied 20–20. Drive: 9 plays, 48 yards, 2:42.

Overtime

- TLSA – Seth Morgan 34-yard field goal. Golden Hurricane 23–20. Drive: 4 plays, 9 yards.

| Statistics | TLSA | LT |
|---|---|---|
| First downs | 14 | 17 |
| Plays–yards | 66–333 | 71–284 |
| Rushes–yards | 30–105 | 41–87 |
| Passing yards | 228 | 197 |
| Passing: Comp–Att–Int | 24–36–0 | 17–30–1 |
| Time of possession | 30:00 | 30:00 |

| Team | Category | Player | Statistics |
|---|---|---|---|
| Tulsa | Passing | Kirk Francis | 24/36, 228 yards, TD |
| Tulsa | Rushing | Anthony Watkins | 10 rushes, 60 yards, TD |
| Tulsa | Receiving | Kamdyn Benjamin | 8 receptions, 69 yards |
| Louisiana Tech | Passing | Blake Baker | 6/10, 107 yards, INT |
| Louisiana Tech | Rushing | Fred Robertson | 7 rushes, 39 yards |
| Louisiana Tech | Receiving | Eli Finley | 3 receptions, 91 yards, TD |

=== at North Texas ===
Tulsa Golden Hurricane (2–2) at North Texas Mean Green (3–1) – Game summary

| Quarter | 1 | 2 | 3 | 4 | Total |
|---|---|---|---|---|---|
| Golden Hurricane | 0 | 3 | 0 | 17 | 20 |
| Mean Green | 0 | 24 | 21 | 7 | 52 |

at DATCU Stadium • Denton, Texas

- Date: September 28th
- Game time: 6:30 p.m. CDT
- Game weather: Sunny • Temperature: 87 °F (31 °C) • Wind: S at 15 miles per hour (24 km/h)
- Game attendance: 18,529
- Referee: Steven Anderson
- TV announcers (ESPN+): James Westling (play-by-play), Leger Douzable (analyst) and Smacker Miles (sideline)

Game information

First quarter

No scoring plays

Second quarter

- (14:12) TLS – Seth Morgan 22-yard field goal (Drive: 11 plays, 58 yards, 3:51; Tulsa 3–0)
- (4:47) UNT – Blair Conwright 96-yard pass from Chandler Morris, Kali Nguma kick (Drive: 11 plays, 58 yards, 3:51; North Texas 7–3)
- (1:56) UNT – Kali Nguma 27-yard field goal (Drive: 6 plays, 40 yards, 2:00; North Texas 10–3)
- (1:28) UNT – Wyatt Young 1-yard run, Kali Nguma kick (Drive: 1 play, 1 yard, 0:05; North Texas 17–3)
- (0:06) UNT – Wyatt Young 26-yard pass from Chandler Morris, Kali Nguma kick (Drive: 2 plays, 41 yards, 0:15; North Texas 24–3)

Third quarter

- (12:05) UNT – DT Sheffield 27-yard pass from Chandler Morris, Kali Nguma kick (Drive: 8 plays, 64 yards, 2:49; North Texas 31–3)
- (8:31) UNT – Dalton Carnes 14-yard pass from Chandler Morris, Kali Nguma kick (Drive: 4 plays, 80 yards, 1:32; North Texas 38–3)
- (1:32) UNT – Kiefer Sibley 9-yard pass from Chandler Morris, Kali Nguma kick (Drive: 11 plays, 99 yards, 4:58; North Texas 45–3)

Fourth quarter

- (12:47) TLS – Seth Morgan 45-yard field goal (Drive: 11 plays, 48 yards, 3:45; North Texas 45–6)
- (12:35) UNT – Makenzie McGill II 75-yard run, Kali Nguma kick (Drive: 1 play, 75 yards, 0:12; North Texas 52–6)
- (7:29) TLS – Jack Wright 18-yard pass from Cooper Legas, Seth Morgan kick (Drive: 9 plays, 82 yards, 4:57; North Texas 52–13)
- (0:06) TLS – Connor Vaughn 5-yard pass from Tim Carpenter, Troop O'Neal kick (Drive: 12 plays, 71 yards, 3:31; North Texas 52–20)

| Statistics | TLSA | UNT |
|---|---|---|
| First downs | 27 | 21 |
| Plays–yards | 91–415 | 60–618 |
| Rushes–yards | 47–229 | 26–179 |
| Passing yards | 186 | 439 |
| Passing: Comp–Att–Int | 20–44–2 | 22–34–0 |
| Time of possession | 36:35 | 23:25 |

| Team | Category | Player | Statistics |
|---|---|---|---|
| Tulsa | Passing | Kirk Francis | 13/29, 101 yards, 2 INT |
| Tulsa | Rushing | Bill Jackson | 16 carries, 77 yards |
| Tulsa | Receiving | Kamdyn Benjamin | 7 receptions, 68 yards |
| North Texas | Passing | Chandler Morris | 22/34, 439 yards, 5 TD |
| North Texas | Rushing | Makenzie McGill II | 5 carries, 70 yards, TD |
| North Texas | Receiving | Blair Conwright | 2 receptions, 115 yards, TD |

=== Army ===
Army Black Knights (4–0) at Tulsa Golden Hurricane (2–3) – Game summary

| Quarter | 1 | 2 | 3 | 4 | Total |
|---|---|---|---|---|---|
| Black Knights | 7 | 14 | 21 | 7 | 49 |
| Golden Hurricane | 7 | 0 | 0 | 0 | 7 |

at H. A. Chapman Stadium • Tulsa, Oklahoma

- Date: October 5th
- Game time: 11:00 a.m. CDT
- Game weather: Sunny • Temperature: 79 °F (26 °C) • Wind: S at 10 miles per hour (16 km/h)
- Game attendance: 24,409
- Referee: Darryl DeBerry
- TV announcers (ESPNU): Courtney Lyle (play-by-play) and Rene Ingoglia (analyst)

Game information

First quarter

- (10:30) ARMY – Noah Short 37-yard pass from Bryson Daily, Trey Gronotte kick (Drive: 3 plays, 42 yards, 1:28; Army 7–0)
- (3:14) TLSA – Cooper Legas 1-yard run, Seth Morgan kick (Drive: 16 plays, 75 yards, 7:12; Tied 7–7)

Second quarter

- (5:02) ARMY – Bryson Daily 4-yard run, Trey Gronotte kick (Drive: 6 plays, 70 yards, 3:26; Army 14–7)
- (1:49) ARMY – Noah Short 58-yard pass from Bryson Daily, Trey Gronotte kick (Drive: 4 plays, 68 yards, 1:41; Army 21–7)

Third quarter

- (13:33) ARMY – Kanye Udoh 61-yard run, Trey Gronotte kick (Drive: 3 plays, 75 yards, 1:27; Army 28–7)
- (6:44) ARMY – Kanye Udoh 63-yard run, Trey Gronotte kick (Drive: 2 plays, 72 yards, 0:50; Army 35–7)
- (0:14) ARMY – Bryson Daily 27-yard run, Trey Gronotte kick (Drive: 8 plays, 53 yards, 4:53; Army 42–7)

Fourth quarter

- (7:40) ARMY – Dewayne Coleman 4-yard run, Trey Gronotte kick (Drive: 12 plays, 69 yards, 6:39; Army 49–7)

| Statistics | ARMY | TLSA |
|---|---|---|
| First downs | 18 | 17 |
| Plays–yards | 46–481 | 72–268 |
| Rushes–yards | 40–321 | 42–159 |
| Passing yards | 160 | 109 |
| Passing: Comp–Att–Int | 6–6–0 | 21–30–0 |
| Time of possession | 25:31 | 34:29 |

| Team | Category | Player | Statistics |
|---|---|---|---|
| Army | Passing | Bryson Daily | 5/5, 140 yards, 2 TD |
| Army | Rushing | Kanye Udoh | 6 carries, 137 yards, 2 TD |
| Army | Receiving | Noah Short | 3 receptions, 121 yards, 2 TD |
| Tulsa | Passing | Kirk Francis | 16/22, 84 yards |
| Tulsa | Rushing | Cooper Legas | 17 carries, 81 yards, TD |
| Tulsa | Receiving | Kamdyn Benjamin | 7 receptions, 44 yards |

=== at Temple ===
Tulsa Golden Hurricane (2–4) at Temple Owls (1–5) – Game summary

| Quarter | 1 | 2 | 3 | 4 | Total |
|---|---|---|---|---|---|
| Golden Hurricane | 0 | 0 | 10 | 0 | 10 |
| Owls | 3 | 14 | 0 | 3 | 20 |

at Lincoln Financial Field • Philadelphia, Pennsylvania

- Date: October 19th
- Game time: 1:00 p.m. CDT
- Game weather: Sunny • Temperature: 71 °F (22 °C) • Wind: NE 3 miles per hour (4.8 km/h)
- Game attendance: 18,721
- Referee: Reid Jackson
- TV announcers (ESPN+): Doug Sherman (play-by-play) and Barrett Brooks (analyst)

Game information

First quarter

- (3:20) TEM – Maddux Trujillo 29-yard field goal (Drive: 7 plays, 87 yards, 2:54; Temple 3–0)

Second quarter

- (12:55) TEM – Peter Clarke 3-yard pass from Evan Simon, Maddux Trujillo kick (Drive: 10 plays, 53 yards, 4:30; Temple 10–0)
- (4:23) TEM – Terrez Worthy 1-yard run, Maddux Trujillo kick (Drive: 11 plays, 92 yards, 5:32; Temple 17–0)

Third quarter

- (8:59) TUL – Anthony Watkins 63-yard pass from Kirk Francis, Seth Morgan kick (Drive: 3 plays, 88 yards, 1:30; Temple 17–7)
- (2:40) TUL – Seth Morgan 46-yard field goal (Drive: 9 plays, 50 yards, 4:35; Temple 17–10)

Fourth quarter

- (12:50) TEM – Maddux Trujillo 41-yard field goal (Drive: 14 plays, 59 yards, 4:30; Temple 20–10)

| Statistics | TLSA | TEM |
|---|---|---|
| First downs | 17 | 21 |
| Plays–yards | 58–240 | 75–397 |
| Rushes–yards | 31–75 | 28–81 |
| Passing yards | 165 | 316 |
| Passing: Comp–Att–Int | 14–27–1 | 31–47–1 |
| Time of possession | 25:32 | 34:12 |

| Team | Category | Player | Statistics |
|---|---|---|---|
| Tulsa | Passing | Kirk Francis | 11/23, 148 yards, TD, INT |
| Tulsa | Rushing | Anthony Watkins | 7 carries, 23 yards |
| Tulsa | Receiving | Anthony Watkins | 3 receptions, 73 yards, TD |
| Temple | Passing | Evan Simon | 3/46, 297 yards, TD, INT |
| Temple | Rushing | Terrez Worthy | 12 carries, 41 yards, TD |
| Temple | Receiving | Landon Morris | 4 receptions, 97 yards |

=== UTSA ===
UTSA Roadrunners (3–4) at Tulsa Golden Hurricane (2–5) – Game summary

| Quarter | 1 | 2 | 3 | 4 | Total |
|---|---|---|---|---|---|
| Roadrunners | 14 | 21 | 7 | 3 | 45 |
| Golden Hurricane | 0 | 7 | 17 | 22 | 46 |

at H. A. Chapman Stadium • Tulsa, Oklahoma

- Date: October 26th
- Game time: 2:30 p.m. CDT
- Game weather: Sunny
- Game attendance: 17,439
- Referee: Tim Rich
- TV announcers (ESPN+): James Westling (play-by-play) and Leger Douzable (analyst)

Game information

First quarter

- (9:35) UTSA – Oscar Cardenas 9-yard pass from Owen McCown, Tate Sandell kick (Drive: 9 plays, 46 yards, 3:28; UTSA 7–0)
- (1:57) UTSA – Chris Carpenter 69-yard pass from Owen McCown, Tate Sandell kick (Drive: 2 plays, 72 yards, 0:24; UTSA 14–0)

Second quarter

- (13:54) UTSA – Dan Dishman 23-yard pass from Owen McCown (Drive: 2 plays, 31 yards, 0:27; UTSA 20–0)
- (11:58) TLSA – Bill Jackson 31-yard pass from Cooper Legas, Seth Morgan kick (Drive: 6 plays, 75 yards, 1:56; UTSA 20–7)
- (9:00) UTSA – Robert Henry 9-yard run, Tate Sandell kick (Drive: 7 plays, 75 yards, 2:58; UTSA 27–7)
- (1:01) UTSA – Daemian Wimberly 28-yard fumble recovery, Patrick Overmyer pass (UTSA 35–7)

Third quarter

- (11:52) TLSA – Amieh Williams 35-yard fumble recovery, Seth Morgan kick (UTSA 35–14)
- (7:59) TLSA – Seth Morgan 37-yard field goal (Drive: 5 plays, 36 yards, 1:14; UTSA 35–17)
- (5:30) UTSA – Willie McCoy 5-yard pass from Owen McCown, Tate Sandell kick (Drive: 7 plays, 75 yards, 2:29; UTSA 42–17)
- (4:50) TLSA – Kamdyn Benjamin 74-yard pass from Cooper Legas, Seth Morgan kick (Drive: 2 plays, 75 yards, 0:40; UTSA 42–24)

Fourth quarter

- (14:21) TLSA – Viron Ellison Jr. 4-yard pass from Cooper Legas, Cooper Legas rush (Drive: 8 plays, 67 yards, 2:49; UTSA 42–32)
- (5:21) UTSA – Tate Sandell 37-yard field goal (Drive: 14 plays, 61 yards, 6:01; UTSA 45–32)
- (2:26) TLSA – Kamdyn Benjamin 20-yard pass from Cooper Legas, Seth Morgan kick (Drive: 10 plays, 75 yards, 2:55; UTSA 45–39)
- (1:01) TLSA – Kamdyn Benjamin 4-yard pass from Cooper Legas, Seth Morgan kick (Drive: 8 plays, 92 yards, 1:01; Tulsa 46–45)

| Statistics | UTSA | TLSA |
|---|---|---|
| First downs | 26 | 21 |
| Plays–yards | 91–546 | 80–433 |
| Rushes–yards | 40–103 | 36–63 |
| Passing yards | 443 | 370 |
| Passing: Comp–Att–Int | 31–51–0 | 24–44–0 |
| Time of possession | 33:50 | 26:10 |

| Team | Category | Player | Statistics |
|---|---|---|---|
| UTSA | Passing | Owen McCown | 30/50, 434 yards, 4 TD |
| UTSA | Rushing | Robert Henry | 20 carries, 67 yards, TD |
| UTSA | Receiving | Houston Thomas | 6 receptions, 132 yards |
| Tulsa | Passing | Cooper Legas | 16/31, 333 yards, 5 TD |
| Tulsa | Rushing | Cooper Legas | 13 carries, 46 yards |
| Tulsa | Receiving | Kamdyn Benjamin | 7 receptions, 125 yards, 3 TD |

=== at UAB ===
Tulsa Golden Hurricane (3–5) at UAB Blazers (1–6) – Game summary

| Quarter | 1 | 2 | 3 | 4 | Total |
|---|---|---|---|---|---|
| Golden Hurricane | 0 | 7 | 7 | 7 | 21 |
| Blazers | 21 | 24 | 14 | 0 | 59 |

at Protective Stadium • Birmingham, Alabama

- Date: November 2nd
- Game time: 12:30 p.m. CDT
- Game weather: Cloudy • Temperature: 75 °F (24 °C) • Wind: W 4 miles per hour (6.4 km/h)
- Game attendance: 17,944
- Referee: Charles Lamertina
- TV announcers (ESPN+): Courtney Lyle (play-by-play), Leger Douzable (analyst) and Smacker Miles (sideline)

Game information

First quarter

- (12:44) UAB – Armoni Goodwin 20-yard pass from Harrison Barker, Jonah Delange kick (Drive: 5 plays, 75 yards, 2:16; UAB 7–0)
- (8:51) UAB – Bryce Damous 14-yard pass from Jalen Kitna, Jonah Delange kick (Drive: 6 plays, 47 yards, 2:59; UAB 14–0)
- (3:13) UAB – Amare Thomas 16-yard pass from Jalen Kitna, Jonah Delange kick (Drive: 2 plays, 17 yards, 0:44; UAB 21–0)

Second quarter

- (14:50) UAB – Kam Shanks 67-yard pass from Jalen Kitna, Jonah Delange kick (Drive: 5 plays, 73 yards, 1:36; UAB 28–0)
- (9:07) UAB – Jonah Delange 52-yard field goal (Drive: 6 plays, 17 yards, 2:25; UAB 31–0)
- (7:30) UAB – Kam Shanks 58-yard punt return, Jonah Delange kick (UAB 38–0)
- (2:25) UAB – Amare Thomas 15-yard pass from Jalen Kitna, Jonah Delange kick (Drive: 7 plays, 70 yards, 3:40; UAB 45–0)
- (0:17) TLSA – Joseph Williams 13-yard pass from Cooper Legas, Seth Morgan kick (Drive: 7 plays, 50 yards, 0:43; UAB 45–7)

Third quarter

- (8:47) TLSA – Bill Jackson 16-yard pass from Cooper Legas, Seth Morgan kick (Drive: 16 plays, 75 yards, 6:13; UAB 45–14)
- (7:30) UAB – Kam Shanks 34-yard pass from Jalen Kitna, Jonah Delange kick (Drive: 3 plays, 55 yards, 1:07; UAB 52–14)
- (1:00) UAB – Kam Shanks 48-yard pass from Jalen Kitna, Jonah Delange kick (Drive: 8 plays, 84 yards, 3:55; UAB 59–14)

Fourth quarter

- (0:24) TLSA – Corey Smith 6-yard pass from Tim Carpenter, Seth Morgan kick (Drive: 8 plays, 76 yards, 1:25; UAB 59–21)

| Statistics | TLSA | UAB |
|---|---|---|
| First downs | 24 | 23 |
| Plays–yards | 90–423 | 60–537 |
| Rushes–yards | 49–187 | 23–113 |
| Passing yards | 236 | 424 |
| Passing: Comp–Att–Int | 22–41–1 | 27–37–0 |
| Time of possession | 31:50 | 28:10 |

| Team | Category | Player | Statistics |
|---|---|---|---|
| Tulsa | Passing | Cooper Legas | 21/38, 230 yards, 2 TD, INT |
| Tulsa | Rushing | Viron Ellison Jr. | 12 carries, 73 yards |
| Tulsa | Receiving | Joseph Williams | 6 receptions, 112 yards, TD |
| UAB | Passing | Jalen Kitna | 25/32, 404 yards, 6 TD |
| UAB | Rushing | Lee Beebe Jr. | 10 carries, 34 yards |
| UAB | Receiving | Kam Shanks | 5 receptions, 153 yards, 3 TD |

=== East Carolina ===
East Carolina Pirates (5–4) at Tulsa Golden Hurricane (3–6) – Game summary

| Quarter | 1 | 2 | 3 | 4 | Total |
|---|---|---|---|---|---|
| Pirates | 7 | 10 | 7 | 14 | 38 |
| Golden Hurricane | 3 | 14 | 7 | 7 | 31 |

at H. A. Chapman Stadium • Tulsa, Oklahoma

- Date: November 14th
- Game time: 6:30 p.m. CST
- Game weather: Sunny
- Game attendance: 17,979
- Referee: Reid Jackson
- TV announcers (ESPN): Matt Barrie (play-by-play), Dan Mullen (analyst) and Harry Lyles Jr. (sideline)

Game information

First quarter

- (11:21) TLSA – Seth Morgan 47-yard field goal (Drive: 9 plays, 42 yards, 3:32; Tulsa 3–0)
- (5:37) ECU – Winston Wright Jr. 4-yard pass from Katin Houser, Andrew Conrad kick (Drive: 4 plays, 80 yards, 1:22; East Carolina 7–3)

Second quarter

- (7:00) ECU – Marion Gunn Jr. 1-yard run, Andrew Conrad kick (Drive: 7 plays, 68 yards, 2:25; East Carolina 14–3)
- (1:51) TLSA – Joseph Williams 39-yard pass from Cooper Legas, Seth Morgan kick (Drive: 11 plays, 76 yards, 5:02; East Carolina 14–10)
- (1:32) TLSA – Keuan Parker 30-yard interception, Seth Morgan kick (Tulsa 17–14)
- (0:00) ECU – Andrew Conrad 52-yard field goal (Drive: 7 plays, 38 yards, 0:38; Tied 17–17)

Third quarter

- (8:48) ECU – London Montgomery 16-yard run, Andrew Conrad kick (Drive: 4 plays, 52 yards, 1:13; East Carolina 24–17)
- (1:15) TLSA – Joseph Williams 14-yard pass from Cooper Legas, Seth Morgan kick (Drive: 5 plays, 58 yards, 2:01; Tied 24–24)

Fourth quarter

- (12:14) TLSA – Joseph Williams 50-yard pass from Cooper Legas, Seth Morgan kick (Drive: 6 plays, 64 yards, 2:00; Tulsa 31–24)
- (5:30) ECU – Rahjai Harris 23-yard run (Drive: 10 plays, 65 yards, 4:09; Tulsa 31–30)
- (2:07) ECU – Rahjai Harris 24-yard run, Rahjai Harris rush (Drive: 6 plays, 72 yards, 2:28; East Carolina 38–31)

| Statistics | ECU | TLSA |
|---|---|---|
| First downs | 27 | 19 |
| Plays–yards | 79–536 | 69–399 |
| Rushes–yards | 42–222 | 36–106 |
| Passing yards | 314 | 293 |
| Passing: Comp–Att–Int | 24–37–3 | 20–33–1 |
| Time of possession | 28:53 | 31:07 |

| Team | Category | Player | Statistics |
|---|---|---|---|
| East Carolina | Passing | Katin Houser | 24/37, 314 yards, TD, 3 INT |
| East Carolina | Rushing | Rahjai Harris | 18 carries, 114 yards, 2 TD |
| East Carolina | Receiving | Anthony Smith | 3 receptions, 84 yards |
| Tulsa | Passing | Cooper Legas | 20/32, 293 yards, 3 TD, INT |
| Tulsa | Rushing | Cooper Legas | 13 carries, 43 yards |
| Tulsa | Receiving | Joseph Williams | 5 receptions, 158 yards, 3 TD |

=== at South Florida ===
Tulsa Golden Hurricane (3–7) at South Florida Bulls (5–5) – Game summary

| Quarter | 1 | 2 | 3 | 4 | Total |
|---|---|---|---|---|---|
| Golden Hurricane | 0 | 7 | 0 | 23 | 30 |
| Bulls | 28 | 14 | 7 | 14 | 63 |

at Raymond James Stadium • Tampa, Florida

- Date: November 23rd
- Game time: 2:30 p.m. CST
- Game weather: Sunny • Temperature: 69 °F (21 °C) • Wind: SE 8 miles per hour (13 km/h)
- Game attendance: 27,623
- Referee: Steven Anderson
- TV announcers (ESPN+): Jason Ross Jr. (play-by-play) and Tyoka Jackson (analyst)

Game information

First quarter

- (14:19) USF – Kelley Joiner 48-yard run, John Cannon kick (Drive: 3 plays, 75 yards, 0:41; South Florida 7–0)
- (10:32) USF – Nay'Quan Wright 1-yard run, John Cannon kick (Drive: 10 plays, 55 yards, 2:55; South Florida 14–0)
- (6:15) USF – Kelley Joiner 1-yard run, John Cannon kick (Drive: 4 plays, 40 yards, 1:19; South Florida 21–0)
- (4:13) USF – Bryce Archie 6-yard run, John Cannon kick (Drive: 4 plays, 34 yards, 0:53; South Florida 28–0)

Second quarter

- (11:41) USF – Keshaun Singleton 58-yard pass from Bryce Archie, John Cannon kick (Drive: 7 plays, 94 yards, 2:38; South Florida 35–0)
- (8:20) TUL – Joseph Williams 11-yard pass from Cooper Legas, Seth Morgan kick (Drive: 9 plays, 75 yards, 3:21; South Florida 35–7)
- (2:11) USF – Payten Singletary 16-yard pass from Bryce Archie, John Cannon kick (Drive: 10 plays, 47 yards, 2:27; South Florida 42–7)

Third quarter

- (8:47) USF – Ta'Ron Keith 30-yard run, John Cannon kick (Drive: 3 plays, 41 yards, 0:59; South Florida 49–7)

Fourth quarter

- (11:45) TUL – Viron Ellison Jr. 1-yard run, Seth Morgan kick (Drive: 11 plays, 60 yards, 4:27; South Florida 49–14)
- (8:23) USF – Michael Brown-Stephens 20-yard pass from Israel Carter, John Cannon kick (Drive: 8 plays, 75 yards, 3:22; South Florida 56–14)
- (5:03) TUL – Lloyd Avant 10-yard run, Scott Stanford rush (Drive: 7 plays, 75 yards, 3:20; South Florida 56–22)
- (3:22) USF – Jonathan Echols 59-yard pass from Israel Carter, John Cannon kick (Drive: 3 plays, 65 yards, 1:41; South Florida 63–22)
- (2:37) TUL – Anthony Watkins 1-yard run, Joseph Williams pass (Drive: 2 plays, 15 yards, 0:29; South Florida 63–30)

| Statistics | TLSA | USF |
|---|---|---|
| First downs | 21 | 31 |
| Plays–yards | 81–478 | 91–715 |
| Rushes–yards | 47–223 | 52–308 |
| Passing yards | 255 | 407 |
| Passing: Comp–Att–Int | 16–34–3 | 27–39–1 |
| Time of possession | 28:57 | 31:03 |

| Team | Category | Player | Statistics |
|---|---|---|---|
| Tulsa | Passing | Cooper Legas | 10/25, 113 yards, TD, 3 INT |
| Tulsa | Rushing | Anthony Watkins | 15 carries, 101 yards, TD |
| Tulsa | Receiving | Joseph Williams | 6 receptions, 126 yards, TD |
| South Florida | Passing | Bryce Archie | 21/31, 305 yards, 2 TD, INT |
| South Florida | Rushing | Kelley Joiner | 10 carries, 131 yards, 2 TD |
| South Florida | Receiving | Keshaun Singleton | 5 receptions, 96 yards, TD |

=== Florida Atlantic ===
Florida Atlantic Owls (2–9) at Tulsa Golden Hurricane (3–8) – Game summary

| Quarter | 1 | 2 | 3 | 4 | Total |
|---|---|---|---|---|---|
| Owls | 0 | 0 | 0 | 0 | 0 |
| Golden Hurricane | 0 | 0 | 0 | 0 | 0 |

at H. A. Chapman Stadium • Tulsa, Oklahoma

- Date: November 30th
- Game time: 2:30 p.m. CST
- TV announcers (ESPN+): James Westling (play-by-play), Patrick Murray (analyst) and Smacker Miles (sideline)

Game information

First quarter

Second quarter

Third quarter

Fourth quarter

| Statistics | FAU | TLSA |
|---|---|---|
| First downs | | |
| Plays–yards | – | – |
| Rushes–yards | – | – |
| Passing yards | | |
| Passing: Comp–Att–Int | –– | –– |
| Time of possession | | |

| Team | Category | Player | Statistics |
|---|---|---|---|
| Florida Atlantic | Passing | | |
| Florida Atlantic | Rushing | | |
| Florida Atlantic | Receiving | | |
| Tulsa | Passing | | |
| Tulsa | Rushing | | |
| Tulsa | Receiving | | |

== Roster ==
2024 Tulsa Golden Hurricane football team roster
Players
Coaches
Offense

| Pos. | # | Name | Class |
|---|---|---|---|
| WR | 1 | Braylin Presley | Jr |
| QB | 2 | Cardell Williams | RSo |
| RB | 3 | Bill Jackson II | RJr |
| WR | 4 | Alex Green | Fr |
| QB | 5 | Cooper Legas | GS |
| WR | 6 | Jacob Emmers | Fr |
| WR | 7 | Zion Steptoe | RSo |
| WR | 8 | Joseph Williams | Fr |
| QB | 9 | Stephen Kittleman | RJr |
| QB | 10 | Tim Carpenter | Fr |
| QB | 11 | Kirk Francis | RFr |
| QB | 12 | Nate Ratcliff | RSo |
| WR | 12 | Corey Smith | Fr |
| WR | 13 | Jeremiah Ballard | Jr |
| QB | 15 | Carson Horton | RFr |
| WR | 15 | Josh Smith | Fr |
| QB | 16 | Jackson Johnson | RFr |
| WR | 18 | Kamdyn Benjamin | GS |
| WR | 19 | Grayson Tempest | So |
| RB | 21 | Cam Crooks | RFr |
| RB | 22 | Viron Ellison Jr. | Fr |
| RB | 23 | Anthony Watkins | GS |
| WR | 24 | Matthew Ogunrin | RFr |
| RB | 25 | Lloyd Avant | Fr |
| WR | 26 | Eli Potts | RSo |
| RB | 28 | Jayce Morgan | RSo |
| RB | 32 | Keigan Powers | So |
| WR | 35 | Mari Smith | RFr |
| TE | 41 | Camden Peck | RFr |
| TE | 42 | Ty Vinson | Fr |
| TE | 47 | Ethan Hall | GS |
| TE | 48 | Daegen Jensen | RFr |
| OL | 50 | Ender Aguilar | RJr |
| OL | 51 | Tautai Lio Marks | RSr |
| OL | 52 | Kasen Carpenter | RFr |
| OL | 53 | Ross Johnston | Fr |
| OL | 54 | Walter Young Bear | RJr |
| OL | 56 | Colten Christian | Fr |
| OL | 61 | Bennett Ringleb | RFr |
| OL | 62 | Cole Edrich | Fr |
| OL | 65 | Rey Burnett Jr. | RSr |
| OL | 66 | Will Morris | RFr |
| OL | 70 | Kaden Stanton | RFr |
| OL | 74 | Jacob Waller | RSo |
| OL | 75 | Jack Tanner | Fr |
| OL | 76 | Josh Love | Fr |
| OL | 77 | Brody Duffel | Fr |
| OL | 78 | Daniel Ademisoye | RSo |
| TE | 82 | Connor Vaughn | RSo |
| TE | 84 | Jewlyen Roberts | Fr |
| WR | 85 | Cole Greene | RFr |
| TE | 87 | Luke McGary | So |
| TE | 88 | Jackson Ford | Fr |
| WR | 89 | Jack Wright | GS |

Defense

| Pos. | # | Name | Class |
|---|---|---|---|
| LB | 0 | Myles Jackson | RSr |
| S | 1 | Dayne Hodge | RJr |
| S | 2 | Jehlen Cannady | RSr |
| CB | 3 | Champ Lewis | RSo |
| CB | 4 | Tyree Carlisle | RSr |
| CB | 5 | Keuan Parker | RJr |
| S | 6 | Malachai Jones | RSr |
| CB | 7 | Elijah Green | Fr |
| S | 8 | Issac Covington | Fr |
| S | 9 | Dax Collins | Fr |
| S | 10 | Sean O'Keefe | RSr |
| DB | 11 | Demarco Jones | GS |
| CB | 12 | Dedaunte Scott | Fr |
| CB | 13 | NuNu Campbell | RSo |
| S | 15 | Ashton Williams | Fr |
| S | 16 | Devin Robinson | RFr |
| S | 18 | Zach Williams | Fr |
| LB | 19 | Gavin Potter | GS |
| DE | 20 | Will Smith | Fr |
| LB | 21 | Zach Marcheselli | GS |
| LB | 22 | Chris Thompson | GS |
| S | 23 | Canon Peters | RJr |
| S | 24 | Buddha Garrett | Fr |
| LB | 25 | Connor Cook | RSo |
| LB | 26 | Zach Neilsen | RSo |
| S | 27 | Zane Woodham | So |
| CB | 29 | Georderrial Williams | RJr |
| LB | 30 | Maruio White Jr. | Fr |
| DE | 32 | Vontroy Malone | RSo |
| LB | 33 | William Alexander | Jr |
| LB | 34 | Elijah Wilson | RFr |
| LB | 35 | C.J. Turner III | RFr |
| CB | 37 | Brant McNear | RFr |
| LB | 38 | Stockton Ryan | RSo |
| S | 39 | Tyler Hughes | Fr |
| LB | 40 | Aquavious Dunbar | Fr |
| DE | 41 | Will Upshaw | Fr |
| LB | 42 | Jaxon Lee | Fr |
| S | 43 | Bryson Rouse | RFr |
| DL | 44 | Mason Fleming | Fr |
| LB | 46 | Walker Diharce | Fr |
| LB | 49 | Eli McWilliams | RSo |
| LB | 50 | Marshall Hefner | Fr |
| LB | 51 | Connor Phelps | Fr |
| DL | 52 | Duvan Boshoff | RSo |
| LB | 53 | Caleb Bowers | Fr |
| LB | 54 | Cade Lopez | RJr |
| DE | 55 | Owen Ostroski | RJr |
| DL | 56 | Nathan Price | Fr |
| DL | 57 | Austin LaRue | RFr |
| DL | 58 | Tyler Rich | RFr |
| DL | 72 | Tai Newhouse | RSo |
| DL | 90 | Joe Hjelle | Jr |
| DL | 92 | Amieh Williams | GS |
| DE | 93 | Luke Berry | RFr |
| DE | 94 | Justin Lohrenz | RJr |
| DL | 95 | R.J. Jackson Jr. | So |
| DL | 97 | Brody Reese | RJr |
| DL | 98 | Denver Hanna | RSo |

Special teams

| Pos. | # | Name | Class |
|---|---|---|---|
| K | 11 | Seth Morgan | GS |
| K | 18 | Michael Slaba | RSo |
| P | 29 | Angus Davies | So |
| P | 32 | Scott Stanford | RSo |
| K | 33 | Reed Malphurs | RFr |
| LS | 34 | Parker Stone | RJr |
| P | 44 | Henry Simon | Fr |
| LS | 46 | Caleb Matthews | RJr |
| K | 90 | Nate Long | GS |
| K | 91 | Troop O'Neal | Fr |
| K | 95 | Evan Guenthner | RFr |

Head coach

- Kevin Wilson
  Head Coach

Coordinators/assistant coaches

- Steve Spurrier Jr.
  Associate Head Coach
  Offensive coordinator
  Running Backs Coach
- Ron Burton
  Associate Head Coach
  Defensive Line Coach
- Chris Polizzi
  Defensive coordinator
  Safeties Coach
- Joe Bolden
  Co-Defensive Run Game Coordinator
  Special Teams Coordinator
  JACKS Coach
- Corey Dennis
  Passing Game Coordinator
  Quarterbacks Coach
- Greg Frey
  Offensive Line Coach
- Adrian Mayes
  Run Game Coordinator
  Tight Ends Coach
- Koy McFarland
  Linebackers Coach
- Ryan Switzer
  Recruiting Coordinator
  Wide Receivers Coach
- Dominique Franks
  Cornerbacks Coach
- Cody Scribner
  Defensive Quality Control
- Lance Dunbar
  Offensive Quality Control
- Mason Farquhar
  Offensive Graduate Assistant
- Brandyn Monahan
  Offensive Graduate Assistant
- Nick Ast
  Offensive Graduate Assistant
- Adam Martin
  Defensive Graduate Assistant
- Luke Kerver
  Special Teams Intern
- Ravi Savitala
  Director of Football Operations
- Logan Armstrong
  Director of Player Personnel & Recruiting
- Tom Ososkie
  Special Projects
- Marlee Wilson
  Administrative Graduate Assistant

Legend

- (C) Team captain
- (S) Suspended
- (I) Ineligible
- Injured
- Redshirt

Roster
