= 2024 UTSA Roadrunners football team =

American college football season

2024 UTSA Roadrunners football

Myrtle Beach Bowl champion

Myrtle Beach Bowl, W 44–15 vs. Coastal Carolina
- Conference: American Athletic Conference
- Record: 7–6 (4–4 AAC)
- Head coach: Jeff Traylor (5th season)
- Offensive coordinator: Justin Burke (2nd season)
- Offensive scheme: Multiple
- Defensive coordinator: Jess Loepp (4th season)
- Base defense: 3–4
- Home stadium: Alamodome

2024 American Athletic Conference football standings
	Conf.			Overall
Team	W		L	W		L
No. 21 Army y$	8	–	0	12	–	2
Tulane y	7	–	1	9	–	5
Navy	6	–	2	10	–	3
No. 24 Memphis	6	–	2	11	–	2
East Carolina	5	–	3	8	–	5
South Florida	4	–	4	7	–	6
UTSA	4	–	4	7	–	6
Charlotte	4	–	4	5	–	7
North Texas	3	–	5	6	–	7
Rice	3	–	5	4	–	8
Temple	2	–	6	3	–	9
UAB	2	–	6	3	–	9
Florida Atlantic	1	–	7	3	–	9
Tulsa	1	–	7	3	–	9
Championship: Army 35, Tulane 14
$ – Conference champion; y – Championship game participant; Rankings from AP Poll

The 2024 UTSA Roadrunners football team represented the University of Texas at San Antonio in the American Athletic Conference (AAC) during the 2024 NCAA Division I FBS football season. The Roadrunners were led by Jeff Traylor in his fifth year as the head coach. The Roadrunners played their home games at the Alamodome, located in San Antonio.

== Preseason ==
=== AAC media poll ===
The American Athletic Conference released its media prediction poll on July 23, 2024. The Roadrunners were predicted to finish second in the conference.

== Offseason ==
=== NFL departures ===
Name	Pos.	NFL team	Type
Joshua Cephus	WR	Jacksonville Jaguars	Free Agent Signing
Brandon Matterson	DE	Denver Broncos	Free Agent Signing
Rashad Wisdom	S	Tampa Bay Buccaneers	Free Agent Signing

=== Outgoing transfers ===
Over the off-season, UTSA has lost fifteen players through the NCAA transfer portal. Ten are currently committed while the remainder are still actively pursuing new schools.

Name	Pos.	New school
Trey Moore	EDGE	Texas
Xavier Spencer	CB	Southern
Syrus Dumas	CB	Withdrawn
Kyle Eaves	WR	TBD
Kaedric Cobbs	RB	Bryant
Daniel Ogundipe	OT	FIU
Je'Vaun Dabon	S	TBD
Cinque Williams	S	Austin Peay
Kam Alexander	CB	Oregon
Avery Morris	LB	New Mexico State
Rodney Groce Jr.	LB	Ole Miss
Dywan Griffin	CB	Old Dominion
Kamron Scott	IOL	TBD
Pig Cage	S	Louisiana Tech
Isaiah Davis	WR	Stephen F. Austin

=== Incoming transfers ===
Over the off-season, UTSA added twelve players through the transfer portal.

Name	Pos.	Class	Previous school
Ian Jackson	LB	RS-So	Alabama
Jaylen Garth	OT	RS-So	Houston
Brevin Randle	RB	Sr	Louisiana Tech
Denver Harris	CB	So	LSU
CJ James	IOL	RS-Jr	New Mexico
Jermarius Lewis	S	So	New Mexico
Zach Morris	CB	So	New Mexico
Kamar Missouri	OT	Jr	Rutgers
Daemian Wimberly	DL	Fr	SMU
Jimmy Wyrick	S	Jr	Stanford
DJ Allen	WR	RS-Fr	TCU
JJ Sparkman	WR	Jr	Texas Tech

== Schedule ==
UTSA and The American announced the 2024 football schedule on February 29, 2024.

Date	Time	Opponent	Site	TV	Result	Attendance
August 31	2:30 p.m.	Kennesaw State*	Alamodome; San Antonio, TX	ESPN+	W 28–16	25,911
September 7	3:00 p.m.	at Texas State*	UFCU Stadium; San Marcos, TX (I-35 Rivalry)	ESPNU	L 10–49	28,000
September 14	6:00 p.m.	at No. 2 Texas*	Darrell K Royal–Texas Memorial Stadium; Austin, TX	ESPN	L 7–56	101,892
September 21	2:30 p.m.	Houston Christian*	Alamodome; San Antonio, TX	ESPN+	W 45–7	20,973
September 28	3:00 p.m.	at East Carolina	Dowdy–Ficklen Stadium; Greenville, NC	ESPN+	L 20–30	41,851
October 12	6:00 p.m.	at Rice	Rice Stadium; Houston, TX	ESPN+	L 27–29	18,660
October 19	2:30 p.m.	Florida Atlantic^{†}	Alamodome; San Antonio, TX	ESPN+	W 38–24	20,802
October 26	2:30 p.m.	at Tulsa	Skelly Field at H. A. Chapman Stadium; Tulsa, OK	ESPN+	L 45–46	17,439
November 2	11:00 a.m.	Memphis	Alamodome; San Antonio, TX	ESPN2	W 44–36	17,198
November 15	7:00 p.m.	North Texas	Alamodome; San Antonio, TX	ESPN2	W 48–27	21,350
November 22	6:00 p.m.	Temple	Alamodome; San Antonio, TX	ESPN2	W 51–27	20,121
November 30	11:00 a.m.	at Army	Michie Stadium; West Point, NY	CBSSN	L 24–29	22,120
December 23	10:00 a.m.	at Coastal Carolina*	Brooks Stadium; Conway, SC (Myrtle Beach Bowl)	ESPN	W 44–15	8,164
*Non-conference game; ^{†}Homecoming; Rankings from AP Poll - Released prior to game; All times are in Central time

== Game summaries ==
=== Kennesaw State ===
Kennesaw State Owls (0–0) at UTSA Roadrunners (0–0) – Game summary

Quarter	1	2	3	4	Total
Owls	3	3	3	7	16
Roadrunners	14	7	0	7	28

at Alamodome • San Antonio, Texas

- Date: August 31st
- Game time: 2:30 p.m. CDT
- Game weather: None (played indoors)
- Game attendance: 25,911
- Referee: Gary Leeper
- TV announcers (ESPN+): Jack Benjamin (play-by-play) and LaDarrin McLane (analyst)

Game information

First quarter

- (12:00) UTSA – Devin McCuin 2 yard pass from Owen McCown, Chase Allen kick (Drive: 8 plays, 53 yards, 2:55; UTSA 7–0)
- (6:12) KENN – Austin Welch 48 yard field goal (Drive: 12 plays, 44 yards, 5:48; UTSA 7–3)
- (1:13) UTSA – Owen McCown 5 yard run, Chase Allen kick (Drive: 11 plays, 75 yards, 4:59; UTSA 14–3)

Second quarter

- (10:40) UTSA – Devin McCuin 4 yard pass from Owen McCown, Chase Allen kick (Drive: 8 plays, 80 yards, 4:11; UTSA 21–3)
- (0:59) KENN – Austin Welch 34 yard field goal (Drive: 7 plays, 48 yards, 1:41; UTSA 21–6)

Third quarter

- (2:06) KENN – Austin Welch 31 yard field goal (Drive: 12 plays, 74 yards, 7:21; UTSA 21–9)

Fourth quarter

- (9:23) KENN – Carson Kent 25 yard pass from Davis Bryson, Austin Welch kick (Drive: 6 plays, 55 yards, 3:07; UTSA 21–16)
- (3:52) UTSA – Oscar Cardenas 3 yard pass from Owen McCown, Chase Allen kick (Drive: 9 plays, 44 yards, 3:44; UTSA 28–16)

Statistics	KENN	UTSA
First downs	15	17
Plays–yards	67–253	72–416
Rushes–yards	39–51	34–76
Passing yards	202	340
Passing: Comp–Att–Int	14–28–0	28–38–0
Time of possession	29:00	31:00

Team	Category	Player	Statistics
Kennesaw State	Passing	Davis Bryson	14/28, 202 yards, 1 TD
Kennesaw State	Rushing	Qua Ashley	10 carries, 26 yards
Kennesaw State	Receiving	Qua Ashley	1 reception, 51 yards
UTSA	Passing	Owen McCown	28/38, 340 yards, 3 TD
UTSA	Rushing	Robert Henry Jr.	6 carries, 30 yards
UTSA	Receiving	Devin McCuin	11 receptions, 79 yards, 2 TD

=== at Texas State (I-35 Rivalry) ===
UTSA Roadrunners (1–0) at Texas State Bobcats (1–0) – Game summary

Quarter	1	2	3	4	Total
Roadrunners	3	0	7	0	10
Bobcats	14	21	7	7	49

at Bobcat Stadium • San Marcos, Texas

- Date: September 7th
- Game time: 3:00 p.m. CDT
- Game weather: Sunny • Temperature: 88 °F (31 °C) • Wind: NE at 19 miles per hour (31 km/h)
- Game attendance: 28,000
- Referee: Trennis Livingston
- TV announcers (ESPNU): Doug Sherman (play-by-play), Tyoka Jackson (analyst)

Game information

First quarter

- (6:19) TXST – Jordan McCloud 17 yard run, Mason Shipley kick (Drive: 4 plays, 44 yards, 1:51; Texas State 7–0)
- (1:43) UTSA – Chase Allen 26 yard field goal (Drive: 13 plays, 66 yards, 4:36; Texas State 7–3)
- (0:29) TXST – Jordan McCloud 2 yard run, Mason Shipley kick (Drive: 6 plays, 75 yards, 1:14; Texas State 14–3)

Second quarter

- (12:43) TXST – Chris Dawn Jr. 46 yard pass from Jordan McCloud, Mason Shipley kick (Drive: 6 plays, 61 yards, 2:05; Texas State 21–3)
- (4:39) TXST – Deion Hankins 2 yard run, Mason Shipley kick (Drive: 5 plays, 60 yards, 2:05; Texas State 28–3)
- (1:52) TXST – Lincoln Pare 45 yard run, Mason Shipley kick (Drive: 4 plays, 54 yards, 1:49; Texas State 35–3)

Third quarter

- (7:13) TXST – Chris Dawn Jr. 21 yard pass from Jordan McCloud, Mason Shipley kick (Drive: 6 plays, 52 yards, 2:55; Texas State 42–3)
- (0:02) UTSA – Willie McCoy 2 yard pass from Eddie Lee Marburger, Chase Allen kick (Drive: 19 plays, 75 yards, 7:11; Texas State 42–10)

Fourth quarter

- (9:43) TXST – Lincoln Pare 33 yard run, Mason Shipley kick (Drive: 9 plays, 76 yards, 5:17; Texas State 49–10)

Statistics	UTSA	TXST
First downs	16	26
Plays–yards	80–334	72–504
Rushes–yards	30–82	42–195
Passing yards	252	309
Passing: Comp–Att–Int	24–50–1	18–27–1
Time of possession	20:47	33:13

Team	Category	Player	Statistics
UTSA	Passing	Eddie Lee Marburger	14/27, 147 yards, 1 TD, 1 INT
UTSA	Rushing	Robert Henry Jr.	9 carries, 20 yards
UTSA	Receiving	Willie McCoy	3 receptions, 59 yards, 1 TD
Texas State	Passing	Jordan McCloud	18/27, 309 yards, 2 TD, 1 INT
Texas State	Rushing	Lincoln Pare	11 carries, 109 yards, 2 TD
Texas State	Receiving	Chris Dawn Jr.	5 receptions, 150 yards, 2 TD

=== at No. 2 Texas ===
UTSA Roadrunners (1–1) at No. 2 Texas Longhorns (2–0) – Game summary

Quarter	1	2	3	4	Total
Roadrunners	0	7	0	0	7
No. 2 Longhorns	14	14	14	14	56

at Darrell K Royal–Texas Memorial Stadium • Austin, Texas

- Date: September 14th
- Game time: 6:00 p.m. CDT
- Game weather: Cloudy • Temperature: 95 °F (35 °C) • Wind: S at 6 miles per hour (9.7 km/h)
- Game attendance: 101,892
- Referee: Wayne Winkler
- TV announcers (ESPN): Mark Jones (play-by-play), Roddy Jones (analyst), Quint Kessenich (sideline reporter)

Game information

First quarter

- (9:27) TEX – Isaiah Bond 7 yard pass from Quinn Ewers, Bert Auburn kick (Drive: 8 plays, 84 yards, 3:52; Texas 7–0)
- (0:06) TEX – Johntay Cook II 19 yard pass from Quinn Ewers, Bert Auburn kick (Drive: 12 plays, 69 yards, 6:07; Texas 14–0)

Second quarter

- (12:10) TEX – DeAndre Moore Jr. 19 yard pass from Arch Manning, Bert Auburn kick (Drive: 4 plays, 72 yards, 1:20; Texas 21–0)
- (11:39) UTSA – Robert Henry Jr. 53 yard run, Chase Allen kick (Drive: 2 plays, 75 yards, 0:31; Texas 21–7)
- (11:07) TEX – Arch Manning 67 yard run, Bert Auburn kick (Drive: 2 plays, 75 yards, 0:32; Texas 28–7)

Third quarter

- (13:13) TEX – Isaiah Bond 51 yard pass from Arch Manning, Bert Auburn kick (Drive: 5 plays, 75 yards, 1:47; Texas 35–7)
- (10:57) TEX – Ryan Wingo 75 yard pass from Arch Manning, Bert Auburn kick (Drive: 1 play, 75 yards, 0:11; Texas 42–7)

Fourth quarter

- (13:19) TEX – Johntay Cook II 12 yard pass from Arch Manning, Bert Auburn kick (Drive: 5 plays, 66 yards, 2:01; Texas 49–7)
- (1:50) TEX – Ethan Burke 30 yard interception return, Bert Auburn kick (Texas 56–7)

Statistics	UTSA	TEX
First downs	14	24
Plays–yards	69–260	67–614
Rushes–yards	39–128	35–187
Passing yards	132	427
Passing: Comp–Att–Int	21–30–1	25–32–1
Time of possession	31:01	28:59

Team	Category	Player	Statistics
UTSA	Passing	Owen McCown	21/29, 132 yards
UTSA	Rushing	Robert Henry Jr.	6 carries, 65 yards, 1 TD
UTSA	Receiving	Devin McCuin	5 receptions, 27 yards
Texas	Passing	Arch Manning	9/12, 223 yards, 4 TD
Texas	Rushing	Jerrick Gibson	13 carries, 75 yards
Texas	Receiving	Ryan Wingo	3 receptions, 127 yards, 1 TD

=== Houston Christian (FCS) ===
Houston Christian Huskies (FCS) (1–2) at UTSA Roadrunners (1–2) – Game summary

Quarter	1	2	3	4	Total
Huskies (FCS)	0	7	0	0	7
Roadrunners	10	21	7	7	45

at Alamodome • San Antonio, Texas

- Date: September 21st
- Game time: 2:30 p.m. CDT
- Game weather: None (played indoors)
- Game attendance: 20,973
- Referee: Darryl DeBerry
- TV announcers (ESPN+): Ted Emrich (play-by-play) and Charlie Strong (analyst)

Game information

First quarter

- (9:37) UTSA – Chase Allen 26-yard field goal (Drive: 8 plays, 61 yards, 2:42; UTSA 3–0)
- (2:21) UTSA – Devin McCuin 5-yard pass from Owen McCown, Chase Allen kick (Drive: 10 plays, 54 yards, 4:09; UTSA 10–0)

Second quarter

- (6:14) UTSA – Brandon High 9-yard run, Chase Allen kick (Drive: 7 plays, 50 yards, 2:33; UTSA 17–0)
- (3:58) HCU – Jesse Valenzuela 20-yard run, Reed Chandley kick (Drive: 5 plays, 62 yards, 2:08; UTSA 17–7)
- (2:13) UTSA – Willie McCoy 59-yard pass from Owen McCown, Chase Allen kick (Drive: 5 plays, 75 yards, 1:45; UTSA 24–7)
- (0:47) UTSA – Robert Henry Jr. 17-yard pass from Owen McCown, Tate Sandell kick (Drive: 5 plays, 55 yards, 0:51; UTSA 31–7)

Third quarter

- (11:08) UTSA – Kevorian Barnes 8-yard run, Chase Allen kick (Drive: 9 plays, 68 yards, 3:44; UTSA 38–7)

Fourth quarter

- (13:57) UTSA – Jamel Hardy 5-yard pass from Eddie Lee Marburger, Tate Sandell kick (Drive: 14 plays, 76 yards, 5:49; UTSA 45–7)

Statistics	HCU	UTSA
First downs	12	34
Plays–yards	57–177	83–536
Rushes–yards	32–50	51–269
Passing yards	127	267
Passing: Comp–Att–Int	13–25–0	23–32–1
Time of possession	24:29	35:31

Team	Category	Player	Statistics
Houston Christian	Passing	Eli Brickhandler	7/12, 83 yards
Houston Christian	Rushing	Jesse Valenzuela	5 carries, 22 yards, TD
Houston Christian	Receiving	AJ Wilson	4 receptions, 71 yards
UTSA	Passing	Owen McCown	18/25, 226 yards, 3 TD
UTSA	Rushing	Bryson Donnell	12 carries, 74 yards
UTSA	Receiving	Willie McCoy	2 receptions, 85 yards, TD

=== at East Carolina ===
UTSA Roadrunners (2–2) at East Carolina Pirates (2–2) – Game summary

Quarter	1	2	3	4	Total
Roadrunners	10	3	0	7	20
Pirates	3	7	14	6	30

at Dowdy–Ficklen Stadium • Greenville, North Carolina

- Date: September 28th
- Game time: 3:00 p.m. CDT
- Game weather: Sunny • Temperature: 85 °F (29 °C) • Wind: SW at 9 miles per hour (14 km/h)
- Game attendance: 41,851
- Referee: Tim Rich
- TV announcers (ESPN+): Richard Cross (play-by-play) and Reggie Walker (analyst)

Game information

First quarter

- (11:05) ECU – Noah Perez 21-yard field goal (Drive: 5 plays, 44 yards, 1:47; East Carolina 3–0)
- (9:55) UTSA – Chase Allen 23-yard field goal (Drive: 6 plays, 70 yards, 1:10; Tied 3–3)
- (3:43) UTSA – Oscar Cardenas 5-yard pass from Owen McCown, Chase Allen kick (Drive: 10 plays, 80 yards, 4:37; UTSA 10–3)

Second quarter

- (3:05) UTSA – Chase Allen 35-yard field goal (Drive: 14 plays, 75 yards, 7:16; East Carolina 13–3)
- (0:36) ECU – Jake Garcia 3-yard run, Noah Perez kick (Drive: 8 plays, 75 yards, 2:29; UTSA 13–10)

Third quarter

- (10:45) ECU – Winston Wright Jr. 40-yard pass from Jake Garcia, Noah Perez kick (Drive: 7 plays, 64 yards, 2:01; East Carolina 17–13)
- (0:49) ECU – Anthony Smith 53-yard pass from Jake Garcia, Noah Perez kick (Drive: 7 plays, 85 yards, 2:18; East Carolina 24–13)

Fourth quarter

- (11:51) ECU – Noah Perez 42-yard field goal (Drive: 4 plays, 5 yards, 0:44; East Carolina 27–13)
- (10:38) UTSA – Brandon High 66-yard run, Chase Allen kick (Drive: 4 plays, 75 yards, 1:13; East Carolina 27–20)
- (0:13) ECU – Noah Perez 24-yard field goal (Drive: 4 plays, -2 yards, 1:35; East Carolina 30–20)

Statistics	UTSA	ECU
First downs	18	18
Plays–yards	89–456	71–341
Rushes–yards	38–170	36–47
Passing yards	286	294
Passing: Comp–Att–Int	25–51–2	17–35–2
Time of possession	32:20	27:40

Team	Category	Player	Statistics
UTSA	Passing	Owen McCown	24/49, 251 yards, TD, 2 INT
UTSA	Rushing	Brandon High	7 carries, 92 yards, TD
UTSA	Receiving	Willie McCoy	4 receptions, 91 yards
East Carolina	Passing	Jake Garcia	17/35, 294 yards, 2 TD, 2 INT
East Carolina	Rushing	Rahjai Harris	25 carries, 60 yards
East Carolina	Receiving	Chase Sowell	4 receptions, 67 yards

=== at Rice ===
UTSA Roadrunners (2–3) at Rice Owls (1–4) – Game summary

Quarter	1	2	3	4	Total
Roadrunners	0	10	3	14	27
Owls	0	9	14	6	29

at Rice Stadium • Houston, Texas

- Date: October 12th
- Game time: 6:00 p.m. CDT
- Game weather: Sunny • Temperature: 86 °F (30 °C) • Wind: S at 7 miles per hour (11 km/h)
- Game attendance: 18,660
- Referee: Steven Anderson
- TV announcers (ESPN+): James Westling (play-by-play), Leger Douzable (analyst) and Smacker Miles (sideline)

Game information

First quarter

No scoring plays

Second quarter

- (6:30) UTSA – Tate Sandell 45-yard field goal (Drive: 15 plays, 55 yards, 6:19; UTSA 3–0)
- (4:57) RICE – E. J. Warner 5-yard run (Drive: 4 plays, 75 yards, 1:33; Rice 6–3)
- (1:50) UTSA – DJ Allen 20-yard pass from Owen McCown, Tate Sandell kick (Drive: 7 plays, 75 yards, 3:07; UTSA 10–6)
- (0:00) RICE – Enock Gota 46-yard field goal (Drive: 7 plays, 31 yards, 1:49; UTSA 10–9)

Third quarter

- (13:35) RICE – Dean Connors 69-yard pass from E. J. Warner, Dean Connors rush (Drive: 3 plays, 75 yards, 1:25; Rice 17–10)
- (11:26) UTSA – Tate Sandell 52-yard field goal (Drive: 7 plays, 18 yards, 1:59; Rice 17–13)
- (8:01) RICE – Dean Connors 8-yard run (Drive: 6 plays, 75 yards, 3:25; Rice 23–13)

Fourth quarter

- (5:40) UTSA – Devin McCuin 6-yard pass from Owen McCown, Tate Sandell kick (Drive: 10 plays, 80 yards, 2:40; Rice 23–20)
- (2:06) UTSA – Houston Thomas 38-yard pass from Owen McCown, Tate Sandell kick (Drive: 5 plays, 54 yards, 2:02; UTSA 27–23)
- (0:04) RICE – Matt Sykes 18-yard pass from E. J. Warner (Drive: 8 plays, 65 yards, 1:57; Rice 29–27)

Statistics	UTSA	RICE
First downs	22	21
Plays–yards	78–394	60–389
Rushes–yards	35–138	21–42
Passing yards	256	347
Passing: Comp–Att–Int	28–43–0	25–39–0
Time of possession	30:33	29:27

Team	Category	Player	Statistics
UTSA	Passing	Owen McCown	28/43, 256 yards, 3 TD
UTSA	Rushing	Owen McCown	9 carries, 53 yards
UTSA	Receiving	Devin McCuin	7 receptions, 83 yards, TD
Rice	Passing	E. J. Warner	25/39, 347 yards, 2 TD
Rice	Rushing	Dean Connors	8 carries, 27 yards, TD
Rice	Receiving	Dean Connors	5 receptions, 109 yards, TD

=== Florida Atlantic ===
Florida Atlantic Owls (2–4) at UTSA Roadrunners (2–4) – Game summary

Quarter	1	2	3	4	Total
Owls	7	10	7	0	24
Roadrunners	3	0	7	14	24

at Alamodome • San Antonio, Texas

- Date: October 19th
- Game time: 2:30 p.m. CDT
- Game weather: None (played indoors)
- Game attendance: 20,802
- Referee: Darryl DeBerry
- TV announcers (ESPN+): Ted Emrich (play-by-play) and LaDarrin McLane (analyst)

Game information

First quarter

- (6:25) UTSA – Tate Sandell 33-yard field goal (Drive: 16 plays, 67 yards, 6:50; UTSA 3–0)
- (1:34) FAU – Cam Fancher 76-yard run, Morgan Suarez kick (Drive: 3 plays, 80 yards, 1:02; Florida Atlantic 7–3)

Second quarter

- (14:51) UTSA – Patrick Overmyer 42-yard pass from Owen McCown, Tate Sandell kick (Drive: 5 plays, 75 yards, 1:43; UTSA 10–7)
- (9:39) FAU – Cam Fancher 6-yard run, Morgan Suarez kick (Drive: 3 plays, 3 yards, 1:35; Florida Atlantic 14–10)
- (7:12) FAU – Carter Davis 50-yard field goal (Drive: 5 plays, 27 yards, 1:45; Florida Atlantic 17–10)
- (0:46) UTSA – Jamel Hardy 10-yard pass from Owen McCown, Tate Sandell kick (Drive: 11 plays, 88 yards, 2:35; Tied 17–17)

Third quarter

- (11:19) UTSA – Robert Henry Jr. 1-yard run, Tate Sandell kick (Drive: 9 plays, 75 yards, 3:41; UTSA 24–17)
- (3:58) FAU – Wendol Philord 49-yard fumble recovery, Morgan Suarez kick (Tied 24–24)

Fourth quarter

- (11:21) UTSA – Tate Sandell 41-yard field goal (Drive: 8 plays, 38 yards, 3:25; UTSA 27–24)
- (8:00) UTSA – Tate Sandell 27-yard field goal (Drive: 7 plays, 14 yards, 2:30; UTSA 30–24)
- (2:25) UTSA – Brandon High 29-yard run, Robert Henry Jr. rush (Drive: 8 plays, 62 yards, 4:02; UTSA 38–24)

Statistics	FAU	UTSA
First downs	10	26
Plays–yards	54–203	89–485
Rushes–yards	33–100	44–145
Passing yards	103	340
Passing: Comp–Att–Int	10–21–1	26–45–2
Time of possession	24:18	35:42

Team	Category	Player	Statistics
Florida Atlantic	Passing	Cam Fancher	9/19, 96 yards
Florida Atlantic	Rushing	Cam Fancher	15 carries, 56 yards, 2 TD
Florida Atlantic	Receiving	Caleb Coombs	4 receptions, 61 yards
UTSA	Passing	Owen McCown	26/45, 340 yards, 2 TD, 2 INT
UTSA	Rushing	Brandon High	9 carries, 65 yards, TD
UTSA	Receiving	Houston Thomas	3 receptions, 63 yards

=== at Tulsa ===
UTSA Roadrunners (3–4) at Tulsa Golden Hurricane (2–5) – Game summary

Quarter	1	2	3	4	Total
Roadrunners	14	21	7	3	45
Golden Hurricane	0	7	17	22	46

at H. A. Chapman Stadium • Tulsa, Oklahoma

- Date: October 26th
- Game time: 2:30 p.m. CDT
- Game weather: Sunny
- Game attendance: 17,439
- Referee: Tim Rich
- TV announcers (ESPN+): James Westling (play-by-play) and Leger Douzable (analyst)

Game information

First quarter

- (9:35) UTSA – Oscar Cardenas 9-yard pass from Owen McCown, Tate Sandell kick (Drive: 9 plays, 46 yards, 3:28; UTSA 7–0)
- (1:57) UTSA – Chris Carpenter 69-yard pass from Owen McCown, Tate Sandell kick (Drive: 2 plays, 72 yards, 0:24; UTSA 14–0)

Second quarter

- (13:54) UTSA – Dan Dishman 23-yard pass from Owen McCown (Drive: 2 plays, 31 yards, 0:27; UTSA 20–0)
- (11:58) TLSA – Bill Jackson 31-yard pass from Cooper Legas, Seth Morgan kick (Drive: 6 plays, 75 yards, 1:56; UTSA 20–7)
- (9:00) UTSA – Robert Henry Jr. 9-yard run, Tate Sandell kick (Drive: 7 plays, 75 yards, 2:58; UTSA 27–7)
- (1:01) UTSA – Daemian Wimberly 28-yard fumble recovery, Patrick Overmyer pass (UTSA 35–7)

Third quarter

- (11:52) TLSA – Amieh Williams 35-yard fumble recovery, Seth Morgan kick (UTSA 35–14)
- (7:59) TLSA – Seth Morgan 37-yard field goal (Drive: 5 plays, 36 yards, 1:14; UTSA 35–17)
- (5:30) UTSA – Willie McCoy 5-yard pass from Owen McCown, Tate Sandell kick (Drive: 7 plays, 75 yards, 2:29; UTSA 42–17)
- (4:50) TLSA – Kamdyn Benjamin 74-yard pass from Cooper Legas, Seth Morgan kick (Drive: 2 plays, 75 yards, 0:40; UTSA 42–24)

Fourth quarter

- (14:21) TLSA – Viron Ellison Jr. 4-yard pass from Cooper Legas, Cooper Legas rush (Drive: 8 plays, 67 yards, 2:49; UTSA 42–32)
- (5:21) UTSA – Tate Sandell 37-yard field goal (Drive: 14 plays, 61 yards, 6:01; UTSA 45–32)
- (2:26) TLSA – Kamdyn Benjamin 20-yard pass from Cooper Legas, Seth Morgan kick (Drive: 10 plays, 75 yards, 2:55; UTSA 45–39)
- (1:01) TLSA – Kamdyn Benjamin 4-yard pass from Cooper Legas, Seth Morgan kick (Drive: 8 plays, 92 yards, 1:01; Tulsa 46–45)

Statistics	UTSA	TLSA
First downs	26	21
Plays–yards	91–546	80–433
Rushes–yards	40–103	36–63
Passing yards	443	370
Passing: Comp–Att–Int	31–51–0	24–44–0
Time of possession	33:50	26:10

Team	Category	Player	Statistics
UTSA	Passing	Owen McCown	30/50, 434 yards, 4 TD
UTSA	Rushing	Robert Henry Jr.	20 carries, 67 yards, TD
UTSA	Receiving	Houston Thomas	6 receptions, 132 yards
Tulsa	Passing	Cooper Legas	16/31, 333 yards, 5 TD
Tulsa	Rushing	Cooper Legas	13 carries, 46 yards
Tulsa	Receiving	Kamdyn Benjamin	7 receptions, 125 yards, 3 TD

=== Memphis ===
Memphis Tigers (7–1) at UTSA Roadrunners (3–5) – Game summary

Quarter	1	2	3	4	Total
Tigers	10	14	0	12	36
Roadrunners	14	10	10	10	44

at Alamodome • San Antonio, Texas

- Date: November 2nd
- Game time: 11:00 a.m. CDT
- Game weather: None (played indoors)
- Game attendance: 17,198
- Referee: Kevin Randall
- TV announcers (ESPN2): Roy Philpott (play-by-play), Sam Acho (analyst), and Taylor Davis (sideline reporter)

Game information

First quarter

- (11:37) MEM – Mario Anderson Jr. 16-yard run, Caden Costa kick (Drive: 6 plays, 75 yards, 3:23; Memphis 7–0)
- (8:41) UTSA – Houston Thomas 9-yard pass from Owen McCown, Tate Sandell kick (Drive: 7 plays, 75 yards, 2:56; Tied 7–7)
- (2:50) MEM – Caden Costa 22-yard field goal (Drive: 12 plays, 71 yards, 5:51; Memphis 10–7)
- (0:55) UTSA – Dan Dishman 5-yard pass from Owen McCown, Tate Sandell kick (Drive: 5 plays, 75 yards, 1:55; UTSA 14–10)

Second quarter

- (11:15) MEM – DeMeer Blankumsee 21-yard pass from Seth Henigan, Caden Costa kick (Drive: 10 plays, 75 yards, 4:40; Memphis 17–14)
- (8:42) MEM – DeMeer Blankumsee 69-yard pass from Seth Henigan, Caden Costa kick (Drive: 2 plays, 83 yards, 0:49; Memphis 24–14)
- (5:57) UTSA – Tate Sandell 54-yard field goal (Drive: 7 plays, 39 yards, 2:45; Memphis 24–17)
- (1:27) UTSA – Patrick Overmyer 4-yard pass from Owen McCown, Tate Sandell kick (Drive: 5 plays, 47 yards, 2:23; Tied 24–24)

Third quarter

- (10:02) UTSA – Houston Thomas 8-yard pass from Owen McCown, Tate Sandell kick (Drive: 5 plays, 44 yards, 2:02; UTSA 31–24)
- (5:06) UTSA – Tate Sandell 32-yard field goal (Drive: 9 plays, 33 yards, 3:37; UTSA 34–24)

Fourth quarter

- (6:53) UTSA – Brandon High 2-yard run, Tate Sandell kick (Drive: 5 plays, 36 yards, 2:41; UTSA 41–24)
- (2:43) UTSA – Tate Sandell 42-yard field goal (Drive: 8 plays, 10 yards, 2:38; UTSA 44–24)
- (1:47) MEM – Koby Drake 24-yard pass from Seth Henigan (Drive: 5 plays, 75 yards, 0:56; UTSA 44–30)
- (0:48) MEM – Mario Anderson Jr. 5-yard pass from Seth Henigan (Drive: 6 plays, 50 yards, 0:59; UTSA 44–36)

Statistics	MEM	UTSA
First downs	27	19
Plays–yards	73–516	73–408
Rushes–yards	21–62	35–101
Passing yards	454	307
Passing: Comp–Att–Int	35–52–1	21–38–0
Time of possession	28:47	31:13

Team	Category	Player	Statistics
Memphis	Passing	Seth Henigan	35/52, 454 yards, 4 TD, INT
Memphis	Rushing	Mario Anderson Jr.	12 carries, 53 yards, TD
Memphis	Receiving	DeMeer Blankumsee	6 receptions, 142 yards, 2 TD
UTSA	Passing	Owen McCown	20/37, 280 yards, 4 TD
UTSA	Rushing	Owen McCown	5 carries, 28 yards
UTSA	Receiving	Chris Carpenter	4 receptions, 108 yards

=== North Texas ===
North Texas Mean Green (5–4) at UTSA Roadrunners (4–5) – Game summary

Quarter	1	2	3	4	Total
Mean Green	0	7	13	7	27
Roadrunners	14	13	3	18	48

at Alamodome • San Antonio, Texas

- Date: November 15th
- Game time: 7:00 p.m. CST
- Game weather: None (played indoors)
- Game attendance: 21,350
- Referee: Kevin Randall
- TV announcers (ESPN2): Anish Shroff (play-by-play), Andre Ware (analyst) and Paul Carcaterra (sideline)

Game information

First quarter

- (6:38) UTSA – Kevorian Barnes 1-yard run, Tate Sandell kick (Drive: 8 plays, 49 yards, 3:05; UTSA 7–0)
- (3:41) UTSA – David Amador II 51-yard pass from Owen McCown, Tate Sandell kick (Drive: 2 plays, 59 yards, 0:41; UTSA 14–0)

Second quarter

- (14:42) UNT – Shane Porter 79-yard run, Kali Nguma kick (Drive: 1 play, 79 yards, 0:13; UTSA 14–7)
- (8:43) UTSA – Dan Dishman 7-yard pass from Owen McCown, Tate Sandell kick (Drive: 14 plays, 75 yards, 5:59; UTSA 21–7)
- (4:20) UTSA – Tate Sandell 42-yard field goal (Drive: 6 plays, 51 yards, 2:25; UTSA 24–7)
- (0:00) UTSA – Tate Sandell 44-yard field goal (Drive: 11 plays, 58 yards, 1:26; UTSA 27–7)

Third quarter

- (7:29) UNT – Shane Porter 39-yard run, Kali Nguma kick (Drive: 10 plays, 86 yards, 3:14; UTSA 27–14)
- (1:55) UTSA – Tate Sandell 28-yard field goal (Drive: 12 plays, 70 yards, 5:34; UTSA 30–14)
- (1:28) UNT – Shane Porter 43-yard run (Drive: 2 plays, 75 yards, 0:27; UTSA 30–20)

Fourth quarter

- (14:04) UTSA – Tate Sandell 34-yard field goal (Drive: 6 plays, 58 yards, 2:24; UTSA 33–20)
- (12:27) UNT – Blair Conwright 14-yard pass from Chandler Morris, Kali Nguma kick (Drive: 4 plays, 75 yards, 1:37; UTSA 33–27)
- (9:15) UTSA – Robert Henry Jr. 2-yard run, Patrick Overmyer pass (Drive: 6 plays, 82 yards, 2:42; UTSA 41–27)
- (2:33) UTSA – Robert Henry Jr. 83-yard run, Tate Sandell kick (Drive: 1 play, 83 yards, 0:12; UTSA 48–27)

Statistics	UNT	UTSA
First downs	20	30
Plays–yards	61–480	91–681
Rushes–yards	25–239	48–302
Passing yards	241	379
Passing: Comp–Att–Int	21–36–2	29–43–1
Time of possession	20:44	39:16

Team	Category	Player	Statistics
North Texas	Passing	Chandler Morris	21/36, 241 yards, TD, 2 INT
North Texas	Rushing	Shane Porter	13 carries, 193 yards, 3 TD
North Texas	Receiving	Damon Ward Jr.	4 receptions, 85 yards
UTSA	Passing	Owen McCown	29/43, 379 yards, 2 TD, INT
UTSA	Rushing	Robert Henry Jr.	20 carries, 168 yards, 2 TD
UTSA	Receiving	David Amador II	9 receptions, 122 yards, TD

=== Temple ===
Temple Owls (3–7) at UTSA Roadrunners (5–5) – Game summary

Quarter	1	2	3	4	Total
Owls	3	14	7	3	27
Roadrunners	7	21	10	13	51

at Alamodome • San Antonio, Texas

- Date: November 22nd
- Game time: 6:00 p.m. CST
- Game weather: None (played indoors); 74 °F (23 °C)
- Game attendance: 20,121
- Referee: Edwin Lee
- TV announcers (ESPN2): Anish Shroff (play-by-play), Andre Ware (analyst) and Paul Carcaterra (sideline)

Game information

First quarter

- (10:47) UTSA – Robert Henry Jr. 40-yard run, Tate Sandell kick (Drive: 5 plays, 67 yards, 2:04; UTSA 7–0)
- (6:08) TEM – Maddux Trujillo 37-yard field goal (Drive: 6 plays, 22 yards, 1:04; UTSA 7–3)

Second quarter

- (10:54) UTSA – Owen McCown 75-yard run, Tate Sandell kick (Drive: 1 play, 75 yards, 0:14; UTSA 14–3)
- (4:37) TEM – Dante Wright 9-yard pass from Evan Simon, Maddux Trujillo kick (Drive: 6 plays, 30 yards, 2:24; UTSA 14–10)
- (4:24) UTSA – Chris Carpenter 97-yard kickoff return, Tate Sandell kick (UTSA 21–10)
- (1:57) UTSA – Robert Henry Jr. 8-yard run, Tate Sandell kick (Drive: 3 plays, 97 yards, 1:04; UTSA 28–10)
- (0:27) TEM – Antwain Littleton II 4-yard run, Maddux Trujillo kick (Drive: 7 plays, 75 yards, 1:23; UTSA 28–17)

Third quarter

- (11:58) UTSA – Chase Allen 23-yard field goal (Drive: 7 plays, 44 yards, 3:01; UTSA 31–17)
- (7:27) TEM – Dante Wright 61-yard pass from Evan Simon, Maddux Trujillo kick (Drive: 1 play, 61 yards, 0:10; UTSA 31–24)
- (4:59) UTSA – Willie McCoy 3-yard pass from Owen McCown, Tate Sandell kick (Drive: 2 plays, 43 yards, 0:26; UTSA 38–24)

Fourth quarter

- (14:56) TEM – Maddux Trujillo 33-yard field goal (Drive: 6 plays, 10 yards, 1:42; UTSA 38–27)
- (8:19) UTSA – Tate Sandell 47-yard field goal (Drive: 6 plays, 27 yards, 3:20; UTSA 41–27)
- (5:24) UTSA – Tate Sandell 42-yard field goal (Drive: 4 plays, 2 yards, 1:49; UTSA 44–27)
- (2:29) UTSA – Brandon High 3-yard run, Tate Sandell kick (Drive: 5 plays, 27 yards, 2:32; UTSA 51–27)

Statistics	TEM	UTSA
First downs	13	19
Plays–yards	69–289	66–529
Rushes–yards	37–70	39–309
Passing yards	219	220
Passing: Comp–Att–Int	13–32–2	20–27–2
Time of possession	29:45	30:15

Team	Category	Player	Statistics
Temple	Passing	Evan Simon	13/32, 219 yards, 2 TD, 2 INT
Temple	Rushing	Antwain Littleton	18 carries, 64 yards, TD
Temple	Receiving	Dante Wright	5 receptions, 128 yards, 2 TD
UTSA	Passing	Owen McCown	20/27, 220 yards, TD, 2 INT
UTSA	Rushing	Robert Henry Jr.	16 carries, 178 yards, 2 TD
UTSA	Receiving	David Amador II	7 receptions, 63 yards

=== at Army ===
UTSA Roadrunners (6–5) at Army Black Knights (9–1) – Game summary

Quarter	1	2	3	4	Total
Roadrunners	7	3	7	7	24
Black Knights	7	6	3	13	29

at Michie Stadium • West Point, New York

- Date: November 30th
- Game time: 11:00 a.m. CST
- Game weather: Temperature: 36 °F (2 °C) • Wind: West at 10 miles per hour (16 km/h) • Weather: Clear
- Game attendance: 22,120
- Referee: Charles Lamertina
- TV announcers (CBSSN): Dave Ryan (play-by-play), Adam Breneman (analyst), and Tina Cervasio (sideline reporter)

Game information

First quarter

- (7:23) ARMY – Tyrell Robinson 41-yard pass from Bryson Daily, Trey Gronotte kick (Drive: 13 plays, 75 yards, 7:37; Army 7–0)
- (4:45) UTSA – Brandon High Jr. 10-yard run, Tate Sandell kick (Drive: 7 plays, 53 yards, 2:32; Tied 7–7)

Second quarter

- (5:17) ARMY – Trey Gronotte 39-yard field goal (Drive: 8 plays, 44 yards, 3:05; Army 10–7)
- (1:39) UTSA – Tate Sandell 33-yard field goal (Drive: 12 plays, 58 yards, 3:30; Tied 10–10)
- (0:00) ARMY – Trey Gronotte 35-yard field goal (Drive: 5 plays, 29 yards, 0:15; Army 13–10)

Third quarter

- (10:13) UTSA – Devin McCuin 23-yard pass from Owen McCown, Tate Sandell kick (Drive: 11 plays, 75 yards, 4:47; UTSA 17–13)
- (1:34) ARMY – Trey Gronotte 22-yard field goal (Drive: 14 plays, 70 yards, 8:39; UTSA 17–16)

Fourth quarter

- (12:19) ARMY – Bryson Daily 1-yard run, 2-point conversion failed (Drive: 5 plays, 16 yards, 2:37; Army 22–17)
- (10:26) ARMY – Bryson Daily 42-yard run, Trey Gronotte kick (Drive: 2 plays, 46 yards, 0:51; Army 29–17)
- (9:10) UTSA – Brandon High Jr. 6-yard run, Tate Sandell kick (Drive: 4 plays, 75 yards, 1:16; Army 29–24)

Statistics	UTSA	ARMY
First downs	16	22
Plays–yards	54–324	77–407
Rushes–yards	26–117	60–217
Passing yards	207	190
Passing: Comp–Att–Int	17–28–2	10–17–0
Time of possession	19:34	40:26

Team	Category	Player	Statistics
UTSA	Passing	Owen McCown	17/28, 207 yards, TD, 2 INT
UTSA	Rushing	Brandon High Jr.	16 carries, 61 yards, 2 TD
UTSA	Receiving	Devin McCuin	3 receptions, 82 yards, TD
Army	Passing	Bryson Daily	10/17, 190 yards, TD
Army	Rushing	Bryson Daily	27 carries, 147 yards, 2 TD
Army	Receiving	Casey Reynolds	4 receptions, 81 yards

=== Coastal Carolina (Myrtle Beach Bowl) ===
2024 Myrtle Beach Bowl
UTSA Roadrunners (6-6, 4-4) at Coastal Carolina Chanticleers (6-6, 3-5)

Quarter	1	2	3	4	Total
Roadrunners	0	21	6	17	44
Chanticleers	0	0	0	15	15

at Brooks Stadium, Conway, South Carolina

- Date: December 23rd, 2024
- Game time: 10:00 a.m. CST/8:00 a.m. PST
- Game weather: Sunny • Temperature: 41 °F (5 °C) • Wind: 8 mph (13 km/h) south
- Game attendance: 8,164
- Referee: Rodney Burnette
- TV announcers (ESPN): Taylor Zarzour (play-by-play), Matt Stinchcomb (analyst), and Alyssa Lang (sideline)

Game information

First Quarter
Second Quarter
Third Quarter
Fourth Quarter

Win Probability

Line

Over/Under

Statistics	UTSA	CCU
First downs	23	16
Plays–yards	64–513	69–273
Rushes–yards	31–257	41–98
Passing yards	256	173
Passing: Comp–Att–Int	24–33–1	17–28–1
Time of possession	26:23	33:37

Team	Category	Player	Statistics
UTSA	Passing	Owen McCown	23/30 253 yards 1TD 1 INT
UTSA	Rushing	Will Henderson III	5 attempts 81 yards 1TD
UTSA	Receiving	David Amador II	7 catches 110 yards
Coastal Carolina	Passing	Tad Hudson	17/25 173 Yards 2TD
Coastal Carolina	Rushing	Braydon Bennett	22 attempts 53 yards
Coastal Carolina	Receiving	Bryson Graves	2 Catches 53 yards
