= 2024 Temple Owls football team =

American college football season

2024 Temple Owls football
- Conference: American Athletic Conference
- Record: 3–9 (2–6 AAC)
- Head coach: Stan Drayton (3rd season; first 10 games); Everett Withers (interim; final 2 games)
- Offensive coordinator: Danny Langsdorf (3rd season)
- Offensive scheme: Pro-style
- Defensive coordinator: Everett Withers (2nd season)
- Base defense: Multiple
- Home stadium: Lincoln Financial Field

2024 American Athletic Conference football standings
	Conf.			Overall
Team	W		L	W		L
No. 21 Army y$	8	–	0	12	–	2
Tulane y	7	–	1	9	–	5
Navy	6	–	2	10	–	3
No. 24 Memphis	6	–	2	11	–	2
East Carolina	5	–	3	8	–	5
South Florida	4	–	4	7	–	6
UTSA	4	–	4	7	–	6
Charlotte	4	–	4	5	–	7
North Texas	3	–	5	6	–	7
Rice	3	–	5	4	–	8
Temple	2	–	6	3	–	9
UAB	2	–	6	3	–	9
Florida Atlantic	1	–	7	3	–	9
Tulsa	1	–	7	3	–	9
Championship: Army 35, Tulane 14
$ – Conference champion; y – Championship game participant; Rankings from AP Poll

The 2024 Temple Owls football team represented Temple University in the American Athletic Conference (AAC) during the 2024 NCAA Division I FBS football season. The Owls played their home games at Lincoln Financial Field, located in Philadelphia, Pennsylvania.

The Owls were led by Stan Drayton in his third year as the head coach, until he was fired on November 17, 2024. Temple was 3–7 to start the season and 9–25 during Drayton's tenure. Defensive coordinator and outside linebackers coach Everett Withers was then named interim head coach.

== Preseason ==
=== AAC media poll ===
The American Athletic Conference released its media prediction poll on July 23, 2024. The Owls were predicted to finish last in the conference.

Media poll
Predicted finish	Team	Votes (1st place)
1	Memphis	409 (23)
2	UTSA	368 (4)
3	Tulane	362 (2)
4	South Florida	339
5	Army	236 (1)
6	Florida Atlantic	228
7	East Carolina	219
7	Rice	219
9	North Texas	216
10	UAB	192
11	Navy	150
12	Tulsa	95
13	Charlotte	77
14	Temple	40

== Schedule ==
Date	Time	Opponent	Site	TV	Result	Attendance
August 30	7:00 p.m.	at No. 16 Oklahoma*	Gaylord Family Oklahoma Memorial Stadium; Norman, OK	ESPN	L 3–51	83,329
September 7	3:30 p.m.	at Navy	Navy–Marine Corps Memorial Stadium; Annapolis, MD	CBSSN	L 11–38	28,889
September 14	2:00 p.m.	Coastal Carolina*	Lincoln Financial Field; Philadelphia, PA	ESPN+	L 20–28	13,945
September 21	2:00 p.m.	Utah State*	Lincoln Financial Field; Philadelphia, PA	ESPN+	W 45–29	11,384
September 26	7:30 p.m.	Army	Lincoln Financial Field; Philadelphia, PA	ESPN	L 14–42	13,255
October 5	3:30 p.m.	at UConn*	Rentschler Field; East Hartford, CT	CBSSN	L 20–29	28,921
October 19	2:00 p.m.	Tulsa^{†}	Lincoln Financial Field; Philadelphia, PA	ESPN+	W 20–10	18,721
October 26	2:00 p.m.	at East Carolina	Dowdy–Ficklen Stadium; Greenville, NC	ESPN+	L 34–56	33,744
November 9	4:00 p.m.	at Tulane	Yulman Stadium; New Orleans, LA	ESPNU	L 6–52	30,000
November 16	2:00 p.m.	Florida Atlantic	Lincoln Financial Field; Philadelphia, PA	ESPN+	W 18–15 ^{OT}	12,291
November 22	7:00 p.m.	at UTSA	Alamodome; San Antonio, TX	ESPN2	L 27–51	20,121
November 30	12:00 p.m.	North Texas	Lincoln Financial Field; Philadelphia, PA	ESPN+	L 17–24	11,589
*Non-conference game; ^{†}Homecoming; Rankings from AP Poll - Released prior to game; All times are in Eastern time

== Game summaries ==
=== at No. 16 Oklahoma ===
Temple Owls (0–0) at No. 16 Oklahoma Sooners (0–0) – Game summary

Quarter	1	2	3	4	Total
Owls	0	0	3	0	3
No. 16 Sooners	17	17	3	14	51

at Gaylord Family Oklahoma Memorial Stadium • Norman, Oklahoma

- Date: August 30th
- Game time: 7:00 p.m. EDT
- Game weather: Cloudy • Temperature: 84 °F (29 °C) • Wind: NE at 7 miles per hour (11 km/h)
- Game attendance: 83,329
- Referee: Jeff Heaser
- TV announcers (ESPN): Anish Shroff (play-by-play), Andre Ware (analyst), Paul Carcaterra (sideline reporter)

Game information

First quarter

- (11:17) OU – Bauer Sharp 14 yard pass from Jackson Arnold, Tyler Keltner kick (Drive: 7 plays, 76 yards, 2:46; Oklahoma 7–0)
- (8:07) OU – Deion Burks 14 yard pass from Jackson Arnold, Tyler Keltner kick (Drive: 5 plays, 43 yards, 1:43; Oklahoma 14–0)
- (0:43) OU – Tyler Keltner 50 yard field goal (Drive: 4 plays, 1 yard, 1:22; Oklahoma 17–0)

Second quarter

- (8:05) OU – Tyler Keltner 42 yard field goal (Drive: 12 plays, 34 yards, 4:51; Oklahoma 20–0)
- (5:28) OU – Deion Burks 8 yard pass from Jackson Arnold, Tyler Keltner kick (Drive: 5 plays, 44 yards, 1:22; Oklahoma 27–0)
- (0:36) OU – Deion Burks 5 yard pass from Jackson Arnold, Tyler Keltner kick (Drive: 2 plays, 6 yards, 0:38; Oklahoma 34–0)

Third quarter

- (7:53) OU – Tyler Keltner 24 yard field goal (Drive: 8 plays, 52 yards, 2:26; Oklahoma 37–0)
- (3:07) TEM – Maddux Trujillo 49 yard field goal (Drive: 10 plays, 44 yards, 4:46; Oklahoma 37–3)

Fourth quarter

- (11:44) OU – Jaren Kanak 21 yard fumble return, Tyler Keltner kick (Oklahoma 44–3)
- (3:11) OU – Taylor Tatum 8 yard run, Tyler Keltner kick (Drive: 9 plays, 85 yards, 4:23; Oklahoma 51–3)

Statistics	TEM	OU
First downs	13	18
Plays–yards	61–197	65–378
Rushes–yards	36–69	36–220
Passing yards	128	158
Passing: Comp–Att–Int	12–25–2	19–29–0
Time of possession	31:31	28:29

Team	Category	Player	Statistics
Temple	Passing	Forrest Brock	12/25, 128 yards, 2 INT
Temple	Rushing	E.J. Wilson	6 carries, 31 yards
Temple	Receiving	Dante Wright	3 receptions, 36 yards
Oklahoma	Passing	Jackson Arnold	17/25, 141 yards, 4 TD
Oklahoma	Rushing	Taylor Tatum	5 carries, 69 yards, 1 TD
Oklahoma	Receiving	Bauer Sharp	5 receptions, 47 yards, 1 TD

=== at Navy ===
Temple Owls (0–1) at Navy Midshipmen (1–0) – Game summary

Quarter	1	2	3	4	Total
Owls	0	3	0	8	11
Midshipmen	9	14	15	0	38

at Navy–Marine Corps Memorial Stadium • Annapolis, Maryland

- Date: September 7th
- Game time: 3:30 p.m. EDT
- Game weather: Cloudy • Temperature: 71 °F (22 °C) • Wind: NW at 14 miles per hour (23 km/h)
- Game attendance: 28,889
- Referee: Steven Anderson
- TV announcers (CBSSN): Carter Blackburn (play-by-play), Randy Cross (analyst), Sheehan Stanwick-Burch (sideline reporter)

Game information

First quarter

- (5:44) NAVY – Team safety (Navy 2–0)
- (0:23) NAVY – Blake Horvath 2 yard run, Nathan Kirkwood kick (Drive: 11 plays, 58 yards, 5:15; Navy 9–0)

Second quarter

- (13:11) NAVY – Blake Horvath 62 yard run, Nathan Kirkwood kick (Drive: 1 play, 62 yards, 0:10; Navy 16–0)
- (8:04) NAVY – Alex Tecza 65 yard run, Nathan Kirkwood kick (Drive: 1 play, 65 yards, 0:08; Navy 23–0)
- (0:00) TEM – Maddux Trujillo 36 yard field goal (Drive: 7 plays, 37 yards, 1:28; Navy 23–3)

Third quarter

- (11:01) NAVY – Eli Heidenreich 31 yard pass from Blake Horvath, 2-point pass (Drive: 9 plays, 81 yards, 3:54; Navy 31–3)
- (2:58) NAVY – Blake Horvath 18 yard run, Nathan Kirkwood kick (Drive: 4 plays, 28 yards, 1:50; Navy 38–3)

Fourth quarter

- (10:00) TEM – Dante Wright 23 yard pass from Forrest Brock, 2-point pass (Drive: 11 plays, 82 yards, 4:53; Navy 38–11)

Statistics	TEM	NAVY
First downs	16	17
Plays–yards	66–312	60–409
Rushes–yards	20–35	51–297
Passing yards	277	112
Passing: Comp–Att–Int	30–46–2	5–9–0
Time of possession	29:10	30:50

Team	Category	Player	Statistics
Temple	Passing	Forrest Brock	30/46, 277 yards, 1 TD, 2 INT
Temple	Rushing	Antwain Littleton II	9 carries, 22 yards
Temple	Receiving	Dante Wright	11 receptions, 101 yards, 1 TD
Navy	Passing	Blake Horvath	5/9, 112 yards, 1 TD
Navy	Rushing	Blake Horvath	15 carries, 122 yards, 3 TD
Navy	Receiving	Eli Heidenreich	4 receptions, 98 yards, 1 TD

=== Coastal Carolina ===
Coastal Carolina Chanticleers (2–0) at Temple Owls (0–2) – Game summary

Quarter	1	2	3	4	Total
Chanticleers	14	7	7	0	28
Owls	3	7	7	3	20

at Lincoln Financial Field • Philadelphia, Pennsylvania

- Date: September 14th
- Game time: 2:00 p.m. EDT
- Game weather: Sunny • Temperature: 85 °F (29 °C) • Wind: E at 8 miles per hour (13 km/h)
- Game attendance: 13,945
- Referee: Tim Rich
- TV announcers (ESPN+): Richard Cross (play-by-play), Barrett Brooks (analyst)

Game information

First quarter

- (4:14) CCU – Christian Washington 15 yard run, Kade Hensley kick (Drive: 11 plays, 63 yards, 4:46; Coastal Carolina 7–0)
- (3:30) CCU – Xamarion Gordon 29 yard interception return, Kade Hensley kick (Coastal Carolina 14–0)
- (1:37) TEM – Maddux Trujillo 54 yard field goal (Drive: 5 plays, 39 yards, 1:53; Coastal Carolina 14–3)

Second quarter

- (8:25) CCU – Cameron Wright 8 yard pass from Ethan Vasko, Kade Hensley kick (Drive: 2 plays, 11 yards, 0:43; Coastal Carolina 21–3)
- (4:37) TEM – John Adams 15 yard pass from Evan Simon, Maddux Trujillo kick (Drive: 8 plays, 75 yards, 3:48; Coastal Carolina 21–10)

Third quarter

- (10:26) TEM – Dante Wright 2 yard pass from Evan Simon, Maddux Trujillo kick (Drive: 7 plays, 53 yards, 3:44; Coastal Carolina 21–17)
- (3:48) CCU – Christian Washington 5 yard run, Kade Hensley kick (Drive: 13 plays, 75 yards, 6:38; Coastal Carolina 28–17)

Fourth quarter

- (12:58) TEM – Maddux Trujillo 37 yard field goal (Drive: 11 plays, 54 yards, 5:44; Coastal Carolina 28–20)

Statistics	CCU	TEM
First downs	19	15
Plays–yards	63–287	61–314
Rushes–yards	42–184	36–129
Passing yards	103	185
Passing: Comp–Att–Int	15–21–0	17–25–1
Time of possession	29:41	30:19

Team	Category	Player	Statistics
Coastal Carolina	Passing	Ethan Vasko	15/21, 103 yards, 1 TD
Coastal Carolina	Rushing	Ethan Vasko	16 carries, 92 yards
Coastal Carolina	Receiving	Jameson Tucker	4 receptions, 35 yards
Temple	Passing	Evan Simon	17/25, 185 yards, 2 TD, 1 INT
Temple	Rushing	Antwain Littleton II	14 carries, 74 yards
Temple	Receiving	Dante Wright	9 receptions, 99 yards, 1 TD

=== Utah State ===
Utah State Aggies (1–2) at Temple Owls (0–3) – Game summary

Quarter	1	2	3	4	Total
Aggies	0	21	0	8	29
Owls	0	17	7	21	45

at Lincoln Financial Field • Philadelphia, Pennsylvania

- Date: September 21st
- Game time: 2:00 p.m. EDT
- Game weather: Sunny • Temperature: 78 °F (26 °C) • Wind: NE at 3 miles per hour (4.8 km/h)
- Game attendance: 11,384
- Referee: Edwin Lee
- TV announcers (ESPN+): Shawn Kenney (play-by-play) and Barrett Brooks (analyst)
- Box Score

Game information
First quarter

No scoring plays.

Second quarter

- (14:30) USU – Herschel Turner 4-yard run, Elliott Nimrod kick (Drive: 6 plays, 37 yards, 1:11; Utah State 7–0.)
- (11:19) USU – Jalen Royals 26-yard pass from Spencer Petras, Elliott Nimrod kick (Drive: 5 plays, 48 yards, 2:11; Utah State 14–0.)
- (7:50) TEM – Antonio Jones 32-yard pass from Evan Simon, Maddux Trujillo kick (Drive: 8 plays, 78 yards, 3:24; Utah State 14–7.)
- (1:10) TEM – Antwain Littleton II 17-yard pass from Evan Simon, Maddux Trujillo kick (Drive: 10 plays, 65 yards, 5:17; Tied 14–14.)
- (0:17) USU – Rahsul Faison 20-yard run, Elliott Nimrod kick (Drive: 6 plays, 75 yards, 0:53; Utah State 21–14.)
- (0:00) TEM – Maddux Trujillo 64-yard field goal (Drive: 2 plays, 11 yards, 0:10; Utah State 21–17.)

Third quarter

- (4:10) TEM – Dante Wright 91-yard pass from Evan Simon, Maddux Trujillo kick (Drive: 3 plays, 94 yards, 0:59; Temple 24–21.)

Fourth quarter

- (11:57) TEM – Daniel Evert 16-yard pass from Evan Simon, Maddux Trujillo kick (Drive: 9 plays, 82 yards, 5:01; Temple 31–21.)
- (6:02) TEM – Peter Clarke 2-yard pass from Evan Simon, Maddux Trujillo kick (Drive: 7 plays, 36 yards, 4:10; Temple 38–21.)
- (3:55) USU – Jack Hestera 28-yard pass from Spencer Petras, Kyrese White pass (Drive: 4 plays, 75 yards, 2:07; Temple 35–29.)
- (3:22) TEM – Evan Simon 1-yard run, Maddux Trujillo kick (Drive: 4 plays, 26 yards, 0:26; Temple 45–29.)

Statistics	USU	TEM
First downs	26	20
Plays–yards	80–479	68–451
Rushes–yards	36–186	41–180
Passing yards	293	271
Passing: Comp–Att–Int	26–44–1	17–27–0
Time of possession	29:02	30:58

Team	Category	Player	Statistics
Utah State	Passing	Spencer Petras	26/44, 293 yards, 2 TD, INT
Utah State	Rushing	Rahsul Faison	27 carries, 148 yards, TD
Utah State	Receiving	Jalen Royals	10 receptions, 112 yards, TD
Temple	Passing	Evan Simon	17/27, 271 yards, 5 TD
Temple	Rushing	Evan Simon	11 carries, 49 yards, TD
Temple	Receiving	Dante Wright	3 receptions, 116 yards, TD

=== Army ===
Army Black Knights (3–0) at Temple Owls (1–3) – Game summary

Quarter	1	2	3	4	Total
Black Knights	7	7	14	14	42
Owls	0	0	6	8	14

at Lincoln Financial Field • Philadelphia, Pennsylvania

- Date: September 26th
- Game time: 7:30 p.m. EDT
- Game weather: Cloudy • Temperature: 77 °F (25 °C) • Wind: S at 5 miles per hour (8.0 km/h)
- Game attendance: 13,255
- Referee: Charles Lamertina
- TV announcers (ESPN): Matt Barrie (play-by-play), Dan Mullen (analyst) and Harry Lyles Jr. (sideline reporter)

Game information

First quarter

- (9:48) ARM – Noah Short 61-yard run, Trey Gronotte kick (Drive: 3 plays, 86 yards, 1:32; Army 7–0)

Second quarter

- (11:50) ARM – Bryson Daily 8-yard run, Trey Gronotte kick (Drive: 13 plays, 89 yards, 8:29; Army 14–0)

Third quarter

- (10:50) ARM – Bryson Daily 9-yard run, Trey Gronotte kick (Drive: 7 plays, 75 yards, 4:10; Army 21–0)
- (5:22) ARM – Kanye Udoh 28-yard run, Trey Gronotte kick (Drive: 6 plays, 52 yards, 3:44; Army 28–0)
- (1:10) TEM – Dante Wright 29-yard pass from Evan Simon (Drive: 7 plays, 75 yards, 4:12; Army 28–6)

Fourth quarter

- (11:19) TEM – Daniel Evert 54-yard pass from Evan Simon, Antonio Jones pass (Drive: 6 plays, 65 yards, 2:23; Army 28–14)
- (7:36) ARM – Bryson Daily 12-yard run, Trey Gronotte kick (Drive: 6 plays, 75 yards, 3:43; Army 35–14)
- (1:54) ARM – Cam Schurr 18-yard pass from Dewayne Coleman, Trey Gronotte kick (Drive: 8 plays, 46 yards, 4:25; Army 42–14)

Statistics	ARMY	TEM
First downs	23	12
Plays–yards	63–489	52–219
Rushes–yards	57–417	22–-5
Passing yards	72	224
Passing: Comp–Att–Int	3–6–0	19–30–1
Time of possession	35:14	24:40

Team	Category	Player	Statistics
Army	Passing	Bryson Daily	2/5, 54 yards
Army	Rushing	Bryson Daily	24 carries, 152 yards, 3 TD
Army	Receiving	Noah Short	1 reception, 27 yards
Temple	Passing	Evan Simon	19/30, 224 yards, 2 TD, INT
Temple	Rushing	Joquez Smith	4 carries, 8 yards
Temple	Receiving	Dante Wright	8 receptions, 98 yards, TD

=== at UConn ===
Temple Owls (1–4) at UConn Huskies (3–2) – Game summary

Quarter	1	2	3	4	Total
Owls	0	7	6	7	20
Huskies	3	6	7	13	29

at Rentschler Field • East Hartford, Connecticut

- Date: October 5th
- Game time: 3:30 p.m. EDT
- Game weather: Temperature: 74 °F (23 °C) • Wind: N at 11 miles per hour (18 km/h) • Weather: Sunny
- Game attendance: 28,921
- Referee: Marcus Woods
- TV announcers (CBSSN): Jordan Kent (play-by-play) and Adam Breneman (analyst)

Game information

First quarter

- CONN - Freeman, Chris 43 yd field goal, 6:25. Huskies 3–0. Drive: 4 plays, -2 yards, TOP 01:17

Second quarter

- TEM - Adams, John 0 yd punt return (Trujillo, Maddux kick), 10:32. Owls 7–3. Drive: 1 play, 0 yards
- CONN - Freeman, Chris 24 yd field goal, 1:45. Owls 7–6. Drive: 13 plays, 53 yards, TOP 04:06
- CONN - Freeman, Chris 35 yd field goal, 0:08. Huskies 9–7. Drive: 13 plays, 51 yards, TOP 01:13

Third quarter

- TEM - Trujillo, Maddux 60 yd field goal, 11:08. Owls 10–9. Drive: 10 plays, 39 yards, TOP 03:48
- TEM - Trujillo, Maddux 42 yd field goal, 2:43. Owls 13–9. Drive: 4 plays, -10 yards, TOP 01:58
- CONN - Sheffield, TJ 58 yd pass from Fagnano, Joe (Freeman, Chris kick), 2:11. Huskies 16–13. Drive: 2 plays, 75 yards, TOP 00:32

Fourth quarter

- TEM - Brock, Forrest 8 yd run (Trujillo, Maddux kick), 9:52. Owls 20–16. Drive: 5 plays, 44 yards, TOP 02:04
- CONN - Robinson, Durell 1 yd run (Freeman, Chris kick), 3:46. Huskies 23–20. Drive: 10 plays, 70 yards, TOP 03:31
- CONN - Wright, Jordan 96 yd fumble recovery (No kick attempt), 0:00. Huskies 29–0. Drive: 1 play, 96 yards

Statistics	TEM	CONN
First downs	15	21
Plays–yards	68–270	82–371
Rushes–yards	37–134	41–99
Passing yards	136	272
Passing: Comp–Att–Int	18–31–1	24–41–2
Time of possession	29:10	30:50

Team	Category	Player	Statistics
Temple	Passing	Forrest Brock	19/32, 136 yards
Temple	Rushing	Terrez Worthy	12 carries, 95 yards
Temple	Receiving	Dante Wright	8 receptions, 67 yards
UConn	Passing	Joe Fagnano	24/41, 272 yards, TD
UConn	Rushing	Durell Robinson	12 carries, 52 yards, TD
UConn	Receiving	TJ Sheffield	9 receptions, 141 yards, TD

=== Tulsa ===
Tulsa Golden Hurricane (2–4) at Temple Owls (1–5) – Game summary

Quarter	1	2	3	4	Total
Golden Hurricane	0	0	10	0	10
Owls	3	14	0	3	20

at Lincoln Financial Field • Philadelphia, Pennsylvania

- Date: October 19th
- Game time: 2:00 p.m. EDT
- Game weather: Sunny • Temperature: 71 °F (22 °C) • Wind: NE 3 miles per hour (4.8 km/h)
- Game attendance: 18,721
- Referee: Reid Jackson
- TV announcers (ESPN+): Doug Sherman (play-by-play) and Barrett Brooks (analyst)

Game information

First quarter

- (3:20) TEM – Maddux Trujillo 29-yard field goal (Drive: 7 plays, 87 yards, 2:54; Temple 3–0)

Second quarter

- (12:55) TEM – Peter Clarke 3-yard pass from Evan Simon, Maddux Trujillo kick (Drive: 10 plays, 53 yards, 4:30; Temple 10–0)
- (4:23) TEM – Terrez Worthy 1-yard run, Maddux Trujillo kick (Drive: 11 plays, 92 yards, 5:32; Temple 17–0)

Third quarter

- (8:59) TUL – Anthony Watkins 63-yard pass from Kirk Francis, Seth Morgan kick (Drive: 3 plays, 88 yards, 1:30; Temple 17–7)
- (2:40) TUL – Seth Morgan 46-yard field goal (Drive: 9 plays, 50 yards, 4:35; Temple 17–10)

Fourth quarter

- (12:50) TEM – Maddux Trujillo 41-yard field goal (Drive: 14 plays, 59 yards, 4:30; Temple 20–10)

Statistics	TLSA	TEM
First downs	17	21
Plays–yards	58–240	75–397
Rushes–yards	31–75	28–81
Passing yards	165	316
Passing: Comp–Att–Int	14–27–1	31–47–1
Time of possession	25:32	34:12

Team	Category	Player	Statistics
Tulsa	Passing	Kirk Francis	11/23, 148 yards, TD, INT
Tulsa	Rushing	Anthony Watkins	7 carries, 23 yards
Tulsa	Receiving	Anthony Watkins	3 receptions, 73 yards, TD
Temple	Passing	Evan Simon	3/46, 297 yards, TD, INT
Temple	Rushing	Terrez Worthy	12 carries, 41 yards, TD
Temple	Receiving	Landon Morris	4 receptions, 97 yards

=== at East Carolina ===
Temple Owls (2–5) at East Carolina Pirates (3–4) – Game summary

Quarter	1	2	3	4	Total
Owls	14	7	7	6	34
Pirates	13	14	29	0	56

at Dowdy–Ficklen Stadium • Greenville, North Carolina

- Date: October 26th
- Game time: 2:00 p.m. EDT
- Game weather: Sunny • Temperature: 77 °F (25 °C) • Wind: N 5 miles per hour (8.0 km/h)
- Game attendance: 33,744
- Referee: Darryl DeBerry
- TV announcers (ESPN+): Mike Corey (play-by-play), Reggie Walker (analyst) and Smacker Miles (sideline)

Game information

First quarter

- (13:33) ECU – Anthony Smith 42-yard pass from Katin Houser, Noah Perez kick (Drive: 4 plays, 52 yards, 1:00; East Carolina 7–0)
- (8:04) TEM – Evan Simon 1-yard run, Maddux Trujillo kick (Drive: 10 plays, 75 yards, 5:29; Tied 7–7)
- (4:18) ECU – Jhari Patterson 17-yard pass from Katin Houser (Drive: 10 plays, 61 yards, 3:40; East Carolina 13–7)
- (3:22) TEM – Ashton Allen 60-yard pass from Evan Simon, Maddux Trujillo kick (Drive: 3 plays, 73 yards, 0:51; Temple 14–13)

Second quarter

- (9:39) TEM – Ashton Allen 27-yard pass from Evan Simon, Maddux Trujillo kick (Drive: 3 plays, 38 yards, 0:57; Temple 21–13)
- (6:29) ECU – Winston Wright Jr., 9-yard pass from Katin Houser, Andrew Conrad kick (Drive: 8 plays, 75 yards, 3:10; Temple 21–20)
- (0:08) ECU – Chase Sowell 45-yard pass from Katin Houser, Andrew Conrad kick (Drive: 3 plays, 60 yards, 0:19; East Carolina 27–21)

Third quarter

- (13:30) ECU – Rahjai Harris 4-yard run, Tyler Savage pass (Drive: 4 plays, 62 yards, 1:23; East Carolina 35–21)
- (6:25) TEM – Landon Morris 25-yard pass from Evan Simon, Maddux Trujillo kick (Drive: 13 plays, 79 yards, 6:59; East Carolina 35–28)
- (5:01) ECU – Marlon Gunn Jr., 7-yard run, Andrew Conrad kick (Drive: 4 plays, 75 yards, 1:24; East Carolina 42–28)
- (4:44) ECU – Ja'Marley Riddle 55-yard interception, Andrew Conrad kick (East Carolina 49–28)
- (3:39) ECU – Yannick Smith 16-yard pass from Katin Houser, Andrew Conrad kick (Drive: 2 plays, 20 yards, 0:34; East Carolina 56–28)

Fourth quarter

- (14:10) TEM – Terrez Worthy 7-yard run (Drive: 11 plays, 75 yards, 4:29; East Carolina 56–34)

Statistics	TEM	ECU
First downs	23	19
Plays–yards	79–405	65–500
Rushes–yards	38–111	36–231
Passing yards	294	269
Passing: Comp–Att–Int	23–41–3	16–29–2
Time of possession	33:27	26:33

Team	Category	Player	Statistics
Temple	Passing	Evan Simon	23/41, 294 yards, 3 TD, 3 INT
Temple	Rushing	Terrez Worthy	20 carries, 88 yards, TD
Temple	Receiving	Ashton Allen	4 receptions, 109 yards, 2 TD
East Carolina	Passing	Katin Houser	16/29, 269 yards, 5 TD, 2 INT
East Carolina	Rushing	Rahjai Harris	11 carries, 130 yards, TD
East Carolina	Receiving	Chase Sowell	4 receptions, 117 yards, TD

=== at Tulane ===
Temple Owls (2–6) at Tulane Green Wave (7–2) – Game summary

Quarter	1	2	3	4	Total
Owls	0	0	0	6	6
Green Wave	7	21	14	10	52

at Yulman Stadium • New Orleans, Louisiana

- Date: November 9th
- Game time: 4:00 p.m. EST
- Game weather: Cloudy • Temperature: 80 °F (27 °C) • Wind: SE 15 miles per hour (24 km/h)
- Game attendance: 30,000
- Referee: Darryl DeBerry
- TV announcers (ESPNU): Courtney Lyle (play-by-play) and Rene Ingoglia (analyst)

Game information

First quarter

- (10:16) TULN – Makhi Hughes 4-yard run, Patrick Durkin kick (Drive: 10 plays, 75 yards, 4:44; Tulane 7–0)

Second quarter

- (11:03) TULN – Shazz Preston 53-yard pass from Darian Mensah, Patrick Durkin kick (Drive: 2 plays, 61 yards, 0:42; Tulane 14–0)
- (5:14) TULN – Arnold Barnes III 2-yard run, Patrick Durkin kick (Drive: 7 plays, 57 yards, 4:21; Tulane 21–0)
- (1:45) TULN – Makhi Hughes 3-yard run, Patrick Durkin kick (Drive: 5 plays, 59 yards, 1:15; Tulane 28–0)

Third quarter

- (8:11) TULN – Arnold Barnes III 5-yard run, Patrick Durkin kick (Drive: 10 plays, 68 yards, 5:28; Tulane 35–0)
- (5:23) TULN – Alex Bauman 6-yard pass from Darian Mensah, Patrick Durkin kick (Drive: 4 plays, 67 yards, 1:45; Tulane 42–0)

Fourth quarter

- (14:15) TULN – Patrick Durkin 24-yard field goal (Drive: 8 plays, 50 yards, 4:27; Tulane 45–0)
- (7:23) TULN – Ty Thompson 50-yard run, Ethan Head kick (Drive: 3 plays, 42 yards, 0:58; Tulane 52–0)
- (7:09) TEM – Terrez Worthy 75-yard run (Drive: 1 play, 75 yards, 0:15; Tulane 52–6)

Statistics	TEM	TULN
First downs	5	26
Plays–yards	45–158	75–589
Rushes–yards	23–102	52–327
Passing yards	56	262
Passing: Comp–Att–Int	11–22–0	14–23–1
Time of possession	20:57	39:03

Team	Category	Player	Statistics
Temple	Passing	Evan Simon	11/22, 56 yards
Temple	Rushing	Terrez Worthy	5 carries, 80 yards, TD
Temple	Receiving	Daniel Evert	1 reception, 16 yards
Tulane	Passing	Darian Mensah	14/21, 262 yards, 2 TD, INT
Tulane	Rushing	Makhi Hughes	19 carries, 153 yards, 2 TD
Tulane	Receiving	Mario Williams	4 receptions, 94 yards

=== Florida Atlantic ===
Florida Atlantic Owls (2–7) at Temple Owls (2–7) – Game summary

Quarter	1	2	3	4	OT	Total
Florida Atlantic Owls	0	7	0	8	0	15
Temple Owls	3	0	3	9	3	18

at Lincoln Financial Field • Philadelphia, Pennsylvania

- Date: November 16th
- Game time: 2:00 p.m. EST
- Game weather: Sunny • Temperature: 61 °F (16 °C) • Wind: NW 13 miles per hour (21 km/h)
- Game attendance: 12,291
- Referee: Steve Anderson
- TV announcers (ESPN+): James Westling (play-by-play) and Barrett Brooks (analyst)

Game information

First quarter

- (11:52) TEM – Maddux Trujillo 54-yard field goal (Drive: 6 plays, 22 yards, 3:02; Temple 3–0)

Second quarter

- (11:53) FAU – C. J. Campbell Jr., 1-yard run, Morgan Suarez kick (Drive: 8 plays, 82 yards, 3:07; Florida Atlantic 7–3)

Third quarter

- (4:22) TEM – Maddux Trujillo 50-yard field goal (Drive: 7 plays, 24 yards, 2:21; Florida Atlantic 7–6)

Fourth quarter

- (7:15) TEM – Terrez Worthy 1-yard run (Drive: 15 plays, 87 yards, 8:45; Temple 12–7)
- (1:52) TEM – Maddux Trujillo 47-yard field goal (Drive: 8 plays, 40 yards, 4:21; Temple 15–7)
- (0:34) FAU – C. J. Campbell Jr., 1-yard run, Tyriq Starks pass (Drive: 9 plays, 75 yards, 1:18; Tied 15–15)

Overtime

- (0:00) TEM – Maddux Trujillo 39-yard field goal (Drive: 4 plays, 4 yards, 0:00; Temple 18–15)

Statistics	FAU	TEM
First downs	17	18
Plays–yards	67–317	80–348
Rushes–yards	31–123	39–130
Passing yards	194	218
Passing: Comp–Att–Int	19–36–0	24–41–0
Time of possession	22:59	37:01

Team	Category	Player	Statistics
Florida Atlantic	Passing	Kasen Weisman	11/23, 123 yards
Florida Atlantic	Rushing	C. J. Campbell Jr.	20 carries, 70 yards, 2 TD
Florida Atlantic	Receiving	C. J. Campbell Jr.	6 receptions, 57 yards
Temple	Passing	Evan Simon	24/41, 218 yards
Temple	Rushing	Antwain Littleton	13 carries, 54 yards
Temple	Receiving	Dante Wright	14 receptions, 147 yards

=== at UTSA ===
Temple Owls (3–7) at UTSA Roadrunners (5–5) – Game summary

Quarter	1	2	3	4	Total
Owls	3	14	7	3	27
Roadrunners	7	21	10	13	51

at Alamodome • San Antonio, Texas

- Date: November 22nd
- Game time: 7:00 p.m. EST
- Game weather: None (played indoors); 74 °F (23 °C)
- Game attendance: 20,121
- Referee: Edwin Lee
- TV announcers (ESPN2): Anish Shroff (play-by-play), Andre Ware (analyst) and Paul Carcaterra (sideline)

Game information

First quarter

- (10:47) UTSA – Robert Henry 40-yard run, Tate Sandell kick (Drive: 5 plays, 67 yards, 2:04; UTSA 7–0)
- (6:08) TEM – Maddux Trujillo 37-yard field goal (Drive: 6 plays, 22 yards, 1:04; UTSA 7–3)

Second quarter

- (10:54) UTSA – Owen McCown 75-yard run, Tate Sandell kick (Drive: 1 play, 75 yards, 0:14; UTSA 14–3)
- (4:37) TEM – Dante Wright 9-yard pass from Evan Simon, Maddux Trujillo kick (Drive: 6 plays, 30 yards, 2:24; UTSA 14–10)
- (4:24) UTSA – Chris Carpenter 97-yard kickoff return, Tate Sandell kick (UTSA 21–10)
- (1:57) UTSA – Robert Henry 8-yard run, Tate Sandell kick (Drive: 3 plays, 97 yards, 1:04; UTSA 28–10)
- (0:27) TEM – Antwain Littleton II 4-yard run, Maddux Trujillo kick (Drive: 7 plays, 75 yards, 1:23; UTSA 28–17)

Third quarter

- (11:58) UTSA – Chase Allen 23-yard field goal (Drive: 7 plays, 44 yards, 3:01; UTSA 31–17)
- (7:27) TEM – Dante Wright 61-yard pass from Evan Simon, Maddux Trujillo kick (Drive: 1 play, 61 yards, 0:10; UTSA 31–24)
- (4:59) UTSA – Willie McCoy 3-yard pass from Owen McCown, Tate Sandell kick (Drive: 2 plays, 43 yards, 0:26; UTSA 38–24)

Fourth quarter

- (14:56) TEM – Maddux Trujillo 33-yard field goal (Drive: 6 plays, 10 yards, 1:42; UTSA 38–27)
- (8:19) UTSA – Tate Sandell 47-yard field goal (Drive: 6 plays, 27 yards, 3:20; UTSA 41–27)
- (5:24) UTSA – Tate Sandell 42-yard field goal (Drive: 4 plays, 2 yards, 1:49; UTSA 44–27)
- (2:29) UTSA – Brandon High 3-yard run, Tate Sandell kick (Drive: 5 plays, 27 yards, 2:32; UTSA 51–27)

Statistics	TEM	UTSA
First downs	13	19
Plays–yards	69–289	66–529
Rushes–yards	37–70	39–309
Passing yards	219	220
Passing: Comp–Att–Int	13–32–2	20–27–2
Time of possession	29:45	30:15

Team	Category	Player	Statistics
Temple	Passing	Evan Simon	13/32, 219 yards, 2 TD, 2 INT
Temple	Rushing	Antwain Littleton	18 carries, 64 yards, TD
Temple	Receiving	Dante Wright	5 receptions, 128 yards, 2 TD
UTSA	Passing	Owen McCown	20/27, 220 yards, TD, 2 INT
UTSA	Rushing	Robert Henry	16 carries, 178 yards, 2 TD
UTSA	Receiving	David Amador II	7 receptions, 63 yards

=== North Texas ===
North Texas Mean Green (5–6) at Temple Owls (3–8) – Game summary

Quarter	1	2	3	4	Total
Mean Green	17	7	0	0	24
Owls	3	14	0	0	17

at Lincoln Financial Field • Philadelphia, Pennsylvania

- Date: November 30th
- Game time: 12:00 p.m. EST
- Game weather: Sunny • Temperature: 37 °F (3 °C) • Wind: W at 15 miles per hour (24 km/h)
- Game attendance: 11,589
- Referee: Reid Jackson
- TV announcers (ESPN+): Joe Tordy (play-by-play), Leger Douzable (analyst) and Maria Trivelpiece (sideline)

Game information

First quarter

- (12:19) UNT – DT Sheffield 14-yard pass from Chandler Morris, Kali Nguma kick (Drive: 8 plays, 75 yards, 2:41; UNT 7–0)
- (12:00) UNT – Kali Nguma 36-yard field goal (Drive: 4 plays, 0 yards, 0:11; UNT 10–0)
- (4:55) TEM – Maddux Trujillo 44-yard field goal (Drive: 5 plays, 27 yards, 2:13; UNT 10–3)
- (3:02) UNT – Makenzie McGill II 39-yard run, Kali Nguma kick (Drive: 7 plays, 75 yards, 1:53; UNT 17–3)

Second quarter

- (14:52) UNT – Makenzie McGill II 51-yard run, Kali Nguma kick (Drive: 3 plays, 60 yards, 1:22; UNT 24–3)
- (4:04) TEM – Joquez Smith 1-yard run, Maddux Trujillo kick (Drive: 3 plays, 58 yards, 0:52; UNT 24–10)
- (0:46) TEM – Evan Simon 1-yard run, Maddux Trujillo kick (Drive: 7 plays, 72 yards, 1:43; UNT 24–17)

Third quarter

No scoring plays

Fourth quarter

No scoring plays

Statistics	UNT	TEM
First downs	18	16
Plays–yards	78–433	73–345
Rushes–yards	38–253	29–77
Passing yards	180	268
Passing: Comp–Att–Int	21–40–0	27–44–1
Time of possession	28:46	31:14

Team	Category	Player	Statistics
North Texas	Passing	Chandler Morris	21/40, 180 yards, TD
North Texas	Rushing	Makenzie McGill II	14 carries, 155 yards, 2 TD
North Texas	Receiving	DT Sheffield	4 receptions, 47 yards, TD
Temple	Passing	Evan Simon	27/44, 268 yards, INT
Temple	Rushing	Joquez Smith	8 carries, 39 yards, TD
Temple	Receiving	John Adams	4 receptions, 63 yards
