= Evan Simon =

American football player

Profile
- Position: Quarterback

Personal information
- Born: Manheim, Pennsylvania, U.S.
- Listed height: 6 ft 3 in (1.91 m)
- Listed weight: 205 lb (93 kg)

Career information
- High school: Manheim Central (Manheim)
- College: Rutgers (2020–2023); Temple (2024–2025)
- NFL draft: 2026: undrafted
- Stats at ESPN

Evan Michael Simon is an American football quarterback. He previously played college football for the Rutgers Scarlet Knights and for the Temple Owls.

== Early life ==
Simon grew up in Mount Joy, Pennsylvania and attended Manheim Central High School. Coming out of high school, Simon was rated as a three-star recruit and committed to play college football for the Rutgers Scarlet Knights.

== College career ==
=== Rutgers ===
As a freshman in 2021, Simon completed 16 of 28 pass attempts for 145 yards and an interception. He finished the 2022 season playing in nine games with two starts, where he completed 79 of 133 passes for 777 yards and four touchdowns with six interceptions. In 2023, Simon appeared in just one game, where he completed two of three pass attempts for 30 yards and a touchdown. After the season, he entered his name into the NCAA transfer portal.

=== Temple ===
Simon transferred to play for the Temple Owls. In his first start in week 3 of the 2024 season, he completed 17 of 25 passing attempts for 185 yards, two touchdowns, and an interception in a loss to Coastal Carolina. In week 4, Simon completed 17 of 27 passes for 271 yards and five touchdowns and rushed for 49 yards and a touchdown as he led the Owls to their first win of the 2024 season, beating Utah State.

=== Statistics ===
Season	Team	Games			Passing								Rushing			
Season	Team	GP	GS	Record	Cmp	Att	Pct	Yds	Avg	TD	Int	Rtg	Att	Yds	Avg	TD
2020	Rutgers	Redshirted (redshirt)														
2021	Rutgers	6	0	—	16	28	57.1	145	5.2	0	1	93.5	8	6	0.8	0
2022	Rutgers	9	2	1–1	79	137	57.7	777	5.7	4	6	106.2	22	-2	-0.1	0
2023	Rutgers	1	0	—	2	3	66.7	30	10.0	1	0	260.7	0	0	0.0	0
2024	Temple	9	9	3–6	181	308	58.8	2,032	6.6	15	9	124.4	87	20	0.2	3
2025	Temple	12	12	5–7	189	313	60.4	2,097	6.7	25	2	141.7	76	192	2.5	2
Career		37	23	9–14	467	789	59.2	5,081	6.4	45	18	127.5	193	216	1.1	5
