= Landon Morris =

American football player (born 2002)

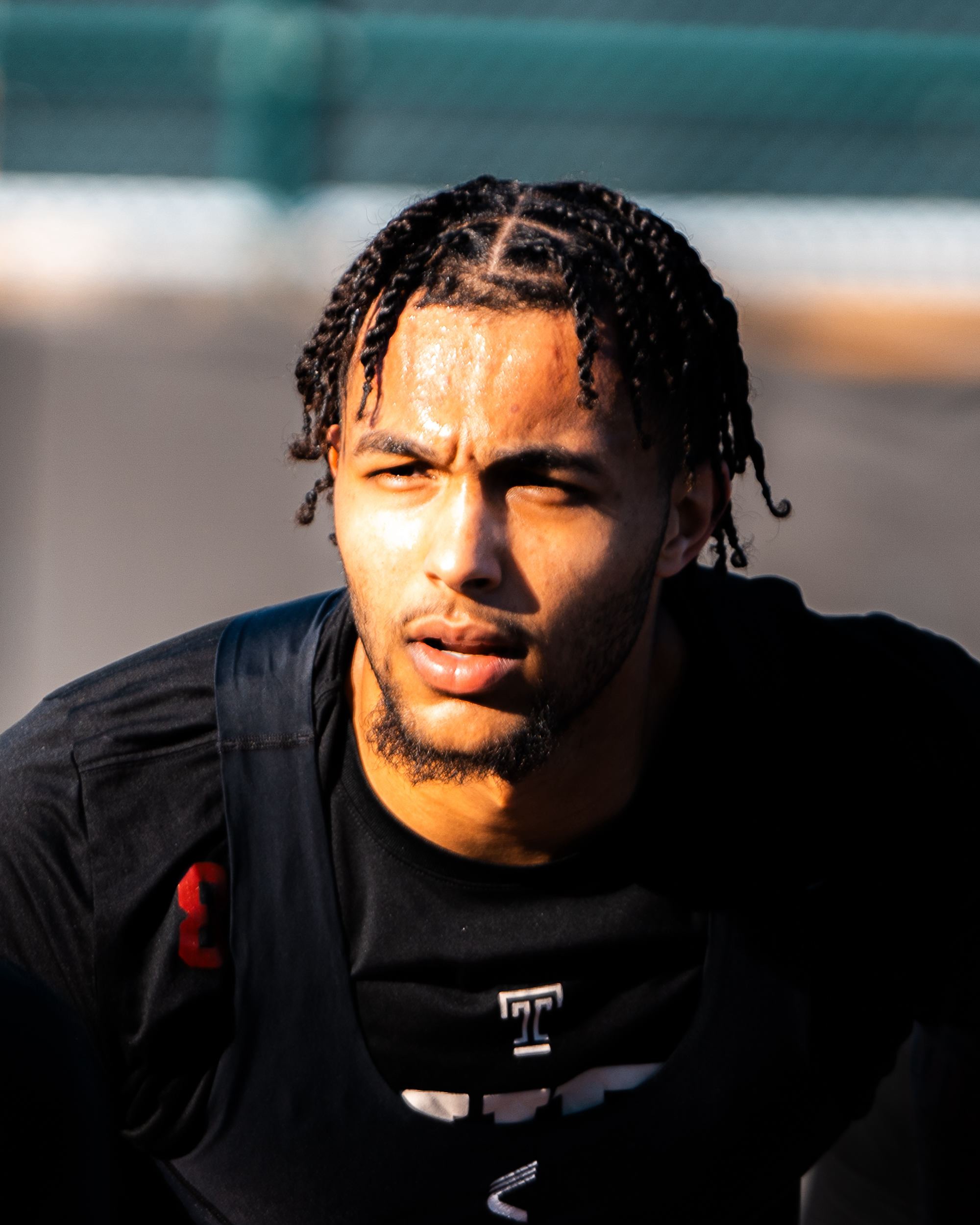

No. 81 – Wake Forest Demon Deacons
- Position: Tight end
- Class: Redshirt Senior

Personal information
- Born: December 21, 2002 (age 23); Indianapolis, Indiana, U.S.
- Listed height: 6 ft 5 in (1.96 m)
- Listed weight: 240 lb (109 kg)

Career information
- High school: Fishers (Fishers, Indiana)
- College: Syracuse (2021); Utah (2022); Temple (2023–2024); California (2025); Wake Forest (2026–present)
- Stats at ESPN

Landon Morris (born December 21, 2002) is an American college football tight end for the Wake Forest Demon Deacons. He previously played for the Syracuse Orange, Utah Utes, Temple Owls and the California Golden Bears. He was listed by Sports Illustrated as one of the top ten tight end prospects in his recruiting class.

== Early life and education ==
Morris was born in Indianapolis, Indiana, to Hilton and Lori Morris. His father played baseball at the University of Nevada, Las Vegas (UNLV), and his mother, a former Indiana Miss Basketball, was named a McDonald's All-American in 1997. His sister, Lauren Morris, played basketball at Holy Cross College in Indiana.

Morris attended Hamilton Southeastern High School, where he played football and basketball. He later transferred to Nazareth Academy in Illinois, where he was a three-star recruit. While at Nazareth, he recorded 81 receptions for 1,456 yards and 13 touchdowns. He was named to the All-HCC first team and was listed as one of the top 10 tight end prospects in his class. During the COVID-19 pandemic, he returned to Indianapolis and completed his senior season at Fishers High School.

== College career ==
In 2021, Morris signed with Syracuse University. He entered the NCAA transfer portal later that year and participated in spring practices before transferring to the University of Utah. He did not appear in a game for Utah.

Morris was ineligible to compete in 2023 due to NCAA transfer regulations governing multiple transfers. During the season, he was named Offensive Scout Team Player of the Week twice.

In 2024, Morris transferred to Temple University, where he made his collegiate debut. On October 19, he recorded a career-high four receptions for 97 yards, including a 58-yard catch, against the University of Tulsa. On October 26, he scored his first collegiate touchdown on a 25-yard reception against East Carolina.

=== Statistics ===
Temple University Owls
Year	Lng	Rec	Yards	Avg	TDs
2024	58	16	251	15.7	1
2025	26	7	94	13.4	2
Career	58	23	345	15.0	3
