= Winston Wright Jr. =

American football player (born 2001)

Profile
- Position: Wide receiver

Personal information
- Born: June 9, 2001 (age 25); Savannah, Georgia, U.S.
- Listed height: 5 ft 10 in (1.78 m)
- Listed weight: 192 lb (87 kg)

Career information
- High school: Memorial Day School (Savannah, Georgia)
- College: West Virginia (2019–2021); Florida State (2022–2023); East Carolina (2024)
- NFL draft: 2025: undrafted

Career history
- Cleveland Browns (2025)*
- * Offseason or practice squad member only

Awards and highlights
- Second-team All-Big 12 (2020)

Winston Wright Jr. (born June 9, 2001) is an American football wide receiver. He played college football for the West Virginia Mountaineers, Florida State Seminoles and for the East Carolina Pirates.

== Early life ==
Wright Jr. attended high school at Memorial Day School located in Savannah, Georgia. During his sophomore season he rushed for 1,039 yards and 14 touchdowns, where he earned offers from schools such as Western Kentucky, UCF, Georgia State, Liberty, and Wake Forest. Coming out of high school, Wright Jr. was rated as a three star recruit, where he committed to play college football for the West Virginia Mountaineers over offers from other schools such as North Carolina, Kansas State, and Duke.

== College career ==
=== West Virginia ===
During his three-year career at West Virginia from 2019 through 2021, Wright Jr. was a two-year starter, where he totaled 129 receptions for 1,338 yards, and seven touchdowns, where he earned second-team all-Big 12 honors in 2020. After the conclusion of the 2021 season, he decided to enter his name into the NCAA transfer portal.

=== Florida State ===
Wright Jr. transferred to play for the Florida State Seminoles. Heading into the 2022 season, Wright Jr. was involved in a car crash, where he suffered a season ending leg injury. Mid-way through the 2023 season, he stepped away from the team, and entered his name into the NCAA transfer portal. Wright Jr. finished the 2023 season, hauling in four passes for 36 yards before leaving the team.

=== East Carolina ===
Wright Jr. transferred to play for the East Carolina Pirates. In his lone season with the Pirates, he played in eleven games, making ten starts, where he totaled 54 receptions for 556 yards and eight touchdowns, while also adding 91 yards on 13 carries, and returning 22 kickoffs for 590 yards and a touchdown. For his performance during the 2024 season, he was named second team all-American as a returner. After the conclusion of the season, Wright Jr. decided to enter his name into the 2025 NFL draft.

== Professional career ==
After not being selected in the 2025 NFL draft, Wright Jr. signed with the Cleveland Browns as an undrafted free agent. He was waived on August 3, 2025.
