= Robert Henry Jr. =

American football player (born 2001)

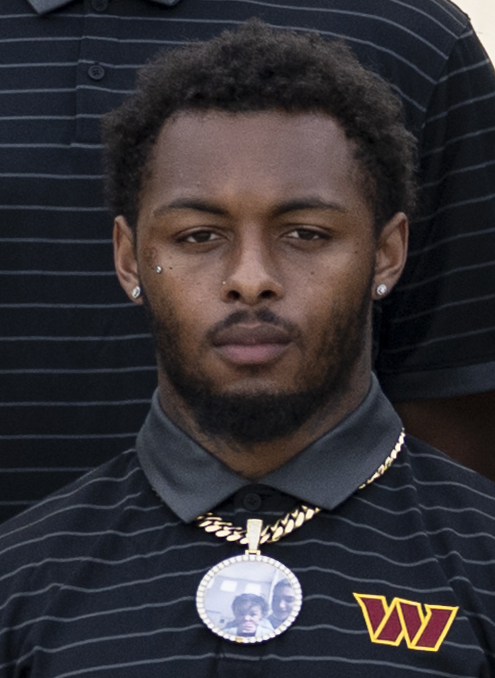
- Henry with the Washington Commanders in 2026

No. 34 – Washington Commanders
- Position: Running back
- Roster status: Active

Personal information
- Born: December 31, 2001 (age 24)
- Listed height: 5 ft 9 in (1.75 m)
- Listed weight: 196 lb (89 kg)

Career information
- High school: Lumberton (Lumberton, Mississippi)
- College: Jones (2021–2022); UTSA (2023–2025)
- NFL draft: 2026: undrafted

Career history
- Washington Commanders (2026)*; Seattle Seahawks (2026); Washington Commanders (2026–present)
- * Offseason or practice squad member only

Awards and highlights
- First-team All-American Conference (2025)
- Stats at Pro Football Reference

Robert Henry Jr. (born December 31, 2001) is an American professional football running back for the Washington Commanders of the National Football League (NFL). Henry played college football for the Jones Bobcats and UTSA Roadrunners and signed with the Commanders as an undrafted free agent in 2026.

== Early life ==
Henry Jr. attended Lumberton High School in Lumberton, Mississippi. During his high school career, he ran over 7,000 yards and 99 touchdowns, earning four all-state honors and two Class 4A Mr. Football awards. Henry Jr. received multiple NCAA Division I offers from schools such as South Carolina, Kentucky, and Coastal Carolina, but committed to play college football at Jones College in Mississippi, a junior college.

== College career ==
=== Jones College ===
As a freshman in 2021, Henry Jr. rushed for 495 yards and six touchdowns in 10 games. He entered the 2022 season as the starting running back. Henry Jr. rushed for 1,302 yards and 18 touchdowns on the season, adding 19 receptions and 128 yards, and won the inaugural Walter Jones Trophy.

=== UTSA ===
Henry Jr. transferred to play for the UTSA Roadrunners. In 2023, he ran for 588 yards and 11 touchdowns. Henry Jr. finished the 2024 season, running for 706 yards and seven touchdowns. In the 2025 season opener, he ran for 177 yards and two touchdowns in a loss to Texas A&M. In week 3, Henry Jr. rushed for 144 yards and two touchdowns in a victory versus Incarnate Word. In week 4, he totaled 220 all-purpose yards and two touchdowns in a win against Colorado State.

== Professional career ==
Pre-draft measurables
Height	Weight	Arm length	Hand span	Wingspan	40-yard dash	10-yard split	20-yard split	20-yard shuttle	Three-cone drill	Vertical jump	Broad jump	Bench press
5 ft 9 1/4 in (1.76 m)	196 lb (89 kg)	30 1/8 in (0.77 m)	9 1/8 in (0.23 m)	6 ft 0 1/8 in (1.83 m)	4.52 s	1.56 s	2.59 s	4.10 s	7.11 s	37.0 in (0.94 m)	10 ft 5 in (3.18 m)	17 reps
All values from NFL Combine/Pro Day

=== Washington Commanders (first stint) ===
Henry signed with the Washington Commanders as an undrafted free agent on May 7, 2026. He was released by the Commanders on August 30, and subsequently re-signed to their practice squad the following day.

=== Seattle Seahawks ===
On October 6, 2026, Henry was signed by the Seattle Seahawks off the Commanders practice squad. He was waived on November 2.

=== Washington Commanders (second stint) ===
On November 3, 2026, Henry was claimed off waivers by the Commanders.
