= 2025 Gator Bowl =

2025 Gator Bowl may refer to one of the following college football bowl games:

- 2025 Gator Bowl (January), featuring the Duke Blue Devils and Ole Miss Rebels
- 2025 Gator Bowl (December), featuring the Virginia Cavaliers and Missouri Tigers

== See also ==
- Gator Bowl
