= 2024–25 NCAA football bowl games =

Series of college football bowl games following the 2024 season

- Season: 2024
- Number of bowls: 62 total: 47 in D-I (Note: 11 College Football Playoff (CFP) games, 35 non-CFP FBS bowl games, and 1 FCS bowl game.); 2 in D-II; 13 in D-III
- All-star games: 4 FBS, 2 FCS
- Bowl games: December 14, 2024 – January 20, 2025 (Note: Dates reflect Division I team-competitive bowl games, and exclude all-star games and bowl games in lower divisions.)
- National Championship: 2025 College Football Playoff; National Championship
- Location of Championship: Mercedes-Benz Stadium; Atlanta, Georgia (Note: The championship game was originally scheduled to be played at Allegiant Stadium in Paradise, Nevada, but was moved due to a scheduling conflict with the Consumer Electronics Show (CES).)
- Champions: Ohio State Buckeyes
- Bowl Challenge Cup winner: The American
Bowl record by conference
Conference	Bowls	Record	Number of teams in final AP poll
ACC	13	2–11 (0.154)	4
American	8	6–2 (0.750)	2
Big 12	9	4–5 (0.444)	4
Big Ten	17	11–6 (0.647)	5
C–USA	5	1–4 (0.200)	0
MAC	7	5–2 (0.714)	0
Mountain West	5	1–4 (0.200)	2
Pac-12	1	0–1 (0.000)	0
SEC	15	8–7 (0.533)	7
Sun Belt	7	4–3 (0.571)	0
Independent	5	4–1 (0.800)	1
- Note: CFP first-round games are included

The 2024–25 NCAA football bowl games were a series of college football bowl games in the United States, primarily played to complete the 2024 NCAA Division I FBS football season. Team-competitive bowl games in the Football Bowl Subdivision (FBS) began on December 14, 2024, and concluded with the 2025 College Football Playoff National Championship on January 20, 2025. Several all-star games then followed.

== Schedule ==
The schedule for the 2024–25 bowl games was announced on June 6, 2024.

=== Division I FBS bowl games ===
==== College Football Playoff bowl games ====
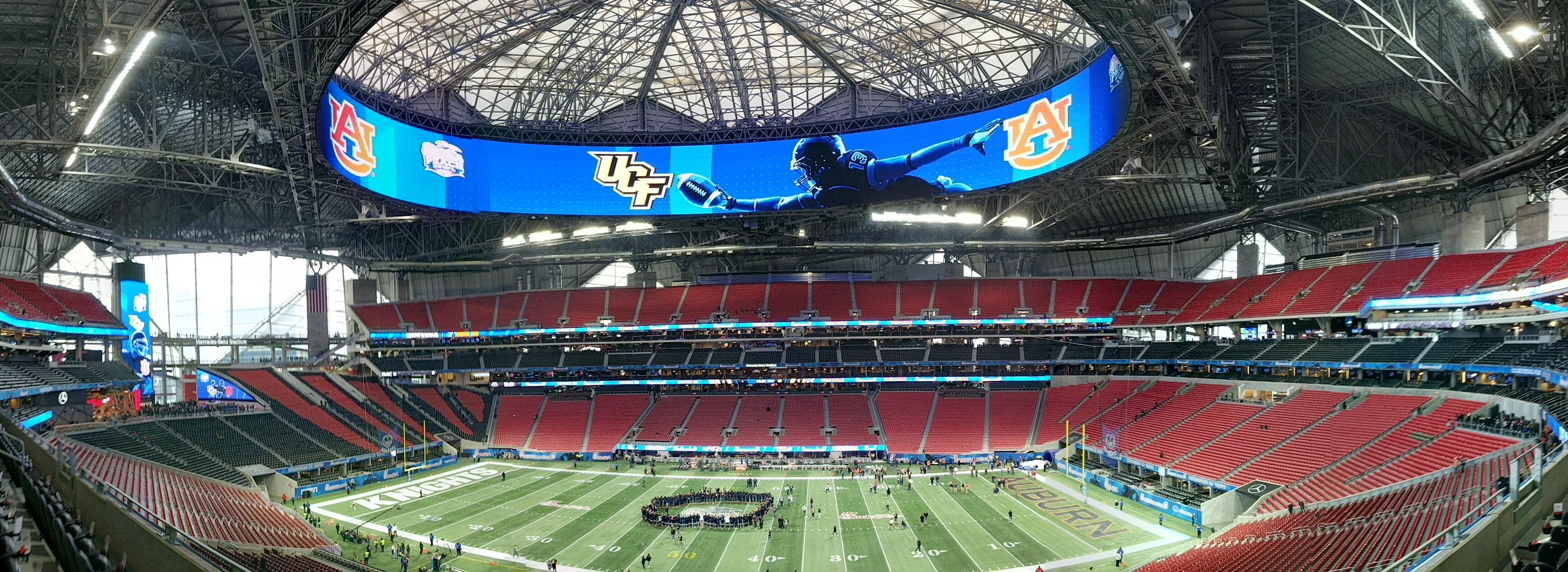
Mercedes-Benz Stadium, site of the championship game

The College Football Playoff system is used to determine a national championship of Division I FBS college football. This is the 11th year of the College Football Playoff era. For the 2024–25 season, the playoffs were expanded from four teams to 12 teams.

A committee of experts ranked the top 25 FBS teams after each of the final six weeks of the regular season. Upon release of the final rankings, the top five ranked conference champions were selected to compete, along with the seven highest ranked remaining teams. The top four conference champions received a first-round bye.

The first round of games was played at campus sites on December 20 and 21, 2024. The quarterfinal and semifinal rounds were played at the New Year's Six bowl games. The quarterfinal games were played from December 31, 2024 through January 2, 2025, at the Fiesta Bowl, Peach Bowl, Rose Bowl, and Sugar Bowl. The semifinal games were played on January 9 and 10, 2025, at the Orange Bowl and Cotton Bowl. The winners advanced to the 2025 College Football Playoff National Championship on January 20, 2025, at Mercedes-Benz Stadium in Atlanta.

First round
Dec 21 – Ohio Stadium
**8**	**Ohio State**	**42**
9	Tennessee	17
Dec 21 – DKR–Texas Memorial Stadium
**5**	**Texas**	**38**
12	Clemson	24
Dec 20 – Notre Dame Stadium
**7**	**Notre Dame**	**27**
10	Indiana	17
Dec 21 – Beaver Stadium
**6**	**Penn State**	**38**
11	SMU	10

Quarterfinals
Jan 1 – Rose Bowl, Rose Bowl
1	Oregon	21
**8**	**Ohio State**	**41**
Jan 1 – Peach Bowl, Mercedes-Benz Stadium
4	Arizona State	31
**5**	**Texas (2OT)**	**39**
Jan 2 – Sugar Bowl, Caesars Superdome
2	Georgia	10
**7**	**Notre Dame**	**23**
Dec 31 – Fiesta Bowl, State Farm Stadium
3	Boise State	14
**6**	**Penn State**	**31**

Semifinals
Jan 10 – Cotton Bowl Classic, AT&T Stadium
**8**	**Ohio State**	**28**
5	Texas	14
Jan 9 – Orange Bowl, Hard Rock Stadium
**7**	**Notre Dame**	**27**
6	Penn State	24

Championship
Jan 20 – Mercedes-Benz Stadium
**8**	**Ohio State**	**34**
7	Notre Dame	23

Locations of the 12 playoff participants (teams in bold received byes to the quarterfinals)
Big Ten, SEC, ACC, Big 12, Mountain West, Independent
Locations of the playoff games: campus site first round games (green), quarterfinals (blue), semifinals (red), and the national championship (black)

All times are EST (UTC−5).

College Football Playoff games
Date	Time	Game	Site	Teams	Affiliations	Results	Attendance	Television	
Date	Time	Game	Site	Teams	Affiliations	Results	Attendance	Network	U.S. viewers (millions)
Dec 20	8:00 pm	On-campus (First round)	Notre Dame Stadium; Notre Dame, Indiana	No. 5 Notre Dame Fighting Irish (11–1); No. 8 Indiana Hoosiers (11–1)	Independent; Big Ten	**Notre Dame 27**; Indiana 17	77,622	ABC, ESPN, ESPN2, ESPNews	13.39
Dec 21	Noon	On-campus (First round)	Beaver Stadium; University Park, Pennsylvania	No. 4 Penn State Nittany Lions (11–2); No. 10 SMU Mustangs (11–2)	Big Ten; ACC	**Penn State 38**; SMU 10	106,013	TNT Sports (TNT, TBS, TruTV, Max)	6.60
Dec 21	4:00 pm	On-campus (First round)	Texas Memorial Stadium; Austin, Texas	No. 3 Texas Longhorns (11–2); No. 16 Clemson Tigers (10–3)	SEC; ACC	**Texas 38**; Clemson 24	101,150	TNT Sports (TNT, TBS, TruTV, Max)	8.90
Dec 21	8:00 pm	On-campus (First round)	Ohio Stadium; Columbus, Ohio	No. 6 Ohio State Buckeyes (10–2); No. 7 Tennessee Volunteers (10–2)	Big Ten; SEC	**Ohio State 42**; Tennessee 17	102,870	ABC, ESPN, ESPN2, ESPNU, ESPNews	14.68
Dec 31	7:30 pm	Fiesta Bowl (Quarterfinal)	State Farm Stadium; Glendale, Arizona	No. 4 Penn State Nittany Lions (12–2); No. 9 Boise State Broncos (12–1)	Big Ten; MW	**Penn State 31**; Boise State 14	63,854	ESPN, ESPN2, ESPNU	13.9
Jan 1	1:00 pm	Peach Bowl (Quarterfinal)	Mercedes-Benz Stadium; Atlanta, Georgia	No. 3 Texas Longhorns (12–2); No. 12 Arizona State Sun Devils (11–2)	SEC; Big 12	**Texas 39**; Arizona State 31 ^{(2OT)}	71,105	ESPN, ESPN2, ESPNU	17.3
Jan 1	5:00 pm	Rose Bowl (Quarterfinal)	Rose Bowl; Pasadena, California	No. 6 Ohio State Buckeyes (11–2); No. 1 Oregon Ducks (13–0)	Big Ten; Big Ten	**Ohio State 41**; Oregon 21	90,732	ESPN, ESPN2, ESPNU, ESPNews	21.1
Jan 2	4:00 pm	Sugar Bowl (Quarterfinal)	Caesars Superdome; New Orleans, Louisiana	No. 5 Notre Dame Fighting Irish (12–1); No. 2 Georgia Bulldogs (11–2)	Independent; SEC	**Notre Dame 23**; Georgia 10	57,267	ESPN, ESPNU, ESPNews	15.8
Jan 9	7:30 pm	Orange Bowl (Semifinal)	Hard Rock Stadium; Miami Gardens, Florida	No. 5 Notre Dame Fighting Irish (13–1); No. 4 Penn State Nittany Lions (13–2)	Independent; Big Ten	**Notre Dame 27**; Penn State 24	66,881	ESPN, ESPN2, ESPNU, ESPNews	17.8
Jan 10	7:30 pm	Cotton Bowl (Semifinal)	AT&T Stadium; Arlington, Texas	No. 6 Ohio State Buckeyes (12–2); No. 3 Texas Longhorns (13–2)	Big Ten; SEC	**Ohio State 28**; Texas 14	74,527	ESPN, ESPN2, ESPNU, ESPNews	20.9
Jan 20	7:30 pm	College Football Playoff; National Championship	Mercedes-Benz Stadium; Atlanta, Georgia	No. 6 Ohio State Buckeyes (13–2); No. 5 Notre Dame Fighting Irish (14–1)	Big Ten; Independent	**Ohio State 34**; Notre Dame 23	77,660	ESPN, ESPN2, ESPNU, ESPNews	22.1

==== Non-CFP bowl games ====
Several changes, as compared to the 2023–24 bowl season, were announced:

- The Holiday Bowl changed venues, from Petco Park to Snapdragon Stadium.
- The Cure Bowl also changed venues, from FBC Mortgage Stadium to Camping World Stadium.
- On October 8, 2024, strategic investment company GameAbove, through its GameAbove Sports brand, was announced as the new title sponsor for the Quick Lane Bowl, renaming it the GameAbove Sports Bowl.
- On October 15, 2024, military contractor Integrated Solutions for Systems (IS4S) was announced as the new title sponsor of the Camellia Bowl, with the game being renamed as the Salute to Veterans Bowl.
- On October 17, 2024, the Guaranteed Rate Bowl was renamed as the Rate Bowl, due to a rebranding by its title sponsor, as Guaranteed Rate became simply Rate.

Bowl games that were not part of the College Football Playoff are listed below. Final CFP rankings, issued before these games were played, are listed where applicable.

Non-College Football Playoff games
Date	Time (EST)	Game	Site	Teams	Affiliations	Results	Attendance	Television	
Date	Time (EST)	Game	Site	Teams	Affiliations	Results	Attendance	Network	U.S. viewers (millions)
Dec 14	9:00 pm	Salute to Veterans Bowl	Cramton Bowl; Montgomery, Alabama	South Alabama Jaguars (6–6); Western Michigan Broncos (6–6)	Sun Belt; MAC	**South Alabama 30**; Western Michigan 23	12,021	ESPN	
Dec 17	9:00 pm	Frisco Bowl	Toyota Stadium; Frisco, Texas	No. 25 Memphis Tigers (10–2); West Virginia Mountaineers (6–6)	American; Big 12	**Memphis 42**; West Virginia 37	12,022	ESPN	1.20
Dec 18	5:30 pm	Boca Raton Bowl	FAU Stadium; Boca Raton, Florida	James Madison Dukes (8–4); Western Kentucky Hilltoppers (8–5)	Sun Belt; CUSA	**James Madison 27**; Western Kentucky 17	15,808	ESPN	
Dec 18	9:00 pm	LA Bowl	SoFi Stadium; Inglewood, California	No. 24 UNLV Rebels (10–3); California Golden Bears (Note: Former Pac-12 team; considered for bowls with tie-ins to that conference for this bowl season.) (6–6)	MW; ACC	**UNLV 24**; California 13	24,420	ESPN	1.48
Dec 19	7:00 pm	New Orleans Bowl	Caesars Superdome; New Orleans, Louisiana	Sam Houston Bearkats (9–3); Georgia Southern Eagles (8–4)	CUSA; Sun Belt	**Sam Houston 31**; Georgia Southern 26	13,151	ESPN2	0.753
Dec 20	Noon	Cure Bowl	Camping World Stadium; Orlando, Florida	Ohio Bobcats (10–3); Jacksonville State Gamecocks (9–4)	MAC; CUSA	**Ohio 30**; Jacksonville State 27	10,518	ESPN	0.958
Dec 20	3:30 pm	Gasparilla Bowl	Raymond James Stadium; Tampa, Florida	Florida Gators (7–5); Tulane Green Wave (9–4)	SEC; American	**Florida 33**; Tulane 8	41,472	ESPN2	1.78
Dec 23	11:00 am	Myrtle Beach Bowl	Brooks Stadium; Conway, South Carolina	UTSA Roadrunners (6–6); Coastal Carolina Chanticleers (6–6)	American; Sun Belt	**UTSA 44**; Coastal Carolina 15	8,164	ESPN	0.767
Dec 23	2:30 pm	Famous Idaho Potato Bowl	Albertsons Stadium; Boise, Idaho	Northern Illinois Huskies (7–5); Fresno State Bulldogs (6–6)	MAC; MW	**Northern Illinois 28**; Fresno State 20^{(2OT)}	10,359	ESPN	1.32
Dec 24	8:00 pm	Hawaii Bowl	Ching Athletics Complex; Honolulu, Hawaii	South Florida Bulls (6–6); San Jose State Spartans (7–5)	American; MW	**South Florida 41**; San Jose State 39^{(5OT)}	6,720	ESPN	1.93
Dec 26	2:00 pm	GameAbove Sports Bowl	Ford Field; Detroit, Michigan	Toledo Rockets (7–5); Pittsburgh Panthers (7–5)	MAC; ACC	**Toledo 48**; Pittsburgh 46^{(6OT)}	26,219	ESPN	2.56
Dec 26	5:30 pm	Rate Bowl	Chase Field; Phoenix, Arizona	Kansas State Wildcats (8–4); Rutgers Scarlet Knights (7–5)	Big 12; Big Ten	**Kansas State 44**; Rutgers 41	21,659	ESPN	3.50
Dec 26	9:00 pm	68 Ventures Bowl	Hancock Whitney Stadium; Mobile, Alabama	Arkansas State Red Wolves (7–5); Bowling Green Falcons (7–5)	Sun Belt; MAC	**Arkansas State 38**; Bowling Green 31	19,582	ESPN	1.68
Dec 27	Noon	Armed Forces Bowl	Amon G. Carter Stadium; Fort Worth, Texas	Navy Midshipmen (9–3); Oklahoma Sooners (6–6)	American; SEC	**Navy 21**; Oklahoma 20	50,754	ESPN	2.85
Dec 27	3:30 pm	Birmingham Bowl	Protective Stadium; Birmingham, Alabama	Vanderbilt Commodores (6–6); Georgia Tech Yellow Jackets (7–5)	SEC; ACC	**Vanderbilt 35**; Georgia Tech 27	33,840	ESPN	4.05
Dec 27	7:00 pm	Liberty Bowl	Simmons Bank Liberty Stadium; Memphis, Tennessee	Arkansas Razorbacks (6–6); Texas Tech Red Raiders (8–4)	SEC; Big 12	**Arkansas 39**; Texas Tech 26	37,764	ESPN	4.21
Dec 27	8:00 pm	Holiday Bowl	Snapdragon Stadium; San Diego, California	No. 21 Syracuse Orange (9–3); Washington State Cougars (8–4)	ACC; Pac-12	**Syracuse 52**; Washington State 35	23,920	Fox	2.93
Dec 27	10:30 pm	Las Vegas Bowl	Allegiant Stadium; Las Vegas, Nevada (Note: Allegiant Stadium is located outside the Las Vegas city limits in the unincorporated community of Paradise, Nevada. "Las Vegas" is the official mailing address for all unincorporated areas in the vicinity of the city, including Paradise.)	USC Trojans (6–6); Texas A&M Aggies (8–4)	Big Ten; SEC	**USC 35**; Texas A&M 31	26,671	ESPN	2.75
Dec 28	11:00 am	Fenway Bowl	Fenway Park; Boston, Massachusetts	UConn Huskies (8–4); North Carolina Tar Heels (6–6)	Independent; ACC	**UConn 27**; North Carolina 14	27,900	ESPN	2.11
Dec 28	Noon	Pinstripe Bowl	Yankee Stadium; Bronx, New York	Nebraska Cornhuskers (6–6); Boston College Eagles (7–5)	Big Ten; ACC	**Nebraska 20**; Boston College 15	30,062	ABC	4.19
Dec 28	2:15 pm	New Mexico Bowl	University Stadium; Albuquerque, New Mexico	TCU Horned Frogs (8–4); Louisiana Ragin' Cajuns (10–3)	Big 12; Sun Belt	**TCU 34**; Louisiana 3	22,827	ESPN	1.22
Dec 28	3:30 pm	Pop-Tarts Bowl	Camping World Stadium; Orlando, Florida	No. 18 Iowa State Cyclones (10–3); No. 13 Miami (FL) Hurricanes (10–2)	Big 12; ACC	**Iowa State 42**; Miami (FL) 41	38,650	ABC	6.79
Dec 28	4:30 pm	Arizona Bowl	Arizona Stadium; Tucson, Arizona	Miami (OH) RedHawks (8–5); Colorado State Rams (8–4)	MAC; MW	**Miami (OH) 43**; Colorado State 17	40,076	The CW	0.567
Dec 28	5:45 pm	Military Bowl	Memorial Stadium; Annapolis, Maryland	East Carolina Pirates (7–5); NC State Wolfpack (6–6)	American; ACC	**East Carolina 26**; NC State 21	23,981	ESPN	0.886
Dec 28	7:30 pm	Alamo Bowl	Alamodome; San Antonio, Texas	No. 17 BYU Cougars (10–2); No. 23 Colorado Buffaloes (9–3)	Big 12; Big 12	**BYU 36**; Colorado 14	64,261	ABC	8.00
Dec 28	9:15 pm	Independence Bowl	Independence Stadium; Shreveport, Louisiana	No. 22 Army Black Knights (11–2); Louisiana Tech Bulldogs (5–7)	American; CUSA	**Army 27**; Louisiana Tech 6	34,283	ESPN	1.14
Dec 30	2:30 pm	Music City Bowl	Nissan Stadium; Nashville, Tennessee	No. 19 Missouri Tigers (9–3); Iowa Hawkeyes (8–4)	SEC; Big Ten	**Missouri 27**; Iowa 24	43,375	ESPN	2.82
Dec 31	Noon	ReliaQuest Bowl	Raymond James Stadium; Tampa, Florida	Michigan Wolverines (7–5); No. 11 Alabama Crimson Tide (9–3)	Big Ten; SEC	**Michigan 19**; Alabama 13	51,439	ESPN	6.55
Dec 31	2:00 pm	Sun Bowl	Sun Bowl; El Paso, Texas	Louisville Cardinals (8–4); Washington Huskies (6–6)	ACC; Big Ten	**Louisville 35**; Washington 34	40,826	CBS	
Dec 31	3:00 pm	Citrus Bowl	Camping World Stadium; Orlando, Florida	No. 20 Illinois Fighting Illini (9–3); No. 15 South Carolina Gamecocks (9–3)	Big Ten; SEC	**Illinois 21**; South Carolina 17	47,129	ABC	4.26
Dec 31	3:30 pm	Texas Bowl	NRG Stadium; Houston, Texas	LSU Tigers (8–4); Baylor Bears (8–4)	SEC; Big 12	**LSU 44**; Baylor 31	59,940	ESPN	4.21
Jan 2	8:00 pm	Gator Bowl	EverBank Stadium; Jacksonville, Florida	No. 14 Ole Miss Rebels (9–3); Duke Blue Devils (9–3)	SEC; ACC	**Ole Miss 52**; Duke 20	31,290	ESPN	5.03
Jan 3	4:00 pm	First Responder Bowl	Gerald J. Ford Stadium; Dallas, Texas (Note: The stadium is physically located in University Park, Texas, a separate city contained within the Dallas city limits. All locations in University Park have a Dallas mailing address.)	Texas State Bobcats (7–5); North Texas Mean Green (6–6)	Sun Belt; American	**Texas State 30**; North Texas 28	28,725	ESPN	1.70
Jan 3	7:30 pm	Duke's Mayo Bowl	Bank of America Stadium; Charlotte, North Carolina	Minnesota Golden Gophers (7–5); Virginia Tech Hokies (6–6)	Big Ten; ACC	**Minnesota 24**; Virginia Tech 10	31,927	ESPN	3.38
Jan 4	11:00 am	Bahamas Bowl	Thomas Robinson Stadium; Nassau, The Bahamas	Buffalo Bulls (8–4); Liberty Flames (8–3)	MAC; CUSA	**Buffalo 26**; Liberty 7	4,610	ESPN2	1.14

=== Division I FCS bowl game ===
The Football Championship Subdivision (FCS) has one bowl game, the Celebration Bowl. Played between HBCUs, it serves as a de facto Black college football national championship. The FCS also has a postseason bracket tournament that culminates in the 2025 NCAA Division I Football Championship Game.

Date	Time (EST)	Game	Site	Television	Teams	Affiliations	Results
Dec 14	Noon	Celebration Bowl	Mercedes-Benz Stadium; Atlanta, Georgia	USA: ABC; Canada: TSN1/4	Jackson State Tigers; South Carolina State Bulldogs	SWAC; MEAC	**Jackson State 28**; South Carolina State 7

=== Division II bowl games ===
Two bowl games were held which featured teams that did not qualify for the Division II postseason tournament. This is down from four bowl games in the previous season, as the Live United Texarkana Bowl went defunct and the Florida Beach Bowl was not held for 2024 due to funding issues. Additionally, a regular season conference game between North Greenville and Shorter was postponed due to Hurricane Helene; it was rescheduled for the first week of the Division II postseason, restructured as a quasi-bowl game and dubbed the "Helene Relief Bowl".

Date	Time (EST)	Game	Site	Television	Teams	Affiliations	Results
Dec 7	1:00 pm	Heritage Bowl	Tiger Stadium; Corsicana, Texas	Livestream	UT Permian Basin; Central Missouri	LSC; MIAA	**Central Missouri 39**; UT Permian Basin 37 (2OT)
Dec 7	2:00 pm	America's Crossroads Bowl	Hobart High School; Hobart, Indiana	Livestream	Truman; Tiffin	GLVC; GMAC	**Truman 29**; Tiffin 10

=== Division III bowl games ===
Division III held 13 bowl games in 2024, featuring teams that did not qualify for the Division III postseason tournament; this is the same number of games contested in 2023 season, but saw the addition of the Fusion Bowl and two bowls organized by NIL company Opendorse, as well as the subtraction of the ECAC Lynah Bowl and the New England Bowl series.

Date	Time (EST)	Game	Site	Television	Teams	Affiliations	Results
Nov 23	Noon	Centennial-MAC; Bowl Series	Campus sites	CentennialTV; MACtv (streaming)	Widener; Muhlenberg*	Centennial; MAC	**Muhlenberg 34**; Widener 7
Nov 23	Noon	Centennial-MAC; Bowl Series	Campus sites	CentennialTV; MACtv (streaming)	Franklin & Marshall; Delaware Valley*	Centennial; MAC	**Franklin & Marshall 7** Delaware Valley 0
Nov 23	Noon	Centennial-MAC; Bowl Series	Campus sites	CentennialTV; MACtv (streaming)	Dickinson; FDU–Florham*	Centennial; MAC	**FDU–Florham 49**; Dickinson 14
Nov 23	Noon	Whitelaw Bowl	Campus sites		Stevenson; Morrisville*	MAC; Empire 8	**Morrisville 21**; Stevenson 18
Nov 23	Noon	Chapman Bowl	Campus sites		Rochester; Brockport*	Liberty; Empire 8	**Brockport 42**; Rochester 23
Nov 23	Noon	Bushnell Bowl	Campus sites		Alfred; Western Connecticut*	Empire 8 MASCAC	**Western Connecticut 45**; Alfred 14
Nov 23	Noon	Lakefront Bowl	Raabe Stadium; Wauwatosa, Wisconsin		Monmouth (IL); St. Norbert	MWC; NACC	**St. Norbert 20**; Monmouth (IL) 14
Nov 23	1:00 pm	Fusion Bowl	Campus sites	Northeast Sports Network	Husson; Maritime*	CNE; NEWMAC	**Maritime 21**; Husson 14
Nov 23	1:00 pm	Cape Henry Bowl	Salem Football Stadium; Salem, Virginia	ODAC Sports Network (streaming)	Wilkes; Washington & Lee	Landmark; ODAC	**Washington & Lee 40**; Wilkes 21
Nov 23	5:00 pm	Cape Charles Bowl	Salem Football Stadium; Salem, Virginia	ODAC Sports Network (streaming)	Moravian; Shenandoah	Landmark; ODAC	**Moravian 35**; Shenandoah 14
Nov 23	3:00 pm	Isthmus Bowl	Bank of Sun Prairie Stadium; Sun Prairie, Wisconsin		Wisconsin–Stout; Wheaton (IL)	WIAC; CCIW	**Wheaton (IL) 35**; Wisconsin-Stout 32
Nov 23	1:00 pm	ForeverLawn Bowl	Tom Benson Hall of Fame Stadium; Canton, Ohio	FloSports	Hanover; Wabash	HCAC; NCAC	**Hanover 13**; Wabash 10
Nov 23	6:00 pm	Extra Points Bowl	Tom Benson Hall of Fame Stadium; Canton, Ohio	FloSports	Marietta; Westminster (PA)	OAC; PAC	**Westminster (PA) 27**; Marietta 13

* - Host team

=== All-star games ===
The FCS Bowl, an all-star contest with a focus players from the NCAA Division I Football Championship Subdivision (FCS), was played on December 8, 2024 in Daytona Beach, Florida. The American Team defeated the National Team 29–0.

Date	Time (EST)	Game	Site	Television	Participants	Results	Ref.
Jan 11	Noon	Hula Bowl	FBC Mortgage Stadium; Orlando, Florida (Note: The stadium has an Orlando mailing address, but is located in unincorporated Orange County.)	CBS Sports Network (Note: It was reported that the Hula Bowl did not air on CBS Sports Network as had been planned.)	Team Aina; Team Kai	**Aina 10**; Kai 3	
Jan 19	11:00 am	Tropical Bowl	Municipal Stadium; Daytona Beach, Florida	Varsity Sports Network	American Team; National Team	**American 17**; National 7	
Jan 30	8:00 pm	East–West Shrine Bowl	AT&T Stadium; Arlington, Texas	NFL Network	East Team; West Team	**East 25**; West 0	
Feb 1	2:30 pm	Senior Bowl	Hancock Whitney Stadium; Mobile, Alabama	NFL Network	American Team; National Team	**American 22**; National 19	
Feb 22	4:00 pm	HBCU Legacy Bowl	Yulman Stadium; New Orleans, Louisiana	NFL Network	Team Robinson; Team Gaither	**Robinson 17**; Gaither 14	

The East–West Shrine Bowl played its 100th edition.

The HBCU Legacy Bowl features players from historically black colleges and universities (HBCU). Most HBCU football programs compete in the Mid-Eastern Athletic Conference (MEAC) or the Southwestern Athletic Conference (SWAC), which are part of FCS.

== Team selections ==
=== CFP top 25 standings and bowl games ===
The College Football Playoff (CFP) selection committee announced its final team rankings for the season on December 8, 2024.

For the 2024–25 season, the playoffs were expanded from four teams to twelve teams. The top five ranked conference champions were selected to compete, along with the seven highest ranked remaining teams. The top four conference champions received a first-round bye.

Rank	Team	W–L	Conference and standing	Bowl game
1	Oregon Ducks	13–0	Big Ten champions	Rose Bowl (CFP quarterfinal)
2	Georgia Bulldogs	11–2	SEC champions	Sugar Bowl (CFP quarterfinal)
3	Texas Longhorns	11–2	SEC first place	CFP first-round game
4	Penn State Nittany Lions	11–2	Big Ten second place (tie)	CFP first-round game
5	Notre Dame Fighting Irish	11–1	Independent	CFP first-round game
6	Ohio State Buckeyes	10–2	Big Ten fourth place	CFP first-round game
7	Tennessee Volunteers	10–2	SEC second place (tie)	CFP first-round game
8	Indiana Hoosiers	11–1	Big Ten second place (tie)	CFP first-round game
9	Boise State Broncos	12–1	Mountain West champions	Fiesta Bowl (CFP quarterfinal)
10	SMU Mustangs	11–2	ACC first place	CFP first-round game
11	Alabama Crimson Tide	9–3	SEC fourth place (tie)	ReliaQuest Bowl
12	Arizona State Sun Devils	11–2	Big 12 champions	Peach Bowl (CFP quarterfinal)
13	Miami Hurricanes	10–2	ACC third place	Pop-Tarts Bowl
14	Ole Miss Rebels	9–3	SEC fourth place (tie)	Gator Bowl
15	South Carolina Gamecocks	9–3	SEC fourth place (tie)	Citrus Bowl
16	Clemson Tigers	10–3	ACC champions	CFP first-round game
17	BYU Cougars	10–2	Big 12 first place (tie)	Alamo Bowl
18	Iowa State Cyclones	10–3	Big 12 first place (tie)	Pop-Tarts Bowl
19	Missouri Tigers	9–3	SEC fourth place (tie)	Music City Bowl
20	Illinois Fighting Illini	9–3	Big Ten fifth place (tie)	Citrus Bowl
21	Syracuse Orange	9–3	ACC fourth place (tie)	Holiday Bowl
22	Army Black Knights	11–1	AAC champions	Independence Bowl
23	Colorado Buffaloes	9–3	Big 12 first place (tie)	Alamo Bowl
24	UNLV Rebels	10–3	Mountain West second place (tie)	LA Bowl
25	Memphis Tigers	10–2	AAC third place (tie)	Frisco Bowl

Unranked conference champions' bowl games
Rank	Team	W–L	Conference and standing	Bowl game
–	Jacksonville State Gamecocks	9–4	C-USA champions	Cure Bowl
–	Ohio Bobcats	10–3	MAC champions	Cure Bowl
–	Marshall Thundering Herd	10–3	Sun Belt champions	– (Note: Marshall withdrew from the Independence Bowl due to a large number of players entering the NCAA transfer portal.)
–	Oregon State Beavers	5–7	Pac-12 champions	–

=== Bowl eligibility ===
The below lists of teams are based on team records as published by the NCAA, and bowl eligibility criteria.

==== Bowl-eligible teams ====
- ACC (13): Boston College, California, Clemson, Duke, Georgia Tech, Louisville, Miami (FL), NC State, North Carolina, Pittsburgh, SMU, Syracuse, Virginia Tech
- American (8): Army, East Carolina, Memphis, Navy, North Texas, South Florida, Tulane, UTSA
- Big Ten (12): Illinois, Indiana, Iowa, Michigan, Minnesota, Nebraska, Ohio State, Oregon, Penn State, Rutgers, USC, Washington
- Big 12 (9): Arizona State, Baylor, BYU, Colorado, Iowa State, Kansas State, TCU, Texas Tech, West Virginia
- CUSA (4): Jacksonville State, Liberty, Sam Houston, Western Kentucky
- MAC (7): Bowling Green, Buffalo, Miami (OH), Northern Illinois, Ohio, Toledo, Western Michigan
- Mountain West (5): Boise State, Colorado State, Fresno State, San Jose State, UNLV
- Pac-12 (1): Washington State
- SEC (13): Alabama, Arkansas, Florida, Georgia, LSU, Missouri, Oklahoma, Ole Miss, South Carolina, Tennessee, Texas, Texas A&M, Vanderbilt
- Sun Belt (8): Arkansas State, Coastal Carolina, Georgia Southern, James Madison, Louisiana, Marshall, South Alabama, Texas State
- Independent (2): Notre Dame, UConn

Number of postseason berths available: 82 (Note: There were 35 traditional season-ending bowl games providing berths for 70 teams. The CFP placed 12 teams into a bracket tournament (8 teams in first-round games, and 4 teams directly into quarterfinal games). Thus, a total of 82 teams (70 + 12) fulfilled these postseason competitions.)
Number of bowl-eligible teams: 82
Note: Although the Sun Belt had eight bowl-eligible teams, Marshall (10–3) withdrew from the Independence Bowl and was subsequently replaced by Louisiana Tech (5–7) of Conference USA. Thus, the resulting bowl count for the Sun Belt was seven, and for Conference USA was five.

==== Bowl-ineligible teams ====
- ACC (4): Florida State, Stanford, Virginia, Wake Forest
- American (6): Charlotte, Florida Atlantic, Rice, Temple, Tulsa, UAB
- Big Ten (6): Maryland, Michigan State, Northwestern, Purdue, UCLA, Wisconsin
- Big 12 (7): Arizona, Cincinnati, Houston, Kansas, Oklahoma State, UCF, Utah
- CUSA (6): FIU, Kennesaw State, (Note: Kennesaw State was bowl ineligible due to their transition from FCS to FBS; having posted a losing record, the Owls were bowl ineligible regardless.) Louisiana Tech, (Note: Louisiana Tech was named as a participant in the Independence Bowl following the withdrawal of Marshall.) Middle Tennessee, New Mexico State, UTEP
- MAC (5): Akron, Ball State, Central Michigan, Eastern Michigan, Kent State
- Mountain West (7): Air Force, Hawaii, (Note: Hawaii had two wins against FCS teams, Delaware State and Northern Iowa. Only one win against an FCS school may be counted towards bowl eligibility. However, with a losing record, the Rainbow Warriors were bowl ineligible regardless.) Nevada, New Mexico, San Diego State, Utah State, Wyoming
- Pac-12 (1): Oregon State
- SEC (3): Auburn, Kentucky, Mississippi State
- Sun Belt (6): Appalachian State, Georgia State, Louisiana–Monroe, Old Dominion, Southern Miss, Troy
- Independent (1): UMass (Note: UMass had two wins against FCS teams, Central Connecticut and Wagner. Only one win against an FCS school may be counted towards bowl eligibility. However, with a losing record, the Minutemen were bowl ineligible regardless.)

Number of bowl-ineligible teams: 52

== Conference performance in bowl games ==
CFP bowl games are denoted in bold type. First-round CFP playoff games are included, and denoted as CFP1.

Conference	Games			Record	Win%	Bowls	
Conference	CFP	Other	Total	Record	Win%	Won	Lost
ACC	2	11	13	2–11	.154	Holiday, Sun	**CFP1** × 2, Birmingham, Duke's Mayo, Fenway, GameAbove Sports, Gator, LA, Military, Pinstripe, Pop-Tarts
American	0	8	8	6–2	.750	Armed Forces, Frisco, Hawaii, Independence, Military, Myrtle Beach	First Responder, Gasparilla
Big 12	1	8	9	4–5	.444	Alamo, New Mexico, Pop-Tarts, Rate	Alamo, Frisco, Liberty, **Peach**, Texas
Big Ten	8	9	17	11–6	.647	**CFP1** × 2, **Cotton**, Duke's Mayo, **Fiesta**, Las Vegas, Pinstripe, ReliaQuest, **Rose**, Citrus, **National Championship**	**CFP1**, Music City, **Orange**, Rate, **Rose**, Sun
CUSA	0	5	5	1–4	.200	New Orleans	Bahamas, Boca Raton, Cure, Independence
MAC	0	7	7	5–2	.714	Arizona, Bahamas, Cure, Famous Idaho Potato, GameAbove Sports	68 Ventures, Salute to Veterans
Mountain West	1	4	5	1–4	.200	LA	Arizona, Famous Idaho Potato, **Fiesta**, Hawaii
Pac-12	0	1	1	0–1	.000	—N/a	Holiday
SEC	5	10	15	8–7	.533	**CFP1**, Birmingham, Gasparilla, Gator, Liberty, Music City, **Peach**, Texas	**CFP1**, Armed Forces, Citrus, **Cotton**, Las Vegas, ReliaQuest, **Sugar**
Sun Belt	0	7	7	4–3	.571	68 Ventures, Boca Raton, First Responder, Salute to Veterans	Myrtle Beach, New Mexico, New Orleans
Independent	4	1	5	4–1	.800	**CFP1**, Fenway, **Orange**, **Sugar**	**National Championship**

Note: The Alamo Bowl was contested by two Big 12 teams (one was selected as a former Pac-12 member), while the Rose Bowl was contested by two Big Ten teams.
