= 2024 Armed Forces Bowl =

Postseason college football bowl game

2024 Lockheed Martin Armed Forces Bowl
- 22nd Armed Forces Bowl
Oklahoma Sooners	Navy Midshipmen
(6–6)	(9–3)
SEC	The American
20	21
Head coach: Brent Venables	Head coach: Brian Newberry
	1	2	3	4	Total
Oklahoma	14	0	0	6	20
Navy	0	7	7	7	21
- Date: December 27, 2024
- Season: 2024
- Stadium: Amon G. Carter Stadium
- Location: Fort Worth, Texas
- MVP: Blake Horvath (QB, Navy)
- Favorite: Oklahoma by 2.5
- National anthem: Krystal Keith
- Referee: Mike McCabe (Big 12)
- Attendance: 50,754

United States TV coverage
- Network: ESPN
- Announcers: Courtney Lyle (play-by-play), Rene Ingoglia (analyst), and Morgan Uber (sideline)

The 2024 Armed Forces Bowl was a college football bowl game played on December 27, 2024, at Amon G. Carter Stadium located in Fort Worth, Texas. The 22nd annual Armed Forces Bowl featured Oklahoma and Navy. The game began at approximately 11:00 a.m. CST and aired on ESPN. The Armed Forces Bowl was one of the 2024–25 bowl games concluding the 2024 FBS football season. The game was officially named the Lockheed Martin Armed Forces Bowl after its corporate sponsor Lockheed Martin.

== Teams ==
Consistent with conference tie-ins, the game featured Navy from the American Athletic Conference (The American) and Oklahoma from the Southeastern Conference (SEC). The teams had met once previously, with Navy winning a regular-season matchup in Oklahoma in 1965.

=== Oklahoma Sooners ===
Oklahoma compiled a 6–6 overall record (2–6 in SEC play) during the regular season. They began with four wins in their first five games and were ranked as high as 15th. They finished the season with five losses in seven games. The Sooners faced five ranked teams, defeating Alabama while losing to Tennessee, Texas, Ole Miss, and Missouri.

=== Navy Midshipmen ===
Navy registered a regular-season record of 9–3 (6–2 in The American). They won their first six games and were ranked as high as 24th. They then lost three of their next four games, before finishing the season with back-to-back wins, including an upset win in the Army–Navy Game. The Midshipmen faced three ranked teams, defeating Army while losing to Notre Dame and Tulane.

== Game summary ==
2024 Lockheed Martin Armed Forces Bowl

Quarter	1	2	3	4	Total
Oklahoma	14	0	0	6	20
Navy	0	7	7	7	21

at Amon G. Carter Stadium • Fort Worth, Texas

- Date: Friday, December 27, 2024
- Game time: 11:05 a.m. CST
- Game weather: Sunny • Temperature: 58 °F (14 °C) • Wind: 13 mph (21 km/h) south
- Game attendance: 50,754
- Referee: Mike McCabe
- TV announcers (ESPN): Courtney Lyle (play-by-play), Rene Ingoglia (analyst), and Morgan Uber (sideline)
- Box score

Game information

First Quarter

- (11:33) OU – Gavin Sawchuk 21 yard run, Zach Schmit kick (Drive: 9 plays, 65 yards, 3:27; Oklahoma 7–0)
- (5:56) OU – Zion Kearney 56 yard pass from Michael Hawkins, Zach Schmit kick (Drive: 6 plays, 85 yards, 1:43; Oklahoma 14–0)

Second Quarter

- (3:40) NAVY – Alex Tecza 11 yard run, Nathan Kirkwood kick (Drive: 6 plays, 45 yards, 3:36; Oklahoma 14–7)

Third Quarter

- (3:49) NAVY – Blake Horvath 95 yard run, Nathan Kirkwood kick (Drive: 2 plays, 96 yards, 1:12; Tie 14–14)

Fourth Quarter

- (4:34) NAVY – Blake Horvath 6 yard run, Nathan Kirkwood kick (Drive: 12 plays, 66 yards, 7:32; Navy 21–14)
- (0:06) OU – Jake Roberts 10 yard pass from Michael Hawkins, two-point conversion failed (Drive: 13 plays, 65 yards, 1:41; Navy 21–20)

=== Statistics ===
Statistics	OU	NAVY
First downs	26	11
Plays–yards	84–433	53–318
Rushes–yards	40–158	39–227
Passing yards	275	92
Passing: comp–att–int	29–44–0	7–13–0
Time of possession	29:50	30:04

Team	Category	Player	Statistics
Oklahoma	Passing	Michael Hawkins Jr.	28/43, 247 yards, 2 TD
Oklahoma	Rushing	Gavin Sawchuk	13 carries, 67 yards, TD
Oklahoma	Receiving	Ivan Carreon	7 receptions, 72 yards
Navy	Passing	Blake Horvath	7/12, 92 yards
Navy	Rushing	Blake Horvath	18 carries, 155 yards, 2 TD
Navy	Receiving	Nathan Kent	1 reception, 32 yards
