= 2024 Hawaii Bowl =

Postseason college football bowl game

- 21st Hawaii Bowl
South Florida Bulls	San Jose State Spartans
(6–6)	(7–5)
The American	MW
41	39
Head coach: Alex Golesh	Head coach: Ken Niumatalolo
	1	2	3	4	OT	2OT	3OT	4OT	5OT	Total
South Florida	7	14	0	6	7	3	2	0	2	41
San Jose State	0	10	10	7	7	3	2	0	0	39
- Date: December 24, 2024
- Season: 2024
- Stadium: Clarence T. C. Ching Athletics Complex
- Location: Honolulu, Hawaii
- MVP: John Cannon (K, South Florida)
- Favorite: South Florida by 1
- Referee: Timothy Barker (Sun Belt)
- Attendance: 6,720

United States TV coverage
- Network: ESPN; ESPN Radio
- Announcers: Tiffany Greene (play-by-play), Jay Walker (analyst), and Marilyn Payne (sideline) (ESPN); Kevin Winter (play-by-play) and Trevor Matich (analyst) (ESPN Radio)

The 2024 Hawaii Bowl was a college football bowl game played on December 24, 2024, at Clarence T. C. Ching Athletics Complex located in Honolulu, Hawaii. The 21st annual Hawaii Bowl game featured South Florida and San Jose State. The game began at approximately 3:00 p.m. HST (8:00 p.m. EST) and aired on ESPN. The Hawaii Bowl was one of the 2024–25 bowl games concluding the 2024 FBS football season.

The game took five overtime periods to decide, which at the time set a new record for the most overtime periods in a Football Bowl Subdivision (FBS) bowl game. However, this record was surpassed just two days later when the 2024 GameAbove Sports Bowl took six overtimes to decide.

== Teams ==
Consistent with conference tie-ins, the game featured South Florida from the American Athletic Conference (The American) and San Jose State from the Mountain West Conference (MW). South Florida and San Jose State had played once before, in 2017, which South Florida won, 42–22. The game was San Jose State's second appearance in the Hawaii Bowl, and South Florida's first.

=== South Florida Bulls ===
The Bulls started their season with a win over Bethune–Cookman, but fell the following week to eighth-ranked Alabama. South Florida had a three-game losing streak in the middle of the season, but were able to recover in the latter half of the year, clinching bowl eligibility on November 23 after beating Tulsa, 63–30, at home. The Bulls ended their regular season with a loss to Rice, which brought their regular season record to 6–6.

=== San Jose State Spartans ===
The Spartans started their season with three consecutive wins before losing to Washington State in double-overtime. They then alternated winning and losing games before clinching bowl eligibility on November 9 by beating Oregon State, 24–13. San Jose State ended the regular season with a 34–31 win against Stanford in the Bill Walsh Legacy Game to bring their record to 7–5.

== Game summary ==
2024 Hawaii Bowl

Quarter	1	2	3	4	OT	2OT	3OT	4OT	5OT	Total
South Florida	7	14	0	6	7	3	2	0	2	41
San Jose State	0	10	10	7	7	3	2	0	0	39

at Clarence T. C. Ching Athletics Complex • Honolulu, Hawaii

- Date: Tuesday, December 24, 2024
- Game time: 3:06 p.m. HST
- Game weather: Sunny • Temperature: 83 °F (28 °C) • Wind: 14 mph (23 km/h) northeast
- Game attendance: 6,720
- Referee: Tim Barker
- TV announcers (ESPN): Tiffany Greene (play-by-play), Jay Walker (analyst), and Marilyn Payne (sideline)
- Box score

Game information

First Quarter

- (0:45) USF – Kelley Joiner 4 yard run, John Cannon kick (Drive: 5 plays, 16 yards, 1:32; South Florida 7–0)

Second Quarter

- (6:53) USF – Nay'Quan Wright 3 yard run, John Cannon kick (Drive: 13 plays, 80 yards, 5:31; South Florida 14–0)
- (2:09) SJSU – Floyd Chalk IV 3 yard run, Kyler Halvorsen kick (Drive: 9 plays, 70 yards, 4:37; South Florida 14–7)
- (1:53) USF – Ta'Ron Keith 93 yard kickoff return, John Cannon kick (Drive: 9 plays, 70 yards, 4:37; South Florida 21–7)
- (0:00) SJSU – Kyler Halvorsen 42 yard field goal (Drive: 11 plays, 51 yards, 1:53; South Florida 21–10)

Third Quarter

- (9:05) SJSU – Kyler Halvorsen 22 yard field goal (Drive: 11 plays, 77 yards, 5:12; South Florida 21–13)
- (3:41) SJSU – Jackson Canaan 5 yard pass from Walker Eget, Kyler Halvorsen kick (Drive: 6 plays, 85 yards, 3:21; South Florida 21–20)

Fourth Quarter

- (13:00) USF – John Cannon 33 yard field goal (Drive: 15 plays, 60 yards, 5:41; South Florida 24–20)
- (11:14) SJSU – Lamar Radcliffe 2 yard run, Kyler Halvorsen kick (Drive: 1 plays, 2 yards, 0:04; San Jose State 27–24)
- (0:02) USF – John Cannon 41 yard field goal (Drive: 7 plays, 27 yards, 0:41; Tied 27–27)

Overtime

- USF – Ta'Ron Keith 2 yard run, John Cannon kick (Drive: 2 plays, 25 yards; South Florida 32–27)
- SJSU – Matthew Coleman 4 yard pass from Walker Eget, Kyler Halvorsen kick (Drive: 11 plays, 25 yards; Tied 34–34)

Second Overtime

- SJSU – Kyler Halvorsen 24 yard field goal (Drive: 5 plays, 18 yards; San Jose State 37–34)
- USF – John Cannon 36 yard field goal (Drive: 4 plays, 7 yards; Tied 37–37)

Third Overtime

- USF – Bryce Archie pass to Payten Singletary for 2-Point Conversion (Drive: 1 plays, 0 yards; South Florida 39–37)
- SJSU – Walker Eget Pass to Matthew Coleman for 2-Point Conversion (Drive: 1 plays, 0 yards; Tied 39–39)

Fourth Overtime

- No scoring

Fifth Overtime

- USF – Bryce Archie pass to Keshaun Singleton for 2-Point Conversion (Drive: 1 plays, 0 yards; South Florida 41–39)

=== Statistics ===
Statistics	USF	SJSU
First downs	15	29
Plays–yards	70–291	94–441
Rushes–yards	34–56	38–161
Passing yards	235	280
Passing: comp–att–int	24–36–1	33–58–1
Time of possession	25:17	34:43

Team	Category	Player	Statistics
South Florida	Passing	Bryce Archie	24/35, 235 yards, 1 INT
South Florida	Rushing	Kelley Joiner	11 carries, 33 yards, 1 TD
South Florida	Receiving	Sean Atkins	11 receptions, 104 yards
San Jose State	Passing	Walker Eget	33/58, 280 yards, 2 TD, 1 INT
San Jose State	Rushing	Lamar Radcliffe	15 carries, 65 yards, 1 TD
San Jose State	Receiving	Matthew Coleman	12 receptions, 119 yards, 1 TD
