= 2024 GameAbove Sports Bowl =

Postseason college football bowl game

- 10th GameAbove Sports Bowl
Pittsburgh Panthers	Toledo Rockets
(7–5)	(7–5)
ACC	MAC
46	48
Head coach: Pat Narduzzi	Head coach: Jason Candle
	1	2	3	4	OT	2OT	3OT	4OT	5OT	6OT	Total
Pittsburgh	2	10	11	7	7	3	2	2	2	0	46
Toledo	6	14	0	10	7	3	2	2	2	2	48
- Date: December 26, 2024
- Season: 2024
- Stadium: Ford Field
- Location: Detroit, Michigan
- MVP: Junior Vandeross III (WR, Toledo)
- Favorite: Pittsburgh by 6.5
- Referee: Ron Hudson (CUSA)
- Attendance: 26,219

United States TV coverage
- Network: ESPN
- Announcers: Matt Schumacker (play-by-play), Dustin Fox (analyst), and Harry Lyles Jr. (sideline)

The 2024 GameAbove Sports Bowl was a college football bowl game played on December 26, 2024, at Ford Field in Detroit, Michigan. The 10th annual GameAbove Sports Bowl game (though only the first under the name; prior editions were known as the Quick Lane Bowl) featured Pittsburgh and Toledo. The game began at approximately 2:00 p.m. EST and aired on ESPN. The game was one of the 2024–25 bowl games concluding the 2024 FBS football season.

The game took six overtime periods to decide, setting the record for the most overtime periods in a Football Bowl Subdivision (FBS) bowl game, a record that had previously been set just two days prior when the 2024 Hawaii Bowl took five overtimes to decide. Lasting for four hours and thirty-nine minutes, it was the longest bowl game in history.

== Teams ==
Based on conference tie-ins, the game was expected to feature teams from the Big Ten Conference and the Mid-American Conference (MAC). There was no Big Ten team available to play so it became an at-large bid and that let an Atlantic Coast Conference (ACC) team participate in the game. This was the fourth time Pittsburgh and Toledo faced each other. In their prior meetings, all during regular-season play, Pittsburgh won in 2002 and 2006, while Toledo won in 2003.

=== Pittsburgh Panthers ===
Pittsburgh entered the game with a 7–5 record (3–5 in the ACC), having finished in 10th place in their conference. After winning their first seven games and being ranked as high as 18th, the Panthers finished their regular season with five consecutive losses. This was the Panthers' second appearance in a GameAbove Sports Bowl, the prior being a victory in the 2019 Quick Lane Bowl when the bowl was played under a different name. They also made one appearance in the Detroit-based defunct Little Caesars Pizza Bowl, winning the 2013 edition.

=== Toledo Rockets ===
Toledo entered the game with a 7–5 record (4–4 in the MAC), having finished in seventh place in their conference. The Rockets started their regular season with three consecutive wins, went 4–3 in their middle seven games, then finished with back-to-back losses. This was Toledo's first GameAbove Sports Bowl. They played in four editions of the defunct Little Caesars Pizza Bowl (three when it was known as the Motor City Bowl), posting a 1–3 record.

== Game summary ==
2024 GameAbove Sports Bowl

Quarter	1	2	3	4	OT	2OT	3OT	4OT	5OT	6OT	Total
Pittsburgh	2	10	11	7	7	3	2	2	2	0	46
Toledo	6	14	0	10	7	3	2	2	2	2	48

at Ford Field • Detroit, Michigan

- Date: Thursday, December 26, 2024
- Game time: 2:04 p.m. EST
- Game weather: Indoor
- Game attendance: 26,219
- Referee: Ron Hudson
- TV announcers (ESPN): Matt Schumacker (play-by-play), Dustin Fox (analyst), and Harry Lyles Jr. (sideline)
- Box score

Game information

First Quarter

- (11:42) UT – Anthony Torres 2 yard pass from Tucker Gleason, PAT kick blocked (Drive: 8 plays, 75 yards, 3:18; Toledo 6–0)
- (11:42) PITT – Kyle Lewis defensive PAT conversion (Drive: 8 plays, 75 yards, 3:18; Toledo 6–2)

Second Quarter

- (14:56) PITT – Desmond Reid 3 yard run, Ben Sauls kick (Drive: 11 plays, 79 yards, 4:35; Pittsburgh 9–6)
- (11:12) PITT – Ben Sauls 57 yard field goal (Drive: 7 plays, 31 yards, 2:51; Pittsburgh 12–6)
- (7:38) UT – Junior Vandeross III 67 yard pass from Tucker Gleason, Dylan Cunanan kick (Drive: 4 plays, 93 yards, 1:06; Toledo 13–12)
- (7:24) UT – Braden Awls 42 yard interception return, Dylan Cunanan kick (Drive: 1 plays, 0 yards, 0:14; Toledo 20-12)

Third Quarter

- (6:55) PITT – Jake Overman 11 yard pass from Julian Dugger, David Lynch pass to Gavin Bartholomew for 2-Point Conversion (Drive: 10 plays, 71 yards, 3:47; Tie 20–20)
- (3:23) PITT – Ben Sauls 37 yard field goal (Drive: 7 plays, 37 yards, 3:18; Pittsburgh 23–20)

Fourth Quarter

- (13:11) PITT – Raphael Williams Jr. 16 yard pass from Julian Dugger, Ben Sauls kick (Drive: 6 plays, 34 yards, 3:04; Pittsburgh 30–20)
- (7:49) UT – Darius Alexander 58 yard interception return, Dylan Cunanan kick (Drive: 7 plays, 32 yards, 3:33; Pittsburgh 30–27)
- (1:45) UT – Dylan Cunanan 51 yard field goal (Drive: 10 plays, 47 yards, 2:54; Tie 30–30)

Overtime

- PITT – Julian Dugger 2 yard run, Ben Sauls kick (Drive: 6 plays, 25 yards; Pittsburgh 37–30)
- UT – Tucker Gleason 1 yard run, Dylan Cunanan kick (Drive: 8 plays, 25 yards; Tie 37–37)

Second Overtime

- UT – Dylan Cunanan 33 yard field goal (Drive: 6 plays, 10 yards; Toledo 40–37)
- PITT – Ben Sauls 19 yard field goal (Drive: 8 plays, 24 yards; Tie 40-40)

Third Overtime

- PITT – Julian Dugger pass to Kenny Johnson for 2-Point Conversion (Pittsburgh 42–40)
- UT – Tucker Gleason Pass to Terrell Crosby Jr. for 2-Point Conversion (Tie 42–42)

Fourth Overtime

- UT – Tucker Gleason Pass to Anthony Torres for 2-Point Conversion (Toledo 44–42)
- PITT – Julian Dugger run for 2-Point Conversion (Tie 44–44)

Fifth Overtime

- PITT – Julian Dugger pass to Gavin Bartholomew for 2-Point Conversion (Pittsburgh 46–44)
- UT – Tucker Gleason Pass to Jerjuan Newton for 2-Point Conversion (Tie 46–46)

Sixth Overtime

- UT – Tucker Gleason Pass to Junior Vandeross III for 2-Point Conversion (Toledo 48–46)

=== Statistics ===
Statistics	PITT	UT
First downs	29	18
Plays–yards	98–438	75–416
Rushes–yards	66–301	25–80
Passing yards	137	336
Passing: comp–att–int	17–32–3	26–50–1
Time of possession	36:12	23:48

Team	Category	Player	Statistics
Pittsburgh	Passing	Julian Dugger	7/13, 72 yards, 2 TD, 1 INT
Pittsburgh	Rushing	Desmond Reid	33 carries, 169 yards, 1 TD
Pittsburgh	Receiving	Raphael Williams Jr.	3 receptions, 36 yards, 1 TD
Toledo	Passing	Tucker Gleason	26/50, 336 yards, 2 TD, 1 INT
Toledo	Rushing	Jacquez Stuart	7 carries, 39 yards
Toledo	Receiving	Junior Vandeross III	12 receptions, 194 yards, 1 TD
