= 2025 Gator Bowl (January) =

Postseason college football bowl game

2025 TaxSlayer Gator Bowl
- 80th Gator Bowl
Duke Blue Devils	Ole Miss Rebels
(9–3)	(9–3)
ACC	SEC
20	52
Head coach: Manny Diaz	Head coach: Lane Kiffin
	AP / Coaches / CFP; 16 / 15 / 14
	1	2	3	4	Total
Duke	0	7	0	13	20
Ole Miss	14	10	14	14	52
- Date: January 2, 2025
- Season: 2024
- Stadium: EverBank Stadium
- Location: Jacksonville, Florida
- MVP: Jaxson Dart (QB, Ole Miss)
- Favorite: Ole Miss by 14.5
- National anthem: Marvin Zapf
- Referee: Jeffrey Servinski (Big Ten)
- Attendance: 31,290

United States TV coverage
- Network: ESPN
- Announcers: Dave Pasch (play-by-play), Dusty Dvoracek (analyst), and Taylor McGregor (sideline)

The 2025 Gator Bowl was a college football bowl game played on January 2, 2025, at EverBank Stadium located in Jacksonville, Florida. The 80th annual Gator Bowl featured Duke from the Atlantic Coast Conference (ACC) and Ole Miss from the Southeastern Conference (SEC). The game began at approximately 8:00 p.m. EST and aired on ESPN. The Gator Bowl was one of the 2024–25 bowl games concluding the 2024 FBS football season. The game was sponsored by financial technology company TaxSlayer and was officially known as the TaxSlayer Gator Bowl.

== Teams ==
Consistent with conference tie-ins, the game featured Duke from the Atlantic Coast Conference (ACC) and Ole Miss from the Southeastern Conference (SEC). This was the first meeting between the programs.

=== Duke Blue Devils ===
Duke compiled 9–3 regular-season record (5–3 in ACC play). After starting the season with five consecutive wins, the Blue Devils lost three of their next four games, then concluded their schedule with three wins. Duke faced two ranked teams, losing to SMU and Miami (FL).

=== Ole Miss Rebels ===
Ole Miss finished their regular season with a 9–3 record (5–3 in SEC play). The Rebels were nationally ranked throughout the season, as high as fifth after starting with four consecutive wins. Ole Miss faced two ranked FBS teams, losing to LSU while defeating Georgia. Ole Miss was placed 14th in the final College Football Playoff (CFP) rankings.

== Game summary ==
2025 TaxSlayer Gator Bowl

Quarter	1	2	3	4	Total
Duke	0	7	0	13	20
No. 14 Ole Miss	14	10	14	14	52

at EverBank Stadium • Jacksonville, Florida

- Date: Thursday, January 2, 2025
- Game time: 8:06 p.m. EST
- Game weather: Clear • Temperature: 50 °F (10 °C) • Wind: 3 mph (4.8 km/h) northeast
- Game attendance: 31,290
- Referee: Jeffrey Servinski
- TV announcers (ESPN): Dave Pasch (play-by-play), Dusty Dvoracek (analyst), and Taylor McGregor (sideline)
- Box score

Game information
First quarter
- (8:07) Ole Miss – Antwane Wells Jr. 39 yard pass from Jaxson Dart, Caden Davis kick, (Drive: 4 plays, 68 yards, 1:05; Ole Miss 7–0)
- (2:29) Ole Miss – Ulysses Bentley IV 1 yard run, Caden Davis kick, (Drive: 4 plays, 68 yards, 1:05; Ole Miss 14–0)

Second quarter

- (9:43) Ole Miss – Caden Davis 28 yard field goal, (Drive: 12 plays, 61 yards, 5:06; Ole Miss 17–0)
- (5:54) Duke – Javon Harvey 16 yard pass from Henry Belin IV, Todd Pelino kick, (Drive: 8 plays, 75 yards, 3:49; Ole Miss 17–7)
- (1:52) Ole Miss – Dae'Quan Wright 21 yard pass from Jaxson Dart, Caden Davis kick, (Drive: 10 plays, 75 yards, 4:02; Ole Miss 24–7)

Third quarter

- (8:18) Ole Miss – Isaiah Hamilton 50 interception return, Caden Davis kick, (Drive: 7 plays, 15 yards, 3:52; Ole Miss 31–7)
- (1:20) Ole Miss – Ulysses Bentley IV 8 yard run, Caden Davis kick, (Drive: 4 plays, 74 yards, 2:02; Ole Miss 38–7)

Fourth quarter

- (9:56) Ole Miss – Jordan Watkins 1 yard pass from Jaxson Dart, Caden Davis kick, (Drive: 4 plays, 38 yards, 1:41; Ole Miss 45–7)
- (3:43) Duke – Jordan Moore 20 yard pass from Henry Belin IV, Todd Pelino kick, (Drive: 11 plays, 75 yards, 6:13; Ole Miss 45–14)
- (1:27) Ole Miss – Jordan Watkins 69 yard pass from Jaxson Dart, Mike Baker kick, (Drive: 4 plays, 75 yards, 2:16; Ole Miss 52–14)
- (1:07) Duke – Sahmir Hagans 69 yard kickoff return, Todd Pelino PAT failed, (Drive: 0 plays, 0 yards, 0:20; Ole Miss 52–20)

=== Statistics ===
Statistics	DUKE	MISS
First downs	17	27
Plays–yards	68–280	70–589
Rushes–yards	23–44	33–151
Passing yards	236	438
Passing: comp–att–int	25–45–1	28–37–1
Time of possession	30:02	29:58

Team	Category	Player	Statistics
Duke	Passing	Henry Belin IV	25/44, 236 yards, 2 TD, INT
Duke	Rushing	Peyton Jones	8 carries, 18 yards
Duke	Receiving	Jordan Moore	5 receptions, 63 yards, TD
Ole Miss	Passing	Jaxson Dart	27/35, 404 yards, 4 TD
Ole Miss	Rushing	Ulysses Bentley IV	14 carries, 70 yards, 2 TD
Ole Miss	Receiving	Jordan Watkins	7 receptions, 180 yards, 2 TD
