= 2024 South Florida Bulls football team =

American college football season

2024 South Florida Bulls football

Hawaii Bowl champion

Hawaii Bowl, W 41–39 ^{5OT} vs. San Jose State
- Conference: American Athletic Conference
- Record: 7–6 (4–4 AAC)
- Head coach: Alex Golesh (2nd season)
- Offensive coordinator: Joel Gordon (2nd season)
- Offensive scheme: Veer and shoot
- Defensive coordinator: Todd Orlando (2nd season)
- Base defense: Multiple 3–3–5
- Home stadium: Raymond James Stadium

2024 American Athletic Conference football standings
	Conf.			Overall
Team	W		L	W		L
No. 21 Army y$	8	–	0	12	–	2
Tulane y	7	–	1	9	–	5
Navy	6	–	2	10	–	3
No. 24 Memphis	6	–	2	11	–	2
East Carolina	5	–	3	8	–	5
South Florida	4	–	4	7	–	6
UTSA	4	–	4	7	–	6
Charlotte	4	–	4	5	–	7
North Texas	3	–	5	6	–	7
Rice	3	–	5	4	–	8
Temple	2	–	6	3	–	9
UAB	2	–	6	3	–	9
Florida Atlantic	1	–	7	3	–	9
Tulsa	1	–	7	3	–	9
Championship: Army 35, Tulane 14
$ – Conference champion; y – Championship game participant; Rankings from AP Poll

The 2024 South Florida Bulls football team represented the University of South Florida (USF) in the American Athletic Conference (AAC) during the 2024 NCAA Division I FBS football season. The Bulls were led by Alex Golesh in his second year as the head coach. The Bulls played home games at Raymond James Stadium, located in Tampa, Florida.

== Preseason ==
=== Coaching changes ===
Additions
FIU cornerbacks coach DeMarcus Van Dyke was hired to be the cornerbacks coach.

Tennessee offensive analyst Micah James was hired to be the running backs coach.

Albany tight ends coach De'Vonte Danzey was hired to be a quality control analyst working with the offensive line.

West Alabama defensive line coach Larry Scott III was hired to be a quality control analyst working with the defensive line.

Departures
Associate head coach, run game coordinator, and running backs coach Matt Merritt was hired as the running backs coach for Miami (FL).

Cornerbacks coach Matt Birkett was fired.

Tight ends coach Clay Patterson was hired as the co-offensive coordinator and wide receivers coach for Kent State.

Promotions
Offensive line coach Tyler Hudanick was promoted to run game coordinator and offensive line coach.

Wide receivers coach L'Damian Washington was promoted to pass game coordinator and wide receivers coach.

Senior offensive quality control analyst Jack Taylor was promoted to tight ends coach.

=== Other ===
On June 23, 2024, redshirt sophomore tight end Teigan Martin died in a single-car accident while visiting his family in Carver County, Minnesota.

== Schedule ==
Date	Time	Opponent	Site	TV	Result	Attendance
August 31	7:00 p.m.	Bethune–Cookman*	Raymond James Stadium; Tampa, FL	ESPN+	W 48–3	36,694
September 7	7:00 p.m.	at No. 4 Alabama*	Bryant–Denny Stadium; Tuscaloosa, AL	ESPN	L 16–42	100,077
September 14	7:00 p.m.	at Southern Miss*	M. M. Roberts Stadium; Hattiesburg, MS	ESPN+	W 49–24	23,537
September 21	7:00 p.m.	No. 8 Miami (FL)*	Raymond James Stadium; Tampa, FL	ESPN	L 15–50	58,616
September 28	12:00 p.m.	at Tulane	Yulman Stadium; New Orleans, LA	ESPNU	L 10–45	20,783
October 12	3:30 p.m.	Memphis	Camping World Stadium; Orlando, FL	ESPN+	L 3–21	3,365
October 19	3:30 p.m.	UAB^{†}	Raymond James Stadium; Tampa, FL	ESPN+	W 35–25	28,154
November 1	7:30 p.m.	at Florida Atlantic	FAU Stadium; Boca Raton, FL (rivalry)	ESPN2	W 44–21	20,111
November 9	12:00 p.m.	Navy	Raymond James Stadium; Tampa, FL	ESPN2	L 7–28	34,091
November 16	3:30 p.m.	at Charlotte	Jerry Richardson Stadium; Charlotte, NC	ESPN+	W 59–24	15,030
November 23	3:30 p.m.	Tulsa	Raymond James Stadium; Tampa, FL	ESPN+	W 63–30	27,623
November 30	2:00 p.m.	at Rice	Rice Stadium; Houston, TX	ESPN+	L 28–35	16,430
December 24	8:00 p.m.	vs. San Jose State*	Clarence T. C. Ching Athletics Complex; Honolulu, HI (Hawaii Bowl)	ESPN	W 41–39 ^{5OT}	6,720
*Non-conference game; ^{†}Homecoming; Rankings from AP Poll - Released prior to game; All times are in Eastern time

== Game summaries ==
=== Bethune–Cookman (FCS) ===
Bethune–Cookman Wildcats (FCS) (0–0) at South Florida Bulls (0–0) – Game summary

Quarter	1	2	3	4	Total
Wildcats (FCS)	0	3	0	0	3
Bulls	14	17	17	0	48

at Raymond James Stadium • Tampa, Florida

- Date: August 31st
- Game time: 7:00 p.m. EDT
- Game weather: Sunny • Temperature: 86 °F (30 °C) • Wind: NE at 5 miles per hour (8.0 km/h)
- Game attendance: 36,694
- Referee: James Jones
- TV announcers (ESPN+): AJ Ricketts (play-by-play) and Patrick Murray (analyst)

Game information

First quarter

- (6:21) USF – Byrum Brown 42-yard run, John Cannon kick (Drive: 11 plays, 82 yards, 2:50; South Florida 7–0)
- (3:59) USF – Kelley Joiner 2-yard run, John Cannon kick (Drive: 3 plays, 6 yards, 0:39; South Florida 14–0)

Second quarter

- (14:36) USF – Ta'Ron Keith 1-yard run, John Cannon kick (Drive: 8 plays, 48 yards, 2:53; South Florida 21–0)
- (4:39) USF – Nay'Quan Wright 1-yard run, John Cannon kick (Drive: 7 plays, 40 yards, 1:36; South Florida 28–0)
- (0:22) BCU – Cade Hechter 48-yard field goal (Drive: 12 plays, 44 yards, 4:17; South Florida 28–3)
- (0:00) USF – John Cannon 53-yard field goal (Drive: 3 plays, 29 yards, 0:19; South Florida 31–3)

Third quarter

- (10:00) USF – John Cannon 40-yard field goal (Drive: 7 plays, 40 yards, 2:43; South Florida 34–3)
- (5:00) USF – Kelley Joiner 4-yard run, Nico Gramatica kick (Drive: 5 plays, 69 yards, 1:20; South Florida 41–3)
- (2:19) USF – Michael Brown-Stephens 15-yard pass from Bryce Archie, Ty Ippolito kick (Drive: 1 play, 15 yards, 0:05; South Florida 48–3)

Fourth quarter

- No scoring plays

Statistics	BCU	USF
First downs	17	20
Plays–yards	74–170	69–403
Rushes–yards	41–48	46–231
Passing yards	122	172
Passing: Comp–Att–Int	17–33–2	15–23–0
Time of possession	37:40	22:20

Team	Category	Player	Statistics
Bethune–Cookman	Passing	Cam'Ron Ransom	12/19, 85 yards, 1 INT
Bethune–Cookman	Rushing	Courtney Reese	10 carries, 16 yards
Bethune–Cookman	Receiving	Lorenzo Jenkins	5 receptions, 53 yards
South Florida	Passing	Byrum Brown	13/20, 152 yards
South Florida	Rushing	Kelley Joiner	14 carries, 78 yards, 2 TD
South Florida	Receiving	Abdur-Rahmaan Yaseen	5 receptions, 73 yards

=== at No. 4 Alabama ===
South Florida Bulls (1–0) at No. 4 Alabama Crimson Tide (1–0) – Game summary

Quarter	1	2	3	4	Total
Bulls	3	3	7	3	16
No. 4 Crimson Tide	7	7	0	28	42

at Bryant–Denny Stadium • Tuscaloosa, Alabama

- Date: September 7th
- Game time: 7:00 p.m. EDT
- Game weather: Sunny • Temperature: 81 °F (27 °C) • Wind: S at 9 miles per hour (14 km/h)
- Game attendance: 100,077
- Referee: Ken Williamson
- TV announcers (ESPN): Joe Tessitore (play-by-play), Jesse Palmer (analyst), and Katie George (sideline reporter)

Game information

First quarter

- (11:26) USF – John Cannon 34-yard field goal (Drive: 13 plays, 60 yards, 3:34; South Florida 3–0)
- (5:08) ALA – Jalen Milroe 10-yard run, Graham Nicholson kick (Drive: 10 plays, 65 yards, 3:59; Alabama 7–3)

Second quarter

- (9:45) USF – John Cannon 25-yard field goal (Drive: 9 plays, 50 yards, 3:15; Alabama 7–6)
- (3:28) ALA – Jalen Milroe 5-yard run, Graham Nicholson kick (Drive: 11 plays, 75 yards, 6:17; Alabama 14–6)

Third quarter

- (9:35) USF – Ta'Ron Keith 2-yard run, John Cannon kick (Drive: 5 plays, 39 yards, 1:20; Alabama 14–13)

Fourth quarter

- (10:04) ALA – Kobe Prentice 16-yard pass from Jalen Milroe, Graham Nicholson kick (Drive: 4 plays, 34 yards, 1:46; Alabama 21–13)
- (6:45) USF – John Cannon 22-yard field goal (Drive: 8 plays, 71 yards, 3:19; Alabama 21–16)
- (5:50) ALA – Ryan Coleman-Williams 43-yard pass from Jalen Milroe, Graham Nicholson kick (Drive: 3 plays, 75 yards, 0:55; Alabama 28–16)
- (2:30) ALA – Jam Miller 56-yard run, Graham Nicholson kick (Drive: 2 plays, 60 yards, 0:50; Alabama 35–16)
- (1:37) ALA – Justice Haynes 29-yard run, Graham Nicholson kick (Drive: 1 play, 29 yards, 0:10; Alabama 42–16)

Statistics	USF	ALA
First downs	21	20
Plays–yards	82–309	68–393
Rushes–yards	46–206	42–199
Passing yards	103	194
Passing: Comp–Att–Int	16–36–0	16–26–0
Time of possession	28:47	31:13

Team	Category	Player	Statistics
South Florida	Passing	Byrum Brown	15/35, 103 yards
South Florida	Rushing	Byrum Brown	23 carries, 108 yards
South Florida	Receiving	Sean Atkins	4 receptions, 35 yards
Alabama	Passing	Jalen Milroe	16/26, 194 yards, 2 TD
Alabama	Rushing	Jam Miller	15 carries, 140 yards, 1 TD
Alabama	Receiving	Ryan Coleman-Williams	4 receptions, 68 yards, 1 TD

=== at Southern Miss ===
South Florida Bulls (1–1) at Southern Miss Golden Eagles (1–1) – Game summary

Quarter	1	2	3	4	Total
Bulls	14	14	14	7	49
Golden Eagles	14	7	0	3	24

at M. M. Roberts Stadium • Hattiesburg, Mississippi

- Date: September 14th
- Game time: 7:00 p.m. EDT
- Game weather: Cloudy • Temperature: 84 °F (29 °C) • Wind: NW at 2 miles per hour (3.2 km/h)
- Game attendance: 23,537
- Referee: Edwin Lee
- TV announcers (ESPN+): Jason Baker (play-by-play) and Austin Davis (analyst)

Game information

First quarter

- (12:22) USM – Kyirin Heath 19-yard pass from Tate Rodemaker, Andrew Stein kick (Drive: 6 plays, 87 yards, 2:33; Southern Miss 7–0)
- (7:05) USM – Kenyon Clay 37-yard pass from Tate Rodemaker, Andrew Stein kick (Drive: 7 plays, 65 yards, 3:00; Southern Miss 14–0)
- (2:55) USF – Payten Singletary 4-yard pass from Byrum Brown, John Cannon kick (Drive: 11 plays, 64 yards, 4:03; Southern Miss 14–7)
- (0:32) USF – Kelley Joiner 43-yard run, John Cannon kick (Drive: 2 plays, 38 yards, 0:13; Tied 14–14)

Second quarter

- (10:52) USF – Josh Hardeman 3-yard pass from Byrum Brown, John Cannon kick (Drive: 13 plays, 72 yards, 3:22; South Florida 21–14)
- (4:29) USF – Byrum Brown 1-yard run, John Cannon kick (Drive: 3 plays, 17 yards, 1:08; South Florida 28–14)
- (2:31) USM – Ethan Crawford 8-yard run, Andrew Stein kick (Drive: 4 plays, 75 yards, 1:58; South Florida 28–21)

Third quarter

- (8:12) USF – Ta'Ron Keith 3-yard run, John Cannon kick (Drive: 14 plays, 79 yards, 6:42; South Florida 35–21)
- (1:02) USF – Nay'Quan Wright 33-yard run, John Cannon kick (Drive: 8 plays, 93 yards, 3:20; South Florida 42–21)

Fourth quarter

- (9:25) USF – Kelley Joiner 50-yard run, John Cannon kick (Drive: 5 plays, 76 yards, 1:55; South Florida 49–21)
- (7:05) USM – Connor Gibbs 31-yard field goal (Drive: 6 plays, 61 yards, 2:21; South Florida 49–24)

Statistics	USF	USM
First downs	27	19
Plays–yards	81–562	61–487
Rushes–yards	51–369	28–90
Passing yards	193	397
Passing: Comp–Att–Int	19–30–0	19–33–1
Time of possession	33:39	26:21

Team	Category	Player	Statistics
South Florida	Passing	Byrum Brown	19/29, 193 yards, 2 TD
South Florida	Rushing	Kelley Joiner	10 carries, 117 yards, 2 TD
South Florida	Receiving	Sean Atkins	5 receptions, 87 yards
Southern Miss	Passing	Ethan Crawford	6/13, 183 yards, 1 INT
Southern Miss	Rushing	Rodrigues Clark	15 carries, 85 yards
Southern Miss	Receiving	Tiaquelin Mims	6 receptions, 128 yards

=== No. 8 Miami (FL) ===
No. 8 Miami Hurricanes (3–0) at South Florida Bulls (2–1) – Game summary

Quarter	1	2	3	4	Total
No. 8 Hurricanes	14	8	14	14	50
Bulls	9	6	0	0	15

at Raymond James Stadium • Tampa, Florida

- Date: September 21st
- Game time: 7:00 p.m. EDT
- Game weather: Sunny • Temperature: 83 °F (28 °C) • Wind: SE at 8 miles per hour (13 km/h)
- Game attendance: 58,616
- Referee: Tim Rich
- TV announcers (ESPN): Bob Wischusen (play-by-play), Louis Riddick (analyst), and Kris Budden (sideline reporter)

Game information

First quarter

- (11:30) MIA – Damien Martinez 2-yard run, Andres Borregales kick (Drive: 7 plays, 75 yards, 3:29; Miami 7–0)
- (8:28) USF – Nico Gramatica 58-yard field goal (Drive: 8 plays, 35 yards, 3:02; Miami 7–3)
- (6:52) USF – Byrum Brown 12-yard pass from Sean Atkins, extra-point blocked (Drive: 3 plays, 30 yards, 0:44; South Florida 9–7)
- (1:47) MIA – Isaiah Horton 6-yard pass from Cam Ward, Andres Borregales kick (Drive: 8 plays, 90 yards, 4:59; Miami 14–9)

Second quarter

- (14:14) USF – Nico Gramatica 51-yard field goal (Drive: 7 plays, 42 yards, 2:33; Miami 14–12)
- (2:36) USF – John Cannon 45-yard field goal (Drive: 19 plays, 66 yards, 8:30; South Florida 15–14)
- (1:56) MIA – Samuel Brown 76-yard pass from Cam Ward, Damien Martinez–Cam Ward two-point pass (Drive: 2 plays, 80 yards, 0:37; Miami 22–15)

Third quarter

- (7:25) MIA – Damien Martinez 1-yard run, Andres Borregales kick (Drive: 12 plays, 80 yards, 5:51; Miami 29–15)
- (0:55) MIA – Damien Martinez 1-yard run, Andres Borregales kick (Drive: 7 plays, 80 yards, 2:53; Miami 36–15)

Fourth quarter

- (7:44) MIA – Xavier Restrepo 5-yard pass from Cam Ward, Andres Borregales kick (Drive: 10 plays, 80 yards, 5:36; Miami 43–15)
- (3:09) MIA – Jordan Lyle 91-yard run, Andres Borregales kick (Drive: 3 plays, 96 yards, 1:39; Miami 50–15)

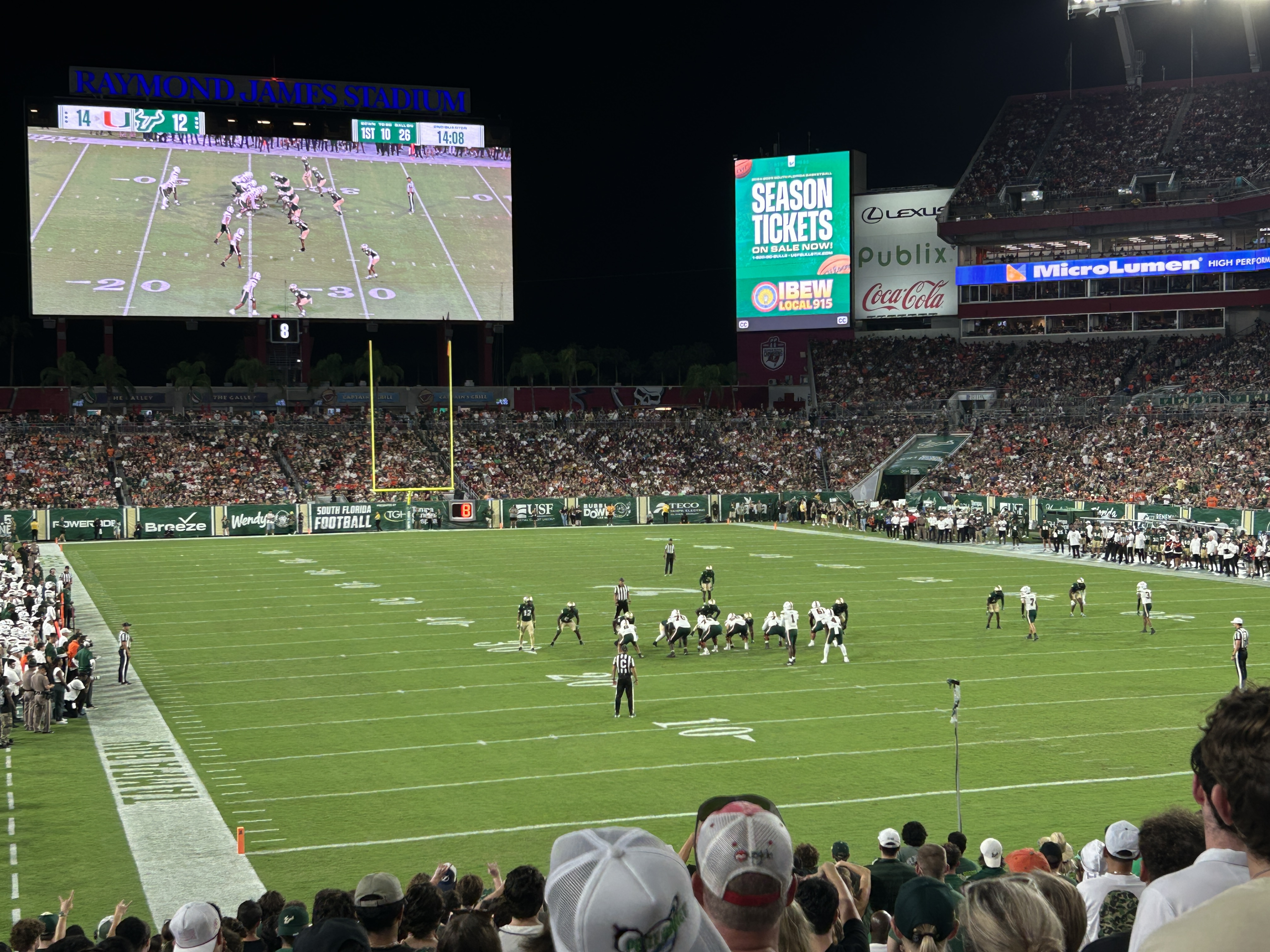
The Bulls take on the Hurricanes.

Statistics	MIA	USF
First downs	27	23
Plays–yards	63–592	75–365
Rushes–yards	29–188	32–62
Passing yards	404	303
Passing: Comp–Att–Int	24–34–1	26–43–2
Time of possession	31:22	28:38

Team	Category	Player	Statistics
Miami (FL)	Passing	Cameron Ward	24/34, 404 yards, 3 TD, 1 INT
Miami (FL)	Rushing	Jordan Lyle	6 carries, 104 yards, 1 TD
Miami (FL)	Receiving	Isaiah Horton	8 receptions, 108 yards, 1 TD
South Florida	Passing	Byrum Brown	19/30, 254 yards
South Florida	Rushing	Kelley Joiner	6 carries, 31 yards
South Florida	Receiving	Sean Atkins	11 receptions, 125 yards

=== at Tulane ===
South Florida Bulls (2–2) at Tulane Green Wave (2–2) – Game summary

Quarter	1	2	3	4	Total
Bulls	0	7	3	0	10
Green Wave	14	17	0	14	45

at Yulman Stadium • New Orleans, Louisiana

- Date: September 28th
- Game time: 12:00 p.m. EDT
- Game weather: Sunny • Temperature: 84 °F (29 °C) • Wind: W at 10 miles per hour (16 km/h)
- Game attendance: 20,783
- Referee: Kevin Randall
- TV announcers (ESPNU): Matt Schumacker (play-by-play) and Dustin Fox (analyst)

Game information

First quarter

- (10:37) TULN – Makhi Hughes 5-yard run, Ethan Head kick (Drive: 6 plays, 69 yards, 3:13; Tulane 7–0)
- (4:39) TULN – Dontae Fleming 15-yard pass from Darian Mensah, Ethan Head kick (Drive: 7 plays, 88 yards, 4:17; Tulane 14–0)

Second quarter

- (8:50) TULN – Ethan Head 35-yard field goal (Drive: 14 plays, 68 yards, 8:20; Tulane 17–0)
- (4:18) TULN – Mario Williams 53-yard pass from Darian Mensah, Ethan Head kick (Drive: 4 plays, 74 yards, 1:35; Tulane 24–0)
- (1:54) TULN – Mario Williams 27-yard pass from Darian Mensah, Ethan Head kick (Drive: 2 plays, 29 yards, 0:31; Tulane 31–0)
- (0:34) USF – Byrum Brown 10-yard run, John Cannon kick (Drive: 6 plays, 75 yards, 1:20; Tulane 31–7)

Third quarter

- (6:19) USF – John Cannon 45-yard field goal (Drive: 12 plays, 53 yards, 4:58; Tulane 31–10)

Fourth quarter

- (14:54) TULN – Makhi Hughes 9-yard run, Ethan Head kick (Drive: 12 plays, 75 yards, 6:25; Tulane 38–10)
- (12:28) TULN – Trey Cornist 2-yard run, Ethan Head kick (Drive: 2 plays, 51 yards, 0:28; Tulane 45–10)

Statistics	USF	TULN
First downs	12	30
Plays–yards	53–201	73–528
Rushes–yards	25–26	50–198
Passing yards	175	330
Passing: Comp–Att–Int	16–28–0	19–23–0
Time of possession	17:59	42:01

Team	Category	Player	Statistics
South Florida	Passing	Byrum Brown	12/18, 134 yards
South Florida	Rushing	Nay'Quan Wright	7 carries, 38 yards
South Florida	Receiving	Abdur-Rahmaan Yaseen	5 receptions, 84 yards
Tulane	Passing	Darian Mensah	18/22, 326 yards, 3 TD
Tulane	Rushing	Makhi Hughes	17 carries, 61 yards, 2 TD
Tulane	Receiving	Dontae Fleming	7 receptions, 128 yards, TD

=== Memphis ===
Memphis Tigers (4–1) at South Florida Bulls (2–3) – Game summary

Quarter	1	2	3	4	Total
Tigers	14	0	0	7	21
Bulls	0	3	0	0	3

at Camping World Stadium • Orlando, Florida

- Date: October 12th
- Game time: 3:30 p.m. EDT
- Game weather: Cloudy • Temperature: 82 °F (28 °C) • Wind: NE at 5 miles per hour (8.0 km/h)
- Game attendance: 3,365
- Referee: Charles Lamertina
- TV announcers (ESPN+): Drew Fellios (play-by-play) and Leger Douzable (analyst)

Game information

First quarter

- (9:50) MEM – DeMeer Blankumsee 31-yard pass from Seth Henigan, Caden Costa kick (Drive: 9 plays, 75 yards, 5:10; Memphis 7–0)
- (5:52) MEM – Mario Anderson Jr. 9-yard pass from Seth Henigan, Caden Costa kick (Drive: 3 plays, 33 yards, 0:37; Memphis 14–0)

Second quarter

- (0:00) USF – Nico Gramatica 52-yard field goal (Drive: 7 plays, 42 yards, 0:39; Memphis 14–3)

Third quarter

No scoring plays

Fourth quarter

- (11:17) MEM – Chandler Martin 0-yard fumble recovery, Caden Costa kick (Memphis 21–3)

Statistics	MEM	USF
First downs	17	12
Plays–yards	71–345	60–258
Rushes–yards	31–137	19–24
Passing yards	208	234
Passing: Comp–Att–Int	28–40–1	22–41–1
Time of possession	41:38	18:22

Team	Category	Player	Statistics
Memphis	Passing	Seth Henigan	28/40, 208 yards, 2 TD, INT
Memphis	Rushing	Brandon Thomas	13 carries, 67 yards
Memphis	Receiving	Anthony Landphere	6 receptions, 64 yards
South Florida	Passing	Bryce Archie	22/41, 234 yards, INT
South Florida	Rushing	Kelley Joiner	9 carries, 22 yards
South Florida	Receiving	Joshua Hardeman	2 receptions, 69 yards

=== UAB ===
UAB Blazers (1–5) at South Florida Bulls (2–4) – Game summary

Quarter	1	2	3	4	Total
Blazers	3	6	10	6	25
Bulls	0	7	13	15	35

at Raymond James Stadium • Tampa, Florida

- Date: October 19th
- Game time: 3:30 p.m. EDT
- Game weather: Cloudy • Temperature: 83 °F (28 °C) • Wind: NE 13 miles per hour (21 km/h)
- Game attendance: 28,154
- Referee: Steve Anderson
- TV announcers (ESPN+): Jason Ross Jr. (play-by-play) and Tyoka Jackson (analyst)

Game information

First quarter

- (6:24) UAB – Jonah Delange 41-yard field goal (Drive: 8 plays, 46 yards, 2:43; UAB 3–0)

Second quarter

- (12:21) USF – Keshaun Singleton 67-yard pass from Bryce Archie, John Cannon kick (Drive: 1 play, 67 yards, 0:09; South Florida 7–3)
- (7:34) UAB – Jonah Delange 29-yard field goal (Drive: 12 plays, 64 yards, 4:47; South Florida 7–6)
- (0:21) UAB – Jonah Delange 32-yard field goal (Drive: 11 plays, 85 yards, 1:32; UAB 9–7)

Third quarter

- (13:45) UAB – Amare Thomas 15-yard pass from Jalen Kitna, Jonah Delange kick (Drive: 3 plays, 65 yards, 1:15; UAB 16–7)
- (10:12) UAB – Jonah Delange 48-yard field goal (Drive: 4 plays, 2 yards, 1:06; UAB 19–7)
- (6:25) USF – Ta'Ron Keith 4-yard run, John Cannon kick (Drive: 9 plays, 65 yards, 3:40; UAB 19–14)
- (3:51) USF – Kelley Joiner 10-yard pass from Bryce Archie (Drive: 4 plays, 18 yards, 1:11; South Florida 20–19)

Fourth quarter

- (11:46) UAB – Amare Thomas 7-yard pass from Jalen Kitna, Jonah Delange kick (Drive: 11 plays, 70 yards, 4:55; UAB 25–20)
- (6:17) USF – Kelley Joiner 1-yard run, Michael Brown-Stephens pass (Drive: 3 plays, 16 yards, 0:27; South Florida 28–25)
- (2:55) USF – Kelley Joiner 33-yard run, John Cannon kick (Drive: 3 plays, 36 yards, 1:35; South Florida 35–25)

Statistics	UAB	USF
First downs	26	18
Plays–yards	90–485	73–355
Rushes–yards	34–101	41–154
Passing yards	384	201
Passing: Comp–Att–Int	33–56–1	17–32–1
Time of possession	34:35	25:18

Team	Category	Player	Statistics
UAB	Passing	Jalen Kitna	33/56, 384 yards, 2 TD, INT
UAB	Rushing	Lee Beebe Jr.	18 carries, 68 yards
UAB	Receiving	Amare Thomas	8 receptions, 97 yards, 2 TD
South Florida	Passing	Bryce Archie	17/31, 201 yards, 2 TD, INT
South Florida	Rushing	Kelley Joiner	15 carries, 94 yards, 2 TD
South Florida	Receiving	Keshaun Singleton	4 receptions, 105 yards, TD

=== at Florida Atlantic ===
South Florida Bulls (3–4) at Florida Atlantic Owls (2–5) – Game summary

Quarter	1	2	3	4	Total
Bulls	0	7	24	13	44
Owls	7	7	7	0	21

at FAU Stadium • Boca Raton, Florida

- Date: November 1st
- Game time: 7:30 p.m. EDT
- Game weather: Sunny
- Game attendance: 20,111
- Referee: Edwin Lee
- TV announcers (ESPN2): Anish Shroff (play-by-play), Andre Ware (analyst) and Paul Carcaterra (sideline)

Game information

First quarter

- (2:09) FAU – CJ Campbell Jr. 9-yard run, Morgan Suarez kick (Drive: 9 plays, 72 yards, 4:28; Florida Atlantic 7–0)

Second quarter

- (7:48) USF – Nay'Quan Wright 64-yard run, John Cannon kick (Drive: 2 plays, 68 yards, 0:33; Tied 7–7)
- (4:45) FAU – CJ Campbell Jr. 30-yard run, Morgan Suarez kick (Drive: 7 plays, 75 yards, 3:03; Florida Atlantic 14–7)

Third quarter

- (12:30) USF – Bryce Archie 1-yard run, John Cannon kick (Drive: 6 plays, 61 yards, 1:39; Tied 14–14)
- (10:25) FAU – CJ Campbell Jr. 63-yard pass from Cam Fancher, Morgan Suarez kick (Drive: 4 plays, 81 yards, 1:57; Florida Atlantic 21–14)
- (7:22) USF – Sean Atkins 13-yard pass from Bryce Archie, John Cannon kick (Drive: 11 plays, 75 yards, 3:03; Tied 21–21)
- (2:25) USF – John Cannon 34-yard field goal (Drive: 6 plays, 58 yards, 1:57; South Florida 24–21)
- (0:46) USF – Kelley Joiner 3-yard pass from Bryce Archie, John Cannon kick (Drive: 4 plays, 22 yards, 1:25; South Florida 31–21)

Fourth quarter

- (12:34) USF – Kelley Joiner 17-yard run, John Cannon kick (Drive: 5 plays, 61 yards, 2:00; South Florida 38–21)
- (10:57) USF – Ta'Ron Keith 42-yard run (Drive: 1 play, 42 yards, 0:09; South Florida 44–21)

Statistics	USF	FAU
First downs	25	22
Plays–yards	75–525	80–485
Rushes–yards	43–319	38–179
Passing yards	206	306
Passing: Comp–Att–Int	19–32–0	22–42–0
Time of possession	26:15	33:45

Team	Category	Player	Statistics
South Florida	Passing	Bryce Archie	19/32, 206 yards, 2 TD
South Florida	Rushing	Nay'Quan Wright	17 carries, 117 yards, TD
South Florida	Receiving	Sean Atkins	6 receptions, 57 yards, TD
Florida Atlantic	Passing	Cam Fancher	22/42, 306 yards, TD
Florida Atlantic	Rushing	CJ Campbell Jr.	12 carries, 90 yards, 2 TD
Florida Atlantic	Receiving	CJ Campbell Jr.	5 receptions, 78 yards, TD

=== Navy ===
Navy Midshipmen (6–2) at South Florida Bulls (4–4) – Game summary

Quarter	1	2	3	4	Total
Midshipmen	14	7	0	7	28
Bulls	0	0	0	7	7

at Raymond James Stadium • Tampa, Florida

- Date: November 9th
- Game time: 12:00 p.m. EST
- Game weather: Sunny • Temperature: 84 °F (29 °C) • Wind: W 10 miles per hour (16 km/h)
- Game attendance: 34,091
- Referee: Kevin Randall
- TV announcers (ESPN2): Roy Philpott (play-by-play), Sam Acho (analyst) and Taylor Davis (sideline)

Game information

First quarter

- (12:37) NAVY – Eli Heidenreich 60-yard run, Nathan Kirkwood kick (Drive: 4 plays, 70 yards, 2:23; Navy 7–0)
- (3:26) NAVY – Brandon Chatman 20-yard run, Nathan Kirkwood kick (Drive: 13 plays, 79 yards, 6:52; Navy 14–0)

Second quarter

- (0:02) NAVY – Alex Tecza 38-yard pass from Blake Horvath, Nathan Kirkwood kick (Drive: 2 plays, 53 yards, 0:12; Navy 21–0)

Third quarter

No scoring plays

Fourth quarter

- (11:45) NAVY – Blake Horvath 10-yard run, Nathan Kirkwood kick (Drive: 13 plays, 87 yards, 7:08; Navy 28–0)
- (1:06) USF – Michael Brown-Stephens 13-yard pass from Bryce Archie, John Cannon kick (Drive: 10 plays, 75 yards, 2:53; Navy 28–7)

Statistics	NAVY	USF
First downs	18	17
Plays–yards	70–379	69–342
Rushes–yards	59–321	25–60
Passing yards	58	282
Passing: Comp–Att–Int	6–11–0	26–44–2
Time of possession	38:32	21:28

Team	Category	Player	Statistics
Navy	Passing	Blake Horvath	6/11, 58 yards, TD
Navy	Rushing	Eli Heidenreich	6 carries, 84 yards, TD
Navy	Receiving	Alex Tecza	1 reception, 38 yards, TD
South Florida	Passing	Bryce Archie	26/43, 282 yards, TD, 2 INT
South Florida	Rushing	Kelley Joiner	9 carries, 23 yards
South Florida	Receiving	JeyQuan Smith	2 receptions, 85 yards

=== at Charlotte ===
South Florida Bulls (4–5) at Charlotte 49ers (3–6) – Game summary

Quarter	1	2	3	4	Total
Bulls	7	7	31	14	59
49ers	7	3	7	7	24

at Jerry Richardson Stadium • Charlotte, North Carolina

- Date: November 16th
- Game time: 3:30 p.m. EST
- Game weather: Sunny • Temperature: 66 °F (19 °C) • Wind: NW 2 miles per hour (3.2 km/h)
- Game attendance: 15,030
- Referee: Charles Lamertina
- TV announcers (ESPN+): Justin Kutcher (play-by-play), Reggie Walker (analyst) and Smacker Miles (sideline)

Game information

First quarter

- (5:18) CLT – Cartevious Norton 6-yard run, Stephen Rusnak kick (Drive: 12 plays, 73 yards, 5:47; Charlotte 7–0)
- (1:55) USF – Ta'Ron Keith 16-yard run, John Cannon kick (Drive: 8 plays, 75 yards, 3:24; Tied 7–7)

Second quarter

- (8:38) CLT – Stephen Rusnak 50-yard field goal (Drive: 10 plays, 40 yards, 4:39; Charlotte 10–7)
- (6:41) USF – Nay'Quan Wright 6-yard run, John Cannon kick (Drive: 6 plays, 75 yards, 1:58; South Florida 14–10)

Third quarter

- (12:57) USF – Kelley Joiner 54-yard run, John Cannon kick (Drive: 2 plays, 62 yards, 0:35; South Florida 21–10)
- (10:49) CLT – Cartevious Norton 2-yard run, Stephen Rusnak kick (Drive: 5 plays, 86 yards, 2:02; South Florida 21–17)
- (9:13) USF – Nay'Quan Wright 6-yard run, John Cannon kick (Drive: 5 plays, 70 yards, 1:36; South Florida 28–17)
- (4:26) USF – John Cannon 33-yard field goal (Drive: 5 plays, 17 yards, 2:39; South Florida 31–17)
- (3:38) USF – Brent Austin 14-yard interception, John Cannon kick (South Florida 38–17)
- (1:11) USF – Mac Harris 25-yard fumble recovery, John Cannon kick (South Florida 45–17)

Fourth quarter

- (13:43) CLT – Isaiah Myers 15-yard pass from Deshawn Purdie, Stephen Rusnak kick (Drive: 7 plays, 79 yards, 2:21; South Florida 45–24)
- (13:34) USF – Kelley Joiner 45-yard run, John Cannon kick (Drive: 1 play, 45 yards, 0:09; South Florida 52–24)
- (5:31) USF – Alvon Isaac 9-yard run, John Cannon kick (Drive: 4 plays, 66 yards, 2:08; South Florida 59–24)

Statistics	USF	CLT
First downs	26	22
Plays–yards	65–551	74–347
Rushes–yards	48–425	35–91
Passing yards	126	256
Passing: Comp–Att–Int	11–17–1	17–39–2
Time of possession	25:55	34:05

Team	Category	Player	Statistics
South Florida	Passing	Bryce Archie	11/16, 126 yards, INT
South Florida	Rushing	Kelley Joiner	9 carries, 140 yards, 2 TD
South Florida	Receiving	Nay'Quan Wright	2 receptions, 50 yards
Charlotte	Passing	Deshawn Purdie	17/39, 256 yards, TD, 2 INT
Charlotte	Rushing	Cartevious Norton	10 carries, 30 yards, 2 TD
Charlotte	Receiving	Isaiah Myers	4 receptions, 82 yards, TD

=== Tulsa ===
Tulsa Golden Hurricane (3–7) at South Florida Bulls (5–5) – Game summary

Quarter	1	2	3	4	Total
Golden Hurricane	0	7	0	23	30
Bulls	28	14	7	14	63

at Raymond James Stadium • Tampa, Florida

- Date: November 23rd
- Game time: 3:30 p.m. EST
- Game weather: Sunny • Temperature: 69 °F (21 °C) • Wind: SE 8 miles per hour (13 km/h)
- Game attendance: 27,623
- Referee: Steven Anderson
- TV announcers (ESPN+): Jason Ross Jr. (play-by-play) and Tyoka Jackson (analyst)

Game information

First quarter

- (14:19) USF – Kelley Joiner 48-yard run, John Cannon kick (Drive: 3 plays, 75 yards, 0:41; South Florida 7–0)
- (10:32) USF – Nay'Quan Wright 1-yard run, John Cannon kick (Drive: 10 plays, 55 yards, 2:55; South Florida 14–0)
- (6:15) USF – Kelley Joiner 1-yard run, John Cannon kick (Drive: 4 plays, 40 yards, 1:19; South Florida 21–0)
- (4:13) USF – Bryce Archie 6-yard run, John Cannon kick (Drive: 4 plays, 34 yards, 0:53; South Florida 28–0)

Second quarter

- (11:41) USF – Keshaun Singleton 58-yard pass from Bryce Archie, John Cannon kick (Drive: 7 plays, 94 yards, 2:38; South Florida 35–0)
- (8:20) TUL – Joseph Williams 11-yard pass from Cooper Legas, Seth Morgan kick (Drive: 9 plays, 75 yards, 3:21; South Florida 35–7)
- (2:11) USF – Payten Singletary 16-yard pass from Bryce Archie, John Cannon kick (Drive: 10 plays, 47 yards, 2:27; South Florida 42–7)

Third quarter

- (8:47) USF – Ta'Ron Keith 30-yard run, John Cannon kick (Drive: 3 plays, 41 yards, 0:59; South Florida 49–7)

Fourth quarter

- (11:45) TUL – Viron Ellison Jr. 1-yard run, Seth Morgan kick (Drive: 11 plays, 60 yards, 4:27; South Florida 49–14)
- (8:23) USF – Michael Brown-Stephens 20-yard pass from Israel Carter, John Cannon kick (Drive: 8 plays, 75 yards, 3:22; South Florida 56–14)
- (5:03) TUL – Lloyd Avant 10-yard run, Scott Stanford rush (Drive: 7 plays, 75 yards, 3:20; South Florida 56–22)
- (3:22) USF – Jonathan Echols 59-yard pass from Israel Carter, John Cannon kick (Drive: 3 plays, 65 yards, 1:41; South Florida 63–22)
- (2:37) TUL – Anthony Watkins 1-yard run, Joseph Williams pass (Drive: 2 plays, 15 yards, 0:29; South Florida 63–30)

Statistics	TLSA	USF
First downs	21	31
Plays–yards	81–478	91–715
Rushes–yards	47–223	52–308
Passing yards	255	407
Passing: Comp–Att–Int	16–34–3	27–39–1
Time of possession	28:57	31:03

Team	Category	Player	Statistics
Tulsa	Passing	Cooper Legas	10/25, 113 yards, TD, 3 INT
Tulsa	Rushing	Anthony Watkins	15 carries, 101 yards, TD
Tulsa	Receiving	Joseph Williams	6 receptions, 126 yards, TD
South Florida	Passing	Bryce Archie	21/31, 305 yards, 2 TD, INT
South Florida	Rushing	Kelley Joiner	10 carries, 131 yards, 2 TD
South Florida	Receiving	Keshaun Singleton	5 receptions, 96 yards, TD

=== at Rice ===
South Florida Bulls (6–5) at Rice Owls (3–8) – Game summary

Quarter	1	2	3	4	Total
Bulls	7	0	7	14	28
Owls	17	10	8	0	35

at Rice Stadium • Houston, Texas

- Date: November 30th
- Game time: 2:00 p.m. EST
- Game weather: Sunny • Temperature: 61 °F (16 °C) • Wind: E 8 miles per hour (13 km/h)
- Game attendance: 16,430
- Referee: Tim Rich
- TV announcers (ESPN+): David Salzman (play-by-play) and LaDarrin McLane (analyst)

Game information

First quarter

- (12:33) RIC – Drayden Dickmann 31-yard pass from E. J. Warner, Tim Horn kick (Drive: 5 plays, 92 yards, 2:17; Rice 7–0)
- (9:14) USF – Nay'Quan Wright 1-yard run, John Cannon kick (Drive: 10 plays, 75 yards, 3:19; Tied 7–7)
- (7:44) RIC – Quinton Jackosn 12-yard run, Tim Horn kick (Drive: 3 plays, 38 yards, 1:23; Rice 14–7)
- (0:22) RIC – Tim Horn 25-yard field goal (Drive: 6 plays, 15 yards, 1:38; Rice 17–7)

Second quarter

- (6:32) RIC – Dean Connors 23-yard pass from E. J. Warner, Tim Horn kick (Drive: 10 plays, 75 yards, 4:49; Rice 24–7)
- (0:12) RIC – Tim Horn 25-yard field goal (Drive: 11 plays, 58 yards, 5:03; Rice 27–7)

Third quarter

- (12:22) USF – Sean Atkins 16-yard pass from Bryce Archie, John Cannon kick (Drive: 7 plays, 75 yards, 2:38; Rice 27–14)
- (6:26) RIC – Thai Chiaokhiao-Bowman 33-yard pass from E. J. Warner, Matt Sykes pass (Drive: 3 plays, 65 yards, 0:57; Rice 35–14)

Fourth quarter

- (3:09) USF – Keshaun Singleton 28-yard pass from Israel Carter, John Cannon kick (Drive: 9 plays, 87 yards, 2:12; Rice 35–21)
- (2:25) USF – Michael Brown-Stephens 32-yard pass from Israel Carter, John Cannon kick (Drive: 3 plays, 42 yards, 0:28; Rice 35–28)

Statistics	USF	RICE
First downs	18	27
Plays–yards	72–431	82–550
Rushes–yards	30–111	40–120
Passing yards	320	430
Passing: Comp–Att–Int	24–42–1	27–42–0
Time of possession	21:23	38:38

Team	Category	Player	Statistics
South Florida	Passing	Bryce Archie	19/35, 227 yards, TD, INT
South Florida	Rushing	Nay'Quan Wright	6 carries, 35 yards, TD
South Florida	Receiving	Sean Atkins	7 receptions, 110 yards, TD
Rice	Passing	E. J. Warner	27/42, 430 yards, 3 TD
Rice	Rushing	Christian Francisco	12 carries, 42 yards
Rice	Receiving	Matt Sykes	7 receptions, 118 yards

=== vs San Jose State (Hawaii Bowl) ===
2024 Hawaii Bowl
South Florida Bulls (6–6) vs San Jose State Spartans (7–5) – Game summary

Quarter	1	2	3	4	OT	2OT	3OT	4OT	5OT	Total
Bulls	7	14	0	6	7	3	2	0	2	41
Spartans	0	10	10	7	7	3	2	0	0	39

at Clarence T. C. Ching Athletics Complex • Honolulu, HI

- Date: December 24th
- Game time: 7:00 p.m. EST
- Game weather: Sunny • 77 °F (25 °C) • Wind: ENE at 17 miles per hour (27 km/h)
- Game attendance: 6,720
- Referee: Tim Barker
- TV announcers (ESPN): Tiffany Greene (play-by-play), Jay Walker (analyst), and Marilyn Payne (sideline) (ESPN)/Kevin Winter (play-by-play) and Trevor Matich (analyst) (ESPN Radio)
- Box score

Game information

First Quarter

- (0:45) USF – Kelley Joiner 4 yard run, John Cannon kick (Drive: 5 plays, 16 yards, 1:32; South Florida 7–0)

Second Quarter

- (6:53) USF – Nay'Quan Wright 3 yard run, John Cannon kick (Drive: 13 plays, 80 yards, 5:31; South Florida 14–0)
- (2:09) SJSU – Floyd Chalk IV 3 yard run, Kyler Halvorsen kick (Drive: 9 plays, 70 yards, 4:37; South Florida 14–7)
- (1:53) USF – Ta'Ron Keith 93 yard kickoff return, John Cannon kick (Drive: 9 plays, 70 yards, 4:37; South Florida 21–7)
- (0:00) SJSU – Kyler Halvorsen 42 yard field goal (Drive: 11 plays, 51 yards, 1:53; South Florida 21–10)

Third Quarter

- (9:05) SJSU – Kyler Halvorsen 22 yard field goal (Drive: 11 plays, 77 yards, 5:12; South Florida 21–13)
- (3:41) SJSU – Jackson Canaan 5 yard pass from Walker Eget, Kyler Halvorsen kick (Drive: 6 plays, 85 yards, 3:21; South Florida 21–20)

Fourth Quarter

- (13:00) USF – John Cannon 33 yard field goal (Drive: 15 plays, 60 yards, 5:41; South Florida 24–20)
- (11:14) SJSU – Lamar Radcliffe 2 yard run, Kyler Halvorsen kick (Drive: 1 plays, 2 yards, 0:04; San Jose State 27–24)
- (0:02) USF – John Cannon 41 yard field goal (Drive: 7 plays, 27 yards, 0:41; Tied 27–27)

Overtime

- USF – Ta'Ron Keith 2 yard run, John Cannon kick (Drive: 2 plays, 25 yards; South Florida 32–27)
- SJSU – Matthew Coleman 4 yard pass from Walker Eget, Kyler Halvorsen kick (Drive: 11 plays, 25 yards; Tied 34–34)

Second Overtime

- SJSU – Kyler Halvorsen 24 yard field goal (Drive: 5 plays, 18 yards; San Jose State 37–34)
- USF – John Cannon 36 yard field goal (Drive: 4 plays, 7 yards; Tied 37–37)

Third Overtime

- USF – Bryce Archie pass to Payten Singletary for 2-Point Conversion (Drive: 1 plays, 0 yards; South Florida 39–37)
- SJSU – Walker Eget Pass to Matthew Coleman for 2-Point Conversion (Drive: 1 plays, 0 yards; Tied 39–39)

Fourth Overtime

- No scoring

Fifth Overtime

- USF – Bryce Archie pass to Keshaun Singleton for 2-Point Conversion (Drive: 1 plays, 0 yards; South Florida 41–39)

Statistics	USF	SJSU
First downs	15	29
Total yards	291	441
Rushing yards	235	280
Passing yards	56	161
Passing: Comp–Att–Int	24–35–1	33–58–1
Time of possession	27:27	32:22

Team	Category	Player	Statistics
South Florida	Passing	Bryce Archie	24/35, 235 yards, INT
South Florida	Rushing	Kelley Joiner	11 carries, 33 yards, 1 TD
South Florida	Receiving	Sean Atkins	11 receptions, 13 targets, 104 yards
San Jose State	Passing	Walker Eget	33/58, 280 yds, 2 TDs, INT
San Jose State	Rushing	Lamar Radcliffe	15 carries, 65 yards, 1 TD
San Jose State	Receiving	Matthew Coleman	12 receptions, 15 targets, 109 yards, 1 TD
