= 2023 SMU Mustangs football team =

American college football season

2023 SMU Mustangs football
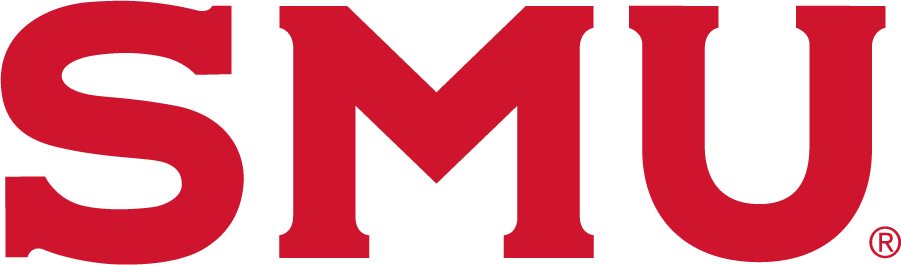

AAC champion

AAC Championship Game, W 26–14 vs. Tulane

Fenway Bowl, L 14–23 vs. Boston College
- Conference: American Athletic Conference

Ranking
- Coaches: No. 24
- AP: No. 22
- Record: 11–3 (8–0 The American)
- Head coach: Rhett Lashlee (2nd season)
- Offensive coordinator: Casey Woods (2nd season)
- Co-offensive coordinators: Jonathan Brewer (1st season); Rob Likens (1st season)
- Offensive scheme: Bear raid
- Defensive coordinator: Scott Symons (2nd season)
- Base defense: Multiple 3–4
- Home stadium: Gerald J. Ford Stadium

Uniform
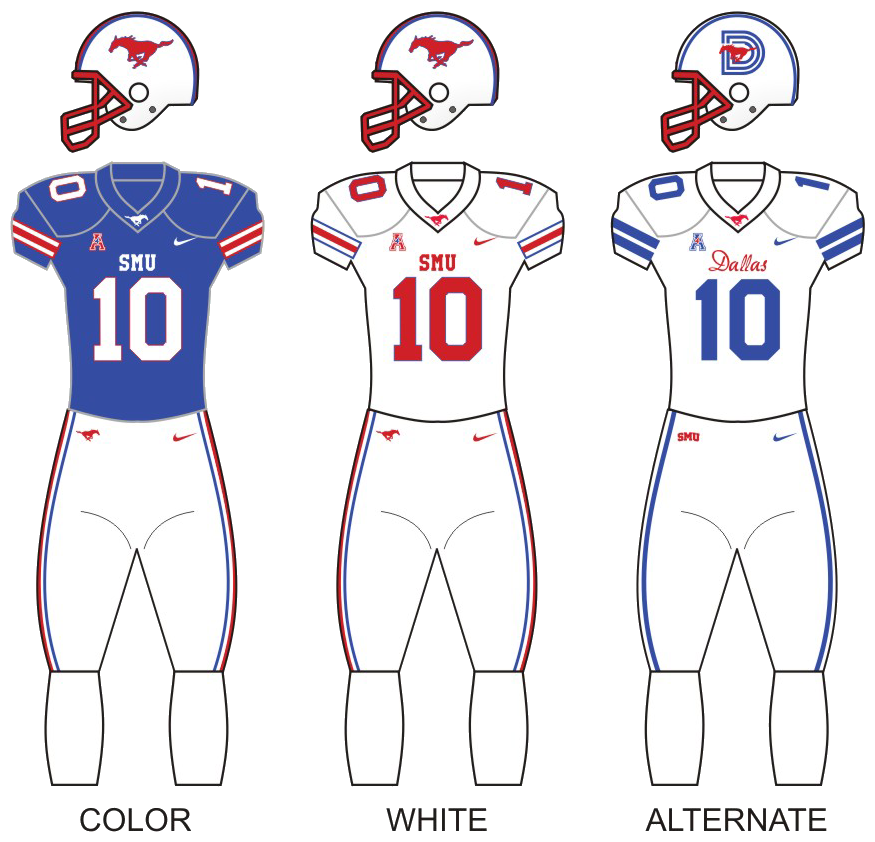

2023 American Athletic Conference football standings
	Conf.			Overall
Team	W		L	W		L
No. 22 SMU y$	8	–	0	11	–	3
Tulane y	8	–	0	11	–	3
UTSA	7	–	1	9	–	4
Memphis	6	–	2	10	–	3
South Florida	4	–	4	7	–	6
Rice	4	–	4	6	–	7
Navy	4	–	4	5	–	7
North Texas	3	–	5	5	–	7
UAB	3	–	5	4	–	8
Florida Atlantic	3	–	5	4	–	8
Charlotte	2	–	6	3	–	9
Tulsa	2	–	6	4	–	8
Temple	1	–	7	3	–	9
East Carolina	1	–	7	2	–	10
Championship: SMU 26, Tulane 14
$ – Conference champion; y – Championship game participant; Rankings from AP Poll

The 2023 SMU Mustangs football team represented Southern Methodist University in the 2023 NCAA Division I FBS football season. The Mustangs played their home games at Gerald J. Ford Stadium in University Park, Texas, a separate city within the city limits of Dallas, and competed in the American Athletic Conference (The American). They were led by second-year head coach Rhett Lashlee.

For the first time since 2019, the Mustangs won six conference games. The Mustangs finished the regular season going 8–0 in conference play to qualify for the AAC Championship Game, for the Mustangs' first appearance in a conference championship game since the 2010 CUSA Championship Game. SMU defeated Tulane 26–14 in the title game for the program's first conference title since 1984 when the Mustangs won a share of the Southwest Conference title. After defeating Tulane, SMU accepted a bid to compete in the 2023 Fenway Bowl against Boston College. In the final CFP rankings, SMU fell one spot behind undefeated C-USA champion Liberty University, narrowly missing the opportunity to play in the Fiesta Bowl against Oregon on New Year's Day. This was SMU's final season in the American before they moved to the Atlantic Coast Conference in 2024.

The SMU Mustangs football team drew an average home attendance of 22,616 in 2023.

== Preseason ==
=== Media poll ===
The American Athletic Conference preseason poll was released on July 25. The Mustangs were predicted to finish third in the conference.

== Schedule ==
SMU and the American Athletic Conference (AAC) announced the 2023 football schedule on February 21, 2023. The Mustangs' regular season schedule consisted of six home games and six away games.

SMU played three of the six new conference members, hosting Charlotte and North Texas and traveled to Rice. Additionally, SMU hosted AAC foes Tulsa and Navy and traveled to East Carolina, Temple, and Memphis.

For non-conference play, SMU hosted Louisiana Tech from Conference USA and FCS Prairie View A&M from the Southwestern Athletic Conference and traveled to Oklahoma and TCU, both from the Big 12 Conference.

Date	Time	Opponent	Rank	Site	TV	Result	Attendance
September 2	11:00 a.m.	Louisiana Tech*		Gerald J. Ford Stadium; University Park, TX	ESPNU	W 38–14	21,490
September 9	5:00 p.m.	at No. 18 Oklahoma*		Gaylord Family Oklahoma Memorial Stadium; Norman, OK	ESPN+	L 11–28	84,186
September 16	6:00 p.m.	Prairie View A&M*		Gerald J. Ford Stadium; University Park, TX	ESPN+	W 69–0	24,489
September 23	11:00 a.m.	at TCU*		Amon G. Carter Stadium; Fort Worth, TX (Battle for the Iron Skillet)	FS1	L 17–34	51,243
September 30	6:30 p.m.	Charlotte		Gerald J. Ford Stadium; University Park, TX	ESPNU	W 34–16	25,385
October 12	6:30 p.m.	at East Carolina		Dowdy–Ficklen Stadium; Greenville, NC	ESPN	W 31–10	33,444
October 20	6:00 p.m.	at Temple		Lincoln Financial Field; Philadelphia, PA	ESPN	W 55–0	11,232
October 28	11:00 a.m.	Tulsa^{†}		Gerald J. Ford Stadium; University Park, TX	ESPNU	W 69–10	20,800
November 4	6:30 p.m.	at Rice		Rice Stadium; Houston, TX (Battle for the Mayor's Cup)	ESPNU	W 36–31	21,632
November 10	8:00 p.m.	North Texas		Gerald J. Ford Stadium; University Park, TX (Safeway Bowl)	ESPN2	W 45–21	22,043
November 18	11:00 a.m.	at Memphis		Simmons Bank Liberty Stadium; Memphis, TN	ESPN2	W 38–34	30,313
November 25	11:00 a.m.	Navy		Gerald J. Ford Stadium; University Park, TX (Gansz Trophy)	ESPN2	W 59–14	21,490
December 2	4:00 p.m.	at No. 22 Tulane		Yulman Stadium; New Orleans, LA (AAC Championship Game)	ABC	W 26–14	25,206
December 28	10:00 a.m.	vs. Boston College*	No. 24	Fenway Park; Boston, MA (Fenway Bowl)	ESPN	L 14–23	16,238
*Non-conference game; ^{†}Homecoming; Rankings from AP Poll (and CFP Rankings, after October 31) released prior to game; All times are in Central time

== Rankings ==
Ranking movements Legend: ██ Increase in ranking ██ Decrease in ranking — = Not ranked RV = Received votes
	Week															
Poll	Pre	1	2	3	4	5	6	7	8	9	10	11	12	13	14	Final
AP	—	—	—	—	—	—	—	—	—	—	RV	RV	RV	25	17	22
Coaches	RV	RV	—	—	—	—	—	—	RV	RV	RV	RV	25	24	19	24
CFP	Not released									—	—	—	—	—	24	Not released

== Personnel ==
2023 SMU Mustangs football team roster
Players
Coaches
Offense

Pos.	#	Name	Class
RB	0	Camar Wheaton	So
WR	1	Jordan Kerley	Sr
QB	2	Preston Stone	So
WR	3	Romello Brinson	Jr
RB	4	Jaylan Knighton	Sr
WR	5	Moochie Dixon	Jr
QB	6	Keldric Luster	Fr
QB	7	Kevin Jennings	Fr
WR	8	Jordan Hudson	So
WR	9	Key'Shawn Smith	Sr
WR	10	Jamarion Carroll	Fr
RB	11	L. J. Johnson Jr.	So
WR	12	Jake Bailey	Sr
WR	13	Roderick Daniels Jr.	Jr
TE	14	Nolan Matthews-Harris	Jr
WR	15	Jaxson Lavender	Fr
QB	16	Alex Padilla	Sr
WR	18	Teddy Knox	So
QB	21	Clyde Pittman	Fr
RB	24	Velton Gardner	Sr
QB	25	William Fierro	Fr
QB	26	Owen Easley	Sr
RB	27	Zane Minors	So
QB	28	Charlie Fiser	Fr
WR	30	Carter Campbell	Jr
RB	31	Tyler Lavine	Sr
WR	32	Joey Bruszer	Fr
WR	33	Meyer Pereira	Fr
WR	34	Case Holleron	Fr
WR	35	Henry Stickler	Fr
WR	36	Cooper Reid	Fr
QB	38	Maddox Fuller	Fr
WR	39	Keaton Cheves	Fr
WR	42	Will Kuehne	Sr
OL	44	Stone Eby	So
TE	45	Ned Righellis	Fr
TE	46	Markus Schumacher	Fr
WR	47	Nic Heck	Sr
OL	50	Hyrin White	Sr
OL	51	Justin Osborne	Sr
OL	52	Marcus Bryant	Sr
OL	53	Jakai Clark	Sr
OL	56	Branson Hickman	Jr
OL	59	P. J. Williams	Fr
OL	60	Hunter Ryan	Fr
OL	61	Henry Douglas	Fr
OL	64	Cameron Ervin	Sr
OL	65	Jack Laphen	Fr
OL	66	Max Yao	Jr
OL	67	Sean Scott	Fr
OL	68	Jackson Ritz	Jr
OL	69	Jacob Waller	Fr
OL	70	Paxton Briggle	Fr
OL	71	Logan Parr	Jr
OL	72	Caleb Johnson	So
OL	74	Nate Bennett	Fr
OL	75	Ben Sparks	Jr
OL	76	Keaton Schultz	So
OL	77	Alex Woods	Fr
OL	78	Dalton Perdue	Jr
OL	79	Reagan Gill	Fr
TE	81	Lonnie Johnson	Fr
TE	82	R. J. Maryland	So
TE	83	Micah Hilts	Sr
TE	84	Tripp Riordan	Fr
TE	85	Adam Moore	Fr
TE	86	David Hawkins	Jr
TE	89	Kam Allen	So

Defense

Pos.	#	Name	Class
S	0	Bryan Massey	Sr
S	1	Brandon Crossley	Sr
S	2	Jonathan McGill	Sr
CB	3	Charles Woods	Sr
CB	4	Jahari Rogers	Jr
DE	5	Elijah Roberts	Sr
DL	6	Jordan Miller	Sr
CB	7	Bryce McMorris	So
LB	8	JaQwondis Burns	Jr
DE	9	Nelson Paul	Sr
DE	10	David Abiara	So
DE	11	Je'lin Samuels	So
CB	12	Chris Megginson	Sr
CB	13	Jaelyn Davis-Robinson	Fr
CB	14	A. J. Davis	Fr
DE	15	Cameron Robertson	So
S	16	Ahmaad Moses	So
S	20	Chris Adimora	Sr
CB	21	Kyron Chambers	So
S	22	Cale Sanders Jr.	Jr
S	23	Isaiah Nwokobia	So
LB	24	Kobe Wilson	Jr
CB	25	Kevaris Hall	Jr
CB	26	Keyshon Mills	Fr
S	27	Abdul Muhammad	Fr
LB	29	Brandon Miyazono	Fr
S	30	Nate Monticure	Jr
CB	31	Ford Parker	Sr
DB	32	Brock Foster	Fr
CB	33	Michael De Hoyos	Fr
LB	34	Ahmad Walker	Jr
S	35	Will Goldberg	Jr
DE	36	Braeden Flowers	Fr
DT	40	Elijah Chatman	Sr
DT	41	Stephon Wright	Jr
DE	45	Jayden Jones	So
LB	46	I. V. Webb	Fr
LB	52	Sean Kane	Fr
LB	54	Alex Kilgore	Fr
DE	58	Isaiah Smith	So
DE	90	Alex Sickafoose	Sr
DE	91	Dylan Hinshaw	Fr
DT	92	Kori Roberson Jr.	Sr
DT	93	Kevin Allen	Fr
DT	94	Braylen Jackson	Fr
DE	95	Matt Baer	Fr
DT	96	DeVere Levelston	Sr
DT	97	Dylan Frazier	Fr
DT	98	Mike Yoan Sandjo-Njiki	Jr
DT	99	Daemian Wimberly	Fr

Special teams

Pos.	#	Name	Class
K	41	Collin Rogers	So
LS	48	Will Benton IV	Sr
LS	49	Jovoni Borbon	So
LS	53	Marcus Chan	Fr
P	91	Sam Eccles	Fr
P	92	Ryan Bujcevski	Sr
P	94	Michael Tadros	Fr
P	95	Johnny Schifano	Jr

Head coach

- Rhett Lashlee

Coordinators/assistant coaches

- Casey Woods
  Offensive coordinator/Tight ends
- Jonathan Brewer
  Co-offensive coordinator/Quarterbacks
- Rob Likens
  Associate head coach/Co-offensive coordinator/Wide receivers
- Scott Symons
  Defensive coordinator
- Kyle Cooper
  Safeties/Special teams coordinator
- Maurice Crum Jr.
  Linebackers/Run game coordinator
- Khenon Hall
  Running backs/Run game coordinator
- Rickley Hunley Jr.
  Cornerbacks/Pass game coordinator
- Garin Justice
  Offensive line
- Calvin Thibodeaux
  Defensive line

Legend

- (C) Team captain
- (S) Suspended
- (I) Ineligible
- Injured
- Redshirt

Roster
Last update: September 15, 2023

== Game summaries ==
=== Louisiana Tech ===
Louisiana Tech Bulldogs at SMU Mustangs – Game summary

Quarter	1	2	3	4	Total
Bulldogs	0	0	7	7	14
Mustangs	14	17	0	7	38

at Gerald J. Ford Stadium, University Park, Texas

- Date: September 2
- Game time: 11:00 a.m. CDT
- Game weather: Sunny, 86 °F (30 °C)
- Game attendance: 21,490
- Referee: Tim Rich
- TV announcers (ESPNU): Brian Custer, Rod Gilmore, and Lauren Sisler
- Box score, Recap

Game information
First quarter
- SMU – Jordan Hudson 67-yard pass from Preston Stone (Collin Rogers kick), 4:17. Mustangs 7–0. Drive: 1 play, 67 yards, 0:10.
- SMU – Kori Roberson 16-yard interception return (Collin Rogers kick), 3:36. Mustangs 14–0.

Second quarter

- SMU – Collin Rogers 34-yard field goal, 14:11. Mustangs 17–0. Drive: 9 plays, 41 yards, 3:30.
- SMU – Nolan Matthews-Harris 9-yard pass from Preston Stone (Collin Rogers kick), 5:08. Mustangs 24–0. Drive: 11 plays, 98 yards, 5:21.
- SMU – R. J. Maryland 25-yard pass from Preston Stone (Collin Rogers kick), 0:02. Mustangs 31–0. Drive: 4 plays, 92 yards, 0:28.

Third quarter

- LT – Koby Duru 53-yard pass from Hank Bachmeier (Jacob Barnes kick), 13:52. Mustangs 31–7. Drive: 4 plays, 75 yards, 1:08.

Fourth quarter

- SMU – L. J. Johnson Jr 1-yard run (Collin Rogers kick), 2:32. Mustangs 38–7. Drive: 13 plays, 46 yards, 5:34.
- LT – Keith Willis Jr. 2-yard run (Jacob Barnes kick), 0:26. Mustangs 38–14. Drive: 8 plays, 65 yards, 2:06.

Statistics	LT	SMU
First downs	11	24
Total yards	269	457
Rushing yards	28	209
Passing yards	241	248
Turnovers	1	0
Time of possession	26:03	33:57

Team	Category	Player	Statistics
Louisiana Tech	Passing	Hank Bachmeier	21/33, 241 yards, TD, INT
Louisiana Tech	Rushing	Charvis Thornton	8 rushes, 24 yards
Louisiana Tech	Receiving	Koby Duru	3 receptions, 55 yards, TD
SMU	Passing	Preston Stone	23/37, 248 yards, 3 TD
SMU	Rushing	L. J. Johnson Jr.	14 rushes, 128 yards, TD
SMU	Receiving	Jordan Hudson	2 receptions, 72 yards, TD

SMU opened the season by defeating Louisiana Tech 38–14. The previous day, SMU had announced that it would join the Atlantic Coast Conference starting in the 2024 season.

=== At No. 18 Oklahoma ===
SMU Mustangs at No. 18 Oklahoma Sooners – Game summary

Quarter	1	2	3	4	Total
Mustangs	3	0	0	8	11
No. 18 Sooners	7	7	0	14	28

at Gaylord Family Oklahoma Memorial Stadium, Norman, Oklahoma

- Date: September 9
- Game time: 5:00 p.m. CDT
- Game weather: Sunny, 91 °F (33 °C)
- Game attendance: 84,186
- Referee: Michael VanderVelde
- TV announcers (ESPN+): Shawn Kenney, Ryan Leaf, and Tori Petry
- Box score, Recap

Game information
First quarter
- OU – Andrel Anthony 29-yard pass from Dillon Gabriel (Zach Schmit kick), 10:39. Sooners 7–0. Drive: 3 plays, 38 yards, 1:04.
- SMU – Collin Rogers 27-yard field goal, 8:43. Sooners 7–3. Drive: 8 plays, 65 yards, 1:56.

Second quarter

- OU – Blake Smith 2-yard pass from Dillon Gabriel (Zach Schmit kick), 8:33. Sooners 14–3. Drive: 13 plays, 94 yards, 4:53.

Third quarter

- No scoring plays

Fourth quarter

- SMU – Stone Eby 2-yard pass from Preston Stone (Preston Stone pass to Jake Bailey), 12:09. Sooners 14–11. Drive: 16 plays, 81 yards, 6:56.
- OU – Jalil Farooq 21-yard pass from Dillon Gabriel (Zach Schmit kick), 9:01. Sooners 21–11. Drive: 11 plays, 75 yards, 3:08.
- OU – Marcus Major 27-yard pass from Dillon Gabriel (Zach Schmit kick), 6:40. Sonners 28–11. Drive: 3 plays, 30 yards, 0:51.

Statistics	SMU	OU
First downs	21	22
Total yards	367	365
Rushing yards	117	189
Passing yards	250	176
Turnovers	2	0
Time of possession	32:20	27:40

Team	Category	Player	Statistics
SMU	Passing	Preston Stone	26/45, 250 yards, TD, INT
SMU	Rushing	Jaylan Knighton	15 rushes, 76 yards
SMU	Receiving	Jake Bailey	7 receptions, 73 yards
Oklahoma	Passing	Dillon Gabriel	19/27, 176 yards, 4 TD
Oklahoma	Rushing	Tawee Walker	21 rushes, 117 yards
Oklahoma	Receiving	Andrel Anthony	7 receptions, 76 yards, TD

During the 2022 season, SMU signed a contract with the University of Oklahoma to play a two game series non-conference series, which would consist of one home game for each team in the 2023 and 2027 series. The Sooners defeated SMU 28–11 in Norman.

=== Prairie View A&M ===
Prairie View A&M Panthers at SMU Mustangs – Game summary

Quarter	1	2	3	4	Total
Panthers	0	0	0	0	0
Mustangs	14	28	21	6	69

at Gerald J. Ford Stadium, University Park, Texas

- Date: September 16
- Game time: 6:00 p.m. CDT
- Game weather: Cloudy, 80 °F (27 °C)
- Game attendance: 24,489
- Referee: Scott Hardin
- TV announcers (ESPN+): Ted Emrich and Stanford Routt
- Box score, Recap

Game information
First quarter
- SMU – Jordan Hudson 15-yard pass from Preston Stone (Collin Rogers kick), 11:17. Mustangs 7–0. Drive: 7 plays, 50 yards, 2:25.
- SMU – Chris Megginson 53-yard blocked field goal return (Collin Rogers kick), 3:13. Mustangs 14–0.

Second quarter

- SMU – Roderick Daniels Jr. 91-yard pass from Preston Stone (Collin Rogers kick), 14:40. Mustangs 21–0. Drive: 1 play, 91 yards, 0:12.
- SMU – Preston Stone 5-yard run (Collin Rogers kick), 8:23. Mustangs 28–0. Drive: 8 plays, 60 yards, 3:16.
- SMU – Romello Brinson 5-yard pass from Preston Stone (Collin Rogers kick), 3:44. Mustangs 35–0. Drive: 8 plays, 74 yards, 2:00.
- SMU – Jordan Kerley 4-yard pass from Preston Stone (Collin Rogers kick), 0:05. Mustangs 42–0. Drive: 9 plays, 80 yards, 2:00.

Third quarter

- SMU – Jordan Kerley 59-yard pass from Preston Stone (Collin Rogers kick), 14:34. Mustangs 49–0. Drive: 2 plays, 59 yards, 0:16.
- SMU – Key'Shawn Smith 27-yard pass from Kevin Jennings (Collin Rogers kick), 11:02. Mustangs 56–0. Drive: 5 plays, 56 yards, 2:00.
- SMU – Joey Bruszer 23-yard pass from Kevin Jennings (Collin Rogers kick), 5:46. Mustangs 63–0. Drive: 7 plays, 53 yards, 3:33.

Fourth quarter

- SMU – Camar Wheaton 3-yard run (kick blocked), 14:18. Mustangs 69–0. Drive: 9 plays, 60 yards, 4:55.

Statistics	PV	SMU
First downs	10	28
Total yards	156	566
Rushing yards	94	177
Passing yards	62	389
Turnovers	0	1
Time of possession	34:14	25:46

Team	Category	Player	Statistics
Prairie View A&M	Passing	Trazon Connley	6/14, 51 yards
Prairie View A&M	Rushing	Ronald Young Jr.	7 rushes, 32 yards
Prairie View A&M	Receiving	Khristopher Simmons	3 receptions, 25 yards
SMU	Passing	Preston Stone	15/20, 300 yards, 5 TD, INT
SMU	Rushing	Camar Wheaton	16 rushes, 75 yards, TD
SMU	Receiving	Roderick Daniels Jr.	3 receptions, 96 yards, TD

=== At TCU ===
SMU Mustangs at TCU Horned Frogs – Game summary

Quarter	1	2	3	4	Total
Mustangs	3	7	0	7	17
Horned Frogs	7	7	13	7	34

at Amon G. Carter Stadium, Fort Worth, Texas

- Date: September 23
- Game time: 11:00 a.m. CDT
- Game weather: Sunny, 89 °F (32 °C)
- Game attendance: 51,243
- Referee: Nate Black
- TV announcers (FS1): Eric Collins and Devin Gardner
- Box score, Recap

Game information
First quarter
- SMU – Collin Rogers 24-yard field goal, 8:43. Mustangs 3–0. Drive: 14 plays, 69 yards, 6:17.
- TCU – Jared Wiley 9-yard pass from Chandler Morris (Griffin Kell kick), 0:16. Horned Frogs 7–3. Drive: 10 plays, 46 yards, 3:01.

Second quarter

- TCU – Jared Wiley 2-yard pass from Chandler Morris (Griffin Kell kick), 6:58. Horned Frogs 14–3. Drive: 10 plays, 68 yards, 4:07.
- SMU – Camar Wheaton 1-yard run (Collin Rogers kick), 2:54. Horned Frogs 14–10. Drive: 9 plays, 75 yards, 4:04.

Third quarter

- TCU – Griffin Kell 35-yard field goal, 11:05. Horned Frogs 17–10. Drive: 12 plays, 58 yards, 3:55.
- TCU – Griffin Kell 24-yard field goal, 6:14. Horned Frogs 20–10. Drive: 11 plays, 54 yards, 4:17.
- TCU – Emani Bailey 24-yard run (Griffin Kell kick), 1:54. Horned Frogs 27–10. Drive: 5 plays, 64 yards, 1:33.

Fourth quarter

- SMU – Tyler Lavine 2-yard run (Collin Rogers kick), 1:47. Horned Frogs 27–17. Drive: 13 plays, 72 yards, 4:48.
- TCU – Chase Curtis 36-yard pass from Chandler Morris (Griffin Kell kick), 1:18. Horned Frogs 34–17. Drive: 4 plays, 44 yards, 0:29.

Statistics	SMU	TCU
First downs	21	25
Total yards	416	457
Rushing yards	158	192
Passing yards	258	265
Turnovers	2	0
Time of possession	30:12	29:48

Team	Category	Player	Statistics
SMU	Passing	Preston Stone	16/35, 258 yards, 2 INT
SMU	Rushing	Camar Wheaton	16 rushes, 73 yards, TD
SMU	Receiving	Jordan Kerley	1 reception, 51 yards
TCU	Passing	Chandler Morris	23/32, 261 yards, 3 TD
TCU	Rushing	Emani Bailey	25 rushes, 126 yards, TD
TCU	Receiving	Chase Curtis	2 receptions, 55 yards, TD

Prior to the start of the 2023 season, TCU announced it was indefinitely suspending the Battle for the Iron Skillet after the 2025 season. TCU defeated SMU 34–17.

=== Charlotte ===
Charlotte 49ers at SMU Mustangs – Game summary

Quarter	1	2	3	4	Total
49ers	0	3	6	7	16
Mustangs	14	3	10	7	34

at Gerald J. Ford Stadium, University Park, Texas

- Date: September 30
- Game time: 6:30 p.m. CDT
- Game weather: Sunny, 92 °F (33 °C)
- Game attendance: 25,385
- Referee: Kevin Randall
- TV announcers (ESPNU): John Schriffen, Rocky Boiman, and Dawn Davenport
- Box score, Recap

Game information
First quarter
- SMU – Roderick Daniels Jr. 12-yard pass from Preston Stone (Collin Rogers kick), 11:41. Mustangs 7–0. Drive: 10 plays, 82 yards, 3:15.
- SMU – Jaylan Knighton 1-yard run (Collin Rogers kick), 4:46. Mustangs 14–0. Drive: 4 plays, 15 yards, 1:54.

Second quarter

- CLT – Jake Larson 21-yard field goal, 8:20. Mustangs 14–3. Drive: 10 plays, 66 yards, 5:48.
- SMU – Collin Rogers 22-yard field goal, 3:53. Mustangs 17–3. Drive: 12 plays, 57 yards, 3:46.

Third quarter

- SMU – Jaylan Knighton 95-yard run (Collin Rogers kick), 12:53. Mustangs 24–3. Drive: 1 play, 95 yards, 0:14.
- SMU – Collin Rogers 33-yard field goal, 7:40. Mustangs 27–3. Drive: 10 plays, 26 yards, 3:34.
- CLT – Jack Hestera 3-yard pass from Trexler Ivey (pass failed), 1:25. Mustangs 27–9. Drive: 13 plays, 75 yards, 6:15.

Fourth quarter

- CLT – Trexler Ivey 1-yard run (Jake Larson kick), 6:23. Mustangs 27–16. Drive: 14 plays, 74 yards, 6:29.
- SMU – R. J. Maryland 23-yard pass from Preston Stone (Collin Rogers kick), 4:18. Mustangs 34–16. Drive: 7 plays, 44 yards, 2:04.

Statistics	CLT	SMU
First downs	23	19
Total yards	331	363
Rushing yards	167	228
Passing yards	164	135
Turnovers	1	1
Time of possession	35:25	24:35

Team	Category	Player	Statistics
Charlotte	Passing	Trexler Ivey	10/17, 107 yards, TD, INT
Charlotte	Rushing	Terron Kellman	9 rushes, 69 yards
Charlotte	Receiving	Jack Hestera	7 receptions, 81 yards, TD
SMU	Passing	Preston Stone	14/23, 135 yards, 2 TD, INT
SMU	Rushing	Jaylan Knighton	11 rushes, 150 yards, 2 TD
SMU	Receiving	Jake Bailey	3 receptions, 34 yards

SMU defeated Charlotte 34–16. Former President George W. Bush attended the game and participated in the coin toss.

=== At East Carolina ===
SMU Mustangs at East Carolina Pirates – Game summary

Quarter	1	2	3	4	Total
Mustangs	14	0	0	17	31
Pirates	0	10	0	0	10

at Dowdy–Ficklen Stadium, Greenville, North Carolina

- Date: October 12
- Game time: 6:30 p.m. CDT/7:30 p.m. EDT
- Game weather: Cloudy, 62 °F (17 °C)
- Game attendance: 33,444
- Referee: Luke Richmond
- TV announcers (ESPN): Matt Barrie, Dan Mullen, and Harry Lyles Jr.
- Box score, Recap

Game information
First quarter
- SMU – Keyshawn Smith 21-yard pass from Preston Stone (Collin Rogers kick), 7:09. Mustangs 7–0. Drive: 6 plays, 69 yards, 2:16.
- SMU – Roderick Daniels Jr. 24-yard pass from Preston Stone (Collin Rogers kick), 5:04. Mustangs 14–0. Drive: 3 plays, 74 yards, 1:02.

Second quarter

- ECU – Andrew Conrad 49-yard field goal, 13:40. Mustangs 14–3. Drive: 14 plays, 44 yards, 6:24.
- ECU – Mason Garcia 6-yard run (Andrew Conrad kick), 2:47. Mustangs 14–10. Drive: 12 plays, 81 yards, 6:36.

Third quarter

- No scoring plays

Fourth quarter

- SMU – Collin Rogers 50-yard field goal, 13:18. Mustangs 17–10. Drive: 4 plays, -1 yards, 0:59.
- SMU – Jonathan McGill 34-yard interception return (Collin Rogers kick), 7:22. Mustangs 24–10.
- SMU – R. J. Maryland 43-yard pass from Preston Stone (Collin Rogers kick), 2:29. Mustangs 31–10. Drive: 7 plays, 70 yards, 3:44.

Statistics	SMU	ECU
First downs	14	15
Total yards	333	290
Rushing yards	57	97
Passing yards	276	193
Turnovers	0	2
Time of possession	25:40	34:20

Team	Category	Player	Statistics
SMU	Passing	Preston Stone	19/38, 276 yards, 3 TD
SMU	Rushing	Jaylan Knighton	11 rushes, 26 yards
SMU	Receiving	Jordan Kerley	3 receptions, 69 yards
East Carolina	Passing	Mason Garcia	12/26, 155 yards
East Carolina	Rushing	Mason Garcia	12 rushes, 38 yards, TD
East Carolina	Receiving	Chase Sowell	7 receptions, 120 yards

=== At Temple ===
SMU Mustangs at Temple Owls – Game summary

Quarter	1	2	3	4	Total
Mustangs	14	10	17	14	55
Owls	0	0	0	0	0

at Lincoln Financial Field, Philadelphia, Pennsylvania

- Date: October 20
- Game time: 6:00 p.m. CDT/7:00 p.m. EDT
- Game weather: Sunny, 63 °F (17 °C)
- Game attendance: 11,232
- Referee: Tim Rich
- TV announcers (ESPN): Anish Shroff, Andre Ware, and Paul Carcaterra
- Box score, Recap

Game information
First quarter
- SMU – Jaylan Knighton 3-yard run (Collin Rogers kick), 4:31. Mustangs 7–0. Drive: 8 plays, 90 yards, 2:42.
- SMU – Jordan Hudson 4-yard pass from Preston Stone (Collin Rogers kick), 1:32. Mustangs 14–0. Drive: 5 plays, 58 yards, 1:52.

Second quarter

- SMU – R. J. Maryland 2-yard pass from Preston Stone (Collin Rogers kick), 11:43. Mustangs 21–0. Drive: 9 plays, 59 yards, 3:34.
- SMU – Collin Rogers 25-yard field goal, 0:02. Mustangs 24–0. Drive: 12 plays, 65 yards, 1:38.

Third quarter

- SMU – Roderick Daniels Jr. 67-yard punt return (Collin Rogers kick), 11:43. Mustangs 31–0.
- SMU – Preston Stone 21-yard run (Collin Rogers kick), 10:00. Mustangs 38–0. Drive: 5 plays, 58 yards, 1:56.
- SMU – Collin Rogers 47-yard field goal, 1:17. Mustangs 41–0. Drive: 11 plays, 50 yards, 4:25.

Fourth quarter

- SMU – Jordan Hudson 7-yard pass from Kevin Jennings (Collin Rogers kick), 10:52. Mustangs 48–0. Drive: 9 plays, 62 yards, 3:56.
- SMU – Kevin Jennings 5-yard run (Collin Rogers kick), 7:35. Mustangs 55–0. Drive: 7 plays, 33 yards, 2:24.

Statistics	SMU	TEM
First downs	36	12
Total yards	563	131
Rushing yards	205	24
Passing yards	358	107
Turnovers	1	1
Time of possession	35:02	24:58

Team	Category	Player	Statistics
SMU	Passing	Preston Stone	23/36, 300 yards, 2 TD
SMU	Rushing	Jaylan Knighton	15 rushes, 64 yards, TD
SMU	Receiving	Romello Brinson	5 receptions, 87 yards
Temple	Passing	Forrest Brock	7/15, 60 yards, INT
Temple	Rushing	Joquez Smith	4 rushes, 19 yards
Temple	Receiving	Zae Baines	2 receptions, 27 yards

=== Tulsa ===
Tulsa Golden Hurricane at SMU Mustangs – Game summary

Quarter	1	2	3	4	Total
Golden Hurricane	3	0	0	7	10
Mustangs	28	24	14	3	69

at Gerald J. Ford Stadium, University Park, Texas

- Date: October 28
- Game time: 11:00 a.m. CST
- Game weather: Rain, 60 °F (16 °C)
- Game attendance: 20,800
- Referee: Kevin Randall
- TV announcers (ESPNU): John Schriffen, Rocky Boiman, and Dawn Davenport
- Box score, Recap

Game information
First quarter
- SMU – Romello Brinson 74-yard pass from Preston Stone (Collin Rogers kick), 14:10. Mustangs 7–0. Drive: 2 plays, 75 yards, 0:45.
- SMU – Tyler Lavine 1-yard run (Collin Rogers kick), 9:34. Mustangs 14–0. Drive: 6 plays, 41 yards, 1:51.
- TLSA – Chase Meyer 35-yard field goal, 4:44. Mustangs 14–3. Drive: 11 plays, 58 yards, 4:50.
- SMU – Jaylan Knighton 11-yard run (Collin Rogers kick), 1:46. Mustangs 21–3. Drive: 8 plays, 72 yards, 2:52.
- SMU – Isaiah Nwokobia 25-yard interception return (Collin Rogers kick), 0:26. Mustangs 28–3.

Second quarter

- SMU – Collin Rogers 42-yard field goal, 12:07. Mustangs 31–3. Drive: 7 plays, 56 yards, 1:30.
- SMU – RJ Maryland 62-yard pass from Preston Stone (Collin Rogers kick), 11:35. Mustangs 38–3. Drive: 1 play, 62 yards, 0:10.
- SMU – Camar Wheaton 4-yard run (Collin Rogers kick), 7:34. Mustangs 45–3. Drive: 7 plays, 80 yards, 2:07.
- SMU – Moochie Dixon 17-yard pass from Preston Stone (Collin Rogers kick), 4:37. Mustangs 52–3. Drive: 6 plays, 58 yards, 1:41.

Third quarter

- SMU – Velton Gardner 1-yard run (Collin Rogers kick), 8:21. Mustangs 59–3. Drive: 12 plays, 70 yards, 5:49.
- SMU – Camar Wheaton 48-yard field goal, 3:50. Mustangs 66–3. Drive: 4 plays, 66 yards, 2:03.

Fourth quarter

- TLSA – Kamdyn Benjamin 5-yard pass from Cardell Williams (Chase Meyer kick), 9:59. Mustangs 66–10. Drive: 12 plays, 68 yards, 4:52.
- SMU – Collin Rogers 22-yard field goal, 2:24. Mustangs 69–10. Drive: 8 plays, 54 yards, 5:07.

Statistics	TLSA	SMU
First downs	14	26
Total yards	247	638
Rushing yards	123	192
Passing yards	124	446
Turnovers	2	0
Time of possession	30:13	29:47

Team	Category	Player	Statistics
Tulsa	Passing	Braylon Braxton	10/20, 92 yards, 2 INT
Tulsa	Rushing	Anthony Watkins	15 rushes, 50 yards
Tulsa	Receiving	Devan Williams	3 receptions, 57 yards
SMU	Passing	Preston Stone	15/20, 371 yards, 3 TD
SMU	Rushing	Camar Wheaton	9 rushes, 80 yards, 2 TD
SMU	Receiving	RJ Maryland	2 receptions, 95 yards, TD

SMU defeated Tulsa 69–10, attaining bowl eligibility. They scored over 50 points in the first half, doing so for the first time since their 77–63 victory over Houston the previous season.

=== At Rice ===
SMU Mustangs at Rice Owls – Game summary

Quarter	1	2	3	4	Total
Mustangs	14	10	9	3	36
Owls	7	14	7	3	31

at Rice Stadium, Houston, Texas

- Date: November 4
- Game time: 6:30 p.m. CDT
- Game weather: Sunny, 75 °F (24 °C)
- Game attendance: 21,632
- Referee: Scott Hardin
- TV announcers (ESPNU): John Schriffen, Charles Arbuckle, and Dawn Davenport
- Box score, Recap

Game information
First quarter
- RICE – Chike Anigbogu 15-yard punt return (Tim Horn kick), 8:56. Owls 7–0.
- SMU – Roderick Daniels Jr. 34-yard pass from Preston Stone (Collin Rogers kick), 6:22. Tied 7–7. Drive: 7 plays, 75 yards, 2:34.
- SMU – Preston Stone 20-yard run (Collin Rogers kick), 5:48. Mustangs 14–7. Drive: 2 plays, 33 yards, 0:29.

Second quarter

- RICE – Luke McCaffrey 4-yard pass from JT Daniels (Tim Horn kick), 11:07. Tied 14–14. Drive: 9 plays, 69 yards, 4:24.
- SMU – Collin Rogers 41-yard field goal, 6:59. Mustangs 17–14. Drive: 9 plays, 51 yards, 4:08.
- SMU – Jordan Hudson 30-yard pass from Preston Stone (Collin Rogers kick), 2:09. Mustangs 24–14. Drive: 7 plays, 89 yards, 2:16.
- RICE – Dean Connors 14-yard pass from JT Daniels (Tim Horn kick), 0:18. Mustangs 24–21. Drive: 4 plays, 39 yards, 1:41.

Third quarter

- SMU – Tyler Lavine 3-yard run (pass failed), 9:32. Mustangs 30–21. Drive: 7 plays, 60 yards, 3:20.
- SMU – Collin Rogers 37-yard field goal, 3:05. Mustangs 33–21. Drive: 10 plays, 52 yards, 3:32.
- RICE – Dean Connors 1-yard run (Tim Horn kick), 0:23. Mustangs 33–28. Drive: 8 plays, 75 yards, 2:42.

Fourth quarter

- RICE – Tim Horn 32-yard field goal, 7:44. Mustangs 33–31. Drive: 6 plays, 66 yards, 4:14.
- SMU – Collin Rogers 51-yard field goal, 2:49. Mustangs 36–31. Drive: 12 plays, 41 yards, 4:55.

Statistics	SMU	RICE
First downs	28	13
Total yards	477	290
Rushing yards	223	124
Passing yards	254	166
Turnovers	1	3
Time of possession	31:31	28:29

Team	Category	Player	Statistics
SMU	Passing	Preston Stone	15/28, 217 yards, 2 TD
SMU	Rushing	Preston Stone	8 rushes, 81 yards, TD
SMU	Receiving	Jake Bailey	4 receptions, 73 yards
Rice	Passing	Chase Jenkins	10/16, 85 yards, INT
Rice	Rushing	Dean Connors	7 rushes, 77 yards, TD
Rice	Receiving	Rawson MacNeill	2 receptions, 68 yards

SMU defeated Rice 36–31, winning the Mayor's Cup. SMU quarterback Preston Stone and Rice quarterback JT Daniels both suffered from concussions during the game. Stone's concussion put his start against UNT the next week into question, while Daniels did not play again for the rest of the season, announcing his retirement after its conclusion.

=== North Texas ===
North Texas Mean Green at SMU Mustangs – Game summary

Quarter	1	2	3	4	Total
Mean Green	7	7	0	7	21
Mustangs	14	3	14	14	45

at Gerald J. Ford Stadium, University Park, Texas

- Date: November 10
- Game time: 8:00 p.m. CST
- Game weather: Cloudy, 57 °F (14 °C)
- Game attendance: 22,043
- Referee: Nate Black
- TV announcers (ESPN2): Anish Shroff, Andre Ware, and Paul Carcaterra
- Box score, Recap

Game information
First quarter
- SMU – Moochie Dixon 8-yard pass from Preston Stone (Collin Rogers kick), 11:39. Mustangs 7–0. Drive: 6 plays, 68 yards, 2:05.
- UNT – Trey Cleveland 19-yard pass from Chandler Rogers (Noah Rauschenberg kick), 4:47. Tied 7–7. Drive: 10 plays, 80 yards, 3:50.
- SMU – RJ Maryland 24-yard pass from Preston Stone (Collin Rogers kick), 0:34. Mustangs 14–7. Drive: 10 plays, 75 yards, 4:13.

Second quarter

- SMU – Collin Rogers 20-yard field goal, 10:29. Mustangs 17–7. Drive: 12 plays, 72 yards, 3:42.
- UNT – Oscar Adaway III 7-yard run (Noah Rauschenberg kick), 7:07. Mustangs 17–14. Drive: 8 plays, 75 yards, 3:22.

Third quarter

- SMU – Tyler Lavine 5-yard run (Collin Rogers kick), 11:08. Mustangs 24–14. Drive: 3 plays, 17 yards, 0:51.
- SMU – Jaylan Knighton 20-yard run (Collin Rogers kick), 2:15. Mustangs 31–14. Drive: 4 plays, 55 yards, 1:29.

Fourth quarter

- SMU – Camar Wheaton 22-yard run (Collin Rogers kick), 12:44. Mustangs 38–14. Drive: 3 plays, 77 yards, 1:02.
- SMU – LJ Johnson Jr. 3-yard run (Collin Rogers kick), 4:00. Mustangs 45–14. Drive: 10 plays, 70 yards, 6:38.
- UNT – Blair Conwright 29-yard pass from Chandler Rogers (Noah Rauschenberg kick), 1:27. Mustangs 45–21. Drive: 7 plays, 68 yards, 2:28.

Statistics	UNT	SMU
First downs	18	28
Total yards	372	552
Rushing yards	132	318
Passing yards	240	234
Turnovers	2	1
Time of possession	26:34	33:26

Team	Category	Player	Statistics
North Texas	Passing	Chandler Rogers	18/31, 240 yards, 2 TD, INT
North Texas	Rushing	Oscar Adaway III	11 rushes, 90 yards, TD
North Texas	Receiving	Trey Cleveland	3 receptions, 72 yards, TD
SMU	Passing	Preston Stone	11/20, 234 yards, 2 TD, INT
SMU	Rushing	Jaylan Knighton	17 rushes, 129 yards, TD
SMU	Receiving	Moochie Dixon	3 receptions, 99 yards, TD

Quarterback Stone cleared concussion protocol prior to the game against UNT, allowing him to lead the team to a 45–21 victory in the Safeway Bowl.

=== At Memphis ===
SMU Mustangs at Memphis Tigers – Game summary

Quarter	1	2	3	4	Total
Mustangs	7	7	14	10	38
Tigers	10	3	8	13	34

at Simmons Bank Liberty Stadium, Memphis, Tennessee

- Date: November 18
- Game time: 11:00 a.m. CST
- Game weather: Sunny, 55 °F (13 °C)
- Game attendance: 30,313
- Referee: Luke Richmond
- TV announcers (ESPN2): Beth Mowins, Kirk Morrison, and Stormy Buonantony
- Box score, Recap

Game information
First quarter
- SMU – R. J. Maryland 43-yard pass from Preston Stone (Collin Rogers kick), 12:16. Mustangs 7–0. Drive: 4 plays, 48 yards, 1:24.
- MEM – Tanner Gillis 47-yard field goal, 7:25. Mustangs 7–3. Drive: 11 plays, 46 yards, 4:51.
- MEM – Demeer Blankumsee 27-yard pass from Seth Henigan (Tanner Gillis kick), 0:56. Memphis 10–7. Drive: 10 plays, 80 yards, 5:19.

Second quarter

- SMU – Preston Stone 1-yard run (Collin Rogers kick), 6:07. Mustangs 14–10. Drive: 13 plays, 70 yards, 6:04.
- MEM – Tanner Gillis 36-yard field goal, 0:46. Mustangs 14–13. Drive: 12 plays, 70 yards, 5:15.

Third quarter

- SMU – L. J. Johnson Jr. 1-yard run (Collin Rogers kick), 9:35. Mustangs 21–13. Drive: 13 plays, 80 yards, 5:21.
- MEM – Brandon Thomas 1-yard run (Seth Henigan pass to Anthony Landphere), 4:27. Tied 21–21. Drive: 10 plays, 75 yards, 5:08.
- SMU – Jaylan Knighton 1-yard run (Collin Rogers kick), 3:17. Mustangs 28–21. Drive: 4 plays, 75 yards, 1:10.

Fourth quarter

- MEM – Blake Watson 11-yard run (Tanner Gillis kick), 14:55. Tied 28–28. Drive: 8 plays, 75 yards, 3:22.
- SMU – Collin Rogers 32-yard field goal, 12:25. Mustangs 31–28. Drive: 6 plays, 60 yards, 2:30.
- SMU – Jordan Hudson 7-yard pass from Preston Stone (Collin Rogers kick), 2:41. Mustangs 38–28. Drive: 9 plays, 73 yards, 4:53.
- MEM – Demeer Blankumsee 20-yard pass from Seth Henigan (kick failed), 0:53. Mustangs 38–34. Drive: 10 plays, 70 yards, 1:44.

Statistics	SMU	MEM
First downs	23	24
Total yards	444	464
Rushing yards	158	62
Passing yards	286	402
Turnovers	0	1
Time of possession	28:10	31:50

Team	Category	Player	Statistics
SMU	Passing	Preston Stone	15/23, 286 yards, 2 TD
SMU	Rushing	L. J. Johnson Jr.	21 rushes, 115 yards, TD
SMU	Receiving	Keyshawn Smith	3 receptions, 63 yards
Memphis	Passing	Seth Henigan	35/51, 402 yards, 2 TD
Memphis	Rushing	Blake Watson	10 rushes, 41 yards, TD
Memphis	Receiving	Roc Taylor	8 receptions, 146 yards

Both SMU and Memphis were undefeated in conference play prior to the game, meaning the loser would likely be eliminated from contention to play in the conference championship. SMU defeated Memphis 38–34.

=== Navy ===
Navy Midshipmen at SMU Mustangs – Game summary

Quarter	1	2	3	4	Total
Midshipmen	7	7	0	0	14
Mustangs	28	24	7	0	59

at Gerald J. Ford Stadium, University Park, Texas

- Date: November 25
- Game time: 11:00 a.m. CST
- Game weather: Sunny, 55 °F (13 °C)
- Game attendance: 21,490
- Referee: Tim Rich
- TV announcers (ESPN2): Roy Philpott, Roddy Jones, and Taylor McGregor
- Box score, Recap

Game information
First quarter
- SMU – Tyler Lavine 1-yard run (Collin Rogers kick), 13:09. Mustangs 7–0. Drive: 5 plays, 67 yards, 1:45.
- SMU – Moochie Dixon 15-yard pass from Preston Stone (Collin Rogers kick), 8:57. Mustangs 14–0. Drive: 5 plays, 80 yards, 1:59.
- SMU – Jordan Hudson 27-yard pass from Preston Stone (Collin Rogers kick), 5:26. Mustangs 21–0. Drive: 7 plays, 78 yards, 2:08.
- SMU – Moochie Dixon 26-yard pass from Preston Stone (Collin Rogers kick), 1:57. Mustangs 28–0. Drive: 4 plays, 67 yards, 1:51.
- NAVY – Daba Fofana 1-yard run (Nathan Kirkwood kick), 0:56. Mustangs 28–7. Drive: 1 play, 1 yard, 0:04.

Second quarter

- SMU – Willie Benton IV 0-yard fumble return (Collin Rogers kick), 11:42. Mustangs 35–7.
- SMU – Tyler Lavine 8-yard run (Collin Rogers kick), 9:32. Mustangs 42–7. Drive: 7 plays, 57 yards, 2:41.
- SMU – Tyler Lavine 19-yard run (Collin Rogers kick), 4:59. Mustangs 49–7. Drive: 7 plays, 55 yards, 2:53.
- NAVY – Braxton Woodson 69-yard run (Nathan Kirkwood kick), 4:10. Mustangs 49–14. Drive: 2 plays, 75 yards, 0:49.
- SMU – Collin Rogers 30-yard field goal, 0:41. Mustangs 52–14. Drive: 10 plays, 61 yards, 3:29.

Third quarter

- SMU – Isaiah Nwokobia 74-yard interception return (Collin Rogers kick), 9:31. Mustangs 59–14.

Fourth quarter

- No scoring plays

Statistics	NAVY	SMU
First downs	14	21
Total yards	253	487
Rushing yards	182	118
Passing yards	71	369
Turnovers	2	1
Time of possession	32:04	27:56

Team	Category	Player	Statistics
Navy	Passing	Braxton Woodson	9/18, 71 yards, INT
Navy	Rushing	Braxton Woodson	18 rushes, 104 yards, TD
Navy	Receiving	Alex Tecza	3 receptions, 34 yards
SMU	Passing	Preston Stone	14/19, 322 yards, 3 TD
SMU	Rushing	Tyler Lavine	7 rushes, 49 yards, 3 TD
SMU	Receiving	Moochie Dixon	4 receptions, 125 yards, 2 TD

SMU defeated Navy 59–14 to win the Gansz Trophy and guarantee a spot in the conference championship game. SMU scored over 50 points in the first half, and quarterback Preston Stone threw for the most yards in the first quarter of an FBS game since 2019, but he suffered a broken leg late in the first half, leaving him unable to play for the rest of the season.

=== At No. 22 Tulane (AAC Championship Game) ===
SMU Mustangs at No. 22 Tulane Green Wave (AAC Championship Game) – Game summary

Quarter	1	2	3	4	Total
Mustangs	7	7	3	9	26
No. 22 Green Wave	7	0	7	0	14

at Yulman Stadium, New Orleans, Louisiana

- Date: December 2
- Game time: 4:00 p.m. CST
- Game weather: Rain, 72 °F (22 °C)
- Game attendance: 25,206
- Referee: Luke Richmond
- TV announcers (ABC): Roy Philpott, Roddy Jones, and Taylor McGregor
- Box score, Recap

Game information
First quarter
- TULN – Michael Pratt 1-yard run (Valentino Ambrosio kick), 14:50. Green Wave 7–0. Drive: 1 play, 1 yard, 0:03.
- SMU – Jaylan Knighton 6-yard run (Collin Rogers kick), 7:37. Tied 7–7. Drive: 5 plays, 50 yards, 1:37.

Second quarter

- SMU – Key'Shawn Smith 17-yard pass from Kevin Jennings (Collin Rogers kick), 1:32. Mustangs 14–7. Drive: 10 plays, 65 yards, 4:18.

Third quarter

- TULN – Yulkeith Brown 42-yard pass from Michael Pratt (Valentino Ambrosio kick), 8:46. Tied 14–14. Drive: 5 plays, 63 yards, 2:34.
- SMU – Collin Rogers 48-yard field goal, 5:35. Mustangs 17–14. Drive: 7 plays, 41 yards, 3:11.

Fourth quarter

- SMU – Collin Rogers 32-yard field goal, 12:38. Mustangs 20–14. Drive: 11 plays, 52 yards, 5:52.
- SMU – Collin Rogers 32-yard field goal, 8:58. Mustangs 23–14. Drive: 5 plays, 15 yards, 1:47.
- SMU – Collin Rogers 45-yard field goal, 3:15. Mustangs 26–14. Drive: 6 plays, 9 yards, 1:13.

Statistics	SMU	TULN
First downs	21	12
Total yards	396	269
Rushing yards	193	31
Passing yards	203	238
Turnovers	3	1
Time of possession	34:07	25:53

Team	Category	Player	Statistics
SMU	Passing	Kevin Jennings	19/33, 203 yards, TD, 2 INT
SMU	Rushing	Jaylan Knighton	15 rushes, 75 yards, TD
SMU	Receiving	R. J. Maryland	5 receptions, 56 yards
Tulane	Passing	Michael Pratt	21/36, 238 yards, TD, INT
Tulane	Rushing	Makhi Hughes	11 rushes, 44 yards
Tulane	Receiving	Yulkeith Brown	5 receptions, 90 yards, TD

Backup quarterback Kevin Jennings made his first career start against Tulane in the championship game. On the first play of the game, Jennings fumbled the ball, allowing Tulane to return it to the 1-yard line and score immediately afterwards. Despite this and two interceptions, SMU led Tulane 14–7 at the end of the first half thanks to its strong defense, which forced Tulane to punt the ball nine times over the course of the game. In the second half, Jennings continued to lead SMU down the field, allowing kicker Collin Rogers to score four field goals. Near the end of the fourth quarter, safety Isaiah Nwokobia intercepted the ball to seal SMU's 26–14 victory over Tulane, winning SMU its first conference championship since 1984. After the game, Nwokobia was awarded the Most Outstanding Player award, becoming the first defensive player to win such an award in an AAC title game.

=== Vs. Boston College (Fenway Bowl) ===
No. 24 SMU Mustangs vs. Boston College Eagles (Fenway Bowl) – Game summary

Quarter	1	2	3	4	Total
No. 24 Mustangs	0	14	0	0	14
Eagles	3	7	0	13	23

at Fenway Park, Boston, Massachusetts

- Date: December 28
- Game time: 10:00 a.m. CST/11:00 a.m. EST a.m.
- Game weather: Rain, 45 °F (7 °C)
- Game attendance: 16,238
- Referee: Kevin Mar
- TV announcers (ESPN): Chris Cotter, Mark Herzlich, and Sherree Burruss
- Box score, Recap

Game information
First quarter
- BC – Liam Connor 45-yard field goal, 6:21. Eagles 3–0. Drive: 8 plays, 25 yards, 3:42.

Second quarter

- SMU – L. J. Johnson Jr. 1-yard run (Collin Rogers kick), 9:14. Mustangs 7–3. Drive: 15 plays, 78 yards, 6:32.
- BC – Kye Robichaux 6-yard run (Liam Connor kick), 3:07. Eagles 10–7. Drive: 10 plays, 77 yards, 6:07.
- SMU – Jaylan Knighton 6-yard pass from Kevin Jennings (Collin Rogers kick), 0:08. Mustangs 14–10. Drive: 10 plays, 55 yards, 2:59.

Third quarter

- No scoring plays

Fourth quarter

- BC – Thomas Castellanos 15-yard run (Liam Connor kick), 12:22. Eagles 17–14. Drive: 8 plays, 72 yards, 3:59.
- BC – Thomas Castellanos 14-yard run (kick failed), 9:48. Eagles 23–14. Drive: 3 plays, 42 yards, 1:19.

Statistics	SMU	BC
First downs	22	20
Total yards	309	364
Rushing yards	118	262
Passing yards	191	102
Turnovers	1	1
Time of possession	29:00	31:00

Team	Category	Player	Statistics
SMU	Passing	Kevin Jennings	24/48, 191 yards, TD
SMU	Rushing	Kevin Jennings	10 rushes, 51 yards
SMU	Receiving	Jake Bailey	6 receptions, 54 yards
Boston College	Passing	Thomas Castellanos	11/18, 102 yards, INT
Boston College	Rushing	Thomas Castellanos	21 rushes, 156 yards, 2 TD
Boston College	Receiving	Jaeden Skeete	2 receptions, 40 yards
