= 2023 North Texas Mean Green football team =

American college football season

2023 North Texas Mean Green football
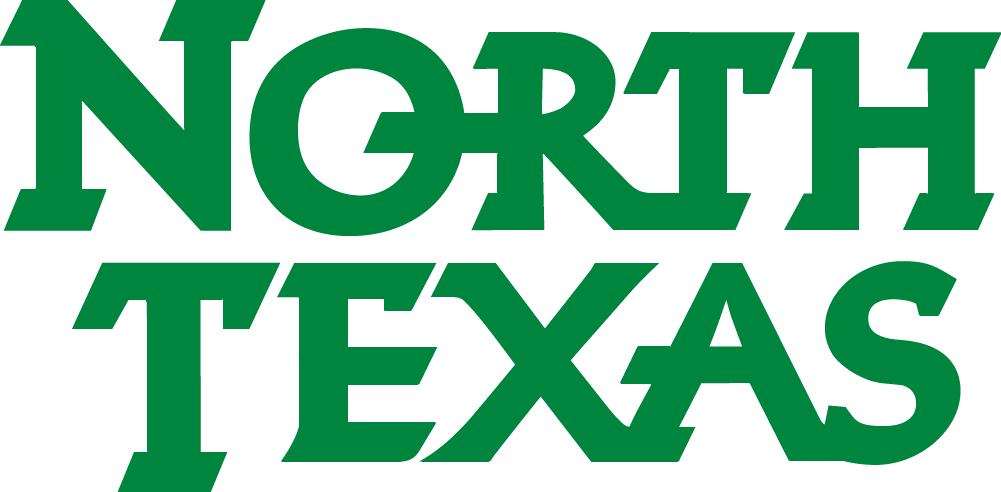
- Conference: American Athletic Conference
- Record: 5–7 (3–5 AAC)
- Head coach: Eric Morris (1st season)
- Offensive coordinator: Jordan Davis (1st season)
- Offensive scheme: Air raid
- Defensive coordinator: Matt Caponi (1st season)
- Base defense: 3–3–5
- Home stadium: DATCU Stadium

2023 American Athletic Conference football standings
	Conf.			Overall
Team	W		L	W		L
No. 22 SMU y$	8	–	0	11	–	3
Tulane y	8	–	0	11	–	3
UTSA	7	–	1	9	–	4
Memphis	6	–	2	10	–	3
South Florida	4	–	4	7	–	6
Rice	4	–	4	6	–	7
Navy	4	–	4	5	–	7
North Texas	3	–	5	5	–	7
UAB	3	–	5	4	–	8
Florida Atlantic	3	–	5	4	–	8
Charlotte	2	–	6	3	–	9
Tulsa	2	–	6	4	–	8
Temple	1	–	7	3	–	9
East Carolina	1	–	7	2	–	10
Championship: SMU 26, Tulane 14
$ – Conference champion; y – Championship game participant; Rankings from AP Poll

The 2023 North Texas Mean Green football team represented the University of North Texas as a member of American Athletic Conference (AAC) during the 2023 NCAA Division I FBS football season. Led by first-year head coach Eric Morris, the Mean Green compiled an overall record of 5–7 with a mark of 3–5 in conference play, placing in a three-way tie for eighth in the AAC. The team played home games at DATCU Stadium in Denton, Texas.

== Schedule ==
North Texas and the American Athletic Conference (AAC) announced the 2023 football schedule on February 21, 2023.

Date	Time	Opponent	Site	TV	Result	Attendance
September 2	3:00 p.m.	California*	DATCU Stadium; Denton, TX	ESPNU	L 21–58	21,350
September 9	5:30 p.m.	at FIU*	Riccardo Silva Stadium; Westchester, FL	ESPN+	L 39–46	15,754
September 16	6:00 p.m.	at Louisiana Tech*	Joe Aillet Stadium; Ruston, LA	ESPN+	W 40–37	17,434
September 30	6:00 p.m.	Abilene Christian*	DATCU Stadium; Denton, TX	ESPN+	W 45–31	21,494
October 7	2:30 p.m.	at Navy	Navy–Marine Corps Memorial Stadium; Annapolis, MD	CBSSN	L 24–27	28,648
October 14	11:00 a.m.	Temple	DATCU Stadium; Denton, TX	ESPNU	W 45–14	13,678
October 21	2:30 p.m.	at No. 23 Tulane	Yulman Stadium; New Orleans, LA	ESPN2	L 28–35	30,000
October 28	2:00 p.m.	Memphis^{†}	DATCU Stadium; Denton, TX	ESPN+	L 42–45	18,062
November 4	2:00 p.m.	UTSA	DATCU Stadium; Denton, TX	ESPN+	L 29–37	17,354
November 10	8:00 p.m.	at SMU	Gerald J. Ford Stadium; Dallas, TX (Safeway Bowl)	ESPN2	L 21–45	22,043
November 18	2:00 p.m.	at Tulsa	Skelly Field at H. A. Chapman Stadium; Tulsa, OK	ESPN+	W 35–28	16,520
November 25	1:00 p.m.	UAB	DATCU Stadium; Denton, TX	ESPN+	W 45–42	14,628
*Non-conference game; ^{†}Homecoming; Rankings from AP Poll and CFP Rankings released prior to game; All times are in Eastern time

== Offseason ==
=== Coaching changes ===
After seven seasons, on December 4, 2022, the Mean Green fired head coach Seth Littrell.

On December 13, 2022, the Mean Green hired Eric Morris to be their next head coach, he will be the team's 20th head coach. He was previously the offensive coordinator for Washington State.

On December 28, 2022, the Mean Green hired Chris Gilbert as their assistant head coach he will also coach the tight ends. Also on December 28 they added Drew Svoboda as their special teams coach and associate head coach, Patrick Cobbs as the running backs coach, and Sean Brophy as the quarterback's coach. Additionally, they hired Rolando Surita as their chief of staff.

The next day on December 29, 2022, the Mean Green made five hires. They hired Matt Caponi as their defensive coordinator and cornerback's coach, Jordan Davis as their offensive coordinator and wide receivers coach, and Colby Kratch as their linebacker's coach. They also named Bryan Kegans the Director of Strength & Conditioning, and Justin Owens as their Director of Recruiting.

And on December 30, 2022, the Mean Green made the last of their hirings naming Clay Jennings as their safeties coach and Demerick Gary as their defensive line coach.

== Game summaries ==
=== vs California ===
California Golden Bears (0–0) vs North Texas Mean Green (0–0) — Game summary

Quarter	1	2	3	4	Total
Golden Bears	14	19	15	10	58
Mean Green	7	14	0	0	21

at DATCU Stadium • Denton, TX

- Date: September 2, 2023
- Game time: 3:00 p.m.
- Game attendance: 21,350
- TV: ESPNU

Game information

First quarter

- (12:53) CAL - Jeremiah Hunter 23-yard pass from Sam Jackson V, Michael Luckhurst kick (Drive: 3 plays, 65 yards, 0:46; California 7-0)
- (11:04) UNT - Ja'Mori Maclin 3-yard pass from Stone Earle, Noah Rauschenberg kick (Drive: 5 plays, 75 yards, 1:49; Tied: 7-7)
- (1:04) CAL - Jaydn Ott 4-yard run, Michael Luckhurst kick (Drive: 4 plays, 14 yards, 1:39; California 14-7)

Second quarter

- (14:33) UNT - Ja'Mori Maclin 59-yard pass from Stone Earle, Noah Rauschenberg kick (Drive: 5 plays, 75 yards, 1:31; Tied 14-14)
- (7:30) CAL - Isaiah Ifanse 26-yard run, Michael Luckhurst kick (Drive: 7 plays, 44 yards, 2:21; California 21-14)
- (5:42) CAL - Jaydn Ott 66-yard run, Michael Luckhurst kick blocked (Drive: 2 plays, 75 yards, 0:29; California 27-14)
- (1:47) UNT - Xzavior Kautai 12-yard pass from Stone Earle, Noah Rauschenberg kick (Drive: 3 plays, 24 yards, 1:04; California 27-21)
- (0:07) CAL - Isaiah Ifanse 8-yard run, two-point pass conversion failed (Drive: 9 plays, 75 yards, 1:40; California 33-21)

Third quarter

- Isaiah Ifanse 1-yard run, Ben Finley pass to Jack Endries for two-point conversion (Drive: 9 plays, 75 yards, 3:36; California 41-21)
- Taj Davis 4-yard pass from Ben Finley, Michael Luckhurst kick (Drive: 8 plays, 32 yards, 3:15; California 48-21)

Fourth quarter

- Ashton Stredick 5-yard run, Michael Luckhurst kick (Drive: 7 plays, 57 yards, 3:14; California 55-21)
- Michael Luckhurst 31-yard field goal (Drive: 9 plays, 23 yards, 4:18; California 58-21)

Statistics	CAL	UNT
First downs	29	9
Plays–yards	95-679	53-225
Rushes–yards	56-357	27-41
Passing yards	322	184
Passing: comp–att–int	27-39-1	15-26-3
Time of possession	39:07	20:53

Team	Category	Player	Statistics
California	Passing	Ben Finley	24/34, 289 yards, TD, INT
California	Rushing	Jaydn Ott	20 carries, 188 yards, 2 TD
California	Receiving	Jeremiah Hunter	6 receptions, 64 yards, TD
North Texas	Passing	Stone Earle	12/19, 174 yards, 3 TD, 2 INT
North Texas	Rushing	Isaiah Johnson	6 carries, 34 yards
North Texas	Receiving	Ja'Mori Maclin	4 receptions, 122 yards, 2 TD

=== at FIU ===
North Texas Mean Green (0-1) at FIU Panthers (1-1) – Game Summary

Quarter	1	2	3	4	Total
Mean Green	10	10	7	12	39
Panthers	7	10	21	8	46

at Riccardo Silva Stadium • Westchester, Florida

- Date: September 9th
- Game time: 6:30 p.m. EST/3:30 p.m. PST
- Game attendance: 15,754
- TV announcers (ESPN+): TBD

Game information

First quarter

Second quarter

Third quarter

Fourth quarter

Statistics	North Texas	Florida International
First downs		
Plays–yards		
Rushes–yards		
Passing yards		
Passing: comp–att–int		
Time of possession		

Team	Category	Player	Statistics
North Texas	Passing		
North Texas	Rushing		
North Texas	Receiving		
Florida International	Passing		
Florida International	Rushing		
Florida International	Receiving		

=== at Louisiana Tech ===
	1	2	3	4	Total
Mean Green	10	13	7	10	40
Bulldogs	0	14	0	23	37

Statistics	UNT	LT
First downs	32	21
Total yards	562	432
Rushing yards	249	215
Passing yards	313	217
Turnovers	1	1
Time of possession	33:24	26:36

Team	Category	Player	Statistics
North Texas	Passing	Chandler Rogers	24/40, 313 yards, 2 TD
North Texas	Rushing	Ayo Adeyi	19 rushes, 148 yards, 2 TD
North Texas	Receiving	Roderic Burns	11 receptions, 134 yards
Louisiana Tech	Passing	Jack Turner	9/13, 145 yards, TD
Louisiana Tech	Rushing	Tyre Shelton	16 rushes, 152 yards, TD
Louisiana Tech	Receiving	Cyrus Allen	5 receptions, 82 yards, TD

=== at Navy ===
North Texas Mean Green (2-2) vs. Navy Midshipmen (1-3) – Game summary

Quarter	1	2	3	4	Total
Mean Green	3	7	0	14	24
Midshipmen	0	13	7	7	27

at Navy-Marine Corps Memorial Stadium • Annapolis, Maryland

- Date: October 7th
- Game time: 2:30 p.m. CDT
- Game weather: Temperature: 64 °F (18 °C) • Wind: W at 5 miles per hour (8.0 km/h) • Weather: Cloudy
- Game attendance: 28,648
- Referee: Tim Rich
- TV announcers (CBSSN): John Sadack (play-by-play), Randy Cross (analyst) & Sheehan Stanwick Burch (sideline)

Game information

First quarter

- (2:43) UNT – Noah Rauschenberg 42-yard field goal (Drive: 9 plays, 68 yards, 4:11; North Texas 3-0)

Second quarter

- (7:18) NAVY – Alex Tecza 39-yard run, Nathan Kirkwood kick (Drive: 10 plays, 80 yards, 5:15; Navy 7-3)
- (2:42) UNT – Chandler Rogers 75-yard run, Noah Rauschenberg kick (Drive: 2 plays, 80 yards, 0:37; North Texas 10-7)

Third quarter

- (0:43) NAVY – Nathan Kent 26-yard pass from Tai Lavatai, Nathan Kirkwood missed PAT (Drive: 8 plays, 75 yards, 1:59; Navy 13-10)

Third Quarter

- (8:26) NAVY – Anton Hall 1-yard run, Nathan Kirkwood kick (Drive: 12 plays, 75 yards, 6:34; Navy 20-10)

Fourth quarter

- (13:01) UNT – Ja'Mori Maclin 18-yard pass from Chandler Rogers, Noah Rauschenberg kick (Drive: 14 plays, 93 yards, 4:57; Navy 20-17)
- (7:07) Navy – Alex Tecza 21-yard run, Nathan Kirkwood (Drive: 1 play, 21 yards, 0:06; Navy 27-17)
- (5:23) UNT – Ayo Adeyi 47-yard run, Noah Rauschenberg kick (Drive: 8 plays, 73 yards, 1:44; Navy 27-24)

Statistics	North Texas	Navy
First downs	23	21
Plays–yards	69–473	68–406
Rushes–yards	36–206	58–331
Passing yards	267	75
Passing: comp–att–int	22–33–0	4–10–0
Time of possession	26:05	33:55

Team	Category	Player	Statistics
North Texas	Passing	Chandler Rogers	22–32–0, 267 yards, TD
North Texas	Rushing	Ayo Adeyi	14 carries, 125 yards, TD
North Texas	Receiving	Ja'Mori Maclin	6 receptions, 76 yards, TD
Navy	Passing	Tai Lavatai	4–8–0, 75 yards, TD
Navy	Rushing	Alex Tecza	17 carries, 137 yards, 2 TD
Navy	Receiving	Brandon Chatman	1 reception, 38 yards

=== at No. 23 Tulane ===
North Texas Mean Green (3–3) vs No. 23 Tulane Green Wave (5–1) – Game summary

Quarter	1	2	3	4	Total
Mean Green	0	0	21	7	28
No. 23 Green Wave	7	14	7	7	35

at Yulman Stadium, New Orleans, LA

- Date: October 21, 2023
- Game time: 2:30 p.m. CDT
- Game weather: Sunny • Temperature: 85 °F (29 °C) • Wind: SE 6 mph
- Game attendance: 30,000
- Referee: Nate Black
- TV announcers (ESPN2): Beth Mowins (play-by-play), Kirk Morrison (color), Stormy Buonantony (sideline)

Game information

First Quarter

- (9:34) TUL – Alex Bauman 2-yard pass from Michael Pratt, Valentino Ambrosio kick (Drive: 6 plays, 53 yards, 2:58; Tulane 7–0)

Second Quarter

- (5:12) TUL – Makhi Hughes 10-yard run, Valentino Ambrosio kick (Drive: 8 plays, 48 yards, 3:33; Tulane 14–0)
- (0:17) TUL – Lawrence Keys III 23-yard pass from Michael Pratt, Valentino Ambrosio kick (Drive: 5 plays, 73 yards, 0:41; Tulane 21–0)

Third Quarter

- (10:20) UNT – Ja'Mori Maclin 7-yard pass from Chandler Rogers, Noah Rauschenberg kick (Drive: 9 plays, 88 yards, 2:49; Tulane 21–7)
- (4:39) TUL – Alex Bauman 21-yard pass from Michael Pratt, Valentino Ambrosio kick (Drive: 10 plays, 75 yards, 5:41; Tulane 28–7)
- (3:05) UNT – Ayo Adeyi 18-yard run, Noah Rauschenberg kick (Drive: 4 plays, 75 yards, 1:34; Tulane 28–14)
- (0:17) UNT – Oscar Adaway III 1-yard run, Noah Rauschenberg kick (Drive: 8 plays, 53 yards, 2:47; Tulane 28–21)

Fourth Quarter

- (9:08) UNT – Landon Sides 6-yard pass from Chandler Rogers, Noah Rauschenberg kick (Drive: 10 plays, 65 yards, 4:35; Tied 28–28)
- (2:34) TUL – Michael Pratt 19-yard run, Valentino Ambrosio kick (Drive: 13 plays, 75 yards, 6:34; Tulane 35–28)

Statistics	UNT	TUL
First downs	23	24
Total yards	426	439
Rushing yards	83	245
Passing yards	343	194
Turnovers	1	2
Time of possession	27:24	32:36

Team	Category	Player	Statistics
North Texas	Passing	Chandler Rogers	35/51, 343 yards, 2 TD
North Texas	Rushing	Chandler Rogers	8 carries, 34 yards
North Texas	Receiving	Ja'Mori Maclin	8 receptions, 71 yards, 1 TD
Tulane	Passing	Michael Pratt	15/21, 194 yards, 3 TD, 1 INT
Tulane	Rushing	Makhi Hughes	20 carries, 121 yards, 1 TD
Tulane	Receiving	Lawrence Keys III	5 receptions, 78 yards, 1 TD

=== vs UTSA ===
	1	2	3	4	Total
Roadrunners	10	17	3	7	37
Mean Green	0	13	0	16	29

=== at SMU ===
North Texas Mean Green at SMU Mustangs – Game summary

Quarter	1	2	3	4	Total
Mean Green	7	7	0	7	21
Mustangs	14	3	14	14	45

at Gerald J. Ford Stadium, University Park, Texas

- Date: November 10
- Game time: 8:00 p.m. CST
- Game weather: Cloudy, 57 °F (14 °C)
- Game attendance: 22,043
- Referee: Nate Black
- TV announcers (ESPN2): Anish Shroff, Andre Ware, and Paul Carcaterra
- Box score, Recap

Game information
First quarter
- SMU – Moochie Dixon 8-yard pass from Preston Stone (Collin Rogers kick), 11:39. Mustangs 7–0. Drive: 6 plays, 68 yards, 2:05.
- UNT – Trey Cleveland 19-yard pass from Chandler Rogers (Noah Rauschenberg kick), 4:47. Tied 7–7. Drive: 10 plays, 80 yards, 3:50.
- SMU – RJ Maryland 24-yard pass from Preston Stone (Collin Rogers kick), 0:34. Mustangs 14–7. Drive: 10 plays, 75 yards, 4:13.

Second quarter

- SMU – Collin Rogers 20-yard field goal, 10:29. Mustangs 17–7. Drive: 12 plays, 72 yards, 3:42.
- UNT – Oscar Adaway III 7-yard run (Noah Rauschenberg kick), 7:07. Mustangs 17–14. Drive: 8 plays, 75 yards, 3:22.

Third quarter

- SMU – Tyler Lavine 5-yard run (Collin Rogers kick), 11:08. Mustangs 24–14. Drive: 3 plays, 17 yards, 0:51.
- SMU – Jaylan Knighton 20-yard run (Collin Rogers kick), 2:15. Mustangs 31–14. Drive: 4 plays, 55 yards, 1:29.

Fourth quarter

- SMU – Camar Wheaton 22-yard run (Collin Rogers kick), 12:44. Mustangs 38–14. Drive: 3 plays, 77 yards, 1:02.
- SMU – LJ Johnson Jr. 3-yard run (Collin Rogers kick), 4:00. Mustangs 45–14. Drive: 10 plays, 70 yards, 6:38.
- UNT – Blair Conwright 29-yard pass from Chandler Rogers (Noah Rauschenberg kick), 1:27. Mustangs 45–21. Drive: 7 plays, 68 yards, 2:28.

Statistics	UNT	SMU
First downs	18	28
Total yards	372	552
Rushing yards	132	318
Passing yards	240	234
Turnovers	2	1
Time of possession	26:34	33:26

Team	Category	Player	Statistics
North Texas	Passing	Chandler Rogers	18/31, 240 yards, 2 TD, INT
North Texas	Rushing	Oscar Adaway III	11 rushes, 90 yards, TD
North Texas	Receiving	Trey Cleveland	3 receptions, 72 yards, TD
SMU	Passing	Preston Stone	11/20, 234 yards, 2 TD, INT
SMU	Rushing	Jaylan Knighton	17 rushes, 129 yards, TD
SMU	Receiving	Moochie Dixon	3 receptions, 99 yards, TD

=== at Tulsa ===
North Texas (3–7, 1–5) at Tulsa (3–7, 1–5) – Game summary

Quarter	1	2	3	4	Total
North Texas	7	14	14	0	35
Tulsa	7	14	0	7	28

at Skelly Field at H. A. Chapman Stadium • Tulsa, OK

- Date: November 18, 2023
- Game time: 2:00 p.m. CDT
- Game weather: • Temperature:
- Game attendance: 16,250
- TV: ESPN+

Game information

First quarter
Second quarter
Third quarter
Fourth quarter

Statistics	UNT	TLSA
First downs	22	22
Plays–yards	78–593	77–434
Rushes–yards	47–299	43–183
Passing yards	294	251
Passing: comp–att–int	19–31–0	17–34–1
Time of possession	32:04	27:56

Team	Category	Player	Statistics
North Texas	Passing	Chandler Rogers	19/31, 294 yards, 3 TD
North Texas	Rushing	Oscar Adaway III	16 carries, 126 yards, TD
North Texas	Receiving	Ja'Mori Maclin	2 receptions, 61 yards
Tulsa	Passing	Kirk Francis	17/34, 251 yards, 3 TD, INT
Tulsa	Rushing	Anthony Watkins	21 carries, 115 yards, TD
Tulsa	Receiving	Kamdyn Benjamin	8 receptions, 93 yards, TD
