= Kevin Jennings (American football) =

American football player (born 2004)

No. 7 – SMU Mustangs
- Position: Quarterback
- Class: (redshirt) Senior

Personal information
- Born: April 10, 2004 (age 22); Dallas, Texas, U.S.
- Listed height: 6 ft 0 in (1.83 m)
- Listed weight: 195 lb (88 kg)

Career information
- High school: South Oak Cliff (Dallas, Texas)
- College: SMU (2022–present)

Awards and highlights
- Third-team All-ACC (2024)
- Stats at ESPN

Kevin Jennings (born April 10, 2004) is an American college football quarterback for the SMU Mustangs.

== Early life ==
Jennings grew up in the Oak Cliff neighborhood of Dallas and attended South Oak Cliff High School. In his senior year, Jennings led the Golden Bears to a 14–1 record, winning the 2021 5A Division II State Championship. Jennings finished his high school career throwing for 5,932 yards and 71 touchdowns along with 557 rushing yards and 8 rushing touchdowns. Rated a three-star prospect coming out of high school, Jennings committed to play for SMU, having received offers from schools such as Missouri State, Sam Houston, Lamar, and Texas A&M–Commerce (now East Texas A&M).

== College career ==
Jennings made his first collegiate start against Tulane in the 2023 AAC Championship Game after starter Preston Stone suffered an ankle injury during the Mustangs' regular season finale against Navy; Jennings finished the game with 266 total yards as SMU won 26–14.

Entering the 2024 season, Jennings was listed second on the Mustangs' depth chart as Stone had recovered from injury. Prior to the Mustangs' season opener at Nevada, head coach Rhett Lashlee announced that Stone and Jennings would be splitting playing time; this arrangement lasted for the first three games, with Stone starting all three before Jennings came in. On September 10, during the team's bye week, Lashlee announced that Jennings would be the Mustangs' starter. Against Florida State, Jennings threw for a career-high 3 touchdowns as the Mustangs won 42–16. Jennings would ultimately lead the Mustangs to the 2024 ACC Championship Game where they would fall to Clemson 34-31. The team would go on to reach the 2024 College Football Playoff as the 11th seed, losing to Penn State in the opening round 38-10.

Heading into his first full year as a starter in 2025, high expectations were cast upon Jennings as he was regarded as a Heisman Trophy dark horse and finishing third in voting for the 2025 ACC Football Preseason Player of the Year. Jennings would battle a lingering bone bruise on his ankle, but appear in all twelve games, finishing the regular season with 3,363 passing yards and 26 touchdowns en route to an appearance in the Holiday Bowl against Arizona. In 2026, SMU announced that they would be naming their new $150 million dollar recovery center after Jennings; he is believed to be the first active college football player to have a facility named after him while still a student.

=== Statistics ===
Season	Team	Games			Passing								Rushing			
Season	Team	GP	GS	Record	Cmp	Att	Pct	Yds	Y/A	TD	Int	Rtg	Att	Yds	Avg	TD
2022	SMU	4	0	—	17	22	77.3	205	9.3	1	0	170.5	5	8	1.6	0
2023	SMU	8	2	1−1	61	105	58.1	618	5.9	5	2	119.4	37	142	3.8	1
2024	SMU	14	11	9−2	247	380	65.0	3,245	8.5	23	11	150.9	101	354	3.5	5
2025	SMU	13	13	9−4	300	454	66.1	3,641	8.0	26	13	146.6	70	54	0.8	4
2026	SMU	11	11	7–4	255	363	70.2	3,189	8.8	26	8	163.4	72	121	1.7	2
Career		50	37	26−11	880	1,324	66.5	10,898	8.2	81	34	150.7	285	679	2.4	12
