= Preston Stone =

American football player (born 2001)

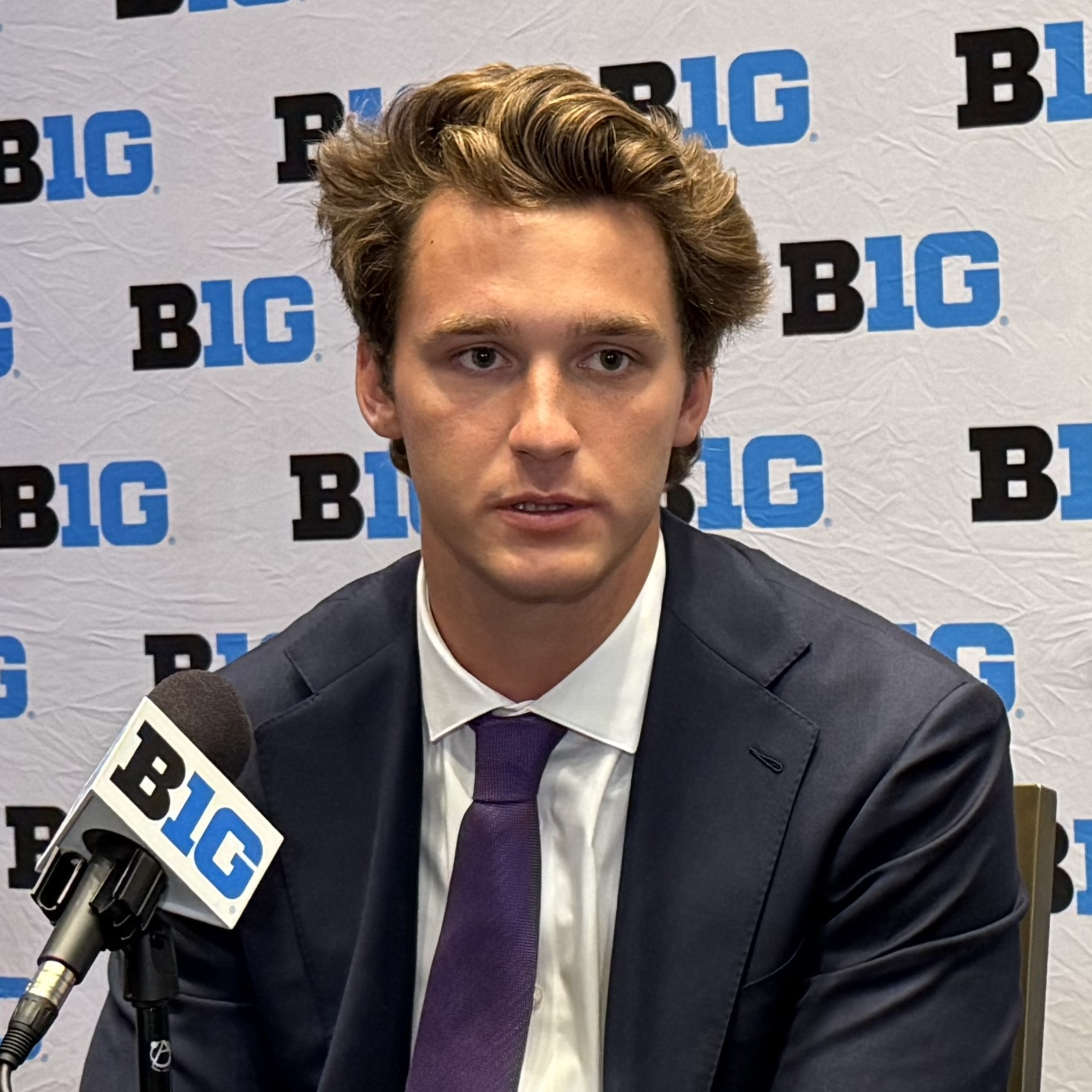
- Stone at 2025 Big Ten Media Days

No. 8
- Position: Quarterback

Personal information
- Born: October 16, 2001 (age 25)
- Listed height: 6 ft 1 in (1.85 m)
- Listed weight: 219 lb (99 kg)

Career information
- High school: Parish Episcopal School
- College: SMU (2021–2024); Northwestern (2025)

Awards and highlights
- American All-Academic Team (2021); Third-team All-AAC (2023)
- Stats at ESPN

Preston Stone (born October 16, 2001) is an American former college football quarterback. He played for the SMU Mustangs and the Northwestern Wildcats.

== Early life ==
Stone attended Parish Episcopal School, where he completed 902 of 1,376 pass attempts for 13,178 yards and 148 touchdowns to 21 interceptions. He also rushed for 2,172 yards and 34 touchdowns. Coming out of high school, Stone was rated a four-star recruit by ESPN and Rivals.com, ranking at 121st on the ESPN 300. He committed to play college football for SMU. Stone also received offers from schools such as Alabama, Auburn, Arizona, and Arizona State.

== College career ==
In week 8 of the 2022 season, Stone made his first career start, as he went 11 for 17 passing for 219 yards and a touchdown in a win over Tulsa. He finished the 2022 season completing 28 of 48 passes for 388 yards and two touchdowns to one interception; Stone also rushed for 63 yards and two touchdowns.

In the 2023, Stone led SMU to a 10-2 record passing for 3,197 yards completing 206 of 344 pass attempts witn six interceptions. After starting every game for the 2023 season, Stone suffered an ankle injury during SMU's 59–14 victory over Navy, leaving him unable to participate in the AAC Championship Game against Tulane.

On September 10, 2024, SMU head coach Rhett Lashlee announced that Kevin Jennings would be the Mustangs' starting quarterback. Stone and Jennings had been splitting playing time during the team's first three games.

On December 10, 2024, Stone announced that he would enter the transfer portal. On December 24, 2024 Stone announced that he would be transferring to Northwestern University for the 2025 season.

=== Statistics ===
Season	Team	Games			Passing								Rushing			
Season	Team	GP	GS	Record	Cmp	Att	Pct	Yds	Avg	TD	Int	Rtg	Att	Yds	Avg	TD
2021	SMU	3	0	—	3	7	42.9	24	3.4	0	0	71.7	1	2	2.0	0
2022	SMU	6	1	1−0	28	48	58.3	388	8.1	2	1	135.8	14	63	4.5	2
2023	SMU	12	12	10−2	206	344	59.9	3,197	9.3	28	6	161.3	62	198	3.2	4
2024	SMU	7	3	2−1	30	51	58.8	421	8.3	5	1	156.6	11	24	2.6	0
2025	Northwestern	13	13	7−6	222	370	60.0	2,400	6.5	17	12	123.2	50	3	0.1	1
Career		41	29	20−9	489	820	59.6	6,430	7.8	52	20	141.6	138	290	2.1	7

== Professional career ==
Pre-draft measurables
Height	Weight	Arm length	Hand span	Wingspan	Vertical jump	Broad jump
6 ft 1 1/8 in (1.86 m)	219 lb (99 kg)	29 1/4 in (0.74 m)	8 1/2 in (0.22 m)	6 ft 0 5/8 in (1.84 m)	29.0 in (0.74 m)	8 ft 4 in (2.54 m)
All values from Pro Day
