= 2023 Temple Owls football team =

American college football season

2023 Temple Owls football
- Conference: American Athletic Conference
- Record: 3–9 (1–7 AAC)
- Head coach: Stan Drayton (2nd season)
- Offensive coordinator: Danny Langsdorf (2nd season)
- Offensive scheme: Pro-style
- Defensive coordinator: Everett Withers (1st season)
- Base defense: Multiple
- Home stadium: Lincoln Financial Field

2023 American Athletic Conference football standings
	Conf.			Overall
Team	W		L	W		L
No. 22 SMU y$	8	–	0	11	–	3
Tulane y	8	–	0	11	–	3
UTSA	7	–	1	9	–	4
Memphis	6	–	2	10	–	3
South Florida	4	–	4	7	–	6
Rice	4	–	4	6	–	7
Navy	4	–	4	5	–	7
North Texas	3	–	5	5	–	7
UAB	3	–	5	4	–	8
Florida Atlantic	3	–	5	4	–	8
Charlotte	2	–	6	3	–	9
Tulsa	2	–	6	4	–	8
Temple	1	–	7	3	–	9
East Carolina	1	–	7	2	–	10
Championship: SMU 26, Tulane 14
$ – Conference champion; y – Championship game participant; Rankings from AP Poll

The 2023 Temple Owls football team represented Temple University in the 2023 NCAA Division I FBS football season. They played their home games at Lincoln Financial Field in Philadelphia, Pennsylvania, and were led by second-year head coach Stan Drayton, competing as a member of the American Athletic Conference (The American). The Temple Owls football team drew an average home attendance of 13,446 in 2023.

== Schedule ==
Date	Time	Opponent	Site	TV	Result	Attendance
September 2	2:00 p.m.	Akron*	Lincoln Financial Field; Philadelphia, PA	ESPN+	W 24–21	12,456
September 9	7:30 p.m.	at Rutgers*	SHI Stadium; Piscataway, NJ	BTN	L 7–36	45,317
September 16	2:00 p.m.	Norfolk State*	Lincoln Financial Field; Philadelphia, PA	ESPN+	W 41–9	10,932
September 23	3:30 p.m.	No. 20 Miami (FL)*	Lincoln Financial Field; Philadelphia, PA	ESPN2	L 7–41	17,234
September 28	7:30 p.m.	at Tulsa	H.A. Chapman Stadium; Tulsa, OK	ESPN	L 26–48	17,538
October 7	2:00 p.m.	UTSA	Lincoln Financial Field; Philadelphia, PA	ESPN+	L 34–49	18,388
October 14	12:00 p.m.	at North Texas	DATCU Stadium; Denton, TX	ESPNU	L 14–45	13,678
October 20	7:00 p.m.	SMU	Lincoln Financial Field; Philadelphia, PA	ESPN	L 0–55	11,232
November 4	2:00 p.m.	Navy	Lincoln Financial Field; Philadelphia, PA	ESPN+	W 32–18	13,049
November 11	12:00 p.m.	at South Florida	Raymond James Stadium; Tampa, FL	ESPN+	L 23–27	30,938
November 18	3:00 p.m.	at UAB	Protective Stadium; Birmingham, AL	ESPN+	L 24–34	17,486
November 24	12:00 p.m.	Memphis	Lincoln Financial Field; Philadelphia, PA	ESPN	L 21–45	10,830
*Non-conference game; Rankings from AP Poll (and CFP Rankings, after November 1) - Released prior to game; All times are in Eastern time

== Personnel ==
Name	Position	Season at Temple
Stan Drayton	Head coach	2nd
Danny Langsdorf	Offensive coordinator/quarterbacks coach	2nd
Everett Withers	Defensive coordinator	2nd
Adam Scheier	Special teams coordinator/Tight end coach	2nd
Chris Wiesehan	Offensive line coach/Run Game coordinator	7th
Jafar Williams	Wide receivers coach/Pass Game coordinator	2nd
Marvin Clecidor	Safeties coach	2nd
Tyree Foreman	Running backs coach	9th
Dominique Bowman	Cornerbacks coach	1st
Larry Knight	Defensive line coach	1st
Chris Woods	Linebackers coach	2nd
Chris Fenelon	Strength and conditioning	2nd

=== Recruiting class ===
The following recruits and transfers have signed letters of intent or verbally committed to the Temple Owls football program for the 2023 recruiting year.

College recruiting (2023)
Name	Hometown	School	Height	Weight	40^{‡}	Commit date
Richard Dandridge; WR	Miami, FL	Homestead	5 ft 10 in (1.78 m)	157 lb (71 kg)	–	May 24, 2022
Richard Dandridge; WR	Recruit ratings: Rivals:					
Nathan Stewart; WR	Laurel, MD	St. Vincent Pallotti	6 ft 5 in (1.96 m)	190 lb (86 kg)	–	May 27, 2022
Nathan Stewart; WR	Recruit ratings: Rivals:					
Tyler Douglas; QB	Oakhurst, NJ	Ocean Township	6 ft 2 in (1.88 m)	190 lb (86 kg)	–	Jun 13, 2022
Tyler Douglas; QB	Recruit ratings: Rivals:					
Kyle Williams; RB	Harrisburg, PA	Harrisburg	6 ft 0 in (1.83 m)	185 lb (84 kg)	–	Jun 17, 2022
Kyle Williams; RB	Recruit ratings: Rivals:					
Preston Everhart; WR	Princeton, NJ	Peddie Prep	5 ft 10 in (1.78 m)	170 lb (77 kg)	–	Jun 21, 2022
Preston Everhart; WR	Recruit ratings: Rivals:					
Kaleb Barnett; CB	Miami, FL	Jackson	6 ft 1 in (1.85 m)	185 lb (84 kg)	–	Jun 21, 2022
Kaleb Barnett; CB	Recruit ratings: Rivals:					
Tyrese Whitaker; LB	Philadelphia, PA	Northeast	6 ft 2 in (1.88 m)	225 lb (102 kg)	–	Jun 23, 2022
Tyrese Whitaker; LB	Recruit ratings: Rivals:					
Conlan Greene; DE	Harrison City, PA	Penn Trafford	6 ft 4 in (1.93 m)	250 lb (110 kg)	–	Jun 24, 2022
Conlan Greene; DE	Recruit ratings: Rivals:					
Kevin Terry; OL	Clearwater, FL	Central Catholic	6 ft 6 in (1.98 m)	270 lb (120 kg)	–	Jun 25, 2022
Kevin Terry; OL	Recruit ratings: Rivals:					
Eric King; OL	Jersey City, NJ	St. Peter's Prep	6 ft 3 in (1.91 m)	314 lb (142 kg)	–	Jun 27, 2022
Eric King; OL	Recruit ratings: Rivals:					
Joquez Smith; RB	Tampa, FL	Jesuit	5 ft 8 in (1.73 m)	190 lb (86 kg)	–	Jul 1, 2022
Joquez Smith; RB	Recruit ratings: Rivals:					
Luke Watson; OL	Wilmington, DE	St. Mark's	6 ft 5 in (1.96 m)	270 lb (120 kg)	–	Jul 5, 2022
Luke Watson; OL	Recruit ratings: Rivals:					
Zyil Powell; ATH	Paramus, NJ	Paramus Catholic	6 ft 1 in (1.85 m)	180 lb (82 kg)	–	Aug 2, 2022
Zyil Powell; ATH	Recruit ratings: Rivals:					
Anthony Baxter; CB	Fort Myers, FL	Riverdale	6 ft 4 in (1.93 m)	195 lb (88 kg)	–	Aug 3, 2022
Anthony Baxter; CB	Recruit ratings: Rivals:					
Peter Clarke; TE	London, England	NFL Academy	6 ft 6 in (1.98 m)	248 lb (112 kg)	–	Aug 10, 2022
Peter Clarke; TE	Recruit ratings: Rivals:					
Zyheem Coleman-Frazier; ATH	Sicklerville, NJ	Timber Creek	6 ft 0 in (1.83 m)	165 lb (75 kg)	–	Oct 23, 2022
Zyheem Coleman-Frazier; ATH	Recruit ratings: Rivals:					
Xavier Irvin; WR	Miami, FL	Booker T. Washington	5 ft 11 in (1.80 m)	175 lb (79 kg)	–	Nov 9, 2022
Xavier Irvin; WR	Recruit ratings: Rivals:					
Diego Barajas; OL	Oakland, CA	Laney C.C.	6 ft 6 in (1.98 m)	335 lb (152 kg)	–	Dec 19, 2022
Diego Barajas; OL	Recruit ratings: Rivals:					
Dante Atton; K	Melbourne, Australia	ProKick Academy	6 ft 0 in (1.83 m)	190 lb (86 kg)	–	Dec 19, 2022
Dante Atton; K	Recruit ratings: Rivals:					
Jordan Montgomery; ATH	Philadelphia, PA	Roman Catholic	6 ft 2 in (1.88 m)	230 lb (100 kg)	–	Dec 20, 2022
Jordan Montgomery; ATH	Recruit ratings: Rivals:					
Gensley Auguste; DT	West Orange, NJ	West Orange	6 ft 6 in (1.98 m)	270 lb (120 kg)	–	Dec 20, 2022
Gensley Auguste; DT	Recruit ratings: Rivals:					
Darrell Sweeting; CB	Palm Beach Gardens, FL	Benjamin School	5 ft 11 in (1.80 m)	165 lb (75 kg)	–	Dec 21, 2022
Darrell Sweeting; CB	Recruit ratings: Rivals:					
Ben Osueke; CB	Brenham, TX	Blinn C.C.	6 ft 0 in (1.83 m)	180 lb (82 kg)	–	Dec 21, 2022
Ben Osueke; CB	Recruit ratings: Rivals:					
Melvin Siani; OT	Kingston, PA	Wyoming Seminary	6 ft 6 in (1.98 m)	270 lb (120 kg)	–	Dec 21, 2022
Melvin Siani; OT	Recruit ratings: Rivals:					
Reggie Jones; DT	Santa Clarita, CA	College of the Canyons	6 ft 2 in (1.88 m)	285 lb (129 kg)	–	Feb 1, 2023
Reggie Jones; DT	Recruit ratings: Rivals:					
Overall recruit ranking:
‡ Refers to 40-yard dash; Note: In many cases, Scout, Rivals, 247Sports, On3, and ESPN may conflict in their listings of height, weight and 40 time.; In these cases, the average was taken. ESPN grades are on a 100-point scale.; Sources: "Temple Football Commitments". Rivals.; "ESPN". ESPN.; "2023 Team Ranking". Rivals.com.
