= 2023 American Athletic Conference Football Championship Game =

- 9th AAC Championship Game
SMU Mustangs	Tulane Green Wave
(10–2)	(11–1)
26	14
Head coach: Rhett Lashlee	Head coach: Willie Fritz
AP / Coaches / CFP; 25 / 24 / NR	AP / Coaches / CFP; 17 / 18 / 22
	1	2	3	4	Total
SMU	7	7	3	9	26
Tulane	7	0	7	0	14
- Date: December 2, 2023
- Season: 2023
- Stadium: Yulman Stadium
- Location: New Orleans, LA
- MVP: Isaiah Nwokobia, S, SMU
- Favorite: Tulane by 2.5
- Referee: Luke Richmond
- Attendance: 25,206

United States TV coverage
- Network: ABC
- Announcers: Roy Philpott (play-by-play), Roddy Jones (analyst) and Taylor McGregor (sideline reporter)

2023 American Athletic Conference football standings
	Conf.			Overall
Team	W		L	W		L
No. 22 SMU y$	8	–	0	11	–	3
Tulane y	8	–	0	11	–	3
UTSA	7	–	1	9	–	4
Memphis	6	–	2	10	–	3
South Florida	4	–	4	7	–	6
Rice	4	–	4	6	–	7
Navy	4	–	4	5	–	7
North Texas	3	–	5	5	–	7
UAB	3	–	5	4	–	8
Florida Atlantic	3	–	5	4	–	8
Charlotte	2	–	6	3	–	9
Tulsa	2	–	6	4	–	8
Temple	1	–	7	3	–	9
East Carolina	1	–	7	2	–	10
Championship: SMU 26, Tulane 14
$ – Conference champion; y – Championship game participant; Rankings from AP Poll

The 2023 American Athletic Conference Football Championship Game was a college football game played on December 2, 2023, at Yulman Stadium in New Orleans. It was the ninth American Athletic Conference Football Championship Game and determined the champion of the American Athletic Conference (The American) for the 2023 season. The game started at 4:00 p.m. EST and aired on ABC. The game featured the Tulane Green Wave and the SMU Mustangs. SMU defeated Tulane 26–14 for the program's first conference championship since it won a share of the Southwest Conference title in 1984.

== Teams ==
The 2023 American Conference Championship Game featured the Tulane Green Wave as the #1 seed, and the SMU Mustangs as the #2 seed. This was the second consecutive American title game appearance for Tulane and its second overall. The Green Wave won its previous appearance in 2022. This was the first and only American title game appearance for SMU, with the school set to join the Atlantic Coast Conference in July 2024.

=== Tulane Green Wave ===
Tulane clinched a spot in the game following its win over UTSA on November 24. It enters the game with an 11–1 record, 8–0 in conference play. This was the Green Wave's second-straight appearance in the American Athletic Conference Championship Game, having defeated UCF 45–28 in the 2022 game.

=== SMU Mustangs ===
SMU clinched a spot in the game following its win over Navy on November 25. The Mustangs entered the game with a 10–2 record, 8–0 in conference play. This was the Mustangs' first and only appearance in an American Athletic Conference Championship Game.

== Game summary ==
SMU quarterback Kevin Jennings made his first career start in the championship game. On the first play of the game, Jennings fumbled the ball, allowing Tulane to return it to the 1-yard line and score immediately afterwards. Despite this and two interceptions, SMU led Tulane 14–7 at the end of the first half thanks to its strong defense, which forced Tulane to punt the ball nine times over the course of the game. In the second half, Jennings continued to lead SMU down the field, allowing kicker Collin Rogers to score four field goals. Near the end of the fourth quarter, safety Isaiah Nwokobia intercepted the ball to seal SMU's 26–14 victory over Tulane, winning SMU its first conference championship since 1984. After the game, Nwokobia was awarded the Most Outstanding Player award, becoming the first defensive player to win such an award in an AAC title game.

=== Scoring summary ===
2023 American Athletic Conference Championship Game
SMU Mustangs (10–2, 8–0) vs. No. 22 Tulane Green Wave (11–1, 8–0)

Quarter	1	2	3	4	Total
SMU	7	7	3	9	26
No. 22 Tulane	7	0	7	0	14

at Yulman Stadium • New Orleans, LA

- Date: Saturday, December 2, 2023
- Game time: 4:00 p.m. EST
- Game weather: Temperature: 72 °F (22 °C) • Wind: SW at 5 miles per hour (8.0 km/h) • Weather: Rain
- Game attendance: 25,206
- Referee: Luke Richmond
- TV announcers (ABC): Roy Philpott, Roddy Jones, Taylor McGregor

Game information

First Quarter

- (14:50) TULN – Michael Pratt 1 yard rush, Valentino Ambrosio kick (Drive: 1 play, 1 yard, 0:03; Tulane 7–0)
- (7:37) SMU – Jaylan Knighton 6 yard rush, Collin Rogers kick (Drive: 5 plays, 50 yards, 1:37; Tied 7–7)

Second Quarter

- (1:32) SMU – Key'Shawn Smith 17 yard pass from Kevin Jennings, Collin Rogers kick (Drive: 10 plays, 65 yards, 4:18; SMU 14–7)

Third Quarter

- (8:46) TULN – Yulkeith Brown 42 yard pass from Michael Pratt, Valentino Ambrosio kick (Drive: 5 plays, 63 yards, 2:34; Tied 14–14)
- (5:35) SMU – Collin Rogers 48 yard field goal (Drive: 7 plays, 41 yards, 3:11; SMU 17–14)

Fourth Quarter

- (12:38) SMU – Collin Rogers 32 yard field goal (Drive: 11 plays, 52 yards, 5:52; SMU 20–14)
- (8:58) SMU – Collin Rogers 32 yard field goal (Drive: 5 plays, 15 yards, 1:47; SMU 23–14)
- (3:15) SMU – Collin Rogers 45 yard field goal (Drive: 6 plays, 9 yards, 1:13; SMU 26–14)

Statistics	SMU	TUL
First downs	21	12
Plays–yards	78–396	62–269
Rushes–yards	45–193	26–31
Passing yards	203	238
Passing: comp–att–int	19–33–2	21–36–1
Time of possession	34:07	25:53

Team	Category	Player	Statistics
SMU	Passing	Kevin Jennings	19/33, 203 yards, 1 TD, 2 INT
SMU	Rushing	Jaylan Knighton	15 carries, 75 yards, 1 TD
SMU	Receiving	R. J. Maryland	5 receptions, 56 yards
Tulane	Passing	Michael Pratt	21/36, 238 yards, 1 TD, 1 INT
Tulane	Rushing	Makhi Hughes	11 carries, 44 yards
Tulane	Receiving	Yulkieth Brown	5 receptions, 90 yards, 1 TD
