= 2023 South Florida Bulls football team =

American college football season

2023 South Florida Bulls football

Boca Raton Bowl champion

Boca Raton Bowl, W 45–0 vs. Syracuse
- Conference: American Athletic Conference
- Record: 7–6 (4–4 AAC)
- Head coach: Alex Golesh (1st season)
- Offensive coordinator: Joel Gordon (1st season)
- Offensive scheme: Veer and shoot
- Defensive coordinator: Todd Orlando (1st season)
- Base defense: Multiple 3–3–5
- Home stadium: Raymond James Stadium

2023 American Athletic Conference football standings
	Conf.			Overall
Team	W		L	W		L
No. 22 SMU y$	8	–	0	11	–	3
Tulane y	8	–	0	11	–	3
UTSA	7	–	1	9	–	4
Memphis	6	–	2	10	–	3
South Florida	4	–	4	7	–	6
Rice	4	–	4	6	–	7
Navy	4	–	4	5	–	7
North Texas	3	–	5	5	–	7
UAB	3	–	5	4	–	8
Florida Atlantic	3	–	5	4	–	8
Charlotte	2	–	6	3	–	9
Tulsa	2	–	6	4	–	8
Temple	1	–	7	3	–	9
East Carolina	1	–	7	2	–	10
Championship: SMU 26, Tulane 14
$ – Conference champion; y – Championship game participant; Rankings from AP Poll

The 2023 South Florida Bulls football team represented the University of South Florida (USF) during the 2023 NCAA Division I FBS football season. The Bulls played their home games at Raymond James Stadium in Tampa, Florida. The Bulls were led by first-year head coach Alex Golesh. This season was the tenth for the Bulls as members of the American Athletic Conference, and their 26th season overall. The South Florida Bulls football team drew an average home attendance of 37,944 in 2023.

== Schedule ==
Date	Time	Opponent	Site	TV	Result	Attendance
September 2	3:30 p.m.	at Western Kentucky*	Houchens Industries–L. T. Smith Stadium; Bowling Green, KY	CBSSN	L 24–41	15,438
September 9	7:00 p.m.	No. 23 (FCS) Florida A&M*	Raymond James Stadium; Tampa, FL	ESPN+	W 38–24	36,495
September 16	3:30 p.m.	No. 10 Alabama*	Raymond James Stadium; Tampa, FL	ABC	L 3–17	65,138
September 23	4:00 p.m.	Rice	Raymond James Stadium; Tampa, FL	ESPNU	W 42–29	29,141
September 30	3:30 p.m.	at Navy	Navy–Marine Corps Memorial Stadium; Annapolis, MD	CBSSN	W 44–30	29,789
October 7	4:00 p.m.	at UAB	Protective Stadium; Birmingham, AL	ESPN2	L 35–56	23,792
October 14	3:30 p.m.	Florida Atlantic^{†}	Raymond James Stadium; Tampa, FL (rivalry)	ESPN2	L 14–56	36,670
October 21	3:30 p.m.	at UConn*	Rentschler Field; East Hartford, CT	CBSSN	W 24–21	21,704
November 4	3:00 p.m.	at Memphis	Simmons Bank Liberty Stadium; Memphis, TN	ESPN+	L 50–59	30,223
November 11	12:00 p.m.	Temple	Raymond James Stadium; Tampa, FL	ESPN+	W 27–23	30,938
November 17	9:00 p.m.	at UTSA	Alamodome; San Antonio, TX	ESPN2	L 21–49	22,096
November 25	7:30 p.m.	Charlotte	Raymond James Stadium; Tampa, FL	ESPNU	W 48–14	29,279
December 21	8:00 p.m.	vs. Syracuse*	FAU Stadium; Boca Raton, FL (Boca Raton Bowl)	ESPN	W 45–0	20,711
*Non-conference game; ^{†}Homecoming; Rankings from AP Poll (and CFP Rankings, after November 1) - Released prior to game; All times are in Eastern time

== Game summaries ==
=== Rice ===
Rice Owls at South Florida Bulls – Game summary

Quarter	1	2	3	4	Total
Rice	7	7	7	8	29
South Florida	3	10	14	15	42

at Raymond James Stadium, Tampa, Florida

- Date: September 23
- Game time: 3:00 p.m. CDT/4:00 p.m. EDT
- Game weather: Sunny, 88 °F (31 °C)
- Game attendance: 29,141
- Referee: Edwin Lee
- TV announcers (ESPNU): Jay Alter and Rene Ingoglia

Game information
First quarter
- USF – John Cannon 31-yard field goal, 7:22. Bulls 3–0. Drive: 12 plays, 62 yards, 4:49.
- RICE – Daelen Alexander 3-yard pass from JT Daniels (Tim Horn kick), 2:28. Owls 7–3. Drive: 9 plays, 75 yards, 4:54.

Second quarter

- USF – John Cannon 40-yard field goal, 14:07. Owls 7–6. Drive: 8 plays, 53 yards, 3:21.
- USF – K'Wan Powell 26-yard run (John Cannon kick), 1:35. Bulls 13–7. Drive: 6 plays, 78 yards, 2:35.
- RICE – Dean Connors 2-yard pass from JT Daniels (Tim Horn kick), 0:15. Owls 14–13. Drive: 10 plays, 70 yards, 1:14.

Third quarter

- USF – Byrum Brown 1-yard run (John Cannon kick), 13:54. Bulls 20–14. Drive: 4 plays, 75 yards, 1:06.
- RICE – Dean Connors 80-yard pass from JT Daniels (Tim Horn kick), 7:53. Owls 21–20. Drive: 1 play, 80 yards, 0:11.
- USF – Naiem Simmons 49-yard pass from Byrum Brown (John Cannon kick), 2:07. Bulls 27–21. Drive: 2 plays, 55 yards, 0:25.

Fourth quarter

- USF – Sean Atkins 8-yard pass from Byrum Brown (John Cannon kick), 13:22. Bulls 34–21. Drive: 5 plays, 75 yards, 1:38.
- USF – Nay'Quan Wright 1-yard run (Sean Atkins pass to Byrum Brown), 8:52. Bulls 42–21. Drive: 9 plays, 57 yards, 2:57.
- RICE – Rawson MacNeil 9-yard pass from AJ Padgett (AJ Padgett pass to Luke McCaffrey), 3:46. Bulls 42–29. Drive: 10 plays, 79 yards, 4:59.

Statistics	RICE	USF
First downs	19	25
Total yards	492	597
Rushing yards	1	162
Passing yards	491	435
Turnovers	0	1
Time of possession	32:27	27:33

Team	Category	Player	Statistics
Rice	Passing	JT Daniels	27/40, 432 yards, 3 TD
Rice	Rushing	Juma Otoviano	4 rushes, 12 yards
Rice	Receiving	Luke McCaffrey	9 receptions, 199 yards
South Florida	Passing	Byrum Brown	22/29, 435 yards, 2 TD
South Florida	Rushing	Byrum Brown	14 rushes, 82 yards, TD
South Florida	Receiving	Naiem Simmons	8 receptions, 272 yards, TD

=== at Navy ===
South Florida Bulls (2-2) vs Navy Midshipmen (1-2) – Game summary

Quarter	1	2	3	4	Total
Bulls	7	16	7	14	44
Midshipmen	14	6	3	7	30

at Navy-Marine Corps Memorial Stadium • Annapolis, Maryland

- Date: September 30th
- Game time: 3:30 p.m. EST
- Game weather: Temperature: 72 °F (22 °C) • Wind: NE at 5 miles per hour (8.0 km/h) • Weather: Clear
- Game attendance: 29,789
- Referee: Scott Hardin
- TV announcers (CBSSN): Jordan Kent (play-by-play), Randy Cross (analyst) & Sheehan Stanwick Burch (sideline)

Game information

First quarter

- (11:52) NAVY – Tai Lavatai 1-yard run, Nathan Kirkwood kick (Drive: 4 plays, 18 yards, 1:20; Navy 7-0)
- (8:55) NAVY – Tai Lavatai 4-yard run, Nathan Kirkwood kick (Drive: 4 plays, 30 yards, 1:50; Navy 14-0)
- (5:40) USF – Sean Atkins 1-yard pass from Byrum Brown, John Cannon kick (Drive: 8 plays, 70 yards, 3:14; Navy 14-7)

Second quarter

- (12:09) USF – Nay'Quan Wright 10-yard run, John Cannon kick (Drive: 10 plays, 67 yards, 3:10; Tied 14-14)
- (8:20) USF – Sean Atkins 88-yard pass from Byrum Brown, John Cannon kick (Drive: 2 plays, 88 yards, 0:39; USF 21-14)
- (1:57) NAVY – Anton Hall 2-yard pass from Blake Horvath, PAT blocked (Drive: 5 plays, 22 yards, 2:06; USF 21-20)
- (1:57) USF – Jhalyn Suler 69-yard PAT return (USF 23-20)

Third quarter

- (10:34) NAVY – Nathan Kirkwood 44-yard field goal (Drive: 6 plays, 12 yards, 2:54; Tied 23-23)
- (4:22) USF – Michael Stephens-Brown 15-yard pass from Byrum Brown, John Cannon kick (Drive: 8 plays, 67 yards, 2:52; USF 30-23)

Fourth quarter

- (14:50) USF – Tramel Logan 70-yard fumble recovery, John Cannon kick (USF 37-23)
- (7:45) USF – Michel Dukes 11-yard run, John Cannon kick (Drive: 9 plays, 74 yards, 3:13; USF 44-23)
- (7:28) NAVY – Eli Heidenreich 68-yard pass from Blake Horvath, Nathan Kirkwood kick (Drive: 1 play, 68 yards, 0:17; USF 44-30)

Statistics	South Florida	Navy
First downs	11	24
Plays–yards	59–330	78–435
Rushes–yards	48–240	44–98
Passing yards	90	338
Passing: comp–att–int	5–11–0	26–34–0
Turnovers		
Time of possession	31:08	28:52

Team	Category	Player	Statistics
South Florida	Passing	Byrum Brown	26–34, 338 yards, 3 TD
South Florida	Rushing	K'wan Powell	11 carries, 48 yards
South Florida	Receiving	Sean Atkins	4 receptions, 16 yards, 2 TD
Navy	Passing	Blake Horvath	4–6, 83 yards, 2 TD
Navy	Rushing	Alex Tezuka	13 carries, 82 yards
Navy	Receiving	Eli Heidenreich	1 reception, 68 yards

=== Florida Atlantic ===
Florida Atlantic Owls (2–3) vs South Florida Bulls (3–3) – Game summary

Quarter	1	2	3	4	Total
Owls	7	14	21	14	56
Bulls	0	14	0	0	14

at Raymond James Stadium • Tampa, Florida

- Date: October 14
- Game time: 3:30 p.m. EDT
- Game weather: Sunny • Temperature: 83 °F (28 °C) • Wind: NW at 11 miles per hour (18 km/h)
- Game attendance: 36,670
- Referee: Tim Rich
- TV announcers (ESPN2): Beth Mowins (play-by-play), Kirk Morrison (analyst), Stormy Buonantony (sideline reporter)

Game information

First quarter

- (11:43) FAU – Zeke Moore 2 yard pass from Daniel Richardson, Logan Lupo kick (Drive: 7 plays, 67 yards, 2:52; Florida Atlantic 7–0)

Second quarter

- (10:59) FAU – Michael Johnson Jr. 9 yard run, Logan Lupo kick (Drive: 7 plays, 86 yards, 2:46; Florida Atlantic 14–0)
- (9:33) USF – Nay’Quan Wright 8 yard run, John Cannon kick (Drive: 5 plays, 75 yards, 1:26; Florida Atlantic 14–7)
- (5:37) FAU – Larry McCammon 3 yard run, Logan Lupo kick (Drive: 9 plays, 75 yards, 3:56; Florida Atlantic 21–7)
- (0:12) USF – Gunnar Greenwald 2 yard pass from Byrum Brown, John Cannon kick (Drive: 10 plays, 76 yards, 2:17; Florida Atlantic 21–14)

Third quarter

- (12:41) FAU – Michael Johnson Jr. 5 yard run, Logan Lupo kick (Drive: 5 plays, 68 yards, 2:14; Florida Atlantic 28–14)
- (7:50) FAU – LaJohntay Wester 17 yard pass from Daniel Richardson, Logan Lupo kick (Drive: 8 plays, 64 yards, 3:08; Florida Atlantic 35–14)
- (6:14) FAU – LaJohntay Wester 67 yard punt return, Logan Lupo kick (Florida Atlantic 42–14)

Fourth quarter

- (14:55) FAU – Tony Johnson 23 yard pass from Daniel Richardson, Logan Lupo kick (Drive: 6 plays, 64 yards, 2:22; Florida Atlantic 49–14)
- (6:44) FAU – Kobe Lewis 12 yard run, Logan Lupo kick (Drive: 10 plays, 70 yards, 6:04; Florida Atlantic 56–14)

Statistics	Florida Atlantic	South Florida
First downs	27	21
Plays–yards	78–587	72–388
Rushes–yards	40–205	38–138
Passing yards	382	250
Passing: comp–att–int	31–38–1	20–34–0
Turnovers		
Time of possession	36:19	23:41

Team	Category	Player	Statistics
Florida Atlantic	Passing	Daniel Richardson	31/38, 382 yards, 3 TD, 1 INT
Florida Atlantic	Rushing	Larry McCammon	18 carries, 75 yards, 1 TD
Florida Atlantic	Receiving	Tony Johnson	8 receptions, 131 yards, 1 TD
South Florida	Passing	Byrum Brown	15/26, 179 yards, 1 TD
South Florida	Rushing	Nay’Quan Wright	15 carries, 106 yards, 1 TD
South Florida	Receiving	Michael Brown-Stephens	4 receptions, 98 yards

=== at UConn ===
South Florida Bulls at UConn Huskies – Game summary

Quarter	1	2	3	4	Total
Bulls	7	3	0	14	24
Huskies	0	14	0	7	21

at Pratt & Whitney Stadium at Rentschler Field, East Hartford, Connecticut

- Date: October 21
- Game time: 3:32 p.m. EDT
- Game weather: Rain, Wind N 12 MPH, 56 °F (13 °C)
- Game attendance: 21,704
- Referee: Jeff Magallanes
- TV announcers (CBSSN): Chris Lewis (play-by-play), Robert Turbin (color analyst), Keiana Martin (sideline)

Game information
First quarter
- USF – Wright, Nay'Quan 1 yd run (Cannon, John kick), 10:21. Bulls 7–0. Drive: 2 plays, 10 yards, TOP 00:30

Second quarter

- UCONN – Roberson, Ta'Quan 24 yd run (McFadden, Joe kick), 14:04. Tied 7–7. Drive: 8 plays, 84 yards, TOP 03:44
- USF – Cannon, John 45 yd field goal, 6:48. Bulls 10–7. Drive: 8 plays, 44 yards, TOP 02:37
- UCONN – Edwards, Cam 6 yd pass from Roberson, Ta'Quan (McFadden, Joe kick), 3:40. Huskies: 14–10. Drive: 7 plays, 75 yards, TOP 03:08

Third quarter

- No Scoring Plays

Fourth quarter

- UCONN – Edwards, Cam 33 yd run (McFadden, Joe kick), 12:48. Huskies 21–10. Drive: 7 plays, 71 yards, TOP 03:46
- USF – Brown, Byrum 6 yd run (Cannon, John kick), 9:51. Huskies 21–7. Drive: 9 plays, 75 yards, TOP 02:54
- USF – Wright, Nay'Quan 4 yd run (Cannon, John kick), 4:02. Bulls 24–21. Drive: 9 plays, 90 yards, TOP 02:56

Statistics

Statistics	USF	CONN
First downs	24	20
Total yards	463	368
Rushing yards	260	193
Passing yards	203	175
Turnovers	1	4
Time of possession	30:10	29:50

Team	Category	Player	Statistics
South Florida	Passing	Byrum Brown	27/39, 203 yds
South Florida	Rushing	Nay'Quan Wright	26 att, 186 yds, 2 TDs
South Florida	Receiving	Michael Brown-Stephens	9 rec, 92 yds
South Florida	Defense	Jhalyn Shuler	8 tackles
UConn	Passing	Ta'Quan Roberson	19/34, 175 yds, 1 TD
UConn	Rushing	Cam Edwards	22 att, 149 yds, 1 TD
UConn	Receiving	Cameron Ross	5 rec, 87 yds
UConn	Defense	Jackson Mitchell	15 tackles
