= 2023 UAB Blazers football team =

American college football season

2023 UAB Blazers football
- Conference: American Athletic Conference
- Record: 4–8 (3–5 AAC)
- Head coach: Trent Dilfer (1st season)
- Offensive coordinator: Alex Mortensen (1st season)
- Offensive scheme: Multiple
- Defensive coordinator: Sione Ta'ufo'ou (1st season)
- Base defense: Multiple 3–4
- Home stadium: Protective Stadium

Uniform
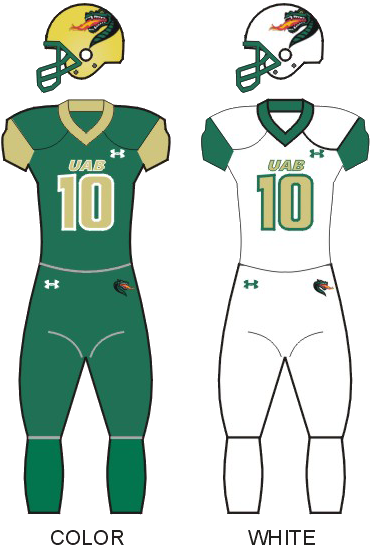

2023 American Athletic Conference football standings
	Conf.			Overall
Team	W		L	W		L
No. 22 SMU y$	8	–	0	11	–	3
Tulane y	8	–	0	11	–	3
UTSA	7	–	1	9	–	4
Memphis	6	–	2	10	–	3
South Florida	4	–	4	7	–	6
Rice	4	–	4	6	–	7
Navy	4	–	4	5	–	7
North Texas	3	–	5	5	–	7
UAB	3	–	5	4	–	8
Florida Atlantic	3	–	5	4	–	8
Charlotte	2	–	6	3	–	9
Tulsa	2	–	6	4	–	8
Temple	1	–	7	3	–	9
East Carolina	1	–	7	2	–	10
Championship: SMU 26, Tulane 14
$ – Conference champion; y – Championship game participant; Rankings from AP Poll

The 2023 UAB Blazers football team represented the University of Alabama at Birmingham (UAB) as a member of the American Athletic Conference (AAC) during the 2023 NCAA Division I FBS football season. Led by first-year head coach Trent Dilfer, the Blazers compiled an overall record of 4–8 with a mark of 3–5 in conference play, placing in a three-way tie for eighth in the AAC. UAB played home games at Protective Stadium in Birmingham, Alabama.

== Schedule ==
Date	Time	Opponent	Site	TV	Result	Attendance
August 31	7:00 p.m.	North Carolina A&T*	Protective Stadium; Birmingham, AL	ESPN+	W 35–6	25,363
September 9	5:00 p.m.	at Georgia Southern*	Allen E. Paulson Stadium; Statesboro, GA	ESPN+	L 35–49	20,103
September 16	6:00 p.m.	Louisiana*	Protective Stadium; Birmingham, AL	ESPN+	L 21–41	21,673
September 23	6:30 p.m.	at No. 1 Georgia*	Sanford Stadium; Athens, Georgia	ESPN2	L 21–49	92,746
September 30	11:00 a.m.	at Tulane	Yulman Stadium; New Orleans, LA	ESPN2	L 23–35	20,102
October 7	3:00 p.m.	South Florida	Protective Stadium; Birmingham, AL	ESPN2	W 56–35	23,792
October 14	7:00 p.m.	at UTSA	Alamodome; San Antonio, TX	ESPNU	L 20–41	23,582
October 21	11:00 a.m.	Memphis	Protective Stadium; Birmingham, AL	ESPN2	L 21–45	20,269
November 4	2:00 p.m.	Florida Atlantic^{†}	Protective Stadium; Birmingham, AL	ESPN+	W 45–42	20,676
November 11	2:30 p.m.	at Navy	Memorial Stadium; Annapolis, MD	CBSSN	L 6–31	29,078
November 18	2:00 p.m.	Temple	Protective Stadium; Birmingham, AL	ESPN+	W 34–24	17,486
November 25	1:00 p.m.	at North Texas	DATCU Stadium; Denton, TX	ESPN+	L 42–45	14,628
*Non-conference game; ^{†}Homecoming; Rankings from AP Poll (and CFP Rankings, from the date when issued) - Released prior to game; All times are in Eastern time

== Game summaries ==
=== Louisiana ===
Game Three – Louisiana Ragin' Cajuns (1–1) at UAB Blazers (1–1) – Game summary

Quarter	1	2	3	4	Total
Louisiana	0	24	10	7	41
UAB	0	0	3	18	21

at Protective Stadium • Birmingham, Alabama

- Date: Saturday, September 16, 2023
- Game time: 6:00 p.m. CDT
- Game weather: Sunny • Wind: W 3 MPH
- Game attendance: 21,673
- Referee: Trennis Livingston
- TV announcers (ESPN+): James Westling (play-by-play) and Doc Holiday (analyst)

Game information

First quarter

No scoring plays

Second quarter

- (9:11) LA – Jacob Kibodi 30-yard rush (Kenneth Almendares kick) (Drive: 4 plays, 59 yards, 1:05; Louisiana 7–0)
- (5:35) LA – Zeon Chriss 80-yard rush (Kenneth Almendares kick) (Drive: 1 play, 80 yards, 0:16; Louisiana 14–0)
- (1:06) LA – Zeon Chriss 6-yard rush (Kenneth Almendares kick) (Drive: 7 plays, 75 yards, 2:02; Louisiana 21–0)
- (0:00) LA – Kenneth Almendares 46-yard field goal (Drive: 4 plays, -7 yards, 0:47; Louisiana 24–0)

Third quarter

- (5:46) LA – Kenneth Almendares 37-yard field goal (Drive: 8 plays, 60 yards, 3:56; Louisiana 27–0)
- (2:09) UAB – Matt Quinn 41-yard field goal (Drive: 9 plays, 67 yards, 3:32; Louisiana 27–3)
- (1:02) LA – Terrance Carter 11-yard pass from Zeon Chriss (Kenneth Almendares kick) (Drive: 3 plays, 75 yards, 1:07; Louisiana 34–3)

Fourth quarter

- (7:11) LA – Elijah Davis 2-yard rush (Kenneth Almendares kick) (Drive: 11 plays, 80 yards, 7:39; Louisiana 41–3)
- (4:10) UAB – Jacob Zeno 2-yard rush (two-point pass conversion attempt failed) (Drive: 9 plays, 75 yards, 3:01; Louisiana 41–9)
- (1:33) UAB – Lee Beebe 1-yard rush (two-point pass conversion attempt failed) (Drive: 2 plays, 4 yards, 0:49; Louisiana 41–15)
- (0:10) UAB – Samario Rudolph 17-yard pass from Jacob Zeno (two-point pass conversion attempt failed) (Drive: 7 plays, 28 yards, 1:14; Louisiana 41–21)

Statistics	ULL	UAB
First downs	22	21
Total yards	64–513	73–396
Rushing yards	40–305	35–116
Passing yards	208	280
Passing: Comp–Att–Int	16–24–1	27–38–2
Time of possession	29:05	30:55

Team	Category	Player	Statistics
Louisiana	Passing	Zeon Chriss	14/20, 174 yards, TD
Louisiana	Rushing	Jacob Kibodi	7 carries, 108 yards, TD
Louisiana	Receiving	Harvey Broussard	3 receptions, 65 yards
UAB	Passing	Jacob Zeno	27/38, 280 yards, TD, 2 INT
UAB	Rushing	Jacob Zeno	17 carries, 52 yards, TD
UAB	Receiving	Semario Rudolph	8 receptions, 66 yards, TD

=== at No. 1 Georgia ===
Game Four – UAB Blazers (1–2) at No. 1 Georgia Bulldogs (3–0) – Game summary

Quarter	1	2	3	4	Total
UAB	0	14	0	7	21
No. 1 Georgia	7	21	14	7	49

at Sanford Stadium • Athens, Georgia

- Date: Saturday, September 23, 2023
- Game time: 7:30 p.m. EST
- Game weather: -
- Game attendance: 92,756
- Referee: David Smith
- TV announcers (ESPN2): Brian Custer (play-by-play), Rod Gilmore (color) and Lauren Sisler (sideline)

Game information

First quarter

- (12:04) UGA – Arian Smith 12-yard pass from Carson Beck (Peyton Woodring kick) (Drive: 6 plays, 75 yards, 2:51; Georgia 7–0)

Second quarter

- (14:09) UAB – Bryce Damous 16-yard pass from Jacob Zeno (Matt Quinn kick) (Drive: 4 plays, 36 yards, 0:52; Tied 7–7)
- (10:00) UGA – Daijun Edwards 4-yard run (Peyton Woodring kick) (Drive: 9 plays, 72 yards, 4:04; Georgia 14–7)
- (2:40) UGA – Brock Bowers 41-yard pass from Carson Beck (Peyton Woodring kick) (Drive: 7 plays, 92 yards, 2:32; Georgia 21–7)
- (1:46) UAB – Daijun Edwards 3-yard run (Peyton Woodring kick) (Drive: 4 plays, 25 yards, 1:02; Georgia 28–7)
- (0:08) UAB – Amare Thomas 2-yard pass from Jacob Zeno (Matt Quinn kick) (Drive: 9 plays, 70 yards, 1:12; Georgia 28–14)

Third quarter

- (9:06) UGA – Carson Beck 1-yard run (Peyton Woodring kick) (Drive: 12 plays, 59 yards, 4:38; Georgia 35-14)
- (5:38) UGA – Brock Bowers 10-yard pass from Carson Beck (Peyton Woodring kick) (Drive: 4 plays, 61 yards, 2:14; Georgia 42–14)

Fourth quarter

- (9:05) UGA – Sevaughn Clark 7-yard run (Peyton Woodring kick) (Drive: 8 plays, 75 yards, 3:44; Georgia 49–14)
- (6:08) UAB – Jacob Zeno 3-yard run (Matt Quinn kick) (Drive: 8 plays, 75 yards, 2:57; Georgia 49–21)

Statistics	UAB	UGA
First downs	20	31
Total yards	77–336	76–582
Rushing yards	26–86	36–188
Passing yards	250	394
Passing: Comp–Att–Int	32–51–1	28–40–1
Time of possession	25:35	34:25

Team	Category	Player	Statistics
UAB	Passing	Jacob Zeno	32/51, 250 yards, 2 TD, INT
UAB	Rushing	Isaiah Jacobs	10 carries, 27 yards
UAB	Receiving	Amare Thomas	9 receptions, 60 yards, TD
Georgia	Passing	Carson Beck	22/32, 338 yards, 3 TD
Georgia	Rushing	Daijun Edwards	12 carries, 66 yards, 2 TD
Georgia	Receiving	Brock Bowers	9 receptions, 121 yards, 2 TD

=== at Tulane ===
Game Five – UAB Blazers (1–3) at Tulane Green Wave (3–1) – Game summary

Quarter	1	2	3	4	Total
Blazers	3	17	0	3	23
Green Wave	7	7	14	7	35

at Yulman Stadium, New Orleans, LA

- Date: September 30, 2023
- Game time: 11:00 a.m. CDT
- Game weather: Sunny • Temperature: 85 °F (29 °C) • Wind: NE 14 mph
- Game attendance: 20,102
- Referee: Luke Richmond
- TV announcers (ESPN2): Roy Philpott (play-by-play), Roddy Jones (color), Alex Chappell (sideline)

Game information

First Quarter

- (9:19) UAB – Matt Quinn 31-yard field goal (Drive: 11 plays, 65 yards, 5:36; UAB 3–0)
- (2:50) TUL – Yulkeith Brown 15-yard run, Valentino Ambrosio kick (Drive: 6 plays, 52 yards, 2:01; Tulane 7–3)

Second Quarter

- (13:08) UAB – Isaiah Jacobs 2-yard run, Matt Quinn kick (Drive: 12 plays, 75 yards, 4:42; UAB 10–7)
- (10:15) UAB – Isaiah Jacobs 17-yard run, Matt Quinn kick (Drive: 2 plays, 24 yards, 0:39; UAB 17–7)
- (5:05) UAB – Matt Quinn 48-yard field goal (Drive: 8 plays, 37 yards, 3:38; UAB 20–7)
- (0:46) TUL – Makhi Hughes 1-yard run, Valentino Armbrosio kick (Drive: 9 plays, 75 yards, 4:19; UAB 20–14)

Third Quarter

- (13:35) TUL – Makhi Hughes 18-yard run, Valentino Armbrosio kick (Drive: 3 plays, 63 yards, 1:18; Tulane 21–20)
- (2:50) TUL – Alex Bauman 14-yard pass from Michael Pratt, Valentino Ambrosio kick (Drive: 5 plays, 56 yards, 1:55; Tulane 28–20)

Fourth Quarter

- (5:05) UAB – Matt Quinn 36-yard field goal (Drive: 9 plays, 55 yards, 3:08; Tulane 28–23)
- (0:47) TUL – Lawrence Keys III 32-yard pass from Michael Pratt, Valentino Ambrosio kick (Drive: 9 plays, 61 yards, 3:55; Tulane 35–23)

Win Probability

- Tulane 80.4%

Line

- Tulane –22.5

Over/Under

- 59.5

Statistics	UAB	TUL
First downs	25	24
Total yards	434	448
Rushing yards	170	264
Passing yards	264	184
Turnovers	1	2
Time of possession	30:05	29:55

Team	Category	Player	Statistics
UAB	Passing	Jacob Zeno	27/35, 236 yards
UAB	Rushing	Isaiah Jacobs	18 carries, 95 yards, 2 TD
UAB	Receiving	Amare Thomas	8 receptions, 99 yards
Tulane	Passing	Michael Pratt	14/23, 184 yards, 2 TD
Tulane	Rushing	Makhi Hughes	22 carries, 123 yards, 2 TD
Tulane	Receiving	Lawrence Keys III	3 receptions, 54 yards, 1 TD

=== at Navy ===
Game Ten – UAB Blazers (3–6) at Navy Midshipmen (3–5) – Game summary

Quarter	1	2	3	4	Total
Blazers	3	3	0	0	6
Midshipmen	7	0	3	21	31

at Navy-Marine Corps Memorial Stadium • Annapolis, Maryland

- Date: November 11th
- Game time: 2:30 p.m. CST
- Game weather: Temperature: 54 °F (12 °C) • Wind: SW at 5 miles per hour (8.0 km/h) • Weather: Clear
- Game attendance: 29,078
- Referee: Kevin Randell
- TV announcers (CBSSN): John Sadack (play-by-play), Randy Cross (analyst) & Sheehan Stanwick Burch (sideline reporter)

Game information

First quarter

- (2:49) NAVY – Regis Velez 45-yard pass from Xavier Arline, Nathan Kirkwood kick (Drive: 5 plays, 70 yards, 2:34; Navy 7-0)
- (0:30) UAB – Matt Quinn 37-yard field goal (Drive: 6 plays, 51 yards, 2:19; Navy 7-3)

Second quarter

- (6:22) UAB – Matt Quinn 29-yard field goal (Drive: 11 plays, 59 yards, 6:25; Navy 7-6)

Third quarter

- (9:13) NAVY – Nathan Kirkwood 31-yard field goal (Drive: 5 plays, 17 yards, 2:46; Navy 10-6)

Fourth quarter

- (10:08) NAVY – Daba Fofana 2-yard run, Nathan Kirkwood kick (Drive: 20 plays, 80 yards, 12:44; Navy 17-6)
- (4:12) NAVY – Xavier Arline 50-yard run, Nathan Kirkwood kick (Drive: 5 plays, 86 yards, 2:34; Navy 24-6)
- (2:03) NAVY – Rayuan Lane 97-yard interception, Nathan Kirkwood kick (Drive: 8 plays, 63 yards, 2:09; Navy 31-6)

Statistics	UAB	Navy
First downs	19	16
Plays–yards	66–321	57–363
Rushes–yards	30–115	47–269
Passing yards	206	94
Passing: comp–att–int	25–36–2	7–10–1
Time of possession	26:45	33:15

Team	Category	Player	Statistics
UAB	Passing	Jacob Zeno	25/36, 206 yards, 2 INT
UAB	Rushing	Jermaine Brown, Jr.	15 carries, 55 yards
UAB	Receiving	Bryce Damous	1 reception, 42 yards
Navy	Passing	Xavier Arline	7/10, 94 yards, TD, INT
Navy	Rushing	Xavier Arline	19 carries, 109 yards, TD
Navy	Receiving	Regis Velez	1 reception, 45 yards, TD

== Personnel ==
=== NFL departures ===
One Blazer was selected in the 2023 NFL draft.

Player	Position	Team	Round	Pick
DeWayne McBride	RB	Minnesota Vikings	7	222

=== Outgoing transfers ===
Player	Position	Destination
Antwan Massie	CB	Unknown
Maleak Bryant	TE	LIU
Mike York	TE	Valparaiso
Dylan Hopkins	QB	New Mexico
Dylan Mehrota	QB	Southern
Quincy McGee	IOL	Ole Miss
Tyetus Smith-Lindsey	RB	Nicholls
Brody Dalton	TE	Troy
Damon Stewart	QB	Alabama State
Codey Martin	CB	Lamar
Charles Daniels	LB	Unknown
Xavier Lanier	CB	Tulsa
Jordan Palmer	WR	Unknown
Jaylen Key	S	Alabama
A.J. Gates	RB	Alabama State
Kybo Jamerson	LB	Lamar

=== Incoming transfers ===
Player	Position	Previous team
Armani Diamond	CB	Auburn
Brian Mayes	CB	Incarnate Word
Landry Lyddy	QB	Louisiana Tech
Dazalin Worsham	WR	Auburn
Malachi Holt-Bennett	WR	Indiana
James Smyre	LB	Marshall
Will Parker	OT	Tennessee
Brandon Buckhaulter	WR	Ole Miss
Antavious Woody	IOL	Florida State
Andrew Ogletree	DL	Alabama State
