= Jonathan Brewer =

American football coach (born 1987)

Current position
- Title: Offensive coordinator & quarterbacks coach
- Team: Duke
- Conference: ACC

Biographical details
- Born: July 23, 1987 (age 39); Rogers, Arkansas, U.S.
- Education: University of Arkansas (2010); Auburn University (2014)

Coaching career (HC unless noted)
- 2013–2015: Auburn (GA)
- 2016: Auburn (OA)
- 2017: UConn (OA)
- 2018–2019: SMU (OQC/OA)
- 2020–2021: Miami (FL) (OQC)
- 2022: SMU (QB)
- 2023: SMU (co-OC/QB)
- 2024–present: Duke (OC/QB)

Jonathan Brewer (born July 23, 1987) is an American football coach who is currently the offensive coordinator and quarterbacks coach for the Duke Blue Devils.

== Coaching career ==
Brewer got his first career coaching job in 2013 as a graduate assistant for the Auburn Tigers. For the 2016 season, Brewer was promoted by the Tigers to become an offensive analyst for the team. In 2017, Brewer decided to join the UConn Huskies as an offensive analyst for the team. For the 2018 season, Brewer was hired by the SMU Mustangs to serve as an offensive quality control coach and offensive analyst. In 2020, Brewer was hired by the Miami Hurricanes to serve as an offensive quality control coach. In 2022, Brewer re-joined SMU this time as the team's quarterbacks coach. After the 2022 season, Brewer was promoted by the Mustangs to serve as the team's co-offensive coordinator and quarterbacks coach. On March 26, 2024, Brewer was named the offensive coordinator and quarterbacks coach for the Duke Blue Devils.
