= Isaiah Nwokobia =

American football player (born 2002)

Profile
- Position: Safety

Personal information
- Born: December 16, 2002 (age 23)
- Listed height: 6 ft 0 in (1.83 m)
- Listed weight: 206 lb (93 kg)

Career information
- High school: Skyline (Dallas, Texas)
- College: SMU (2021–2025)
- NFL draft: 2026: undrafted

Career history
- Cincinnati Bengals (2026)*
- * Offseason or practice squad member only

Awards and highlights
- First-team All-ACC (2024); American Athletic Conference Football Championship Game MVP (2023)
- Stats at Pro Football Reference

Isaiah Nwokobia (born December 16, 2002) is an American professional football safety. He played college football for the SMU Mustangs.

== Early life ==
Nwokobia Skyline High School in Dallas, Texas. He was rated as a three star recruit, where he committed to play college football for the SMU Mustangs over other offers from Arizona, Baylor, and Texas.

== College career ==
In week 2 of the 2021 season, Nwokobia recorded a sack and an interception in a victory versus North Texas. In his freshman season in 2021, he totaled 22 tackles with two being for a loss, a sack, a pass deflections, two interceptions, and a forced fumble. During the 2022 season, Nwokobia played in just four games due to nagging injuries, causing him to redshirt. In the 2023 American Athletic Conference Football Championship Game, he recorded an interception as he helped the Mustangs to a conference title win over Tulane. Nwokobia finished the 2023 season, playing in all 14 games with ten starts, notching 61 tackles with four and a half being for a loss, a sack, three pass deflections, and two touchdowns. In the 2024 season, he started in all 14 games, putting up 100 tackles with three and a half being for a loss, three pass deflections, and three interceptions, earning first-team all-ACC honors. Instead of declaring for the 2025 NFL draft, Nwokobia returned to SMU for his final season of eligibility.

== Professional career ==
Pre-draft measurables
Height	Weight	Arm length	Hand span
6 ft 0 3/8 in (1.84 m)	206 lb (93 kg)	31 1/8 in (0.79 m)	9 5/8 in (0.24 m)
All values from Pro Day

On May 8, 2026, Nwokobia signed with the Cincinnati Bengals. He was waived by the Bengals on August 4. On September 29, Nwokobia was signed to the practice squad. He was released on October 20.
