= Rhett Lashlee =

American college football coach (born 1983)

Current position
- Title: Head coach
- Team: SMU
- Conference: ACC
- Record: 45–20

Biographical details
- Born: June 9, 1983 (age 43); Springdale, Arkansas, U.S.

Playing career
- 2002–2004: Arkansas
- Position: Quarterback

Coaching career (HC unless noted)
- 2004–2005: Springdale HS (AR) (QB)
- 2006: Arkansas (GA)
- 2009–2010: Auburn (GA)
- 2011: Samford (OC/QB)
- 2012: Arkansas State (OC/QB)
- 2013–2016: Auburn (OC/QB)
- 2017: UConn (OC/QB)
- 2018–2019: SMU (OC/QB)
- 2020–2021: Miami (FL) (OC/QB)
- 2022–present: SMU

Head coaching record
- Overall: 45–20
- Bowls: 1–2
- Tournaments: 0–1 (CFP)

Accomplishments and honors

Championships
- As a head coach 1 AAC (2023) As an assistant coach 1 National (2010); 2 SEC (2010, 2013); 2 SEC Western Division (2010, 2013); 1 Sun Belt (2012)

Awards
- As a head coach ACC Coach of the Year (2024)

Rhett Lashlee (born June 9, 1983) is an American college football coach who is the head coach at Southern Methodist University. He previously served as the offensive coordinator and quarterbacks coach at Auburn University from 2013 to 2016 and offensive coordinator and quarterbacks coach at the University of Miami from 2020 to 2021.

Lashlee played college football at the University of Arkansas as a quarterback from 2002 to 2004. Prior to his tenure at SMU, he held various assistant coaching positions both at the high school (namely, Springdale High School in Arkansas) and collegiate levels (including Arkansas, Auburn, Samford, Arkansas State, UConn, SMU, and Miami).

== Playing career ==
=== High school ===
Lashlee attended Shiloh Christian School in Springdale, Arkansas, where he played quarterback under head coach Gus Malzahn. Lashlee posted a state-record 40 career wins (40–3–2 as a starter) and he led his team to three straight state championship games, winning two titles.

Lashlee holds a number of Arkansas high school records.

- 171 career touchdown passes (#4 nationally)
- 672 passing yards in a game (#12 nationally)

Regarded as a three-star recruit by Rivals.com, Lashlee was ranked as the No. 19 pro-style quarterback in a 2002 class that also featured Ben Olson, Trent Edwards, Drew Stanton, and Matt Moore.

=== College ===
Lashlee played college football for the Arkansas Razorbacks. Lashlee was a backup quarterback to Matt Jones, from 2002 to 2004 for the Razorbacks. A shoulder injury ended his playing career. Lashlee graduated from the University of Arkansas in 2006.

== Coaching career ==
=== Early career ===
Lashlee is from the Gus Malzahn coaching tree and worked exclusively under him prior to 2017, with the exception of his one year at Samford University.

From 2004 to 2005, Lashlee worked with the quarterbacks at Springdale High School. Following the announcement of Malzahn's hire as Arkansas Razorbacks offensive coordinator in 2006, Lashlee was hired as an offensive graduate assistant. Following this season, Malzahn left to become the offensive coordinator of the Tulsa Golden Hurricane football team. Although invited to join Malzahn's staff at Tulsa, Lashlee left coaching and remained in Northwest Arkansas. Instead, Lashlee and his brother-in-law wrote, published, and marketed High School Sports The Magazine (later renamed Vype), a publication based on high school sports in Arkansas. During the two years Lashlee was involved in the business, he made relationships with high school coaches throughout Arkansas and marketed his magazine to distributors. Lashlee volunteered as quarterbacks coach at Har-Ber High School when his schedule would allow. Malzahn was hired as the offensive coordinator at Auburn for the 2009 season. Following this announcement, Malzahn offered Lashlee to join his staff as a graduate assistant, returning Lashlee to coaching.

=== Samford ===
In 2011, Lashlee joined Samford University as their offensive coordinator and quarterbacks coach. During his first and only season at Samford, Lashlee improved the team's offense in points per game (17 to 26), total offense (57 to 46 ranking nationally), and improved their record from 4–6 to 6–5 through the installation of a high tempo offense.

=== Arkansas State ===
In 2012, Lashlee was hired by Arkansas State University as their offensive coordinator and quarterbacks coach following head coach Gus Malzahn after his departure from Auburn.

=== Auburn ===
On December 6, 2012, Lashlee was hired at Auburn University as their offensive coordinator and quarterbacks coach following Gus Malzahn after his return to Auburn after one year at Arkansas State. In 2013, Lashlee was a finalist for the Broyles Award, given annually to the nation's top college football assistant coach.

=== UConn ===
In 2017, Lashlee joined the University of Connecticut as their offensive coordinator and quarterbacks coach.

=== SMU ===
On January 4, 2018, Lashlee was hired as the offensive coordinator and quarterbacks coach at Southern Methodist University (SMU).

=== Miami ===
On January 3, 2020, Lashlee was hired as the offensive coordinator and quarterbacks coach at the University of Miami under head coach Manny Diaz.

=== SMU (second stint) ===
On November 30, 2021, Lashlee was named head coach at Southern Methodist University (SMU), replacing Sonny Dykes after he left SMU to become the head coach at rival Texas Christian University (TCU). After three successful seasons and a successful first half of 2025, Lashlee and SMU agreed to a two-year extension.

== Personal life ==
Lashlee is a Christian. He is married to Lauren Lashlee (née Lee), and they have four children together.

== Head coaching record ==
Year	Team	Overall	Conference	Standing	Bowl/playoffs	Coaches^{#}	AP^{°}
SMU Mustangs (American Athletic Conference) (2022–2023)
2022	SMU	7–6	5–3	T–4th	L New Mexico		
2023	SMU	11–3	8–0	T–1st	L Fenway	24	22
SMU Mustangs (Atlantic Coast Conference) (2024–present)
2024	SMU	11–3	8–0	1st	L CFP First Round^{†}	11	12
2025	SMU	9–4	6–2	T–2nd	W Holiday		
2026	SMU	7–4	5–3				
SMU:		45–20	32–8				
Total:		45–20					
National championship Conference title Conference division title or championship game berth
^{†}Indicates CFP / New Years' Six bowl.; ^{#}Rankings from final Coaches Poll.; ^{°}Rankings from final AP Poll.

== See also ==
- 2006 Arkansas Razorbacks football team
- 2011 Samford Bulldogs football team
