= R. J. Maryland =

American football player (born 2004)

Profile
- Position: Tight end

Personal information
- Born: July 9, 2004 (age 22); Southlake, Texas, U.S.
- Listed height: 6 ft 4 in (1.93 m)
- Listed weight: 236 lb (107 kg)

Career information
- High school: Carroll Senior (Southlake, Texas)
- College: SMU (2022–2025)
- NFL draft: 2026: undrafted

Career history
- Green Bay Packers (2026)*
- * Offseason or practice squad member only
- Stats at Pro Football Reference

Russell James Maryland Jr. (born July 9, 2004) is an American professional football tight end. He played college football for the SMU Mustangs and he was signed as an undrafted free agent by the Packers in 2026.

== Early life ==
Maryland attended Carroll Senior High School in Southlake, Texas. He was rated as a three-star recruit and committed to play college football for the Boston College Eagles. However, Maryland later flipped his commitment to play for the SMU Mustangs.

== College career ==
As a freshman in 2022, Maryland notched 28 receptions for 296 yards and two touchdowns. In 2023, he totaled 54 receptions for 518 yards and seven touchdowns, earning first-team all-American Athletic Conference (AAC) honors. In the 2024 season opener, Maryland hauled in eight receptions for 162 yards and a touchdown in a win over Nevada, garnering ACC receiver of the week honors.

== Professional career ==
Pre-draft measurables
| Height | Weight | Arm length | Hand span | Wingspan | 40-yard dash | 10-yard split | 20-yard split | 20-yard shuttle | Vertical jump | Broad jump | Bench press |
|---|---|---|---|---|---|---|---|---|---|---|---|
| 6 ft 4 1/8 in (1.93 m) | 236 lb (107 kg) | 32 1/4 in (0.82 m) | 9 in (0.23 m) | 6 ft 6 3/4 in (2.00 m) | 4.51 s | 1.64 s | 2.70 s | 4.37 s | 33.0 in (0.84 m) | 10 ft 2 in (3.10 m) | 16 reps |
All values from NFL Combine/Pro Day

Maryland was signed as an undrafted free agent by the Green Bay Packers after the conclusion of the 2026 NFL draft. He was waived by the Packers on August 14 with an injury settlement.

== Personal life ==
Maryland is the son of former NFL defensive tackle Russell Maryland.
