= 2024 East Carolina Pirates football team =

American college football season

2024 East Carolina Pirates football

Military Bowl champion

Military Bowl, W 26–21 vs. NC State
- Conference: American Athletic Conference
- Record: 8–5 (5–3 AAC)
- Head coach: Mike Houston (6th season; first 7 games); Blake Harrell (interim; remainder of season)
- Offensive coordinator: John David Baker (1st season)
- Offensive scheme: Veer and shoot
- Defensive coordinator: Blake Harrell (5th season)
- Base defense: 3–4 or 4–2–5
- Home stadium: Dowdy–Ficklen Stadium

2024 American Athletic Conference football standings
	Conf.			Overall
Team	W		L	W		L
No. 21 Army y$	8	–	0	12	–	2
Tulane y	7	–	1	9	–	5
Navy	6	–	2	10	–	3
No. 24 Memphis	6	–	2	11	–	2
East Carolina	5	–	3	8	–	5
South Florida	4	–	4	7	–	6
UTSA	4	–	4	7	–	6
Charlotte	4	–	4	5	–	7
North Texas	3	–	5	6	–	7
Rice	3	–	5	4	–	8
Temple	2	–	6	3	–	9
UAB	2	–	6	3	–	9
Florida Atlantic	1	–	7	3	–	9
Tulsa	1	–	7	3	–	9
Championship: Army 35, Tulane 14
$ – Conference champion; y – Championship game participant; Rankings from AP Poll

The 2024 East Carolina Pirates football team represented East Carolina University in the American Athletic Conference (AAC) during the 2024 NCAA Division I FBS football season. The Pirates were led by Mike Houston in his sixth year as the head coach for the team's first seven games. The Pirates played their home games at Dowdy-Ficklen Stadium, located in Greenville, North Carolina.

On October 20, head coach Mike Houston was fired after back-to-back blowout losses to Charlotte and Army. Defensive coordinator Blake Harrell was named the team's interim head coach.

== Offseason ==
=== Transfers ===
Outgoing
Player	Position	New school
Zion Agnew	WR	Lenoir–Rhyne
Omari Allen	IOL	Hampton
O'Mega Blake	WR	Charlotte
Shane Calhoun	TE	Texas A&M
Ryan Capriotti	K	Maryland
David Chapeau	P	Central Michigan
Rance Conner	CB	Valdosta State
Grant Copeland	IOL	Lenoir–Rhyne
Ra Ra Dillworth	LB	Baylor
Dru Dotter	CB	Catawba
Kamarro Edmonds	RB	Johnson C. Smith
Antonio Ferguson	TE	FIU
Isaiah Foote	OT	Western Illinois
Mason Garcia	QB	Austin Peay
Colby Garfield	LS	Ohio
Gerald Green	RB	Troy
Antione Jackson	CB	UCF
Teylor Jackson	LB	Liberty
Ryan King	WR	Montana State
Tyquan King	LB	Temple
Laith Marjan	K	South Alabama
Joseph McKay	RB	Valdosta State
Xavier McIver	DL	UT Martin
Ty Moss	S	Tennessee Tech
Richard Pearce	IOL	New Mexico
Elisha Samples	IOL	Wofford
Qae'shon Sapp	IOL	SMU
Jason Shuford	DL	Marshall
Kendarius Small	OT	Jacksonville State
Carson Smith	K	Austin Peay
Rico Watkins	CB	Unknown
Teagan Wilk	S	Houston
Brock Winstead	LS	East Tennessee State
Jamari Young	LB	Gardner–Webb

Incoming
Player	Position	Previous school
Noah Perez	K	Akron
Conner Maynard	P	Appalachian State
Shane Perry	LB	Barton
Panda Askew	OL	Charlotte
Qae'shon Sapp	IOL	Florida State
Winston Wright Jr.	WR	Florida State
Bryson Harrison	QB	Georgia State
Karson Jones	IOL	Houston
Noah Holmes	LB	James Madison
Jayson Tarpeh	OL	Lackawanna
Ryheem Craig	DL	Louisville
Gage Reale	TE	Louisville
Darius Bell	OT	Maine
Gavin Gibson	CB	Maryland
Katin Houser	QB	Michigan State
Jake Garcia	QB	Missouri
Dameon Wilson	LB	Missouri
Anthony Smith	WR	NC State
Ayden Duncanson	S	North Carolina
Jaden McKenzie	DL	Ohio State
Jayvontay Conner	TE	Ole Miss
Casey Kelly	TE	Oregon
London Montgomery	RB	Penn State
O'Mega Blake	WR	South Carolina
Andrew Wilson-Lamp	CB	West Virginia

== Schedule ==
Date	Time	Opponent	Site	TV	Result	Attendance
August 31	6:00 p.m.	Norfolk State*	Dowdy–Ficklen Stadium; Greenville, NC	ESPN+	W 42–3	36,467
September 7	6:00 p.m.	at Old Dominion*	S.B. Ballard Stadium; Norfolk, VA	ESPN+	W 20–14	21,944
September 14	4:00 p.m.	Appalachian State*	Dowdy–Ficklen Stadium; Greenville, NC	ESPNU	L 19–21	46,117
September 21	6:00 p.m.	at Liberty*	Williams Stadium; Lynchburg, VA	ESPN+	L 24–35	24,076
September 28	4:00 p.m.	UTSA	Dowdy–Ficklen Stadium; Greenville, NC	ESPN+	W 30–20	41,851
October 5	3:30 p.m.	at Charlotte	Jerry Richardson Stadium; Charlotte, NC	ESPNU	L 24–55	17,102
October 19	12:00 p.m.	at No. 23 Army	Michie Stadium; West Point, NY	ESPN2	L 28–45	29,044
October 26	2:00 p.m.	Temple	Dowdy–Ficklen Stadium; Greenville, NC	ESPN+	W 56–34	33,744
November 7	8:00 p.m.	Florida Atlantic	Dowdy–Ficklen Stadium; Greenville, NC	ESPN2	W 49–14	30,573
November 14	7:30 p.m.	at Tulsa	Skelly Field at H. A. Chapman Stadium; Tulsa, OK	ESPN	W 38–31	17,979
November 23	3:30 p.m.	at North Texas	DATCU Stadium; Denton, TX	ESPN+	W 40–28	17,387
November 29	12:00 p.m.	Navy	Dowdy–Ficklen Stadium; Greenville, NC	ESPN	L 20–34	35,663
December 28	5:45 p.m.	vs. NC State*	Navy–Marine Corps Memorial Stadium; Annapolis, MD (Military Bowl / rivalry)	ESPN	W 26–21	23,981
*Non-conference game; Rankings from AP Poll - Released prior to game; All times are in Eastern time

== Game summaries ==
=== Norfolk State (FCS) ===
Norfolk State Spartans (FCS) (0–1) at East Carolina Pirates (0–0) – Game summary

Quarter	1	2	3	4	Total
Spartans (FCS)	3	0	0	0	3
Pirates	14	14	7	7	42

at Dowdy–Ficklen Stadium • Greenville, North Carolina

- Date: August 31st
- Game time: 6:00 p.m. EDT
- Game weather: Cloudy • Temperature: 85 °F (29 °C) • Wind: SE at 3 miles per hour (4.8 km/h)
- Game attendance: 36,467
- Referee: Matt Overton
- TV announcers (ESPN+): Joe Tordy (play-by-play), Reggie Walker Jr. (analyst)

Game information

First quarter

- (8:17) NORF – Grandin Willcox 39 yard field goal (Drive: 10 plays, 34 yards, 5:26; Norfolk State 3–0)
- (6:31) ECU – Casey Kelly 22 yard pass from Jake Garcia, Andrew Conrad kick (Drive: 7 plays, 45 yards, 1:37; East Carolina 7–3)
- (3:47) ECU – Javious Bond 14 yard run, Andrew Conrad kick (Drive: 4 plays, 76 yards, 1:03; East Carolina 14–3)

Second quarter

- (13:35) ECU – Gavin Gibson 30 yard interception return, Andrew Conrad kick (East Carolina 21–3)
- (3:47) ECU – Desirrio Riles 3 yard pass from Jake Garcia, Andrew Conrad kick (Drive: 5 plays, 21 yards, 1:51; East Carolina 28–3)

Third quarter

- (10:07) ECU – Anthony Smith 18 yard pass from Jake Garcia, Andrew Conrad kick (Drive: 4 plays, 40 yards, 1:23; East Carolina 35–3)

Fourth quarter

- (10:12) ECU – Desirrio Riles 32 yard pass from Jake Garcia, Andrew Conrad kick (Drive: 7 plays, 72 yards, 2:17; East Carolina 42–3)

Statistics	NORF	ECU
First downs	7	31
Plays–yards	64–114	74–506
Rushes–yards	45–43	35–148
Passing yards	71	358
Passing: Comp–Att–Int	8–19–1	26–39–3
Time of possession	36:25	23:35

Team	Category	Player	Statistics
Norfolk State	Passing	Jalen Daniels	8/19, 71 yards, 1 INT
Norfolk State	Rushing	Kevon King	5 carries, 26 yards
Norfolk State	Receiving	Jacquez Jones	3 receptions, 31 yards
East Carolina	Passing	Jake Garcia	23/36, 308 yards, 4 TD, 3 INT
East Carolina	Rushing	London Montgomery	14 carries, 67 yards
East Carolina	Receiving	Anthony Smith	5 receptions, 86 yards, 1 TD

=== at Old Dominion ===
East Carolina Pirates (1–0) at Old Dominion Monarchs (0–1) – Game summary

Quarter	1	2	3	4	Total
Pirates	6	0	11	3	20
Monarchs	0	7	7	0	14

at S.B. Ballard Stadium • Norfolk, Virginia

- Date: September 7th
- Game time: 6:00 p.m. EDT
- Game weather: Cloudy • Temperature: 77 °F (25 °C) • Wind: SW at 8 miles per hour (13 km/h)
- Game attendance: 21,944
- Referee: Edwin Lee
- TV announcers (ESPN+): Chip Tarkenton (play-by-play), Andy Mashaw (analyst)

Game information

First quarter

- (11:45) ECU – Rahjai Harris 22 yard run, kick failed (Drive: 10 plays, 80 yards, 3:10; East Carolina 6–0)

Second quarter

- (9:24) ODU – Kelby Williams 44 yard pass from Grant Wilson, Ethan Sanchez kick (Drive: 1 play, 34 yards, 0:35; Old Dominion 7–6)

Third quarter

- (10:42) ECU – Rahjai Harris 63 yard run, 2-point pass (Drive: 5 plays, 80 yards, 1:48; East Carolina 14–7)
- (9:07) ECU – Andrew Conrad 33 yard field goal (Drive: 4 plays, 5 yards, 1:32; East Carolina 17–7)
- (4:11) ODU – Aaron Young 1 yard run, Ethan Sanchez kick (Drive: 13 plays, 75 yards, 4:56; East Carolina 17–14)

Fourth quarter

- (9:09) ECU – Andrew Conrad 50 yard field goal (Drive: 8 plays, 21 yards, 2:54; East Carolina 20–14)

Statistics	ECU	ODU
First downs	26	17
Plays–yards	89–466	75–287
Rushes–yards	51–183	41–95
Passing yards	283	192
Passing: Comp–Att–Int	25–38–4	20–34–1
Time of possession	32:47	27:13

Team	Category	Player	Statistics
East Carolina	Passing	Jake Garcia	25/38, 283 yards, 4 INT
East Carolina	Rushing	Rahjai Harris	26 carries, 131 yards, 2 TD
East Carolina	Receiving	Anthony Smith	5 receptions, 70 yards
Old Dominion	Passing	Grant Wilson	20/34, 192 yards, 1 TD, 1 INT
Old Dominion	Rushing	Aaron Young	25 carries, 83 yards, 1 TD
Old Dominion	Receiving	Diante Vines	6 receptions, 64 yards

=== Appalachian State ===
Appalachian State Mountaineers (1–1) at East Carolina Pirates (2–0) – Game summary

Quarter	1	2	3	4	Total
Mountaineers	0	14	7	0	21
Pirates	16	0	0	3	19

at Dowdy–Ficklen Stadium • Greenville, North Carolina

- Date: September 14th
- Game time: 4:00 p.m. EDT
- Game weather: Sunny • Temperature: 77 °F (25 °C) • Wind: NE at 15 miles per hour (24 km/h)
- Game attendance: 46,117
- Referee: Kevin Randall
- TV announcers (ESPNU): Mike Corey (play-by-play), Rene Ingoglia (analyst)

Game information

First quarter

- (14:29) ECU – Winston Wright Jr. 65 yard pass from Jake Garcia, Andrew Conrad kick (Drive: 3 plays, 75 yards, 0:31; East Carolina 7–0)
- (6:33) ECU – Andrew Conrad 48 yard field goal (Drive: 12 plays, 50 yards, 5:15; East Carolina 10–0)
- (4:55) ECU – Shavon Revel 50 yard interception return, kick failed (East Carolina 16–0)

Second quarter

- (14:17) APP – Eli Wilson 6 yard pass from Joey Aguilar, 2-point pass (Drive: 13 plays, 75 yards, 5:38; East Carolina 16–8)
- (7:00) APP – Michael Hughes 28 yard field goal (Drive: 10 plays, 71 yards, 5:52; East Carolina 16–11)
- (0:09) APP – Michael Hughes 35 yard field goal (Drive: 7 plays, 55 yards, 0:55; East Carolina 16–14)

Third quarter

- (0:41) APP – Makai Jackson 36 yard pass from Joey Aguilar, Michael Hughes kick (Drive: 4 plays, 56 yards, 1:24; Appalachian State 21–16)

Fourth quarter

- (12:39) ECU – Andrew Conrad 43 yard field goal (Drive: 12 plays, 50 yards, 3:10; Appalachian State 21–19)

Statistics	APP	ECU
First downs	25	16
Plays–yards	83–505	58–324
Rushes–yards	36–81	30–98
Passing yards	424	226
Passing: Comp–Att–Int	32–47–2	18–28–1
Time of possession	39:00	21:00

Team	Category	Player	Statistics
Appalachian State	Passing	Joey Aguilar	32/47, 424 yards, 2 TD, 2 INT
Appalachian State	Rushing	Anderson Castle	17 carries, 40 yards
Appalachian State	Receiving	Kaedin Robinson	7 receptions, 129 yards
East Carolina	Passing	Jake Garcia	18/28, 226 yards, 1 TD, 1 INT
East Carolina	Rushing	Rahjai Harris	18 carries, 87 yards
East Carolina	Receiving	Winston Wright Jr.	3 receptions, 72 yards, 1 TD

=== at Liberty ===
East Carolina Pirates (2–1) at Liberty Flames (3–0) – Game summary

Quarter	1	2	3	4	Total
Pirates	14	3	7	0	24
Flames	0	7	14	14	35

at Williams Stadium • Lynchburg, Virginia

- Date: September 21st
- Game time: 6:00 p.m. EDT
- Game weather: Temperature: 80 °F (27 °C) • Wind: SW at 6 miles per hour (9.7 km/h) • Weather: Rain
- Game attendance: 24,076
- Referee: Ron Hudson
- TV announcers (ESPN+): Matt Warner (play-by-play), Joe Jauch (analyst) and Emily Austen (sideline)

Game information

First quarter

- (9:52) ECU – Jake Garcia 6 yard run, Andrew Conrad kick (Drive: 10 plays, 68 yards, 3:35; East Carolina 7–0)
- (3:18) ECU – Marlon Gunn Jr. 1 yard run, Andrew Conrad kick (Drive: 1 play, 1 yard, 0:05; East Carolina 14–0)

Second quarter

- (11:52) ECU – Andrew Conrad 35 yard field goal (Drive: 10 plays, 23 yards, 4:31; East Carolina 17–0)
- (2:53) LIB – Elijah Canion 14 yard pass from Kaidon Salter, Colin Karhu kick (Drive: 12 plays, 80 yards, 6:32; East Carolina 17–7)

Third quarter

- (9:16) LIB – Reese Smith 17 yard pass from Kaidon Salter, Colin Karhu kick (Drive: 11 plays, 75 yards, 5:44; East Carolina 17–14)
- (2:52) LIB – Reese Smith 14 yard pass from Kaidon Salter, Colin Karhu kick (Drive: 9 plays, 69 yards, 4:27; Liberty 21–17)
- (0:41) ECU – Rahjai Harris 44 yard run, Andrew Conrad kick (Drive: 7 plays, 52 yards, 2:03; East Carolina 24–21)

Fourth quarter

- (8:10) LIB – Reese Smith 15 yard pass from Kaidon Salter, Colin Karhu kick (Drive: 16 plays, 75 yards, 7:31; Liberty 28–24)
- (2:00) LIB – Quinton Cooley 21 yard run, Colin Karhu kick (Drive: 10 plays, 77 yards, 4:05; Liberty 35–24)

Statistics	ECU	LIB
First downs	21	26
Plays–yards	68–331	77–414
Rushes–yards	32–127	45–191
Passing yards	204	223
Passing: Comp–Att–Int	20–36–1	19–32–1
Time of possession	23:17	36:43

Team	Category	Player	Statistics
East Carolina	Passing	Jake Garcia	20/36, 204 yards, 1 INT
East Carolina	Rushing	Rahjai Harris	13 carries, 47 yards, 1 TD
East Carolina	Receiving	Chase Sowell	5 receptions, 72 yards
Liberty	Passing	Kaidon Salter	19/32, 223 yards, 4 TD, 1 INT
Liberty	Rushing	Quinton Cooley	19 carries, 105 yards, 1 TD
Liberty	Receiving	Reese Smith	6 receptions, 80 yards, 3 TD

=== UTSA ===
UTSA Roadrunners (2–2) at East Carolina Pirates (2–2) – Game summary

Quarter	1	2	3	4	Total
Roadrunners	10	3	0	7	20
Pirates	3	7	14	6	30

at Dowdy–Ficklen Stadium • Greenville, North Carolina

- Date: September 28th
- Game time: 4:00 p.m. EDT
- Game weather: Sunny • Temperature: 85 °F (29 °C) • Wind: SW at 9 miles per hour (14 km/h)
- Game attendance: 41,851
- Referee: Tim Rich
- TV announcers (ESPN+): Richard Cross (play-by-play) and Reggie Walker (analyst)

Game information

First quarter

- (11:05) ECU – Noah Perez 21-yard field goal (Drive: 5 plays, 44 yards, 1:47; East Carolina 3–0)
- (9:55) UTSA – Chase Allen 23-yard field goal (Drive: 6 plays, 70 yards, 1:10; Tied 3–3)
- (3:43) UTSA – Oscar Cardenas 5-yard pass from Owen McCown, Chase Allen kick (Drive: 10 plays, 80 yards, 4:37; UTSA 10–3)

Second quarter

- (3:05) UTSA – Chase Allen 35-yard field goal (Drive: 14 plays, 75 yards, 7:16; East Carolina 13–3)
- (0:36) ECU – Jake Garcia 3-yard run, Noah Perez kick (Drive: 8 plays, 75 yards, 2:29; UTSA 13–10)

Third quarter

- (10:45) ECU – Winston Wright Jr. 40-yard pass from Jake Garcia, Noah Perez kick (Drive: 7 plays, 64 yards, 2:01; East Carolina 17–13)
- (0:49) ECU – Anthony Smith 53-yard pass from Jake Garcia, Noah Perez kick (Drive: 7 plays, 85 yards, 2:18; East Carolina 24–13)

Fourth quarter

- (11:51) ECU – Noah Perez 42-yard field goal (Drive: 4 plays, 5 yards, 0:44; East Carolina 27–13)
- (10:38) UTSA – Brandon High 66-yard run, Chase Allen kick (Drive: 4 plays, 75 yards, 1:13; East Carolina 27–20)
- (0:13) ECU – Noah Perez 24-yard field goal (Drive: 4 plays, -2 yards, 1:35; East Carolina 30–20)

Statistics	UTSA	ECU
First downs	18	18
Plays–yards	89–456	71–341
Rushes–yards	38–170	36–47
Passing yards	286	294
Passing: Comp–Att–Int	25–51–2	17–35–2
Time of possession	32:20	27:40

Team	Category	Player	Statistics
UTSA	Passing	Owen McCown	24/49, 251 yards, TD, 2 INT
UTSA	Rushing	Brandon High	7 carries, 92 yards, TD
UTSA	Receiving	Willie McCoy	4 receptions, 91 yards
East Carolina	Passing	Jake Garcia	17/35, 294 yards, 2 TD, 2 INT
East Carolina	Rushing	Rahjai Harris	25 carries, 60 yards
East Carolina	Receiving	Chase Sowell	4 receptions, 67 yards

=== at Charlotte ===
East Carolina Pirates (3–2) at Charlotte 49ers (2–3) – Game summary

Quarter	1	2	3	4	Total
Pirates	3	7	7	7	24
49ers	14	17	3	21	55

at Jerry Richardson Stadium • Charlotte, North Carolina

- Date: October 5th
- Game time: 3:30 p.m. EDT
- Game weather: Sunny • Temperature: 84 °F (29 °C) • Wind: S at 8 miles per hour (13 km/h)
- Game attendance: 17,102
- Referee: Steven Anderson
- TV announcers (ESPNU): Matt Schumacker (play-by-play) and Dustin Fox (analyst)

Game information

First quarter

- (10:18) - CLT - Cartevious Norton 11-yard run, Stephen Rusnak kick (Drive: 8 plays, 55 yards, 4:34; CLT 7-0)
- (3:38) - CLT - Deshawn Purdie 1-yard run, Stephen Rusnak kick (Drive: 10 plays, 74 yards, 5:47; CLT 14-0)
- (00:45) - ECU - Noah Perez 38-yard field goal (Drive: 8 plays, 55 yards, 2:53; CLT 14-3)

Second quarter

- (12:24) - ECU - Tyler Savage 13-yard pass from Jake Garcia, Noah Perez kick (Drive: 3 plays, 74 yards, TOP 1:02; CLT 14-10)
- (8:40) - CLT - Stephen Rusnak 35-yard field goal (Drive: 8 plays, 35 yards, TOP 3:37; CLT 17-10)
- (3:24) - CLT - Hahsaun Wilson 1-yard run, Stephen Rusnak kick (Drive: 8 plays, 68 yards, 4:24; CLT 24-10)
- (1:40) - CLT - Cartevious Norton 62-yard run, Stephen Rusnak kick (Drive: 2 plays, 62 yards, 0:14; CLT 31-10)

Third quarter

- (12:26) - ECU - London Montgomery 48-yard run, Noah Perez kick (Drive: 7 plays, 78 yards, 2:29; CLT 31-17)
- (4:00) - CLT - Stephen Rusnak 28-yard field goal (Drive: 11 plays, 60 yards, 05:30; CLT 34-14)

Fourth quarter

- (14:53) - CLT - Hahsaun Wilson 23-yard run, Stephen Rusnak kick (Drive: 5 plays, 76 yards, 2:26; CLT 41-17)
- (12:00) - CLT - Hahsaun Wilson 65-yard run, Stephen Rusnak kick (Drive: 3 plays, 79 yards, 1:31; CLT 48-17)
- (10:31) - CLT - Stone Handy 53-yard interception, Stephen Rusnak kick (Drive: 1 play, 53 yards, 1:29; CLT 55-17)
- (10:17) - ECU - Winston Wright Jr. 94-yard kickoff return, Noah Perez kick (Drive: 1 play, 94 yards, 0:00; CLT 55-24)

Statistics	ECU	CLT
First downs	18	26
Plays–yards	62–343	74–517
Rushes–yards	25–148	52–311
Passing yards	195	206
Passing: Comp–Att–Int	17–37–2	13–22–0
Time of possession	19:06	40:54

Team	Category	Player	Statistics
East Carolina	Passing	Jake Garcia	6/8, 111 yards, TD, INT
East Carolina	Rushing	London Montgomery	3 carries, 56 yards, TD
East Carolina	Receiving	Chase Sowell	4 receptions, 82 yards
Charlotte	Passing	Deshawn Purdie	13/22, 206 yards
Charlotte	Rushing	Hahsaun Wilson	15 carries, 164 yards, 3 TD
Charlotte	Receiving	Jairus Mack	3 receptions, 81 yards

=== at No. 23 Army ===
East Carolina Pirates (3–3) at No. 23 Army Black Knights (6–0) – Game summary

Quarter	1	2	3	4	Total
Pirates	0	0	7	21	28
No. 23 Black Knights	0	17	14	7	38

at Michie Stadium • West Point, New York

- Date: October 19th
- Game time: 12:00 p.m. EDT
- Game weather: Sunny • Temperature: 61 °F (16 °C) • Wind: NW at 4 miles per hour (6.4 km/h)
- Game attendance: 29,044
- Referee: Henry Johns
- TV announcers (ESPN2): Roy Philpott (play-by-play), Sam Acho (analyst), and Taylor Davis (sideline reporter)

Game information

First quarter

- (10:32) ARMY – Miles Stewart 13-yard pass from Bryson Daily, Trey Gronotte kick (Drive: 5 plays, 66 yards, 3:27; Army 7–0)

Second quarter

- (14:56) ARMY – Trey Gronotte 32-yard field goal (Drive: 14 plays, 64 yards, 8:38; Army 10–0)
- (9:10) ARMY – Bryson Daily 17-yard run, Trey Gronotte kick (Drive: 8 plays, 48 yards, 4:24; Army 17–0)
- (7:19) ARMY – Bryson Daily 21-yard run, Trey Gronotte kick (Drive: 1 play, 31 yards, 0:08; Army 24–0)

Third quarter

- (9:12) ARMY – Bryson Daily 1-yard run, Trey Gronotte kick (Drive: 11 plays, 75 yards, 5:48; Army 31–0)
- (7:20) ECU – Chase Sowell 53-yard pass from Katin Houser, Noah Perez kick (Drive: 5 plays, 77 yards, 1:46; Army 31–7)
- (3:10) ARMY – Bryson Daily 3-yard run, Trey Gronotte kick (Drive: 7 plays, 75 yards, 4:10; Army 38–7)

Fourth quarter

- (9:47) ECU – Katin Houser 1-yard run, Noah Perez kick (Drive: 10 plays, 75 yards, 4:51; Army 38–14)
- (6:30) ECU – Anthony Smith 11-yard pass from Katin Houser (Drive: 6 plays, 35 yards, 1:05; Army 38–20)
- (4:43) ARMY – Bryson Daily 4-yard run, Trey Gronotte kick (Drive: 3 plays, 44 yards, 1:42; Army 45–20)
- (2:39) ECU – Winston Wright Jr. 12-yard pass from Katin Houser, Chase Sowell pass (Drive: 7 plays, 75 yards, 2:04; Army 45–28)

Statistics	ECU	ARMY
First downs	20	22
Plays–yards	58–369	66–442
Rushes–yards	20–87	56–295
Passing yards	282	147
Passing: Comp–Att–Int	24–38–1	7–10–0
Time of possession	22:40	37:20

Team	Category	Player	Statistics
East Carolina	Passing	Katin Houser	24/38, 282 yards, 3 TD, INT
East Carolina	Rushing	Rahjai Harris	9 carries, 34 yards
East Carolina	Receiving	Chase Sowell	7 receptions, 138 yards, TD
Army	Passing	Bryson Daily	7/10, 147 yards, TD
Army	Rushing	Bryson Daily	31 carries, 171 yards, 5 TD
Army	Receiving	Casey Reynolds	3 receptions, 85 yards

=== Temple ===
Temple Owls (2–5) at East Carolina Pirates (3–4) – Game summary

Quarter	1	2	3	4	Total
Owls	14	7	7	6	34
Pirates	13	14	29	0	56

at Dowdy–Ficklen Stadium • Greenville, North Carolina

- Date: October 26th
- Game time: 2:00 p.m. EDT
- Game weather: Sunny • Temperature: 77 °F (25 °C) • Wind: N 5 miles per hour (8.0 km/h)
- Game attendance: 33,744
- Referee: Darryl DeBerry
- TV announcers (ESPN+): Mike Corey (play-by-play), Reggie Walker (analyst) and Smacker Miles (sideline)

Game information

First quarter

- (13:33) ECU – Anthony Smith 42-yard pass from Katin Houser, Noah Perez kick (Drive: 4 plays, 52 yards, 1:00; East Carolina 7–0)
- (8:04) TEM – Evan Simon 1-yard run, Maddux Trujillo kick (Drive: 10 plays, 75 yards, 5:29; Tied 7–7)
- (4:18) ECU – Jhari Patterson 17-yard pass from Katin Houser (Drive: 10 plays, 61 yards, 3:40; East Carolina 13–7)
- (3:22) TEM – Ashton Allen 60-yard pass from Evan Simon, Maddux Trujillo kick (Drive: 3 plays, 73 yards, 0:51; Temple 14–13)

Second quarter

- (9:39) TEM – Ashton Allen 27-yard pass from Evan Simon, Maddux Trujillo kick (Drive: 3 plays, 38 yards, 0:57; Temple 21–13)
- (6:29) ECU – Winston Wright Jr., 9-yard pass from Katin Houser, Andrew Conrad kick (Drive: 8 plays, 75 yards, 3:10; Temple 21–20)
- (0:08) ECU – Chase Sowell 45-yard pass from Katin Houser, Andrew Conrad kick (Drive: 3 plays, 60 yards, 0:19; East Carolina 27–21)

Third quarter

- (13:30) ECU – Rahjai Harris 4-yard run, Tyler Savage pass (Drive: 4 plays, 62 yards, 1:23; East Carolina 35–21)
- (6:25) TEM – Landon Morris 25-yard pass from Evan Simon, Maddux Trujillo kick (Drive: 13 plays, 79 yards, 6:59; East Carolina 35–28)
- (5:01) ECU – Marlon Gunn Jr., 7-yard run, Andrew Conrad kick (Drive: 4 plays, 75 yards, 1:24; East Carolina 42–28)
- (4:44) ECU – Ja'Marley Riddle 55-yard interception, Andrew Conrad kick (East Carolina 49–28)
- (3:39) ECU – Yannick Smith 16-yard pass from Katin Houser, Andrew Conrad kick (Drive: 2 plays, 20 yards, 0:34; East Carolina 56–28)

Fourth quarter

- (14:10) TEM – Terrez Worthy 7-yard run (Drive: 11 plays, 75 yards, 4:29; East Carolina 56–34)

Statistics	TEM	ECU
First downs	23	19
Plays–yards	79–405	65–500
Rushes–yards	38–111	36–231
Passing yards	294	269
Passing: Comp–Att–Int	23–41–3	16–29–2
Time of possession	33:27	26:33

Team	Category	Player	Statistics
Temple	Passing	Evan Simon	23/41, 294 yards, 3 TD, 3 INT
Temple	Rushing	Terrez Worthy	20 carries, 88 yards, TD
Temple	Receiving	Ashton Allen	4 receptions, 109 yards, 2 TD
East Carolina	Passing	Katin Houser	16/29, 269 yards, 5 TD, 2 INT
East Carolina	Rushing	Rahjai Harris	11 carries, 130 yards, TD
East Carolina	Receiving	Chase Sowell	4 receptions, 117 yards, TD

=== Florida Atlantic ===
Florida Atlantic Owls (2–6) at East Carolina Pirates (4–4) – Game summary

Quarter	1	2	3	4	Total
Owls	0	7	0	7	14
Pirates	21	14	7	7	49

at Dowdy–Ficklen Stadium • Greenville, North Carolina

- Date: November 7th
- Game time: 8:00 p.m. EST
- Game weather: Clear • Temperature: 68 °F (20 °C) • Wind: SW 2 miles per hour (3.2 km/h)
- Game attendance: 30,573
- Referee: Tim Rich
- TV announcers (ESPN2): Taylor Zarzour (play-by-play), Matt Stinchcomb (analyst) and Alyssa Lang (sideline)

Game information

First quarter

- (14:36) ECU – Chase Sowell 50-yard pass from Katin Houser, Andrew Conrad kick (Drive: 2 plays, 75 yards, 0:24; East Carolina 7–0)
- (10:33) ECU – Winston Wright Jr. 47-yard pass from Katin Houser, Andrew Conrad kick (Drive: 4 plays, 78 yards, 1:56; East Carolina 14–0)
- (2:56) ECU – Winston Wright Jr. 8-yard pass from Katin Houser, Andrew Conrad kick (Drive: 9 plays, 80 yards, 2:57; East Carolina 21–0)

Second quarter

- (6:07) FAU – Jabari Smith Jr. 2-yard pass from Kasen Weisman, Morgan Suarez kick (Drive: 12 plays, 66 yards, 6:23; East Carolina 21–7)
- (1:18) ECU – Rahjai Harris 1-yard run, Andrew Conrad kick (Drive: 3 plays, 73 yards, 0:37; East Carolina 28–7)
- (0:17) ECU – Katin Houser 35-yard run, Andrew Conrad kick (Drive: 5 plays, 59 yards, 0:30; East Carolina 35–7)

Third quarter

- (7:05) ECU – Anthony Smith 46-yard pass from Katin Houser, Andrew Conrad kick (Drive: 6 plays, 80 yards, 2:32; East Carolina 42–7)

Fourth quarter

- (7:25) ECU – Jayvontay Conner 2-yard pass from Katin Houser, Andrew Conrad kick (Drive: 16 plays, 80 yards, 8:13; East Carolina 49–7)
- (1:07) FAU – CJ Campbell Jr. 2-yard pass from Kasen Weisman, Morgan Suarez kick (Drive: 15 plays, 81 yards, 6:14; East Carolina 49–14)

Statistics	FAU	ECU
First downs	20	23
Plays–yards	75–399	56–581
Rushes–yards	32–137	34–238
Passing yards	262	343
Passing: Comp–Att–Int	25–43–2	17–22–0
Time of possession	36:48	23:12

Team	Category	Player	Statistics
Florida Atlantic	Passing	Kasen Weisman	20/35, 188 yards, 2 TD, INT
Florida Atlantic	Rushing	Kasen Weisman	6 carries, 41 yards
Florida Atlantic	Receiving	Jabari Smith Jr.	5 receptions, 64 yards, TD
East Carolina	Passing	Katin Houser	17/22, 343 yards, 5 TD
East Carolina	Rushing	Jhari Patterson	3 carries, 61 yards
East Carolina	Receiving	Anthony Smith	3 receptions, 120 yards, TD

=== at Tulsa ===
East Carolina Pirates (5–4) at Tulsa Golden Hurricane (3–6) – Game summary

Quarter	1	2	3	4	Total
Pirates	7	10	7	14	38
Golden Hurricane	3	14	7	7	31

at H. A. Chapman Stadium • Tulsa, Oklahoma

- Date: November 14th
- Game time: 7:30 p.m. EST
- Game weather: Sunny
- Game attendance: 17,979
- Referee: Reid Jackson
- TV announcers (ESPN): Matt Barrie (play-by-play), Dan Mullen (analyst) and Harry Lyles Jr. (sideline)

Game information

First quarter

- (11:21) TLSA – Seth Morgan 47-yard field goal (Drive: 9 plays, 42 yards, 3:32; Tulsa 3–0)
- (5:37) ECU – Winston Wright Jr. 4-yard pass from Katin Houser, Andrew Conrad kick (Drive: 4 plays, 80 yards, 1:22; East Carolina 7–3)

Second quarter

- (7:00) ECU – Marion Gunn Jr. 1-yard run, Andrew Conrad kick (Drive: 7 plays, 68 yards, 2:25; East Carolina 14–3)
- (1:51) TLSA – Joseph Williams 39-yard pass from Cooper Legas, Seth Morgan kick (Drive: 11 plays, 76 yards, 5:02; East Carolina 14–10)
- (1:32) TLSA – Keuan Parker 30-yard interception, Seth Morgan kick (Tulsa 17–14)
- (0:00) ECU – Andrew Conrad 52-yard field goal (Drive: 7 plays, 38 yards, 0:38; Tied 17–17)

Third quarter

- (8:48) ECU – London Montgomery 16-yard run, Andrew Conrad kick (Drive: 4 plays, 52 yards, 1:13; East Carolina 24–17)
- (1:15) TLSA – Joseph Williams 14-yard pass from Cooper Legas, Seth Morgan kick (Drive: 5 plays, 58 yards, 2:01; Tied 24–24)

Fourth quarter

- (12:14) TLSA – Joseph Williams 50-yard pass from Cooper Legas, Seth Morgan kick (Drive: 6 plays, 64 yards, 2:00; Tulsa 31–24)
- (5:30) ECU – Rahjai Harris 23-yard run (Drive: 10 plays, 65 yards, 4:09; Tulsa 31–30)
- (2:07) ECU – Rahjai Harris 24-yard run, Rahjai Harris rush (Drive: 6 plays, 72 yards, 2:28; East Carolina 38–31)

Statistics	ECU	TLSA
First downs	27	19
Plays–yards	79–536	69–399
Rushes–yards	42–222	36–106
Passing yards	314	293
Passing: Comp–Att–Int	24–37–3	20–33–1
Time of possession	28:53	31:07

Team	Category	Player	Statistics
East Carolina	Passing	Katin Houser	24/37, 314 yards, TD, 3 INT
East Carolina	Rushing	Rahjai Harris	18 carries, 114 yards, 2 TD
East Carolina	Receiving	Anthony Smith	3 receptions, 84 yards
Tulsa	Passing	Cooper Legas	20/32, 293 yards, 3 TD, INT
Tulsa	Rushing	Cooper Legas	13 carries, 43 yards
Tulsa	Receiving	Joseph Williams	5 receptions, 158 yards, 3 TD

=== at North Texas ===
East Carolina Pirates (6–4) at North Texas Mean Green (5–5) – Game summary

Quarter	1	2	3	4	Total
Pirates	0	7	24	9	40
Mean Green	14	7	7	0	28

at DATCU Stadium • Denton, Texas

- Date: November 23rd
- Game time: 3:30 p.m. EST
- Game weather: Sunny • Temperature: 72 °F (22 °C) • Wind: S 11 miles per hour (18 km/h)
- Game attendance: 17,387
- Referee: Charles Lamertina
- TV announcers (ESPN+): Ted Emrich (play-by-play), LaDarrin McLane (analyst) and Smacker Miles (sideline)

Game information

First quarter

- (8:31) UNT – Blair Conwright 4-yard pass from Chandler Morris, Kali Nguma kick (Drive: 4 plays, 37 yards, 1:45; North Texas 7–0)
- (5:54) UNT – Miles Coleman 7-yard pass from Chandler Morris, Kali Nguma kick (Drive: 9 plays, 49 yards, 2:14; North Texas 14–0)

Second quarter

- (3:06) UNT – Blair Conwright 3-yard pass from Chandler Morris, Kali Nguma kick (Drive: 14 plays, 83 yards, 6:59; North Texas 21–0)
- (0:04) ECU – Rahjai Harris 1-yard run, Andrew Conrad kick (Drive: 14 plays, 67 yards, 3:01; North Texas 21–7)

Third quarter

- (13:06) ECU – Rahjai Harris 39-yard run, Andrew Conrad kick (Drive: 2 plays, 46 yards, 0:31; North Texas 21–14)
- (8:19) ECU – Andrew Conrad 38-yard field goal (Drive: 9 plays, 25 yards, 3:11; North Texas 21–17)
- (6:08) ECU – Anthony Smith 50-yard pass from Katin Houser, Andrew Conrad kick (Drive: 4 plays, 80 yards, 1:16; East Carolina 24–21)
- (1:43) ECU – Yannick Smith 28-yard pass from Katin Houser, Andrew Conrad kick (Drive: 8 plays, 65 yards, 2:41; East Carolina 31–21)
- (0:04) UNT – Makenzie McGill II 7-yard run, Kali Nguma kick (Drive: 4 plays, 75 yards, 1:39; East Carolina 31–28)

Fourth quarter

- (10:36) ECU – Andrew Conrad 31-yard field goal (Drive: 12 plays, 63 yards, 4:28; East Carolina 34–28)
- (1:38) ECU – Rahjai Harris 7-yard run (Drive: 3 plays, 30 yards, 0:23; East Carolina 40–28)

Statistics	ECU	UNT
First downs	26	30
Plays–yards	81–553	84–447
Rushes–yards	57–255	36–181
Passing yards	298	266
Passing: Comp–Att–Int	16–24–1	32–48–0
Time of possession	28:33	31:27

Team	Category	Player	Statistics
East Carolina	Passing	Katin Houser	16/23, 298 yards, 2 TD, INT
East Carolina	Rushing	Rahjai Harris	24 carries, 128 yards, 3 TD
East Carolina	Receiving	Anthony Smith	4 receptions, 121 yards, TD
North Texas	Passing	Chandler Morris	32/48, 266 yards, 3 TD
North Texas	Rushing	Shane Porter	17 carries, 74 yards
North Texas	Receiving	Damon Ward Jr.	5 receptions, 68 yards

=== Navy ===
Navy Midshipmen (7–3) at East Carolina Pirates (7–4) – Game summary

Quarter	1	2	3	4	Total
Midshipmen	0	0	14	20	34
Pirates	0	3	0	17	20

at Dowdy–Ficklen Stadium • Greenville, North Carolina

- Date: November 29th
- Game time: 12:00 p.m. EST
- Game weather: Temperature: 48 °F (9 °C) • Wind: NW at 5 miles per hour (8.0 km/h) • Weather: Sunny
- Game attendance: 35,663
- Referee: Edwin Lee
- TV announcers (ESPN): Anish Shroff (play-by-play), Andre Ware (analyst) and Paul Carcaterra (sideline)

Game information

First quarter

- No scoring plays this quarter.

Second quarter

- (9:47) ECU – Andrew Conrad 35-yard field goal (Drive: 4 plays, -1 yards, 1:06; East Carolina 3–0)

Third quarter

- (6:58) NAVY – Brandon Chatman 16-yard run, Nathan Kirkwood kick (Drive: 14 plays, 76 yards, 7:57; Navy 7–3)
- (0:11) NAVY – Eli Heidenreich 36-yard run, Nathan Kirkwood kick (Drive: 5 plays, 57 yards, 2:08; Navy 14–3)

Fourth quarter

- (11:49) ECU – Andrew Conrad 48-yard field goal (Drive: 10 plays, 43 yards, 3:08; Navy 14–6)
- (10:48) NAVY – Nathan Kent 61-yard pass from Braxton Woodson, Nathan Kirkwood kick (Drive: 3 plays, 75 yards, 1:11; Navy 21–6)
- (5:35) ECU – Winston Wright Jr. 9-yard pass from Katin Houser, Andrew Conrad kick (Drive: 16 plays, 78 yards, 5:08; Navy 21–13)
- (2:49) NAVY – Braxton Woodson 38-yard run, Nathan Kirkwood PAT blocked (Drive: 5 plays, 75 yards, 2:46; Navy 27–13)
- (2:06) NAVY – Braxton Woodson 10-yard run, Nathan Kirkwood kick (Drive: 2 plays, 15 yards, 0:09; Navy 33–13)
- (0:11) ECU – Yannick Smith 52-yard pass from Katin Houser, Andrew Conrad kick (Drive: 4 plays, 85 yards, 0:28; Navy 40–20)

Statistics	NAVY	ECU
First downs	21	19
Plays–yards	72–458	70–350
Rushes–yards	53–293	34–131
Passing yards	165	219
Passing: Comp–Att–Int	19–19–0	20–36–1
Time of possession	34:30	25:30

Team	Category	Player	Statistics
Navy	Passing	Braxton Woodson	12/19, 165 yards, TD
Navy	Rushing	Braxton Woodson	15 carries, 125 yards, 2 TD
Navy	Receiving	Nathan Kent	2 receptions, 68 yards, TD
East Carolina	Passing	Katin Houser	20/36, 219 yards, TD, INT
East Carolina	Rushing	Rahjai Harris	19 carries, 88 yards
East Carolina	Receiving	Yannick Smith	3 receptions, 66 yards, TD

=== NC State (Military Bowl / rivalry) ===
2024 Military Bowl
East Carolina Pirates (7–5) vs. NC State Wolfpack (6–6) – Game summary

Quarter	1	2	3	4	Total
Pirates	7	6	7	6	26
Wolfpack	0	7	0	14	21

at Navy–Marine Corps Memorial Stadium • Annapolis, MD

- Date: December 28, 2024
- Game time: 5:45 p.m.
- Game weather: Cloudy, 47 °F (8 °C)
- Game attendance: 23,981
- Referee: Jon Noli
- TV announcers (ESPN): Jay Alter (play-by-play), Rocky Boiman (analyst), and Alex Chappell (sideline)

Game information

First quarter

- (4:43) ECU – Katin Houser 19-yard run, Noah Perez kick (Drive: 10 plays, 75 yards, 3:55; East Carolina 7–0)

Second quarter

- (6:17) ECU – Noah Perez 24-yard field goal (Drive: 14 plays, 74 yards, 6:17; East Carolina 10–0)
- (1:58) NCSU – Dacari Collins 8-yard pass from CJ Bailey, Kanoah Vinesett kick (Drive: 11 plays, 78 yards, 5:19; East Carolina 10–7)
- (0:06) ECU – Noah Perez 42-yard field goal (Drive: 11 plays, 51 yards, 1:52; East Carolina 13–7)

Third quarter

- (9:17) ECU – Katin Houser 4-yard run, Noah Perez kick (Drive: 12 plays, 75 yards, 5:43; East Carolina 20–7)

Fourth quarter

- (13:04) NCSU – Justin Joly 15-yard pass from CJ Bailey, Kanoah Vinesett kick (Drive: 9 plays, 72 yards, 3:19; East Carolina 20–14)
- (9:49) NCSU – Hollywood Smothers 33-yard pass from CJ Bailey, Kanoah Vinesett kick (Drive: 3 plays, 60 yards, 1:33; NC State 21–20)
- (1:33) ECU – Rahjai Harris 86-yard run, 2-point pass failed (Drive: 3 plays, 86 yards, 0:26; East Carolina 26–21)

Statistics	ECU	NCST
First downs	22	21
Total yards	473	428
Rushing yards	326	198
Passing yards	147	230
Passing: Comp–Att–Int	18–29–2	19–26–1
Time of possession	26:37	33:23

Team	Category	Player	Statistics
East Carolina	Passing	Katin Houser	18/29, 147 yards, 2 INT
East Carolina	Rushing	Rahjai Harris	17 carries, 221 yards, 1 TD
East Carolina	Receiving	Yannick Smith	3 receptions, 56 yards
NC State	Passing	CJ Bailey	19/26, 230 yards, 3 TD, 1 INT
NC State	Rushing	Hollywood Smothers	15 carries, 142 yards
NC State	Receiving	Noah Rogers	5 receptions, 59 yards

== Roster ==
2024 East Carolina Pirates football team roster
Players
Coaches
Offense

Pos.	#	Name	Class
WR	0	Jhari Patterson	Sr
WR	1	Winston Wright Jr.	GS
QB	2	Raheim Jeter	Fr
WR	3	Kelan Robinson	Jr
QB	4	Katin Houser	So
WR	5	Chase Sowell	So
QB	6	John David Black	Fr
TE	6	Desirrio Riles	So
WR	7	Kerry King	Jr
TE	8	Jayvontay "JC" Conner	Fr
TE	9	Tyler Savage	Sr
TE	10	Casey Kelly	GS
QB	11	Jake Garcia	Jr
QB	12	Bryson Harrison	Fr
WR	14	Dillon Lorick	Fr
WR	15	Yannick Smith	Fr
WR	17	Anthony Smith	Sr
RB	21	Marlon Gunn Jr.	Jr
RB	22	Michael Beatty	Fr
RB	23	Jah'Cire Jones	Fr
WR	25	McCallum Wright	So
RB	26	DaMari Gantt	Fr
WR	27	Jason Dickerson	Fr
RB	30	Javious Bond	So
RB	32	TJ Engleman Jr.	Fr
WR	33	Brock Spalding	So
RB	34	London Montgomery	Fr
TE	45	Mason Brown	So
RB	47	Rahjai Harris	GS
OL	52	Parker Moorer	GS
OL	53	Panda Askew	Sr
OL	55	Darius Bell	Jr
OL	60	Emmanuel Poku	So
OL	61	Jayson Tarpeh	Jr
OL	62	Jimarion McCrimon	So
OL	63	Jake Crocker	So
OL	65	Dustyn Hall	GS
OL	66	Marleo Neolien	So
OL	67	Amarie Archer	Jr
OL	68	Trey Hardison	Jr
OL	70	Kameron Durant	So
OL	71	Bryce Weaver	So
OL	72	Zack Boehly	Fr
OL	73	Karson Jones	So
OL	74	Hampton Ergle	Sr
OL	75	Kenny Walz	Fr
OL	76	Jacob Sacra	Jr
OL	77	Samuel "Sam" Riddy Jr.	Fr
OL	78	William Coats	So
OL	79	Cohen Ezzell	Fr
WR	80	Ty Johnson	Fr
WR	81	Jyron Waiters	Fr
TE	82	Gage Reale	So
WR	83	Bleu Coleman	So
WR	84	Melvin Jacobs	Jr
WR	86	Ryan Stephens	So
TE	87	Nick Slogik	Fr
WR	88	Trenton Cloud	Fr
WR	89	Malik Leverett	So

Defense

Pos.	#	Name	Class
DB	2	Devon King	Sr
DL	3	Chad Stephens	GS
DB	4	Javion Clark	So
DB	5	Gavin Gibson	Jr
DB	6	Dontavius Nash	Jr
OLB	7	Samuel Dankah	Jr
DL	9	J. D. Lampley	Jr
LB	10	Mike Edwards III	Sr
DB	11	Andrew Wilson-Lamp	Jr
DB	12	Omar Rogers	GS
DB	13	Eric Fletcher	Fr
DB	14	Daylyn Diston	So
OLB	17	Shaikh Thompson	Fr
DB	19	DeMarius Hines	Fr
DB	20	Kamaurri McKinley	So
DB	21	Jordan Huff	Sr
DB	22	Ja'Marley Riddle	Fr
LB	23	Dameon Wilson	Jr
DB	24	TyMir Brown	Jr
DB	25	Kingston McKinstry	GS
DB	26	Isaiah Brown-Murray	So
DB	27	O'Marion Lewis	Fr
DB	28	Shavon Revel	Sr
DB	30	Timothy Patterson	So
LB	31	Kevon Merrell	Fr
OLB	32	Ryheem Craig	Jr
LB	33	Zakye Barker	So
OLB	34	Jackson Barker	So
DB	35	Ayden Duncanson	Fr
DB	37	Adam Cole	So
DB	37	Keyshawn Jackson	Fr
LB	38	Noah Holmes	Sr
OLB	39	Luke Holmes	Fr
LB	40	Greg Turner III	Fr
LB	41	DJ Johnson Jr.	Fr
LB	42	Julien Davis	So
DB	43	Derick Brazil	Fr
DL	44	Preston Carr	So
DB	45	Jurnee Lattimore	Fr
DB	46	Alex Moye	Fr
DB	47	No'Tavien Green	So
DB	49	Josh Benton	So
DL	50	Kieran Davis	So
LB	51	Shane Perry	Sr
DL	53	Suirad Ware	Sr
LB	54	Jayden Olden	Fr
DL	54	Zion Wilson	Jr
DL	55	Jasiyah Robinson	Jr
DL	56	D'Anta Johnson	Sr
DL	57	Ajani "AJ" Farmer	So
LB	58	Tate Smith	Fr
DL	59	Demoris Jenkins	So
DL	90	Elijah Morris	Sr
DL	91	Miles Parker	Fr
DL	92	C. J. Mims	So
DL	93	Jaden McKenzie	GS
DL	94	Javon Williams	Fr
DL	97	Jacoby Martin	Fr
DL	98	Torin Brazell	Fr
DL	99	Logan Wright	So

Special teams

Pos.	#	Name	Class
P	1	Luke Larson	GS
LS	41	Tripp Smith	So
K	43	Noah Perez	Jr
P	48	Tomas O'Halloran	Fr
LS	49	Alex Harper	GS
K	93	Everett Scott	Fr
P	94	Ethan Stumpf	Fr
K	95	Andrew Conrad	Jr
K	96	Britt Glover	Fr
LS	97	Cole Walker	Fr

Head coach

- Mike Houston (first 7 games)
- Blake Harrell (interim; remainder of the season)

Coordinators/assistant coaches

- Blake Harrell – Defensive coordinator/Inside linebackers
- John David Baker – Offensive coordinator/Quarterbacks
- Andre Powell – Special teams coordinator
- Jules Montinar – Defensive passing game coordinator/Cornerbacks
- Rodney Freeman II – Running backs
- Hunter MacKay – Tight ends
- Damon Magazu – Safeties
- Matt Mattox – Offensive linemen
- Dyrell Roberts – Wide receivers
- Roy Tesh – Defensive tackles
- Rico Zackery – Defensive ends/Outside linebackers
- Aaron Auer – Senior offensive analyst
- Arketa Banks – Senior defensive analyst
- Jeff Gerzog – Graduate assistant
- Nicholas Hudgens – Graduate assistant
- Jocelee Lafael – Graduate assistant
- Cameron Nichols – Graduate assistant
- Mark Hatcher – Recruiting coordinator
- John Williams Jr. – Director, Strength and Conditioning

Legend

- (C) Team captain
- (S) Suspended
- (I) Ineligible
- Injured
- Redshirt

Roster
Last update: 11/18/24

== Statistics ==
=== Team ===
	East Carolina	Opp
Points per Game		
Total		
First downs		
Rushing		
Passing		
Penalty		
Rushing yards		
Avg per play		
Avg per game		
Rushing touchdowns		
Passing yards		
Att-Comp-Int		
Avg per pass		
Avg per catch		
Avg per game		
Passing touchdowns		
Total Offense		
Avg per Play		
Avg per Game		
Fumbles-Lost		
Penalties-Yards		
Avg per Game		
Punts-Yards		
Avg per Punt		
Time of Possession/Game		
3rd Down Conversions		
4th Down Conversions		
Touchdowns Scored		
Field Goals-Attempts		
PAT-Attempts		
Attendance		
Games/Avg per Game		
Neutral Site		

=== Offense ===
Passing statistics
#	NAME	POS	RAT	CMP	ATT	YDS	AVG/G	CMP%	TD	INT	LONG
		QB	–	–	–	–	–	–	–	–	–
		QB	–	–	–	–	–	–	–	–	–
		QB	–	–	–	–	–	–	–	–	–
		QB	–	–	–	–	–	–	–	–	–
	TOTALS		–	–	–	–	–	–	–	–	–

Rushing statistics
#	NAME	POS	ATT	GAIN	AVG	TD	LONG	AVG/G
		RB	–	–	–	–	–	–
		RB	–	–	–	–	–	–
		RB	–	–	–	–	–	–
		RB	–	–	–	–	–	–
		RB	–	–	–	–	–	–
		RB	–	–	–	–	–	–
	TOTALS		–	–	–	–	–	–

Receiving statistics
#	NAME	POS	CTH	YDS	AVG	TD	LONG	AVG/G
		WR	–	–	–	–	–	–
		WR	–	–	–	–	–	–
		WR	–	–	–	–	–	–
		WR	–	–	–	–	–	–
		WR	–	–	–	–	–	–
		WR	–	–	–	–	–	–
		WR	–	–	–	–	–	–
		WR	–	–	–	–	–	–
		WR	–	–	–	–	–	–
		TE	–	–	–	–	–	–
		TE	–	–	–	–	–	–
		TE	–	–	–	–	–	–
		TE	–	–	–	–	–	–
		TE	–	–	–	–	–	–
	TOTALS		–	–	–	–	–	–

=== Defense ===
Defense statistics
#	NAME	POS	SOLO	AST	TOT	TFL-YDS	SACK-YDS	INT-YDS	BU	QBH	FR	FF	BLK	SAF	TD
		DL	–	–	–	–	–	–	–	–	–	–	–	–	–
		DL	–	–	–	–	–	–	–	–	–	–	–	–	–
		DL	–	–	–	–	–	–	–	–	–	–	–	–	–
		DL	–	–	–	–	–	–	–	–	–	–	–	–	–
		DL	–	–	–	–	–	–	–	–	–	–	–	–	–
		DL	–	–	–	–	–	–	–	–	–	–	–	–	–
		DL	–	–	–	–	–	–	–	–	–	–	–	–	–
		DL	–	–	–	–	–	–	–	–	–	–	–	–	–
		DL	–	–	–	–	–	–	–	–	–	–	–	–	–
		DL	–	–	–	–	–	–	–	–	–	–	–	–	–
		DL	–	–	–	–	–	–	–	–	–	–	–	–	–
		DL	–	–	–	–	–	–	–	–	–	–	–	–	–
		DL	–	–	–	–	–	–	–	–	–	–	–	–	–
		DL	–	–	–	–	–	–	–	–	–	–	–	–	–
		DL	–	–	–	–	–	–	–	–	–	–	–	–	–
		DL	–	–	–	–	–	–	–	–	–	–	–	–	–
		RUSH	–	–	–	–	–	–	–	–	–	–	–	–	–
		RUSH	–	–	–	–	–	–	–	–	–	–	–	–	–
		RUSH	–	–	–	–	–	–	–	–	–	–	–	–	–
		RUSH	–	–	–	–	–	–	–	–	–	–	–	–	–
		RUSH	–	–	–	–	–	–	–	–	–	–	–	–	–
		LB	–	–	–	–	–	–	–	–	–	–	–	–	–
		LB	–	–	–	–	–	–	–	–	–	–	–	–	–
		LB	–	–	–	–	–	–	–	–	–	–	–	–	–
		LB	–	–	–	–	–	–	–	–	–	–	–	–	–
		LB	–	–	–	–	–	–	–	–	–	–	–	–	–
		LB	–	–	–	–	–	–	–	–	–	–	–	–	–
		LB	–	–	–	–	–	–	–	–	–	–	–	–	–
		DB	–	–	–	–	–	–	–	–	–	–	–	–	–
		DB	–	–	–	–	–	–	–	–	–	–	–	–	–
		DB	–	–	–	–	–	–	–	–	–	–	–	–	–
		DB	–	–	–	–	–	–	–	–	–	–	–	–	–
		DB	–	–	–	–	–	–	–	–	–	–	–	–	–
		DB	–	–	–	–	–	–	–	–	–	–	–	–	–
		DB	–	–	–	–	–	–	–	–	–	–	–	–	–
		DB	–	–	–	–	–	–	–	–	–	–	–	–	–
		DB	–	–	–	–	–	–	–	–	–	–	–	–	–
		DB	–	–	–	–	–	–	–	–	–	–	–	–	–
		DB	–	–	–	–	–	–	–	–	–	–	–	–	–
		DB	–	–	–	–	–	–	–	–	–	–	–	–	–
		DB	–	–	–	–	–	–	–	–	–	–	–	–	–
		DB	–	–	–	–	–	–	–	–	–	–	–	–	–
		DB	–	–	–	–	–	–	–	–	–	–	–	–	–
		DB	–	–	–	–	–	–	–	–	–	–	–	–	–
–		DB	–	–	–	–	–	–	–	–	–	–	–	–	–
	Team		–	–	–	–	–	–	–	–	–	–	–	–	–
	TOTAL		–	–	–	–	–	–	–	–	–	–	–	–	–

Key: POS: Position, SOLO: Solo Tackles, AST: Assisted Tackles, TOT: Total Tackles, TFL: Tackles-for-loss, SACK: Quarterback Sacks, INT: Interceptions, BU: Passes Broken Up, PD: Passes Defended, QBH: Quarterback Hits, FR: Fumbles Recovered, FF: Forced Fumbles, BLK: Kicks or Punts Blocked, SAF: Safeties, TD : Touchdown

=== Special teams ===
Kicking statistics
#	NAME	POS	XPM	XPA	XP%	FGM	FGA	FG%	1–19	20–29	30–39	40–49	50+	LNG
		K	–	–	–	–	–	–	0/0	0/0	0/0	0/0	0/0	–
		K	–	–	–	–	–	–	0/0	0/0	0/0	0/0	0/0	–
	TOTALS		–	–	–	–	–	–	0/0	0/0	0/0	0/0	0/0	–

Kickoff statistics
#	NAME	POS	KICKS	YDS	AVG	TB	OB
–	–	–	–	–	–	–	–
	TOTALS		–	–	–	–	–

Punting statistics
#	NAME	POS	PUNTS	YDS	AVG	LONG	TB	I–20	50+	BLK
		P	–	–	–	–	–	–	–	–
		P	–	–	–	–	–	–	–	–
	TOTALS		–	–	–	–	–	–	–	–

Kick return statistics
#	NAME	POS	RTNS	YDS	AVG	TD	LNG
			–	–	–	–	–
	TOTALS		–	–	–	–	–

Punt return statistics
#	NAME	POS	RTNS	YDS	AVG	TD	LONG
			–	–	–	–	–
	TOTALS		–	–	–	–	–

=== Scoring ===
==== East Carolina vs non-conference opponents ====
	1	2	3	4	Total
East Carolina	0	0	0	0	0
Opponents	0	0	0	0	0

==== East Carolina vs AAC opponents ====
	1	2	3	4	Total
East Carolina	0	0	0	0	0
Opponents	0	0	0	0	0

==== East Carolina vs all opponents ====
	1	2	3	4	Total
East Carolina	0	0	0	0	0
Opponents	0	0	0	0	0
