= 2023 East Carolina Pirates football team =

American college football season

2023 East Carolina Pirates football
- Conference: American Athletic Conference
- Record: 2–10 (1–7 AAC)
- Head coach: Mike Houston (5th season)
- Offensive coordinator: Donnie Kirkpatrick (5th season)
- Offensive scheme: Spread
- Defensive coordinator: Blake Harrell (4th season)
- Base defense: 3–4 or 4–2–5
- Home stadium: Dowdy-Ficklen Stadium

2023 American Athletic Conference football standings
	Conf.			Overall
Team	W		L	W		L
No. 22 SMU y$	8	–	0	11	–	3
Tulane y	8	–	0	11	–	3
UTSA	7	–	1	9	–	4
Memphis	6	–	2	10	–	3
South Florida	4	–	4	7	–	6
Rice	4	–	4	6	–	7
Navy	4	–	4	5	–	7
North Texas	3	–	5	5	–	7
UAB	3	–	5	4	–	8
Florida Atlantic	3	–	5	4	–	8
Charlotte	2	–	6	3	–	9
Tulsa	2	–	6	4	–	8
Temple	1	–	7	3	–	9
East Carolina	1	–	7	2	–	10
Championship: SMU 26, Tulane 14
$ – Conference champion; y – Championship game participant; Rankings from AP Poll

The 2023 East Carolina Pirates football team represented East Carolina University during the 2023 NCAA Division I FBS football season. The Pirates played their home games at Dowdy-Ficklen Stadium in Greenville, North Carolina, and competed as members of the American Athletic Conference. They were led by head coach Mike Houston, in his fifth season.

The East Carolina Pirates football team drew an average home attendance of 35,115 in 2023.

== Offseason ==
=== Transfers ===
==== Outgoing ====
Player	Position	New school
Terrance Copper Jr.	WR	Unknown
Rick D'Abreu	DL	TCU
Owen Daffer	K	NCA&T
Maceo Donald	WR	Unknown
Shawn Dourseau	S	Northern Arizona
Malik Fleming	CB	Houston
Justyn Haynesworth	DT	Maine
Damel Hickman	CB	Georgia Southern
Immanuel Hickman	DE	South Florida
Brandon Higgs	CB	Stony Brook
Taji Hudson	WR	James Madison
Avery Jones	OL	Auburn
Robert Kennedy	S	NC State
Max Lantzsch	TE	New Mexico
Grayson Lewis	OL	LIU
Fletcher Marshall	CB	Northern Iowa
Demetrius Mauney	S	Unknown
D'Angelo McKinnie	TE	Stony Brook
Andre Pegues	WR	Norfolk State
Juan Powell	CB	Coastal Carolina
Elijah Robinson	DE	Hawaii
Nemo Squire	RB	Gardner-Webb
Nishad Strother	OL	Oregon
Ryan Stubblefield	QB	Incarnate Word
G'Mone Wilson	CB	Valdosta State
Jireh Wilson	S	UCF

==== Incoming ====
Player	Position	Previous school
Ryan Beckman	OL	Akron
Owen Murphy	OT	Akron
Jonathan Jones	CB	Campbell
Chase Sowell	WR	Colorado
Dustyn Hall	OL	Duke
Omar Rogers	S	Elon
Gerald Green	RB	Georgia Southern
Ryan King	WR	Georgia Tech
Rance Conner	CB	Louisville
Tymir Brown	CB	North Carolina
Dontavius Nash	S	North Carolina
RaRa Dillworth	LB	North Carolina
Tyquan King	LB	North Carolina A&T
B.J. Davis	LB	South Carolina State
Keelan Marion	WR	UConn
Jerry Rice	K	VMI

== Schedule ==
East Carolina and the American Athletic Conference (AAC) announced the 2023 football schedule on February 21, 2023.

Date	Time	Opponent	Site	TV	Result	Attendance
September 2	12:00 p.m.	at No. 2 Michigan*	Michigan Stadium; Ann Arbor, MI	Peacock	L 3–30	109,480
September 9	4:00 p.m.	Marshall*	Dowdy-Ficklen Stadium; Greenville, NC (rivalry)	ESPNU	L 13–31	38,211
September 16	3:30 p.m.	at Appalachian State*	Kidd Brewer Stadium; Boone, NC	ESPN+	L 28–43	40,168
September 23	6:00 p.m.	Gardner–Webb*	Dowdy-Ficklen Stadium; Greenville, NC	ESPN+	W 44–0	40,589
September 30	7:00 p.m.	at Rice	Rice Stadium; Houston, TX	ESPN+	L 17–24	19,598
October 12	7:30 p.m.	SMU	Dowdy-Ficklen Stadium; Greenville, NC	ESPN	L 10–31	33,444
October 21	2:00 p.m.	Charlotte^{†}	Dowdy-Ficklen Stadium; Greenville, NC	ESPN+	L 7–10	39,842
October 28	3:30 p.m.	at UTSA	Alamodome; San Antonio, TX	ESPN+	L 27–41	22,629
November 4	3:30 p.m.	No. 24 Tulane	Dowdy-Ficklen Stadium; Greenville, NC	ESPNU	L 10–13	33,765
November 11	4:00 p.m.	at Florida Atlantic	FAU Stadium; Boca Raton, FL	ESPN+	W 22–7	17,532
November 18	12:00 p.m.	at Navy	Navy–Marine Corps Memorial Stadium; Annapolis, MD	ESPNews/ESPN+	L 0–10	28,708
November 25	2:00 p.m.	Tulsa	Dowdy-Ficklen Stadium; Greenville, NC	ESPN+	L 27–29	29,567
*Non-conference game; ^{†}Homecoming; Rankings from AP Poll and CFP Rankings released prior to game; All times are in Eastern time

== Game summaries ==
=== at No. 2 Michigan ===
East Carolina Pirates (0–0) vs No. 2 Michigan Wolverines (0–0) – Game summary

Quarter	1	2	3	4	Total
Pirates	0	0	0	3	3
No. 2 Wolverines	7	16	7	0	30

at Michigan Stadium • Ann Arbor, Michigan

- Date: September 2nd
- Game time: 12:00 p.m. EDT
- Game weather: Sunny • Temperature: 79 °F (26 °C) • Wind: SW at 10 miles per hour (16 km/h)
- Game attendance: 109,480
- Referee: Greg Sujack
- TV announcers (Peacock): Mike Tirico (play-by-play), Chris Simms (analyst), Lewis Johnson (sideline reporter)

Game information

First quarter

- (5:43) MICH – Roman Wilson 13 yard pass from J. J. McCarthy, James Turner kick (Drive: 8 plays, 57 yards, 4:30; Michigan 7–0)

Second quarter

- (14:13) MICH – Blake Corum 2 yard run, James Turner kick (Drive: 7 plays, 90 yards, 3:43; Michigan 14–0)
- (5:32) MICH – Roman Wilson 10 yard pass from J. J. McCarthy, James Turner kick failed (Drive: 7 plays, 76 yards, 4:16; Michigan 20–0)
- (0:00) MICH – James Turner 50 yard field goal (Drive: 6 plays, 34 yards, 0:48; Michigan 23–0)

Third quarter

- (9:13) MICH – Roman Wilson 15 yard pass from J. J. McCarthy, James Turner kick (Drive: 12 plays, 75 yards, 5:47; Michigan 30–0)

Fourth quarter

- (0:00) ECU – Andrew Conrad 33 yard field goal (Drive: 10 plays, 56 yards, 3:04; Michigan 30–3)

Statistics	East Carolina	Michigan
First downs	12	26
Plays–yards	55–235	62–402
Rushes–yards	26–103	31–122
Passing yards	132	280
Passing: comp–att–int	17–29–1	26–31–0
Turnovers		
Time of possession	26:35	33:26

Team	Category	Player	Statistics
East Carolina	Passing	Mason Garcia	11/18, 80 yards, 1 INT
East Carolina	Rushing	Mason Garcia	8 carries, 36 yards
East Carolina	Receiving	Javious Bond	3 receptions, 31 yards
Michigan	Passing	J. J. McCarthy	26/30, 280 yards, 3 TD
Michigan	Rushing	Blake Corum	11 carries, 77 yards
Michigan	Receiving	Roman Wilson	6 receptions, 78 yards, 3 TD

=== vs Marshall (rivalry) ===
Marshall Thundering Herd (1–0) vs East Carolina Pirates (0–1) – Game summary

Quarter	1	2	3	4	Total
Thundering Herd	0	10	0	21	31
Pirates	0	10	3	0	13

at Dowdy-Ficklen Stadium • Greenville, North Carolina

- Date: September 9th
- Game time: 4:00 p.m. EDT
- Game weather: Cloudy • Temperature: 81 °F (27 °C) • Wind: SE at 10 miles per hour (16 km/h)
- Game attendance: 38,211
- Referee: Marshall Lewis
- TV announcers (ESPNU): Jay Alter (play-by-play), Rene Ingoglia (analyst)

Game information

First quarter

- No scoring plays

Second quarter

- (11:32) MRSH – Rasheen Ali 1 yard run, Kameron Lake kick (Drive: 12 plays, 79 yards, 4:37; Marshall 7–0)
- (6:03) MRSH – Kameron Lake 20 yard field goal (Drive: 10 plays, 68 yards, 4:25; Marshall 10–0)
- (3:53) ECU – Andrew Conrad 39 yard field goal (Drive: 5 plays, 53 yards, 2:10; Marshall 10–3)
- (2:22) ECU – Shane Calhoun 2 yard pass from Mason Garcia, Andrew Conrad kick (Drive: 3 plays, 3 yards, 1:16; Tied 10–10)

Third quarter

- (6:04) ECU – Andrew Conrad 30 yard field goal (Drive: 11 plays, 58 yards, 5:43; East Carolina 13–10)

Fourth quarter

- (11:07) MRSH – Caleb McMillan 75 yard pass from Chuck Montgomery, Kameron Lake kick (Drive: 1 play, 75 yards, 0:11; Marshall 17–13)
- (7:16) MRSH – Rasheen Ali 56 yard run, Kameron Lake kick (Drive: 5 plays, 77 yards, 2:17; Marshall 24–13)
- (6:13) MRSH – Rasheen Ali 14 yard run, Kameron Lake kick (Drive: 2 plays, 23 yards, 0:53; Marshall 31–13)

Statistics	Marshall	East Carolina
First downs	22	13
Plays–yards	68–392	69–269
Rushes–yards	38–131	38–146
Passing yards	261	123
Passing: comp–att–int	17–30–0	13–31–2
Turnovers		
Time of possession	30:05	29:55

Team	Category	Player	Statistics
Marshall	Passing	Cam Fancher	15/28, 178 yards
Marshall	Rushing	Rasheen Ali	18 carries, 85 yards, 3 TD
Marshall	Receiving	Caleb McMillan	4 receptions, 85 yards, 1 TD
East Carolina	Passing	Mason Garcia	10/23, 62 yards, 1 TD, 1 INT
East Carolina	Rushing	Mason Garcia	16 carries, 118 yards
East Carolina	Receiving	Jsi Hatfield	4 receptions, 57 yards

=== at Appalachian State ===
East Carolina Pirates (0–2) vs Appalachian State Mountaineers (1–1) – Game summary

Quarter	1	2	3	4	Total
Pirates	7	14	7	0	28
Mountaineers	10	6	20	7	43

at Kidd Brewer Stadium • Boone, North Carolina

- Date: September 16th
- Game time: 3:30 p.m. EST
- Game weather: Sunny • Temperature: 71 °F (22 °C) • Wind: SW at 4 miles per hour (6.4 km/h)
- Game attendance: 40,168
- Referee: Wayne Winkler
- TV announcers (ESPN+): David Jackson (play-by-play), Avery Hall (analyst)

Game information

First quarter

- (10:14) ECU – Rahjai Harris 7 yard run, Andrew Conrad kick (Drive: 9 plays, 75 yards, 4:46; East Carolina 7–0)
- (9:39) APP – Nate Noel 68 yard run, Michael Hughes kick (Drive: 2 plays, 75 yards, 0:35; Tied 7–7)
- (3:49) APP – Michael Hughes 36 yard field goal (Drive: 10 plays, 42 yards, 5:11; Appalachian State 10–7)

Second quarter

- (9:25) ECU – Antoine Jackson 8 yard interception return, Andrew Conrad kick (East Carolina 14–10)
- (2:14) ECU – Rahjai Harris 4 yard run, Andrew Conrad kick (Drive: 11 plays, 57 yards, 4:55; East Carolina 21–10)
- (1:15) APP – Kanye Roberts 18 yard run, 2-point pass failed (Drive: 4 plays, 46 yards, 0:43; East Carolina 21–16)

Third quarter

- (12:05) APP – Kaedin Robinson 34 yard pass from Joey Aguilar, 2-point pass failed (Drive: 8 plays, 75 yards, 2:55; Appalachian State 22–21)
- (10:03) ECU – Shavon Revel 57 yard fumble return, Andrew Conrad kick (East Carolina 28–22)
- (8:18) APP – Milan Tucker 35 yard pass from Joey Aguilar, Michael Hughes kick (Drive: 6 plays, 79 yards, 1:36; Appalachian State 29–28)
- (0:09) APP – Joey Aguilar 1 yard run, Michael Hughes kick (Drive: 6 plays, 19 yards, 2:51; Appalachian State 36–28)

Fourth quarter

- (5:44) APP – David Larkins 6 yard pass from Joey Aguilar, Michael Hughes kick (Drive: 10 plays, 70 yards, 5:44; Appalachian State 43–28)

Statistics	East Carolina	Appalachian State
First downs	14	23
Plays–yards	62–260	75–480
Rushes–yards	27–99	45–239
Passing yards	161	241
Passing: comp–att–int	19–33–3	17–29–1
Turnovers		
Time of possession	28:32	31:28

Team	Category	Player	Statistics
East Carolina	Passing	Alex Flinn	17/31, 158 yards, 3 INT
East Carolina	Rushing	Rahjai Harris	12 carries, 56 yards, 2 TD
East Carolina	Receiving	Jhari Patterson	4 receptions, 44 yards
Appalachian State	Passing	Joey Aguilar	17/29, 241 yards, 3 TD, 1 INT
Appalachian State	Rushing	Nate Noel	25 carries, 193 yards, 1 TD
Appalachian State	Receiving	Kaedin Robinson	4 receptions, 57 yards, 1 TD

=== vs Gardner-Webb (FCS) ===
Gardner-Webb Runnin' Bulldogs (FCS) (1-2) vs East Carolina Pirates (0-3) – Game summary

Quarter	1	2	3	4	Total
Runnin' Bulldogs (FCS)	0	0	0	0	0
Pirates	13	10	7	14	44

at Dowdy-Ficklen Stadium • Greenville, North Carolina

- Date: September 23rd
- Game time: 6:00 p.m. EST
- Game weather: Rain • Temperature: 63 °F (17 °C) • Wind: W at 15 miles per hour (24 km/h)
- Game attendance: 40,589
- Referee: Darryl DeBerry
- TV announcers (ESPN+): James Westling (play-by-play), Reginald Walker Jr. (analyst)

Game information

First quarter

- (9:18) ECU – Rahjai Harris 11 yard pass from Alex Flinn, kick failed (Drive: 6 plays, 72 yards, 2:37; East Carolina 6–0)
- (2:28) ECU – Rahjai Harris 2 yard run, Andrew Conrad kick (Drive: 10 plays, 45 yards, 5:06; East Carolina 13–0)

Second quarter

- (14:46) ECU – Andrew Conrad 44 yard field goal (Drive: 4 plays, -8 yards, 0:58; East Carolina 16–0)
- (13:03) ECU – Mason Garcia 2 yard run, Andrew Conrad kick (Drive: 4 plays, 14 yards, 1:39; East Carolina 23–0)

Third quarter

- (1:55) ECU – Kamarro Edmonds 11 yard run, Andrew Conrad kick (Drive: 8 plays, 66 yards, 3:39; East Carolina 30–0)

Fourth quarter

- (7:39) ECU – Javious Bond 5 yard run, Andrew Conrad kick (Drive: 11 plays, 61 yards, 5:10; East Carolina 37–0)
- (3:05) ECU – Kamarro Edmonds 1 yard run, Andrew Conrad kick (Drive: 2 plays, 9 yards, 0:36; East Carolina 44–0)

Statistics	Gardner-Webb (FCS)	East Carolina
First downs	11	23
Plays–yards	61–107	76–366
Rushes–yards	40–77	43–182
Passing yards	30	184
Passing: comp–att–int	8–21–0	18–32–0
Turnovers		
Time of possession	27:16	32:44

Team	Category	Player	Statistics
Gardner-Webb (FCS)	Passing	Matthew Caldwell	7/17, 30 yards
Gardner-Webb (FCS)	Rushing	Narii Gaither	12 carries, 45 yards
Gardner-Webb (FCS)	Receiving	Narii Gaither; Maleek Huggins; Karim Page	2 receptions, 9 yards
East Carolina	Passing	Alex Flinn	8/18, 94 yards, 1 TD
East Carolina	Rushing	Javious Bond	9 carries, 65 yards, 1 TD
East Carolina	Receiving	Jaylen Johnson	6 receptions, 70 yards

=== at Rice ===
East Carolina Pirates (1-3) vs Rice Owls (2-2) – Game summary

Quarter	1	2	3	4	Total
Pirates	3	6	0	8	17
Owls	3	7	7	7	24

at Rice Stadium • Houston, Texas

- Date: September 30th
- Game time: 7:00 p.m. EST
- Game weather: Sunny • Temperature: 91 °F (33 °C) • Wind: SE at 12 miles per hour (19 km/h)
- Game attendance: 19,598
- Referee: Nate Black
- TV announcers (ESPN+): Richard Cross (play-by-play), Taylor McHargue (analyst), Smacker Miles (sideline reporter)

Game information

First quarter

- (7:17) ECU – Andrew Conrad 35 yard field goal (Drive: 14 plays, 56 yards, 6:16; East Carolina 3–0)
- (2:34) RICE – Tim Horn 41 yard field goal (Drive: 5 plays, 24 yards, 1:50; Tied 3–3)

Second quarter

- (11:32) RICE – Rawson MacNeill 4 yard pass from JT Daniels, Tim Horn kick (Drive: 7 plays, 59 yards, 3:28; Rice 10–3)
- (2:51) ECU – Andrew Conrad 27 yard field goal (Drive: 10 plays, 44 yards, 4:43; Rice 10–6)
- (0:13) ECU – Andrew Conrad 38 yard field goal (Drive: 8 plays, 39 yards, 1:20; Rice 10–9)

Third quarter

- (0:49) RICE – Chase Jenkins 4 yard run, Tim Horn kick (Drive: 7 plays, 53 yards, 4:10; Rice 17–9)

Fourth quarter

- (8:24) ECU – Rahjai Harris 1 yard run, 2-point pass (Drive: 17 plays, 80 yards, 7:19; Tied 17–17)
- (6:24) RICE – Landon Ransom-Goelz 44 yard pass from JT Daniels, Tim Horn kick (Drive: 4 plays, 75 yards, 2:00; Rice 24–17)

Statistics	East Carolina	Rice
First downs	25	14
Plays–yards	83–391	54–277
Rushes–yards	38–145	20–37
Passing yards	246	240
Passing: comp–att–int	21–45–1	19–34–1
Turnovers		
Time of possession	34:58	25:02

Team	Category	Player	Statistics
East Carolina	Passing	Alex Flinn	21/44, 246 yards, 1 INT
East Carolina	Rushing	Javious Bond	7 carries, 72 yards
East Carolina	Receiving	Chase Sowell	7 receptions, 88 yards
Rice	Passing	JT Daniels	18/32, 232 yards, 2 TD, 1 INT
Rice	Rushing	Chase Jenkins	4 carries, 27 yards, 1 TD
Rice	Receiving	Landon Ransom-Goelz	2 receptions, 54 yards, 1 TD

=== vs SMU ===
SMU Mustangs (3-2) vs East Carolina Pirates (1-4) – Game summary

Quarter	1	2	3	4	Total
Mustangs	14	0	0	17	31
Pirates	0	10	0	0	10

at Dowdy-Ficklen Stadium • Greenville, North Carolina

- Date: October 12th
- Game time: 7:30 p.m. EST
- Game weather: Cloudy • Temperature: 62 °F (17 °C) • Wind: SE at 2 miles per hour (3.2 km/h)
- Game attendance: 33,444
- Referee: Luke Richmond
- TV announcers (ESPN): Matt Barrie (play-by-play), Dan Mullen (analyst), Harry Lyles Jr. (sideline reporter)

Game information

First quarter

- (7:09) SMU – Key’Shawn Smith 21 yard pass from Preston Stone, Collin Rogers kick (Drive: 6 plays, 69 yards, 2:16; SMU 7–0)
- (5:04) SMU – Roderick Daniels Jr. 24 yard pass from Preston Stone, Collin Rogers kick (Drive: 3 plays, 74 yards, 1:02; SMU 14–0)

Second quarter

- (13:40) ECU – Andrew Conrad 49 yard field goal (Drive: 14 plays, 44 yards, 6:24; SMU 14–3)
- (2:47) ECU – Mason Garcia 6 yard run, Andrew Conrad kick (Drive: 12 plays, 81 yards, 6:36; SMU 14–10)

Third quarter

- No scoring plays

Fourth quarter

- (13:18) SMU – Collin Rogers 50 yard field goal (Drive: 4 plays, -1 yard, 0:59; SMU 17–10)
- (7:22) SMU – Jonathan McGill 34 yard interception return, Collin Rogers kick (SMU 24–10)
- (2:29) SMU – RJ Maryland 43 yard pass from Preston Stone, Collin Rogers kick (Drive: 7 plays, 70 yards, 3:44; SMU 31–10)

Statistics	SMU	East Carolina
First downs	14	15
Plays–yards	61–334	77–290
Rushes–yards	23–58	38–97
Passing yards	276	193
Passing: comp–att–int	19–38–0	18–39–1
Turnovers		
Time of possession	25:40	34:20

Team	Category	Player	Statistics
SMU	Passing	Preston Stone	19/38, 276 yards, 3 TD
SMU	Rushing	Jaylan Knighton	11 carries, 26 yards
SMU	Receiving	Jordan Kerley	3 receptions, 69 yards
East Carolina	Passing	Mason Garcia	12/26, 155 yards
East Carolina	Rushing	Mason Garcia	12 carries, 38 yards, 1 TD
East Carolina	Receiving	Chase Sowell	7 receptions, 120 yards

=== vs Charlotte (Homecoming) ===
Charlotte 49ers (1-5) vs East Carolina Pirates (1-5) – Game summary

Quarter	1	2	3	4	Total
49ers	3	0	7	0	10
Pirates	0	0	0	7	7

at Dowdy-Ficklen Stadium • Greenville, North Carolina

- Date: October 21st
- Game time: 2:00 p.m. EST
- Game weather: Sunny • Temperature: 66 °F (19 °C) • Wind: W at 14 miles per hour (23 km/h)
- Game attendance: 39,842
- Referee: Edwin Lee
- TV announcers (ESPN+): James Westling (play-by-play), Leger Douzable (analyst)

Game information

First quarter

- (6:38) CLT – Jake Larson 35 yard field goal (Drive: 13 plays, 65 yards, 7:28; Charlotte 3–0)

Second quarter

- No scoring plays

Third quarter

- (10:12) CLT – Jalon Jones 1 yard run, Jake Larson kick (Drive: 8 plays, 75 yards, 4:48; Charlotte 10–0)

Fourth quarter

- (13:14) ECU – Shane Calhoun 10 yard pass from Alex Flinn, Andrew Conrad kick (Drive: 2 plays, 10 yards, 0:08; Charlotte 10–7)

Statistics	Charlotte	East Carolina
First downs	16	9
Plays–yards	67–328	51–127
Rushes–yards	49–184	19–39
Passing yards	144	88
Passing: comp–att–int	11–18–1	15–32–0
Turnovers		
Time of possession	41:15	18:45

Team	Category	Player	Statistics
Charlotte	Passing	Jalon Jones	11/18, 144 yards, 1 INT
Charlotte	Rushing	Jalon Jones	26 carries, 127 yards, 1 TD
Charlotte	Receiving	Colin Weber	1 reception, 40 yards
East Carolina	Passing	Alex Flinn	11/18, 69 yards, 1 TD
East Carolina	Rushing	Kamarro Edmonds	2 carries, 17 yards
East Carolina	Receiving	Chase Sowell	3 receptions, 27 yards

=== at UTSA ===
East Carolina Pirates (1-6) vs UTSA Roadrunners (4-3) – Game summary

Quarter	1	2	3	4	Total
Pirates	17	3	0	7	27
Roadrunners	14	17	3	7	41

at Alamodome • San Antonio, Texas

- Date: October 28th
- Game time: 3:30 p.m. EST
- Game attendance: 22,629
- TV: ESPN+

Game information

First quarter

Second quarter

Third quarter

Fourth quarter

Statistics	East Carolina	UTSA
First downs		
Plays–yards	–	–
Rushes–yards	–	–
Passing yards		
Passing: comp–att–int	––	––
Turnovers		
Time of possession		

Team	Category	Player	Statistics
East Carolina	Passing		
East Carolina	Rushing		
East Carolina	Receiving		
UTSA	Passing		
UTSA	Rushing		
UTSA	Receiving		

=== vs No. 24 Tulane ===
No. 24 Tulane Green Wave (7–1) vs East Carolina Pirates (1–7) – Game summary

Quarter	1	2	3	4	Total
No. 24 Green Wave	0	10	0	3	13
Pirates	10	0	0	0	10

at Dowdy-Ficklen Stadium • Greenville, North Carolina

- Date: November 4th
- Game time: 3:30 p.m. EST
- Game weather: Sunny • Temperature: 71 °F (22 °C) • Wind: S 7 mph
- Game attendance: 33,765
- Referee: Tim Rich
- TV announcers (ESPNU): Jay Alter (play-by-play), Rene Ingoglia (color)

Game information

First Quarter

- (8:37) ECU – Andrew Conrad 27-yard field goal (Drive: 13 plays, 71 yards, 6:17; East Carolina 3–0)
- (1:47) ECU – Gerald Green 1-yard run, Andrew Conrad kick (Drive: 6 plays, 78 yards, 3:41; East Carolina 10–0)

Second Quarter

- (4:08) TUL – Lawrence Keys III 9-yard pass from Michael Pratt, Valentino Ambrosio kick (Drive: 14 plays, 92 yards, 8:37; East Carolina 10–7)
- (0:00) TUL – Valentino Ambrosio 21-yard field goal (Drive: 9 plays, 62 yards, 3:05; Tied 10–10)

Third Quarter

No scoring

Fourth Quarter

- (14:14) TUL – Valentino Ambrosio 26-yard field goal (Drive: 11 plays, 70 yards, 6:48; Tulane 13–10)

Statistics	Tulane	East Carolina
First downs	20	10
Plays–yards	69–368	41–190
Rushes–yards	44–155	23–70
Passing yards	213	120
Passing: comp–att–int	16–25–0	10–18–0
Turnovers		
Time of possession	38:12	21:48

Team	Category	Player	Statistics
Tulane	Passing	Michael Pratt	16/25, 213 yards, TD
Tulane	Rushing	Makhi Hughes	25 carries, 105 yards
Tulane	Receiving	Lawrence Keys III	3 receptions, 77 yards, TD
East Carolina	Passing	Alex Flinn	10/18, 120 yards
East Carolina	Rushing	Rahjai Harris	13 carries, 52 yards
East Carolina	Receiving	Jaylen Johnson	3 receptions, 40 yards

=== at Florida Atlantic ===
East Carolina Pirates (1-8) vs Florida Atlantic Owls (4-5) – Game summary

Quarter	1	2	3	4	Total
Pirates	0	0	0	0	0
Owls	0	0	0	0	0

at FAU Stadium • Boca Raton, Florida

- Date: November 11th
- Game time: 4:00 p.m. EST
- TV: ESPN+

Game information

First quarter

Second quarter

Third quarter

Fourth quarter

Statistics	East Carolina	Florida Atlantic
First downs		
Plays–yards	–	–
Rushes–yards	–	–
Passing yards		
Passing: comp–att–int	––	––
Turnovers		
Time of possession		

Team	Category	Player	Statistics
East Carolina	Passing		
East Carolina	Rushing		
East Carolina	Receiving		
Florida Atlantic	Passing		
Florida Atlantic	Rushing		
Florida Atlantic	Receiving		

=== at Navy ===
East Carolina Pirates (1–9) vs Navy Midshipmen (4–5) – Game summary

Quarter	1	2	3	4	Total
Pirates	0	0	0	0	0
Midshipmen	7	0	0	3	10

at Navy-Marine Corps Memorial Stadium • Annapolis, Maryland

- Date: November 18th
- Game time: 12:00 p.m. EST
- Game weather: Temperature: 55 °F (13 °C) • Wind: NW at 18 miles per hour (29 km/h) • Weather: Sunny
- Game attendance: 28,708
- Referee: Steven Anderson
- TV announcers (ESPNews): Mike Corey (play-by-play) and Dustin Fox (analyst)

Game information

First quarter

- (2:47) NAVY – Alex Tecza 19-yard run, Nathan Kirkwood kick (Drive: 2 plays, 53 yards, 0:51; Navy 7-0)

Second quarter

No scoring

Third quarter

No scoring

Fourth quarter

- (8:49) NAVY – Nathan Kirkwood 27-yard field goal (Drive: 4 plays, 8 yards, 1:50; Navy 10-0)

Statistics	East Carolina	Navy
First downs	9	13
Plays–yards	60–189	61–276
Rushes–yards	22–34	50–174
Passing yards	155	102
Passing: comp–att–int	24–38–2	10–11–0
Turnovers		
Time of possession	25:56	34:04

Team	Category	Player	Statistics
East Carolina	Passing	Alex Flinn	24/38, 155 yards, 2 INT
East Carolina	Rushing	Alex Flinn	12 carries, 31 yards
East Carolina	Receiving	Chase Sowell	6 receptions, 62 yards
Navy	Passing	Xavier Arline	10/11, 102 yards
Navy	Rushing	Alex Tecza	24 carries, 94 yards, TD
Navy	Receiving	Eli Heidenreich	2 receptions, 53 yards

=== vs Tulsa ===
Tulsa Golden Hurricane (3–8) vs East Carolina Pirates (2–9) – Game summary

Quarter	1	2	3	4	Total
Golden Hurricane	13	7	6	3	29
Pirates	14	10	0	3	27

at Dowdy-Ficklen Stadium • Greenville, North Carolina

- Date: November 25th
- Game time: 2:00 p.m. EST
- Game attendance: 29,567
- TV: ESPN+

Game information

First quarter

Second quarter

Third quarter

Fourth quarter

Statistics	Tulsa	East Carolina
First downs	23	17
Plays–yards	–446	–409
Rushes–yards	33–149	37–225
Passing yards	297	184
Passing: comp–att–int	23–37–1	12–18–2
Turnovers		
Time of possession	30:50	29:10

Team	Category	Player	Statistics
Tulsa	Passing	Kirk Francis	23–37, 297 yards, 2 TD, 1 INT
Tulsa	Rushing	Anthony Watkins	18 carries, 106 yards
Tulsa	Receiving	Kamdyn Benjamin	6 receptions, 143 yards, 1 TD
East Carolina	Passing	Alex Flinn	12–18, 184 yards, 2 TD, 2 INT
East Carolina	Rushing	Rahjai Harris	21 carries, 145 yards, 1 TD
East Carolina	Receiving	Chase Sowell	5 receptions, 108 yards

== Roster ==
2023 East Carolina Pirates football team roster
Players
Coaches
Offense

Pos.	#	Name	Class
WR	0	Jhari Patterson	Jr
WR	1	Jaylen Johnson	Sr
QB	2	Raheim Jeter	Fr
WR	3	Kelan Robinson	So
WR	5	Chase Sowell	Fr
QB	6	Ty Little	Fr
WR	7	Kerry King	So
RB	8	Gerald Green	GS
TE	9	Tyler Savage	Jr
QB	10	Mason Garcia	So
WR	11	Ryan King	Jr
WR	13	Brock Spalding	Fr
QB	14	Patrick Bryan	Fr
QB	15	Alex Flinn	Jr
WR	19	Josh Murphy	Fr
RB	21	Marlon Gunn Jr.	So
RB	22	Jordan McInnis	Fr
RB	23	Joseph McKay	So
WR	25	McCallum Wright	Fr
RB	30	Javious Bond	Fr
TE	34	Jackson Barker	Fr
RB	37	Kamarro Edmonds	So
RB	40	C. J. Armstrong	Fr
TE	45	Mason Brown	Fr
RB	47	Rahjai Harris	Jr
RB	48	Grayson Klue	Fr
OL	52	Parker Moorer	Jr
OL	53	Ryan Beckman	GS
OL	54	Zion Wilson	So
OL	60	Emmanuel Poku	Fr
OL	61	Keziah Everett	Jr
OL	62	Jimarion McCrimon	Fr
OL	63	Jake Crocker	Fr
OL	65	Dustyn Hall	GS
OL	66	Isaiah Foote	Jr
OL	67	Marleo Neolien	Fr
OL	68	Trey Hardison	Fr
OL	70	Kameron Durant	Fr
OL	71	Bryce Weaver	Fr
OL	72	William Coats	Fr
OL	73	Owen Murphy	GS
OL	74	Hampton Ergle	Jr
OL	75	Omari Allen	Fr
OL	76	Jacob Sacra	Fr
OL	77	Walter Stribling	Jr
OL	78	Richard Pearce	So
OL	79	Elisha Samples	Fr
TE	80	Shane Calhoun	Jr
TE	81	Desirrio Riles	Fr
WR	82	Jarett Garner	GS
WR	83	Bleu Coleman	Fr
WR	84	Zion Agnew	Fr
TE	85	Antonio Ferguson	Fr
WR	86	Ryan Stephens	Fr
WR	88	Jsi Hatfield	Sr
WR	89	Malik Leverett	Fr

Defense

Pos.	#	Name	Class
LB	2	BJ Davis	GS
DL	3	Chad Stephens	Jr
S	4	Julius Wood	Sr
OLB	5	Jack Powers	Sr
LB	6	Teylor Jackson	Jr
OLB	7	Samuel Dankah	So
DB	9	Teagan Wilk	Jr
LB	10	TyQuan King	Jr
DB	10	Rico Watkins	Fr
OLB	11	Jeremy Lewis	Sr
DB	12	Timothy Patterson	Fr
DL	13	Eric Doctor Jr.	Jr
DB	14	Antione Jackson	Fr
DB	15	Jonathan Jones	GS
DB	17	Devon King	Jr
DB	20	Ty Moss	So
DB	21	Jordan Huff	Jr
LB	22	Mike Edwards III	Jr
LB	23	Greg Turner III	Fr
DB	24	TyMir Brown	So
LB	25	Kingston McKinstry	Jr
DB	26	Isaiah Brown-Murray	Fr
DB	27	Dontavius Nash	So
DB	28	Shavon Revel	Jr
DB	30	Dru Dotter	So
DB	31	Rance Conner	So
LB	32	RaRa Dillworth	Jr
LB	33	Zakye Barker	Fr
DB	35	Javion Clark	Fr
DB	37	Adam Cole	Fr
DB	38	Daylyn Diston	Fr
DB	39	Omar Rogers	GS
DL	40	Jason Shuford	Jr
LB	41	DJ Johnson Jr.	Fr
LB	42	Julien Davis	Fr
DL	44	Preston Carr	Fr
DB	45	Kamaurri McKinley	Fr
DB	46	Melvin Jacobs	So
LB	47	No'Tavien Green	Fr
DB	49	Josh Benton	Fr
DL	50	Kieran Davis	Fr
LB	51	Jamari Young	Fr
DL	53	Suirad Ware	Jr
LB	54	Brady Blalock	Fr
DL	55	Jasiyah Robinson	So
DL	56	D'Anta Johnson	Jr
DL	57	Ajani "AJ" Farmer	Fr
DL	59	Demoris Jenkins	Fr
DL	90	Elijah Morris	Jr
DL	91	Kyler Puckett	Fr
DL	92	C. J. Mims	Fr
DL	94	Xavier McIver	So
DL	94	Carson Parker	Fr
DL	97	Logan Wright	Fr
DL	99	J. D. Lampley	So

Special teams

Pos.	#	Name	Class
P	12	Luke Larson	So
K	31	Carson Smith	So
P	38	David Chapeau	Jr
LS	41	Tripp Smith	Fr
LS	43	Colby Garfield	So
K	44	Ryan Capriotti	Fr
LS	49	Alex Harper	Jr
LS	57	Brock Winstead	Fr
K	95	Andrew Conrad	So
P	96	Archer Trafford	GS
K	98	Jerry Rice	Jr
K	99	Laith Marjan	So

Head coach

- Mike Houston

Coordinators/assistant coaches

- Donnie Kirkpatrick – Offensive coordinator/Quarterbacks
- Blake Harrell – Defensive coordinator/Inside linebackers
- Tim Daoust – Special teams coordinator/Outside linebackers/Defensive ends
- Aaron Auer – Inside receivers/Tight ends
- Re'quan Boyette – Running backs
- Allen Mogridge – Offensive linemen
- Jules Montinar – Defensive passing game coordinator/Cornerbacks
- Dyrell Roberts – Outside receivers
- Roy Tesh – Defensive tackles
- Tripp Weaver – Safeties
- Shane Montgomery – Senior offensive analyst
- Tyler Almond – Defensive analyst
- Kyle Deween – Special teams analyst
- Deveonte Mackey – Offensive staff assistant
- Mark Hatcher – Graduate assistant
- Khyle Jackson – Graduate assistant
- Cameron Nichols – Graduate assistant
- John Williams Jr. – Director, Strength and Conditioning

Legend

- (C) Team captain
- (S) Suspended
- (I) Ineligible
- Injured
- Redshirt

Roster
Last update: 11/18/24

== Rankings ==
Ranking movements
	Week															
Poll	Pre	1	2	3	4	5	6	7	8	9	10	11	12	13	14	Final
AP																
Coaches																
CFP	Not released															Not released

== Statistics ==
=== Team ===
	East Carolina	Opp
Points per game		
Total		
First downs		
Rushing		
Passing		
Penalty		
Rushing yards		
Avg per play		
Avg per game		
Rushing touchdowns		
Passing yards		
Att-Comp-Int		
Avg per pass		
Avg per catch		
Avg per game		
Passing touchdowns		
Total offense		
Avg per play		
Avg per game		
Fumbles-Lost		
Penalties-Yards		
Avg per game		
Punts-Yards		
Avg per punt		
Time of possession/Game		
3rd down conversions		
4th down conversions		
Touchdowns scored		
Field goals-Attempts		
PAT-Attempts		
Attendance		
Games/Avg per Game		
Neutral Site		

=== Offense ===
Passing statistics
#	NAME	POS	RAT	CMP	ATT	YDS	AVG/G	CMP%	TD	INT	LONG
		QB	–	–	–	–	–	–	–	–	–
		QB	–	–	–	–	–	–	–	–	–
		QB	–	–	–	–	–	–	–	–	–
		QB	–	–	–	–	–	–	–	–	–
	TOTALS		–	–	–	–	–	–	–	–	–

Rushing statistics
#	NAME	POS	ATT	GAIN	AVG	TD	LONG	AVG/G
		RB	–	–	–	–	–	–
		RB	–	–	–	–	–	–
		RB	–	–	–	–	–	–
		RB	–	–	–	–	–	–
		RB	–	–	–	–	–	–
		RB	–	–	–	–	–	–
	TOTALS		–	–	–	–	–	–

Receiving statistics
#	NAME	POS	CTH	YDS	AVG	TD	LONG	AVG/G
		WR	–	–	–	–	–	–
		WR	–	–	–	–	–	–
		WR	–	–	–	–	–	–
		WR	–	–	–	–	–	–
		WR	–	–	–	–	–	–
		WR	–	–	–	–	–	–
		WR	–	–	–	–	–	–
		WR	–	–	–	–	–	–
		WR	–	–	–	–	–	–
		TE	–	–	–	–	–	–
		TE	–	–	–	–	–	–
		TE	–	–	–	–	–	–
		TE	–	–	–	–	–	–
		TE	–	–	–	–	–	–
	TOTALS		–	–	–	–	–	–

=== Defense ===
Defense statistics
#	NAME	POS	SOLO	AST	TOT	TFL-YDS	SACK-YDS	INT-YDS	BU	QBH	FR	FF	BLK	SAF	TD
		DL	–	–	–	–	–	–	–	–	–	–	–	–	–
		DL	–	–	–	–	–	–	–	–	–	–	–	–	–
		DL	–	–	–	–	–	–	–	–	–	–	–	–	–
		DL	–	–	–	–	–	–	–	–	–	–	–	–	–
		DL	–	–	–	–	–	–	–	–	–	–	–	–	–
		DL	–	–	–	–	–	–	–	–	–	–	–	–	–
		DL	–	–	–	–	–	–	–	–	–	–	–	–	–
		DL	–	–	–	–	–	–	–	–	–	–	–	–	–
		DL	–	–	–	–	–	–	–	–	–	–	–	–	–
		DL	–	–	–	–	–	–	–	–	–	–	–	–	–
		DL	–	–	–	–	–	–	–	–	–	–	–	–	–
		DL	–	–	–	–	–	–	–	–	–	–	–	–	–
		DL	–	–	–	–	–	–	–	–	–	–	–	–	–
		DL	–	–	–	–	–	–	–	–	–	–	–	–	–
		DL	–	–	–	–	–	–	–	–	–	–	–	–	–
		DL	–	–	–	–	–	–	–	–	–	–	–	–	–
		RUSH	–	–	–	–	–	–	–	–	–	–	–	–	–
		RUSH	–	–	–	–	–	–	–	–	–	–	–	–	–
		RUSH	–	–	–	–	–	–	–	–	–	–	–	–	–
		RUSH	–	–	–	–	–	–	–	–	–	–	–	–	–
		RUSH	–	–	–	–	–	–	–	–	–	–	–	–	–
		LB	–	–	–	–	–	–	–	–	–	–	–	–	–
		LB	–	–	–	–	–	–	–	–	–	–	–	–	–
		LB	–	–	–	–	–	–	–	–	–	–	–	–	–
		LB	–	–	–	–	–	–	–	–	–	–	–	–	–
		LB	–	–	–	–	–	–	–	–	–	–	–	–	–
		LB	–	–	–	–	–	–	–	–	–	–	–	–	–
		LB	–	–	–	–	–	–	–	–	–	–	–	–	–
		DB	–	–	–	–	–	–	–	–	–	–	–	–	–
		DB	–	–	–	–	–	–	–	–	–	–	–	–	–
		DB	–	–	–	–	–	–	–	–	–	–	–	–	–
		DB	–	–	–	–	–	–	–	–	–	–	–	–	–
		DB	–	–	–	–	–	–	–	–	–	–	–	–	–
		DB	–	–	–	–	–	–	–	–	–	–	–	–	–
		DB	–	–	–	–	–	–	–	–	–	–	–	–	–
		DB	–	–	–	–	–	–	–	–	–	–	–	–	–
		DB	–	–	–	–	–	–	–	–	–	–	–	–	–
		DB	–	–	–	–	–	–	–	–	–	–	–	–	–
		DB	–	–	–	–	–	–	–	–	–	–	–	–	–
		DB	–	–	–	–	–	–	–	–	–	–	–	–	–
		DB	–	–	–	–	–	–	–	–	–	–	–	–	–
		DB	–	–	–	–	–	–	–	–	–	–	–	–	–
		DB	–	–	–	–	–	–	–	–	–	–	–	–	–
		DB	–	–	–	–	–	–	–	–	–	–	–	–	–
–		DB	–	–	–	–	–	–	–	–	–	–	–	–	–
	Team		–	–	–	–	–	–	–	–	–	–	–	–	–
	TOTAL		–	–	–	–	–	–	–	–	–	–	–	–	–

Key: POS: Position, SOLO: Solo Tackles, AST: Assisted Tackles, TOT: Total Tackles, TFL: Tackles-for-loss, SACK: Quarterback Sacks, INT: Interceptions, BU: Passes Broken Up, PD: Passes Defended, QBH: Quarterback Hits, FR: Fumbles Recovered, FF: Forced Fumbles, BLK: Kicks or Punts Blocked, SAF: Safeties, TD : Touchdown

=== Special teams ===
Kicking statistics
#	NAME	POS	XPM	XPA	XP%	FGM	FGA	FG%	1–19	20–29	30–39	40–49	50+	LNG
		K	–	–	–	–	–	–	0/0	0/0	0/0	0/0	0/0	–
		K	–	–	–	–	–	–	0/0	0/0	0/0	0/0	0/0	–
	TOTALS		–	–	–	–	–	–	0/0	0/0	0/0	0/0	0/0	–

Kickoff statistics
#	NAME	POS	KICKS	YDS	AVG	TB	OB
–	–	–	–	–	–	–	–
	TOTALS		–	–	–	–	–

Punting statistics
#	NAME	POS	PUNTS	YDS	AVG	LONG	TB	I–20	50+	BLK
		P	–	–	–	–	–	–	–	–
		P	–	–	–	–	–	–	–	–
	TOTALS		–	–	–	–	–	–	–	–

Kick return statistics
#	NAME	POS	RTNS	YDS	AVG	TD	LNG
			–	–	–	–	–
	TOTALS		–	–	–	–	–

Punt return statistics
#	NAME	POS	RTNS	YDS	AVG	TD	LONG
			–	–	–	–	–
	TOTALS		–	–	–	–	–

=== Scoring ===
==== East Carolina vs non-conference opponents ====
	1	2	3	4	Total
East Carolina	0	0	0	0	0
Opponents	0	0	0	0	0

==== East Carolina vs AAC opponents ====
	1	2	3	4	Total
East Carolina	0	0	0	0	0
Opponents	0	0	0	0	0

==== East Carolina vs all opponents ====
	1	2	3	4	Total
East Carolina	0	0	0	0	0
Opponents	0	0	0	0	0
