= East Carolina–NC State rivalry =

American college football rivalry

- East Carolina Pirates NC State Wolfpack
- Sport: Football, baseball, others
- First meeting: 1970

Locations of East Carolina and NC State

The East Carolina–NC State rivalry, also known as the Battle for the Barrel, is a rivalry between East Carolina University and North Carolina State University. Both teams are located in North Carolina. The intensity of the rivalry is driven by the proximity (both are UNC system schools and are only 83 miles apart via U.S. Highway 264) and the size of the two schools (NC State is the largest university in the state and East Carolina is the fourth largest).

East Carolina was founded in 1907 as a normal school. It became a four-year institution in 1920 and was renamed East Carolina Teachers College. It then became East Carolina College in 1951 and East Carolina University in 1967. East Carolina joined the UNC System in 1972.

North Carolina State was founded in 1887 as a land-grant college. Its original name was North Carolina College of Agriculture and Mechanic Arts. In 1918, it changed its name to North Carolina State College of Agriculture and Engineering. In 1931, the school moved to under the Consolidated University of North Carolina and was renamed North Carolina State College of Agriculture and Engineering of the University of North Carolina. It once again was renamed North Carolina State of the University of North Carolina at Raleigh in 1963 and received its current name in 1965.

== Football ==
East Carolina–NC State football rivalry
- East Carolina Pirates NC State Wolfpack
- Sport: Football
- First meeting: October 10, 1970; NC State, 23–6
- Latest meeting: August 28, 2025; NC State, 24–17
- Next meeting: September 2, 2028
- Trophy: Victory Barrel

Statistics
- Total meetings: 34
- All-time series: NC State leads, 20–14
- Largest victory: NC State, 58–3 (2018)
- Longest win streak: NC State, 5 (1978–1982)
- Current win streak: NC State, 1 (2025–present)

The two teams began competing against each other in 1970. The football series between the two teams was suspended in 1987. Jim Valvano terminated NC State’s scheduling of East Carolina after Pirate fans tore down goal posts and the playing surface at Carter–Finley in 1987. NC State’s athletics administration had publicly warned ECU and Pirate fans after two consecutive years of minor vandalisms to the stadium. The schools would meet again in the 1992 Peach Bowl. In 1996, the two schools met in Charlotte's Bank of America Stadium rather than on either school's home field. In 1997, the North Carolina Legislature proposed a bill demanding that UNC and N.C. State must play East Carolina once every two years. This would officially revive the series between East Carolina and N.C. State. In 2024, The two schools were chosen to play in the 2024 Military Bowl. East Carolina would win 26–21, but in the remaining 38 seconds, a massive brawl broke out between the two schools, including wounding a referee. NC State won the latest meeting in Raleigh, 24-17, and has won 4 out of the last 5 meetings.

East Carolina and NC State have met on the football field 34 times, with 25 of those games played in Carter–Finley Stadium, 5 in Dowdy–Ficklen Stadium, and 4 in neutral venues. The highest profile game was played in the 1992 Peach Bowl, with 59,322 fans in attendance, this game would officially go on record as the largest attendance at the time for a game between two North Carolina college football teams.

NC State leads the all-time series, with 20 wins to East Carolina's 14 wins.

=== Victory Barrel ===
In 2007, the Student Government Associations of both North Carolina State University and East Carolina University in a cooperative agreement began awarding the ‘Victory Barrel’ to the game winner. The outer face of the barrel is affixed with engraved colored plates denoting the year, final score, and winner of each contest dating back to 1970. According to the 'Legend of the Victory Barrel', the Barrel is said to have belonged to two brothers who lived on a farm in eastern North Carolina that developed a fierce rivalry in their youth. They would use the Barrel to keep tally of every victory one had over the other, ranging from academic, athletic, and financial success. Eventually the competitions became so fierce that the two opted to go to separate schools, East Carolina and North Carolina State respectively, to stay as far away form one another as possible. The legend is entirely fictitious and was created as a collaboration between the Student Government Associations of East Carolina and NC State. The legend serves as a metaphor for the intimacy and hostility of the rivalry between not just the schools but also the traditional Piedmont and Coastal Plain regions of the state.

=== Football game results ===
East Carolina victories	NC State victories

No.	Date	Location	Winner	Score
1	October 10, 1970	Raleigh, NC	NC State	23–6
2	October 23, 1971	Raleigh, NC	East Carolina	31–15
3	October 21, 1972	Raleigh, NC	NC State	38–16
4	September 8, 1973	Raleigh, NC	#17 NC State	57–8
5	October 5, 1974	Raleigh, NC	#8 NC State	24–20
6	September 6, 1975	Raleigh, NC	#13 NC State	26–3
7	September 18, 1976	Raleigh, NC	East Carolina	23–14
8	September 3, 1977	Raleigh, NC	East Carolina	28–23
9	September 9, 1978	Raleigh, NC	NC State	29–13
10	September 8, 1979	Raleigh, NC	NC State	34–20
11	November 11, 1980	Raleigh, NC	NC State	36–14
12	September 19, 1981	Raleigh, NC	NC State	31–10
13	September 11, 1982	Raleigh, NC	NC State	33–26
14	September 10, 1983	Raleigh, NC	East Carolina	22–16
15	September 29, 1984	Raleigh, NC	NC State	31–22
16	September 7, 1985	Raleigh, NC	East Carolina	33–14
17	September 6, 1986	Raleigh, NC	NC State	38–10
18	September 5, 1987	Raleigh, NC	East Carolina	32–14

No.	Date	Location	Winner	Score
19	January 1, 1992	Atlanta, GA	#12 East Carolina	37–34
20	November 30, 1996	Charlotte, NC	East Carolina	50–29
21	November 22, 1997	Raleigh, NC	NC State	37–24
22	November 20, 1999	Greenville, NC	#23 East Carolina	23–6
23	November 27, 2004	Charlotte, NC	NC State	52–14
24	November 25, 2006	Raleigh, NC	East Carolina	21–16
25	October 20, 2007	Greenville, NC	NC State	34–20
26	September 20, 2008	Raleigh, NC	NC State	30–24^{OT}
27	October 16, 2010	Greenville, NC	East Carolina	33–27^{OT}
28	November 23, 2013	Raleigh, NC	East Carolina	42–28
29	September 10, 2016	Greenville, NC	East Carolina	33–30
30	December 1, 2018	Raleigh, NC	NC State	58–3
31	August 31, 2019	Raleigh, NC	NC State	34–6
32	September 3, 2022	Greenville, NC	#13 NC State	21–20
33	December 28, 2024	Annapolis, MD	East Carolina	26–21
34	August 28, 2025	Raleigh, NC	NC State	24–17
Series: NC State leads 20–14

== Men's basketball ==
East Carolina–N.C. State men's basketball rivalry
- East Carolina Pirates NC State Wolfpack
- First meeting: January 20, 1968; NC State 83, East Carolina 67
- Latest meeting: December 21, 2013; NC State 90, East Carolina 79

Statistics
- Total meetings: 21
- All-time series: NC State leads, 20–1 (.952)
- Largest victory: NC State, 117–81 (1975)
- Longest win streak: NC State, 17 (1968–2006)
- Current win streak: NC State, 3 (2008–present)

NC State currently leads the series 20–1. NC State won the most recent matchup between the two teams 90–79 on December 21, 2013, at PNC Arena. There are currently no scheduled games between the two teams.

=== Basketball game results ===
East Carolina victories	NC State victories

No.	Date	Location	Winner	Score
1	January 1, 1968	Raleigh, NC	NC State	83–67
2	January 15, 1970	Raleigh, NC	NC State	100–81
3	February 26, 1972	Raleigh, NC	NC State	92–57
4	February 13, 1973	Raleigh, NC	NC State	105–70
5	December 5, 1973	Raleigh, NC	NC State	79–47
6	November 30, 1974	Raleigh, NC	NC State	98–81
7	December 3, 1975	Raleigh, NC	NC State	117–81
8	December 30, 1976	Raleigh, NC	NC State	92–69
9	December 17, 1977	Raleigh, NC	NC State	106–80
10	January 23, 1979	Raleigh, NC	NC State	104–86
11	January 2, 1980	Raleigh, NC	NC State	83–68

No.	Date	Location	Winner	Score
12	January 24, 1981	Raleigh, NC	NC State	77–52
13	January 23, 1982	Raleigh, NC	NC State	63–53
14	December 8, 1982	Raleigh, NC	NC State	57–49
15	November 16, 2001	Raleigh, NC	NC State	71–47
16	November 19, 2004	Raleigh, NC	NC State	100–66
17	December 28, 2006	Raleigh, NC	NC State	64–57
18	December 8, 2007	Greenville, NC	East Carolina	75–69
19	December 17, 2008	Raleigh, NC	NC State	87–67
20	November 18, 2010	Charleston, SC	NC State	85–65
21	December 21, 2013	Raleigh, NC	NC State	90–79
Series: NC State leads 20–1

== Baseball ==
East Carolina–N.C. State baseball rivalry
- East Carolina Pirates NC State Wolfpack
- First meeting: 1957; East Carolina 5, NC State 4
- Latest meeting: April 8, 2025; East Carolina 1, NC State 4

Statistics
- Total meetings: 113
- All-time series: NC State leads, 72–42 (.630)
- Current win streak: NC State, 1 (2025–present)

The most prominent sport in the rivalry is baseball, with the two teams having played 113 times. NC State leads the series 71–43. The two teams played twice during the 2022 season in Greenville and Raleigh, with NC State sweeping the season series. NC State went to Greenville and shut out ECU, 2–0, on March 29, 2022. On April 26, 2022, NC State finished off the 2nd meeting by beating ECU in Raleigh, 12–3. In 2023, NC State and ECU split their 2 game series, with ECU winning in Greenville and NC State winning in Raleigh.

== See also ==
- List of NCAA college football rivalry games
