= Alex Flinn (American football) =

American football player

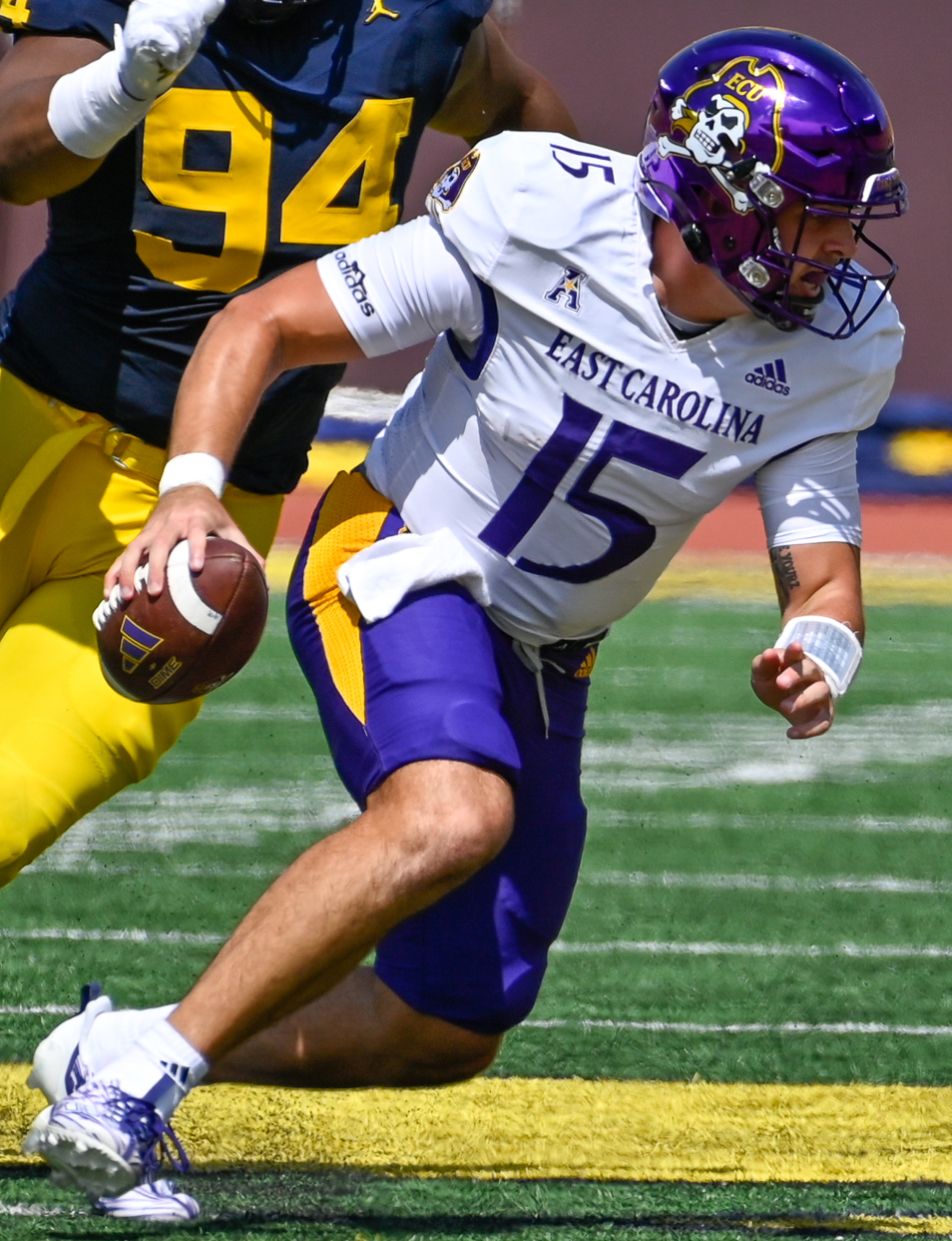
- Flinn with East Carolina in 2023

No. 15
- Position: Quarterback

Personal information
- Listed height: 6 ft 1 in (1.85 m)
- Listed weight: 233 lb (106 kg)

Career information
- High school: A. C. Reynolds (Asheville, North Carolina)
- College: East Carolina (2019–2023)
- Stats at ESPN

Alex Flinn is an American former college football quarterback who played for the East Carolina Pirates.

== Early life ==
Flinn grew up in Fletcher, North Carolina and attended A. C. Reynolds High School where he lettered in football and baseball. In his high school career, Flinn completed 534 of his 829 pass attempts for 7,431 yards, 76 touchdowns and 20 interceptions. Flinn also rushed for 1,088 yards and 24 touchdowns, while hauling in nine receptions for 68 yards. He was rated a three-star recruit and committed to play college football at East Carolina University.

== College career ==
Flinn was redshirted during his true freshman season with the Pirates in 2019 and was on the developmental roster. During the 2020 season, he earned inclusion on the weekly dress-out roster but did not play in a game due to the COVID-19 pandemic. During the 2021 season, he earned inclusion on the weekly dress-out roster for the second year in a row and did not play in a game. During the 2022 season, he appeared in two games and finished the season by logging five snaps.

During the 2023 season, Flinn was named the starting quarterback during the Week 3 game against Appalachian State. He finished the game completing 17 out of 31 passing attempts for 158 yards with three interceptions along with one solo stop. During the Week 4 game against Gardner–Webb, he completed eight out of 18 passing attempts for 94 yards with a touchdown. During the Week 5 game against Rice, he completed a career high 21 out of 44 passing attempts for 246 yards with an interception. During the Week 9 game against Tulane, Flinn completed a 10/18 throwing stat line with 125 total yards along with leading the team with a 13 play and 71 yard drive game.

On January 23, 2024, Flinn announced that he would move on from football and forgo his final year of eligibility.

=== Statistics ===
Year	team	Games			Passing								Rushing			
Year	team	GP	GS	Record	Comp	Att	Pct	Yards	Avg	TD	Int	Rate	Att	Yards	Avg	TD
2019	East Carolina	0	0	—	Redshirt											
2020	East Carolina	0	0	—	Did not play											
2021	East Carolina	0	0	—	Did not play											
2022	East Carolina	2	0	—	0	0	0.0	0	0.0	0	0	0.0	0	0	0.0	0
2023	East Carolina	12	9	2−7	159	290	54.8	1,558	5.4	6	12	98.5	96	188	2.0	0
Career		14	9	2−7	159	290	54.8	1,558	5.4	6	12	98.5	96	188	2.0	0
