= Mason Garcia =

American football player

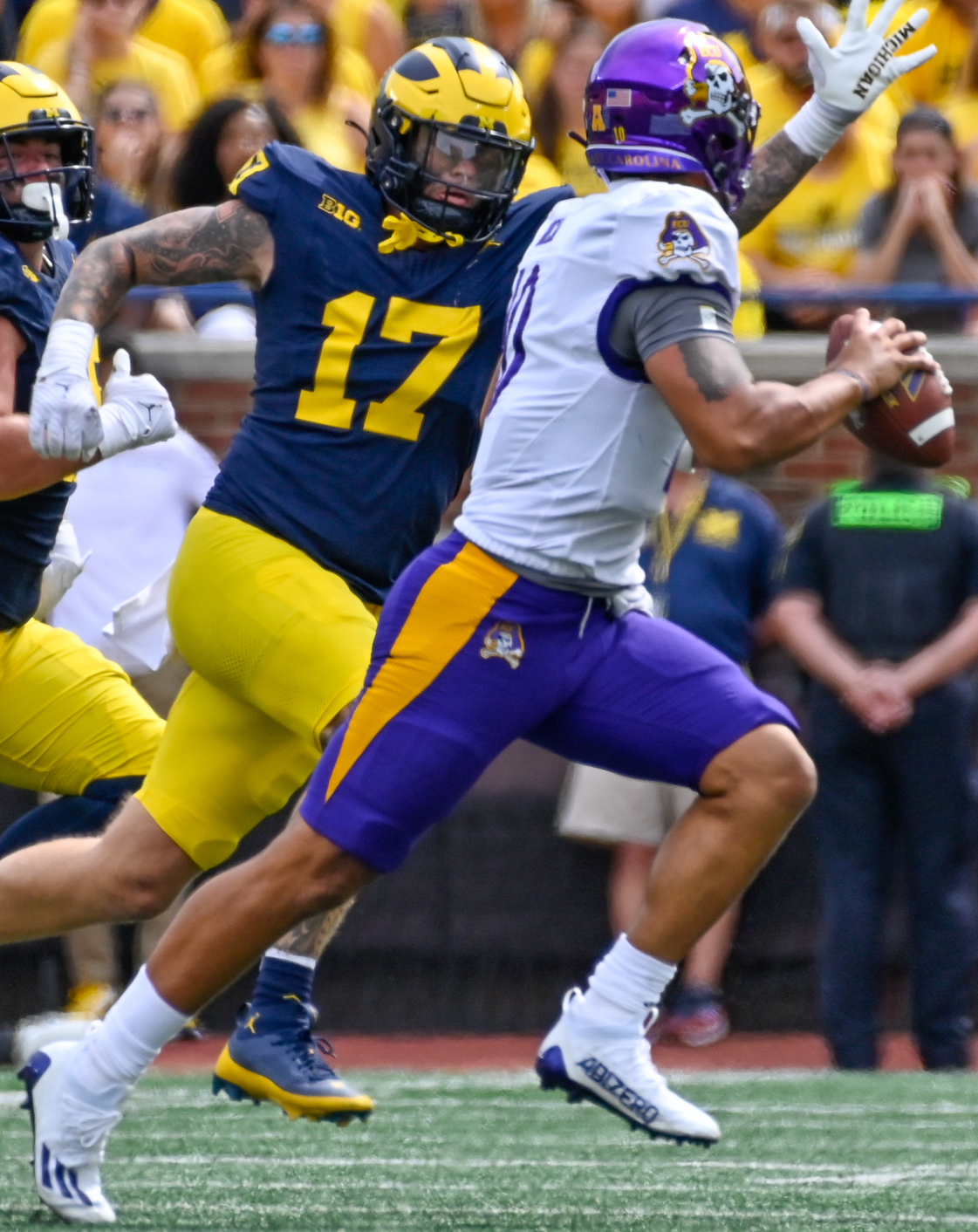
- Garcia with East Carolina in 2023

No. 12 – Austin Peay Governors
- Position: Quarterback
- Class: Redshirt Senior

Personal information
- Listed height: 6 ft 5 in (1.96 m)
- Listed weight: 249 lb (113 kg)

Career information
- High school: Carolina Forest (Carolina Forest, South Carolina)
- College: East Carolina (2020–2023); Austin Peay (2024–present)
- Stats at ESPN

Mason Garcia is an American college football quarterback for the Austin Peay Governors. He previously played for the East Carolina Pirates.

== Early life ==
Garcia grew up in Myrtle Beach, South Carolina and attended Carolina Forest High School where he lettered in football and basketball. He was rated a four-star recruit and committed to play college football at East Carolina over offers from Appalachian State, Bowling Green, Charlotte, Cincinnati, Coastal Carolina, Colorado State, Kent State, Missouri, Pittsburgh, Syracuse and Youngstown State.

== College career ==
=== East Carolina ===
During Garcia's true freshman season in 2020, he appeared in three games and started one of them as Holton Ahlers's top backup quarterback. He finished the season with completing 10 out of 23 passing attempts for 104 yards while rushing 19 times for 87 yards. During the 2021 season, he played in six games in a reserve role. He finished the season with completing two out of three passing attempts for 21 yards, one touchdown and a pick. During the 2022 season, he appeared in three games in a reserve role at quarterback. He finished the season with completing seven out of 12 passing attempts for 54 yards while rushing five times for 14 yards.

During the 2023 season, he started the Week 1 game against Michigan during the first quarter where he completed 11 out of 18 passing attempts for 80 yards with an interception while rushing eight times for 36 yards. He also started the Week 2 game against Marshall where he completed 10 out of 23 passing attempts for 62 yards with a touchdown and an interception while also rushing 16 times for 118 yards. He entered the transfer portal on December 4, 2023.

=== Austin Peay ===
On December 13, 2023, Garcia announced that he would be transferring to Austin Peay. Garcia started the season opener against Louisville, but sustained an injury in the second quarter that ended his season.

=== Statistics ===
Year	Team	Games			Passing								Rushing			
Year	Team	GP	GS	Record	Comp	Att	Pct	Yards	Avg	TD	Int	Rate	Att	Yards	Avg	TD
2020	East Carolina	3	1	0−1	10	23	43.5	104	4.5	0	0	81.5	19	87	4.6	1
2021	East Carolina	6	0	—	2	3	66.7	21	7.0	1	1	168.8	8	19	2.4	1
2022	East Carolina	3	0	—	7	12	58.3	54	4.5	0	0	96.1	5	14	2.8	0
2023	East Carolina	8	3	0−3	48	95	50.5	408	4.3	1	2	85.9	50	227	4.5	2
2024	Austin Peay	1	1	0−1	3	8	37.5	19	2.4	0	0	57.4	6	7	1.2	0
Career		21	5	0−5	70	141	49.6	606	4.3	2	3	86.2	88	354	4.0	4
