= 2024 Military Bowl =

Postseason college football bowl game

2024 Go Bowling Military Bowl
- 15th Military Bowl
| East Carolina Pirates | NC State Wolfpack |
| (7–5) | (6–6) |
| The American | ACC |
| 26 | 21 |
| Head coach: Blake Harrell | Head coach: Dave Doeren |
| | 1 | 2 | 3 | 4 | Total |
|---|---|---|---|---|---|
| East Carolina | 7 | 6 | 7 | 6 | 26 |
| NC State | 0 | 7 | 0 | 14 | 21 |
- Date: December 28, 2024
- Season: 2024
- Stadium: Navy–Marine Corps Memorial Stadium
- Location: Annapolis, Maryland
- MVP: Rahjai Harris (RB, East Carolina)
- Favorite: NC State by 7.5
- Referee: Jonathan Noli (Mountain West)
- Attendance: 23,981

United States TV coverage
- Network: ESPN
- Announcers: Jay Alter (play-by-play), Rocky Boiman (analyst), and Alex Chappell (sideline)

The 2024 Military Bowl was a college football bowl game played on December 28, 2024, at Navy–Marine Corps Memorial Stadium located in Annapolis, Maryland. The 15th annual Military Bowl featured East Carolina and NC State. The game began at approximately 5:45 p.m. EST and aired on ESPN. The Military Bowl was one of the 2024–25 bowl games concluding the 2024 FBS football season. The game was sponsored by GoBowling.com and was officially known as the Go Bowling Military Bowl.

East Carolina pulled away late but the game was marred by a brawl that saw an official get a gash on his face and both teams having players ejected (three from East Carolina, five from NC State).

== Teams ==
The matchup of East Carolina of the American Athletic Conference ("The American") and NC State of the Atlantic Coast Conference (ACC) was announced on December 8.

=== East Carolina Pirates ===
East Carolina compiled a 7–5 regular-season record (5–3 in conference). The Pirates faced one ranked team, losing to Army. East Carolina changed head coaches during the season—Mike Houston led the team through the first seven games (the team went 3–4), with Blake Harrell then taking over.

=== NC State Wolfpack ===
NC State ended their regular season with a 6–6 record (3–5 in conference). The Wolfpack faced two ranked FBS teams, losing to Tennessee and Clemson.

== Game summary ==
2024 Military Bowl

| Quarter | 1 | 2 | 3 | 4 | Total |
|---|---|---|---|---|---|
| East Carolina | 7 | 6 | 7 | 6 | 26 |
| NC State | 0 | 7 | 0 | 14 | 21 |

at Navy–Marine Corps Memorial Stadium • Annapolis, Maryland

- Date: Saturday, December 28, 2024
- Game time: 5:50 p.m. EST
- Game weather: Cloudy • Temperature: 47 °F (8 °C) • Wind: 5 mph (8.0 km/h) east
- Game attendance: 23,981
- Referee: Jon Noli
- TV announcers (ESPN): Jay Alter (play-by-play), Rocky Boiman (analyst), and Alex Chappell (sideline)
- Box score

Scoring summary

| Quarter | Time | Drive | | | Team | Scoring information | Score | |
| Quarter | Time | Plays | Yards | TOP | Team | Scoring information | ECU | NCSU |
|---|---|---|---|---|---|---|---|---|
| 1 | 4:43 | 10 | 75 | 3:55 | ECU | Katin Houser 19-yard touchdown run, Noah Perez kick good | 7 | 0 |
| 2 | 7:17 | 14 | 74 | 6:17 | ECU | 24-yard field goal by Noah Perez | 10 | 0 |
| 2 | 1:58 | 11 | 78 | 5:19 | NCSU | Dacari Collins 8-yard touchdown reception from CJ Bailey, Kanoah Vinesett kick good | 10 | 7 |
| 2 | 0:06 | 11 | 51 | 1:52 | ECU | 42-yard field goal by Noah Perez | 13 | 7 |
| 3 | 9:17 | 12 | 75 | 5:43 | ECU | Katin Houser 4-yard touchdown run, Noah Perez kick good | 20 | 7 |
| 4 | 13:04 | 9 | 72 | 3:19 | NCSU | Justin Joly 15-yard touchdown reception from CJ Bailey, Kanoah Vinesett kick good | 20 | 14 |
| 4 | 9:49 | 3 | 60 | 1:33 | NCSU | Hollywood Smothers 33-yard touchdown reception from CJ Bailey, Kanoah Vinesett kick good | 20 | 21 |
| 4 | 1:33 | 3 | 86 | 0:26 | ECU | Rahjai Harris 86-yard touchdown run, 2-point pass no good | 26 | 21 |
| "TOP" = time of possession. For other American football terms, see Glossary of American football. | | | | | | | 26 | 21 |

=== Statistics ===
| Statistics | ECU | NCSU |
|---|---|---|
| First downs | 22 | 21 |
| Plays–yards | 68–473 | 61–428 |
| Rushes–yards | 39–326 | 35–198 |
| Passing yards | 147 | 230 |
| Passing: comp–att–int | 18–29–2 | 19–26–1 |
| Time of possession | 26:37 | 33:23 |

| Team | Category | Player | Statistics |
|---|---|---|---|
| East Carolina | Passing | Katin Houser | 18/29, 147 yards, 2 INT |
| East Carolina | Rushing | Rahjai Harris | 17 carries, 220 yards, TD |
| East Carolina | Receiving | Yannick Smith | 3 receptions, 56 yards |
| NC State | Passing | CJ Bailey | 19/26, 230 yards, 3 TD, INT |
| NC State | Rushing | Hollywood Smothers | 15 carries, 139 yards |
| NC State | Receiving | Noah Rogers | 5 receptions, 59 yards |
