= Blake Harrell =

American football coach (born 1979)

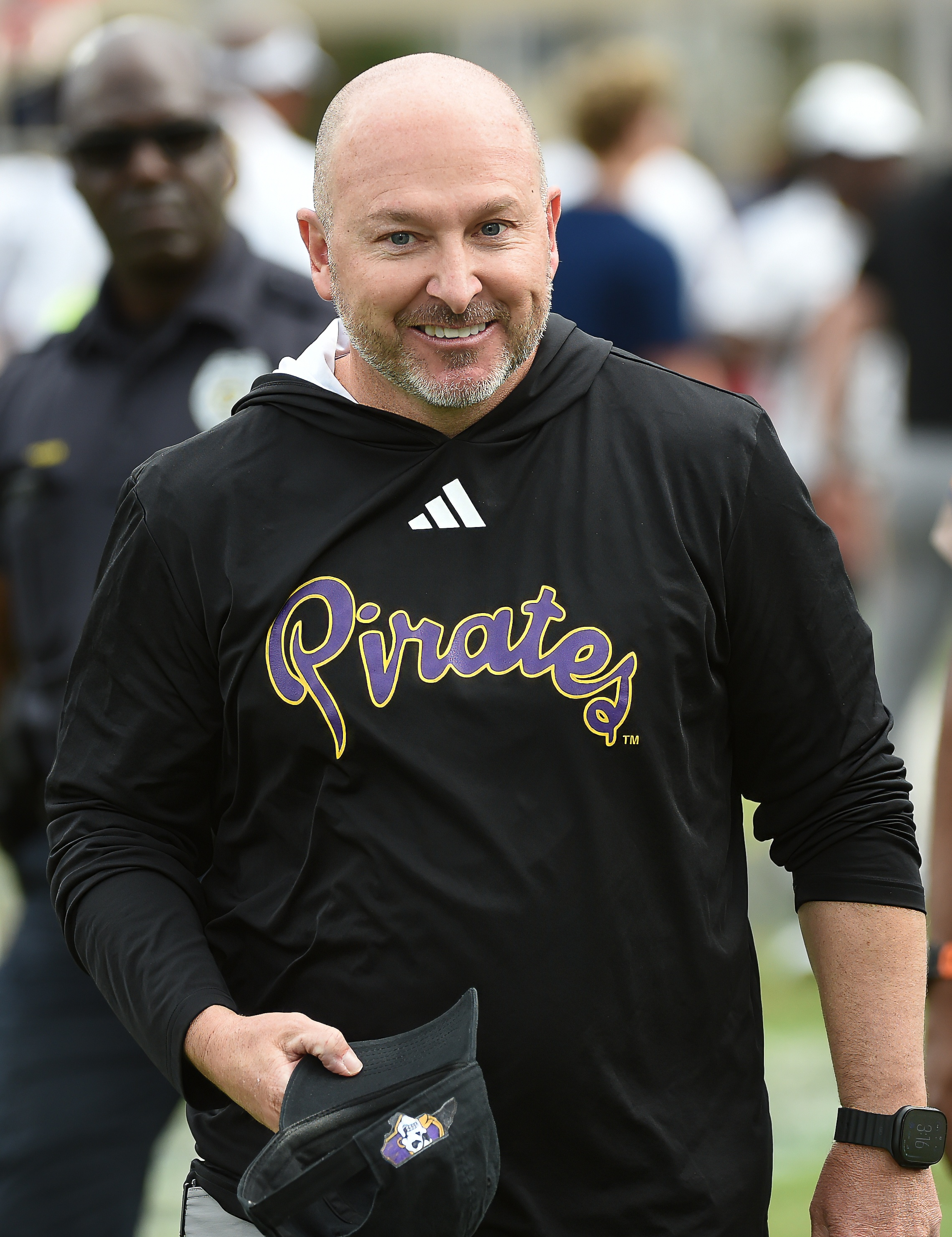
- Harrell as ECU head coach in 2025

Current position
- Title: Head coach
- Team: East Carolina
- Conference: American
- Record: 21–9

Biographical details
- Born: October 20, 1979 (age 47)
- Education: Western Carolina University (2002); Lenoir–Rhyne University

Coaching career (HC unless noted)
- 2001–2002: Western Carolina (SA)
- 2003: McDowell HS (NC) (asst.)
- 2004: Fuquay-Varina HS (NC) (DC)
- 2005: Franklin HS (NC) (DB)
- 2006: Franklin HS (NC) (DC)
- 2007–2013: Lenoir–Rhyne (DC/ST/LB/RC)
- 2014–2018: The Citadel (DC/LB)
- 2019: Kennesaw State (DC/LB)
- 2020–2024: East Carolina (DC/ILB)
- 2024–present: East Carolina

Head coaching record
- Overall: 21–9
- Bowls: 2–0

Blake Harrell (born October 20, 1979) is an American football coach. He is the head football coach at East Carolina University, a position he had held since the 2024 season.

== Coaching career ==
From 2001 through 2019, Harrell had various coaching positions as an assistant coach at Western Carolina, McDowell High School, Fuquay-Varina High School, Franklin High School, Lenoir-Rhyne, The Citadel, and Kennesaw State. On January 28, 2020, Harrell was hired by the East Carolina Pirates as the team's defensive coordinator and linebackers coach. On October 20, 2024, After former East Carolina head coach Mike Houston was fired, Harrell was named the team's interim head coach. Following a 4–0 start, East Carolina made Harrell the permanent head coach.

== Head coaching record ==
Year	Team	Overall	Conference	Standing	Bowl/playoffs
East Carolina Pirates (American Athletic Conference / American Conference) (2024–present)
2024	East Carolina	5–1 (Note: Harrell became interim head coach after Mike Houston's firing following week 7.)	4–1	5th	W Military
2025	East Carolina	9–4	6–2	T–4th	W Military
2026	East Carolina	7–4	5–2		
East Carolina:		21–9	15–5		
Total:		21–9			
