= 2023 Virginia Tech Hokies football team =

American college football season

2023 Virginia Tech Hokies football

Military Bowl champion

Military Bowl, W 41–20 vs. Tulane
- Conference: Atlantic Coast Conference
- Record: 7–6 (5–3 ACC)
- Head coach: Brent Pry (2nd season)
- Offensive coordinator: Tyler Bowen (2nd season)
- Offensive scheme: Multiple
- Defensive coordinator: Chris Marve (2nd season)
- Base defense: 4–3
- Home stadium: Lane Stadium

2023 Atlantic Coast Conference football standings
	Conf.			Overall
Team	W		L	W		L
No. 6 Florida State y$	8	–	0	13	–	1
No. 19 Louisville y	7	–	1	10	–	4
No. 21 NC State	6	–	2	9	–	4
Georgia Tech	5	–	3	7	–	6
Virginia Tech	5	–	3	7	–	6
No. 20 Clemson	4	–	4	9	–	4
Duke	4	–	4	8	–	5
North Carolina	4	–	4	8	–	5
Boston College	3	–	5	7	–	6
Miami (FL)	3	–	5	7	–	6
Syracuse	2	–	6	6	–	7
Pittsburgh	2	–	6	3	–	9
Virginia	2	–	6	3	–	9
Wake Forest	1	–	7	4	–	8
Championship: Florida State 16, Louisville 6
$ – Conference champion; y – Championship game participant; Rankings from AP Poll

The 2023 Virginia Tech Hokies football team represented Virginia Tech as a member of the Atlantic Coast Conference during the 2023 NCAA Division I FBS football season. The Hokies were led by Brent Pry in his second year as Virginia Tech's head coach. They played their home games at Lane Stadium in Blacksburg, Virginia.

The team had a 6–6 regular season record, and defeated Virginia 55–17 in Charlottesville to earn a bid to the 2023 Military Bowl in Annapolis. Tech defeated Tulane 41–20 in that game to finish the season 7–6. The Virginia Tech Hokies football team drew an average home attendance of 64,733 in 2023, the 24th highest in college football.

== Schedule ==
Virginia Tech and the ACC announced the 2023 football schedule on January 30, 2023. The 2023 season will be the conference's first season since 2004 without divisions. The new format matches Virginia Tech with three set conference opponents, while playing the remaining ten teams twice (home and away) in a four–year cycle. The Hokies' three set conference opponents for the next four seasons are Pittsburgh, Virginia, and Wake Forest.

Date	Time	Opponent	Site	TV	Result	Attendance
September 2	8:00 p.m.	Old Dominion*	Lane Stadium; Blacksburg, VA	ACCN	W 36–17	65,632
September 9	12:00 p.m.	Purdue*	Lane Stadium; Blacksburg, VA	ESPN2	L 17–24	65,632
September 16	3:30 p.m.	at Rutgers*	SHI Stadium; Piscataway, NJ	BTN	L 16–35	52,657
September 23	12:00 p.m.	at Marshall*	Joan C. Edwards Stadium; Huntington, WV	ESPN2	L 17–24	31,475
September 30	8:00 p.m.	Pittsburgh	Lane Stadium; Blacksburg, VA	ACCN	W 38–21	65,632
October 7	3:30 p.m.	at No. 5 Florida State	Doak Campbell Stadium; Tallahassee, FL	ABC	L 17–39	79,560
October 14	3:30 p.m.	Wake Forest^{†}	Lane Stadium; Blacksburg, VA	ACCN	W 30–13	65,632
October 26	7:30 p.m.	Syracuse	Lane Stadium; Blacksburg, VA	ESPN	W 38–10	60,236
November 4	3:30 p.m.	at No. 13 Louisville	L&N Stadium; Louisville, KY	ACCN	L 3–34	49,945
November 11	12:00 p.m.	at Boston College	Alumni Stadium; Chestnut Hill, MA (rivalry)	ACCN	W 48–22	33,665
November 18	3:30 p.m.	NC State	Lane Stadium; Blacksburg, VA	ACCN	L 28–35	65,632
November 25	3:30 p.m.	at Virginia	Scott Stadium; Charlottesville, VA (Commonwealth Cup)	ACCN	W 55–17	42,976
December 27	2:00 p.m.	vs. Tulane	Navy–Marine Corps Memorial Stadium; Annapolis, MD (Military Bowl)	ESPN	W 41–20	35,849
*Non-conference game; ^{†}Homecoming; Rankings from AP Poll (and CFP Rankings, after October 31) - Released prior to game; All times are in Eastern time; Source:

== Game summaries ==
=== Old Dominion ===
Quarter	1	2	3	4	Total
Old Dominion	0	10	7	0	17
Virginia Tech	2	14	14	6	36

at Lane Stadium • Blacksburg, VA

- Date: September 2, 2023
- Game time: 8:00 p.m. EDT
- Game weather: clear • Temperature: 79 °F (26 °C)
- Game attendance: 65,632
- Referee: Gary Patterson

Game information

First Quarter

- (4:07) VT – Old Dominion snap through the back of the Endzone for a Safety (VT 2–0)

Second Quarter

- (14:53) VT – Jaylin Lane 20 yd Pass From Grant Wells (John Love Kick) (Drive: 10 plays, 55 yards, 4:07; VT 9–0)
- (9:33) ODU - Dominic Dutton 16 yd Pass From Grant Wilson (Ethan Sanchez Kick) (Drive: 12 plays, 83 yards, 5:14; VT 9-7)
- (2:03) VT - Ali Jennings 10 yd Pass From Grant Wells (John Love Kick) (Drive: 8 plays, 62 yards, 3:12; VT 16-7)
- (0:00) ODU - Ethan Sanchez 28 yd Field Goal (Drive: 12 plays, 64 yards, 2:03; VT 16-10)

Third Quarter

- (9:59) VT – Ali Jennings 6 yd Pass From Grant Wells (John Love Kick) (Drive: 6 plays, 69 yards, 2:19; VT 23–10)
- (5:43) ODU - Keshawn Wicks 5 yd Pass From Grant Wilson (Ethan Sanchez Kick) (Drive: 9 plays, 75 yards, 4:16; VT 23-17)
- (2:09) VT - Grant Wells 1 yd Rush (John Love Kick) (Drive: 8 plays, 65 yards, 3:34; VT 30-17)

Fourth Quarter

- (9:28) VT – John Love 27 yd Field Goal (Drive: 8 plays, 40 yards, 3:43; VT 33–17)
- (5:38) VT - John Love 21 yd Field Goal (Drive: 4 plays, 5 yards, 2:35; VT 36-17)

Statistics	ODU	VT
First downs	19	18
Total yards	295	368
Rush yards	201	109
Passing yards	94	259
Turnovers	3	0
Time of possession	26:20	33:40

Team	Category	Player	Statistics
Old Dominion	Passing	Grant Wilson	13/25, 94 yards, 2 TD
Old Dominion	Rushing	Grant Wilson	19 carries, 81 yards
Old Dominion	Receiving	Ahmarian Granger	3 receptions, 14 yards
Virginia Tech	Passing	Grant Wells	17/29, 251 yards, 3 TD
Virginia Tech	Rushing	Bhayshul Tuten	19 carries, 55 yards
Virginia Tech	Receiving	Ali Jennings	5 receptions, 72 yards, 2 TD

=== Purdue ===
Quarter	1	2	3	4	Total
Purdue	7	10	0	7	24
Virginia Tech	0	17	0	0	17

at Lane Stadium • Blacksburg, VA

- Date: September 9, 2023
- Game time: 12:00 p.m. EDT
- Game weather: rainy • Temperature: 72 °F (22 °C)
- Game attendance: 65,632
- Referee: Riley Johnson

Game information

First Quarter

- (11:26) PUR – Devin Mockobee 15 yd Rush (Ben Freehill Kick) (Drive: 9 plays, 75 yards, 3:34; PUR 7-0)

Second Quarter

- (13:03) PUR – Ben Freehill 43 yd Field Goal (Drive: 10 plays, 42 yards, 4:11; PUR 10–0)
- (12:39) PUR - Tyrone Tracy Jr. 21 yd Rush (Ben Freehill Kick) (Drive: 2 plays, 21 yards, 0:12; PUR 17-0)
- (5:54) VT - Bhayshul Tuten 30 yd Pass From Grant Wells (John Love Kick) (Drive: 7 plays, 67 yards, 2:37; PUR 17-7)
- (2:51) VT - John Love 41 yd Field Goal (Drive: 5 plays, 10 yards, 1:27; PUR 17-10)
- (0:10) VT - Jaylin Lane 2 yd Pass From Grant Wells (John Love Kick) (Drive: 8 plays, 70 yards, 1:09; 17-17)

Fourth Quarter

- (8:00) PUR – Hudson Card 2 yd Rush (Ben Freehill Kick) (Drive: 13 plays, 74 yards, 6:31; PUR 24–17)

Statistics	PUR	VT
First downs	22	19
Total yards	427	286
Rush yards	179	11
Passing yards	248	275
Turnovers	0	2
Time of possession	38:01	21:59

Team	Category	Player	Statistics
Purdue	Passing	Hudson Card	23/34, 248 yards
Purdue	Rushing	Devin Mockobee	21 carries, 95 yards, TD
Purdue	Receiving	Max Klare	8 receptions, 64 yards
Virginia Tech	Passing	Grant Wells	16/33, 243 yards, 2 TD
Virginia Tech	Rushing	Malachi Thomas	6 carries, 18 yards
Virginia Tech	Receiving	Jaylin Lane	5 receptions, 54 yards, TD

=== At Rutgers ===
Quarter	1	2	3	4	Total
Virginia Tech	0	3	7	6	16
Rutgers	7	14	0	14	35

at SHI Stadium • Piscataway, NJ

- Date: September 16, 2023
- Game time: 3:30 p.m. EDT
- Game weather: sunny • Temperature: 76 °F (24 °C)
- Game attendance: 52,657
- Referee: Marcus Woods

Game information

First Quarter

- (14:17) RUT – Kyle Monangai 19 yd Rush (Jai Patel Kick) (Drive: 1 play, 19 yards, 0:08; RUT 7–0)

Second Quarter

- (9:29) VT – John Love 30 yd Field Goal (Drive: 15 plays, 57 yards, 6:20; RUT 7–3)
- (7:50) RUT - Gavin Wimsatt 34 yd Rush (Jai Patel Kick) (Drive: 4 plays, 75 yards, 1:39; RUT 14-3)
- (0:04) RUT - Christian Dremel 4 yd Pass From Gavin Wimsatt (Jai Patel Kick) (Drive: 8 plays, 50 yards, 2:19; RUT 21-3)

Third Quarter

- (3:39) VT - Da'Quan Felton 39 yd Pass From Kyron Drones (John Love Kick) (Drive: 6 plays, 77 yards, 2:03; RUT 21-10)

Fourth Quarter

- (14:18) VT - Bhayshul Tuten 1 yd Rush (Drive: 7 plays, 45 yards, 3:22; RUT 21-16)
- (10:41) RUT - Kyle Monangai 55 yd Rush (Jai Patel Kick) (Drive: 6 plays, 75 yards, 3:37; RUT 28-16)
- (3:20) RUT - Kyle Monangai 12 yd Rush (Jai Patel Kick) (Drive: 5 plays, 46 yards, 3:27; RUT 35-16)

Statistics	VT	RUT
First downs	18	14
Total yards	319	302
Rush yards	129	256
Passing yards	190	46
Turnovers	2	0
Time of possession	33:44	26:16

Team	Category	Player	Statistics
Virginia Tech	Passing	Kyron Drones	19/32, 190 yards, TD
Virginia Tech	Rushing	Kyron Drones	22 carries, 74 yards
Virginia Tech	Receiving	Da'Quan Felton	6 receptions, 84 yards, TD
Rutgers	Passing	Gavin Wimsatt	7/16, 46 yards, 1 TD
Rutgers	Rushing	Kyle Monangai	16 carries, 143 yards, 3 TD
Rutgers	Receiving	Christian Dremel	3 receptions, 34 yards, TD

=== At Marshall ===
Quarter	1	2	3	4	Total
Virginia Tech	7	3	0	7	17
Marshall	0	17	7	0	24

at Joan C. Edwards Stadium • Huntington, WV

- Date: September 23, 2023
- Game time: 12:00 p.m. EDT
- Game weather: sunny • Temperature: 76 °F (24 °C)
- Game attendance: 31,475
- Referee: Ted Pitts
- TV announcers (ESPN2): Roy Philpott (play-by-play), Roddy Jones (analyst), Taylor McGregor (sideline)

Game information

First Quarter

- (11:59) VT – Kyron Drones 31 yd Rush (John Love Kick) (Drive: 6 plays, 75 yards, 3:01; VT 7–0)

Second Quarter

- (14:59) MRSH – DeMarcus Harris 12 yd Pass From Cam Fancher (Rece Verhoff Kick) (Drive: 9 plays, 78 yards, 3:27; 7–7)
- (11:47) VT - John Love 21 yd Field Goal (Drive: 8 plays, 70 yards, 2:58; VT 10-7)
- (9:10) MRSH - Rasheen Ali 56 yd Rush (Rece Verhoff Kick) (Drive: 6 plays, 75 yards, 2:37; MRSH 14-10)
- (2:55) MRSH - Rece Verhoff 21 yd Field Goal (Drive: 11 plays, 41 yards, 5:34; MRSH 17-10)

Third Quarter

- (7:22) MRSH - Rasheen Ali 1 yd Rush (Rece Verhoff Kick) (Drive: 7 plays, 98 yards, 3:32; MRSH 24-10)

Fourth Quarter

- (7:14) VT - Kyron Drones 16 yd Rush (John Love Kick) (Drive: 7 plays, 65 yards, 3:24; MRSH 24-17)

Statistics	VT	MRSH
First downs	16	19
Total yards	344	380
Rush yards	184	214
Passing yards	160	166
Turnovers	1	2
Time of possession	27:14	32:46

Team	Category	Player	Statistics
Virginia Tech	Passing	Kyron Drones	19/35, 160 yards
Virginia Tech	Rushing	Bhayshul Tuten	9 carries, 88 yards
Virginia Tech	Receiving	Benji Gosnell	4 receptions, 52 yards
Marshall	Passing	Cam Fancher	16/27, 166 yards, TD
Marshall	Rushing	Rasheen Ali	27 carries, 174 yards, 2 TD
Marshall	Receiving	Caleb Coombs	4 receptions, 41 yards

=== Pitt ===
Quarter	1	2	3	4	Total
Pitt	7	0	14	0	21
Virginia Tech	7	14	14	3	38

at Lane Stadium • Blacksburg, VA

- Date: September 30, 2023
- Game time: 8:00 p.m. EDT
- Game weather: clear • Temperature: 69 °F (21 °C)
- Game attendance: 65,632
- Referee: Tim Hedgepeth

Game information

First Quarter

- (10:51) VT – Da'Quan Felton 54 yd Pass From Kyron Drones (John Love Kick) (Drive: 5 plays, 65 yards, 2:14; VT 7-0)
- (10:39) PITT - Bub Means 75 yd Pass From Phil Jurkovec (Ben Sauls Kick) (Drive: 1 play, 75 yards, 0:12; 7-7)

Second Quarter

- (13:07) VT – Kyron Drones 2 yd Rush (John Love Kick) (Drive: 11 plays, 55 yards, 4:27; VT 14–7)
- (0:21) VT - Bhayshul Tuten 12 yd Pass From Kyron Drones (John Love Kick) (Drive: 11 plays, 67 yards, 4:09; VT 21-7)

Third Quarter

- (10:29) VT - Kyron Drones 10 yd Rush (John Love Kick) (Drive: 3 plays, 10 yards, 1:19; VT 28-7)
- (10:08) PITT - C'Bo Flemister 61 yd Pass From Phil Jurkovec (Ben Sauls Kick) (Drive: 1 play, 61 yards, 0:14; VT 28-14)
- (9:31) PITT - Braylan Lovelace 4 yd Fumble Return (Ben Sauls Kick) (VT 28-21)
- (3:27) VT - Jaylin Lane 53 yd Pass From Kyron Drones (John Love Kick) (Drive: 2 plays, 52 yards, 0:43; VT 35-21)

Fourth Quarter

- (6:06) VT – John Love 32 yd Field Goal (Drive: 14 plays, 77 yards, 8:54; VT 38–21)

Statistics	PITT	VT
First downs	9	25
Total yards	273	427
Rush yards	38	199
Passing yards	235	228
Turnovers	1	1
Time of possession	22:16	37:44

Team	Category	Player	Statistics
Pitt	Passing	Phil Jurkovec	11/22, 235 yards, 2 TD
Pitt	Rushing	C'Bo Flemister	10 carries, 41 yards
Pitt	Receiving	Konata Mumpfield	4 receptions, 57 yards
Virginia Tech	Passing	Kyron Drones	12/19, 228 yards, 3 TD
Virginia Tech	Rushing	Bhayshul Tuten	24 carries, 109 yards
Virginia Tech	Receiving	Da'Quan Felton	4 receptions, 81 yards, TD

=== At No. 5 Florida State ===
Quarter	1	2	3	4	Total
Virginia Tech	0	10	7	0	17
No. 5 Florida State	22	0	10	7	39

at Doak Campbell Stadium • Tallahassee, FL

- Date: October 7, 2023
- Game time: 3:30 p.m. EDT
- Game weather: sunny • Temperature: 83 °F (28 °C)
- Game attendance: 79,560
- Referee: Mike Roche

Game information

First Quarter

- (9:13) FSU – Johnny Wilson 7 yd Pass From Jordan Travis (Brian Courtney Rush) (Drive: 13 plays, 75 yards, 5:47; FSU 8–0)
- (4:44) FSU - Lawrance Toafili 28 yd Rush (Ryan Fitzgerald Kick) (Drive: 7 plays, 66 yards, 2:58; FSU 15-0)
- (1:34) FSU - Johnny Wilson 18 yd Pass From Jordan Travis (Ryan Fitzgerald Kick) (Drive: 7 plays, 45 yards, 2:16; FSU 22-0)

Second Quarter

- (9:37) VT – John Love 29 yd Field Goal (Drive: 8 plays, 76 yards, 4:02; FSU 22–7)
- (0:46) VT - Bhayshul Tuten 5 yd Rush (John Love Kick) (Drive: 16 plays, 70 yards, 6:55; FSU 22-10)

Third Quarter

- (14:47) VT - Bhayshul Tuten 99 yd Kickoff Return (John Love Kick) (FSU 22-17)
- (14:19) FSU - Trey Benson 62 yd Rush (Ryan Fitzgerald Kick) (Drive: 2 plays, 75 yards, 0:28; FSU 29-17)
- (6:23) FSU - Ryan Fitzgerald 26 yd Field Goal (Drive: 11 plays, 71 yards, 5:36; FSU 32-17)

Fourth Quarter

- (8:28) FSU - Trey Benson 85 yd Rush (Ryan Fitzgerald Kick) (Drive: 1 play, 85 yards, 0:11; FSU 39-17)

Statistics	VT	FSU
First downs	19	20
Total yards	313	452
Rush yards	209	282
Passing yards	104	170
Turnovers	1	0
Time of possession	31:16	28:44

Team	Category	Player	Statistics
Virginia Tech	Passing	Kyron Drones	14/27, 104 yards
Virginia Tech	Rushing	Kyron Drones	14 carries, 80 yards
Virginia Tech	Receiving	Jaylin Lane	6 receptions, 51 yards
No. 5 Florida State	Passing	Jordan Travis	18/24, 170 yards, 2 TD
No. 5 Florida State	Rushing	Trey Benson	11 carries, 200 yards, 2 TD
No. 5 Florida State	Receiving	Johnny Wilson	4 receptions, 54 yards, 2 TD

=== Wake Forest ===
Quarter	1	2	3	4	Total
Wake Forest	0	10	0	3	13
Virginia Tech	0	17	3	10	30

at Lane Stadium • Blacksburg, VA

- Date: October 14, 2023
- Game time: 3:30 p.m. EDT
- Game weather: sunny • Temperature: 66 °F (19 °C)
- Game attendance: 65,632
- Referee: Stuart Mullins

Game information

Second Quarter

- (10:42) VT – Bhayshul Tuten 3 yd Rush (John Love Kick) (Drive: 4 plays, 51 yards, 1:48; VT 7–0)
- (4:23) VT - John Love 37 yd Field Goal (Drive: 9 plays, 55 yards, 4:31; VT 10-0)
- (4:10) WF - Demond Claiborne 96 yd Kickoff Return (Matthew Dennis Kick) (VT 10-7)
- (3:59) VT - Jaylin Lane 75 yd Pass From Kyron Drones (John Love Kick) (Drive: 1 play, 75 yards, 0:11; VT 17-7)
- (0:20) WF - Matthew Dennis 28 yd Field Goal (Drive: 10 plays, 55 yards, 3:39; VT 17-10)

Third Quarter

- (0:49) VT - John Love 26 yd Field Goal (Drive: 13 plays, 45 yards, 6:26; VT 20-10)

Fourth Quarter

- (12:37) WF – Matthew Dennis 34 yd Field Goal (Drive: 8 plays, 60 yards, 3:12; VT 20–13)
- (8:06) VT - John Love 36 yd Field Goal (Drive: 8 plays, 56 yards, 4:31; VT 23-13)
- (2:47) VT - Jaylin Lane 12 yd Pass From Kyron Drones (John Love Kick) (Drive: 7 plays, 53 yards, 3:07; VT 30-13)

Statistics	WF	VT
First downs	20	21
Total yards	262	462
Rush yards	35	141
Passing yards	227	321
Turnovers	3	1
Time of possession	27:08	32:52

Team	Category	Player	Statistics
Wake Forest	Passing	Michael Kern	14/22, 166 yards
Wake Forest	Rushing	Justice Ellison	11 carries, 35 yards
Wake Forest	Receiving	Taylor Morin	7 receptions, 86 yards
Virginia Tech	Passing	Kyron Drones	20/29, 321 yards, 2 TD
Virginia Tech	Rushing	Kyron Drones	15 carries, 59 yards
Virginia Tech	Receiving	Jaylin Lane	3 receptions, 102 yards, 2 TD

=== Syracuse ===
Quarter	1	2	3	4	Total
Syracuse	0	3	7	0	10
Virginia Tech	13	17	5	3	38

at Lane Stadium • Blacksburg, VA

- Date: October 26, 2023
- Game time: 7:30 p.m. EDT
- Game weather: clear • Temperature: 67 °F (19 °C)
- Game attendance: 60,232
- Referee: Riley Johnson

Game information

First Quarter

- (11:22) VT - John Love 43 yd Field Goal (Drive: 7 plays, 25 yards, 2:28; VT 3-0)
- (6:00) VT - Da'Quan Felton 16 yd Pass From Malachi Thomas (John Love Kick) (Drive: 10 plays, 68 yards, 4:16; VT 10-0)
- (1:57) VT - John Love 32 yd Field Goal (Drive: 6 plays, 15 yards, 2:34; VT 13-0)

Second Quarter

- (11:34) VT – John Love 39 yd Field Goal (Drive: 9 plays, 53 yards, 3:56; VT 16–0)
- (7:13) VT - Da'Quan Felton 62 yd Pass From Kyron Drones (John Love Kick) (Drive: 6 plays, 93 yards, 2:27; VT 23-0)
- (4:18) SYR - Brady Denaburg 43 yd Field Goal (Drive: 8 plays, 50 yards, 2:55; VT 23-3)
- (1:34) VT - Bhayshul Tuten 3 yd Rush (John Love Kick) (Drive: 6 plays, 75 yards, 2:44; VT 30-3)

Third Quarter

- (12:57) VT - Garrett Shrader (SYR) Strip Sacked, Fumble through the back of the Endzone for a Safety (VT 32-3)
- (7:41) SYR - Dan Villari 6 yd Pass From Garrett Shrader (Brady Denaburg Kick) (Drive: 9 plays, 80 yards, 3:23; VT 32-10)
- (0:08) VT - John Love 24 yd Field Goal (Drive: 12 plays, 68 yards, 7:33; VT 35-10)

Fourth Quarter

- (7:47) VT - John Love 31 yd Field Goal (Drive: 9 plays, 52 yards, 5:49; VT 38-10)

Statistics	SYR	VT
First downs	9	28
Total yards	137	528
Rush yards	0	318
Passing yards	137	210
Turnovers	0	0
Time of possession	18:18	41:42

Team	Category	Player	Statistics
Syracuse	Passing	Garrett Shrader	12/18, 137 yards, TD
Syracuse	Rushing	LeQuint Allen	14 carries, 42 yards
Syracuse	Receiving	Damien Alford	4 receptions, 70 yards
Virginia Tech	Passing	Kyron Drones	15/24, 194 yards, TD
Virginia Tech	Rushing	Bhayshul Tuten	18 carries, 118 yards, TD
Virginia Tech	Receiving	Da'Quan Felton	3 receptions, 80 yards, 2 TD

=== At No. 15 Louisville ===
Quarter	1	2	3	4	Total
Virginia Tech	0	3	0	0	3
No. 15 Louisville	7	7	13	7	34

at L&N Stadium • Louisville, KY

- Date: November 4, 2023
- Game time: 3:30 p.m. EDT
- Game weather: Cloudy • Temperature: 66 °F (19 °C) • Wind: 9 mph SW
- Game attendance: 49,945
- Referee: Tim Hedgepeth
- TV announcers (ACCN): Chris Cotter (play-by-play), Mark Herzlich (analyst), Ashley Stroehlein (sideline)

Game information

First Quarter

- (6:53) LOU – Jawhar Jordan 1 yd Rush (Brock Travelstead Kick) (Drive: 9 plays, 49 yards, 5:45; LOU 7–0)

Second Quarter

- (14:52) LOU – Isaac Guerendo 39 yd Rush (Brock Travelstead Kick) (Drive: 6 plays, 88 yards, 2:50; LOU 14–0)
- (0:00) VT - John Love 44 yd Field Goal (Drive: 12 plays, 53 yards, 6:03; LOU 14-3)

Third Quarter

- (9:38) LOU - Jadon Thompson 37 yd Pass From Jack Plummer (Brock Travelstead Kick) (Drive: 5 plays, 63 yards, 2:17; LOU 21-3)
- (6:58) LOU - Isaac Guerendo 12 yd Rush (Drive: 3 plays, 35 yards, 1:23; LOU 27-3)

Fourth Quarter

- (8:16) LOU - Isaac Guerendo 36 yd Rush (Brock Travelstead Kick) (Drive: 2 plays, 44 yards, 0:50; LOU 34-3)

Statistics	VT	LOU
First downs	12	17
Total yards	140	382
Rush yards	68	231
Passing yards	72	151
Turnovers	1	0
Time of possession	27:45	32:15

Team	Category	Player	Statistics
Virginia Tech	Passing	Kyron Drones	12/21, 69 yards
Virginia Tech	Rushing	Bhayshul Tuten	11 carries, 57 yards
Virginia Tech	Receiving	Da'Quan Felton	4 receptions, 34 yards
No. 15 Louisville	Passing	Jack Plummer	11/12, 141 yards, TD
No. 15 Louisville	Rushing	Isaac Guerendo	11 carries, 146 yards, 3 TD
No. 15 Louisville	Receiving	Jadon Thompson	2 receptions, 49 yards, TD

=== At Boston College ===
Quarter	1	2	3	4	Total
Virginia Tech	10	21	7	10	48
Boston College	7	0	8	7	22

at Alumni Stadium • Chestnut Hill, MA

- Date: November 11, 2023
- Game time: 12:00 p.m. EDT
- Game weather: sunny • Temperature: 56 °F (13 °C)
- Game attendance: 33,665
- Referee: Mike Roche

Game information

First Quarter

- (12:40) VT – John Love 27 yd Field Goal (Drive: 6 plays, 27 yards, 2:07; VT 3–0)
- (9:00) BC - Alex Broome 4 yd Rush (Liam Connor Kick) (Drive: 8 plays, 65 yards, 3:40; BC 7-3)
- (1:28) VT - Bhayshul Tuten 7 yd Rush (John Love Kick) (Drive: 11 plays, 69 yards, 6:14; VT 10-7)

Second Quarter

- (13:07) VT – Stephen Gosnell 22 yd Pass From Kyron Drones (John Love Kick) (Drive: 7 plays, 51 yards, 3:19; VT 17–7)
- (7:04) VT - Jaylin Lane 5 yd Pass From Kyron Drones (John Love Kick) (Drive: 4 plays, 75 yards, 1:50; VT 24-7)
- (1:33) VT - Bhayshul Tuten 4 yd Rush (John Love Kick) (Drive: 5 plays, 83 yards, 2:14; VT 31-7)

Third Quarter

- (8:50) VT - Bhayshul Tuten 4 yd Rush (John Love Kick) (Drive: 10 plays, 76 yards, 6:04; VT 38-7)
- (2:52) BC - Jaedn Skeete 8 yd Pass From Thomas Castellanos (Lewis Bond Pass) (Drive: 13 plays, 65 yards, 5:58; VT 38-15)

Fourth Quarter

- (14:53) VT - Malachi Thomas 35 yd Rush (John Love Kick) (Drive: 6 plays, 49 yards, 2:57; VT 45-15)
- (10:54) VT - John Love 46 yd Field Goal (Drive: 7 plays, 22 yards, 3:33; VT 48-15)
- (4:26) BC - Xavier Coleman 1 yd Rush (Liam Connor Kick) (Drive: 6 plays, 37 yards, 3:13; VT 48-22)

Statistics	VT	BC
First downs	24	14
Total yards	600	262
Rush yards	361	124
Passing yards	239	138
Turnovers	2	2
Time of possession	35:59	24:01

Team	Category	Player	Statistics
Virginia Tech	Passing	Kyron Drones	12/17, 219 yards, 2 TD
Virginia Tech	Rushing	Kyron Drones	20 carries, 135 yards
Virginia Tech	Receiving	Da'Quan Felton	4 receptions, 101 yards
Boston College	Passing	Thomas Castellanos	10/20, 110 yards, TD
Boston College	Rushing	Alex Broome	9 carries, 56 yards, TD
Boston College	Receiving	Jeremiah Franklin	3 receptions, 52 yards

=== NC State ===
Quarter	1	2	3	4	Total
NC State	0	21	14	0	35
Virginia Tech	0	7	7	14	28

at Lane Stadium • Blacksburg, VA

- Date: November 18, 2023
- Game time: 3:30 p.m. EDT
- Game weather: sunny • Temperature: 53 °F (12 °C)
- Game attendance: 65,632
- Referee: Jeff Heaser
- TV announcers (ACCN): Chris Cotter (play-by-play), Mark Herzlich (analyst) and Sherree Burruss (sideline)

Game information

Second Quarter

- (12:04) NCST – Kevin "KC" Concepcion 3 yd Pass From Brennan Armstrong (Brayden Narveson Kick) (Drive: 7 plays, 64 yards, 4:05; NCST 7–0)
- (4:46) NCST - Brennan Armstrong 1 yd Rush (Brayden Narveson Kick) (Drive: 8 plays, 60 yards, 4:49; NCST 14-0)
- (4:26) VT - Xayvion Turner-Bradshaw 47 yd Rush (John Love Kick) (Drive: 1 play, 47 yards, 0:11; NCST 14-7)
- (0:18) NCST - Kevin "KC" Concepcion 28 yd Pass From Brennan Armstrong (Brayden Narveson Kick) (Drive: 11 plays, 75 yards, 4:08; NCST 21-7)

Third Quarter

- (9:03) NCST - Brennan Armstrong 1 yd Rush (Brayden Narveson Kick) (Drive: 12 plays, 75 yards, 5:57; NCST 28-7)
- (8:10) VT - Da'Quan Felton 42 yd Pass From Kyron Drones (John Love Kick) (Drive: 2 plays, 76 yards, 0:46; NCST 28-14)
- (5:53) NCST - Trent Pennix 17 yd Pass From Kevin "KC" Concepcion (Brayden Narveson Kick) (Drive: 4 plays, 75 yards, 2:17; NCST 35-14)

Fourth Quarter

- (7:03) VT - Da'Quan Felton 12 yd Pass From Kyron Drones (John Love Kick) (Drive: 10 plays, 92 yards, 3:49; NCST 35-21)
- (1:40) VT - Stephen Gosnell 13 yd Pass From Kyron Drones (John Love Kick) (Drive: 4 plays, 56 yards, 1:11; NCST 35-28)

Statistics	NCST	VT
First downs	24	17
Total yards	408	349
Rush yards	188	124
Passing yards	220	225
Turnovers	0	1
Time of possession	40:37	19:23

Team	Category	Player	Statistics
NC State	Passing	Brennan Armstrong	18/26, 203 yards, 2 TD
NC State	Rushing	Brennan Armstrong	21 carries, 89 yards, 2 TD
NC State	Receiving	Kevin "KC" Concepcion	7 receptions, 62 yards, 2 TD
Virginia Tech	Passing	Kyron Drones	17/30, 225 yards, 3 TD
Virginia Tech	Rushing	Kyron Drones	9 carries, 51 yards
Virginia Tech	Receiving	Da'Quan Felton	7 receptions, 87 yards, 2 TD

=== At Virginia ===
Quarter	1	2	3	4	Total
Virginia Tech	10	14	24	7	55
Virginia	0	0	10	7	17

at Scott Stadium • Charlottesville, VA

- Date: November 25, 2023
- Game time: 3:30 p.m. EDT
- Game weather: sunny • Temperature: 43 °F (6 °C)
- Game attendance: 42,976
- Referee: Gary Patterson

Game information

First Quarter

- (9:58) VT – John Love 41 yd Field Goal (Drive: 11 plays, 52 yards, 5:02; VT 3–0)
- (3:21) VT - Stephen Gosnell 44 yd Pass From Kyron Drones (John Love Kick) (Drive: 6 plays, 64 yards, 2:24; VT 10-0)

Second Quarter

- (13:53) VT – Tucker Holloway 33 yd Rush (John Love Kick) (Drive: 5 plays, 79 yards, 2:32; VT 17–0)
- (5:30) VT - Bhayshul Tuten 32 yd Rush (John Love Kick) (Drive: 5 plays, 55 yards, 2:16; VT 24-0)

Third Quarter

- (11:12) VT - Da'Quan Felton 84 yd Pass From Kyron Drones (John Love Kick) (Drive: 1 play, 84 yards, 0:15; VT 31-0)
- (7:44) UVA - Will Bettridge 25 yd Field Goal (Drive: 9 plays, 68 yards, 3:28; VT 31-3)
- (7:28) VT - Bhayshul Tuten 94 yd Kickoff Return (John Love Kick) (VT 38-3)
- (6:07) UVA - Malachi Fields 38 yd Pass From Anthony Colandrea (Will Bettridge Kick) (Drive: 3 plays, 47 yards, 1:21; VT 38-10)
- (4:34) VT - John Love 47 yd Field Goal (Drive: 5 plays, 46 yards, 1:33; VT 41-10)
- (0:18) VT - Da'Quan Felton 34 yd Pass From Kyron Drones (John Love Kick) (Drive: 3 plays, 33 yards, 1:03; VT 48-10)

Fourth Quarter

- (9:18) UVA - Malachi Fields 3 yd Pass From Anthony Colandrea (Will Bettridge Kick) (Drive: 11 plays, 78 yards, 3:28; VT 48-17)
- (3:53) VT - Malachi Thomas 7 yd Rush (John Love Kick) (Drive: 8 plays, 43 yards, 5:25; VT 55-17)

Statistics	VT	UVA
First downs	16	18
Total yards	500	286
Rush yards	252	43
Passing yards	248	243
Turnovers	1	2
Time of possession	28:46	31:14

Team	Category	Player	Statistics
Virginia Tech	Passing	Kyron Drones	10/22, 244 yards, 3 TD
Virginia Tech	Rushing	Bhayshul Tuten	16 carries, 117 yards, TD
Virginia Tech	Receiving	Da'Quan Felton	3 receptions, 133 yards, 2 TD
Virginia	Passing	Anthony Colandrea	29/46, 243 yards, 2 TD
Virginia	Rushing	Donte Hawthorne	4 carries, 16 yards
Virginia	Receiving	Malik Washington	14 receptions, 115 yards

=== No. 23 Tulane (Military Bowl) ===
Quarter	1	2	3	4	Total
Virginia Tech	10	7	10	14	41
No. 23 Tulane	7	3	7	3	20

at Navy-Marine Corps Memorial Stadium • Annapolis, MD

- Date: December 27, 2023
- Game time: 2:00 p.m. EDT
- Game weather: rainy • Temperature: 54 °F (12 °C)
- Game attendance: 35,848
- Referee: Trennis Livingston

Game information

First Quarter

- (12:01) TULA – Tyler Grubbs 21 yd Fumble Return (Valentino Ambrosio Kick) (TULA 7–0)
- (5:33) VT - John Love 35 yd Field Goal (Drive: 14 plays, 57 yards, 6:28; TULA 7-3)
- (2:20) VT - Kyron Drones 11 yd Rush (John Love Kick) (Drive: 1 play, 11 yards, 0:09; VT 10-7)

Second Quarter

- (4:40) TULA – Valentino Ambrosio 49 yd Field Goal (Drive: 7 plays, 23 yards, 3:58; 10–10)
- (0:08) VT - Harrison Saint Germain 1 yd Pass From Kyron Drones (John Love Kick) (Drive: 11 plays, 75 yards, 4:32; VT 17-10)

Third Quarter

- (12:52) TULA - Kai Horton 6 yd Rush (Valentino Ambrosio Kick) (Drive: 3 plays, 17 yards, 1:23; 17-17)
- (10:31) VT - Bhayshul Tuten 9 yd Rush (John Love Kick) (Drive: 5 plays, 73 yards, 2:21; VT 24-17)
- (5:28) VT - John Love 35 yd Field Goal (Drive: 6 plays, 58 yards, 3:01; VT 27-17)

Fourth Quarter

- (14:56) TULA - Valentino Ambrosio 20 yd Field Goal (Drive: 11 plays, 73 yards, 5:32; VT 27-20)
- (12:38) VT - Benji Gosnell 10 yd Pass From Kyron Drones (John Love Kick) (Drive: 5 plays, 75 yards, 2:18; VT 34-20)
- (9:33) VT - Bhayshul Tuten 12 yd Rush (John Love Kick) (Drive: 6 plays, 44 yards, 2:32; VT 41-20)

Statistics	VT	TULA
First downs	25	15
Total yards	453	252
Rush yards	362	133
Passing yards	91	119
Turnovers	2	3
Time of possession	33:06	26:54

Team	Category	Player	Statistics
Virginia Tech	Passing	Kyron Drones	13/21, 91 yards, 2 TD
Virginia Tech	Rushing	Kyron Drones	20 carries, 176 yards, TD
Virginia Tech	Receiving	Benji Gosnell	2 receptions, 21 yards, TD
Tulane	Passing	Kai Horton	13/20, 119 yards, 2 TD
Tulane	Rushing	Makhi Hughes	15 carries, 88 yards
Tulane	Receiving	Malik Washington	5 receptions, 63 yards
