= 2023 Military Bowl =

Postseason college football bowl game

2023 Military Bowl presented by GoBowling.com
- 14th Military Bowl
Virginia Tech Hokies	Tulane Green Wave
(6–6)	(11–2)
ACC	The American
41	20
Head coach: Brent Pry	Head coach: Slade Nagle (interim)
	AP / Coaches / CFP; 23 / 24 / NR
	1	2	3	4	Total
Virginia Tech	10	7	10	14	41
Tulane	7	3	7	3	20
- Date: December 27, 2023
- Season: 2023
- Stadium: Navy–Marine Corps Memorial Stadium
- Location: Annapolis, Maryland
- MVP: Kyron Drones (QB, Virginia Tech)
- Favorite: Virginia Tech by 7.5
- Referee: Trennis Livingston (Sun Belt)
- Attendance: 35,849

United States TV coverage
- Network: ESPN
- Announcers: Jay Alter (play-by-play), Rene Ingoglia (analyst), and Alex Chappell (sideline)

The 2023 Military Bowl was a college football bowl game played on December 27, 2023, at Navy–Marine Corps Memorial Stadium in Annapolis, Maryland. The 14th annual Military Bowl featured Tulane from the American Athletic Conference (The American) and Virginia Tech from the Atlantic Coast Conference (ACC). The game began at approximately 2:00 p.m. EST and was aired on ESPN. The Military Bowl was one of the 2023–24 bowl games concluding the 2023 FBS football season. The game was sponsored by bowling consumer website GoBowling.com and was officially known as the Military Bowl presented by GoBowling.com.

== Teams ==
The game featured the Virginia Tech Hokies of the Atlantic Coast Conference (ACC) and the Tulane Green Wave of the American Athletic Conference (The American).

This was the 10th meeting between Virginia Tech and Tulane; entering the game, the Hokies led the Green Wave in their all-time series, 5–4.

=== Virginia Tech Hokies ===
The Hokies entered the game with a 6–6 record (5–3 in the ACC), tied for fourth place in their conference.

This was Virginia Tech's third Military Bowl, tying Navy and Temple for the most appearances in the game. The Hokies previously won the 2014 edition and lost the 2018 edition.

=== Tulane Green Wave ===
The Green Wave entered the game ranked 23rd in the AP poll, with an 11–2 record (8–0 in The American). Hosting the 2023 American Athletic Conference Football Championship Game, the Green Wave lost to SMU, 26–14.

This was Tulane's first Military Bowl.

== Game summary ==
2023 Military Bowl presented by GoBowling.com

Quarter	1	2	3	4	Total
Virginia Tech	10	7	10	14	41
Tulane	7	3	7	3	20

at Navy–Marine Corps Memorial Stadium • Annapolis, Maryland

- Date: Wednesday, December 27, 2023
- Game time: 2:00 p.m. EST
- Game weather: Rain • Temperature: 54 °F (12 °C) • Wind: 10 mph (16 km/h) W
- Game attendance: 35,849
- Referee: Trennis Livingston
- TV announcers (ESPN): Jay Alter (play-by-play), Rene Ingoglia (analyst), and Alex Chappell (sideline)
- Box score

Scoring summary

Quarter	Time	Drive			Team	Scoring information	Score	
Quarter	Time	Plays	Yards	TOP	Team	Scoring information	VT	TUL
1	12:01	6	1	1:55	TUL	Tyler Grubbs (TUL) 21 Yd Fumble Return	0	7
1	5:33	14	57	6:28	VT	35-yard field goal by John Love	3	7
1	2:20	1	11	0:09	VT	Kyron Drones 11-yard touchdown run, John Love kick good	10	7
2	5:33	7	23	3:58	TUL	49-yard field goal by Valentino Ambrosio	10	10
2	0:09	11	75	4:32	VT	Harrison Saint Germain 1-yard touchdown reception from Kyron Drones, John Love kick good	17	10
3	12:52	3	17	1:23	TUL	Kai Horton 6-yard touchdown run, Valentino Ambrosio kick good	17	17
3	10:31	5	73	2:21	VT	Bhayshul Tuten 9-yard touchdown run, John Love kick good	24	17
3	5:28	6	58	3:01	VT	35-yard field goal by John Love	27	17
4	14:56	11	73	5:32	TUL	20-yard field goal by Valentino Ambrosio	27	20
4	12:38	5	75	2:18	VT	Benji Gosnell 10-yard touchdown reception from Kyron Drones, John Love kick good	34	20
4	9:33	6	44	2:32	VT	Bhayshul Tuten 12-yard touchdown run, John Love kick good	41	20
"TOP" = time of possession. For other American football terms, see Glossary of American football.							41	20

=== Statistics ===
Statistics	VT	TUL
First downs	24	15
Plays–yards	71–453	54–252
Rushes–yards	50–362	33–133
Passing yards	91	119
Passing: comp–att–int	13–21–0	13–21–0
Time of possession	33:09	26:51

Team	Category	Player	Statistics
Virginia Tech	Passing	Kyron Drones	13/21, 91 yards, 2 TD
Virginia Tech	Rushing	Kyron Drones	20 carries, 176 yards, TD
Virginia Tech	Receiving	Benji Gosnell	2 receptions, 21 yards, TD
Tulane	Passing	Kai Horton	13/20, 119 yards
Tulane	Rushing	Makhi Hughes	15 carries, 88 yards
Tulane	Receiving	Yulkeith Brown	63 yards
