= 2023 Tulane Green Wave football team =

American college football season

2023 Tulane Green Wave football

AAC Championship Game, L 14–26 vs. SMU

Military Bowl, L 20–41 vs. Virginia Tech
- Conference: American Athletic Conference
- Record: 11–3 (8–0 AAC)
- Head coach: Willie Fritz (8th season; regular season); Slade Nagle (interim; bowl game)
- Offensive coordinator: Slade Nagle (1st season)
- Offensive scheme: West Coast
- Defensive coordinator: Shiel Wood (1st season)
- Base defense: 3–4
- Home stadium: Yulman Stadium

2023 American Athletic Conference football standings
	Conf.			Overall
Team	W		L	W		L
No. 22 SMU y$	8	–	0	11	–	3
Tulane y	8	–	0	11	–	3
UTSA	7	–	1	9	–	4
Memphis	6	–	2	10	–	3
South Florida	4	–	4	7	–	6
Rice	4	–	4	6	–	7
Navy	4	–	4	5	–	7
North Texas	3	–	5	5	–	7
UAB	3	–	5	4	–	8
Florida Atlantic	3	–	5	4	–	8
Charlotte	2	–	6	3	–	9
Tulsa	2	–	6	4	–	8
Temple	1	–	7	3	–	9
East Carolina	1	–	7	2	–	10
Championship: SMU 26, Tulane 14
$ – Conference champion; y – Championship game participant; Rankings from AP Poll

The 2023 Tulane Green Wave football team represented Tulane University in the American Athletic Conference (AAC) during the 2023 NCAA Division I FBS football season. The Green Wave were led by Willie Fritz in his eighth and final year as head coach. They played their home games at Yulman Stadium in New Orleans, Louisiana. They entered this season as the defending AAC champions.

On December 3, Fritz was hired as the head coach for the Houston Cougars. Offensive coordinator Slade Nagle was named interim coach for the Military Bowl. On December 9, Troy head coach Jon Sumrall was named as the Green Wave's new head coach.

The Tulane Green Wave football team drew an average home attendance of 25,021 in 2023.

== Offseason ==
Jim Svoboda, Tulane's former offensive coordinator, parted ways with the team after one season. To replace him, Willie Fritz promoted seventh-year tight ends coach Slade Nagle to offensive coordinator, now Tulane's fourth offensive coordinator in as many years.

Chris Hampton, Tulane's former defensive coordinator, was hired by Oregon as a co-defensive coordinator. Lance Guidry was hired as his replacement on January 20, 2023, although Guidry left the job 18 days later for the same position at Miami. On February 16, Tulane announced their new defensive coordinator to be Shiel Wood, the former defensive coordinator at Troy.

Tulane would lose some outgoing players to the National Football League draft in the offseason: Tyjae Spears and Dorian Williams were both drafted in the third round of the 2023 NFL draft. Nick Anderson, Larry Brooks, Macon Clark, Tyrick James, Will Wallace, Duece Watts, Shae Wyatt, and Lummie Young IV were all signed to the NFL as undrafted free agents as well. However, co-captains Michael Pratt and Sincere Haynesworth announced they would return to Tulane for the 2023 season.

=== Transfers ===
==== Outgoing ====
Player	Position	Destination
Ygenio Booker	RB	UT Martin
Deajaun McDougle	WR	Unknown
Kanyon Walker	CB	Murray State
Hutson Lillibridge	OL	Missouri State
Cameron Carroll	RB	Florida
Carlos Hatcher	EDGE	Coastal Carolina
Armoni Dixon	LB	Unknown
Kriston Esnard	K	UCF
Keanon McNally	OT	Old Dominion
Cadien Robinson	CB	Unknown
Jadon Canady	CB	Ole Miss
Andre' Sam	S	LSU
TJ Huggins	CB	Florida A&M
Joseph Solomon	OT	Appalachian State
Tyrek Presley	WR	Unknown

==== Incoming ====
Player	Position	Previous School
AJ Hampton	CB	Northwestern
Tyler Grubbs	LB	Louisiana Tech
Dontae Fleming	WR	Louisiana
Cameron Wire	OT	LSU
Yulkeith Brown	WR	Texas A&M
Chris Carter	TE	USF
Kameron Pedescleaux	S	Louisiana
Tahir Annoor	CB	Wofford
Darius Swanson	S	Nebraska–Kearney
Shedro Louis	RB	Liberty

=== AAC preseason media poll ===
The preseason AAC poll was released on July 25, 2023.

Media poll
Predicted finish	Team	1st place votes
1	Tulane	20
2	UTSA	9
3	SMU	3
4	Memphis	1
5	Florida Atlantic	
6	East Carolina	
7	North Texas	
8	UAB	1
9	Navy	
10	Temple	
11	Tulsa	
12	Rice	
13	South Florida	
14	Charlotte	

=== Award watch lists ===
Listed in the order that they were released

Award	Player	Position	Year
Lott Trophy	Patrick Jenkins	DL	JR
Dodd Trophy	Willie Fritz	HC	--
Maxwell Award	Michael Pratt	QB	SR
Bronko Nagurski Trophy	Darius Hodges	DE	RS JR
Bronko Nagurski Trophy	Jarius Monroe	CB	SR
Outland Trophy	Sincere Haynesworth	OL	SR
Outland Trophy	Prince Pines	OL	RS SR
Paul Hornung Award	Jha'Quan Jackson	WR	SR
Wuerffel Trophy	Michael Pratt	QB	SR
Rimington Trophy	Sincere Haynesworth	OL	SR
Davey O'Brien Award	Michael Pratt	QB	SR
Jim Thorpe Award	Jarius Monroe	CB	SR
Walter Camp Award	Michael Pratt	QB	SR
Bednarik Award	Patrick Jenkins	DL	JR
Bednarik Award	Jarius Monroe	CB	SR

== Schedule ==
Date	Time	Opponent	Rank	Site	TV	Result	Attendance
September 2	7:00 p.m.	South Alabama*	No. 24	Yulman Stadium; New Orleans, LA	ESPNU	W 37–17	26,973
September 9	2:30 p.m.	No. 20 Ole Miss*	No. 24	Yulman Stadium; New Orleans, LA (rivalry)	ESPN2	L 20–37	30,000
September 16	3:00 p.m.	at Southern Miss*		M. M. Roberts Stadium; Hattiesburg, MS (Battle for the Bell)	ESPNU	W 21–3	25,038
September 23	6:00 p.m.	Nicholls*		Yulman Stadium; New Orleans, LA	ESPN+	W 36–7	22,842
September 30	11:00 a.m.	UAB		Yulman Stadium; New Orleans, LA	ESPN2	W 35–23	20,102
October 13	6:00 p.m.	at Memphis		Simmons Bank Liberty Stadium; Memphis, TN	ESPN	W 31–21	35,609
October 21	2:30 p.m.	North Texas^{†}	No. 23	Yulman Stadium; New Orleans, LA	ESPN2	W 35–28	30,000
October 28	3:00 p.m.	at Rice	No. 22	Rice Stadium; Houston, TX	ESPN2	W 30–28	20,436
November 4	2:30 p.m.	at East Carolina	No. 24	Dowdy-Ficklen Stadium; Greenville, NC	ESPNU	W 13–10	33,765
November 11	11:00 a.m.	Tulsa	No. 23	Yulman Stadium; New Orleans, LA	ESPN2	W 24–22	20,126
November 18	11:00 a.m.	at Florida Atlantic	No. 24	FAU Stadium; Boca Raton, FL	ESPN+	W 24–8	15,871
November 24	2:30 p.m.	UTSA	No. 23	Yulman Stadium; New Orleans, LA	ABC	W 29–16	25,103
December 2	4:00 p.m.	SMU	No. 22	Yulman Stadium; New Orleans, LA (AAC Championship Game)	ABC	L 14–26	25,206
December 27	1:00 p.m.	vs. Virginia Tech		Navy–Marine Corps Memorial Stadium; Annapolis, MD (Military Bowl)	ESPN	L 20–41	35,849
*Non-conference game; ^{†}Homecoming; Rankings from AP Poll (and CFP Rankings, after October 31) - Released prior to game; All times are in Central time

== Rankings ==
Ranking movements Legend: ██ Increase in ranking ██ Decrease in ranking — = Not ranked RV = Received votes
	Week															
Poll	Pre	1	2	3	4	5	6	7	8	9	10	11	12	13	14	Final
AP	24	24	RV	RV	RV	RV	RV	23	22	21	20	17	18	17	23	RV
Coaches	23	22	RV	RV	RV	RV	RV	24	23	21	20	17	18	18	24	RV
CFP	Not released									24	23	24	23	22	—	Not released

== Roster ==
2023 Tulane Green Wave football team roster
Players
Coaches
Offense

Pos.	#	Name	Class
RB	0	Shedro Louis	Sr
WR	1	Dontae Fleming	Jr
RB	2	Shaadie Clayton-Johnson	So
WR	3	Phat Watts	Sr
WR	4	Jha'Quan Jackson	Sr
WR	5	Yulkeith Brown	Jr
WR	6	Lawrence Keys III	Sr
QB	7	Michael Pratt	Sr
RB	8	Iverson Celestine	So
QB	9	Carson Haggard	Fr
QB	10	Darian Mensah	Fr
TE	11	Chris Carter	Jr
QB	12	Kai Horton	So
QB	13	Justin Ibieta	So
QB	14	Jack Risner	Fr
WR	15	Hunter Summers	Fr
WR	17	Chris Brazzell II	Fr
QB	19	Garrett Mmahat	Fr
RB	20	Arnold Barnes III	Fr
RB	21	Makhi Hughes	Fr
RB	24	Trey Cornist	Fr
WR	38	Yash Gupta	Fr
WR	39	Trevor Evans	So
RB	40	George Arata	Fr
WR	41	Michael Lavergne	So
RB	42	Lucas Barisas	So
RB	44	Charles Schibler	So
RB	46	Tate Jernigan	Jr
TE	48	Jonathan Kahn	So
OL	52	Sincere Haynesworth	Sr
OL	56	Shadre Hurst	Fr
OL	58	Caleb Thomas	Jr
OL	60	Ethan Marcus	So
OL	61	Cameron Wire	Sr
OL	65	Sully Burns	Fr
OL	68	Josh Remetich	Jr
OL	69	Rashad Green	Jr
OL	71	Matt Lombardi	So
OL	72	Trey Tuggle	So
OL	74	Landry Cannon	Fr
OL	75	Noah Gardner	Fr
OL	76	Prince Pines	Sr
OL	77	Darion Reed	Fr
OL	77	Keanon McNally	Fr
OL	78	Lajuan Owens	Fr
TE	80	Joshua Goines	Fr
WR	81	Luke Besh	So
WR	82	Reed Rutkowski	So
WR	83	Bryce Bohanon	So
WR	84	Lucas Desjardins	So
WR	85	Jalen Rogers	Fr
TE	86	Andrew Wilks	So
TE	87	Alex Bauman	So
TE	88	Blake Gunter	Fr
TE	89	Reggie Brown	Jr

Defense

Pos.	#	Name	Class
DL	0	Patrick Jenkins	Jr
DB	2	Jarius Monroe	Sr
DL	3	Angelo Anderson	Jr
DL	5	Keith Cooper Jr.	Jr
DL	6	Darius Hodges	Jr
DB	7	Lance Robinson	Sr
S	8	Kam Pedescleaux	Sr
LB	9	Corey Platt Jr.	So
DB	10	Tahir Annoor	Sr
DB	11	AJ Hampton	Sr
DB	12	D. J. Douglas	Jr
DB	13	Cadien Robinson	Fr
DB	14	Jai Eugene Jr.	Fr
DB	15	T. J. Huggins	So
DB	19	Kiland Harrison	Jr
DB	20	Jahiem Johnson	Fr
DL	20	Matthew Remondet	So
S	21	Andre Sam	Sr
DB	22	Gabe Liu	So
DB	23	Kevin Adams III	Fr
DB	24	Tyrek Presley	Jr
DB	25	Rayshawn Pleasant	Fr
S	26	Shi'Keem Laister	Jr
DE	27	Austin Sybrandt	So
LB	28	Dickson Agu	Fr
S	29	Allen Stewart	So
DB	29	Kentrell Webb	Fr
DB	30	Joshua Moore	Fr
S	31	Darius Swanson	Sr
S	32	Bailey Despanie	So
DB	33	Rodrek Williams II	So
S	34	Jean-Jacques Hunter	So
DE	35	Matthew Fobbs-White	Fr
LB	36	Mandel Eugene Jr.	So
LB	37	Harold Lawson	Fr
DB	38	Jared Moorer	So
DB	39	Brandon Kim	So
LB	40	Taylor Love	Fr
LB	41	Makai Williams	Fr
LB	42	Jean Claude Joseph III	Fr
DB	43	Rishi Rattan	So
DE	44	Michael Lunz	So
LB	45	Jared Small	GS
DB	46	Chadwick Bailey	So
DE	47	AJ Thomas	Fr
DE	48	Jah'rie Garner	Fr
FS	49	William Reed III	Fr
DL	51	James Laprocido	So
LB	52	Tyler Grubbs	Jr
DL	53	Isaiah Boyd	Fr
LB	54	Adam Uppuluri	So
DL	55	Noah Taliancich	Jr
LB	59	Jack Collins	So
DL	70	Kameron Hamilton	So
DE	90	Devean Deal	So
DL	92	Gerrod Henderson	Fr
DL	93	Elijah Champaigne	So
DL	94	Eric Hicks Jr.	Jr
DL	95	Adonis Friloux	So
DL	97	Maxie Baudoin IV	Fr
DL	98	Parker Petersen	So
LB	99	Jesus Machado	Jr

Special teams

Pos.	#	Name	Class
K	43	Valentino Ambrosio	Sr
LS	50	Jackson Schmelter	So
K/P	53	Bobby Noel	So
LS	57	Ethan Hudak	Jr
P	62	Brice Busch	Fr
K	81	Lucas Dunker Jr.	So
P	92	Ethan Greenberg	Fr
P	96	Casey Glover	Sr

Head coach

- Willie Fritz

Coordinators/assistant coaches

- Slade Nagle – Offensive coordinator
- Shiel Wood – Defensive coordinator
- Greg McMahon – Special teams coordinator
- Slade Nagle – Tight ends
- Michael Mutz – Linebackers
- Rob Greene – Defensive backs
- Carter Sheridan – Running backs
- Derrick Sherman – Wide receivers
- Gerald Chatman – Defensive line
- Dan Roushar – Offensive line
- Kurt Hester – Director, strength and conditioning
- Benjamin Moortgat – Assistant, strength and conditioning
- Shane Meyer – Director, football operations
- Wes Fritz – Director, player personnel
- Favian Upshaw – Offensive analyst
- J. J. McCleskey – Defensive analyst
- Marianna Salas – Defensive analyst/recruiting
- Jake Stone – Defensive analyst/recruiting
- Taylor Spotts-Orgeron – Offensive assistant
- Robert Beachem – Graduate assistant
- Jamar Mitchell – Graduate assistant
- Timothy Kennedy – Graduate assistant
- Mark Wright – Graduate assistant
- Dane Zeigler – Graduate assistant

Legend

- (C) Team captain
- (S) Suspended
- (I) Ineligible
- Injured
- Redshirt

Roster
Last update: 7/24/23

== Game summaries ==
=== vs South Alabama ===
South Alabama Jaguars (0–0) vs No. 24 Tulane Green Wave (0–0) – Game summary

Quarter	1	2	3	4	Total
Jaguars	0	10	7	0	17
No. 24 Green Wave	10	14	7	6	37

at Yulman Stadium, New Orleans, LA

- Date: September 2, 2023
- Game time: 7:00 p.m. CDT
- Game weather: Cloudy • Temperature: 81 °F (27 °C) • Wind: E 8 mph
- Game attendance: 26,973
- Referee: Kevin Randall
- TV announcers (ESPNU): John Schriffen (play-by-play), Rocky Boiman (color), Dawn Davenport (sideline)

Game information

First Quarter

- (13:09) TUL – Chris Brazzell II 4-yard pass from Michael Pratt, Valentino Ambrosio kick (Drive: 3 plays, 38 yards, 1:21; Tulane 7–0)
- (2:40) TUL – Valentino Ambrosio 29-yard field goal (Drive: 10 plays, 54 yards, 5:40; Tulane 10–0)

Second Quarter

- (11:54) USA – Carter Bradley 4-yard run, Diego Guajardo kick (Drive: 11 plays, 75 yards, 5:46; Tulane 10–7)
- (10:34) TUL – Jha'Quan Jackson 47-yard pass from Michael Pratt, Valentino Ambrosio kick (Drive: 3 plays, 75 yards, 1:20; Tulane 17–7)
- (7:39) TUL – Lawrence Keys III 47-yard pass from Michael Pratt, Valentino Ambrosio kick (Drive: 2 plays, 53 yards, 0:30; Tulane 24–7)
- (1:39) USA – Diego Guajardo 36-yard field goal (Drive: 4 plays, -6 yards, 0:57; Tulane 24–10)

Third Quarter

- (7:12) USA – Devin Voisin 7-yard pass from Carter Bradley, Diego Guajardo kick (Drive: 11 plays, 53 yards, 5:44; Tulane 24–17)
- (4:27) TUL – Jha'Quan Jackson 48-yard pass from Michael Pratt, Valentino Ambrosio kick (Drive: 5 plays, 75 yards, 2:45; Tulane 31–17)

Fourth Quarter

- (8:37) TUL – Valentino Ambrosio 30-yard field goal (Drive: 7 plays, 31 yards, 3:57; Tulane 34–17)
- (8:37) TUL – Valentino Ambrosio 27-yard field goal (Drive: 7 plays, 16 yards, 4:38; Tulane 37–17)

Statistics	USA	TUL
First downs	18	16
Total yards	265	436
Rushing yards	75	142
Passing yards	190	294
Passing: Comp–Att–Int	23–30–2	14–15–0
Time of possession	29:23	30:37

Team	Category	Player	Statistics
South Alabama	Passing	Carter Bradley	23/30, 190 yards, TD, 2 INT
South Alabama	Rushing	La'Damian Webb	9 carries, 40 yards
South Alabama	Receiving	Jamaal Pritchett	5 receptions, 63 yards
Tulane	Passing	Michael Pratt	14/15, 294 yards, 4 TD
Tulane	Rushing	Makhi Hughes	8 carries, 41 yards
Tulane	Receiving	Jha'Quan Jackson	3 receptions, 106 yards, 2 TD

=== vs No. 20 Ole Miss ===
No. 20 Ole Miss Rebels (1–0) vs No. 24 Tulane Green Wave (1–0) – Game summary

Quarter	1	2	3	4	Total
No. 20 Rebels	7	3	7	20	37
No. 24 Green Wave	7	10	0	3	20

at Yulman Stadium, New Orleans, LA

- Date: September 9, 2023
- Game time: 2:30 p.m. CDT
- Game weather: Sunny • Temperature: 90 °F (32 °C) • Wind: NW 7 mph
- Game attendance: 30,000
- Referee: Tim Rich
- TV announcers (ESPN2): Dave Pasch (play-by-play), Dusty Dvoracek (color), Tom Luginbill (sideline)

Game information

First Quarter

- (14:12) MISS – Tre Harris 31-yard pass from Jaxson Dart, Caden Davis kick (Drive: 3 plays, 75 yards, 0:48; Ole Miss 7–0)
- (9:37) TUL – Makhi Hughes 2-yard run, Valentino Ambrosio kick (Drive: 9 plays, 75 yards, 4:35; Tied 7–7)

Second Quarter

- (14:10) TUL – Valentino Ambrosio 44-yard field goal (Drive: 7 plays, 7 yards, 2:58; Tulane 10–7)
- (5:49) TUL – Jha'Quan Jackson 41-yard pass from Kai Horton, Valentino Ambrosio kick (Drive: 4 plays, 54 yards, 1:45; Tulane 17–7)
- (1:36) MISS – Caden Davis 37-yard field goal (Drive: 13 plays, 62 yards, 4:05; Tulane 17–10)

Third Quarter

- (6:11) MISS – Quinshon Judkins 9-yard run, Caden Davis kick (Drive: 4 plays, 64 yards, 1:24; Tied 17–17)

Fourth Quarter

- (12:50) MISS – Caden Davis 27-yard field goal (Drive: 6 plays, 10 yards, 2:40; Ole Miss 20–17)
- (4:28) MISS – Michael Trigg 21-yard pass from Jaxson Dart, Caden Davis kick (Drive: 5 plays, 70 yards, 2:21; Ole Miss 27–17)
- (2:56) TUL – Valentino Ambrosio 26-yard field goal (Drive: 10 plays, 67 yards, 1:32; Ole Miss 27–20)
- (1:36) MISS – Caden Davis 56-yard field goal (Drive: 4 plays, 4 yards, 1:03; Ole Miss 30–20)
- (1:25) MISS – Jared Ivey 26-yard fumble return, Caden Davis kick (Drive: 2 plays, 1 yards, 0:28; Ole Miss 37–20)

Statistics	MISS	TUL
First downs	18	18
Total yards	363	342
Rushing yards	89	111
Passing yards	274	231
Turnovers	1	2
Time of possession	25:15	34:45

Team	Category	Player	Statistics
Ole Miss	Passing	Jaxson Dart	17/27, 267 yards, 2 TD, 1 INT
Ole Miss	Rushing	Quinshon Judkins	18 carries, 48 yards, 1 TD
Ole Miss	Receiving	Dayton Wade	7 receptions, 106 yards
Tulane	Passing	Kai Horton	15/37, 231 yards 1 TD, 1 INT
Tulane	Rushing	Makhi Hughes	23 carries, 92 yards, 1 TD
Tulane	Receiving	Lawrence Keys III	5 receptions, 94 yards

=== at Southern Miss ===
Tulane Green Wave (1–1) at Southern Miss Golden Eagles (1–1) – Game summary

Quarter	1	2	3	4	Total
Green Wave	7	0	14	0	21
Golden Eagles	0	0	3	0	3

at M.M. Roberts Stadium, Hattiesburg, MS

- Date: September 16, 2023
- Game time: 3:00 p.m. CDT
- Game weather: Sunny • Temperature: 92 °F (33 °C) • Wind: NW 12 mph
- Game attendance: 25,038
- Referee: Jeremy Parker
- TV announcers (ESPNU): Jay Alter (play-by-play), Rene Ingoglia (color)

Game information

First Quarter

- (12:16) TUL – Kai Horton 1-yard run, Valentino Ambrosio kick (Drive: 7 plays, 75 yards, 2:44; Tulane 7–0)

Second Quarter

No scoring

Third Quarter

- (10:19) TUL – Jha'Quan Jackson 35-yard pass from Kai Horton, Valentino Ambrosio kick (Drive: 5 plays, 70 yards, 2:19; Tulane 14–0)
- (5:45) USM – Valentino Ambrosio 29-yard field goal (Drive: 9 plays, 59 yards, 4:27; Tulane 14–3)
- (2:03) TUL – Chris Brazzell II 3-yard pass from Kai Horton, Valentino Ambrosio kick (Drive: 9 plays, 75 yards, 3:42; Tulane 21–3)

Fourth Quarter

No scoring

Statistics	TUL	USM
First downs	18	14
Total yards	314	212
Rushing yards	128	35
Passing yards	186	177
Turnovers	0	0
Time of possession	28:23	31:37

Team	Category	Player	Statistics
Tulane	Passing	Kai Horton	12/19, 186 yards, 2 TD
Tulane	Rushing	Makhi Hughes	13 carries, 83 yards
Tulane	Receiving	Lawrence Keys III	4 receptions, 78 yards
Southern Miss	Passing	Billy Wiles	19/33, 177 yards
Southern Miss	Rushing	Rodrigues Clark	5 carries, 17 yards
Southern Miss	Receiving	Jakarius Caston	2 receptions, 54 yards

=== vs Nicholls ===
Nicholls Colonels (0–2) vs Tulane Green Wave (2–1) – Game summary

Quarter	1	2	3	4	Total
Colonels	0	7	0	0	7
Green Wave	17	10	6	3	36

at Yulman Stadium • New Orleans, LA

- Date: September 23, 2023
- Game time: 6:00 p.m.
- Game weather: Sunny • Temperature: 86 °F (30 °C) • Wind: SE 5 mph
- Game attendance: 22,842
- Referee: Steven Anderson
- TV announcers (ESPN+): Richard Cross (play-by-play), Taylor McHargue (color)

Game information

First Quarter

- (10:32) TUL – Shi'Keem Laister 27-yard punt return, Valentino Ambrosio kick (Drive: 5 plays, 17 yards, 2:36; Tulane 7–0)
- (1:30) TUL – Valentino Ambrosio 32-yard field goal (Drive: 10 plays, 36 yards, 5:26; Tulane 10–0)
- (0:12) TUL – Lawrence Keys III 40-yard pass from Michael Pratt, Valentino Ambrosio kick (Drive: 1 play, 40 yards, 0:08; Tulane 17–0)

Second Quarter

- (9:08) TUL – Lawrence Keys III 15-yard pass from Michael Pratt, Valentino Ambrosio kick (Drive: 3 plays, 15 yards, 1:52; Tulane 24–0)
- (3:33) NICH – Neno Lemay 13-yard pass from Pat McQuaide, Gavin Lasseigne kick (Drive: 9 plays, 75 yards, 5:35; Tulane 24–7)
- (0:38) TUL – Valentino Ambrosio 45-yard field goal (Drive: 10 plays, 41 yards, 2:50; Tulane 27–7)

Third Quarter

- (4:01) TUL – Michael Pratt 1-yard run, two-point pass conversion attempt failed (Drive: 3 plays, 10 yards, 1:08; Tulane 33–7)

Fourth Quarter

- (6:19) TUL – Valentino Ambrosio 31-yard field goal (Drive: 6 plays, 74 yards, 2:39; Tulane 36–7)

Statistics	NICH	TUL
First downs	21	19
Total yards	335	408
Rushing yards	62	150
Passing yards	273	258
Turnovers	4	3
Time of possession	32:26	27:34

Team	Category	Player	Statistics
Nicholls	Passing	Pat McQuaide	27/39, 273 yards, TD, 4 INTs
Nicholls	Rushing	Collin Guggenheim	14 carries, 56 yards
Nicholls	Receiving	Neno Lemay	8 receptions, 75 yards, TD
Tulane	Passing	Michael Pratt	18/23, 190 yards, 2 TDs, INT
Tulane	Rushing	Arnold Barnes III	4 carries, 71 yards
Tulane	Receiving	Lawrence Keys III	4 receptions, 77 yards, 2 TDs

=== vs UAB ===
UAB Blazers (1–3) vs Tulane Green Wave (3–1) – Game summary

Quarter	1	2	3	4	Total
Blazers	3	17	0	3	23
Green Wave	7	7	14	7	35

at Yulman Stadium, New Orleans, LA

- Date: September 30, 2023
- Game time: 11:00 a.m. CDT
- Game weather: Sunny • Temperature: 85 °F (29 °C) • Wind: NE 14 mph
- Game attendance: 20,102
- Referee: Luke Richmond
- TV announcers (ESPN2): Roy Philpott (play-by-play), Roddy Jones (color), Alex Chappell (sideline)

Game information

First Quarter

- (9:19) UAB – Matt Quinn 31-yard field goal (Drive: 11 plays, 65 yards, 5:36; UAB 3–0)
- (2:50) TUL – Yulkeith Brown 15-yard run, Valentino Armbrosio kick (Drive: 6 plays, 52 yards, 2:01; Tulane 7–3)

Second Quarter

- (13:08) UAB – Isaiah Jacobs 2-yard run, Matt Quinn kick (Drive: 12 plays, 75 yards, 4:42; UAB 10–7)
- (10:15) UAB – Isaiah Jacobs 17-yard run, Matt Quinn kick (Drive: 2 plays, 24 yards, 0:39; UAB 17–7)
- (5:05) UAB – Matt Quinn 48-yard field goal (Drive: 8 plays, 37 yards, 3:38; UAB 20–7)
- (0:46) TUL – Makhi Hughes 1-yard run, Valentino Armbrosio kick (Drive: 9 plays, 75 yards, 4:19; UAB 20–14)

Third Quarter

- (13:35) TUL – Makhi Hughes 18-yard run, Valentino Armbrosio kick (Drive: 3 plays, 63 yards, 1:18; Tulane 21–20)
- (2:50) TUL – Alex Bauman 14-yard pass from Michael Pratt, Valentino Ambrosio kick (Drive: 5 plays, 56 yards, 1:55; Tulane 28–20)

Fourth Quarter

- (5:05) UAB – Matt Quinn 36-yard field goal (Drive: 9 plays, 55 yards, 3:08; Tulane 28–23)
- (0:47) TUL – Lawrence Keys III 32-yard pass from Michael Pratt, Valentino Ambrosio kick (Drive: 9 plays, 61 yards, 3:55; Tulane 35–23)

Statistics	UAB	TUL
First downs	25	24
Total yards	434	448
Rushing yards	170	264
Passing yards	264	184
Turnovers	1	2
Time of possession	30:05	29:55

Team	Category	Player	Statistics
UAB	Passing	Jacob Zeno	27/35, 236 yards
UAB	Rushing	Isaiah Jacobs	18 carries, 95 yards, 2 TD
UAB	Receiving	Amare Thomas	8 receptions, 99 yards
Tulane	Passing	Michael Pratt	14/23, 184 yards, 2 TD
Tulane	Rushing	Makhi Hughes	22 carries, 123 yards, 2 TD
Tulane	Receiving	Lawrence Keys III	3 receptions, 54 yards, 1 TD

=== at Memphis ===
Tulane Green Wave (4–1) at Memphis Tigers (4–1) – Game summary

Quarter	1	2	3	4	Total
Green Wave	7	3	7	14	31
Tigers	0	14	7	0	21

at Simmons Bank Liberty Stadium, Memphis, TN

- Date: October 13, 2023
- Game time: 6:00 p.m. CDT
- Game weather: Cloudy • Temperature: 73 °F (23 °C) • Wind: S 8 mph
- Game attendance: 35,609
- Referee: Kevin Randall
- TV announcers (ESPN): Anish Shroff (play-by-play), Andre Ware (color), Paul Carcaterra (sideline)

Game information

First Quarter

- (4:06) TUL – Makhi Hughes 2-yard run, Valentino Ambrosio kick (Drive: 9 plays, 72 yards, 3:46; Tulane 7–0)

Second Quarter

- (8:11) TUL – Valentino Ambrosio 26-yard field goal (Drive: 14 plays, 51 yards, 6:30; Tulane 10–0)
- (5:15) MEM – Demeer Blankumsee 17-yard pass from Seth Henigan, Tanner Gillis kick (Drive: 8 plays, 89 yards, 2:56; Tulane 10–7)
- (0:45) MEM – Joseph Scates 28-yard pass from Seth Henigan, Tanner Gillis kick (Drive: 8 plays, 77 yards, 1:51; Memphis 14–10)

Third Quarter

- (10:09) MEM – Koby Drake 10-yard pass from Seth Henigan, Tanner Gillis kick (Drive: 9 plays, 75 yards, 4:51; Memphis 21–10)
- (4:32) TUL – Michael Pratt 1-yard run, Valentino Ambrosio kick (Drive: 10 plays, 55 yards, 5:37; Memphis 21–17)

Fourth Quarter

- (14:55) TUL – Yulkeith Brown 9-yard run, Valentino Ambrosio kick (Drive: 5 plays, 69 yards, 2:34; Tulane 24–21)
- (11:46) TUL – Lawrence Keys III 11-yard pass from Michael Pratt, Valentino Ambrosio kick (Drive: 4 plays, 52 yards, 1:52; Tulane 31–21)

Statistics	TUL	MEM
First downs	20	20
Total yards	403	366
Rushing yards	144	45
Passing yards	259	321
Turnovers	0	2
Time of possession	36:58	23:02

Team	Category	Player	Statistics
Tulane	Passing	Michael Pratt	19/31, 259 yards, 1 TD
Tulane	Rushing	Makhi Hughes	26 carries, 130 yards, 1 TD
Tulane	Receiving	Chris Brazzell II	3 receptions, 103 yards
Memphis	Passing	Seth Henigan	24/43, 321 yards, 3 TD, 2 INT
Memphis	Rushing	Sutton Smith	4 carries, 22 yards
Memphis	Receiving	Demeer Blankumsee	6 receptions, 108 yards

=== vs North Texas ===
North Texas Mean Green (3–3) vs No. 23 Tulane Green Wave (5–1) – Game summary

Quarter	1	2	3	4	Total
Mean Green	0	0	21	7	28
No. 23 Green Wave	7	14	7	7	35

at Yulman Stadium, New Orleans, LA

- Date: October 21, 2023
- Game time: 2:30 p.m. CDT
- Game weather: Sunny • Temperature: 85 °F (29 °C) • Wind: SE 6 mph
- Game attendance: 30,000
- Referee: Nate Black
- TV announcers (ESPN2): Beth Mowins (play-by-play), Kirk Morrison (color), Stormy Buonantony (sideline)

Game information

First Quarter

- (9:34) TUL – Alex Bauman 2-yard pass from Michael Pratt, Valentino Ambrosio kick (Drive: 6 plays, 53 yards, 2:58; Tulane 7–0)

Second Quarter

- (5:12) TUL – Makhi Hughes 10-yard run, Valentino Ambrosio kick (Drive: 8 plays, 48 yards, 3:33; Tulane 14–0)
- (0:17) TUL – Lawrence Keys III 23-yard pass from Michael Pratt, Valentino Ambrosio kick (Drive: 5 plays, 73 yards, 0:41; Tulane 21–0)

Third Quarter

- (10:20) UNT – Ja'Mori Maclin 7-yard pass from Chandler Rogers, Noah Rauschenberg kick (Drive: 9 plays, 88 yards, 2:49; Tulane 21–7)
- (4:39) TUL – Alex Bauman 21-yard pass from Michael Pratt, Valentino Ambrosio kick (Drive: 10 plays, 75 yards, 5:41; Tulane 28–7)
- (3:05) UNT – Ayo Adeyi 18-yard run, Noah Rauschenberg kick (Drive: 4 plays, 75 yards, 1:34; Tulane 28–14)
- (0:17) UNT – Oscar Adaway III 1-yard run, Noah Rauschenberg kick (Drive: 8 plays, 53 yards, 2:47; Tulane 28–21)

Fourth Quarter

- (9:08) UNT – Landon Sides 6-yard pass from Chandler Rogers, Noah Rauschenberg kick (Drive: 10 plays, 65 yards, 4:35; Tied 28–28)
- (2:34) TUL – Michael Pratt 19-yard run, Valentino Ambrosio kick (Drive: 13 plays, 75 yards, 6:34; Tulane 35–28)

Statistics	UNT	TUL
First downs	23	24
Total yards	426	439
Rushing yards	83	245
Passing yards	343	194
Turnovers	1	2
Time of possession	27:24	32:36

Team	Category	Player	Statistics
North Texas	Passing	Chandler Rogers	35/51, 343 yards, 2 TD
North Texas	Rushing	Chandler Rogers	8 carries, 34 yards
North Texas	Receiving	Ja'Mori Maclin	8 receptions, 71 yards, 1 TD
Tulane	Passing	Michael Pratt	15/21, 194 yards, 3 TD, 1 INT
Tulane	Rushing	Makhi Hughes	20 carries, 121 yards, 1 TD
Tulane	Receiving	Lawrence Keys III	5 receptions, 78 yards, 1 TD

=== at Rice ===
No. 22 Tulane Green Wave (6–1) at Rice Owls (4–3) – Game summary

Quarter	1	2	3	4	Total
No. 22 Green Wave	10	17	0	3	30
Owls	7	0	14	7	28

at Rice Stadium, Houston, TX

- Date: October 28, 2023
- Game time: 3:00 p.m. CDT
- Game weather: Cloudy • Temperature: 86 °F (30 °C) • Wind: SE 14 mph
- Game attendance: 20,436
- Referee: Edwin Lee
- TV announcers (ESPN2): Drew Carter (play-by-play), Brock Osweiler (analyst), Kayla Burton (sideline)

Game information
First quarter
- (12:57) TUL – Valentino Ambrosio 44-yard field goal (Drive: 5 plays, 49 yards, 2:03; Green Wave 3–0)
- (9:23) TUL – Yulkieth Brown 26-yard pass from Michael Pratt, Valentino Ambrosio kick (Drive: 4 plays, 78 yards, 1:49; Green Wave 10–0)
- (5:26) RICE – Juma Otoviano 5-yard run, Tim Horn kick (Drive: 7 plays, 82 yards, 3:50; Green Wave 10–7)

Second quarter

- (13:59) TUL – Michael Pratt 1-yard run, Valentino Ambrosio kick (Drive: 13 plays, 75 yards, 6:27; Green Wave 17–7)
- (3:12) TUL – Alex Bauman 1-yard pass from Michael Pratt, Valentino Ambrosio kick (Drive: 8 plays, 50 yards, 4:12; Green Wave 24–7)
- (0:00) TUL – Valentino Ambrosio 41-yard field goal (Drive: 3 plays, 35 yards, 0:16; Green Wave 27–7)

Third quarter

- (7:44) RICE – Juma Otoviano 3-yard run, Tim Horn kick (Drive: 12 plays, 75 yards, 7:16; Green Wave 27–14)
- (4:15) RICE – Boden Groen 4-yard pass from JT Daniels, Tim Horn kick (Drive: 2 plays, 3 yards, 0:45; Green Wave 27–21)

Fourth quarter

- (11:41) TUL – Valentino Ambrosio 43-yard field goal (Drive: 8 plays, 30 yards, 3:49; Green Wave 30–21)
- (8:16) RICE – Luke McCaffrey 35-yard pass from JT Daniels, Tim Horn kick (Drive: 6 plays, 75 yards, 3:25; Green Wave 30–28)

Statistics	TUL	RICE
First downs	24	15
Total yards	457	271
Rushing yards	194	82
Passing yards	263	189
Turnovers	1	1
Time of possession	36:05	23:55

Team	Category	Player	Statistics
Tulane	Passing	Michael Pratt	22/30, 263 yards, 2 TD, INT
Tulane	Rushing	Makhi Hughes	23 rushes, 153 yards
Tulane	Receiving	Chris Brazzell II	5 receptions, 75 yards
Rice	Passing	JT Daniels	18/29, 189 yards, 2 TD, INT
Rice	Rushing	Juma Otoviano	9 rushes, 38 yards, 2 TD
Rice	Receiving	Luke McCaffrey	5 receptions, 79 yards, TD

=== at East Carolina ===
No. 24 Tulane Green Wave (7–1) at East Carolina Pirates (1–7) – Game summary

Quarter	1	2	3	4	Total
No. 24 Green Wave	0	10	0	3	13
Pirates	10	0	0	0	10

at Dowdy-Ficklen Stadium, Greenville, NC

- Date: November 4, 2023
- Game time: 2:30 p.m. CDT
- Game weather: Sunny • Temperature: 71 °F (22 °C) • Wind: S 7 mph
- Game attendance: 33,765
- Referee: Tim Rich
- TV announcers (ESPNU): Jay Alter (play-by-play), Rene Ingoglia (color)

Game information

First Quarter

- (8:37) ECU – Andrew Conrad 27-yard field goal (Drive: 13 plays, 71 yards, 6:17; East Carolina 3–0)
- (1:47) ECU – Gerald Green 1-yard run, Andrew Conrad kick (Drive: 6 plays, 78 yards, 3:41; East Carolina 10–0)

Second Quarter

- (4:08) TUL – Lawrence Keys III 9-yard pass from Michael Pratt, Valentino Ambrosio kick (Drive: 14 plays, 92 yards, 8:37; East Carolina 10–7)
- (0:00) TUL – Valentino Ambrosio 21-yard field goal (Drive: 9 plays, 62 yards, 3:05; Tied 10–10)

Third Quarter

No scoring

Fourth Quarter

- (14:14) TUL – Valentino Ambrosio 26-yard field goal (Drive: 11 plays, 70 yards, 6:48; Tulane 13–10)

Statistics	TUL	ECU
First downs	20	10
Total yards	368	190
Rushing yards	155	70
Passing yards	213	120
Turnovers	0	0
Time of possession	38:12	21:48

Team	Category	Player	Statistics
Tulane	Passing	Michael Pratt	16/25, 213 yards, 1 TD
Tulane	Rushing	Makhi Hughes	25 carries, 105 yards
Tulane	Receiving	Lawrence Keys III	3 receptions, 77 yards, 1 TD
East Carolina	Passing	Alex Flinn	10/18, 120 yards
East Carolina	Rushing	Rahjai Harris	13 carries, 52 yards
East Carolina	Receiving	Jaylen Johnson	3 receptions, 40 yards

=== vs Tulsa ===
Tulsa Golden Hurricane (3–6) vs No. 23 Tulane Green Wave (8–1) – Game summary

Quarter	1	2	3	4	Total
Golden Hurricane	0	10	3	9	22
No. 23 Green Wave	14	0	7	3	24

at Yulman Stadium, New Orleans, LA

- Date: November 11, 2023
- Game time: 11:00 a.m. CDT
- Game weather: Cloudy • Temperature: 67 °F (19 °C) • Wind: NE 8 mph
- Game attendance: 20,126
- Referee: Scott Hardin
- TV announcers (ESPN2): Roy Philpott (play-by-play), Roddy White (color), Taylor McGregor (sideline)

Game information

First quarter

- (7:14) TUL – Makhi Hughes 1-yard run, Valentino Ambrosio kick (Drive: 12 plays, 70 yards, 5:53; Tulane 7–0)
- (0:00) TUL – Alex Bauman 39-yard pass from Michael Pratt, Valentino Ambrosio kick (Drive: 5 plays, 82 yards, 2:04; Tulane 14–0)

Second quarter

- (13:31) TLSA – Kamdyn Benjamin 8-yard pass from Kirk Francis, Chase Meyer kick (Drive: 5 plays, 75 yards, 1:29; Tulane 14–7)
- (7:23) TLSA – Chase Meyer 37-yard field goal (Drive: 10 plays, 65 yards, 3:18; Tulane 14–10)

Third quarter

- (14:47) TUL – Shedro Louis 100-yard kickoff return, Valentino Ambrosio kick (Drive: Tulane 21–10)
- (5:50) TLSA – Chase Meyer 30-yard field goal (Drive: 8 plays, 69 yards, 3:18; Tulane 21–13)

Fourth quarter

- (13:58) TLSA – Chase Meyer 47-yard field goal (Drive: 11 plays, 48 yards, 3:57; Tulane 21–16)
- (9:21) TUL – Valentino Ambrosio 30-yard field goal (Drive: 9 plays, 60 yards, 4:29; Tulane 24–16)
- (3:03) TLSA – Kamdyn Benjamin 4-yard pass from Braylon Braxton (Drive: 4 plays, 67 yards, 1:40; Tulane 24–22)

Statistics	TLSA	TUL
First downs	22	17
Total yards	477	357
Rushing yards	122	163
Passing yards	355	194
Turnovers	1	1
Time of possession	29:29	30:31

Team	Category	Player	Statistics
Tulsa	Passing	Kirk Francis	22/34, 345 yards, TD
Tulsa	Rushing	Anthony Watkins	15 carries, 76 yards
Tulsa	Receiving	Kamdyn Benjamin	8 receptions, 157 yards, 2 TD
Tulane	Passing	Michael Pratt	16/29, 194 yards, TD, INT
Tulane	Rushing	Makhi Hughes	19 carries, 131 yards, TD
Tulane	Receiving	Bryce Bohanon	4 receptions, 57 yards

=== at Florida Atlantic ===
No. 24 Tulane Green Wave (9–1) at Florida Atlantic Owls (4–6) – Game summary

Quarter	1	2	3	4	Total
No. 24 Green Wave	7	7	10	0	24
Owls	0	0	0	8	8

at FAU Stadium, Boca Raton, FL

- Date: November 18, 2023
- Game time: 11:00 a.m. CDT
- Game weather: Sunny
- Game attendance: 15,871
- Referee: Nate Black
- TV: ESPN+

Game information

First Quarter

- (5:10) TUL – Chris Carter 9-yard pass from Michael Pratt, Valentino Ambrosio kick (Drive: 5 plays, 77 yards, 2:32; Tulane 7–0)

Second Quarter

- (14:14) TUL – Chris Brazzell II 9-yard pass from Michael Pratt, Valentino Ambrosio kick (Drive: 9 plays, 58 yards, 3:51; Tulane 14–0)

Third Quarter

- (7:39) TUL – Chris Carter 8-yard pass from Michael Pratt, Valentino Ambrosio kick (Drive: 11 plays, 55 yards, 5:59; Tulane 21–0)
- (0:12) TUL – Valentino Ambrosio 20-yard field goal (Drive: 11 plays, 73 yards, 6:14; Tulane 24–0)

Fourth Quarter

- (8:58) FAU – Kahlil Brantley 4-yard pass from Daniel Richardson (Drive: 15 plays, 75 yards, 6:14; Tulane 24–8)

Statistics	TUL	FAU
First downs	17	14
Total yards	336	234
Rushing yards	84	32
Passing yards	252	202
Turnovers	1	1
Time of possession	32:08	27:52

Team	Category	Player	Statistics
Tulane	Passing	Michael Pratt	21/28, 252 yards, 3 TD
Tulane	Rushing	Makhi Hughes	21 carries, 72 yards
Tulane	Receiving	Chris Brazzell II	7 receptions, 103 yards, TD
Florida Atlantic	Passing	Daniel Richardson	24/31, 202 yards, TD, INT
Florida Atlantic	Rushing	Larry McCammon	10 carries, 32 yards
Florida Atlantic	Receiving	LaJohntay Wester	11 receptions, 86 yards

=== vs UTSA ===
UTSA Roadrunners (8–3) vs No. 23 Tulane Green Wave (10–1) – Game summary

Quarter	1	2	3	4	Total
Roadrunners	7	3	0	6	16
No. 23 Green Wave	7	16	0	6	29

at Yulman Stadium, New Orleans, LA

- Date: November 24, 2023
- Game time: 2:30 p.m. CDT
- Game weather: Cloudy • Temperature: 59 °F (15 °C) • Wind: NE 7 mph
- Game attendance: 25,103
- Referee: Luke Richmond
- TV: ABC

Game information

First Quarter

- (13:47) TUL – Chris Brazzell II 7-yard pass from Michael Pratt, Valentino Ambrosio kick (Drive: 3 plays, 10 yards, 0:45; Tulane 7–0)
- (9:22) UTSA – Rocko Griffin 23-yard run, Chase Allen kick (Drive: 3 plays, 30 yards, 0:55; Tied 7–7)

Second Quarter

- (14:08) UTSA – Chase Allen 40-yard field goal (Drive: 8 plays, 34 yards, 2:58; UTSA 10–7)
- (11:53) TUL – Valentino Ambrosio 47-yard field goal (Drive: 6 plays, 46 yards, 2:15; Tied 10–10)
- (5:40) TUL – Valentino Ambrosio 26-yard field goal (Drive: 6 plays, 68 yards, 3:17; Tulane 13–10)
- (3:27) TUL – Mahki Hughes 2-yard run, Valentino Ambrosio kick (Drive: 5 plays, 48 yards, 1:32; Tulane 20–10)
- (0:00) TUL – Valentino Ambrosio 23-yard field goal (Drive: 8 plays, 38 yards, 1:50; Tulane 23–10)

Third Quarter

No scoring

Fourth Quarter

- (5:18) TUL – Chris Brazzell II 3-yard pass from Michael Pratt (Drive: 5 plays, 32 yards, 2:08; Tulane 29–10)
- (1:33) UTSA – Oscar Cardenas 9-yard pass from Frank Harris (Drive: 14 plays, 75 yards, 3:45; Tulane 29–16)

Statistics	UTSA	TUL
First downs	21	13
Total yards	375	352
Rushing yards	177	227
Passing yards	198	125
Turnovers	5	1
Time of possession	31:42	28:18

Team	Category	Player	Statistics
UTSA	Passing	Frank Harris	25/38, 198 yards, TD, 2 INT
UTSA	Rushing	Kevorian Barnes	12 carries, 92 yards
UTSA	Receiving	Joshua Cephus	6 receptions, 83 yards
Tulane	Passing	Michael Pratt	9/22, 125 yards, 2 TD
Tulane	Rushing	Makhi Hughes	26 carries, 166 yards, TD
Tulane	Receiving	Chris Brazzell II	5 receptions, 93 yards, 2 TD

=== vs SMU (AAC Championship Game) ===
UTSA Roadrunners (10–2) vs No. 22 Tulane Green Wave (11–1) – Game summary (2023 AAC Football Championship Game)

Quarter	1	2	3	4	Total
Mustangs	7	7	3	9	26
No. 22 Green Wave	7	0	7	0	14

at Yulman Stadium, New Orleans, LA

- Date: December 2, 2023
- Game time: 4:00 p.m. CDT
- Game weather: Rain, 72 °F (22 °C)
- Game attendance: 25,206
- Referee: Luke Richmond
- TV announcers (ABC): Roy Philpott, Roddy Jones, and Taylor McGregor

Game information

First Quarter

- TULN – Michael Pratt 1-yard run (Valentino Ambrosio kick), 14:50. Green Wave 7–0. Drive: 1 play, 1 yard, 0:03.
- SMU – Jaylan Knighton 6-yard run (Collin Rogers kick), 7:37. Tied 7–7. Drive: 5 plays, 50 yards, 1:37.

Second Quarter

- SMU – Key'Shawn Smith 17-yard pass from Kevin Jennings (Collin Rogers kick), 1:32. Mustangs 14–7. Drive: 10 plays, 65 yards, 4:18.

Third Quarter

- TULN – Yulkieth Brown 42-yard pass from Michael Pratt (Valentino Ambrosio kick), 8:46. Tied 14–14. Drive: 5 plays, 63 yards, 2:34.
- SMU – Collin Rogers 48-yard field goal, 5:35. Mustangs 17–14. Drive: 7 plays, 41 yards, 3:11.

Fourth Quarter

- SMU – Collin Rogers 32-yard field goal, 12:38. Mustangs 20–14. Drive: 11 plays, 52 yards, 5:52.
- SMU – Collin Rogers 32-yard field goal, 8:58. Mustangs 23–14. Drive: 5 plays, 15 yards, 1:47.
- SMU – Collin Rogers 45-yard field goal, 3:15. Mustangs 26–14. Drive: 6 plays, 9 yards, 1:13.

Statistics	SMU	TUL
First downs	21	12
Total yards	396	269
Rushing yards	193	31
Passing yards	203	238
Turnovers	3	1
Time of possession	34:07	25:53

Team	Category	Player	Statistics
SMU	Passing	Kevin Jennings	19/33, 203 yards, TD, 2 INT
SMU	Rushing	Jaylan Knighton	15 rushes, 75 yards, TD
SMU	Receiving	R. J. Maryland	5 receptions, 56 yards
Tulane	Passing	Michael Pratt	21/36, 238 yards, TD, INT
Tulane	Rushing	Makhi Hughes	11 rushes, 44 yards
Tulane	Receiving	Yulkeith Brown	5 receptions, 90 yards, TD

=== vs Virginia Tech (Military Bowl) ===
Virginia Tech Hokies (6–6) vs. Tulane Green Wave (11–2) – Game summary (2023 Military Bowl)

Quarter	1	2	3	4	Total
Hokies	10	7	10	14	41
No. 23 Green Wave	7	3	7	3	20

at Navy–Marine Corps Memorial Stadium, Annapolis, MD

- Date: December 27, 2023
- Game time: 1:00 p.m. CDT
- Game weather: Rainy • Temperature: 54 °F (12 °C)
- Game attendance: 35,848
- Referee: Trennis Livingston
- TV announcers (ESPN): Jay Alter (play-by-play), Rene Ingoglia (analyst), and Alex Chappell (sideline)

Game information

First Quarter

- (12:01) TULA – Tyler Grubbs 21 yd Fumble Return (Valentino Ambrosio Kick) (TULA 7–0)
- (5:33) VT - John Love 35 yd Field Goal (Drive: 14 plays, 57 yards, 6:28; TULA 7-3)
- (2:20) VT - Kyron Drones 11 yd Rush (John Love Kick) (Drive: 1 play, 11 yards, 0:09; VT 10-7)

Second Quarter

- (4:40) TULA – Valentino Ambrosio 49 yd Field Goal (Drive: 7 plays, 23 yards, 3:58; 10–10)
- (0:08) VT - Harrison Saint Germain 1 yd Pass From Kyron Drones (John Love Kick) (Drive: 11 plays, 75 yards, 4:32; VT 17-10)

Third Quarter

- (12:52) TULA - Kai Horton 6 yd Rush (Valentino Ambrosio Kick) (Drive: 3 plays, 17 yards, 1:23; 17-17)
- (10:31) VT - Bhayshul Tuten 9 yd Rush (John Love Kick) (Drive: 5 plays, 73 yards, 2:21; VT 24-17)
- (5:28) VT - John Love 35 yd Field Goal (Drive: 6 plays, 58 yards, 3:01; VT 27-17)

Fourth Quarter

- (14:56) TULA - Valentino Ambrosio 20 yd Field Goal (Drive: 11 plays, 73 yards, 5:32; VT 27-20)
- (12:38) VT - Benji Gosnell 10 yd Pass From Kyron Drones (John Love Kick) (Drive: 5 plays, 75 yards, 2:18; VT 34-20)
- (9:33) VT - Bhayshul Tuten 12 yd Rush (John Love Kick) (Drive: 6 plays, 44 yards, 2:32; VT 41-20)

Statistics	VT	TUL
First downs	25	15
Total yards	453	252
Rush yards	362	133
Passing yards	91	119
Turnovers	2	3
Time of possession	33:06	26:54

Team	Category	Player	Statistics
Virginia Tech	Passing	Kyron Drones	13/21, 91 yards, 2 TD
Virginia Tech	Rushing	Kyron Drones	20 carries, 176 yards, TD
Virginia Tech	Receiving	Benji Gosnell	2 receptions, 21 yards, TD
Tulane	Passing	Kai Horton	13/20, 119 yards, 2 TD
Tulane	Rushing	Makhi Hughes	15 carries, 88 yards
Tulane	Receiving	Malik Washington	5 receptions, 63 yards
