= Slade Nagle =

American football coach (born 1980)

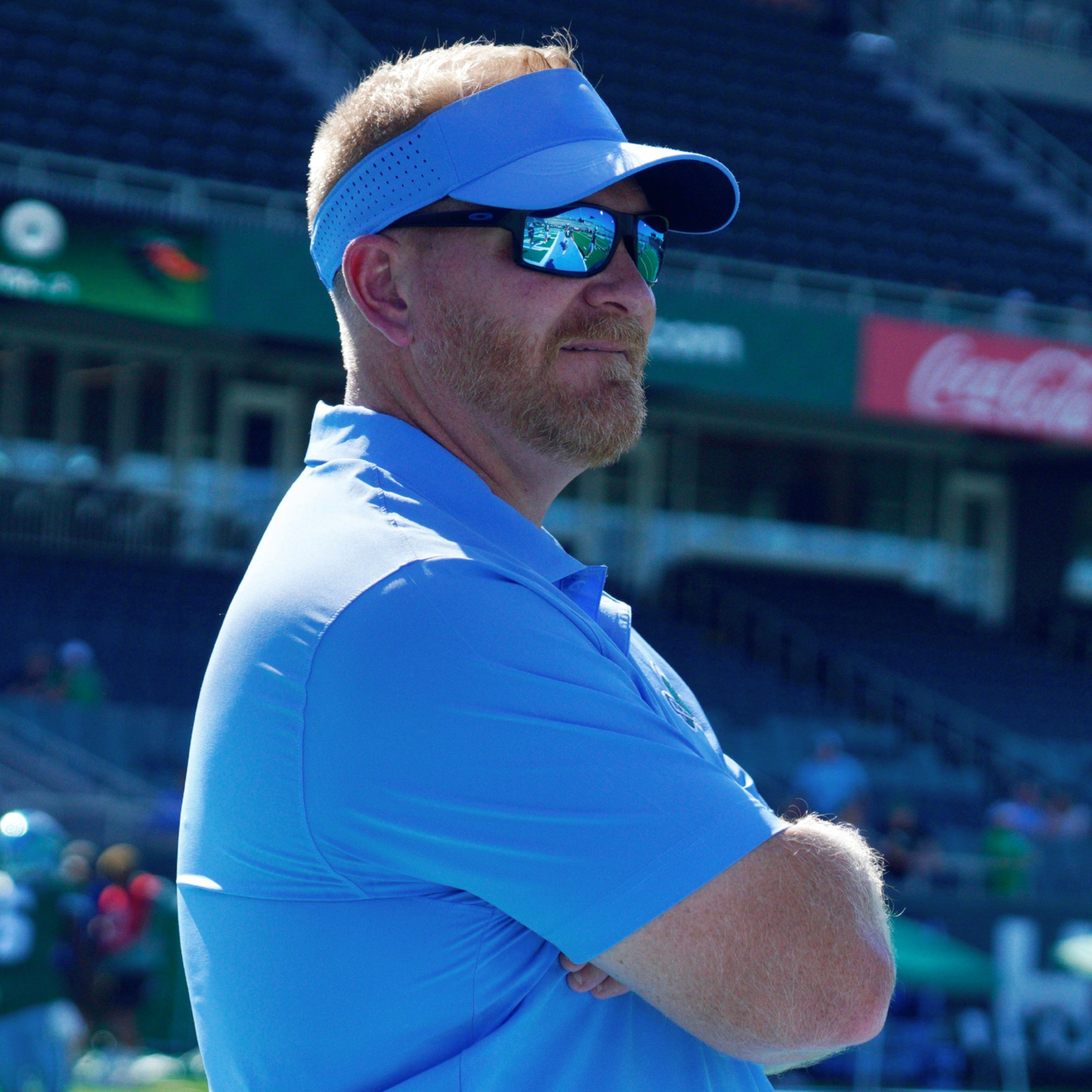

Current position
- Title: Offensive coordinator
- Team: Houston
- Conference: Big 12

Biographical details
- Born: March 23, 1980 (age 46); Baton Rouge, Louisiana, U.S.

Playing career
- 1998: Clemson
- 1999–2001: McNeese State
- Position: Quarterback

Coaching career (HC unless noted)
- 2002–2003: Northwestern State (GA)
- 2004–2005: Dodge City CC (OC/QB)
- 2006–2009: Northwestern State (OC/QB/WR/TE)
- 2009: LSU (ST)
- 2010: Texas State (co-OC/QB)
- 2011: Central Arkansas (RB/AHC)
- 2012–2015: McNeese State (RB/ST)
- 2016–2021: Tulane (TE)
- 2022: Tulane (TE/AHC)
- 2023: Tulane (OC/QB/AHC)
- 2023: Tulane (interim HC)
- 2024: LSU (ST/TE)
- 2025–present: Houston (OC)

Head coaching record
- Overall: 0–1
- Bowls: 0–1

Brandon Slade Nagle (born March 23, 1980) is an American football coach who is currently the offensive coordinator for the Houston Cougars. A longtime assistant under head coach Willie Fritz, Nagle has contributed to program turnarounds and offensive development at multiple NCAA programs, including Tulane and Houston. He previously served as the special teams coordinator and tight ends coach for the LSU Tigers and spent eight seasons at Tulane, helping the Green Wave develop into an American Athletic Conference championship program. At the FBS level, Nagle has reached or surpassed the 10-win mark in each season as a play caller, helping each team finish the regular season in the Associate Press Top 25.

== Playing career ==
A quarterback, Nagle played one game for the Clemson Tigers as a freshman, rushing for one yard on one carry. He then transferred to McNeese State University, where he played for the Cowboys from 1999 to 2001. Nagle led his team to a Southland Conference title as a senior.

== Coaching career ==
Early Years

After graduating from McNeese, Nagle served as graduate assistant coach at Northwestern State. He then served in various roles as the quarterback coach and offensive coordinator at Dodge City Community College, as the offensive coordinator and various position coaches at Northwestern State, as an analyst working with the special teams at LSU, as the co-offensive coordinator and quarterback coach at Texas State, and as the running backs/assistant head coach at Central Arkansas. After coaching at Central Arkansas, Nagle returned to his alma mater, McNeese State, to serve as the running backs and special teams coach. Nagle served in multiple roles at McNeese, including running backs coach and special teams coordinator. During the 2013 season, McNeese’s special teams unit recorded one of the most productive return seasons in school history, including a program-record 1,514 kickoff return yards and three kickoff return touchdowns. The Cowboys finished the regular season 10–1 and won the Southland Conference championship.

In 2016, Nagle was hired as a tight ends coach at Tulane before receiving the assistant head coach title in 2022.

Rebuilding Tulane

Nagle joined Willie Fritz's inaugural coaching staff at Tulane in 2016 as tight ends coach, beginning an eight-year tenure during which he helped the Green Wave rebuild its football program. Tulane finished 3-9 in 2016 and had recorded just one winning season in the previous 13 years. The program achieved its first winning season with Fritz and company in 2018, followed by consecutive bowl victories in 2018 and 2019 and a third straight bowl appearance in 2020, marking Tulane's first three-year bowl streak.

Throughout the early rebuilding period, Nagle coached Tulane's tight ends, developing payers for roles in both the passing game and team's rushing attack. Under his coaching, tight end Tyrick James became a significant receiving target, leading Tulane with 31 receptions for 429 yards and four touchdowns in 2021 before earning honorable mention All-American Athletic Conference honors in 2022. Follow tight end Will Wallace contributed primarily as a blocker, with Nagle developing the complementary roles of the two players in Tulane's offensive scheme.

Prior to the start of the 2022 season, Nagle was promoted to assistant head coach and given control of the Green Wave's offense as Tulane completed one of the largest single-season turnarounds in college football history, helping the program improve from 2–10 and secure an American Athletic Conference Championship and Cotton Bowl victory over the #8 ranked University of Southern California. Tulane's offense averaged 36 points and 204.8 rushing yards per game, ranking third in the conference in both categories, while leading the ACC in passing efficiency and fewest interceptions. The team finished ninth nationally in the final Associated Press poll, its highest ranking since 1998.

After the conclusion of the 2022 season and seven years as the Green Wave's tight end coach, Nagle was officially promoted to offensive coordinator and transitioned to coaching quarterbacks, helping the team to an 11-1 regular season record and a No. 22 AP ranking, including 8-0 in conference, and another AAC Championship Game. Tulane finished 11–3 overall, recording consecutive seasons with at least 11 victories for the first time in program history.

In his coordinator role, Nagle worked directly with quarterback Michael Pratt, who had not begun playing organized football until high school. Pratt earned American Athletic Conference Offensive Player of the Year honors in 2023. He finished his Tulane career as the program's all-time leader in passing yards (9,602) and passing touchdowns (90) and was selected by the Green Bay Packers in the seventh round of the 2024 NFL Draft. Running back Makhi Hughes also earned AAC Rookie of the Year honors after rushing for 1,378 yards.

On December 3, 2023, after head coach Willie Fritz left to take the head coaching job at the University of Houston, Nagle was named as the team's interim head coach for their appearance in the 2023 Military Bowl.

First Power 4 Coordinator Experience

In 2024, Nagle rejoined the staff at LSU as tight ends coach and special teams coordinator. Under his guidance, LSU’s tight ends were a productive part of the Tigers’ offense, which ranked among the national leaders in passing offense and first downs. Junior tight end Mason Taylor led all Southeastern Conference tight ends with 4.6 receptions per game, finished among the top Power Four tight ends in receiving yards, and set a LSU single-season record for receptions by a tight end at 55, 37 of which resulted in a first down. Taylor was later selected in second round of the 2025 NFL Draft, highlighting the development of LSU’s tight end unit during Nagle’s tenure.

During Nagle's tenure at LSU in 20204, the Tiger's special teams produced several notable performances. Freshman kickoff specialist Aeron Burrell earned second-team All-SEC and Freshman All-SEC honors, ranking third nationally in kickoff average (64.78 yards) and touchback percentage (89.2%). LSU also ranked sixth nationally in fewest kickoff returns allowed, while return specialist Zavion Thomas led the SEC with 633 kickoff return yards. Placekicker Damian Ramos converted 23 field goals, ranking eighth nationally, and earned SEC Special Teams Player of the Week honors following a four-field-goal performance against Arkansas.

Following the 2024 season, Nagle was hired as offensive coordinator at the University of Houston, rejoining Fritz and returning to his offensive roots.

Offensive turnaround at Houston

Nagle’s first season as offensive coordinator at Houston was marked by a significant improvement across nearly every major offensive category. The Cougars improved from 128th to 60th nationally in total offense and from 132nd to 55th in scoring offense while also climbing from 119th to 40th in passing efficiency and from 90th to 41st in rushing offense. The offense also improved dramatically in situational efficiency, moving from 133rd to 14th nationally in red-zone offense and from 72nd to 17th in time of possession.

Quarterback Conner Weigman produced a breakout season under Nagle's offense, throwing 25 touchdown passes and adding 11 rushing touchdowns, becoming one of only four quarterbacks nationally to record at least 25 passing touchdowns and 10 rushing touchdowns during the season. Weigman had transferred to Houston following an injury-disrupted tenure at Texas A&M. Nagle worked closely with Weigman as the quarterback adjusted to Houston's offensive system, with their preparation and developing relationship becoming part of Weigman's resurgence in 2025.

In Houston's offense, Nagle also featured his development of tight end Tanner Koziol, who played under Nagle's tight end room in 2025. Koziol earned first-team All-Big 12 honors and was named a semifinalist for the John Mackey Award. He led all FBS tight ends with 74 receptions and ranked second nationally among tight ends with 726 receiving yards. Koziol was subsequently selected by the Jacksonville Jaquars in the fifth round of the 2026 NFL Draft with the 164th overall pick, becoming the first Houston tight end drafted since 2010.

Houston’s offensive resurgence helped power a six-win improvement from the previous season and a 38–35 victory over LSU in the Texas Bowl at NRG Stadium in Houston. Weigman threw four touchdown passes, tying the Texas Bowl record, as the Cougars rallied from an early 14–0 deficit to secure the win. Houston finished with 437 yards of total offense compared to LSU’s 344 yards. The victory gave the Cougars a 10–3 record for the season and the program’s first AP ranking, at No. 22, since 2021.

Following the season's success, Nagle helped Houston assemble one of the nation's highest-ranked transfer portal classes for 2026. On3 ranked the Cougars' class sixth nationally, with 20 incoming transfers. Among the additions was former UTSA tight end Patrick Overmyer, who had earned Freshman All-American honors in 2024. The class also included offensive linemen Shadre Hurst and Anthony Boswell, wide receiver Trent Walker, and a reunion with running back Makhi Hughes.

Before the 2026 season, Houston rewarded Nagle with a contract extension and salary increase as part of head coach Willie Fritz’s staff retention plan.

== Offensive Philosophy, Scheme, and Talent ==
Nagle employs a physical, run-oriented offensive scheme designed to balance rushing and passing production while adapting to the strengths of his personnel. His approach incorporates multiple formations, packaged plays, variable tempo, and versatile tight end play. Rather than relying on a fixed system, he adjusts personally grouping and play-calling to exploit defensive match-ups.

His philosophy emphasizes complementary football, using the run game and sustained possessions to support the defense while creating opportunities for explosive plays. Nagle prioritizes ball security, third-down conversions, and red-zone efficiency, with situational flexibility determining when to emphasize the run or passing game.

Teams featuring Nagle as an offensive play-caller have also outperformed their recruiting and roster-talent rankings. Tulane’s 2022 and 2023 rosters ranked 74th and 82nd nationally, respectively, despite their historic success. At Houston, the 2025 roster ranked 66th nationally in talent, yet finished with 11 wins and a top-25 AP ranking.

== Head coaching record ==
Year	Team	Overall	Conference	Standing	Bowl/playoffs	Coaches^{#}	AP^{°}
Tulane Green Wave (American Athletic Conference) (2023)
2023	Tulane	0–1 (Note: Nagle was named interim head coach for the team's bowl game following Willie Fritz's departure to Houston.)			L Military		
Tulane:		0–1					
Total:		0–1					
