= Da'Quan Felton =

American football player (born 2001)

Profile
- Position: Wide receiver

Personal information
- Born: January 13, 2001 (age 25); Portsmouth, Virginia, U.S.
- Listed height: 6 ft 5 in (1.96 m)
- Listed weight: 213 lb (97 kg)

Career information
- High school: Churchland (Portsmouth)
- College: Norfolk State (2019–2022); Virginia Tech (2023–2024)
- NFL draft: 2025: undrafted

Career history
- New York Giants (2025); New York Jets (2026)*
- * Offseason or practice squad member only

Awards and highlights
- Second-team All-MEAC (2022)
- Stats at Pro Football Reference

Da'Quan Marquis Felton (born January 13, 2001) is an American professional football wide receiver. He played college football for the Norfolk State Spartans and for the Virginia Tech Hokies.

== Early life ==
Felton was born on January 13, 2001, in Portsmouth, Virginia. He attended Churchland High School in Portsmouth where he earned first-team All-Region 4A as a receiver in his senior year. Felton won the state championship in the 300-meter hurdles event.

== College career ==
Felton played college football for the Norfolk State Spartans from 2019 to 2022 and for the Virginia Tech Hokies from 2023 to 2024. He redshirted his first year and his second was cancelled due to the COVID-19 pandemic. Felton appeared in 23 games for Norfolk State, catching 67 passes for 1,065 yards and nine touchdowns. In his last game as a Spartan, he hauled in nine passes for 163 yards and three touchdowns against South Carolina State. He was named to the Second team All-MEAC in 2022. On December 21, 2022, Felton transferred to Virginia Tech.

Felton played and started in all 25 games for the Hokies and tallied 70 receptions, 1,027 receiving yards, ten touchdowns and ten rushing yards. In 2024, against the Miami Hurricanes, Felton appeared to catch a Hail Mary pass in the endzone, from quarterback Kyron Drones, which would have won the game for Virginia Tech, but was controversially overturned after replay review.

=== College statistics ===
Season	Team	Games		Receiving				Rushing			
Season	Team	GP	GS	Rec	Yds	Lng	TD	Att	Yds	Lng	TD
2019	Norfolk State	Redshirt									
2020	Norfolk State	Season cancelled									
2021	Norfolk State	11	6	28	492	38	2	0	0	0	0
2022	Norfolk State	11	11	39	571	90	7	0	0	0	0
2023	Virginia Tech	13	13	38	667	84	8	0	0	0	0
2024	Virginia Tech	12	12	32	360	55	2	1	10	10	0
Career		48	42	137	2,090	90	19	1	10	10	0

== Professional career ==
Pre-draft measurables
Height	Weight	Arm length	Hand span	Wingspan	40-yard dash	10-yard split	20-yard split	20-yard shuttle	Three-cone drill	Vertical jump	Broad jump	Bench press
6 ft 4 3/4 in (1.95 m)	213 lb (97 kg)	32 1/4 in (0.82 m)	9 in (0.23 m)	6 ft 7 1/8 in (2.01 m)	4.50 s	1.52 s	2.64 s	4.30 s	7.10 s	35.0 in (0.89 m)	10 ft 2 in (3.10 m)	16 reps
All values from NFL Combine/Pro Day

=== New York Giants ===
After not being selected in the 2025 NFL draft, Felton signed with the New York Giants as an undrafted free agent. He was waived on August 26 with an injury designation as part of final roster cuts and reverted to injured reserve the following day.

On April 6, 2026, Felton was released by the Giants.

=== New York Jets ===
On June 1, 2026, Felton signed with the New York Jets, but was waived two days later.
