= Valentino Ambrosio =

American football player (born 2000)

No. 43
- Position: Placekicker

Personal information
- Born: May 13, 2000 (age 26)
- Listed height: 5 ft 9 in (1.75 m)
- Listed weight: 175 lb (79 kg)

Career information
- High school: Cranford (Cranford, New Jersey)
- College: Rutgers (2020–2021); Tulane (2022–2024)
- Stats at ESPN

Valentino Ambrosio (born May 13, 2000) is an American football placekicker. He played college football for the Rutgers Scarlet Knights and finished his career with the Tulane Green Wave, where he holds the highest field goal percentage of any kicker in Tulane football history (84.2%). In the 2023 Cotton Bowl Classic where Tulane beat USC by a score of 46–45, Ambrosio made the winning kick. Following a senior season at Tulane with 21 field goals made, which led the American Conference, he was declared for the 2024 NFL draft as a kicking prospect.

== Early life ==
Ambrosio is the son of Frank and Elise Ambrosio and is from Roselle Park, New Jersey. He was born on May 13, 2000. He started playing soccer at a young age. Ambrosio attended Roselle Park High School before transferring to Cranford High School at the start of his junior year. He started playing for the Players Development Academy located in Somerset, New Jersey, then went on to play for the New York Red Bulls youth academy before going to play college soccer at Fairleigh Dickinson University. After one season at Fairleigh Dickinson, he transferred to continue his soccer career at Rutgers University.

== College career ==
Ambrosio played college soccer at Fairleigh Dickinson and Rutgers University before making the transition to kick field goals for the Scarlet Knights in 2020. Ambrosio was 21–27 in his career at Rutgers where he kicked the game-tying and game-winning field goals vs. Maryland in 2020.

After kicking for the Scarlet Knights in 2020–2021, Ambrosio transferred to Tulane University for his final 2 years of eligibility. His first season for the green wave he only missed one field goal all year converting eleven of twelve of his field goals and all 43 of his extra points. After winning the American Athletic Conference, Tulane played in the Goodyear Cotton Bowl Classic vs. the USC Trojans. Ambrosio made a kick in this game to put the Green Wave up a point with 9 seconds left in the game. Following the year, Ambrosio continued his kicking success and finished his senior season with 21 field goals made which was the most made in the American Athletic Conference for the 2023 season.

Ambrosio finished his career at Tulane with a field goal percentage of 84.2%, the highest of any placekicker in Tulane history. In his career Ambrosio has participated in three bowl games, one with Rutgers and two with Tulane. He is 1–2 in bowl games with a loss to Wake Forest in the Gator Bowl and a loss to Virginia Tech in the Military Bowl where he tied Joey Slye's record of the longest field goal in that game, 49 yards. Most notably he was a part of the win vs USC in the Cotton Bowl on January 2, 2023, where he had the kick to put the Green Wave up in a historical win for the program.

Ambrosio has finished his eligibility in college and has declared for the 2024 NFL Draft as one of the top kicking prospects in this year's draft.

== Career statistics ==
College statistics
Year	Team	GP	FGM	FGA	Pct	Long	XPM	XPA	Pct
2020	Rutgers	6	9	11	81.8%	42	15	16	93.7%
2021	Rutgers	13	12	16	75.0%	40	30	31	96.7%
2022	Tulane	9	11	12	91.6%	47	43	43	100%
2023	Tulane	14	21	26	80.8%	49	42	42	100%
Career		42	53	65	81.5%	49	130	132	98.4%
