= Kyron Drones =

American football player (born 2003)

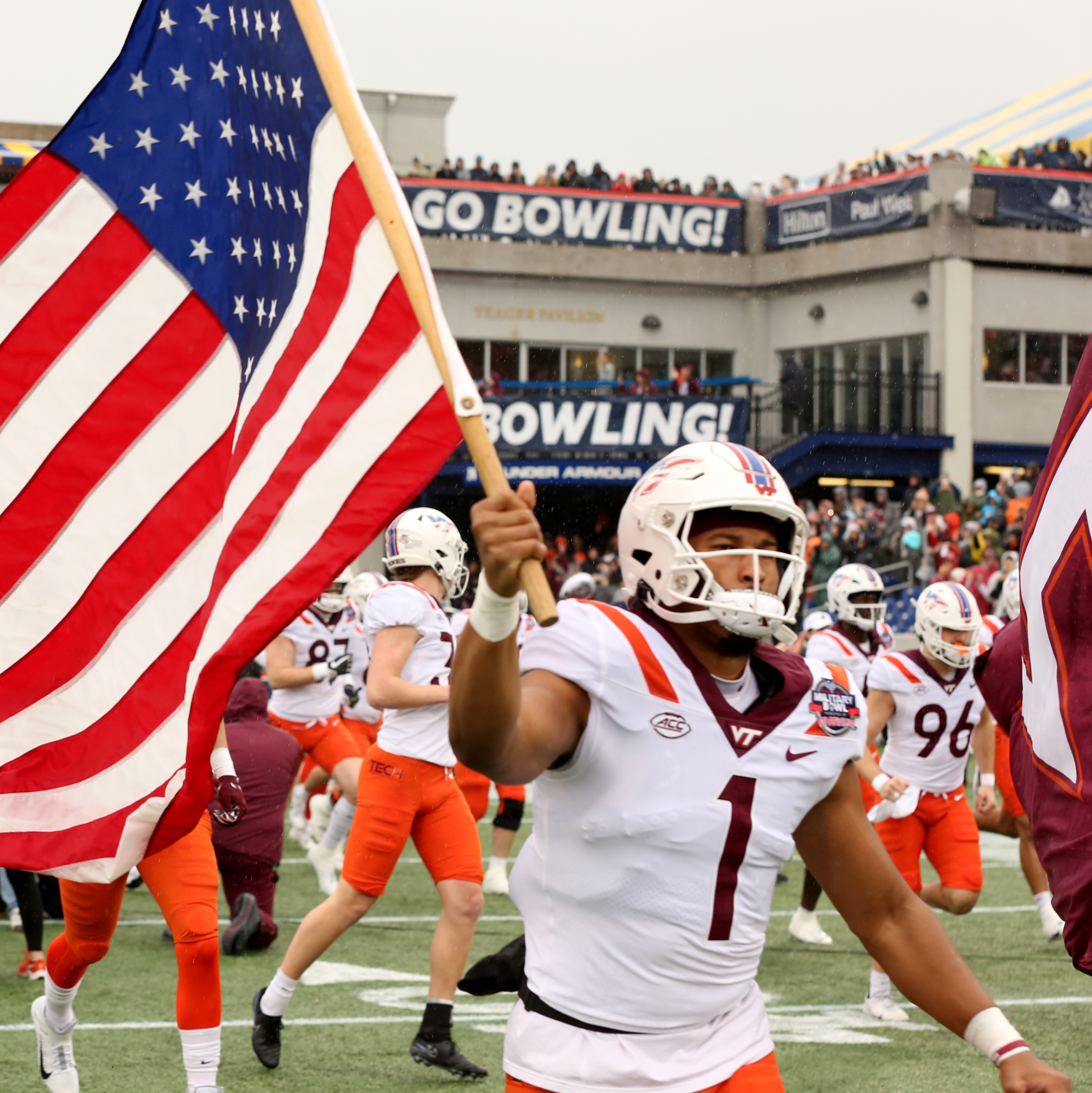
- Drones at the 2023 Military Bowl

Dallas Renegades
- Position: Running back
- Roster status: Active

Personal information
- Born: July 24, 2003 (age 23); Houston, Texas, U.S.
- Listed height: 6 ft 2 in (1.88 m)
- Listed weight: 226 lb (103 kg)

Career information
- High school: Shadow Creek (Pearland, Texas)
- College: Baylor (2021–2022); Virginia Tech (2023–2025)
- NFL draft: 2026: undrafted

Career history
- Green Bay Packers (2026)*; Dallas Renegades (2027-present)
- * Offseason or practice squad member only
- Stats at Pro Football Reference

Kyron Drones (born July 24, 2003) is an American professional football running back for the Dallas Renegades of the United Football League (UFL). He played college football for the Baylor Bears and Virginia Tech Hokies.

== Early life ==
Drones attended and played football at Shadow Creek High School, where he passed for 5,257 yards and 71 touchdowns with 17 interceptions and rushed for 1,300 yards and 23 touchdowns. Drones committed to play college football at Baylor University over other schools such as Auburn, Ole Miss, TCU, and Pittsburgh.

== College career ==
=== Baylor ===
As a freshman in 2021, Drones was redshirted and saw no in-game action. In 2022, he threw for 219 yards and a touchdown with an interception while also rushing for 49 yards and two touchdowns. After the season, Drones entered the NCAA transfer portal.

=== Virginia Tech ===
Drones transferred to Virginia Tech before the 2023 season. He started the first game of his career in week 3 of the season, completing 19 of 32 passes for 190 yards and a touchdown with an interception while also rushing 22 times for 74 yards in a loss to Rutgers. The following week, Drones again got the start, and completed 19 of 35 passing attempts for 160 yards and rushed for 75 yards and two touchdowns in a loss to Marshall.

=== College statistics ===
Season	Team	Games			Passing								Rushing			
Season	Team	GP	GS	Record	Comp	Att	Pct	Yards	Avg	TD	Int	Rate	Att	Yards	Avg	TD
2021	Baylor	2	0	0−0	0	0	0.0	0	0.0	0	0	0.0	0	0	0.0	0
2022	Baylor	5	0	0−0	14	23	60.9	219	9.5	1	1	146.5	8	49	6.1	2
2023	Virginia Tech	13	11	6−5	166	285	58.2	2,085	7.3	17	3	137.3	166	818	4.9	5
2024	Virginia Tech	9	9	5−4	136	224	60.7	1,562	7.0	10	6	128.7	98	336	3.4	6
2025	Virginia Tech	12	12	3−9	178	315	56.5	1,919	6.1	17	9	119.8	170	644	3.8	9
Career		41	32	14−18	494	847	58.3	5,785	6.8	45	19	128.7	442	1,847	4.2	22

== Professional career ==
Pre-draft measurables
Height	Weight	Arm length	Hand span	Wingspan	40-yard dash	10-yard split	20-yard split	20-yard shuttle	Vertical jump	Broad jump
6 ft 1 5/8 in (1.87 m)	226 lb (103 kg)	32 3/4 in (0.83 m)	9 3/4 in (0.25 m)	6 ft 7 3/4 in (2.03 m)	4.66 s	1.60 s	2.52 s	4.27 s	33.0 in (0.84 m)	10 ft 0 in (3.05 m)
All values from Pro Day

Drones was signed as an undrafted free agent by the Green Bay Packers after the conclusion of the 2026 NFL draft. He was released by the Packers on August 15.

== Personal life ==
Drones' older maternal cousin is quarterback Cam Ward, who was selected with the first overall pick of the 2025 NFL draft.
