= Alex Chappell =

American journalist (born 1988)

- Born: Alex Corddry; October 10, 1988 (age 37)
- Education: University of Alabama
- Occupations: Sports journalist, sideline reporter
- Employer(s): Mid-Atlantic Sports Network; ESPN; SEC Network
- Spouse: Scott Chappell (m. 2019)

Alex Chappell (née Corddry; born October 10, 1988) is an American journalist for Mid-Atlantic Sports Network (MASN) covering the Washington Nationals. She also works as a sideline reporter for ESPN and for SEC Network for college football coverage.

== Early life and education ==
Chappell grew up in Bethesda, Maryland. Her father, Phillip Corddry, was a left-handed pitcher for the University of Maryland and spent the 1969 through 1972 seasons with the Boston Red Sox organization. She graduated from Walt Whitman High School and the University of Alabama, and while in college she interned at WJLA in Washington, D.C.

Chappell became a Washington Nationals fan in 2005, when the team moved to Washington, D.C., from Montreal – where they had played as the Montreal Expos from 1969 through 2004 – and she admired former MASN field reporters Amber Theoharis and Kristina Akra (now Kristina Fitzpatrick) during Baltimore Orioles and Washington Nationals broadcasts, respectively.

== Career ==
After graduation from the University of Alabama, Chappell worked as a sports reporter for then-CBS affiliate WIAT in Birmingham, Alabama. From there she worked briefly as a reporter of Redskins Nation for NBC Sports Washington, as a sports reporter for WHDH in Boston, Massachusetts, and as a sideline reporter for ESPN for College Football. She worked for TBS during the 2019 Major League Baseball postseason, and was the pre- and post-game reporter for Bally Sports Florida covering the Tampa Bay Rays during the 2017 season. She became MASN's on-field reporter for broadcasts of Washington Nationals games in 2019 and 2020. When MASN dropped the field reporter position from its coverage of Nationals games beginning in 2021, the Nationals hired her as a substitute anchor for their pregame and postgame shows.

== Personal life ==
Chappell married Scott Chappell, an attorney, in January 2019. Actors and former Daily Show Correspondents Rob Corddry and Nate Corddry are her cousins. On May 31, 2022, Chappell announced via Instagram that she is expecting a baby girl due in November.
