= Makhi Hughes =

American football player

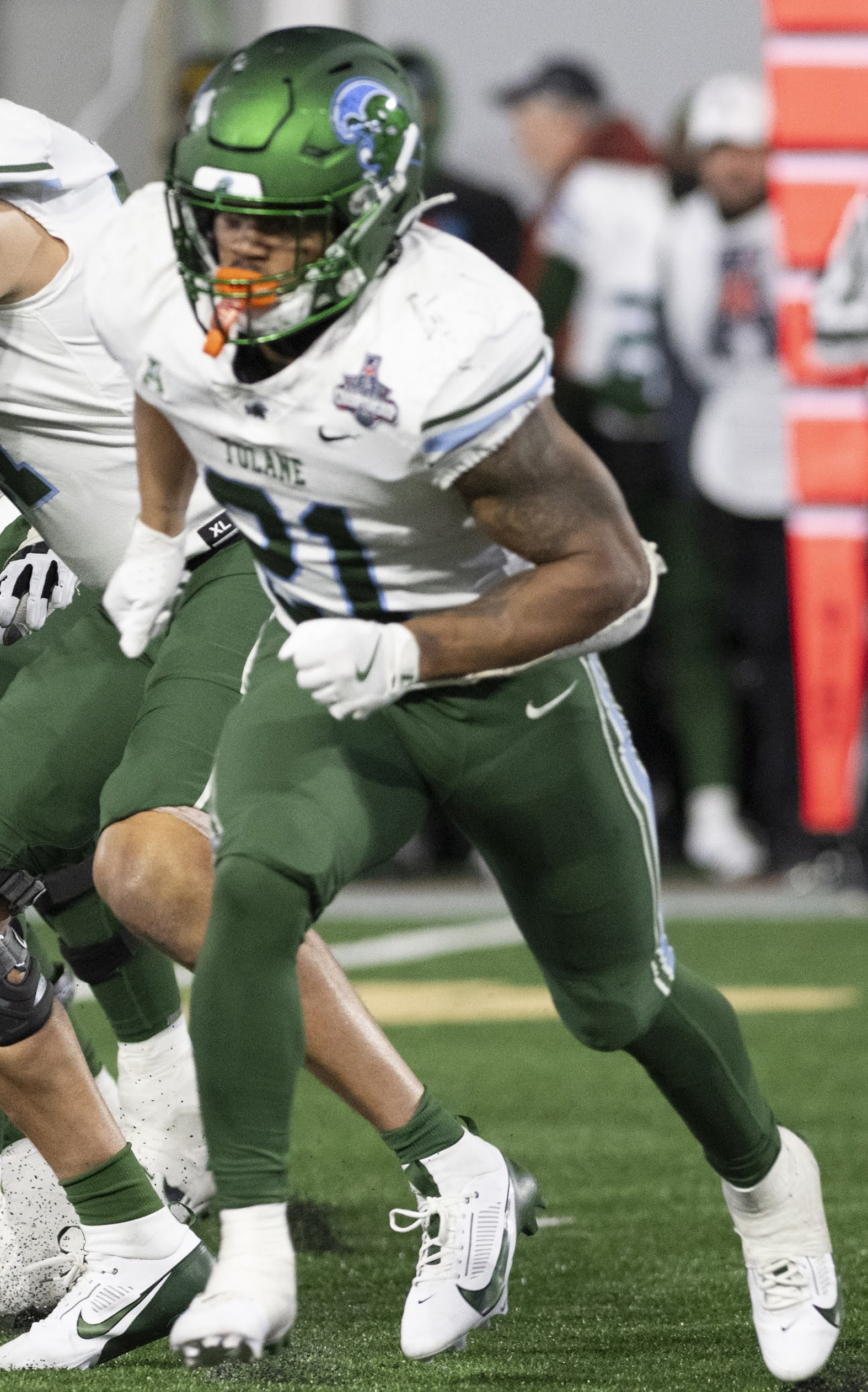
- Hughes with Tulane during the 2024 American Athletic Conference Football Championship Game

No. 21 – Houston Cougars
- Position: Running back
- Class: Redshirt Senior

Personal information
- Listed height: 6 ft 0 in (1.83 m)
- Listed weight: 210 lb (95 kg)

Career information
- High school: Huffman (Birmingham, Alabama)
- College: Tulane (2022–2024); Oregon (2025); Houston (2026–present)

Awards and highlights
- AAC Rookie of the Year (2023); 2× First-team All-AAC (2023, 2024)
- Stats at ESPN

Makhi Amir Hughes is an American college football running back for the Houston Cougars. He previously played for the Tulane Green Wave and the Oregon Ducks.

== Early life ==
Hughes attended Huffman High School in Birmingham, Alabama. During his high school career he had over 2,700 rushing yards and 29 touchdowns. He originally committed to play college football at Appalachian State University but flipped his commitment to Tulane University.

== College career ==
=== Tulane ===
Hughes sat out during his freshman season in 2022 due to an injury and was redshirted. He entered his redshirt freshman year at Tulane in 2023 as a backup before earning his first start against Memphis. He kept the starting job for the rest of the season and became the first player in school history to rush for over 1,000 yards as a freshman. He was named a freshman All-American and the American Athletic Conference (AAC) rookie of the year.

On December 27, 2024, Hughes announced that he would enter the transfer portal.

=== Oregon ===
On January 7, 2025, Hughes announced that he would transfer to the University of Oregon. After sparsely playing in four games for the Ducks, he requested to redshirt for the rest of the season, which was granted by the team. On January 3, 2026, Hughes entered the transfer portal.

=== Houston ===
On January 4, 2026, Hughes committed to the University of Houston, reuniting him with Willie Fritz, his former head coach at Tulane from 2022 to 2023.

=== College statistics ===
Year	Team	Games		Rushing				Receiving			
Year	Team	GP	GS	Att	Yards	Avg	TD	Rec	Yards	Avg	TD
2022	Tulane	Redshirt (redshirt)									
2023	Tulane	14	9	258	1,378	5.3	7	11	67	6.1	0
2024	Tulane	14	14	265	1,401	5.3	15	19	176	9.3	2
2025	Oregon	4	0	17	70	4.1	0	2	24	12.0	0
2026	Houston	11	11	163	870	5.3	8	13	119	9.2	0
Career		43	34	703	3,719	5.3	30	45	386	8.6	2

== Personal life ==
Hughes is the half-brother of Oregon cornerback, Na'eem Offord.
