= 2023 Rice Owls football team =

American college football season

2023 Rice Owls football

First Responder Bowl, L 21–45 vs. Texas State
- Conference: American Athletic Conference
- Record: 6–7 (4–4 AAC)
- Head coach: Mike Bloomgren (6th season)
- Offensive coordinator: Marques Tuiasosopo (3rd season)
- Offensive scheme: Pro-style
- Defensive coordinator: Brian Smith (6th season)
- Base defense: Multiple 3–4
- Home stadium: Rice Stadium

2023 American Athletic Conference football standings
	Conf.			Overall
Team	W		L	W		L
No. 22 SMU y$	8	–	0	11	–	3
Tulane y	8	–	0	11	–	3
UTSA	7	–	1	9	–	4
Memphis	6	–	2	10	–	3
South Florida	4	–	4	7	–	6
Rice	4	–	4	6	–	7
Navy	4	–	4	5	–	7
North Texas	3	–	5	5	–	7
UAB	3	–	5	4	–	8
Florida Atlantic	3	–	5	4	–	8
Charlotte	2	–	6	3	–	9
Tulsa	2	–	6	4	–	8
Temple	1	–	7	3	–	9
East Carolina	1	–	7	2	–	10
Championship: SMU 26, Tulane 14
$ – Conference champion; y – Championship game participant; Rankings from AP Poll

The 2023 Rice Owls football team represented Rice University and competed in their first season as members of the American Athletic Conference (AAC) during the 2023 NCAA Division I FBS football season. They were led by head coach Mike Bloomgren, who was coaching his sixth season with the team. The Owls played their home games at the Rice Stadium in Houston, Texas. The Rice Owls football team drew an average home attendance of 20,542 in 2023.

== Preseason ==
=== Media poll ===
The American Athletic Conference preseason poll was released on July 25. The Owls were predicted to finish twelfth in the conference.

Media poll
Predicted finish	Team	Votes (1st place)
1	Tulane	457 (20)
2	UTSA	440 (9)
3	SMU	397 (3)
4	Memphis	362 (1)
5	Florida Atlantic	312
6	East Carolina	303
7	North Texas	261
8	UAB	209 (1)
9	Navy	199
10	Temple	182
11	Tulsa	160
12	Rice	138
13	South Florida	86
14	Charlotte	64

== Schedule ==
Rice and the American Athletic Conference (AAC) announced the 2023 football schedule on February 21, 2023.

Date	Time	Opponent	Site	TV	Result	Attendance
September 2	2:30 p.m.	at No. 11 Texas*	Darrell K Royal–Texas Memorial Stadium; Austin, TX (rivalry)	Fox	L 10–37	98,017
September 9	6:00 p.m.	Houston*	Rice Stadium; Houston, TX (rivalry)	NFLN	W 43–41 ^{2OT}	23,425
September 16	6:00 p.m.	Texas Southern*	Rice Stadium; Houston, TX	ESPN+	W 59–7	18,103
September 23	3:00 p.m.	at South Florida	Raymond James Stadium; Tampa, FL	ESPNU	L 29–42	29,141
September 30	6:00 p.m.	East Carolina	Rice Stadium; Houston, TX	ESPN+	W 24–17	19,598
October 7	4:00 p.m.	UConn*	Rice Stadium; Houston, TX	ESPN+	L 31–38	21,207
October 19	6:00 p.m.	at Tulsa	H. A. Chapman Stadium; Tulsa, OK	ESPN2	W 42–10	18,527
October 28	3:00 p.m.	No. 22 Tulane	Rice Stadium; Houston, TX	ESPN2	L 28–30	20,436
November 4	6:30 p.m.	SMU^{†}	Rice Stadium; Houston, TX (rivalry)	ESPNU	L 31–36	21,632
November 11	6:30 p.m.	at UTSA	Alamodome; San Antonio, TX	ESPNU	L 14–34	28,245
November 18	1:00 p.m.	at Charlotte	Jerry Richardson Stadium; Charlotte, NC	ESPN+	W 28–7	9,385
November 25	12:00 p.m.	Florida Atlantic	Rice Stadium; Houston, TX	ESPN+	W 24–21	19,393
December 26	4:30 p.m.	vs. Texas State*	Gerald J. Ford Stadium; University Park, TX (First Responder Bowl)	ESPN	L 21–45	26,542
*Non-conference game; ^{†}Homecoming; Rankings from AP Poll (and CFP Rankings, after November 1) released prior to game; All times are in Central time

== Game summaries ==
=== At No. 11 Texas ===
Rice Owls at No. 11 Texas Longhorns – Game summary

Quarter	1	2	3	4	Total
Owls	3	0	0	7	10
No. 11 Longhorns	7	9	21	0	37

at Darrell K Royal–Texas Memorial Stadium, Austin, Texas

- Date: September 2
- Game time: 2:00 p.m. CDT
- Game weather: Sunny, 99 °F (37 °C)
- Game attendance: 98,017
- Referee: Tutashinda Salaam
- TV announcers (Fox): Jason Benetti, Brock Huard, and Allison Williams
- Box score, Recap

Game information
First quarter
- RICE – Tim Horn 43-yard field goal, 10:07. Owls 3–0. Drive: 6 plays, 8 yards, 2:53.
- TEX – Jonathon Brooks 37-yard pass from Quinn Ewers (Bert Auburn kick), 7:27. Longhorns 7–3. Drive: 6 plays, 75 yards, 2:40.

Second quarter

- TEX – Bert Auburn 27-yard field goal, 12:59. Longhorns 10–3. Drive: 9 plays, 50 yards, 3:41.
- TEX – Bert Auburn 46-yard field goal, 7:51. Longhorns 13–3. Drive: 7 plays, 36 yards, 2:02.
- TEX – Bert Auburn 49-yard field goal, 0:00. Longhorns 16–3. Drive: 16 plays, 66 yards, 4:25.

Third quarter

- TEX – Adonai Mitchell 9-yard pass from Quinn Ewers (Bert Auburn kick), 9:37. Longhorns 23–3. Drive: 8 plays, 62 yards, 3:40.
- TEX – Ja'Tavion Sanders 44-yard pass from Quinn Ewers (Bert Auburn kick), 5:33. Longhorns 30–3. Drive: 1 play, 44 yards, 0:08.
- TEX – Quinn Ewers 1-yard run (Bert Auburn kick), 0:57. Longhorns 37–3. Drive: 9 plays, 54 yards, 3:35.

Fourth quarter

- RICE – Luke McCaffrey 15-yard pass from JT Daniels (Tim Horn kick), 3:04. Longhorns 37–10. Drive: 14 plays, 62 yards, 9:24.

Statistics	RICE	TEX
First downs	8	24
Total yards	176	458
Rushing yards	27	158
Passing yards	149	300
Turnovers	3	0
Time of possession	28:24	31:36

Team	Category	Player	Statistics
Rice	Passing	JT Daniels	14/26, 149 yards, TD, 2 INT
Rice	Rushing	Dean Connors	8 rushes, 23 yards
Rice	Receiving	Braylen Walker	2 receptions, 47 yards
Texas	Passing	Quinn Ewers	19/30, 260 yards, 3 TD
Texas	Rushing	Jaydon Blue	10 rushes, 55 yards
Texas	Receiving	Xavier Worthy	7 receptions, 90 yards

=== Houston ===
Houston Cougars at Rice Owls – Game summary

Quarter	1	2	3	4	OT	2OT	Total
Cougars	0	7	0	21	7	6	41
Owls	21	7	0	0	7	8	43

at Rice Stadium, Houston, Texas

- Date: September 9
- Game time: 6:00 p.m. CDT
- Game weather: Sunny, 96 °F (36 °C)
- Game attendance: 23,425
- Referee: Derek Anderson
- TV announcers (NFLN): Doug Sherman and Tyoka Jackson
- Box score, Recap

Game information
First quarter
- RICE – Luke McCaffrey 10-yard pass from JT Daniels (Tim Horn kick), 10:11. Owls 7–0. Drive: 10 plays, 78 yards, 4:44.
- RICE – Daelen Alexander 1-yard run (Tim Horn kick), 4:17. Owls 14–0. Drive: 7 plays, 39 yards, 4:08.
- RICE – Luke McCaffrey 32-yard pass from JT Daniels (Tim Horn kick), 3:00. Owls 21–0. Drive: 3 plays, 69 yards, 0:50.

Second quarter

- RICE – Braylen Walker 15-yard pass from JT Daniels (Tim Horn kick), 8:32. Owls 28–0. Drive: 11 plays, 92 yards, 6:14.
- HOU – Matthew Golden 10-yard pass from Donovan Smith (Jack Martin kick), 2:42. Owls 28–7. Drive: 11 plays, 74 yards, 5:45.

Third quarter

- No scoring plays

Fourth quarter

- HOU – Donovan Smith 1-yard run (Jack Martin kick), 14:05. Owls 28–14. Drive: 6 plays, 64 yards, 1:24.
- HOU – Stacy Sneed 14-yard run (Jack Martin kick), 3:46. Owls 28–21. Drive: 6 plays, 71 yards, 2:04.
- HOU – Donovan Smith 1-yard run (Jack Martin kick), 0:15. Tied 28–28. Drive: 8 plays, 40 yards, 2:34.

Overtime

- HOU – Matthew Golden 2-yard pass from Donovan Smith (Jack Martin kick). Cougars 35–28. Drive: 5 plays, 25 yards.
- RICE – Daelen Alexander 3-yard run (Tim Horn kick). Tied 35–35. Drive: 5 plays, 25 yards.

Second overtime

- RICE – Daelen Alexander 1-yard run (Daelen Alexander run). Owls 43–35. Drive: 4 plays, 25 yards.
- HOU – Donovan Smith 2-yard run (pass failed). Owls 43–41. Drive: 5 plays, 25 yards.

Statistics	HOU	RICE
First downs	27	24
Total yards	443	470
Rushing yards	183	69
Passing yards	260	401
Turnovers	1	2
Time of possession	28:10	31:50

Team	Category	Player	Statistics
Houston	Passing	Donovan Smith	24/42, 260 yards, 2 TD, INT
Houston	Rushing	Tony Mathis Jr.	8 rushes, 60 yards
Houston	Receiving	Samuel Brown	9 receptions, 138 yards
Rice	Passing	JT Daniels	28/42, 401 yards, 3 TD, INT
Rice	Rushing	Dean Connors	8 rushes, 48 yards
Rice	Receiving	Luke McCaffrey	7 receptions, 99 yards, 2 TD

=== Texas Southern ===
Texas Southern Tigers at Rice Owls – Game summary

Quarter	1	2	3	4	Total
Tigers	0	7	0	0	7
Owls	28	14	10	7	59

at Rice Stadium, Houston, Texas

- Date: September 16
- Game time: 6:00 p.m. CDT
- Game weather: Cloudy, 78 °F (26 °C)
- Game attendance: 18,103
- Referee: Steven Anderson
- TV announcers (ESPN+): Richard Cross and Taylor McHargue
- Box score, Recap

Game information
First quarter
- RICE – Daelen Alexander 1-yard run (Tim Horn kick), 13:04. Owls 7–0. Drive: 4 plays, 16 yards, 1:47.
- RICE – Braylen Walker 35-yard pass from JT Daniels (Tim Horn kick), 11:06. Owls 14–0. Drive: 3 plays, 32 yards, 0:51.
- RICE – Kobie Campbell 70-yard pass from JT Daniels (Tim Horn kick), 9:29. Owls 21–0. Drive: 1 play, 70 yards, 0:12.
- RICE – Jack Bradley 1-yard run (Tim Horn kick), 5:55. Owls 28–0. Drive: 5 plays, 59 yards, 2:08.

Second quarter

- RICE – Dean Connors 3-yard run (Tim Horn kick), 9:37. Owls 35–0. Drive: 5 plays, 33 yards, 2:58.
- TXSO – Jyrin Johnson 15-yard pass from Jace Wilson (Curtis Falkenburg kick), 4:17. Owls 35–7. Drive: 5 plays, 76 yards, 1:48.
- RICE – Luke McCaffrey 36-yard pass from JT Daniels (Tim Horn kick), 1:12. Owls 42–7. Drive: 7 plays, 72 yards, 3:05.

Third quarter

- RICE – Tim Horn 48-yard field goal, 11:02. Owls 45–7. Drive: 9 plays, 47 yards, 3:50.
- RICE – Daelen Alexander 1-yard run (Tim Horn kick), 6:31. Owls 52–7. Drive: 6 plays, 73 yards, 3:38.

Fourth quarter

- RICE – Christian Francisco 4-yard run (Tim Horn kick), 3:13. Owls 59–7. Drive: 2 plays, 13 yards, 0:45.

Statistics	TXSO	RICE
First downs	10	23
Total yards	185	485
Rushing yards	81	231
Passing yards	104	254
Turnovers	2	0
Time of possession	24:26	35:34

Team	Category	Player	Statistics
Texas Southern	Passing	Jace Wilson	9/19, 104 yards, TD
Texas Southern	Rushing	Ladarius Owens	11 rushes, 48 yards
Texas Southern	Receiving	Jace Johnson	4 receptions, 49 yards, TD
Rice	Passing	JT Daniels	11/17, 255 yards, 4 TD
Rice	Rushing	Dean Connors	8 rushes, 66 yards, TD
Rice	Receiving	Kobie Campbell	1 reception, 70 yards, TD

=== At South Florida ===
Rice Owls at South Florida Bulls – Game summary

Quarter	1	2	3	4	Total
Owls	7	7	7	8	29
Bulls	3	10	14	15	42

at Raymond James Stadium, Tampa, Florida

- Date: September 23
- Game time: 3:00 p.m. CDT/4:00 p.m. EDT
- Game weather: Sunny, 88 °F (31 °C)
- Game attendance: 29,141
- Referee: Edwin Lee
- TV announcers (ESPNU): Jay Alter and Rene Ingoglia
- Box score, Recap

Game information
First quarter
- USF – John Cannon 31-yard field goal, 7:22. Bulls 3–0. Drive: 12 plays, 62 yards, 4:49.
- RICE – Daelen Alexander 3-yard pass from JT Daniels (Tim Horn kick), 2:28. Owls 7–3. Drive: 9 plays, 75 yards, 4:54.

Second quarter

- USF – John Cannon 40-yard field goal, 14:07. Owls 7–6. Drive: 8 plays, 53 yards, 3:21.
- USF – K'Wan Powell 26-yard run (John Cannon kick), 1:35. Bulls 13–7. Drive: 6 plays, 78 yards, 2:35.
- RICE – Dean Connors 2-yard pass from JT Daniels (Tim Horn kick), 0:15. Owls 14–13. Drive: 10 plays, 70 yards, 1:14.

Third quarter

- USF – Byrum Brown 1-yard run (John Cannon kick), 13:54. Bulls 20–14. Drive: 4 plays, 75 yards, 1:06.
- RICE – Dean Connors 80-yard pass from JT Daniels (Tim Horn kick), 7:53. Owls 21–20. Drive: 1 play, 80 yards, 0:11.
- USF – Naiem Simmons 49-yard pass from Byrum Brown (John Cannon kick), 2:07. Bulls 27–21. Drive: 2 plays, 55 yards, 0:25.

Fourth quarter

- USF – Sean Atkins 8-yard pass from Byrum Brown (John Cannon kick), 13:22. Bulls 34–21. Drive: 5 plays, 75 yards, 1:38.
- USF – Nay'Quan Wright 1-yard run (Sean Atkins pass to Byrum Brown), 8:52. Bulls 42–21. Drive: 9 plays, 57 yards, 2:57.
- RICE – Rawson MacNeil 9-yard pass from AJ Padgett (AJ Padgett pass to Luke McCaffrey), 3:46. Bulls 42–29. Drive: 10 plays, 79 yards, 4:59.

Statistics	RICE	USF
First downs	19	25
Total yards	492	597
Rushing yards	1	162
Passing yards	491	435
Turnovers	0	1
Time of possession	32:27	27:33

Team	Category	Player	Statistics
Rice	Passing	JT Daniels	27/40, 432 yards, 3 TD
Rice	Rushing	Juma Otoviano	4 rushes, 12 yards
Rice	Receiving	Luke McCaffrey	9 receptions, 199 yards
South Florida	Passing	Byrum Brown	22/29, 435 yards, 2 TD
South Florida	Rushing	Byrum Brown	14 rushes, 82 yards, TD
South Florida	Receiving	Naiem Simmons	8 receptions, 272 yards, TD

=== East Carolina ===
East Carolina Pirates at Rice Owls – Game summary

Quarter	1	2	3	4	Total
Pirates	3	6	0	8	17
Owls	3	7	7	7	24

at Rice Stadium, Houston, Texas

- Date: September 30
- Game time: 6:00 p.m. CDT
- Game weather: Sunny • Temperature: 91 °F (33 °C) • Wind: SE at 12 miles per hour (19 km/h)
- Game attendance: 19,598
- Referee: Nate Black
- TV announcers (ESPN+): Richard Cross (play-by-play), Taylor McHargue (analyst), Smacker Miles (sideline reporter)
- Box score, Recap

Game information
First quarter
- ECU – Andrew Conrad 35-yard field goal, 7:17. Pirates 3–0. Drive: 14 plays, 56 yards, 6:16.
- RICE – Tim Horn 41-yard field goal, 2:34. Tied 3–3. Drive: 5 plays, 24 yards, 1:50.

Second quarter

- RICE – Rawson MacNeil 4-yard pass from JT Daniels (Tim Horn kick), 11:32. Owls 10–3. Drive: 7 plays, 59 yards, 3:28.
- ECU – Andrew Conrad 27-yard field goal, 2:51. Owls 10–6. Drive: 10 plays, 44 yards, 4:43.
- ECU – Andrew Conrad 38-yard field goal, 0:13. Owls 10–9. Drive: 8 plays, 39 yards, 1:20.

Third quarter

- RICE – Chase Jenkins 4-yard run (Tim Horn kick), 0:49. Owls 17–9. Drive: 7 plays, 53 yards, 4:10.

Fourth quarter

- ECU – Rahjai Harris 1-yard run (Alex Flinn pass to Chase Sowell), 8:24. Tied 17–17. Drive: 17 plays, 80 yards, 7:19.
- RICE – Landon Ransom-Goelz 44-yard pass from JT Daniels (Tim Horn kick), 6:24. Owls 24–17. Drive: 4 plays, 75 yards, 2:00.

Statistics	ECU	RICE
First downs	25	14
Total yards	391	277
Rushing yards	145	37
Passing yards	246	240
Turnovers	1	1
Time of possession	34:58	25:02

Team	Category	Player	Statistics
East Carolina	Passing	Alex Flinn	21/44, 246 yards, INT
East Carolina	Rushing	Javious Bond	7 rushes, 72 yards
East Carolina	Receiving	Chase Sowell	7 receptions, 88 yards
Rice	Passing	JT Daniels	18/32, 232 yards, 2 TD, INT
Rice	Rushing	Chase Jenkins	4 rushes, 27 yards, TD
Rice	Receiving	Landon Ransom-Goelz	2 receptions, 54 yards, TD

=== UConn ===
UConn Huskies at Rice Owls – Game summary

Quarter	1	2	3	4	Total
Huskies	0	20	8	10	38
Owls	14	0	7	10	31

at Rice Stadium, Houston, Texas

- Date: October 7
- Game time: 4:00 p.m. CDT
- Game weather: Sunny, 75 °F (24 °C)
- Game attendance: 21,207
- Referee: Kevin Randall
- TV announcers (ESPN+): Shawn Kenney, LaDarrin McLane, and Smacker Miles
- Box score, Recap

Game information
First quarter
- RICE – Juma Otoviano 24-yard run (Tim Horn kick), 6:53. Owls 7–0. Drive: 6 plays, 75 yards, 3:21.
- RICE – Juma Otoviano 7-yard run (Tim Horn kick), 0:33. Owls 14–0. Drive: 8 plays, 78 yards, 4:36.

Second quarter

- CONN – Jelani Stafford 1-yard run (kick blocked), 10:49. Owls 14–6. Drive: 2 plays, 2 yards, 0:44.
- CONN – Jackson Mitchell 50-yard fumble return (Joe McFadden kick), 9:54. Owls 14–13.
- CONN – Cameron Ross 41-yard pass from Ta'Quan Roberson (Joe McFadden kick), 3:48. Huskies 20–14. Drive: 7 plays, 67 yards, 4:23.

Third quarter

- CONN – Jelani Stafford 1-yard run (Ta'Quan Roberson pass to Justin Joly), 9:52. Huskies 28–14. Drive: 7 plays, 41 yards, 3:34.
- RICE – Luke McCaffrey 4-yard pass from JT Daniels (Tim Horn kick), 2:00. Huskies 28–21. Drive: 14 plays, 80 yards, 7:45.

Fourth quarter

- CONN – Joe McFadden 47-yard field goal, 14:02. Huskies 31–21. Drive: 7 plays, 46 yards, 2:58.
- RICE – Luke McCaffrey 30-yard pass from JT Daniels (Tim Horn kick), 6:56. Huskies 31–28. Drive: 5 plays, 80 yards, 2:22.
- CONN – Justin Joly 59-yard pass from Ta'Quan Roberson (Joe McFadden kick), 5:06. Huskies 38–28. Drive: 3 plays, 76 yards, 1:43.
- RICE – Tim Horn 23-yard field goal, 0:40. Huskies 38–31. Drive: 8 plays, 60 yards, 1:30.

Statistics	CONN	RICE
First downs	12	26
Total yards	319	474
Rushing yards	104	112
Passing yards	215	362
Turnovers	0	4
Time of possession	29:03	30:57

Team	Category	Player	Statistics
UConn	Passing	Ta'Quan Roberson	15/19, 215 yards, 2 TD
UConn	Rushing	Victor Rosa	18 rushes, 89 yards
UConn	Receiving	Justin Joly	7 receptions, 96 yards, TD
Rice	Passing	JT Daniels	33/49, 362 yards, 2 TD, INT
Rice	Rushing	Juma Otoviano	6 rushes, 51 yards, 2 TD
Rice	Receiving	Luke McCaffrey	7 receptions, 100 yards, 2 TD

=== At Tulsa ===
Rice Owls at Tulsa Golden Hurricane – Game summary

Quarter	1	2	3	4	Total
Owls	14	7	14	7	42
Golden Hurricane	0	10	0	0	10

at H. A. Chapman Stadium, Tulsa, Oklahoma

- Date: October 19
- Game time: 6:00 p.m. CDT
- Game weather: Clear, 82 °F (28 °C)
- Game attendance: 18,527
- Referee: Darryl DeBerry
- TV announcers (ESPN2): Jay Alter, Rene Ingoglia, and Lericia Harris
- Box score, Recap

Game information
First quarter
- RICE – Dean Connors 54-yard run (Tim Horn kick), 12:37. Owls 7–0. Drive: 2 plays, 70 yards, 0:46.
- RICE – Luke McCaffrey 21-yard pass from JT Daniels (Tim Horn kick), 2:42. Owls 14–0. Drive: 2 plays, 53 yards, 0:55.

Second quarter

- TLSA – Chase Meyer 45-yard field goal, 5:45. Owls 14–3. Drive: 5 plays, 21 yards, 1:52.
- TLSA – Kamdyn Benjamin 30-yard pass from Cardell Williams (Chase Meyer kick), 1:14. Owls 14–10. Drive: 4 plays, 69 yards, 1:20.
- RICE – Landon Ransom-Goelz 17-yard pass from JT Daniels (Tim Horn kick), 0:33. Owls 21–10. Drive: 6 plays, 74 yards, 0:36.

Third quarter

- RICE – JT Daniels 8-yard run (Tim Horn kick), 9:47. Owls 28–10. Drive: 6 plays, 75 yards, 3:28.
- RICE – Dean Connors 2-yard run (Tim Horn kick), 0:23. Owls 35–10. Drive: 13 plays, 91 yards, 8:05.

Fourth quarter

- RICE – Dean Connors 10-yard run (Tim Horn kick), 2:58. Owls 42–10. Drive: 14 plays, 96 yards, 9:56.

Statistics	RICE	TLSA
First downs	24	14
Total yards	512	294
Rushing yards	170	156
Passing yards	342	138
Turnovers	0	3
Time of possession	33:48	26:12

Team	Category	Player	Statistics
Rice	Passing	JT Daniels	24/37, 342 yards, 2 TD
Rice	Rushing	Dean Connors	9 rushes, 120 yards, 3 TD
Rice	Receiving	Luke McCaffrey	6 receptions, 99 yards, TD
Tulsa	Passing	Cardell Williams	7/14, 101 yards, TD
Tulsa	Rushing	Braylon Braxton	12 rushes, 89 yards
Tulsa	Receiving	Kamdyn Benjamin	3 receptions, 48 yards, TD

=== No. 22 Tulane ===
No. 22 Tulane Green Wave at Rice Owls – Game summary

Quarter	1	2	3	4	Total
No. 22 Green Wave	10	17	0	3	30
Owls	7	0	14	7	28

at Rice Stadium, Houston, Texas

- Date: October 28
- Game time: 3:00 p.m. CDT
- Game weather: Cloudy • Temperature: 86 °F (30 °C) • Wind: SE 14 mph
- Game attendance: 20,436
- Referee: Edwin Lee
- TV announcers (ESPN2): Drew Carter (play-by-play), Brock Osweiler (analyst), Kayla Burton (sideline)
- Box score, Recap

Game information
First quarter
- TULN – Valentino Ambrosio 44-yard field goal, 12:57. Green Wave 3–0. Drive: 5 plays, 49 yards, 2:03.
- TULN – Yulkieth Brown 26-yard pass from Michael Pratt (Valentino Ambrosio kick), 9:23. Green Wave 10–0. Drive: 4 plays, 78 yards, 1:49.
- RICE – Juma Otoviano 5-yard run (Tim Horn kick), 5:26. Green Wave 10–7. Drive: 7 plays, 82 yards, 3:50.

Second quarter

- TULN – Michael Pratt 1-yard run (Valentino Ambrosio kick), 13:59. Green Wave 17–7. Drive: 13 plays, 75 yards, 6:27.
- TULN – Alex Bauman 1-yard pass from Michael Pratt (Valentino Ambrosio kick), 3:12. Green Wave 24–7. Drive: 8 plays, 50 yards, 4:12.
- TULN – Valentino Ambrosio 41-yard field goal, 0:00. Green Wave 27–7. Drive: 3 plays, 35 yards, 0:16.

Third quarter

- RICE – Juma Otoviano 3-yard run (Tim Horn kick), 7:44. Green Wave 27–14. Drive: 12 plays, 75 yards, 7:16.
- RICE – Boden Groen 4-yard pass from JT Daniels (Tim Horn kick), 4:15. Green Wave 27–21. Drive: 2 plays, 3 yards, 0:45.

Fourth quarter

- TULN – Valentino Ambrosio 43-yard field goal, 11:41. Green Wave 30–21. Drive: 8 plays, 30 yards, 3:49.
- RICE – Luke McCaffrey 35-yard pass from JT Daniels (Tim Horn kick), 8:16. Green Wave 30–28. Drive: 6 plays, 75 yards, 3:25.

Statistics	TULN	RICE
First downs	24	15
Total yards	457	271
Rushing yards	194	82
Passing yards	263	189
Turnovers	1	1
Time of possession	36:05	23:55

Team	Category	Player	Statistics
Tulane	Passing	Michael Pratt	22/30, 263 yards, 2 TD, INT
Tulane	Rushing	Makhi Hughes	23 rushes, 153 yards
Tulane	Receiving	Chris Brazzell II	5 receptions, 75 yards
Rice	Passing	JT Daniels	18/29, 189 yards, 2 TD, INT
Rice	Rushing	Juma Otoviano	9 rushes, 38 yards, 2 TD
Rice	Receiving	Luke McCaffrey	5 receptions, 79 yards, TD

=== SMU ===
SMU Mustangs at Rice Owls – Game summary

Quarter	1	2	3	4	Total
Mustangs	14	10	9	3	36
Owls	7	14	7	3	31

at Rice Stadium, Houston, Texas

- Date: November 4
- Game time: 6:30 p.m. CDT
- Game weather: Sunny, 75 °F (24 °C)
- Game attendance: 21,632
- Referee: Scott Hardin
- TV announcers (ESPNU): John Schriffen, Charles Arbuckle, and Dawn Davenport
- Box score, Recap

Game information
First quarter
- RICE – Chike Anigbogu 15-yard punt return (Tim Horn kick), 8:56. Owls 7–0.
- SMU – Roderick Daniels Jr. 34-yard pass from Preston Stone (Collin Rogers kick), 6:22. Tied 7–7. Drive: 7 plays, 75 yards, 2:34.
- SMU – Preston Stone 20-yard run (Collin Rogers kick), 5:48. Mustangs 14–7. Drive: 2 plays, 33 yards, 0:29.

Second quarter

- RICE – Luke McCaffrey 4-yard pass from JT Daniels (Tim Horn kick), 11:07. Tied 14–14. Drive: 9 plays, 69 yards, 4:24.
- SMU – Collin Rogers 41-yard field goal, 6:59. Mustangs 17–14. Drive: 9 plays, 51 yards, 4:08.
- SMU – Jordan Hudson 30-yard pass from Preston Stone (Collin Rogers kick), 2:09. Mustangs 24–14. Drive: 7 plays, 89 yards, 2:16.
- RICE – Dean Connors 14-yard pass from JT Daniels (Tim Horn kick), 0:18. Mustangs 24–21. Drive: 4 plays, 39 yards, 1:41.

Third quarter

- SMU – Tyler Lavine 3-yard run (pass failed), 9:32. Mustangs 30–21. Drive: 7 plays, 60 yards, 3:20.
- SMU – Collin Rogers 37-yard field goal, 3:05. Mustangs 33–21. Drive: 10 plays, 52 yards, 3:32.
- RICE – Dean Connors 1-yard run (Tim Horn kick), 0:23. Mustangs 33–28. Drive: 8 plays, 75 yards, 2:42.

Fourth quarter

- RICE – Tim Horn 32-yard field goal, 7:44. Mustangs 33–31. Drive: 6 plays, 66 yards, 4:14.
- SMU – Collin Rogers 51-yard field goal, 2:49. Mustangs 36–31. Drive: 12 plays, 41 yards, 4:55.

Statistics	SMU	RICE
First downs	28	13
Total yards	477	290
Rushing yards	223	124
Passing yards	254	166
Turnovers	1	3
Time of possession	31:31	28:29

Team	Category	Player	Statistics
SMU	Passing	Preston Stone	15/28, 217 yards, 2 TD
SMU	Rushing	Preston Stone	8 rushes, 81 yards, TD
SMU	Receiving	Jake Bailey	4 receptions, 73 yards
Rice	Passing	Chase Jenkins	10/16, 85 yards, INT
Rice	Rushing	Dean Connors	7 rushes, 77 yards, TD
Rice	Receiving	Rawson MacNeill	2 receptions, 68 yards

=== At UTSA ===
Rice Owls at UTSA Roadrunners – Game summary

Quarter	1	2	3	4	Total
Owls	0	7	0	7	14
Roadrunners	3	7	21	3	34

at Alamodome, San Antonio, Texas

- Date: November 11
- Game time: 6:30 p.m. CST
- Game weather: None (played indoors)
- Game attendance: 28,245
- Referee: Tim Rich
- TV announcers (ESPNU): Drew Carter and Dustin Fox
- Box score, Recap

Game information
First quarter
- UTSA – Chase Allen 26-yard field goal, 7:00. Roadrunners 3–0. Drive: 10 plays, 58 yards, 3:38.

Second quarter

- UTSA – Joshua Cephus 6-yard pass from Frank Harris (Chase Allen kick), 0:57. Roadrunners 10–0. Drive: 9 plays, 62 yards, 3:43.
- RICE – Luke McCaffrey 27-yard pass from A. J. Padgett (Tim Horn kick), 0:22. Roadrunners 10–7. Drive: 4 plays, 75 yards, 0:35.

Third quarter

- UTSA – Robert Henry 1-yard run (Chase Allen kick), 9:46. Roadrunners 17–7. Drive: 9 plays, 63 yards, 3:47.
- UTSA – Chris Carpenter 50-yard punt return (Chase Allen kick), 8:01. Roadrunners 24–7.
- UTSA – Rocko Griffin 1-yard run (Chase Allen kick), 3:24. Roadrunners 31–7. Drive: 5 plays, 52 yards, 2:08.

Fourth quarter

- UTSA – Tate Sandell 47-yard field goal, 5:09. Roadrunners 34–7. Drive: 5 plays, 15 yards, 2:25.
- RICE – Landon Ransom-Goelz 22-yard pass from A. J. Padgett (Tim Horn kick), 1:11. Roadrunners 34–14. Drive: 9 plays, 75 yards, 3:58.

Statistics	RICE	UTSA
First downs	17	23
Total yards	229	381
Rushing yards	47	199
Passing yards	182	182
Turnovers	1	1
Time of possession	29:49	30:11

Team	Category	Player	Statistics
Rice	Passing	A. J. Padgett	17/28, 182 yards, 2 TD
Rice	Rushing	Dean Connors	8 rushes, 34 yards
Rice	Receiving	Luke McCaffrey	6 receptions, 68 yards, TD
UTSA	Passing	Frank Harris	15/24, 175 yards, TD
UTSA	Rushing	Rocko Griffin	12 rushes, 81 yards, TD
UTSA	Receiving	Joshua Cephus	5 receptions, 53 yards, TD

=== At Charlotte ===
Rice Owls at Charlotte 49ers – Game summary

Quarter	1	2	3	4	Total
Owls	10	3	8	7	28
49ers	0	0	0	7	7

at Jerry Richardson Stadium, Charlotte, North Carolina

- Date: November 18
- Game time: 1:00 p.m. CST/2:00 p.m. EST
- Game weather: Sunny, 73 °F (23 °C)
- Game attendance: 9,385
- Referee: Edwin Lee
- TV announcers (ESPN+): Noah Reed and Reggie Walker
- Box score, Recap

Game information
First quarter
- RICE – A. J. Padgett 5-yard run (Tim Horn kick), 10:07. Owls 7–0. Drive: 7 plays, 48 yards, 3:24.
- RICE – Tim Horn 23-yard field goal, 0:25. Owls 10–0. Drive: 11 plays, 57 yards, 5:42.

Second quarter

- RICE – Tim Horn 37-yard field goal, 4:15. Owls 13–0. Drive: 5 plays, 33 yards, 1:52.

Third quarter

- RICE – A. J. Padgett 2-yard run (A. J. Padgett pass to Rawson MacNeill), 11:39. Owls 21–0. Drive: 6 plays, 76 yards, 3:21.

Fourth quarter

- CLT – Trexler Ivey 12-yard run (Jake Larson kick), 10:30. Owls 21–7. Drive: 3 plays, 3 yards, 1:35.
- RICE – Luke McCaffrey 20-yard pass from A. J. Padgett (Tim Horn kick), 3:13. Owls 28–7. Drive: 13 plays, 75 yards, 7:17.

Statistics	RICE	CLT
First downs	16	11
Total yards	380	158
Rushing yards	240	84
Passing yards	140	74
Turnovers	3	1
Time of possession	33:41	26:19

Team	Category	Player	Statistics
Rice	Passing	A. J. Padgett	13/21, 140 yards, TD, 2 INT
Rice	Rushing	Dean Connors	19 rushes, 184 yards
Rice	Receiving	Luke McCaffrey	5 receptions, 54 yards, TD
Charlotte	Passing	Trexler Ivey	8/19, 51 yards
Charlotte	Rushing	Hashaun Watson	14 rushes, 47 yards
Charlotte	Receiving	Randy Fields Jr.	2 receptions, 18 yards

=== Florida Atlantic ===
Florida Atlantic Owls at Rice Owls – Game summary

Quarter	1	2	3	4	Total
Florida Atlantic	7	0	7	7	21
Rice	7	3	14	0	24

at Rice Stadium, Houston, Texas

- Date: November 25
- Game time: 12:00 p.m. CST
- Game weather: Sunny, 62 °F (17 °C)
- Game attendance: 19,393
- Referee: Kevin Randall
- TV: ESPN+
- Box score, Recap

Game information
First quarter
- FAU – Kobe Lewis 75-yard run (Carter Davis kick), 14:48. Florida Atlantic 7–0. Drive: 1 play, 75 yards, 0:12.
- RICE – Boden Groen 20-yard pass from A. J. Padgett (Tim Horn kick), 3:04. Tied 7–7. Drive: 6 plays, 77 yards, 3:24.

Second quarter

- RICE – Tim Horn 20-yard field goal, 0:02. Rice 10–7. Drive: 11 plays, 63 yards, 3:36.

Third quarter

- FAU – Tony Johnson 36-yard pass from Daniel Richardson (Carter Davis kick), 12:36. Florida Atlantic 14–10. Drive: 4 plays, 61 yards, 1:28.
- RICE – Luke McCaffrey 7-yard pass from A. J. Padgett (Tim Horn kick), 7:27. Rice 17–14. Drive: 11 plays, 83 yards, 5:09.
- RICE – Boden Groen 11-yard pass from A. J. Padgett (Tim Horn kick), 0:00. Rice 24–14. Drive: 9 plays, 75 yards, 4:29.

Fourth quarter

- FAU – Michael Johnson Jr. 6-yard run (Carter Davis kick), 12:25. Rice 24–21. Drive: 6 plays, 75 yards, 2:35.

Statistics	FAU	RICE
First downs	14	32
Total yards	279	465
Rushing yards	151	211
Passing yards	128	254
Turnovers	0	1
Time of possession	20:18	39:42

Team	Category	Player	Statistics
Florida Atlantic	Passing	Daniel Richardson	8/9, 93 yards, TD
Florida Atlantic	Rushing	Kobe Lewis	7 rushes, 82 yards, TD
Florida Atlantic	Receiving	Tony Johnson	2 receptions, 49 yards, TD
Rice	Passing	A. J. Padgett	24/37, 255 yards, 3 TD, INT
Rice	Rushing	Dean Connors	14 rushes, 75 yards
Rice	Receiving	Luke McCaffrey	12 receptions, 141 yards, TD

=== Vs. Texas State (First Responder Bowl) ===
2023 First Responder Bowl
Texas State Bobcats vs. Rice Owls – Game summary

Quarter	1	2	3	4	Total
Bobcats	14	10	14	7	45
Owls	7	14	0	0	21

at Gerald J. Ford Stadium, University Park, Texas

- Date: December 26
- Game time: 4:30 p.m. CST
- Game weather: Sunny, 55 °F (13 °C)
- Game attendance: 26,542
- Referee: Ed Ardito
- TV announcers (ESPN): Dave Neal, Aaron Murray, and Morgan Uber
- Box score, Recap

Game information
First quarter
- TXST – Jahmyl Jeter 29-yard run (Mason Shipley kick), 13:25. Bobcats 7–0. Drive: 7 plays, 75 yards, 1:35.
- RICE – Luke McCaffrey 7-yard pass from A. J. Padgett (Tim Horn kick), 6:54. Tied 7–7. Drive: 8 plays, 42 yards, 3:38.
- TXST – Jahmyl Jeter 1-yard run (Mason Shipley kick), 3:22. Bobcats 14–7. Drive: 8 plays, 85 yards, 3:32.

Second quarter

- TXST – Brian Holloway 36-yard interception return (Mason Shipley kick), 14:36. Bobcats 21–7.
- RICE – Dean Connors 3-yard run (Tim Horn kick), 6:07. Bobcats 21–14. Drive: 11 plays, 77 yards, 5:47.
- RICE – Dean Connors 28-yard run (Tim Horn kick), 3:40. Tied 21–21. Drive: 3 plays, 58 yards, 1:24.
- TXST – Mason Shipley 31-yard field goal, 0:00. Bobcats 24–21. Drive: 15 plays, 61 yards, 3:40.

Third quarter

- TXST – Nash Jones 3-yard run (Mason Shipley kick), 9:57. Bobcats 31–21. Drive: 10 plays, 30 yards, 5:03.
- TXST – Brian Holloway 48-yard interception return (Mason Shipley kick), 8:16. Bobcats 38–21.

Fourth quarter

- TXST – Jahmyl Jeter 1-yard run (Mason Shipley kick), 2:01. Bobcats 45–21. Drive: 3 plays, 38 yards, 1:14.

Statistics	TXST	RICE
First downs	15	16
Total yards	300	197
Rushing yards	148	85
Passing yards	152	112
Turnovers	0	6
Time of possession	30:17	29:43

Team	Category	Player	Statistics
Texas State	Passing	T. J. Finley	15/29, 152 yards
Texas State	Rushing	Ismail Mahdi	24 rushes, 122 yards
Texas State	Receiving	Ashtyn Hawkins	3 receptions, 55 yards
Rice	Passing	A. J. Padgett	10/21, 85 yards, TD, 3 INT
Rice	Rushing	Dean Connors	15 rushes, 64 yards, 2 TD
Rice	Receiving	Elijah Mojarro	3 receptions, 35 yards
