= 2023 Florida Atlantic Owls football team =

American college football season

2023 Florida Atlantic Owls football
- Conference: American Athletic Conference
- Record: 4–8 (3–5 AAC)
- Head coach: Tom Herman (1st season)
- Offensive coordinator: Charlie Frye (1st season)
- Offensive scheme: Up-tempo
- Defensive coordinator: Roc Bellantoni (1st season)
- Co-defensive coordinator: Brandon Harris (1st season)
- Base defense: Multiple
- Home stadium: FAU Stadium

2023 American Athletic Conference football standings
	Conf.			Overall
Team	W		L	W		L
No. 22 SMU y$	8	–	0	11	–	3
Tulane y	8	–	0	11	–	3
UTSA	7	–	1	9	–	4
Memphis	6	–	2	10	–	3
South Florida	4	–	4	7	–	6
Rice	4	–	4	6	–	7
Navy	4	–	4	5	–	7
North Texas	3	–	5	5	–	7
UAB	3	–	5	4	–	8
Florida Atlantic	3	–	5	4	–	8
Charlotte	2	–	6	3	–	9
Tulsa	2	–	6	4	–	8
Temple	1	–	7	3	–	9
East Carolina	1	–	7	2	–	10
Championship: SMU 26, Tulane 14
$ – Conference champion; y – Championship game participant; Rankings from AP Poll

The 2023 Florida Atlantic Owls football team represented Florida Atlantic University in the 2023 NCAA Division I FBS football season. The Owls played their home games at FAU Stadium in Boca Raton, Florida, and competed in their first season as members of the American Athletic Conference (AAC). They were led by first-year head coach Tom Herman. The Florida Atlantic Owls football team drew an average home attendance of 18,603 in 2023.

== Transfers ==
=== Outgoing ===
Name	Pos.	New school
Adarius Tolliver	OT	Unknown
Antarrius Moultrie	LB	Edward Waters
Dearis Thomas	LB	Bethune–Cookman
Glover Cook	RB	UT Martin
Kareem Wilson	DL	Rhode Island
Kelvin Dean	ATH	Florida A&M
Jahmal Edrine	WR	Purdue
Ja'Marquis Johnson	WR	Unknown
Jaylen Joyner	EDGE	Memphis
Jordan Young	WR	Unknown
Julius Barfield	WDE	Quincy
Kobe Stewart	WR	Northwestern State
Marvin Scott III	RB	Unknown
Peter Warrick	CB	Florida State
Riley Thompson	P	Penn State
Teja Young	S	Ole Miss
Willie Taggart Jr.	ATH	Western Kentucky

=== Incoming ===
Name	Pos.	Previous school
Daniel Richardson	QB	Central Michigan
Richard Thomas	EDGE	Indiana
Woody Jean	ATH	Arizona
Kobe Lewis	RB	Purdue
Jarron Morris	CB	Texas State
Devin Price	WR	Texas A&M
Ben Ballard	QB	Texas
Kahlil Brantley	TE	Miami (FL)
Desmond Tisdol	LB	Auburn
Elijah Brown	TE	Alabama
Casey Thompson	QB	Nebraska

== Preseason ==
=== Spring game ===
The 2023 FAU spring exhibition game was played on Saturday, April 15, 2023, at FAU Stadium. The team was split into two squads for gameplay, Team Red and Team White.

Date	Time	Spring Game	Site	Result
April 15	12:00 pm	Team Red vs. Team White	FAU Stadium • Boca Raton, FL	Team Red 42-17 Team White

== Schedule ==
Florida Atlantic and the American Athletic Conference (AAC) announced the 2023 football schedule on February 21, 2023.

Date	Time	Opponent	Site	TV	Result	Attendance
September 2	6:00 p.m.	Monmouth*	FAU Stadium; Boca Raton, FL	ESPN+	W 42–20	20,893
September 9	6:00 p.m.	Ohio*	FAU Stadium; Boca Raton, FL	ESPN+	L 10–17	17,934
September 16	8:00 p.m.	at Clemson*	Memorial Stadium; Clemson, SC	ACCN	L 14–48	81,295
September 23	3:30 p.m.	at Illinois*	Memorial Stadium; Champaign, IL	BTN	L 17–23	53,512
October 7	6:00 p.m.	Tulsa	FAU Stadium; Boca Raton, FL	ESPN+	W 20–17	21,077
October 14	3:30 p.m.	at South Florida	Raymond James Stadium; Tampa, FL (rivalry)	ESPN2	W 56–14	36,670
October 21	6:00 p.m.	UTSA^{†}	FAU Stadium; Boca Raton, FL	ESPN+	L 10–36	17,241
October 27	7:30 p.m.	at Charlotte	Jerry Richardson Stadium; Charlotte, NC	ESPN2	W 38–16	10,857
November 4	3:00 p.m.	at UAB	Protective Stadium; Birmingham, AL	ESPN+	L 42–45	20,676
November 11	4:00 p.m.	East Carolina	FAU Stadium; Boca Raton, FL	ESPN+	L 7–22	17,532
November 18	12:00 p.m.	No. 24 Tulane	FAU Stadium; Boca Raton, FL	ESPN+	L 8–24	15,871
November 25	1:00 p.m.	at Rice	Rice Stadium; Houston, TX	ESPN+	L 21–24	19,393
*Non-conference game; ^{†}Homecoming; Rankings from AP Poll released prior to the game; All times are in Eastern time

== Coaching staff ==
Name	Title
Tom Herman	Head coach
Roc Bellantoni	Defensive coordinator / linebackers coach
Charlie Frye	Offensive coordinator / quarterbacks coach
Corey Bell	Defensive pass game coordinator
Brandon Harris	Co-Defensive coordinator / Cornerbacks coach
Ed Warinner	Assistant head coach / Run game coordinator / offensive line coach
Chad Lunsford	Associate head coach / Tight ends coach / special teams coordinator
David Beaty	Wide receivers coach
Derrick Gibson	Safeties coach
Roosevelt Maggitt	Defensive line coach
Chris Perkins	Running backs coach

== Game summaries ==
=== vs Monmouth ===
Monmouth Hawks (FCS) (0–0) vs Florida Atlantic Owls (0–0) – Game summary

Quarter	1	2	3	4	Total
Hawks (FCS)	7	7	0	6	20
Owls	14	14	14	0	42

at FAU Stadium • Boca Raton, Florida

- Date: September 2
- Game time: 6:00 p.m. EDT
- Game weather: Sunny • Temperature: 87 °F (31 °C) • Wind: NE at 12 miles per hour (19 km/h)
- Game attendance: 20,893
- Referee: Darryl DeBerry
- TV announcers (ESPN+): Ted Emrich (play-by-play), Leger Douzable (analyst)

Game information

First quarter

- (11:28) FAU – Larry McCammon 6 yard run, Logan Lupo kick (Drive: 5 plays, 80 yards, 1:30; Florida Atlantic 7–0)
- (6:46) FAU – Tony Johnson 9 yard pass from Casey Thompson, Logan Lupo kick (Drive: 7 plays, 79 yards, 2:40; Florida Atlantic 14–0)
- (1:53) MONM – Sone Ntoh 2 yard run, Michael Calton Jr. kick (Drive: 13 plays, 75 yards, 4:53; Florida Atlantic 14–7)

Second quarter

- (14:14) FAU – LaJohntay Wester 2 yard pass from Casey Thompson, Logan Lupo kick (Drive: 7 plays, 75 yards, 2:39; Florida Atlantic 21–7)
- (6:48) FAU – Je’Quan Burton 8 yard pass from Casey Thompson, Logan Lupo kick (Drive: 2 plays, 29 yards, 0:29; Florida Atlantic 28–7)
- (0:25) MONM – Assanti Kearney 27 yard pass from Marquez McCray, Michael Calton Jr. kick (Drive: 9 plays, 62 yards, 2:08; Florida Atlantic 28–14)

Third quarter

- (6:59) FAU – Je’Quan Burton 35 yard pass from Casey Thompson, Logan Lupo kick (Drive: 6 plays, 74 yards, 2:31; Florida Atlantic 35–14)
- (2:30) FAU – Tony Johnson 72 yard pass from Casey Thompson, Logan Lupo kick (Drive: 1 play, 72 yards, 0:12; Florida Atlantic 42–14)

Fourth quarter

- (7:19) MONM – Dre Tucker 16 yard pass from Marquez McCray, kick failed (Drive: 6 plays, 75 yards, 2:10; Florida Atlantic 42–20)

Statistics	Monmouth (FCS)	Florida Atlantic
First downs	19	22
Plays–yards	83–361	59–493
Rushes–yards	36–112	32–213
Passing yards	249	280
Passing: comp–att–int	26–47–1	22–27–1
Turnovers		
Time of possession	34:21	25:39

Team	Category	Player	Statistics
Monmouth (FCS)	Passing	Marquez McCray	26/46, 249 yards, 2 TD, 1 INT
Monmouth (FCS)	Rushing	Jaden Shirden	24 carries, 66 yards
Monmouth (FCS)	Receiving	Dymere Miller	10 receptions, 78 yards
Florida Atlantic	Passing	Casey Thompson	20/25, 280 yards, 5 TD, 1 INT
Florida Atlantic	Rushing	Larry McCammon	13 carries, 125 yards, 1 TD
Florida Atlantic	Receiving	Tony Johnson	5 receptions, 91 yards, 2 TD

=== vs Ohio ===
Ohio Bobcats (1–1) vs Florida Atlantic Owls (1–0) – Game summary

Quarter	1	2	3	4	Total
Bobcats	0	7	7	3	17
Owls	0	10	0	0	10

at FAU Stadium • Boca Raton, Florida

- Date: September 9
- Game time: 6:00 p.m. EDT
- Game weather: Sunny • Temperature: 79 °F (26 °C) • Wind: E at 4 miles per hour (6.4 km/h)
- Game attendance: 17,934
- Referee: Edwin Lee
- TV announcers (ESPN+): James Westling (play-by-play), Leger Douzable (analyst), Smacker Miles (sideline reporter)

Game information

First quarter

- No scoring plays

Second quarter

- (6:54) FAU – Logan Lupo 37 yard field goal (Drive: 5 plays, 13 yards, 2:09; Florida Atlantic 3–0)
- (5:12) FAU – Jarron Morris 72 yard interception return, Carter Davis kick (Florida Atlantic 10–0)
- (0:23) OHIO – Will Kacmarek 13 yard pass from Kurtis Rourke, Gianni Spetic kick (Drive: 11 plays, 75 yards, 4:49; Florida Atlantic 10–7)

Third quarter

- (5:38) OHIO – O’Shaan Allison 5 yard run, Alex Kasee kick (Drive: 9 plays, 80 yards, 5:39; Ohio 14–10)

Fourth quarter

- (5:26) OHIO – Alex Kasee 39 yard field goal (Drive: 11 plays, 38 yards, 5:49; Ohio 17–10)

Statistics	Ohio	Florida Atlantic
First downs	23	13
Plays–yards	74–354	58–185
Rushes–yards	45–151	15–5
Passing yards	203	180
Passing: comp–att–int	18–29–2	23–43–2
Turnovers		
Time of possession	37:13	22:47

Team	Category	Player	Statistics
Ohio	Passing	Kurtis Rourke	18/29, 203 yards, 1 TD, 2 INT
Ohio	Rushing	O’Shaan Allison	22 carries, 80 yards, 1 TD
Ohio	Receiving	Mason Williams	2 receptions, 46 yards
Florida Atlantic	Passing	Casey Thompson	23/42, 180 yards, 2 INT
Florida Atlantic	Rushing	Larry McCammon	7 carries, 23 yards
Florida Atlantic	Receiving	LaJohntay Wester	12 receptions, 101 yards

=== at Clemson ===
Florida Atlantic Owls (1–1) vs Clemson Tigers (1–1) – Game summary

Quarter	1	2	3	4	Total
Owls	0	0	0	14	14
Tigers	20	14	7	7	48

at Memorial Stadium • Clemson, South Carolina

- Date: September 16
- Game time: 8:00 p.m. EDT
- Game weather: Cloudy • Temperature: 72 °F (22 °C) • Wind: W at 4 miles per hour (6.4 km/h)
- Game attendance: 81,295
- Referee: Tim Hedgepeth
- TV announcers (ACCN): Wes Durham (play-by-play), Tim Hasselbeck (analyst), Taylor Tannebaum (sideline reporter)

Game information

First quarter

- (13:35) CLEM – Nate Wiggins 46 yard interception return, Robert Gunn III kick (Clemson 7–0)
- (7:27) CLEM – Tyler Brown 30 yard pass from Cade Klubnik, kick failed (Drive: 9 plays, 79 yards, 3:52; Clemson 13–0)
- (1:20) CLEM – Jake Briningstool 7 yard pass from Cade Klubnik, Robert Gunn III kick (Drive: 4 plays, 26 yards, 1:42; Clemson 20–0)

Second quarter

- (12:19) CLEM – Phil Mafah 19 yard run, Robert Gunn III kick (Drive: 5 plays, 63 yards, 1:51; Clemson 27–0)
- (3:25) CLEM – Cade Klubnik 1 yard run, Robert Gunn III kick (Drive: 9 plays, 71 yards, 3:59; Clemson 34–0)

Third quarter

- (2:56) CLEM – Tyler Brown 2 yard pass from Cade Klubnik, Robert Gunn III kick (Drive: 5 plays, 26 yards, 1:22; Clemson 41–0)

Fourth quarter

- (12:07) FAU – Michael Johnson Jr. 2 yard run, Logan Lupo kick (Drive: 15 plays, 75 yards, 5:49; Clemson 41–7)
- (8:00) CLEM – Domonique Thomas 2 yard run, Robert Gunn III kick (Drive: 10 plays, 80 yards, 4:00; Clemson 48–7)
- (1:03) FAU – Devin Price 33 yard pass from Javion Posey, Logan Lupo kick (Drive: 4 plays, 45 yards, 1:10; Clemson 48–14)

Statistics	Florida Atlantic	Clemson
First downs	20	20
Plays–yards	82–293	66–367
Rushes–yards	36–83	33–163
Passing yards	210	204
Passing: comp–att–int	27–46–3	20–33–0
Turnovers		
Time of possession	34:07	25:53

Team	Category	Player	Statistics
Florida Atlantic	Passing	Daniel Richardson	18/32, 120 yards, 1 INT
Florida Atlantic	Rushing	Kobe Lewis	14 carries, 49 yards
Florida Atlantic	Receiving	LaJohntay Wester	12 receptions, 108 yards
Clemson	Passing	Cade Klubnik	16/27, 169 yards, 3 TD
Clemson	Rushing	Phil Mafah	5 carries, 42 yards, 1 TD
Clemson	Receiving	Adam Randall	2 receptions, 51 yards

=== at Illinois ===
Florida Atlantic Owls (1–2) vs Illinois Fighting Illini (1–2) – Game summary

Quarter	1	2	3	4	Total
Owls	10	0	0	7	17
Fighting Illini	0	14	9	0	23

at Memorial Stadium • Champaign, Illinois

- Date: September 23
- Game time: 3:30 p.m. EDT
- Game weather: Sunny • Temperature: 83 °F (28 °C) • Wind: SE at 8 miles per hour (13 km/h)
- Game attendance: 53,512
- Referee: Gregory Blum
- TV announcers (BTN): Jason Ross Jr. (play-by-play), Howard Griffith (analyst), Justine Ward (sideline reporter)

Game information

First quarter

- (3:14) FAU – Logan Lupo 22 yard field goal (Drive: 5 plays, 24 yards, 1:49; Florida Atlantic 3–0)
- (0:00) FAU – LaJohntay Wester 19 yard pass from Daniel Richardson, Logan Lupo kick (Drive: 4 plays, 38 yards, 1:25; Florida Atlantic 10–0)

Second quarter

- (12:46) ILL – Griffin Moore 46 yard pass from Luke Altmyer, Caleb Griffin kick (Drive: 6 plays, 76 yards, 2:07; Florida Atlantic 10–7)
- (1:45) ILL – Luke Altmyer 7 yard run, Caleb Griffin kick (Drive: 8 plays, 85 yards, 3:01; Illinois 14–10)

Third quarter

- (8:11) ILL – Aidan Laughery 3 yard run, kick failed (Drive: 8 plays, 94 yards, 3:11; Illinois 20–10)
- (3:57) ILL – Caleb Griffin 44 yard field goal (Drive: 5 plays, 54 yards, 1:55; Illinois 23–10)

Fourth quarter

- (4:19) FAU – BJ Alexander 9 yard pass from Daniel Richardson, Logan Lupo kick (Drive: 13 plays, 97 yards, 3:57; Illinois 23–17)

Statistics	Florida Atlantic	Illinois
First downs	19	26
Plays–yards	73–353	77–510
Rushes–yards	24–97	41–207
Passing yards	256	303
Passing: comp–att–int	28–49–1	25–36–0
Turnovers		
Time of possession	28:33	31:27

Team	Category	Player	Statistics
Florida Atlantic	Passing	Daniel Richardson	28/49, 256 yards, 2 TD, 1 INT
Florida Atlantic	Rushing	Larry McCammon	17 carries, 89 yards
Florida Atlantic	Receiving	LaJohntay Wester	13 receptions, 137 yards, 1 TD
Illinois	Passing	Luke Altmyer	25/36, 303 yards, 1 TD
Illinois	Rushing	Reggie Love III	12 carries, 85 yards
Illinois	Receiving	Isaiah Williams	8 receptions, 120 yards

=== vs Tulsa ===
Tulsa Golden Hurricane (3–2) vs Florida Atlantic Owls (1–3) – Game summary

Quarter	1	2	3	4	Total
Golden Hurricane	0	7	3	7	17
Owls	14	3	0	3	20

at FAU Stadium • Boca Raton, Florida

- Date: October 7
- Game time: 6:00 p.m. EDT
- Game weather: Sunny • Temperature: 83 °F (28 °C) • Wind: SE at 8 miles per hour (13 km/h)
- Game attendance: 21,077
- Referee: Nate Black
- TV announcers (ESPN+): Matt Schumacker (play-by-play), Taylor McHargue (analyst)

Game information

First quarter

- (8:02) FAU – Larry McCammon 1 yard run, Logan Lupo kick (Drive: 10 plays, 85 yards, 3:52; Florida Atlantic 7–0)
- (3:11) FAU – Larry McCammon 10 yard run, Logan Lupo kick (Drive: 6 plays, 41 yards, 2:04; Florida Atlantic 14–0)

Second quarter

- (9:07) TLSA – Cardell Williams 7 yard run, Chase Meyer kick (Drive: 12 plays, 90 yards, 4:30; Florida Atlantic 14–7)
- (0:58) FAU – Logan Lupo 21 yard field goal (Drive: 6 plays, 26 yards, 2:37; Florida Atlantic 17–7)

Third quarter

- (7:09) TLSA – Chase Meyer 36 yard field goal (Drive: 9 plays, 45 yards, 4:29; Florida Atlantic 17–10)

Fourth quarter

- (12:44) FAU – Logan Lupo 27 yard field goal (Drive: 8 plays, 83 yards, 4:08; Florida Atlantic 20–10)
- (5:01) TLSA – Luke McGary 20 yard pass from Braylon Braxton, Chase Meyer kick (Drive: 7 plays, 80 yards, 2:55; Florida Atlantic 20–17)

Statistics	Tulsa	Florida Atlantic
First downs	16	18
Plays–yards	71–376	71–378
Rushes–yards	43–194	43–234
Passing yards	182	144
Passing: comp–att–int	13–28–2	18–28–1
Turnovers		
Time of possession	28:39	31:21

Team	Category	Player	Statistics
Tulsa	Passing	Cardell Williams	10/20, 115 yards, 2 INT
Tulsa	Rushing	Tahj Gary	11 carries, 53 yards
Tulsa	Receiving	Kamdyn Benjamin	3 receptions, 46 yards
Florida Atlantic	Passing	Daniel Richardson	18/28, 144 yards, 1 INT
Florida Atlantic	Rushing	Larry McCammon	26 carries, 130 yards, 2 TD
Florida Atlantic	Receiving	LaJohntay Wester	9 receptions, 98 yards

=== at South Florida ===
Florida Atlantic Owls (2–3) vs South Florida Bulls (3–3) – Game summary

Quarter	1	2	3	4	Total
Owls	7	14	21	14	56
Bulls	0	14	0	0	14

at Raymond James Stadium • Tampa, Florida

- Date: October 14
- Game time: 3:30 p.m. EDT
- Game weather: Sunny • Temperature: 83 °F (28 °C) • Wind: NW at 11 miles per hour (18 km/h)
- Game attendance: 36,670
- Referee: Tim Rich
- TV announcers (ESPN2): Beth Mowins (play-by-play), Kirk Morrison (analyst), Stormy Buonantony (sideline reporter)

Game information

First quarter

- (11:43) FAU – Zeke Moore 2 yard pass from Daniel Richardson, Logan Lupo kick (Drive: 7 plays, 67 yards, 2:52; Florida Atlantic 7–0)

Second quarter

- (10:59) FAU – Michael Johnson Jr. 9 yard run, Logan Lupo kick (Drive: 7 plays, 86 yards, 2:46; Florida Atlantic 14–0)
- (9:33) USF – Nay’Quan Wright 8 yard run, John Cannon kick (Drive: 5 plays, 75 yards, 1:26; Florida Atlantic 14–7)
- (5:37) FAU – Larry McCammon 3 yard run, Logan Lupo kick (Drive: 9 plays, 75 yards, 3:56; Florida Atlantic 21–7)
- (0:12) USF – Gunnar Greenwald 2 yard pass from Byrum Brown, John Cannon kick (Drive: 10 plays, 76 yards, 2:17; Florida Atlantic 21–14)

Third quarter

- (12:41) FAU – Michael Johnson Jr. 5 yard run, Logan Lupo kick (Drive: 5 plays, 68 yards, 2:14; Florida Atlantic 28–14)
- (7:50) FAU – LaJohntay Wester 17 yard pass from Daniel Richardson, Logan Lupo kick (Drive: 8 plays, 64 yards, 3:08; Florida Atlantic 35–14)
- (6:14) FAU – LaJohntay Wester 67 yard punt return, Logan Lupo kick (Florida Atlantic 42–14)

Fourth quarter

- (14:55) FAU – Tony Johnson 23 yard pass from Daniel Richardson, Logan Lupo kick (Drive: 6 plays, 64 yards, 2:22; Florida Atlantic 49–14)
- (6:44) FAU – Kobe Lewis 12 yard run, Logan Lupo kick (Drive: 10 plays, 70 yards, 6:04; Florida Atlantic 56–14)

Statistics	Florida Atlantic	South Florida
First downs	27	21
Plays–yards	78–587	72–388
Rushes–yards	40–205	38–138
Passing yards	382	250
Passing: comp–att–int	31–38–1	20–34–0
Turnovers		
Time of possession	36:19	23:41

Team	Category	Player	Statistics
Florida Atlantic	Passing	Daniel Richardson	31/38, 382 yards, 3 TD, 1 INT
Florida Atlantic	Rushing	Larry McCammon	18 carries, 75 yards, 1 TD
Florida Atlantic	Receiving	Tony Johnson	8 receptions, 131 yards, 1 TD
South Florida	Passing	Byrum Brown	15/26, 179 yards, 1 TD
South Florida	Rushing	Nay’Quan Wright	15 carries, 106 yards, 1 TD
South Florida	Receiving	Michael Brown-Stephens	4 receptions, 98 yards

=== vs UTSA ===
UTSA Roadrunners (3–3) vs Florida Atlantic Owls (3–3) – Game summary

Quarter	1	2	3	4	Total
Roadrunners	7	13	9	7	36
Owls	10	0	0	0	10

at FAU Stadium • Boca Raton, Florida

- Date: October 21
- Game time: 6:00 p.m. EDT
- Game weather: Sunny • Temperature: 87 °F (31 °C) • Wind: NW at 7 miles per hour (11 km/h)
- Game attendance: 17,241
- Referee: Kevin Randall
- TV announcers (ESPN+): Richard Cross (play-by-play), Taylor McHargue (analyst)

Game information

First quarter

- (9:43) UTSA – Robert Henry 15 yard run, Chase Allen kick (Drive: 14 plays, 75 yards, 5:17; UTSA 7–0)
- (6:20) FAU – Logan Lupo 37 yard field goal (Drive: 11 plays, 56 yards, 3:23; UTSA 7–3)
- (0:23) FAU – Latrell Jean 11 yard interception return, Logan Lupo kick (Florida Atlantic 10–7)

Second quarter

- (11:51) UTSA – Chase Allen 34 yard field goal (Drive: 9 plays, 58 yards, 3:32; Tied 10–10)
- (6:47) UTSA – Willie McCoy 10 yard pass from Frank Harris, Chase Allen kick (Drive: 9 plays, 65 yards, 3:44; UTSA 17–10)
- (0:00) UTSA – Chase Allen 37 yard field goal (Drive: 4 plays, 17 yards, 0:26; UTSA 20–10)

Third quarter

- (8:16) UTSA – Tykee Ogle-Kellogg 42 yard pass from Frank Harris, Chase Allen kick (Drive: 6 plays, 77 yards, 2:28; UTSA 27–10)
- (1:24) UTSA – Team safety (UTSA 29–10)

Fourth quarter

- (2:32) UTSA – Rocko Griffin 6 yard run, Chase Allen kick (Drive: 6 plays, 26 yards, 3:21; UTSA 36–10)

Statistics	UTSA	Florida Atlantic
First downs	27	12
Plays–yards	79–437	62–162
Rushes–yards	43–176	28–20
Passing yards	261	142
Passing: comp–att–int	26–36–2	19–34–2
Turnovers		
Time of possession	35:33	24:27

Team	Category	Player	Statistics
UTSA	Passing	Frank Harris	26/35, 261 yards, 2 TD, 2 INT
UTSA	Rushing	Kevorian Barnes	10 carries, 56 yards
UTSA	Receiving	Devin McCuin	5 receptions, 64 yards
Florida Atlantic	Passing	Daniel Richardson	19/34, 142 yards, 2 INT
Florida Atlantic	Rushing	Larry McCammon	15 carries, 30 yards
Florida Atlantic	Receiving	Je’Quan Burton	5 receptions, 68 yards

=== at Charlotte ===
Florida Atlantic Owls (3–4) vs Charlotte 49ers (2–5) – Game summary

Quarter	1	2	3	4	Total
Owls	7	14	10	7	38
49ers	3	3	10	0	16

at Jerry Richardson Stadium • Charlotte, North Carolina

- Date: October 27
- Game time: 7:30 p.m. EDT
- Game weather: Sunny • Temperature: 70 °F (21 °C) • Wind: SW at 5 miles per hour (8.0 km/h)
- Game attendance: 10,857
- Referee: Scott Hardin
- TV announcers (ESPN2): Anish Shroff, Andre Ware, Paul Carcaterra

Game information

First quarter

- (8:46) CHAR – Kyle Cunanan 36-yard field goal (Drive: 13 plays, 58 yards, 6:14; Charlotte 3–0)
- (6:53) FAU – Zeke Moore 3-yard pass from Daniel Richardson, Carter Davis kick (Drive: 6 plays, 75 yards, 1:53; Florida Atlantic 7–3)

Second quarter

- (13:15) FAU – LaJohntay Wester 21-yard pass from Daniel Richardson, Carter Davis kick (Drive: 6 plays, 59 yards, 2:29; Florida Atlantic 14–3)
- (8:20) CHAR – Kyle Cunanan 44-yard field goal (Drive: 10 plays, 49 yards, 4:55; Florida Atlantic 14–6)
- (1:03) FAU – LaJohntay Wester 26-yard pass from Daniel Richardson, Carter Davis kick (Drive: 10 plays, 94 yards, 3:16; Florida Atlantic 21–6)

Third quarter

- (13:46) FAU – Michael Johnson Jr. 19-yard run, Carter Davis kick (Drive: 3 plays, 57 yards, 1:14; Florida Atlantic 28–6)
- (10:36) CHAR – Jake Clemons 10-yard pass from Trexler Ivey, Kyle Cunanan kick (Drive: 6 plays, 45 yards, 3:10; Florida Atlantic 28–13)
- (6:21) CHAR – Kyle Cunanan 44-yard field goal (Drive: 7 plays, 27 yards, 3:13; Florida Atlantic 28–16)
- (1:38) FAU – Carter Davis 38-yard field goal (Drive: 10 plays, 55 yards, 4:43; Florida Atlantic 31–16)

Fourth quarter

- (2:12) FAU – Larry McCammon 4-yard run, Carter Davis kick (Drive: 5 plays, 35 yards, 3:03; Florida Atlantic 38–16)

Statistics	FAU	CHAR
First downs	21	22
Total yards	349	325
Rushing yards	131	161
Passing yards	218	164
Turnovers	1	0
Time of possession	21:31	38:29

Team	Category	Player	Statistics
Florida Atlantic	Passing	Daniel Richardson	19/26, 218 yards, 3 TD, INT
Florida Atlantic	Rushing	Larry McCammon	15 carries, 67 yards, TD
Florida Atlantic	Receiving	LaJohntay Wester	10 receptions, 149 yards, 2 TD
Charlotte	Passing	Trexler Ivey	8/15, 68 yards, TD
Charlotte	Rushing	Terron Kellman	20 carries, 83 yards
Charlotte	Receiving	Jake Clemons	2 receptions, 28 yards, TD

=== vs No. 24 Tulane ===
No. 24 Tulane Green Wave (9–1) at Florida Atlantic Owls (4–6) – Game summary

Quarter	1	2	3	4	Total
No. 24 Green Wave	7	7	10	0	24
Owls	0	0	0	8	8

at FAU Stadium, Boca Raton, Florida

- Date: November 18, 2023
- Game time: 12:00 p.m. EST
- Game weather: Sunny
- Game attendance: 15,871
- Referee: Nate Black
- TV: ESPN+

Game information

First Quarter

- (5:10) TUL – Chris Carter 9-yard pass from Michael Pratt, Valentino Ambrosio kick (Drive: 5 plays, 77 yards, 2:32; Tulane 7–0)

Second Quarter

- (14:14) TUL – Chris Brazzell II 9-yard pass from Michael Pratt, Valentino Ambrosio kick (Drive: 9 plays, 58 yards, 3:51; Tulane 14–0)

Third Quarter

- (7:39) TUL – Chris Carter 8-yard pass from Michael Pratt, Valentino Ambrosio kick (Drive: 11 plays, 55 yards, 5:59; Tulane 21–0)
- (0:12) TUL – Valentino Ambrosio 20-yard field goal (Drive: 11 plays, 73 yards, 6:14; Tulane 24–0)

Fourth Quarter

- (8:58) FAU – Kahlil Brantley 4-yard pass from Daniel Richardson (Drive: 15 plays, 75 yards, 6:14; Tulane 24–8)

Statistics	TUL	FAU
First downs	17	14
Total yards	336	234
Rushing yards	84	32
Passing yards	252	202
Turnovers	1	1
Time of possession	32:08	27:52

Team	Category	Player	Statistics
Tulane	Passing	Michael Pratt	21/28, 252 yards, 3 TD
Tulane	Rushing	Makhi Hughes	21 carries, 72 yards
Tulane	Receiving	Chris Brazzell II	7 receptions, 103 yards, TD
Florida Atlantic	Passing	Daniel Richardson	24/31, 202 yards, TD, INT
Florida Atlantic	Rushing	Larry McCammon	10 carries, 32 yards
Florida Atlantic	Receiving	LaJohntay Wester	11 receptions, 86 yards

=== at Rice ===
Florida Atlantic Owls (4–7) at Rice Owls (5–6) – Game summary

Quarter	1	2	3	4	Total
Florida Atlantic	7	0	7	7	21
Rice	7	3	14	0	24

at Rice Stadium, Houston, Texas

- Date: November 25
- Game time: 12:00 p.m. CST
- Game weather: Sunny, 62 °F (17 °C)
- Game attendance: 19,393
- Referee: Kevin Randall
- TV: ESPN+

Game information
First quarter
- FAU – Kobe Lewis 75-yard run (Carter Davis kick), 14:48. Florida Atlantic 7–0. Drive: 1 play, 75 yards, 0:12.
- RICE – Boden Groen 20-yard pass from A. J. Padgett (Tim Horn kick), 3:04. Tied 7–7. Drive: 6 plays, 77 yards, 3:24.

Second quarter

- RICE – Tim Horn 20-yard field goal, 0:02. Rice 10–7. Drive: 11 plays, 63 yards, 3:36.

Third quarter

- FAU – Tony Johnson 36-yard pass from Daniel Richardson (Carter Davis kick), 12:36. Florida Atlantic 14–10. Drive: 4 plays, 61 yards, 1:28.
- RICE – Luke McCaffrey 7-yard pass from A. J. Padgett (Tim Horn kick), 7:27. Rice 17–14. Drive: 11 plays, 83 yards, 5:09.
- RICE – Boden Groen 11-yard pass from A. J. Padgett (Tim Horn kick), 0:00. Rice 24–14. Drive: 9 plays, 75 yards, 4:29.

Fourth quarter

- FAU – Michael Johnson Jr. 6-yard run (Carter Davis kick), 12:25. Rice 24–21. Drive: 6 plays, 75 yards, 2:35.

Statistics	FAU	RICE
First downs	14	32
Total yards	279	465
Rushing yards	151	211
Passing yards	128	254
Turnovers	0	1
Time of possession	20:18	39:42

Team	Category	Player	Statistics
Florida Atlantic	Passing	Daniel Richardson	8/9, 93 yards, TD
Florida Atlantic	Rushing	Kobe Lewis	7 rushes, 82 yards, TD
Florida Atlantic	Receiving	Tony Johnson	2 receptions, 49 yards, TD
Rice	Passing	A. J. Padgett	24/37, 255 yards, 3 TD, INT
Rice	Rushing	Dean Connors	14 rushes, 75 yards
Rice	Receiving	Luke McCaffrey	12 receptions, 141 yards, TD
