= 2023 Tulsa Golden Hurricane football team =

American college football season

2023 Tulsa Golden Hurricane football
- Conference: American Athletic Conference
- Record: 4–8 (2–6 AAC)
- Head coach: Kevin Wilson (1st season)
- Offensive coordinator: Steve Spurrier Jr. (1st season)
- Offensive scheme: Spread
- Defensive coordinator: Chris Polizzi (1st season)
- Base defense: 4–2–5
- Home stadium: Skelly Field at H. A. Chapman Stadium

2023 American Athletic Conference football standings
	Conf.			Overall
Team	W		L	W		L
No. 22 SMU y$	8	–	0	11	–	3
Tulane y	8	–	0	11	–	3
UTSA	7	–	1	9	–	4
Memphis	6	–	2	10	–	3
South Florida	4	–	4	7	–	6
Rice	4	–	4	6	–	7
Navy	4	–	4	5	–	7
North Texas	3	–	5	5	–	7
UAB	3	–	5	4	–	8
Florida Atlantic	3	–	5	4	–	8
Charlotte	2	–	6	3	–	9
Tulsa	2	–	6	4	–	8
Temple	1	–	7	3	–	9
East Carolina	1	–	7	2	–	10
Championship: SMU 26, Tulane 14
$ – Conference champion; y – Championship game participant; Rankings from AP Poll

The 2023 Tulsa Golden Hurricane football team represented the University of Tulsa as a member of the American Athletic Conference (AAC) during the 2023 NCAA Division I FBS football season. The Golden Hurricane were led by first-year head coach Kevin Wilson and played their home games at Skelly Field at H. A. Chapman Stadium in Tulsa, Oklahoma. The Tulsa Golden Hurricane football team drew an average home attendance of 20,187 in 2023.

== Schedule ==
Date	Time	Opponent	Site	TV	Result	Attendance
August 31	7:00 p.m.	Arkansas–Pine Bluff*	Skelly Field at H. A. Chapman Stadium; Tulsa, OK	ESPN+	W 42–7	17,529
September 9	4:00 p.m.	at No. 8 Washington*	Husky Stadium; Seattle, WA	P12N	L 10–43	63,128
September 16	2:30 p.m.	No. 19 Oklahoma*	Skelly Field at H. A. Chapman Stadium; Tulsa, OK	ESPN2	L 17–66	30,855
September 23	11:00 a.m.	at Northern Illinois*	Huskie Stadium; DeKalb, IL	CBSSN	W 22–14	10,321
September 28	6:30 p.m.	Temple	Skelly Field at H. A. Chapman Stadium; Tulsa, OK	ESPN	W 48–26	17,538
October 7	5:00 p.m.	at Florida Atlantic	FAU Stadium; Boca Raton, FL	ESPN+	L 17–20	21,077
October 19	6:00 p.m.	Rice	Skelly Field at H. A. Chapman Stadium; Tulsa, OK	ESPN2	L 10–42	18,527
October 28	11:00 a.m.	at SMU	Gerald J. Ford Stadium; Dallas, TX	ESPNU	L 10–69	20,800
November 4	3:00 p.m.	Charlotte^{†}	Skelly Field at H. A. Chapman Stadium; Tulsa, OK	ESPN+	L 26–33 ^{OT}	20,151
November 11	11:00 a.m.	at No. 23 Tulane	Yulman Stadium; New Orleans, LA	ESPN2	L 22–24	20,126
November 18	2:00 p.m.	North Texas	Skelly Field at H. A. Chapman Stadium; Tulsa, OK	ESPN+	L 28–35	16,520
November 25	1:00 p.m.	at East Carolina	Dowdy–Ficklen Stadium; Greenville, NC	ESPN+	W 29–27	29,567
*Non-conference game; ^{†}Homecoming; Rankings from AP Poll released prior to the game; All times are in Central time

== Game summaries ==
=== Arkansas–Pine Bluff ===
Uniform combination
Helmet	Jersey	Pants

Arkansas–Pine Bluff (0–0, 0–0) at Tulsa (0–0, 0–0)

Quarter	1	2	3	4	Total
Arkansas–Pine Bluff	7	0	0	0	7
Tulsa	0	28	7	7	42

at Skelly Field at H. A. Chapman Stadium • Tulsa, OK

- Date: August 31
- Game time: 7:00 p.m. CDT
- Game weather: • Temperature:
- TV announcers (ESPN+): James Westling (play-by-play) and Leger Douzable (analyst)
- ESPN game summary

Game information

First quarter
Second quarter
Third quarter
Fourth quarter

Statistics	UAPB	TLSA
First downs	18	26
Plays–yards	–252	–517
Rushes–yards	43–102	49–260
Passing yards	150	256
Passing: comp–att–int	15–26–1	16–20–2
Time of possession	33:05	26:55

Team	Category	Player	Statistics
Arkansas–Pine Bluff	Passing	Mekhi Hagens	10–21, 1908, 1 INT
Arkansas–Pine Bluff	Rushing	Johness Davis	17 carries, 82 yards
Arkansas–Pine Bluff	Receiving	Kenji Lewis	5 receptions, 64 yards
Tulsa	Passing	Cardell Williams	13–14, 233 yards, 3 TD
Tulsa	Rushing	Jordan Ford	19 carries, 110 yards, 1 TD
Tulsa	Receiving	Marquis Shoulders	5 receptions, 132 yards, 2 TD

=== at No. 8 Washington ===
Uniform combination
Helmet	Jersey	Pants

Tulsa (1–0, 0–0) at No. 8 Washington (1–0, 0–0)

Quarter	1	2	3	4	Total
Tulsa	3	0	0	7	10
No. 8 Washington	14	8	14	7	43

at Husky Stadium • Seattle, WA

- Date: September 9, 2023
- Game time: 4:00 p.m. CDT
- Game weather: Sunny • Temperature: 73 °F (23 °C)
- Referee: Jeff Dahle
- TV announcers (Pac-12 Network): J. B. Long (play-by-play) and Yogi Roth (analyst)

Game information

First quarter

- (12:19) WASH – Rome Odunze 2-yard pass from Michael Penix Jr., Grady Gross Kick (Drive: 6 plays, 65 yards, 2:41; WASH 7–0)
- (08:48) TUL – Chase Meyer 44 Yd Field Goal (Drive: 11 plays, 49 yards, 3:31; WASH 7–3)
- (02:46) WASH – Ja'Lynn Polk 27-yard rush, Grady Gross Kick (Drive: 9 plays, 87 yards, 5:52; WASH 14–3)

Second quarter

- (03:55) WASH – Jalen McMillan 9-yard pass from Michael Penix Jr., Jaden Green Pass to Dylan Morris for Two-Point Conversion (Drive: 9 plays, 80 yards, 4:42; WASH 22–3)

Third quarter

- (08:00) WASH – Germie Bernard 7-yard pass from Michael Penix Jr., Grady Gross Kick (Drive: 7 plays, 82 yards, 3:39; WASH 29–3)
- (00:40) WASH – Rome Odunze 14-yard rush, Grady Gross Kick (Drive: 6 plays, 71 yards, 3:35; WASH 36–3)

Fourth quarter

- (11:12) TUL – Luke McGary 15-yard pass from Roman Fuller, Chase Meyer Kick (Drive: 10 plays, 83 yards, 4:23; WASH 36–10)
- (03:00) WASH – Daniyel Ngata 1-yard rush, Grady Gross Kick (Drive: 8 plays, 62 yards, 3:51; WASH 43–10)

Statistics	TLSA	WASH
First downs	22	30
Plays–yards	–318	–563
Rushes–yards	40–168	22–109
Passing yards	150	454
Passing: comp–att–int	18–32–1	30–40–1
Time of possession	30:04	29:56

Team	Category	Player	Statistics
Tulsa	Passing	Roman Fuller	12–18, 85 yards, 1 TD
Tulsa	Rushing	Jordan Ford	15 carries, 67 yards
Tulsa	Receiving	Braylin Presley	3 receptions, 54 yards
Washington	Passing	Michael Penix Jr.	28–38, 409 yards, 3 TD, 1 INT
Washington	Rushing	Will Nixon	6 carries, 30 yards
Washington	Receiving	Jalen McMillan	8 receptions, 120 yards, 1 TD

=== No. 19 Oklahoma ===
Uniform combination
Helmet	Jersey	Pants

No. 19 Oklahoma (2–0, 0–0) at Tulsa (1–1, 0–0)

Quarter	1	2	3	4	Total
No. 19 Oklahoma	28	10	21	7	66
Tulsa	0	14	3	0	17

at Skelly Field at H. A. Chapman Stadium • Tulsa, OK

- Date: September 16, 2023
- Game time: 2:30 p.m. CDT
- Game weather: • Cloudy Temperature: 79
- Game attendance: 30,855
- Referee: Tutashinda Salaam
- TV announcers (ESPN2): Dave Flemming (play-by-play), Brock Osweiler (analyst), and Kayla Burton (sideline)

Game information

First Quarter

- (12:31) OKLA – Jalil Farooq 34 yard pass from Dillon Gabriel, Zach Schmit kick (Drive: 2 plays, 84 yards, 0:42; OKLA 7–0)
- (4:49) OKLA – Drake Stoops 4 yard pass from Dillon Gabriel, Zach Schmit kick (Drive: 11 plays, 92 yards, 4:14; OKLA 14–0)
- (3:34) OKLA – Danny Stutsman 30 yard interception return, Zach Schmit kick (Drive: 3 plays, 6 yards, 1:15; OKLA 21–0)
- (1:25) OKLA – Drake Stoops 4 yard pass from Dillon Gabriel, Zach Schmit kick (Drive: 4 plays, 37 yards, 1:19; OKLA 28–0)

Second Quarter

- (12:30) TUL – Marquis Shoulders 19 yard pass from Cardell Williams, Chase Meyer kick (Drive: 11 plays, 75 yards, 3:55; OKLA 28–7)
- (9:32) OKLA – Nic Anderson 28 yard pass from Dillon Gabriel, Zach Schmit kick (Drive: 8 plays, 78 yards, 2:52; OKLA 35–7)
- (5:30) TUL – Devan Williams 18 yard pass from Cardell Williams, Chase Meyer kick (Drive: 10 plays, 82 yards, 3:58; OKLA 35–14)
- (0:00) OKLA – Zach Schmit 20 yard field goal (Drive: 11 plays, 73 yards, 3:30; OKLA 38–14)

Third Quarter

- (9:54) TUL – Chase Meyer 21 yard field goal (Drive: 11 plays, 73 yards, 5:06; OKLA 38–17)
- (7:08) OKLA – Nic Anderson 42 yard pass from Dillion Gabriel, Zach Schmit kick (Drive: 6 plays, 73 yards, 2:38; OKLA 45–17)
- (3:23) OKLA – Jovantae Barnes 1 yard rush, Zach Schmit kick (Drive: 7 plays, 42 yards, 2:06; OKLA 52–17)
- (2:07) OKLA – Nic Anderson 50 yard pass from Jackson Arnold, Zach Schmit kick (Drive: 1 plays, 50 yards, 0:08; OKLA 59–17)

Fourth Quarter

- (14:09) OKLA – Gavin Sawchuk 1 yard rush, Zach Schmit kick (Drive: 2 plays, 4 yards, 0:43; OKLA 66–17)

Statistics	OKLA	TLSA
First downs	27	17
Plays–yards	63–595	73–292
Rushes–yards	28–119	46–75
Passing yards	476	217
Passing: comp–att–int	30–35–1	17–27–5
Time of possession	26:54	33:06

Team	Category	Player	Statistics
Oklahoma	Passing	Dillon Gabriel	28/31, 421 yards, 5 TD's, 1 INT
Oklahoma	Rushing	Jovantae Barnes	13 carries, 68 yards, 1 TD
Oklahoma	Receiving	Drake Stoops	8 receptions, 53 yards, 2 TD's
Tulsa	Passing	Cardell Williams	11/17, 196 yards, 2 TD's, 2 INT's
Tulsa	Rushing	Bill Jackson	10 carries, 40 yards
Tulsa	Receiving	Devan Williams	6 receptions, 71 yards, 1 TD

=== at Northern Illinois ===
Uniform combination
Helmet	Jersey	Pants

Tulsa (1–2, 0–0) at Northern Illinois (1–2, 0–0)

Quarter	1	2	3	4	Total
Tulsa	2	7	3	10	22
Northern Illinois	0	7	7	0	14

at Huskie Stadium • DeKalb, IL

- Date: September 23, 2023
- Game time: 11:00 a.m. CDT
- Game weather: • Temperature:
- TV: CBSSN
- ESPN game summary

Game information

First quarter
Second quarter
Third quarter
Fourth quarter

Statistics	TLSA	NIU
First downs	17	18
Plays–yards	–281	–295
Rushes–yards	48–179	41–167
Passing yards	102	128
Passing: comp–att–int	8–20–2	17–29–2
Time of possession	27:48	32:12

Team	Category	Player	Statistics
Tulsa	Passing	Cardell Williams	8–20, 102 yards, 2 INT
Tulsa	Rushing	Anthony Watkins	23 carries, 91 yards, 1 TD
Tulsa	Receiving	Kamdyn Benjamin	4 receptions, 53 yards
Northern Illinois	Passing	Ethan Hampton	13–23, 97 yards, 1 TD, 2 INT
Northern Illinois	Rushing	Justin Lynch	8 carries, 84 yards, 1 TD
Northern Illinois	Receiving	Grayson Barnes	3 receptions, 40 yards

=== Temple ===
Uniform combination
Helmet	Jersey	Pants

Temple (2–2, 0–0) at Tulsa (2–2, 0–0)

Quarter	1	2	3	4	Total
Temple	3	0	15	8	26
Tulsa	14	7	10	17	48

at Skelly Field at H. A. Chapman Stadium • Tulsa, OK

- Date: September 28, 2023
- Game time: 6:30 p.m. CDT
- Game weather: • Temperature:
- Game attendance: 17,538
- TV: ESPN
- ESPN game summary

Game information

First quarter
Second quarter
Third quarter
Fourth quarter

Statistics	TEMP	TLSA
First downs	15	24
Plays–yards	–313	–533
Rushes–yards	21–44	53–289
Passing yards	269	244
Passing: comp–att–int	27–49–1	14–17–0
Time of possession	24:45	35:15

Team	Category	Player	Statistics
Temple	Passing	E. J. Warner	27–49, 269 yards, 2 TD, 1 INT
Temple	Rushing	Joquez Smith	10 carries, 26 yards
Temple	Receiving	Amad Anderson Jr.	4 receptions, 75 yards, 1 TD
Tulsa	Passing	Cardell Williams	14–17, 244 yards, 3 TD
Tulsa	Rushing	Cardell Williams	10 carries, 90 yards, 1 TD
Tulsa	Receiving	Marquis Shoulders	5 receptions, 76 yards, 2 TD

=== at Florida Atlantic ===
Uniform combination
Helmet	Jersey	Pants

Tulsa (3–2, 1–0) at Florida Atlantic (1–3, 0–0)

Quarter	1	2	3	4	Total
Tulsa	0	7	3	7	17
Florida Atlantic	14	3	0	3	20

at FAU Stadium • Boca Raton, FL

- Date: October 7, 2023
- Game time: 6:00 p.m. EDT
- Game weather: Sunny • Temperature: 83 °F (28 °C) • Wind: SE at 8 miles per hour (13 km/h)
- Game attendance: 21,077
- Referee: Nate Black
- TV announcers (ESPN+): Matt Schumacker (play-by-play), Taylor McHargue (analyst)

Game information

First quarter

- (8:02) FAU – Larry McCammon 1 yard run, Logan Lupo kick (Drive: 10 plays, 85 yards, 3:52; Florida Atlantic 7–0)
- (3:11) FAU – Larry McCammon 10 yard run, Logan Lupo kick (Drive: 6 plays, 41 yards, 2:04; Florida Atlantic 14–0)

Second quarter

- (9:07) TLSA – Cardell Williams 7 yard run, Chase Meyer kick (Drive: 12 plays, 90 yards, 4:30; Florida Atlantic 14–7)
- (0:58) FAU – Logan Lupo 21 yard field goal (Drive: 6 plays, 26 yards, 2:37; Florida Atlantic 17–7)

Third quarter

- (7:09) TLSA – Chase Meyer 36 yard field goal (Drive: 9 plays, 45 yards, 4:29; Florida Atlantic 17–10)

Fourth quarter

- (12:44) FAU – Logan Lupo 27 yard field goal (Drive: 8 plays, 83 yards, 4:08; Florida Atlantic 20–10)
- (5:01) TLSA – Luke McGary 20 yard pass from Braylon Braxton, Chase Meyer kick (Drive: 7 plays, 80 yards, 2:55; Florida Atlantic 20–17)

Statistics	TLSA	FAU
First downs	16	18
Plays–yards	71–376	71–378
Rushes–yards	43–194	43–234
Passing yards	182	144
Passing: comp–att–int	13–28–2	18–28–1
Time of possession	28:39	31:21

Team	Category	Player	Statistics
Tulsa	Passing	Cardell Williams	10/20, 115 yards, 2 INT
Tulsa	Rushing	Tahj Gary	11 carries, 53 yards
Tulsa	Receiving	Kamdyn Benjamin	3 receptions, 46 yards
Florida Atlantic	Passing	Daniel Richardson	18/28, 144 yards, 1 INT
Florida Atlantic	Rushing	Larry McCammon	26 carries, 130 yards, 2 TD
Florida Atlantic	Receiving	LaJohntay Wester	9 receptions, 98 yards

=== Rice ===
Uniform combination
Helmet	Jersey	Pants

Rice (3–3, 1–1) at Tulsa (3–3, 1–1)

Quarter	1	2	3	4	Total
Rice	14	7	14	7	42
Tulsa	0	10	0	0	10

at Skelly Field at H. A. Chapman Stadium • Tulsa, OK

- Date: October 19, 2023
- Game time: 6:00 p.m. CDT
- Game weather: Clear • Temperature: 82 °F (28 °C)
- Game attendance: 18,527
- Referee: Darryl DeBerry
- TV announcers (ESPN2): Jay Alter, Rene Ingoglia, and Lericia Harris

Game information

First quarter

- (12:37) RICE – Dean Connors 54-yard run (Tim Horn kick). Owls 7–0. Drive: 2 plays, 70 yards, 0:46.
- (2:42) RICE – Luke McCaffrey 21-yard pass from JT Daniels (Tim Horn kick). Owls 14–0. Drive: 2 plays, 53 yards, 0:55.

Second quarter

- (5:45) TLSA – Chase Meyer 45-yard field goal. Owls 14–3. Drive: 5 plays, 21 yards, 1:52.
- (1:14) TLSA – Kamdyn Benjamin 30-yard pass from Cardell Williams (Chase Meyer kick). Owls 14–10. Drive: 4 plays, 69 yards, 1:20.
- (0:33) RICE – Landon Ransom-Goelz 17-yard pass from JT Daniels (Tim Horn kick). Owls 21–10. Drive: 6 plays, 74 yards, 0:36.

Third quarter

- (9:47) RICE – JT Daniels 8-yard run (Tim Horn kick). Owls 28–10. Drive: 6 plays, 75 yards, 3:28.
- (0:23) RICE – Dean Connors 2-yard run (Tim Horn kick). Owls 35–10. Drive: 13 plays, 91 yards, 8:05.

Fourth quarter

- (2:58) RICE – Dean Connors 10-yard run (Tim Horn kick). Owls 42–10. Drive: 14 plays, 96 yards, 9:56.

Statistics	RICE	TLSA
First downs	24	14
Plays–yards	68–512	64–296
Rushes–yards	31–170	42–158
Passing yards	342	138
Passing: comp–att–int	24–37–0	11–22–1
Time of possession	33:48	26:12

Team	Category	Player	Statistics
Rice	Passing	JT Daniels	24–37, 342 yards, 2 TD
Rice	Rushing	Dean Connors	9 carries, 120 yards, 3 TD
Rice	Receiving	Luke McCaffrey	6 receptions, 99 yards, 1 TD
Tulsa	Passing	Cardell Williams	7–14, 101 yards, 1 TD
Tulsa	Rushing	Braylon Braxton	12 carries, 89 yards
Tulsa	Receiving	Kamdyn Benjamin	3 receptions, 48 yards, 1 TD

=== at SMU ===
Uniform combination
Helmet	Jersey	Pants

Tulsa (3–4, 1–2) at SMU (5–2, 0–0)

Quarter	1	2	3	4	Total
Tulsa	3	0	0	7	10
SMU	28	24	14	3	69

at Gerald J. Ford Stadium • University Park, TX

- Date: Saturday, October 28, 2023
- Game time: 11:00 a.m. CDT
- Game weather: Rain • Temperature: 60 °F (16 °C)
- Game attendance: 20,800
- Referee: Kevin Randall
- TV announcers (ESPNU): John Schriffen, Rocky Boiman, and Dawn Davenport

Game information

First quarter

- SMU – Romello Brinson 74-yard pass from Preston Stone (Collin Rogers kick), 14:10. Mustangs 7–0. Drive: 2 plays, 75 yards, 0:45.
- SMU – Tyler Lavine 1-yard run (Collin Rogers kick), 9:34. Mustangs 14–0. Drive: 6 plays, 41 yards, 1:51.
- TLSA – Chase Meyer 35-yard field goal, 4:44. Mustangs 14–3. Drive: 11 plays, 58 yards, 4:50.
- SMU – Jaylan Knighton 11-yard run (Collin Rogers kick), 1:46. Mustangs 21–3. Drive: 8 plays, 72 yards, 2:52.
- SMU – Isaiah Nwokobia 25-yard interception return (Collin Rogers kick), 0:26. Mustangs 28–3.

Second quarter

- SMU – Collin Rogers 42-yard field goal, 12:07. Mustangs 31–3. Drive: 7 plays, 56 yards, 1:30.
- SMU – RJ Maryland 62-yard pass from Preston Stone (Collin Rogers kick), 11:35. Mustangs 38–3. Drive: 1 play, 62 yards, 0:10.
- SMU – Camar Wheaton 4-yard run (Collin Rogers kick), 7:34. Mustangs 45–3. Drive: 7 plays, 80 yards, 2:07.
- SMU – Moochie Dixon 17-yard pass from Preston Stone (Collin Rogers kick), 4:37. Mustangs 52–3. Drive: 6 plays, 58 yards, 1:41.

Third quarter

- SMU – Velton Gardner 1-yard run (Collin Rogers kick), 8:21. Mustangs 59–3. Drive: 12 plays, 70 yards, 5:49.
- SMU – Camar Wheaton 48-yard field goal, 3:50. Mustangs 66–3. Drive: 4 plays, 66 yards, 2:03.

Fourth quarter

- TLSA – Kamdyn Benjamin 5-yard pass from Cardell Williams (Chase Meyer kick), 9:59. Mustangs 66–10. Drive: 12 plays, 68 yards, 4:52.
- SMU – Collin Rogers 22-yard field goal, 2:24. Mustangs 69–10. Drive: 8 plays, 54 yards, 5:07.

Statistics	TLSA	SMU
First downs	14	26
Plays–yards	–247	–638
Rushes–yards	47–123	39–192
Passing yards	124	446
Passing: comp–att–int	14–25–2	22–29–0
Time of possession	30:13	29:47

Team	Category	Player	Statistics
Tulsa	Passing	Braylon Braxton	10–20, 92 yards, 2 INT
Tulsa	Rushing	Anthony Watkins	15 carries, 50 yards
Tulsa	Receiving	Devan Williams	3 receptions, 57 yards
SMU	Passing	Preston Stone	15–20, 371 yards, 3 TD
SMU	Rushing	Camar Wheaton	9 receptions, 80 yards, 2 TD
SMU	Receiving	RJ Maryland	2 receptions, 95 yards, 1 TD

=== Charlotte ===
Uniform combination
Helmet	Jersey	Pants

Charlotte (2–6, 0–0) at Tulsa (3–5, 1–3)

Quarter	1	2	3	4	OT	Total
Charlotte	0	10	5	11	7	33
Tulsa	14	3	0	9	0	26

at Skelly Field at H. A. Chapman Stadium • Tulsa, OK

- Date: Saturday, November 4, 2023
- Game time: 3:00 p.m. CDT
- Game weather: Cloudy • Temperature: 73 °F (23 °C) • Wind: 7 N MPH
- Game attendance: 20,151
- Referee: Steven Anderson
- TV announcers (ESPN+): Matt Schumacher, LaDarrin McClane

Game information

First quarter
Second quarter
Third quarter
Fourth quarter

Statistics	CLT	TLSA
First downs	19	21
Plays–yards	–431	–412
Rushes–yards	36–154	50–273
Passing yards	277	139
Passing: comp–att–int	20–37–0	13–31–1
Time of possession	30:12	29:48

Team	Category	Player	Statistics
Charlotte	Passing	Trexler Ivey	20–36, 277 yards, 1 TD
Charlotte	Rushing	Henry Rutledge	4 carries, 92 yards
Charlotte	Receiving	Jairus Mack	7 receptions, 124 yards
Tulsa	Passing	Kirk Francis	6–16, 74 yards, 1 INT
Tulsa	Rushing	Anthony Watkins	24 carries, 146 yards, 1 TD
Tulsa	Receiving	Kamdyn Benjamin	5 receptions, 46 yards

=== at No. 23 Tulane ===
Uniform combination
Helmet	Jersey	Pants

Tulsa (3–6, 1–4) at No. 23 Tulane (8–1, 5–0)

Quarter	1	2	3	4	Total
Tulsa	0	10	3	9	22
No. 23 Tulane	14	0	7	3	24

at Yulman Stadium • New Orleans, LA

- Date: Saturday, November 11, 2023
- Game time: 11:00 a.m. CDT
- Game weather: Cloudy • Temperature: 67 °F (19 °C) • Wind: NE 8 mph
- Game attendance: 20,126
- Referee: Scott Hardin
- TV announcers (ESPN2): Roy Philpott (play-by-play), Roddy White (color), Taylor McGregor (sideline)

Game information

First quarter

- (7:14) TUL – Makhi Hughes 1-yard run, Valentino Ambrosio kick (Drive: 12 plays, 70 yards, 5:53; Tulane 7–0)
- (0:00) TUL – Alex Bauman 39-yard pass from Michael Pratt, Valentino Ambrosio kick (Drive: 5 plays, 82 yards, 2:04; Tulane 14–0)

Second quarter

- (13:31) TLSA – Kamdyn Benjamin 8-yard pass from Kirk Francis, Chase Meyer kick (Drive: 5 plays, 75 yards, 1:29; Tulane 14–7)
- (7:23) TLSA – Chase Meyer 37-yard field goal (Drive: 10 plays, 65 yards, 3:18; Tulane 14–10)

Third quarter

- (14:47) TUL – Shedro Louis 100-yard kickoff return, Valentino Ambrosio kick (Drive: Tulane 21–10)
- (5:50) TLSA – Chase Meyer 30-yard field goal (Drive: 8 plays, 69 yards, 3:18; Tulane 21–13)

Fourth quarter

- (13:58) TLSA – Chase Meyer 47-yard field goal (Drive: 11 plays, 48 yards, 3:57; Tulane 21–16)
- (9:21) TUL – Valentino Ambrosio 30-yard field goal (Drive: 9 plays, 60 yards, 4:29; Tulane 24–16)
- (3:03) TLSA – Kamdyn Benjamin 4-yard pass from Braylon Braxton (Drive: 4 plays, 67 yards, 1:40; Tulane 24–22)

Statistics	TLSA	TULN
First downs	22	17
Plays–yards	74–477	64–357
Rushes–yards	33–122	35–163
Passing yards	355	194
Passing: comp–att–int	26–41–1	16–29–1
Time of possession	29:29	30:31

Team	Category	Player	Statistics
Tulsa	Passing	Kirk Francis	22/34, 345 yards, TD
Tulsa	Rushing	Anthony Watkins	15 carries, 76 yards
Tulsa	Receiving	Kamdyn Benjamin	8 receptions, 157 yards, 2 TD
Tulane	Passing	Michael Pratt	16/29, 194 yards, TD, INT
Tulane	Rushing	Makhi Hughes	19 carries, 131 yards, TD
Tulane	Receiving	Bryce Bohanon	4 receptions, 57 yards

=== North Texas ===
Uniform combination
Helmet	Jersey	Pants

North Texas (3–7, 1–5) at Tulsa (3–7, 1–5)

Quarter	1	2	3	4	Total
North Texas	7	14	14	0	35
Tulsa	7	14	0	7	28

at Skelly Field at H. A. Chapman Stadium • Tulsa, OK

- Date: Saturday, November 18, 2023
- Game time: 2:00 p.m. CDT
- Game weather: • Temperature:
- Game attendance: 16,520
- TV: ESPN+

Game information

First quarter
Second quarter
Third quarter
Fourth quarter

Statistics	UNT	TLSA
First downs	22	22
Plays–yards	78–593	77–434
Rushes–yards	47–299	43–183
Passing yards	294	251
Passing: comp–att–int	19–31–0	17–34–1
Time of possession	32:04	27:56

Team	Category	Player	Statistics
North Texas	Passing	Chandler Rogers	19–31, 294 yards, 3 TD
North Texas	Rushing	Oscar Adaway III	16 carries, 126 yards, 1 TD
North Texas	Receiving	Ja'Mori Maclin	2 receptions, 61 yards
Tulsa	Passing	Kirk Francis	17–34, 251 yards, 3 TD, 1 INT
Tulsa	Rushing	Anthony Watkins	21 carries, 115 yards, 1 TD
Tulsa	Receiving	Kamdyn Benjamin	8 receptions, 93 yards, 1 TD

=== at East Carolina ===
Uniform combination
Helmet	Jersey	Pants

Tulsa (3–8, 1–6) at East Carolina (2–9, 0–0)

Quarter	1	2	3	4	Total
Tulsa	13	7	6	3	29
East Carolina	14	10	0	3	27

at Dowdy-Ficklen Stadium • Greenville, NC

- Date: Saturday, November 25, 2023
- Game time: 1:00 p.m. CDT
- Game weather: • Temperature:
- Game attendance: 29,567
- TV: ESPN+

Game information

First quarter
Second quarter
Third quarter
Fourth quarter

Statistics	TLSA	ECU
First downs	23	17
Plays–yards	–446	–409
Rushes–yards	33–149	37–225
Passing yards	297	184
Passing: comp–att–int	23–37–1	12–18–2
Time of possession	30:50	29:10

Team	Category	Player	Statistics
Tulsa	Passing	Kirk Francis	23–37, 297 yards, 2 TD, 1 INT
Tulsa	Rushing	Anthony Watkins	18 carries, 106 yards
Tulsa	Receiving	Kamdyn Benjamin	6 receptions, 143 yards, 1 TD
East Carolina	Passing	Alex Flinn	12–18, 184 yards, 2 TD, 2 INT
East Carolina	Rushing	Rahjai Harris	21 carries, 145 yards, 1 TD
East Carolina	Receiving	Chase Sowell	5 receptions, 108 yards

== Personnel ==
=== Roster ===
2023 Tulsa Golden Hurricane football team roster
Players
Coaches
Offense

Pos.	#	Name	Class
QB	1	Braylon Braxton	RSo
WR	2	Nick Rempert	RSr
RB	3	Bill Jackson	RSo
WR	4	Marquis Shoulders	RSo
RB	5	Braylin Presley	So
RB	6	Jordan Ford	RSr
QB	7	Cardell Williams	RFr
RB	8	Tahj Gary	RJr
QB	9	Stephen Kittleman	RSo
QB	10	Roman Fuller	RJr
QB	11	Kirk Francis	Fr
QB	12	Nate Ratcliff	RFr
WR	12	Keith Wheeler II	RFr
WR	13	Malachai Jones	RJr
QB	15	Will Pickard	RFr
WR	15	Carl Chester	Jr
QB	16	Jackson Johnson	Fr
WR	18	Kamdyn Benjamin	RSr
WR	19	Devan Williams	RFr
WR	20	Grayson Tempest	Fr
WR	21	Cam Crooks	Fr
WR	22	Scottie Alexander	RSo
RB	23	Anthony Watkins	RSr
WR	24	Matthew Ogunrin	Fr
WR	26	Eli Potts	RFr
RB	28	Jayce Morgan	RFr
RB	32	Keigan Powers	Fr
TE	34	Waylon Adams	RSo
WR	35	Mari Smith	Fr
TE	41	Camden Peck	Fr
TE	47	Ethan Hall	RSr
TE	48	Daegen Jensen	Fr
OL	50	Gabe Cantu	RJr
OL	51	Tautai Lio Marks	RJr
OL	52	Kasen Carpenter	Fr
OL	54	Walter Young Bear	RSo
OL	56	Will Farniok	RSr
OL	57	Kai-Leon Herbert	GS
OL	61	Bennett Ringleb	Fr
OL	65	Rey Burnett	RJr
OL	66	Will Morris	Fr
OL	69	Brody Wisecarver	RSo
OL	71	Tanyon Zachary	RFr
OL	74	Jeremy Jones	RSr
OL	76	Chester Baah	RSr
OL	77	Bryce Bray	RSr
OL	78	Daniel Ademisoye	RFr
OL	79	Darrell Simpson	GS
TE	80	Colby Powers	RSo
TE	82	Connor Vaughn	RFr
WR	84	Ashton Schumann	Fr
WR	85	Cole Greene	Fr
WR	86	Jeshari Houston	RSo
TE	87	Luke McGary	Fr
TE	88	Bayne Tryon	RJr
WR	89	Jahrid Hughes	Fr

Defense

Pos.	#	Name	Class
S	1	Kendarin Ray	GS
S	2	Jehlen Cannady	RJr
CB	3	Reggie Ellis	RSr
CB	4	Tyree Carlisle	Sr
DB	5	Keuan Parker	RSo
DB	7	Xavier Lanier	GS
LB	8	Coleton Smith	GS
DB	9	Kanion Williams	GS
S	10	Sean O'Keefe	RJr
DB	11	Demarco Jones	GS
DB	12	Donte Burton	GS
CB	13	NuNu Campbell	RFr
CB	15	Kaylon Washington	RJr
DB	16	Devin Robinson	Fr
LB	20	Jaden Moore	RSo
DL	21	Ben Kopenski	GS
S	22	LJ Wallace	GS
CB	23	Canon Peters	RSo
LB	24	Julien Simon	RSo
S	25	Jaise Oliver	RSr
LB	26	Zach Neilsen	RFr
LB	27	Zane Woodham	Fr
LB	28	Seth Bullock	RSo
S	29	Georderrial Williams	RSo
DL	30	Izuchukwu King Ani	RJr
DL	32	Vontroy Malone	RFr
LB	33	William Alexander	RSo
LB	34	Elijah Wilson	Fr
DB	35	C.J. Turner	Fr
DB	37	Brant McNear	Fr
DB	38	Jair Murphy	Fr
S	39	Dayne Hodge	RSo
LB	40	Mitchell Kulkin	GS
LB	41	Dorian Hopkins	RSr
DB	42	C.J. Coombes	Fr
DB	43	Bryson Rouse	Fr
DL	44	Joseph Anderson	GS
LB	46	Bershard Glaspie Jr.	RSr
CB	47	Kyron Grayson	RFr
DL	48	Owen Ostroski	RSo
LB	49	Eli McWilliams	RFr
LB	50	Connor Strudwick	RFr
DL	52	Duvan Boshoff	RFr
LB	54	Cade Lopez	RSo
DL	57	Zaid Hamdan	GS
DL	58	Denver Hanna	RFr
DL	72	Tai Newhouse	RFr
DL	90	Jayden Simon	RJr
DL	92	Reeves Baller	Fr
DL	93	Luke Berry	Fr
DL	94	Justin Lohrenz	RSo
DL	95	R.J. Jackson	Fr
DL	96	James Eaglin III	Fr
DL	97	Brody Reese	RSo
DL	98	Tyler Rich	Fr
DL	99	Everitt Rogers	Sr

Special teams

Pos.	#	Name	Class
K	16	Connor Bryan	RSo
K	18	Michael Slaba	RFr
P	29	Angus Davies	Fr
P	32	Scott Stanford	RFr
LS	35	Connor Cook	RFr
LS	46	Caleb Matthews	RSo
LS	85	Austin Ortega	GS
K	90	Nate Long	RSr
K	91	Chase Meyer	So
K	95	Evan Guenthner	Fr

Head coach

- Kevin Wilson
  Head coach

Coordinators/assistant coaches

- Ron Burton
  Associate Head Coach & Defensive Line Coach
- Steve Spurrier Jr.
  Offensive coordinator & Quarterbacks Coach
- Chris Polizzi
  Defensive coordinator & Safeties Coach
- Joe Bolden
  Special Teams Coordinator & Defensive Assistant
- Greg Frey
  Tight Ends Coach
- Michael Hunter Jr.
  Defensive Passing Game Coordinator & Cornerbacks Coach
- Adrian Mayes
  Running Backs Coach
- Koy McFarland
  Defensive Run Game Coordinator & Linebackers Coach
- Ryan Stanchek
  Offensive Line Coach
- Ryan Switzer
  Wide Receivers Coach
- Cody Scribner
  Quality Control Analyst Defense
- Dominique Franks
  Quality Control Analyst Defense
- Lance Dunbar
  Quality Control Analyst Offense
- Mason Farquhar
  Defensive Graduate Assistant
- Byron Robinson Jr.
  Defensive Graduate Assistant
- Ravi Savitala
  Director of Football Operations
- Logan Armstrong
  Director of Football Recruiting
- Dan Bitson
  Director of Player Personnel Development
- Tom Ososkie
  Director of Scouting
- Brendan McNamara
  Director of Football Video Services
- Grant Spencer
  Director of Creative Media for Football

Legend

- (C) Team captain
- (S) Suspended
- (I) Ineligible
- Injured
- Redshirt

Roster
