= JT Daniels =

American football player (born 2000)

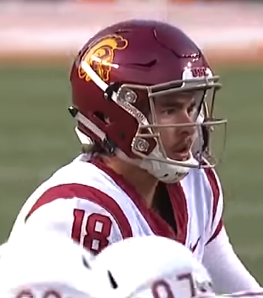
- Daniels with the USC Trojans in 2018

Biographical details
- Born: February 2, 2000 (age 26); Irvine, California, U.S.

Playing career
- 2018–2019: USC
- 2020–2021: Georgia
- 2022: West Virginia
- 2023: Rice
- Position: Quarterback

Coaching career (HC unless noted)
- 2024: West Georgia (off. analyst)

Jonathan Tyler Daniels (born February 2, 2000) is an American college football coach and former quarterback. He played college football for the USC Trojans, Georgia Bulldogs (where he won the CFP national championship as a backup to Stetson Bennett), West Virginia Mountaineers and Rice Owls.

After his graduation, he was an analyst for West Georgia in 2024.

== Early life ==
Daniels was born in Irvine, California, the son of Ali and Steve Daniels. His father is Catholic and his mother is Jewish. He attended Mater Dei High School in Santa Ana, California. During his high school career, he passed for 12,014 yards with 152 touchdowns and 14 interceptions.

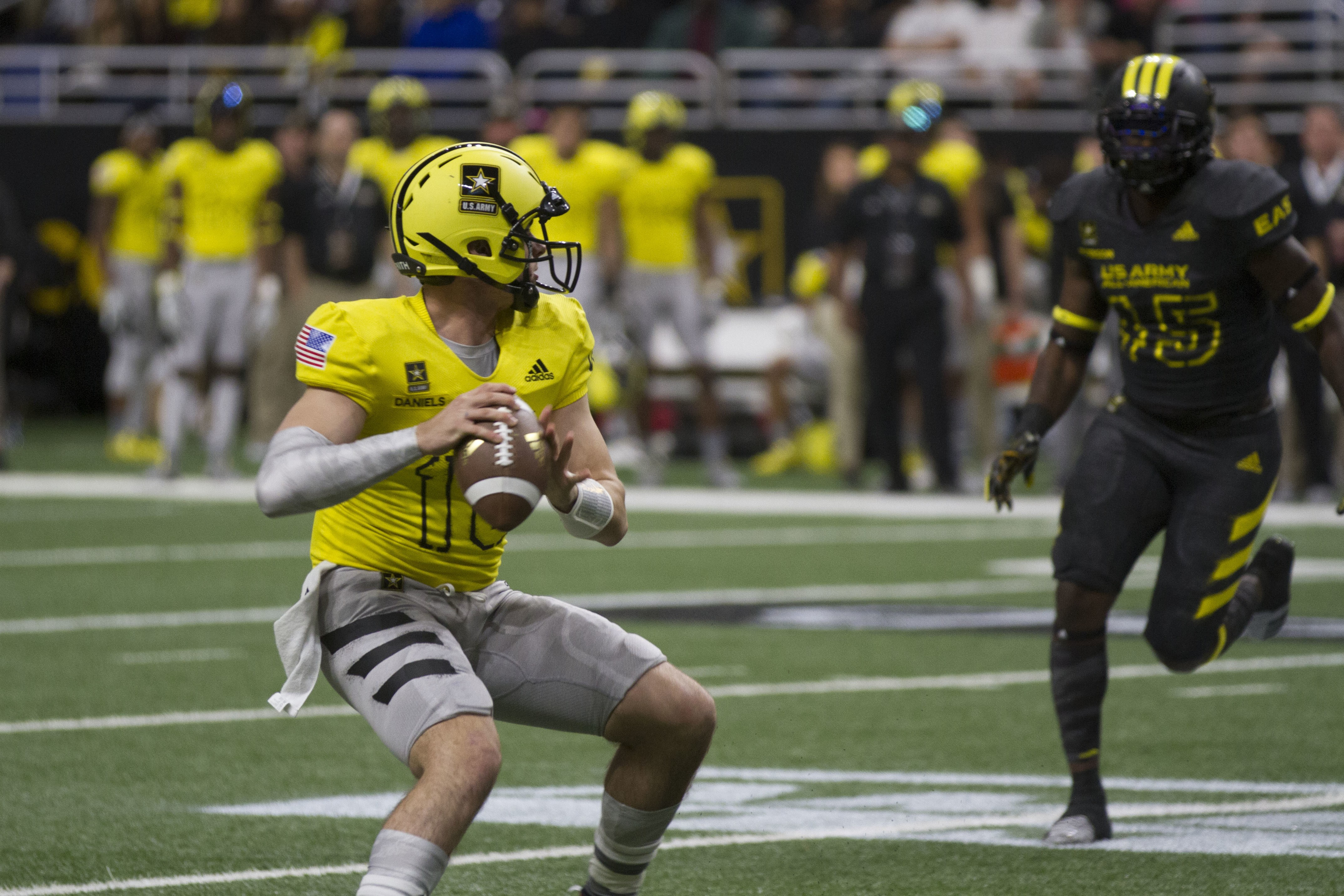
Daniels at the 2018 U.S. Army All-American Bowl

Daniels was notable for earning the starting position his freshman year and full play calling responsibility his sophomore year, the latter of which being a distinction that took fellow Mater Dei and USC alum Matt Barkley until his senior year to earn. He threw for 4,849 yards and 67 touchdowns his sophomore season. As a junior, he won the Gatorade Football Player of the Year and then later the Male Athlete of the Year award, after passing for 4,123 yards and scoring 61 total touchdowns (52 passing, nine rushing), leading his team to a 15–0 record and a consensus high school football national championship. Mater Dei held the #1 position from the first week of the season and did not trail at any point in the season, winning every game by at least 10 points in CIF's Division I.

== College career ==
=== USC ===
==== 2018 season ====
Daniels was a five-star recruit and ranked as the number one overall recruit in his class by Rivals.com prior to his reclassification. He committed to the University of Southern California (USC) to play college football. In December 2017, Daniels announced that he would graduate early from high school and reclassify to the 2018 class. He enrolled at USC in June 2018 upon completion of his high school course work. In August 2018, he began USC's two week fall camp in a three-way competition for the starting quarterback position. Within three weeks, Daniels was named the starter over incumbents Matt Fink and Jack Sears, making him the second true freshman in school history to start a season opener. In his true freshman year, Daniels passed for 2,672 yards, 14 touchdowns, and ten interceptions in 11 games, missing just one game due to concussion. The Trojans went 5–7 for the season.

==== 2019 season ====
In 2019, he won the starting job over Fink, Sears, and Kedon Slovis. During the season opener against the Fresno State Bulldogs, he tore his ACL during a sack in the second quarter; at the time of the injury, he had completed 25 of 34 passes for 215 yards, a touchdown, and an interception. Daniels was eventually ruled out for the remainder of the year and Slovis was named the starting quarterback.

Following the emergence of Slovis, USC head coach Clay Helton announced that Daniels entered his name in the NCAA transfer portal on April 16, 2020.

=== Georgia ===
==== 2020 season ====
On May 28, 2020, Daniels announced that he would be transferring to the University of Georgia. Daniels was granted immediate eligibility to play by the NCAA on July 13. Going into the 2020 season, Daniels competed with Jamie Newman, D'Wan Mathis, Stetson Bennett and Carson Beck for the starting job. On September 2, Newman announced he would opt-out of the 2020 season due to COVID-19 concerns and began to prepare for the 2021 NFL draft, leaving Daniels to compete with Mathis, Bennett and Beck. Ultimately, Mathis was named the starting quarterback for the season-opener against the Arkansas Razorbacks. Daniels was cleared to play by the team doctors, but not his personal doctor, so he said he would not play. Still, head coach Kirby Smart named Daniels the backup quarterback behind Bennett, who replaced Mathis due to poor play against Arkansas. Daniels was named the starting quarterback in the game against the Mississippi State Bulldogs, after Bennett sustained a shoulder injury against the Florida Gators.

On November 21, Daniels made his first start and appearance with Georgia against Mississippi State and went 28-of-38 for 401 passing yards with four touchdowns in the 31–24 win. Following that game, Daniels was named the starter for the remainder of the season. Daniels led the Bulldogs to the Peach Bowl, where he went 26-of-38 for 392 passing yards with one touchdown and one interception in the 24–21 win. The Bulldogs went 4–0 in Daniels' four starts and Daniels finished the season with 80 passing completions out of 119 attempts for 1,231 passing yards with 10 touchdowns and two interceptions.

==== 2021 season ====
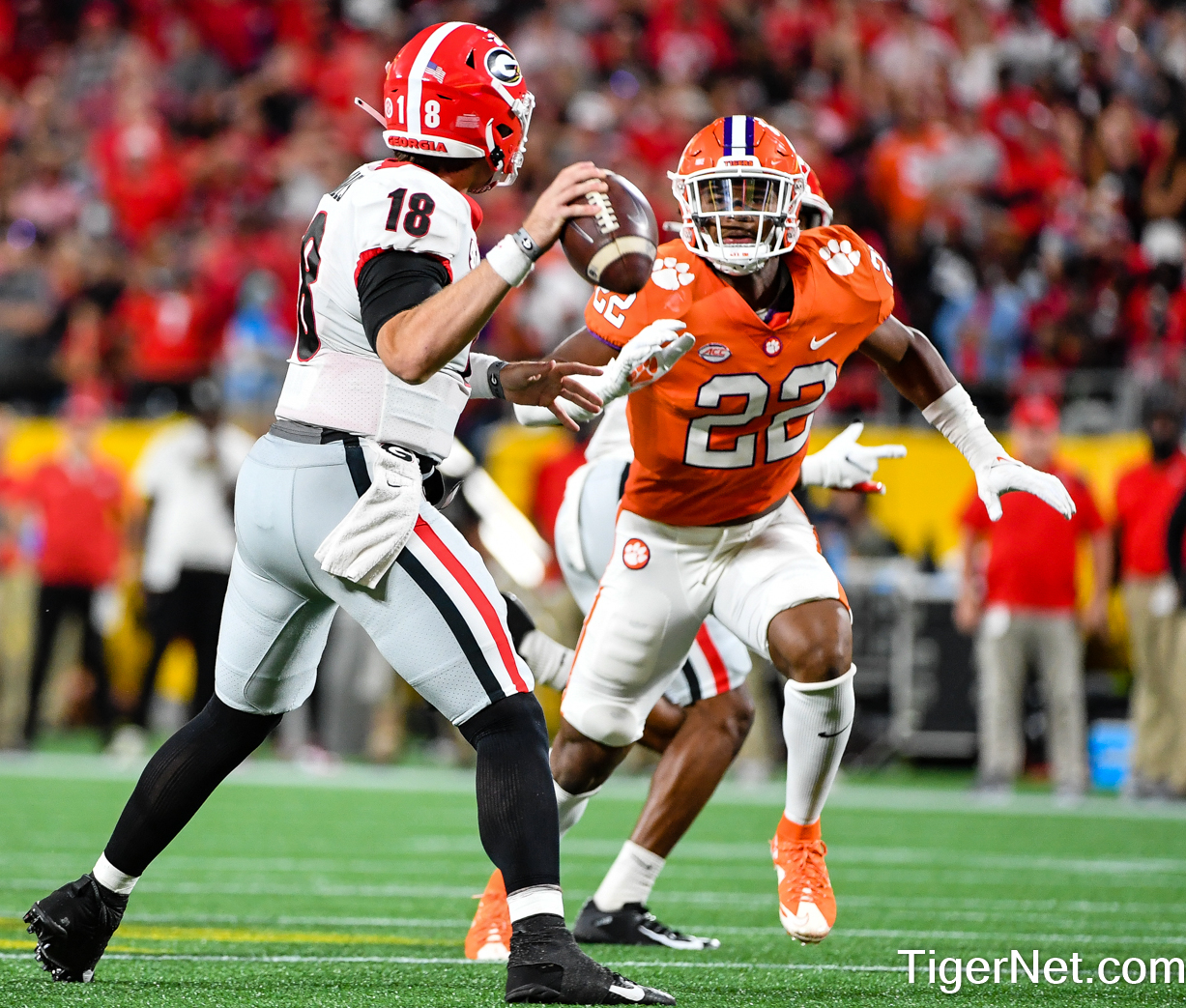
Daniels with the Georgia Bulldogs in 2021

Beginning the 2021 season, Daniels was the clear frontrunner for starting quarterback, with Stetson Bennett as backup. In the season opener against the Clemson Tigers, Daniels threw 22-for-30 with 135 yards, with no touchdowns and one interception in the 10–3 win. Following Georgia's victory, Daniels was sidelined with an oblique injury, leaving Bennett as the starter for an indefinite period. Daniels returned two weeks later against the South Carolina Gamecocks and threw 23-for-31 with 303 yards, and two touchdowns and one interception. Daniels started a week later on September 25 against the Vanderbilt Commodores and threw 9-for-10 with two touchdowns for 129 yards, but was replaced by Bennett. Daniels did not return until November 6 against the Missouri Tigers; however, he only appeared briefly in relief of a struggling Bennett, throwing 7-of-11 for 82 yards with a touchdown and an interception. Daniels' last appearance came against the Charleston Southern Buccaneers on November 20 during senior day (the last home game of the season), and threw 7-for-12, gaining 73 yards and a touchdown during his brief stint.

Despite a poor performance by Bennett in the SEC championship game against the Alabama Crimson Tide with two interceptions, head coach Kirby Smart remained confident in Bennett's abilities for the remainder of the season. Following Georgia's national championship and Bennett's affirmation to play out his final season of eligibility in 2022, Daniels entered the NCAA transfer portal.

=== West Virginia ===
On April 13, 2022, Daniels announced his intention to transfer to West Virginia University. He was benched midseason in favor of Garrett Greene. On December 5, Daniels entered the transfer portal.

=== Rice ===
On December 20, 2022, Daniels announced his intention to transfer to Rice University, his fourth program in his six-year collegiate career.

On September 10, 2023, Daniels led the Owls to a 43–41 victory in 2OT against the Houston Cougars in the Bayou Bucket Classic, throwing a career-high 401 yards and three touchdowns. On November 4, Daniels would end up playing his final college game in a 36–31 loss to the SMU Mustangs. In the second quarter, he was hit by linebacker Ahmad Walker, and even threw a touchdown pass two plays later, but after being assessed with concussion-like symptoms, he did not appear for the team in the second half.

=== Retirement ===
On December 1, 2023, Daniels medically retired from football, after sustaining multiple concussions during his career.

== College statistics ==
Year	Team	Games			Passing								Rushing			
Year	Team	GP	GS	Record	Cmp	Att	Pct	Yds	Avg	TD	Int	Rtg	Att	Yds	Avg	TD
2018	USC	11	11	5−6	216	363	59.5	2,672	7.4	14	10	128.6	45	−149	−3.3	0
2019	USC	1	1	1−0	25	34	73.5	215	6.3	1	1	130.5	3	−6	−2.0	0
2020	Georgia	4	4	4−0	80	119	67.2	1,231	10.3	10	2	178.5	10	−71	−7.1	0
2021	Georgia	6	3	3−0	68	94	72.3	722	7.7	7	3	155.1	4	−18	−4.5	0
2022	West Virginia	10	10	4−6	200	327	61.2	2,107	6.4	13	9	122.9	30	−51	−1.7	1
2023	Rice	9	9	4−5	181	287	63.1	2,443	8.5	21	7	153.8	25	−65	−2.6	1
Career		41	38	21−17	770	1,224	62.9	9,390	7.7	66	32	139.9	117	−360	−3.1	2

== Coaching career ==
On March 19, 2024, Daniels was hired as a graduate assistant at the University of West Georgia, where he joined the coaching staff of Joel Taylor. He was also reunited with Dane Stevens, who was on the coaching staff at the University of Southern California. By the start of the season, Daniels' position had been tweaked to an offensive analyst role, in particular, working with the quarterbacks. Daniels did not return to the staff in 2025.

== See also ==
- List of select Jewish football players
