= Cardell Williams =

American football player (born 2002)

No. 6 – Maryland Terrapins
- Position: Quarterback
- Class: (redshirt) Senior

Personal information
- Born: October 15, 2002 (age 24); New Orleans, Louisiana, U.S.
- Listed height: 6 ft 2 in (1.88 m)
- Listed weight: 181 lb (82 kg)

Career information
- High school: Westfield (Harris County, Texas)
- College: Tulsa (2022–2024); Sacramento State (2025); Maryland (2026–present)
- Stats at ESPN

Cardell Williams (born October 15, 2002) is an American college football quarterback for the Maryland Terrapins. He previously played for the Tulsa Golden Hurricane and Sacramento State Hornets.

== Early life ==
Williams was born in New Orleans, Louisiana, and attended Westfield High School in Texas, where he completed 442 of 474 passes for 7,803 yards and 89 touchdowns to 20 interceptions and rushed for 420 yards and 15 touchdowns. He committed to play college football at Tulsa.

== College career ==
=== Tulsa ===
In the 2023 season opener, Williams made his college debut and completed 13 of 14 pass attempts for 233 yards and three touchdown, while adding a three-yard rushing touchdown, in a 42–7 win over Arkansas–Pine Bluff after replacing starter Braylon Braxton. He was named the team's starting quarterback going into their week 2 matchup. In his first start, Williams completed six of 14 passes for 65 yards and an interception before leaving the game in the second quarter with an injury against Washington. He got his first win as a starter in week 4, as he struggled going eight for passing with 102 yards and two interceptions, but Tulsa would beat Northern Illinois 22–14.

=== Sacramento State ===
On December 23, 2024, Williams decided to transfer to Sacramento State.

On December 16, 2025, Williams announced that he would enter the transfer portal for the second time.

=== Maryland ===
On May 30, 2026, Williams announced that he would transfer to Maryland.

=== Statistics ===
Year	Team	Games			Passing								Rushing				
Year	Team	GP	GS	Record	Cmp	Att	Pct	Yds	Avg	TD	Int	Rtg	Att	Yds	Avg	TD	Lng
2022	Tulsa	Redshirt															
2023	Tulsa	9	4	2–2	79	132	59.8	1,149	8.7	10	7	147.4	57	198	3.5	5	50
2024	Tulsa	7	0	0–0	5	11	45.5	37	3.4	0	0	73.7	13	65	5.0	2	28
2025	Sacramento State	12	10	7–3	110	175	62.9	1,621	9.3	10	7	151.5	99	382	3.9	12	51
Career		28	14	9–5	194	318	61.0	2,807	8.8	20	14	147.1	169	649	3.8	19	51
