= Kobe Lewis =

American football player (born 2000)

Profile
- Position: Running back

Personal information
- Born: June 14, 2000 (age 26); Americus, Georgia, U.S.
- Listed height: 5 ft 9 in (1.75 m)
- Listed weight: 208 lb (94 kg)

Career information
- High school: Americus-Sumter (Americus, Georgia)
- College: Central Michigan (2018–2021); Purdue (2022); FAU (2023)
- NFL draft: 2024: undrafted

Career history
- Seattle Seahawks (2024)*
- * Offseason or practice squad member only

Kobe Lewis (born June 14, 2000) is an American professional football running back. He played college football at Central Michigan, Purdue, and FAU and was signed by the Seattle Seahawks as an undrafted free agent in 2024.

== College career ==
Lewis played college football at Central Michigan from 2018 to 2021, where he played in 32 games, rushing for 1,579 yards and 18 touchdowns. He then transferred to Purdue, where he played 13 games, rushing for 146 yards. Afterwards, he transferred to FAU, where he played in 11 games, rushing for 406 yards and 3 touchdowns.

== Professional career ==
Pre-draft measurables
Height	Weight	Arm length	Hand span	40-yard dash	10-yard split	20-yard split	20-yard shuttle	Three-cone drill	Vertical jump	Broad jump	Bench press
5 ft 9 1/8 in (1.76 m)	208 lb (94 kg)	29 5/8 in (0.75 m)	8 7/8 in (0.23 m)	4.56 s	1.58 s	2.84 s	4.20 s	7.15 s	35 in (0.89 m)	10 ft 2 in (3.10 m)	22 reps
All values from Pro Day

=== Seattle Seahawks ===
After going undrafted in the 2024 NFL draft, on May 3, 2024, Lewis signed a three-year, $2.835 million contract with the Seattle Seahawks. He was waived on August 27.
